= Tokyo derby (football) =

Local derby in Tokyo

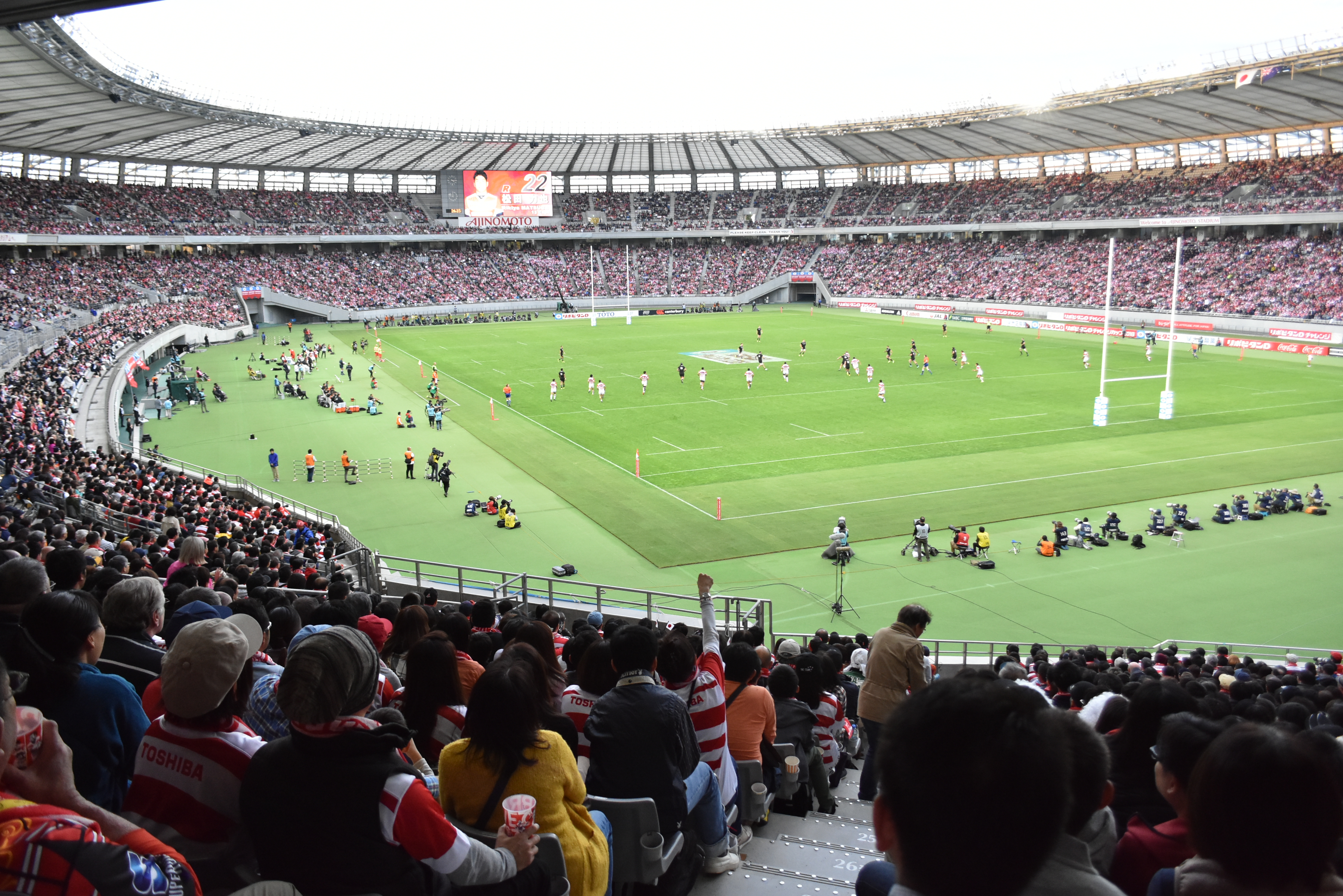
- Ajinomoto Stadium, the venue of the Tokyo derby
- Location: Tokyo
- Teams: FC Tokyo; Tokyo Verdy
- First meeting: 10 May 1970; Tokyo Metropolitan League; Yomiuri Club 3–5 Tokyo Gas
- Latest meeting: 17 October 2026; J1 League; Tokyo Verdy 0–4 FC Tokyo
- Next meeting: 9 May 2027; J1 League; FC Tokyo v Tokyo Verdy
- Stadiums: Ajinomoto Stadium

Statistics
- Total meetings: 30
- Most wins: FC Tokyo (15)
- Top scorer: Edmundo; Lucas (4 goals each)
- All-time series: FC Tokyo: 15; Drawn: 9 Tokyo Verdy: 6
- Largest victory: 25 May 2008; J.League Cup; FC Tokyo 3–0 Tokyo Verdy

The Tokyo derby (東京ダービー, Tōkyō dābī) is the local derby in Tokyo, Japan, between fierce capital city rivals FC Tokyo and Tokyo Verdy. The rivalry becomes more intense as both teams share their home ground, the Ajinomoto Stadium.

== History ==
Tokyo Gas FC was founded in 1935 by the employees of Tokyo Gas, and Yomiuri Club was founded in 1969 as a club team supported by Yomiuri Shimbun. Tokyo Gas and Yomiuri Club first met in the Tokyo Metropolitan League in 1970 with Tokyo Gas winning, but they didn't meet again until 2000 because Yomiuri Club was promoted to the Kanto Soccer League. Yomiuri Club moved to Kawasaki in 1992 and went professional as Verdy Kawasaki, and Tokyo Gas changed club name to FC Tokyo and became professional in 1999. FC Tokyo and Verdy Kawasaki first faced each other in the J.League in 2000, but Verdy Kawasaki moved to Tokyo and changed club name to Tokyo Verdy in the next year.

The Tokyo derby is known as one of the most controversial derby matches in Japan. Yomiuri Club applied to use National Stadium in Tokyo as their home stadium in preparation for the start of the professional league, and the stadium was also welcomed, but the J.League rejected the request, so Verdy Kawasaki had to use Todoroki Athletics Stadium as their home stadium. While J.League chairman Saburo Kawabuchi advocated a community-based approach, Yomiuri Shimbun president and Verdy Kawasaki owner Tsuneo Watanabe was in conflict with Kawabuchi over corporatism, calling the club Yomiuri Verdy and its official name Yomiuri Nippon Soccer Club. As a result, when Verdy Kawasaki moved to Tokyo Stadium in Chofu in 2001, FC Tokyo already had a large local following. On the 9 July 2005 derby, the FC Tokyo's ultras threw an ashtray at Tokyo Verdy 1969 supporters and injuring three. On the 8 June 2008 derby, the Tokyo Verdy's ultras assaulted three FC Tokyo supporters. On the 4 May 2011 derby, the FC Tokyo's ultras clashed with a security guard and injuring him. On the 12 July 2023 derby, the FC Tokyo's ultras set off pyrotechnics at the stadium and destroyed the Tokyo Verdy sign by hurling raw eggs at it.

== Honours ==
As of 13 April 2024

| Competition | FC Tokyo | Tokyo Verdy |
|---|---|---|
| JSL Division 1/J.League/J.League Division 1/J1 League | 0 | 7 |
| JSL Division 2/JFL (1992–1998)/J2 League | 2 | 2 |
| Emperor's Cup | 1 | 5 |
| JSL Cup / J.League Cup | 3 | 6 |
| Japanese Super Cup | 0 | 4 |
| Konica Cup | 0 | 1 |
| Japanese Regional Football League Competition | 1 | 0 |
| Asian Club Championship/AFC Champions League/ AFC Champions League Elite | 0 | 1 |
| J.League Cup / Copa Sudamericana Championship | 1 | 0 |
| Total | 8 | 26 |

== Statistics ==
As of 17 October 2026, competitive matches only

| Competition | Played | FC Tokyo wins | Draws | Tokyo Verdy wins | FC Tokyo goals | Tokyo Verdy goals |
|---|---|---|---|---|---|---|
| Tokyo Metropolitan League | 1 | 1 | 0 | 0 | 5 | 3 |
| J1 League | 19 | 8 | 5 | 6 | 27 | 24 |
| J1 100 Year Vision League | 2 | 1 | 1 | 0 | 2 | 1 |
| J2 League | 2 | 0 | 2 | 0 | 1 | 1 |
| Emperor's Cup | 1 | 0 | 1 | 0 | 1 | 1 |
| J.League Cup | 5 | 5 | 0 | 0 | 14 | 5 |
| Total | 30 | 15 | 9 | 6 | 50 | 35 |

== Matches ==
=== Tokyo Metropolitan League ===
| # | Date | Home scorers | Home | Result | Away | Away scorers | Report |
|---|---|---|---|---|---|---|---|
| 1 | 10 May 1970 | unknown | Yomiuri Club | 3–5 | Tokyo Gas | unknown | |

=== J1 League ===
| # | Date | Home scorers | Home | Result | Away | Away scorers | Report |
|---|---|---|---|---|---|---|---|
| 1 | 27 May 2000 | Hayashi, Kim (2) | Verdy Kawasaki | 3–0 | FC Tokyo | | Report |
| 2 | 11 November 2000 | Tuto (2) | FC Tokyo | 2–3 | Verdy Kawasaki | Hayashi, Mikami, Hiramoto | Report |
| 3 | 10 March 2001 | Lopes (2) | FC Tokyo | 2–1 (g.g.) | Tokyo Verdy 1969 | Miura | Report |
| 4 | 24 November 2001 | Nagai | Tokyo Verdy 1969 | 1–0 | FC Tokyo | | Report |
| 5 | 24 July 2002 | Edmundo (2) | Tokyo Verdy 1969 | 2–1 | FC Tokyo | Amaral | Report |
| 6 | 18 September 2002 | Amaral, Kelly | FC Tokyo | 2–1 | Tokyo Verdy 1969 | Edmundo | Report |
| 7 | 5 April 2003 | Ramon, Iio | Tokyo Verdy 1969 | 2–1 | FC Tokyo | Baba | Report |
| 8 | 22 November 2003 | Abe | FC Tokyo | 1–1 | Tokyo Verdy 1969 | Iio | Report |
| 9 | 3 April 2004 | Toda, Jean, Baba | FC Tokyo | 3–2 | Tokyo Verdy 1969 | Hirano, M'Boma | Report |
| 10 | 29 August 2004 | | Tokyo Verdy 1969 | 0–1 | FC Tokyo | Kajiyama | Report |
| 11 | 9 July 2005 | | FC Tokyo | 0–0 | Tokyo Verdy 1969 | | Report |
| 12 | 22 October 2005 | Morimoto | Tokyo Verdy 1969 | 1–2 | FC Tokyo | Kajiyama, Sasá Salcedo | Report |
| 13 | 12 April 2008 | Hulk | Tokyo Verdy | 1–2 | FC Tokyo | Hanyu, Shibasaki (o.g.) | Report |
| 14 | 23 August 2008 | Cabore | FC Tokyo | 1–2 | Tokyo Verdy | Oguro, Nasu | Report |
| 15 | 13 April 2024 | Miki, Someno | Tokyo Verdy | 2–2 | FC Tokyo | Endo (2) | Report |
| 16 | 17 August 2024 | | FC Tokyo | 0–0 | Tokyo Verdy | | Report |
| 17 | 2 April 2025 | Hayashi, Someno | Tokyo Verdy | 2–2 | FC Tokyo | Sato, Trevisan | Report |
| 18 | 15 September 2025 | Nagakura | FC Tokyo | 1–0 | Tokyo Verdy | | Report |
| 19 | 17 October 2026 | | Tokyo Verdy | 0–4 | FC Tokyo | Scholz, Marcelo Ryan, Nagakura, Gómez | Report |
| 20 | 9 May 2027 | | FC Tokyo | | Tokyo Verdy | | |

=== J1 100 Year Vision League ===
| # | Date | Home scorers | Home | Result | Away | Away scorers | Report |
|---|---|---|---|---|---|---|---|
| 1 | 22 March 2026 | | Tokyo Verdy | 0–0 (4–2 p) | FC Tokyo | | Report |
| 2 | 10 May 2026 | Muroya, Nagakura | FC Tokyo | 2–1 | Tokyo Verdy | Morita | Report |

=== J2 League ===
| # | Date | Home scorers | Home | Result | Away | Away scorers | Report |
|---|---|---|---|---|---|---|---|
| 1 | 4 May 2011 | | Tokyo Verdy | 0–0 | FC Tokyo | | Report |
| 2 | 30 October 2011 | Lucas | FC Tokyo | 1–1 | Tokyo Verdy | unknown (o.g.) | Report |

=== Emperor's Cup ===
| # | Date | Home scorers | Home | Result | Away | Away scorers | Report |
|---|---|---|---|---|---|---|---|
| 1 | 12 July 2023 | Tsukagawa | FC Tokyo | 1–1 (a.e.t.) (9–8 p) | Tokyo Verdy | Shirai | Report |

=== J.League Cup ===
| # | Date | Home scorers | Home | Result | Away | Away scorers | Report |
|---|---|---|---|---|---|---|---|
| 1 | 30 April 2002 | | Tokyo Verdy 1969 | 0–1 | FC Tokyo | Miyazawa | Report |
| 2 | 9 May 2002 | Amaral, Miyazawa | FC Tokyo | 2–1 | Tokyo Verdy 1969 | Edmundo | Report |
| 3 | 13 October 2004 | Jean, Lucas (3) | FC Tokyo | 4–3 (g.g.) | Tokyo Verdy 1969 | Yamada, Hiramoto, Kobayashi | Report |
| 4 | 25 May 2008 | Bruno Quadros, Sahara, Kondo | FC Tokyo | 3–0 | Tokyo Verdy | | Report |
| 5 | 8 June 2008 | Hiroyama, Hulk | Tokyo Verdy | 2–4 | FC Tokyo | Cabore, Hirayama (3) | Report |

=== Friendly ===
| # | Date | Home scorers | Home | Result | Away | Away scorers | Report |
|---|---|---|---|---|---|---|---|
| 1 | 25 February 2007 | Evaldo | FC Tokyo | 1–1 | Tokyo Verdy 1969 | Ono | |
| 2 | 30 January 2016 | Hashimoto | FC Tokyo | 1–0 | Tokyo Verdy | | Report |

== Goalscorers ==
As of 17 October 2026, competitive matches only

| Rank | Player | Club | Goals |
|---|---|---|---|
| 1 | (Brazil) Edmundo | Tokyo Verdy | 4 |
| 1 | (Brazil) Lucas | FC Tokyo | 4 |
| 3 | (Brazil) Amaral | FC Tokyo | 3 |
| 3 | (Japan) Motoki Nagakura | FC Tokyo | 3 |
| 3 | (Japan) Sōta Hirayama | FC Tokyo | 3 |
| 6 | (Japan) Yuta Baba | FC Tokyo; Tokyo Verdy | 2 |
| 6 | (Brazil) Cabore | FC Tokyo | 2 |
| 6 | (Japan) Keita Endo | FC Tokyo | 2 |
| 6 | (Japan) Kentaro Hayashi | Tokyo Verdy | 2 |
| 6 | (Japan) Kazuki Hiramoto | Tokyo Verdy | 2 |
| 6 | (Brazil) Hulk | Tokyo Verdy | 2 |
| 6 | (Japan) Kazunori Iio | Tokyo Verdy | 2 |
| 6 | (Brazil) Jean | FC Tokyo | 2 |
| 6 | (Japan) Yohei Kajiyama | FC Tokyo | 2 |
| 6 | (South Korea) Kim Hyun-seok | Tokyo Verdy | 2 |
| 6 | (Japan) Wagner Lopes | FC Tokyo | 2 |
| 6 | (Japan) Masashi Miyazawa | FC Tokyo | 2 |
| 6 | (Japan) Itsuki Someno | Tokyo Verdy | 2 |
| 6 | (Brazil) Tuto | FC Tokyo | 2 |

== Players who played for both clubs ==
| Player | FC Tokyo | Tokyo Verdy |
|---|---|---|
| (Japan) Ryoichi Kawakatsu | 1990–1991 | 1983–1988 |
| (Japan) Koji Seki | 1994–1995, 1998 | 1990–1993 |
| (Cameroon) Edwin Ifeanyi | 1995–1997 | 1998 |
| (Japan) Tomohiro Hasumi | 1997–1998 | 1990–1995 |
| (Japan) Takuya Sato | 1998–1999 | 2006 |
| (Japan) Osamu Umeyama | 1998–2000, 2001 | 2000 |
| (Japan) Tetsuhiro Kina | 2000–2003 | 2006 |
| (Japan) Yoichi Doi | 2000–2007 | 2008–2012 |
| (Japan) Hiroki Kobayashi | 2002 | 2000 |
| (Japan) Yuta Baba | 2002–2007 | 2009 |
| (Japan) Taisei Fujita | 2005 | 2006–2007 |
| (Japan) Takahiro Shibasaki | 2006 | 2001–2003, 2007–2012, 2014–2021 |
| (Japan) Takashi Fukunishi | 2007 | 2008 |
| (Japan) Masashi Oguro | 2010 | 2008–2009 |
| (Japan) Genki Nagasato | 2011 | 2009 |
| (Japan) Satoshi Tokizawa | 2011–2012 | 2004–2006 |
| (Japan) Hiroki Kawano | 2012–2017 | 2007–2011, 2019–2020 |
| (Japan) Shoya Nakajima | 2014–2017 | 2012–2013 |
| (Japan) Takuma Abe | 2016–2017 | 2010–2012 |
| (Japan) Yoshito Ōkubo | 2017 | 2020 |
| (Japan) Rei Hirakawa | 2017–2019, 2020, 2022 | 2025– |
| (Japan) Fūki Yamada | 2026– | 2024 |
