= 2003 FC Tokyo season =

FC Tokyo
2003 season
- Manager: Hiromi Hara
- Stadium: Ajinomoto Stadium
- J.League 1: 4th
- Emperor's Cup: 4th Round
- J.League Cup: Quarterfinals
- Top goalscorer: Kelly (9)
- Average home league attendance: 24,932
Home colours	Away colours

2003 FC Tokyo season

== Competitions ==
Competitions	Position
J.League 1	4th / 16 clubs
Emperor's Cup	4th round
J.League Cup	Quarterfinals

== Domestic results ==
=== J.League 1 ===
==== First stage ====
Pos	Team	Pld	W	D	L	GF	GA	GD	Pts
2	Júbilo Iwata	15	9	4	2	34	17	+17	31
3	JEF United Ichihara	15	8	3	4	33	20	+13	27
4	FC Tokyo	15	7	4	4	14	11	+3	25
5	Cerezo Osaka	15	8	1	6	29	29	0	25
6	Urawa Red Diamonds	15	7	3	5	25	23	+2	24

Updated to match(es) played on August 2, 2003. Source: J. League Division 1
Rules for classification: 1) points; 2) goal difference; 3) number of goals scored.

22 March 2003 1-1	FC Tokyo	2 – 1	Kashiwa Reysol	Ajinomoto Stadium
16:04	Toda 10'; Kelly 83'	Report	53' Myojin	Attendance: 23,172; Referee: Keiichi Sunakawa

5 April 2003 1-2	Tokyo Verdy 1969	2 – 1	FC Tokyo	Ajinomoto Stadium
15:02	Ramon 68'; Iio 89'	Report	89' Baba	Attendance: 13,222; Referee: Masayoshi Okada

12 April 2003 1-3	Cerezo Osaka	0 – 0	FC Tokyo	Nagai Stadium
15:04		Report		Attendance: 9,109; Referee: Yoshitsugu Katayama

19 April 2003 1-4	FC Tokyo	1 – 1	Nagoya Grampus Eight	Ajinomoto Stadium
19:04	Ishikawa 35'	Report	59' Nakamura	Attendance: 18,383; Referee: Joji Kashihara

26 April 2003 1-5	Kashima Antlers	2 – 0	FC Tokyo	Kashima Soccer Stadium
16:03	Fernando 5'; Euller 89'	Report		Attendance: 14,960; Referee: Toru Kamikawa

29 April 2003 1-6	Vissel Kobe	0 – 1	FC Tokyo	Kobe Wing Stadium
14:04		Report	73' Abe	Attendance: 83,73; Referee: Hiroyuki Umemoto

5 May 2003 1-7	FC Tokyo	1 – 0	Gamba Osaka	Ajinomoto Stadium
14:05	Kelly 85'	Report		Attendance: 27,532; Referee: Hiroyoshi Takayama

10 May 2003 1-8	Yokohama F. Marinos	3 – 2	FC Tokyo	International Stadium Yokohama
15:05	Kubo 5'; Yasunaga 42'; Endo 44'	Report	39' Miura; 85' Kanazawa	Attendance: 21,991; Referee: Yuichi Nishimura

17 May 2003 1-9	FC Tokyo	2 – 1	Oita Trinita	Ajinomoto Stadium
18:33	Abe 16'; Kelly 47'	Report	79' Takamatsu	Attendance: 15,509; Referee: Kazuhisa Osada

24 May 2003 1-10	JEF United Ichihara	0 – 0	FC Tokyo	Ichihara Seaside Stadium
16:03		Report		Attendance: 8,219; Referee: Takuji Shiokawa

6 July 2003 1-11	FC Tokyo	2 – 0	Vegalta Sendai	Ajinomoto Stadium
19:05	Miyazawa 24'; Toda 85'	Report		Attendance: 21,742; Referee: Naotsugu Fuse

12 July 2003 1-12	Urawa Red Diamonds	0 – 1	FC Tokyo	Saitama Stadium 2002
19:04		Report	84' Kelly	Attendance: 33,524; Referee: Toshimitsu Yoshida

19 July 2003 1-13	FC Tokyo	0 – 0	Shimizu S-Pulse	Ajinomoto Stadium
19:04		Report		Attendance: 28,496; Referee: Hiroyoshi Takayama

27 July 2002 1-14	FC Tokyo	1 – 0	Kyoto Purple Sanga	National Olympic Stadium (Tokyo)
19:04	Toda 2'	Report		Attendance: 20,246; Referee: Kiyoshi Ota

2 August 2002 1-15	Júbilo Iwata	1 – 0	FC Tokyo	Yamaha Stadium
19:04	Fujita 75'	Report		Attendance: 16,310; Referee: Masayoshi Okada

==== Second stage ====
Pos	Team	Pld	W	D	L	GF	GA	GD	Pts
3	Júbilo Iwata	15	7	5	3	22	17	+5	26
4	Kashima Antlers	15	6	7	2	21	19	+2	25
5	FC Tokyo	15	6	6	3	32	20	+12	24
6	Urawa Red Diamonds	15	6	5	4	29	19	+10	23
7	Gamba Osaka	15	6	5	4	24	17	+7	23

Updated to match(es) played on November 29, 2003. Source: J. League Division 1
Rules for classification: 1) points; 2) goal difference; 3) number of goals scored.

16 August 2003 2-1	FC Tokyo	2 – 1	Cerezo Osaka	Ajinomoto Stadium
18:30	Amaral 26'; Abe 84'	Report	76' Nunobe	Attendance: 16,061; Referee: Takuji Shiokawa

23 August 2002 2-2	Nagoya Grampus Eight	3 – 2	FC Tokyo	Mizuho Athletic Stadium
19:03	Marques 70'; Ueslei 77'; Okayama 89'	Report	49' Jean; 59' Kelly	Attendance: 12,605; Referee: Naotsugu Fuse

30 August 2003 2-3	FC Tokyo	4 – 1	Yokohama F. Marinos	Ajinomoto Stadium
19:03	Abe 16'; Kanazawa 20'; Toda 30'; Miyazawa 65'	Report	44' Dutra	Attendance: 35,109; Referee: Toru Kamikawa

7 September 2003 2-4	Oita Trinita	0 – 0	FC Tokyo	Ōita Stadium
19:03		Report		Attendance: 18,124; Referee: Keiichi Sunakawa

13 September 2003 2-5	FC Tokyo	2 – 2	JEF United Ichihara	Ajinomoto Stadium
19:04	Miyazawa 18'; Toda 39'	Report	82' Sandro; 88' Hayashi	Attendance: 20,436; Referee: Joji Kashihara

20 September 2003 2-6	Vegalta Sendai	2 – 2	FC Tokyo	Sendai Stadium
16:04	Kim 60'; Iwamoto 74'	Report	33' Kelly; 87' Kondo	Attendance: 18,696; Referee: Takuji Shiokawa

23 September 2003 2-7	FC Tokyo	1 – 2	Júbilo Iwata	Ajinomoto Stadium
15:03	Toda 36'	Report	24' Maeda; 74' Fukunishi	Attendance: 33,880; Referee: Matsumura

27 September 2003 2-8	Kyoto Purple Sanga	1 – 1	FC Tokyo	Nishikyogoku Athletic Stadium
14:02	Kurobe 65'	Report	68' Jean	Attendance: 7,135; Referee: Yuichi Nishimura

4 October 2003 2-9	FC Tokyo	5 – 1	Kashima Antlers	Ajinomoto Stadium
15:04	17' (o.g.); Kelly 32'; Amaral 44'; Toda 68'; Kanazawa 89'	Report	60' (o.g.)	Attendance: 29,725; Referee: Hiroyoshi Takayama

18 October 2003 2-10	FC Tokyo	1 – 1	Urawa Red Diamonds	Ajinomoto Stadium
14:05	47' (o.g.)	Report	39' Emerson	Attendance: 30,066; Referee: Keiichi Sunakawa

25 October 2002 2-11	Shimizu S-Pulse	1 – 3	FC Tokyo	Nihondaira Sports Stadium
15:34	Ahn 75'	Report	8', 74' Ishikawa; 25' Kelly	Attendance: 13,104; Referee: Yuichi Nishimura

9 November 2003 2-12	FC Tokyo	4 – 1	Vissel Kobe	Ajinomoto Stadium
15:03	Kelly 16'; Toda 30'; Miyazawa 36'; Ishikawa 53'	Report	84' Tsuchiya	Attendance: 20,840; Referee: Takuji Shiokawa

15 November 2003 2-13	Gamba Osaka	1 – 0	FC Tokyo	Osaka Expo '70 Stadium
14:03	Oguro 34'	Report		Attendance: 9,188; Referee: Toru Kamikawa

22 November 2003 2-14	FC Tokyo	1 – 1	Tokyo Verdy 1969	Ajinomoto Stadium
16:03	Abe 75'	Report	89' Iio	Attendance: 32,781; Referee: Masayoshi Okada

29 November 2003 2-15	Kashiwa Reysol	4 – 2	FC Tokyo	Hitachi Kashiwa Soccer Stadium
14:03	Hagimura 18'; Watanabe 41'	Report	65' Ishikawa; 79' Abe; 83', 85' Amaral	Attendance: 11,527; Referee: Hiroyoshi Takayama

==== Overall table ====
Pos	Team	Pld	W	D	L	GF	GA	GD	Pts	Qualification or relegation
2	Júbilo Iwata	30	16	9	5	56	34	+22	57	Qualification for AFC Champions League 2004 group stage
3	JEF United Ichihara	30	15	8	7	57	38	+19	53	
4	FC Tokyo	30	13	10	7	46	31	+15	49	
5	Kashima Antlers	30	13	9	8	44	40	+4	48	
6	Urawa Red Diamonds	30	13	8	9	54	42	+12	47	

Updated to match(es) played on November 29, 2003. Source: J. League Division 1 first stage, J. League Division 1 second stage
Rules for classification: 1) points; 2) goal difference; 3) number of goals scored.

=== Emperor's Cup ===
FC Tokyo received a bye to the third round as being part of the J.League Division 1.

14 December 2003 3rd Round	FC Tokyo	2 – 2 (a.e.t.) (6 – 5 p)	Honda FC	Ajinomoto Stadium
	Kondo 5'; Kelly 56'	Report	21' Furuhashi; 69' Abe	Attendance: 8,429; Referee: Yuki Noda

20 December 2003 4th Round	Vissel Kobe	2 – 2 (a.e.t.) (5 – 4 p)	FC Tokyo	Marugame Stadium
	38' Park; 65' Kojima	Report	Abe 72', 90'	Attendance: 5,079; Referee: Tsutomu Anazawa

=== J.League Cup ===
Group B

Team	Pld	W	D	L	GF	GA	GD	Pts
FC Tokyo	6	3	2	1	12	5	+7	11
Yokohama F. Marinos	6	3	2	1	10	5	+5	11
Vegalta Sendai	6	2	1	3	9	11	−2	7
Kashiwa Reysol	6	0	3	3	3	13	−10	3

8 March 2003 GL-B-1	Yokohama F. Marinos	1 – 0	FC Tokyo	International Stadium Yokohama
15:01	Marquinhos 44'	Report		Attendance: 17,115; Referee: Yoshitsugu Katayama

15 March 2003 GL-B-2	FC Tokyo	2 – 2	Yokohama F. Marinos	Ajinomoto Stadium
13:03	Jean 6'; Abe 14'	Report	1' Sato; 50' Endo	Attendance: 10,329; Referee: Toshimitsu Yoshida

9 April 2003 GL-B-3	FC Tokyo	4 – 1	Vegalta Sendai	National Olympic Stadium (Tokyo)
19:03	Toda 8'; Amaral 32', 55'; Baba 89'	Report	41' Yamashita	Attendance: 8,204; Referee: Toru Kamikawa

23 April 2003 GL-B-4	FC Tokyo	4 – 0	Kashiwa Reysol	Ajinomoto Stadium
19:00	Ishikawa 17', 71'; Masashi Miyazawa 56'; Abe 79'	Report		Attendance: 6,756; Referee: Toshimitsu Yoshida

2 July 2003 GL-B-5	Kashiwa Reysol	0 – 0	FC Tokyo	Hitachi Kashiwa Soccer Stadium
19:00		Report		Attendance: 4,367; Referee: Takuji Shiokawa

16 July 2003 GL-B-6	Vegalta Sendai	1 – 2	FC Tokyo	Sendai Stadium
19:00	Sato 32'	Report	71' Ishikawa; 86' Amaral	Attendance: 14,299; Referee: Joji Kashihara

Quarter-finals

13 August 2003 Quarterfinals-1	Urawa Red Diamonds	2 – 2	FC Tokyo	Ajinomoto Stadium
19:04	Emerson 64'; Chishima 89'	Report	28', 86' Toda	Attendance: 15,362; Referee: Toshimitsu Yoshida

27 August 2003 Quarterfinals-2	FC Tokyo	0 – 2 (2 – 4 agg.)	Urawa Red Diamonds	Ajinomoto Stadium
19:04		Report	60', 89' Emerson	Attendance: 17,343; Referee: Akio Okutani

== International results ==
5 August 2003 Friendly	FC Tokyo (Japan)	0–3	(Spain) Real Madrid	Tokyo
		Report	Beckham 37'; Solari 44'; Ronaldo 88'	Stadium: National Stadium; Attendance: 65,000; Referee: Masayoshi Okada (Japan)

== Player statistics ==
No.	Pos.	Player	D.o.B. (Age)	Height / Weight	J.League 1		Emperor's Cup		J.League Cup		Total	
No.	Pos.	Player	D.o.B. (Age)	Height / Weight	Apps	Goals	Apps	Goals	Apps	Goals	Apps	Goals
1	GK	Yoichi Doi	July 25, 1973 (aged 29)	cm / kg	30	0	2	0	6	0	38	0
2	DF	Teruyuki Moniwa	September 8, 1981 (aged 21)	cm / kg	27	0	1	0	7	0	35	0
3	DF	Jean	September 24, 1977 (aged 25)	cm / kg	29	2	1	0	6	1	36	3
4	DF	Shinya Sakoi	May 8, 1977 (aged 25)	cm / kg	0	0	0	0	0	0	0	0
5	MF	Kensuke Kagami	November 21, 1974 (aged 28)	cm / kg	0	0	0	0	0	0	0	0
6	DF	Takayuki Komine	April 25, 1974 (aged 28)	cm / kg	0	0	0	0	0	0	0	0
7	MF	Satoru Asari	June 10, 1974 (aged 28)	cm / kg	22	0	0	0	6	0	28	0
8	DF	Ryuji Fujiyama	June 9, 1973 (aged 29)	cm / kg	12	0	2	0	4	0	18	0
9	FW	Kenji Fukuda	October 21, 1977 (aged 25)	cm / kg	0	0	0	0	0	0	0	0
10	MF	Fumitake Miura	August 12, 1970 (aged 32)	cm / kg	26	1	2	0	4	0	32	1
11	FW	Amaral	October 16, 1966 (aged 36)	cm / kg	25	4	2	0	6	3	33	7
13	FW	Mitsuhiro Toda	September 10, 1977 (aged 25)	cm / kg	30	8	2	0	8	3	40	11
14	FW	Yoshiro Abe	July 5, 1980 (aged 22)	cm / kg	27	6	2	2	7	2	36	10
15	DF	Tetsuya Ito	October 1, 1970 (aged 32)	cm / kg	0	0	0	0	0	0	0	0
16	MF	Masashi Miyazawa	April 24, 1978 (aged 24)	cm / kg	29	4	2	0	8	1	39	5
17	DF	Jo Kanazawa	July 9, 1976 (aged 26)	cm / kg	30	3	2	0	7	0	39	3
18	MF	Naohiro Ishikawa	May 12, 1981 (aged 21)	cm / kg	29	5	1	0	7	3	37	8
19	MF	Kelly	April 28, 1975 (aged 27)	cm / kg	27	9	2	1	8	0	37	10
20	DF	Akira Kaji	January 13, 1980 (aged 23)	cm / kg	22	0	2	0	6	0	30	0
21	GK	Taishi Endo	March 31, 1980 (aged 22)	cm / kg	0	0	0	0	0	0	0	0
22	GK	Hideaki Ozawa	March 17, 1974 (aged 28)	cm / kg	0	0	0	0	2	0	2	0
23	MF	Tetsuhiro Kina	December 10, 1976 (aged 26)	cm / kg	0	0	0	0	0	0	0	0
24	MF	Masamitsu Kobayashi	April 13, 1978 (aged 24)	cm / kg	0	0	0	0	0	0	0	0
25	FW	Yusuke Kondo	December 5, 1984 (aged 18)	cm / kg	6	1	2	1	0	0	8	2
26	MF	Kazuyoshi Suwazono	March 4, 1983 (aged 20)	cm / kg	0	0	0	0	0	0	0	0
27	MF	Norio Suzuki	February 14, 1984 (aged 19)	cm / kg	8	0	1	0	4	0	13	0
28	MF	Keishi Otani	April 17, 1983 (aged 19)	cm / kg	0	0	0	0	0	0	0	0
29	DF	Kazuya Maeda	January 8, 1984 (aged 19)	cm / kg	0	0	0	0	0	0	0	0
30	MF	Yuta Baba	January 22, 1984 (aged 19)	cm / kg	15	1	0	0	5	1	20	2
31	GK	Kenichi Kondo	April 2, 1983 (aged 19)	cm / kg	0	0	0	0	0	0	0	0
32	DF	Hiroyuki Omata	September 1, 1983 (aged 19)	cm / kg	0	0	0	0	0	0	0	0
33	MF	Oh Jang-Eun	July 24, 1985 (aged 17)	cm / kg	4	0	1	0	3	0	8	0
34	MF	Yōhei Kajiyama	September 24, 1985 (aged 17)	cm / kg	3	0	1	0	3	0	7	0
35	DF	Yuhei Tokunaga	September 25, 1983 (aged 19)	cm / kg	8	0	0	0	2	0	10	0

== Other pages ==
- (in Japanese) J. League official site
