= Masashi Miyazawa =

Japanese footballer

Masashi Miyazawa 宮沢 正史
Personal information
- Full name: Masashi Miyazawa
- Date of birth: April 24, 1978 (age 48)
- Place of birth: Kofu, Japan
- Height: 1.75 m (5 ft 9 in)
- Position: Midfielder

Youth career
- 1994–1996: Teikyo Daisan High School
- 1997–2000: Chuo University

Senior career*
Years	Team	Apps	(Gls)
2001–2006	FC Tokyo	112	(11)
2007–2013	Oita Trinita	145	(0)
2008	→Vegalta Sendai (loan)	2	(0)
2014–2015	FC Gifu	46	(1)
Total		305	(12)
Medal record
FC Tokyo
Winner	J.League Cup	2004
- * Club domestic league appearances and goals

Masashi Miyazawa (宮沢 正史, Miyazawa Masashi; born April 24, 1978) is a former Japanese football player.

== Playing career ==
Miyazawa was born in Kofu on April 24, 1978. After graduating from Chuo University, he joined J1 League club FC Tokyo in 2001. Although he debuted in first season, he could hardly play in the match. In 2002, he became a regular player as defensive midfielder. However his opportunity to play decreased behind Yasuyuki Konno and Yohei Kajiyama from 2004. In 2007, he moved to J1 club Oita Trinita. However he could not play many matches. In 2008, he moved to J2 League club Vegalta Sendai on loan. However he could hardly play in the match. In 2009, he returned to Oita Trinita. However he could not play many matches and the club was relegated to J2 end of 2009 season. However the club released many regular players due to their financial problems and he became a regular player from 2010. He also became a captain from 2011. The club was promoted to J1 from 2013. In 2014, he moved to J2 club FC Gifu. He played many matches as regular player in 2014. However his opportunity to play decreased in 2015 and he retired end of 2015 season.

== Career statistics ==
Appearances and goals by club, season and competition
Club	Season	League			Emperor's Cup		J.League Cup		Total	
Club	Season	Division	Apps	Goals	Apps	Goals	Apps	Goals	Apps	Goals
FC Tokyo	2001	J1 League	1	0	1	0	3	0	5	0
FC Tokyo	2002	J1 League	29	4	1	0	7	3	37	7
FC Tokyo	2003	J1 League	29	4	2	0	8	1	39	5
FC Tokyo	2004	J1 League	18	0	2	0	4	0	24	0
FC Tokyo	2005	J1 League	15	2	1	0	5	0	21	2
FC Tokyo	2006	J1 League	20	1	1	0	2	0	23	1
Oita Trinita	2007	J1 League	6	0	1	0	3	0	10	0
Vegalta Sendai	2008	J2 League	2	0	1	0	—		3	0
Oita Trinita	2009	J1 League	12	0	1	0	4	0	17	0
Oita Trinita	2010	J2 League	30	0	2	0	—		32	0
Oita Trinita	2011	J2 League	38	0	1	0	—		39	0
Oita Trinita	2012	J2 League	39	0	1	0	—		40	0
Oita Trinita	2013	J1 League	20	0	4	0	5	0	29	0
FC Gifu	2014	J2 League	31	1	0	0	—		31	1
FC Gifu	2015	J2 League	15	0	2	0	—		17	0
Career total			305	12	21	0	41	4	367	16
