= Teruyuki Moniwa =

Japanese footballer (born 1981)

Teruyuki Moniwa 茂庭 照幸
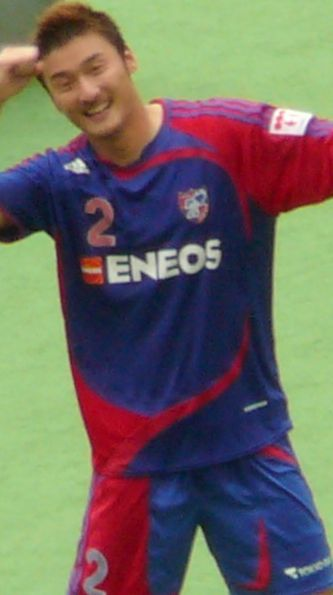
- Moniwa with FC Tokyo in September 2007

Personal information
- Full name: Teruyuki Moniwa
- Date of birth: 8 September 1981 (age 45)
- Place of birth: Atsugi, Kanagawa, Japan
- Height: 1.81 m (5 ft 11 in)
- Position: Centre back

Youth career
- 1994–1999: Bellmare Hiratsuka

Senior career*
| Years | Team | Apps | (Gls) |
| 1999–2001 | Shonan Bellmare | 52 | (0) |
| 2002–2009 | FC Tokyo | 172 | (1) |
| 2010–2013 | Cerezo Osaka | 116 | (0) |
| 2014 | Bangkok Glass | 32 | (0) |
| 2015–2018 | Cerezo Osaka | 35 | (2) |
| 2016–2018 | →Cerezo Osaka U-23 (loan) | 6 | (0) |
| 2019–2022 | Maruyasu Okazaki | 27 | (0) |
| 2023 | FC Kariya | 3 | (1) |

International career
| 2004 | Japan U-23 | 3 | (0) |
| 2003–2006 | Japan | 9 | (1) |
Medal record
Representing Japan
Asian Games
| Silver medal – second place | 2002 Busan | Team |
- * Club domestic league appearances and goals as of 1 January 2020

Teruyuki Moniwa (茂庭 照幸, Moniwa Teruyuki; born 8 September 1981) is a Japanese former professional footballer who played as a centre back.

== Club career ==
Moniwa was born in Atsugi on 8 September 1981. He joined J1 League club Bellmare Hiratsuka (later Shonan Bellmare) from youth team in 1999. Although he played many matches as center back from first season, the club finished at the bottom place and was relegated to J2 League. He became a regular player from summer 2001.

In 2002, Moniwa moved to J1 club FC Tokyo. He played many matches as center back with Jean until 2006. the club won the champions in 2004 J.League Cup which is first major title in the club history. However his opportunity to play decreased for injuries from 2007 and he could only 9 matches in 2009 season.

In 2010, Moniwa moved to Cerezo Osaka. He played many matches as regular center back until 2012. However he lost his opportunity to play for injury from July.

In 2014, Moniwa moved to Thailand and signed with Bangkok Glass.

In 2015, Moniwa returned to Japan and re-joined Cerezo Osaka which was relegated to J2 from 2015 season. Cerezo was at the 4th place in J2 for 2 years in a row and was promoted to J1 end of 2016 season. In 2017, Cerezo finished at 3rd place in J1 League and won the champions in J.League Cup an Emperor's Cup. However he could hardly play in the match in 2017 and he could not play at all in the match in 2018.

On 28 January 2019, Moniwa joined FC Maruyasu Okazaki.

== International career ==
Moniwa made his international debut for Japan in a friendly against Tunisia on 8 October 2003. He scored his first international goal on 3 August 2005 against China PR in an East Asian Cup match.

Moniwa was a member of the Japanese U-23 team at the 2004 Olympics and played full-time in all 3 matches. He was a late entry in Japan's 2006 World Cup squad, being called up after Makoto Tanaka was injured when he was spending his vacation in Hawaii. He replaced Keisuke Tsuboi in the 56th minute of Japan's first match against Australia after Tsuboi developed cramps in both thighs. He played 9 games and scored 1 goal for Japan until 2006.

== Career statistics ==
=== Club ===
As of 1 January 2020

Appearances and goals by club, season and competition
| Club | Season | League | | | Emperor's Cup | | J.League Cup | | Asia | | Other | | Total | |
| Club | Season | Division | Apps | Goals | Apps | Goals | Apps | Goals | Apps | Goals | Apps | Goals | Apps | Goals |
|---|---|---|---|---|---|---|---|---|---|---|---|---|---|---|
| Bellmare Hiratsuka | 1999 | J1 League | 11 | 0 | 1 | 0 | 1 | 0 | – | | – | | 13 | 0 |
| Shonan Bellmare | 2000 | J2 League | 12 | 0 | 0 | 0 | 2 | 0 | – | | – | | 14 | 0 |
| Shonan Bellmare | 2001 | J2 League | 29 | 0 | 2 | 0 | 2 | 0 | – | | – | | 33 | 0 |
| Shonan Bellmare | Total | | 52 | 0 | 3 | 0 | 5 | 0 | – | | – | | 60 | 0 |
| FC Tokyo | 2002 | J1 League | 19 | 0 | 1 | 0 | 1 | 0 | – | | – | | 21 | 0 |
| FC Tokyo | 2003 | J1 League | 27 | 0 | 1 | 0 | 7 | 0 | – | | – | | 35 | 0 |
| FC Tokyo | 2004 | J1 League | 22 | 1 | 1 | 0 | 6 | 0 | – | | – | | 29 | 1 |
| FC Tokyo | 2005 | J1 League | 32 | 0 | 2 | 0 | 6 | 0 | – | | – | | 40 | 0 |
| FC Tokyo | 2006 | J1 League | 24 | 0 | 0 | 0 | 4 | 0 | – | | – | | 28 | 0 |
| FC Tokyo | 2007 | J1 League | 17 | 0 | 3 | 0 | 3 | 0 | – | | – | | 23 | 0 |
| FC Tokyo | 2008 | J1 League | 22 | 0 | 2 | 0 | 7 | 0 | – | | – | | 31 | 0 |
| FC Tokyo | 2009 | J1 League | 9 | 0 | 0 | 0 | 3 | 0 | – | | – | | 12 | 0 |
| FC Tokyo | Total | | 172 | 1 | 10 | 0 | 37 | 0 | – | | – | | 219 | 1 |
| Cerezo Osaka | 2010 | J1 League | 34 | 0 | 3 | 0 | 6 | 0 | – | | – | | 43 | 0 |
| Cerezo Osaka | 2011 | J1 League | 33 | 0 | 5 | 0 | 1 | 0 | 8 | 0 | – | | 47 | 0 |
| Cerezo Osaka | 2012 | J1 League | 33 | 0 | 3 | 0 | 8 | 0 | – | | – | | 44 | 0 |
| Cerezo Osaka | 2013 | J1 League | 16 | 0 | 2 | 0 | 5 | 0 | – | | – | | 23 | 0 |
| Cerezo Osaka | Total | | 116 | 0 | 13 | 0 | 20 | 0 | 8 | 0 | – | | 157 | 0 |
| Bangkok Glass | 2014 | Premier League | 32 | 0 | – | | – | | – | | – | | 32 | 0 |
| Cerezo Osaka | 2015 | J2 League | 14 | 2 | 0 | 0 | – | | – | | 2 (Note: Appearances in J2 Play-offs) | 0 | 16 | 2 |
| Cerezo Osaka | 2016 | J2 League | 20 | 0 | 2 | 0 | – | | – | | 0 | 0 | 22 | 0 |
| Cerezo Osaka | 2017 | J1 League | 1 | 0 | 4 | 0 | 9 | 0 | – | | – | | 14 | 0 |
| Cerezo Osaka | 2018 | J1 League | 0 | 0 | 0 | 0 | 0 | 0 | – | | – | | 0 | 0 |
| Cerezo Osaka | Total | | 35 | 2 | 6 | 0 | 9 | 0 | – | | 2 | 0 | 52 | 2 |
| Cerezo Osaka U-23 | 2016 | J3 League | 2 | 0 | – | | – | | – | | – | | 2 | 0 |
| Cerezo Osaka U-23 | 2017 | J3 League | 4 | 0 | – | | – | | – | | – | | 4 | 0 |
| Cerezo Osaka U-23 | Total | | 6 | 0 | – | | – | | – | | – | | 6 | 0 |
| FC Maruyasu Okazaki | 2019 | JFL | 15 | 0 | – | | – | | – | | – | | 15 | 0 |
| Career total | | | 428 | 3 | 32 | 0 | 71 | 0 | 8 | 0 | 2 | 0 | 541 | 3 |

=== International ===
Appearances and goals by national team and year
| National team | Year | Apps | Goals |
|---|---|---|---|
| Japan | 2003 | 2 | 0 |
| Japan | 2004 | 1 | 0 |
| Japan | 2005 | 4 | 1 |
| Japan | 2006 | 2 | 0 |
| Total | | 9 | 1 |

Score and result list Japan's goal tally first, score column indicates score after Moniwa goal.

International goal scored by Teruyuki Moniwa
| No. | Date | Venue | Opponent | Score | Result | Competition |
|---|---|---|---|---|---|---|
| 1 | 3 August 2005 | Daejeon, Korea Republic | China | | 2–2 | East Asian Football Championship 2005 |
