= 2004 FC Tokyo season =

FC Tokyo
2004 season
- Manager: Hiromi Hara
- Stadium: Ajinomoto Stadium
- J.League 1: 8th
- Emperor's Cup: Quarterfinals
- J.League Cup: Champions
- Top goalscorer: Lucas (11)
- Average home league attendance: 25,438
Home colours	Away colours	Third colours

During the 2004 season, FC Tokyo competed in the J.League 1, in which they finished 8th.

== Competitions ==
Competitions	Position
J.League 1	8th / 16 clubs
Emperor's Cup	Quarterfinals
J.League Cup	Champions

== Domestic results ==
=== J.League 1 ===
Match	Date	Venue	Opponents	Score
1-1	2004.3.13	Ajinomoto Stadium	Albirex Niigata	1-0
1-2	2004.3.20	Oita Stadium	Oita Trinita	2-1
1-3	2004.4.3	Ajinomoto Stadium	Tokyo Verdy 1969	3-2
1-4	2004.4.11	Nihondaira Sports Stadium	Shimizu S-Pulse	0-0
1-5	2004.4.14	Ajinomoto Stadium	Cerezo Osaka	1-1
1-6	2004.4.17	Yamaha Stadium	Júbilo Iwata	2-0
1-7	2004.5.2	Ajinomoto Stadium	Yokohama F. Marinos	0-2
1-8	2004.5.5	Kobe Universiade Memorial Stadium	Vissel Kobe	1-2
1-9	2004.5.9	National Stadium	Kashiwa Reysol	2-1
1-10	2004.5.16	Ajinomoto Stadium	Sanfrecce Hiroshima	1-1
1-11	2004.5.22	Kashima Soccer Stadium	Kashima Antlers	0-0
1-12	2004.6.12	Ajinomoto Stadium	Gamba Osaka	2-1
1-13	2004.6.16	Ichihara Seaside Stadium	JEF United Ichihara	2-2
1-14	2004.6.19	Ajinomoto Stadium	Nagoya Grampus Eight	3-2
1-15	2004.6.26	Saitama Stadium 2002	Urawa Red Diamonds	2-1
2-1	2004.8.14	Nagai Stadium	Cerezo Osaka	4-3
2-2	2004.8.21	Ajinomoto Stadium	Shimizu S-Pulse	1-2
2-3	2004.8.29	National Stadium	Tokyo Verdy 1969	0-1
2-4	2004.9.11	Ajinomoto Stadium	Vissel Kobe	3-1
2-5	2004.9.19	Kashiwanoha Stadium	Kashiwa Reysol	1-1
2-6	2004.9.23	Ajinomoto Stadium	Urawa Red Diamonds	1-0
2-7	2004.9.26	Ajinomoto Stadium	Kashima Antlers	0-1
2-8	2004.10.2	Toyota Stadium	Nagoya Grampus Eight	1-1
2-9	2004.10.17	National Stadium	Júbilo Iwata	0-0
2-10	2004.10.23	International Stadium Yokohama	Yokohama F. Marinos	2-1
2-11	2004.10.31	Hiroshima Big Arch	Sanfrecce Hiroshima	1-1
2-12	2004.11.6	Ajinomoto Stadium	Oita Trinita	1-1
2-13	2004.11.20	Niigata Stadium	Albirex Niigata	4-2
2-14	2004.11.23	Ajinomoto Stadium	JEF United Ichihara	3-3
2-15	2004.11.28	Osaka Expo '70 Stadium	Gamba Osaka	1-2

=== Emperor's Cup ===
Match	Date	Venue	Opponents	Score
4th round	2004.11.13	Sendai Stadium	Vegalta Sendai	0-1
5th round	2004.12.12	Kagoshima Kamoike Stadium	Omiya Ardija	6-3
Quarterfinals	2004.12.19	Saitama Stadium 2002	Urawa Red Diamonds	2-1

=== J.League Cup ===
Match	Date	Venue	Opponents	Score
GL-D-1	2004.3.27	Ajinomoto Stadium	Kashima Antlers	1-2
GL-D-2	2004.4.29	Kashima Soccer Stadium	Kashima Antlers	1-2
GL-D-3	2004.5.29	Kashiwanoha Stadium	Kashiwa Reysol	0-2
GL-D-4	2004.6.5	National Stadium	Vissel Kobe	2-1
GL-D-5	2004.7.17	Kobe Wing Stadium	Vissel Kobe	1-2
GL-D-6	2004.7.24	Ajinomoto Stadium	Kashiwa Reysol	1-1
Quarterfinals	2004.9.4	National Stadium	Gamba Osaka	4-1
Semifinals	2004.10.13	Ajinomoto Stadium	Tokyo Verdy 1969	4-3
Final	2004.11.3	National Stadium	Urawa Red Diamonds	0-0 a.e.t. (4-2 pen.)

== Player statistics ==
No.	Pos.	Player	D.o.B. (Age)	Height / Weight	J.League 1		Emperor's Cup		J.League Cup		Total	
No.	Pos.	Player	D.o.B. (Age)	Height / Weight	Apps	Goals	Apps	Goals	Apps	Goals	Apps	Goals
1	GK	Yoichi Doi	July 25, 1973 (aged 30)	cm / kg	30	0						
2	DF	Teruyuki Moniwa	September 8, 1981 (aged 22)	cm / kg	22	1						
3	DF	Jean	September 24, 1977 (aged 26)	cm / kg	26	3						
4	MF	Oh Jang-Eun	July 24, 1985 (aged 18)	cm / kg	7	0						
5	DF	Tatsuya Masushima	April 22, 1985 (aged 18)	cm / kg	7	0						
6	DF	Yasuyuki Konno	January 25, 1983 (aged 21)	cm / kg	26	4						
7	MF	Satoru Asari	June 10, 1974 (aged 29)	cm / kg	9	0						
8	DF	Ryuji Fujiyama	June 9, 1973 (aged 30)	cm / kg	18	0						
9	FW	Lucas Severino	January 3, 1979 (aged 25)	cm / kg	27	11						
10	MF	Fumitake Miura	August 12, 1970 (aged 33)	cm / kg	22	2						
11	FW	Yoshiro Abe	July 5, 1980 (aged 23)	cm / kg	28	4						
13	FW	Mitsuhiro Toda	September 10, 1977 (aged 26)	cm / kg	22	2						
14	MF	Yuta Baba	January 22, 1984 (aged 20)	cm / kg	26	3						
15	MF	Norio Suzuki	February 14, 1984 (aged 20)	cm / kg	14	4						
16	MF	Masashi Miyazawa	April 24, 1978 (aged 25)	cm / kg	18	0						
17	DF	Jo Kanazawa	July 9, 1976 (aged 27)	cm / kg	24	0						
18	MF	Naohiro Ishikawa	May 12, 1981 (aged 22)	cm / kg	17	0						
19	MF	Kelly	April 28, 1975 (aged 28)	cm / kg	15	4						
20	DF	Akira Kaji	January 13, 1980 (aged 24)	cm / kg	22	0						
21	GK	Taishi Endo	March 31, 1980 (aged 23)	cm / kg	0	0						
22	GK	Hitoshi Shiota	May 28, 1981 (aged 22)	cm / kg	0	0						
23	MF	Yōhei Kajiyama	September 24, 1985 (aged 18)	cm / kg	16	2						
24	MF	Masamitsu Kobayashi	April 13, 1978 (aged 25)	cm / kg	1	0						
25	FW	Yusuke Kondo	December 5, 1984 (aged 19)	cm / kg	9	0						
26	DF	Ryo Nakamura	August 13, 1981 (aged 22)	cm / kg	0	0						
27	FW	Tadanari Lee	December 19, 1985 (aged 18)	cm / kg	0	0						
28	MF	Keishi Otani	April 17, 1983 (aged 20)	cm / kg	0	0						
29	DF	Kazuya Maeda	January 8, 1984 (aged 20)	cm / kg	1	0						
30	DF	Takatoshi Matsumoto	September 5, 1983 (aged 20)	cm / kg	0	0						
31	GK	Kenichi Kondo	April 2, 1983 (aged 20)	cm / kg	0	0						
32	DF	Yuhei Tokunaga	September 25, 1983 (aged 20)	cm / kg	6	0						
33	MF	Ryoichi Kurisawa	September 5, 1982 (aged 21)	cm / kg	6	0						

== Other pages ==
- (in Japanese) J. League official site
