= 2002 FC Tokyo season =

F.C. Tokyo
2002 season
- Chairman: Masahiro Tsubahara
- Manager: Hiromi Hara
- Stadium: Tokyo Stadium
- J. League 1: 9th
- Emperor's Cup: 3rd Round
- J. League Cup: Quarterfinals
- Top goalscorer: Amaral (15)
- Average home league attendance: 22,173
Home colours	Away colours

2002 F.C. Tokyo season

== Competitions ==
Competitions	Position
J. League 1	9th / 16 clubs
Emperor's Cup	3rd Round
J. League Cup	Quarterfinals

== Domestic results ==
=== J. League 1 ===
==== First stage ====
Pos	Team	Pld	W	OTW	D	L	GF	GA	GD	Pts
8	JEF United Ichihara	15	6	1	3	5	22	23	−1	23
9	Vegalta Sendai (Note: Promoted from 2001 J.League Division 2)	15	6	1	0	8	23	27	−4	20
10	FC Tokyo	15	5	0	2	8	23	27	−4	17
11	Urawa Red Diamonds	15	3	2	1	9	21	24	−3	14
12	Tokyo Verdy 1969	15	2	3	1	9	15	24	−9	13

Source: J.League Data Site
Notes:

2 March 2002 1-1	F.C. Tokyo	4 - 2	Kashima Antlers	Tokyo Stadium
15:00	Kobayashi 11', 52'; Ito 17'; Kelly 44'	Report	79' Hirase; 89' Akita	Attendance: 30,651; Referee: Masayoshi Okada

9 March 2002 1-2	Urawa Red Diamonds	0 - 1	F.C. Tokyo	Saitama Stadium 2002
19:05		Report	50' Kobayashi	Attendance: 33,018; Referee: Kiyoshi Ota

16 March 2002 1-3	F.C. Tokyo	1 - 1	Yokohama F. Marinos	Tokyo Stadium
19:04	Kelly 89'	Report	75' Will	Attendance: 26,217; Referee: Hiroyuki Umemoto

31 March 2002 1-4	Shimizu S-Pulse	2-1 a.e.t.	F.C. Tokyo	Nihondaira Sports Stadium
13:04	Masaaki Sawanobori 72'; Cvitanović 94'	Report	28' Amaral	Attendance: 14,111; Referee: Keiichi Sunakawa

6 April 2002 1-5	F.C. Tokyo	1 - 1	JEF United Ichihara	National Olympic Stadium (Tokyo)
16:03	Miyazawa 61'	Report	44' Chano	Attendance: 14,747; Referee: Joji Kashiwabara

13 April 2002 1-6	Gamba Osaka	5 - 0	F.C. Tokyo	Osaka Expo '70 Stadium
14:02	22' (o.g.); Matsunami 32', 42'; Araiba 57'; Yoshihara 69'	Report		Attendance: 4,883; Referee: Toshimitsu Yoshida

21 April 2002 1-7	Vegalta Sendai	3 - 1	F.C. Tokyo	Sendai Stadium
15:03	Omura 60'; Yamashita 75', 86'	Report	84' Kelly	Attendance: 18,919; Referee: Yoshitsugu Katayama

14 July 2002 1-8	F.C. Tokyo	4 - 0	Sanfrecce Hiroshima	Tokyo Stadium
19:03	Toda 37', 43', 84'; Miyazawa 70'	Report		Attendance: 18,655; Referee: Knud Erik Fisker

20 July 2002 1-9	F.C. Tokyo	0 - 2	Júbilo Iwata	Tokyo Stadium
19:04		Report	Takahara 16', 66'	Attendance: 45,925; Referee: Kazuhiko Matsumura

24 July 2002 1-10	Tokyo Verdy 1969	2 - 1	F.C. Tokyo	Tokyo Stadium
19:03	Edmundo 59', 63'	Report	23' Amaral	Attendance: 18,088; Referee: Toru Kamikawa

28 July 2002 1-11	F.C. Tokyo	3 - 1	Consadole Sapporo	National Olympic Stadium (Tokyo)
19:04	Kelly 11'; Ishikawa 21'; Toda 33'	Report	54' Baljak	Attendance: 20,326; Referee: Kazuhisa Osada

3 August 2002 1-12	Kashiwa Reysol	1 - 3	F.C. Tokyo	Hitachi Kashiwa Soccer Stadium
19:04	Kitajima 52'	Report	38', 63', 75' Amaral	Attendance: 12,191; Referee: Masayoshi Okada

7 August 2002 1-13	F.C. Tokyo	1 - 3	Kyoto Purple Sanga	Tokyo Stadium
19:03	Amaral 40'	Report	46' Suzuki; 57' Park; 64' Kurobe	Attendance: 13,627; Referee: Lucílio Batista

10 August 2002 1-14	Vissel Kobe	2-1 a.e.t.	F.C. Tokyo	Kobe Universiade Memorial Stadium
18:58	Sidiclei 82'; Miura 115'	Report	20' Amaral	Attendance: 8,747; Referee: Knud Erik Fisker

17 August 2002 1-15	F.C. Tokyo	1 - 2	Nagoya Grampus Eight	Tokyo Stadium
19:00	Ishikawa 38'	Report	48' Nakamura; 89' Vastić	Attendance: 20,001; Referee: Akio Okutani

==== Second stage ====
Pos	Team	Pld	W	OTW	D	L	GF	GA	GD	Pts
3	Kashima Antlers (Note: Champion from 2001 J.League Division 1)	15	8	1	0	6	25	21	+4	26
4	Tokyo Verdy 1969	15	6	2	2	5	26	19	+7	24
5	FC Tokyo	15	6	2	0	7	20	19	+1	22
6	Yokohama F. Marinos	15	5	3	1	6	16	16	0	22
7	Kyoto Purple Sanga (Note: Promoted from 2001 J.League Division 2)	15	6	2	0	7	18	24	−6	22

Source: J.League Data Site
Notes:

1 September 2002 2-1	JEF United Ichihara	0 - 1	F.C. Tokyo	Ichihara Seaside Stadium
18:34		Report	76' Kelly	Attendance: 6,310; Referee: Kiyoshi Ota

7 September 2002 2-2	F.C. Tokyo	1 - 0	Gamba Osaka	Tokyo Stadium
18:35	Amaral 66'	Report		Attendance: 20,646; Referee: Masayoshi Okada

14 September 2002 2-3	Sanfrecce Hiroshima	1-2 a.e.t.	F.C. Tokyo	Hiroshima Big Arch
19:03	Mogi 23'; Erceg 107'	Report	67' Ishikawa	Attendance: 9,687; Referee: Yoshitsugu Katayama

18 September 2002 2-4	F.C. Tokyo	2 - 1	Tokyo Verdy 1969	Tokyo Stadium
19:05	Amaral 31'; Kelly 57'	Report	17' Edmundo	Attendance: 13,640; Referee: Matsuzaki

22 September 2002 2-5	Júbilo Iwata	6 - 1	F.C. Tokyo	Yamaha Stadium
15:03	Fujita 1'; Takahara 15', 47', 68', 87'; Nakayama 89'	Report	66' Fukuda	Attendance: 12,849; Referee: Toru Kamikawa

28 September 2002 2-6	Yokohama F. Marinos	2 - 1	F.C. Tokyo	International Stadium Yokohama
14:04	Will 29'; Oku 89'	Report	10' Amaral	Attendance: 14,554; Referee: Hirofumi Yamanishi

5 October 2002 2-7	F.C. Tokyo	0 - 1	Kashiwa Reysol	Tokyo Stadium
16:04		Report	84' Kato	Attendance: 16,682; Referee: Hiroyuki Umemoto

12 October 2002 2-8	Consadole Sapporo	0 - 4	F.C. Tokyo	Sapporo Atsubetsu Park Stadium
14:00		Report	7' Amaral; 18', 66' Kelly; 69' Kaji	Attendance: 11,921; Referee: Joji Kashihara

19 October 2002 2-9	F.C. Tokyo	3-2 a.e.t.	Vissel Kobe	National Olympic Stadium (Tokyo)
19:04	Amaral 29'; Jean 50'; Miyazawa 90'	Report	25' Mochizuki; 52' Oséas	Attendance: 13,024; Referee: Matsuzaki

23 October 2002 2-10	Kyoto Purple Sanga	0 - 1	F.C. Tokyo	Nishikyogoku Athletic Stadium
19:04		Report	19' Amaral	Attendance: 5,535; Referee: Yoshitsugu Katayama

26 October 2002 2-11	F.C. Tokyo	2 - 0	Vegalta Sendai	Tokyo Stadium
18:35	Amaral 3', 36'	Report		Attendance: 17,930; Referee: Keiichi Sunakawa

9 November 2002 2-12	Nagoya Grampus Eight	1 - 0	F.C. Tokyo	Mizuho Athletic Stadium
15:02	Hara 88'	Report		Attendance: 10,464; Referee: Jose João Mendes Pratas

16 November 2002 2-13	F.C. Tokyo	1 - 2	Shimizu S-Pulse	Tokyo Stadium
14:06	Miyazawa 7'	Report	3' Ahn; 49' Santos	Attendance: 24,375; Referee: Masayoshi Okada

24 November 2002 2-14	F.C. Tokyo	1-0 a.e.t.	Urawa Red Diamonds	Tokyo Stadium
15:04	Fukuda 118'	Report		Attendance: 36,151; Referee: Kiyoshi Ota

30 November 2002 2-15	Kashima Antlers	2 - 1	F.C. Tokyo	Kashima Soccer Stadium
14:04	Akita 14'; Euller 88'	Report	28' Ishikawa	Attendance: 22,834; Referee: Kazuhiko Matsumura

=== Emperor's Cup ===
15 December 2002 3rd Round	F.C. Tokyo	3-4 a.e.t.	Shonan Bellmare	Tokyo Stadium
	Abe 17', 51'; Suzuki 46'		14' Sakamoto; 40', 67' Toda; 103' Kato	Attendance: 7,310; Referee: Junichi Kabasawa

=== J. League Cup ===
Pos	Team	Pld	W	D	L	GF	GA	GD	Pts	Qualification
1	FC Tokyo	6	4	1	1	8	3	+5	13	Quarterfinals
2	Shimizu S-Pulse	6	4	0	2	9	8	+1	12	Quarterfinals
3	Tokyo Verdy 1969	6	2	1	3	10	10	0	7	
4	Vissel Kobe	6	0	2	4	5	11	−6	2	

Source: rsssf.com

27 April 2002 GL-B-1	F.C. Tokyo	3 - 0	Shimizu S-Pulse	Komazawa Stadium
13:00	Miyazawa 19'; Kelly 44'; Fukuda 78'	Report		Attendance: 11,393; Referee: Tetsuya Hamana

30 April 2002 GL-B-2	Tokyo Verdy 1969	0 - 1	F.C. Tokyo	Tokyo Stadium
19:00		Report	41' Miyazawa	Attendance: 5,373; Referee: Kiyoshi Ota

3 May 2002 GL-B-3	Vissel Kobe	0 - 0	F.C. Tokyo	Kobe Universiade Memorial Stadium
15:00		Report		Attendance: 9,395; Referee: Masayoshi Okada

6 May 2002 GL-B-4	F.C. Tokyo	1 - 0	Vissel Kobe	Tokyo Stadium
15:00	Fukuda 62'	Report		Attendance: 14,192; Referee: Yasuhiro Henmi

9 May 2002 GL-B-5	F.C. Tokyo	2 - 1	Tokyo Verdy 1969	National Olympic Stadium (Tokyo)
19:00	Amaral 64'; Miyazawa 87'	Report	57' Edmundo	Attendance: 6,585; Referee: Hiroyuki Umemoto

12 May 2002 GL-B-6	Shimizu S-Pulse	2 - 1	F.C. Tokyo	Nihondaira Sports Stadium
13:04	Kuboyama 22', 32'	Report	84' Fukuda	Attendance: 4,521; Referee: Toshimitsu Yoshida

4 September 2002 Quarterfinals	F.C. Tokyo	1 - 3	Gamba Osaka	Tokyo Stadium
19:03	Toda 28'	Report	53' Endo; 62' Araiba; 76'Oguro	Attendance: 10,895; Referee: Joji Kashihara

== International results ==
28 May 2002 Training match	FC Tokyo	0–0	Argentina	Naraha, Fukushima
		Report		Stadium: J-Village Stadium
Note: The match was played in two halves of 25 minutes each.

== Player statistics ==
No.	Pos.	Player	D.o.B. (Age)	Height / Weight	J. League 1		Emperor's Cup		J. League Cup		Total	
No.	Pos.	Player	D.o.B. (Age)	Height / Weight	Apps	Goals	Apps	Goals	Apps	Goals	Apps	Goals
1	GK	Yoichi Doi	July 25, 1973 (aged 28)	184cm / 80kg	30	0	1	0	7	0	38	0
2	DF	Teruyuki Moniwa	September 8, 1981 (aged 20)	181cm / 77kg	19	0	1	0	1	0	21	0
3	DF	Jean	September 24, 1977 (aged 24)	184cm / 75kg	27	1	1	0	6	0	34	1
4	DF	Mitsunori Yamao	April 13, 1973 (aged 28)	cm / kg	0	0	0	0	1	0	1	0
4	MF	Heber Oliveira	March 11, 1983 (aged 18)	cm / kg	0	0	0	0	0	0	0	0
5	MF	Takahiro Shimotaira	December 18, 1971 (aged 30)	175cm / 70kg	23	0	1	0	6	0	30	0
6	DF	Takayuki Komine	April 25, 1974 (aged 27)	172cm / 73kg	8	0	0	0	2	0	10	0
7	MF	Satoru Asari	June 10, 1974 (aged 27)	176cm / 70kg	19	0	1	0	0	0	20	0
8	DF	Ryuji Fujiyama	June 9, 1973 (aged 28)	170cm / 68kg	20	0	1	0	5	0	26	0
9	FW	Kenji Fukuda	October 21, 1977 (aged 24)	179cm / 73kg	21	2	0	0	7	3	28	5
10	MF	Fumitake Miura	August 12, 1970 (aged 31)	174cm / 72kg	2	0	1	0	0	0	3	0
11	FW	Amaral	October 16, 1966 (aged 35)	183cm / 76kg	29	15	0	0	6	1	35	16
13	FW	Mitsuhiro Toda	September 10, 1977 (aged 24)	179cm / 72kg	23	4	0	0	7	1	30	5
14	MF	Yukihiko Sato	May 11, 1976 (aged 25)	177cm / 70kg	13	0	0	0	3	0	16	0
15	DF	Tetsuya Ito	October 1, 1970 (aged 31)	179cm / 72kg	23	1	0	0	6	0	29	1
16	MF	Masashi Miyazawa	April 24, 1978 (aged 23)	174cm / 65kg	29	4	1	0	7	3	37	7
17	DF	Minoru Kobayashi	May 14, 1976 (aged 25)	170cm / 62kg	8	0	0	0	1	0	9	0
18	FW	Masatoshi Matsuda	September 4, 1980 (aged 21)	185cm / 79kg	2	0	1	0	1	0	4	0
19	MF	Kelly	April 28, 1975 (aged 26)	178cm / 77kg	29	8	0	0	6	1	35	9
20	DF	Akira Kaji	January 13, 1980 (aged 22)	175cm / 67kg	20	1	1	0	6	0	27	1
21	GK	Taishi Endo	March 31, 1980 (aged 21)	183cm / 77kg	0	0	0	0	0	0	0	0
22	GK	Hideaki Ozawa	March 17, 1974 (aged 27)	188cm / 84kg	0	0	0	0	0	0	0	0
23	MF	Tetsuhiro Kina	December 10, 1976 (aged 25)	178cm / 72kg	12	0	0	0	0	0	12	0
24	MF	Masamitsu Kobayashi	April 13, 1978 (aged 23)	174cm / 67kg	6	3	0	0	0	0	6	3
25	MF	Daisuke Hoshi	December 10, 1980 (aged 21)	172cm / 62kg	9	0	0	0	5	0	14	0
26	MF	Kazuyoshi Suwazono	March 4, 1983 (aged 18)	cm / kg	0	0	0	0	0	0	0	0
26	FW	Yoshiro Abe	July 5, 1980 (aged 21)	cm / kg	0	0	1	2	0	0	1	2
27	MF	Norio Suzuki	February 14, 1984 (aged 18)	177cm / 72kg	3	0	1	1	0	0	4	1
28	MF	Keishi Otani	April 17, 1983 (aged 18)	173cm / 65kg	0	0	0	0	0	0	0	0
29	DF	Kazuya Maeda	January 8, 1984 (aged 18)	181cm / 77kg	1	0	0	0	3	0	4	0
30	MF	Yuta Baba	January 22, 1984 (aged 18)	175cm / 64kg	8	0	1	0	3	0	12	0
31	GK	Kenichi Kondo	April 2, 1983 (aged 18)	185cm / 75kg	0	0	0	0	0	0	0	0
32	DF	Hiroyuki Omata	September 1, 1983 (aged 18)	180cm / 69kg	1	0	0	0	0	0	1	0
33	MF	Oh Jang-Eun	July 24, 1985 (aged 16)	174cm / 65kg	2	0	0	0	1	0	3	0
34	MF	Marcelo Mattos	February 10, 1984 (aged 18)	cm / kg	1	0	0	0	1	0	2	0
34	MF	Kensuke Kagami	November 21, 1974 (aged 27)	186cm / 81kg	0	0	0	0	0	0	0	0
35	GK	Hiroki Kobayashi	May 24, 1977 (aged 24)	185cm / 85kg	0	0	0	0	0	0	0	0
36	MF	Naohiro Ishikawa	May 12, 1981 (aged 20)	175cm / 66kg	19	4	1	0	3	0	23	4

== Other pages ==
- (in Japanese) J. League official site
- (in Japanese) List of F.C.Tokyo players 2002 - J.League Official site
