= Fumitake Miura =

Japanese footballer and manager

Fumitake Miura 三浦 文丈
Personal information
- Full name: Fumitake Miura
- Date of birth: August 12, 1970 (age 56)
- Place of birth: Shizuoka, Shizuoka, Japan
- Height: 1.74 m (5 ft 9 in)
- Position: Midfielder

Youth career
- 1986–1988: Shimizu Commercial High School

College career
Years	Team	Apps	(Gls)
1989–1992	University of Tsukuba		

Senior career*
Years	Team	Apps	(Gls)
1993–1998	Yokohama Marinos	146	(26)
1999	Kyoto Purple Sanga	23	(4)
1999–2000	Júbilo Iwata	26	(1)
2001–2006	FC Tokyo	100	(6)
Total		295	(37)

Managerial career
- 2016: AC Nagano Parceiro
- 2017: Albirex Niigata
- 2019–2021: SC Sagamihara
- 2025: Yokohama FC
- 2026: Júbilo Iwata
Medal record
Yokohama Marinos
Winner	J1 League	1995
Júbilo Iwata
Winner	J1 League	1999
FC Tokyo
Winner	J.League Cup	2004
- * Club domestic league appearances and goals

Fumitake Miura (三浦 文丈, Miura Fumitake; born August 12, 1970) is a Japanese professional football manager and former footballer who is the manager of J2 League club Júbilo Iwata.

== Playing career ==
Miura was born in Shizuoka on August 12, 1970. After graduating from the University of Tsukuba, he joined Yokohama Marinos in 1993. He played many matches as an offensive midfielder or as a forward from his first season with the club. The club won the 1995 J1 League. However, his opportunity to play decreased in 1998 and he moved to Kyoto Purple Sanga in 1999. In October 1999, he moved to Júbilo Iwata and the club won the 1999 J1 League. In 2001, he moved to FC Tokyo. He played many matches as a defensive midfielder. The club won the 2004 J.League Cup, which was the first major title in the club's history. His opportunity to play decreased in 2005 and he retired at the end of the 2006 season.

== Coaching career ==
After retirement, Miura started his coaching career at FC Tokyo in 2007. From 2009, he coached at Yokohama F. Marinos (2009–12), Albirex Niigata (2013–14) and Avispa Fukuoka (2015). In 2016, he became the manager of J3 League club AC Nagano Parceiro. He finished in 3rd place in the 2016 season. In 2017, he moved to J1 League club Albirex Niigata. Although he managed in 10 games, the club won only one game. He was sacked in May 2017 when the club was in 17th place in the league. In 2018, he signed with J2 League club Fagiano Okayama and served as assistant coach under manager Tetsu Nagasawa. In 2019, he moved to J3 club SC Sagamihara and became a manager.

== Club statistics ==
Club performance			League		Cup		League Cup		Total	
Season	Club	League	Apps	Goals	Apps	Goals	Apps	Goals	Apps	Goals
Japan			League		Emperor's Cup		League Cup		Total	
1993	Yokohama Marinos	J1 League	24	5	3	2	4	0	31	7
1994	Yokohama Marinos	J1 League	38	8	4	0	3	0	45	8
1995	Yokohama Marinos	J1 League	16	3	2	1	-		18	4
1996	Yokohama Marinos	J1 League	23	2	1	0	13	3	37	5
1997	Yokohama Marinos	J1 League	27	3	1	0	6	1	34	4
1998	Yokohama Marinos	J1 League	18	5	1	0	4	0	23	5
1999	Kyoto Purple Sanga	J1 League	23	4	0	0	3	0	26	4
1999	Júbilo Iwata	J1 League	5	1	3	0	0	0	8	1
2000	Júbilo Iwata	J1 League	21	0	2	0	2	0	25	0
2001	FC Tokyo	J1 League	27	3	1	0	1	1	29	4
2002	FC Tokyo	J1 League	2	0	1	0	0	0	3	0
2003	FC Tokyo	J1 League	26	1	2	0	4	0	32	1
2004	FC Tokyo	J1 League	22	2	2	0	7	0	31	2
2005	FC Tokyo	J1 League	14	0	1	0	4	0	19	0
2006	FC Tokyo	J1 League	9	0	0	0	0	0	9	0
Career total			295	37	24	3	51	5	370	45

== Managerial statistics ==
As of 30 April 2026

Team	From	To	Record				
Team	From	To	G	W	D	L	Win %
AC Nagano Parceiro	2016	2016	33	17	7	9	51.52
Albirex Niigata	2017	2017	13	1	3	9	7.69
SC Sagamihara	2019	2021	83	28	26	29	33.73
Matsumoto Yamaga	2022	2022	1	0	1	0	0.00
Yokohama FC	2025	2025	18	5	4	9	27.78
Júbilo Iwata	2026	Present	2	1	1	0	50.00
Total			150	52	42	56	34.67
