= Masamitsu Kobayashi =

Japanese footballer

Masamitsu Kobayashi 小林 成光
Personal information
- Full name: Masamitsu Kobayashi
- Date of birth: April 13, 1978 (age 48)
- Place of birth: Sano, Tochigi, Japan
- Height: 1.74 m (5 ft 8 1/2 in)
- Position: Midfielder

Youth career
- 1994–1996: Sano Nihon University High School

Senior career*
Years	Team	Apps	(Gls)
1997–2005	FC Tokyo	135	(22)
2006	Sagan Tosu	11	(0)
2007–2008	Tochigi SC	50	(9)
Total		196	(31)
Medal record
FC Tokyo
Winner	J.League Cup	2004
- * Club domestic league appearances and goals

Masamitsu Kobayashi (小林 成光, Kobayashi Masamitsu; born April 13, 1978) is a former Japanese football player.

== Playing career ==
Kobayashi was born in Sano on April 13, 1978. After graduating from high school, he joined the Japan Football League club Tokyo Gas (later FC Tokyo) in 1997. During the first season, he played in all matches and was selected for the Best Young Player award. The club was promoted to the J2 League in 1999 and the J1 League in 2000. He played often as left midfielder for a long time. After he was in a motorcycle and broke his right leg in April 2002, he did not play as much. In 2006, he moved to the J2 club Sagan Tosu. In 2007, he moved to his local club Tochigi SC in the Japan Football League. He played often over two seasons and the club was promoted to J2 in 2009. However, he retired at the end of the 2008 season without playing in the J2 league.

== Career statistics ==
Appearances and goals by club, season and competition
Club	Season	League			Emperor's Cup		J.League Cup		Total	
Club	Season	Division	Apps	Goals	Apps	Goals	Apps	Goals	Apps	Goals
Tokyo Gas	1997	Football League	30	7	4	1	-		34	8
Tokyo Gas	1998	Football League	28	7	0	0	-		28	7
FC Tokyo	1999	J2 League	20	2	0	0	7	2	27	4
FC Tokyo	2000	J1 League	27	2	1	0	2	0	30	2
FC Tokyo	2001	J1 League	20	1	1	0	3	2	24	3
FC Tokyo	2002	J1 League	6	3	0	0	0	0	6	3
FC Tokyo	2003	J1 League	0	0	0	0	0	0	0	0
FC Tokyo	2004	J1 League	1	0	0	0	2	0	3	0
FC Tokyo	2005	J1 League	3	0	0	0	2	0	5	0
Sagan Tosu	2006	J2 League	11	0	0	0	-		11	0
Tochigi SC	2007	Football League	30	6	2	0	-		32	6
Tochigi SC	2008	Football League	20	3	1	0	-		21	3
Career total			196	31	9	1	16	4	221	36
