= Oh Jang-eun =

South Korean footballer

Oh Jang-Eun 오장은
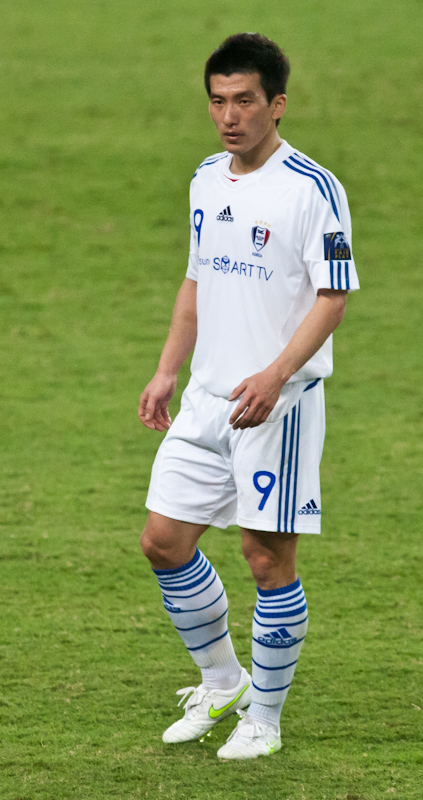

Personal information
- Date of birth: 24 July 1985 (age 41)
- Place of birth: Jeju, Jeju, South Korea
- Height: 1.75 m (5 ft 9 in)
- Position: Defensive midfielder

Youth career
- 2001–2002: FC Tokyo Youth

Senior career*
| Years | Team | Apps | (Gls) |
| 2002–2004 | FC Tokyo | 13 | (0) |
| 2005–2006 | Daegu FC | 40 | (9) |
| 2007–2010 | Ulsan Hyundai | 93 | (7) |
| 2011–2016 | Suwon Bluewings | 107 | (7) |
| 2017 | Seongnam FC | 3 | (0) |
| 2018 | Daejeon Citizen | 6 | (0) |

International career^{‡}
| 2004–2005 | South Korea U-20 | 19 | (2) |
| 2006–2008 | South Korea U-23 | 19 | (0) |
| 2006–2010 | South Korea | 14 | (0) |
- * Club domestic league appearances and goals as of 1 January 2019 ‡ National team caps and goals as of 14 February 2013

- Oh Jang-eun
- Hangul: 오장은
- Hanja: 吳章銀
- RR: O Jangeun
- MR: O Changŭn

Oh Jang-Eun (Korean: 오장은; born 24 July 1985) is a football player from South Korea. He was selected to play for Asian Cup 2007, replacing Kim Nam-Il after his injury.

== Club career ==
In 2002, Oh Jang-Eun debuted for Japanese J1 League side FC Tokyo, and set the record for the youngest player to play in the J1 League. Unusually for a Korean, he spent time in the junior ranks of FC Tokyo, rather than having a youth career with a Korean University side. He moved to South Korean K-League side Daegu FC, where he would spend two seasons. He then moved to Ulsan Hyundai Horang-i in 2007, and contributed to the club's win in the 2007 K-League Cup. He made a professional career first hat-trick in an away match against Jeonbuk Hyundai Motors on 23 September 2006.

On 1 February 2011, Oh Jang-Eun signed for Suwon Samsung Bluewings.

== International career ==
Oh has been a member of the national side, both at junior and senior level. He played in the U-20 side in the 2005 FIFA World Youth Championship. A part-timer in the senior side since making his senior debut against Ghana in 2006, the most recent of his 14 caps was against Japan, during the 2010 East Asian Football Championship.

== Club statistics ==
As of 6 November 2011

| Club performance | | | League | | Cup | | League Cup | | Continental | | Total | |
| Season | Club | League | Apps | Goals | Apps | Goals | Apps | Goals | Apps | Goals | Apps | Goals |
| Japan | | | League | | Emperor's Cup | | League Cup | | Asia | | Total | |
|---|---|---|---|---|---|---|---|---|---|---|---|---|
| 2002 | FC Tokyo | J1 League | 2 | 0 | 0 | 0 | 1 | 0 | - | | 3 | 0 |
| 2003 | FC Tokyo | J1 League | 4 | 0 | 1 | 0 | 3 | 0 | - | | 8 | 0 |
| 2004 | FC Tokyo | J1 League | 7 | 0 | 0 | 0 | 4 | 0 | - | | 11 | 0 |
| South Korea | | | League | | KFA Cup | | League Cup | | Asia | | Total | |
| 2005 | Daegu FC | K League 1 | 16 | 3 | 1 | 1 | 7 | 0 | - | | 24 | 4 |
| 2006 | Daegu FC | K League 1 | 24 | 6 | 2 | 0 | 8 | 0 | - | | 34 | 6 |
| 2007 | Ulsan Hyundai | K League 1 | 17 | 0 | 3 | 1 | 7 | 0 | - | | 27 | 1 |
| 2008 | Ulsan Hyundai | K League 1 | 24 | 2 | 3 | 1 | 9 | 0 | - | | 36 | 3 |
| 2009 | Ulsan Hyundai | K League 1 | 24 | 4 | 0 | 0 | 4 | 0 | 4 | 2 | 32 | 6 |
| 2010 | Ulsan Hyundai | K League 1 | 28 | 1 | 2 | 1 | 5 | 1 | - | | 35 | 3 |
| 2011 | Suwon Bluewings | K League 1 | 30 | 4 | 4 | 1 | 0 | 0 | 9 | 2 | 43 | 7 |
| 2012 | Suwon Bluewings | K League 1 | 26 | 1 | 1 | 0 | 0 | 0 | - | | 27 | 1 |
| Total | Japan | | 13 | 0 | 1 | 0 | 8 | 0 | - | | 22 | 0 |
| Total | South Korea | | 189 | 21 | 15 | 5 | 40 | 1 | 13 | 4 | 257 | 31 |
| Career total | | | 202 | 21 | 16 | 5 | 48 | 1 | 13 | 4 | 279 | 31 |

== National team statistics ==
Korea Republic national team
| Year | Apps | Goals |
|---|---|---|
| 2006 | 1 | 0 |
| 2007 | 6 | 0 |
| 2008 | 3 | 0 |
| 2009 | 1 | 0 |
| 2010 | 3 | 0 |
| Total | 14 | 0 |

== Honours ==
=== Club ===
FC Tokyo

- J.League Cup (1): 2004

Ulsan Hyundai Horang-i

- K-League Cup (1): 2007
