= Kazuya Maeda =

Kazuya Maeda can refer to:

- Kazuya Maeda (footballer, born 1982) (前田 和哉) - Japanese footballer
- Kazuya Maeda (footballer, born 1984) (前田 和也) - Japanese footballer
