= Tokyo Derby =

Tokyo Derby may refer to:

- Tokyo Derby (horse race)
- Tokyo derby (football)
