= Kazuya Maeda (footballer, born 1984) =

Japanese footballer

Kazuya Maeda 前田 和也
Personal information
- Full name: Kazuya Maeda
- Date of birth: January 8, 1984 (age 42)
- Place of birth: Sano, Tochigi, Japan
- Height: 1.81 m (5 ft 11 1/2 in)
- Position: Defender

Youth career
- 1999–2001: Sano Nihon University High School

Senior career*
Years	Team	Apps	(Gls)
2002–2006	FC Tokyo	4	(0)
2003	→Sagawa Printing (loan)	8	(1)
2006–2007	Montedio Yamagata	13	(0)
2008–2013	Tochigi Uva FC		
Total		25+	(1+)
Medal record
FC Tokyo
Winner	J.League Cup	2004
- * Club domestic league appearances and goals

Kazuya Maeda (前田 和也, Maeda Kazuya; born January 8, 1984) is a former Japanese football player.

== Playing career ==
Maeda was born in Sano on January 8, 1984. After graduating from high school, he joined J1 League club FC Tokyo in 2002. He debuted in April and played several matches as defensive midfielder and right side back. However he could not play at all in the match from summer 2002. In October 2003, he moved to Japan Football League club Sagawa Printing and played many matches. In 2004, he returned to FC Tokyo. Although he played several matches as right side back, he could not play many matches until 2006. In June 2006, he moved to J2 League club Montedio Yamagata. Although he played as right and left side back, he could not play many matches. In 2008, he moved to his local club Hitachi Tochigi Uva (later Tochigi Uva FC) in Regional Leagues. He became a regular player and the club was promoted to JFL from 2010. His opportunity to play decreased in 2012 and he retired end of 2013 season.

== Career statistics ==
Appearances and goals by club, season and competition
Club	Season	League			Emperor's Cup		J.League Cup		Total	
Club	Season	Division	Apps	Goals	Apps	Goals	Apps	Goals	Apps	Goals
FC Tokyo	2002	J1 League	1	0	0	0	3	0	4	0
FC Tokyo	2003	J1 League	0	0	0	0	0	0	0	0
Sagawa Printing	2003	Football League	8	1	-		-		8	1
FC Tokyo	2004	J1 League	1	0	1	0	2	0	4	0
FC Tokyo	2005	J1 League	2	0	0	0	0	0	2	0
FC Tokyo	2006	J1 League	0	0	0	0	0	0	0	0
Montedio Yamagata	2006	J2 League	9	0	1	0	-		10	0
Montedio Yamagata	2007	J2 League	4	0	0	0	-		4	0
Hitachi Tochigi Uva	2008	Regional Leagues								
Hitachi Tochigi Uva	2009	Regional Leagues								
Tochigi Uva FC	2010	Football League	34	3	1	0	-		35	3
Tochigi Uva FC	2011	Football League	30	0	2	0	-		32	0
Tochigi Uva FC	2012	Football League	17	1	-		-		17	1
Tochigi Uva FC	2013	Football League	1	1	0	0	-		1	1
Career total			107	6	8	1	5	0	120	7
