= 2006 FC Tokyo season =

FC Tokyo
2006 season
- Manager: Gallo; Hisao Kuramata
- Stadium: Ajinomoto Stadium
- J.League 1: 13th
- Emperor's Cup: 5th Round
- J.League Cup: GL-A 4th
- Top goalscorer: Lucas (18)
- Average home league attendance: 24,096
Home colours	Away colours	Third colours

2006 FC Tokyo season

== Competitions ==
Competitions	Position
J.League 1	13th / 18 clubs
Emperor's Cup	5th round
J.League Cup	GL-A 4th / 4 clubs

== Domestic results ==
=== J.League 1 ===
Match	Date	Venue	Opponents	Score
1	2006..			-
2	2006..			-
3	2006..			-
4	2006..			-
5	2006..			-
6	2006..			-
7	2006..			-
8	2006..			-
9	2006..			-
10	2006..			-
11	2006..			-
12	2006..			-
13	2006..			-
14	2006..			-
15	2006..			-
16	2006..			-
17	2006..			-
18	2006..			-
19	2006..			-
20	2006..			-
21	2006..			-
22	2006..			-
23	2006..			-
24	2006..			-
25	2006..			-
26	2006..			-
27	2006..			-
28	2006..			-
29	2006..			-
30	2006..			-
31	2006..			-
32	2006..			-
33	2006..			-
34	2006..			-

=== Emperor's Cup ===
Match	Date	Venue	Opponents	Score
4th round	2006..			-
5th round	2006..			-

=== J.League Cup ===
Match	Date	Venue	Opponents	Score
GL-A-1	2006..			-
GL-A-2	2006..			-
GL-A-3	2006..			-
GL-A-4	2006..			-
GL-A-5	2006..			-
GL-A-6	2006..			-

== Player statistics ==
No.	Pos.	Player	D.o.B. (Age)	Height / Weight	J.League 1		Emperor's Cup		J.League Cup		Total	
No.	Pos.	Player	D.o.B. (Age)	Height / Weight	Apps	Goals	Apps	Goals	Apps	Goals	Apps	Goals
1	GK	Yoichi Doi	July 25, 1973 (aged 32)	cm / kg	32	0						
2	DF	Teruyuki Moniwa	September 8, 1981 (aged 24)	cm / kg	24	0						
3	DF	Jean	September 24, 1977 (aged 28)	cm / kg	25	3						
5	DF	Tatsuya Masushima	April 22, 1985 (aged 20)	cm / kg	14	1						
6	DF	Yasuyuki Konno	January 25, 1983 (aged 23)	cm / kg	28	5						
7	MF	Satoru Asari	June 10, 1974 (aged 31)	cm / kg	7	0						
8	DF	Ryuji Fujiyama	June 9, 1973 (aged 32)	cm / kg	17	1						
9	FW	Lucas Severino	January 3, 1979 (aged 27)	cm / kg	31	18						
10	MF	Fumitake Miura	August 12, 1970 (aged 35)	cm / kg	9	0						
11	FW	Yoshiro Abe	July 5, 1980 (aged 25)	cm / kg	14	2						
13	FW	Mitsuhiro Toda	September 10, 1977 (aged 28)	cm / kg	13	1						
14	MF	Yuta Baba	January 22, 1984 (aged 22)	cm / kg	22	2						
15	MF	Norio Suzuki	February 14, 1984 (aged 22)	cm / kg	21	1						
16	MF	Masashi Miyazawa	April 24, 1978 (aged 27)	cm / kg	20	1						
17	DF	Jo Kanazawa	July 9, 1976 (aged 29)	cm / kg	0	0						
18	MF	Naohiro Ishikawa	May 12, 1981 (aged 24)	cm / kg	20	5						
19	DF	Masahiko Inoha	August 28, 1985 (aged 20)	cm / kg	28	1						
20	FW	Nobuo Kawaguchi	April 10, 1975 (aged 30)	cm / kg	24	3						
21	FW	Sasa Salcedo	September 6, 1981 (aged 24)	cm / kg	6	1						
22	GK	Hitoshi Shiota	May 28, 1981 (aged 24)	cm / kg	2	0						
23	MF	Yōhei Kajiyama	September 24, 1985 (aged 20)	cm / kg	30	3						
24	FW	Shingo Akamine	December 8, 1983 (aged 22)	cm / kg	16	3						
25	DF	Yuhei Tokunaga	September 25, 1983 (aged 22)	cm / kg	32	1						
26	MF	Reiichi Ikegami	July 12, 1983 (aged 22)	cm / kg	0	0						
27	MF	Ryoichi Kurisawa	September 5, 1982 (aged 23)	cm / kg	13	1						
29	DF	Kazuya Maeda	January 8, 1984 (aged 22)	cm / kg	0	0						
29	FW	Washington	July 17, 1978 (aged 27)	cm / kg	2	0						
30	DF	Naoto Matsuo	September 10, 1979 (aged 26)	cm / kg	0	0						
31	GK	Taishi Endo	March 31, 1980 (aged 25)	cm / kg	0	0						
33	FW	Ryuki Kozawa	February 6, 1988 (aged 18)	cm / kg	3	0						
34	GK	Takahiro Shibasaki	May 23, 1982 (aged 23)	cm / kg	0	0						
35	FW	Rychely	August 6, 1987 (aged 18)	cm / kg	9	1						
38	DF	Sota Nakazawa	October 26, 1982 (aged 23)	cm / kg	2	0						
39	FW	Sōta Hirayama	June 6, 1985 (aged 20)	cm / kg	7	2						

== Other pages ==
- (in Japanese) J. League official site
