= 2005 FC Tokyo season =

FC Tokyo
2005 season
- Manager: Hiromi Hara
- Stadium: Ajinomoto Stadium
- J.League 1: 10th
- Emperor's Cup: 5th Round
- J.League Cup: GL-C 4th
- Top goalscorer: Yasuyuki Konno (7); Lucas (7)
- Average home league attendance: 27,101
| Home colours | Away colours |

During the 2005 season, FC Tokyo competed in the J.League 1, in which they finished 10th.

== Competitions ==
| Competitions | Position |
|---|---|
| J.League 1 | 10th / 18 clubs |
| Emperor's Cup | 5th round |
| J.League Cup | GL-C 4th / 4 clubs |

== Domestic results ==
=== J.League 1 ===
| Match | Date | Venue | Opponents | Score |
|---|---|---|---|---|
| 1 | 2005.. | | | - |
| 2 | 2005.. | | | - |
| 3 | 2005.. | | | - |
| 4 | 2005.. | | | - |
| 5 | 2005.. | | | - |
| 6 | 2005.. | | | - |
| 7 | 2005.. | | | - |
| 8 | 2005.. | | | - |
| 9 | 2005.. | | | - |
| 10 | 2005.. | | | - |
| 11 | 2005.. | | | - |
| 12 | 2005.. | | | - |
| 13 | 2005.. | | | - |
| 14 | 2005.. | | | - |
| 15 | 2005.. | | | - |
| 16 | 2005.. | | | - |
| 17 | 2005.. | | | - |
| 18 | 2005.. | | | - |
| 19 | 2005.. | | | - |
| 20 | 2005.. | | | - |
| 21 | 2005.. | | | - |
| 22 | 2005.. | | | - |
| 23 | 2005.. | | | - |
| 24 | 2005.. | | | - |
| 25 | 2005.. | | | - |
| 26 | 2005.. | | | - |
| 27 | 2005.. | | | - |
| 28 | 2005.. | | | - |
| 29 | 2005.. | | | - |
| 30 | 2005.. | | | - |
| 31 | 2005.. | | | - |
| 32 | 2005.. | | | - |
| 33 | 2005.. | | | - |
| 34 | 2005.. | | | - |

=== Emperor's Cup ===
| Match | Date | Venue | Opponents | Score |
|---|---|---|---|---|
| 4th round | 2005.. | | | - |
| 5th round | 2005.. | | | - |

=== J.League Cup ===
| Match | Date | Venue | Opponents | Score |
|---|---|---|---|---|
| GL-C-1 | 2005.. | | | - |
| GL-C-2 | 2005.. | | | - |
| GL-C-3 | 2005.. | | | - |
| GL-C-4 | 2005.. | | | - |
| GL-C-5 | 2005.. | | | - |
| GL-C-6 | 2005.. | | | - |

== Player statistics ==
| No. | Pos. | Player | D.o.B. (Age) | Height / Weight | J.League 1 | | Emperor's Cup | | J.League Cup | | Total | |
| No. | Pos. | Player | D.o.B. (Age) | Height / Weight | Apps | Goals | Apps | Goals | Apps | Goals | Apps | Goals |
|---|---|---|---|---|---|---|---|---|---|---|---|---|
| 1 | GK | Yoichi Doi | July 25, 1973 (aged 31) | cm / kg | 34 | 0 | | | | | | |
| 2 | DF | Teruyuki Moniwa | September 8, 1981 (aged 23) | cm / kg | 32 | 0 | | | | | | |
| 3 | DF | Jean | September 24, 1977 (aged 27) | cm / kg | 34 | 0 | | | | | | |
| 4 | DF | Taisei Fujita | January 31, 1982 (aged 23) | cm / kg | 0 | 0 | | | | | | |
| 5 | DF | Tatsuya Masushima | April 22, 1985 (aged 19) | cm / kg | 4 | 0 | | | | | | |
| 6 | DF | Yasuyuki Konno | January 25, 1983 (aged 22) | cm / kg | 34 | 7 | | | | | | |
| 7 | MF | Satoru Asari | June 10, 1974 (aged 30) | cm / kg | 9 | 0 | | | | | | |
| 8 | DF | Ryuji Fujiyama | June 9, 1973 (aged 31) | cm / kg | 15 | 0 | | | | | | |
| 9 | FW | Lucas Severino | January 3, 1979 (aged 26) | cm / kg | 30 | 7 | | | | | | |
| 10 | MF | Fumitake Miura | August 12, 1970 (aged 34) | cm / kg | 14 | 0 | | | | | | |
| 11 | FW | Yoshiro Abe | July 5, 1980 (aged 24) | cm / kg | 13 | 3 | | | | | | |
| 13 | FW | Mitsuhiro Toda | September 10, 1977 (aged 27) | cm / kg | 26 | 3 | | | | | | |
| 14 | MF | Yuta Baba | January 22, 1984 (aged 21) | cm / kg | 20 | 4 | | | | | | |
| 15 | MF | Norio Suzuki | February 14, 1984 (aged 21) | cm / kg | 24 | 3 | | | | | | |
| 16 | MF | Masashi Miyazawa | April 24, 1978 (aged 26) | cm / kg | 15 | 2 | | | | | | |
| 17 | DF | Jo Kanazawa | July 9, 1976 (aged 28) | cm / kg | 22 | 0 | | | | | | |
| 18 | MF | Naohiro Ishikawa | May 12, 1981 (aged 23) | cm / kg | 23 | 3 | | | | | | |
| 19 | MF | Danilo | October 15, 1981 (aged 23) | cm / kg | 5 | 0 | | | | | | |
| 20 | DF | Akira Kaji | January 13, 1980 (aged 25) | cm / kg | 25 | 0 | | | | | | |
| 21 | GK | Taishi Endo | March 31, 1980 (aged 24) | cm / kg | 0 | 0 | | | | | | |
| 22 | GK | Hitoshi Shiota | May 28, 1981 (aged 23) | cm / kg | 0 | 0 | | | | | | |
| 23 | MF | Yōhei Kajiyama | September 24, 1985 (aged 19) | cm / kg | 26 | 2 | | | | | | |
| 24 | MF | Masamitsu Kobayashi | April 13, 1978 (aged 26) | cm / kg | 3 | 0 | | | | | | |
| 25 | DF | Shinya Sakoi | May 8, 1977 (aged 27) | cm / kg | 4 | 0 | | | | | | |
| 26 | DF | Ryo Nakamura | August 13, 1981 (aged 23) | cm / kg | 0 | 0 | | | | | | |
| 27 | MF | Ryoichi Kurisawa | September 5, 1982 (aged 22) | cm / kg | 34 | 3 | | | | | | |
| 28 | MF | Kenji Suzuki | September 3, 1986 (aged 18) | cm / kg | 0 | 0 | | | | | | |
| 29 | DF | Kazuya Maeda | January 8, 1984 (aged 21) | cm / kg | 2 | 0 | | | | | | |
| 30 | DF | Hiroyuki Omata | September 1, 1983 (aged 21) | cm / kg | 0 | 0 | | | | | | |
| 31 | GK | Kenichi Kondo | April 2, 1983 (aged 21) | cm / kg | 0 | 0 | | | | | | |
| 32 | FW | Yusuke Kondo | December 5, 1984 (aged 20) | cm / kg | 11 | 1 | | | | | | |
| 34 | FW | Shingo Akamine | December 8, 1983 (aged 21) | cm / kg | 0 | 0 | | | | | | |
| 35 | FW | Rychely | August 6, 1987 (aged 17) | cm / kg | 0 | 0 | | | | | | |
| 38 | FW | Sasa Salcedo | September 6, 1981 (aged 23) | cm / kg | 12 | 5 | | | | | | |
| 40 | GK | Koichiro Morita | October 28, 1984 (aged 20) | cm / kg | 0 | 0 | | | | | | |

== Other pages ==
- (in Japanese) J. League official site
