= 2004 Emperor's Cup final =

2004 Emperor's Cup Final
Tokyo Verdy	Júbilo Iwata
2	1
- Date: January 1, 2005
- Venue: National Stadium, Tokyo

2004 Emperor's Cup Final was the 84th final of the Emperor's Cup competition. The final was played at National Stadium in Tokyo on January 1, 2005. Tokyo Verdy won the championship 2-1 over Júbilo Iwata.

== Match details ==
January 1, 2005

Tokyo Verdy	2–1	Júbilo Iwata
Kazunori Iio 35'; Kazuki Hiramoto 53'		Norihiro Nishi 77'

National Stadium

Tokyo Verdy
GK	21	(Japan) Yoshinari Takagi
DF	31	(South Korea) Lee Gang-jin
DF	5	(Japan) Atsushi Yoneyama
DF	14	(Japan) Seitaro Tomisawa
MF	4	(Japan) Kentaro Hayashi
MF	2	(Japan) Takuya Yamada
MF	15	(Japan) Takahito Soma
MF	8	(Japan) Daigo Kobayashi
MF	32	(Japan) Yoshiyuki Kobayashi
FW	11	(Japan) Kazuki Hiramoto
FW	20	(Japan) Kazunori Iio	(substituted off) 46'
Substitutes:
GK	1	(Japan) Hiroki Mizuhara
DF	13	(Japan) Masayuki Yanagisawa	(substituted on) 46'
MF	22	(Japan) Takashi Hirano
MF	33	(Japan) Jun Tamano
FW	25	(Japan) Takayuki Morimoto
Manager:
(Argentina) Ardiles

Júbilo Iwata
GK	1	(Japan) Yohei Sato
DF	2	(Japan) Hideto Suzuki
DF	5	(Japan) Makoto Tanaka
DF	27	(Japan) Naoya Kikuchi	(substituted off) 65'
MF	4	(Japan) Takahiro Kawamura
MF	23	(Japan) Takashi Fukunishi
MF	6	(Japan) Toshihiro Hattori
MF	11	(Japan) Norihiro Nishi
MF	7	(Japan) Hiroshi Nanami
FW	8	(Brazil) Gral	(substituted off) 72'
FW	18	(Japan) Ryoichi Maeda	(substituted off) 46'
Substitutes:
GK	12	(Japan) Fumiya Iwamaru
DF	14	(Japan) Takahiro Yamanishi
MF	10	(Japan) Toshiya Fujita	(substituted on) 72'
MF	13	(Japan) Nobuo Kawaguchi	(substituted on) 65'
FW	9	(Japan) Masashi Nakayama	(substituted on) 46'
Manager:
(Japan) Masakuni Yamamoto

== See also ==
- 2004 Emperor's Cup
