= Pedro Severino (footballer) =

Brazilian footballer

Personal information
- Full name: Pedro Henrique Severino
- Date of birth: 30 November 2005 (age 20)
- Place of birth: Ribeirão Preto, Brazil
- Position: Forward

Youth career
- 2021: I9 International
- 2022–2025: Botafogo-SP
- 2025: → Red Bull Bragantino (loan)

Senior career*
Years	Team	Apps	(Gls)
2023–2025	Botafogo-SP	3	(0)
2025	→ Red Bull Bragantino (loan)	0	(0)
- * Club domestic league appearances and goals as of 10:55, 9 February 2026 (UTC)

Pedro Henrique Severino (born 30 November 2005) is a Brazilian former professional footballer who played as a forward.

== Career ==
Born in Ribeirão Preto, Pedro Severino played for the youth club I9 International in 2021, and the following year, he joined Botafogo-SP. In 2023, he was promoted to the professional team, making his professional debut in a match against Londrina.

In the 2024 season, he continued to have opportunities among the professionals of Botafogo-SP, being the team's great highlight in the Copa Paulista in the second half of the year, scoring four goals in the competition, two of which were in the match against rival Comercial. Severino's good performance resulted in a contract renewal until 2027.

In January 2025, he played in the Copa São Paulo de Futebol Jr. alongside his brother, João Victor. He gained prominence and was signed on loan by Red Bull Bragantino at the end of the competition.

== Personal life ==
Pedro Severino is the eldest son of former international striker Lucas Severino. His younger brother João Victor is also a professional athlete, playing for Botafogo-SP.

On 4 March 2025, at around 5:30 am, while being taken to the Red Bull Bragantino youth academy in the city of Atibaia, he suffered an accident on the Anhanguera Highway, where the car in which Severino was traveling collided with the back of a truck. The driver ended up falling asleep at the wheel. Another Red Bull Bragantino athlete, Pedro Castro, was also in the car but suffered minor injuries, and the driver was not injured.

Severino arrived at the Waldemar Tebaldi Municipal Hospital in the city of Americana in a very serious condition, with a confirmed head injury. A protocol to allege Severino's brain death was initiated, but due to a cough in the following 48 hours, it was interrupted.

Transferred to a hospital in Ribeirão Preto, Severino remained in the ICU for another 14 days. On 24 March, he was transferred to a regular room and his clinical condition was considered stable. On 10 June, Severino was discharged from the hospital and returned home where he will continue treatment for his recovery. It was revealed by doctor surgeon Gil Teixeira that Severino had more than 50% of his skull reconstructed via 3D printing.

On 6 September, Severino was honored by Botafogo-SP, being responsible for the kick-off of a Série B match against Athletico Paranaense.
