= 2011 Oita Trinita season =

Oita Trinita
2011 season
- Manager: Kazuaki Tasaka
- Stadium: Oita Bank Dome
- J2 League: 12 th

2011 Oita Trinita season.

== J2 League ==
Match	Date	Team	Score	Team	Venue	Attendance
1	2011.03.06	FC Gifu	0-1	Oita Trinita	Gifu Nagaragawa Stadium	6,621
8	2011.04.24	Oita Trinita	1-2	Thespa Kusatsu	Oita Bank Dome	9,537
9	2011.04.30	Fagiano Okayama	0-0	Oita Trinita	Kanko Stadium	8,384
10	2011.05.04	Oita Trinita	2-2	Tokushima Vortis	Oita Bank Dome	8,829
11	2011.05.08	Sagan Tosu	2-1	Oita Trinita	Best Amenity Stadium	8,614
12	2011.05.15	Oita Trinita	1-0	Tochigi SC	Oita Bank Dome	7,133
13	2011.05.22	Oita Trinita	0-0	Tokyo Verdy	Oita Bank Dome	7,817
14	2011.05.29	JEF United Chiba	3-2	Oita Trinita	Fukuda Denshi Arena	7,216
15	2011.06.04	Oita Trinita	0-1	Consadole Sapporo	Oita Bank Dome	7,788
16	2011.06.12	Kyoto Sanga FC	2-0	Oita Trinita	Kyoto Nishikyogoku Athletic Stadium	7,045
17	2011.06.19	Oita Trinita	2-2	Roasso Kumamoto	Oita Bank Dome	6,637
18	2011.06.26	Oita Trinita	2-1	Gainare Tottori	Oita Bank Dome	5,794
2	2011.06.29	Oita Trinita	1-0	Yokohama FC	Oita Bank Dome	5,384
19	2011.07.02	Giravanz Kitakyushu	3-0	Oita Trinita	Honjo Stadium	6,670
20	2011.07.09	Oita Trinita	0-0	FC Tokyo	Oita Bank Dome	27,519
21	2011.07.17	Yokohama FC	2-2	Oita Trinita	NHK Spring Mitsuzawa Football Stadium	4,770
22	2011.07.23	Oita Trinita	3-1	Shonan Bellmare	Oita Bank Dome	7,466
23	2011.07.31	Tokyo Verdy	1-2	Oita Trinita	Ajinomoto Stadium	3,273
3	2011.08.07	Shonan Bellmare	2-2	Oita Trinita	Hiratsuka Stadium	6,850
24	2011.08.13	Roasso Kumamoto	2-1	Oita Trinita	Kumamoto Athletics Stadium	8,935
25	2011.08.21	Oita Trinita	1-0	Fagiano Okayama	Oita Bank Dome	10,806
26	2011.08.28	Tokushima Vortis	1-2	Oita Trinita	Pocarisweat Stadium	5,429
4	2011.09.03	Kataller Toyama	1-0	Oita Trinita	Toyama Stadium	2,087
27	2011.09.11	Mito HollyHock	0-2	Oita Trinita	K's denki Stadium Mito	3,017
28	2011.09.17	Oita Trinita	0-0	Sagan Tosu	Oita Bank Dome	9,033
29	2011.09.23	Thespa Kusatsu	1-1	Oita Trinita	Shoda Shoyu Stadium Gunma	2,864
5	2011.09.28	Oita Trinita	0-0	Mito HollyHock	Oita Bank Dome	5,196
30	2011.10.01	Oita Trinita	1-2	Kataller Toyama	Oita Bank Dome	6,013
31	2011.10.15	Gainare Tottori	0-0	Oita Trinita	Tottori Bank Bird Stadium	2,837
6	2011.10.19	Oita Trinita	2-1	Ehime FC	Oita Bank Dome	4,859
32	2011.10.23	Oita Trinita	1-3	Kyoto Sanga FC	Oita Bank Dome	8,522
7	2011.10.26	FC Tokyo	1-2	Oita Trinita	Tokyo National Stadium	10,660
33	2011.10.30	Ehime FC	1-1	Oita Trinita	Ningineer Stadium	2,316
34	2011.11.06	Oita Trinita	1-1	JEF United Chiba	Oita Bank Dome	9,589
35	2011.11.12	Consadole Sapporo	2-0	Oita Trinita	Sapporo Atsubetsu Stadium	8,766
36	2011.11.20	Oita Trinita	2-1	FC Gifu	Oita Bank Dome	8,490
37	2011.11.26	Tochigi SC	2-1	Oita Trinita	Tochigi Green Stadium	4,614
38	2011.12.03	Oita Trinita	2-2	Giravanz Kitakyushu	Oita Bank Dome	10,395
