= Yuta Baba =

Japanese footballer (born 1984)

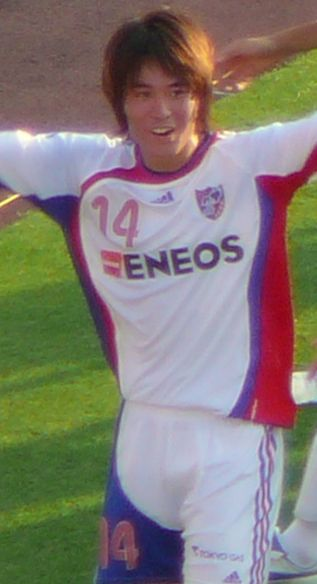

Personal information
- Full name: Yuta Baba
- Date of birth: January 22, 1984 (age 42)
- Place of birth: Itabashi, Japan
- Height: 1.76 m (5 ft 9 1/2 in)
- Position: Midfielder

Youth career
- 1999–2001: FC Tokyo

Senior career*
Years	Team	Apps	(Gls)
2002–2007	FC Tokyo	107	(11)
2008	JEF United Chiba	6	(0)
2008	Montedio Yamagata	10	(0)
2009	Tokyo Verdy	3	(0)
2011–2013	Daejeon Citizen	43	(5)
Total		169	(16)
Medal record
FC Tokyo
Winner	J.League Cup	2004
Representing Japan
AFC U-19 Championship
Silver medal – second place	2002 Qatar
- * Club domestic league appearances and goals

Yuta Baba (馬場 憂太, Baba Yūta; born January 22, 1984) is a former Japanese football player. His younger brother, Tōru, is an actor.

== Playing career ==
Baba was born in Itabashi, Tokyo on January 22, 1984. He joined J1 League club FC Tokyo from youth team in 2002. He got an opportunity to play during the first season and played many matches as offensive midfielder in 2003. In 2004, FC Tokyo won the J.League Cup, the first title in the club's history. In 2008, he moved to JEF United Chiba. Although he initially played many matches as a substitute midfielder, the club results were sluggish and che did not play much in May. In August 2008, he moved to the J2 League club Montedio Yamagata. He played many matches as a regular player and Montedio won second place in the 2008 season. Montedio was promoted to J1 for the first time in the club's history at the end of 2009, and he left the club at the end of the 2008 season. In August 2009, he joined the J2 club Tokyo Verdy. However he did not play much and left the club at the end of the 2009 season. After a year and a half without playing, he moved to South Korea and joined Daejeon Citizen. He retired at the end of the 2013 season.

== Club statistics ==
Club performance			League		Cup		League Cup		Total	
Season	Club	League	Apps	Goals	Apps	Goals	Apps	Goals	Apps	Goals
Japan			League		Emperor's Cup		J.League Cup		Total	
2002	FC Tokyo	J1 League	8	0	1	0	3	0	12	0
2003	FC Tokyo	J1 League	15	1	0	0	5	1	20	2
2004	FC Tokyo	J1 League	26	3	2	1	8	0	36	4
2005	FC Tokyo	J1 League	20	4	1	0	3	0	24	4
2006	FC Tokyo	J1 League	22	2	2	2	1	0	25	4
2007	FC Tokyo	J1 League	16	1	0	0	5	0	21	1
2008	JEF United Chiba	J1 League	6	0	0	0	1	0	7	0
2008	Montedio Yamagata	J2 League	10	0	2	0	-		12	0
2009	Tokyo Verdy	J2 League	3	0	0	0	-		3	0
Korea Republic			League		FA Cup		League Cup		Total	
2011	Daejeon Citizen	K-League	6	1	0	0	0	0	6	1
2011	Daejeon Citizen	K-League	30	4	2	1	0	0	32	5
2011	Daejeon Citizen	K League Classic	7	0	0	0	0	0	7	0
Country	Japan		126	11	8	3	26	1	160	15
Country	Korea Republic		43	5	2	1	0	0	45	6
Total			169	16	10	4	26	1	205	21
