= Amaral (footballer, born 1966) =

Brazilian footballer

Personal information
- Full name: Wagner Pereira Cardozo
- Date of birth: 16 October 1966 (age 60)
- Place of birth: Piracicaba, Brazil
- Height: 1.83 m (6 ft 0 in)
- Position: Forward

Senior career*
Years	Team	Apps	(Gls)
1987	Comercial		
1988	Capivariano		
1989–1991	Ituano		
1992	Palmeiras		
1992–2003	FC Tokyo	292	(165)
2004	Shonan Bellmare	19	(2)
2005–2007	Arte Takasaki	28	(16)
2009	FC Kariya		

Managerial career
- 2006: Arte Takasaki
- 2010: FC Kariya
- 2011: Tokyo 23 FC
- Gyosei International School (U-18)
- * Club domestic league appearances and goals

Wagner Pereira Cardozo, known as Amaral (Portuguese pronunciation: [amaˈɾaw]; born 16 October 1966 in São Paulo, Brazil) is a former Brazilian football striker who currently coaches Japanese international high-school football club in the Gyosei International School, as U-18 team.

Amaral's nickname is "King of Tokyo" and he is considered one of the greatest players in the history of FC Tokyo, which includes its amateur period, called as Tokyo Gas SC. Amaral attended 332 games in FC Tokyo/Tokyo Gas FC. In 2008, a documentary film titled King of Tokyo: O Filme was released. Supporters of Tokyo show a big flag of his face on a corner of its home stadium.

== Club statistics ==
Club performance			League		Cup		League Cup		Total	
Season	Club	League	Apps	Goals	Apps	Goals	Apps	Goals	Apps	Goals
Japan			League		Emperor's Cup		J.League Cup		Total	
1992	Tokyo Gas	Football League	16	7	-		-		16	7
1993	Tokyo Gas	Football League	17	8	-		-		17	8
1994	Tokyo Gas	Football League	30	20	3	1	-		33	21
1995	Tokyo Gas	Football League	28	16	1	0	-		29	16
1996	Tokyo Gas	Football League	25	17	3	5	-		28	22
1997	Tokyo Gas	Football League	25	18	0	0	-		25	18
1998	Tokyo Gas	Football League	24	15	3	2	-		27	17
1999	FC Tokyo	J2 League	26	15	3	2	8	2	37	19
2000	FC Tokyo	J1 League	22	13	1	0	2	0	25	13
2001	FC Tokyo	J1 League	25	17	0	0	2	0	27	17
2002	FC Tokyo	J1 League	29	15	0	0	6	1	35	16
2003	FC Tokyo	J1 League	25	4	2	0	6	3	33	7
2004	Shonan Bellmare	J2 League	19	2	2	0	-		21	2
2005	FC Horikoshi	Football League	24	15	2	3	-		26	18
2006	Arte Takasaki	Football League	4	1	0	0	-		4	1
2007	Arte Takasaki	Football League	0	0	-		-		0	0
2009	FC Kariya	Football League	9	0	1	0	-		10	0
Total			348	183	21	13	24	6	393	202
