= 2015 FC Gifu season =

FC Gifu
2015 season
- Manager: Ruy Ramos
- Stadium: Gifu Nagaragawa Stadium
- J2 League: 20th

2015 FC Gifu season.

== J2 League ==
=== League table ===
Pos	Team	Pld	W	D	L	GF	GA	GD	Pts	Promotion, qualification or relegation
19	Mito HollyHock	42	10	16	16	40	47	−7	46	
20	FC Gifu	42	12	7	23	37	71	−34	43	
21	Oita Trinita (R)	42	8	14	20	41	51	−10	38	Qualification for relegation playoffs (Note: The playoffs and direct exchange between J2 and J3 are subject to eligibility of J2-licensed teams in top 2 of 2015 J3 League.)

Source: Meiji Yasuda J2 League Standing
Rules for classification: 1) Points; 2) Goal difference; 3) Goals scored
(R) Relegated

=== Match details ===
J2 League match details
Match	Date	Team	Score	Team	Venue	Attendance
1	2015.03.08	Fagiano Okayama	3-0	FC Gifu	City Light Stadium	10,995
2	2015.03.15	FC Gifu	1-0	Kamatamare Sanuki	Gifu Nagaragawa Stadium	8,332
3	2015.03.21	Tokushima Vortis	1-0	FC Gifu	Pocarisweat Stadium	4,733
4	2015.03.29	FC Gifu	0-2	Zweigen Kanazawa	Gifu Nagaragawa Stadium	3,934
5	2015.04.01	Oita Trinita	6-2	FC Gifu	Oita Bank Dome	5,122
6	2015.04.05	FC Gifu	0-2	Cerezo Osaka	Gifu Nagaragawa Stadium	8,139
7	2015.04.11	Tokyo Verdy	4-3	FC Gifu	Ajinomoto Stadium	3,178
8	2015.04.19	FC Gifu	0-1	Tochigi SC	Gifu Nagaragawa Stadium	4,008
9	2015.04.26	Avispa Fukuoka	2-2	FC Gifu	Level5 Stadium	6,091
10	2015.04.29	FC Gifu	1-0	V-Varen Nagasaki	Gifu Nagaragawa Stadium	5,003
11	2015.05.03	Giravanz Kitakyushu	2-1	FC Gifu	Honjo Stadium	2,787
12	2015.05.06	FC Gifu	1-1	Kyoto Sanga FC	Gifu Nagaragawa Stadium	8,463
13	2015.05.10	FC Gifu	2-1	Ehime FC	Gifu Nagaragawa Stadium	3,539
14	2015.05.17	Roasso Kumamoto	1-2	FC Gifu	Kumamoto Suizenji Stadium	4,164
15	2015.05.24	FC Gifu	0-5	Omiya Ardija	Gifu Nagaragawa Stadium	6,011
16	2015.05.31	FC Gifu	1-1	Mito HollyHock	Gifu Nagaragawa Stadium	4,584
17	2015.06.06	Yokohama FC	3-2	FC Gifu	NHK Spring Mitsuzawa Football Stadium	5,432
18	2015.06.14	FC Gifu	0-1	Consadole Sapporo	Gifu Nagaragawa Stadium	7,065
19	2015.06.21	Júbilo Iwata	2-3	FC Gifu	Yamaha Stadium	10,028
20	2015.06.28	FC Gifu	1-1	Thespakusatsu Gunma	Gifu Nagaragawa Stadium	8,517
21	2015.07.04	JEF United Chiba	3-1	FC Gifu	Fukuda Denshi Arena	9,250
22	2015.07.08	FC Gifu	0-2	Tokyo Verdy	Gifu Nagaragawa Stadium	3,539
23	2015.07.12	FC Gifu	0-1	Yokohama FC	Gifu Nagaragawa Stadium	7,532
24	2015.07.18	Zweigen Kanazawa	1-1	FC Gifu	Ishikawa Athletics Stadium	4,363
25	2015.07.22	FC Gifu	2-0	Júbilo Iwata	Gifu Nagaragawa Stadium	5,008
26	2015.07.26	Omiya Ardija	5-0	FC Gifu	NACK5 Stadium Omiya	8,329
28	2015.08.08	FC Gifu	0-1	Roasso Kumamoto	Gifu Nagaragawa Stadium	7,272
29	2015.08.15	Cerezo Osaka	1-0	FC Gifu	Kincho Stadium	11,304
30	2015.08.23	Tochigi SC	0-1	FC Gifu	Tochigi Green Stadium	5,173
27	2015.08.26	Thespakusatsu Gunma	0-1	FC Gifu	Shoda Shoyu Stadium Gunma	1,824
31	2015.09.13	FC Gifu	1-0	Giravanz Kitakyushu	Gifu Nagaragawa Stadium	5,139
32	2015.09.20	FC Gifu	0-3	Oita Trinita	Gifu Nagaragawa Stadium	8,814
33	2015.09.23	Consadole Sapporo	1-2	FC Gifu	Sapporo Atsubetsu Stadium	8,761
34	2015.09.27	Mito HollyHock	0-2	FC Gifu	K's denki Stadium Mito	4,677
35	2015.10.04	FC Gifu	1-2	Tokushima Vortis	Gifu Nagaragawa Stadium	5,693
36	2015.10.10	Kyoto Sanga FC	0-0	FC Gifu	Kyoto Nishikyogoku Athletic Stadium	10,879
37	2015.10.18	V-Varen Nagasaki	2-1	FC Gifu	Nagasaki Stadium	5,325
38	2015.10.25	FC Gifu	1-0	JEF United Chiba	Gifu Nagaragawa Stadium	5,668
39	2015.11.01	Ehime FC	3-0	FC Gifu	Ningineer Stadium	5,134
40	2015.11.08	FC Gifu	0-0	Fagiano Okayama	Gifu Nagaragawa Stadium	4,200
41	2015.11.14	Kamatamare Sanuki	3-0	FC Gifu	Pikara Stadium	2,600
42	2015.11.23	FC Gifu	1-4	Avispa Fukuoka	Gifu Nagaragawa Stadium	9,296
