= Kelly (footballer, born 1975) =

Brazilian footballer

Kelly Guimarães
Personal information
- Full name: Clesly Evandro Guimarães
- Date of birth: 28 April 1975 (age 51)
- Place of birth: Barra Bonita, Brazil
- Height: 1.79 m (5 ft 10 in)
- Position: Attacking midfielder

Youth career
- 1994–1995: Bragantino

Senior career*
Years	Team	Apps	(Gls)
1995–1996	Bragantino	59	(19)
1997	Logroñés	12	(1)
1997	Flamengo	2	(0)
1998–2001	Atlético Paranaense	53	(10)
2001–2004	FC Tokyo	97	(30)
2004–2006	Cruzeiro	39	(16)
2006–2007	Al-Ain		
2007–2008	Grêmio	15	(1)
2008	Atlético Paranaense	0	(0)

Managerial career
- 2017–2019: Athletico Paranaense (assistant)
- 2017: Atlético Paranaense (interim)
- 2020: Corinthians (assistant)
- 2021: Grêmio (assistant)
- 2021–2022: Ceará (assistant)
- 2023–2024: Portuguesa (assistant)
- 2024–2025: São Bernardo (assistant)
- 2025–2026: Wellington Phoenix (assistant)
- * Club domestic league appearances and goals

Clesly Evandro Guimarães (born 28 April 1975, in Barra Bonita), commonly known as Kelly Guimarães, is a Brazilian football coach and former player who played as an attacking midfielder. He is the current assistant manager of Wellington Phoenix.

== Career statistics ==
Appearances and goals by club, season and competition
Club	Season	League			National cup (Note: Includes Copa do Brasil, Copa del Rey, Emperor's Cup, President's Cup.)		Other		Total	
Club	Season	Division	Apps	Goals	Apps	Goals	Apps	Goals	Apps	Goals
Bragantino	1994	Série A	10	0					10	0
Bragantino	1995	Série A	22	11					22	11
Bragantino	1996	Série A	21	8					21	8
Bragantino	Total		53	19					53	19
Logroñés	1996–97	La Liga	12	1	0	0	0	0	12	1
Flamengo	1997	Série A	2	0					2	0
Atlético Paranaense	1998	Série A	12	1					12	1
Atlético Paranaense	1999	Série A	20	7					20	7
Atlético Paranaense	2000	Série A	21	2					21	2
Atlético Paranaense	Total		53	10					53	10
FC Tokyo	2001	J1 League	26	9	1	0	4	2	31	11
FC Tokyo	2002	J1 League	29	8	0	0	6	1	35	9
FC Tokyo	2003	J1 League	27	9	2	1	8	0	37	10
FC Tokyo	2004	J1 League	15	4	3	1	4	1	22	6
FC Tokyo	Total		97	30	6	2	22	4	125	36
Cruzeiro	2005	Série A	39	16					39	16
Al-Ain	2005–06	UAE League								
Al-Ain	2006–07	UAE League								
Al-Ain	Total									
Grêmio	2007	Série A	15	1					15	1
Atlético Paranaense	2008	Série A								
Career total			271	77	6	2	22	4	299	83

== Honours ==
- Paraná State League: 1998, 2000, 2001
- Parana State League Cup: 1998
- J.League Cup: 2004
