= Kazunori Iio =

Japanese footballer

Kazunori Iio 飯尾 一慶
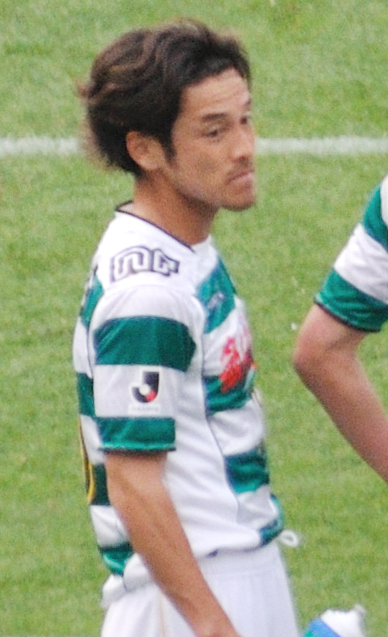

Personal information
- Full name: Kazunori Iio
- Date of birth: February 23, 1982 (age 44)
- Place of birth: Ninohe, Iwate, Japan
- Height: 1.68 m (5 ft 6 in)
- Positions: Midfielder; forward

Youth career
- 1997–1999: Verdy Kawasaki

Senior career*
Years	Team	Apps	(Gls)
1999–2013	Tokyo Verdy	276	(30)
2002	→Kawasaki Frontale (loan)	7	(2)
2005	→Kawasaki Frontale (loan)	5	(0)
2006	→Avispa Fukuoka (loan)	17	(4)
2014–2015	Yokohama FC	10	(1)
Total		315	(37)

International career
2001	Japan U-20	3	(0)
Medal record
Tokyo Verdy
Winner	Emperor's Cup	2004
Representing Japan
AFC U-19 Championship
Silver medal – second place	2000 Iran
- * Club domestic league appearances and goals

Kazunori Iio (飯尾 一慶, Iio Kazunori; born February 23, 1982) is a former Japanese football player.

== Club career ==
Iio was born in Ninohe on February 23, 1982. He joined Verdy Kawasaki (later Tokyo Verdy) from youth team in 1999. In 2000, he played many matches as forward.

Iio made a name for himself when he scored Verdy's first goal in the final of the 2004 Emperor's Cup. The match ended in a 2-1 victory for Verdy over Júbilo Iwata. Kazuki Hiramoto netted Verdy's second, whilst Norihiro Nishi provided Júbilo's consolation. It was the first time Verdy had won the Emperor's Cup since 1996.

Upon Iio's transfer to Avispa Fukuoka in 2006, he received a relatively high squad number of 34. Despite this, he quickly established himself as a first-choice striker. During the 2006 season, Avispa would usually play with two men up front, with Iio on the left, and Takanori Nunobe to his right.

Iio's first J1 League appearance for Avispa came against FC Tokyo on 19 July 2006, when he came on as an 84th-minute substitute for fellow striker Mitsunori Yabuta. This game was held at the Hakatanomori Football Stadium, and ended in a goalless draw. Iio would not have to wait long for his first Avispa goal however, as just 10 days later, on the 29 July 2006 contest between Gamba Osaka and Avispa, Iio netted a goal in a match that eventually ended in a 2-2 draw.

Following Avispa's relegation, Iio returned to Verdy for the start of the 2007 season. Iio would appear regularly for Verdy in this campaign, occasionally even appearing as a right-winger in Verdy's midfield. He finished the campaign with 19 games, scoring 2 goals.

He moved to Yokohama FC in 2014. However he could hardly play in the match and he left the club end of 2015 season.

== National team career ==
Iio has represented Japan U-20 national team, but has yet to be given a full international cap. Iio was selected for the 2001 World Youth Championship, along with his strike partner at Tokyo Verdy, Kazuki Hiramoto. At this tournament, he played all 3 matches.

== Club statistics ==
Club performance			League		Cup		League Cup		Continental		Total	
Season	Club	League	Apps	Goals	Apps	Goals	Apps	Goals	Apps	Goals	Apps	Goals
Japan			League		Emperor's Cup		J.League Cup		Asia		Total	
1999	Verdy Kawasaki	J1 League	4	0	1	1	2	0	-		7	1
2000	Verdy Kawasaki	J1 League	26	4	2	0	4	0	-		32	4
2001	Tokyo Verdy	J1 League	11	0	0	0	1	1	-		12	1
2002	Kawasaki Frontale	J2 League	7	2	0	0	-		-		7	2
2003	Tokyo Verdy	J1 League	13	2	0	0	5	0	-		18	2
2004	Tokyo Verdy	J1 League	12	0	5	1	3	0	-		20	1
2005	Kawasaki Frontale	J1 League	5	0	0	0	1	0	-		6	0
2006	Tokyo Verdy	J2 League	9	1	0	0	-		2	0	11	1
2006	Avispa Fukuoka	J1 League	17	4	1	0	0	0	-		18	4
2007	Tokyo Verdy	J2 League	19	2	0	0	-		-		19	2
2008	Tokyo Verdy	J1 League	26	2	1	0	4	0	-		31	2
2009	Tokyo Verdy	J2 League	28	1	1	0	-		-		29	1
2010	Tokyo Verdy	J2 League	31	5	1	0	-		-		32	5
2011	Tokyo Verdy	J2 League	25	4	0	0	-		-		25	4
2012	Tokyo Verdy	J2 League	35	4	1	1	-		-		36	5
2013	Tokyo Verdy	J2 League	37	5	2	0	-		-		39	5
2014	Yokohama FC	J2 League	9	1	0	0	-		-		9	1
2015	Yokohama FC	J2 League	1	0	0	0	-		-		1	0
Total			315	37	15	3	20	1	2	0	352	41
