= Lucas Severino =

Brazilian footballer (born 1979)

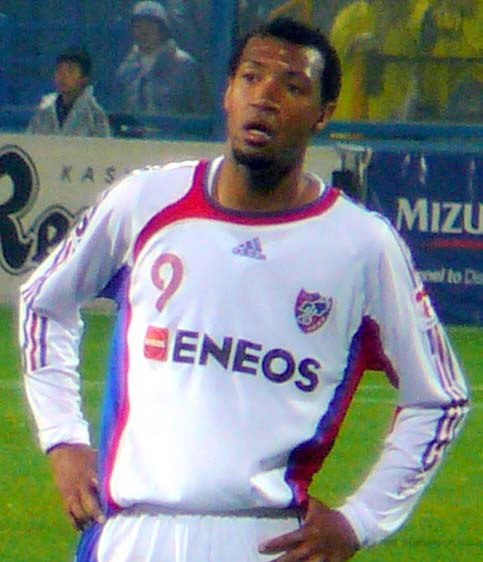
- Severino with FC Tokyo in 2007

Personal information
- Full name: Lucas Severino
- Date of birth: 3 January 1979 (age 47)
- Place of birth: Ribeirão Preto, Brazil
- Height: 6 ft 0 in (1.83 m)
- Position: Forward

Youth career
- Botafogo (SP)

Senior career*
Years	Team	Apps	(Gls)
1996–1997	Botafogo (SP)	12	(2)
1998–2000	Atlético Paranaense	48	(19)
2000–2003	Rennes	72	(6)
2002	→ Cruzeiro (loan)	7	(2)
2003	→ Corinthians (loan)	3	(1)
2004–2007	FC Tokyo	120	(48)
2008–2010	Gamba Osaka	80	(21)
2011	Atlético Paranaense	16	(4)
2011–2013	FC Tokyo	91	(30)

International career
2000	Brazil U-23	14	(3)
- * Club domestic league appearances and goals

Lucas Severino (born 3 January 1979), commonly known as Lucas, is a Brazilian former professional footballer who played as a forward. He played for the Brazil national team at the 2000 Summer Olympics in Australia.

== Club career ==
=== Rennes ===
Lucas Severino was born in Ribeirão Preto. He began his career in Brazil with Botafogo (SP) and then Atlético Paranaense. He moved to Ligue 1 side Rennes for €21 million. He made 72 league appearances with the side over three seasons, scoring six goals.

=== FC Tokyo ===
On 1 January 2004, Lucas Severino signed for J1 League FC Tokyo on a free transfer. He played four seasons for the club, winning the J.League Cup in 2004.

=== Gamba Osaka ===
On 1 January 2008, after four years at FC Tokyo, Lucas Severino moved to J1 League club Gamba Osaka on a free transfer.

=== Return to FC Tokyo ===
After three years with Gamba Osaka and a short spell in Brazil for Atlético Paranaense in 2011 Lucas retired from the game. However, in July 2011, he returned to sign for his former club FC Tokyo in the J2 League. His return helped FC Tokyo to promotion from J2 League back to the J1 League.

== International career ==
Lucas Severino made fourteen appearances for Brazil U23, appearing in the 2000 Summer Olympics, where he played three matches.

== Personal life ==
His sons, Pedro and João Victor, also became professional football players, having started their careers at Botafogo-SP.

== Career statistics ==
As of 23 February 2014

Appearances and goals by club, season and competition
Club	Season	League			National cup		League cup		Continental		Total	
Club	Season	Division	Apps	Goals	Apps	Goals	Apps	Goals	Apps	Goals	Apps	Goals
Club Atlético Paranaense	1998	Série A	15	3							15	3
Club Atlético Paranaense	1999	Série A	28	11							28	11
Club Atlético Paranaense	2000	Série A	0	0							0	0
Club Atlético Paranaense	Total		43	14							43	14
Rennes	2000–01	Division 1	28	4							28	4
Rennes	2001–02	Division 1	33	2							33	2
Rennes	2003–04	Ligue 1	11	0							11	0
Rennes	Total		72	6							72	6
Cruzeiro	2002	Série A	7	0							7	0
Corinthians	2003	Série A	3	0							3	0
FC Tokyo	2004	J1 League	27	11	3	1	7	6	–		37	18
FC Tokyo	2005	J1 League	30	7	1	0	2	0	–		33	7
FC Tokyo	2006	J1 League	31	18	2	2	5	0	–		38	20
FC Tokyo	2007	J1 League	32	12	3	0	8	2	–		43	14
FC Tokyo	Total		120	48	9	3	22	8	0	0	151	59
Gamba Osaka	2008	J1 League	31	8	5	1	4	1	9	6	49	16
Gamba Osaka	2009	J1 League	30	6	6	8	2	0	5	0	43	14
Gamba Osaka	2010	J1 League	19	7	3	1	2	1	4	1	28	10
Gamba Osaka	Total		80	21	14	10	8	2	18	7	120	40
Atlético Paranaense	2011	Série A	16	4	4	3	0	0	0	0	20	7
FC Tokyo	2011	J2 League	23	9	6	3	–		–		29	12
FC Tokyo	2012	J1 League	34	10	1	0	4	1	5	0	44	11
FC Tokyo	2013	J1 League	34	11	3	0	1	1	–		38	12
FC Tokyo	Total		91	30	10	3	5	2	5	0	111	35
Career total			432	123	37	19	35	12	23	7	527	161

== Honours ==
Club

- AFC Champions League – 2008
- Pan-Pacific Championship – 2008
- Emperor's Cup – 2008, 2009, 2011
- J.League Cup – 2004
