= Jean Carlo Witte =

Brazilian footballer

Jean
Personal information
- Full name: Jean Carlo Witte
- Date of birth: September 24, 1977 (age 49)
- Place of birth: Brazil
- Height: 1.85 m (6 ft 1 in)
- Position: Defender

Senior career*
Years	Team	Apps	(Gls)
1995–2000	Santos	71	(5)
2000–2001	Bahia	38	(4)
2002–2006	FC Tokyo	141	(9)
2007–2010	Shonan Bellmare	124	(12)

International career
1997	Brazil U20		
- * Club domestic league appearances and goals

Jean Carlo Witte (born 24 September 1977 in Blumenau, Santa Catarina) is a Brazilian football (soccer) defender.

He played for Santos and Brazilian U-20 team at 1997 FIFA World Youth Championship.

== Club statistics ==
Club performance			League		Cup		League Cup		Total	
Season	Club	League	Apps	Goals	Apps	Goals	Apps	Goals	Apps	Goals
Japan			League		Emperor's Cup		J.League Cup		Total	
2002	FC Tokyo	J1 League	27	1	1	0	6	0	34	1
2003	FC Tokyo	J1 League	29	2	1	0	6	1	36	3
2004	FC Tokyo	J1 League	26	3	2	1	8	3	36	7
2005	FC Tokyo	J1 League	34	0	1	0	6	0	41	0
2006	FC Tokyo	J1 League	25	3	0	0	6	0	31	3
2007	Shonan Bellmare	J2 League	37	3	1	0	-		38	3
2008	Shonan Bellmare	J2 League	23	2	1	0	-		24	2
2009	Shonan Bellmare	J2 League	49	6	0	0	-		49	6
2010	Shonan Bellmare	J1 League	15	1	0	0	0	0	15	1
Total			265	21	7	1	32	4	304	26

== Honors ==
=== Team ===
- J.League Cup Champions : 2004
