= 2004 J.League Cup =

J.League Yamazaki Nabisco Cup
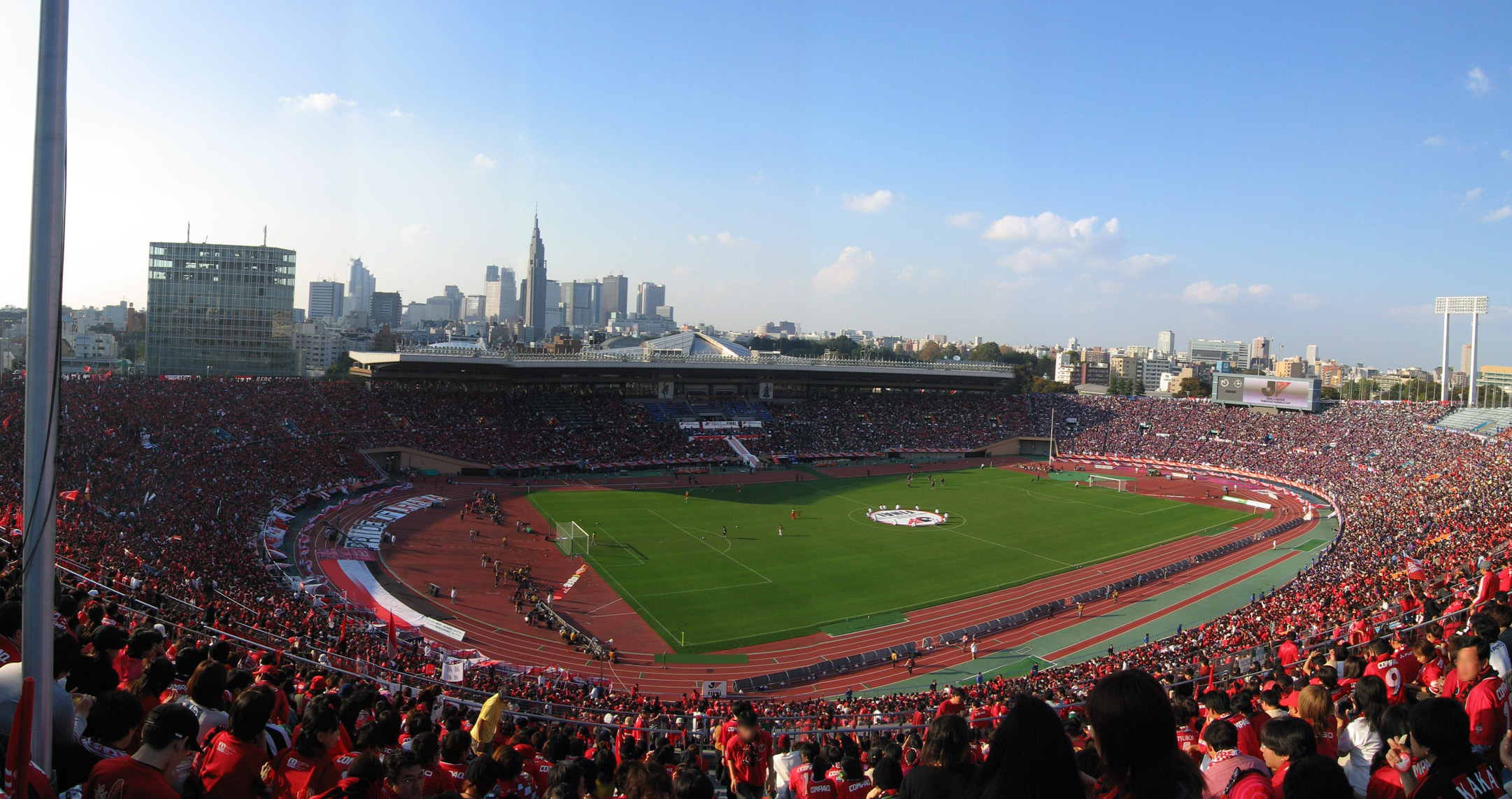
- The final at the National Stadium in Tokyo

Tournament details
- Country: Japan
- Dates: 27 March 2004 and 3 November 2004

Final positions
- Champions: FC Tokyo (1st title)
- Runners-up: Urawa Red Diamonds
- Semifinalists: Nagoya Grampus Eight; Tokyo Verdy 1969

The J. League Cup 2004, officially the 2004 J.League Yamazaki Nabisco Cup, was the 2nd edition of Japan soccer league cup tournament and the 12th edition under the current J. League Cup format. The competition started on March 27, and finished on November 3, 2004.

Teams from the J1 took part in the tournament. The tournament started from the group stage, where they're divided into four groups. The group winners and runners-up of each group qualifies for the quarter final.

== Group stage ==
=== Group A ===
Team	Pld	W	D	L	GF	GA	GD	Pts
Tokyo Verdy 1969	6	5	1	0	16	4	+12	16
Yokohama F. Marinos	6	3	1	2	5	6	−1	10
Sanfrecce Hiroshima	6	2	1	3	6	8	−2	7
Cerezo Osaka	6	0	1	5	2	11	−9	1

2004-03-27
Sanfrecce Hiroshima	0–0	Yokohama F. Marinos
Cerezo Osaka	1–1	Tokyo Verdy 1969
2004-04-29
Yokohama F. Marinos	2–1	Sanfrecce Hiroshima
Tokyo Verdy 1969	4–1	Cerezo Osaka
2004-05-29
Tokyo Verdy 1969	3–0	Sanfrecce Hiroshima
Cerezo Osaka	0–1	Yokohama F. Marinos
2004-06-05
Yokohama F. Marinos	1–2	Tokyo Verdy 1969
Sanfrecce Hiroshima	2–0	Cerezo Osaka
2004-07-17
Tokyo Verdy 1969	3–0	Yokohama F. Marinos
Cerezo Osaka	0–2	Sanfrecce Hiroshima
2004-07-24
Yokohama F. Marinos	1–0	Cerezo Osaka
Sanfrecce Hiroshima	1–3	Tokyo Verdy 1969

=== Group B ===
Team	Pld	W	D	L	GF	GA	GD	Pts
Nagoya Grampus Eight	6	3	2	1	13	8	+5	11
Gamba Osaka	6	2	2	2	12	12	0	8
Albirex Niigata	6	1	3	2	7	9	−2	6
Jubilo Iwata	6	1	3	2	7	10	−3	6

2004-03-27
Jubilo Iwata	0–0	Albirex Niigata
Gamba Osaka	1–3	Nagoya Grampus Eight
2004-04-29
Albirex Niigata	4–4	Gamba Osaka
Nagoya Grampus Eight	5–2	Jubilo Iwata
2004-05-29
Jubilo Iwata	0–1	Gamba Osaka
Nagoya Grampus Eight	1–2	Albirex Niigata
2004-06-05
Gamba Osaka	2–3	Jubilo Iwata
Albirex Niigata	0–1	Nagoya Grampus Eight
2004-07-17
Albirex Niigata	1–1	Jubilo Iwata
Nagoya Grampus Eight	2–2	Gamba Osaka
2004-07-24
Jubilo Iwata	1–1	Nagoya Grampus Eight
Gamba Osaka	2–0	Albirex Niigata

=== Group C ===
Team	Pld	W	D	L	GF	GA	GD	Pts
Urawa Red Diamonds	6	4	0	2	12	7	+5	12
Shimizu S-Pulse	6	4	0	2	8	9	−1	12
JEF United Ichihara	6	3	0	3	14	8	+6	9
Oita Trinita	5	1	0	4	4	14	−10	3

2004-03-27
Urawa Red Diamonds	2–3	Oita Trinita
JEF United Ichihara	4–0	Shimizu S-Pulse
2004-04-29
Shimizu S-Pulse	2–0	Urawa Red Diamonds
Oita Trinita	1–4	JEF United Ichihara
2004-05-29
Shimizu S-Pulse	3–2	JEF United Ichihara
Oita Trinita	0–3	Urawa Red Diamonds
2004-06-05
JEF United Ichihara	2–0	Oita Trinita
Urawa Red Diamonds	3–0	Shimizu S-Pulse
2004-07-17
Urawa Red Diamonds	2–1	JEF United Ichihara
Shimizu S-Pulse	1–0	Oita Trinita
2004-07-24
JEF United Ichihara	1–2	Urawa Red Diamonds
Oita Trinita	0–2	Shimizu S-Pulse

=== Group D ===
Team	Pld	W	D	L	GF	GA	GD	Pts
FC Tokyo	6	4	1	1	10	6	+4	13
Kashima Antlers	6	3	1	2	8	5	+3	10
Kashiwa Reysol	6	1	3	2	4	5	−1	6
Vissel Kobe	6	1	1	4	4	10	−6	4

2004-03-27
Vissel Kobe	1–0	Kashiwa Reysol
FC Tokyo	1–2	Kashima Antlers
2004-04-29
Kashima Antlers	1–2	FC Tokyo
Kashiwa Reysol	1–1	Vissel Kobe
2004-05-29
Vissel Kobe	0–3	Kashima Antlers
Kashiwa Reysol	0–2	FC Tokyo
2004-06-05
Kashima Antlers	0–2	Kashiwa Reysol
FC Tokyo	2–1	Vissel Kobe
2004-07-17
Kashiwa Reysol	0–0	Kashima Antlers
Vissel Kobe	1–2	FC Tokyo
2004-07-24
Kashima Antlers	2–0	Vissel Kobe
FC Tokyo	1–1	Kashiwa Reysol

== Knockout stage ==
=== Quarter finals ===
2004-09-04
18:00

Urawa Red Diamonds	3–2	Yokohama F. Marinos
Yamase 16'; Emerson 37', 66'		Oku 12'; Sakata 63'

Saitama Stadium
Attendance: 28,977
Referee: Masayoshi Okada

2004-09-04
19:02

Nagoya Grampus Eight	2–1	Kashima Antlers
Igawa 37'; Marques 70'		Nakashima 64'

Mizuho Athletic Stadium
Attendance: 6,068
Referee: Yoshitsugu Katayama

2004-09-04
19:16

FC Tokyo	4–1	Gamba Osaka
Kelly 44'; Abe 66'; Kajiyama 77'; Jean 79'		16' (o.g.)

Tokyo National Stadium
Attendance: 14,069
Referee: Toru Kamikawa

2004-09-04
19:02

Tokyo Verdy 1969	2–1 (a.e.t.)	Shimizu S-Pulse
Yamada 35'; Sakurai 104'		Cho Jae-Jin 26'

Ajinomoto Stadium
Attendance: 6,644
Referee: Kiyoshi Ota

=== Semifinals ===
2004-10-11
15:03

Nagoya Grampus Eight	1–4	Urawa Red Diamonds
Nakamura 76'		Emerson 26'; Tanaka 33', 57', 84'

Mizuho Athletic Stadium
Attendance: 17,473
Referee: Kazuhiko Matsumura

2004-10-13
19:01

FC Tokyo	4–3 (a.e.t.)	Tokyo Verdy 1969
Jean 6'; Lucas 14', 42', 91'		Yamada 47'; Hiramoto 78'; Kobayashi 79'

Ajinomoto Stadium
Attendance: 15,885
Referee: Joji Kashihara

=== Final ===
2004-11-03
14:07

FC Tokyo	0–0 (a.e.t.)	Urawa Red Diamonds
Penalties
Lucas (penalty scored); Baba (penalty scored); Konno (penalty scored); Kajiyama (penalty missed); Kaji (penalty scored)	4–2	(penalty scored) Tulio; (penalty scored) Hasebe; (penalty missed) Tanaka; (penalty missed) Yamada

Tokyo National Stadium
Attendance: 53,236
Referee: Toshimitsu Yoshida

== Top goalscorers ==
Goalscorers	Goals	Team
(Brazil) Ueslei	7	Nagoya Grampus Eight
(Brazil) Lucas	6	FC Tokyo
(Brazil) Marques	5	Nagoya Grampus Eight

== Awards ==
- MVP: Yoichi Doi (FC Tokyo)
- New Hero Prize: Makoto Hasebe (Urawa Red Diamonds)
