= 2008 FC Tokyo season =

FC Tokyo
2008 season
- Manager: Hiroshi Jofuku
- Stadium: Ajinomoto Stadium
- J.League 1: 6th
- Emperor's Cup: Semifinals
- J.League Cup: Quarterfinals
- Top goalscorer: Shingo Akamine (12)
- Average home league attendance: 25,716
Home colours	Away colours

The 2008 FC Tokyo season was the team's 10th season as a member of J.League Division 1.

== Competitions ==
Competitions	Position
J.League 1	6th / 18 clubs
Emperor's Cup	Semifinals
J.League Cup	Quarterfinals

== Domestic results ==
=== J.League 1 ===
Match	Date	Venue	Opponents	Score
1	2008..			-
2	2008..			-
3	2008..			-
4	2008..			-
5	2008..			-
6	2008..			-
7	2008..			-
8	2008..			-
9	2008..			-
10	2008..			-
11	2008..			-
12	2008..			-
13	2008..			-
14	2008..			-
15	2008..			-
16	2008..			-
17	2008..			-
18	2008..			-
19	2008..			-
20	2008..			-
21	2008..			-
22	2008..			-
23	2008..			-
24	2008..			-
25	2008..			-
26	2008..			-
27	2008..			-
28	2008..			-
29	2008..			-
30	2008..			-
31	2008..			-
32	2008..			-
33	2008..			-
34	2008..			-

=== Emperor's Cup ===
Match	Date	Venue	Opponents	Score
4th round	2008..			-
5th round	2008..			-
Quarterfinals	2008..			-
Semifinals	2008..			-

=== J.League Cup ===
Match	Date	Venue	Opponents	Score
GL-B-1	2008..			-
GL-B-2	2008..			-
GL-B-3	2008..			-
GL-B-4	2008..			-
GL-B-5	2008..			-
GL-B-6	2008..			-
Quarterfinals-1	2008..			-
Quarterfinals-2	2008..			-

== Player statistics ==
No.	Pos.	Player	D.o.B. (Age)	Height / Weight	J.League 1		Emperor's Cup		J.League Cup		Total	
No.	Pos.	Player	D.o.B. (Age)	Height / Weight	Apps	Goals	Apps	Goals	Apps	Goals	Apps	Goals
1	GK	Hitoshi Shiota	May 28, 1981 (aged 26)	cm / kg	34	0						
2	DF	Teruyuki Moniwa	September 8, 1981 (aged 26)	cm / kg	22	0						
3	DF	Hideki Sahara	May 15, 1978 (aged 29)	cm / kg	28	2						
4	DF	Bruno Quadros	February 3, 1977 (aged 31)	cm / kg	2	0						
5	DF	Yuto Nagatomo	September 12, 1986 (aged 21)	cm / kg	29	3						
6	DF	Yasuyuki Konno	January 25, 1983 (aged 25)	cm / kg	32	4						
7	MF	Satoru Asari	June 10, 1974 (aged 33)	cm / kg	25	0						
8	DF	Ryuji Fujiyama	June 9, 1973 (aged 34)	cm / kg	15	0						
9	FW	Cabore	February 19, 1980 (aged 28)	cm / kg	34	11						
10	MF	Yōhei Kajiyama	September 24, 1985 (aged 22)	cm / kg	28	1						
13	FW	Sōta Hirayama	June 6, 1985 (aged 22)	cm / kg	24	2						
15	MF	Emerson	April 23, 1980 (aged 27)	cm / kg	20	3						
16	MF	Reiichi Ikegami	July 12, 1983 (aged 24)	cm / kg	0	0						
17	DF	Jo Kanazawa	July 9, 1976 (aged 31)	cm / kg	14	0						
18	MF	Naohiro Ishikawa	May 12, 1981 (aged 26)	cm / kg	21	2						
19	GK	Shuichi Gonda	March 3, 1989 (aged 19)	cm / kg	0	0						
20	FW	Nobuo Kawaguchi	April 10, 1975 (aged 32)	cm / kg	7	0						
21	GK	Nobuyuki Abe	April 27, 1984 (aged 23)	cm / kg	0	0						
22	MF	Naotake Hanyu	December 22, 1979 (aged 28)	cm / kg	27	1						
23	MF	Kota Morimura	August 14, 1988 (aged 19)	cm / kg	2	0						
24	FW	Shingo Akamine	December 8, 1983 (aged 24)	cm / kg	30	12						
25	DF	Yuhei Tokunaga	September 25, 1983 (aged 24)	cm / kg	30	1						
26	DF	Taishi Koyama	April 29, 1988 (aged 19)	cm / kg	0	0						
27	MF	Ryoichi Kurisawa	September 5, 1982 (aged 25)	cm / kg	4	0						
28	MF	Kenji Suzuki	September 3, 1986 (aged 21)	cm / kg	0	0						
29	DF	Kazunori Yoshimoto	April 24, 1988 (aged 19)	cm / kg	2	1						
30	MF	Yohei Otake	May 2, 1989 (aged 18)	cm / kg	23	4						
31	GK	Kota Ogi	May 5, 1983 (aged 24)	cm / kg	0	0						
32	FW	Yusuke Kondo	December 5, 1984 (aged 23)	cm / kg	6	0						
33	DF	Kenta Mukuhara	July 6, 1989 (aged 18)	cm / kg	3	0						
34	GK	Ryotaro Hironaga	January 9, 1990 (aged 18)	cm / kg	0	0						
35	MF	Kohei Shimoda	April 8, 1989 (aged 18)	cm / kg	0	0						
40	FW	Tatsuya Suzuki	August 1, 1982 (aged 25)	cm / kg	8	1						

== Other pages ==
- (in Japanese) J. League official site
