= 2007 FC Tokyo season =

FC Tokyo
2007 season
- Manager: Hiromi Hara
- Stadium: Ajinomoto Stadium
- J.League 1: 12th
- Emperor's Cup: Quarter-final
- J.League Cup: Quarter-final
- Top goalscorer: Lucas (12)
- Average home league attendance: 25,290
Home colours	Away colours

During the 2007 season, FC Tokyo competed in the J. League 1, where they finished 12th. The club also competed in the Emperor's Cup and the J. League Cup.

== Competitions ==
Competitions	Position
J.League 1	12th / 18 clubs
Emperor's Cup	Quarterfinals
J.League Cup	Quarterfinals

=== J.League 1 ===
==== League table ====
Pos	Team	Pld	W	D	L	GF	GA	GD	Pts
10	Vissel Kobe	34	13	8	13	58	48	+10	47
11	Nagoya Grampus Eight	34	13	6	15	43	45	−2	45
12	FC Tokyo	34	14	3	17	49	58	−9	45
13	JEF United Chiba	34	12	6	16	51	56	−5	42
14	Oita Trinita	34	12	5	17	42	60	−18	41

Updated to match(es) played on December 1, 2007. Source: J. League Division 1
Rules for classification: 1) points; 2) goal difference; 3) number of goals scored.

==== Results ====
J.League Division 1 results
Date	Opponent	Venue	Result F–A
3 March 2007	Sanfrecce Hiroshima	H	2–4
10 March 2007	Omiya Ardija	A	2–0
18 March 2007	Júbilo Iwata	H	0–1
31 March 2007	Kashiwa Reysol	A	0–2
7 April 2007	Albirex Niigata	H	1–3
15 April 2007	Oita Trinita	A	0–0
21 April 2007	Yokohama FC	H	1–0
28 April 2007	Vissel Kobe	A	0–0
3 May 2007	Kashima Antlers	H	1–2
6 May 2007	Kawasaki Frontale	A	2–5
12 May 2007	JEF United Chiba	H	4–1
20 May 2007	Yokohama F. Marinos	A	1–0
26 May 2007	Nagoya Grampus Eight	H	0–1
10 June 2007	Shimizu S-Pulse	A	3–1
17 June 2007	Urawa Red Diamonds	H	0–2
20 June 2007	Ventforet Kofu	H	2–1
23 June 2007	Gamba Osaka	A	2–6
30 June 2007	Kashima Antlers	A	2–1
11 August 2007	Oita Trinita	H	1–2
15 August 2007	Júbilo Iwata	A	2–5
18 August 2007	Kashiwa Reysol	H	0–1
25 August 2007	Urawa Red Diamonds	A	2–3
29 August 2007	Sanfrecce Hiroshima	A	5–0
1 September 2007	Vissel Kobe	H	3–1
15 September 2007	Yokohama FC	A	2–0
23 September 2007	Shimizu S-Pulse	H	2–0
30 September 2007	JEF United Chiba	A	2–3
6 October 2007	Yokohama F. Marinos	H	2–1
21 October 2007	Nagoya Grampus Eight	A	1–0
28 October 2007	Kawasaki Frontale	H	0–7
10 November 2007	Albirex Niigata	A	1–2
18 November 2007	Gamba Osaka	H	1–1
24 November 2007	Omiya Ardija	H	1–2
1 December 2007	Ventforet Kofu	A	1–0

== Player statistics ==
No.	Pos.	Player	D.o.B. (Age)	Height / Weight	J.League 1		Emperor's Cup		J.League Cup		Total	
No.	Pos.	Player	D.o.B. (Age)	Height / Weight	Apps	Goals	Apps	Goals	Apps	Goals	Apps	Goals
1	GK	Yoichi Doi	25 July 1973 (aged 33)	cm / kg	14	0						
2	DF	Teruyuki Moniwa	8 September 1981 (aged 25)	cm / kg	17	0						
3	DF	Evaldo	4 January 1983 (aged 24)	cm / kg	0	0						
4	DF	Kosuke Yatsuda	17 March 1982 (aged 24)	cm / kg	1	0						
6	DF	Yasuyuki Konno	25 January 1983 (aged 24)	cm / kg	33	5						
7	MF	Satoru Asari	10 June 1974 (aged 32)	cm / kg	16	0						
8	DF	Ryuji Fujiyama	9 June 1973 (aged 33)	cm / kg	32	0						
9	FW	Lucas Severino	3 January 1979 (aged 28)	cm / kg	32	12						
10	FW	Paulo Wanchope	31 July 1976 (aged 30)	cm / kg	12	2						
13	FW	Sōta Hirayama	6 June 1985 (aged 21)	cm / kg	20	5						
14	MF	Yuta Baba	22 January 1984 (aged 23)	cm / kg	16	1						
15	MF	Norio Suzuki	14 February 1984 (aged 23)	cm / kg	30	5						
16	MF	Reiichi Ikegami	12 July 1983 (aged 23)	cm / kg	2	0						
17	DF	Jo Kanazawa	9 July 1976 (aged 30)	cm / kg	29	0						
18	MF	Naohiro Ishikawa	12 May 1981 (aged 25)	cm / kg	27	4						
19	DF	Masahiko Inoha	28 August 1985 (aged 21)	cm / kg	20	0						
20	FW	Nobuo Kawaguchi	10 April 1975 (aged 31)	cm / kg	14	0						
22	GK	Hitoshi Shiota	28 May 1981 (aged 25)	cm / kg	20	0						
23	MF	Yōhei Kajiyama	24 September 1985 (aged 21)	cm / kg	24	1						
24	FW	Shingo Akamine	8 December 1983 (aged 23)	cm / kg	15	4						
25	DF	Yuhei Tokunaga	25 September 1983 (aged 23)	cm / kg	33	0						
26	DF	Taishi Koyama	29 April 1988 (aged 18)	cm / kg	0	0						
27	MF	Ryoichi Kurisawa	5 September 1982 (aged 24)	cm / kg	22	0						
28	MF	Kenji Suzuki	3 September 1986 (aged 20)	cm / kg	0	0						
29	DF	Kazunori Yoshimoto	24 April 1988 (aged 18)	cm / kg	1	0						
30	MF	Kota Morimura	14 August 1988 (aged 18)	cm / kg	1	0						
31	GK	Nobuyuki Abe	27 April 1984 (aged 22)	cm / kg	0	0						
33	FW	Ryuki Kozawa	6 February 1988 (aged 19)	cm / kg	0	0						
34	GK	Shuichi Gonda	3 March 1989 (aged 18)	cm / kg	0	0						
35	FW	Rychely	6 August 1987 (aged 19)	cm / kg	16	1						
36	DF	Yuto Nagatomo	12 September 1986 (aged 20)	cm / kg	0	0						
37	MF	Takashi Fukunishi	1 September 1976 (aged 30)	cm / kg	28	6						

== Other pages ==
- (in Japanese) J. League official site
