= 2009 FC Tokyo season =

FC Tokyo
2009 season
- Manager: Hiroshi Jofuku
- Stadium: Ajinomoto Stadium
- J.League 1: 5th
- Emperor's Cup: 4th Round
- J.League Cup: Champions
- Top goalscorer: Naohiro Ishikawa (15)
Home colours	Away colours

The 2009 FC Tokyo season was the team's 11th as a member of J.League Division 1.

== Competitions ==
Competitions	Position
J.League 1	5th / 18 clubs
Emperor's Cup	4th round
J.League Cup	Champions

== Player statistics ==
No.	Pos.	Player	D.o.B. (Age)	Height / Weight	J.League 1		Emperor's Cup		J.League Cup		Total	
No.	Pos.	Player	D.o.B. (Age)	Height / Weight	Apps	Goals	Apps	Goals	Apps	Goals	Apps	Goals
1	GK	Hitoshi Shiota	May 28, 1981 (aged 27)	cm / kg	0	0						
2	DF	Teruyuki Moniwa	September 8, 1981 (aged 27)	cm / kg	9	0						
3	DF	Hideki Sahara	May 15, 1978 (aged 30)	cm / kg	7	0						
4	DF	Bruno Quadros	February 3, 1977 (aged 32)	cm / kg	23	0						
5	DF	Yuto Nagatomo	September 12, 1986 (aged 22)	cm / kg	31	1						
6	DF	Yasuyuki Konno	January 25, 1983 (aged 26)	cm / kg	34	2						
7	MF	Satoru Asari	June 10, 1974 (aged 34)	cm / kg	5	0						
8	DF	Ryuji Fujiyama	June 9, 1973 (aged 35)	cm / kg	4	0						
9	FW	Cabore	February 19, 1980 (aged 29)	cm / kg	21	5						
10	MF	Yōhei Kajiyama	September 24, 1985 (aged 23)	cm / kg	31	2						
13	FW	Sōta Hirayama	June 6, 1985 (aged 23)	cm / kg	26	4						
14	DF	Hokuto Nakamura	July 10, 1985 (aged 23)	cm / kg	10	2						
15	DF	Daishi Hiramatsu	July 3, 1983 (aged 25)	cm / kg	7	1						
17	DF	Jo Kanazawa	July 9, 1976 (aged 32)	cm / kg	4	0						
18	MF	Naohiro Ishikawa	May 12, 1981 (aged 27)	cm / kg	24	15						
19	MF	Yohei Otake	May 2, 1989 (aged 19)	cm / kg	13	0						
20	GK	Shuichi Gonda	March 3, 1989 (aged 20)	cm / kg	34	0						
21	GK	Nobuyuki Abe	April 27, 1984 (aged 24)	cm / kg	0	0						
22	MF	Naotake Hanyu	December 22, 1979 (aged 29)	cm / kg	34	2						
24	FW	Shingo Akamine	December 8, 1983 (aged 25)	cm / kg	28	5						
25	DF	Yuhei Tokunaga	September 25, 1983 (aged 25)	cm / kg	34	0						
26	DF	Taishi Koyama	April 29, 1988 (aged 20)	cm / kg	0	0						
27	MF	Sotan Tanabe	April 6, 1990 (aged 18)	cm / kg	10	0						
28	MF	Takuji Yonemoto	December 3, 1990 (aged 18)	cm / kg	28	1						
29	DF	Kazunori Yoshimoto	April 24, 1988 (aged 20)	cm / kg	0	0						
31	GK	Ryotaro Hironaga	January 9, 1990 (aged 19)	cm / kg	0	0						
32	FW	Yusuke Kondo	December 5, 1984 (aged 24)	cm / kg	12	2						
33	DF	Kenta Mukuhara	July 6, 1989 (aged 19)	cm / kg	11	0						
35	MF	Kohei Shimoda	April 8, 1989 (aged 19)	cm / kg	0	0						
40	FW	Tatsuya Suzuki	August 1, 1982 (aged 26)	cm / kg	33	4						

== Other pages ==
- (in Japanese) J. League official site
