= 2004 J.League Cup final =

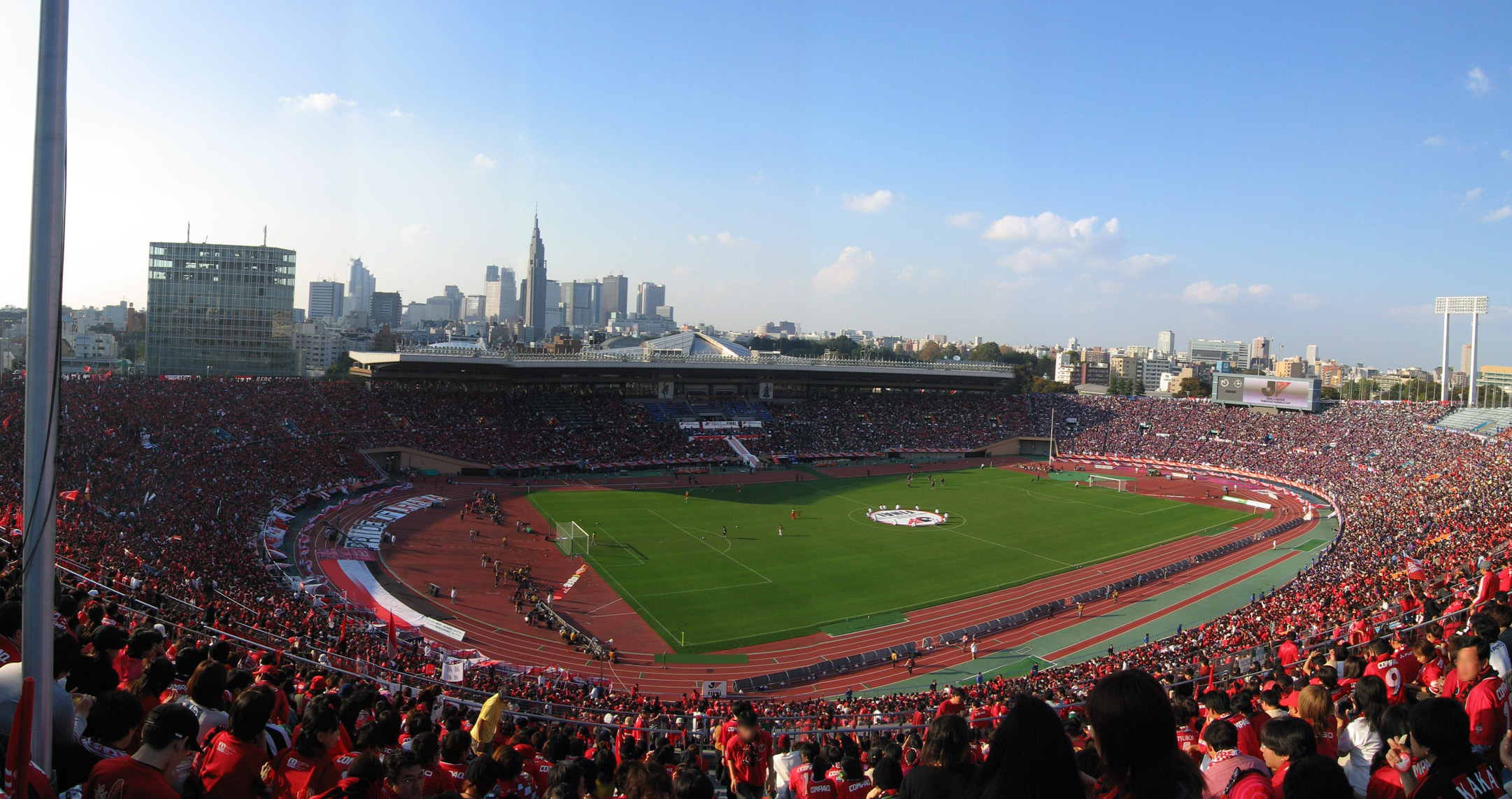
FC Tokyo	Urawa Reds
0	0
- FC Tokyo won 4–2 on penalties
- Date: November 3, 2004
- Venue: National Stadium, Tokyo

The 2004 J.League Cup final was the 12th final of the J.League Cup competition. The final was played at National Stadium in Tokyo on November 3, 2004. FC Tokyo won the championship.

== Match details ==
November 3, 2004

FC Tokyo	0–0	Urawa Reds
	Report
Penalties
	4–2

National Stadium

FC Tokyo
GK	1	(Japan) Yoichi Doi
DF	20	(Japan) Akira Kaji
DF	2	(Japan) Teruyuki Moniwa
DF	3	(Brazil) Jean
DF	17	(Japan) Jo Kanazawa
MF	18	(Japan) Naohiro Ishikawa
MF	6	(Japan) Yasuyuki Konno
MF	10	(Japan) Fumitake Miura	(substituted off) 33'
MF	19	(Brazil) Kelly	(substituted off) 71'
FW	9	(Brazil) Lucas
FW	13	(Japan) Mitsuhiro Toda	(substituted off) 84'
Substitutes:
GK	22	(Japan) Hitoshi Shiota
DF	8	(Japan) Ryuji Fujiyama	(substituted on) 33'
MF	14	(Japan) Yuta Baba	(substituted on) 84'
MF	23	(Japan) Yohei Kajiyama	(substituted on) 71'
FW	11	(Japan) Yoshiro Abe
Manager:
(Japan) Hiromi Hara

Urawa Reds
GK	1	(Japan) Norihiro Yamagishi
DF	3	(Turkey) Alpay
DF	4	(Japan) Marcus Tulio Tanaka
DF	33	(Brazil) Nene
MF	6	(Japan) Nobuhisa Yamada
MF	17	(Japan) Makoto Hasebe
MF	16	(Japan) Alessandro Santos	(substituted off) 64'
MF	13	(Japan) Keita Suzuki
FW	11	(Japan) Tatsuya Tanaka
FW	9	(Japan) Yuichiro Nagai	(substituted off) 110'
FW	10	(Brazil) Emerson
Substitutes:
GK	23	(Japan) Ryota Tsuzuki
DF	19	(Japan) Hideki Uchidate
MF	7	(Japan) Tomoyuki Sakai
MF	14	(Japan) Tadaaki Hirakawa	(substituted on) 64'
FW	30	(Japan) Masayuki Okano	(substituted on) 110'
Manager:
(Germany) Buchwald

== See also ==
- 2004 J.League Cup
