= Toshiki Koike =

Japanese footballer

Toshiki Koike 小池 知己
Personal information
- Full name: Toshiki Koike
- Date of birth: November 10, 1974 (age 52)
- Place of birth: Kanagawa, Japan
- Height: 1.68 m (5 ft 6 in)
- Position: Midfielder

Youth career
- 1990–1992: Shichirigahama High School

Senior career*
Years	Team	Apps	(Gls)
1993–2001	FC Tokyo	96	(3)
2001	Mito HollyHock	16	(1)
2002	Shonan Bellmare	6	(0)
2003	Mito HollyHock	4	(0)
Total		122	(4)
- * Club domestic league appearances and goals

Toshiki Koike (小池 知己, Koike Toshiki; born November 10, 1974) is a former Japanese football player.

== Playing career ==
Koike was born in Kanagawa Prefecture on November 10, 1974. After graduating from high school, he joined the Japan Football League club Tokyo Gas (later FC Tokyo) in 1993. He played many matches as right side back from 1994. However his opportunity to play decreased behind newcomer Hiroki Shinjo in 1996. The club was promoted to the new J2 League in 1999. He was also converted to defensive midfielder and played many matches again. The club won second place in 1999 and was promoted to the J1 League in 2000. Although he played as a regular player in 2000, he could not play at all in the match behind new members Fumitake Miura and Takahiro Shimotaira in 2001. In August 2001, he moved to the J2 club Mito HollyHock and played as a regular player. In 2002, he moved to the J2 club Shonan Bellmare. However he could hardly play in any matches. In 2003, he moved to Mito HollyHock again. However he could hardly play in any matches and retired at the end of the 2003 season.

== Career statistics ==
Appearances and goals by club, season and competition
Club	Season	League			Emperor's Cup		J.League Cup		Total	
Club	Season	Division	Apps	Goals	Apps	Goals	Apps	Goals	Apps	Goals
Tokyo Gas	1993	Football League	1	0	—		—		1	0
Tokyo Gas	1994	Football League	15	0	0	0	—		15	0
Tokyo Gas	1995	Football League	22	0	1	0	—		23	0
Tokyo Gas	1996	Football League	8	0	0	0	—		8	0
Tokyo Gas	1997	Football League	0	0	0	0	—		0	0
Tokyo Gas	1998	Football League	1	0	0	0	—		1	0
FC Tokyo	1999	J2 League	22	1	1	0	5	0	28	1
FC Tokyo	2000	J1 League	27	2	1	0	2	0	30	2
FC Tokyo	2001	J1 League	0	0	0	0	0	0	0	0
Mito HollyHock	2001	J2 League	16	1	3	0	—		19	1
Shonan Bellmare	2002	J2 League	6	0	0	0	—		6	0
Mito HollyHock	2003	J2 League	4	0	0	0	—		4	0
Career total			122	4	6	0	7	0	135	4
