= 1999 FC Tokyo season =

FC Tokyo
1999 season
- Chairman: Hiroshi Nomoto
- Manager: Kiyoshi Okuma
- Stadium: Nishigaoka Soccer Stadium
- J.League 2: 2nd
- Emperor's Cup: 4th Round
- J.League Cup: Semifinals
- Top goalscorer: Amaral (15)
- Average home league attendance: 3,498
Home colours	Away colours

1999 FC Tokyo season

== Competitions ==
Competitions	Position
J.League 2	2nd / 10 clubs
Emperor's Cup	4th round
J.League Cup	Semifinals

== Domestic results ==
=== J.League 2 ===
14 March 1999 1	FC Tokyo	2-0	Sagan Tosu	Nishigaoka Soccer Stadium
JST (UTC+09)

21 March 1999 2	Vegalta Sendai	1-2	FC Tokyo	Sendai Stadium
JST (UTC+09)

28 March 1999 3	FC Tokyo	0-1	Albirex Niigata	Nishigaoka Soccer Stadium
JST (UTC+09)

4 April 1999 4	Kawasaki Frontale	2-2 (GG) (a.e.t.)	FC Tokyo	Todoroki Athletics Stadium
JST (UTC+09)

11 April 1999 5	FC Tokyo	0-1	Montedio Yamagata	Nishigaoka Soccer Stadium
JST (UTC+09)

17 April 1999 6	Oita Trinita	1-1 (GG) (a.e.t.)	FC Tokyo	Oita Athletic Stadium
JST (UTC+09)

23 April 1999 7	Ventforet Kofu	0-3	FC Tokyo	Kose Sports Park Stadium
JST (UTC+09)

29 April 1999 8	FC Tokyo	2-1	Consadole Sapporo	Nishigaoka Soccer Stadium
JST (UTC+09)

2 May 1999 9	Omiya Ardija	0-2	FC Tokyo	Omiya Football Stadium
JST (UTC+09)

5 May 1999 10	FC Tokyo	2-0	Vegalta Sendai	Nishigaoka Soccer Stadium
JST (UTC+09)

9 May 1999 11	Albirex Niigata	2-0	FC Tokyo	Niigata City Athletic Stadium
JST (UTC+09)

16 May 1999 12	FC Tokyo	0-1	Kawasaki Frontale	Nishigaoka Soccer Stadium
JST (UTC+09)

23 May 1999 13	Montedio Yamagata	1-2	FC Tokyo	Yamagata Park Stadium
JST (UTC+09)

29 May 1999 14	FC Tokyo	1-0 (GG) (a.e.t.)	Oita Trinita	Nishigaoka Soccer Stadium
JST (UTC+09)

27 June 1999 15	FC Tokyo	1-0	Ventforet Kofu	Edogawa Stadium
JST (UTC+09)

4 July 1999 16	Consadole Sapporo	0-1	FC Tokyo	Sapporo Atsubetsu Park Stadium
JST (UTC+09)

10 July 1999 17	FC Tokyo	2-0	Omiya Ardija	Edogawa Stadium
JST (UTC+09)

17 July 1999 18	Sagan Tosu	0-1	FC Tokyo	Tosu Stadium
JST (UTC+09)

1 August 1999 19	FC Tokyo	0-2	Albirex Niigata	Edogawa Stadium
JST (UTC+09)

7 August 1999 20	Oita Trinita	2-4	FC Tokyo	Oita Athletic Stadium
JST (UTC+09)

15 August 1999 21	FC Tokyo	1-0 (GG) (a.e.t.)	Montedio Yamagata	Edogawa Stadium
JST (UTC+09)

22 August 1999 22	Sagan Tosu	1-2	FC Tokyo	Tosu Stadium
JST (UTC+09)

29 August 1999 23	Consadole Sapporo	4-1	FC Tokyo	Sapporo Atsubetsu Park Stadium
JST (UTC+09)

5 September 1999 24	FC Tokyo	0-0 (GG) (a.e.t.)	Kawasaki Frontale	Nishigaoka Soccer Stadium
JST (UTC+09)

10 September 1999 25	Ventforet Kofu	3-5	FC Tokyo	Nirasaki Central Park Stadium
JST (UTC+09)

15 September 1999 26	FC Tokyo	1-0	Omiya Ardija	Nishigaoka Soccer Stadium
JST (UTC+09)

19 September 1999 27	Vegalta Sendai	1-3	FC Tokyo	Sendai Stadium
JST (UTC+09)

25 September 1999 28	FC Tokyo	4-2	Oita Trinita	Komazawa Olympic Park Stadium
JST (UTC+09)

3 October 1999 29	Montedio Yamagata	2-1	FC Tokyo	Yamagata City Athletic Stadium
JST (UTC+09)

11 October 1999 30	FC Tokyo	0-1	Sagan Tosu	Nishigaoka Soccer Stadium
JST (UTC+09)

17 October 1999 31	FC Tokyo	0-1	Consadole Sapporo	Edogawa Stadium
JST (UTC+09)

24 October 1999 32	Kawasaki Frontale	3-2	FC Tokyo	Todoroki Athletics Stadium
JST (UTC+09)

30 October 1999 33	FC Tokyo	2-0	Ventforet Kofu	Komazawa Olympic Park Stadium
JST (UTC+09)

8 November 1999 34	Omiya Ardija	1-0 (GG) (a.e.t.)	FC Tokyo	Omiya Football Stadium
JST (UTC+09)

14 November 1999 35	FC Tokyo	0-1	Vegalta Sendai	Komazawa Olympic Park Stadium
JST (UTC+09)

21 November 1999 36	Albirex Niigata	0-1	FC Tokyo	Niigata City Athletic Stadium
JST (UTC+09)

=== Emperor's Cup ===
28 November 1999 1st Round	Kusatsu Higashi High School	0-2	FC Tokyo	Ojiyama Stadium
JST (UTC+09)

5 December 1999 2nd Round	FC Tokyo	6-0	Hatsushiba Hashimoto High School	Nishigaoka Soccer Stadium
JST (UTC+09)

12 December 1999 3rd Round	Bellmare Hiratsuka	3-4 (GG) (a.e.t.)	FC Tokyo	Hiratsuka Athletics Stadium
JST (UTC+09)

19 December 1999 4th Round	Júbilo Iwata	3-0	FC Tokyo	Kagoshima Kamoike Stadium
JST (UTC+09)

=== J.League Cup ===
7 April 1999 1st Round-1	FC Tokyo	1-1	Vissel Kobe	Nishigaoka Soccer Stadium
JST (UTC+09)

14 April 1999 1st Round-2	Vissel Kobe	1-2 (GG) (a.e.t.) (2-3 agg.)	FC Tokyo	Kobe Universiade Memorial Stadium
JST (UTC+09)

12 June 1999 2nd Round-1	FC Tokyo	1-2	JEF United Ichihara	Nishigaoka Soccer Stadium
JST (UTC+09)

19 June 1999 2nd Round-2	JEF United Ichihara	1-4 (3-5 agg.)	FC Tokyo	Ichihara Seaside Stadium
JST (UTC+09)

20 July 1999 Quarterfinals-1	Yokohama F. Marinos	0-3	FC Tokyo	International Stadium Yokohama
JST (UTC+09)

24 July 1999 Quarterfinals-2	FC Tokyo	0-2 (3-2 agg.)	Yokohama F. Marinos	Edogawa Stadium
JST (UTC+09)

29 September 1999 Semifinals-1	Kashima Antlers	2-0	FC Tokyo	Kashima Soccer Stadium
JST (UTC+09)

6 October 1999 Semifinals-2	FC Tokyo	1-1 (1-3 agg.)	Kashima Antlers	Tokyo National Stadium
JST (UTC+09)

== Player statistics ==
No.	Pos.	Nat.	Player	D.o.B. (Age)	Height / Weight	J.League 2		Emperor's Cup		J.League Cup		Total	
No.	Pos.	Nat.	Player	D.o.B. (Age)	Height / Weight	Apps	Goals	Apps	Goals	Apps	Goals	Apps	Goals
1	GK	(Japan)	Hiromitsu Horiike	May 24, 1971 (aged 27)	cm / kg	16	0	0	0	4	0	20	0
2	DF	(Japan)	Takeshi Aoi	August 5, 1977 (aged 21)	cm / kg	0	0						
3	DF	(Brazil)	Sandro	May 19, 1973 (aged 25)	cm / kg	36	3	4	0	7	1	47	4
4	DF	(Japan)	Mitsunori Yamao	April 13, 1973 (aged 25)	cm / kg	2	0	2	0	4	0	8	0
5	DF	(Japan)	Yoshinori Furube	December 9, 1970 (aged 28)	cm / kg	14	2	1	0	3	0	18	2
6	MF	(Japan)	Hiroki Shinjo	April 28, 1973 (aged 25)	cm / kg	26	0	1	0	3	0	30	0
7	MF	(Japan)	Satoru Asari	June 10, 1974 (aged 24)	cm / kg	29	1	3	0	7	0	39	1
8	DF	(Japan)	Ryuji Fujiyama	June 9, 1973 (aged 25)	cm / kg	35	1	4	0	8	0	47	1
9	FW	(Japan)	Jun Wada	November 28, 1973 (aged 25)	cm / kg	18	0	0	0	4	0	22	0
10	MF	(Japan)	Takashi Okuhara	July 31, 1972 (aged 26)	cm / kg	7	1	3	1	1	0	11	2
11	FW	(Brazil)	Amaral	October 16, 1966 (aged 32)	cm / kg	26	15	3	2	8	2	37	19
12	DF	(Japan)	Osamu Umeyama	August 16, 1973 (aged 25)	cm / kg	32	0	4	0	7	0	43	0
13	MF	(Japan)	Kensuke Kagami	November 21, 1974 (aged 24)	cm / kg	21	4	1	0	2	2	24	6
14	MF	(Japan)	Yukihiko Sato	May 11, 1976 (aged 22)	cm / kg	35	6	4	2	7	2	46	10
15	MF	(Brazil)	Almir	May 11, 1973 (aged 25)	cm / kg	33	8	4	4	6	0	43	12
16	MF	(Japan)	Toshiki Koike	November 10, 1974 (aged 24)	cm / kg	22	1	1	0	5	0	28	1
17	FW	(Japan)	Toru Kaburagi	April 18, 1976 (aged 22)	cm / kg	30	3	3	0	6	3	39	6
18	MF	(Japan)	Hayato Okamoto	October 16, 1974 (aged 24)	cm / kg	28	3	4	2	7	0	39	5
19	DF	(Japan)	Makoto Kita	May 30, 1976 (aged 22)	cm / kg	0	0						
20	DF	(Japan)	Osamu Matsumoto	August 15, 1977 (aged 21)	cm / kg	0	0						
21	GK	(Japan)	Taishi Endo	March 31, 1980 (aged 18)	cm / kg	0	0	1	0	0	0	1	0
22	GK	(Japan)	Takayuki Suzuki	October 4, 1973 (aged 25)	cm / kg	21	0	4	0	4	0	29	0
23	MF	(Japan)	Takuya Sato	July 19, 1978 (aged 20)	cm / kg	0	0	1	0	0	0	1	0
24	MF	(Japan)	Masamitsu Kobayashi	April 13, 1978 (aged 20)	cm / kg	20	2	0	0	7	2	27	4
25	MF	(Japan)	Junichi Okamoto	June 28, 1978 (aged 20)	cm / kg	0	0						
26	DF	(Japan)	Takayuki Komine	April 25, 1974 (aged 24)	cm / kg	34	0	3	0	4	0	41	0
27	FW	(Japan)	Masatoshi Matsuda	September 4, 1980 (aged 18)	cm / kg	0	0						
28	FW	(Japan)	Jun Enomoto	May 13, 1977 (aged 21)	cm / kg	8	0						
29	DF	(Japan)	Shinichi Kawase	June 18, 1976 (aged 22)	cm / kg	0	0						
30	DF	(Japan)	Minoru Kobayashi	May 14, 1976 (aged 22)	cm / kg	0	0						
31	GK	(Japan)	Kazuaki Hayashi	July 29, 1976 (aged 22)	cm / kg	0	0						
32	GK	(Japan)	Hiroyuki Nitao	November 27, 1973 (aged 25)	cm / kg	0	0						

== Other pages ==
- (in Japanese) J.League official site
