= 2000 FC Tokyo season =

F.C. Tokyo
2000 season
- Chairman: Hiroshi Nomoto
- Manager: Kiyoshi Okuma
- Stadium: Tokyo National Stadium
- J.League 1: 7th
- Emperor's Cup: 3rd Round
- J.League Cup: 2nd Round
- Top goalscorer: Tuto (17)
- Average home league attendance: 11,807
Home colours	Away colours

2000 F.C. Tokyo season

== Competitions ==
Competitions	Position
J.League 1	7th / 16 clubs
Emperor's Cup	3rd Round
J.League Cup	2nd Round

== Domestic results ==
=== J.League 1 ===
11 March 2000 1-1	Yokohama F. Marinos	0-1	F.C. Tokyo	International Stadium Yokohama
JST (UTC+09)

18 March 2000 1-2	F.C. Tokyo	2-0	Avispa Fukuoka	Tokyo National Stadium
JST (UTC+09)

25 March 2000 1-3	F.C. Tokyo	2-1 (GG) (a.e.t.)	Nagoya Grampus Eight	Tokyo National Stadium
JST (UTC+09)

1 April 2000 1-4	Kashiwa Reysol	3-2 (GG) (a.e.t.)	F.C. Tokyo	Kashiwanoha Park Stadium
JST (UTC+09)

5 April 2000 1-5	F.C. Tokyo	3-2	Júbilo Iwata	Tokyo National Stadium
JST (UTC+09)

8 April 2000 1-6	Kashima Antlers	2-1	F.C. Tokyo	Toyama Athletic Stadium
JST (UTC+09)

15 April 2000 1-7	F.C. Tokyo	1-3	Gamba Osaka	Tokyo National Stadium
JST (UTC+09)

22 April 2000 1-8	Sanfrecce Hiroshima	0-1	F.C. Tokyo	Hiroshima Big Arch
JST (UTC+09)

29 April 2000 1-9	F.C. Tokyo	3-0	Kyoto Purple Sanga	Kagoshima Kamoike Stadium
JST (UTC+09)

3 May 2000 1-10	Shimizu S-Pulse	2-1	F.C. Tokyo	Nihondaira Sports Stadium
JST (UTC+09)

6 May 2000 1-11	F.C. Tokyo	2-1	Kawasaki Frontale	Komazawa Olympic Park Stadium
JST (UTC+09)

13 May 2000 1-12	F.C. Tokyo	1-2	Cerezo Osaka	Tokyo National Stadium
JST (UTC+09)

17 May 2000 1-13	JEF United Ichihara	1-3	F.C. Tokyo	Ichihara Seaside Stadium
JST (UTC+09)

20 May 2000 1-14	F.C. Tokyo	1-2	Vissel Kobe	Tokyo National Stadium
JST (UTC+09)

27 May 2000 1-15	Verdy Kawasaki	3-0	F.C. Tokyo	Todoroki Athletics Stadium
JST (UTC+09)

24 June 2000 2-1	F.C. Tokyo	3-0	Yokohama F. Marinos	Tokyo National Stadium
JST (UTC+09)

1 July 2000 2-2	Avispa Fukuoka	1-2 (GG) (a.e.t.)	F.C. Tokyo	Hakatanomori Football Stadium
JST (UTC+09)

8 July 2000 2-3	Kawasaki Frontale	0-3	F.C. Tokyo	Tokyo National Stadium
JST (UTC+09)

15 July 2000 2-4	F.C. Tokyo	2-0	Shimizu S-Pulse	Kagawa Marugame Stadium
JST (UTC+09)

22 July 2000 2-5	Kyoto Purple Sanga	0-3	F.C. Tokyo	Nishikyogoku Athletic Stadium
JST (UTC+09)

26 July 2000 2-6	F.C. Tokyo	1-2	Sanfrecce Hiroshima	Tokyo National Stadium
JST (UTC+09)

29 July 2000 2-7	Gamba Osaka	2-1 (GG) (a.e.t.)	F.C. Tokyo	Osaka Expo '70 Stadium
JST (UTC+09)

5 August 2000 2-8	F.C. Tokyo	0-2	Kashiwa Reysol	Ishikawa Kanazawa Stadium
JST (UTC+09)

12 August 2000 2-9	Nagoya Grampus Eight	4-1	F.C. Tokyo	Mizuho Athletic Stadium
JST (UTC+09)

19 August 2000 2-10	F.C. Tokyo	1-1 (GG) (a.e.t.)	Kashima Antlers	Tokyo National Stadium
JST (UTC+09)

8 November 2000 2-11	Júbilo Iwata	2-0	F.C. Tokyo	Júbilo Iwata Stadium
JST (UTC+09)

11 November 2000 2-12	F.C. Tokyo	2-3	Verdy Kawasaki	Komazawa Olympic Park Stadium
JST (UTC+09)

18 November 2000 2-13	Vissel Kobe	1-0	F.C. Tokyo	Kobe Universiade Memorial Stadium
JST (UTC+09)

23 November 2000 2-14	F.C. Tokyo	1-0 (GG) (a.e.t.)	JEF United Ichihara	Tokyo National Stadium
JST (UTC+09)

26 November 2000 2-15	Cerezo Osaka	1-3	F.C. Tokyo	Osaka Nagai Second Stadium
JST (UTC+09)

=== Emperor's Cup ===
1st Round	bye

2nd Round	bye

10 December 2000 3rd Round	F.C. Tokyo	0-1	Ventforet Kofu	Nishigaoka Soccer Stadium
JST (UTC+09)

=== J.League Cup ===
1st Round	bye

5 July 2000 2nd Round-1	Kyoto Purple Sanga	1-1	F.C. Tokyo	Nishikyogoku Athletic Stadium
JST (UTC+09)

12 July 2000 2nd Round-2	F.C. Tokyo	0-1 (1-2 agg.)	Kyoto Purple Sanga	Edogawa Stadium
JST (UTC+09)

== Player statistics ==
No.	Pos.	Nat.	Player	D.o.B. (Age)	Height / Weight	J.League 1		Emperor's Cup		J.League Cup		Total	
No.	Pos.	Nat.	Player	D.o.B. (Age)	Height / Weight	Apps	Goals	Apps	Goals	Apps	Goals	Apps	Goals
1	GK	(Japan)	Hiromitsu Horiike	May 24, 1971 (aged 28)	cm / kg	1	0	1	0	0	0	2	0
2	DF	(Japan)	Naruyuki Naito	November 9, 1967 (aged 32)	cm / kg	27	1	1	0	2	0	30	1
3	DF	(Brazil)	Sandro	May 19, 1973 (aged 26)	cm / kg	29	0	1	0	2	0	32	0
4	DF	(Japan)	Mitsunori Yamao	April 13, 1973 (aged 26)	cm / kg	7	0	0	0	0	0	7	0
5	DF	(Japan)	Yoshinori Furube	December 9, 1970 (aged 29)	cm / kg	2	0	1	0	0	0	3	0
6	MF	(Japan)	Tetsuya Asano	February 23, 1967 (aged 33)	cm / kg	8	0	0	0	0	0	8	0
7	MF	(Japan)	Satoru Asari	June 10, 1974 (aged 25)	cm / kg	27	0	0	0	1	0	28	0
8	DF	(Japan)	Ryuji Fujiyama	June 9, 1973 (aged 26)	cm / kg	30	0	1	0	2	0	33	0
9	FW	(Brazil)	Tuto	July 2, 1978 (aged 21)	cm / kg	29	17	1	0	2	1	32	18
10	MF	(Japan)	Kensuke Kagami	November 21, 1974 (aged 25)	cm / kg	3	1	0	0	0	0	3	1
11	FW	(Brazil)	Amaral	October 16, 1966 (aged 33)	cm / kg	22	13	1	0	2	0	25	13
12	DF	(Japan)	Osamu Umeyama	August 16, 1973 (aged 26)	cm / kg	1	0	0	0	0	0	1	0
13	DF	(Japan)	Koji Maeda	February 3, 1969 (aged 31)	cm / kg	0	0						
13	MF	(Japan)	Tadatoshi Masuda	December 25, 1973 (aged 26)	cm / kg	13	1	1	0	2	0	16	1
14	MF	(Japan)	Yukihiko Sato	May 11, 1976 (aged 23)	cm / kg	28	5	0	0	2	0	30	5
15	FW	(Japan)	Takuya Jinno	June 1, 1970 (aged 29)	cm / kg	18	4	0	0	2	0	20	4
16	MF	(Japan)	Toshiki Koike	November 10, 1974 (aged 25)	cm / kg	27	2	1	0	2	0	30	2
17	FW	(Japan)	Toru Kaburagi	April 18, 1976 (aged 23)	cm / kg	7	0	1	0	0	0	8	0
18	MF	(Japan)	Hayato Okamoto	October 16, 1974 (aged 25)	cm / kg	1	0	0	0	0	0	1	0
19	DF	(Japan)	Makoto Kita	May 30, 1976 (aged 23)	cm / kg	0	0						
20	GK	(Japan)	Yoichi Doi	July 25, 1973 (aged 26)	cm / kg	30	0	0	0	2	0	32	0
21	GK	(Japan)	Taishi Endo	March 31, 1980 (aged 19)	cm / kg	0	0						
22	GK	(Japan)	Takayuki Suzuki	October 4, 1973 (aged 26)	cm / kg	0	0						
23	MF	(Japan)	Tetsuhiro Kina	December 10, 1976 (aged 23)	cm / kg	22	0	1	0	1	0	24	0
24	MF	(Japan)	Masamitsu Kobayashi	April 13, 1978 (aged 21)	cm / kg	27	2	1	0	2	0	30	2
25	DF	(Japan)	Shinya Sakoi	May 8, 1977 (aged 22)	cm / kg	4	0	1	0	2	0	7	0
26	DF	(Japan)	Takayuki Komine	April 25, 1974 (aged 25)	cm / kg	30	0	1	0	2	0	33	0
27	FW	(Japan)	Masatoshi Matsuda	September 4, 1980 (aged 19)	cm / kg	1	0	0	0	0	0	1	0
28	FW	(Japan)	Jun Enomoto	May 13, 1977 (aged 22)	cm / kg	1	0						
29	FW	(Japan)	Mitsuhiro Toda	September 10, 1977 (aged 22)	cm / kg	14	0	1	0	0	0	15	0
30	DF	(Japan)	Minoru Kobayashi	May 14, 1976 (aged 23)	cm / kg	0	0						
31	MF	(Japan)	Daisuke Hoshi	December 10, 1980 (aged 19)	cm / kg	0	0						
32	FW	(Japan)	Arata Kasagi	June 21, 1980 (aged 19)	cm / kg	0	0						
33	DF	(Japan)	Hikaru Mita	August 1, 1981 (aged 18)	cm / kg	0	0						
