= Okuhara =

Okuhara (written: 奥原) is a Japanese surname. Notable people with the surname include:

- Nozomi Okuhara (奥原 希望, born 1995), Japanese badminton player
- Okuhara Seiko (奥原 晴湖, 1837–1913), Japanese painter
- Takashi Okuhara (奥原 崇, born 1972), Japanese footballer
