= Hayato Okamoto (footballer) =

Japanese footballer

Hayato Okamoto 岡元 勇人
Personal information
- Full name: Hayato Okamoto
- Date of birth: October 16, 1974 (age 52)
- Place of birth: Izumo, Shimane, Japan
- Height: 1.76 m (5 ft 9 1/2 in)
- Position: Midfielder

Youth career
- 1990–1992: Izumo Technical High School

Senior career*
Years	Team	Apps	(Gls)
1993–2000	FC Tokyo	157	(45)
2001–2002	Yokogawa Electric	24	(7)
Total		181	(52)
- * Club domestic league appearances and goals

Hayato Okamoto (岡元 勇人, Okamoto Hayato; born October 16, 1974) is a former Japanese football player.

== Playing career ==
Okamoto was born in Izumo on October 16, 1974. After graduating from high school, he joined Japan Football League club Tokyo Gas (later FC Tokyo) in 1993. He played many matches as left side midfielder from first season. The club results rose year by year and won the champions in 1998. The club was promoted to new league J2 League from 1999. On March 14, 1999, he scored a goal in the 4th minute against Sagan Tosu in opening match in 1999 season. This goal is the first ever J2 League goal. Although he played as regular player, he got hurt in summer and his opportunity to play decreased. Although the club won the 2nd place in 1999 and was promoted to J1 League from 2000, he could only play one match. In 2001, he moved to Japan Football League club Yokogawa Electric. Although he played many matches in 2001, he could not play at all in the match in 2002 and retired in May 2002.

== Career statistics ==
Appearances and goals by club, season and competition
Club	Season	League			Emperor's Cup		J.League Cup		Total	
Club	Season	Division	Apps	Goals	Apps	Goals	Apps	Goals	Apps	Goals
Tokyo Gas	1993	Football League	15	2	—		—		15	2
Tokyo Gas	1994	Football League	26	7	3	0	—		29	7
Tokyo Gas	1995	Football League	21	7	1	0	—		22	7
Tokyo Gas	1996	Football League	23	6	1	0	—		24	6
Tokyo Gas	1997	Football League	20	6	6	4	—		26	10
Tokyo Gas	1998	Football League	23	14	2	1	—		25	15
FC Tokyo	1999	J2 League	28	3	4	2	7	0	39	5
FC Tokyo	2000	J1 League	1	0	0	0	0	0	1	0
Yokogawa Electric	2001	Football League	24	7	0	0	—		24	7
Yokogawa Electric	2002	Football League	0	0	0	0	—		0	0
Career total			181	52	17	7	7	0	205	59
