= Jun Enomoto =

Japanese footballer

Jun Enomoto 榎本 潤
Personal information
- Full name: Jun Enomoto
- Date of birth: 13 May 1977 (age 49)
- Place of birth: Saitama, Japan
- Height: 1.80 m (5 ft 11 in)
- Position: Forward

Youth career
- 1993–1995: Omiya Higashi High School
- 1996–1999: Dokkyo University

Senior career*
Years	Team	Apps	(Gls)
1999–2001	FC Tokyo	10	(1)
Total		10	(1)
- * Club domestic league appearances and goals

Jun Enomoto (榎本 潤, Enomoto Jun; born 13 May 1977) is a former Japanese football player.

== Playing career ==
Enomoto was born in Saitama Prefecture on 13 May 1977. In June 1999, when he was a Dokkyo University student, he joined the J2 League club FC Tokyo. He played many matches as mainly a substitute forward. The club also won second place in 1999 and was promoted to the J1 League in 2000. However he did not play in any matches in 2000 and retired at the end of the 2001 season.

== Career statistics ==
Appearances and goals by club, season and competition
Club	Season	League			Emperor's Cup		J.League Cup		Total	
Club	Season	Division	Apps	Goals	Apps	Goals	Apps	Goals	Apps	Goals
FC Tokyo	1999	J2 League	8	1	3	1	3	0	14	2
FC Tokyo	2000	J1 League	1	0	0	0	0	0	1	0
FC Tokyo	2001	J1 League	1	0	0	0	0	0	1	0
Career total			10	1	3	1	3	0	16	2
