= Mitsunori Yamao =

Japanese footballer

Mitsunori Yamao 山尾 光則
Personal information
- Full name: Mitsunori Yamao
- Date of birth: April 13, 1973 (age 53)
- Place of birth: Nagoya, Japan
- Height: 1.78 m (5 ft 10 in)
- Position: Defender

Youth career
- 1992–1995: Aichi Gakuin University

Senior career*
Years	Team	Apps	(Gls)
1996	Nagoya Grampus Eight	0	(0)
1997–1998	Ventforet Kofu	54	(4)
1999–2002	FC Tokyo	16	(0)
2002	Cerezo Osaka	17	(0)
2003–2005	Yokohama FC	108	(3)
Total		195	(7)
Medal record
Nagoya Grampus Eight
Runner-up	J1 League	1996
- * Club domestic league appearances and goals

Mitsunori Yamao (山尾 光則, Yamao Mitsunori; born April 13, 1973) is a former Japanese football player.

== Playing career ==
Yamao was born in Nagoya on April 13, 1973. After graduating from Aichi Gakuin University, he joined his local club Nagoya Grampus Eight in 1996. However he could not play at all in the match. In 1997, he moved to Japan Football League club Ventforet Kofu. He played as regular player as center back in 2 seasons. In 1999, he moved to newly was promoted to J2 League club, FC Tokyo. The club was promoted to J1 League from 2000. Although he played as center back, he could not play many matches. In May 2002, he moved to J2 club Cerezo Osaka. He played many matches and the club was promoted to J1. In 2003, he moved to J2 club Yokohama FC. He played as regular player as center back in 3 seasons. He retired at the end of the 2005 season.

== Career statistics ==
Appearances and goals by club, season and competition
Club	Season	League			Emperor's Cup		J.League Cup		Total	
Club	Season	Division	Apps	Goals	Apps	Goals	Apps	Goals	Apps	Goals
Nagoya Grampus Eight	1996	J1 League	0	0	0	0	0	0	0	0
Ventforet Kofu	1997	Football League	26	2	3	0	—		29	2
Ventforet Kofu	1998	Football League	28	2	4	0	—		32	2
FC Tokyo	1999	J2 League	2	0	2	0	4	0	8	0
FC Tokyo	2000	J1 League	7	0	0	0	0	0	7	0
FC Tokyo	2001	J1 League	7	0	1	0	0	0	8	0
FC Tokyo	2002	J1 League	0	0	0	0	1	0	1	0
Cerezo Osaka	2002	J2 League	17	0	0	0	—		17	0
Yokohama FC	2003	J2 League	38	1	3	0	—		41	1
Yokohama FC	2004	J2 League	39	1	3	1	—		42	2
Yokohama FC	2005	J2 League	31	1	0	0	—		31	1
Career total			195	7	16	1	5	0	216	8
