= 2001 FC Tokyo season =

FC Tokyo
2001 season
- Chairman: Masahiro Tsubahara
- Manager: Kiyoshi Okuma
- Stadium: Tokyo Stadium
- J.League 1: 8th
- Emperor's Cup: 3rd Round
- J.League Cup: 2nd Round
- Top goalscorer: Amaral (17)
- Average home league attendance: 22,313
Home colours	Away colours

2001 FC Tokyo season

== Competitions ==
Competitions	Position
J.League 1	8th / 16 clubs
Emperor's Cup	3rd round
J.League Cup	2nd round

== Domestic results ==
=== J.League 1 ===
10 March 2001 1-1	FC Tokyo	2-1 (GG) (a.e.t.)	Tokyo Verdy 1969	Tokyo Stadium
JST (UTC+09)

17 March 2001 1-2	Vissel Kobe	2-0	FC Tokyo	Kobe Universiade Memorial Stadium
JST (UTC+09)

31 March 2001 1-3	Júbilo Iwata	1-0	FC Tokyo	Júbilo Iwata Stadium
JST (UTC+09)

7 April 2001 1-4	FC Tokyo	0-1	Nagoya Grampus Eight	Tokyo Stadium
JST (UTC+09)

14 April 2001 1-5	Urawa Red Diamonds	1-3	FC Tokyo	Urawa Komaba Stadium
JST (UTC+09)

29 April 2001 1-6	FC Tokyo	0-3	JEF United Ichihara	Tokyo Stadium
JST (UTC+09)

3 May 2001 1-7	Sanfrecce Hiroshima	3-0	FC Tokyo	Hiroshima Big Arch
JST (UTC+09)

6 May 2001 1-8	FC Tokyo	2-1	Consadole Sapporo	Kagawa Marugame Stadium
JST (UTC+09)

12 May 2001 1-9	Kashiwa Reysol	0-2	FC Tokyo	Hitachi Kashiwa Soccer Stadium
JST (UTC+09)

19 May 2001 1-10	FC Tokyo	1-2	Avispa Fukuoka	Tokyo Stadium
JST (UTC+09)

16 June 2001 1-11	Yokohama F. Marinos	0-2	FC Tokyo	International Stadium Yokohama
JST (UTC+09)

23 June 2001 1-12	Cerezo Osaka	1-2 (GG) (a.e.t.)	FC Tokyo	Osaka Nagai Stadium
JST (UTC+09)

7 July 2001 1-13	FC Tokyo	2-0	Kashima Antlers	Tokyo Stadium
JST (UTC+09)

14 July 2001 1-14	FC Tokyo	0-2	Gamba Osaka	Tokyo Stadium
JST (UTC+09)

21 July 2001 1-15	Shimizu S-Pulse	1-2 (GG) (a.e.t.)	FC Tokyo	Nihondaira Sports Stadium
JST (UTC+09)

11 August 2001 2-1	FC Tokyo	2-2 (GG) (a.e.t.)	Kashiwa Reysol	Tokyo Stadium
JST (UTC+09)

18 August 2001 2-2	Consadole Sapporo	2-5	FC Tokyo	Sapporo Dome
JST (UTC+09)

25 August 2001 2-3	FC Tokyo	1-2 (GG) (a.e.t.)	Shimizu S-Pulse	Tokyo Stadium
JST (UTC+09)

8 September 2001 2-4	Gamba Osaka	1-2	FC Tokyo	Osaka Expo '70 Stadium
JST (UTC+09)

15 September 2001 2-5	FC Tokyo	3-2	Sanfrecce Hiroshima	Tokyo Stadium
JST (UTC+09)

22 September 2001 2-6	JEF United Ichihara	2-2 (GG) (a.e.t.)	FC Tokyo	Matsumotodaira Football Stadium
JST (UTC+09)

29 September 2001 2-7	FC Tokyo	3-2	Urawa Red Diamonds	Tokyo Stadium
JST (UTC+09)

13 October 2001 2-8	Nagoya Grampus Eight	1-1 (GG) (a.e.t.)	FC Tokyo	Toyota Stadium
JST (UTC+09)

17 October 2001 2-9	FC Tokyo	2-5	Júbilo Iwata	Tokyo National Stadium
JST (UTC+09)

20 October 2001 2-10	Avispa Fukuoka	1-0	FC Tokyo	Hakatanomori Football Stadium
JST (UTC+09)

31 October 2001 2-11	FC Tokyo	1-1 (GG) (a.e.t.)	Yokohama F. Marinos	Tokyo Stadium
JST (UTC+09)

3 November 2001 2-12	FC Tokyo	5-2	Cerezo Osaka	Tokyo Stadium
JST (UTC+09)

10 November 2001 2-13	Kashima Antlers	3-1	FC Tokyo	Kashima Soccer Stadium
JST (UTC+09)

17 November 2001 2-14	FC Tokyo	1-1 (GG) (a.e.t.)	Vissel Kobe	Tokyo Stadium
JST (UTC+09)

24 November 2001 2-15	Tokyo Verdy 1969	1-0	FC Tokyo	Tokyo Stadium
JST (UTC+09)

=== Emperor's Cup ===
1st Round	bye

2nd Round	bye

9 December 2001 3rd Round	FC Tokyo	0-1	Yokohama FC	Tokyo Stadium
JST (UTC+09)

=== J.League Cup ===
4 April 2001 1st Round-1	FC Tokyo	5-0	Ventforet Kofu	Tokyo Stadium
JST (UTC+09)

18 April 2001 1st Round-2	Ventforet Kofu	0-1 (0-6 agg.)	FC Tokyo	Kose Sports Park Stadium
JST (UTC+09)

13 June 2001 2nd Round-1	Sanfrecce Hiroshima	3-3	FC Tokyo	Hiroshima Stadium
JST (UTC+09)

20 June 2001 2nd Round-2	FC Tokyo	1-2 (GG) (a.e.t.) (4-5 agg.)	Sanfrecce Hiroshima	Tokyo Stadium
JST (UTC+09)

== Player statistics ==
No.	Pos.	Nat.	Player	D.o.B. (Age)	Height / Weight	J.League 1		Emperor's Cup		J.League Cup		Total	
No.	Pos.	Nat.	Player	D.o.B. (Age)	Height / Weight	Apps	Goals	Apps	Goals	Apps	Goals	Apps	Goals
1	GK	(Japan)	Yoichi Doi	July 25, 1973 (aged 27)	cm / kg	30	0	1	0	3	0	34	0
2	DF	(Japan)	Naruyuki Naito	November 9, 1967 (aged 33)	cm / kg	11	0	0	0	2	0	13	0
3	DF	(Brazil)	Sandro	May 19, 1973 (aged 27)	cm / kg	29	0	0	0	4	0	33	0
4	DF	(Japan)	Mitsunori Yamao	April 13, 1973 (aged 27)	cm / kg	7	0	1	0	0	0	8	0
5	MF	(Japan)	Takahiro Shimotaira	December 18, 1971 (aged 29)	cm / kg	16	0	0	0	3	0	19	0
6	DF	(Japan)	Takayuki Komine	April 25, 1974 (aged 26)	cm / kg	25	0	1	0	3	0	29	0
7	MF	(Japan)	Satoru Asari	June 10, 1974 (aged 26)	cm / kg	25	0	0	0	3	0	28	0
8	DF	(Japan)	Ryuji Fujiyama	June 9, 1973 (aged 27)	cm / kg	30	0	0	0	4	0	34	0
9	FW	(Japan)	Wagner Lopes	January 29, 1969 (aged 32)	cm / kg	10	3	0	0	2	4	12	7
9	FW	(Japan)	Kenji Fukuda	October 21, 1977 (aged 23)	cm / kg	11	1	1	0	0	0	12	1
10	MF	(Japan)	Fumitake Miura	August 12, 1970 (aged 30)	cm / kg	27	3	1	0	1	1	29	4
11	FW	(Brazil)	Amaral	October 16, 1966 (aged 34)	cm / kg	25	17	0	0	2	0	27	17
12	DF	(Japan)	Osamu Umeyama	August 16, 1973 (aged 27)	cm / kg	3	0	1	0	2	0	6	0
13	MF	(Japan)	Kensuke Kagami	November 21, 1974 (aged 26)	cm / kg	14	3	1	0	3	1	18	4
14	MF	(Japan)	Yukihiko Sato	May 11, 1976 (aged 24)	cm / kg	28	3	0	0	2	0	30	3
15	DF	(Japan)	Tetsuya Ito	October 1, 1970 (aged 30)	cm / kg	23	1	0	0	3	0	26	1
16	MF	(Japan)	Toshiki Koike	November 10, 1974 (aged 26)	cm / kg	0	0						
17	FW	(Japan)	Toru Kaburagi	April 18, 1976 (aged 24)	cm / kg	9	1	0	0	1	0	10	1
18	MF	(Japan)	Tadatoshi Masuda	December 25, 1973 (aged 27)	cm / kg	10	0	1	0	2	0	13	0
19	MF	(Brazil)	Kelly	April 28, 1975 (aged 25)	cm / kg	26	9	1	0	4	2	31	11
20	DF	(Japan)	Shinya Sakoi	May 8, 1977 (aged 23)	cm / kg	0	0						
21	GK	(Japan)	Taishi Endo	March 31, 1980 (aged 20)	cm / kg	0	0						
22	GK	(Japan)	Hideaki Ozawa	March 17, 1974 (aged 26)	cm / kg	1	0	0	0	1	0	2	0
23	MF	(Japan)	Tetsuhiro Kina	December 10, 1976 (aged 24)	cm / kg	23	0	1	0	3	0	27	0
24	MF	(Japan)	Masamitsu Kobayashi	April 13, 1978 (aged 22)	cm / kg	20	1	1	0	3	2	24	3
25	MF	(Japan)	Masashi Miyazawa	April 24, 1978 (aged 22)	cm / kg	1	0	1	0	3	0	5	0
26	MF	(Japan)	Kazuyoshi Suwazono	March 4, 1983 (aged 18)	cm / kg	0	0						
27	FW	(Japan)	Masatoshi Matsuda	September 4, 1980 (aged 20)	cm / kg	1	0	0	0	0	0	1	0
28	FW	(Japan)	Jun Enomoto	May 13, 1977 (aged 23)	cm / kg	1	0						
29	FW	(Japan)	Mitsuhiro Toda	September 10, 1977 (aged 23)	cm / kg	12	2	1	0	3	0	16	2
30	DF	(Japan)	Minoru Kobayashi	May 14, 1976 (aged 24)	cm / kg	3	0	1	0	0	0	4	0
31	GK	(Japan)	Go Kaburaki	August 26, 1977 (aged 23)	cm / kg	0	0						
32	MF	(Japan)	Masanori Ito	April 20, 1978 (aged 22)	cm / kg	0	0						
33	DF	(Japan)	Hikaru Mita	August 1, 1981 (aged 19)	cm / kg	0	0						
