= Hiroki Shinjo =

Japanese footballer

Hiroki Shinjo 新條 宏喜
Personal information
- Full name: Hiroki Shinjo
- Date of birth: April 28, 1973 (age 53)
- Place of birth: Kunitachi, Tokyo, Japan
- Height: 1.78 m (5 ft 10 in)
- Position: Midfielder

Youth career
- 1989–1991: Horikoshi High School
- 1992–1995: Chuo University

Senior career*
| Years | Team | Apps | (Gls) |
| 1996–1999 | FC Tokyo | 110 | (6) |
| Total | | 110 | (6) |
- * Club domestic league appearances and goals

Hiroki Shinjo (新條 宏喜, Shinjo Hiroki; born April 28, 1973) is a former Japanese football player.

== Playing career ==
Shinjo was born in Kunitachi on April 28, 1973. After graduating from Chuo University, he joined Japan Football League club Tokyo Gas (later FC Tokyo) in 1996. He became a regular player as right side back from first season. From 1997, he was converted to defensive midfielder and played many matches for the position with Satoru Asari. The club results rose year by year and won the champions in 1998. The club was promoted to new league J2 League from 1999. However his opportunity to play decreased in 1999. Although the club won the 2nd place in 1999 and was promoted to J1 League from 2000, he retired end of 1999 season without playing J1.

== Career statistics ==
Appearances and goals by club, season and competition
| Club | Season | League | | | Emperor's Cup | | J.League Cup | | Total | |
| Club | Season | Division | Apps | Goals | Apps | Goals | Apps | Goals | Apps | Goals |
|---|---|---|---|---|---|---|---|---|---|---|
| Tokyo Gas | 1996 | Football League | 30 | 3 | 3 | 0 | — | | 33 | 3 |
| Tokyo Gas | 1997 | Football League | 28 | 3 | 6 | 1 | — | | 34 | 4 |
| Tokyo Gas | 1998 | Football League | 26 | 0 | 3 | 2 | — | | 29 | 2 |
| FC Tokyo | 1999 | J2 League | 26 | 0 | 1 | 0 | 3 | 0 | 30 | 0 |
| Career total | | | 110 | 6 | 13 | 3 | 3 | 0 | 126 | 9 |
