= Minoru Kobayashi =

Japanese footballer and manager

Minoru Kobayashi 小林 稔
Personal information
- Full name: Minoru Kobayashi
- Date of birth: May 14, 1976 (age 50)
- Place of birth: Ayase, Kanagawa, Japan
- Height: 1.70 m (5 ft 7 in)
- Position: Defender

Youth career
- 1992–1994: Toko Gakuen High School
- 1995–1998: Kokushikan University

Senior career*
Years	Team	Apps	(Gls)
1999–2002	FC Tokyo	11	(0)
Total		11	(0)

Managerial career
- 2019: Júbilo Iwata
- * Club domestic league appearances and goals

Minoru Kobayashi (小林 稔, Kobayashi Minoru; born May 14, 1976) is a former Japanese football player and manager.

== Playing career ==
Kobayashi was born in Ayase on May 14, 1976. After graduating from Kokushikan University, he joined the newly promoted J2 League club, FC Tokyo in 1999. Although the club was promoted to the J1 League in 2000, he did not play that year. He debuted in late 2001 and played several matches as right side back. Although he played as a regular player in early 2002, he was second to Akira Kaji from May 2002 until he retired at the end of the 2002 season.

== Coaching career ==
After the retirement, Kobayashi started coaching career at FC Tokyo in 2005. He mainly coached youth team until 2011. In 2012, he moved to Júbilo Iwata and became a coach for top team. In August 2019, manager Hideto Suzuki resigned for health reasons and Kobayashi became a caretaker manager.

== Career statistics ==
Appearances and goals by club, season and competition
Club	Season	League			Emperor's Cup		J.League Cup		Total	
Club	Season	Division	Apps	Goals	Apps	Goals	Apps	Goals	Apps	Goals
FC Tokyo	1999	J2 League	0	0	0	0	0	0	0	0
FC Tokyo	2000	J1 League	0	0	0	0	0	0	0	0
FC Tokyo	2001	J1 League	3	0	1	0	0	0	4	0
FC Tokyo	2002	J1 League	8	0	0	0	1	0	9	0
Career total			11	0	1	0	1	0	13	0

== Managerial statistics ==
Team	From	To	Record				
Team	From	To	G	W	D	L	Win %
Júbilo Iwata	2019	2019	1	0	1	0	0.00
Total			1	0	1	0	0.00
