= Takayuki Komine =

Japanese footballer

Takayuki Komine 小峯 隆幸
Personal information
- Full name: Takayuki Komine
- Date of birth: April 25, 1974 (age 52)
- Place of birth: Higashimatsuyama, Saitama, Japan
- Height: 1.72 m (5 ft 7 1/2 in)
- Position: Defender

Youth career
- Teikyo High School
- Juntendo University

Senior career*
Years	Team	Apps	(Gls)
1998–2003	FC Tokyo	107	(0)
2003	Vegalta Sendai	8	(0)
2004	Kashiwa Reysol	2	(0)
2005	Tokushima Vortis	23	(0)
2006–2008	FC Gifu	64	(0)
Total		204	(0)
- * Club domestic league appearances and goals

Takayuki Komine (小峯 隆幸, Komine Takayuki; born April 25, 1974) is a Japanese former football player.

== Playing career ==
Komine was born in Higashimatsuyama on April 25, 1974. After graduating from Juntendo University, he joined the Japan Football League club Tokyo Gas (later FC Tokyo) in 1998. During the first season, he played many matches as a center back with Sandro. However, his opportunity to play decreased behind Tetsuya Ito and Teruyuki Moniwa from 2002. In August 2003, he moved to Vegalta Sendai and played many matches. In 2004, he moved to Kashiwa Reysol. However he could hardly play in the match. In 2005, he moved to the J2 club Tokushima Vortis. He played many matches as center back for the first time in four years. In 2006, he moved to the Regional Leagues club FC Gifu. He played many matches over three seasons and the club was promoted to the Japan Football League in 2007 and J2 in 2008. He retired at the end of the 2008 season.

== Club statistics ==
Club performance			League		Cup		League Cup		Total	
Season	Club	League	Apps	Goals	Apps	Goals	Apps	Goals	Apps	Goals
Japan			League		Emperor's Cup		J.League Cup		Total	
1998	Tokyo Gas	Football League	10	0	3	0	-		13	0
1999	FC Tokyo	J2 League	34	0	3	0	4	0	41	0
2000	FC Tokyo	J1 League	30	0	1	0	2	0	33	0
2001	FC Tokyo	J1 League	25	0	1	0	3	0	28	0
2002	FC Tokyo	J1 League	8	0	0	0	2	0	10	0
2003	FC Tokyo	J1 League	0	0	0	0	0	0	0	0
2003	Vegalta Sendai	J1 League	8	0	0	0	-		8	0
2004	Kashiwa Reysol	J1 League	2	0	0	0	2	0	4	0
2005	Tokushima Vortis	J2 League	23	0	1	0	-		24	0
2006	FC Gifu	Regional Leagues	13	0	3	0	-		16	0
2007	FC Gifu	Football League	25	0	1	0	-		26	0
2008	FC Gifu	J2 League	26	0	0	0	-		26	0
Total			204	0	13	0	13	0	230	0
