= Kensuke Kagami =

Japanese footballer

Kensuke Kagami 加賀見 健介
Personal information
- Full name: Kensuke Kagami
- Date of birth: November 21, 1974 (age 51)
- Place of birth: Saitama, Saitama, Japan
- Height: 1.86 m (6 ft 1 in)
- Position: Midfielder

Youth career
- 1990–1992: Toin Gakuen High School
- 1993–1996: Aoyama Gakuin University

Senior career*
Years	Team	Apps	(Gls)
1997–2003	FC Tokyo	75	(17)
2000	→Oita Trinita (loan)	15	(2)
2002	→Kawasaki Frontale (loan)	22	(1)
Total		112	(20)
- * Club domestic league appearances and goals

Kensuke Kagami (加賀見 健介, Kagami Kensuke; born November 21, 1974) is a former Japanese football player.

== Playing career ==
Kagami was born in Saitama on November 21, 1974. After graduating from Aoyama Gakuin University, he joined the Japan Football League club Tokyo Gas (later FC Tokyo) in 1997. He played often as a second striker and the club was promoted to the new J2 League in 1999. Although his opportunity to play decreased in 1999, the club won second place and was promoted to the J1 League in 2000. However he did not play much in 2000. In August 2000, he moved to the J2 club Oita Trinita on loan and played often as a regular player. In 2001, he returned to Tokyo, but played less than Clesly Guimarães (a.k.a. Kelly). In 2002, he moved to the J2 club Kawasaki Frontale on loan. He played as a substitute midfielder. In October 2002, he returned to Tokyo. However he still did not play much and retired at the end of the 2003 season.

== Club statistics ==
Club performance			League		Cup		League Cup		Total	
Season	Club	League	Apps	Goals	Apps	Goals	Apps	Goals	Apps	Goals
Japan			League		Emperor's Cup		J.League Cup		Total	
1997	Tokyo Gas	Football League	10	0	6	1	-		16	1
1998	Tokyo Gas	Football League	27	9	3	0	-		30	9
1999	FC Tokyo	J2 League	21	4	1	0	2	2	24	6
2000	FC Tokyo	J1 League	3	1	0	0	0	0	3	1
2000	Oita Trinita	J2 League	15	2	3	3	0	0	18	5
2001	FC Tokyo	J1 League	14	3	1	0	3	1	18	4
2002	Kawasaki Frontale	J2 League	22	1	0	0	-		22	1
2002	FC Tokyo	J1 League	0	0	0	0	0	0	0	0
2003	FC Tokyo	J1 League	0	0	0	0	0	0	0	0
Total			112	20	14	4	5	3	131	27
