= Hiromitsu Horiike =

Japanese footballer

Hiromitsu Horiike 堀池 洋充
Personal information
- Full name: Hiromitsu Horiike
- Date of birth: May 24, 1971 (age 55)
- Place of birth: Shizuoka, Japan
- Height: 1.75 m (5 ft 9 in)
- Position: Goalkeeper

Youth career
- 1987–1989: Shimizu Higashi High School

College career
Years	Team	Apps	(Gls)
1990–1993	Keio University		

Senior career*
Years	Team	Apps	(Gls)
1994–2000	FC Tokyo	138	(0)
Total		138	(0)
- * Club domestic league appearances and goals

Hiromitsu Horiike (堀池 洋充, Horiike Hiromitsu; born May 24, 1971) is a former Japanese football player.

== Playing career ==
Horiike was born in Shizuoka Prefecture on May 24, 1971. After graduating from Keio University, he joined Japan Football League club Tokyo Gas (later FC Tokyo) in 1994. He played as regular goalkeeper from first season. The club results rose year by year and won the champions in 1998. The club was promoted to new league J2 League from 1999. In 1999 season, although he played as regular goalkeeper for 16 matches in a row from opening match, he injured his shoulder and left the match in 16th match against Consadole Sapporo. After the injury, he could not play at all in the match behind Takayuki Suzuki. The club won the 2nd place in 1999 and was promoted to J1 League from 2000. However the club gained Yoichi Doi and Horiike could hardly play in the match behind Doi. On July 8, he played from the 86th minute as substitute goalkeeper against Kawasaki Frontale. This match was his only match in J1 League and he retired end of 2000 season.

== Career statistics ==
Appearances and goals by club, season and competition
Club	Season	League			Emperor's Cup		J.League Cup		Total	
Club	Season	Division	Apps	Goals	Apps	Goals	Apps	Goals	Apps	Goals
Tokyo Gas	1994	Football League	30	0	3	0	—		33	0
Tokyo Gas	1995	Football League	27	0	1	0	—		28	0
Tokyo Gas	1996	Football League	26	0	1	0	—		27	0
Tokyo Gas	1997	Football League	8	0	6	0	—		14	0
Tokyo Gas	1998	Football League	30	0	3	0	—		33	0
FC Tokyo	1999	J2 League	16	0	0	0	4	0	20	0
FC Tokyo	2000	J1 League	1	0	1	0	0	0	2	0
Career total			138	0	15	0	4	0	157	0
