= Satoru Asari =

Japanese footballer

Satoru Asari 浅利 悟
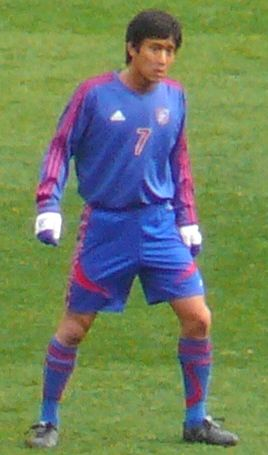

Personal information
- Full name: Satoru Asari
- Date of birth: June 10, 1974 (age 52)
- Place of birth: Saitama, Saitama, Japan
- Height: 1.76 m (5 ft 9 1/2 in)
- Position: Midfielder

Youth career
- 1990–1992: Bunan High School
- 1993–1996: Meiji University

Senior career*
Years	Team	Apps	(Gls)
1997–2009	FC Tokyo	250	(2)
Total		250	(2)
- * Club domestic league appearances and goals

Satoru Asari (浅利 悟, Asari Satoru; born June 10, 1974) is a former Japanese football player.

== Playing career ==
Asari was born in Saitama on June 10, 1974. After graduating from Meiji University, he joined Japan Football League club Tokyo Gas (later FC Tokyo) in 1997. He became a regular player as defensive midfielder from first season. The club also won the 2nd place in 1997 and the champions in 1998 and was promoted to new league J2 League from 1999. In 1999, the club won the 2nd place and was promoted to J1 League from 2000. Although he played many matches for long time, he injured his right knee in August 2004. After the injury, his opportunity to play decreased behind Yasuyuki Konno and Yohei Kajiyama. In 2008, he was appreciated by new manager Hiroshi Jofuku and played many matches. However he could hardly play in the match for injuries in 2009 and retired end of 2009 season.

== Club statistics ==
Club performance			League		Cup		League Cup		Total	
Season	Club	League	Apps	Goals	Apps	Goals	Apps	Goals	Apps	Goals
Japan			League		Emperor's Cup		J.League Cup		Total	
1997	Tokyo Gas	Football League	29	0	4	0	-		33	0
1998	Tokyo Gas	Football League	28	1	3	0	-		31	1
1999	FC Tokyo	J2 League	29	1	3	0	7	0	39	1
2000	FC Tokyo	J1 League	27	0	0	0	1	0	28	0
2001	FC Tokyo	J1 League	25	0	0	0	3	0	28	0
2002	FC Tokyo	J1 League	19	0	1	0	0	0	20	0
2003	FC Tokyo	J1 League	22	0	0	0	6	0	28	0
2004	FC Tokyo	J1 League	9	0	1	0	3	0	13	0
2005	FC Tokyo	J1 League	9	0	0	0	0	0	9	0
2006	FC Tokyo	J1 League	7	0	0	0	0	0	7	0
2007	FC Tokyo	J1 League	16	0	3	0	4	0	23	0
2008	FC Tokyo	J1 League	25	0	1	0	6	0	32	0
2009	FC Tokyo	J1 League	5	0	2	0	1	0	8	0
Career total			250	2	18	0	31	0	299	2

== Honors ==
- J.League Cup : 2004, 2009
