= Osamu Umeyama =

Japanese footballer

Osamu Umeyama 梅山 修
Personal information
- Full name: Osamu Umeyama
- Date of birth: August 16, 1973 (age 53)
- Place of birth: Saitama, Japan
- Height: 1.75 m (5 ft 9 in)
- Position: Defender

Youth career
- 1989–1991: Urawa Gakuin High School

Senior career*
Years	Team	Apps	(Gls)
1992–1993	NKK	18	(0)
1994–1997	Avispa Fukuoka	86	(0)
1998–2001	FC Tokyo	55	(0)
2000	→Verdy Kawasaki (loan)	9	(0)
2002–2003	Shonan Bellmare	75	(0)
2004–2006	Albirex Niigata	46	(0)
Total		289	(0)
- * Club domestic league appearances and goals

Osamu Umeyama (梅山 修, Umeyama Osamu; born August 16, 1973) is a former Japanese football player.

== Playing career ==
Umeyama was born in Saitama on August 16, 1973. After graduating from high school, he joined Japan Football League (JFL) club NKK in 1992. Although he played many matches as right side back, the club was disbanded end of 1993 season. In 1994, he moved to JFL club Fujieda Blux (later Avispa Fukuoka). He became a regular player and the club won the champions in 1995 and was promoted to J1 League from 1996. In 1998, he moved to JFL club Tokyo Gas (later FC Tokyo). He played many matches and the club was promoted to J2 League in 1999 and J1 in 2000. However the club gained Naruyuki Naito in 2000 and Umeyama could hardly play in the match. In June 2000, he moved to Verdy Kawasaki on loan. In 2001, although he returned to FC Tokyo, he could hardly play in the match. In 2002, he moved to J2 club Shonan Bellmare. He played as regular player in 2 seasons. In 2004, he moved to Albirex Niigata. He played many matches in 3 seasons and retired at the end of the 2006 season.

In April 2007, he was elected to Niigata City Council from Nishi-ku, as an independent candidate. He was re-elected in 2011, but lost in 2015. He later became coach of Hokkaido Tokachi Sky Earth.

== Club statistics ==
Club performance			League		Cup		League Cup		Total	
Season	Club	League	Apps	Goals	Apps	Goals	Apps	Goals	Apps	Goals
Japan			League		Emperor's Cup		J.League Cup		Total	
1992	NKK	Football League	8	0	0	0	-		8	0
1993	NKK	Football League	10	0	1	0	-		11	0
1994	Fujieda Blux	Football League	24	0	1	0	-		25	0
1995	Fukuoka Blux	Football League	24	0	1	0	-		25	0
1996	Avispa Fukuoka	J1 League	13	0	1	0	2	0	16	0
1997	Avispa Fukuoka	J1 League	25	0	3	0	1	0	29	0
1998	Tokyo Gas	Football League	19	0	0	0	-		19	0
1999	FC Tokyo	J2 League	32	0	4	0	7	0	43	0
2000	FC Tokyo	J1 League	1	0	0	0	0	0	1	0
2000	Verdy Kawasaki	J1 League	9	0	2	0	4	0	15	0
2001	FC Tokyo	J1 League	3	0	1	0	2	0	6	0
2002	Shonan Bellmare	J2 League	40	0	4	0	-		44	0
2003	Shonan Bellmare	J2 League	35	0	0	0	-		35	0
2004	Albirex Niigata	J1 League	7	0	0	0	4	0	11	0
2005	Albirex Niigata	J1 League	15	0	0	0	0	0	15	0
2006	Albirex Niigata	J1 League	24	0	0	0	3	0	27	0
Career total			289	0	18	0	23	0	330	0
