= Toru Kaburagi =

Japanese footballer

Toru Kaburagi 鏑木 享
Personal information
- Date of birth: April 18, 1976 (age 50)
- Place of birth: Omitama, Japan
- Height: 1.74 m (5 ft 8 1/2 in)
- Position: Forward

Youth career
- 1992–1994: Mito Junior College High School
- 1995–1998: Kokushikan University

Senior career*
Years	Team	Apps	(Gls)
1999–2001	FC Tokyo	46	(4)
2002	Albirex Niigata	5	(0)
2004–2005	Matsumoto Yamaga FC	11	(7)
Total		62	(11)
- * Club domestic league appearances and goals

Toru Kaburagi (鏑木 享, Kaburagi Toru; born April 18, 1976) is a former Japanese football player.

== Playing career ==
Kaburagi was born in Omitama on April 18, 1976. After graduating from Kokushikan University, he joined the newly promoted J2 League club FC Tokyo in 1999. He played many matches as forward and left side midfielder during the first season. The club won second place and was promoted to the J1 League in 2000. However, his playing time decreased. In 2002, he moved to the J2 club Albirex Niigata, but he did not play often and left the club end in 2002. After a year and nine months, he joined the Regional Leagues club Matsumoto Yamaga FC in October 2004 and played until the end of the season. In May 2005, he joined Matsumoto Yamaga FC again and played until the end of that season.

== Career statistics ==
Appearances and goals by club, season and competition
Club	Season	League			Emperor's Cup		J.League Cup		Total	
Club	Season	Division	Apps	Goals	Apps	Goals	Apps	Goals	Apps	Goals
Kokushikan University	1998	Football League	20	8			—		20	8
FC Tokyo	1999	J2 League	30	3	3	0	6	3	39	6
FC Tokyo	2000	J1 League	7	0	1	0	0	0	8	0
FC Tokyo	2001	J1 League	9	1	0	0	1	0	10	1
Albirex Niigata	2002	J2 League	5	0	0	0	—		5	0
Matsumoto Yamaga FC	2004	Regional Leagues	2	1			—		2	1
Matsumoto Yamaga FC	2005	Regional Leagues	9	6			—		9	6
Career total			82	19	4	0	7	3	93	22
