= Jun Wada =

Japanese footballer

Jun Wada 和田 潤
Personal information
- Full name: Jun Wada
- Date of birth: November 28, 1973 (age 52)
- Place of birth: Chiba, Japan
- Height: 1.76 m (5 ft 9 1/2 in)
- Position: Forward

Youth career
- 1989–1991: Funabashi High School
- 1992–1995: Senshu University

Senior career*
Years	Team	Apps	(Gls)
1996–1999	FC Tokyo	74	(18)
Total		74	(18)
- * Club domestic league appearances and goals

Jun Wada (和田 潤, Wada Jun; born November 28, 1973) is a former Japanese football player.

== Playing career ==
Wada was born in Chiba Prefecture on November 28, 1973. After graduating from Senshu University, he joined Japan Football League club Tokyo Gas (later FC Tokyo) in 1996. He played many matches as forward from first season. However he could hardly play in the match for injury in 1998. Although the club was promoted to new league J2 League from 1999, he could not play many matches and retired end of 1999 season.

== Club statistics ==
Club performance			League		Cup		League Cup		Total	
Season	Club	League	Apps	Goals	Apps	Goals	Apps	Goals	Apps	Goals
Japan			League		Emperor's Cup		J.League Cup		Total	
1996	Tokyo Gas	Football League	27	11	3	5	-		30	16
1997	Tokyo Gas	Football League	24	6	0	0	-		24	6
1998	Tokyo Gas	Football League	5	1	0	0	-		5	1
1999	FC Tokyo	J2 League	18	0	0	0	4	0	22	0
Total			74	18	3	5	4	0	81	23
