= Takashi Okuhara =

Japanese footballer

Takashi Okuhara 奥原 崇
Personal information
- Full name: Takashi Okuhara
- Date of birth: July 31, 1972 (age 54)
- Place of birth: Inagi, Tokyo, Japan
- Height: 1.73 m (5 ft 8 in)
- Position: Midfielder

Youth career
- 1988–1990: Horikoshi High School
- 1991–1994: Chuo University

Senior career*
| Years | Team | Apps | (Gls) |
| 1995–1999 | FC Tokyo | 55 | (9) |
| Total | | 55 | (9) |
- * Club domestic league appearances and goals

Takashi Okuhara (奥原 崇, Okuhara Takashi; born July 31, 1972) is a former Japanese football player.

== Playing career ==
Okuhara was born in Inagi on July 31, 1972. After graduating from Chuo University, he joined Japan Football League club Tokyo Gas (later FC Tokyo) in 1995. He played many matches as offensive midfielder from 1996. The club results rose year by year and won the champions in 1998. The club was promoted to new league J2 League from 1999. However he could not play many matches for injury and left the club end of 1999 season.

== Career statistics ==
Appearances and goals by club, season and competition
| Club | Season | League | | | Emperor's Cup | | J.League Cup | | Total | |
| Club | Season | Division | Apps | Goals | Apps | Goals | Apps | Goals | Apps | Goals |
|---|---|---|---|---|---|---|---|---|---|---|
| Tokyo Gas | 1995 | Football League | 0 | 0 | 1 | 0 | — | | 1 | 0 |
| Tokyo Gas | 1996 | Football League | 18 | 2 | 0 | 0 | — | | 18 | 2 |
| Tokyo Gas | 1997 | Football League | 18 | 1 | 6 | 6 | — | | 24 | 7 |
| Tokyo Gas | 1998 | Football League | 12 | 5 | 3 | 0 | — | | 15 | 5 |
| FC Tokyo | 1999 | J2 League | 7 | 1 | 3 | 1 | 1 | 0 | 11 | 2 |
| Career total | | | 55 | 9 | 13 | 7 | 1 | 0 | 69 | 16 |
