= Mitsuhiro Toda =

Japanese footballer

Mitsuhiro Toda 戸田 光洋
Personal information
- Full name: Mitsuhiro Toda
- Date of birth: 10 September 1977 (age 49)
- Place of birth: Miyakonojo, Miyazaki, Japan
- Height: 1.80 m (5 ft 11 in)
- Position: Forward

Team information
- Current team: Kyoto Sanga (assistant)

Youth career
- 1993–1995: Miyakonojo Izumigaoka High School
- 1996–1999: University of Tsukuba

Senior career*
Years	Team	Apps	(Gls)
2000–2006	FC Tokyo	140	(20)
2007–2008	Shimizu S-Pulse	12	(1)
Total		152	(21)

Managerial career
- 2026: RB Omiya Ardija (caretaker)
- * Club domestic league appearances and goals

Mitsuhiro Toda (戸田 光洋, Toda Mitsuhiro; born 10 September 1977) is a Japanese former professional footballer. He currently serves as the assistant manager of J1 League club Kyoto Sanga. His younger brother Takayoshi Toda is also a former footballer.

== Playing career ==
Toda was born in Miyakonojo on 10 September 1977. After graduating from University of Tsukuba, he joined the sport and was promoted to J1 League club, FC Tokyo in 2000. He played many matches as substitute forward from first season. From summer 2002, he became a regular as left midfielder. In 2003, he played in all 40 official matches and scored 11 goals. In 2004, the club won the J.League Cup, the first major title in the club's history. However, his opportunity to play decreased in 2006 after breaking his leg before the opening season. In 2007, he moved to Shimizu S-Pulse. Although he also played as right-back, he could not play many matches due to injury in two seasons, and retired at the end of 2008 season.

== Career statistics ==
Appearances and goals by club, season and competition
Club	Season	League			Emperor's Cup		J.League Cup		Total	
Club	Season	Division	Apps	Goals	Apps	Goals	Apps	Goals	Apps	Goals
FC Tokyo	2000	J1 League	14	0	1	0	0	0	15	0
FC Tokyo	2001	J1 League	12	2	1	0	3	0	16	2
FC Tokyo	2002	J1 League	23	4	0	0	7	1	30	5
FC Tokyo	2003	J1 League	30	8	2	0	8	3	40	11
FC Tokyo	2004	J1 League	22	2	1	0	6	1	29	3
FC Tokyo	2005	J1 League	26	3	0	0	6	1	32	4
FC Tokyo	2006	J1 League	13	1	1	0	3	0	17	1
FC Tokyo	Total		140	20	6	0	33	6	179	26
Shimizu S-Pulse	2007	J1 League	4	0	0	0	0	0	4	0
Shimizu S-Pulse	2008	J1 League	8	1	0	0	2	0	10	1
Shimizu S-Pulse	Total		12	1	0	0	2	0	14	1
Total			152	21	6	0	35	6	193	27
