= Jo Kanazawa =

Japanese footballer

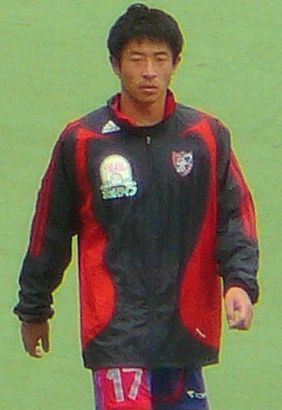

Personal information
- Full name: Jo Kanazawa
- Date of birth: July 9, 1976 (age 50)
- Place of birth: Iruma, Saitama, Japan
- Height: 1.73 m (5 ft 8 in)
- Position: Defender

Youth career
- 1992–1994: Bunan High School
- 1995–1998: Kokushikan University

Senior career*
Years	Team	Apps	(Gls)
1999–2002	Júbilo Iwata	63	(3)
2003–2009	FC Tokyo	123	(3)
2009–2013	Júbilo Iwata	36	(0)
2014	Thespakusatsu Gunma	10	(1)
Total		232	(7)
Medal record
Júbilo Iwata
Winner	J1 League	1999
Winner	J1 League	2002
Runner-up	J1 League	2001
Winner	J.League Cup	2010
Runner-up	J.League Cup	2001
FC Tokyo
Winner	J.League Cup	2004
Winner	J.League Cup	2009
- * Club domestic league appearances and goals

Jo Kanazawa (金沢 浄, Kanazawa Jo; born July 9, 1976) is a former Japanese football player.

== Playing career ==
Kanazawa was born in Iruma on July 9, 1976. After graduating from Kokushikan University, he joined J1 League club Júbilo Iwata in 1999. Although he could not become a regular player, he played many matches as left side midfielder from first season. The club won the champions 1999 and 2002 J1 League. In Asia, the club won the champions 1998–99 Asian Club Championship and the 2nd place 1999–00 and 2000–01 Asian Club Championship. In 2003, he moved to FC Tokyo. He became a regular player as left side back from first season. The club won the champions 2004 J.League Cup. Although he could hardly play in the match for injury in 2006, he came back and became a regular player again in 2007. From 2008, he lost regular position behind newcomer Yuto Nagatomo and he also played as defensive midfielder not only left side back. In August 2009, he moved to Júbilo Iwata for the first time in 7 years. He played as regular left side back in 2009 season. Although he could not play many matches from 2010, the club won the champions 2010 J.League Cup. His opportunity to play decreased from 2011 and he moved to J2 League club Thespakusatsu Gunma in 2014. He retired at the end of the 2014 season at the age of 38.

== Career statistics ==
Appearances and goals by club, season and competition
Club	Season	League			Emperor's Cup		J.League Cup		Total	
Club	Season	Division	Apps	Goals	Apps	Goals	Apps	Goals	Apps	Goals
Júbilo Iwata	1999	J1 League	12	0	0	0	2	0	14	0
Júbilo Iwata	2000	J1 League	10	0	0	0	3	0	13	0
Júbilo Iwata	2001	J1 League	19	2	2	0	7	0	28	2
Júbilo Iwata	2002	J1 League	22	1	0	0	6	1	28	2
FC Tokyo	2003	J1 League	30	3	2	0	7	0	39	3
FC Tokyo	2004	J1 League	24	0	2	0	9	0	35	0
FC Tokyo	2005	J1 League	22	0	2	0	6	0	30	0
FC Tokyo	2006	J1 League	0	0	0	0	2	0	2	0
FC Tokyo	2007	J1 League	29	0	2	0	6	1	37	1
FC Tokyo	2008	J1 League	14	0	1	0	5	0	20	0
FC Tokyo	2009	J1 League	4	0	0	0	2	0	6	0
Júbilo Iwata	2009	J1 League	8	0	3	0	0	0	11	0
Júbilo Iwata	2010	J1 League	14	0	3	0	5	1	22	1
Júbilo Iwata	2011	J1 League	8	0	1	0	1	0	10	0
Júbilo Iwata	2012	J1 League	5	0	2	0	3	0	10	0
Júbilo Iwata	2013	J1 League	1	0	4	0	1	0	6	0
Thespakusatsu Gunma	2014	J2 League	10	1	3	0	—		13	1
Career total			232	7	24	0	68	3	324	10
