= Ryuji Fujiyama =

Japanese footballer (born 1973)

Ryuji Fujiyama 藤山 竜仁
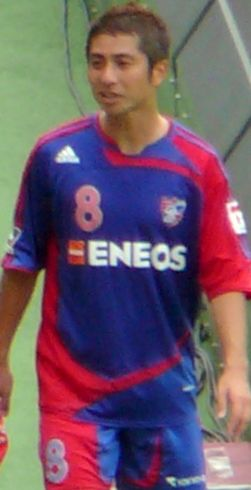

Personal information
- Full name: Ryuji Fujiyama
- Date of birth: June 9, 1973 (age 53)
- Place of birth: Kagoshima, Kagoshima, Japan
- Height: 1.70 m (5 ft 7 in)
- Position: Defender

Youth career
- 1989–1991: Kagoshima Jitsugyo High School

Senior career*
Years	Team	Apps	(Gls)
1992–2009	FC Tokyo	409	(13)
2010	Consadole Sapporo	31	(0)
Total		440	(13)
Medal record
FC Tokyo
Winner	J.League Cup	2004
Winner	J.League Cup	2009
- * Club domestic league appearances and goals

Ryuji Fujiyama (藤山 竜仁, Fujiyama Ryūji; born June 9, 1973) is a Japanese former football player.

== Playing career ==
Fujiyama was born in Kagoshima on June 9, 1973. After graduating from high school, he joined Japan Football League club Tokyo Gas (later FC Tokyo) in 1992. He became a regular player as side midfielder and defensive midfielder from first season. In the middle of 1995, he was converted to left side back by manager Kiyoshi Okuma and played many matches as left side back for a long time. The club results also rose year by year and won the champions in 1998 and was promoted to new league J2 League from 1999. In 1999, the club won the 2nd place and was promoted to J1 League from 2000. Although he operated on his right ankle end of 2001 season and his opportunity to play decreased from 2002, he also played many matches as center back not only side back. In 2004, the club won the champions J.League Cup first major title in the club history. At the Final against Urawa Reds, he played as center back from the 33rd minute, because Jean received a red card and he sealed off Urawa's attack. Although he became a regular player as center back again, his opportunity to play decreased from 2008. In 2010, he moved to J2 club Consadole Sapporo. He played as regular player as center back and right side back and retired at the end of the 2010 season.

== Career statistics ==
Appearances and goals by club, season and competition
Club	Season	League			Emperor's Cup		J.League Cup		Total	
Club	Season	Division	Apps	Goals	Apps	Goals	Apps	Goals	Apps	Goals
Tokyo Gas	1992	Football League	18	1	0	0	—		18	1
Tokyo Gas	1993	Football League	17	3	—		—		17	3
Tokyo Gas	1994	Football League	30	0	3	0	—		33	0
Tokyo Gas	1995	Football League	29	3	1	0	—		30	3
Tokyo Gas	1996	Football League	30	1	3	0	—		33	1
Tokyo Gas	1997	Football League	29	1	6	0	—		35	1
Tokyo Gas	1998	Football League	28	2	3	0	—		31	2
FC Tokyo	1999	J2 League	35	1	4	0	8	0	47	1
FC Tokyo	2000	J1 League	30	0	1	0	2	0	33	0
FC Tokyo	2001	J1 League	30	0	0	0	4	0	34	0
FC Tokyo	2002	J1 League	20	0	1	0	5	0	26	0
FC Tokyo	2003	J1 League	12	0	2	0	4	0	18	0
FC Tokyo	2004	J1 League	18	0	3	0	7	0	28	0
FC Tokyo	2005	J1 League	15	0	2	0	1	0	18	0
FC Tokyo	2006	J1 League	17	1	2	0	1	0	20	1
FC Tokyo	2007	J1 League	32	0	3	0	7	0	42	0
FC Tokyo	2008	J1 League	15	0	4	0	6	0	25	0
FC Tokyo	2009	J1 League	4	0	1	0	1	0	6	0
Consadole Sapporo	2010	J2 League	31	0	1	0	—		32	0
Career total			440	13	40	0	46	0	526	13
