= Reiichi Ikegami =

Japanese footballer

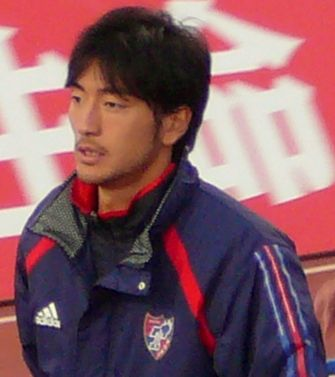

Personal information
- Date of birth: 12 July 1983 (age 43)
- Place of birth: Chiba, Chiba, Japan
- Height: 1.77 m (5 ft 9 1/2 in)
- Position: Midfielder

Youth career
- 2002–2005: Sendai University

Senior career*
Years	Team	Apps	(Gls)
2006–2008	FC Tokyo	2	(0)
2008	Thespa Kusatsu	0	(0)
2009	FC Kariya	11	(3)
2010–2011	FC Gifu	16	(0)
Total		29	(3)
- * Club domestic league appearances and goals

Reiichi Ikegami (池上 礼一, Ikegami Reiichi; born 12 July 1983) is a former Japanese football player.

Ikegami previously played for FC Tokyo in the J1 League.

== Club statistics ==
Club performance			League		Cup		League Cup		Total	
Season	Club	League	Apps	Goals	Apps	Goals	Apps	Goals	Apps	Goals
Japan			League		Emperor's Cup		J.League Cup		Total	
2006	FC Tokyo	J1 League	0	0	1	0	0	0	1	0
2007	FC Tokyo	J1 League	2	0	1	0	1	0	4	0
2008	FC Tokyo	J1 League	0	0	0	0	1	0	1	0
2008	Thespa Kusatsu	J2 League	0	0	0	0	-		0	0
2009	FC Kariya	Football League	11	3	0	0	-		11	3
2010	FC Gifu	J2 League	16	0	1	0	-		17	0
2011	FC Gifu	J2 League	0	0	0	0	0	0	0	0
Country	Japan		29	3	3	0	2	0	34	3
Total			29	3	3	0	2	0	34	3
