= Kenji Suzuki (footballer) =

Japanese footballer

Personal information
- Full name: Kenji Suzuki
- Date of birth: September 3, 1986 (age 40)
- Place of birth: Akita, Akita, Japan
- Height: 1.78 m (5 ft 10 in)
- Position: Midfielder

Team information
- Current team: Tochigi Uva FC
- Number: 26

Senior career*
Years	Team	Apps	(Gls)
2005–2008	FC Tokyo	0	(0)
2006	→Albirex Niigata Singapore (loan)	28	(0)
2008–2010	Gainare Tottori	31	(4)
2011–2015	Blaublitz Akita	61	(0)
2016	Tochigi Uva	17	(0)
2018	Akita FC Cambiare		
Total		137	(4)
- * Club domestic league appearances and goals as of July 16, 2020

Kenji Suzuki (鈴木 健児, Suzuki Kenji; born September 3, 1986) is a retired Japanese football player. The last team that he played for was Akita FC Cambiare.
