= Nobuyuki Abe (footballer) =

Japanese footballer (born 1984)

Personal information
- Date of birth: 27 April 1984 (age 42)
- Place of birth: Higashiyamato, Tokyo, Japan
- Height: 1.86 m (6 ft 1 in)
- Position: Goalkeeper

Youth career
- 2000–2002: FC Tokyo U18
- 2005–2006: Ryutsu Keizai University

Senior career*
Years	Team	Apps	(Gls)
2007–2010	FC Tokyo	0	(0)
2011–2014	Shonan Bellmare	50	(0)
2015–2016	Giravanz Kitakyushu	48	(0)
2017–2020	Nagano Parceiro	58	(0)
2021	FC Tokyo	0	(0)
2022	Iwate Grulla Morioka	1	(0)
Total		157	(0)
Medal record
FC Tokyo
Winner	J.League Cup	2009
- * Club domestic league appearances and goals

Nobuyuki Abe (阿部 伸行, Abe Nobuyuki; born 27 April 1984) is a Japanese former professional footballer who played as a goalkeeper.

== Career statistics ==
Updated to 23 February 2020.

Appearances and goals by club, season and competition
Club	Season	League			Emperor's Cup		J.League Cup		Total	
Club	Season	Division	Apps	Goals	Apps	Goals	Apps	Goals	Apps	Goals
Ryutsu Keizai; University	2005	JFL	11	0	—		—		11	0
Ryutsu Keizai; University	2006	JFL	6	0	0	0	—		6	0
FC Tokyo	2007	J1 League	0	0	0	0	0	0	0	0
FC Tokyo	2008	J1 League	0	0	0	0	0	0	0	0
FC Tokyo	2009	J1 League	0	0	0	0	0	0	0	0
FC Tokyo	2010	J1 League	0	0	0	0	0	0	0	0
Shonan Bellmare	2011	J2 League	0	0	2	0	—		2	0
Shonan Bellmare	2012	J2 League	37	0	1	0	—		38	0
Shonan Bellmare	2013	J1 League	13	0	0	0	2	0	15	0
Shonan Bellmare	2014	J2 League	0	0	0	0	—		0	0
Giravanz Kitakyushu	2015	J2 League	24	0	1	0	—		25	0
Giravanz Kitakyushu	2016	J2 League	24	0	2	0	—		26	0
Nagano Parceiro	2017	J3 League	30	0	0	0	—		30	0
Nagano Parceiro	2018	J3 League	13	0	0	0	—		13	0
Nagano Parceiro	2019	J3 League	10	0	1	0	—		11	0
Career total			151	0	7	0	2	0	160	0
