= Edogawa Stadium =

Stadium in Seishincho, Tokyo, Japan

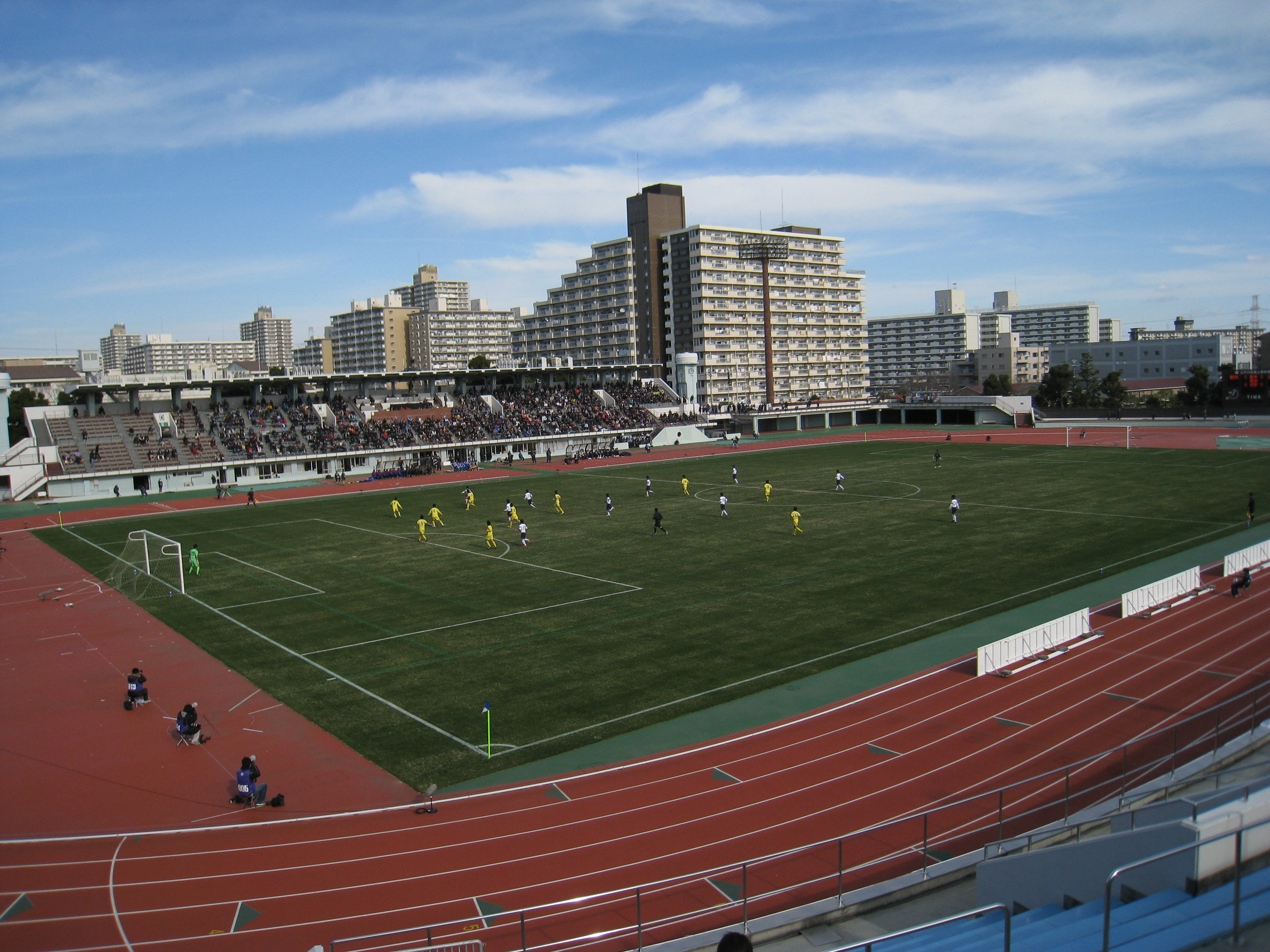
- Interactive map of Edogawa Stadium
- Full name: Edogawa Stadium
- Coordinates: 35°39′19″N 139°51′9″E
- Owner: Edogawa Ward
- Capacity: 6,950
- Surface: Grass
- Field size: 105×70m

Construction
- Opened: 1984

Tenant
- Kubota Spears Funabashi Tokyo Bay

Edogawa City Track & Field Stadium (江戸川区陸上競技場, Edogawa-ku rikujō kyōgi-jō) is a multi-purpose stadium in the Edogawa area of Tokyo, Japan. As the home of the Kubota Spears Funabashi Tokyo Bay of the Japan Rugby League One, the stadium is often referred to as the Spears EDORIKU Field (スピアーズえどりくフィールド).

The stadium looks the same as many multi-purpose stadiums of its era in Japan. The stadium seats 6,950 and is mainly used for football and rugby union but features a broad running track for track and field events.

It served as home to Sagawa Express Tokyo until 2006. In addition to other sports, the stadium hosted the Women's Lacrosse World Cup in 1997.

== Facilities ==
- Four floodlights
- All-weather track of 400 m x 8 lanes, 3,000 m obstacle course etc.
- Natural turf field (105 x 70 m for soccer, lacrosse and rugby)
- Scoreboard (electric)

== Access ==
- 15 minutes' walk from Nishi-Kasai Station on the Tokyo Metro Tōzai Line.
- 25 minutes' walk from Kasai-Rinkai Park Station on the Keiyō Line.
- Toei Buses also go to the stadium.
