= Hiroshi Jofuku =

Japanese footballer and manager

Hiroshi Jofuku 城福 浩
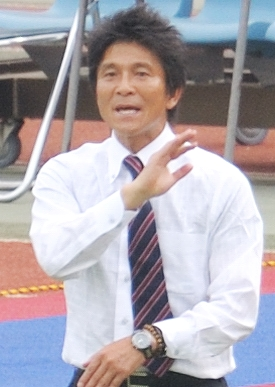

Personal information
- Full name: Jofuku Hiroshi
- Date of birth: March 21, 1961 (age 65)
- Place of birth: Tokushima, Tokushima, Japan
- Height: 1.67 m (5 ft 5 1/2 in)
- Position: Midfielder

Team information
- Current team: Avispa Fukuoka (manager)

Youth career
- 1976–1978: Johoku High School

College career
Years	Team	Apps	(Gls)
1979–1982	Waseda University		

Senior career*
Years	Team	Apps	(Gls)
1983–1989	Fujitsu		

Managerial career
- 1996: Fujitsu
- 2005–2007: Japan U-17
- 2008–2010: FC Tokyo
- 2012–2014: Ventforet Kofu
- 2016: FC Tokyo
- 2018–2021: Sanfrecce Hiroshima
- 2022–2026: Tokyo Verdy
- 2026–: Avispa Fukuoka
- * Club domestic league appearances and goals

Hiroshi Jofuku (城福 浩, Jofuku Hiroshi; born March 21, 1961) is a Japanese professional football manager and former footballer who is manager of J1 League club Avispa Fukuoka.

== Playing career ==
Jofuku was born in Tokushima on March 21, 1961. After graduating from Waseda University, he played for Fujitsu from 1983 to 1989.

== Coaching career ==
After retirement, Jofuku became a coach at Fujitsu in 1993. In 1996, he was promoted to a manager. In 1999, he moved to FC Tokyo.

Jofuku also became a manager for Japan U-17 national team from 2005. U-17 Japan won 2006 AFC U-17 Championship and participated in 2007 U-17 World Cup. In 2008, he became a manager for FC Tokyo. The club won the champions in 2009 J.League Cup. However, the club results were bad in the 2010 season and he was sacked in September when the club was at the 16th place of 18 clubs.

In 2012, Jofuku signed with J2 League club Ventforet Kofu and led the club to win the J.League Division 2 that season. In 2014, the club finished at the 13th place in the 2014 J.League Division 1, which is their best position in the club history. However, he left the club at the end of season.

In 2016, he returned to FC Tokyo and managed the club. However, he was sacked for poor performance in July. In 2018, he signed with Sanfrecce Hiroshima. The club won the 2nd place in the 2018 season.

Jofuku was named manager of Tokyo Verdy on June 15, 2022. Jofuku lead the team a promotion to the J1 League at the end of 2023 J2 League season through play-off. After a poor start to the 2026–27 season and Verdy in 19th place, in October 2026 Jofuku was sacked after winning none of their first eight games.

In November 2026, Jofuku was appointed as J1 League club Avispa Fukuoka manager, with the club bottom of the league.

== Managerial statistics ==
As of 5 October 2026

Managerial record by team and tenure
Team	From	To	Record					Ref.
Team	From	To	G	W	D	L	Win %	Ref.
Japan U17	1 February 2007	31 January 2008	3	1	0	2	33.33	
FC Tokyo	1 February 2008	19 September 2010	127	57	29	41	44.88	
Ventforet Kofu	1 February 2012	31 January 2015	130	50	44	36	38.46	
FC Tokyo	1 February 2016	24 July 2016	31	12	6	13	38.71	
Sanfrecce Hiroshima	1 February 2018	25 October 2021	165	70	41	54	42.42	
Tokyo Verdy	13 June 2022	5 October 2026	176	71	46	59	40.34	
Career Total			576	246	153	177	42.71	
