= FC Tokyo =

Japanese professional football club

FC Tokyo 東京
- Full name: Football Club Tokyo
- Nicknames: Aoaka (青赤) Blue and Reds; Gasmen
- Founded: 1935; 91 years ago as Tokyo Gas FC; 1999; 27 years ago as FC Tokyo
- Stadium: Ajinomoto Stadium; Chōfu, Tokyo
- Capacity: 49,970
- Chairman: Naoki Ogane
- Head coach: Rikizo Matsuhashi
- League: J1 League
- 2026: J1 League, 4th of 20
- Website: www.fctokyo.co.jp
Home colours	Away colours

Football Club Tokyo (フットボールクラブ東京, Futtobōru Kurabu Tōkyō), commonly known as FC Tokyo (FC東京, Efushī Tōkyō), is a Japanese professional football club based in Tokyo. The club plays in the J1 League, the top tier of football in the country.

FC Tokyo is one of the few J.League clubs to be simply called Football Club without an extended name or moniker, the others being Yokohama FC, Ehime FC, Iwaki FC, FC Imabari, FC Gifu, FC Ryukyu and FC Osaka which is currently playing their trades in the J.League.

The club have won 1 J2 League titles, 1 Emperor's Cup and 3 J.League Cup. The club also won the 2010 J.League Cup / Copa Sudamericana Championship.

== History ==
=== Formation and early years (1935–1997) ===
The team started as a company team, Tokyo Gas Football Club (東京ガスサッカー部) in 1935. The club played in the Tokyo League, got promoted to the Kanto League in 1986 and suddenly achieved a good 4th-place finish. Their first appearance in the national leagues was in 1991, the last season of the old Japan Soccer League.

Following the professionalisation of Japanese football with the creation of the J.League in 1993, Tokyo Gas began preparing for entry into the professional pyramid. The team competed in the former Japan Football League during the 1990s and gradually developed a stronger organisational structure and supporter base in Tokyo.

With addition of the Brazilian player Amaral and manager Kiyoshi Okuma at the helms, the team gradually became competitive and in 1997, the team finished second, winning the JFL championship the next year. However, at the time the team lacked the necessary qualifications for a promotion to the J1 league and so stayed in the J2 League.

=== Establishment of a new identity (1998–2009) ===
Following this, on 1 October 1998, companies like Tokyo Gas, TEPCO, ampm, TV Tokyo, and Culture Convenience Club, set up a joint company Tokyo Football Club Company with the aim of making the team eligible for joining the J.League. In 1999, the team changed its name to ''FC Tokyo'' and entered the second division of the J2 League, defeating three J1 League teams in a row in the J.League Cup, which they first participated in, and advancing to the top four. In the same year, FC Tokyo became eligible, they finished second in the J2 league and were automatically promoted to J1 beginning in the 2000 season. Despite a widespread belief that the team would barely win enough to stay in the J1, the team won four games in a row since its opening game and managed to finish at the 7th spot.

Helped by its winning record, the attendance shot up and it is still above that of well-known Tokyo Verdy 1969 that moved its home town from Kawasaki, Kanagawa in 2001. Since 2002, the team welcomed Hiromi Hara as its manager and aimed for a championship with a strong offense. The 2003 season had the team finish in 4th, its highest ever. In August of the same year, FC Tokyo played a friendly match against Real Madrid at the Japan National Stadium in Tokyo, where FC Tokyo lost 3-0.

Long-time leader Amaral, nicknamed The King of Tokyo by his fans, departed the team to join Shonan Bellmare in 2004. He was replaced by Athens Olympics national football team player Yasuyuki Konno from Consadole Sapporo. In November of the same year, it won the J.League Cup for its first major title since joining the J.League.

After 10 years of participation in the J.League without a mascot character, the team adopted Tokyo Dorompa, a tanuki-like figure, as its mascot in January 2009.

=== Relegation and immediate return (2010–2012) ===
On 4 December 2010, FC Tokyo had to win their final game of the season away to already relegated Kyoto Sanga. FC Tokyo lost 2–0 and went back down to the second tier for the first time in 11 years. Nevertheless, they bounced back at the first attempt, winning the J2 League title in November 2011.

Before their 2011 Emperor's Cup win, FC Tokyo reached the semifinals of the competition three times: in 1997 (as Tokyo Gas), 2008, and on 2010. Their 2011 win was remarkably special, as the club won the competition whilst being a J2 team. They became the first J2 team, and third among the second-tier champions overall (after NKK SC in 1981 and Júbilo Iwata in 1982), to accomplish the feat of winning the competition.

=== Stability and cup success (2013–present) ===
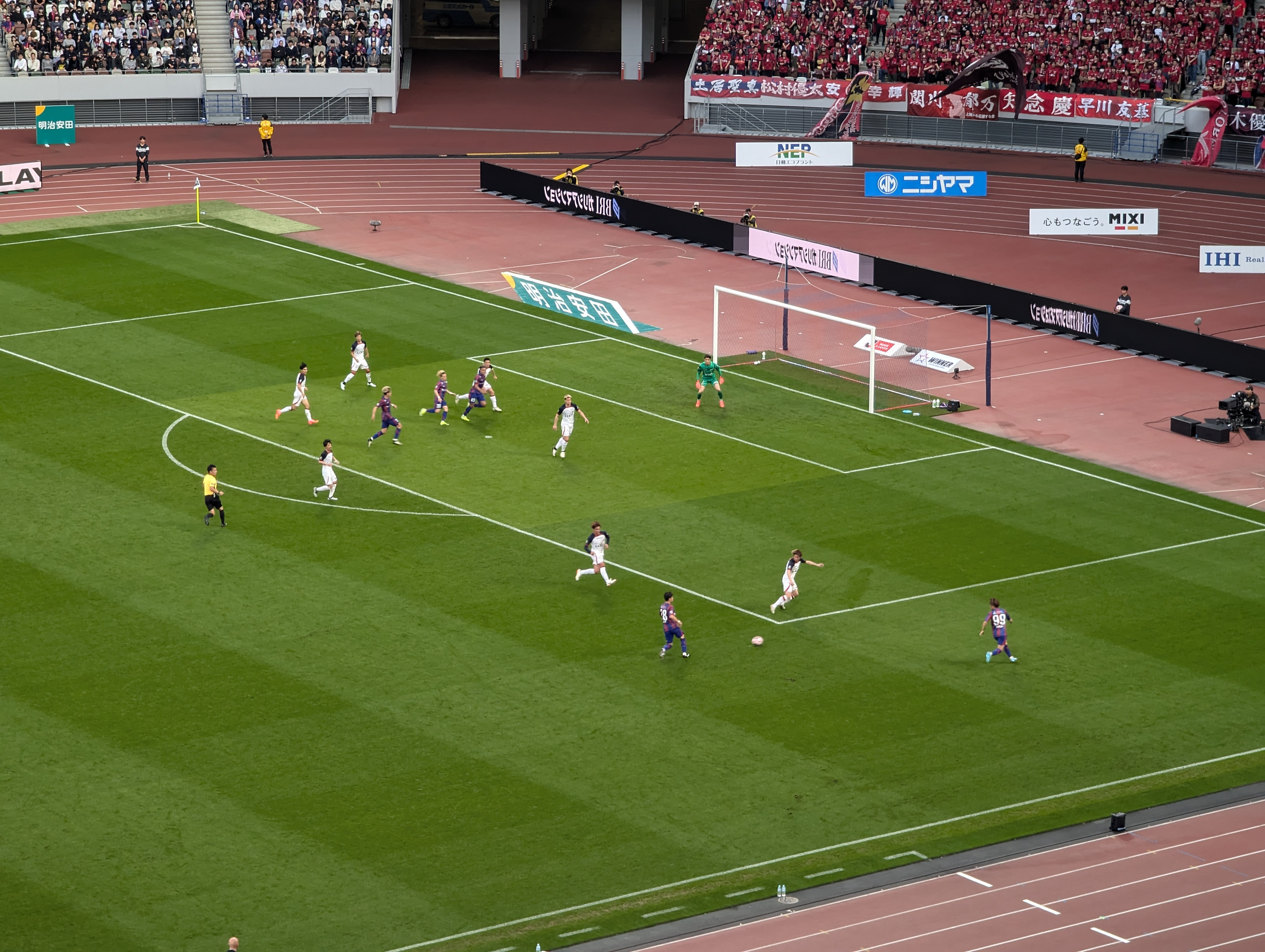
FC Tokyo in action against Kashima Antlers in 2024

FC Tokyo remained a stable presence in the J1 League. The club regularly finished in the upper half of the table and qualified for continental competitions making their debut in the 2012 AFC Champions League being drawn in Group F alongside Korean club Ulsan Hyundai, Australian club Brisbane Roar and Chinese club Beijing Guoan. FC Tokyo went on to finished with 11 points as group runners-up subsequently only losing to Ulsan Hyundai 1–0 on the final group stage fixture on 16 May 2012. FC Tokyo then advanced to the round of 16 facing another Chinese club Guangzhou Evergrande but lost 1–0 to the opposition thus knocking out from the competition.

The 2019 season marked one of the club’s strongest league campaigns, as FC Tokyo challenged for the title before eventually finishing as runners-up behind Yokohama F. Marinos.

In 2020, FC Tokyo secured their third J.League Cup title after defeating Kashiwa Reysol 2–1 in the final, further strengthening their reputation as a competitive side in domestic tournaments.

== Team image ==
=== Crest and logo change ===
In 2021, FC Tokyo introduced a redesigned club crest as part of a broader rebranding initiative. The updated logo retained the club’s traditional blue and red colours but featured a simplified and modernised design.

The new crest emphasized the initials “FC TOKYO” in a cleaner and more contemporary style while maintaining elements of the club’s identity, including the shield shape and vertical colour division. The redesign was intended to modernise the club’s visual identity while preserving its historical connection to supporters and the city of Tokyo. The updated emblem began appearing on club kits and official materials from the 2021 season onward.

=== Rivalries ===
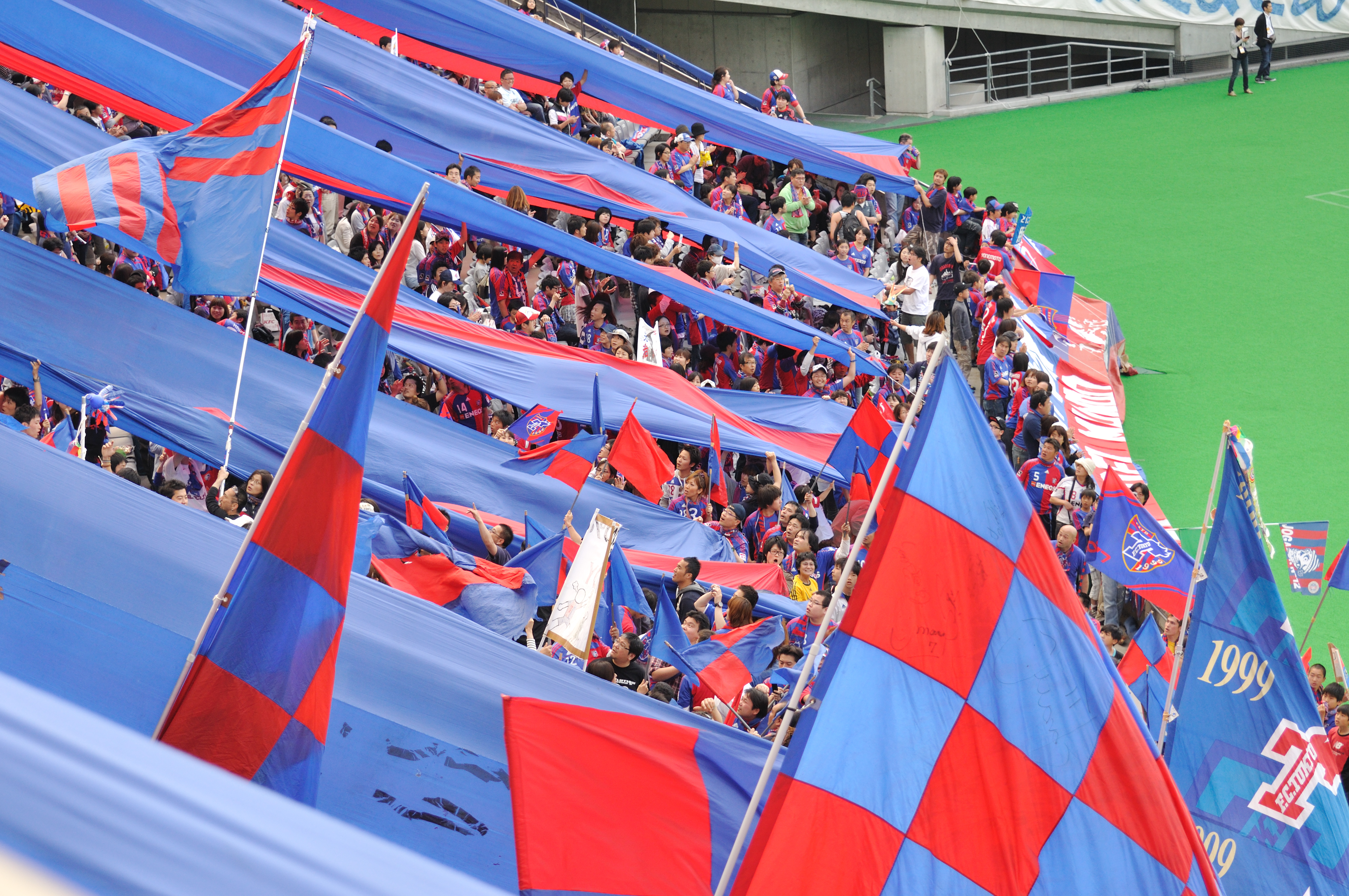
FC Tokyo fans during the Tokyo derby against Tokyo Verdy

==== Tokyo Derby ====
The Tokyo Derby refers to matches between FC Tokyo and Tokyo Verdy, two clubs representing the Tokyo metropolitan area in the J.League. The rivalry is considered one of the traditional derbies in Japanese football, reflecting the competition for prominence within Tokyo.

The rivalry originated from the late 1990s when FC Tokyo entered the professional league system, while Tokyo Verdy had already been established as one of the most successful clubs during the early years of the J.League. Matches between the two teams quickly gained attention due to their shared representation of Tokyo and the contrasting histories of the clubs.

Tokyo Verdy, was one of the dominant clubs in Japanese football during the 1990s, winning multiple league titles in the early J.League era. In contrast, FC Tokyo developed later but gradually established itself as a competitive club in the top division. The rivalry therefore represents both geographic and generational differences within Tokyo football. The derby continues to symbolize the rivalry for football prominence in Tokyo and remains a significant fixture for supporters of both clubs.

==== Tamagawa Classico ====
The most notable rivalry involving FC Tokyo is with nearby club Kawasaki Frontale. Matches between the two teams are known as the 'Tamagawa Classico', named after the Tama River that geographically separates Tokyo and Kawasaki.

The rivalry developed after both clubs established themselves in the J1 League during the 2000s. Due to the close proximity of the two cities, fixtures between the clubs attract strong interest from supporters and are often among the most anticipated matches of the season.

Encounters in the Tamagawa Classico have frequently been high-scoring and competitive, with both teams known for attacking styles of play. The rivalry gained further prominence during the late 2010s when Kawasaki Frontale emerged as one of the dominant teams in Japanese football while FC Tokyo regularly competed near the top of the league table.

== Stadium ==
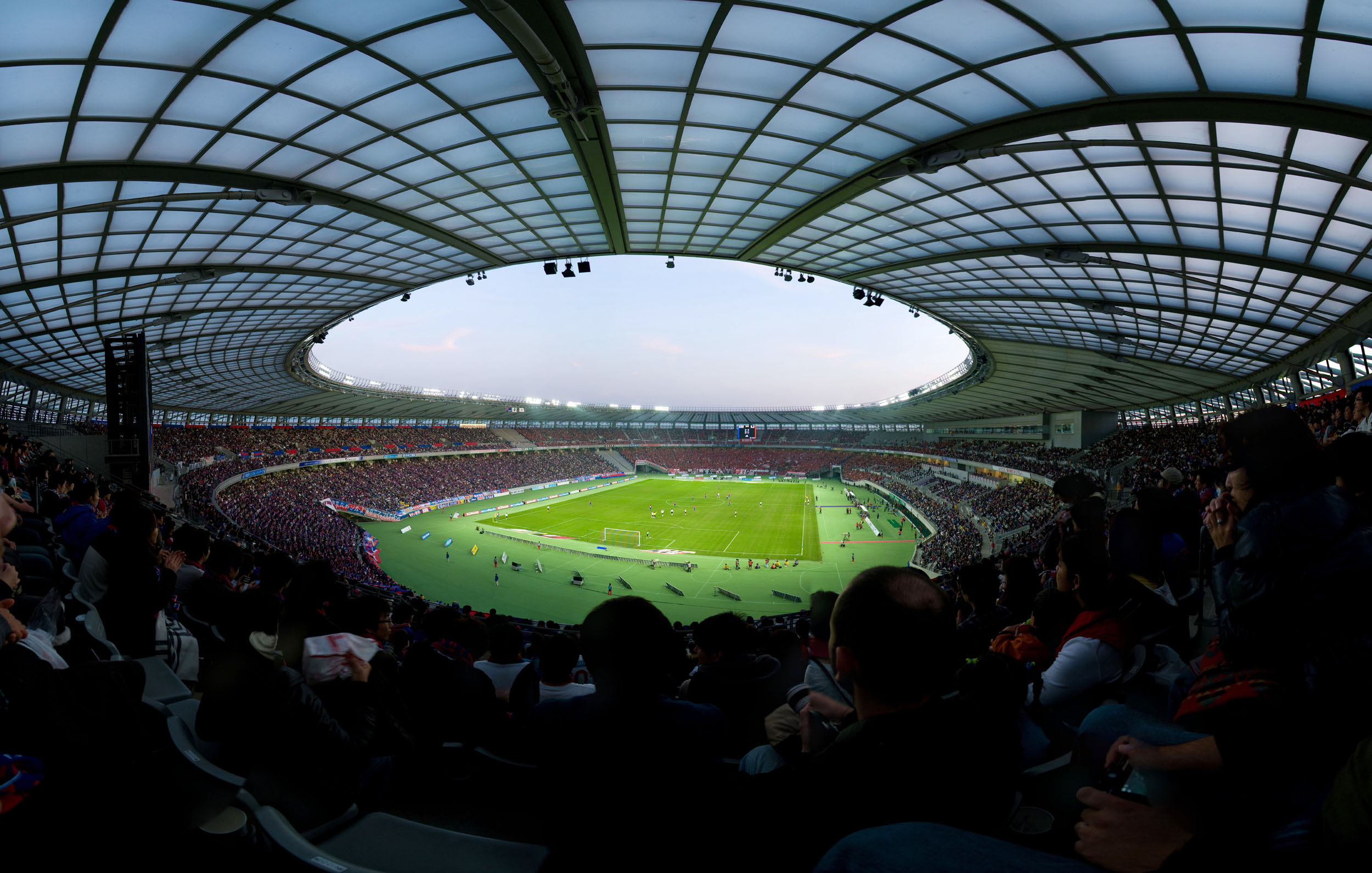
Ajinomoto Stadium

FC Tokyo uses Ajinomoto Stadium as its home ground (the official name of this stadium is Tokyo Stadium). It can hold up to 49,970 capacity of fans in the stadium. For a long time it did not have a home stadium of its own and played at various football fields such as the National Olympic Stadium, the National Nishigaoka Football Field, Edogawa Special Ward Stadium, and the Komazawa Olympic Park Stadium, but in 2001 it finally found a permanent home. The club's training grounds are Sarue Ground in Kōtō, Tokyo, and Kodaira Ground in Kodaira, Tokyo.

In order to comply with height limitation close to the airport, the pitch is sunk below the level of the land around the stadium

== Kit suppliers and shirt sponsors ==
=== Sponsors ===
Year	Kit manufacturer	Main sponsor
1993	(England) Admiral	(Japan) Tokyo Gas
1994–1998	(Germany) Adidas	(Japan) Tokyo Gas
1999–2001	(Germany) Adidas	(United States) ampm
2002–2013	(Germany) Adidas	(Japan) Eneos
2010–2014	(Germany) Adidas	(Japan) Lifeval
2015–2018	(England) Umbro	(Japan) Lifeval
2019–2020	(England) Umbro	(Japan) XFLAG
2021	(United States) New Balance	(Japan) XFLAG
2022–2023	(United States) New Balance	(Japan) Mixi
2024–present	(United States) New Balance	(Japan) Tokyo Gas

=== Kit evolution ===
Home Kit - 1st
1999 - 2000	2001 - 2002	2003 - 2004	2005 - 2006	2007
2008 - 2009	2010 - 2011	2012	2013 - 2014	2015
2016	2017	2018	2019	2020
2021	2022	2023	2024	2025
2026 -

Away Kit - 2nd
1999 - 2000	2001	2002 - 2003	2004 - 2005	2006 - 2007
2008 - 2009	2010 - 2011	2012	2013 - 2014	2015
2016	2017	2018	2019	2020
2021	2022	2023	2024	2025
2026 -

3rd kit - Other
1999 3rd	2004; Juan Acuña Cup	2012; ACL 1st	2012; ACL 2nd	2015; Frankfurt Finance Cup
2016; ACL 1st	2016; ACL 2nd	2017; Germany Expedition	2018; 20th anniversary	2020; ACL 1st
2020; ACL 2nd	2021 3rd	2022 3rd	2023; 25th Anniversary	2024 3rd
2025; Grey Days

== Players ==
=== Current squad ===
As of 18 September 2026.

Note: Flags indicate national team as defined under FIFA eligibility rules; some limited exceptions apply. Players may hold more than one non-FIFA nationality.

No.	Pos.	Nation	Player
1	GK	JPN	Hayate Tanaka
2	DF	JPN	Sei Muroya (captain)
3	DF	JPN	Masato Morishige
4	DF	JPN	Hayato Inamura
5	DF	JPN	Yūto Nagatomo
6	DF	JPN	Kashif Bangnagande
7	MF	JPN	Soma Anzai
8	MF	JPN	Takahiro Ko (vice-captain)
9	FW	BRA	Marcelo Ryan
10	FW	JPN	Kein Satō (vice-captain)
15	DF	JPN	Rio Omori
17	MF	DEN	Nicolai Vallys
18	MF	JPN	Kento Hashimoto
19	MF	JPN	Shion Homma
20	DF	JPN	Shuto Nagano
21	MF	JPN	Yuta Sugawara ^{Type 2}

No.	Pos.	Nation	Player
22	DF	JPN	Hirokazu Ishihara
24	DF	DEN	Alexander Scholz
25	FW	JPN	Tsuna Kominato ^{DSP}
26	FW	JPN	Motoki Nagakura
27	MF	JPN	Kyota Tokiwa
33	FW	JPN	Kōta Tawaratsumida
37	GK	JPN	Matthew Watanabe ^{Type 2}
38	MF	JPN	Kio Tanaka ^{Type 2}
39	FW	JPN	Teruhito Nakagawa
42	DF	JPN	Kento Hashimoto
44	MF	JPN	Kaede Suzuki ^{Type 2}
55	FW	JPN	Divine Chinedu Otani ^{Type 2}
58	GK	JPN	Wataru Goto
71	FW	JPN	Fūki Yamada
81	GK	KOR	Kim Seung-gyu
99	FW	ESP	Dani Gómez

=== Out on loan ===
Note: Flags indicate national team as defined under FIFA eligibility rules; some limited exceptions apply. Players may hold more than one non-FIFA nationality.

No.	Pos.	Nation	Player
—	DF	KOR	Baek In-hwan (at Azul Claro Numazu)
—	DF	JPN	Teppei Oka (at Avispa Fukuoka)
—	MF	BRA	Everton Galdino (at (Brazil) Vila Nova)
—	DF	JPN	Kanta Doi (at V-Varen Nagasaki)
—	FW	JPN	Leon Nozawa (at Júbilo Iwata)
—	MF	JPN	Maki Kitahara (at Fujieda MYFC)
—	GK	JPN	Keita Niibori (at Yokogawa Musashino FC)

No.	Pos.	Nation	Player
—	GK	JPN	Masataka Kobayashi (at Matsumoto Yamaga)
—	MF	JPN	Yuta Arai (at Renofa Yamaguchi)
—	FW	JPN	Taiyo Yamaguchi (at Tochigi SC)
—	DF	JPN	Renta Higashi (at Tochigi SC)
—	FW	JPN	Naoki Kumata (at Iwaki FC)
—	MF	JPN	Yuki Kajiura (at FC Imabari)
—	DF	JPN	Kojiro Yasuda (at Ventforet Kofu)

== Management and staff ==
Club officials for 2025 season.

Position	Name
Head coach	(Japan) Rikizo Matsuhashi
Assistant coach	(Japan) Takashi Okuhara (Japan) Minoru Kobayashi (Japan) Yu Tokisaki
Goalkeeping coach	(Japan) Hisanori Fujiwara
Assistant goalkeeping coach	(Japan) Shota Yamashita
Head of analysis	(Japan) Hiroaki Fujii
Coach and analyst	(Japan) Daisuke Kondo (Japan) Seiya Imazaki
Analyst	(Japan) Yuki Shirozu (Japan) Keito Asahara
Conditioning director	(Spain) Guillerme
Physical coach	(Japan) Naoki Hayakawa
Physiotherapist	(Japan) Yukihisa Miyama
Athletic trainer	(Japan) Masato Saegusa (Japan) Yusuke Ozawa (Japan) Yohei Kojo
Trainer	(Japan) Naofumi Aoki
Chief manager	(Japan) Kenta Hontani
Manager and interpreter	(Japan) Kazunori Iino
Interpreter and equipment manager	(Japan) Ricardo Oyafuso
Interpreter	(Japan) Hiroshi Endo
Kit manager	(Japan) Yukinori Yamakawa
Side manager and equipment	(Japan) Fumiya Soma
Team performance advisor	(Japan) Shinya Fukutomi

== Honours ==
As both Tokyo Gas SC (1935–1999) and FC Tokyo (1999–present)

Type	Honours	Titles	Season
League	J2 League	1	2011
League	Japan Football League	1	1998
League	Regional League Promotion Series	1	1990
Cup	Emperor's Cup	1	2011
Cup	J.League Cup	3	2004, 2009, 2020
Regional	J.League Cup / Copa Sudamericana Championship	1	2010

Bold is for those competition that are currently active.

== Records and statistics ==
As of 9 October 2026.

Top 10 all-time appearances
Rank	Player	Years	Club appearance
1	(Japan) Masato Morishige	2010–present	590
2	(Japan) Yūhei Tokunaga	2003–2004, 2006–2017	513
3	(Japan) Keigo Higashi	2013–2026	432
4	(Japan) Naohiro Ishikawa	2002–2017	391
5	(Japan) Yōhei Kajiyama	2003–2018	380
6	(Japan) Yasuyuki Konno	2004–2011	310
7	(Japan) Ryuji Fujiyama	1992–2009	293
8	(Japan) Takuji Yonemoto	2009–2018	284
10	(Japan) Yoichi Doi	2000–2007	263
10	(Brazil) Lucas Severino	2004–2007, 2011–2013	263

Top 10 all-time goals
Rank	Player	Club appearance	Total goals
1	(Brazil) Lucas Severino	263	95
2	(Brazil) Diego Oliveira	256	86
3	(Brazil) Amaral	154	70
3	(Japan) Naohiro Ishikawa	391	70
5	(Japan) Sōta Hirayama	232	56
6	(Japan) Masato Morishige	590	49
7	(Brazil) Adaílton	165	45
8	(Japan) Yasuyuki Konno	310	37
9	(Brazil) Kelly Guimarães	124	36
10	(Japan) Shingo Akamine	136	35

- Biggest wins:
  - 9–0 vs Kansai University (30 November 1997)
  - 9–0 vs (Thailand) Chonburi (9 February 2016)
- Heaviest defeats: 8–0 vs Yokohama F. Marinos (6 November 2021)
- Youngest ever debutant: Maki Kitahara ~ 15 years 7 months 22 days old (On 1 March 2025 vs Kashima Antlers)
- Oldest ever player: Yūto Nagatomo ~ 40 years 0 months 0 days old (On 12 September 2026 vs Gamba Osaka)
- Youngest goal scorers: Takefusa Kubo ~ 16 years 9 months 10 days old (On 14 March 2018 vs Albirex Niigata)
- Oldest goal scorers: Masato Morishige ~ 39 years 3 months 5 days old (On 28 August 2026 vs AC Nagano Parceiro)

== Award winners ==
As of the end of the 2025 season.

- J.League Best XI:
  - (Brazil) Tuto (2000)
  - (Japan) Yoichi Doi (2004)
  - (Japan) Naohiro Ishikawa (2009)
  - (Japan) Yūto Nagatomo (2009)
  - (Japan) Masato Morishige (2013, 2014, 2015, 2016, 2019)
  - (Japan) Kosuke Ota (2014, 2015)
  - (Japan) Yoshinori Muto (2014)
  - (Japan) Akihiro Hayashi (2019)
  - (Japan) Sei Muroya (2019)
  - (Japan) Kento Hashimoto (2019)
  - (Japan) Kensuke Nagai (2019)
  - (Brazil) Diego Oliveira (2019)
- Individual Fair Play Award:
  - (Japan) Naohiro Ishikawa (2003)
  - (Japan) Teruyuki Moniwa (2005)
  - (Japan) Yota Akimoto (2016)
- J.League Goal of the Year:
  - (Japan) Ryōma Watanabe against Cerezo Osaka (15 April 2023)
- J.League Cup MVP
  - (Japan) Yoichi Doi (2004)
  - (Japan) Takuji Yonemoto (2009)
  - (Brazil) Leandro (2020)
- J.League Cup New Hero Award
  - (Japan) Yukihiko Sato (1999)
  - (Japan) Takuji Yonemoto (2009)

=== FIFA World Cup players ===
The following players have represented their country at the FIFA World Cup whilst playing for FC Tokyo:

- (Japan) Teruyuki Moniwa (2006)
- (Japan) Yoichi Doi (2006)
- (Japan) Yasuyuki Konno (2010)
- (Japan) Yūto Nagatomo (2010,2022,2026)
- (Japan) Shūichi Gonda (2014)
- (Japan) Masato Morishige (2014)

=== Olympic players ===
The following players have represented their country at the Summer Olympic Games whilst playing for FC Tokyo:

- (Japan) Naohiro Ishikawa (2004)
- (Japan) Teruyuki Moniwa (2004)
- (Japan) Yasuyuki Konno (2004)
- (Japan) Yūhei Tokunaga (2004, 2012)
- (Japan) Yōhei Kajiyama (2008)
- (Japan) Yūto Nagatomo (2008)
- (Japan) Shūichi Gonda (2012)
- (Japan) Sei Muroya (2016)
- (Japan) Shōya Nakajima (2016)

== Managerial history ==
Manager	Period	Honours
(Japan) Kiyoshi Okuma	1 January 1995–31 December 2001	
(Netherlands) Tahseen Jabbary	20 February 1998–31 August 1998	– 1998 Japan Football League
(Japan) Hiromi Hara	1 January 2002–19 December 2005	– 2004 J.League Cup
(Brazil) Alexandre Gallo	20 December 2005–14 August 2006	
(Japan) Hisao Kuramata	15 August 2006–6 December 2006	
(Japan) Hiromi Hara (2)	7 December 2006–31 December 2007	
(Japan) Hiroshi Jofuku	1 January 2008–19 September 2010	– 2009 J.League Cup – 2010 J.League Cup / Copa Sudamericana Championship
(Japan) Kiyoshi Okuma (2)	20 September 2010–2 January 2012	– 2011 J2 League – 2011 Emperor's Cup
(Serbia) Ranko Popović	2 January 2012–31 December 2013	
(Italy) Massimo Ficcadenti	2 January 2014–31 December 2015	
(Japan) Hiroshi Jofuku (2)	1 January 2016–24 July 2016	
(Japan) Yoshiyuki Shinoda	26 July 2016–10 September 2017	
(Japan) Takayoshi Amma	11 September 2017–3 December 2017	
(Japan) Kenta Hasegawa	3 December 2017–7 November 2021	– 2020 J.League Cup
(Japan) Shinichi Morishita	7 November 2021–31 January 2022	
(Spain) Albert Puig	1 February 2022–14 June 2023	
(Australia) Peter Cklamovski	20 June 2023–31 December 2024	
(Japan) Rikizo Matsuhashi	1 February 2025–present	

== Season by season record ==
Champions	Runners-up	Third place	Promoted	Relegated

League													J.League Cup	Emperor's Cup	AFC CL
Season	Division	Teams	Pos.	Plays	W(OTW)	D	L(OTL)	F	A	GD	Points	Attendance/G	J.League Cup	Emperor's Cup	AFC CL
1999	J2	10	2nd	36	19 (2)	3	10 (2)	51	35	16	64	3,498	Semi-final	4th round	Did not qualify
2000	J1	16	7th	30	12 (3)	1	12 (2)	47	41	6	43	11,807	2nd round	3rd round	Did not qualify
2001	J1	16	8th	30	10 (3)	5	11 (1)	47	47	0	41	22,313	2nd round	3rd round	Did not qualify
2002	J1	16	9th	30	11 (2)	2	15	43	46	-3	39	22,173	Quarter final	3rd round	Did not qualify
2003	J1	16	4th	30	13	10	7	46	31	15	49	24,932	Quarter final	4th round	Did not qualify
2004	J1	16	8th	30	10	11	9	40	41	-1	41	25,438	Winner	Quarter final	Did not qualify
2005	J1	18	10th	34	11	14	9	43	40	3	47	27,101	Group stage	5th round	Did not qualify
2006	J1	18	13th	34	13	4	17	56	65	-9	43	24,096	Group stage	5th round	Did not qualify
2007	J1	18	12th	34	14	3	17	49	58	-9	45	25,290	Group stage	Quarter final	Did not qualify
2008	J1	18	6th	34	16	7	11	50	46	4	55	25,716	Quarter final	Semi-final	Did not qualify
2009	J1	18	5th	34	16	5	13	47	39	8	53	25,884	Winner	4th round	Did not qualify
2010	J1	18	16th	34	8	12	14	36	41	-5	36	25,112	Quarter final	Semi-final	Did not qualify
2011	J2	20	1st	38	23	8	7	67	22	45	77	17,562	-	Winner	Did not qualify
2012	J1	18	10th	34	14	6	14	47	44	3	48	23,955	Semi final	2nd round	Round of 16
2013	J1	18	8th	34	16	6	12	61	47	14	54	25,073	Group stage	Semi-final	Did not qualify
2014	J1	18	9th	34	12	12	10	47	33	14	48	25,187	Group stage	Round of 16	Did not qualify
2015	J1	18	4th	34	19	6	9	45	33	12	63	28,784	Quarter final	Quarter final	Did not qualify
2016	J1	18	9th	34	15	7	12	39	39	0	52	24,037	Semi final	Quarter final	Round of 16
2017	J1	18	13th	34	10	10	14	37	42	-5	40	26,490	Quarter final	2nd round	Did not qualify
2018	J1	18	6th	34	14	8	12	39	34	5	50	25,745	Group stage	4th round	Did not qualify
2019	J1	18	2nd	34	19	7	8	46	29	17	64	31,540	Quarter final	3rd round	Did not qualify
2020 †	J1	18	6th	34	17	6	11	47	42	5	57	5,912	Winner	Did not qualify	Round of 16
2021 †	J1	20	9th	38	15	8	15	49	53	-4	53	7,138	Semi-final	2nd round	Did not qualify
2022	J1	18	6th	34	14	7	13	46	43	3	49	22,309	Group stage	3rd round	Did not qualify
2023	J1	18	11th	34	12	7	15	42	46	-4	43	29,410	Quarter-final	Round of 16	Did not qualify
2024	J1	20	7th	38	15	9	14	53	51	2	54	33,225	Playoff round	Third round	Did not qualify
2025	J1	20	11th	38	13	11	14	41	48	-7	50	30,010	3rd round	Quarter-finals	Did not qualify
2026	J1	10	TBD	18									N/A	N/A	
2026-27	J1	20	TBD	38									TBD	TBD	

Key

- Pos. = Position in league; P = Games played; W = Games won; D = Games drawn; L = Games lost; F = Goals scored; A = Goals conceded; GD = Goals difference; Pts = Points gained
- Attendance/G = Average home league attendance
- † 2020 & 2021 seasons attendances reduced by COVID-19 worldwide pandemic
- Source: J.League Data Site

== Continental record ==
Season	Competition	Round	Club	Home	Away	Aggregate
2012	AFC Champions League	Group F	(Australia) Brisbane Roar	4–2	0–2	2nd
2012	AFC Champions League	Group F	(South Korea) Ulsan Hyundai	2–2	1–0	2nd
2012	AFC Champions League	Group F	(China) Beijing Guoan	3–0	1–1	2nd
2012	AFC Champions League	Round of 16	(China) Guangzhou Evergrande	1–0		
2016	AFC Champions League	Play-off round	(Thailand) Chonburi	9–0		
2016	AFC Champions League	Group E	(South Korea) Jeonbuk Hyundai Motors	0–3	2–1	2nd
2016	AFC Champions League	Group E	(Vietnam) Becamex Bình Dương	3–1	1–2	2nd
2016	AFC Champions League	Group E	(China) Jiangsu Suning	0–0	1–2	2nd
2016	AFC Champions League	Round of 16	(China) Shanghai SIPG	2–1	1–0	2–2 (a)
2020	AFC Champions League	Play-off round	(Philippines) Ceres-Negros	2–0		
2020	AFC Champions League	Group F	(South Korea) Ulsan Hyundai	1–2	1–1	2nd
2020	AFC Champions League	Group F	(Australia) Perth Glory	1–0	0–1	2nd
2020	AFC Champions League	Group F	(China) Shanghai Shenhua	0–1	1–2	2nd
2020	AFC Champions League	Round of 16	(China) Beijing Guoan	1–0		

== See also ==
- FC Tokyo (volleyball)
- FC Tokyo U23
