= 2000 J.League Division 1 =

8th season of J1 League

J.League Division 1
- Season: 2000
- Champions: Kashima Antlers; 3rd J.League title 3rd Japanese title
- Relegated: Kyoto Purple Sanga; Kawasaki Frontale
- Asian Club Championship: Kashima Antlers
- Matches: 240
- Goals: 712 (2.97 per match)
- Top goalscorer: Masashi Nakayama (20 goals)
- Highest attendance: 50,399 – Antlers vs. Reysol (November 26)
- Lowest attendance: 2,738 – Vissel vs. Verdy (April 15)
- Average attendance: 11,065

The 2000 J.League Division 1 season was the eighth season of the J.League Division 1. The league began on March 11 and ended on November 26. At the end of the season, the second stage winner Kashima Antlers won the Suntory Championship against Yokohama F. Marinos who won the first stage.

== Clubs ==
The following 16 clubs participated in Division 1 during 2000 season. Of these clubs, Kawasaki Frontale and FC Tokyo were promoted from Division 2.

- Avispa Fukuoka
- Cerezo Osaka
- FC Tokyo
- Gamba Osaka
- JEF United Ichihara
- Júbilo Iwata
- Kashima Antlers
- Kashiwa Reysol
- Kawasaki Frontale
- Kyoto Purple Sanga
- Nagoya Grampus Eight
- Sanfrecce Hiroshima
- Shimizu S-Pulse
- Verdy Kawasaki
- Vissel Kobe
- Yokohama F. Marinos

=== Personnel ===
Club	Head coach
Avispa Fukuoka	(Argentina) Nestor Omar Piccoli
Cerezo Osaka	(Japan) Hiroshi Soejima
FC Tokyo	(Japan) Kiyoshi Okuma
Gamba Osaka	(Japan) Hiroshi Hayano
JEF United Ichihara	(Slovenia) Zdenko Verdenik
Júbilo Iwata	(Japan) Masakazu Suzuki
Kashima Antlers	(Brazil) Toninho Cerezo
Kashiwa Reysol	(Japan) Akira Nishino
Kawasaki Frontale	(Japan) Hiroshi Kobayashi
Kyoto Purple Sanga	(Germany) Gert Engels
Nagoya Grampus Eight	(Brazil) João Carlos
Sanfrecce Hiroshima	(Scotland) Eddie Thomson
Shimizu S-Pulse	(England) Steve Perryman
Verdy Kawasaki	(South Korea) Chang Woe-ryong
Vissel Kobe	(Japan) Ryoichi Kawakatsu
Yokohama F. Marinos	(Argentina) Osvaldo Ardiles

=== Foreign players ===
Club	Player 1	Player 2	Player 3	Non-visa foreign	Type-C contract	Former players
Avispa Fukuoka	(Argentina) David Bisconti	(Argentina) Eduardo Bustos Montoya	(Romania) Pavel Badea			
Cerezo Osaka	(Brazil) Pericles	(South Korea) Noh Jung-yoon	(South Korea) Yoon Jong-hwan			
FC Tokyo	(Brazil) Amaral	(Brazil) Tuto		(Brazil) Sandro		
Gamba Osaka	(Brazil) Reginaldo	(Croatia) Nino Bule	(French Guiana) Claude Dambury			(Brazil) Andradina
JEF United Ichihara	(Brazil) Baron	(Ghana) Owusu Benson	(Romania) Cosmin Olăroiu			(Romania) Ovidiu Burcă (South Korea) Kim Myung-hwi
Júbilo Iwata	(Federal Republic of Yugoslavia) Aleksandar Živković	(Netherlands) Arno van Zwam	(Russia) Dmitri Radchenko			(Paraguay) Roberto Torres
Kashima Antlers	(Brazil) Bismarck	(Brazil) Fabiano				(Brazil) Bebeto
Kashiwa Reysol	(Brazil) Maurício	(South Korea) Hong Myung-bo	(South Korea) Hwang Sun-hong			(Federal Republic of Yugoslavia) Saša Drakulić (South Korea) Park Kun-ha
Kawasaki Frontale	(Brazil) Daniel Rossi	(Brazil) Paulo Isidoro	(Brazil) Ricardinho		(Brazil) Luiz	(Brazil) Mazinho (Brazil) Pedrinho (Paraguay) Guido Alvarenga
Kyoto Purple Sanga	(Brazil) Edinho Baiano	(Brazil) Régis Pitbull	(South Korea) Park Ji-sung			(Brazil) Fabrício
Nagoya Grampus Eight	(Brazil) Ueslei	(Federal Republic of Yugoslavia) Dragan Stojković	(Netherlands) Tarik Oulida	(Bolivia) Ko Ishikawa		(Brazil) Romildo
Sanfrecce Hiroshima	(Australia) Steve Corica	(Australia) Tony Popovic	(Portugal) Miguel Simão			
Shimizu S-Pulse	(Argentina) Fernando Oliva	(Brazil) Santos		(Brazil) Alex	(England) Stuart Thurgood	(Brazil) Fabinho
Verdy Kawasaki	(South Korea) Kim Do-keun	(South Korea) Kim Hyun-seok		(North Korea) Ryang Kyu-sa		
Vissel Kobe	(Brazil) Fabinho	(South Korea) Choi Sung-yong	(South Korea) Ha Seok-ju			
Yokohama F. Marinos	(Brazil) Edmílson Matias	(Croatia) Goran Jurić	(South Korea) Yoo Sang-chul			(Argentina) Raul Maldonado (Morocco) Abdeljalil Hadda (South Korea) Sin Byung-ho

== Overview ==
=== First stage ===
Pos	Team	Pld	W	OTW	D	OTL	L	GF	GA	GD	Pts	Qualification
1	(Kanagawa Prefecture) Yokohama F. Marinos	15	10	0	0	1	4	32	21	+11	30	Qualification to the Suntory Championship 2000
2	(Osaka Prefecture) Cerezo Osaka	15	9	1	0	1	4	34	25	+9	29	
3	(Shizuoka Prefecture) Shimizu S-Pulse	15	8	2	0	1	4	21	17	+4	28	
4	(Chiba Prefecture) Kashiwa Reysol	15	6	4	0	1	4	25	22	+3	26	
5	(Shizuoka Prefecture) Júbilo Iwata (Note: Champion from 1999 J.League Division 1)	15	7	2	0	3	3	32	25	+7	25	
6	FC Tokyo (Note: Promoted from 1999 J.League Division 2)	15	7	1	0	1	6	24	22	+2	23	
7	(Hyōgo Prefecture) Vissel Kobe	15	7	0	1	1	6	21	17	+4	22	
8	(Ibaraki Prefecture) Kashima Antlers	15	6	2	0	0	7	20	17	+3	22	
9	(Tokyo) Verdy Kawasaki	15	5	2	1	3	4	26	23	+3	20	
10	(Hiroshima Prefecture) Sanfrecce Hiroshima	15	4	3	1	1	6	17	15	+2	19	
11	(Chiba Prefecture) JEF United Ichihara	15	6	0	1	2	6	22	22	0	19	
12	(Aichi Prefecture) Nagoya Grampus Eight (Note: Cup-Winner 1999 Emperor's Cup)	15	4	3	1	2	5	17	18	−1	19	
13	(Osaka Prefecture) Gamba Osaka	15	5	0	2	2	6	20	23	−3	17	
14	(Fukuoka Prefecture) Avispa Fukuoka	15	3	3	0	1	8	19	28	−9	15	
15	(Kanagawa Prefecture) Kawasaki Frontale	15	2	1	2	0	10	14	29	−15	10	
16	(Kyoto Prefecture) Kyoto Purple Sanga	15	2	0	1	4	8	16	36	−20	7	

Source: RSSSF

=== Second stage ===
Pos	Team	Pld	W	OTW	D	OTL	L	GF	GA	GD	Pts	Qualification
1	Kashima Antlers	15	9	1	4	1	0	28	10	+18	33	Qualification to the Suntory Championship 2000
2	Kashiwa Reysol	15	9	2	1	0	3	23	10	+13	32	
3	Júbilo Iwata (Note: Champion from 1999 J.League Division 1)	15	10	0	0	1	4	35	17	+18	30	
4	Gamba Osaka	15	8	2	0	1	4	27	20	+7	28	
5	Yokohama F. Marinos	15	7	1	1	1	5	24	24	0	24	
6	Avispa Fukuoka	15	6	1	2	4	2	22	20	+2	22	
7	Nagoya Grampus Eight (Note: Cup-Winner 1999 Emperor's Cup)	15	7	0	1	2	5	25	27	−2	22	
8	FC Tokyo (Note: Promoted from 1999 J.League Division 2)	15	5	2	1	1	6	23	19	+4	20	
9	Cerezo Osaka	15	5	2	0	1	7	20	24	−4	19	
10	Verdy Kawasaki	15	5	0	3	1	6	20	21	−1	18	
11	Sanfrecce Hiroshima	15	5	1	1	3	5	23	25	−2	18	
12	Kyoto Purple Sanga	15	5	1	1	1	7	23	30	−7	18	
13	Shimizu S-Pulse	15	2	3	2	0	8	13	19	−6	14	
14	Vissel Kobe	15	3	1	0	1	10	19	32	−13	11	
15	Kawasaki Frontale	15	1	3	2	0	9	12	27	−15	11	
16	JEF United Ichihara	15	2	1	1	3	8	15	27	−12	9	

Source: RSSSF

=== Suntory Championship ===
December 3, 2000
15:02

Yokohama F. Marinos	0 – 0	Kashima Antlers

International Stadium Yokohama
Attendance: 41,595
Referee: Leslie Mottram

December 10, 2000
19:34

Kashima Antlers	3 – 0	Yokohama F. Marinos
Suzuki 24'; Narahashi 39'; Nakata 44'

Tokyo National Stadium
Attendance: 44,665
Referee: Masayoshi Okada

== Overall table ==
Pos	Team	Pld	W	OTW	D	OTL	L	GF	GA	GD	Pts	Qualification or relegation
1	Kashima Antlers	30	15	3	4	1	7	48	27	+21	55	Champion and qualified to the Asian Club Championship 2001–02 First Round
2	Yokohama F. Marinos	30	17	1	1	2	9	56	45	+11	54	
3	Kashiwa Reysol	30	15	6	1	1	7	48	32	+16	58	
4	Júbilo Iwata (Note: Champion from 1999 J.League Division 1)	30	17	2	0	4	7	67	42	+25	55	
5	Cerezo Osaka	30	14	3	0	2	11	54	49	+5	48	
6	Gamba Osaka	30	13	2	2	3	10	47	43	+4	45	
7	FC Tokyo (Note: Promoted from 1999 J.League Division 2)	30	12	3	1	2	12	47	41	+6	43	
8	Shimizu S-Pulse	30	10	5	2	1	12	34	36	−2	42	Runners-Up 2000 Emperor's Cup and qualified to the Asian Cup Winners' Cup 2002 Second Round (Note: Kashima Antlers is Winner of the Emperor's Cup 2000 and has qualified as Champion of J.League 2000 to the Asian Club Championship 2001–02, therefore Shimizu S-Pulse got the spot as Runners-Up in Emperor's Cup 2000 to the Asian Cup Winners' Cup 2002 Second Round)
9	Nagoya Grampus Eight (Note: Cup-Winner 1999 Emperor's Cup)	30	11	3	2	4	10	42	45	−3	41	
10	Verdy Kawasaki	30	10	2	4	4	10	46	44	+2	38	
11	Sanfrecce Hiroshima	30	9	4	2	4	11	40	40	0	37	
12	Avispa Fukuoka	30	9	4	2	5	10	41	48	−7	37	
13	Vissel Kobe	30	10	1	1	2	16	40	49	−9	33	
14	JEF United Ichihara	30	8	1	2	5	14	37	49	−12	28	
15	Kyoto Purple Sanga	30	7	1	2	5	15	39	66	−27	25	Relegated to the 2001 J.League Division 2
16	Kawasaki Frontale	30	3	4	4	0	19	26	56	−30	21	Relegated to the 2001 J.League Division 2

Source: RSSSF
