= 1999 Nagoya Grampus Eight season =

Nagoya Grampus Eight
1999 season
- Manager: (Japan) Koji Tanaka; (France) Sanchez; (Brazil) Mazarópi; (Brazil) João Carlos
- Stadium: Mizuho Athletic Stadium
- J.League 1: 4th
- Emperor's Cup: Champions
- J.League Cup: Semifinals
- Top goalscorer: Wagner Lopes (13)
Home colours	Away colours

1999 Nagoya Grampus Eight season

== Competitions ==
Competitions	Position
J.League 1	4th / 16 clubs
Emperor's Cup	Champions
J.League Cup	Semifinals

== Domestic results ==
=== J.League 1 ===
6 March 1999 1-1	Nagoya Grampus Eight	1-0	Avispa Fukuoka	Mizuho Athletic Stadium
JST (UTC+09)

13 March 1999 1-2	Gamba Osaka	3-2 (GG) (a.e.t.)	Nagoya Grampus Eight	Osaka Expo '70 Stadium
JST (UTC+09)

20 March 1999 1-3	Nagoya Grampus Eight	0-0 (GG) (a.e.t.)	JEF United Ichihara	Mizuho Athletic Stadium
JST (UTC+09)

27 March 1999 1-4	Vissel Kobe	0-2	Nagoya Grampus Eight	Kobe Universiade Memorial Stadium
JST (UTC+09)

3 April 1999 1-5	Nagoya Grampus Eight	0-2	Sanfrecce Hiroshima	Mizuho Athletic Stadium
JST (UTC+09)

10 April 1999 1-6	Verdy Kawasaki	2-1	Nagoya Grampus Eight	Todoroki Athletics Stadium
JST (UTC+09)

17 April 1999 1-7	Nagoya Grampus Eight	3-1	Bellmare Hiratsuka	Mizuho Athletic Stadium
JST (UTC+09)

24 April 1999 1-8	Kyoto Purple Sanga	1-2	Nagoya Grampus Eight	Nishikyogoku Athletic Stadium
JST (UTC+09)

28 April 1999 1-9	Nagoya Grampus Eight	0-1 (GG) (a.e.t.)	Kashiwa Reysol	Mizuho Athletic Stadium
JST (UTC+09)

1 May 1999 1-10	Yokohama F. Marinos	4-3 (GG) (a.e.t.)	Nagoya Grampus Eight	International Stadium Yokohama
JST (UTC+09)

5 May 1999 1-11	Nagoya Grampus Eight	3-4	Shimizu S-Pulse	Gifu Nagaragawa Stadium
JST (UTC+09)

8 May 1999 1-12	Cerezo Osaka	1-2	Nagoya Grampus Eight	Kintetsu Hanazono Rugby Stadium
JST (UTC+09)

15 May 1999 1-13	Nagoya Grampus Eight	1-2	Júbilo Iwata	Mizuho Athletic Stadium
JST (UTC+09)

22 May 1999 1-14	Kashima Antlers	1-2 (GG) (a.e.t.)	Nagoya Grampus Eight	Tokyo National Stadium
JST (UTC+09)

29 May 1999 1-15	Nagoya Grampus Eight	8-1	Urawa Red Diamonds	Mizuho Athletic Stadium
JST (UTC+09)

7 August 1999 2-1	Bellmare Hiratsuka	4-2	Nagoya Grampus Eight	Hiratsuka Athletics Stadium
JST (UTC+09)

14 August 1999 2-2	Nagoya Grampus Eight	0-3	Kyoto Purple Sanga	Mizuho Athletic Stadium
JST (UTC+09)

18 August 1999 2-3	Kashiwa Reysol	1-2	Nagoya Grampus Eight	Tokyo National Stadium
JST (UTC+09)

21 August 1999 2-4	Nagoya Grampus Eight	2-2 (GG) (a.e.t.)	Yokohama F. Marinos	Mizuho Rugby Stadium
JST (UTC+09)

28 August 1999 2-5	Shimizu S-Pulse	4-3	Nagoya Grampus Eight	Nihondaira Sports Stadium
JST (UTC+09)

4 September 1999 2-6	Nagoya Grampus Eight	3-2	Cerezo Osaka	Mizuho Athletic Stadium
JST (UTC+09)

11 September 1999 2-7	Júbilo Iwata	1-2	Nagoya Grampus Eight	Júbilo Iwata Stadium
JST (UTC+09)

15 September 1999 2-8	Nagoya Grampus Eight	3-1	Kashima Antlers	Mizuho Athletic Stadium
JST (UTC+09)

18 September 1999 2-9	Urawa Red Diamonds	1-2 (GG) (a.e.t.)	Nagoya Grampus Eight	Urawa Komaba Stadium
JST (UTC+09)

23 September 1999 2-10	Avispa Fukuoka	1-3	Nagoya Grampus Eight	Hakatanomori Football Stadium
JST (UTC+09)

30 October 1999 2-11	JEF United Ichihara	1-2	Nagoya Grampus Eight	Ichihara Seaside Stadium
JST (UTC+09)

17 November 1999 2-12	Nagoya Grampus Eight	2-1	Gamba Osaka	Mizuho Athletic Stadium
JST (UTC+09)

20 November 1999 2-13	Nagoya Grampus Eight	4-1	Verdy Kawasaki	Mizuho Athletic Stadium
JST (UTC+09)

23 November 1999 2-14	Sanfrecce Hiroshima	0-1	Nagoya Grampus Eight	Hiroshima Big Arch
JST (UTC+09)

27 November 1999 2-15	Nagoya Grampus Eight	1-0	Vissel Kobe	Mizuho Athletic Stadium
JST (UTC+09)

=== Emperor's Cup ===
1st Round	bye

2nd Round	bye

12 December 1999 3rd Round	Nagoya Grampus Eight	4-0	Sony Sendai	Mizuho Athletic Stadium
JST (UTC+09)

19 December 1999 4th Round	Kashima Antlers	1-2	Nagoya Grampus Eight	Mizuho Athletic Stadium
JST (UTC+09)

23 December 1999 Quarterfinals	Júbilo Iwata	0-1	Nagoya Grampus Eight	Kumamoto Athletics Stadium
JST (UTC+09)

26 December 1999 Semifinals	Nagoya Grampus Eight	2-0	Kashiwa Reysol	Tokyo National Stadium
JST (UTC+09)

1 January 2000 Final	Nagoya Grampus Eight	2-0	Sanfrecce Hiroshima	Tokyo National Stadium
JST (UTC+09)

=== J.League Cup ===
1st Round	bye

12 June 1999 2nd Round-1	Verdy Kawasaki	0-3	Nagoya Grampus Eight	Iwate Athletic Stadium
JST (UTC+09)

19 June 1999 2nd Round-2	Nagoya Grampus Eight	4-2 (7-2 agg.)	Verdy Kawasaki	Mizuho Athletic Stadium
JST (UTC+09)

20 July 1999 Quarterfinals-1	Nagoya Grampus Eight	3-2	Shimizu S-Pulse	Mizuho Athletic Stadium
JST (UTC+09)

24 July 1999 Quarterfinals-2	Shimizu S-Pulse	0-0 (2-3 agg.)	Nagoya Grampus Eight	Nihondaira Sports Stadium
JST (UTC+09)

29 September 1999 Semifinals-1	Nagoya Grampus Eight	1-3	Kashiwa Reysol	Mizuho Athletic Stadium
JST (UTC+09)

6 October 1999 Semifinals-2	Kashiwa Reysol	1-2 (GG) (a.e.t.) (4-3 agg.)	Nagoya Grampus Eight	Hitachi Kashiwa Soccer Stadium
JST (UTC+09)

== Player statistics ==
No.	Pos.	Nat.	Player	D.o.B. (Age)	Height / Weight	J.League 1		Emperor's Cup		J.League Cup		Total	
No.	Pos.	Nat.	Player	D.o.B. (Age)	Height / Weight	Apps	Goals	Apps	Goals	Apps	Goals	Apps	Goals
1	GK	(Japan)	Seigo Narazaki	April 15, 1976 (aged 22)	cm / kg	25	0						
2	DF	(Japan)	Seiichi Ogawa	July 21, 1970 (aged 28)	cm / kg	11	1						
3	DF	(Japan)	Go Oiwa	June 23, 1972 (aged 26)	cm / kg	26	2						
4	DF	(Japan)	Kazuhisa Iijima	January 6, 1970 (aged 29)	cm / kg	9	0						
5	DF	(Brazil)	Alexandre Torres	August 22, 1966 (aged 32)	cm / kg	24	1						
6	MF	(Japan)	Motohiro Yamaguchi	January 29, 1969 (aged 30)	cm / kg	29	2						
7	MF	(Netherlands)	Tarik Oulida	January 19, 1974 (aged 25)	cm / kg	22	2						
8	MF	(Japan)	Tetsuya Asano	February 23, 1967 (aged 32)	cm / kg	13	1						
9	MF	(Japan)	Shigeyoshi Mochizuki	July 9, 1973 (aged 25)	cm / kg	29	6						
10	FW	(Serbia and Montenegro)	Dragan Stojković	March 3, 1965 (aged 34)	cm / kg	24	11						
11	MF	(Japan)	Takashi Hirano	July 15, 1974 (aged 24)	cm / kg	28	7						
12	MF	(Japan)	Tetsuhiro Kina	December 10, 1976 (aged 22)	cm / kg	0	0						
13	FW	(Japan)	Koji Noguchi	June 5, 1970 (aged 28)	cm / kg	6	0						
14	DF	(Japan)	Masahiro Koga	September 8, 1978 (aged 20)	cm / kg	26	2						
15	MF	(Japan)	Hiroki Mihara	April 20, 1978 (aged 20)	cm / kg	0	0						
16	GK	(Japan)	Yuji Ito	May 20, 1965 (aged 33)	cm / kg	7	0						
17	FW	(Japan)	Kenji Ito	June 29, 1976 (aged 22)	cm / kg	0	0						
18	FW	(Japan)	Kenji Fukuda	October 21, 1977 (aged 21)	cm / kg	24	10						
19	FW	(Japan)	Takafumi Ogura	July 6, 1973 (aged 25)	cm / kg	3	0						
20	MF	(Japan)	Suguru Ito	September 7, 1975 (aged 23)	cm / kg	1	0						
21	MF	(Japan)	Tetsuya Okayama	August 27, 1973 (aged 25)	cm / kg	22	3						
22	GK	(Japan)	Yasuhiro Tominaga	May 22, 1980 (aged 18)	cm / kg	0	0						
23	MF	(Japan)	Yuji Miyahara	July 19, 1980 (aged 18)	cm / kg	0	0						
24	DF	(Japan)	Hideaki Tominaga	August 27, 1976 (aged 22)	cm / kg	0	0						
25	DF	(Japan)	Masayuki Omori	November 9, 1976 (aged 22)	cm / kg	3	0						
26	DF	(Japan)	Kohei Yamamichi	May 11, 1980 (aged 18)	cm / kg	0	0						
27	DF	(Japan)	Yusuke Nakatani	September 22, 1978 (aged 20)	cm / kg	13	0						
28	MF	(Japan)	Kunihiko Takizawa	April 20, 1978 (aged 20)	cm / kg	0	0						
29	MF	(Japan)	Jiro Yabe	May 26, 1978 (aged 20)	cm / kg	0	0						
30	FW	(Japan)	Wagner Lopes	January 29, 1969 (aged 30)	cm / kg	23	13						
31	DF	(Japan)	Ko Ishikawa	March 10, 1970 (aged 28)	cm / kg	29	1						
32	GK	(Japan)	Hiroshi Sato	March 7, 1972 (aged 26)	cm / kg	0	0						

== Other pages ==
- (in Japanese) J.League official site
- (in Japanese) Nagoya Grampus official site: J1 League Part 1
- (in Japanese) Nagoya Grampus official site: J1 League Part 2
- (in Japanese) Nagoya Grampus official site: Emperor's Cup
- (in Japanese) Nagoya Grampus official site: J.League Cup
