= 2001 Nagoya Grampus Eight season =

Nagoya Grampus Eight
2001 season
- Manager: João Carlos; Tetsuro Miura
- Stadium: Mizuho Athletic Stadium
- J.League 1: 5th
- Emperor's Cup: 3rd Round
- J.League Cup: Semifinals
- Top goalscorer: Ueslei (21)
Home colours	Away colours	Third colours

2001 Nagoya Grampus Eight season

== Competitions ==
Competitions	Position
J.League 1	5th / 16 clubs
Emperor's Cup	3rd round
J.League Cup	Semifinals

== Domestic results ==
=== J.League 1 ===
10 March 2001 1-1	Nagoya Grampus Eight	2-0	Urawa Red Diamonds	Mizuho Rugby Stadium
JST (UTC+09)

17 March 2001 1-2	JEF United Ichihara	1-2 (GG) (a.e.t.)	Nagoya Grampus Eight	Ichihara Seaside Stadium
JST (UTC+09)

31 March 2001 1-3	Nagoya Grampus Eight	1-1 (GG) (a.e.t.)	Yokohama F. Marinos	Mizuho Athletic Stadium
JST (UTC+09)

7 April 2001 1-4	FC Tokyo	0-1	Nagoya Grampus Eight	Tokyo Stadium
JST (UTC+09)

14 April 2001 1-5	Nagoya Grampus Eight	2-1 (GG) (a.e.t.)	Kashima Antlers	Mizuho Athletic Stadium
JST (UTC+09)

29 April 2001 1-6	Júbilo Iwata	3-0	Nagoya Grampus Eight	Júbilo Iwata Stadium
JST (UTC+09)

3 May 2001 1-7	Nagoya Grampus Eight	3-1	Cerezo Osaka	Mizuho Athletic Stadium
JST (UTC+09)

6 May 2001 1-8	Nagoya Grampus Eight	0-2	Vissel Kobe	Mizuho Athletic Stadium
JST (UTC+09)

12 May 2001 1-9	Gamba Osaka	2-3 (GG) (a.e.t.)	Nagoya Grampus Eight	Osaka Expo '70 Stadium
JST (UTC+09)

11 July 2001 1-10	Nagoya Grampus Eight	2-1 (GG) (a.e.t.)	Shimizu S-Pulse	Mizuho Athletic Stadium
JST (UTC+09)

16 June 2001 1-11	Consadole Sapporo	2-2 (GG) (a.e.t.)	Nagoya Grampus Eight	Sapporo Atsubetsu Park Stadium
JST (UTC+09)

23 June 2001 1-12	Nagoya Grampus Eight	1-4	Kashiwa Reysol	Mizuho Athletic Stadium
JST (UTC+09)

7 July 2001 1-13	Avispa Fukuoka	0-4	Nagoya Grampus Eight	Hakatanomori Football Stadium
JST (UTC+09)

14 July 2001 1-14	Nagoya Grampus Eight	3-2 (GG) (a.e.t.)	Sanfrecce Hiroshima	Mizuho Athletic Stadium
JST (UTC+09)

21 July 2001 1-15	Tokyo Verdy 1969	0-3	Nagoya Grampus Eight	Tokyo Stadium
JST (UTC+09)

11 August 2001 2-1	Nagoya Grampus Eight	3-2	Gamba Osaka	Mizuho Athletic Stadium
JST (UTC+09)

18 August 2001 2-2	Vissel Kobe	2-1	Nagoya Grampus Eight	Kobe Universiade Memorial Stadium
JST (UTC+09)

25 August 2001 2-3	Nagoya Grampus Eight	3-2	Tokyo Verdy 1969	Mizuho Athletic Stadium
JST (UTC+09)

8 September 2001 2-4	Sanfrecce Hiroshima	2-4	Nagoya Grampus Eight	Hiroshima Big Arch
JST (UTC+09)

15 September 2001 2-5	Cerezo Osaka	0-2	Nagoya Grampus Eight	Osaka Nagai Stadium
JST (UTC+09)

22 September 2001 2-6	Nagoya Grampus Eight	0-2	Júbilo Iwata	Toyota Stadium
JST (UTC+09)

29 September 2001 2-7	Kashima Antlers	4-2	Nagoya Grampus Eight	Kashima Soccer Stadium
JST (UTC+09)

13 October 2001 2-8	Nagoya Grampus Eight	1-1 (GG) (a.e.t.)	FC Tokyo	Toyota Stadium
JST (UTC+09)

17 October 2001 2-9	Yokohama F. Marinos	2-0	Nagoya Grampus Eight	International Stadium Yokohama
JST (UTC+09)

20 October 2001 2-10	Shimizu S-Pulse	2-1 (GG) (a.e.t.)	Nagoya Grampus Eight	Nihondaira Sports Stadium
JST (UTC+09)

31 October 2001 2-11	Nagoya Grampus Eight	2-0	Consadole Sapporo	Mizuho Athletic Stadium
JST (UTC+09)

3 November 2001 2-12	Kashiwa Reysol	3-2	Nagoya Grampus Eight	Hitachi Kashiwa Soccer Stadium
JST (UTC+09)

10 November 2001 2-13	Nagoya Grampus Eight	1-0	Avispa Fukuoka	Mizuho Athletic Stadium
JST (UTC+09)

17 November 2001 2-14	Nagoya Grampus Eight	5-1	JEF United Ichihara	Mizuho Athletic Stadium
JST (UTC+09)

24 November 2001 2-15	Urawa Red Diamonds	2-0	Nagoya Grampus Eight	Urawa Komaba Stadium
JST (UTC+09)

=== Emperor's Cup ===
1st Round	bye

2nd Round	bye

9 December 2001 3rd Round	Nagoya Grampus Eight	0-4	Sagawa Express	Mizuho Athletic Stadium
JST (UTC+09)

=== J.League Cup ===
1st Round	bye

13 June 2001 2nd Round-1	Vissel Kobe	2-2	Nagoya Grampus Eight	Kobe Universiade Memorial Stadium
JST (UTC+09)

20 June 2001 2nd Round-2	Nagoya Grampus Eight	2-1 (4-3 agg.)	Vissel Kobe	Mizuho Athletic Stadium
JST (UTC+09)

8 August 2001 Quarterfinals-1	Sanfrecce Hiroshima	2-3	Nagoya Grampus Eight	Hiroshima Stadium
JST (UTC+09)

22 August 2001 Quarterfinals-2	Nagoya Grampus Eight	1-0 (4-2 agg.)	Sanfrecce Hiroshima	Mizuho Athletic Stadium
JST (UTC+09)

26 September 2001 Semifinals-1	Nagoya Grampus Eight	0-1	Yokohama F. Marinos	Mizuho Athletic Stadium
JST (UTC+09)

10 October 2001 Semifinals-2	Yokohama F. Marinos	0-0 (1-0 agg.)	Nagoya Grampus Eight	Yokohama Mitsuzawa Stadium
JST (UTC+09)

== International results ==
=== Asian Cup Winners' Cup ===
Nagoya Grampus Eight qualified for this tournament as winners of the 1999 Emperor's Cup

Second round

September 2000 1st Leg	Nagoya Grampus Eight (Japan)	3–1	(Hong Kong) Happy Valley AA	Nagoya, Japan
		Report		Stadium: Nagoya Mizuho Athletics Stadium

September 2000 2nd Leg	Happy Valley AA (Hong Kong)	0–3 (1–6 agg.)	(Japan) Nagoya Grampus Eight	Hong Kong
		Report

Quarterfinals

7 March 2001 1st Leg	Dalian Shide (China)	0–0	(Japan) Nagoya Grampus Eight	Dalian, PR China
		Report		Stadium: Jinzhou Stadium

14 March 2001 2nd Leg	Nagoya Grampus Eight (Japan)	1–1 (1–1a agg.)	(China) Dalian Shide	Nagoya, Japan
		Report		Stadium: Nagoya Mizuho Athletics Stadium

== Player statistics ==
No.	Pos.	Nat.	Player	D.o.B. (Age)	Height / Weight	J.League 1		Emperor's Cup		J.League Cup		Total	
No.	Pos.	Nat.	Player	D.o.B. (Age)	Height / Weight	Apps	Goals	Apps	Goals	Apps	Goals	Apps	Goals
1	GK	(Japan)	Seigo Narazaki	April 15, 1976 (aged 24)	cm / kg	28	0						
2	DF	(Japan)	Keiji Kaimoto	November 26, 1972 (aged 28)	cm / kg	21	0						
3	DF	(Japan)	Yasunari Hiraoka	March 13, 1972 (aged 28)	cm / kg	21	1						
4	DF	(Japan)	Masayuki Omori	November 9, 1976 (aged 24)	cm / kg	25	0						
5	DF	(Japan)	Masahiro Koga	September 8, 1978 (aged 22)	cm / kg	18	0						
6	MF	(Japan)	Motohiro Yamaguchi	January 29, 1969 (aged 32)	cm / kg	28	1						
7	MF	(Netherlands)	Tarik Oulida	January 19, 1974 (aged 27)	cm / kg	28	2						
8	MF	(Japan)	Tomoyuki Sakai	June 29, 1979 (aged 21)	cm / kg	25	3						
9	FW	(Japan)	Kenji Fukuda	October 21, 1977 (aged 23)	cm / kg	8	2						
10	FW	(Serbia and Montenegro)	Dragan Stojković	March 3, 1965 (aged 36)	cm / kg	15	3						
11	FW	(Brazil)	Ueslei	April 19, 1972 (aged 28)	cm / kg	28	21						
13	MF	(Japan)	Kunihiko Takizawa	April 20, 1978 (aged 22)	cm / kg	16	0						
14	DF	(Japan)	Naoki Hiraoka	May 24, 1973 (aged 27)	cm / kg	12	2						
15	FW	(Japan)	Yasuyuki Moriyama	May 1, 1969 (aged 31)	cm / kg	26	12						
16	GK	(Japan)	Seiji Honda	February 25, 1976 (aged 25)	cm / kg	2	0						
17	MF	(Japan)	Yuji Miyahara	July 19, 1980 (aged 20)	cm / kg	0	0						
18	DF	(Japan)	Junji Nishizawa	May 10, 1974 (aged 26)	cm / kg	17	0						
19	DF	(Japan)	Ko Ishikawa	March 10, 1970 (aged 31)	cm / kg	15	0						
20	FW	(Japan)	Ryuta Hara	April 19, 1981 (aged 19)	cm / kg	2	1						
21	MF	(Japan)	Tetsuya Okayama	August 27, 1973 (aged 27)	cm / kg	23	2						
22	GK	(Japan)	Yasuhiro Tominaga	May 22, 1980 (aged 20)	cm / kg	0	0						
23	FW	(Brazil)	Marcelo Ramos	June 25, 1973 (aged 27)	cm / kg	13	3						
24	DF	(Japan)	Takafumi Yoshimoto	May 13, 1978 (aged 22)	cm / kg	1	0						
25	MF	(Japan)	Naoshi Nakamura	January 27, 1979 (aged 22)	cm / kg	11	1						
26	DF	(Japan)	Yusuke Nakatani	September 22, 1978 (aged 22)	cm / kg	14	0						
27	MF	(Japan)	Masahiro Iwata	September 23, 1981 (aged 19)	cm / kg	1	0						
28	MF	(Japan)	Kenji Hada	June 27, 1981 (aged 19)	cm / kg	0	0						
29	MF	(Japan)	Taku Harada	October 27, 1982 (aged 18)	cm / kg	3	0						
30	GK	(Japan)	Hiroshi Sato	March 7, 1972 (aged 29)	cm / kg	0	0						
31	GK	(Japan)	Kazuki Sawada	June 5, 1982 (aged 18)	cm / kg	0	0						
32	DF	(Japan)	Yuki Yamauchi	May 10, 1982 (aged 18)	cm / kg	0	0						
33	DF	(Japan)	Taisei Fujita	January 31, 1982 (aged 19)	cm / kg	3	0						
34	MF	(Japan)	Hiroki Mihara	April 20, 1978 (aged 22)	cm / kg	0	0						
35	MF	(Brazil)	Adriano Pimenta	November 14, 1982 (aged 18)	cm / kg	1	0						
