= 2000 Nagoya Grampus Eight season =

Nagoya Grampus Eight
2000 season
- Manager: João Carlos
- Stadium: Mizuho Athletic Stadium
- J.League 1: 9th
- Emperor's Cup: 4th Round
- J.League Cup: Semifinals
- Top goalscorer: Wagner Lopes (10)
Home colours	Away colours

2000 Nagoya Grampus Eight season

== Competitions ==
Competitions	Position
J.League 1	9th / 16 clubs
Emperor's Cup	4th round
J.League Cup	Semifinals

== Domestic results ==
=== J.League 1 ===
11 March 2000 1-1	Kashima Antlers	1-0	Nagoya Grampus Eight	Tokyo National Stadium
JST (UTC+09)

18 March 2000 1-2	Nagoya Grampus Eight	0-1	Júbilo Iwata	Mizuho Athletic Stadium
JST (UTC+09)

25 March 2000 1-3	FC Tokyo	2-1 (GG) (a.e.t.)	Nagoya Grampus Eight	Tokyo National Stadium
JST (UTC+09)

1 April 2000 1-4	Nagoya Grampus Eight	1-2 (GG) (a.e.t.)	Avispa Fukuoka	Mizuho Rugby Stadium
JST (UTC+09)

5 April 2000 1-5	Kyoto Purple Sanga	0-1	Nagoya Grampus Eight	Nishikyogoku Athletic Stadium
JST (UTC+09)

8 April 2000 1-6	Nagoya Grampus Eight	1-0	Shimizu S-Pulse	Mizuho Athletic Stadium
JST (UTC+09)

15 April 2000 1-7	Yokohama F. Marinos	2-0	Nagoya Grampus Eight	International Stadium Yokohama
JST (UTC+09)

22 April 2000 1-8	Nagoya Grampus Eight	3-1	Cerezo Osaka	Mizuho Athletic Stadium
JST (UTC+09)

29 April 2000 1-9	JEF United Ichihara	0-1 (GG) (a.e.t.)	Nagoya Grampus Eight	Sendai Stadium
JST (UTC+09)

3 May 2000 1-10	Nagoya Grampus Eight	1-2	Vissel Kobe	Mizuho Athletic Stadium
JST (UTC+09)

6 May 2000 1-11	Verdy Kawasaki	2-3 (GG) (a.e.t.)	Nagoya Grampus Eight	Tokyo National Stadium
JST (UTC+09)

13 May 2000 1-12	Kawasaki Frontale	1-1 (GG) (a.e.t.)	Nagoya Grampus Eight	Todoroki Athletics Stadium
JST (UTC+09)

17 May 2000 1-13	Nagoya Grampus Eight	0-2	Kashiwa Reysol	Mizuho Athletic Stadium
JST (UTC+09)

20 May 2000 1-14	Gamba Osaka	1-2 (GG) (a.e.t.)	Nagoya Grampus Eight	Osaka Expo '70 Stadium
JST (UTC+09)

27 May 2000 1-15	Nagoya Grampus Eight	2-1	Sanfrecce Hiroshima	Mizuho Rugby Stadium
JST (UTC+09)

24 June 2000 2-1	Nagoya Grampus Eight	0-3	Kashima Antlers	Mizuho Athletic Stadium
JST (UTC+09)

1 July 2000 2-2	Júbilo Iwata	5-1	Nagoya Grampus Eight	Júbilo Iwata Stadium
JST (UTC+09)

8 July 2000 2-3	Nagoya Grampus Eight	2-2 (GG) (a.e.t.)	Verdy Kawasaki	Mizuho Athletic Stadium
JST (UTC+09)

15 July 2000 2-4	Vissel Kobe	1-3	Nagoya Grampus Eight	Kobe Universiade Memorial Stadium
JST (UTC+09)

22 July 2000 2-5	Nagoya Grampus Eight	2-0	JEF United Ichihara	Mizuho Rugby Stadium
JST (UTC+09)

26 July 2000 2-6	Cerezo Osaka	0-3	Nagoya Grampus Eight	Osaka Nagai Stadium
JST (UTC+09)

29 July 2000 2-7	Nagoya Grampus Eight	3-2	Yokohama F. Marinos	Mizuho Athletic Stadium
JST (UTC+09)

5 August 2000 2-8	Avispa Fukuoka	3-2 (GG) (a.e.t.)	Nagoya Grampus Eight	Hakatanomori Football Stadium
JST (UTC+09)

12 August 2000 2-9	Nagoya Grampus Eight	4-1	FC Tokyo	Mizuho Athletic Stadium
JST (UTC+09)

19 August 2000 2-10	Shimizu S-Pulse	1-2	Nagoya Grampus Eight	Nihondaira Sports Stadium
JST (UTC+09)

8 November 2000 2-11	Nagoya Grampus Eight	0-1	Kyoto Purple Sanga	Mizuho Athletic Stadium
JST (UTC+09)

11 November 2000 2-12	Sanfrecce Hiroshima	4-0	Nagoya Grampus Eight	Hiroshima Big Arch
JST (UTC+09)

18 November 2000 2-13	Nagoya Grampus Eight	1-2 (GG) (a.e.t.)	Gamba Osaka	Mizuho Athletic Stadium
JST (UTC+09)

23 November 2000 2-14	Kashiwa Reysol	2-1	Nagoya Grampus Eight	Hitachi Kashiwa Soccer Stadium
JST (UTC+09)

26 November 2000 2-15	Nagoya Grampus Eight	1-0	Kawasaki Frontale	Mizuho Athletic Stadium
JST (UTC+09)

=== Emperor's Cup ===
1st Round	bye

2nd Round	bye

10 December 2000 3rd Round	Nagoya Grampus Eight	3-2	Shonan Bellmare	Mizuho Athletic Stadium
JST (UTC+09)

17 December 2000 4th Round	Júbilo Iwata	2-0	Nagoya Grampus Eight	Mizuho Athletic Stadium
JST (UTC+09)

=== J.League Cup ===
1st Round	bye

5 July 2000 2nd Round-1	JEF United Ichihara	1-1	Nagoya Grampus Eight	Ichihara Seaside Stadium
JST (UTC+09)

12 July 2000 2nd Round-2	Nagoya Grampus Eight	2-1 (3-2 agg.)	JEF United Ichihara	Mizuho Athletic Stadium
JST (UTC+09)

30 August 2000 Quarterfinals-1	Shimizu S-Pulse	4-6	Nagoya Grampus Eight	Kusanagi Athletic Stadium
JST (UTC+09)

6 September 2000 Quarterfinals-2	Nagoya Grampus Eight	0-0 (6-4 agg.)	Shimizu S-Pulse	Mizuho Athletic Stadium
JST (UTC+09)

11 October 2000 Semifinals-1	Nagoya Grampus Eight	1-3	Kashima Antlers	Mizuho Rugby Stadium
JST (UTC+09)

18 October 2000 Semifinals-2	Kashima Antlers	3-2 (6-3 agg.)	Nagoya Grampus Eight	Sendai Stadium
JST (UTC+09)

== Player statistics ==
No.	Pos.	Nat.	Player	D.o.B. (Age)	Height / Weight	J.League 1		Emperor's Cup		J.League Cup		Total	
No.	Pos.	Nat.	Player	D.o.B. (Age)	Height / Weight	Apps	Goals	Apps	Goals	Apps	Goals	Apps	Goals
1	GK	(Japan)	Seigo Narazaki	April 15, 1976 (aged 23)	cm / kg	30	0						
2	DF	(Japan)	Seiichi Ogawa	July 21, 1970 (aged 29)	cm / kg	17	0						
3	DF	(Brazil)	Romild	October 25, 1973 (aged 26)	cm / kg	10	0						
4	DF	(Japan)	Kazuhisa Iijima	January 6, 1970 (aged 30)	cm / kg	5	0						
5	DF	(Japan)	Go Oiwa	June 23, 1972 (aged 27)	cm / kg	17	0						
6	MF	(Japan)	Motohiro Yamaguchi	January 29, 1969 (aged 31)	cm / kg	28	1						
7	MF	(Netherlands)	Tarik Oulida	January 19, 1974 (aged 26)	cm / kg	16	1						
8	FW	(Brazil)	Ueslei	April 19, 1972 (aged 27)	cm / kg	9	7						
9	MF	(Japan)	Shigeyoshi Mochizuki	July 9, 1973 (aged 26)	cm / kg	13	0						
10	FW	(Serbia and Montenegro)	Dragan Stojković	March 3, 1965 (aged 35)	cm / kg	26	5						
11	MF	(Japan)	Takashi Hirano	July 15, 1974 (aged 25)	cm / kg	9	0						
13	MF	(Japan)	Kunihiko Takizawa	April 20, 1978 (aged 21)	cm / kg	16	1						
14	DF	(Japan)	Masahiro Koga	September 8, 1978 (aged 21)	cm / kg	25	2						
15	DF	(Japan)	Masayuki Omori	November 9, 1976 (aged 23)	cm / kg	29	0						
16	GK	(Japan)	Seiji Honda	February 25, 1976 (aged 24)	cm / kg	0	0						
17	MF	(Japan)	Yuji Miyahara	July 19, 1980 (aged 19)	cm / kg	2	0						
18	FW	(Japan)	Kenji Fukuda	October 21, 1977 (aged 22)	cm / kg	26	4						
20	FW	(Japan)	Ryuta Hara	April 19, 1981 (aged 18)	cm / kg	12	2						
21	MF	(Japan)	Tetsuya Okayama	August 27, 1973 (aged 26)	cm / kg	28	6						
22	GK	(Japan)	Yasuhiro Tominaga	May 22, 1980 (aged 19)	cm / kg	0	0						
23	MF	(Japan)	Hiroki Mihara	April 20, 1978 (aged 21)	cm / kg	0	0						
24	DF	(Japan)	Hideaki Tominaga	August 27, 1976 (aged 23)	cm / kg	1	0						
25	FW	(Japan)	Ryoji Ujihara	May 10, 1981 (aged 18)	cm / kg	0	0						
26	DF	(Japan)	Kohei Yamamichi	May 11, 1980 (aged 19)	cm / kg	0	0						
27	MF	(Japan)	Masahiro Iwata	September 23, 1981 (aged 18)	cm / kg	7	0						
28	MF	(Japan)	Kenji Hada	June 27, 1981 (aged 18)	cm / kg	0	0						
29	MF	(Japan)	Jiro Yabe	May 26, 1978 (aged 21)	cm / kg	0	0						
30	FW	(Japan)	Wagner Lopes	January 29, 1969 (aged 31)	cm / kg	28	10						
31	DF	(Japan)	Ko Ishikawa	March 10, 1970 (aged 30)	cm / kg	27	1						
32	GK	(Japan)	Yoshitaka Kishikawa	January 16, 1979 (aged 21)	cm / kg	0	0						
33	DF	(Japan)	Taisei Fujita	January 31, 1982 (aged 18)	cm / kg	10	1						
34	GK	(Japan)	Masahiko Nakagawa	August 26, 1969 (aged 30)	cm / kg	0	0						
35	DF	(Japan)	Yasunari Hiraoka	March 13, 1972 (aged 27)	cm / kg	12	1						
36	DF	(Japan)	Naoki Hiraoka	May 24, 1973 (aged 26)	cm / kg	2	0						
