= Kunihiko Takizawa =

Japanese footballer

Kunihiko Takizawa 滝澤 邦彦
Personal information
- Full name: Kunihiko Takizawa
- Date of birth: April 20, 1978 (age 48)
- Place of birth: Fuchu, Tokyo, Japan
- Height: 1.77 m (5 ft 9 1/2 in)
- Position: Midfielder

Youth career
- 1994–1996: Bunan High School

Senior career*
Years	Team	Apps	(Gls)
1997–2004	Nagoya Grampus Eight	107	(2)
2004	Vissel Kobe	2	(0)
2005	JEF United Chiba	5	(0)
2006–2008	Yokohama FC	91	(2)
2009	Tokyo Verdy	35	(2)
2010–2011	Bangkok Glass		
2012	RSU		
2013	Ayutthaya		
2014	RSU		
Total		240	(6)
Medal record
Nagoya Grampus Eight
Winner	Emperor's Cup	1999
JEF United Chiba
Winner	J.League Cup	2005
- * Club domestic league appearances and goals

Kunihiko Takizawa (滝澤 邦彦, Takizawa Kunihiko; born April 20, 1978) is a former Japanese football player.

== Playing career ==
Takizawa was born in Fuchu on April 20, 1978. After graduating from high school, he joined J1 League club Nagoya Grampus Eight in 1997. However he could hardly play in the match until 1999. He played many matches as left midfielder from 2000 and became a regular player in 2003. However his opportunity to play decreased in 2004 and he moved to Vissel Kobe in August. In 2005, he moved to JEF United Chiba. However he could hardly play in the match and left the club end of 2005 season. In June 2006, he joined J2 League club Yokohama FC. He played many matches and the club won the champions in 2006 and was promoted to J1. In 2007, although he played as regular player, the club finished at bottom place and was relegated to J2 in a year. In 2009, he moved to Tokyo Verdy. Although he played as regular player, his opportunity to play decreased in late season. In 2010, he moved to Thailand and played for Bangkok Glass, RSU and Ayutthaya. He retired end of 2014 season.

== Club statistics ==
Club performance			League		Cup		League Cup		Total	
Season	Club	League	Apps	Goals	Apps	Goals	Apps	Goals	Apps	Goals
Japan			League		Emperor's Cup		J.League Cup		Total	
1997	Nagoya Grampus Eight	J1 League	9	0	0	0	2	0	11	0
1998	Nagoya Grampus Eight	J1 League	1	0	0	0	3	1	4	1
1999	Nagoya Grampus Eight	J1 League	0	0	0	0	0	0	0	0
2000	Nagoya Grampus Eight	J1 League	16	1	2	0	5	2	23	3
2001	Nagoya Grampus Eight	J1 League	16	0	1	0	2	0	19	0
2002	Nagoya Grampus Eight	J1 League	29	0	3	0	6	2	38	2
2003	Nagoya Grampus Eight	J1 League	28	1	2	0	6	0	36	1
2004	Nagoya Grampus Eight	J1 League	8	0	0	0	2	0	10	0
2004	Vissel Kobe	J1 League	2	0	0	0	0	0	2	0
2005	JEF United Chiba	J1 League	5	0	0	0	3	0	8	0
2006	Yokohama FC	J2 League	21	2	1	0	-		22	2
2007	Yokohama FC	J1 League	31	0	2	2	6	0	39	2
2008	Yokohama FC	J2 League	39	0	2	0	-		41	0
2009	Tokyo Verdy	J2 League	35	2	0	0	-		35	2
Total			240	6	13	2	35	5	288	13
