= Romildo =

Romildo is a given name. Notable people with the name include:

- Romildo Etcheverry (1906–1967), Paraguayan footballer
- Romildo Ribeiro Soares (born 1947), Brazilian televangelist and missionary
- Romildo (footballer, born 1973), Romildo Santos Rosa, Brazilian football defender
- Romildo (footballer, born 2000), Romildo Del Piage de Souza, Brazilian football midfielder
- Romildo (footballer, born 1984), Romildo Dos Santos Pinheiro, Brazilian football defender

== Other uses ==
- Romildo, a Thoroughbred racehorse, winner of the 1984 Prix Ganay
