= 1998 Nagoya Grampus Eight season =

Nagoya Grampus Eight
1998 season
- Manager: Koji Tanaka
- Stadium: Mizuho Athletic Stadium
- J.League: 5th
- Emperor's Cup: Semifinals
- J.League Cup: GL-D 2nd
- Top goalscorer: Kenji Fukuda (16)
Home colours	Away colours

1998 Nagoya Grampus Eight season

== Competitions ==
Competitions	Position
J.League	5th / 18 clubs
Emperor's Cup	Semifinals
J.League Cup	GL-D 2nd / 5 clubs

== Domestic results ==
=== J.League ===
21 March 1998 1-1	Nagoya Grampus Eight	2-3	Vissel Kobe	Mizuho Athletic Stadium
JST (UTC+09)

25 March 1998 1-2	JEF United Ichihara	1-2	Nagoya Grampus Eight	Ichihara Seaside Stadium
JST (UTC+09)

28 March 1998 1-3	Nagoya Grampus Eight	2-1	Yokohama Flügels	Mizuho Athletic Stadium
JST (UTC+09)

4 April 1998 1-4	Cerezo Osaka	2-0	Nagoya Grampus Eight	Osaka Nagai Stadium
JST (UTC+09)

11 April 1998 1-5	Nagoya Grampus Eight	3-2 (GG) (a.e.t.)	Sanfrecce Hiroshima	Mizuho Athletic Stadium
JST (UTC+09)

15 April 1998 1-6	Avispa Fukuoka	1-2	Nagoya Grampus Eight	Hakatanomori Football Stadium
JST (UTC+09)

18 April 1998 1-7	Nagoya Grampus Eight	2-1 (GG) (a.e.t.)	Consadole Sapporo	Mizuho Athletic Stadium
JST (UTC+09)

25 April 1998 1-8	Shimizu S-Pulse	3-1	Nagoya Grampus Eight	Nihondaira Sports Stadium
JST (UTC+09)

29 April 1998 1-9	Nagoya Grampus Eight	3-0	Kashima Antlers	Mizuho Athletic Stadium
JST (UTC+09)

2 May 1998 1-10	Kashiwa Reysol	2-3 (GG) (a.e.t.)	Nagoya Grampus Eight	Hitachi Kashiwa Soccer Stadium
JST (UTC+09)

5 May 1998 1-11	Nagoya Grampus Eight	0-0 (GG) (a.e.t.) (1-3 p)	Gamba Osaka	Gifu Nagaragawa Stadium
JST (UTC+09)

9 May 1998 1-12	Yokohama Marinos	1-3	Nagoya Grampus Eight	International Stadium Yokohama
JST (UTC+09)

25 July 1998 1-13	Nagoya Grampus Eight	3-1	Urawa Red Diamonds	Mizuho Athletic Stadium
JST (UTC+09)

29 July 1998 1-14	Nagoya Grampus Eight	3-1	Kyoto Purple Sanga	Mizuho Athletic Stadium
JST (UTC+09)

1 August 1998 1-15	Bellmare Hiratsuka	0-5	Nagoya Grampus Eight	Hiratsuka Athletics Stadium
JST (UTC+09)

5 August 1998 1-16	Nagoya Grampus Eight	1-2	Júbilo Iwata	Mizuho Athletic Stadium
JST (UTC+09)

8 August 1998 1-17	Verdy Kawasaki	0-2	Nagoya Grampus Eight	Todoroki Athletics Stadium
JST (UTC+09)

22 August 1998 2-1	Kyoto Purple Sanga	2-3	Nagoya Grampus Eight	Nishikyogoku Athletic Stadium
JST (UTC+09)

29 August 1998 2-2	Nagoya Grampus Eight	2-0	Bellmare Hiratsuka	Mizuho Athletic Stadium
JST (UTC+09)

5 September 1998 2-3	Júbilo Iwata	4-2	Nagoya Grampus Eight	Júbilo Iwata Stadium
JST (UTC+09)

12 September 1998 2-4	Nagoya Grampus Eight	1-0	Verdy Kawasaki	Gifu Nagaragawa Stadium
JST (UTC+09)

15 September 1998 2-5	Vissel Kobe	1-3	Nagoya Grampus Eight	Kobe Universiade Memorial Stadium
JST (UTC+09)

19 September 1998 2-6	Nagoya Grampus Eight	3-0	JEF United Ichihara	Mizuho Athletic Stadium
JST (UTC+09)

23 September 1998 2-7	Yokohama Flügels	2-3	Nagoya Grampus Eight	International Stadium Yokohama
JST (UTC+09)

26 September 1998 2-8	Nagoya Grampus Eight	1-1 (GG) (a.e.t.) (5-3 p)	Cerezo Osaka	Mizuho Athletic Stadium
JST (UTC+09)

3 October 1998 2-9	Sanfrecce Hiroshima	2-1 (GG) (a.e.t.)	Nagoya Grampus Eight	Hiroshima Big Arch
JST (UTC+09)

14 October 1998 2-10	Nagoya Grampus Eight	2-0	Avispa Fukuoka	Mizuho Athletic Stadium
JST (UTC+09)

17 October 1998 2-11	Consadole Sapporo	3-2	Nagoya Grampus Eight	Sapporo Atsubetsu Park Stadium
JST (UTC+09)

21 October 1998 2-12	Nagoya Grampus Eight	0-2	Shimizu S-Pulse	Mizuho Athletic Stadium
JST (UTC+09)

24 October 1998 2-13	Kashima Antlers	1-0	Nagoya Grampus Eight	Kashima Soccer Stadium
JST (UTC+09)

31 October 1998 2-14	Nagoya Grampus Eight	4-2	Kashiwa Reysol	Gifu Nagaragawa Stadium
JST (UTC+09)

3 November 1998 2-15	Gamba Osaka	2-3	Nagoya Grampus Eight	Osaka Expo '70 Stadium
JST (UTC+09)

7 November 1998 2-16	Nagoya Grampus Eight	3-2 (GG) (a.e.t.)	Yokohama Marinos	Mizuho Athletic Stadium
JST (UTC+09)

14 November 1998 2-17	Urawa Red Diamonds	2-1	Nagoya Grampus Eight	Urawa Komaba Stadium
JST (UTC+09)

=== Emperor's Cup ===
1st Round	bye

2nd Round	bye

13 December 1998 3rd Round	Nagoya Grampus Eight	3-1	Kwansei Gakuin University	Gifu Nagaragawa Stadium
JST (UTC+09)

20 December 1998 4th Round	Nagoya Grampus Eight	3-2	Montedio Yamagata	Tochigi Green Stadium
JST (UTC+09)

23 December 1998 Quarterfinals	Nagoya Grampus Eight	2-1 (GG) (a.e.t.)	Verdy Kawasaki	Kagoshima Kamoike Stadium
JST (UTC+09)

27 December 1998 Semifinals	Nagoya Grampus Eight	1-2 (GG) (a.e.t.)	Shimizu S-Pulse	International Stadium Yokohama
JST (UTC+09)

=== J.League Cup ===
16 May 1998 GL-D-1	Nagoya Grampus Eight	1-1	Vissel Kobe	Mizuho Athletic Stadium
JST (UTC+09)

GL-D-2	bye

30 May 1998 GL-D-3	Bellmare Hiratsuka	1-3	Nagoya Grampus Eight	Hiratsuka Athletics Stadium
JST (UTC+09)

3 June 1998 GL-D-4	Kyoto Purple Sanga	1-2	Nagoya Grampus Eight	Nishikyogoku Athletic Stadium
JST (UTC+09)

6 June 1998 GL-D-5	Nagoya Grampus Eight	1-4	JEF United Ichihara	Mizuho Athletic Stadium
JST (UTC+09)

== Player statistics ==
No.	Pos.	Nat.	Player	D.o.B. (Age)	Height / Weight	J.League		Emperor's Cup		J.League Cup		Total	
No.	Pos.	Nat.	Player	D.o.B. (Age)	Height / Weight	Apps	Goals	Apps	Goals	Apps	Goals	Apps	Goals
1	GK	(Japan)	Yuji Ito	May 20, 1965 (aged 32)	cm / kg	29	0						
2	DF	(Japan)	Seiichi Ogawa	July 21, 1970 (aged 27)	cm / kg	0	0						
3	DF	(Japan)	Go Oiwa	June 23, 1972 (aged 25)	cm / kg	32	2						
4	DF	(Japan)	Kazuhisa Iijima	January 6, 1970 (aged 28)	cm / kg	12	0						
5	DF	(Brazil)	Alexandre Torres	August 22, 1966 (aged 31)	cm / kg	24	0						
6	MF	(Ivory Coast)	Bernard Allou	June 19, 1975 (aged 22)	cm / kg	10	4						
7	MF	(Brazil)	Valdo Filho	January 12, 1964 (aged 34)	cm / kg	10	2						
7	MF	(Netherlands)	Tarik Oulida	January 19, 1974 (aged 24)	cm / kg	16	4						
8	MF	(Japan)	Tetsuya Asano	February 23, 1967 (aged 31)	cm / kg	23	2						
9	MF	(Japan)	Shigeyoshi Mochizuki	July 9, 1973 (aged 24)	cm / kg	34	2						
10	FW	(Serbia and Montenegro)	Dragan Stojković	March 3, 1965 (aged 33)	cm / kg	28	7						
11	MF	(Japan)	Takashi Hirano	July 15, 1974 (aged 23)	cm / kg	30	8						
12	MF	(Japan)	Tetsuhiro Kina	December 10, 1976 (aged 21)	cm / kg	0	0						
13	FW	(Japan)	Koji Noguchi	June 5, 1970 (aged 27)	cm / kg	13	6						
14	DF	(Japan)	Masahiro Koga	September 8, 1978 (aged 19)	cm / kg	21	0						
15	DF	(Japan)	Masaharu Suzuki	August 3, 1970 (aged 27)	cm / kg	1	0						
16	GK	(Japan)	Kazumasa Kawano	November 7, 1970 (aged 27)	cm / kg	6	0						
17	FW	(Japan)	Kenji Ito	June 29, 1976 (aged 21)	cm / kg	0	0						
18	FW	(Japan)	Kenji Fukuda	October 21, 1977 (aged 20)	cm / kg	33	16						
19	FW	(Japan)	Takafumi Ogura	July 6, 1973 (aged 24)	cm / kg	13	1						
20	MF	(Japan)	Suguru Ito	September 7, 1975 (aged 22)	cm / kg	7	1						
21	MF	(Japan)	Tetsuya Okayama	August 27, 1973 (aged 24)	cm / kg	30	14						
22	GK	(Japan)	Hiroki Mizuhara	January 15, 1975 (aged 23)	cm / kg	0	0						
23	GK	(Japan)	Seiji Honda	February 25, 1976 (aged 22)	cm / kg	0	0						
24	MF	(Japan)	Hiroki Mihara	April 20, 1978 (aged 19)	cm / kg	0	0						
25	DF	(Japan)	Masayuki Omori	November 9, 1976 (aged 21)	cm / kg	7	0						
26	FW	(Japan)	Kotaro Yamazaki	October 19, 1978 (aged 19)	cm / kg	0	0						
27	DF	(Japan)	Yusuke Nakatani	September 22, 1978 (aged 19)	cm / kg	26	0						
28	MF	(Japan)	Kunihiko Takizawa	April 20, 1978 (aged 19)	cm / kg	1	0						
29	MF	(Japan)	Jiro Yabe	May 26, 1978 (aged 19)	cm / kg	0	0						
30	MF	(Japan)	Yukio Shimbara	June 5, 1979 (aged 18)	cm / kg	0	0						
31	DF	(Japan)	Ko Ishikawa	March 10, 1970 (aged 28)	cm / kg	33	0						

== Other pages ==
- (in Japanese) J.League official site
- (in Japanese) Nagoya Grampus official site: J1 League Part 1
- (in Japanese) Nagoya Grampus official site: J1 League Part 2
- (in Japanese) Nagoya Grampus official site: Emperor's Cup
