= Kenji Fukuda =

Japanese footballer

Kenji Fukuda 福田 健二
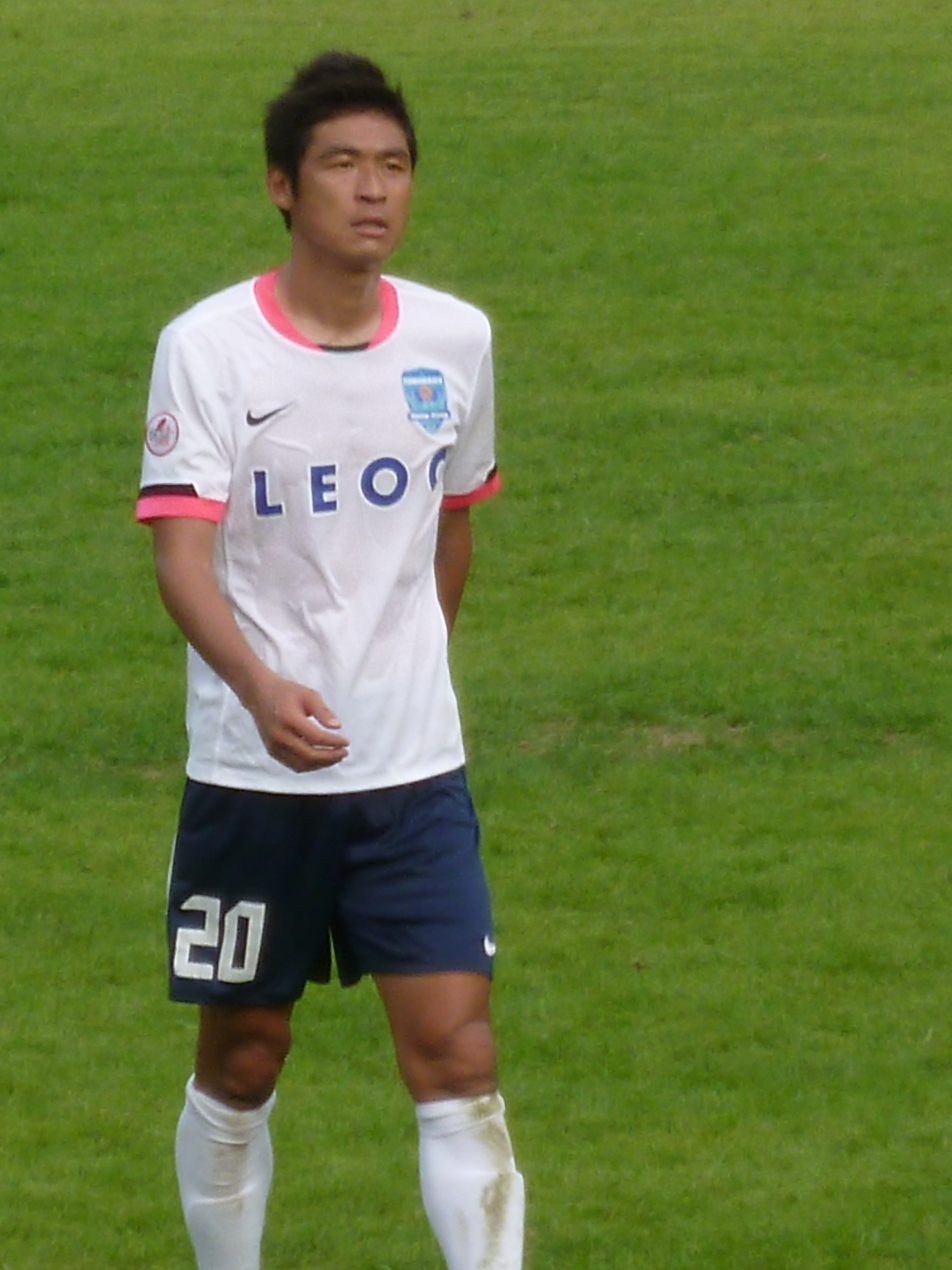

Personal information
- Full name: Kenji Fukuda
- Date of birth: October 21, 1977 (age 49)
- Place of birth: Niihama, Ehime, Japan
- Height: 1.78 m (5 ft 10 in)
- Position: Forward

Youth career
- 1993–1995: Narashino High School

Senior career*
Years	Team	Apps	(Gls)
1996–2001	Nagoya Grampus Eight	114	(37)
2001–2003	FC Tokyo	32	(3)
2003	Vegalta Sendai	10	(0)
2004	Guaraní	36	(10)
2005	Pachuca Juniors	21	(12)
2005	Irapuato	19	(10)
2006	Castellón	17	(2)
2006–2007	Numancia	39	(10)
2007–2008	Las Palmas	15	(3)
2008–2009	Ionikos	24	(9)
2010–2012	Ehime FC	65	(8)
2013–2016	Metro Gallery	58	(30)
Total		450	(134)

International career
1997	Japan U-20	4	(1)
Medal record
Nagoya Grampus Eight
Runner-up	J1 League	1996
Winner	Emperor's Cup	1999
- * Club domestic league appearances and goals

Kenji Fukuda (福田 健二, Fukuda Kenji; born October 21, 1977) is a former Japanese football player. He is a left-footed forward.

== Club career ==
After graduating from Narashino High School in Chiba in 1996, he joined J1 League side Nagoya Grampus Eight. He played many matches from 1997 and became a regular player in 1998. He helped the club to win the Sanwa Bank Cup in 1997, 1999 Emperor's Cup and the 2nd place 1996–97 Asian Cup Winners' Cup. However his opportunity to play decreased from 2000. He moved to FC Tokyo in August 2001 and Vegalta Sendai in August 2003.

He moved to Guaraní in Paraguay in 2004 and debuted in February against Cerro Porteño. He set up the goal for his side in their 3-1 defeat. Starting in 2005, he played for many clubs, including Pachuca Juniors and Irapuato in Mexico, as well as Castellón, Numancia, and Las Palmas in Spain. In August 2008 he moved to Greece and Ionikos FC.

In September 2009, he returned to Japan and signed with his local club Ehime FC. He played for the club from 2010 season because it was past the deadline of the player's registration for 2009 season. He played many matches as captain in 2010. However his opportunity to play decreased and he left the club at the end of the 2012 season.

In 2013, he moved to Hong Kong and signed with Yokohama FC Hong Kong (later Metro Gallery). He played for the club until June 2016 and retired.

== National team career ==
He represented Japan at several underage levels. He was a member of the Japan U-20 national team for the 1997 World Youth Championship hosted by Malaysia. He scored a goal against Costa Rica at the group stage. The team was eliminated at the quarter-final.

== Club statistics ==
Club performance			League		Cup		League Cup		Total	
Season	Club	League	Apps	Goals	Apps	Goals	Apps	Goals	Apps	Goals
Japan			League		Emperor's Cup		J.League Cup		Total	
1996	Nagoya Grampus Eight	J1 League	4	0	1	0	2	0	7	0
1997	Nagoya Grampus Eight	J1 League	19	5	1	0	8	1	28	6
1998	Nagoya Grampus Eight	J1 League	33	16	3	2	4	0	40	18
1999	Nagoya Grampus Eight	J1 League	24	10	4	2	3	1	31	13
2000	Nagoya Grampus Eight	J1 League	26	4	2	0	6	0	34	4
2001	Nagoya Grampus Eight	J1 League	8	2	0	0	3	0	11	2
2001	FC Tokyo	J1 League	11	1	1	0	0	0	12	1
2002	FC Tokyo	J1 League	21	2	0	0	7	3	28	5
2003	FC Tokyo	J1 League	0	0	0	0	0	0	0	0
2003	Vegalta Sendai	J1 League	10	0	1	0	0	0	11	0
Paraguay			League		Cup		League Cup		Total	
2004	Guaraní	Primera División	36	10					36	10
Mexico			League		Cup		League Cup		Total	
2004/05	Pachuca Juniors	Segunda División	21	12					21	12
2005/06	Irapuato	Primera División A	19	10					19	10
Spain			League		Copa del Rey		Copa de la Liga		Total	
2005/06	Castellón	Segunda División	17	2	0	0	-		17	2
2006/07	Numancia	Segunda División	39	10	1	0	-		40	10
2007/08	Las Palmas	Segunda División	15	3	2	0	-		17	3
Greece			League		Greek Cup		League Cup		Total	
2008/09	Ionikos	Beta Ethniki	24	9					24	9
Japan			League		Emperor's Cup		J.League Cup		Total	
2010	Ehime FC	J2 League	29	7	1	0	-		30	7
2011	Ehime FC	J2 League	22	1	1	1	-		23	2
2012	Ehime FC	J2 League	14	0	0	0	-		14	0
Hong Kong			League		Cup		AFC Cup		Total	
2012/13	Yokohama FC Hong Kong	First Division League	8	3	2	0	-		10	3
2013/14	Yokohama FC Hong Kong	First Division League	18	11	2	2	-		20	13
2014/15	YFCMD	Premier League	16	10	7	2	-		23	12
2015/16	Metro Gallery	Premier League	16	6	6	1	-		22	7
Country	Japan		221	48	15	5	33	5	269	58
Country	Paraguay		36	10					36	10
Country	Mexico		40	22					40	22
Country	Spain		71	15	3	0	-		74	15
Country	Greece		24	9					24	9
Country	Hong Kong		58	30	17	5	-		75	35
Total			450	134	35	10	33	5	518	149
