= 1997 Nagoya Grampus Eight season =

Nagoya Grampus Eight
1997 season
- Manager: Queiroz; Koji Tanaka
- Stadium: Mizuho Athletic Stadium
- J.League: 9th
- Emperor's Cup: 3rd Round
- J.League Cup: Semifinals
- Top goalscorer: Yasuyuki Moriyama (9)
Home colours	Away colours

1997 Nagoya Grampus Eight season

== Competitions ==
Competitions	Position
J.League	9th / 17 clubs
Emperor's Cup	3rd round
J.League Cup	Semifinals

== Domestic results ==
=== J.League ===
12 April 1997 1-1	Nagoya Grampus Eight	2-3	Cerezo Osaka	Mizuho Athletic Stadium
JST (UTC+09)

16 April 1997 1-2	Vissel Kobe	2-1 (GG) (a.e.t.)	Nagoya Grampus Eight	Kobe Universiade Memorial Stadium
JST (UTC+09)

19 April 1997 1-3	Nagoya Grampus Eight	0-2	Kashima Antlers	Mizuho Athletic Stadium
JST (UTC+09)

1-4	bye

26 April 1997 1-5	Yokohama Flügels	2-0	Nagoya Grampus Eight	Yokohama Mitsuzawa Stadium
JST (UTC+09)

3 May 1997 1-6	Nagoya Grampus Eight	0-2	Júbilo Iwata	Gifu Nagaragawa Stadium
JST (UTC+09)

7 May 1997 1-7	Kashiwa Reysol	1-0	Nagoya Grampus Eight	Hitachi Kashiwa Soccer Stadium
JST (UTC+09)

10 May 1997 1-8	Nagoya Grampus Eight	3-1	Urawa Red Diamonds	Mizuho Athletic Stadium
JST (UTC+09)

17 May 1997 1-9	Gamba Osaka	0-1	Nagoya Grampus Eight	Osaka Expo '70 Stadium
JST (UTC+09)

24 May 1997 1-10	Nagoya Grampus Eight	1-0	Verdy Kawasaki	Gifu Nagaragawa Stadium
JST (UTC+09)

28 May 1997 1-11	Kyoto Purple Sanga	1-3	Nagoya Grampus Eight	Nishikyogoku Athletic Stadium
JST (UTC+09)

31 May 1997 1-12	Nagoya Grampus Eight	3-2	JEF United Ichihara	Mizuho Athletic Stadium
JST (UTC+09)

5 July 1997 1-13	Bellmare Hiratsuka	1-0	Nagoya Grampus Eight	Hiratsuka Athletics Stadium
JST (UTC+09)

9 July 1997 1-14	Nagoya Grampus Eight	0-1	Yokohama Marinos	Mizuho Athletic Stadium
JST (UTC+09)

12 July 1997 1-15	Shimizu S-Pulse	3-1	Nagoya Grampus Eight	Nihondaira Sports Stadium
JST (UTC+09)

16 July 1997 1-16	Nagoya Grampus Eight	1-0	Sanfrecce Hiroshima	Mizuho Athletic Stadium
JST (UTC+09)

19 July 1997 1-17	Avispa Fukuoka	3-2	Nagoya Grampus Eight	Hakatanomori Football Stadium
JST (UTC+09)

30 July 1997 2-1	Sanfrecce Hiroshima	1-0	Nagoya Grampus Eight	Hiroshima Big Arch
JST (UTC+09)

2 August 1997 2-2	Cerezo Osaka	2-3	Nagoya Grampus Eight	Osaka Nagai Stadium
JST (UTC+09)

6 August 1997 2-3	Nagoya Grampus Eight	3-0	Vissel Kobe	Mizuho Athletic Stadium
JST (UTC+09)

9 August 1997 2-4	Kashima Antlers	7-0	Nagoya Grampus Eight	Kashima Soccer Stadium
JST (UTC+09)

2-5	bye

20 August 1997 2-6	Nagoya Grampus Eight	2-1	Yokohama Flügels	Mizuho Athletic Stadium
JST (UTC+09)

23 August 1997 2-7	Júbilo Iwata	1-3	Nagoya Grampus Eight	Júbilo Iwata Stadium
JST (UTC+09)

30 August 1997 2-8	Nagoya Grampus Eight	1-0	Kashiwa Reysol	Mizuho Athletic Stadium
JST (UTC+09)

3 September 1997 2-9	Urawa Red Diamonds	3-0	Nagoya Grampus Eight	Urawa Komaba Stadium
JST (UTC+09)

6 September 1997 2-10	Nagoya Grampus Eight	0-1	Gamba Osaka	Mizuho Athletic Stadium
JST (UTC+09)

10 September 1997 2-11	Nagoya Grampus Eight	2-1	Shimizu S-Pulse	Mizuho Athletic Stadium
JST (UTC+09)

13 September 1997 2-12	Verdy Kawasaki	2-0	Nagoya Grampus Eight	Sapporo Atsubetsu Park Stadium
JST (UTC+09)

20 September 1997 2-13	JEF United Ichihara	1-2	Nagoya Grampus Eight	Tokyo National Stadium
JST (UTC+09)

24 September 1997 2-14	Nagoya Grampus Eight	1-2	Kyoto Purple Sanga	Gifu Nagaragawa Stadium
JST (UTC+09)

27 September 1997 2-15	Nagoya Grampus Eight	2-1	Bellmare Hiratsuka	Gifu Nagaragawa Stadium
JST (UTC+09)

1 October 1997 2-16	Yokohama Marinos	1-2	Nagoya Grampus Eight	Yokohama Mitsuzawa Stadium
JST (UTC+09)

4 October 1997 2-17	Nagoya Grampus Eight	2-0	Avispa Fukuoka	Mizuho Athletic Stadium
JST (UTC+09)

=== Emperor's Cup ===
1st Round	bye

2nd Round	bye

14 December 1997 3rd Round	Nagoya Grampus Eight	1-3	Tokyo Gas	Mizuho Athletic Stadium
JST (UTC+09)

=== J.League Cup ===
8 March 1997 GL-D-1	Nagoya Grampus Eight	2-1	Sanfrecce Hiroshima	Gifu Nagaragawa Stadium
JST (UTC+09)

15 March 1997 GL-D-2	Vissel Kobe	1-1	Nagoya Grampus Eight	Kobe Universiade Memorial Stadium
JST (UTC+09)

19 March 1997 GL-D-3	Nagoya Grampus Eight	1-1	Kashiwa Reysol	Mizuho Athletic Stadium
JST (UTC+09)

22 March 1997 GL-D-4	Nagoya Grampus Eight	3-0	Vissel Kobe	Mizuho Athletic Stadium
JST (UTC+09)

26 March 1997 GL-D-5	Kashiwa Reysol	1-1	Nagoya Grampus Eight	Hitachi Kashiwa Soccer Stadium
JST (UTC+09)

29 March 1997 GL-D-6	Sanfrecce Hiroshima	4-2	Nagoya Grampus Eight	Hiroshima Big Arch
JST (UTC+09)

15 October 1997 Quarterfinals-1	Nagoya Grampus Eight	4-0	JEF United Ichihara	Gifu Nagaragawa Stadium
JST (UTC+09)

18 October 1997 Quarterfinals-2	JEF United Ichihara	1-1 (1-5 agg.)	Nagoya Grampus Eight	Ichihara Seaside Stadium
JST (UTC+09)

1 November 1997 Semifinals-1	Kashima Antlers	1-0	Nagoya Grampus Eight	Kashima Soccer Stadium
JST (UTC+09)

8 November 1997 Semifinals-2	Nagoya Grampus Eight	0-0 (0-1 agg.)	Kashima Antlers	Mizuho Athletic Stadium
JST (UTC+09)

=== Sanwa Bank Cup ===
2 March 1997	Nagoya Grampus Eight	3-1	(United States) Washington, D.C. United	Tokyo National Stadium
	Torres ?'; Okayama ?'; Stojković ?'		?' (o.g.)	Attendance: 26,842

== Player statistics ==
No.	Pos.	Nat.	Player	D.o.B. (Age)	Height / Weight	J.League		Emperor's Cup		J.League Cup		Sanwa Bank Cup		Total	
No.	Pos.	Nat.	Player	D.o.B. (Age)	Height / Weight	Apps	Goals	Apps	Goals	Apps	Goals	Apps	Goals	Apps	Goals
1	GK	(Japan)	Yuji Ito	May 20, 1965 (aged 31)	182 cm / 75 kg	32	0	1	0	10	0	1	0	44	0
2	DF	(Japan)	Seiichi Ogawa	July 21, 1970 (aged 26)	170 cm / 64 kg	27	1	0	0	7	0	0	0	34	1
3	DF	(Japan)	Go Oiwa	June 23, 1972 (aged 24)	180 cm / 75 kg	32	1	0	0	7	0	1	0	40	1
4	DF	(Japan)	Kazuhisa Iijima	January 6, 1970 (aged 27)	177 cm / 71 kg	30	0	1	0	10	0	1	0	42	0
5	DF	(Brazil)	Torres	August 22, 1966 (aged 30)	187 cm / 82 kg	29	2	1	0	10	1	1	1	41	4
6	DF	(Japan)	Takayuki Nishigaya	May 12, 1973 (aged 23)	180 cm / 70 kg	22	0	1	0	7	0	1	0	31	0
7	MF	(Brazil)	Ricardinho	November 26, 1975 (aged 21)	175 cm / 66 kg	22	3	0	0	8	2	1	0	31	5
8	MF	(Japan)	Tetsuya Asano	February 23, 1967 (aged 30)	184 cm / 77 kg	29	4	1	0	10	0	1	0	41	4
9	MF	(Japan)	Shigeyoshi Mochizuki	July 9, 1973 (aged 23)	175 cm / 70 kg	17	3	1	1	10	3	1	0	29	7
10	FW	(Federal Republic of Yugoslavia)	Stojković	March 3, 1965 (aged 32)	177 cm / 73 kg	18	2	0	0	6	1	1	1	25	4
11	FW	(Japan)	Takafumi Ogura	July 6, 1973 (aged 23)	181 cm / 75 kg	0	0		0	0	0	0	0		0
12	MF	(Japan)	Tetsuhiro Kina	December 10, 1976 (aged 20)	177 cm / 70 kg	26	0	0	0	7	1	1	0	34	1
13	MF	(Japan)	Hiroki Mihara	April 20, 1978 (aged 18)	181 cm / 70 kg	0	0		0	0	0	0	0		0
14	DF	(Japan)	Masahiro Koga	September 8, 1978 (aged 18)	183 cm / 76 kg	8	0	1	0	5	0	0	0	14	0
15	FW	(Japan)	Yasuyuki Moriyama	May 1, 1969 (aged 27)	171 cm / 72 kg	29	9	1	0	5	1	0	0	35	10
16	GK	(Japan)	Kazumasa Kawano	November 7, 1970 (aged 26)	185 cm / 82 kg	0	0	0	0	0	0	0	0	0	0
17	MF	(Japan)	Takashi Hirano	July 15, 1974 (aged 22)	178 cm / 73 kg	21	4	1	0	6	3	1	0	29	7
18	FW	(Japan)	Kenji Fukuda	October 21, 1977 (aged 19)	176 cm / 70 kg	19	5	1	0	8	1	1	0	29	6
19	MF	(Japan)	Yusuke Sato	November 2, 1977 (aged 19)	175 cm / 70 kg	0	0		0	0	0	0	0		0
20	MF	(Japan)	Suguru Ito	September 7, 1975 (aged 21)	177 cm / 72 kg	9	1	1	0	0	0	0	0	10	1
21	FW	(Japan)	Tetsuya Okayama	August 27, 1973 (aged 23)	173 cm / 68 kg	28	3	1	0	10	2	1	1	40	6
22	GK	(Japan)	Hiroki Mizuhara	January 15, 1975 (aged 22)	180 cm / 77 kg	0	0		0	0	0	0	0		0
23	GK	(Japan)	Seiji Honda	February 25, 1976 (aged 21)	182 cm / 75 kg	0	0		0	0	0	0	0		0
24	DF	(Japan)	Yasuaki Kato	April 10, 1976 (aged 20)	180 cm / 69 kg	0	0		0	0	0	0	0		0
25	DF	(Japan)	Mitsuru Mukojima	May 5, 1976 (aged 20)	178 cm / 68 kg	1	0	0	0	1	0	0	0	2	0
26	MF	(Japan)	Kotaro Yamazaki	October 19, 1978 (aged 18)	165 cm / 59 kg	0	0		0	0	0	0	0		0
27	DF	(Japan)	Yusuke Nakatani	September 22, 1978 (aged 18)	177 cm / 63 kg	0	0		0	0	0	0	0		0
28	MF	(Japan)	Kunihiko Takizawa	April 20, 1978 (aged 18)	175 cm / 64 kg	9	0	0	0	2	0	0	0	11	0
29	DF	(Japan)	Masaru Hirayama	June 3, 1972 (aged 24)	185 cm / 71 kg	0	0		0	0	0	0	0		0
30	MF	(Japan)	Jiro Yabe	May 26, 1978 (aged 18)	174 cm / 63 kg	0	0		0	0	0	0	0		0
31	FW	(Japan)	Kenji Ito	June 29, 1976 (aged 20)	174 cm / 63 kg	5	1	0	0	0	0	1	0	6	1
33	DF	(Japan)	Masaharu Suzuki †	August 3, 1970 (aged 26)	168 cm / 63 kg	1	0	0	0	0	0	0	0	1	0
34	MF	(Brazil)	Valdo †	January 12, 1964 (aged 33)	-cm / -kg	16	2	1	0	4	0	0	0	21	2

- † player(s) joined the team after the opening of this season.

== Transfers ==
In:

No.	Pos.	Nation	Player
16	GK	JPN	Kazumasa Kawano (from Sanfrecce Hiroshima)
14	DF	JPN	Masahiro Koga (from Higashi Fukuoka High School)
27	DF	JPN	Yusuke Nakatani (from Nara Ikuei High School)
7	MF	BRA	Ricardinho (from Nacional AC)
13	MF	JPN	Hiroki Mihara (from Saga Shogyo High School)
26	MF	JPN	Kotaro Yamazaki (from Shimizu Higashi High School)
28	MF	JPN	Kunihiko Takizawa (from Bunan Senior High School)
30	MF	JPN	Jiro Yabe (from Nara Ikuei High School)
31	FW	JPN	Kenji Ito (from Cosmo Oil Yokkaichi FC)

Out:

No.	Pos.	Nation	Player
—	GK	JPN	Ken Ishikawa (to Brummel Sendai)
—	DF	JPN	Mitsunori Yamao (to Ventforet Kofu)
—	DF	JPN	Kei Taniguchi (to Brummel Sendai)
—	MF	FRA	Durix
—	MF	JPN	Toshihiro Uchida (to Cerezo Osaka)
—	MF	JPN	Tetsuo Nakanishi (to Fujitsu Kawasaki3)
—	MF	JPN	Tomoya Yamagami (to Seino Transportation)
—	FW	CIV	Olivier

== Transfers during the season ==
=== In ===
- (Japan) Masaharu Suzuki (from Yokohama Marinos)
- (Brazil) Valdo Cândido Filho (from Lisboa e Benfica on July)

=== Out ===
- (Japan) Masaru Hirayama (to Kawasaki Frontale)
- (Japan) Kazumasa Kawano (loan to Yokohama Marinos)

== Awards ==
none

== Other pages ==
- (in Japanese) J. League official site
- (in Japanese) Nagoya Grampus official site
