= Suguru Ito =

Japanese footballer

Suguru Ito 伊藤 卓
Personal information
- Full name: Suguru Ito
- Date of birth: September 7, 1975 (age 51)
- Place of birth: Katagami, Japan
- Height: 1.77 m (5 ft 9 1/2 in)
- Position: Midfielder

Youth career
- 1991–1993: Tokai University Daiichi High School
- 1994–1995: Kokushikan University

Senior career*
Years	Team	Apps	(Gls)
1996–1999	Nagoya Grampus Eight	17	(2)
1999	Kyoto Purple Sanga	0	(0)
2000	Vegalta Sendai	24	(6)
2001	Shonan Bellmare	5	(0)
Total		46	(8)

International career
1995	Japan U-20	3	(0)
Medal record
Nagoya Grampus Eight
Runner-up	J1 League	1996
Winner	Emperor's Cup	1999
- * Club domestic league appearances and goals

Suguru Ito (伊藤 卓, Ito Suguru; born September 7, 1975) is a former Japanese football player.

== Club career ==
Ito was born in Akita Prefecture on September 7, 1975. After dropped out from Kokushikan University, he joined Nagoya Grampus Eight in 1996. However he did not play much. He moved to Kyoto Purple Sanga in July 1999, but was not put into play. He moved to the J2 League club Vegalta Sendai in 2000 and played often. He then moved to Shonan Bellmare in 2001. However he did not play much while there and retired at the end of the 2001 season.

== National team career ==
In April 1995, when Ito was a Kokushikan University student, he was selected for the Japan U-20 national team to play in the 1995 World Youth Championship. He wore the number 10 shirt for Japan and played in three matches.

== Club statistics ==
Club performance			League		Cup		League Cup		Total	
Season	Club	League	Apps	Goals	Apps	Goals	Apps	Goals	Apps	Goals
Japan			League		Emperor's Cup		J.League Cup		Total	
1996	Nagoya Grampus Eight	J1 League	0	0	0	0	0	0	0	0
1997	Nagoya Grampus Eight	J1 League	9	1	1	0	0	0	10	1
1998	Nagoya Grampus Eight	J1 League	7	1	1	0	4	1	12	2
1999	Nagoya Grampus Eight	J1 League	1	0	0	0	0	0	1	0
1999	Kyoto Purple Sanga	J1 League	0	0	0	0	0	0	0	0
2000	Vegalta Sendai	J2 League	24	6	1	0	1	0	26	6
2001	Shonan Bellmare	J2 League	5	0	0	0	2	0	7	0
Total			46	8	3	0	7	1	56	9
