= Tetsuya Okayama =

Japanese footballer

Tetsuya Okayama 岡山 哲也
Personal information
- Full name: Tetsuya Okayama
- Date of birth: August 27, 1973 (age 53)
- Place of birth: Nagoya, Aichi, Japan
- Height: 1.73 m (5 ft 8 in)
- Position: Midfielder

Youth career
- 1989–1991: Chukyo University Chukyo High School

Senior career*
Years	Team	Apps	(Gls)
1992–2004	Nagoya Grampus Eight	278	(54)
2005–2006	Albirex Niigata	28	(0)
2007–2008	Albirex Niigata Singapore		
Total		306	(54)
Medal record
Nagoya Grampus Eight
Runner-up	J1 League	1996
Winner	Emperor's Cup	1995
Winner	Emperor's Cup	1999
- * Club domestic league appearances and goals

Tetsuya Okayama (岡山 哲也, Okayama Tetsuya; born August 27, 1973) is a former Japanese football player.

== Playing career ==
Okayama was born in Nagoya on August 27, 1973. After graduating from high school, he joined his local club Nagoya Grampus Eight in 1992. He became a regular player as a mainly offensive midfielder in the 1995 season and he played many matches for a long time. The club won the champions 1995 and 1999 Emperor's Cup. In Asia, the club also won the 2nd place 1996–97 Asian Cup Winners' Cup. In 2005, he moved to Albirex Niigata. In 2007, he moved to Albirex Niigata Singapore. He retired end of 2008 season.

== Club statistics ==
Club performance			League		Cup		League Cup		Total	
Season	Club	League	Apps	Goals	Apps	Goals	Apps	Goals	Apps	Goals
Japan			League		Emperor's Cup		League Cup		Total	
1992	Nagoya Grampus Eight	J1 League	-		0	0	0	0	0	0
1993	Nagoya Grampus Eight	J1 League	7	1	0	0	3	2	10	3
1994	Nagoya Grampus Eight	J1 League	2	0	2	1	0	0	4	1
1995	Nagoya Grampus Eight	J1 League	40	10	5	2	-		45	12
1996	Nagoya Grampus Eight	J1 League	26	9	1	0	14	2	41	11
1997	Nagoya Grampus Eight	J1 League	28	3	1	0	10	2	39	5
1998	Nagoya Grampus Eight	J1 League	30	14	4	3	4	1	38	18
1999	Nagoya Grampus Eight	J1 League	22	3	3	0	5	1	30	4
2000	Nagoya Grampus Eight	J1 League	28	6	2	0	6	3	36	9
2001	Nagoya Grampus Eight	J1 League	23	2	1	0	4	1	28	3
2002	Nagoya Grampus Eight	J1 League	28	0	3	1	4	0	35	1
2003	Nagoya Grampus Eight	J1 League	23	2	2	0	5	0	30	2
2004	Nagoya Grampus Eight	J1 League	21	4	0	0	4	1	25	5
2005	Albirex Niigata	J1 League	12	0	1	0	5	0	18	0
2006	Albirex Niigata	J1 League	16	0	0	0	6	1	22	1
Singapore			League		Singapore Cup		League Cup		Total	
2007	Albirex Niigata Singapore	S.League								
2008	Albirex Niigata Singapore	S.League	30	9	1	0	0	0	31	9
Total	Japan		306	54	25	7	70	14	401	75
Total	Singapore		30	9	1	0	0	0	31	9
Career total			336	63	26	7	70	14	432	84
