= Takashi Hirano =

Japanese footballer

Takashi Hirano 平野 孝
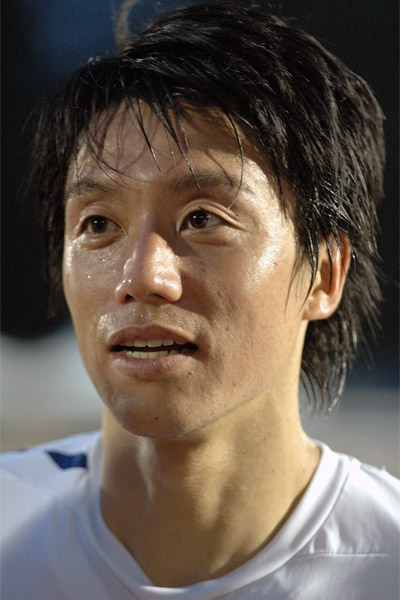

Personal information
- Date of birth: July 15, 1974 (age 52)
- Place of birth: Shizuoka, Shizuoka, Japan
- Height: 1.80 m (5 ft 11 in)
- Position: Midfielder

Youth career
- 1990–1992: Shimizu Shogyo High School

Senior career*
Years	Team	Apps	(Gls)
1993–2000	Nagoya Grampus Eight	222	(43)
2000	Kyoto Purple Sanga	5	(1)
2001	Júbilo Iwata	3	(1)
2002	Vissel Kobe	28	(1)
2003–2005	Tokyo Verdy	80	(8)
2006	Yokohama F. Marinos	9	(0)
2007	Omiya Ardija	3	(1)
2008–2010	Vancouver Whitecaps	65	(1)
Total		415	(56)

International career
1997–2000	Japan	15	(4)
Medal record
Nagoya Grampus Eight
Runner-up	J1 League	1996
Winner	Emperor's Cup	1995
Winner	Emperor's Cup	1999
Júbilo Iwata
Runner-up	J1 League	2001
Runner-up	J.League Cup	2001
Tokyo Verdy
Winner	Emperor's Cup	2004
- * Club domestic league appearances and goals

Takashi Hirano (平野 孝, Hirano Takashi; born July 15, 1974) is a Japanese former professional footballer who played as a midfielder. He played for the Japan national team.

== Club career ==
Hirano attended Shimizu Shogyo High School, where he won the All Japan High School Soccer Tournament in 1991.

Hirano began his professional career in the J1 League in 1993, with Nagoya Grampus Eight, winning the Emperor's Cup in 1995 and 1999 and the Japanese Super Cup in 1996, and scoring 43 goals in 213 appearances for the team. He transferred to Kyoto Purple Sanga in 2000, and although his team won promotion from the J2 League in 2001, he played just 5 league games before moving on to Júbilo Iwata.

After brief and largely unremarkable stints at Vissel Kobe, Tokyo Verdy, Yokohama F. Marinos and Omiya Ardija, Hirano moved to North America and signed for Vancouver Whitecaps in the USL First Division in 2008.

On September 30, 2008, Hirano was called up to the USL First Division All-League Team, and on October 12, 2008, helped the Whitecaps capture their second USL First Division Championship by beating the Puerto Rico Islanders 2–1 in the USL1 Championship game.

On January 20, 2009 the Whitecaps announced a contract extension for Hirano for the 2009 season.

Hirano announced his retirement from the game in January 2011.

== International career ==
Hirano played for the Japan U-20 national team, which competed at the 1992 AFC Youth Championship.

On June 8, 1997, he debuted and scored a goal for Japan national team against Croatia. He also participated in the 1998 World Cup qualification in 1997. In 1998, he was selected for Japan's squad in the 1998 World Cup, playing two games as a substitute. He played 15 games and scored 4 goals for Japan until 2000.

== Career statistics ==
=== Club ===
Appearances and goals by club, season and competition
Club	Season	League			National cup (Note: Includes Emperor's Cup, Open Cup)		League cup (Note: Includes J.League Cup)		Total	
Club	Season	Division	Apps	Goals	Apps	Goals	Apps	Goals	Apps	Goals
Nagoya Grampus Eight	1993	J1 League	19	4	3	1	3	1	25	6
Nagoya Grampus Eight	1994	J1 League	36	4	2	0	1	0	39	4
Nagoya Grampus Eight	1995	J1 League	50	9	5	2	–		55	11
Nagoya Grampus Eight	1996	J1 League	29	7	0	0	14	5	43	12
Nagoya Grampus Eight	1997	J1 League	21	4	1	0	6	3	28	7
Nagoya Grampus Eight	1998	J1 League	30	8	4	0	0	0	34	8
Nagoya Grampus Eight	1999	J1 League	28	7	5	1	6	2	39	10
Nagoya Grampus Eight	2000	J1 League	9	0	0	0	0	0	9	0
Nagoya Grampus Eight	Total		222	43	20	4	30	11	272	58
Kyoto Purple Sanga	2000	J1 League	7	1	1	0	4	0	12	1
Júbilo Iwata	2001	J1 League	3	0	1	0	0	0	4	0
Vissel Kobe	2002	J1 League	28	1	1	0	5	0	34	1
Tokyo Verdy	2003	J1 League	25	4	3	1	5	0	33	5
Tokyo Verdy	2004	J1 League	28	4	1	0	7	1	36	5
Tokyo Verdy	2005	J1 League	27	0	1	1	6	0	34	1
Tokyo Verdy	Total		80	8	5	2	18	1	103	11
Yokohama F. Marinos	2006	J1 League	9	0	0	0	6	0	15	0
Omiya Ardija	2007	J1 League	3	1	1	0	0	0	4	1
Vancouver Whitecaps	2008	USL First Division	22	1					22	1
Vancouver Whitecaps	2009	USL First Division	28	0					28	0
Vancouver Whitecaps	2010	D2 Pro League	15	0					15	0
Vancouver Whitecaps	Total		65	1					65	1
Career total			417	55	29	6	63	12	509	73

=== International ===
Appearances and goals by national team and year
National team	Year	Apps	Goals
Japan	1997	5	1
Japan	1998	7	2
Japan	1999	0	0
Japan	2000	3	1
Total		15	4

Scores and results list Japan's goal tally first, score column indicates score after each Hirano goal.

List of international goals scored by Takashi Hirano
No.	Date	Venue	Opponent	Score	Result	Competition
1	8 June 1997	Tokyo, Japan	Croatia	1–0	4–3	1997 Kirin Cup
2	15 February 1998	Adelaide, Australia	Australia	2–0	3–0	Friendly
3	15 February 1998	Adelaide, Australia	Australia	3–0	3–0	Friendly
4	16 February 2000	Macau, China	Brunei	6–0	9–0	2000 AFC Asian Cup qualification

== Honors ==
Nagoya Grampus Eight

- Emperor's Cup: 1995, 1999
- Japanese Super Cup: 1996

Tokyo Verdy 1969

- Emperor's Cup: 2004
- Japanese Super Cup: 2005

Vancouver Whitecaps

- USL First Division Championship: 2008
- Vancouver Whitecaps Outstanding Defender: 2009
- Vancouver Whitecaps Newcomer of the Year: 2008
