= Hiroki Mihara =

Japanese footballer

Hiroki Mihara 三原 廣樹
Personal information
- Full name: Hiroki Mihara
- Date of birth: April 20, 1978 (age 48)
- Place of birth: Saga, Japan
- Height: 1.81 m (5 ft 11 1/2 in)
- Position: Midfielder

Youth career
- 1994–1996: Saga Commercial High School

Senior career*
Years	Team	Apps	(Gls)
1997–2002	Nagoya Grampus Eight	0	(0)
1999	→ Universitatea Craiova (loan)		
2000	→ Sagan Tosu (loan)	22	(5)
2002	Avispa Fukuoka	14	(1)
2003–2005	Consadole Sapporo	41	(1)
2006–2007	FC Ryukyu	34	(4)
Total		111	(11)
Medal record
Nagoya Grampus Eight
Winner	Emperor's Cup	1999
- * Club domestic league appearances and goals

Hiroki Mihara (三原 廣樹, Mihara Hiroki; born April 20, 1978) is a former Japanese football player.

== Playing career ==
Mihara was born in Saga Prefecture on April 20, 1978. After graduating from high school, he joined J1 League club Nagoya Grampus Eight in 1997. However he could not play at all in the match until 2000. He also played for Romanian club Universitatea Craiova in 1999. In June 2000, he moved to his local club Sagan Tosu in J2 League with Jiro Yabe on loan. He played as regular player. In 2001, he returned to Nagoya Grampus Eight. However he could hardly play in the match. In June 2002, he moved to J2 club Avispa Fukuoka and played many matches. In 2003, he moved to J2 club Consadole Sapporo. However he could not play many matches for injuries. In 2006, he moved to Japan Football League club FC Ryukyu. He retired end of 2007 season.

== Career statistics ==
Appearances and goals by club, season and competition
Club	Season	League			Emperor's Cup		J.League Cup		Total	
Club	Season	Division	Apps	Goals	Apps	Goals	Apps	Goals	Apps	Goals
Nagoya Grampus Eight	1997	J1 League	0	0	0	0	0	0	0	0
Nagoya Grampus Eight	1998	J1 League	0	0	0	0	0	0	0	0
Nagoya Grampus Eight	1999	J1 League	0	0	0	0	0	0	0	0
Nagoya Grampus Eight	2000	J1 League	0	0	0	0	0	0	0	0
Sagan Tosu	2000	J2 League	22	5	3	2	0	0	25	7
Nagoya Grampus Eight	2001	J1 League	0	0	0	0	0	0	0	0
Nagoya Grampus Eight	2002	J1 League	0	0	0	0	2	0	2	0
Avispa Fukuoka	2002	J2 League	14	1	0	0	—		14	1
Consadole Sapporo	2003	J2 League	17	0	3	0	—		20	0
Consadole Sapporo	2004	J2 League	4	0	0	0	—		4	0
Consadole Sapporo	2005	J2 League	20	1	1	0	—		21	1
FC Ryukyu	2006	Football League	11	1	—		—		11	1
FC Ryukyu	2007	Football League	23	3	—		—		23	3
Career total			111	11	7	2	2	0	120	13
