= Takafumi Ogura =

Japanese footballer and manager

Takafumi Ogura 小倉 隆史
Personal information
- Full name: Takafumi Ogura
- Date of birth: July 6, 1973 (age 53)
- Place of birth: Suzuka, Mie, Japan
- Height: 1.82 m (6 ft 0 in)
- Position: Forward

Youth career
- 1989–1991: Yokkaichi Chuo Technical High School

Senior career*
Years	Team	Apps	(Gls)
1992–1999	Nagoya Grampus Eight	90	(21)
1993–1994	→ Excelsior (loan)	31	(14)
2000	JEF United Ichihara	24	(3)
2001	Tokyo Verdy	25	(3)
2002	Consadole Sapporo	27	(7)
2003–2005	Ventforet Kofu	75	(18)
Total		272	(66)

International career
1994	Japan	5	(1)

Managerial career
- 2016: Nagoya Grampus
Medal record
Nagoya Grampus Eight
Runner-up	J1 League	1996
Winner	Emperor's Cup	1995
Winner	Emperor's Cup	1999
- * Club domestic league appearances and goals

Takafumi Ogura (小倉 隆史, Ogura Takafumi; born July 6, 1973) is a former Japanese football player and manager. He played for the Japan national team.

== Club career ==
Ogura was born in Suzuka on July 6, 1973. After graduating from high school, he joined Nagoya Grampus Eight in 1992. In 1993, he moved to Eerste Divisie club Excelsior on loan. He returned to Nagoya in 1994. In 1995, Nagoya won the Emperor's Cup, the first major title in the club's history. In the Final against Sanfrecce Hiroshima, Ogura scored 2 goals. However, an injury he sustained in 1996 required him to undergo several operations, decreasing his opportunities to play upon his return. In the early 2000s, he played for JEF United Ichihara (2000), Tokyo Verdy (2001) and Consadole Sapporo (2002). In 2003, he moved to J2 League club Ventforet Kofu. He played there until his retirement in 2005.

== National team career ==
On May 22, 1994, Ogura debuted for the Japan national team against Australia. On May 29, Ogura scored a goal against France. He also played at the 1994 Asian Games. In total, he played 5 games and scored 1 goal for Japan.

== Coaching career ==
In June 2015, Ogura became the assistant general manager at Nagoya Grampus. In 2016, he became the club's manager. He resigned in August of the same year.

== Club statistics ==
Club performance			League		Cup		League Cup		Total	
Season	Club	League	Apps	Goals	Apps	Goals	Apps	Goals	Apps	Goals
Japan			League		Emperor's Cup		J.League Cup		Total	
1992	Nagoya Grampus Eight	J1 League	-		0	0	10	5	10	5
Netherlands			League		KNVB Cup		League Cup		Total	
1993/94	Excelsior	Eerste Divisie	31	14	2	4	-		33	18
Japan			League		Emperor's Cup		J.League Cup		Total	
1994	Nagoya Grampus Eight	J1 League	23	5	2	0	1	0	26	5
1995	Nagoya Grampus Eight	J1 League	37	14	5	5	-		42	19
1996	Nagoya Grampus Eight	J1 League	14	1	0	0	4	2	18	3
1997	Nagoya Grampus Eight	J1 League	0	0	0	0	0	0	0	0
1998	Nagoya Grampus Eight	J1 League	13	1	2	1	0	0	15	2
1999	Nagoya Grampus Eight	J1 League	3	0	0	0	4	0	7	0
2000	JEF United Ichihara	J1 League	24	3	3	1	1	1	28	5
2001	Tokyo Verdy	J1 League	25	3	3	0	1	0	29	3
2002	Consadole Sapporo	J1 League	27	7	1	0	6	1	34	8
2003	Ventforet Kofu	J2 League	27	10	3	1	-		30	11
2004	Ventforet Kofu	J2 League	40	6	1	0	-		41	6
2005	Ventforet Kofu	J2 League	8	2	0	0	-		8	2
Country	Japan		241	52	20	8	27	9	288	69
Country	Netherlands		31	14	2	4	-		33	18
Total			272	66	22	12	27	9	321	87

== National team statistics ==
Japan national team
Year	Apps	Goals
1994	5	1
Total	5	1

== Managerial statistics ==
Team	From	To	Record				
Team	From	To	G	W	D	L	Win %
Nagoya Grampus	2016	2016	26	4	7	15	15.38
Total			26	4	7	15	15.38
