= Jiro Yabe =

Japanese footballer and manager

Jiro Yabe 矢部 次郎
Personal information
- Full name: Jiro Yabe
- Date of birth: May 26, 1978 (age 48)
- Place of birth: Aichi, Japan
- Height: 1.73 m (5 ft 8 in)
- Position: Midfielder

Youth career
- 1994–1996: Nara Ikuei High School

Senior career*
| Years | Team | Apps | (Gls) |
| 1997–2000 | Nagoya Grampus Eight | 0 | (0) |
| 2000–2004 | Sagan Tosu | 136 | (11) |
| 2005–2006 | Arte Takasaki | 43 | (5) |
| 2008–2011 | Nara Club | 29 | (10) |
| Total | | 208 | (26) |

Managerial career
- 2012–2013: Nara Club
Medal record
Nagoya Grampus Eight
| Winner | Emperor's Cup | 1999 |
- * Club domestic league appearances and goals

Jiro Yabe (矢部 次郎, Yabe Jiro; born May 26, 1978) is a former Japanese football player and manager.

== Playing career ==
Yabe was born in Aichi Prefecture on May 26, 1978. After graduating from high school, he joined his local club Nagoya Grampus Eight in 1997. However he could not play at all in the match. In June 2000, he moved to J2 League club Sagan Tosu with Hiroki Mihara. He became a regular player and played many matches for a long time. In 2005, he moved to Japan Football League club FC Horikoshi (later Arte Takasaki). Although he played as regular player in 2005, his opportunity to play decreased for injury in 2006 and he was sacked in July. After a year and a half blank, he joined Nara Club in 2008. He retired end of 2011 season.

== Coaching career ==
After retirement, Yabe became a general manager for Nara Club in 2012. In July 2012, he became a manager and managed the club until October 2013.

== Career statistics ==
Appearances and goals by club, season and competition
| Club | Season | League | | | Emperor's Cup | | J.League Cup | | Total | |
| Club | Season | Division | Apps | Goals | Apps | Goals | Apps | Goals | Apps | Goals |
|---|---|---|---|---|---|---|---|---|---|---|
| Nagoya Grampus Eight | 1997 | J1 League | 0 | 0 | 0 | 0 | 0 | 0 | 0 | 0 |
| Nagoya Grampus Eight | 1998 | J1 League | 0 | 0 | 0 | 0 | 0 | 0 | 0 | 0 |
| Nagoya Grampus Eight | 1999 | J1 League | 0 | 0 | 0 | 0 | 0 | 0 | 0 | 0 |
| Nagoya Grampus Eight | 2000 | J1 League | 0 | 0 | 0 | 0 | 0 | 0 | 0 | 0 |
| Sagan Tosu | 2000 | J2 League | 20 | 2 | 1 | 1 | 0 | 0 | 21 | 3 |
| Sagan Tosu | 2001 | J2 League | 33 | 4 | 4 | 0 | 0 | 0 | 37 | 4 |
| Sagan Tosu | 2002 | J2 League | 40 | 3 | 3 | 1 | - | | 43 | 4 |
| Sagan Tosu | 2003 | J2 League | 13 | 0 | 1 | 0 | - | | 14 | 0 |
| Sagan Tosu | 2004 | J2 League | 30 | 2 | 2 | 0 | - | | 32 | 2 |
| FC Horikoshi | 2005 | Football League | 29 | 4 | 2 | 0 | - | | 31 | 4 |
| Arte Takasaki | 2006 | Football League | 14 | 1 | 0 | 0 | - | | 14 | 1 |
| Nara Club | 2008 | Prefectural Leagues | 5 | 5 | - | | - | | 5 | 5 |
| Nara Club | 2009 | Regional Leagues | 6 | 2 | 2 | 1 | - | | 8 | 3 |
| Nara Club | 2010 | Regional Leagues | 7 | 2 | 1 | 0 | - | | 8 | 2 |
| Nara Club | 2011 | Regional Leagues | 11 | 1 | 1 | 0 | - | | 12 | 1 |
| Career total | | | 208 | 26 | 17 | 3 | 0 | 0 | 225 | 29 |
