= Hideaki Tominaga =

Japanese footballer

Hideaki Tominaga 富永 英明
Personal information
- Full name: Hideaki Tominaga
- Date of birth: August 27, 1976 (age 50)
- Place of birth: Fukui, Japan
- Height: 1.89 m (6 ft 2 1/2 in)
- Positions: Forward; defender

Youth career
- 1992–1994: Hokuriku High School
- 1995–1998: Kokushikan University

Senior career*
Years	Team	Apps	(Gls)
1999–2003	Nagoya Grampus Eight	4	(0)
2001	→Sagan Tosu (loan)	16	(2)
2002	→Shonan Bellmare (loan)	32	(1)
2004	Ventforet Kofu	38	(3)
2005–2006	Yokohama FC	45	(3)
2007–2010	Blaublitz Akita	59	(2)
Total		194	(11)
Medal record
Nagoya Grampus Eight
Winner	Emperor's Cup	1999
- * Club domestic league appearances and goals

Hideaki Tominaga (富永 英明, Tominaga Hideaki; born August 27, 1976) is a former Japanese football player.

== Playing career ==
Tominaga was born in Fukui Prefecture on August 27, 1976. After graduating from Kokushikan University, he joined J1 League club Nagoya Grampus Eight in 1999. Although he played as forward, he could hardly play in the match until 2000. In 2001, he moved to J2 League club Sagan Tosu. Although he played forward, he was converted to center back in late 2001. In 2002, he moved to J2 club Shonan Bellmare and played many matches as center back. In 2003, he returned to Nagoya Grampus Eight. However he could hardly play in the match. In 2004, he moved to J2 club Ventforet Kofu. He became a regular player as defensive midfielder. In 2005, he moved to J2 club Yokohama FC. He played many matches as many position as substitute. In 2006, although the club won the champions and was promoted to J1 from 2007, he could not play many matches. In 2008, he moved to Japan Football League club TDK (later Blaublitz Akita). He retired at the end of the 2010 season.

== Career statistics ==
Appearances and goals by club, season and competition
Club	Season	League			Emperor's Cup		J.League Cup		Total	
Club	Season	Division	Apps	Goals	Apps	Goals	Apps	Goals	Apps	Goals
Nagoya Grampus Eight	1999	J1 League	0	0	0	0	1	0	1	0
Nagoya Grampus Eight	2000	J1 League	1	0	0	0	0	0	1	0
Sagan Tosu	2001	J2 League	16	2	4	1	0	0	20	3
Shonan Bellmare	2002	J2 League	32	1	1	0	—		33	1
Nagoya Grampus Eight	2003	J1 League	3	0	0	0	1	0	4	0
Ventforet Kofu	2004	J2 League	38	3	1	0	—		39	3
Yokohama FC	2005	J2 League	30	3	1	0	—		31	3
Yokohama FC	2006	J2 League	15	0	1	0	—		16	0
TDK	2007	Football League	15	2	0	0	—		15	2
TDK	2008	Football League	13	0	1	0	—		14	0
TDK	2009	Football League	30	0	0	0	—		30	0
Blaublitz Akita	2010	Football League	1	0	0	0	—		1	0
Career total			194	11	9	1	2	0	205	12
