= Kotaro Yamazaki =

Japanese footballer

Kotaro Yamazaki 山崎 光太郎
Personal information
- Full name: Kotaro Yamazaki
- Date of birth: October 19, 1978 (age 48)
- Place of birth: Shizuoka, Japan
- Height: 1.65 m (5 ft 5 in)
- Position: Forward

Youth career
- 1994–1996: Shimizu Higashi High School
- 1999–2000: Chukyo University

Senior career*
| Years | Team | Apps | (Gls) |
| 1997–1998 | Nagoya Grampus Eight | 0 | (0) |
| 2001–2002 | Shimizu S-Pulse | 9 | (0) |
| 2003–2007 | Ventforet Kofu | 73 | (10) |
| Total | | 82 | (10) |

International career
| 1995 | Japan U-17 | 3 | (1) |
Medal record
Shimizu S-Pulse
| Winner | Emperor's Cup | 2001 |
Representing Japan
AFC U-16 Championship
| Gold medal – first place | 1994 Qatar |
- * Club domestic league appearances and goals

Kotaro Yamazaki (山崎 光太郎, Yamazaki Kotaro; born October 19, 1978) is a former Japanese football player.

== Club career ==
Yamazaki was born in Shizuoka on October 19, 1978. After graduating from Shimizu Higashi High School, he joined Nagoya Grampus Eight in 1997. He also entered in Chukyo University. However he had no opportunity to play at Grampus. He left Grampus and joined Chukyo University team in 1999. After graduating from the university, he joined his local club Shimizu S-Pulse in 2001. He moved to J2 League club Ventforet Kofu in 2003. The club was promoted to J1 League in 2006. He retired end of 2007 season.

== National team career ==
In August 1995, Yamazaki was selected Japan U-17 national team for 1995 U-17 World Championship. He played all 3 matches and scored a goal against United States.

== Club statistics ==
| Club performance | | | League | | Cup | | League Cup | | Total | |
| Season | Club | League | Apps | Goals | Apps | Goals | Apps | Goals | Apps | Goals |
| Japan | | | League | | Emperor's Cup | | J.League Cup | | Total | |
|---|---|---|---|---|---|---|---|---|---|---|
| 1997 | Nagoya Grampus Eight | J1 League | 0 | 0 | 0 | 0 | 0 | 0 | 0 | 0 |
| 1998 | Nagoya Grampus Eight | J1 League | 0 | 0 | 0 | 0 | 0 | 0 | 0 | 0 |
| 2001 | Shimizu S-Pulse | J1 League | 9 | 0 | 1 | 0 | 1 | 0 | 11 | 0 |
| 2002 | Shimizu S-Pulse | J1 League | 0 | 0 | 0 | 0 | 2 | 0 | 2 | 0 |
| 2003 | Ventforet Kofu | J2 League | 13 | 2 | 2 | 1 | - | | 15 | 3 |
| 2004 | Ventforet Kofu | J2 League | 18 | 5 | 1 | 0 | - | | 19 | 5 |
| 2005 | Ventforet Kofu | J2 League | 10 | 1 | 0 | 0 | - | | 10 | 1 |
| 2006 | Ventforet Kofu | J1 League | 18 | 2 | 1 | 0 | 4 | 3 | 23 | 5 |
| 2007 | Ventforet Kofu | J1 League | 14 | 0 | 0 | 0 | 2 | 0 | 16 | 0 |
| Career total | | | 82 | 10 | 5 | 1 | 9 | 3 | 80 | 14 |
