= Tetsuhiro Kina =

Japanese footballer

Tetsuhiro Kina 喜名 哲裕
Personal information
- Full name: Tetsuhiro Kina
- Date of birth: 10 December 1976 (age 49)
- Place of birth: Naha, Japan
- Height: 1.78 m (5 ft 10 in)
- Position: Midfielder

Team information
- Current team: Kagoshima United (assistant)

Youth career
- 1992–1994: Naha Nishi High School

Senior career*
Years	Team	Apps	(Gls)
1995–1999	Nagoya Grampus Eight	55	(1)
2000–2003	FC Tokyo	57	(0)
2004	Omiya Ardija	15	(0)
2005	Avispa Fukuoka	19	(0)
2006	Tokyo Verdy	16	(0)
2007–2009	Roasso Kumamoto	56	(0)
2010–2011	Okinawa Kaiho Bank	8	(0)
Total		226	(1)

Managerial career
- 2021-2022: FC Ryukyu
- 2023: FC Ryukyu
- * Club domestic league appearances and goals

Tetsuhiro Kina (喜名 哲裕, Kina Tetsuhiro; born 10 December 1976) is a Japanese professional manager and former player. He is currently the assistant manager of J3 League club Kagoshima United.

== Playing career ==
Kina was born in Naha on 10 December 1976. After graduating from high school, he joined Nagoya Grampus Eight in 1995. He debuted in 1995 and played many matches as central midfielder from 1996. However he could not play at all in the match for injury from 1998. In 2000, he moved to newly-promoted club FC Tokyoin the J1 League. He played as a central midfielder. However, the arrival of Masashi Miyazawa in 2002 limited his chances and in 2004, he moved to J2 League club Omiya Ardija. He tried his luck with two more J2 sides, Avispa Fukuoka and Tokyo Verdy, without much success. In 2007, he moved to Japan Football League club Rosso Kumamoto (later Roasso Kumamoto). He played regularly as the club was promoted to the J2 League in 2008. In 2010, he moved to Regional League club Okinawa Kaiho Bank. He retired at the end of the 2011 season.

== Managerial career ==
On the 20 October 2021, Kina was appointed manager of FC Ryukyu. After a poor run of results, he was sacked on 6 June 2022.

By 16 May 2023, Kina was named interim manager at FC Ryukyu.

== Career statistics ==
Appearances and goals by club, season and competition
Club	Season	League			Emperor's Cup		J.League Cup		Total	
Club	Season	Division	Apps	Goals	Apps	Goals	Apps	Goals	Apps	Goals
Nagoya Grampus Eight	1995	J1 League	5	0	0	0	—		5	0
Nagoya Grampus Eight	1996	J1 League	24	1	1	0	13	0	38	1
Nagoya Grampus Eight	1997	J1 League	26	0	0	0	7	1	33	1
Nagoya Grampus Eight	1998	J1 League	0	0	0	0	0	0	0	0
Nagoya Grampus Eight	1999	J1 League	0	0	0	0	0	0	0	0
Nagoya Grampus Eight	Total		55	1	1	0	20	1	76	2
FC Tokyo	2000	J1 League	22	0	1	0	1	0	24	0
FC Tokyo	2001	J1 League	23	0	1	0	3	0	27	0
FC Tokyo	2002	J1 League	12	0	0	0	0	0	12	0
FC Tokyo	2003	J1 League	0	0	0	0	0	0	0	0
FC Tokyo	Total		57	0	2	0	4	0	63	0
Omiya Ardija	2004	J2 League	15	0	0	0	—		15	0
Avispa Fukuoka	2005	J2 League	19	0	0	0	—		19	0
Tokyo Verdy	2006	J2 League	16	0	1	0	—		17	0
Roasso Kumamoto	2007	JFL	25	0	1	0	—		26	0
Roasso Kumamoto	2008	J2 League	30	0	0	0	—		30	0
Roasso Kumamoto	2009	J2 League	1	0	0	0	—		1	0
Roasso Kumamoto	Total		56	0	1	0	—		57	0
Okinawa Kaiho Bank	2010	Regional Leagues	6	0	—		—		6	0
Okinawa Kaiho Bank	2011	Regional Leagues	2	0	1	0	—		3	0
Okinawa Kaiho Bank	Total		8	0	1	0	—		9	0
Career total			226	1	6	0	24	1	256	2
