= Ryuta Hara =

Japanese footballer

Ryuta Hara 原 竜太
Personal information
- Full name: Ryuta Hara
- Date of birth: April 19, 1981 (age 45)
- Place of birth: Meguro, Tokyo, Japan
- Height: 1.72 m (5 ft 7 1/2 in)
- Position: Forward

Youth career
- 1997–1999: Funabashi High School

Senior career*
Years	Team	Apps	(Gls)
2000–2003	Nagoya Grampus Eight	51	(9)
2004	Kyoto Purple Sanga	12	(0)
2005–2006	Montedio Yamagata	63	(17)
2007–2009	Shonan Bellmare	81	(17)
Total		207	(43)
- * Club domestic league appearances and goals

Ryuta Hara (原 竜太, Hara Ryūta; born April 19, 1981) is a former Japanese football player.

== Playing career ==
Hara was born in Meguro, Tokyo on April 19, 1981. After graduating from high school, he joined J1 League club Nagoya Grampus Eight in 2000. He played many matches as substitute forward until 2003. In 2004, he moved to J2 League club Kyoto Purple Sanga. However he could not play many matches. In 2005, he moved to J2 club Montedio Yamagata. He played as regular player and scored many goals in 2005. However he played many matches as substitute forward in 2006 and was released from the club at the end of the 2006 season. In 2007, he moved to J2 club Shonan Bellmare. He played many matches until 2008. However his opportunity to play decreased in 2009 and he retired at the end of the 2009 season.

== Career statistics ==
Appearances and goals by club, season and competition
Club	Season	League			Emperor's Cup		J.League Cup		Total	
Club	Season	Division	Apps	Goals	Apps	Goals	Apps	Goals	Apps	Goals
Nagoya Grampus Eight	2000	J1 League	12	2	2	0	2	0	16	2
Nagoya Grampus Eight	2001	J1 League	2	1	0	0	2	0	4	1
Nagoya Grampus Eight	2002	J1 League	18	5	3	2	2	0	23	7
Nagoya Grampus Eight	2003	J1 League	19	1	0	0	5	0	24	1
Kyoto Purple Sanga	2004	J2 League	12	0	1	2	—		13	2
Montedio Yamagata	2005	J2 League	36	12	0	0	—		36	12
Montedio Yamagata	2006	J2 League	27	5	2	1	—		29	6
Shonan Bellmare	2007	J2 League	39	11	2	1	—		41	12
Shonan Bellmare	2008	J2 League	31	5	1	1	—		32	6
Shonan Bellmare	2009	J2 League	11	1	1	0	—		12	1
Career total			207	43	12	7	11	0	230	50
