= Ko Ishikawa =

Bolivian footballer (born 1970)

Ko Ishikawa 石川 巧
Personal information
- Full name: Ko Ishikawa
- Date of birth: March 10, 1970 (age 56)
- Place of birth: Santa Cruz de la Sierra, Bolivia
- Height: 1.70 m (5 ft 7 in)
- Position: Defender

Youth career
- Academia Tauichi Aguilera
- 1988: Bunan High School

Senior career*
Years	Team	Apps	(Gls)
1989–1992	Honda	50	(0)
1992–1997	Verdy Kawasaki	134	(2)
1998–2002	Nagoya Grampus Eight	105	(2)
Total		289	(4)
Medal record
Honda
Runner-up	JSL Cup	1991
Verdy Kawasaki
Winner	J1 League	1993
Winner	J1 League	1994
Runner-up	J1 League	1995
Winner	J.League Cup	1992
Winner	J.League Cup	1993
Winner	J.League Cup	1994
Runner-up	J.League Cup	1996
Winner	Emperor's Cup	1996
Runner-up	Emperor's Cup	1992
Nagoya Grampus Eight
Winner	Emperor's Cup	1999
- * Club domestic league appearances and goals

Ko Ishikawa (石川 巧, Ishikawa Ko; born March 10, 1970) is a Bolivian former footballer.

== Club career ==
Ishikawa established himself as one of the most unflappable defenders in the league as a side back at Verdy Kawasaki in the early 1990s, and he maintained that reputation for almost ten years. Though his speed on the overlap began to fade as he got older, Ishikawa was a key contributor on offense as well, with a very accurate cross. Born in Bolivia to a Japanese foreign affairs official, he began playing football at a young age for the renowned and prestigious Academia Tahuichi Aguilera. Considering his good form, Ishikawa was selected to play for Bolivia in the 1985 U-16 World Championship held in China and the 1987 U-16 World Championship held in Canada. In his younger years, when he had the speed to outrun defenders down the right wing, he could be truly dangerous on both ends, but his specialty was always on defense. He developed good instincts and positioning during a short stint in Brazil, before the J1 League was created, and returned to Japan to join Verdy Kawasaki in 1992 as one of the new league's young stars. He was a member of two championship teams with Verdy, and helped Nagoya Grampus Eight to an Emperor's Cup crown. Even though he maintained a steady level of performance through the years, he was never considered for the Japan national team.

== Club statistics ==
Club performance			League		Cup		League Cup		Total	
Season	Club	League	Apps	Goals	Apps	Goals	Apps	Goals	Apps	Goals
Japan			League		Emperor's Cup		J.League Cup		Total	
1989/90	Honda	JSL Division 1	14	0			0	0	14	0
1990/91	Honda	JSL Division 1	17	0			4	0	21	0
1991/92	Honda	JSL Division 1	19	0			4	0	23	0
1992	Verdy Kawasaki	J1 League	-		5	0	8	0	13	0
1993	Verdy Kawasaki	J1 League	22	1	2	0	7	0	31	1
1994	Verdy Kawasaki	J1 League	40	1	2	0	3	0	45	1
1995	Verdy Kawasaki	J1 League	27	0	1	0	-		28	0
1996	Verdy Kawasaki	J1 League	19	0	1	0	16	0	36	0
1997	Verdy Kawasaki	J1 League	26	0	2	0	6	0	34	0
1998	Nagoya Grampus Eight	J1 League	33	0	4	0	1	0	38	0
1999	Nagoya Grampus Eight	J1 League	29	0	3	0	6	0	38	1
2000	Nagoya Grampus Eight	J1 League	27	1	2	0	6	0	31	1
2001	Nagoya Grampus Eight	J1 League	15	0	0	0	4	0	19	0
2002	Nagoya Grampus Eight	J1 League	1	0	0	0	0	0	1	0
Total			289	4	22	0	65	0	376	4

== Club titles ==
Season	Club	Title
1993	Verdy Kawasaki	J1 League
1994	Verdy Kawasaki	J1 League
