= Ricardinho (footballer, born 1975) =

Brazilian footballer

Personal information
- Full name: Ricardo Souza Silva
- Date of birth: November 26, 1975 (age 50)
- Place of birth: São Paulo, Brazil
- Height: 1.75 m (5 ft 9 in)
- Position: Attacking midfielder

Team information
- Current team: Portuguesa Santista

Youth career
- 1995–1996: Nacional-SP

Senior career*
Years	Team	Apps	(Gls)
1996	Nacional-SP		
1997	Nagoya Grampus Eight		
1998–1999	Bellmare Hiratsuka		
1999–2000	São Paulo		
2000–2001	Kawasaki Frontale		
2001	Coritiba		
2002	Joinville		
2003	Nacional Madeira		
2003	Fortaleza		
2003	Portimonense		
2004–2005	Paulista		
2005	Internacional		
2006	Palmeiras		
2006	Internacional		
2007	Botafogo		
2007	Coritiba		
2007–2008	Paulista		
2008	Vitória		
2008–2009	Guaratinguetá		
2009	Avaí		
2009	Vila Nova		
2010	Sport		
2010	Brasil de Pelotas		
2011–2012	Bangu		
2012b	Independente de Limeira		
2013–2014	Água Santa		
2015	Nacional de Rolândia		
2016–	Portuguesa Santista		
- * Club domestic league appearances and goals

Ricardo Souza Silva or simply Ricardinho (born November 26, 1975, in São Paulo), is a Brazilian attacking midfielder.

== Club statistics ==
Club performance			League		Cup		League Cup		Total	
Season	Club	League	Apps	Goals	Apps	Goals	Apps	Goals	Apps	Goals
Japan			League		Emperor's Cup		J.League Cup		Total	
1997	Nagoya Grampus Eight	J1 League	22	3	0	0	8	2	30	5
1998	Bellmare Hiratsuka	J1 League	27	11			4	0	31	11
1999	Bellmare Hiratsuka	J1 League	4	0			2	0	6	0
2000	Kawasaki Frontale	J1 League	6	0	0	0	5	2	11	2
2001	Kawasaki Frontale	J2 League	14	3	0	0	0	0	14	3
Total			73	17	0	0	19	4	92	21

== Honours ==
São Paulo

- Campeonato Paulista: 2000

Paulista

- Copa do Brasil: 2005

Vitória

- Campeonato Baiano: 2008

Sport

- Campeonato Pernambucano: 2010
