= Iwate Morioka Stadium =

Multi-use stadium in Morioka, Iwate, Japan

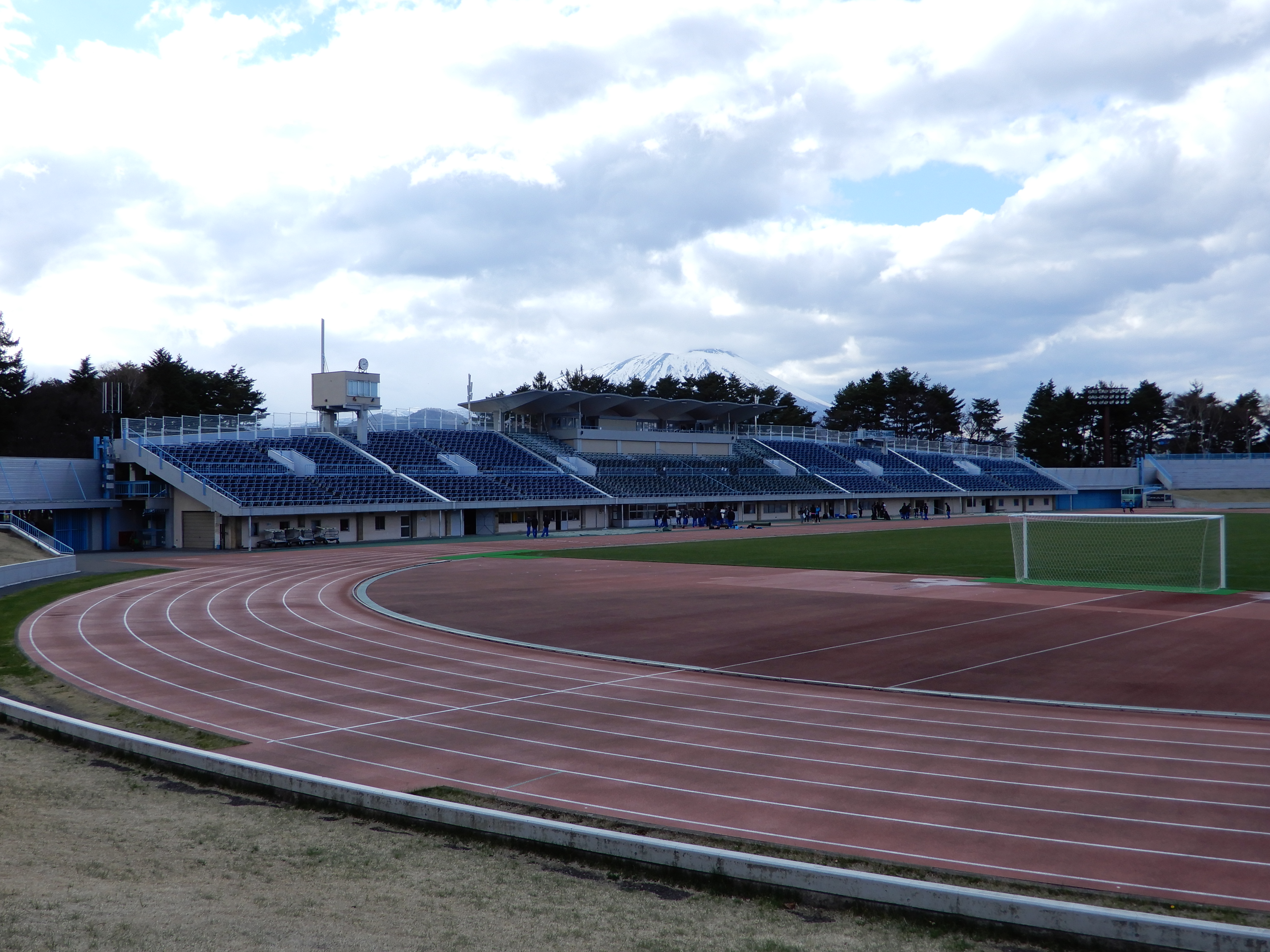

- Location within Iwate Prefecture Location within Japan
- Location: Morioka, Iwate, Japan
- Coordinates: 39°44′19.22″N 141°7′15.16″E
- Owner: Iwate Prefecture
- Capacity: 30,000
- Surface: Grass

Construction
- Opened: 1966
- Renovated: 1999

Tenants
- FC Ganju Iwate; Grulla Morioka

Iwate Morioka Stadium (岩手県営運動公園陸上競技場, Iwate ken'ei Undōkōen rikujō kyōgi-ba) is a multi-use stadium in the city of Morioka, Iwate, Japan.

The stadium was completed in June 1966 to be a venue for track and field events of the 25th National Sports Festival of Japan held in 1970. It was subsequently used for a number of football and rugby matches until the early 1990s; however, it is no longer used for official J.League games as it does not meet the current specifications.

After 1999, the stadium was refurbished. The stadium holds 30,000 people. It is one of Grulla Morioka's home grounds.

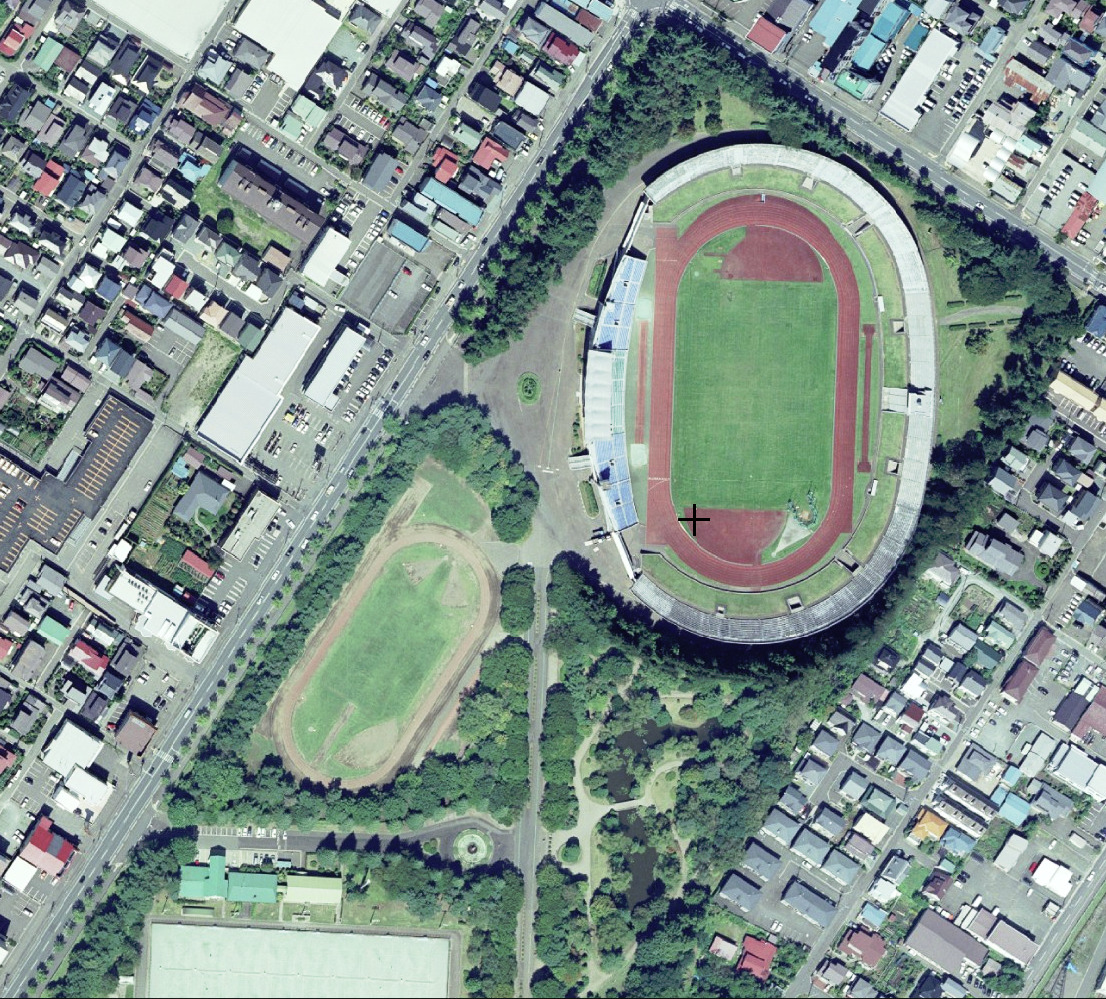
Satellite view in 2008
