= Romildo (footballer, born 1973) =

Brazilian footballer

Personal information
- Full name: Romildo Santos Rosa
- Date of birth: October 25, 1973 (age 53)
- Place of birth: Brazil
- Height: 1.84 m (6 ft 1/2 in)
- Position: Defender

Senior career*
Years	Team	Apps	(Gls)
2000	Nagoya Grampus Eight	10	(0)
- * Club domestic league appearances and goals

Romildo Santos Rosa (born October 25, 1973), known as Romildo, is a former Brazilian football player.

== Club statistics ==
Club performance			League		Cup		League Cup		Total	
Season	Club	League	Apps	Goals	Apps	Goals	Apps	Goals	Apps	Goals
Japan			League		Emperor's Cup		J.League Cup		Total	
2000	Nagoya Grampus Eight	J1 League	10	0	0	0	2	1	12	1
Total			10	0	0	0	2	1	12	1
