= João Carlos (football manager) =

Brazilian football manager

Personal information
- Full name: João Carlos da Silva Costa
- Date of birth: 15 January 1956 (age 70)
- Place of birth: Rio de Janeiro, Brazil

Managerial career
- Years: Team
- 1985: Brazil U-17 NT (assistant)
- 1989: Al Hilal
- 1990–1993: Flamengo (interim)
- 1993–1995: América-SP
- 1996–1998: Kashima Antlers
- 1998: Atlético Paranaense
- 1999: Araçatuba
- 1999: União São João
- 1999: Brazil U-20 NT
- 1999–2001: Nagoya Grampus Eight
- 2001: Cerezo Osaka
- 2002: Flamengo
- 2003: Consadole Sapporo
- 2004–2005: Jamaica NT (assistant)
- 2006: América-SP
- 2007: Al-Tai
- 2007: Tupi
- 2008: CRB-AL
- 2009: Tigres do Brasil
- 2011–2012: Orlando Pirates (assistant)

João Carlos da Silva Costa, best known as João Carlos (born 15 January 1956), is a Brazilian football manager.

== Managerial statistics ==
Team	From	To	Record				
Team	From	To	G	W	D	L	Win %
Kashima Antlers	1996	1998	73	52	0	21	71.23
Nagoya Grampus Eight	1999	2001	53	32	4	17	60.38
Cerezo Osaka	2001	2001	10	2	0	8	20.00
Consadole Sapporo	2003	2003	26	9	9	8	34.62
Total			162	95	13	54	58.64

== Honors ==
- J. League Manager of the Year – 1997
