= Paloma Mizuho Stadium =

Sports venue in Nagoya, Japan

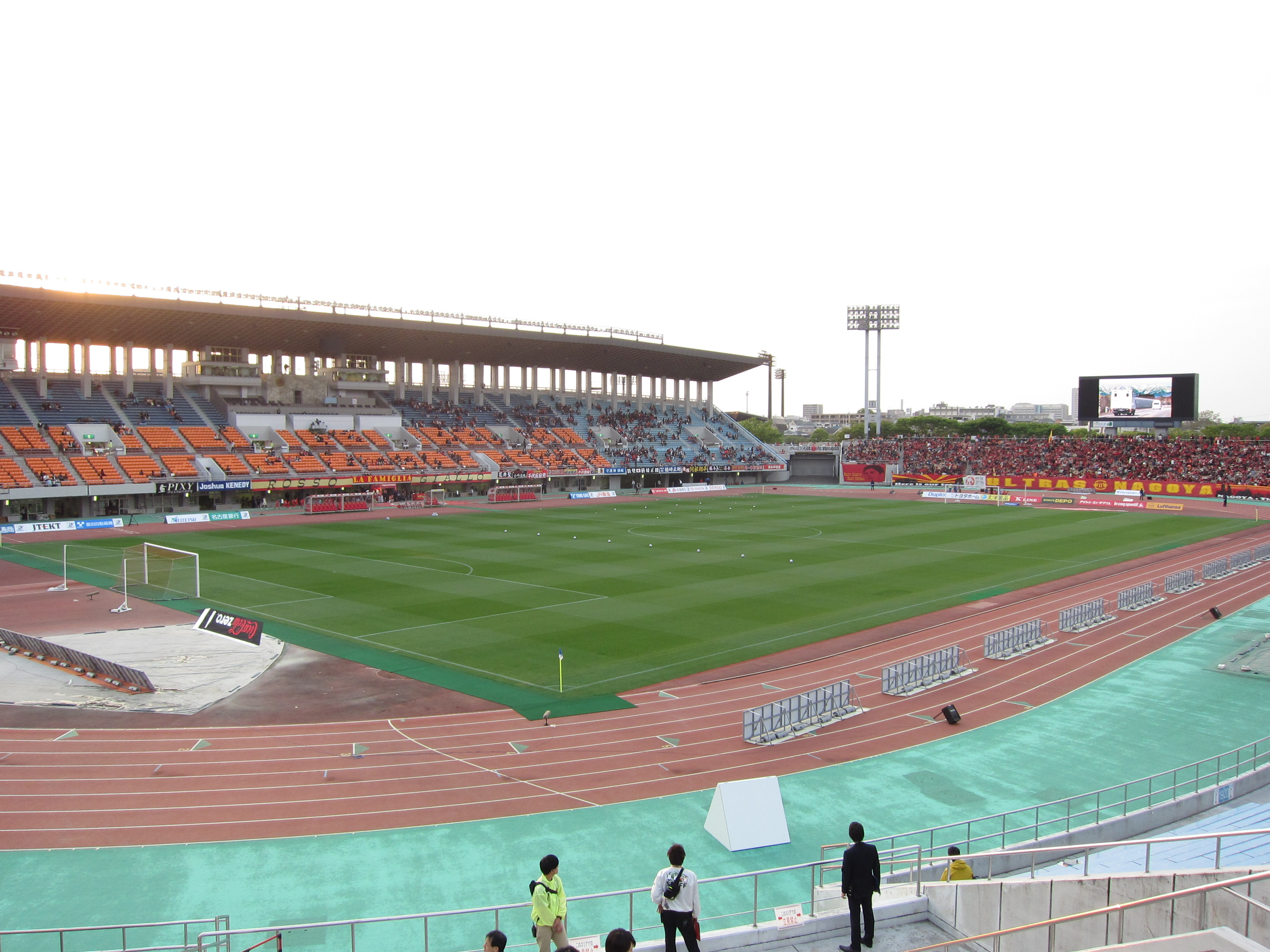
- Mizuho Park stadium in 2011.
- Interactive map of Paloma Mizuho Stadium
- Former names: Nagoya City Mizuho Park Athletics Stadium (1941–2015)
- Location: Nagoya, Aichi Prefecture, Japan
- Coordinates: 35°07′22″N 136°56′39″E
- Owner: Nagoya City
- Capacity: 27,000 (20,000 for Nagoya Grampus league matches)
- Surface: Grass
- Field size: 106 x 68 m
- Public transit: Nagoya Municipal Subway: Meijō Line at Mizuho Undōjō Higashi

Construction
- Opened: 1941
- Renovated: 1950, 1994
- Expanded: 1982
- Closed: November 2021
- Demolished: 2021–2022

Tenant
- Nagoya Grampus

The former Paloma Mizuho Stadium (パロマ瑞穂スタジアム, Paroma Mizuho Sutajiamu) was a multi-purpose stadium in Nagoya, Aichi, Japan.

It was formerly known as Nagoya City Mizuho Park Athletics Stadium (Japanese: 名古屋市瑞穂公園陸上競技場, romanized: Nagoyashi Mizuho Kōen Rikujō Kyōgijō). Since April 2015, it has been called Paloma Mizuho Stadium in accordance with naming rights. The new stadium will be rebuilt to be used for athletics and ceremonies for the 2026 Asian Games.

It was planned to be used as an Olympic venue in Nagoya’s bid plans for the 1988 Summer Olympics, but Nagoya lost the bid to Seoul, South Korea.

== Overview ==
The stadium is used mostly for football matches and is the part-time home stadium of Nagoya Grampus along with Toyota Stadium. The stadium holds 27,000 people and was built in 1941.

It is distinct from Mizuho Rugby Stadium, which has a capacity of 11,900 and is used mainly for rugby, including Top League games.

Due to renovation for the 2026 Asian Games, the stadium was closed in November 2021 and began its demolition process the same month.

== See also ==
- Japan National Stadium – the former stadium in Tokyo which was also demolished and rebuilt to prepared for a big sports tournament like the Olympics and Paralympics games.
