= 1999 Emperor's Cup =

Tournament details
- Country: Japan

Final positions
- Champions: Nagoya Grampus Eight
- Runners-up: Sanfrecce Hiroshima
- Semifinalists: Kashiwa Reysol; Verdy Kawasaki

Statistics of Emperor's Cup in the 1999 season.

== Overview ==
It was contested by 80 teams, and Nagoya Grampus Eight won the championship.

== Results ==
=== First round ===
- Juntendo University 2–0 Aichi Gakuin University
- Tochigi SC 0–2 Júbilo Iwata Youth
- Kusatsu Higashi High School 0–2 Tokyo
- Hatsushiba Hashimoto High School 2–1 Hachinohe University
- Nippon Bunri University 1–2 Sagan Tosu
- Nagoya SC 3–4 Jatco SC
- Maebashi Shogyo High School 1–2 Ventforet Kofu
- Sony Sendai 2–1 Iwate University
- Maruoka High School 1–11 Otsuka Pharmaceuticals
- Yamaguchi Teachers 2–3 Fukuoka University
- Blaze Kumamoto 0–8 Montedio Yamagata
- Okinawa International University 0–2 Teihens FC
- FC Primeiro 0–2 Albirex Niigata
- National Institute of Fitness and Sports in Kanoya 1–0 Konan University
- Nara Sangyo University 2–7 Denso
- Iwami FC 7–3 Tokushima Shogyo High School
- Kunimi High School 0–4 Kokushikan University
- Senshu University 1–0 Yamagata FC
- Hiroshima University 0–6 Oita Trinita
- Kakamihara High School 2–8 ALO's Hokuriku
- Hannan University 1–2 Consadole Sapporo
- Mind House Yokkaichi 2–1 Mitsubishi Motors Mizushima
- Nankoku Kochi FC 3–7 Honda
- Kagawa Shiun Club 4–3 Nissei Industries FC
- Honda Lock 0–5 Vegalta Sendai
- Mito HollyHock 5–1 TDK
- Ibaraki Sakai High School 0–6 Omiya Ardija
- Nirasaki Astros 4–4 (PK 2–4) Doto University
- Ehime FC 0–3 Kawasaki Frontale
- Josai University 4–1 Kyushu INAX
- Ritsumeikan University 2–1 Tsukuba University
- Yokohama FC 8–0 Niigata University

=== Second round ===
- Juntendo University 3–0 Júbilo Iwata Youth
- FC Tokyo 6–0 Hatsushiba Hashimoto High School
- Sagan Tosu 2–1 Jatco SC
- Ventforet Kofu 0–0 (PK 3–4) Sony Sendai
- Otsuka Pharmaceuticals 0–2 Fukuoka University
- Montedio Yamagata 3–0 Teihens FC
- Albirex Niigata 1–0 NIFS Kanoya
- Denso 7–0 Iwami FC
- Kokushikan University 1–2 Senshu University
- Oita Trinita 10–0 ALO's Hokuriku
- Consadole Sapporo 3–0 Mind House Yokkaichi
- Honda FC 6–0 Kagawa Shiun Club
- Vegalta Sendai 1–2 Mito HollyHock
- Omiya Ardija 3–0 Doto University
- Kawasaki Frontale 5–1 Josai University
- Ritsumeikan University 1–4 Yokohama FC

=== Third round ===
- Bellmare Hiratsuka 3–4 FC Tokyo (aet)
- Kashima Antlers 1–0 Sagan Tosu
- Nagoya Grampus Eight 4–0 Sony Sendai
- Cerezo Osaka 4–1 Fukuoka University
- Vissel Kobe 0–0 Montedio Yamagata (aet, 3-4 pen)
- Urawa Red Diamonds 3–1 Albirex Niigata
- Kashiwa Reysol 4–2 Denso
- Kyoto Purple Sanga 1–0 Oita Trinita
- Avispa Fukuoka 1–0 Consadole Sapporo
- Sanfrecce Hiroshima 3–2 Honda FC
- Yokohama F. Marinos 2–1 Mito HollyHock
- Gamba Osaka 1–0 Omiya Ardija
- JEF United Ichihara 2–3 Kawasaki Frontale
- Verdy Kawasaki 3–2 Yokohama FC (aet)
- Jubilo Iwata 2–0 Juntendo University
- Shimizu S-Pulse 2–1 Senshu University

=== Fourth round ===
- Júbilo Iwata 3–0 Tokyo
- Kashima Antlers 1–2 Nagoya Grampus Eight
- Cerezo Osaka 3–4 Montedio Yamagata
- Urawa Red Diamonds 0–2 Kashiwa Reysol
- Shimizu S-Pulse 2–2 (PK 4–2) Kyoto Purple Sanga
- Avispa Fukuoka 1–2 Sanfrecce Hiroshima
- Yokohama F. Marinos 2–1 Gamba Osaka
- Kawasaki Frontale 1–3 Verdy Kawasaki

=== Quarter-finals ===
- Júbilo Iwata 0–1 Nagoya Grampus Eight
- Montedio Yamagata 0–2 Kashiwa Reysol
- Shimizu S-Pulse 0–2 Sanfrecce Hiroshima
- Yokohama F. Marinos 0–1 Verdy Kawasaki

=== Semi-finals ===
- Nagoya Grampus Eight 2–0 Kashiwa Reysol
- Sanfrecce Hiroshima 7–2 Verdy Kawasaki

=== Final ===
- Nagoya Grampus Eight 2–0 Sanfrecce Hiroshima

Nagoya Grampus Eight won the championship.
