= Suzuki (surname) =

Suzuki 鈴木
- Pronunciation: IPA: [sɨzɨkʲi] approx: SOO-ZOO-KYEE

Origin
- Language: Japanese
- Meaning: "the ears of rice piled up" in the dialect of southern Wakayama and Mie prefectures
- Region of origin: Japan

Suzuki (written: 鈴木 lit. "bell wood", "bell tree" or "bud tree") is a Japanese surname. As of 2008, it is the second most common surname in Japan, after Satō, with 1.9 million people registered. It is said to have been named by the Hozumi clan (穂積氏) in the Heian period (794–1185), after suzuki, which means "the ears of rice piled up" in the dialect of southern Wakayama and Mie prefectures (also known as Kumano). 鈴木 are ateji.

== People with the surname ==
- Aguri Suzuki (鈴木 亜久里; born 1960), Japanese racing driver
- Aiko Suzuki (1937–2005), Canadian textile and visual artist
- Aina Suzuki (鈴木 愛奈; born 1995), Japanese voice actress
- Airi Suzuki (鈴木 愛理; born 1994), Japanese singer, actress, model and radio personality
- Airi Suzuki (violinist) (鈴木 愛理; born 1989), Japanese violinist
- Akie Suzuki (鈴木 明恵; born 1987), Japanese gravure idol, television personality and actress
- Akihiko Suzuki (鈴木 昭彦; born 1945), Japanese bobsledder
- Akio Suzuki (鈴木 章夫; 1929–2010), Japanese surgeon, medical scientist and educator
- Akiko Suzuki (鈴木 明子; born 1985), Japanese figure skater
- Akira Suzuki (chemist) (鈴木 章; born 1930), Japanese chemist and creator of the Suzuki reaction
- Akira Suzuki (director) (すずき あきら), Japanese animator
- Akira Suzuki (writer) (鈴木 明; 1929–2003), Japanese writer and journalist
- Ami Suzuki (鈴木 亜美; born 1982), Japanese singer, idol, DJ and actress
- Anju Suzuki (鈴木 杏樹; born 1969), also known as Kakko, Japanese actress, television presenter and singer
- Anne Suzuki (鈴木 杏; born 1987), Japanese actress
- Atsuto Suzuki (鈴木 厚人; born 1946), Japanese particle physicist
- Ayaka Suzuki (rugby union) (鈴木 彩香; born 1989), Japanese rugby sevens player
- Ayaki Suzuki (鈴木 彩貴; born 1987), Japanese footballer
- Ayuko Suzuki (鈴木 亜由子; born 1991), Japanese long-distance runner
- Bruno Suzuki (鈴木 ブルーノ; born 1990), Brazilian-born Japanese footballer
- Suzuki Bunji (鈴木 文治; 1885–1946), Japanese politician
- Chihiro Suzuki (鈴木 千尋; born 1977), Japanese voice actor and singer
- Chihiro Suzuki (ice hockey) (鈴木 千尋; born 2002), Japanese ice hockey player
- Chihiro Suzuki (fighter) (鈴木 千裕; born 1999), Japanese kickboxer and mixed martial artist
- Chikashi Suzuki (鈴木 隣; born 1959), Japanese footballer and manager
- Chinami Suzuki (鈴木 ちなみ; born 1989), Japanese model and actress
- Cutie Suzuki (キューティー鈴木; born 1969), Japanese professional wrestler
- D. T. Suzuki (鈴木 大拙 貞太; 1870–1966), Japanese Zen Buddhist scholar
- Daichi Suzuki (鈴木 大地; born 1967), Japanese swimmer
- Daichi Suzuki (baseball) (鈴木 大地; born 1989), Japanese baseball player
- Daiki Suzuki, Japanese-born American fashion designer
- Daikichi Suzuki (鈴木 大吉), Japanese rower
- Daisei Suzuki (鈴木 大誠; born 1996), Japanese footballer
- Daisuke Suzuki (actor) (鈴木 大介; born 1972), Japanese actor and voice actor
- Daisuke Suzuki (footballer) (鈴木 大輔; born 1990), Japanese footballer
- Daisuke Suzuki (musician) (鈴木 大輔; born 1978), Japanese musician
- Daisuke Suzuki (shogi) (鈴木 大介; born 1974), Japanese shogi player
- Damo Suzuki (ダモ 鈴木; 1950–2024), Japanese musician
- Daniele Suzuki (born 1977), Brazilian actress
- Dave Suzuki (born 1972), American musician
- David Suzuki (born 1936), Canadian science broadcaster and environmentalist
- Denmei Suzuki (鈴木 傳明; 1900–1985), Japanese actor
- Diane Suzuki (born 1966 – d. 1985), Hawaiian missing person
- Eikei Suzuki (鈴木 英敬; born 1974), Japanese politician
- Eitaro Suzuki (鈴木 英太郎), Japanese sport wrestler
- Emi Suzuki (鈴木 えみ; born 1985), Chinese-born Japanese fashion model and actress
- Emiko Suzuki (鈴木 絵美子; born 1981), Japanese synchronized swimmer
- Eri Suzuki (鈴木 絵理; born 1992), Japanese voice actress
- Fuku Suzuki (鈴木 福; born 2004), Japanese actor
- Fumihiro Suzuki (鈴木 郁洋; born 1975), Japanese baseball player and coach
- Fumika Suzuki (鈴木 史華; born 1974), Japanese voice actress, gravure idol and model
- Fusashige Suzuki (鈴木 房重; 1914–1945), Japanese long-distance runner
- Jack Soo (born Goro Suzuki; 1917–1979), American actor
- Haruna Suzuki (鈴木 春奈; born 1997), Japanese figure skater
- Suzuki Harunobu (鈴木 春信; c. 1725 – c. 1770), Japanese artist
- Hideki Suzuki (鈴木 秀樹; born 1980), Japanese professional wrestler
- Hidemi Suzuki (鈴木 秀美; born 1957), Japanese cellist
- Hideo Suzuki, multiple people
- Hideto Suzuki (鈴木 秀人; born 1974), Japanese footballer
- Hifumi Suzuki (鈴木 十二美; born 1957), Japanese Paralympic archer
- Hina Suzuki (鈴木 ヒナ), Japanese singer and HimeHina Virtual YouTuber duo
- Hiroaki Suzuki (鈴木 博昭; born 1984), Japanese shoot boxer
- Hiroki Suzuki (actor, born 1983) (鈴木 裕樹), Japanese actor
- Hiroki Suzuki (actor, born 1985) (鈴木 拡樹), Japanese actor and singer
- Hiroko Suzuki (鈴木 浩子; born 1974), Japanese wrestling manager and promoter
- Hiromi Suzuki (illustrator) (鈴木 博美), Japanese illustrator
- Hiromi Suzuki (runner) (鈴木 博美; born 1968), Japanese long-distance runner
- Hiromi Suzuki (volleyball) (鈴木 洋美; born 1978), Japanese volleyball player
- Hiroshi Suzuki (baseball) (鈴木 博志; born 1997), Japanese baseball player
- Hiroshi Suzuki (bobsledder) (鈴木 寛; born 1973), Japanese bobsledder
- Hiroshi Suzuki (diplomat) (鈴木浩; born 1961), Japanese ambassador to the United Kingdom
- Hiroshi Suzuki (swimmer) (鈴木 弘; born 1933), Japanese swimmer
- Hiroshi Suzuki (鈴木 寛; born 1966), better known as Papaya Suzuki, Japanese actor, dancer and television personality
- Hiroyuki Suzuki (yo-yo performer) (鈴木 裕之; born 1989), Japanese yo-yo performer
- Hiroyuki Suzuki (figure skater) (鈴木 弘幸; born 1959), Japanese figure skater, ice dancer and skating coach
- Hiroyuki Suzuki (architectural historian) (鈴木 博之; 1945–2014), Japanese architectural historian
- Hisatsugu Suzuki (鈴木 久嗣; born 1970), Japanese sprinter
- Honami Suzuki (鈴木 保奈美; born 1966), Japanese actress
- Ichiro Suzuki (鈴木 一朗; born 1973), Japanese former baseball player
- Ichiro Suzuki (engineer) (鈴木 一郎; born 1937), Japanese automotive engineer
- Ichiro Suzuki (footballer) (鈴木 一朗; born 1995), Japanese footballer
- Ikko Suzuki (鈴木一功; born 1952), Japanese actor
- Isao Suzuki (鈴木 勲; born 1933), Japanese jazz double-bassist
- Janet M. Suzuki (1943–1987), American librarian and activist
- Jirō Suzuki (鈴木 次郎), Japanese manga artist
- Julietta Suzuki (鈴木 ジュリエッタ), Japanese manga artist
- Jun Suzuki (footballer, born 1961) (鈴木 淳), Japanese footballer and manager
- Jun Suzuki (footballer, born 1989) (鈴木 惇), Japanese footballer
- Jun Suzuki (footballer, born 1993) (鈴木 潤), Japanese footballer
- Junji Suzuki (鈴木 淳司; born 1958), Japanese politician
- Junya Suzuki (footballer, born January 1996) (鈴木 準弥), Japanese footballer
- Junya Suzuki (footballer, born May 1996) (鈴木 順也), Japanese footballer
- Kaho Suzuki (鈴木 花歩; born 2002), Japanese ice hockey player
- Kaira Suzuki (鈴木 カイラ; born 2008), Japanese K-pop idol
- Kan Suzuki (鈴木 寛; born 1964), Japanese politician
- Kanna Suzuki (鈴木 環那; born 1987), Japanese shogi player
- Kanon Suzuki (鈴木 香音; born 1998), Japanese idol and singer
- Kantarō Suzuki (鈴木 貫太郎; 1868–1948), Imperial Japanese Navy admiral and Prime Minister of Japan
- Kasumi Suzuki (鈴木 かすみ; born 1990), Japanese actress
- Katsuhiro Suzuki (footballer) (鈴木 勝大; born 1977), Japanese footballer
- Katsuhiro Suzuki (actor) (鈴木 勝大; born 1992), Japanese actor and model
- Katsumasa Suzuki (鈴木 克昌; born 1943), Japanese politician
- Katsumi Suzuki (鈴木 勝美; born 1956), Japanese voice actor
- Kazuhiro Suzuki (鈴木 和裕; born 1976), Japanese footballer
- Kazuma Suzuki (鈴木 一真), Japanese actor, film director, fashion designer and model
- Keiichi Suzuki (鈴木 慶一; born 1951), Japanese musician and composer
- Keiichi Suzuki (governor of Hiroshima) (鈴木 敬一; 1889–1973), Japanese politician
- Keiichi Suzuki (racing driver) (鈴木恵一; born 1949), Japanese racing driver
- Keiichi Suzuki (speed skater) (鈴木 惠一; 1942–2025), Japanese speed skater
- Keiji Suzuki (鈴木 桂治; born 1980), Japanese judoka
- Keiko Suzuki (すずき けいこ), Japanese voice actress
- Keishi Suzuki (鈴木 啓示; born 1947), Japanese baseball player
- Keisuke Suzuki (鈴木 馨祐; born 1977), Japanese politician
- Keita Suzuki (footballer, born 1981) (鈴木 啓太; born 1981), Japanese footballer
- Keizo Suzuki (鈴木 圭三; 1927–1945), Japanese Go player
- Kenichi Suzuki (athlete) (鈴木 賢一; born 1967), Japanese long-distance runner
- Kenichi Suzuki (wrestler) (鈴木 賢一; born 1969), Japanese sport wrestler
- Kenji Suzuki (announcer) (鈴木 健二; born 1929), Japanese television announcer
- Kenji Suzuki (director) (鈴木 健二; born 1957), Japanese special effects director and actor
- Kenji Suzuki (footballer) (鈴木 健児; born 1986), Japanese footballer
- Kenji Suzuki (鈴木 健二; born 1950), better known as Damo Suzuki, Japanese musician
- Kenshiro Suzuki (鈴木 拳士郎; born 1996), Japanese footballer
- Kentaro Suzuki (鈴木 健太郎; born 1980), Japanese footballer
- Kenzo Suzuki (wrestler) (鈴木 健三; born 1974), Japanese professional wrestler
- Kenzo Suzuki (astronomer) (鈴木 憲蔵; born 1950), Japanese astronomer
- Suzuki Kiitsu (鈴木 其一; 1796–1858), Japanese painter
- Kimikazu Suzuki (鈴木 貴美一; born 1959), Japanese basketball player and coach
- Kimiko Suzuki (1929–1992), Japanese architect
- Suzuki Kisaburō (鈴木 喜三郎; 1867–1940), Japanese statesman and politician
- Kisaburō Suzuki (musician) (鈴木 キサブロー; born 1953), Japanese songwriter and guitarist
- Kiyonobu Suzuki (pilot) (鈴木 清延; 1914–1942), Japanese World War II flying ace
- Kiyonobu Suzuki (voice actor) (鈴木 清信; born 1950), Japanese voice actor
- Kiyoshi Suzuki (鈴木 清; 1943–2000), Japanese photographer
- Kiyotaka Suzuki (鈴木清崇; born 1979), Japanese director
- Koji Suzuki (鈴木 光司; 1957–2026), Japanese writer
- Koji Suzuki (footballer) (鈴木 孝司; born 1989), Japanese footballer
- Konomi Suzuki (鈴木 このみ; born 1996), Japanese singer
- Kosuke Suzuki (鈴木 浩介; born 1974), Japanese actor
- Kotaro Suzuki (鈴木 鼓太郎; born 1978), Japanese professional wrestler
- Kunio Suzuki (鈴木 國央; born 1976), Japanese sailor
- Kunitomo Suzuki (鈴木 国友; born 1995), Japanese footballer
- Kurt Suzuki (born 1983), American baseball player
- Kyōka Suzuki (鈴木 京香; born 1968), Japanese actress
- Mac Suzuki (マック鈴木; born 1975), Japanese baseball player
- Suzuki Magoichi (鈴木 孫一; c. 1534 – c. 1589) (aka Magoichi Saika), leader of the Saika Ikki mercenaries
- Suzuki Magoroku (鈴木 孫六) (aka Magoroku Saika), brother of Suzuki Magoichi
- Manabu Suzuki (鈴木 学; born 1963), Japanese racing driver, journalist and sports announcer
- Manabu Suzuki (biathlete) (鈴木 学; born 1946), Japanese biathlete
- Mariko Suzuki (鈴木 麻里子; born 1967), Japanese voice actress
- Mariya Suzuki (鈴木 まりや; born 1991), Japanese idol, singer and actress
- Masaaki Suzuki (鈴木 雅明; born 1954), Japanese organist, harpsichordist and conductor
- Masae Suzuki (鈴木 政江; born 1957), Japanese women's footballer and manager
- Masaharu Suzuki (鈴木 正治; born 1970), Japanese footballer
- Masahiko Suzuki (鈴木 真彦; born 1997), Japanese kickboxer
- Suzuki Masahisa (鈴木 正久; 1912–1969), Japanese Methodist pastor
- Masahito Suzuki (footballer) (鈴木 正人; born 1977), Japanese footballer
- Masahito Suzuki (ice hockey) (鈴木 雅仁; born 1983), Japanese ice hockey player
- Masakazu Suzuki (鈴木 政一; born 1955), Japanese footballer and manager
- Masaki Suzuki (鈴木 正樹; born 1945), Japanese speed skater
- Masami Suzuki (鈴木 真仁; born 1972), Japanese voice actress and singer
- Masanori Suzuki (鈴木 将方; born 1968), Japanese footballer
- Masato Suzuki (鈴木 マサト), Japanese mixed martial artist
- Masatsugu Suzuki, Japanese-American physicist
- Masaya Suzuki (鈴木 将也; born 1988), Japanese footballer
- Masayuki Suzuki (鈴木 雅之; born 1956), Japanese singer
- Masayuki Suzuki (drummer) (鈴木 政行; born 1972), Japanese drummer
- Mayumi Suzuki (すずき まゆみ; born 1970), Japanese voice actress
- Michio Suzuki (inventor) (鈴木 道雄; 1887–1982), Japanese businessman, inventor and founder of the Suzuki Motor Corporation
- Michio Suzuki (mathematician) (鈴木 通夫; 1926–1998), Japanese mathematician
- Midori Suzuki (artist) (born 1947), Japanese artist living and working in Mexico
- Midori Suzuki (educator) (鈴木 みどり; 1941–2006), Japanese educator
- Midori Suzuki (soprano) (鈴木 美登里), Japanese soprano
- Mie Suzuki (鈴木 三枝; born 1958), better known as Teiyū Ichiryūsai, Japanese voice actress
- Miekichi Suzuki (鈴木 三重吉; 1882–1936), Japanese writer
- Mikuru Suzuki (鈴木 未来; born 1982), Japanese darts player
- Minori Suzuki (鈴木 みのり; born 1997), Japanese voice actress
- Minoru Suzuki (鈴木 実; born 1968), Japanese professional wrestler and mixed martial artist
- Minoru Suzuki (Home ministry government official) (鈴木 登; 1893–?), Japanese politician
- Mitsuhiro Suzuki (鈴木 光広; born 1963), Japanese cyclist
- Mitsuto Suzuki (鈴木 光人; born 1973), Japanese composer
- Mizuho Suzuki (鈴木 瑞穂; born 1927), Japanese actor and voice actor
- Monta Suzuki (鈴木 聞多; 1913–1939), Japanese sprinter
- Mosaburō Suzuki (鈴木 茂三郎; 1893–1970), Japanese socialist, journalist and writer
- Suzuki Motonobu (鈴木 元信; 1555–1620), Japanese samurai
- Muneo Suzuki (鈴木 宗男; born 1948), Japanese politician
- Musashi Suzuki (鈴木 武蔵; born 1994), Japanese footballer
- Nakaba Suzuki (鈴木 央; born 1977), Japanese manga artist
- Nao Suzuki (鈴木 奈央; born 1997), Japanese cyclist
- Naomichi Suzuki (鈴木 直道; born 1981), Japanese politician
- Nick Suzuki (born 1999), Canadian hockey player
- Nobutaka Suzuki (鈴木 伸貴; born 1983), Japanese footballer
- Nobutatsu Suzuki (鈴木 信達; born 1977), Japanese mixed martial artist
- Nobuyuki Suzuki (鈴木 伸之; born 1992), Japanese actor
- Nobuyuki Suzuki (actor, born 1963) (鈴木 伸之; born 1963), Japanese actor
- Norifumi Suzuki (鈴木 則文; 1933–2014), Japanese film director and screenwriter
- Norio Suzuki (explorer) (鈴木 紀夫; 1949–1986), Japanese explorer
- Norio Suzuki (footballer) (鈴木 規郎; born 1984), Japanese footballer
- Norio Suzuki (golfer) (鈴木 規夫; born 1951), Japanese golfer
- Osamu Suzuki (businessman) (鈴木 修; 1930–2024), Japanese businessman
- Osamu Suzuki (ceramist) (鈴木 藏; 1926–2001), Japanese ceramist
- Osamu Suzuki (screenwriter) (鈴木 おさむ; born 1972), Japanese television writer and screenwriter
- Papaya Suzuki (パパイヤ 鈴木; born 1966), Japanese dancer, choreographer, and actor
- Pat Suzuki (born 1930), American singer and actress
- Rafael Suzuki (born 1987), Brazilian racing driver
- Raita Suzuki (鈴木 雷太; born 1972), Japanese cyclist
- Ranran Suzuki (鈴木 蘭々; born 1975), Japanese actress and singer
- Reiji Suzuki (鈴木 礼治; born 1928), Japanese politician
- Reiko Suzuki (鈴木 れい子; born 1944), Japanese voice actress
- Reiko Suzuki (Scouting) (鈴木 れい子)
- Rina Suzuki (musician) (鈴木 理菜; born 1991), Japanese musician and singer-songwriter
- Rio Suzuki (鈴木 梨央; born 2005), Japanese actress
- Russell Suzuki, American lawyer and Attorney General of Hawaii
- Ryan Suzuki (born 2001), Canadian ice hockey player
- Ryohei Suzuki (鈴木 亮平; born 1983), Japanese actor
- Ryohei Suzuki (footballer) (鈴木 良平; born 1949), Japanese footballer and manager
- Ryoko Suzuki (born 1970), Japanese artist
- Ryota Suzuki (footballer) (鈴木 椋大; born 1994), Japanese footballer
- Ryōta Suzuki (voice actor) (鈴木 崚汰; born 1998), Japanese voice actor
- Ryozo Suzuki (鈴木 良三; born 1939), Japanese footballer
- Ryuga Suzuki (鈴木 隆雅; born 1994), Japanese footballer
- Sachiko Suzuki (鈴木 早智子; born 1969), Japanese singer, talent, actress and Wink member
- Sakari Suzuki (1899–1995), Japanese-born American artist
- Saori Suzuki (鈴木 沙織; born 1990), Japanese freestyle skier
- Sarina Suzuki (鈴木 紗理奈; born 1977), Japanese actress, gravure idol, singer and television personality
- Satomi Suzuki (鈴木 聡美; born 1991), Japanese swimmer
- Satoru Suzuki (鈴木 悟; born 1975), Japanese footballer
- Satoshi Suzuki (鈴木 智), Japanese screenwriter
- Sawa Suzuki (鈴木 砂羽; born 1972), Japanese actress
- Seiichi Suzuki (figure skater) (鈴木 誠一; born 1976), Japanese figure skater
- Seiichi Suzuki (philologist) (born 1956), Japanese philologist
- Seiji Suzuki (鈴木 政二; born 1948), Japanese politician
- Seijun Suzuki (鈴木 清順; 1923–2017), Japanese film director
- Seiya Suzuki (鈴木 誠也; born 1994), Japanese baseball player
- Seizo Suzuki (鈴木 省三; 1913–2000), Japanese rose breeder
- Sena Suzuki (鈴木 世奈; born 1991), Japanese ice hockey player
- Senichi Suzuki, Japanese engineer
- Sergio Suzuki (鈴木 セルヒオ; born 1994), Japanese taekwondo practitioner
- Shigeharu Suzuki (鈴木 重晴; 1934–2012), Japanese sprinter
- Suzuki Shigehide (鈴木 重秀; 1546 - after 1586), Japanese samurai
- Suzuki Shigeoki (鈴木 重意; 1511–1585), Japanese samurai
- Shigeru Suzuki (鈴木 茂; born 1951), Japanese musician
- Shigeyasu Suzuki (鈴木 重康; 1886–1957), Japanese general
- Shigeyoshi Suzuki (鈴木 重義; 1902–1971), Japanese footballer
- Shigeyoshi Suzuki (film director) (鈴木 重吉; 1900–1976), Japanese film director and screenwriter
- Shinetsu Suzuki (鈴木 進悦; born 1939), Japanese boxer
- Shingo Suzuki (footballer) (鈴木 慎吾; born 1978), Japanese footballer
- Shingo Suzuki (mixed martial artist) (鈴木 槙吾; born 1986), Japanese mixed martial artist and professional wrestler
- Shinichi Suzuki (鈴木 鎮一; 1898–1998), Japanese classical violinist and creator of the "Suzuki method"
- Suzuki Shin'ichi I (鈴木 真一; 1835–1918), Japanese photographer
- Suzuki Shin'ichi II (鈴木 真一; 1855–1912), Japanese photographer
- Shinichiro Suzuki (鈴木 信一朗; born 1934), Japanese boxer
- Shinri Suzuki (鈴木 真理; born 1974), Japanese cyclist
- Shintarō Suzuki (鈴木 信太郎; 1884–1958), Japanese politician
- Shiro Suzuki (鈴木 史朗; born 1938), Japanese announcer and television personality
- Shōgo Suzuki (actor, born 1963) (鈴木 省吾), Japanese actor, voice actor and narrator
- Shogo Suzuki (actor, born 1989) (鈴木 勝吾), Japanese actor and musician
- Shōhei Suzuki (鈴木 正平), Japanese astronomer
- Shoji Suzuki (鈴木 章治; 1932–1995), Japanese jazz clarinetist and bandleader
- Suzuki Shōsan (鈴木 正三; 1579–1655), Japanese samurai
- Shosuke Suzuki (鈴木 章介; born 1936), Japanese decathlete
- Shōta Suzuki (baseball, born 1995) (鈴木 翔太), Japanese baseball player
- Shota Suzuki (footballer, born 1984) (鈴木 将太), Japanese footballer
- Shota Suzuki (footballer, born 1996) (鈴木 翔太), Japanese footballer
- Shoto Suzuki (鈴木 翔登; born 1992), Japanese footballer
- Shunichi Suzuki (governor) (鈴木 俊一; 1910–2010), Japanese politician and bureaucrat
- Shun'ichi Suzuki (politician) (鈴木 俊一; born 1953), Japanese politician
- Shunryū Suzuki (鈴木 俊隆; 1904–1971), Japanese Zen Buddhist master
- Shuto Suzuki (鈴木 修人; born 1985), Japanese footballer
- Sōsaku Suzuki (鈴木 宗作; 1891–1945), Japanese general
- Sujaku Suzuki (鈴木 朱雀; 1891–1972), Japanese artist
- Suzumi Suzuki (鈴木涼美; born 1983), Japanese writer
- Tadashi Suzuki (鈴木 忠志; born 1939), Japanese theatre director, writer and philosopher
- Takaaki Suzuki (鈴木 孝明; born 1981), Japanese footballer
- Takafumi Suzuki (鈴木 崇文; born 1987), Japanese footballer
- Takahiro Suzuki (鈴木 尚広; born 1978), Japanese baseball player
- Takahito Suzuki (鈴木 貴人; born 1975), Japanese ice hockey player
- Takako Suzuki (鈴木 貴子; born 1986), Japanese politician
- Takanori Suzuki (鈴木 尚典; born 1972), Japanese baseball player
- Takao Suzuki (鈴木 貴男; born 1976), Japanese tennis player
- Takao Suzuki (sociolinguist) (鈴木 孝夫; born 1926), Japanese sociolinguist
- Takashi Suzuki (government official) (鈴木 隆史; born 1941), Japanese government official
- Takashi Suzuki (politician) (鈴木 隆; 1882–1978), Japanese stock trader and politician
- Takayuki Suzuki (鈴木 隆行; born 1976), Japanese footballer
- Takayuki Suzuki (footballer, born 1973) (鈴木 敬之), Japanese footballer
- Takayuki Suzuki (swimmer) (鈴木 孝幸), Japanese Paralympic swimmer
- Takehito Suzuki (鈴木 健仁; born 1971), Japanese footballer
- Takekazu Suzuki (鈴木 武一; born 1956), Japanese footballer and manager
- Takeshi Suzuki (academic) (鈴木 斌; 1932–2005), Japanese professor of Urdu
- Takeshi Suzuki (alpine skier) (鈴木 猛史; born 1988), Japanese Paralympic alpine skier
- Taku Suzuki (鈴木 拓; born 1975), Japanese comedian and actor
- Takuma Suzuki (鈴木 琢磨; born 1961), Japanese voice actor
- Tamejiro Suzuki (鈴木 為次郎; 1883–1960), Japanese Go player
- Tamotsu Suzuki (鈴木 保; 1947–2025), Japanese football player and manager
- Tatsuhisa Suzuki (鈴木 達央; born 1983), Japanese actor, voice actor and singer
- Tatsuki Suzuki (鈴木 竜生; born 1997), Japanese motorcycle racer
- Tatsuo Suzuki (cinematographer) (鈴木 達夫; born 1935), Japanese cinematographer
- Tatsuo Suzuki (martial artist) (鈴木 達夫; 1928–2011), Japanese karateka
- Tatsuya Suzuki (footballer, born 1982) (鈴木 達也), Japanese footballer
- Tatsuya Suzuki (footballer, born 1993) (鈴木 達也), Japanese footballer
- Teiichi Suzuki (鈴木 貞一; 1888–1989), Imperial Japanese Army general and economist
- Teruaki Suzuki (鈴木 輝昭; born 1958), Japanese classical composer
- Toby Suzuki, Bronze Wolf recipient
- Toichi Suzuki (鈴木 冬一; born 2000), Japanese footballer
- Tokuma Suzuki (鈴木 徳真; born 1997), Japanese footballer
- Tomiko Suzuki (鈴木 富子; 1956–2003), Japanese voice actress
- Tomoki Suzuki (鈴木 智樹; born 1985), Japanese footballer
- Tomoko Suzuki (鈴木 智子; born 1982), Japanese women's footballer
- Tomoyuki Suzuki (鈴木 智幸; born 1985), Japanese footballer
- Toru Suzuki (鈴木 亨; born 1966), Japanese golfer
- Toshifumi Suzuki (鈴木 敏文; 1932–2026), Japanese chief executive
- Toshio Suzuki (producer) (鈴木 敏夫; born 1948), Japanese film producer
- Toshio Suzuki (racing driver) (鈴木 利男; born 1955), Japanese racing driver
- Tsugumichi Suzuki (鈴木 従道; born 1945), Japanese-long-distance runner
- Tsuneo Suzuki (鈴木 恒夫; born 1941), Japanese politician
- Udo Suzuki (ウド 鈴木; born 1970), Japanese musician and comedian
- Umetaro Suzuki (鈴木 梅太; 1874–1943), Japanese scientist
- Wakaba Suzuki (鈴木 若葉; born 1970), Japanese judoka
- Wendy Suzuki, American neuroscientist and writer
- Yasuhiro Suzuki (鈴木 康弘; born 1984), Japanese boxer
- Yasuhito Suzuki (鈴木 康仁; born 1959), Japanese footballer
- Yasunori Suzuki (鈴木康範; 1969–2019), Japanese serial killer
- Yasuo Suzuki (鈴木 保男), Japanese footballer
- Yasushi Suzuki (鈴木 靖; born 1962), Japanese speed skater
- Yasutomo Suzuki (鈴木 康友; born 1957), Japanese politician
- Yoetsu Suzuki (鈴木 陽悦; born 1949), Japanese politician
- Yohei Suzuki (鈴木 洋平; born 1973), Japanese mixed martial artist
- Yōichirō Suzuki (鈴木 洋一郎; born 1952), Japanese particle physicist
- Yone Suzuki (鈴木 よね; 1852–1938), Japanese businesswoman
- Yoshifumi Suzuki (鈴木 寛史; born 1983), Japanese volleyball player
- Yoshihiro Suzuki (鈴木 義広; born 1983), Japanese baseball player
- Yoshikazu Suzuki (鈴木 良和; born 1982), Japanese footballer
- Yoshinori Suzuki (鈴木 義宜; born 1992), Japanese footballer
- Yoshitake Suzuki (鈴木 喜丈; born 1998), Japanese footballer
- Yoshiteru Suzuki (鈴木 善照; born 1909), Japanese rower
- Yu Suzuki (鈴木 裕; born 1958), Japanese video game designer and producer
- Yuki Suzuki (鈴木 祐貴; born 1997), Japanese volleyball player
- Yukinori Suzuki (鈴木 裕紀; born 1977), Japanese basketball player and coach
- Yuko Suzuki (鈴木 裕子; born 1989), Japanese volleyball player
- Yuma Suzuki (鈴木 優磨; born 1996), Japanese footballer
- Yumi Suzuki (鈴木 夕湖; born 1991), Japanese curler
- Yumiko Suzuki (canoeist) (鈴木 祐美子; born 1976), Japanese sprint canoeist
- Yumiko Suzuki (cyclist) (鈴木 裕美子; born 1960), Japanese cyclist
- Yuri Suzuki (physicist), American physicist
- Yusuke Suzuki (racewalker) (鈴木 雄介; born 1988), Japanese racewalker
- Yuto Suzuki (鈴木 雄斗; born 1993), Japanese footballer
- Yūto Suzuki (鈴木裕斗, born 1989), Japanese voice actor
- Yuuna Suzuki (鈴木 友菜; born 1992), Japanese model and actress
- Zenkō Suzuki (鈴木 善幸; 1911–2004), Japanese politician and Prime Minister of Japan
- Zion Suzuki (鈴木 彩艶, born 2002), Japanese footballer

== Fictional characters ==
- Suzuki (YuYu Hakusho) (鈴木), a character in the manga series Yu Yu Hakusho
- Suzuki, a character in the manga series Ichi the Killer
- Suzuki, the lady's maid in Puccini's opera Madama Butterfly
- Akira Suzuki (鈴木 明神), a character in the story "Taisho Adventures" in the mobile game "Dress Up! Time Princess"
- Arimi Suzuki (鈴木 亜梨実), a character in the manga series Marmalade Boy
- Erika Suzuki (鈴木 エリカ), a character in the anime series Sakura Quest
- Ichirō Suzuki (鈴木 一郎), protagonist of the light novel series Death March to the Parallel World Rhapsody
- Ikumi Suzuki (鈴木 いくみ), a character in the light novel series Jinsei
- Iruma Suzuki (鈴木 入間), protagonist of the manga series Welcome to Demon School! Iruma-kun
- Jirokichi Suzuki (鈴木 次郎吉), a character in the manga series Case Closed
- Jun Suzuki (鈴木 純), a character in the manga series K-On!
- Kana Suzuki (鈴木 佳奈), a character in the visual novel A Good Librarian Like a Good Shepherd
- Kazuki Suzuki (錫木 カズキ), a character in the video game Scared Rider Xechs
- Kissy Suzuki, a Bond girl
- Makoto Suzuki, a character in Tokyo Revengers
- Mako Suzuki (須々木 マコ) (Maggey Byrde), a character in the video game Phoenix Wright: Ace Attorney − Justice for All
- Mika Suzuki (鈴木 みか), a character in the manga series Doki Doki School Hours
- Momoka Suzuki (鈴木 桃香), a character in the manga series High School Girls
- Miyu Suzuki (鈴木 みゆ), a character in the manga series You and I Are Polar Opposites
- Nagisa Suzuki (鈴木 なぎさ), a character in the anime series Two Car
- Right Suzuki (鈴樹 来斗), a character in the television series Ressha Sentai ToQger
- Rin Suzuki (鈴木 凛), a character in the manga series Bamboo Blade
- Rizumu Suzuki (鈴木 理詰夢), a character in the anime series Gatchaman Crowds
- Sayaka Suzuki (鈴木 さやか), a character in the manga series Pani Poni Dash
- Shou Suzuki (鈴木 将) and Touichirou Suzuki (鈴木 統一郎), characters in the manga series Mob Psycho 100
- Sonoko Suzuki (鈴木 園子) (Serena Sebastian), a character in the manga series Case Closed
- Taichi Suzuki (鈴木 太一), an alias used byYakuza protagonist Kazuma Kiryu
- Takako Suzuki (鈴木 貴子), a character in the anime series Girls und Panzer
- Yoko Suzuki, a character in the video game Resident Evil Outbreak
- Yoshikazu Suzuki (鈴木 良一), a character in the manga series Gantz
- Yua Suzuki (鈴木 結愛), a character in the anime series Tesagure! Bukatsu-mono
- Yuma Suzuki (鈴木 由真), a character in the manga series High School Girls
- Yuri Suzuki (鈴木 夕梨), protagonist of the manga series Red River

== See also ==
- Satō–Suzuki Baseball Match
