= Satō =

- Language: Japanese

Origin
- Region of origin: Japan

Satō (Japanese: さとう; 佐藤, pronounced [saꜜtoː], English: /ˈsɑːtoʊ/ SAH-toh) is the most common Japanese surname with 2 million people having the surname, representing about 1.5% of Japan's population in March 2023. It is often romanized as Sato, Satou or Satoh.

A 2024 study by Hiroshi Yoshida at Tohoku University estimated that if a law requiring spouses to have the same surname is not repealed and the Japanese people do not go extinct due to population decline, then every person in Japan will have the surname Satō by c. 2531 — legalizing separate surnames for married couples would delay this to c. 3310.

== Origin ==
The origin of the name Satō dates back to Fujiwara clan. It is believed that the surname originated in Sano, Tochigi where Fujiwara no Hidesato (藤原秀郷), a military commander from the Heian period, and was the governor of Sano Province, whose descendants combined the kanji character for "Sa" (佐) from Sano (佐野) and the "tō" (藤) from Fujiwara (藤原), which means "Fujiwara of Sano".

== Satō Day ==
Satō Day (佐藤の日, Satō no Hi) is an annual event held in Sano, Tochigi, every March 10. Where the city offers discounts and calls itself the "Holy land of Satō". The city also created the Satō Association (佐藤の会). And in 2025, in partnership with Kainan, Wakayama, the birthplace of the name Suzuki (the second most common surname in Japan), a baseball match was held between people with the surname Suzuki and Satō in Ajec Sano Baseball Stadium.

== Notable people ==
- Ai Satō (さとう あい; born 1955), Japanese actress and voice actress
- Aiko Sato (actress) (佐藤 藍子; born 1977), Japanese actress
- Aiko Sato (judoka) (佐藤 愛子; born 1983), Japanese judoka
- Aiko Satō (writer) (佐藤 愛子; 1923–2026), Japanese writer
- Aimaro Satō (佐藤 愛麿; 1857–1934), Japanese diplomat
- Akemi Satō (singer) (佐藤 朱美; born 1972), Japanese singer
- Akemi Satō (voice actress) (佐藤 朱; born 1980), Japanese voice actress
- Akihiro Sato (footballer, born August 1986) (佐藤 昭大), Japanese footballer
- Akihiro Sato (footballer, born October 1986) (佐藤 晃大), Japanese footballer
- Akihiro Sato (model), Brazilian model
- Akiko Sato (佐藤 明子; born 1984), Japanese sport shooter
- Akio Sato (politician, born 1927) (佐藤 昭夫; 1927–2007), Japanese politician
- Akio Sato (politician, born 1943) (佐藤 昭郎), Japanese politician
- Akio Sato (wrestler) (佐藤 昭雄; born 1953), Japanese professional wrestler
- Akira Satō (photographer) (佐藤 明; 1930–2002), Japanese photographer
- Akira Satō (ski jumper) (佐藤 晃; born 1964), Japanese ski jumper
- Amahiko Satō (佐藤 天彦; born 1988), Japanese shogi player
- Amina Sato (佐藤 亜美菜; born 1990), Japanese idol, singer, actress and voice actress
- Arisa Satō (佐藤 あり紗; born 1989), Japanese volleyball player
- Arisa Sato (model) (佐藤 ありさ; born 1988), Japanese model and weathercaster
- Ayano Sato (canoeist) (佐藤 彩乃; born 1996), Japanese slalom canoeist
- Ayano Sato (singer) (佐藤 綾乃; born 1995), Japanese idol and singer
- Ayano Sato (speed skater) (佐藤 綾乃; born 1996), Japanese speed skater
- Ayumi Sato (佐藤 あゆみ; born 1977), Japanese ice hockey player
- Chiaki Satō (佐藤 千亜妃; born 1988), Japanese actress and musician
- Chica Sato (佐藤 チカ), Japanese musician
- Chie Satō (佐藤 智恵; born 1964), Japanese voice actress
- Chiyako Sato (佐藤 千夜子; 1897–1968), Japanese singer
- Choei Sato (佐藤 長栄; born 1951), Japanese footballer
- Churyo Sato (佐藤 忠良; 1912–2011), Japanese sculptor
- Dai Satō (佐藤 大; born 1969), Japanese screenwriter and musician
- Dai Sato (footballer) (佐藤 大; born 1971), Japanese footballer
- Daihachiro Sato (佐藤 大八郎; 1932–2008), Japanese mathematician
- Daiki Sato (footballer, born 1999) (佐藤 大樹; born 1999), Japanese footballer
- Daisuke Satō (佐藤 大輔; 1964–2017), Japanese board game designer, novelist and manga writer
- Daisuke Sato (footballer) (佐藤 大介; born 1994), Filipino footballer
- Eiichi Sato (佐藤 栄一; born 1961), Japanese mayor
- Eiji Sato (佐藤 英二; born 1971), Japanese footballer
- Eiken Sato (佐藤 英賢; born 1986), Japanese equestrian
- Eisaku Satō (佐藤 榮作; 1901–1975), Japanese politician and Prime Minister of Japan
- Eisaku Satō (governor) (佐藤 栄佐久; 1939–2025), Japanese politician
- Eleanor Sato, American politician
- Emiko Sato (佐藤 恵美子; born 1971), Japanese cross-country skier
- Eric Sato (born 1966), American volleyball player
- Eriko Sato (佐藤 江梨子; born 1981), Japanese actress
- Eriko Sato (footballer) (佐藤 衣里子; born 1985), Japanese women's footballer
- Eunice Sato (1921–2021), American politician
- Fumiya Satō (さとう ふみや; born 1965), Japanese manga artist
- Garret T. Sato (1964–2020), American actor
- Gen Satō (佐藤 元; born 1997), Japanese voice actor
- Ginpei Sato (佐藤 銀平; born 1977), Japanese voice actor
- G. G. Sato (佐藤 隆彦; born 1978), Japanese baseball player
- Gordon H. Sato (1927–2017), American cell biologist and environmentalist
- Hachiro Sato (佐藤 八郎), Japanese rower
- Harue Sato (佐藤 春詠; born 1976), Japanese footballer
- Haruhiko Sato (佐藤 陽彦; born 1978), Japanese footballer
- Haruo Satō (novelist) (佐藤 春夫; 1892–1964), Japanese novelist
- Haruo Satō (voice actor) (佐藤 晴男; born 1961), Japanese voice actor
- Haruo Sato (water polo) (佐藤 晴雄; born 1945), Japanese water polo player
- Hidetoshi Sato (佐藤 英利; born 1950), Japanese luger
- Hikaru Sato (佐藤 弘明; born 1980), Japanese professional wrestler and mixed martial artist
- Hinata Satō (佐藤 日向; born 1998), Japanese actress and voice actress
- Hiroaki Sato (figure skater) (佐藤 洸彬; born 1995), Japanese figure skater
- Hiroaki Sato (footballer) (佐藤 弘明; 1932–1988), Japanese footballer
- Hiroaki Sato (translator) (佐藤 紘彰; born 1942), Japanese poet and translator
- Hiroji Satoh (佐藤 博治; 1925–2000), Japanese tennis player
- Hiroki Sato (佐藤 博紀; born 1982), Japanese basketball player and executive
- Hiroko Sato (佐藤 寛子; born 1985), Japanese actress, singer and gravure idol
- Hiroko Sato (athlete) (佐藤 弘子; born 1939), Japanese javelin thrower
- Hiromi Satō (佐藤 ひろ美; born 1970), Japanese singer-songwriter
- Hiroshi Sato (musician) (佐藤 博; 1947–2012), Japanese singer-songwriter
- Hiroshi Sato (curler) (佐藤 浩; born 1978), Japanese curler and curling coach
- Hirotaka Sato (佐藤 浩貴; born 1981), Japanese basketball player
- Hiroya Sato (佐藤 寛弥; born 1976), Japanese rower
- Hisaharu Satoh, Japanese bowls player
- Hisato Satō (佐藤 寿人; born 1982), Japanese footballer
- Hisayasu Satō (佐藤 寿保; born 1959), Japanese film director
- Hisayoshi Sato (佐藤 久佳; born 1987), Japanese swimmer
- Hitomi Satō (actress) (佐藤 仁美; born 1979), Japanese actress
- Hitomi Sato (table tennis) (佐藤 瞳; born 1997), Japanese table tennis player
- Hitoshi Sato (佐藤 仁; born 1962), Japanese cyclist
- Ichiko Sato (佐藤 伊知子; born 1965), Japanese volleyball player
- Isao Sato (actor) (佐藤 勇夫; 1949–1990), Japanese actor
- Isao Satō (astronomer) (佐藤 勇夫; born 1963), Japanese astronomer
- Satō Issai (佐藤 一斎; 1772–1859), Japanese Confucianist
- Itsuki Sato (佐藤 樹; born 2002), Japanese racing driver
- Jackie Sato (ジャッキー 佐藤; 1957–1999), Japanese professional wrestler
- Jin Sato (footballer) (佐藤 尽; born 1974), Japanese footballer
- Jiro Sato (佐藤 次郎; 1908–1934), Japanese tennis player
- Jiro Sato (actor) (佐藤 二朗; born 1969), Japanese actor, screenwriter and film director
- Josephine Sato (born 1954), Filipino politician
- Junichi Sato (佐藤 順一; born 1960), Japanese anime director
- Junpei Satoh (佐藤 淳平; born 1956), Japanese painter
- Junya Satō (佐藤 純彌; 1932–2019), Japanese film director
- Kai Sato (born 1984), American chief operating officer
- Kanta Sato (佐藤 寛太; born 1996), Japanese actor
- Katsuaki Satō (佐藤 勝昭; born 1946), Japanese karateka
- Katsuhiko Sato (佐藤 勝彦; born 1943), Japanese cyclist
- Katsumi Satō (佐藤 勝巳; 1929–2013), Japanese activist, editor and critic
- Katsura Sato (佐藤 桂; born 1989), Japanese biathlete
- Kayo Satoh (佐藤 かよ; born 1988), Japanese model and television personality
- Kazuhiro Sato (佐藤 和弘; born 1990), Japanese footballer
- Kazuhiro Sato (speed skater) (佐藤 和弘; born 1967), Japanese speed skater
- Kazuki Sato (footballer, born 1974) (佐藤 一樹), Japanese footballer
- Kazuki Sato (footballer, born 1993) (佐藤 和樹), Japanese footballer
- Kazuo Sato (skier) (佐藤 和男; born 1937), Japanese cross-country skier
- Kazuo Sato (weightlifter) (佐藤 和夫; born 1970), Japanese weightlifter
- Kazutoshi Satō (佐藤 和俊; born 1978), Japanese shogi player
- Kei Satō (佐藤 慶; 1928–2010), Japanese actor
- Keiichi Sato (さとう けいいち), Japanese mecha and character designer
- Keita Satoh (curler) (佐藤 恵大), Japanese curler
- Kenji Sato (baseball) (佐藤 賢治; born 1988), Japanese baseball player
- Kenji Sato (basketball) (佐藤 賢次; born 1979), Japanese basketball player and coach
- Kenki Sato (佐藤 賢希; born 1984), Japanese equestrian
- Kennosuke Sato (佐藤 剣之助; 1891–1967), Japanese journalist
- Kensuke Sato (佐藤 謙介; born 1989), Japanese footballer
- Kentaro Sato (佐藤 賢太郎; born 1981), Japanese composer and conductor
- Kentaro Sato (footballer) (佐藤 健太郎; born 1984), Japanese footballer
- Kimi Sato (born 1949), Japanese composer
- Kimiko Sato (佐藤 公子; born 1946), Japanese swimmer
- Kimiya Sato (佐藤 公哉; born 1989), Japanese racing driver
- Kiyomi Sato (佐藤 清美; born 1962), Japanese basketball coach
- Kodai Sato (佐藤 幸大; born 1985), Japanese footballer
- Kohei Sato (佐藤 耕平; born 1977), Japanese professional wrestler
- Kōichi Satō (actor) (佐藤 浩市; born 1960), Japanese actor
- Koichi Sato (biathlete) (佐藤 幸一; born 1956), Japanese biathlete
- Koichi Sato (footballer) (佐藤 洸一; born 1986), Japanese footballer
- Koichi Sato (philatelist) (佐藤 浩一), Japanese philatelist
- Koichi Sato (ski jumper) (佐藤 耕一; born 1931), Japanese ski jumper
- Kōji Satō (photographer) (佐藤 虹児; 1911–1955), Japanese photographer
- Koji Sato (politician) (佐藤 公治; born 1959), Japanese politician
- Kosuke Sato (佐藤 好助; born 1942), Japanese swimmer
- Kōtoku Satō (佐藤 幸徳; 1893–1959), Japanese general
- Koyo Sato (佐藤 昂洋; born 1996), Japanese footballer
- Kōzō Satō (佐藤 皐蔵; 1871–1948), Imperial Japanese Navy admiral
- Kumiko Sato (佐藤 久美子; born 1946), Japanese figure skater and coach
- Kyoko Sato (佐藤 京子), Japanese Paralympic athlete
- Liane Sato (born 1964), American volleyball player
- Mai Sato (佐藤 舞), Japanese UN Special Rapporteur and academic
- Maiko Sato (佐藤 麻衣子; born 1978), Japanese sailor
- Makoto Satō (actor) (佐藤 允; 1934–2012), Japanese actor
- Makoto Satō (director) (佐藤 真; 1957–2007), Japanese film director
- Makoto Satō (theatre) (佐藤 信; born 1943), Japanese theatre director
- Mamoru Sato (born 1937), American modernist sculptor
- Marino Sato (佐藤 万璃音; born 1999), Japanese racing driver
- Masaharu Satō (佐藤 正治; born 1946), Japanese voice actor and narrator
- Masahiko Satoh (佐藤 允彦; born 1941), Japanese jazz pianist, composer and arranger
- Masahiro Sato (佐藤 真弘; born 1936), Japanese ice hockey player
- Masahisa Sato (佐藤 正久; born 1960), Japanese politician
- Masaki Sato (佐藤 優樹; born 1999), Japanese singer and former idol
- Masako Sato (field hockey) (佐藤 雅子; born 1987), Japanese field hockey player
- Masako Sato (ice hockey) (佐藤 雅子; born 1973), Japanese ice hockey player
- Masami Sato (佐藤 正美; born 1981), Japanese footballer
- Masaru Sato (佐藤 勝; 1928–1999), Japanese film score composer
- Masatake Sato (佐藤 昌丈; born 1991), Japanese footballer
- Masaya Sato (footballer, born 1990) (佐藤 将也), Japanese footballer
- Megumi Sato (actress) (佐藤 めぐみ; born 1984), Japanese actress and television personality
- Megumi Sato (athlete) (佐藤 恵; born 1966), Japanese high jumper
- Michihiro Sato (佐藤 通弘; born 1957), Japanese shamisen player
- Michihiro Sato (ice hockey) (佐藤 道博; born 1943), Japanese ice hockey player
- Michiro Sato (佐藤 道朗; born 1967), Japanese composer, singer and musician
- Michiru Satou (佐藤 ミチル; born 1980), Japanese voice actor
- Miho Sato (佐藤 美保; born 1978), Japanese middle-distance runner
- Miki Satō (actress) (佐藤 美貴; born 1980), Japanese actress
- Miki Satō (singer) (佐藤 ミキ), Japanese musician
- Miki Sato (television personality) (佐藤 美希; born 1993), Japanese television personality, actress and model
- Mikio Sato (佐藤 幹夫; 1928–2023), Japanese mathematician
- Minako Sato (佐藤 美奈子; born 1955), Japanese archer
- Minori Sato (佐藤 穣; born 1991), Japanese footballer
- Mio Satō (佐藤 澪; born 1993), Japanese volleyball player
- Misty Sato, Professor of Education in New Zealand
- Mitsuaki Sato (佐藤 満明; born 1968), Japanese basketball player and women's basketball coach
- Mitsuhiro Sato (佐藤 光浩; born 1980), Japanese sprinter
- Mitsuru Sato (佐藤 満; born 1961), Japanese sport wrestler
- Miu Sato (佐藤 未生; born 1996), Japanese figure skater
- Miya Sato (佐藤 美耶; born 1986), Japanese volleyball player
- Miyuki Satoh (佐藤 美幸), Japanese curler
- Naoji Sato (佐藤 直司; born 1942), Japanese rower
- Naoki Satō (佐藤 直紀; born 1970), Japanese composer
- Naoki Sato (footballer) (佐藤 尚輝; born 1996), Japanese footballer
- Naoko Sato (佐藤 直子; born 1955), Japanese tennis player
- Naotake Satō (佐藤 尚武; 1882–1971), Japanese diplomat and politician
- Naoto Satō (佐藤 直人; born 1953), Japanese astronomer
- Natsuki Satō (佐藤 夏希; born 1990), Japanese idol, singer and actress
- Nobuaki Sato (佐藤 信秋; born 1947), Japanese politician
- Satō Nobuhiro (佐藤 信淵; 1769–1850), Japanese scientist
- Nobuhito Sato (佐藤 信人; born 1970), Japanese golfer
- Nobunaga Sato (佐藤 信長; born 1970), Japanese basketball coach
- Nobuo Satō (佐藤 信夫; born 1942), Japanese figure skater and coach
- Nobusuke Kishi (1896–1987), born Nobusuke Sato (佐藤 信介), former Prime Minister of Japan
- Nobuyuki Sato (佐藤 信之; born 1972), Japanese marathon runner
- Norie Sato (born 1949), American artist
- Noriko Sato (佐藤 紀子; born 1959), Japanese figure skater and coach
- Noriyuki Sato (佐藤 範幸; born 1953), Japanese fencer
- Nozomi Sato (佐藤 希望; born 1986), Japanese fencer
- O. K. Sato (1871–1921), American vaudeville performer
- Omi Sato (佐藤 大実; born 1975), Japanese footballer
- Osamu Sato (佐藤 理; born 1960), Japanese artist, photographer and composer
- Osamu Sato (boxer) (佐藤 修; born 1976), Japanese boxer
- Pater Sato (1945–1994), Japanese artist
- Rei Sato (badminton) (佐藤 黎; born 1990), Japanese badminton player
- Rei Sato (motorcyclist) (佐藤 励; born 2000), Japanese motorcycle racer
- Reiji Sato (佐藤 令治; born 1993), Japanese footballer
- Reiko Sato (佐藤 怜子; 1931–1981), American dancer and actress
- Reinaldo Sato (佐藤 二朗; born 1980), Brazilian baseball player
- Ren Sato (politician) (佐藤 錬; born 1951), Japanese politician
- Ren Sato (racing driver) (佐藤 蓮; born 2001), Japanese racing driver
- Rie Sato (ice hockey) (佐藤 理絵; born 1972), Japanese ice hockey player
- Rie Sato (softball) (佐藤 理恵; born 1980), Japanese softball player
- Rie Sato (speed skater) (佐藤 利江; born 1972), Japanese speed skater
- Rika Sato (佐藤 利香; born 1971), Japanese table tennis player
- Rikichi Sato (佐藤 利吉; 1907–1964), better known as Dewaminato, Japanese sumo wrestler
- Rikio Sato (佐藤 力夫; born 1947), Japanese bobsledder
- Rina Satō (佐藤 利奈; born 1981), Japanese voice actress and singer
- Risa Sato (佐藤 理沙; born 1994), Filipino-Japanese volleyball player
- Rumina Sato (佐藤 ルミナ; born 1973), Japanese mixed martial artist
- Ruth Sato (1904–1992), American dancer, gossip columnist, musician promoter and nightclub manager
- Ryo Sato (footballer) (佐藤 亮; born 1997), Japanese footballer
- Ryo Sato (high jumper) (佐藤 凌; born 1994), Japanese high jumper
- Ryuji Sato (佐藤 隆治; born 1977), Japanese football referee
- Ryuta Sato (佐藤 隆太; born 1980), Japanese actor and entertainer
- Ryuzo Sato (佐藤 隆三; born 1931), Japanese economist
- Sabrina Sato (born 1981), Brazilian model
- Saburo Sato (佐藤 三郎; born 1960), Japanese sailor
- Sakichi Sato (佐藤 佐吉; born 1964), Japanese actor, film director and screenwriter
- Satō Sankichi (佐藤 三吉; 1857–1947), Japanese surgeon
- Satarō Satō (佐藤 佐太郎; 1909–1987), Japanese poet
- Satomi Satō (佐藤 聡美; born 1986), Japanese voice actress and singer
- Satoshi Sato (skier) (佐藤 智; born 1962), Japanese cross-country skier
- Sayaka Sato (佐藤 冴香; born 1991), Japanese badminton player
- Setsuji Satō (佐藤 せつじ; born 1974), Japanese actor and voice actor
- Shigeki Sato (politician) (佐藤 茂樹; born 1959), Japanese politician
- Shigeki Sato (wrestler) (佐藤 茂樹; born 1969), better known as Dick Togo, Japanese professional wrestler
- Shimako Satō (佐藤 嗣麻子; born 1964), Japanese screenwriter and film director
- Shinichi Sato (baseball) (佐藤 真一; born 1965), Japanese baseball player
- Shinichi Sato (footballer) (佐藤 真一; born 1975), Japanese footballer
- Shin'ichi Satō (shogi) (佐藤 慎一; born 1982), Japanese shogi player
- Shinobu Sato (born 1955), Japanese classical guitarist
- Shinsuke Sato (佐藤 信介; born 1970), Japanese film director, screenwriter and video game designer
- Shintaro Sato (佐藤 真太郎; born 1980), Japanese bobsledder
- Shinya Sato (footballer) (佐藤 真也; born 1978), Japanese footballer
- Shin'ya Satō (shogi) (佐藤 紳哉; born 1977), Japanese shogi player
- Shio Satō (佐藤 史生; 1952–2010), Japanese manga artist
- Shiori Sato (佐藤 栞里; born 1990), Japanese model
- Shiro Sato (佐藤 志郎; born 1953), Japanese cross-country skier
- Shizuo Satō (佐藤 静雄; 1931–2022), Japanese politician
- Sho Sato (佐藤 祥; born 1993), Japanese footballer
- Shogo Sato (佐藤 正午; born 1955), Japanese writer
- Shoichi Sato (佐藤 正一; born 1947), Japanese golfer
- Shōji Satō (佐藤 翔冶; born 1982), Japanese badminton player
- Shōji Satō (artist) (佐藤 ショウジ), Japanese manga artist
- Shokichi Sato (佐藤 昌吉; born 1971), Japanese footballer
- Shoma Sato (佐藤 祥万; born 1989), Japanese baseball player
- Shori Sato (佐藤 勝利; born 1996), Japanese idol, actor and singer
- Shōzō Satō (佐藤 昌三; 1933–2025), Japanese playwright and theatre director
- Shūhō Satō (佐藤 秀峰; born 1973), Japanese manga artist
- Shūji Satō (shogi) (佐藤 秀司; born 1967), Japanese shogi player
- Shun Sato (figure skater) (佐藤 駿; born 2004), Japanese figure skater
- Shun Sato (footballer) (佐藤 隼; born 1997), Japanese footballer
- Sato Shunji (佐藤 俊二; 1896–1977), Japanese physician
- Shunsuke Sato (佐藤 俊介; born 1984), Japanese classical violinist and violist
- Somei Satoh (佐藤 聰明; born 1947), Japanese composer
- Sota Sato (佐藤 颯汰; born 1999), Japanese footballer
- Sumire Satō (佐藤 すみれ; born 1993), Japanese idol, singer and actress
- Sunao Sato (佐藤 直男; 1924–2004), Japanese Go player
- Tadamasa Sato (佐藤 忠正; born 1941), Japanese sprint canoeist
- Satō Tadanobu (佐藤 忠信; 1161–1186), Japanese samurai
- Tadanobu Satō (佐藤 忠信; born 1973), better known as Tadanobu Asano, Japanese actor
- Tadao Sato (佐藤 忠男; 1930–2022), Japanese film critic, theorist and historian
- Tadashi Satō (politician) (佐藤 正; 1849–1920), Imperial Japanese Army officer and politician
- Tadashi Sato (1923–2005), American artist
- Taichi Sato (佐藤 太一; born 1977), Japanese footballer
- Taiki Sato (佐藤 大樹; born 1995), Japanese dancer and actor
- Taisuke Sato (佐藤 泰介; born 1943), Japanese politician
- Taiten Sato (佐藤 大典; born 1983), Japanese footballer
- Takahiro Satō (佐藤 タカヒロ; 1977–2018), Japanese manga artist
- Takanao Sato (佐藤 孝尚; born 1933), Japanese water polo player
- Takanobu Sato (佐藤 貴信; born 1996), better known as Takakeisho, Japanese sumo wrestler
- Takayoshi Sato (佐藤 隆善), Japanese video game character designer, writer and CGI director
- Takenori Sato (佐藤 豪則; born 1985), Japanese mixed martial artist
- Takeru Satoh (佐藤 健; born 1989), Japanese actor
- Takeshi Sato (born 1981), Japanese professional wrestler
- Taku Satoh (佐藤 卓; born 1955), Japanese graphic designer
- Takuma Sato (佐藤 琢磨; born 1977), Japanese racing driver
- Takuma Sato (basketball) (佐藤 卓磨; born 1995), Japanese basketball player
- Takuro Sato (佐藤 拓朗), Japanese engineer
- Takuya Satō (director) (佐藤 卓哉), Japanese anime screenwriter and director
- Takuya Sato (footballer) (佐藤 拓也; born 1978), Japanese footballer
- Takuya Satō (voice actor) (佐藤 拓也; born 1984), Japanese voice actor
- Tamao Satō (さとう 珠緒; born 1973), Japanese actress, voice actress, television personality and model
- Tamiji Sato (佐藤 多美治; born 1939), Japanese sport wrestler
- Tatsuo Sato (director) (佐藤 竜雄; 1964–2026), Japanese anime director
- Tatsuo Sato (politician) (佐藤 剛男; 1937–2013), Japanese politician
- Tatsuya Satoh (佐藤 達也; born 1986), Japanese baseball player
- Tatsuya Satō (author) (佐藤 裁也; born 1962), Japanese author
- Tenpei Sato (佐藤 天平), Japanese video game composer and voice actor
- Tetsuo Sato (rower) (佐藤 哲夫; born 1938), Japanese rower
- Tetsuo Satō (volleyball) (佐藤 哲夫; 1949–2025), Japanese volleyball player
- Satō Tetsutarō (佐藤 鉄太郎; 1866–1942), Japanese admiral and military theorist
- Thomas N. Sato, Japanese educator and biologist
- Tokihiro Satō (佐藤 時啓; born 1957), Japanese photographer
- Tokio Sato (佐藤 常貴雄; born 1942), Japanese cross-country skier
- Tomiko Satō (佐藤 富子; 1893–1994), common-law wife of the Chinese Communist scholar and poet Guo Moruo
- Tomoaki Sato (baseball, born 1968) (佐藤 友昭), Japanese baseball player
- Tomoaki Satoh (baseball, born 1978) (佐藤 友亮), Japanese baseball player
- Tomoyuki Sato (佐藤 智之; born 1981), Japanese long-distance runner
- Toshiharu Sato (佐藤 寿治; born 1969), Japanese gymnast
- Toshiki Satō (サトウ トシキ; born 1961), Japanese film director and screenwriter
- Toyohiko Satoh (佐藤 豊彦; born 1943), Japanese lutenist and composer
- Satō Tsugunobu (佐藤 継信; 1158–1185), Japanese warrior
- Tsuneo Sato (佐藤 恒夫; 1925–1992), Japanese speed skater
- Tsutomu Satō (author) (佐島 勤), Japanese light novelist
- Tsutomu Sato (politician) (佐藤 勉; born 1952), Japanese politician
- Tsutomu Sato (ophthalmologist) (1902–1960), Japanese ophthalmologist
- Tsutomu Sato (windsurfer) (佐藤 務; born 1960), Japanese windsurfer
- Tsuyoshi Sato (佐藤 健; born 1988), Japanese footballer
- Vicki Sato, American biotechnologist and academic
- Yasue Sato (佐藤 康恵; born 1978), Japanese actress and model
- Yasuhiro Sato (佐藤 康弘; born 1967), Japanese baseball player
- Yasumitsu Satō (佐藤 康光; born 1969), Japanese shogi player
- Yasutaka Sato (佐藤 安孝; born 1940), Japanese volleyball player
- Yasuyuki Sato (佐藤 康之; born 1966), Japanese footballer
- Yohei Sato (佐藤 洋平; born 1972), Japanese footballer
- Yoji Sato (佐藤 要ニ; born 1949), Japanese handball player
- Yoshiaki Sato (佐藤 慶明; born 1969), Japanese footballer
- Yoshihiro Sato (佐藤 嘉洋; born 1981), Japanese kickboxer
- Yoshiko Sato (佐藤 喜子; born 1938), Japanese swimmer
- Yoshinori Sato (佐藤 由規; born 1989), Japanese baseball player
- Yoshinori Sato (baseball, born 1954) (佐藤 義則), Japanese baseball player and coach
- Yoshiyuki Sato (佐藤 佳幸; born 1975), Japanese ski mountaineer
- Yota Sato (佐藤 洋太; born 1984), Japanese boxer
- Yu Sato (佐藤 優; born 1993), Japanese baseball player
- Yūhei Satō (佐藤 雄平; born 1947), Japanese politician
- Yuhei Sato (footballer) (佐藤 優平; born 1990), Japanese footballer
- Yūichi Satō (佐藤 祐市; born 1962), Japanese film director
- Yuka Sato (佐藤 有香; born 1973), Japanese figure skater
- Yuka Sato (javelin thrower) (佐藤 友佳; born 1992), Japanese javelin thrower
- Yuka Sato (triathlete) (佐藤 優香; born 1992), Japanese triathlete
- Yukari Sato (佐藤 ゆかり; born 1961), Japanese economist and politician
- Yuki Sato (athlete) (佐藤 悠基; born 1986), Japanese long-distance runner
- Yuki Sato (footballer) (佐藤 悠希; born 1988), Japanese footballer
- Yuki Sato (softball) (佐藤 由希; born 1980), Japanese softball player
- Yuki Sato (voice actor) (佐藤 佑暉), Japanese voice actor
- Yuki Sato (wrestler) (佐藤 悠己; born 1985), Japanese professional wrestler
- Yukihiko Sato (佐藤 由紀彦; born 1976), Japanese footballer
- Yukiya Satō (佐藤 幸椰; born 1995), Japanese ski jumper
- Yuko Sato (athlete) (佐藤 優子; born 1968), Japanese racewalker
- Yuko Sato (politician) (佐藤 夕子; born 1963), Japanese politician
- Yūko Satō (voice actress) (佐藤 ゆうこ), Japanese voice actress
- Yusuke Sato (佐藤 悠介; born 1977), Japanese footballer
- Yuta Sato (佐藤 祐太; born 1995), Japanese footballer
- Yūto Satō (佐藤 勇人; born 1982), Japanese footballer
- Yuya Sato (footballer) (佐藤 優也; born 1986), Japanese footballer
- Yuya Sato (novelist) (佐藤 友哉; born 1980), Japanese writer
- Yukiko Okada (1967–1986), born Kayo Sato (佐藤 佳代), Japanese idol singer

== Fictional characters ==
- Ayano Sato (佐藤 綾乃), a character in the manga series High School Girls
- Asami Sato, a character in the television series The Legend of Korra
- Bruce Sato, from the toy franchise and cartoon M.A.S.K.
- Gloria Sato, a character in the animated television series Big City Greens
- Hana Satō (佐藤 花), a character in the manga series Castle Town Dandelion
- Hiroshi Sato, a character from The Legend of Korra
- Hoshi Sato, a character in the television series Star Trek: Enterprise
- Ichirō Satō (佐藤 一郎), protagonist of the light novel Aura: Koga Maryuin's Last War
- Inoue Sato, a character in the novel The Lost Symbol
- Ishi Sato, a character from the video game Bulletstorm
- Jun Satō (佐藤 潤), a character in the manga series Working!!
- Jun Sato, a character in the television series Star Wars Rebels
- Kazuma Sato (佐藤 和真), protagonist of the light novel series KonoSuba
- Keisaku Satou (佐藤 啓作), a character in the light novel series Shakugan no Shana
- Kouji Satou (佐藤 先生), a character in the anime series Yu-Gi-Oh! GX
- Lilly Satou (砂藤 リリー), a character in the visual novel Katawa Shoujo
- Mafuyu Satō (佐藤 真冬), a character in the manga series Given
- Masao Sato (Max) (佐藤 マサオ), a character in the manga series Crayon Shin-chan
- Masashi Sato (佐藤 雅史), a character in the visual novel To Heart
- Mina Sato (佐藤 美菜), a character in the manga series Doubt!!
- Miwako Sato (佐藤 美和子), a character in the manga series Case Closed
- Natsumi Sato, a character in the manga series Jiraishin a.k.a. Ice Blade
- Rikidō Satō (砂藤 力道), a character in the manga series My Hero Academia
- Ryōko Satō (佐藤 一郎), a character in the light novel Aura: Koga Maryuin's Last War
- Ryōta Satō (佐藤 リョータ), protagonist of the manga series Kyō no Go no Ni
- Sakie Satō (佐藤 早紀絵), a character in the manga series Interviews with Monster Girls
- Sebastian Sato, a character in the video game Hitman
- Sei Sato (佐藤 聖), a character in the manga series Maria-sama ga Miteru
- Shigeki Satō (佐藤 成樹), a character in the manga series Whistle!
- Shin Sato (佐藤 心), a character in the video game series The Idolmaster Cinderella Girls
- Shōji Satō (佐藤 昭二), a character in the manga series Shokugeki no Soma
- Takaya Satō (佐藤 隆哉), a character in the light novel series Golden Time
- Tatsuhiro Satō (佐藤 達広), a character in the manga series Welcome to the N.H.K.
- Toru Sato (a.k.a. Bull), a character in the video game Need for Speed: Most Wanted
- Toshiko Sato, a character in the television series Torchwood and Doctor Who
- Toshiya Sato, a character in the manga series Major
- Yō Satō (佐藤 洋), protagonist of the light novel series Ben-To
- Sato, a character in the manga series Ajin: Demi-Human
- Sato, a character in the film Black Rain
- Satō, a character in the anime series Genji Tsūshin Agedama
- Sato, a character in the anime series Mobile Suit Gundam SEED Destiny
