= Suzuki Magoichi (disambiguation) =

Suzuki Magoichi (鈴木孫一 or 鈴木孫市, c. 1534 – c. 2 May 1589 was an alternate name of Suzuki Shigehide (鈴木重秀). The name was also used by multiple people as a pseudonym, including:

- Suzuki Shigeoki (鈴木重意, 1511–1585), a Japanese samurai
- Suzuki Shigetomo (鈴木重朝, d.1615–1624), a Japanese samurai of the Mito Domain
- Suzuki Yoshikane (鈴木義兼, d.1589), a Japanese samurai of the Suzuki clan and brother to Suzuki Shigehide
