= Engineered Garments =

Clothing brand

Engineered Garments is a clothing, footwear and accessories brand founded by Japanese-American Daiki Suzuki. It was founded in 1999.

The brand has collaborated with Uniqlo, Gola, Paraboot, K-Swiss, Hoka One One, Converse, Reebok, and others.

== See also ==
- Visvim
- United Arrows
- Beams
- Kapital
- A.PRESSE
