= A.PRESSE =

Japanese menswear brand

A.PRESSE (アプレッセ) is a Japanese menswear brand founded by Kazuma Shigematsu in 2021. Its flagship store is in Jingūmae, Shibuya. Outside of Japan, A.PRESSE is available at menswear speciality stores such as Union LA and HAVEN.

== See also ==
- Visvim
- United Arrows
- Beams
- Kapital
- Engineered Garments
