= Masahisa =

- Gender: Male

Origin
- Origin: Japanese
- Meaning: Different meanings depending on the kanji used

Masahisa (written: 昌久, 正久 or 政尚) is a masculine Japanese given name. Notable people with the name include:

- Masahisa Fujita (藤田 昌久; born 1943), Japanese economist
- Masahisa Fukase (深瀬 昌久; 1934–2012), Japanese photographer
- Sakai Masahisa (坂井 政尚; died 1570), Japanese samurai
- Masahisa Sato (佐藤 正久; born 1960), Japanese politician
- Suzuki Masahisa (鈴木 正久; 1912–1969), Japanese pastor
- Masahisa Takenaka (竹中 正久; 1933–1985), Japanese yakuza member
- Uemura Masahisa (植村 正久; 1857–1925), Japanese pastor, theologian and critic
