= Teruaki =

- Gender: Male

Origin
- Origin: Japanese
- Meaning: Different meanings depending on the kanji used

Teruaki (written: 光昭, 久晃, 照明 or 輝昭) is a masculine Japanese given name. Notable people with the name include:

- Teruaki Kobayashi (小林 久晃; born 1979), Japanese footballer
- Teruaki Kurobe (黒部 光昭; born 1978), Japanese footballer
- Teruaki Masumoto (増元 照明; born 1955), Japanese activist
- Teruaki Ogawa (小川 輝晃; born 1968), Japanese actor and voice actor
- Teruaki Suzuki (鈴木 輝昭; born 1958), Japanese classical composer
- Teruaki Yoshikawa (吉川 輝昭; born 1981), Japanese baseball player
- Teruaki Satō (佐藤 輝明; born 1999), Japanese baseball player
- Teruaki Mukaiyama (向山 光昭; born 1927), Japanese organic chemist
