= Takurō =

- Gender: Male

Origin
- Origin: Japanese
- Meaning: Different meanings depending on the kanji used

Takurō, Takuro, Takurou or Takuroh (written: 拓郎, 拓朗, 卓郎, 卓朗, 卓廊, 琢郎 or 琢朗) is a masculine Japanese given name. Notable people with the name include:

- Takuro (musician) (久保 琢郎; born 1971), Japanese musician
- Takuro Fujii (藤井 拓郎; born 1985), Japanese swimmer
- Takuro Ishii (石井 琢朗; born 1970), Japanese baseball player
- Takuro Kaneko (金子 拓郎; born 1997), Japanese footballer
- Takuro Kikuoka (菊岡 拓朗; born 1985), Japanese footballer
- Takurō Kitagawa (喜多川 拓郎; born 1949), Japanese voice actor
- Takuro Miuchi (箕内 拓郎; born 1975), Japanese rugby union player
- Takuro Nishimura (西村 卓朗; born 1975), Japanese footballer
- Takuro Oda (小田 卓朗; born 1992), Japanese speed skater
- Takurō Ōno (大野 拓朗; born 1988), Japanese actor
- Takuro Sato (佐藤 拓朗), Japanese engineer
- Takuro Shintani (新谷 卓郎; 1943–1980), Japanese mathematician
- Takuro Yajima (矢島 卓郎; born 1984), Japanese footballer
- Takuro Yamashita (山下 拓郎; born 1988), Japanese ice hockey player
- Takuro Yoshida (吉田 拓郎; born 1946), Japanese singer-songwriter
