= Takayuki Suzuki (disambiguation) =

Takayuki Suzuki may refer to:

- Takayuki Suzuki (born 1976), 鈴木 隆行 Japanese international football player
- Takayuki Suzuki (footballer, born 1973), 鈴木 敬之 Japanese football player
- Takayuki Suzuki (swimmer) (born 1987), 鈴木 孝幸 Japanese Paralympic swimmer
