= Ikko =

Ikko may refer to:

- Ikkō-shū, a Buddhist sect
- Ikkō-ikki, armed military leagues who rose up against samurai rule in 15th- and 16th-century Japan

== People ==
- Ikko (makeup artist) (born 1962), Japanese makeup artist and TV personality
- Ikko Nakatsuka (中塚 一宏; born 1965), Japanese politician
- Ikkō Narahara (奈良原 一高; 1931–2020), photographer
- Ikko Suzuki (鈴木 一功; born 1952), Japanese actor
- Ikko Tanaka (田中 一光; 1930–2002), Japanese graphic designer
