= Satō–Suzuki Baseball Match =

2025 match in Sano, Tochigi, Japan

Suzukis	Satōs
(Japan)	(Japan)
2	4
- Teams: Suzukis; Satōs
- Date: March 9, 2025
- Venue: Agekke Sano Yakyujo ballpark
- City: Sano, Tochigi, Japan
- Managers: Ichiro Suzuki (Suzukis); Takahiko Sato (Satōs)
- Time of game: 12:45 p.m. (JST)
- Television: Tochigi Television

The Satō–Suzuki Baseball Match (Japanese: 佐藤VS鈴木草野球大会, Hepburn: Satō VS Suzuki Kusayakyū Taikai) was an amateur baseball match between people with the surnames of Satō and Suzuki, the first and second-most common surnames in Japan, respectively. It was held on March 9, 2025, a day before "Satō Day", at the Agekke Sano Yakyujo ballpark in Sano, Tochigi. In March 2026, a football match was also held in the same city between the two.

== Background ==
Satō is the most common surname in Japan, with approximately 1.86 million people (1.5% of the population) bearing it as of 2023. It is believed to have originated in Sano, Tochigi, which calls itself "Holyland of Satō" and hosts an annual "Satō Day" on March 10, when Satōs receive discounts in the city.

Suzuki is Japan's second most common surname, with approximately 1.77 million people having the surname. It is believed to have originated in Kainan, Wakayama.

== Preparation ==
In December 2024, the city of Sano announced it would be holding a baseball game between the two common surnames, calling the event the "final showdown for surname pride." 90 people applied to be players (47 for Satō and 43 for Suzuki), but only 15 for each team were selected.

== Match ==
The match was held on March 9, 2025, at 12:45 p.m. at the Agekke Sano Yakyujo ballpark in Sano, Tochigi. The teams were coached by former professional baseball players Takahiko Sato and Ichiro Suzuki. More than 600 people from Kainan, Wakayama cheered for the Suzukis. The game had seven innings and used a hard rubber ball instead of the regular baseball. The match was won 4–2 by the Satōs. The MVP of the match was Ryūji Satō, a firefighter from Nagareyama, Chiba Prefecture.

== Soccer match ==
On December 3, 2025, Sano City announced that it would hold a soccer match between the two surnames on March 8, 2026. It was to be held at Continental Home Field in Akami-cho, Sano, starting at 1:30 pm. The registration ended on January 4, 2026.

The coach for the Satōs was Yuto Sato, a retired midfielder for the Japan national team, and coach for the Suzukis was footballer Ichiro Suzuki. The match was held as scheduled, with the Satōs winning against the Suzukis 4–2. The MVP was a 42-year old civil servant from Hannō in Saitama Prefecture.

== See also ==
- Josh fight
