= Toby Suzuki =

Darshan_md2003

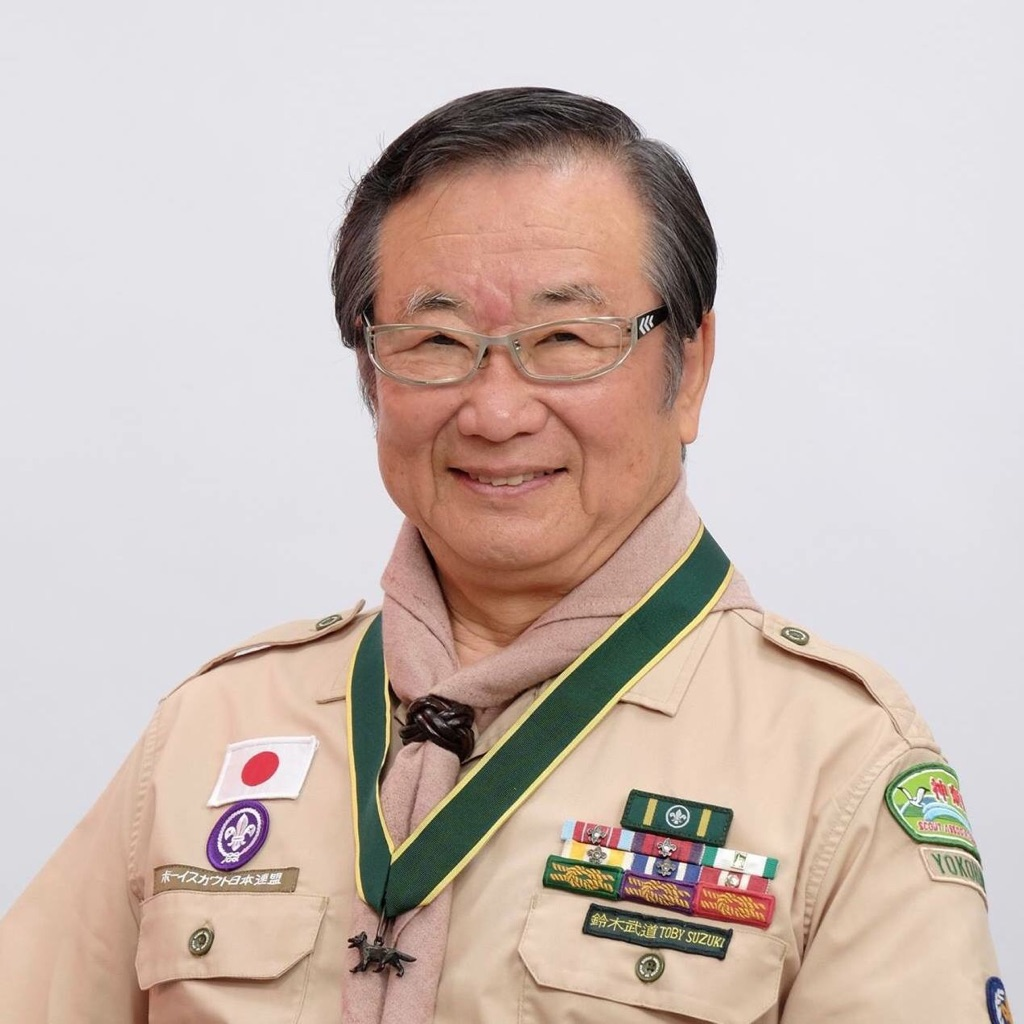
- Suzuki in August 2018
- Born: 22 June 1943 (age 83)
- Awards: 314th Bronze Wolf

Takemichi Toby Suzuki (鈴木武道, Suzuki Takemichi) (born June 22, 1943), a former elected member of the World Scout Committee from 1999 to 2005, served as the former chairman of the Information and Communications Technology subcommittee of the Asia-Pacific Region of the World Organization of the Scout Movement from 1995 to 1998, former member of the National Executive Council and the National Board of the Scout Association of Japan from 1993 to 2007.

Suzuki was a Hayabusa Scout. He went to Tokai University and then went to the United States in 1966 and studied Industrial Management for his MS at the University of California, Los Angeles. By profession, he was IBM Managing Director of Olympic projects at Nagano and Sydney. He has lived in Sydney, Australia and lives in Yokohama.

In October 2007, Suzuki was awarded the 314th Bronze Wolf, the only distinction of the World Organization of the Scout Movement, awarded by the World Scout Committee for exceptional services to world Scouting, during the Asia Pacific Scout Conference held at the Yoyogi Olympic Youth Center in Tokyo. Jørgen G. Rasmussen, President of the Honor Committee, World Organization of Scout Movement announced the citation for the award of the Bronze Wolf to Suzuki.

He is married to Reiko Suzuki, the International commissioner of the Scout Association of Japan and a member of the Asia-Pacific Scout Committee.
