= Kennosuke Sato =

Kennosuke (Ken) Satō (佐藤 剣之助, Satō Kennosuke; 1891-1967) was a writer and overseas journalist for the Osaka Mainichi Shimbun newspaper. He also wrote under the pen name Amanojaku.

He had been educated at Washington Grammar School, San Francisco, also attending University of Southern California, Illinois, and Chicago. He worked on a Ph.D. at Columbia University in 1921 and attended the University of Berlin in 1922/3. He was a fluent speaker of English.

He worked for the Osaka Mainichi Shimbun, under the presidency of Shingoro Takahashi. He spent some time in Australia. On one particular goodwill voyage there, with the support of the newspaper, he accompanied Dr. Kenichi Abe and a group of 10 Japanese businessmen. The group was in Australia for about six weeks, but Sato remained for 5 months. He gathered material for a trade relations booklet, Japan, Australia and New Zealand. It was published by the Osaka Mainichi in 1936, in both English and Japanese editions.
