= Beams (brand) =

Japanese clothing brand

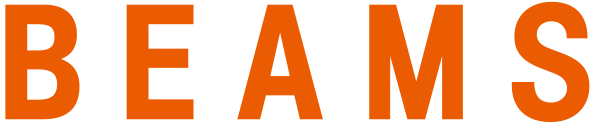
- Industry: Department and clothing store
- Founded: Harajuku district of Tokyo, Japan 1976
- Headquarters: Tokyo, Japan
- Key people: Yo Shitara, CEO

Beams (ビームス) is a Japanese clothing brand established in 1976 in Harajuku, Tokyo by Etsuzo Shitara. The current CEO is Yō Shitara (設楽洋). The brand has 167 stores in Japan, and 10 stores overseas, including in Milan, London, and Paris.

== About ==
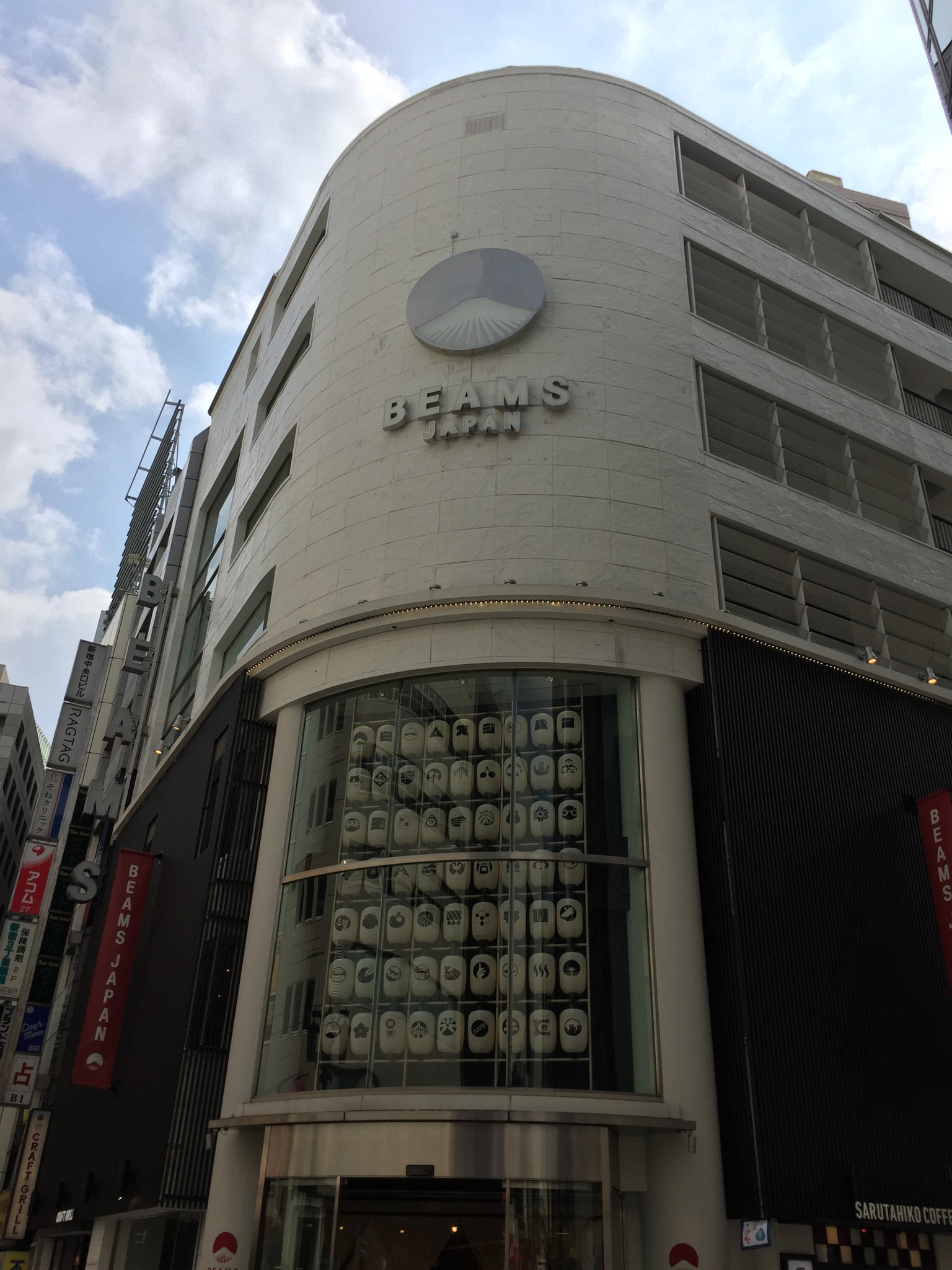
A Beams store in Shinjuku

Beams department stores carry products such as interior goods, furniture, galleries, clothing, shoes, and accessories. Beams clothing department offers shoes, bags, accessories, men's and women's casual, as well as custom-tailored pieces. Beams logo and artwork are seen as abstract and have a cartoonish look.

== History ==
In May 2005, Beams expanded its business internationally. The next store they opened up was located in Hong Kong and began as a women's clothing shop. In 2006, the company expanded again to a number of different locations. Their most recent store opened in March 2015 in Bangkok.

== Collaboration ==
In June 2017 Beam collaborated with McDonald's to manufacture a limited edition of Big Mac-themed t-shirts, hats, and iPhone 7 covers.

In 2020, Beams began doing projects in Social VR spaces, starting with Hikky's Virtual Market 5 in VRChat. The event opened on December 18, 2020, running from December 19, 2020, to January 10, 2021. Since then, Beams has participated in every Virtual Market event as a sponsor, began their own clothing and premium VR Avatar Line, and started a project on social media under the moniker "Virtual_Beams". Beams began offering Virtual Clothing for avatars that match Real-world products in-store as a Digital Twin.

In 2024, Beams collaborated with Columbia PFG on fishing jackets and pants.

In 2025, "Virtual Beams" began creating their own worlds in VRChat, under the hashtag "TokyoMoodbyBEAMS", Beams now offers 3D Clothing for popular avatars.

== See also ==
- United Arrows
