= Tatsuya Satō (author) =

Japanese author and auditor

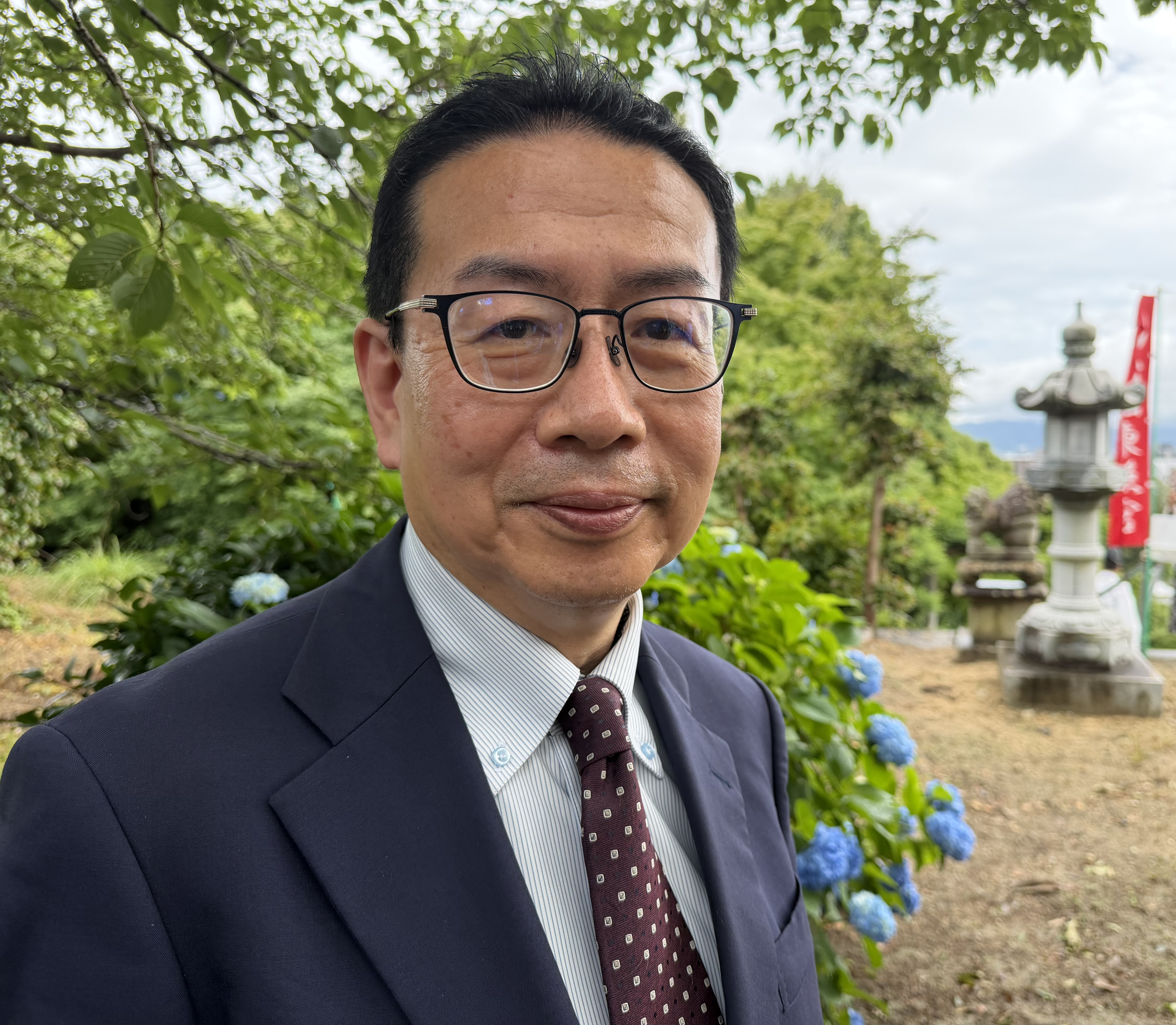
Tatsuya Satō, the author of Okinawa Tantō 2000-nichi no Kiroku" visited Matsuyama Toshogu

Tatsuya Satō (佐藤 裁也, born 25 November 1962) is a Japanese former civil servant and corporate auditor. He served in Japan's central government, including positions within the Cabinet Secretariat (Japan) and the Ministry of Internal Affairs and Communications(MIC), and later became an outside statutory auditor of NTT West, a subsidiary of Nippon Telegraph and Telephone.

Satō is the author of Okinawa Tantō 2000-nichi no Kiroku: Heisei no Okinawa Shinkō (2022). The volume includes introductory prefaces by Hisashi Owada and Teijirō Furukawa, and an analytical commentary by historian Makoto Iokibe (五百籏頭眞). The book was reviewed in the Ministry of Foreign Affairs journal Diplomacy (Vol. 77, 2023), which discussed its account of Okinawa policy during the administrations of Prime Ministers Ryutaro Hashimoto and Keizō Obuchi.

== Early life and education ==
Satō was born on 25 November 1962 in Fukuyama, Hiroshima Prefecture, Japan. He graduated from the University of Tokyo.

== Career ==
Satō began work at the Ministry of Posts and Telecommunications in 1986. He later served in senior administrative roles in Shikoku and Kyushu's Regional Bureaus.

During his career, he was involved in Okinawa policy administration, including assignments in the Cabinet Secretariat's Okinawa Affairs Office. A 2020 biography of diplomat Yukio Okamoto notes that Satō, then an official at the Okinawa Affairs Office, provided essential administrative and policy support to Okamoto during his tenure as Special Advisor to the Prime Minister on Okinawa.

After retiring from government service in 2018, he served as an adviser in the private sector and became an outside statutory auditor of NTT West in 2022.

== Publications ==
- Satō, Tatsuya. Okinawa Tantō 2000-nichi no Kiroku: Heisei no Okinawa Shinkō. Tokyo: Shinzan-sha, 2022.
- Satō, Tatsuya. Toppu ni Kiku Shikoku Rikatsuyō no Seibi ni Torikumu. Ehime Prefecture: Ehime Journal, 2016.
