= Thomas N. Sato =

Thomas N. Sato (佐藤 匠徳) is a prominent Japanese educator, entrepreneur, and biologist, whose research focuses on understanding molecular basis of cancer, cardiac disease and metabolic diseases by using a number of animal models including mice, zebrafish and fruit flies. He is also working to invent next-generation therapeutics for human diseases based on the stochastic basis of life and disease. He is currently director of the Thomas N. Sato BioMEC-X Laboratories at the Advanced Telecommunications Research Institute International (ATR) in Kyoto, research director of the ERATO Sato Live Bio-forecasting project JST in Kyoto, scientific founder and chair of board of directors Karydo TherapeutiX, Inc, professor of Virtual Human InformatiX Clinic in Nara, and affiliate professor at Centenary Institute in Sydney, Australia. He is also a triathlete who competes at Ironman distance including Ironman Lake Placid, Ironman Japan, Ironman Coeur d’Alene.

== Life ==
- University of Tsukuba, Japan, BS 1985
- Georgetown University, Graduate School of Biological Sciences/Neuroscience, Ph.D. 1988
- Scripps Research Institute, Postdoctoral Fellow 1989-1990
- Roche Institute of Molecular Biology, Assistant Member 1991-1995
- Harvard Medical School, Assistant Professor 1995-1997
- Univ. of Texas Southwestern Medical School, Associate Professor 1997-2001 (Tenured in 1999)
- Univ. of Texas Southwestern Medical School, Professor 2002-2004
- Weill Medical College of Cornell University, Professor 2005-2006
- Weill Medical College of Cornell University, Joseph C. Hinsey Professor 2005-2009
- Nara Institute of Science and Technology Graduate School of Biological Sciences, Japan, Professor 2009
- Cornell University, Biomedical Engineering, Adjunct Professor 2009–2019
- Centenary Institute, Sydney, Australia, Affiliate Professor 2009–present

== Works ==
- Discoveries of Tie1, Tie2, and angiopoietins, that play the key roles in the blood vessel formation.

== Awards ==
- National Science Contest for Elementary School Students, 1st-place winner, Japan, 1973
- Cold Spring Harbor Summer Fellowship, Cold Spring Harbor Laboratories, Cold Spring Harbor, NY 1998
- American Heart Association, Established Investigator Award, USA 1998-2003
- Japanese Endocrinology and Cardiovascular Society, Jokichi Takamine Research Award, Japan 2005
- Listed among top 1% most cited authors for journals in Molecular Biology and Genetics 2006
- Scientific Advisory Board Member, Surface Logix, Inc. 2006-2008
