= Reiko Suzuki (Scouting) =

Deputy National Commissioner of the Scout Association of Japan

- 鈴木 令子
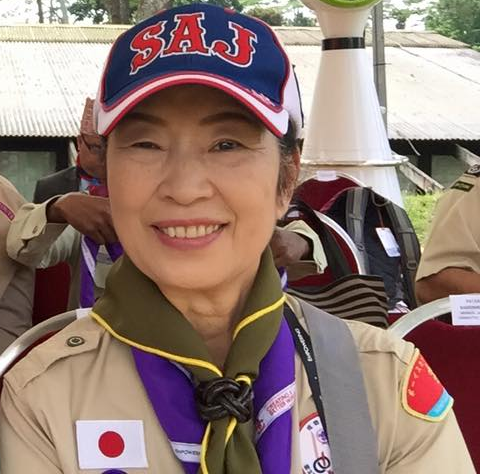

Deputy National Commissioner of the Scout Association of Japan

Reiko Suzuki (鈴木れい子, Suzuki Reiko; born March 6) serves as the Deputy National Commissioner of the Scout Association of Japan. She also serves as the 2nd Vice-Chairman of the Asia-Pacific Regional Scout Committee from 2012 to 2018.

Suzuki also serves as a Board Member of the Olave Baden-Powell Society Board of Directors, and is a Life Member of the Kandersteg International Scout Centre.

She is married to Toby Suzuki, a former member of the World Scout Committee from 1999 to 2005 and a former member of the Asia-Pacific Scout Committee, and lives in Yokohama, Japan.

In 2013, Suzuki was awarded the Rupaula Katush award by the Nepal Scouts. In 2017, she was awarded the 354th Bronze Wolf, the only distinction of the World Organization of the Scout Movement, awarded by the World Scout Committee for exceptional services to world Scouting.
