= G. G. Sato =

Japanese baseball player (born 1978)

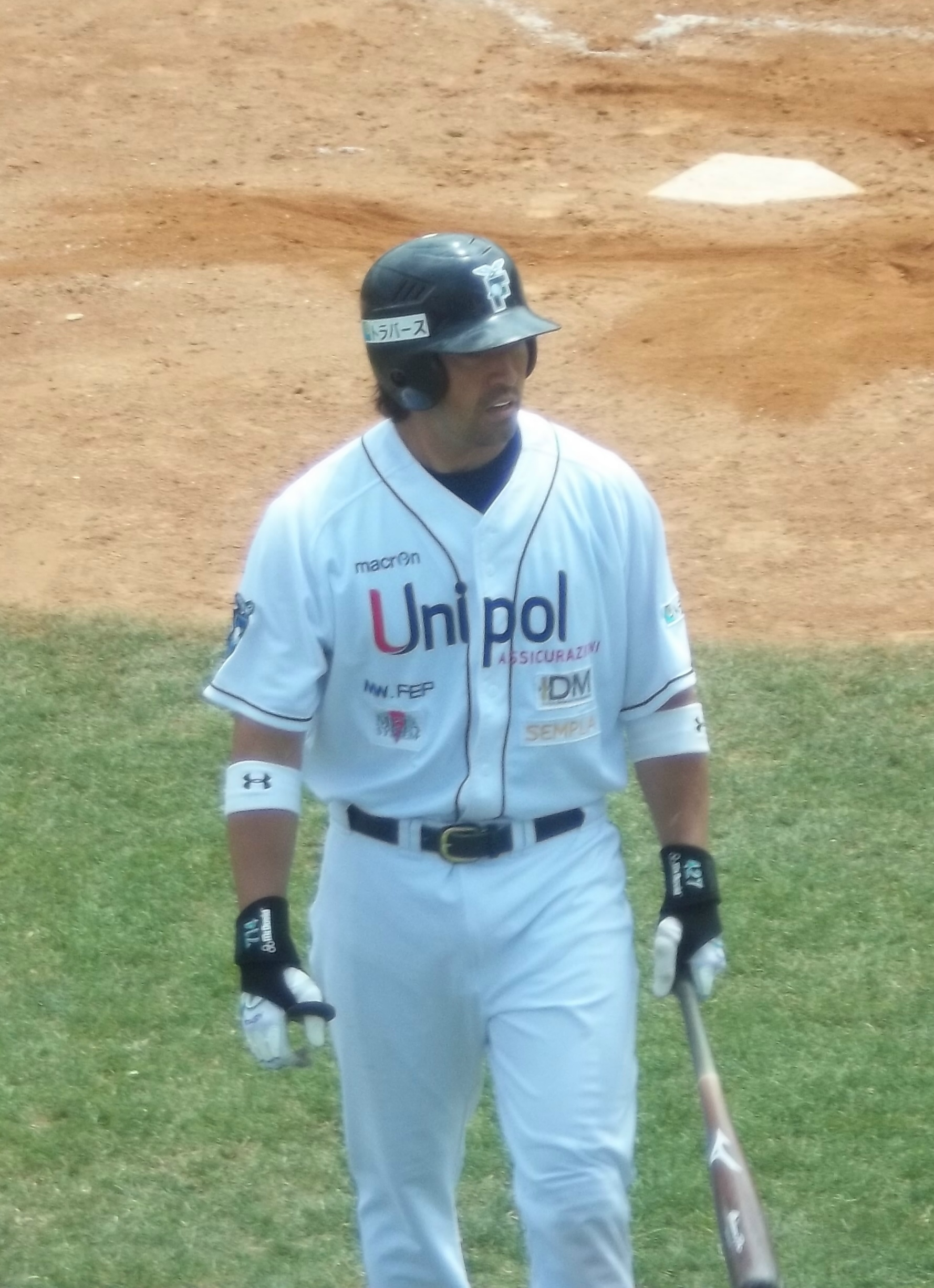
- Catcher / Outfielder
- Born: August 9, 1978 (age 47); Ichikawa, Chiba, Japan
- Batted: Right Threw: Right

NPB debut
- March 30, 2004, for the Seibu Lions

Last NPB appearance
- October 8, 2013, for the Chiba Lotte Marines

NPB statistics (through 2013 season)
- Batting average: .278
- Hits: 495
- RBIs: 267
- Stats at Baseball Reference

Teams
- Seibu Lions/Saitama Seibu Lions (2004–2011); Chiba Lotte Marines (2013)

Career highlights and awards
- NPL All-Star (2008)

Takahiko Sato (佐藤 隆彦, Satō Takahiko; born August 9, 1978, in Ichikawa, Chiba, Japan), also known as G. G. Sato, is a former professional player for the Philadelphia Phillies organization, Saitama Seibu Lions, Chiba Lotte Marines, and Fortitudo Baseball Bologna.

== Career ==
Sato began his professional career signing with the Philadelphia Phillies organization in 2000 before making his on field debut for the Batavia Muckdogs of Minor League Baseball in 2001 hitting .261 with 4 home runs and 21 RBIs. In 2002 he played again in Batavia as well as the Gulf Coast League. He was promoted to the Lakewood BlueClaws for the 2003 season and hit .247 with 6 home runs and 42 RBIs.

Sato was selected in the seventh round by the Saitama Seibu Lions in 2003 draft upon returning to Japan, where he would play from 2004 until 2011.

Sato briefly played in Fortitudo Baseball Bologna in the Italian Baseball League in 2012 as well as Chiba Lotte Marines in 2013.

== International career ==
Sato played for Japan at the 2008 Summer Olympics.

== Personal ==
Sato got his nickname G. G. while at Hosei University because it was thought he had the face of an old man, or jiji (爺). Sato worked as a security guard upon returning to Japan in 2003 before trying out for the Lions. He now works for his father's company, Travers, in Japan.

== See also ==
- Satō–Suzuki Baseball Match
