= Daiki Suzuki =

American fashion designer

Daiki Suzuki is a Japanese-born American fashion designer and founder of Engineered Garments. His brother, Takuji Suzuki, founded the brand ts(s).

== Style ==
Suzuki says of his work, "I try to choose good dynamic designs with patterns that can be modified for today's use. Usually I re-work the fits as lightly as possible, being careful not to re-produce vintage designs—adding some things and taking some off, balancing it out to make it look new."

== Woolrich Woolen Mills ==
In the 1970s, Suzuki was one of the first buyers of Woolrich fashion in Japan. In 2006, he became a designer for Woolrich Woolen Mills in the USA.

== Engineered Garments ==
Suzuki founded Engineered Garments as a fashion design and production company in 1999. Engineered Garments produces variations of sportsgear and hunting wear.

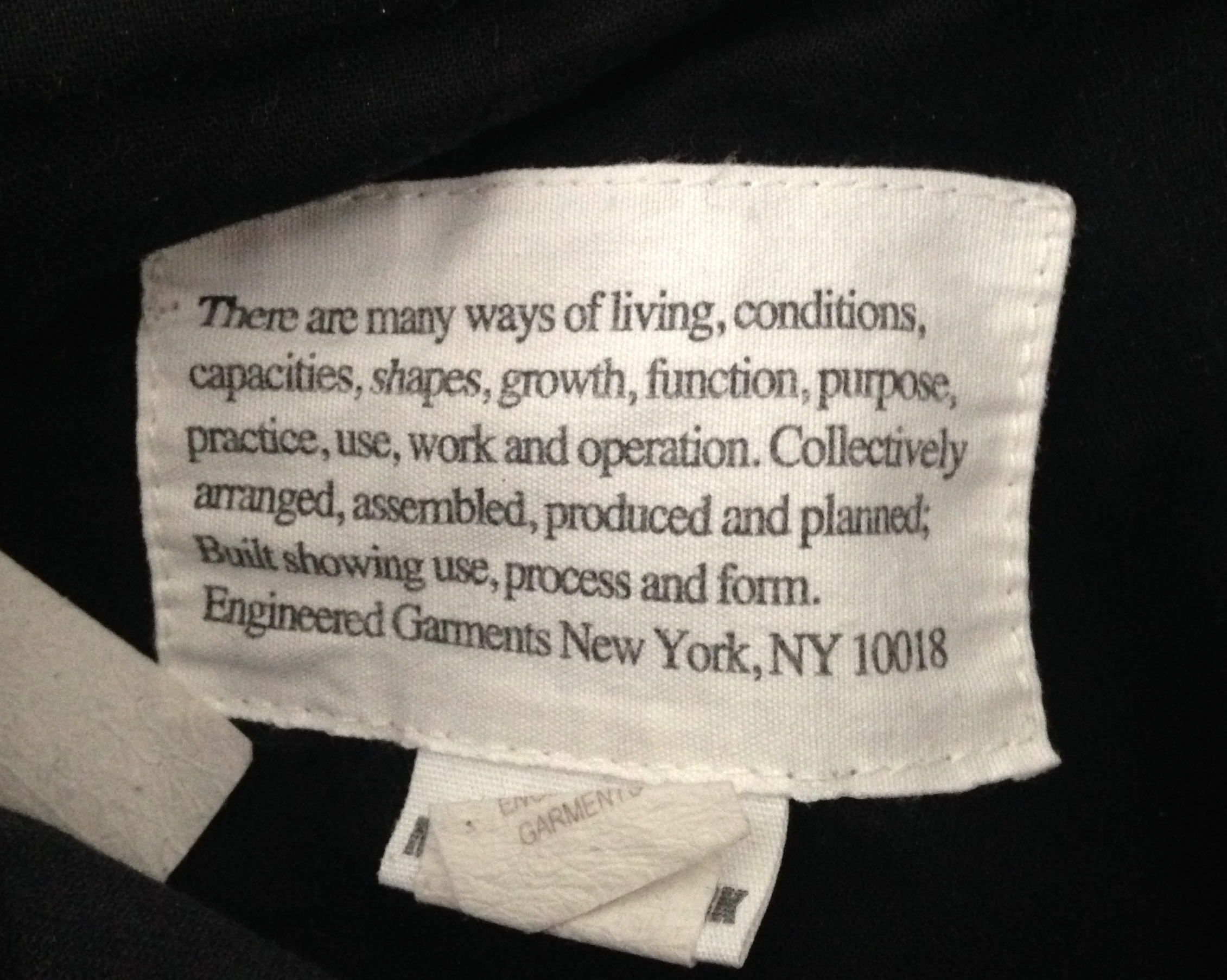
Tag on the inside front pocket of a pair of S/S 2014 Engineered Garments pants. Includes mission statement.
