= Suzuki Magoichi =

Japanese samurai

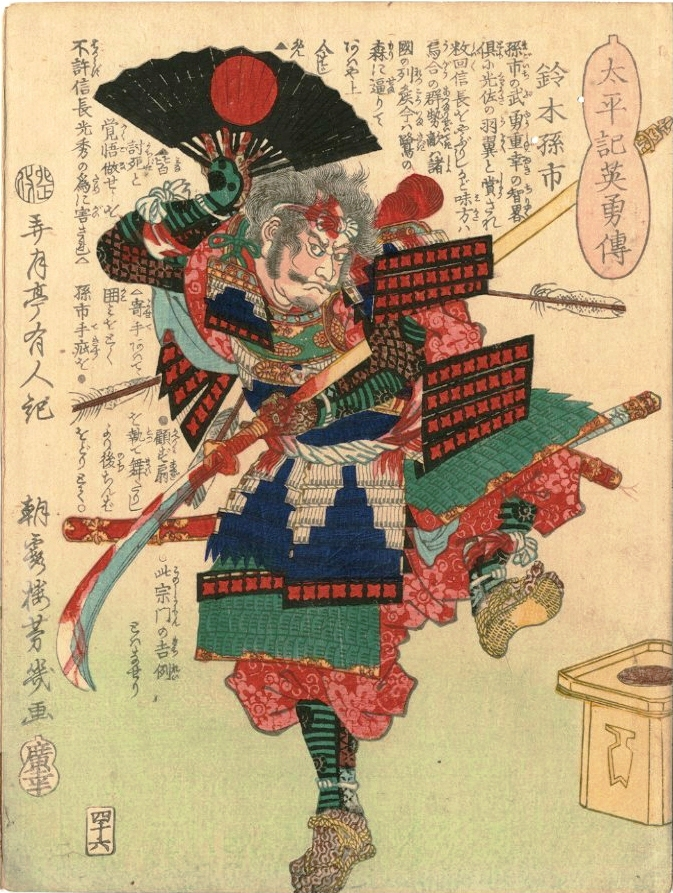
Suzuki Magoichi

Suzuki Magoichi (鈴木孫一 or 鈴木孫市, c. 1534 – c. May 2, 1589) was a better-known alternate name of Suzuki Shigehide (鈴木重秀), a samurai and military leader during the late Sengoku and early Azuchi-Momoyama periods. He is famous for arming his troops with arquebuses and donning the yatagarasu as his family crest.

He was also known by other names, including Saiga Magoichi (雑賀孫一), Saika Magoichi (雑賀孫市), Hirai Magoichi (平井孫市), and simply Magoichi. The name "Saika (or Suzuki) Magoichi" was given to the leader of the Saika Ikki, and Suzuki Shigeoki and Suzuki Shigetomo were also referred to by this name. He was a friend of Ankokuji Ekei.

== Genealogy ==
He is said to be the second eldest son of Suzuki Sadayu, but the veracity of this claim is unknown. This is mainly because his name is not listed in historical records available to the public, making the authenticity of the "Shigehide" name even more dubious. Though said to be a warrior of distinguished prowess, details regarding his services remain scant. Aside from his distinct hatred for Nobunaga, the rest of his history is filled with half-truths, rumors, or theories. According to the Sengoku Engi, he was said to have been a great warrior.

== Exploits ==
It is said that he participated in the Hongan-ji riots as well and led 3,000 gunmen into battle. He is accredited for causing Harada Naomasa's death on the field. Despite being allied with the Miyoshi clan, legends state that Shigehide sympathized with the Honganji rebels and was only loyal to them. When the Saika group surrendered to Hideyoshi years later, Shigehide was said to have tried to save his family from destruction. However, he could not convince Hideyoshi to spare them and his family's property fell into ruin.

From there, the tales surrounding his fate differ from one another. One story says that he served Hideyoshi briefly before he also decided to commit suicide. Another states that he faithfully continued to serve the Toyotomi family until Sekigahara and joined the Eastern army. There, he was employed by Date Masamune to be his secondary arquebus troop. A few tales said that he became a wanderer and died as a hermit late in his life. After Torii Mototada's downfall during the battle of Sekigahara, he is said to have lived the rest of his days as a rōnin in Mito Domain.

In woodblock prints of the Edo period which showed him, his name was often given as "Suzuchi Hida-no-kami Shigeyuki", due to the strict censorship of the period, which forbade illustration of recent historical events.

== Works cited ==
- Varshavskaya, Elena (15 November 2021). Heroes of the Grand Pacification: Kuniyoshi's Taiheiki eiyū den. Brill. p. 114. ISBN 978-90-04-48918-9.
- Suzuki, Masaya (August 2004). 戦国鉄砲・傭兵隊 天下人に逆らった紀州雑賀衆 [Sengoku Period - Guns and Mercenaries: The Kishu Saika Clan Who Defied the Ruler of Japan] (in Japanese). Tokyo: Heibonsha. ISBN 4-582-85236-X. OCLC 60421503.
- 和歌山市史編纂委員会 (Wakayama City History Compilation Committee) (1991). 和歌山市史 第1巻 自然・原始・古代・中世 [Wakayama City History Volume 1: Nature, Primitive, Ancient, and Medieval] (in Japanese). City of Wakayama.
