= Teruaki Suzuki =

Japanese composer (born 1958)

- Born: February 16, 1958; Japan Miyagi prefecture
- Other name: 鈴木 輝昭
- Occupation: composer

Teruaki Suzuki (鈴木 輝昭, born February 16, 1958, in Sendai, Miyagi) is a Japanese composer known for choral compositions.

== Biography ==
Teruaki Suzuki graduated from Toho Gakuen School of Music, where he studied under Akira Miyoshi. He has won many prestigious awards, such as first place in the 46th Nihon Ongaku Konkūru.
