= Takayuki Suzuki (footballer, born 1973) =

Japanese footballer

Takayuki Suzuki 鈴木 隆行
Personal information
- Full name: Takayuki Suzuki
- Date of birth: October 4, 1973 (age 53)
- Place of birth: Chiba, Japan
- Height: 1.81 m (5 ft 11 1/2 in)
- Position: Goalkeeper

Youth career
- 1989–1991: Narashino High School
- 1992–1995: Chuo University

Senior career*
| Years | Team | Apps | (Gls) |
| 1996–2000 | FC Tokyo | 48 | (0) |
| Total | | 48 | (0) |
- * Club domestic league appearances and goals

Takayuki Suzuki (鈴木 敬之, Suzuki Takayuki; born October 4, 1973) is a former Japanese football player.

== Playing career ==
Suzuki was born in Chiba Prefecture on October 4, 1973. After graduating from Chuo University, he joined Japan Football League club Tokyo Gas (later FC Tokyo) in 1996. In 1997, he became the club's starting goalkeeper in place of the injured Hiromitsu Horiike. Tokyo were promoted to the newly-formed J2 League in 1999, with Suzuki still their first-choice goalkeeper. He performed well as Tokyo finished second, earning promotion to the J1 League in 2000. However, Yoichi Doi took his starting spot, which made him unsatisfied. He retired after the 2000 season.

== Career statistics ==
Appearances and goals by club, season and competition
| Club | Season | League | | | Emperor's Cup | | J.League Cup | | Total | |
| Club | Season | Division | Apps | Goals | Apps | Goals | Apps | Goals | Apps | Goals |
|---|---|---|---|---|---|---|---|---|---|---|
| Tokyo Gas | 1996 | Football League | 5 | 0 | 2 | 0 | — | | 7 | 0 |
| Tokyo Gas | 1997 | Football League | 22 | 0 | 0 | 0 | — | | 22 | 0 |
| Tokyo Gas | 1998 | Football League | 0 | 0 | 0 | 0 | — | | 0 | 0 |
| FC Tokyo | 1999 | J2 League | 21 | 0 | 4 | 0 | 4 | 0 | 29 | 0 |
| FC Tokyo | 2000 | J1 League | 0 | 0 | 0 | 0 | 0 | 0 | 0 | 0 |
| Career total | | | 48 | 0 | 6 | 0 | 4 | 0 | 58 | 0 |
