= Ikko Suzuki =

- 鈴木 一功
- Born: Koichi Suzuki; May 19, 1952 (age 73); Sangenjaya, Tokyo, Japan
- Education: Harajuku School
- Occupation: Actor
- Agent: Wonder Production

Ikko Suzuki (鈴木一功, Suzuki Ikkō; born May 19, 1952, in Sangenjaya, Tokyo, Japan) is a Japanese actor represented by Wonder Production.

== Filmography ==
=== Films ===
Year	Title	Role	Notes
1996	Nippon-sei Shōnen		
1998	Tomie		
2001	Visitor Q		
2002	A Snake of June		
2003	Bayside Shakedown 2	Keiji	
2004	Umeku Haisui-kan	Father	
2004	Vital		
2005	In the Pool		
2007	Yakusoku no Ji ni Saku Hana		

=== TV series ===
Year	Title	Role	Network	Notes
1998	Abarenbō Shogun VIII	Tsumahachi	TV Asahi	Episode 16
2000	Kenkaku Shōbai	Komai	Fuji TV	Series 2 Episode 4
2000	Hagure Keiji Junjō-ha	Keigo Otomo	TV Asahi	
2002	Shinju Fujin		THK	
2006	Itsuwari no Hanazono		THK	
	Mito Kōmon		TBS	
2009	Tenchijin		NHK G	
2009	Otokomae!	Magoroku	NHK G	Series 2 Episode 4
2009	Benten Yumiko Hōritsu Jimusho		TV Asahi	
2011	Onmitsu Happyakuyachō	Jin'uemon	NHK G	Episode 2
2011	Kami-sama no Nyōbō	Omori	NHK	
2012	Keishichō Sōsaikka 9 Kakari Season 7	Makoto Ninomiya	TV Asahi	Episode 3
2014	Toki wa Tachidomaranai		TV Asahi	
2014	Osoroshi: Mishima ya Hen Chō Hyaku Monogatari	Hatsugoro	NHK BS Premium	
2015	Aibō	Tatsuo Itakura	TV Asahi	Season 13 Episode 14
2015	Shokatsu Tamashī		TV Asahi	
2016	Specialist	Asato Furudo	TV Asahi	Episode 7

=== Advertisements ===
Title	Notes
Acom	
