= Visvim =

Japanese menswear brand

visvim
- Industry: Retail
- Founded: 2000
- Founder: Hiroki Nakamura
- Headquarters: Tokyo, Japan
- Key people: Hiroki Nakamura (Creative Director and CEO)
- Products: Men's Apparel
- Website: www.visvim.tv

visvim is a Japanese luxury menswear brand founded by Hiroki Nakamura in 2000. The brand is headquartered in Tokyo, Japan, and has stores in Japan and the US, and is sold internationally at luxury department stores and boutiques including Bergdorf Goodman in New York and Dover Street Market in London.

In addition to the main visvim line, Nakamura designs a womenswear line called WMV, and a conceptual menswear line called F.I.L. Indigo Camping Trailer. He also produces his own range of coffee beans called Little Cloud Coffee.

== Etymology ==
The word “visvim” does not have any meaning. Hiroki Nakamura has said that he liked v-lettered logos, and browsed through the “v” section of a Latin dictionary until he came upon “vis” and “vim” and liked how the two words looked together.

F.I.L., the name of visvim's flagship stores, stands for Free International Laboratory. This stems from Nakamura wanting the stores to be a working laboratory for an international brand.

== History ==
Hiroki Nakamura was born in Kofu, and grew up in Tokyo. Nakamura's parents encouraged him to study abroad. At the age of 11, Nakamura met Cody Horne, one of his classmates at the Bunka High School. Through Horne, Nakamura became interested in foreign cultures. Nakamura chose Alaska, a place he had grown to love on family whale-watching, camping, and snowboarding trips. When he grew older, he started his career at Burton Snowboards in Japan, where he worked as a designer for 8 years. After quitting his job at Burton, Nakamura founded visvim in 2001. visvim started off as primarily a footwear brand, and later expanded into a full apparel collection.

The brand has held fashion shows in Tokyo, Paris, and New York. It encompasses twelve free-standing stores in Japan, three flagship stores in the United States, and is stocked at 135 retailers internationally.

== Production ==
visvim footwear and garments are constructed with a mix of traditional production techniques and modern technology. Past inspirations for visvim products include vintage Americana, Japanese Edo period garments, French workwear, Amish patchwork fabric, Native American clothing, the Alaskan outdoors, and Sami tribe culture. In addition to vintage construction and dyeing techniques, visvim also uses Gore-Tex material for waterproof jackets and replaceable Vibram outsoles.

=== Footwear ===
visvim produces the FBT, a modern interpretation of the Native American moccasin but with a sneaker outsole. It was inspired by moccasins worn by Terry Hall of British band Fun Boy Three. The visvim Christo sandal is inspired by the artist duo of the same name, and features a construction that wraps around the foot similar to Christo's wrapped buildings.

In 2008, Nakamura introduced a new line of footwear called “Folk,” which features mostly leather uppers and no chemical tanning. When the outsoles wear out, they can be replaced with new ones.

=== Denim ===
visvim's denim line is called Social Sculpture. Nakamura developed the denim "from the yarn up" and the process of breaking down the denim and building it back up again gave rise to the image of a sculpture.

=== Natural dye ===
visvim makes many products using natural dyes. These dyes include natural indigo, Amami Ōshima mud dye, sugme dyp dye and cochineal. By using natural dye, which is a bacterium and impossible to completely control, the products feature variation and unevenness, a quality that Nakamura describes as wabi-sabi.

=== Cotton ===
Some of shirts, T-shirts, and sweatshirts in the visvim collection use Sea Island cotton (Gossypium barbadense), an extra long staple cotton.

== Notable clients ==
Thundercat, RM from BTS, Eric Clapton, John Mayer, Kanye West, Rihanna, A$AP Rocky, Mos Def, David Duchovny, Schoolboy Q, Drake, KAWS, Robert Ahearn, Edison Chen, and Shawn Yue have worn visvim. Eric Clapton in particular has stated that he wears nothing but visvim and MTM Loro Piana.
