= Suzuki Masahisa =

Masahisa Suzuki (鈴木 正久, Suzuki Masahisa; August 7, 1912 – July 14, 1969) was a pastor of the Methodist Church in Japan. Masahisa baptized in Japan Chuen Methodist Church by Mitsuoka Kyuuma in February 1929. Later, graduated from the Faculty of Theology Aoyama Gakuin University. After that Masahisa actively serving in the Methodist church and Kamedo Himonya. In addition, Masahisa also chief editor of the newsletter Methodist Japan, in his article critiquing of the Opportunistic nationalism church leaders in Japan and introduced the views of Karl Barth of the German church recognition of the war. In 1941 Masahisa also serve on the agency United Church of Christ in Japan (UCCJ). On Easter 1967 Masahisa as moderator UCCJ raise the issue of recognition of the church against war responsibility. Extraordinary statement stands alone in the history of Christianity. When looking at the future looked back and also in an effort to improve the early days of the war. that requires a critical self-assessment against the real mission as a church in the world. It is challenging herself to do renewal of the mission. Unfortunately, Suzuki Moderator death from cancer and the loss of strong leadership. Kiyoshi li Vice-moderator, Reinanzaka Church in Tokyo, has just replaced him when Kyodan experienced major crises brought on by the prospect of Osaka in 1970 Ezposition.
