= Suzuki Shigeoki =

Leader of the Saika Ikki (1511–1585)

Suzuki Shigeoki (鈴木重意; 1511–1585), better known as Suzuki Sadayū (鈴木佐大夫), was a leader of the Saika Ikki throughout the latter years of the Sengoku period of feudal Japan. He sometimes used the nickname Saika Magoichi.

He is Shigehide and Shigetomo's father (though the former is disputed). Since records regarding the first half of his life are scant, it is speculated that he traveled as a mercenary. He was employed by the Hatakeyama clan and was a major contributor for repelling the Miyoshi clan. His reputation as a fearsome warrior began to spread and he became a kokujin in the area. When the Miyoshi clan were being attacked by Oda Nobunaga in 1570, the Ishiyama Hongan-ji mob assisted the resistance against the conqueror. Shigeoki came to their aid and led 600 riflemen into battle. His efforts won him fame when he injured one of Nobunaga's valued generals, Sassa Narimasa. Kennyo continued to count on Shigeoki's reinforcements. During this time, Nobunaga was said to have called him "Kennyo's left and right-hand man".

During the Battle of Komaki and Nagakute, Shigeoki aided Tokugawa Ieyasu and surrendered to Toyotomi Hideyoshi's vast army after the battle's conclusion. Though he swore to serve Hideyoshi, Tōdō Takatora suspected that keeping a formidable enemy within their ranks was too risky to trust. Therefore, Shigeoki was sentenced to commit suicide. He died when he was 75. His four sons survived him. Their names were Shigekane, Shigehide, Yoshikane, and Shigetomo.
