= United Arrows =

Japanese clothing brand

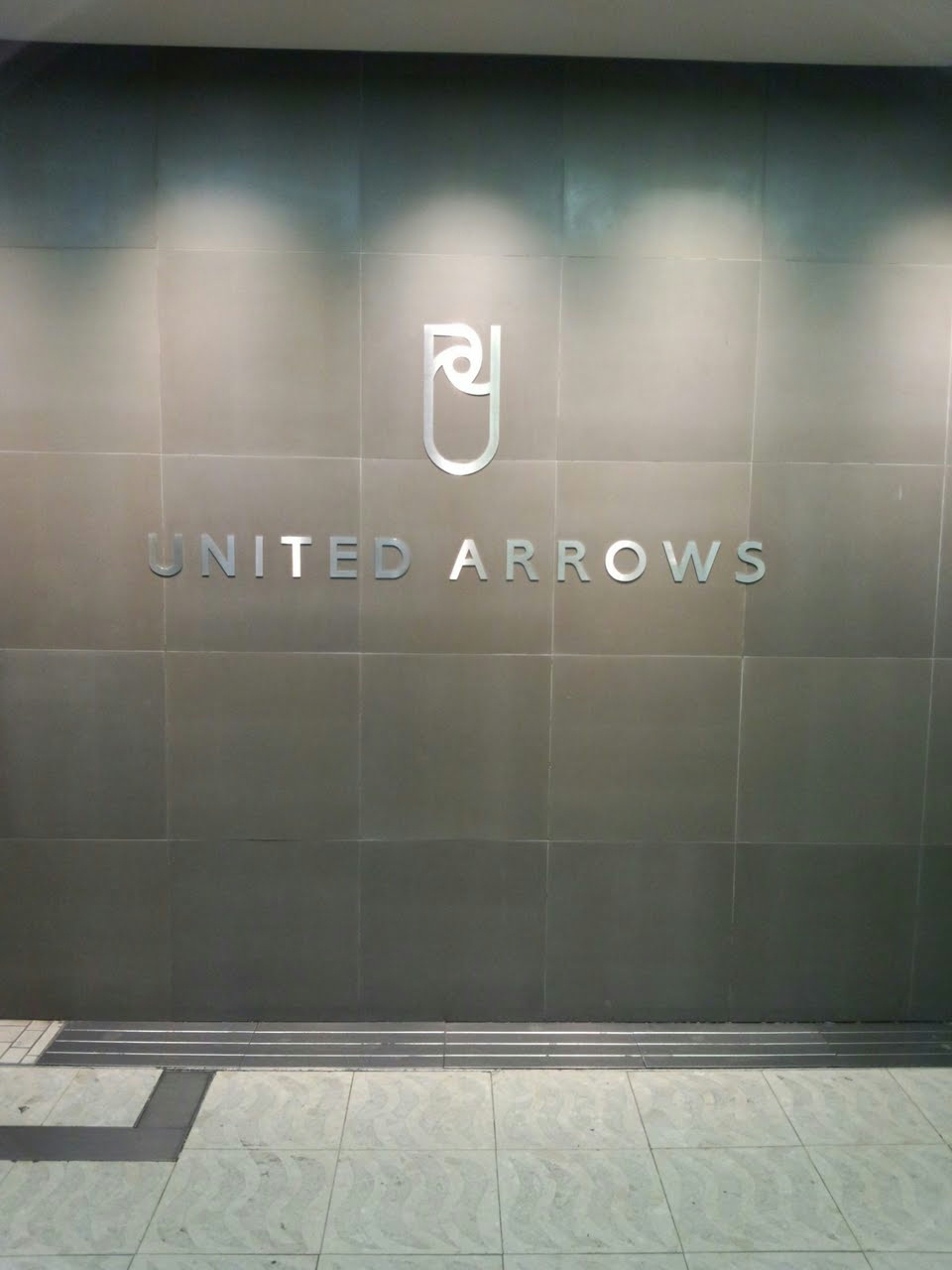
UNITED ARROWS logo

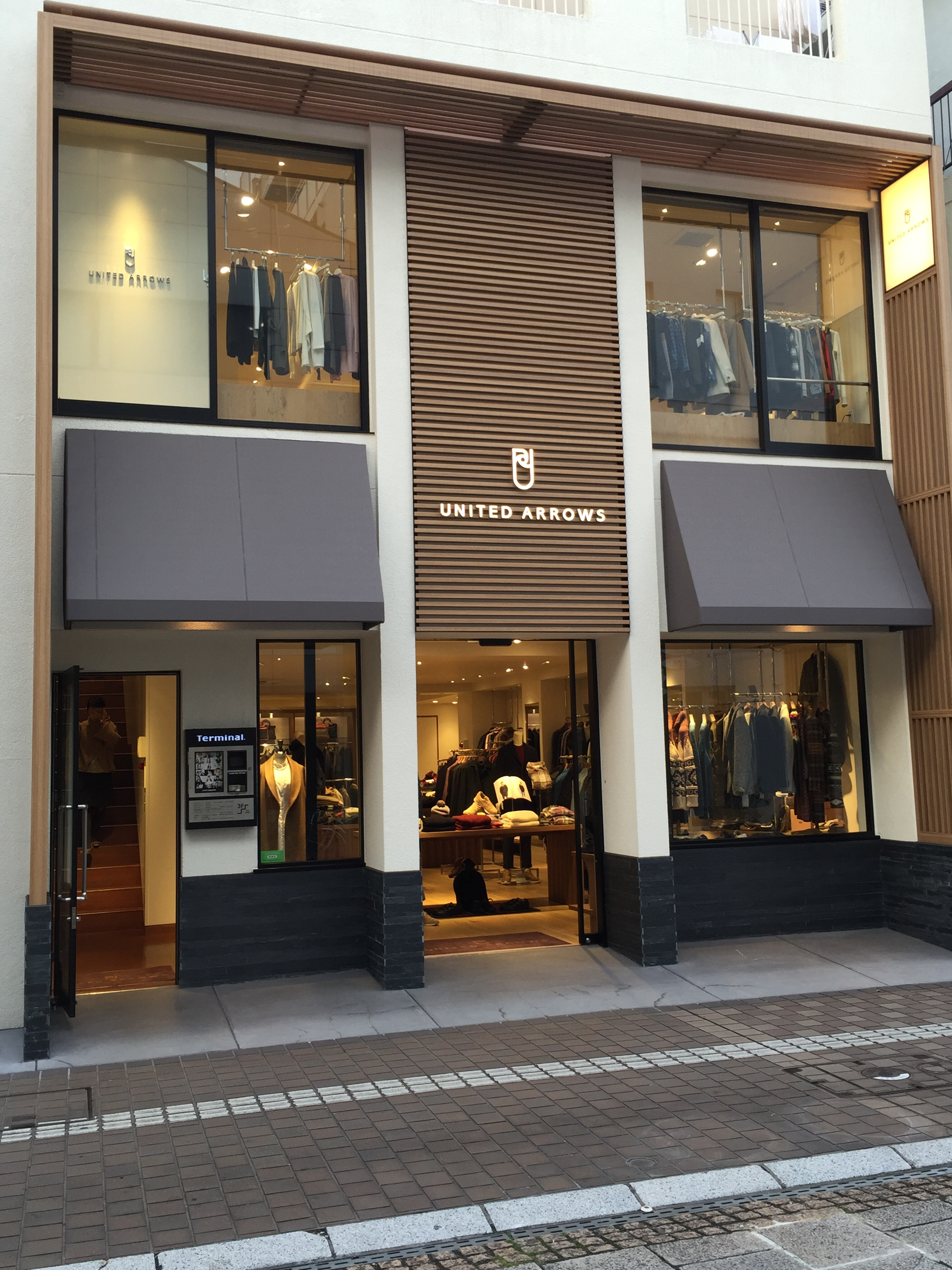
UNITED ARROWS Oita-shi shop

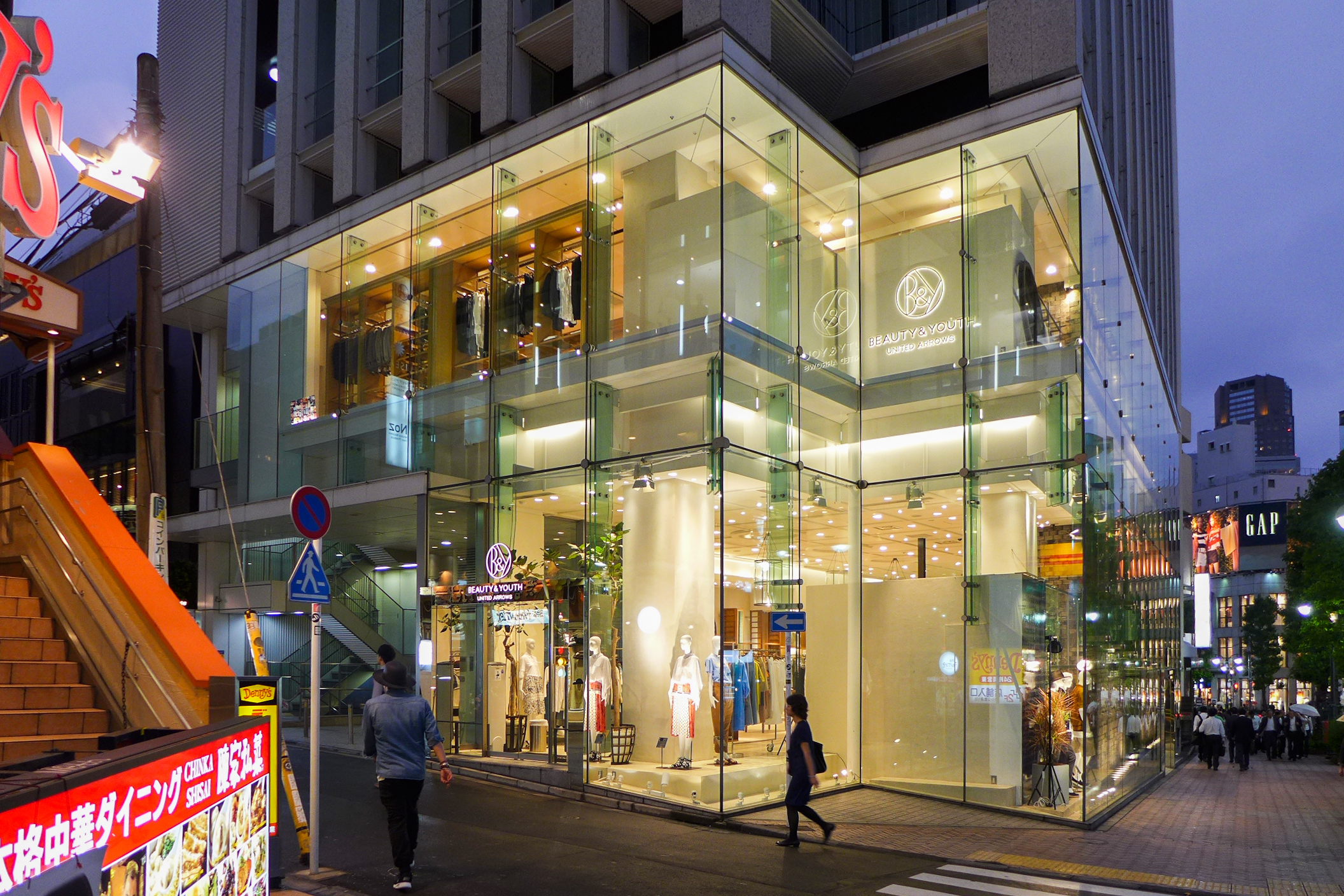
UNITED ARROWS BEAUTY & YOUTH Shibuya

United Arrows is a Japanese clothing brand founded in 1989 by Yasuto Kamoshita, Hirofumi Kurino and Osamu Shigematsu. Its sub-brand Camoshita United Arrows was established in 2007. The brand has collaborated with New Balance, The North Face, Dr. Martens, adidas, HUF, and others.

== See also ==
- Billionaire Boys Club
- Nigo
- Supreme
- A Bathing Ape
- Virgil Abloh
- OVO
- Chrome Hearts
- Opening Ceremony
