= 1999 J.League Cup final =

Kashiwa Reysol	Kashima Antlers
2	2
- Kashiwa Reysol won 5–4 on penalties
- Date: November 3, 1999
- Venue: National Stadium, Tokyo

The 1999 J.League Cup final was the 7th final of the J.League Cup competition. The final was played at National Stadium in Tokyo on November 3, 1999. Kashiwa Reysol won the championship.

== Match details ==
November 3, 1999

Kashiwa Reysol	2–2	Kashima Antlers
Harutaka Ono 5'; Takeshi Watanabe 89'	Report	Bismarck 62'; Toshiyuki Abe 64'
Penalties
	5–4

National Stadium

Kashiwa Reysol
GK	22	(Japan) Motohiro Yoshida
DF	4	(Japan) Takeshi Watanabe
DF	2	(Japan) Shigenori Hagimura
DF	3	(Japan) Norihiro Satsukawa
MF	12	(Japan) Naoki Sakai
MF	5	(Japan) Takahiro Shimotaira
MF	8	(Romania) Badea	(substituted off) 97'
MF	24	(Japan) Tomonori Hirayama	(substituted off) 78'
MF	10	(Japan) Harutaka Ono
FW	9	(Japan) Hideaki Kitajima
FW	11	(Japan) Nozomu Kato
Substitutes:
GK	16	(Japan) Dai Sato
DF	19	(Japan) Toru Irie
MF	15	(Japan) Makoto Sunakawa
MF	13	(Japan) Mitsuteru Watanabe	(substituted on) 97'
FW	26	(Japan) Taro Hasegawa	(substituted on) 78'
Manager:
(Japan) Akira Nishino

Kashima Antlers
GK	21	(Japan) Daijiro Takakuwa
DF	2	(Japan) Akira Narahashi
DF	15	(Japan) Ichiei Muroi
DF	20	(Brazil) Ricardo
DF	7	(Japan) Naoki Soma
MF	6	(Japan) Yasuto Honda
MF	18	(Japan) Koji Kumagai	(substituted off) 45'
MF	16	(Japan) Toshiyuki Abe
MF	10	(Brazil) Bismarck
FW	13	(Japan) Atsushi Yanagisawa	(substituted off) 103'
FW	11	(Japan) Yoshiyuki Hasegawa	(substituted off) 23'
Substitutes:
GK	1	(Japan) Masaaki Furukawa
DF	4	(Japan) Ryosuke Okuno
MF	14	(Japan) Tadatoshi Masuda	(substituted on) 103'
MF	27	(Japan) Mitsuo Ogasawara	(substituted on) 45'
FW	9	(Japan) Takayuki Suzuki	(substituted on) 23'
General Manager:
(Brazil) Zico

== See also ==
- 1999 J.League Cup
