= 1996 Kashiwa Reysol season =

Kashiwa Reysol
1996 season
- Manager: Nicanor
- Stadium: Hitachi Kashiwa Soccer Stadium
- J.League: 5th
- Emperor's Cup: 4th Round
- J.League Cup: Semifinals
- Top goalscorer: League: Edílson (21); All: Edílson (?)
- Highest home attendance: 13,462 (vs Júbilo Iwata, 18 May 1996); 35,926 (vs Urawa Red Diamonds, 21 September 1996, Tokyo National Stadium)
- Lowest home attendance: 6,093 (vs Gamba Osaka, 28 August 1996)
- Average home league attendance: 13,033
Home colours	Away colours

1996 Kashiwa Reysol season

== Review and events ==
=== League results summary ===
Overall								Home						Away					
Pld	W	D	L	GF	GA	GD	Pts	W	D	L	GF	GA	GD	W	D	L	GF	GA	GD
30	20	0	10	67	52	+15	60	9	0	6	31	23	+8	11	0	4	36	29	+7

Source: J.LEAGUE OFFICIAL GUIDE 1997. ISBN 4-09-102329-0.

=== League results by round ===
Round	1	2	3	4	5	6	7	8	9	10	11	12	13	14	15	16	17	18	19	20	21	22	23	24	25	26	27	28	29	30
Ground	A	H	A	H	A	H	A	H	A	A	H	A	H	A	H	H	A	H	A	H	A	H	A	H	A	H	A	H	A	H
Result	L	L	W	L	L	W	L	W	W	W	W	W	W	W	W	W	W	W	W	L	W	L	W	W	L	L	W	W	W	L
Position	9	11	8	13	14	12	12	10	10	7	7	6	6	6	5	5	4	2	2	4	4	5	5	3	6	6	6	5	5	5

Source: J.LEAGUE OFFICIAL GUIDE 1997. ISBN 4-09-102329-0.
A = Away; H = Home; W = Win; D = Draw; L = Loss

== Competitions ==
Competitions	Position
J.League	5th / 16 clubs
Emperor's Cup	4th round
J.League Cup	Semifinals

== Domestic results ==
=== J.League ===
16 March 1996 1	Urawa Red Diamonds	2–1	Kashiwa Reysol	Urawa Komaba Stadium
15:03 JST (UTC+09)	Fukunaga 9', 65'	J. League	Watanabe 24'	Attendance: 20,124; Referee: Naotsugu Fuse; Assistant referees: Kazuaki Hamaguchi, Hisaharu Kitamura; Fourth official: Toshimitsu Yasumoto

20 March 1996 2	Kashiwa Reysol	2–3 (V-goal) (a.e.t.)	Nagoya Grampus Eight	Tokyo National Stadium
15:04 JST (UTC+09)	Edílson 38'; Yokoyama 60'	J. League	Hirano 6'; Stojković 12'; Moriyama 109'	Attendance: 25,948; Referee: Yoshimi Ogawa; Assistant referees: Mitsuru Satō, Naoyuki Mori; Fourth official: Hide Lii

23 March 1996 3	Verdy Kawasaki	2–3 (V-goal) (a.e.t.)	Kashiwa Reysol	Kawasaki Todoroki Stadium
15:03 JST (UTC+09)	11' (o.g.); Bismarck 60'	J. League	Edílson 25'; N. Katō 73'; Yokoyama 94'	Attendance: 11,599; Referee: Tetsuya Hamana; Assistant referees: Kazuya Yanagisawa, Tetsu Karakida; Fourth official: Yasuhiko Koiso

30 March 1996 4	Kashiwa Reysol	0–2	JEF United Ichihara	Hitachi Kashiwa Soccer Stadium
15:01 JST (UTC+09)		J. League	Ejiri 53'; Maslovar 65'	Attendance: 10,272; Referee: Tōru Kamikawa; Assistant referees: Hiroshi Fukuda, Sōichirō Kaneko; Fourth official: Fujirō Masukura

3 April 1996 5	Kashima Antlers	5–1	Kashiwa Reysol	Kashima Soccer Stadium
19:03 JST (UTC+09)	Mazinho 2'; Jorginho 20'; Muroi 33'; Hasegawa 61'; Kurosaki 65'	J. League	Edílson 81'	Attendance: 15,489; Referee: Naotsugu Fuse; Assistant referees: Masahiro Katagiri, Hisaharu Kitamura; Fourth official: Yoshimasa Onoguchi

6 April 1996 6	Kashiwa Reysol	3–0	Cerezo Osaka	Hitachi Kashiwa Soccer Stadium
15:03 JST (UTC+09)	Sugano 19', 89'; N. Katō 49'	J. League		Attendance: 8,790; Referee: Hiroshi Tanabe; Assistant referees: Satoru Ishizawa, Keiji Kamiara; Fourth official: Morio Okamoto

13 April 1996 7	Yokohama Flügels	2–1	Kashiwa Reysol	Kagoshima Kamoike Stadium
13:03 JST (UTC+09)	Evair 18'; Sampaio 74'	J. League	Sawada 57'	Attendance: 8,083; Referee: Shinichirō Obata; Assistant referees: Tōru Yamashiro, Masatoshi Shibata; Fourth official: Shōji Hamada

17 April 1996 8	Kashiwa Reysol	2–1 (V-goal) (a.e.t.)	Shimizu S-Pulse	Hitachi Kashiwa Soccer Stadium
19:00 JST (UTC+09)	N. Katō 80'; Hashiratani 95'	J. League	Sawanobori 77'	Attendance: 9,212; Referee: Archundia; Assistant referees: Kazuhisa Osada, Toshimitsu Yoshida; Fourth official: Misao Kataoka

20 April 1996 9	Sanfrecce Hiroshima	0–1	Kashiwa Reysol	Hiroshima Big Arch
15:03 JST (UTC+09)		J. League	Yokoyama 11'	Attendance: 7,126; Referee: Yasuhiro Hemmi; Assistant referees: Yoshikazu Hiroshima, Hiroyuki Ōnishi; Fourth official: Shinya Sasamoto

27 April 1996 10	Bellmare Hiratsuka	0–1	Kashiwa Reysol	Hiratsuka Stadium
15:01 JST (UTC+09)		J. League	Katanosaka 6'	Attendance: 9,229; Referee: Yasuhiro Matsuzaki; Assistant referees: Ichirō Inukai, Masaaki Shimomura; Fourth official: Michio Nakahara

1 May 1996 11	Kashiwa Reysol	2–0	Kyoto Purple Sanga	Hitachi Kashiwa Soccer Stadium
19:04 JST (UTC+09)	Arima 47'; Wagner 63'	J. League		Attendance: 7,422; Referee: Masayoshi Okada; Assistant referees: Kimio Izaki, Takuji Fukazawa; Fourth official: Masahiko Tsuma

4 May 1996 12	Gamba Osaka	1–7	Kashiwa Reysol	Expo '70 Commemorative Stadium
14:00 JST (UTC+09)	Mladenović 70'	J. League	Edílson 48', 63', 77', 87', 88'; N. Katō 55'; Arima 89'	Attendance: 10,646; Referee: Tōru Kamikawa; Assistant referees: Hideaki Harada, Hiroyuki Izumi; Fourth official: Tsuyoshi Miyake

11 May 1996 13	Kashiwa Reysol	5–2	Avispa Fukuoka	Hitachi Kashiwa Soccer Stadium
14:59 JST (UTC+09)	Edílson 14', 44'; Valdir 39'; Katanosaka 48'; N. Katō 87'	J. League	Endō 83'; Troglio 88'	Attendance: 11,229; Referee: Kenji Tanaka; Assistant referees: Kazuhisa Osada, Akihisa Makino; Fourth official: Kaoru Nagase

15 May 1996 14	Yokohama Marinos	1–2	Kashiwa Reysol	Yokohama Mitsuzawa Football Stadium
19:03 JST (UTC+09)	T. Suzuki 40'	J. League	Edílson 57'; 65' (o.g.)	Attendance: 8,395; Referee: Fumikazu Shioyazono; Assistant referees: Takashi Kunori, Satoru Ishizawa; Fourth official: Hiroshi Yamaguchi

18 May 1996 15	Kashiwa Reysol	4–0	Júbilo Iwata	Hitachi Kashiwa Soccer Stadium
15:03 JST (UTC+09)	Edílson 27', 35', 58'; Watanabe 44'	J. League		Attendance: 13,462; Referee: Hideo Kikuchi; Assistant referees: Kenichi Koshiyama, Kō Ōishi; Fourth official: Terunobu Kakinuma

28 August 1996 16	Kashiwa Reysol	1–0	Gamba Osaka	Hitachi Kashiwa Soccer Stadium
19:00 JST (UTC+09)	Ishikawa 16'	J. League		Attendance: 6,093; Referee: Tetsuya Hamana; Assistant referees: Hiroshi Fukuda, Takao Onshi; Fourth official: Kōji Sugikawa

31 August 1996 17	Avispa Fukuoka	4–5 (V-goal) (a.e.t.)	Kashiwa Reysol	Hakatanomori Football Stadium
18:30 JST (UTC+09)	Mori 5'; Ueno 10'; Troglio 26'; Maradona 65'	J. League	Date 17'; Edílson 37'; Sakai 66', 69'; N. Katō 103'	Attendance: 7,174; Referee: Kiyoshi Ōta; Assistant referees: Toshimitsu Yoshida, Masatoshi Shibata; Fourth official: Daikichi Kanada

7 September 1996 18	Kashiwa Reysol	4–0	Yokohama Marinos	Niigata Stadium
18:30 JST (UTC+09)	Yoshida 16'; Sakai 41'; 73' (o.g.); Wagner 88'	J. League		Attendance: 11,883; Referee: Leslie Mottram; Assistant referees: Mitsuru Satō, Masaaki Shimomura; Fourth official: Hiroshi Abe

14 September 1996 19	Júbilo Iwata	2–3 (V-goal) (a.e.t.)	Kashiwa Reysol	Júbilo Iwata Stadium
19:00 JST (UTC+09)	Schillaci 35'; Hattori 72'	J. League	Sakai 26'; Edílson 85' 108'	Attendance: 13,163; Referee: Fumikazu Shioyazono; Assistant referees: Kazuaki Hamaguchi, Naoyuki Mori; Fourth official: Tōru Nagata

21 September 1996 20	Kashiwa Reysol	0–7	Urawa Red Diamonds	Tokyo National Stadium
15:04 JST (UTC+09)		J. League	Ōshiba 2'; Okano 21'; Boli 44'; Fukunaga 47', 65'; Buchwald 84' (pen.); Iwase 87'	Attendance: 35,926; Referee: Leslie Mottram; Assistant referees: Hiroshi Fukuda, Hisaharu Kitamura; Fourth official: Hide Lii

28 September 1996 21	Nagoya Grampus Eight	1–2 (V-goal) (a.e.t.)	Kashiwa Reysol	Nagoya Mizuho Athletics Stadium
15:03 JST (UTC+09)	Moriyama 80'	J. League	N. Katō 44'; Katanosaka 93'	Attendance: 21,295; Referee: Hiroyuki Umemoto; Assistant referees: Naoki Esumi, Susumu Takeda; Fourth official: Yukiyoshi Miyashita

2 October 1996 22	Kashiwa Reysol	1–2 (V-goal) (a.e.t.)	Verdy Kawasaki	Hitachi Kashiwa Soccer Stadium
19:03 JST (UTC+09)	Valdir 9'	J. League	K. Miura 31'; Magrão 117'	Attendance: 10,654; Referee: Yasuhiro Matsuzaki; Assistant referees: Kimio Izaki, Kenichi Koshiyama; Fourth official: Eiji Kawai

5 October 1996 23	JEF United Ichihara	2–3	Kashiwa Reysol	Ichihara Stadium
15:03 JST (UTC+09)	Hašek 9'; Nakanishi 40'	J. League	Hashiratani 51'; Sakai 52', 53'	Attendance: 8,600; Referee: Tatsumi Ōno; Assistant referees: Satoru Ishizawa, Masaaki Shimomura; Fourth official: Eita Horikawa

16 October 1996 24	Kashiwa Reysol	1–0	Kashima Antlers	Hitachi Kashiwa Soccer Stadium
19:04 JST (UTC+09)	Sakai 11'	J. League		Attendance: 12,256; Referee: Bemard Saules; Assistant referees: Kō Ōishi, Susumu Takeda; Fourth official: Terunobu Kakinuma

19 October 1996 25	Cerezo Osaka	5–1	Kashiwa Reysol	Osaka Nagai Stadium
15:03 JST (UTC+09)	Yonekura 36'; Koga 41'; Yokoyama 58', 64'; Narcizio 72'	J. League	N. Katō 71'	Attendance: 11,118; Referee: Leslie Mottram; Assistant referees: Akio Okutani, Takashi Aoki; Fourth official: Tsuyoshi Miyake

26 October 1996 26	Kashiwa Reysol	1–2	Yokohama Flügels	Hitachi Kashiwa Soccer Stadium
15:00 JST (UTC+09)	52' (o.g.)	J. League	Miura 21'; Evair 61'	Attendance: 13,181; Referee: Zoran Petrović; Assistant referees: Hiroshi Fukuda, Keiji Kamiara; Fourth official: Tatsuya Sakata

30 October 1996 27	Shimizu S-Pulse	2–4	Kashiwa Reysol	Nihondaira Sports Stadium
18:59 JST (UTC+09)	Mukōjima 50', 89'	J. League	Watanabe 1'; Careca 5'; Sakai 64'; Edílson 87'	Attendance: 10,237; Referee: Bemard Saules; Assistant referees: Kōji Taniuchi, Takayoshi Kashino; Fourth official: Naoki Uchiyama

2 November 1996 28	Kashiwa Reysol	3–0	Sanfrecce Hiroshima	Hitachi Kashiwa Soccer Stadium
14:59 JST (UTC+09)	Valdir 37'; Edílson 57', 83'	J. League		Attendance: 7,035; Referee: Naotsugu Fuse; Assistant referees: Kazuaki Hamaguchi, Masahiro Katagiri; Fourth official: Kōji Sugikawa

6 November 1996 29	Kyoto Purple Sanga	0–1	Kashiwa Reysol	Kyoto Nishikyogoku Stadium
19:04 JST (UTC+09)		J. League	Edílson 10'	Attendance: 6,310; Referee: Yoshitsugu Katayama; Assistant referees: Satoru Ishizawa, Hiroyuki Ōnishi; Fourth official: Mitsuyoshi Nakaguma

9 November 1996 30	Kashiwa Reysol	2–4	Bellmare Hiratsuka	Hitachi Kashiwa Soccer Stadium
14:30 JST (UTC+09)	Careca 76'; Date 85'	J. League	47' (o.g.); T. Iwamoto 48'; Betinho 58', 74'	Attendance: 12,126; Referee: Bemard Saules; Assistant referees: Yū Nakamura, Takao Onshi; Fourth official: Fujirō Masukura

=== Emperor's Cup ===
1st Round	bye

2nd Round	bye

17 November 1996 3rd Round	Kashiwa Reysol	1–0	Kokushikan University	Hitachi Kashiwa Soccer Stadium
: JST (UTC+09)	? ?'

23 December 1996 4th Round	Kashiwa Reysol	1–2	Sanfrecce Hiroshima	Hiroshima Stadium
: JST (UTC+09)	? ?'		? ?' ? ?'

=== J.League Cup ===
1 June 1996 GL-A-1-1	Urawa Red Diamonds	1–3	Kashiwa Reysol	Urawa Komaba Stadium
18:33 JST (UTC+09)	Fukunaga 89'	J. League	Watanabe 32'; 60' (o.g.); Edílson 68'	Attendance: 20,230; Referee: Tatsumi Ōno; Assistant referees: Toshiyuki Mayuzumi, Keiji Kamiara; Fourth official: Akio Hayashi

5 June 1996 GL-A-1-2	Kashiwa Reysol	2–0 (5–1 agg.)	Urawa Red Diamonds	Hitachi Kashiwa Soccer Stadium
19:00 JST (UTC+09)	N. Katō 42'; Edílson 63'	J. League		Attendance: 9,348; Referee: Zoran Petrović; Assistant referees: Yū Nakamura, Masaaki Shimomura; Fourth official: Fujirō Masukura

8 June 1996 GL-A-2-1	Kashiwa Reysol	0–0	Yokohama Marinos	Hitachi Kashiwa Soccer Stadium
18:31 JST (UTC+09)		J. League		Attendance: 12,768; Referee: Shinichirō Obata; Assistant referees: Hisaharu Kitamura, Ichirō Inukai; Fourth official: Eiji Kawai

12 June 1996 GL-A-2-2	Yokohama Marinos	3–1 (3–1 agg.)	Kashiwa Reysol	Yokohama Mitsuzawa Football Stadium
19:00 JST (UTC+09)	Miura 9'; Matsuda 44'; Bisconti 50'	J. League	Edílson 75'	Attendance: 8,280; Referee: Kenji Tanaka; Assistant referees: Tōru Yamashiro, Naoki Esumi; Fourth official: Kazuhiko Uchida

15 June 1996 GL-A-3-1	Kashiwa Reysol	2–1	Júbilo Iwata	Hitachi Kashiwa Soccer Stadium
18:30 JST (UTC+09)	Wagner 24'; Sakai 87'	J. League	Schillaci 65'	Attendance: 11,276; Referee: Kiyoshi Ōta; Assistant referees: Kōji Taniuchi, Masahiro Katagiri; Fourth official: Morio Fujita

19 June 1996 GL-A-3-2	Júbilo Iwata	1–1 (2–3 agg.)	Kashiwa Reysol	Júbilo Iwata Stadium
19:02 JST (UTC+09)	Katsuya 64'	J. League	Careca 36'	Attendance: 9,160; Referee: Yasuhiro Hemmi; Assistant referees: Toshimitsu Yoshida, Takuji Fukazawa; Fourth official: Tōru Nagata

22 June 1996 GL-A-4-1	Kashiwa Reysol	1–2	Sanfrecce Hiroshima	Hitachi Kashiwa Soccer Stadium
18:30 JST (UTC+09)	29' (o.g.)	J. League	Huistra 21'; Kuwabara 68'	Attendance: 8,003; Referee: Piotr Werner; Assistant referees: Morihisa Yamaguchi, Takashi Aoki; Fourth official: Yoshiyuki Yamashita

26 June 1996 GL-A-4-2	Sanfrecce Hiroshima	1–3 (3–4 agg.)	Kashiwa Reysol	Hiroshima Stadium
19:00 JST (UTC+09)	Ōki 2'	J. League	Careca 39', 44'; Shimotaira 50'	Attendance: 4,603; Referee: Hiroshi Tanabe; Assistant referees: Naoki Esumi, Masatoshi Shibata; Fourth official: Yutaka Miyake

29 June 1996 GL-A-5-1	Gamba Osaka	1–4	Kashiwa Reysol	Expo '70 Commemorative Stadium
19:00 JST (UTC+09)	Gillhaus 41'	J. League	Date 38'; Valdir 62'; Arima 66'; N. Katō 85'	Attendance: 5,323; Referee: Piotr Werner; Assistant referees: Naoyuki Mori, Hiroyuki Ōnishi; Fourth official: Sōichirō Kaneko

3 July 1996 GL-A-5-2	Kashiwa Reysol	2–0 (6–1 agg.)	Gamba Osaka	Hitachi Kashiwa Soccer Stadium
19:00 JST (UTC+09)	Watanabe 22'; Edílson 53'	J. League		Attendance: 6,062; Referee: Yoshimi Ogawa; Assistant referees: Tetsu Karakida, Akihisa Makino; Fourth official: Katsuhiko Takayama

10 August 1996 GL-A-6-1	Kashiwa Reysol	3–1	Kyoto Purple Sanga	Hitachi Kashiwa Soccer Stadium
18:34 JST (UTC+09)	Sakai 70'; Hashiratani 79'; Edílson 89'	J. League	Y. Satō 30'	Attendance: 10,004; Referee: Zoran Petrović; Assistant referees: Yū Nakamura, Keiji Kamiara; Fourth official: Fujirō Masukura

24 August 1996 GL-A-6-2	Kyoto Purple Sanga	0–0 (1–3 agg.)	Kashiwa Reysol	Expo '70 Commemorative Stadium
18:31 JST (UTC+09)		J. League		Attendance: 2,387; Referee: Lim Kee Chong; Assistant referees: Tōru Yamashiro, Masatoshi Shibata; Fourth official: Hiroyuki Ishida

17 August 1996 GL-A-7-1	Bellmare Hiratsuka	3–1	Kashiwa Reysol	Hiratsuka Stadium
18:31 JST (UTC+09)	Nakata 12'; Seki 35'; Narahashi 63'	J. League	Edílson 82'	Attendance: 8,070; Referee: Bemard Saules; Assistant referees: Mitsuru Satō, Naoyuki Mori; Fourth official: Takeshi Ōgiya

21 August 1996 GL-A-7-2	Kashiwa Reysol	1–2 (2–5 agg.)	Bellmare Hiratsuka	Hitachi Kashiwa Soccer Stadium
19:00 JST (UTC+09)	Sakai 7'	J. League	Seki 44'; Noguchi 60'	Attendance: 7,572; Referee: Zoran Petrović; Assistant referees: Kazuhisa Osada, Hitoshi Nakagomi; Fourth official: Eita Horikawa

4 September 1996 Semifinals	Kashiwa Reysol	1–2	Verdy Kawasaki	Tokyo National Stadium
19:01 JST (UTC+09)	Arima 59'	J. League	Argel 11'; Magrão 45'	Attendance: 14,155; Referee: Bemard Saules; Assistant referees: Noboru Ishiyama, Yū Nakamura; Fourth official: Yasuhiro Matsuzaki

== Player statistics ==
Pos.	Nat.	Player	D.o.B. (Age)	Height / Weight	J.League		Emperor's Cup		J.League Cup		Total	
Pos.	Nat.	Player	D.o.B. (Age)	Height / Weight	Apps	Goals	Apps	Goals	Apps	Goals	Apps	Goals
FW	(Brazil)	Careca	October 5, 1960 (aged 35)	179 cm / 75 kg	5	2	0	0	6	3	11	5
FW	(Japan)	Kōichi Hashiratani	March 1, 1961 (aged 35)	178 cm / 75 kg	25	2	1	0	13	1	39	3
MF	(Brazil)	Valdir	October 25, 1965 (aged 30)	172 cm / 66 kg	17	3	2	0	13	1	32	4
FW	(Brazil)	Wagner	June 2, 1966 (aged 29)	174 cm / 68 kg	6	2	0	0	5	1	11	3
DF	(Japan)	Michihisa Date	August 22, 1966 (aged 29)	180 cm / 74 kg	19	2	1	0	12	1	32	3
DF	(Japan)	Kenji Ōba	August 14, 1967 (aged 28)	174 cm / 66 kg	4	0	0	0	11	0	15	0
DF	(Brazil)	Antônio	May 18, 1969 (aged 26)	187 cm / 78 kg	24	0	2	0	5	0	31	0
MF	(Japan)	Yūji Yokoyama	July 6, 1969 (aged 26)	177 cm / 70 kg	15	3	2	1	3	0	20	4
MF	(Japan)	Shin Tanada	July 25, 1969 (aged 26)	165 cm / 58 kg	2	0	2	0	0	0	4	0
MF	(Japan)	Nozomu Katō	October 7, 1969 (aged 26)	170 cm / 62 kg	27	8	2	0	14	2	43	10
GK	(Japan)	Ryūji Katō	December 24, 1969 (aged 26)	184 cm / 78 kg	1	0	0	0	0	0	1	0
DF	(Japan)	Kentarō Ishikawa	February 12, 1970 (aged 26)	181 cm / 72 kg	2	1	0	0	6	0	8	1
DF	(Japan)	Kentarō Sawada	May 15, 1970 (aged 25)	170 cm / 62 kg	23	1	2	0	4	0	29	1
FW	(Brazil)	Edílson	September 17, 1970 (aged 25)	167 cm / 60 kg	29	21	1	0	14	6	44	27
DF	(Japan)	Tomohiro Katanosaka	April 18, 1971 (aged 24)	172 cm / 70 kg	25	3	2	0	12	0	39	3
DF	(Japan)	Nobutaka Tanaka	June 10, 1971 (aged 24)	182 cm / 75 kg	0	0		0	0	0		0
FW	(Japan)	Kenichi Sugano	August 8, 1971 (aged 24)	170 cm / 65 kg	9	2	0	0	4	0	13	2
GK	(Japan)	Dai Satō	August 16, 1971 (aged 24)	190 cm / 85 kg	0	0		0	0	0		0
MF	(Japan)	Takahiro Shimotaira	December 18, 1971 (aged 24)	174 cm / 67 kg	28	0	2	0	14	1	44	1
MF	(Japan)	Satoshi Ōishi	June 26, 1972 (aged 23)	170 cm / 70 kg	2	0	0	0	1	0	3	0
DF	(Japan)	Takeshi Watanabe	September 10, 1972 (aged 23)	181 cm / 76 kg	29	3	1	0	14	2	44	5
FW	(Japan)	Kenji Arima	November 26, 1972 (aged 23)	180 cm / 70 kg	8	2	2	0	8	2	18	4
GK	(Japan)	Yōichi Doi	July 25, 1973 (aged 22)	183 cm / 77 kg	30	0	2	0	15	0	47	0
MF	(Japan)	Takashi Kojima	August 4, 1973 (aged 22)	177 cm / 67 kg	3	0	0	0	2	0	5	0
MF	(Japan)	Tatsuma Yoshida	June 9, 1974 (aged 21)	174 cm / 64 kg	4	1	0	0	1	0	5	1
MF	(Japan)	Naoki Sakai	August 2, 1975 (aged 20)	175 cm / 63 kg	19	8	1	1	12	3	32	12
MF	(Japan)	Yoshikazu Kawashima	August 8, 1975 (aged 20)	169 cm / 64 kg	0	0		0	0	0		0
FW	(Japan)	Hiroaki Hotta	July 26, 1975 (aged 20)	172 cm / 65 kg	0	0		0	0	0		0
MF	(Japan)	Kazumasa Nabeta	August 22, 1975 (aged 20)	166 cm / 61 kg	0	0		0	0	0		0
DF	(Japan)	Tōru Irie	July 8, 1977 (aged 18)	177 cm / 65 kg	0	0		0	0	0		0
DF	(Japan)	Takumi Morikawa	July 11, 1977 (aged 18)	171 cm / 67 kg	2	0	0	0	3	0	5	0
MF	(Japan)	Makoto Sunakawa	August 10, 1977 (aged 18)	171 cm / 67 kg	0	0	0	0	1	0	1	0
DF	(Japan)	Kensuke Nebiki	September 7, 1977 (aged 18)	183 cm / 69 kg	0	0		0	0	0		0
FW	(Japan)	Tomonori Hirayama	January 9, 1978 (aged 18)	173 cm / 64 kg	0	0	0	0	2	0	2	0
GK	(Japan)	Takeaki Yuhara	January 13, 1978 (aged 18)	183 cm / 70 kg	0	0		0	0	0		0
MF	(Japan)	Tomokazu Myōjin	January 24, 1978 (aged 18)	173 cm / 66 kg	11	0	0	0	2	0	13	0

- † player(s) joined the team after the opening of this season.

== Transfers ==
In:

No.	Pos.	Nation	Player
—	GK	JPN	Takeaki Yuhara (from Kashiwa Reysol youth)
—	DF	BRA	Antônio Carlos Zago (from Palmeiras)
—	DF	JPN	Tōru Irie (from Shizuoka Kita High School)
—	DF	JPN	Takumi Morikawa (from Shizuoka Gakuen Senior High School)
—	DF	JPN	Kensuke Nebiki (from Kashiwa Reysol youth)
—	MF	JPN	Makoto Sunakawa (from Funabashi municipal High School)
—	MF	JPN	Tomokazu Myōjin (from Kashiwa Reysol youth)
—	FW	BRA	Antonio Wagner de Moraes (from Vortis Tokushima)
—	FW	BRA	Edílson da Silva Ferreira (from Palmeiras)
—	FW	JPN	Hiroaki Hotta (from Tohoku High School)
—	FW	JPN	Tomonori Hirayama (from Shizuoka Kita High School)

Out:

No.	Pos.	Nation	Player
—	GK	JPN	Hirokazu Gōshi (retired)
—	GK	JPN	Osamu Chiba (to Brummel Sendai)
—	DF	JPN	Tomoyuki Kajino (retired)
—	DF	BRA	Nelsinho
—	DF	JPN	Satoshi Kumanomidō (to NEC Yamagata)
—	DF	JPN	Kazuhisa Irii (to Brummel Sendai)
—	DF	JPN	Dai Kanō (retired)
—	MF	JPN	Takeshi Hoshi (to Brummel Sendai)
—	MF	JPN	Yūji Ōkuma (to Kyoto Purple Sanga)
—	MF	BRA	Caio
—	FW	JPN	Shinichirō Tani (retired)
—	FW	JPN	Satoshi Ōkura (to Júbilo Iwata)
—	FW	JPN	Shūji Kusano (to Brummel Sendai)
—	FW	JPN	Toshiyuki Nakagawa
—	FW	JPN	Kōichi Hashimoto
—	FW	BRA	Bentinho

== Transfers during the season ==
=== Out ===
- (Japan) Kensuke Nebiki (loan to Independiente)

== Awards ==
none

== Other pages ==
- (in Japanese) J. League official site
- (in Japanese) Kashiwa Reysol official site
