= Kentaro Ishikawa =

Japanese footballer

Kentaro Ishikawa 石川 健太郎
Personal information
- Full name: Kentaro Ishikawa
- Date of birth: February 12, 1970 (age 56)
- Place of birth: Chiba, Japan
- Height: 1.81 m (5 ft 11 1/2 in)
- Position: Defender

Youth career
- Gyosei High School
- Kokushikan University

Senior career*
Years	Team	Apps	(Gls)
1993–1998	Kashiwa Reysol		
Total		58	(3)
- * Club domestic league appearances and goals

Kentaro Ishikawa (石川 健太郎, Ishikawa Kentaro; born February 12, 1970) is a former Japanese football player.

== Playing career ==
Ishikawa was born in Chiba Prefecture on February 12, 1970. After graduating from Kokushikan University, he joined his local club Kashiwa Reysol in 1993. He played many positions: center back, side back, and defensive midfielder. In 1994, he played as a regular player and the club won second place and was promoted to the J1 League in 1995. Although he lost his regular position to newcomer Takeshi Watanabe in 1995, he played often in many positions. He retired at the end of the 1998 season.

== Career statistics ==
Appearances and goals by club, season and competition
Club	Season	League			Emperor's Cup		J.League Cup		Total	
Club	Season	Division	Apps	Goals	Apps	Goals	Apps	Goals	Apps	Goals
Kashiwa Reysol	1993	Football League	1	0			2	0	3	0
Kashiwa Reysol	1994	Football League	24	0			1	0	25	0
Kashiwa Reysol	1995	J1 League	17	1	0	0	—		17	1
Kashiwa Reysol	1996	J1 League	2	1	0	0	6	0	8	1
Kashiwa Reysol	1997	J1 League	12	1	1	0	5	0	18	1
Kashiwa Reysol	1998	J1 League	2	0			0	0	2	0
Career total			58	3	1	0	14	0	73	3
