= Yuta Minami =

Japanese footballer (born 1979)

Yuta Minami 南 雄太
Personal information
- Full name: Yuta Minami
- Date of birth: 30 September 1979 (age 47)
- Place of birth: Kawasaki, Kanagawa, Japan
- Height: 1.85 m (6 ft 1 in)
- Position: Goalkeeper

Youth career
- 1995–1997: Shizuoka Gakuen High School

Senior career*
Years	Team	Apps	(Gls)
1998–2009	Kashiwa Reysol	291	(0)
2010–2013	Roasso Kumamoto	155	(0)
2014–2021	Yokohama FC	175	(0)
2021	→ Omiya Ardija (loan)	19	(0)
2022–2023	Omiya Ardija	0	(0)

International career
1997–1999	Japan U-20	11	(0)
Medal record
Kashiwa Reysol
Winner	J.League Cup	1999
Runner-up	Emperor's Cup	2008
Representing Japan
FIFA U-20 World Cup
Silver medal – second place	1999 Nigeria
- * Club domestic league appearances and goals as of 5 December 2021

Yuta Minami (南 雄太, Minami Yūta; born 30 September 1979) is a Japanese football player who plays for Omiya Ardija.

== Club career ==
Minami was born in Kawasaki on 30 September 1979. After graduating from Shizuoka Gakuen High School, he joined J1 League club Kashiwa Reysol in 1998. He played as regular goalkeeper instead Yoichi Doi from summer in first season. He battles with Minami for the position with Motohiro Yoshida from 1999 and Reysol won the 3rd place in 1999 and 2000 J1 League. Minami completely became a regular goalkeeper from 2001. However, the club results were sluggish from 2002 and was relegated to J2 League end of 2005 season. In 2006 season, Reysol won the 2nd place and returned to J1 from 2007. Although he played as regular goalkeeper from 2007, his opportunity to play decreased behind new player Takanori Sugeno from 2008. In 2009, he could not play at all in the match in J1 League and Reysol was relegated to J2 again.

In 2010, Minami moved to J2 club Roasso Kumamoto. He played as regular goalkeeper for 4 seasons until 2013 season. In 2014, he moved to J2 club Yokohama FC.

== National team career ==
In June 1997, when Minami was a Shizuoka Gakuen High School student, he was selected Japan U-20 national team for 1997 World Youth Championship and he played 4 matches. In April 1999, he was selected U-20 Japan for 1999 World Youth Championship second time. At this tournament, he played full time in all 7 matches and Japan won the 2nd place.

== Mistake ==
Minami scored an own goal against Sanfrecce Hiroshima in a J. League match on 22 May 2004. He had gathered the ball and originally planned to throw the ball at first, but he paused and lost control, hurling the ball back into the net to the disbelief of his Kashiwa teammates. The goal wouldn't matter, as Kashiwa lost 3-0.

== Career statistics ==
As of end of 2018 season

Appearances and goals by club, season and competition
Club	Season	League			Emperor's Cup		J.League Cup		Total	
Club	Season	Division	Apps	Goals	Apps	Goals	Apps	Goals	Apps	Goals
Kashiwa Reysol	1998	J1 League	22	0	1	0	4	0	27	0
Kashiwa Reysol	1999	J1 League	18	0	4	0	2	0	24	0
Kashiwa Reysol	2000	J1 League	20	0	2	0	0	0	22	0
Kashiwa Reysol	2001	J1 League	29	0	1	0	4	0	34	0
Kashiwa Reysol	2002	J1 League	27	0	1	0	7	0	35	0
Kashiwa Reysol	2003	J1 League	26	0	0	0	3	0	29	0
Kashiwa Reysol	2004	J1 League	28	0	0	0	4	0	32	0
Kashiwa Reysol	2005	J1 League	33	0	1	0	5	0	39	0
Kashiwa Reysol	2006	J2 League	45	0	0	0	—		45	0
Kashiwa Reysol	2007	J1 League	33	0	0	0	2	0	35	0
Kashiwa Reysol	2008	J1 League	10	0	1	0	1	0	12	0
Kashiwa Reysol	2009	J1 League	0	0	0	0	3	0	3	0
Kashiwa Reysol	Total		291	0	11	0	35	0	337	0
Roasso Kumamoto	2010	J2 League	36	0	2	0	—		38	0
Roasso Kumamoto	2011	J2 League	38	0	0	0	—		38	0
Roasso Kumamoto	2012	J2 League	39	0	2	0	—		41	0
Roasso Kumamoto	2013	J2 League	42	0	0	0	—		42	0
Roasso Kumamoto	Total		155	0	4	0	—		159	0
Yokohama FC	2014	J2 League	39	0	1	0	—		40	0
Yokohama FC	2015	J2 League	42	0	2	0	—		44	0
Yokohama FC	2016	J2 League	23	0	0	0	—		23	0
Yokohama FC	2017	J2 League	1	0	0	0	—		1	0
Yokohama FC	2018	J2 League	25	0	1	0	—		26	0
Yokohama FC	2019	J2 League					—			
Yokohama FC	Total		130	0	4	0	—		134	0
Career total			576	0	19	0	35	0	630	0

== Honors and awards ==
- FIFA World Youth Championship runner-up: 1999
