= 2004 Kashiwa Reysol season =

Kashiwa Reysol
2004 season
- Manager: Tomoyoshi Ikeya; Hiroshi Hayano
- Stadium: Hitachi Kashiwa Soccer Stadium
- J. League 1: 16th
- Emperor's Cup: 4th Round
- J. League Cup: GL-D 3rd
- Top goalscorer: Keiji Tamada (10)
Home colours	Away colours

During the 2004 season, Kashiwa Reysol competed in the J. League 1, in which they finished 16th.

== Competitions ==
Competitions	Position
J. League 1	16th / 16 clubs
Emperor's Cup	4th Round
J. League Cup	GL-D 3rd / 4 clubs

== Domestic results ==
=== J. League 1 ===
Match	Date	Venue	Opponents	Score
1-1	2004.3.13	Hitachi Kashiwa Soccer Stadium	Oita Trinita	2-1
1-2	2004.3.21	Ajinomoto Stadium	Tokyo Verdy 1969	0-1
1-3	2004.4.4	Kashiwanoha Stadium	Albirex Niigata	1-2
1-4	2004.4.11	Toyota Stadium	Nagoya Grampus Eight	1-0
1-5	2004.4.14	Hitachi Kashiwa Soccer Stadium	Júbilo Iwata	1-3
1-6	2004.4.17	Kobe Wing Stadium	Vissel Kobe	2-0
1-7	2004.5.2	Ichihara Seaside Stadium	JEF United Ichihara	1-1
1-8	2004.5.5	Hitachi Kashiwa Soccer Stadium	Gamba Osaka	0-2
1-9	2004.5.9	National Stadium	FC Tokyo	2-1
1-10	2004.5.15	National Stadium	Kashima Antlers	0-1
1-11	2004.5.22	Hiroshima Big Arch	Sanfrecce Hiroshima	3-0
1-12	2004.6.12	Hitachi Kashiwa Soccer Stadium	Shimizu S-Pulse	0-0
1-13	2004.6.16	Urawa Komaba Stadium	Urawa Red Diamonds	1-1
1-14	2004.6.19	Kashiwanoha Stadium	Yokohama F. Marinos	1-2
1-15	2004.6.26	Nagai Stadium	Cerezo Osaka	1-5
2-1	2004.8.14	Kashima Soccer Stadium	Kashima Antlers	1-0
2-2	2004.8.21	Hitachi Kashiwa Soccer Stadium	Vissel Kobe	0-3
2-3	2004.8.29	Hitachi Kashiwa Soccer Stadium	Sanfrecce Hiroshima	2-2
2-4	2004.9.11	Osaka Expo '70 Stadium	Gamba Osaka	5-1
2-5	2004.9.19	Kashiwanoha Stadium	FC Tokyo	1-1
2-6	2004.9.23	Yamaha Stadium	Júbilo Iwata	1-1
2-7	2004.9.26	Hitachi Kashiwa Soccer Stadium	JEF United Ichihara	0-0
2-8	2004.10.3	International Stadium Yokohama	Yokohama F. Marinos	0-1
2-9	2004.10.17	Hitachi Kashiwa Soccer Stadium	Nagoya Grampus Eight	2-2
2-10	2004.10.23	Hitachi Kashiwa Soccer Stadium	Cerezo Osaka	1-1
2-12	2004.11.6	Hitachi Kashiwa Soccer Stadium	Tokyo Verdy 1969	0-2
2-11	2004.11.10	National Stadium	Albirex Niigata	1-3
2-13	2004.11.20	Nihondaira Sports Stadium	Shimizu S-Pulse	2-1
2-14	2004.11.23	Hitachi Kashiwa Soccer Stadium	Urawa Red Diamonds	0-4
2-15	2004.11.28	Oita Stadium	Oita Trinita	2-2

=== Emperor's Cup ===
Match	Date	Venue	Opponents	Score
4th Round	2004.11.13	Hitachi Kashiwa Soccer Stadium	Gunma Horikoshi	0-1

=== J. League Cup ===
Match	Date	Venue	Opponents	Score
GL-D-1	2004.3.27	Kobe Wing Stadium	Vissel Kobe	1-0
GL-D-2	2004.4.29	Hitachi Kashiwa Soccer Stadium	Vissel Kobe	1-1
GL-D-3	2004.5.29	Kashiwanoha Stadium	FC Tokyo	0-2
GL-D-4	2004.6.5	Kashima Soccer Stadium	Kashima Antlers	0-2
GL-D-5	2004.7.17	Hitachi Kashiwa Soccer Stadium	Kashima Antlers	0-0
GL-D-6	2004.7.24	Ajinomoto Stadium	FC Tokyo	1-1

== Player statistics ==
No.	Pos.	Player	D.o.B. (Age)	Height / Weight	J. League 1		Emperor's Cup		J. League Cup		Total	
No.	Pos.	Player	D.o.B. (Age)	Height / Weight	Apps	Goals	Apps	Goals	Apps	Goals	Apps	Goals
1	GK	Yuta Minami	September 30, 1979 (aged 24)	cm / kg	28	0						
2	DF	Kensuke Nebiki	September 7, 1977 (aged 26)	cm / kg	1	0						
2	DF	Ever Palacios	January 18, 1969 (aged 35)	cm / kg	7	0						
3	DF	Norihiro Satsukawa	April 18, 1972 (aged 31)	cm / kg	8	0						
4	DF	Takeshi Watanabe	September 10, 1972 (aged 31)	cm / kg	15	0						
5	DF	Sota Nakazawa	October 26, 1982 (aged 21)	cm / kg	9	0						
6	MF	Dudu Cearense	April 15, 1983 (aged 20)	cm / kg	11	2						
7	MF	Tomokazu Myojin	January 24, 1978 (aged 26)	cm / kg	28	5						
8	MF	Ricardinho	June 24, 1976 (aged 27)	cm / kg	11	0						
9	FW	Yoshiteru Yamashita	November 21, 1977 (aged 26)	cm / kg	13	0						
10	MF	Zé Roberto	December 9, 1980 (aged 23)	cm / kg	18	1						
11	MF	Nozomu Kato	October 7, 1969 (aged 34)	cm / kg	7	0						
12	MF	Tadatoshi Masuda	December 25, 1973 (aged 30)	cm / kg	19	2						
13	DF	Yuzo Kobayashi	November 15, 1985 (aged 18)	cm / kg	9	0						
14	DF	Masayuki Ochiai	July 11, 1981 (aged 22)	cm / kg	2	0						
14	MF	Harutaka Ono	May 12, 1978 (aged 25)	cm / kg	12	0						
15	MF	Tatsuya Yazawa	October 3, 1984 (aged 19)	cm / kg	26	0						
16	MF	Shinya Tanoue	February 5, 1980 (aged 24)	cm / kg	1	0						
17	MF	Shunta Nagai	July 12, 1982 (aged 21)	cm / kg	2	0						
18	FW	Kisho Yano	April 5, 1984 (aged 19)	cm / kg	2	0						
19	FW	Yuji Unozawa	May 3, 1983 (aged 20)	cm / kg	11	1						
20	DF	Mitsuru Nagata	April 6, 1983 (aged 20)	cm / kg	28	2						
21	GK	Kenta Shimizu	September 18, 1981 (aged 22)	cm / kg	2	0						
22	FW	Toshiaki Haji	August 28, 1978 (aged 25)	cm / kg	8	1						
23	MF	Hidekazu Otani	November 6, 1984 (aged 19)	cm / kg	16	1						
24	MF	Tomonori Hirayama	January 9, 1978 (aged 26)	cm / kg	5	1						
25	MF	Takahiro Shimotaira	December 18, 1971 (aged 32)	cm / kg	13	0						
26	DF	Naoya Kondo	October 3, 1983 (aged 20)	cm / kg	26	1						
27	MF	Takehito Shigehara	October 6, 1981 (aged 22)	cm / kg	15	0						
28	FW	Keiji Tamada	April 11, 1980 (aged 23)	cm / kg	28	10						
29	MF	Shogo Nakai	June 19, 1984 (aged 19)	cm / kg	0	0						
30	DF	Tetsuya Yano	May 21, 1984 (aged 19)	cm / kg	0	0						
31	MF	Minoru Suganuma	May 16, 1985 (aged 18)	cm / kg	3	0						
32	DF	Naoki Ishikawa	September 13, 1985 (aged 18)	cm / kg	0	0						
33	MF	Hikaru Hironiwa	July 5, 1985 (aged 18)	cm / kg	0	0						
34	GK	Erikson Noguchipinto	January 27, 1981 (aged 23)	cm / kg	1	0						
35	DF	Takayuki Komine	April 25, 1974 (aged 29)	cm / kg	2	0						
38	DF	Yasuhiro Hato	May 4, 1976 (aged 27)	cm / kg	20	1						

== Other pages ==
- (in Japanese) J. League official site
