= Shinya Tanoue =

Japanese footballer

Shinya Tanoue 田ノ上 信也
Personal information
- Full name: Shinya Tanoue
- Date of birth: February 5, 1980 (age 46)
- Place of birth: Satsumasendai, Kagoshima, Japan
- Height: 1.72 m (5 ft 7 1/2 in)
- Position: Midfielder

Youth career
- 1995–1997: Kagoshima Jitsugyo High School

Senior career*
Years	Team	Apps	(Gls)
1998–2005	Kashiwa Reysol	25	(4)
2006	Yokohama F. Marinos	0	(0)
2007–2008	Vegalta Sendai	50	(2)
Total		75	(6)
Medal record
Kashiwa Reysol
Winner	J.League Cup	1999
- * Club domestic league appearances and goals

Shinya Tanoue (田ノ上 信也, Tanoue Shinya; born February 5, 1980) is a former Japanese football player.

== Playing career ==
Tanoue was born in Satsumasendai on February 5, 1980. After graduating from high school, he joined J1 League club Kashiwa Reysol in 1998. He could hardly play in the match until 2001. He got opportunity to play as offensive midfielder from late 2002 to 2003. However he could hardly play in the match from 2004. In 2006, he moved to Yokohama F. Marinos. However he could not play at all in the match. In 2007, he moved to J2 League club Vegalta Sendai. He became a regular player as left side back. He retired end of 2008 season.

== Career statistics ==
Appearances and goals by club, season and competition
Club	Season	League			Emperor's Cup		J.League Cup		Total	
Club	Season	Division	Apps	Goals	Apps	Goals	Apps	Goals	Apps	Goals
Kashiwa Reysol	1998	J1 League	0	0	0	0	0	0	0	0
Kashiwa Reysol	1999	J1 League	0	0	1	0	0	0	1	0
Kashiwa Reysol	2000	J1 League	2	0	0	0	0	0	2	0
Kashiwa Reysol	2001	J1 League	3	2	1	0	1	0	5	2
Kashiwa Reysol	2002	J1 League	10	1	1	0	0	0	11	1
Kashiwa Reysol	2003	J1 League	9	1	2	0	5	0	16	1
Kashiwa Reysol	2004	J1 League	1	0	0	0	2	0	3	0
Kashiwa Reysol	2005	J1 League	0	0	0	0	0	0	0	0
Yokohama F. Marinos	2006	J1 League	0	0	0	0	0	0	0	0
Vegalta Sendai	2007	J2 League	36	2	1	1	—		37	3
Vegalta Sendai	2008	J2 League	14	0	2	1	—		16	1
Career total			75	6	8	2	8	0	91	8
