= 2002 Kashiwa Reysol season =

Kashiwa Reysol
2002 season
- Manager: Steve Perryman; Marco Aurelio
- Stadium: Hitachi Kashiwa Soccer Stadium
- J.League 1: 12th
- Emperor's Cup: 3rd Round
- J.League Cup: Quarterfinals
- Top goalscorer: Edílson (7)
Home colours	Away colours

2002 Kashiwa Reysol season

== Competitions ==
Competitions	Position
J.League 1	12th / 16 clubs
Emperor's Cup	3rd round
J.League Cup	Quarterfinals

== Domestic results ==
=== J.League 1 ===
Match	Date	Venue	Opponents	Score
1-1	2002.3.3	Osaka Expo '70 Stadium	Gamba Osaka	0-1
1-2	2002.3.9	Hitachi Kashiwa Soccer Stadium	Sanfrecce Hiroshima	2-1
1-3	2002.3.16	Sendai Stadium	Vegalta Sendai	2-5
1-4	2002.3.31	National Olympic Stadium (Tokyo)	Tokyo Verdy 1969	1-0
1-5	2002.4.6	Hitachi Kashiwa Soccer Stadium	Consadole Sapporo	4-1
1-6	2002.4.13	Toyota Stadium	Nagoya Grampus Eight	0-2
1-7	2002.4.20	Hitachi Kashiwa Soccer Stadium	Vissel Kobe	1-0 a.e.t. (sudden death)
1-8	2002.7.13	Nishikyogoku Athletic Stadium	Kyoto Purple Sanga	0-2
1-9	2002.7.20	Kashima Soccer Stadium	Kashima Antlers	2-3
1-10	2002.7.24	National Olympic Stadium (Tokyo)	Urawa Red Diamonds	1-2
1-11	2002.7.27	National Olympic Stadium (Tokyo)	Yokohama F. Marinos	2-3 a.e.t. (sudden death)
1-12	2002.8.3	Hitachi Kashiwa Soccer Stadium	FC Tokyo	1-3
1-13	2002.8.7	Nihondaira Sports Stadium	Shimizu S-Pulse	1-2
1-14	2002.8.11	Hitachi Kashiwa Soccer Stadium	JEF United Ichihara	1-3
1-15	2002.8.17	Kashiwa no Ha Park Stadium	Júbilo Iwata	2-3
2-1	2002.8.31	Sapporo Atsubetsu Park Stadium	Consadole Sapporo	2-2 a.e.t.
2-2	2002.9.7	Hitachi Kashiwa Soccer Stadium	Nagoya Grampus Eight	1-1 a.e.t.
2-3	2002.9.14	Hitachi Kashiwa Soccer Stadium	Kyoto Purple Sanga	0-1
2-4	2002.9.18	Urawa Komaba Stadium	Urawa Red Diamonds	1-1 a.e.t.
2-5	2002.9.21	Kashiwa no Ha Park Stadium	Kashima Antlers	1-0
2-6	2002.9.28	Hitachi Kashiwa Soccer Stadium	Vegalta Sendai	1-0
2-7	2002.10.5	Tokyo Stadium	FC Tokyo	1-0
2-8	2002.10.13	National Olympic Stadium (Tokyo)	Yokohama F. Marinos	0-1 a.e.t. (sudden death)
2-9	2002.10.20	Ichihara Seaside Stadium	JEF United Ichihara	1-2
2-11	2002.10.26	Tottori Soccer Stadium	Vissel Kobe	1-3
2-10	2002.10.30	Hitachi Kashiwa Soccer Stadium	Shimizu S-Pulse	1-0
2-12	2002.11.10	Yamaha Stadium	Júbilo Iwata	2-3
2-13	2002.11.17	Hitachi Kashiwa Soccer Stadium	Tokyo Verdy 1969	4-1
2-14	2002.11.23	Hiroshima Big Arch	Sanfrecce Hiroshima	0-2
2-15	2002.11.30	Hitachi Kashiwa Soccer Stadium	Gamba Osaka	2-0

=== Emperor's Cup ===
Match	Date	Venue	Opponents	Score
3rd round	2002..			-

=== J.League Cup ===
Match	Date	Venue	Opponents	Score
GL-A-1	2002..			-
GL-A-2	2002..			-
GL-A-3	2002..			-
GL-A-4	2002..			-
GL-A-5	2002..			-
GL-A-6	2002..			-
Quarterfinals	2002..			-

== Player statistics ==
No.	Pos.	Player	D.o.B. (Age)	Height / Weight	J.League 1		Emperor's Cup		J.League Cup		Total	
No.	Pos.	Player	D.o.B. (Age)	Height / Weight	Apps	Goals	Apps	Goals	Apps	Goals	Apps	Goals
1	GK	Yuta Minami	September 30, 1979 (aged 22)	cm / kg	27	0						
2	DF	Shigenori Hagimura	July 31, 1976 (aged 25)	cm / kg	12	0						
3	DF	Norihiro Satsukawa	April 18, 1972 (aged 29)	cm / kg	28	0						
4	DF	Takeshi Watanabe	September 10, 1972 (aged 29)	cm / kg	28	1						
5	DF	Sota Nakazawa	October 26, 1982 (aged 19)	cm / kg	1	0						
6	MF	Yoo Sang-Chul	October 18, 1971 (aged 30)	cm / kg	9	5						
7	MF	Tomokazu Myojin	January 24, 1978 (aged 24)	cm / kg	27	1						
8	MF	César Sampaio	March 31, 1968 (aged 33)	cm / kg	26	3						
9	FW	Hideaki Kitajima	May 23, 1978 (aged 23)	cm / kg	18	2						
10	MF	Harutaka Ono	May 12, 1978 (aged 23)	cm / kg	22	2						
11	MF	Nozomu Kato	October 7, 1969 (aged 32)	cm / kg	18	3						
12	DF	Takumi Morikawa	July 11, 1977 (aged 24)	cm / kg	6	0						
13	MF	Mitsuteru Watanabe	April 10, 1974 (aged 27)	cm / kg	25	1						
14	DF	Masayuki Ochiai	July 11, 1981 (aged 20)	cm / kg	1	0						
15	MF	Makoto Sunakawa	August 10, 1977 (aged 24)	cm / kg	12	0						
16	GK	Dai Sato	August 16, 1971 (aged 30)	cm / kg	1	0						
17	MF	Shunta Nagai	July 12, 1982 (aged 19)	cm / kg	2	0						
18	FW	Hwang Sun-hong	July 14, 1968 (aged 33)	cm / kg	7	1						
19	DF	Arata Sugiyama	July 25, 1980 (aged 21)	cm / kg	2	0						
20	DF	Mitsuru Nagata	April 6, 1983 (aged 18)	cm / kg	6	0						
21	GK	Kenta Shimizu	September 18, 1981 (aged 20)	cm / kg	0	0						
22	GK	Motohiro Yoshida	August 25, 1974 (aged 27)	cm / kg	3	0						
23	DF	Kensuke Nebiki	September 7, 1977 (aged 24)	cm / kg	21	1						
24	MF	Tomonori Hirayama	January 9, 1978 (aged 24)	cm / kg	27	2						
25	MF	Shinya Yabusaki	June 1, 1978 (aged 23)	cm / kg	0	0						
26	DF	Naoya Kondo	October 3, 1983 (aged 18)	cm / kg	0	0						
27	MF	Shinya Tanoue	February 5, 1980 (aged 22)	cm / kg	10	1						
28	FW	Keiji Tamada	April 11, 1980 (aged 21)	cm / kg	13	3						
29	FW	Tadamichi Machida	May 23, 1981 (aged 20)	cm / kg	3	0						
30	MF	Shinya Ichikawa	January 19, 1982 (aged 20)	cm / kg	0	0						
31	FW	Taro Sugahara	June 14, 1981 (aged 20)	cm / kg	4	0						
32	MF	Yuma Fujita	August 2, 1982 (aged 19)	cm / kg	0	0						
33	FW	Yuji Unozawa	May 3, 1983 (aged 18)	cm / kg	13	3						
34	FW	Edílson	September 17, 1970 (aged 31)	cm / kg	16	7						
35	MF	Ricardinho	June 24, 1976 (aged 25)	cm / kg	11	1						
36	FW	Kenji Oshiba	November 19, 1973 (aged 28)	cm / kg	1	0						
37	FW	Ricardo	May 19, 1984 (aged 17)	cm / kg	2	0						
38	MF	Minoru Suganuma	May 16, 1985 (aged 16)	cm / kg	2	0						

== Other pages ==
- (in Japanese) J. League official site
