= Takumi Morikawa =

Japanese footballer

Takumi Morikawa 森川 拓巳
Personal information
- Full name: Takumi Morikawa
- Date of birth: July 11, 1977 (age 49)
- Place of birth: Hamamatsu, Japan
- Height: 1.71 m (5 ft 7 1/2 in)
- Position: Defender

Youth career
- 1993–1995: Shizuoka Gakuen High School

Senior career*
Years	Team	Apps	(Gls)
1996–2002	Kashiwa Reysol	28	(0)
1997	→Juventude (loan)		
1999–2000	→Kawasaki Frontale (loan)	43	(3)
2001	→Consadole Sapporo (loan)	15	(0)
2003–2005	Vegalta Sendai	71	(0)
2006–2007	Rosso Kumamoto	35	(0)
Total		192	(3)
Medal record
Kashiwa Reysol
Winner	J.League Cup	1999
Kawasaki Frontale
Runner-up	J.League Cup	2000
- * Club domestic league appearances and goals

Takumi Morikawa (森川 拓巳, Morikawa Takumi; born July 11, 1977) is a former Japanese football player.

== Playing career ==
Morikawa was born in Hamamatsu on July 11, 1977. After graduating from Shizuoka Gakuen High School, he joined J1 League club Kashiwa Reysol in 1996. In 1998, he played many matches as left defender of three backs defense and defensive midfielder. However he could not play at all in the match in 1999. In April 1999, he moved to newly was promoted to J2 League club, Kawasaki Frontale. He became a regular player as left defender of three backs defense. The club also won the champions in 1999 and was promoted to J1 from 2000. However his opportunity to play decreased in 2000. Although the club won the 2nd place J.League Cup, the club was relegated to J2 in a year. In 2001, he moved to newly was promoted to J1 League club, Consadole Sapporo on loan. In 2002, he returned to Kashiwa Reysol. However he could hardly play in the match. In 2003, he moved to Vegalta Sendai. Although the club was relegated to J2 from 2004, he became a regular player from 2004. In 2006, he moved to Japan Football League club Rosso Kumamoto. Although he played as regular player in 2006, his opportunity to play decreased for injury in 2007 and retired at the end of the 2007 season.

== Career statistics ==
Appearances and goals by club, season and competition
Club	Season	League			Emperor's Cup		J.League Cup		Total	
Club	Season	Division	Apps	Goals	Apps	Goals	Apps	Goals	Apps	Goals
Kashiwa Reysol	1996	J1 League	2	0	0	0	3	0	5	0
Kashiwa Reysol	1997	J1 League	0	0	0	0	0	0	0	0
Kashiwa Reysol	1998	J1 League	20	0	0	0	4	0	24	0
Kashiwa Reysol	1999	J1 League	0	0	0	0	0	0	0	0
Kawasaki Frontale	1999	J2 League	26	2	3	0	0	0	29	2
Kawasaki Frontale	2000	J1 League	17	1	1	0	4	0	22	1
Consadole Sapporo	2001	J1 League	15	0	1	0	2	0	18	0
Kashiwa Reysol	2002	J1 League	6	0	0	0	4	0	10	0
Vegalta Sendai	2003	J1 League	13	0	0	0	5	0	18	0
Vegalta Sendai	2004	J2 League	33	0	1	0	—		34	0
Vegalta Sendai	2005	J2 League	25	0	1	0	—		26	0
Rosso Kumamoto	2006	Football League	26	0	3	1	—		29	1
Rosso Kumamoto	2007	Football League	9	0	0	0	—		9	0
Career total			192	3	10	1	22	0	224	4
