= 2003 Kashiwa Reysol season =

Kashiwa Reysol
2003 season
- Manager: Marco Aurelio
- Stadium: Hitachi Kashiwa Soccer Stadium
- J.League 1: 12th
- Emperor's Cup: 4th Round
- J.League Cup: GL-B 4th
- Top goalscorer: Keiji Tamada (11)
Home colours	Away colours

2003 Kashiwa Reysol season

== Competitions ==
Competitions	Position
J.League 1	12th / 16 clubs
Emperor's Cup	4th round
J.League Cup	GL-B 4th / 4 clubs

== Domestic results ==
=== J.League 1 ===
Match	Date	Venue	Opponents	Score
1-1	2003.3.22	Ajinomoto Stadium	FC Tokyo	1-2
1-2	2003.4.5	Kashiwa no Ha Park Stadium	Kashima Antlers	1-2
1-3	2003.4.12	Kagoshima Kamoike Stadium	Kyoto Purple Sanga	1-0
1-4	2003.4.20	Hitachi Kashiwa Soccer Stadium	Cerezo Osaka	3-2
1-5	2003.4.26	Mizuho Athletic Stadium	Nagoya Grampus Eight	1-1
1-6	2003.4.29	Shizuoka Stadium	Shimizu S-Pulse	2-0
1-7	2003.5.5	Hitachi Kashiwa Soccer Stadium	Vissel Kobe	0-1
1-8	2003.5.10	Osaka Expo '70 Stadium	Gamba Osaka	3-2
1-9	2003.5.17	Hitachi Kashiwa Soccer Stadium	Yokohama F. Marinos	3-1
1-10	2003.5.24	Ōita Stadium	Oita Trinita	0-0
1-11	2003.7.5	Hitachi Kashiwa Soccer Stadium	JEF United Ichihara	0-2
1-12	2003.7.12	Ajinomoto Stadium	Tokyo Verdy 1969	1-3
1-13	2003.7.20	Kashiwa no Ha Park Stadium	Urawa Red Diamonds	1-1
1-14	2003.7.26	National Olympic Stadium (Tokyo)	Júbilo Iwata	0-1
1-15	2003.8.2	Sendai Stadium	Vegalta Sendai	2-1
2-1	2003.8.16	Hitachi Kashiwa Soccer Stadium	Kyoto Purple Sanga	2-1
2-2	2003.8.23	Nagai Stadium	Cerezo Osaka	1-0
2-3	2003.8.30	Hitachi Kashiwa Soccer Stadium	Gamba Osaka	1-1
2-4	2003.9.6	International Stadium Yokohama	Yokohama F. Marinos	0-1
2-5	2003.9.13	Hitachi Kashiwa Soccer Stadium	Oita Trinita	0-0
2-6	2003.9.20	Ichihara Seaside Stadium	JEF United Ichihara	1-1
2-7	2003.9.23	Kashiwa no Ha Park Stadium	Vegalta Sendai	1-0
2-8	2003.9.28	Yamaha Stadium	Júbilo Iwata	1-1
2-9	2003.10.4	Hitachi Kashiwa Soccer Stadium	Nagoya Grampus Eight	2-2
2-10	2003.10.19	Hitachi Kashiwa Soccer Stadium	Tokyo Verdy 1969	0-2
2-11	2003.10.26	Saitama Stadium 2002	Urawa Red Diamonds	0-0
2-12	2003.11.8	Hitachi Kashiwa Soccer Stadium	Shimizu S-Pulse	2-3
2-13	2003.11.15	Kobe Wing Stadium	Vissel Kobe	2-2
2-14	2003.11.23	Kashima Soccer Stadium	Kashima Antlers	1-2
2-15	2003.11.29	Hitachi Kashiwa Soccer Stadium	FC Tokyo	2-4

=== Emperor's Cup ===
Match	Date	Venue	Opponents	Score
3rd round	2003..			-
4th round	2003..			-

=== J.League Cup ===
Match	Date	Venue	Opponents	Score
GL-B-1	2003..			-
GL-B-2	2003..			-
GL-B-3	2003..			-
GL-B-4	2003..			-
GL-B-5	2003..			-
GL-B-6	2003..			-

== Player statistics ==
No.	Pos.	Player	D.o.B. (Age)	Height / Weight	J.League 1		Emperor's Cup		J.League Cup		Total	
No.	Pos.	Player	D.o.B. (Age)	Height / Weight	Apps	Goals	Apps	Goals	Apps	Goals	Apps	Goals
1	GK	Yuta Minami	September 30, 1979 (aged 23)	cm / kg	26	0						
2	DF	Kensuke Nebiki	September 7, 1977 (aged 25)	cm / kg	3	0						
3	DF	Norihiro Satsukawa	April 18, 1972 (aged 30)	cm / kg	24	0						
4	DF	Takeshi Watanabe	September 10, 1972 (aged 30)	cm / kg	14	2						
5	DF	Sota Nakazawa	October 26, 1982 (aged 20)	cm / kg	0	0						
6	MF	Ricardinho	June 24, 1976 (aged 26)	cm / kg	21	4						
7	MF	Tomokazu Myojin	January 24, 1978 (aged 25)	cm / kg	29	1						
8	FW	Edílson	September 17, 1970 (aged 32)	cm / kg	0	0						
8	FW	Jussiê	September 19, 1983 (aged 19)	cm / kg	17	5						
9	FW	Márcio Nobre	November 6, 1980 (aged 22)	cm / kg	13	0						
10	MF	Harutaka Ono	May 12, 1978 (aged 24)	cm / kg	3	0						
11	MF	Nozomu Kato	October 7, 1969 (aged 33)	cm / kg	10	0						
12	MF	Tadatoshi Masuda	December 25, 1973 (aged 29)	cm / kg	13	0						
13	MF	Mitsuteru Watanabe	April 10, 1974 (aged 28)	cm / kg	20	2						
14	DF	Masayuki Ochiai	July 11, 1981 (aged 21)	cm / kg	9	0						
15	MF	Tatsuya Yazawa	October 3, 1984 (aged 18)	cm / kg	14	2						
16	GK	Dai Sato	August 16, 1971 (aged 31)	cm / kg	1	0						
17	MF	Shunta Nagai	July 12, 1982 (aged 20)	cm / kg	10	0						
18	FW	Kisho Yano	April 5, 1984 (aged 18)	cm / kg	18	2						
19	FW	Yuji Unozawa	May 3, 1983 (aged 19)	cm / kg	15	0						
20	DF	Mitsuru Nagata	April 6, 1983 (aged 19)	cm / kg	23	0						
21	GK	Kenta Shimizu	September 18, 1981 (aged 21)	cm / kg	3	0						
22	DF	Shigenori Hagimura	July 31, 1976 (aged 26)	cm / kg	11	2						
23	MF	Hidekazu Otani	November 6, 1984 (aged 18)	cm / kg	4	0						
24	MF	Tomonori Hirayama	January 9, 1978 (aged 25)	cm / kg	27	1						
25	MF	Takahiro Shimotaira	December 18, 1971 (aged 31)	cm / kg	20	0						
26	DF	Naoya Kondo	October 3, 1983 (aged 19)	cm / kg	15	1						
27	MF	Shinya Tanoue	February 5, 1980 (aged 23)	cm / kg	9	1						
28	FW	Keiji Tamada	April 11, 1980 (aged 22)	cm / kg	28	11						
29	MF	Shogo Nakai	June 19, 1984 (aged 18)	cm / kg	0	0						
30	DF	Tetsuya Yano	May 21, 1984 (aged 18)	cm / kg	0	0						
31	MF	Minoru Suganuma	May 16, 1985 (aged 17)	cm / kg	4	1						
32	MF	Robert	April 10, 1985 (aged 17)	cm / kg	1	0						

== Other pages ==
- (in Japanese) J. League official site
