= Kensuke Nebiki =

Japanese footballer

Kensuke Nebiki 根引 謙介
Personal information
- Full name: Kensuke Nebiki
- Date of birth: September 7, 1977 (age 49)
- Place of birth: Osaka, Japan
- Height: 1.85 m (6 ft 1 in)
- Position: Defender

Youth career
- 1993–1995: Kashiwa Reysol

Senior career*
Years	Team	Apps	(Gls)
1996–2006	Kashiwa Reysol	47	(1)
1996–1997	→ Independiente (loan)		
2004–2005	→ Vegalta Sendai (loan)	56	(4)
Total		103	(5)
Medal record
Kashiwa Reysol
Winner	J.League Cup	1999
- * Club domestic league appearances and goals

Kensuke Nebiki (根引 謙介, Nebiki Kensuke; born September 7, 1977) is a former Japanese football player.

== Playing career ==
Nebiki was born in Osaka Prefecture on September 7, 1977. He joined J1 League club Kashiwa Reysol from youth team in 1996. He played many matches as center back from 2001. However he could hardly play in the match behind young player Mitsuru Nagata and Naoya Kondo from 2003. In June 2004, he moved to J2 League club Vegalta Sendai on loan. He played as regular player in 2 seasons. In 2006, he returned to Kashiwa Reysol. However he could not play at all in the match and retired at the end of the 2006 season.

== Career statistics ==
Appearances and goals by club, season and competition
Club	Season	League			Emperor's Cup		J.League Cup		Total	
Club	Season	Division	Apps	Goals	Apps	Goals	Apps	Goals	Apps	Goals
Kashiwa Reysol	1996	J1 League	0	0	0	0	0	0	0	0
Kashiwa Reysol	1997	J1 League	0	0	0	0	0	0	0	0
Kashiwa Reysol	1998	J1 League	0	0	0	0	0	0	0	0
Kashiwa Reysol	1999	J1 League	1	0	0	0	1	0	2	0
Kashiwa Reysol	2000	J1 League	0	0	0	0	0	0	0	0
Kashiwa Reysol	2001	J1 League	21	0	1	0	3	0	25	0
Kashiwa Reysol	2002	J1 League	21	1	1	0	7	0	29	1
Kashiwa Reysol	2003	J1 League	3	0	2	0	3	0	8	0
Kashiwa Reysol	2004	J1 League	1	0	0	0	0	0	1	0
Vegalta Sendai	2004	J2 League	26	0	2	1	—		28	1
Vegalta Sendai	2005	J2 League	30	4	1	0	—		31	4
Kashiwa Reysol	2006	J2 League	0	0	0	0	—		0	0
Career total			103	5	7	1	14	0	124	5
