= Nozomu Kato =

Japanese footballer and manager

Nozomu Kato 加藤 望
Personal information
- Full name: Nozomu Kato
- Date of birth: October 7, 1969 (age 57)
- Place of birth: Miyagi, Japan
- Height: 1.70 m (5 ft 7 in)
- Position: Midfielder

Youth career
- 1985–1987: Tohoku Gakuin High School
- 1988–1991: Tokai University

Senior career*
Years	Team	Apps	(Gls)
1992–2004	Kashiwa Reysol	288	(52)
2005–2008	Shonan Bellmare	170	(30)
Total		458	(82)

Managerial career
- 2018: Kashiwa Reysol
Medal record
Kashiwa Reysol
Winner	J.League Cup	1999
- * Club domestic league appearances and goals

Nozomu Kato (加藤 望, Katō Nozomu; born October 7, 1969) is a Japanese football manager and former football player he is the currently development coach of J3 League side Matsumoto Yamaga.

== Playing career ==
Kato was born in Miyagi Prefecture on October 7, 1969. After graduating from Tokai University, he joined Japan Football League club Hitachi (later Kashiwa Reysol) in 1992. He became a regular player as an offensive midfielder in 1994. He also played as forward, not only midfielder. The club also won second place in 1994 and was promoted to the J1 League in 1995. The club won the 1999 J.League Cup. Although he played as a regular player for a long time, he did not play as much in 2002. In 2005, he moved to the J2 League club Shonan Bellmare. He played as a regular player for four seasons and retired at the end of the 2008 season at the age of 39.

== Coaching career ==
After retirement, Kato started a coaching career at Shonan Bellmare in 2009. He served as coach for the top team (2009–10) and manager for the youth team (2011–12). In 2013, he became a manager for Sanno Institute of Management and managed until 2017. In 2018, he moved to Kashiwa Reysol, where he first played. He became a coach under the manager Takahiro Shimotaira who Kato's teammate when Kato played for Reysol. Shimotaira was terminated for poor results in May and Kato became a new manager. However, Kato could not improve the club's record and he was terminated in November.

== Career statistics ==
Appearances and goals by club, season and competition
Club	Season	League			Emperor's Cup		J.League Cup		Total	
Club	Season	Division	Apps	Goals	Apps	Goals	Apps	Goals	Apps	Goals
Hitachi	1992	Football League	3	0	—		—		3	0
Kashiwa Reysol	1993	Football League	7	0	0	0	—		7	0
Kashiwa Reysol	1994	Football League	26	6	0	0	1	0	27	6
Kashiwa Reysol	1995	J1 League	46	8	2	0	—		48	8
Kashiwa Reysol	1996	J1 League	27	8	2	0	14	2	43	10
Kashiwa Reysol	1997	J1 League	32	4	3	1	8	1	43	6
Kashiwa Reysol	1998	J1 League	34	8	2	1	4	6	40	15
Kashiwa Reysol	1999	J1 League	30	9	4	0	8	2	42	11
Kashiwa Reysol	2000	J1 League	29	2	2	2	2	0	33	4
Kashiwa Reysol	2001	J1 League	22	4	1	0	4	2	27	6
Kashiwa Reysol	2002	J1 League	18	3	0	0	6	0	24	3
Kashiwa Reysol	2003	J1 League	10	0	1	0	2	0	13	0
Kashiwa Reysol	2004	J1 League	7	0	1	0	2	0	10	0
Shonan Bellmare	2005	J2 League	41	9	1	0	—		42	9
Shonan Bellmare	2006	J2 League	42	6	2	0	—		44	6
Shonan Bellmare	2007	J2 League	47	10	1	0	—		48	6
Shonan Bellmare	2008	J2 League	40	5	1	0	—		41	5
Career total			458	82	23	4	51	13	532	99

== Managerial statistics ==
Team	From	To	Record				
Team	From	To	G	W	D	L	Win %
Kashiwa Reysol	2018	2018	18	5	1	12	27.78
Total			18	5	1	12	27.78
