= Norihiro Satsukawa =

Japanese footballer and manager (born 1972)

Norihiro Satsukawa 薩川 了洋
Personal information
- Full name: Norihiro Satsukawa
- Date of birth: April 18, 1972 (age 54)
- Place of birth: Shizuoka, Japan
- Height: 1.75 m (5 ft 9 in)
- Position: Defender

Youth career
- 1988–1990: Shimizu Commercial High School

Senior career*
Years	Team	Apps	(Gls)
1991–1998	Yokohama Flügels	162	(1)
1999–2005	Kashiwa Reysol	161	(1)
Total		323	(2)

Managerial career
- 2010–2012: AC Nagano Parceiro
- 2013–2015: FC Ryukyu
- 2016: SC Sagamihara
- 2017–2018: Nara Club
- 2019: Banditonce Kakogawa
- 2022: SC Sagamihara
Medal record
Yokohama Flügels
Winner	Emperor's Cup	1993
Winner	Emperor's Cup	1998
Runner-up	Emperor's Cup	1997
Kashiwa Reysol
Winner	J.League Cup	1999
- * Club domestic league appearances and goals

Norihiro Satsukawa (薩川 了洋, Satsukawa Norihiro; born April 18, 1972) is a Japanese football manager and former football player. He manages Sakai Trinitas in the Kantō Soccer League Division 2.

== Playing career ==
Born in Shizuoka on April 18, 1972, Satsukawa graduated from Shimizu Commercial High School and joined All Nippon Airways (later Yokohama Flügels) in 1991. He played many matches as a center back in his debut season. The club won the 1993 Emperor's Cup, their first major title, and the 1994–95 Asian Cup Winners' Cup, their first Asian title. Financial difficulties led to the club's dissolution after the 1998 season, during which they won the 1998 Emperor's Cup. Satsukawa played all four matches before the semifinals, but missed the final due to a suspension.

In 1999, he joined Kashiwa Reysol, playing as a left back alongside Hong Myung-bo and Takeshi Watanabe until 2001. The club won the 1999 J.League Cup and finished third in the 1999 and 2000 J1 League seasons. Later, as the club struggled, he shifted to center back. In October 2003, he broke his right leg, sidelining him for 10 months. He returned in August 2004, but Kashiwa Reysol finished last in the 2004 season and faced relegation to the J2 League after the 2005 season, prompting his retirement.

== Coaching career ==
Satsukawa began coaching at Kashiwa Reysol in 2007. In 2008, he joined Regional Leagues club AC Nagano Parceiro as a coach and became manager in 2010. Under his leadership, the club earned promotion to the Japan Football League (JFL) in 2010 and secured second place in 2011 and 2012. In 2013, he moved to JFL club FC Ryukyu, guiding them to promotion to the J3 League in 2014. In 2016, he managed SC Sagamihara in the J3 League but resigned in August. He coached Nara Club in the JFL for two seasons (2017–2018) before joining Banditonce Kakogawa in the Regional Leagues in 2019.

== Career statistics ==
Appearances and goals by club, season and competition
Club	Season	League			Emperor's Cup		J.League Cup		Total	
Club	Season	Division	Apps	Goals	Apps	Goals	Apps	Goals	Apps	Goals
All Nippon Airways	1991–92	JSL Division 1	12	0			0	0	12	0
Yokohama Flügels	1992	J1 League	-				1	0	1	0
Yokohama Flügels	1993	J1 League	20	0	4	0	5	0	29	0
Yokohama Flügels	1994	J1 League	35	0	2	0	2	0	39	0
Yokohama Flügels	1995	J1 League	14	0	0	0	-		14	0
Yokohama Flügels	1996	J1 League	22	1	2	0	14	2	38	3
Yokohama Flügels	1997	J1 League	27	0	5	0	10	0	42	0
Yokohama Flügels	1998	J1 League	32	0	4	0	4	0	40	0
Kashiwa Reysol	1999	J1 League	28	0	4	0	8	0	40	0
Kashiwa Reysol	2000	J1 League	28	0	2	0	2	0	32	0
Kashiwa Reysol	2001	J1 League	26	1	1	0	4	0	31	1
Kashiwa Reysol	2002	J1 League	28	0	1	0	5	0	34	0
Kashiwa Reysol	2003	J1 League	24	0	0	0	1	0	25	0
Kashiwa Reysol	2004	J1 League	8	0	1	0	0	0	9	0
Kashiwa Reysol	2005	J1 League	19	0	1	0	3	0	23	0
Career total			323	2	27	0	59	2	409	4

== Managerial statistics ==
According to the J-League data site:

Team	From	To	Record				
Team	From	To	G	W	D	L	Win %
FC Ryukyu	2014	2015	69	20	19	30	28.99
SC Sagamihara	2016	2016	20	8	6	6	40.00
Nara Club	2017	2018	60	22	16	22	36.67
Banditonce Kakogawa	2019		0	0	0	0	—
SC Sagamihara	2022		0	0	0	0	—
Total			149	50	41	58	33.56
