= Marcão (footballer, born 1965) =

Brazilian footballer

Personal information
- Full name: Marco Antonio de Almeida Ferreira
- Date of birth: December 20, 1965 (age 60)
- Place of birth: Santo Antônio de Pádua, Brazil
- Height: 1.86 m (6 ft 1 in)
- Position: Defender

Senior career*
Years	Team	Apps	(Gls)
1998	Kashiwa Reysol	1	(0)
- * Club domestic league appearances and goals

Marco Antônio de Almeida Ferreira, sometimes known as Marcão (born December 20, 1965), is a Brazilian former football player.

== Career statistics ==
Appearances and goals by club, season and competition
Club	Season	League			Emperor's Cup		J.League Cup		Total	
Club	Season	Division	Apps	Goals	Apps	Goals	Apps	Goals	Apps	Goals
Kashiwa Reysol	1998	J1 League	1	0	0	0	0	0	1	0
Career total			1	0	0	0	0	0	1	0
