= 1999 Kashiwa Reysol season =

Kashiwa Reysol
1999 season
- Manager: Akira Nishino
- Stadium: Hitachi Kashiwa Soccer Stadium
- J.League 1: 3rd
- Emperor's Cup: Semifinals
- J.League Cup: Champions
- Top goalscorer: Bentinho (10)
| Home colours | Away colours |

1999 Kashiwa Reysol season

== Competitions ==
| Competitions | Position |
|---|---|
| J.League 1 | 3rd / 16 clubs |
| Emperor's Cup | Semifinals |
| J.League Cup | Champions |

== Domestic results ==
=== J.League 1 ===
| 6 March 1999 1-1 | Kashiwa Reysol | 1-0 | Kyoto Purple Sanga | Hitachi Kashiwa Soccer Stadium |
| JST (UTC+09) |

| 13 March 1999 1-2 | Avispa Fukuoka | 1-4 | Kashiwa Reysol | Hakatanomori Football Stadium |
| JST (UTC+09) |

| 20 March 1999 1-3 | Yokohama F. Marinos | 0-1 | Kashiwa Reysol | International Stadium Yokohama |
| JST (UTC+09) |

| 27 March 1999 1-4 | Kashiwa Reysol | 1-2 (GG) (a.e.t.) | Shimizu S-Pulse | Hitachi Kashiwa Soccer Stadium |
| JST (UTC+09) |

| 3 April 1999 1-5 | Cerezo Osaka | 3-0 | Kashiwa Reysol | Osaka Nagai Stadium |
| JST (UTC+09) |

| 10 April 1999 1-6 | Kashiwa Reysol | 0-1 | Júbilo Iwata | Hitachi Kashiwa Soccer Stadium |
| JST (UTC+09) |

| 19 May 1999 1-7 | Kashima Antlers | 1-2 | Kashiwa Reysol | Tokyo National Stadium |
| JST (UTC+09) |

| 24 April 1999 1-8 | Kashiwa Reysol | 3-1 | Urawa Red Diamonds | Kashiwanoha Park Stadium |
| JST (UTC+09) |

| 28 April 1999 1-9 | Nagoya Grampus Eight | 0-1 (GG) (a.e.t.) | Kashiwa Reysol | Mizuho Athletic Stadium |
| JST (UTC+09) |

| 1 May 1999 1-10 | Kashiwa Reysol | 4-2 | Gamba Osaka | Hitachi Kashiwa Soccer Stadium |
| JST (UTC+09) |

| 5 May 1999 1-11 | JEF United Ichihara | 2-5 | Kashiwa Reysol | Ichihara Seaside Stadium |
| JST (UTC+09) |

| 8 May 1999 1-12 | Kashiwa Reysol | 1-0 | Vissel Kobe | Hitachi Kashiwa Soccer Stadium |
| JST (UTC+09) |

| 15 May 1999 1-13 | Sanfrecce Hiroshima | 3-1 | Kashiwa Reysol | Hiroshima Stadium |
| JST (UTC+09) |

| 22 May 1999 1-14 | Kashiwa Reysol | 0-1 | Verdy Kawasaki | Kashiwanoha Park Stadium |
| JST (UTC+09) |

| 29 May 1999 1-15 | Bellmare Hiratsuka | 1-2 | Kashiwa Reysol | Hiratsuka Athletics Stadium |
| JST (UTC+09) |

| 7 August 1999 2-1 | Kashiwa Reysol | 2-1 | Kashima Antlers | Kashiwanoha Park Stadium |
| JST (UTC+09) |

| 14 August 1999 2-2 | Urawa Red Diamonds | 2-3 (GG) (a.e.t.) | Kashiwa Reysol | Urawa Komaba Stadium |
| JST (UTC+09) |

| 18 August 1999 2-3 | Kashiwa Reysol | 1-2 | Nagoya Grampus Eight | Tokyo National Stadium |
| JST (UTC+09) |

| 21 August 1999 2-4 | Gamba Osaka | 1-0 | Kashiwa Reysol | Osaka Expo '70 Stadium |
| JST (UTC+09) |

| 28 August 1999 2-5 | Kashiwa Reysol | 2-0 | JEF United Ichihara | Hitachi Kashiwa Soccer Stadium |
| JST (UTC+09) |

| 4 September 1999 2-6 | Vissel Kobe | 0-2 | Kashiwa Reysol | Kobe Universiade Memorial Stadium |
| JST (UTC+09) |

| 11 September 1999 2-7 | Kashiwa Reysol | 0-4 | Sanfrecce Hiroshima | Hitachi Kashiwa Soccer Stadium |
| JST (UTC+09) |

| 15 September 1999 2-8 | Verdy Kawasaki | 1-3 | Kashiwa Reysol | Todoroki Athletics Stadium |
| JST (UTC+09) |

| 18 September 1999 2-9 | Kashiwa Reysol | 1-0 | Bellmare Hiratsuka | Hitachi Kashiwa Soccer Stadium |
| JST (UTC+09) |

| 22 September 1999 2-10 | Kyoto Purple Sanga | 1-2 (GG) (a.e.t.) | Kashiwa Reysol | Nishikyogoku Athletic Stadium |
| JST (UTC+09) |

| 30 October 1999 2-11 | Kashiwa Reysol | 1-1 (GG) (a.e.t.) | Yokohama F. Marinos | Kashiwanoha Park Stadium |
| JST (UTC+09) |

| 17 November 1999 2-12 | Kashiwa Reysol | 3-1 | Avispa Fukuoka | Hitachi Kashiwa Soccer Stadium |
| JST (UTC+09) |

| 27 October 1999 2-13 | Júbilo Iwata | 0-1 | Kashiwa Reysol | Júbilo Iwata Stadium |
| JST (UTC+09) |

| 23 November 1999 2-14 | Kashiwa Reysol | 0-3 | Cerezo Osaka | Hitachi Kashiwa Soccer Stadium |
| JST (UTC+09) |

| 27 November 1999 2-15 | Shimizu S-Pulse | 1-2 | Kashiwa Reysol | Nihondaira Sports Stadium |
| JST (UTC+09) |

=== Emperor's Cup ===
| 1st Round | bye |

| 2nd Round | bye |

| 12 December 1999 3rd Round | Kashiwa Reysol | 4-2 | Denso | Hitachi Kashiwa Soccer Stadium |
| JST (UTC+09) |

| 19 December 1999 4th Round | Urawa Red Diamonds | 0-2 | Kashiwa Reysol | Urawa Komaba Stadium |
| JST (UTC+09) |

| 23 December 1999 Quarterfinals | Montedio Yamagata | 0-2 | Kashiwa Reysol | Kobe Universiade Memorial Stadium |
| JST (UTC+09) |

| 26 December 1999 Semifinals | Nagoya Grampus Eight | 2-0 | Kashiwa Reysol | Tokyo National Stadium |
| JST (UTC+09) |

=== J.League Cup ===
| 7 April 1999 1st Round-1 | Albirex Niigata | 0-3 | Kashiwa Reysol | Niigata City Athletic Stadium |
| JST (UTC+09) |

| 14 April 1999 1st Round-2 | Kashiwa Reysol | 2-0 (5-0 agg.) | Albirex Niigata | Hitachi Kashiwa Soccer Stadium |
| JST (UTC+09) |

| 12 June 1999 2nd Round-1 | Cerezo Osaka | 0-2 | Kashiwa Reysol | Osaka Nagai Stadium |
| JST (UTC+09) |

| 19 June 1999 2nd Round-2 | Kashiwa Reysol | 1-2 (GG) (a.e.t.) (3-2 agg.) | Cerezo Osaka | Hitachi Kashiwa Soccer Stadium |
| JST (UTC+09) |

| 20 July 1999 Quarterfinals-1 | Kashiwa Reysol | 1-1 | Júbilo Iwata | Hitachi Kashiwa Soccer Stadium |
| JST (UTC+09) |

| 24 July 1999 Quarterfinals-2 | Júbilo Iwata | 0-2 (1-3 agg.) | Kashiwa Reysol | Kagoshima Kamoike Stadium |
| JST (UTC+09) |

| 29 September 1999 Semifinals-1 | Nagoya Grampus Eight | 1-3 | Kashiwa Reysol | Mizuho Athletic Stadium |
| JST (UTC+09) |

| 6 October 1999 Semifinals-2 | Kashiwa Reysol | 1-2 (GG) (a.e.t.) (4-3 agg.) | Nagoya Grampus Eight | Hitachi Kashiwa Soccer Stadium |
| JST (UTC+09) |

| 3 November 1999 Final | Kashiwa Reysol | 2-2 (GG) (a.e.t.) (5-4 p) | Kashima Antlers | Tokyo National Stadium |
| JST (UTC+09) | | J.League |

== Player statistics ==
| No. | Pos. | Nat. | Player | D.o.B. (Age) | Height / Weight | J.League 1 | | Emperor's Cup | | J.League Cup | | Total | |
| No. | Pos. | Nat. | Player | D.o.B. (Age) | Height / Weight | Apps | Goals | Apps | Goals | Apps | Goals | Apps | Goals |
|---|---|---|---|---|---|---|---|---|---|---|---|---|---|
| 1 | GK | (Japan) | Yoichi Doi | July 25, 1973 (aged 25) | cm / kg | 3 | 0 | | | | | | |
| 2 | DF | (Japan) | Shigenori Hagimura | July 31, 1976 (aged 22) | cm / kg | 17 | 0 | | | | | | |
| 3 | DF | (Japan) | Norihiro Satsukawa | April 18, 1972 (aged 26) | cm / kg | 28 | 0 | | | | | | |
| 4 | DF | (Japan) | Takeshi Watanabe | September 10, 1972 (aged 26) | cm / kg | 28 | 0 | | | | | | |
| 5 | MF | (Japan) | Takahiro Shimotaira | December 18, 1971 (aged 27) | cm / kg | 30 | 2 | | | | | | |
| 6 | MF | (Japan) | Masahiko Kumagai | November 23, 1975 (aged 23) | cm / kg | 1 | 0 | | | | | | |
| 7 | FW | (Brazil) | Bentinho | December 18, 1971 (aged 27) | cm / kg | 19 | 10 | | | | | | |
| 8 | FW | (Bulgaria) | Hristo Stoichkov | February 8, 1966 (aged 33) | cm / kg | 11 | 4 | | | | | | |
| 8 | MF | (Romania) | Pavel Badea | June 10, 1967 (aged 31) | cm / kg | 10 | 0 | | | | | | |
| 9 | FW | (Japan) | Hideaki Kitajima | May 23, 1978 (aged 20) | cm / kg | 17 | 7 | | | | | | |
| 10 | MF | (Japan) | Harutaka Ono | May 12, 1978 (aged 20) | cm / kg | 12 | 1 | | | | | | |
| 11 | MF | (Japan) | Nozomu Kato | October 7, 1969 (aged 29) | cm / kg | 30 | 9 | | | | | | |
| 12 | MF | (Japan) | Naoki Sakai | August 2, 1975 (aged 23) | cm / kg | 24 | 2 | | | | | | |
| 13 | MF | (Japan) | Mitsuteru Watanabe | April 10, 1974 (aged 24) | cm / kg | 19 | 2 | | | | | | |
| 14 | DF | (Japan) | Takumi Morikawa | July 11, 1977 (aged 21) | cm / kg | 0 | 0 | | | | | | |
| 15 | MF | (Japan) | Makoto Sunakawa | August 10, 1977 (aged 21) | cm / kg | 15 | 0 | | | | | | |
| 16 | GK | (Japan) | Dai Sato | August 16, 1971 (aged 27) | cm / kg | 0 | 0 | | | | | | |
| 17 | MF | (Japan) | Tomokazu Myojin | January 24, 1978 (aged 21) | cm / kg | 30 | 1 | | | | | | |
| 18 | DF | (Japan) | Tomohiro Katanosaka | April 18, 1971 (aged 27) | cm / kg | 15 | 3 | | | | | | |
| 19 | DF | (Japan) | Toru Irie | July 8, 1977 (aged 21) | cm / kg | 1 | 0 | | | | | | |
| 20 | DF | (South Korea) | Hong Myung-Bo | February 12, 1969 (aged 30) | cm / kg | 28 | 5 | | | | | | |
| 21 | GK | (Japan) | Yuta Minami | September 30, 1979 (aged 19) | cm / kg | 18 | 0 | | | | | | |
| 22 | GK | (Japan) | Motohiro Yoshida | August 25, 1974 (aged 24) | cm / kg | 11 | 0 | | | | | | |
| 23 | DF | (Japan) | Kensuke Nebiki | September 7, 1977 (aged 21) | cm / kg | 1 | 0 | | | | | | |
| 24 | MF | (Japan) | Tomonori Hirayama | January 9, 1978 (aged 21) | cm / kg | 16 | 2 | | | | | | |
| 25 | MF | (Japan) | Shinya Yabusaki | June 1, 1978 (aged 20) | cm / kg | 0 | 0 | | | | | | |
| 26 | FW | (Japan) | Taro Hasegawa | August 17, 1979 (aged 19) | cm / kg | 13 | 0 | | | | | | |
| 27 | MF | (Japan) | Shinya Tanoue | February 5, 1980 (aged 19) | cm / kg | 0 | 0 | | | | | | |
| 28 | FW | (Japan) | Keiji Tamada | April 11, 1980 (aged 18) | cm / kg | 5 | 0 | | | | | | |
| 29 | DF | (Japan) | Arata Sugiyama | July 25, 1980 (aged 18) | cm / kg | 0 | 0 | | | | | | |

== Other pages ==
- (in Japanese) J.League official site
