= 1998 Kashiwa Reysol season =

Kashiwa Reysol
1998 season
- Manager: Akira Nishino
- Stadium: Hitachi Kashiwa Soccer Stadium
- J.League: 8th
- Emperor's Cup: 4th Round
- J.League Cup: GL-B 2nd
- Top goalscorer: Bentinho (13)
Home colours	Away colours

1998 Kashiwa Reysol season

== Competitions ==
Competitions	Position
J.League	8th / 18 clubs
Emperor's Cup	4th Round
J.League Cup	GL-B 2nd / 5 clubs

== Domestic results ==
=== J.League ===
21 March 1998 1-1	Kashiwa Reysol	0-1	Sanfrecce Hiroshima	Hitachi Kashiwa Soccer Stadium
JST (UTC+09)

25 March 1998 1-2	Avispa Fukuoka	0-0 (GG) (a.e.t.) (3-4 p)	Kashiwa Reysol	Hakatanomori Football Stadium
JST (UTC+09)

28 March 1998 1-3	Kashiwa Reysol	1-1 (GG) (a.e.t.) (5-4 p)	Consadole Sapporo	Hitachi Kashiwa Soccer Stadium
JST (UTC+09)

4 April 1998 1-4	Shimizu S-Pulse	0-2	Kashiwa Reysol	Nihondaira Sports Stadium
JST (UTC+09)

11 April 1998 1-5	Kashiwa Reysol	3-2	Kashima Antlers	Tokyo National Stadium
JST (UTC+09)

15 April 1998 1-6	Kashiwa Reysol	3-2 (GG) (a.e.t.)	Kyoto Purple Sanga	Hitachi Kashiwa Soccer Stadium
JST (UTC+09)

18 April 1998 1-7	Gamba Osaka	3-1	Kashiwa Reysol	Osaka Expo '70 Stadium
JST (UTC+09)

25 April 1998 1-8	Kashiwa Reysol	0-4	Yokohama Marinos	Hitachi Kashiwa Soccer Stadium
JST (UTC+09)

29 April 1998 1-9	Urawa Red Diamonds	3-1	Kashiwa Reysol	Tokyo National Stadium
JST (UTC+09)

2 May 1998 1-10	Kashiwa Reysol	2-3 (GG) (a.e.t.)	Nagoya Grampus Eight	Hitachi Kashiwa Soccer Stadium
JST (UTC+09)

5 May 1998 1-11	Bellmare Hiratsuka	1-3	Kashiwa Reysol	Hiratsuka Athletics Stadium
JST (UTC+09)

9 May 1998 1-12	Kashiwa Reysol	1-3	Júbilo Iwata	Hitachi Kashiwa Soccer Stadium
JST (UTC+09)

25 July 1998 1-13	Verdy Kawasaki	1-3	Kashiwa Reysol	Todoroki Athletics Stadium
JST (UTC+09)

29 July 1998 1-14	Kashiwa Reysol	4-0	Vissel Kobe	Hitachi Kashiwa Soccer Stadium
JST (UTC+09)

1 August 1998 1-15	JEF United Ichihara	3-0	Kashiwa Reysol	Ichihara Seaside Stadium
JST (UTC+09)

5 August 1998 1-16	Kashiwa Reysol	1-3	Yokohama Flügels	Hitachi Kashiwa Soccer Stadium
JST (UTC+09)

8 August 1998 1-17	Cerezo Osaka	5-7	Kashiwa Reysol	Osaka Nagai Stadium
JST (UTC+09)

22 August 1998 2-1	Vissel Kobe	0-2	Kashiwa Reysol	Kobe Universiade Memorial Stadium
JST (UTC+09)

29 August 1998 2-2	Kashiwa Reysol	1-0	JEF United Ichihara	Hitachi Kashiwa Soccer Stadium
JST (UTC+09)

5 September 1998 2-3	Yokohama Flügels	1-2	Kashiwa Reysol	International Stadium Yokohama
JST (UTC+09)

12 September 1998 2-4	Kashiwa Reysol	3-1	Cerezo Osaka	Hitachi Kashiwa Soccer Stadium
JST (UTC+09)

15 September 1998 2-5	Sanfrecce Hiroshima	0-0 (GG) (a.e.t.) (8-9 p)	Kashiwa Reysol	Hiroshima Big Arch
JST (UTC+09)

19 September 1998 2-6	Kashiwa Reysol	1-2 (GG) (a.e.t.)	Avispa Fukuoka	Hitachi Kashiwa Soccer Stadium
JST (UTC+09)

23 September 1998 2-7	Consadole Sapporo	3-2	Kashiwa Reysol	Sapporo Atsubetsu Park Stadium
JST (UTC+09)

26 September 1998 2-8	Kashiwa Reysol	1-2	Shimizu S-Pulse	Hitachi Kashiwa Soccer Stadium
JST (UTC+09)

3 October 1998 2-9	Kashima Antlers	3-0	Kashiwa Reysol	Kashima Soccer Stadium
JST (UTC+09)

14 October 1998 2-10	Kyoto Purple Sanga	2-2 (GG) (a.e.t.) (5-3 p)	Kashiwa Reysol	Nishikyogoku Athletic Stadium
JST (UTC+09)

17 October 1998 2-11	Kashiwa Reysol	2-0	Gamba Osaka	Hitachi Kashiwa Soccer Stadium
JST (UTC+09)

21 October 1998 2-12	Yokohama Marinos	0-1	Kashiwa Reysol	Yokohama Mitsuzawa Stadium
JST (UTC+09)

24 October 1998 2-13	Kashiwa Reysol	2-0	Urawa Red Diamonds	Tokyo National Stadium
JST (UTC+09)

31 October 1998 2-14	Nagoya Grampus Eight	4-2	Kashiwa Reysol	Gifu Nagaragawa Stadium
JST (UTC+09)

3 November 1998 2-15	Kashiwa Reysol	1-3	Bellmare Hiratsuka	Hitachi Kashiwa Soccer Stadium
JST (UTC+09)

7 November 1998 2-16	Júbilo Iwata	4-0	Kashiwa Reysol	Júbilo Iwata Stadium
JST (UTC+09)

14 November 1998 2-17	Kashiwa Reysol	2-1	Verdy Kawasaki	Hitachi Kashiwa Soccer Stadium
JST (UTC+09)

=== Emperor's Cup ===
1st Round	bye

2nd Round	bye

13 December 1998 3rd Round	Kashiwa Reysol	3-1	Sagan Tosu	Hitachi Kashiwa Soccer Stadium
JST (UTC+09)

20 December 1998 4th Round	Urawa Red Diamonds	3-1	Kashiwa Reysol	Urawa Komaba Stadium
JST (UTC+09)

=== J.League Cup ===
16 May 1998 GL-B-1	Cerezo Osaka	2-3	Kashiwa Reysol	Osaka Nagai Stadium
JST (UTC+09)

23 May 1998 GL-B-2	Avispa Fukuoka	2-3	Kashiwa Reysol	Hakatanomori Football Stadium
JST (UTC+09)

30 May 1998 GL-B-3	Kashiwa Reysol	1-1	Kashima Antlers	Hitachi Kashiwa Soccer Stadium
JST (UTC+09)

GL-B-4	bye

6 June 1998 GL-B-5	Kashiwa Reysol	5-2	Yokohama Marinos	Hitachi Kashiwa Soccer Stadium
JST (UTC+09)

== Player statistics ==
No.	Pos.	Nat.	Player	D.o.B. (Age)	Height / Weight	J.League		Emperor's Cup		J.League Cup		Total	
No.	Pos.	Nat.	Player	D.o.B. (Age)	Height / Weight	Apps	Goals	Apps	Goals	Apps	Goals	Apps	Goals
1	GK	(Japan)	Yoichi Doi	July 25, 1973 (aged 24)	cm / kg	8	0						
2	DF	(Japan)	Kentaro Sawada	May 15, 1970 (aged 27)	cm / kg	30	1						
3	DF	(Brazil)	Marcão	December 20, 1965 (aged 32)	cm / kg	1	0						
4	DF	(Japan)	Takeshi Watanabe	September 10, 1972 (aged 25)	cm / kg	33	2						
5	MF	(Japan)	Takahiro Shimotaira	December 18, 1971 (aged 26)	cm / kg	25	0						
6	DF	(Japan)	Kentaro Ishikawa	February 12, 1970 (aged 28)	cm / kg	2	0						
7	FW	(Brazil)	Elpídio Silva	July 19, 1975 (aged 22)	cm / kg	10	2						
7	FW	(Brazil)	Bentinho	December 18, 1971 (aged 26)	cm / kg	19	13						
8	MF	(Japan)	Shin Tanada	July 25, 1969 (aged 28)	cm / kg	5	0						
9	FW	(Brazil)	Duda	March 15, 1974 (aged 24)	cm / kg	5	3						
10	FW	(Brazil)	Basílio	July 14, 1972 (aged 25)	cm / kg	27	6						
11	MF	(Japan)	Nozomu Kato	October 7, 1969 (aged 28)	cm / kg	34	8						
12	MF	(Japan)	Naoki Sakai	August 2, 1975 (aged 22)	cm / kg	27	5						
13	MF	(Japan)	Harutaka Ono	May 12, 1978 (aged 19)	cm / kg	28	2						
14	DF	(Japan)	Shigenori Hagimura	July 31, 1976 (aged 21)	cm / kg	26	1						
15	DF	(Japan)	Takashi Kojima	August 4, 1973 (aged 24)	cm / kg	1	0						
16	MF	(Japan)	Mitsuteru Watanabe	April 10, 1974 (aged 23)	cm / kg	15	3						
17	MF	(Japan)	Tomokazu Myojin	January 24, 1978 (aged 20)	cm / kg	28	0						
18	DF	(Japan)	Tomohiro Katanosaka	April 18, 1971 (aged 26)	cm / kg	27	0						
19	FW	(Japan)	Hideaki Kitajima	May 23, 1978 (aged 19)	cm / kg	9	2						
20	GK	(Japan)	Dai Sato	August 16, 1971 (aged 26)	cm / kg	4	0						
21	GK	(Japan)	Yuta Minami	September 30, 1979 (aged 18)	cm / kg	22	0						
22	GK	(Japan)	Motohiro Yoshida	August 25, 1974 (aged 23)	cm / kg	0	0						
23	MF	(Japan)	Masahiko Kumagai	November 23, 1975 (aged 22)	cm / kg	0	0						
24	DF	(Japan)	Toru Irie	July 8, 1977 (aged 20)	cm / kg	19	0						
25	MF	(Japan)	Makoto Sunakawa	August 10, 1977 (aged 20)	cm / kg	0	0						
26	DF	(Japan)	Kensuke Nebiki	September 7, 1977 (aged 20)	cm / kg	0	0						
27	DF	(Japan)	Takumi Morikawa	July 11, 1977 (aged 20)	cm / kg	20	0						
28	MF	(Japan)	Tomonori Hirayama	January 9, 1978 (aged 20)	cm / kg	0	0						
29	FW	(Japan)	Taro Hasegawa	August 17, 1979 (aged 18)	cm / kg	1	0						
30	MF	(Japan)	Shinya Tanoue	February 5, 1980 (aged 18)	cm / kg	0	0						
31	FW	(Bulgaria)	Hristo Stoichkov	February 8, 1966 (aged 32)	cm / kg	16	8						
32	FW	(Brazil)	Buiu (footballer, born 1980)	May 5, 1980 (aged 17)	cm / kg	3	0						
33	MF	(Japan)	Shinya Yabusaki	June 1, 1978 (aged 19)	cm / kg	0	0						

== Other pages ==
- (in Japanese) J.League official site
