= Harutaka Ono =

Japanese footballer

Harutaka Ono 大野 敏隆
Personal information
- Full name: Harutaka Ono
- Date of birth: May 12, 1978 (age 48)
- Place of birth: Saitama, Japan
- Height: 1.73 m (5 ft 8 in)
- Position: Midfielder

Youth career
- 1994–1996: Maebashi Commercial High School

Senior career*
Years	Team	Apps	(Gls)
1997–2005	Kashiwa Reysol	155	(19)
2003	→Kyoto Purple Sanga (loan)	12	(0)
2004	→Nagoya Grampus Eight (loan)	10	(0)
2006–2008	Tokyo Verdy	70	(6)
Total		247	(25)

International career
1997	Japan U-20	5	(2)
Medal record
Kashiwa Reysol
Winner	J.League Cup	1999
- * Club domestic league appearances and goals

Harutaka Ono (大野 敏隆, Ono Harutaka; born May 12, 1978) is a former Japanese football player.

== Club career ==
Ono was born in Saitama Prefecture on May 12, 1978. After graduating from high school, he joined Kashiwa Reysol in 1997. He played many matches as offensive midfielder from 1998. At 1999 J.League Cup, he scored a goal at Final and the club won the champions. The club also won the 3rd place 1999 and 2000 J1 League. However his opportunity to play decreased in 2003, he moved to Kyoto Purple Sanga in June 2003 and Nagoya Grampus Eight in 2004. In September 2004, he returned to Kashiwa Reysol club results is bad. However the club was relegated to J2 League end of 2005 season. He moved to J2 League club Tokyo Verdy in 2006 and became a captain of the club. The club won the 2nd place in 2007 and was promoted to J1 League. However his opportunity to play decreased in 2008 and he retired end of 2008 season.

== National team career ==
In June 1997, Ono was selected Japan U-20 national team for 1997 World Youth Championship. At this tournament, he played all 5 matches as offensive midfielder and scored 2 goals against Costa Rica.

== Club statistics ==
Club performance			League		Cup		League Cup		Continental		Total	
Season	Club	League	Apps	Goals	Apps	Goals	Apps	Goals	Apps	Goals	Apps	Goals
Japan			League		Emperor's Cup		J.League Cup		Asia		Total	
1997	Kashiwa Reysol	J1 League	7	0	0	0	0	0	-		7	0
1998	Kashiwa Reysol	J1 League	28	2	0	0	2	0	-		30	2
1999	Kashiwa Reysol	J1 League	12	1	3	1	8	1	-		23	3
2000	Kashiwa Reysol	J1 League	27	4	2	0	2	1	-		31	5
2001	Kashiwa Reysol	J1 League	26	9	1	1	3	0	-		30	10
2002	Kashiwa Reysol	J1 League	22	2	0	0	6	2	-		28	4
2003	Kashiwa Reysol	J1 League	3	0	0	0	1	0	-		4	0
2003	Kyoto Purple Sanga	J1 League	12	0	1	0	1	0	-		14	0
2004	Nagoya Grampus Eight	J1 League	10	0	0	0	4	0	-		14	0
2004	Kashiwa Reysol	J1 League	12	0	0	0	0	0	-		12	0
2005	Kashiwa Reysol	J1 League	18	1	2	0	5	1	-		25	2
2006	Tokyo Verdy	J2 League	21	3	0	0	-		2	0	23	3
2007	Tokyo Verdy	J2 League	34	3	0	0	-		-		34	3
2008	Tokyo Verdy	J1 League	15	0	0	0	4	0	-		19	0
Total			247	25	11	2	41	6	2	0	301	33
