= 2001 Kashiwa Reysol season =

Kashiwa Reysol
2001 season
- Manager: Akira Nishino; Steve Perryman
- Stadium: Hitachi Kashiwa Soccer Stadium
- J.League 1: 6th
- Emperor's Cup: 3rd Round
- J.League Cup: 2nd Round
- Top goalscorer: Hwang Sun-hong (10)
Home colours	Away colours

2001 Kashiwa Reysol season

== Competitions ==
Competitions	Position
J.League 1	6th / 16 clubs
Emperor's Cup	3rd round
J.League Cup	2nd round

== Domestic results ==
=== J.League 1 ===
10 March 2001 1-1	Kashiwa Reysol	2-1	Shimizu S-Pulse	Hitachi Kashiwa Soccer Stadium
JST (UTC+09)

17 March 2001 1-2	Consadole Sapporo	2-1	Kashiwa Reysol	Kochi Haruno Athletic Stadium
JST (UTC+09)

31 March 2001 1-3	JEF United Ichihara	2-3 (GG) (a.e.t.)	Kashiwa Reysol	Ichihara Seaside Stadium
JST (UTC+09)

7 April 2001 1-4	Kashiwa Reysol	2-1 (GG) (a.e.t.)	Sanfrecce Hiroshima	Hitachi Kashiwa Soccer Stadium
JST (UTC+09)

14 April 2001 1-5	Tokyo Verdy 1969	1-0	Kashiwa Reysol	Tokyo Stadium
JST (UTC+09)

29 April 2001 1-6	Kashiwa Reysol	5-1	Vissel Kobe	Hitachi Kashiwa Soccer Stadium
JST (UTC+09)

3 May 2001 1-7	Gamba Osaka	3-2 (GG) (a.e.t.)	Kashiwa Reysol	Osaka Expo '70 Stadium
JST (UTC+09)

6 May 2001 1-8	Yokohama F. Marinos	0-2	Kashiwa Reysol	International Stadium Yokohama
JST (UTC+09)

12 May 2001 1-9	Kashiwa Reysol	0-2	FC Tokyo	Hitachi Kashiwa Soccer Stadium
JST (UTC+09)

19 May 2001 1-10	Kashima Antlers	3-2 (GG) (a.e.t.)	Kashiwa Reysol	Kashima Soccer Stadium
JST (UTC+09)

16 June 2001 1-11	Kashiwa Reysol	0-1	Júbilo Iwata	Kashiwanoha Park Stadium
JST (UTC+09)

23 June 2001 1-12	Nagoya Grampus Eight	1-4	Kashiwa Reysol	Mizuho Athletic Stadium
JST (UTC+09)

7 July 2001 1-13	Kashiwa Reysol	3-2	Urawa Red Diamonds	Tokyo National Stadium
JST (UTC+09)

14 July 2001 1-14	Cerezo Osaka	3-2	Kashiwa Reysol	Osaka Nagai Stadium
JST (UTC+09)

21 July 2001 1-15	Kashiwa Reysol	1-0	Avispa Fukuoka	Kashiwanoha Park Stadium
JST (UTC+09)

11 August 2001 2-1	FC Tokyo	2-2 (GG) (a.e.t.)	Kashiwa Reysol	Tokyo Stadium
JST (UTC+09)

18 August 2001 2-2	Kashiwa Reysol	0-1	Yokohama F. Marinos	Kashiwanoha Park Stadium
JST (UTC+09)

25 August 2001 2-3	Avispa Fukuoka	2-5	Kashiwa Reysol	Hakatanomori Football Stadium
JST (UTC+09)

8 September 2001 2-4	Kashiwa Reysol	5-1	Cerezo Osaka	Hitachi Kashiwa Soccer Stadium
JST (UTC+09)

15 September 2001 2-5	Kashiwa Reysol	0-1	Gamba Osaka	Hitachi Kashiwa Soccer Stadium
JST (UTC+09)

22 September 2001 2-6	Vissel Kobe	1-1 (GG) (a.e.t.)	Kashiwa Reysol	Kobe Universiade Memorial Stadium
JST (UTC+09)

29 September 2001 2-7	Kashiwa Reysol	1-1 (GG) (a.e.t.)	Tokyo Verdy 1969	Hitachi Kashiwa Soccer Stadium
JST (UTC+09)

13 October 2001 2-8	Sanfrecce Hiroshima	2-4	Kashiwa Reysol	Hiroshima Stadium
JST (UTC+09)

17 October 2001 2-9	Kashiwa Reysol	3-4	JEF United Ichihara	Hitachi Kashiwa Soccer Stadium
JST (UTC+09)

20 October 2001 2-10	Kashiwa Reysol	0-1	Kashima Antlers	Kashiwanoha Park Stadium
JST (UTC+09)

31 October 2001 2-11	Júbilo Iwata	1-3	Kashiwa Reysol	Júbilo Iwata Stadium
JST (UTC+09)

3 November 2001 2-12	Kashiwa Reysol	3-2	Nagoya Grampus Eight	Hitachi Kashiwa Soccer Stadium
JST (UTC+09)

10 November 2001 2-13	Urawa Red Diamonds	3-1	Kashiwa Reysol	Saitama Stadium 2002
JST (UTC+09)

17 November 2001 2-14	Kashiwa Reysol	1-0	Consadole Sapporo	Hitachi Kashiwa Soccer Stadium
JST (UTC+09)

24 November 2001 2-15	Shimizu S-Pulse	1-0	Kashiwa Reysol	Nihondaira Sports Stadium
JST (UTC+09)

=== Emperor's Cup ===
1st Round	bye

2nd Round	bye

9 December 2001 3rd Round	Kashiwa Reysol	1-2	Sagan Tosu	Hitachi Kashiwa Soccer Stadium
JST (UTC+09)

=== J.League Cup ===
4 April 2001 1st Round-1	Shonan Bellmare	0-1	Kashiwa Reysol	Hiratsuka Athletics Stadium
JST (UTC+09)

18 April 2001 1st Round-2	Kashiwa Reysol	0-0 (1-0 agg.)	Shonan Bellmare	Hitachi Kashiwa Soccer Stadium
JST (UTC+09)

13 June 2001 2nd Round-1	Kashiwa Reysol	3-1	Kashima Antlers	Kashiwanoha Park Stadium
JST (UTC+09)

20 June 2001 2nd Round-2	Kashima Antlers	4-0 (5-3 agg.)	Kashiwa Reysol	Kashima Soccer Stadium
JST (UTC+09)

== Player statistics ==
No.	Pos.	Nat.	Player	D.o.B. (Age)	Height / Weight	J.League 1		Emperor's Cup		J.League Cup		Total	
No.	Pos.	Nat.	Player	D.o.B. (Age)	Height / Weight	Apps	Goals	Apps	Goals	Apps	Goals	Apps	Goals
1	GK	(Japan)	Yuta Minami	September 30, 1979 (aged 21)	cm / kg	29	0						
2	DF	(Japan)	Shigenori Hagimura	July 31, 1976 (aged 24)	cm / kg	19	1						
3	DF	(Japan)	Norihiro Satsukawa	April 18, 1972 (aged 28)	cm / kg	26	1						
4	DF	(Japan)	Takeshi Watanabe	September 10, 1972 (aged 28)	cm / kg	29	3						
5	DF	(Japan)	Sota Nakazawa	October 26, 1982 (aged 18)	cm / kg	1	0						
6	MF	(Japan)	Tomonori Hirayama	January 9, 1978 (aged 23)	cm / kg	29	3						
7	MF	(Japan)	Tomokazu Myojin	January 24, 1978 (aged 23)	cm / kg	29	0						
8	MF	(South Korea)	Yoo Sang-Chul	October 18, 1971 (aged 29)	cm / kg	24	9						
9	FW	(Japan)	Hideaki Kitajima	May 23, 1978 (aged 22)	cm / kg	28	7						
10	MF	(Japan)	Harutaka Ono	May 12, 1978 (aged 22)	cm / kg	26	9						
11	MF	(Japan)	Nozomu Kato	October 7, 1969 (aged 31)	cm / kg	22	4						
12	MF	(Japan)	Naoki Sakai	August 2, 1975 (aged 25)	cm / kg	12	1						
13	MF	(Japan)	Mitsuteru Watanabe	April 10, 1974 (aged 26)	cm / kg	28	4						
14	DF	(Japan)	Masayuki Ochiai	July 11, 1981 (aged 19)	cm / kg	0	0						
15	MF	(Japan)	Makoto Sunakawa	August 10, 1977 (aged 23)	cm / kg	23	1						
16	GK	(Japan)	Dai Sato	August 16, 1971 (aged 29)	cm / kg	1	0						
17	MF	(Japan)	Shunta Nagai	July 12, 1982 (aged 18)	cm / kg	0	0						
18	FW	(South Korea)	Hwang Sun-hong	July 14, 1968 (aged 32)	cm / kg	21	10						
19	DF	(Japan)	Toru Irie	July 8, 1977 (aged 23)	cm / kg	4	0						
20	DF	(South Korea)	Hong Myung-bo	February 12, 1969 (aged 32)	cm / kg	15	0						
21	GK	(Japan)	Kenta Shimizu	September 18, 1981 (aged 19)	cm / kg	0	0						
22	GK	(Japan)	Motohiro Yoshida	August 25, 1974 (aged 26)	cm / kg	0	0						
23	DF	(Japan)	Kensuke Nebiki	September 7, 1977 (aged 23)	cm / kg	21	0						
24	DF	(Japan)	Arata Sugiyama	July 25, 1980 (aged 20)	cm / kg	4	0						
25	MF	(Japan)	Shinya Yabusaki	June 1, 1978 (aged 22)	cm / kg	0	0						
26	FW	(Japan)	Taro Hasegawa	August 17, 1979 (aged 21)	cm / kg	2	1						
27	MF	(Japan)	Shinya Tanoue	February 5, 1980 (aged 21)	cm / kg	3	2						
28	FW	(Japan)	Keiji Tamada	April 11, 1980 (aged 20)	cm / kg	2	0						
29	FW	(Japan)	Tadamichi Machida	May 23, 1981 (aged 19)	cm / kg	7	2						
30	MF	(Japan)	Shinya Ichikawa	January 19, 1982 (aged 19)	cm / kg	0	0						
31	FW	(Japan)	Taro Sugahara	June 14, 1981 (aged 19)	cm / kg	0	0						
32	MF	(Japan)	Yuma Fujita	August 2, 1982 (aged 18)	cm / kg	0	0						
