= 2000 Kashiwa Reysol season =

Kashiwa Reysol
2000 season
- Manager: Akira Nishino
- Stadium: Hitachi Kashiwa Soccer Stadium
- J.League 1: 3rd
- Emperor's Cup: 4th Round
- J.League Cup: 2nd Round
- Top goalscorer: Hideaki Kitajima (18)
Home colours	Away colours

2000 Kashiwa Reysol season

== Competitions ==
Competitions	Position
J.League 1	3rd / 16 clubs (Note: Although Kashiwa Reysol finished first in the aggregate table, it did not win either of the two stages (nor did second-place finishers Júbilo Iwata) and thus did not advance to the championship playoff.)
Emperor's Cup	4th round
J.League Cup	2nd round

== Domestic results ==
=== J.League 1 ===
11 March 2000 1-1	Júbilo Iwata	0-1 (GG) (a.e.t.)	Kashiwa Reysol	Júbilo Iwata Stadium
JST (UTC+09)

18 March 2000 1-2	Kashiwa Reysol	1-0	Verdy Kawasaki	Hitachi Kashiwa Soccer Stadium
JST (UTC+09)

25 March 2000 1-3	Shimizu S-Pulse	2-1 (GG) (a.e.t.)	Kashiwa Reysol	Nihondaira Sports Stadium
JST (UTC+09)

1 April 2000 1-4	Kashiwa Reysol	3-2 (GG) (a.e.t.)	FC Tokyo	Kashiwanoha Park Stadium
JST (UTC+09)

5 April 2000 1-5	Sanfrecce Hiroshima	1-2	Kashiwa Reysol	Hiroshima Stadium
JST (UTC+09)

8 April 2000 1-6	Kashiwa Reysol	2-1 (GG) (a.e.t.)	Kyoto Purple Sanga	Hitachi Kashiwa Soccer Stadium
JST (UTC+09)

15 April 2000 1-7	Avispa Fukuoka	2-0	Kashiwa Reysol	Hakatanomori Football Stadium
JST (UTC+09)

22 April 2000 1-8	Kashiwa Reysol	3-2 (GG) (a.e.t.)	Yokohama F. Marinos	Kashiwanoha Park Stadium
JST (UTC+09)

29 April 2000 1-9	Cerezo Osaka	4-1	Kashiwa Reysol	Osaka Nagai Stadium
JST (UTC+09)

3 May 2000 1-10	Kashiwa Reysol	2-1	JEF United Ichihara	Hitachi Kashiwa Soccer Stadium
JST (UTC+09)

6 May 2000 1-11	Vissel Kobe	2-0	Kashiwa Reysol	Kobe Universiade Memorial Stadium
JST (UTC+09)

13 May 2000 1-12	Kashiwa Reysol	1-2	Kashima Antlers	Kashiwanoha Park Stadium
JST (UTC+09)

17 May 2000 1-13	Nagoya Grampus Eight	0-2	Kashiwa Reysol	Mizuho Athletic Stadium
JST (UTC+09)

20 May 2000 1-14	Kawasaki Frontale	2-4	Kashiwa Reysol	Todoroki Athletics Stadium
JST (UTC+09)

27 May 2000 1-15	Kashiwa Reysol	2-1	Gamba Osaka	Hitachi Kashiwa Soccer Stadium
JST (UTC+09)

24 June 2000 2-1	Kashiwa Reysol	2-1	Júbilo Iwata	Kashiwanoha Park Stadium
JST (UTC+09)

1 July 2000 2-2	Verdy Kawasaki	1-0	Kashiwa Reysol	Todoroki Athletics Stadium
JST (UTC+09)

8 July 2000 2-3	Kashiwa Reysol	3-2 (GG) (a.e.t.)	Vissel Kobe	Hitachi Kashiwa Soccer Stadium
JST (UTC+09)

15 July 2000 2-4	JEF United Ichihara	1-0	Kashiwa Reysol	Ichihara Seaside Stadium
JST (UTC+09)

22 July 2000 2-5	Kashiwa Reysol	4-0	Cerezo Osaka	Hitachi Kashiwa Soccer Stadium
JST (UTC+09)

26 July 2000 2-6	Yokohama F. Marinos	1-0	Kashiwa Reysol	Yokohama Mitsuzawa Stadium
JST (UTC+09)

29 July 2000 2-7	Kashiwa Reysol	1-0	Avispa Fukuoka	Hitachi Kashiwa Soccer Stadium
JST (UTC+09)

5 August 2000 2-8	FC Tokyo	0-2	Kashiwa Reysol	Ishikawa Kanazawa Stadium
JST (UTC+09)

12 August 2000 2-9	Kashiwa Reysol	1-0	Shimizu S-Pulse	Kashiwanoha Park Stadium
JST (UTC+09)

19 August 2000 2-10	Kyoto Purple Sanga	1-2	Kashiwa Reysol	Nishikyogoku Athletic Stadium
JST (UTC+09)

8 November 2000 2-11	Kashiwa Reysol	2-1 (GG) (a.e.t.)	Sanfrecce Hiroshima	Hitachi Kashiwa Soccer Stadium
JST (UTC+09)

11 November 2000 2-12	Gamba Osaka	1-3	Kashiwa Reysol	Osaka Expo '70 Stadium
JST (UTC+09)

18 November 2000 2-13	Kashiwa Reysol	1-0	Kawasaki Frontale	Hitachi Kashiwa Soccer Stadium
JST (UTC+09)

23 November 2000 2-14	Kashiwa Reysol	2-1	Nagoya Grampus Eight	Hitachi Kashiwa Soccer Stadium
JST (UTC+09)

26 November 2000 2-15	Kashima Antlers	0-0 (GG) (a.e.t.)	Kashiwa Reysol	Tokyo National Stadium
JST (UTC+09)

=== Emperor's Cup ===
1st Round	bye

2nd Round	bye

10 December 2000 3rd Round	Kashiwa Reysol	2-1	Honda	Hitachi Kashiwa Soccer Stadium
JST (UTC+09)

17 December 2000 4th Round	Gamba Osaka	1-1 (GG) (a.e.t.) (10-9 p)	Kashiwa Reysol	Nagasaki Athletic Stadium
JST (UTC+09)

=== J.League Cup ===
1st Round	bye

5 July 2000 2nd Round-1	Kawasaki Frontale	1-0	Kashiwa Reysol	Todoroki Athletics Stadium
JST (UTC+09)

12 July 2000 2nd Round-2	Kashiwa Reysol	1-1 (GG) (a.e.t.) (1-2 agg.)	Kawasaki Frontale	Hitachi Kashiwa Soccer Stadium
JST (UTC+09)

== Player statistics ==
No.	Pos.	Nat.	Player	D.o.B. (Age)	Height / Weight	J.League 1		Emperor's Cup		J.League Cup		Total	
No.	Pos.	Nat.	Player	D.o.B. (Age)	Height / Weight	Apps	Goals	Apps	Goals	Apps	Goals	Apps	Goals
1	GK	(Japan)	Yuta Minami	September 30, 1979 (aged 20)	cm / kg	20	0						
2	DF	(Japan)	Shigenori Hagimura	July 31, 1976 (aged 23)	cm / kg	30	2						
3	DF	(Japan)	Norihiro Satsukawa	April 18, 1972 (aged 27)	cm / kg	28	0						
4	DF	(Japan)	Takeshi Watanabe	September 10, 1972 (aged 27)	cm / kg	30	2						
5	MF	(Japan)	Takahiro Shimotaira	December 18, 1971 (aged 28)	cm / kg	20	0						
6	MF	(Japan)	Tomonori Hirayama	January 9, 1978 (aged 22)	cm / kg	27	3						
7	MF	(Japan)	Tomokazu Myojin	January 24, 1978 (aged 22)	cm / kg	29	2						
8	FW	(Serbia and Montenegro)	Saša Drakulić	August 28, 1972 (aged 27)	cm / kg	2	0						
9	FW	(Japan)	Hideaki Kitajima	May 23, 1978 (aged 21)	cm / kg	30	18						
10	MF	(Japan)	Harutaka Ono	May 12, 1978 (aged 21)	cm / kg	27	4						
11	MF	(Japan)	Nozomu Kato	October 7, 1969 (aged 30)	cm / kg	29	2						
12	MF	(Japan)	Naoki Sakai	August 2, 1975 (aged 24)	cm / kg	15	0						
13	MF	(Japan)	Mitsuteru Watanabe	April 10, 1974 (aged 25)	cm / kg	28	5						
14	DF	(Japan)	Masayuki Ochiai	July 11, 1981 (aged 18)	cm / kg	0	0						
15	MF	(Japan)	Makoto Sunakawa	August 10, 1977 (aged 22)	cm / kg	20	5						
16	GK	(Japan)	Dai Sato	August 16, 1971 (aged 28)	cm / kg	0	0						
17	MF	(Japan)	Shinya Ichikawa	January 19, 1982 (aged 18)	cm / kg	0	0						
18	FW	(Japan)	Tadamichi Machida	May 23, 1981 (aged 18)	cm / kg	0	0						
19	DF	(Japan)	Toru Irie	July 8, 1977 (aged 22)	cm / kg	9	0						
20	DF	(South Korea)	Hong Myung-bo	February 12, 1969 (aged 31)	cm / kg	29	2						
21	GK	(Japan)	Kenta Shimizu	September 18, 1981 (aged 18)	cm / kg	0	0						
22	GK	(Japan)	Motohiro Yoshida	August 25, 1974 (aged 25)	cm / kg	10	0						
23	DF	(Japan)	Kensuke Nebiki	September 7, 1977 (aged 22)	cm / kg	0	0						
24	DF	(Japan)	Arata Sugiyama	July 25, 1980 (aged 19)	cm / kg	0	0						
25	MF	(Japan)	Shinya Yabusaki	June 1, 1978 (aged 21)	cm / kg	1	0						
26	FW	(Japan)	Taro Hasegawa	August 17, 1979 (aged 20)	cm / kg	3	0						
27	MF	(Japan)	Shinya Tanoue	February 5, 1980 (aged 20)	cm / kg	2	0						
28	FW	(Japan)	Keiji Tamada	April 11, 1980 (aged 19)	cm / kg	5	0						
29	FW	(South Korea)	Park Kun-Ha	July 25, 1971 (aged 28)	cm / kg	5	1						
30	MF	(Brazil)	Maurício	July 3, 1978 (aged 21)	cm / kg	3	0						
31	FW	(South Korea)	Hwang Sun-hong	July 14, 1968 (aged 31)	cm / kg	6	1						
