= Bentinho =

Brazilian footballer (born 1971)

Personal information
- Full name: Antônio Bento dos Santos
- Date of birth: 18 December 1971 (age 54)
- Place of birth: Montes Claros, Brazil
- Height: 1.82 m (5 ft 11 1/2 in)
- Position: Striker

Senior career*
Years	Team	Apps	(Gls)
1989–1991	Portuguesa Desportos		
1992	São José		
1993	Portuguesa Desportos		
1994	Al-Hilal		
1994	Verdy Kawasaki		
1995	São Paulo		
1995	Kashiwa Reysol		
1996–1997	Botafogo		
1998	Cruzeiro		
1998–1999	Kashiwa Reysol		
2000	Portuguesa Desportos		
2000	Atlético Paranaense		
2001	Portuguesa Desportos		
2001	Oita Trinita		
2002	Kawasaki Frontale		
2003–2004	Avispa Fukuoka		
- * Club domestic league appearances and goals

Antônio Bento dos Santos (born 18 December 1971), known as just Bentinho, is a former Brazilian football player.

== Club statistics ==
Club performance			League		Cup		League Cup		Total	
Season	Club	League	Apps	Goals	Apps	Goals	Apps	Goals	Apps	Goals
Japan			League		Emperor's Cup		J.League Cup		Total	
1994	Verdy Kawasaki	J1 League	16	13	1	0	3	2	20	15
1995	Kashiwa Reysol	J1 League	14	12	2	0	-		16	12
1998	Kashiwa Reysol	J1 League	19	13	2	0	0	0	21	13
1999	Kashiwa Reysol	J1 League	19	10	0	0	4	2	23	12
2001	Oita Trinita	J2 League	19	16	1	0	1	0	21	16
2002	Kawasaki Frontale	J2 League	36	16	1	4	-		37	20
2003	Avispa Fukuoka	J2 League	41	20	3	2	-		44	22
2004	Avispa Fukuoka	J2 League	20	4	0	0	-		20	4
Career total			184	104	10	6	7	4	201	114
