= Toru Irie =

Japanese footballer (born 1977)

Toru Irie 入江 徹
Personal information
- Full name: Toru Irie
- Date of birth: July 8, 1977 (age 49)
- Place of birth: Shizuoka, Japan
- Height: 1.77 m (5 ft 9 1/2 in)
- Position: Defender

Youth career
- 1993–1995: Shizuoka Kita High School

Senior career*
Years	Team	Apps	(Gls)
1996–2001	Kashiwa Reysol	33	(0)
2002	Vissel Kobe	5	(0)
2003–2007	Gamba Osaka	40	(0)
Total		78	(0)

Managerial career
- 2025: Albirex Niigata
Medal record
Kashiwa Reysol
Winner	J.League Cup	1999
Gamba Osaka
Winner	J1 League	2005
Winner	J.League Cup	2007
Runner-up	J.League Cup	2005
Runner-up	Emperor's Cup	2006
- * Club domestic league appearances and goals

Toru Irie (入江 徹, Irie Toru; born July 8, 1977) is a Japanese football manager and former footballer who was most recently manager of Albirex Niigata.

== Playing career ==
Irie was born in Shizuoka on July 8, 1977. After graduating from high school, he joined Kashiwa Reysol with teammate Tomonori Hirayama in 1996. He debuted in 1998 and played many matches as left defender. However did not play as much in 1999. In 2002, he moved to Vissel Kobe. However he did not play much. In 2003, he moved to Gamba Osaka. He played as left defender and the club won the championship in the 2005 J1 League. He retired at the end of the 2007 season.

== Managerial career ==
Following his retirement, Irie joined the coaching staff of Albirex Niigata in 2008. He was part of the staff for 17 years, coaching various age groups and the ladies team. Following the appointment of Rikizo Matsuhashi in 2022, Irie was named as the head coach at Niigata. In June 2025, Irie was appointed manager of J1 League club Albirex Niigata following the dismissal of Daisuke Kimori.

== Career statistics ==
Appearances and goals by club, season and competition
Club	Season	League			Emperor's Cup		J.League Cup		Total	
Club	Season	Division	Apps	Goals	Apps	Goals	Apps	Goals	Apps	Goals
Kashiwa Reysol	1996	J1 League	0	0	0	0	0	0	0	0
Kashiwa Reysol	1997	J1 League	0	0	0	0	0	0	0	0
Kashiwa Reysol	1998	J1 League	19	0	1	0	4	0	24	0
Kashiwa Reysol	1999	J1 League	1	0	2	0	0	0	3	0
Kashiwa Reysol	2000	J1 League	9	0	0	0	1	0	10	0
Kashiwa Reysol	2001	J1 League	4	0	0	0	1	0	5	0
Vissel Kobe	2002	J1 League	5	0	0	0	0	0	5	0
Gamba Osaka	2003	J1 League	13	0	1	0	3	0	17	0
Gamba Osaka	2004	J1 League	10	0	1	0	3	0	14	0
Gamba Osaka	2005	J1 League	9	0	1	0	5	0	15	0
Gamba Osaka	2006	J1 League	6	0	0	0	0	0	6	0
Gamba Osaka	2007	J1 League	2	0	0	0	1	0	3	0
Career total			78	0	6	0	18	0	102	0
