= Naoki Sakai (footballer) =

Japanese footballer

Naoki Sakai 酒井 直樹
Personal information
- Full name: Naoki Sakai
- Date of birth: August 2, 1975 (age 51)
- Place of birth: Nagareyama, Japan
- Height: 1.75 m (5 ft 9 in)
- Position: Midfielder

Youth career
- 1991–1993: Kashiwa Reysol

Senior career*
Years	Team	Apps	(Gls)
1994–2001	Kashiwa Reysol	130	(16)
2002–2003	Consadole Sapporo	27	(1)
Total		157	(17)

International career
1996	Japan	1	(0)
Medal record
Kashiwa Reysol
Winner	J.League Cup	1999
- * Club domestic league appearances and goals

Naoki Sakai (酒井 直樹, Sakai Naoki; born August 2, 1975) is a former Japanese football player. He played for Japan national team.

== Club career ==
Sakai was born in Nagareyama on August 2, 1975. He joined his local club Kashiwa Reysol from youth team in 1994. He played as right midfielder. The club won the champions at 1999 J.League Cup. From 2000, his opportunity to play decreased behind Mitsuteru Watanabe. He moved to Consadole Sapporo in 2002. He retired end of 2003 season.

== National team career ==
On October 13, 1996, Sakai debuted for Japan national team against Tunisia.

== Career statistics ==
Appearances and goals by club, season and competition
Club	Season	League			Emperor's Cup		J.League Cup		Total	
Club	Season	Division	Apps	Goals	Apps	Goals	Apps	Goals	Apps	Goals
Kashiwa Reysol	1994	Football League	0	0	0	0	—		0	0
Kashiwa Reysol	1995	J1 League	19	0	0	0	—		19	0
Kashiwa Reysol	1996	J1 League	19	8	1	1	12	3	32	12
Kashiwa Reysol	1997	J1 League	14	0	3	1	6	0	23	1
Kashiwa Reysol	1998	J1 League	27	5	2	3	2	0	31	8
Kashiwa Reysol	1999	J1 League	24	2	4	2	7	0	35	4
Kashiwa Reysol	2000	J1 League	15	0	2	1	0	0	17	1
Kashiwa Reysol	2001	J1 League	12	1	0	0	2	0	14	1
Consadole Sapporo	2002	J1 League	17	1	0	0	3	0	20	1
Consadole Sapporo	2003	J2 League	10	0	0	0	—		10	0
Career total			157	17	12	8	32	3	201	28

== National team statistics ==
Japan national team
Year	Apps	Goals
1996	1	0
Total	1	0
