= Tomonori Hirayama =

Japanese footballer

Tomonori Hirayama 平山 智規
Personal information
- Full name: Tomonori Hirayama
- Date of birth: January 9, 1978 (age 48)
- Place of birth: Hamamatsu, Shizuoka, Japan
- Height: 1.73 m (5 ft 8 in)
- Position: Midfielder

Youth career
- 1993–1995: Shizuoka Kita High School

Senior career*
Years	Team	Apps	(Gls)
1996–2007	Kashiwa Reysol	199	(17)
1998	→ CA Juventus (loan)		
Total		199	(17)
Medal record
Kashiwa Reysol
Winner	J.League Cup	1999
- * Club domestic league appearances and goals

Tomonori Hirayama (平山 智規, Hirayama Tomonori; born January 9, 1978) is a former Japanese football player.

== Playing career ==
Hirayama was born in Hamamatsu on January 9, 1978. After graduating from high school, he joined J1 League club Kashiwa Reysol with teammate Toru Irie in 1996. Although he was left side midfielder, he could hardly play in the match behind Tomohiro Katanosaka until early 1999. In August 1999, he became a regular player and the club won the champions 1999 J.League Cup. The club also won the 3rd place 1999 and 2000 J1 League. From 2004, although his opportunity to play decreased, he played many matches as substitute. However the club results were bad and was relegated to J2 League from 2006. In 2006, he played many matches as starting member and the club was promoted to J1 in a year. However he could hardly play in the match in 2007 and retired end of 2007 season.

== Career statistics ==
Appearances and goals by club, season and competition
Club	Season	League			Emperor's Cup		J.League Cup		Total	
Club	Season	Division	Apps	Goals	Apps	Goals	Apps	Goals	Apps	Goals
Kashiwa Reysol	1996	J1 League	0	0	0	0	2	0	2	0
Kashiwa Reysol	1997	J1 League	0	0	0	0	0	0	0	0
Kashiwa Reysol	1998	J1 League	0	0	0	0	0	0	0	0
Kashiwa Reysol	1999	J1 League	16	2	0	0	9	1	25	2
Kashiwa Reysol	2000	J1 League	27	3	2	0	1	0	30	3
Kashiwa Reysol	2001	J1 League	29	3	0	0	3	0	32	3
Kashiwa Reysol	2002	J1 League	27	2	1	0	6	0	34	2
Kashiwa Reysol	2003	J1 League	27	1	0	0	3	0	30	1
Kashiwa Reysol	2004	J1 League	5	1	1	0	3	0	9	1
Kashiwa Reysol	2005	J1 League	27	2	2	0	5	0	34	2
Kashiwa Reysol	2006	J2 League	33	3	1	0	—		34	3
Kashiwa Reysol	2007	J1 League	8	0	0	0	2	0	10	0
Career total			199	17	7	0	30	3	236	20
