= Motohiro Yoshida =

Japanese footballer

Motohiro Yoshida 吉田 宗弘
Personal information
- Full name: Motohiro Yoshida
- Date of birth: August 25, 1974 (age 52)
- Place of birth: Suita, Osaka, Japan
- Height: 1.85 m (6 ft 1 in)
- Position: Goalkeeper

Youth career
- 1990–1992: Ibaraki High School

College career
Years	Team	Apps	(Gls)
1993–1996	Keio University		

Senior career*
Years	Team	Apps	(Gls)
1997–2002	Kashiwa Reysol	24	(0)
2003–2004	Gamba Osaka	1	(0)
2005–2007	Cerezo Osaka	116	(0)
2008–2009	Avispa Fukuoka	56	(0)
2010–2011	FC Machida Zelvia	48	(0)
Total		245	(0)
Medal record
Kashiwa Reysol
Winner	J.League Cup	1999
- * Club domestic league appearances and goals

Motohiro Yoshida (吉田 宗弘, Yoshida Motohiro; born August 25, 1974) is a former Japanese football player. He is currently a goalkeeper coach of Gamba Osaka.

== Playing career ==
Yoshida was born in Suita on August 25, 1974. After graduating from Keio University, he joined J1 League club Kashiwa Reysol in 1997. However he could not play at all in the match behind Yoichi Doi and Yuta Minami until 1998. From 1999, he battles with Minami for the position and he played many matches in 1999 and 2000. The club also won the champions 1999 J.League Cup and the 3rd place 1999 and 2000 J1 League. However he could hardly play in the match from 2001. In 2003 he moved to his local club Gamba Osaka. However he could hardly play in the match behind Naoki Matsuyo. In 2005, he moved to across town to the Gamba Osaka rivals, Cerezo Osaka. He became a regular goalkeeper and played full time in all matches in 3 seasons. In 2005, the club finished at 5th place and he was also selected Best Eleven. However the club was finished at 17th place in 2006 and was relegated to J2 League from 2007. In 2008, he moved to J2 club Avispa Fukuoka. In 2008, he battles with Ryuichi Kamiyama for the position and played many matches. In 2009, although he became a regular goalkeeper, his lost opportunity to play behind Yuji Rokutan from September. In 2010, he moved to Japan Football League club FC Machida Zelvia. He played many matches in 2 season and the club was promoted to J2 from 2012 season. However he retired end of 2011 season.

== Club statistics ==
Club performance			League		Cup		League Cup		Total	
Season	Club	League	Apps	Goals	Apps	Goals	Apps	Goals	Apps	Goals
Japan			League		Emperor's Cup		J.League Cup		Total	
1997	Kashiwa Reysol	J1 League	0	0	0	0	0	0	0	0
1998	Kashiwa Reysol	J1 League	0	0	0	0	0	0	0	0
1999	Kashiwa Reysol	J1 League	11	0	0	0	7	0	18	0
2000	Kashiwa Reysol	J1 League	10	0	0	0	2	0	12	0
2001	Kashiwa Reysol	J1 League	0	0	0	0	0	0	0	0
2002	Kashiwa Reysol	J1 League	3	0	0	0	0	0	3	0
2003	Gamba Osaka	J1 League	0	0	0	0	2	0	2	0
2004	Gamba Osaka	J1 League	1	0	0	0	0	0	1	0
2005	Cerezo Osaka	J1 League	34	0	3	0	8	0	45	0
2006	Cerezo Osaka	J1 League	34	0	0	0	7	0	41	0
2007	Cerezo Osaka	J2 League	48	0	2	0	-		50	0
2008	Avispa Fukuoka	J2 League	20	0	1	0	-		21	0
2009	Avispa Fukuoka	J2 League	36	0	1	0	-		37	0
2010	Machida Zelvia	JFL	25	0	1	0	-		26	0
2011	Machida Zelvia	JFL	23	0	2	0	-		25	0
Total			245	0	10	0	26	0	281	0
