= Takahiro Shimotaira =

Japanese footballer and manager

Takahiro Shimotaira 下平 隆宏
Personal information
- Date of birth: December 18, 1971 (age 54)
- Place of birth: Gonohe, Aomori, Japan
- Height: 1.75 m (5 ft 9 in)
- Position: Midfielder

Team information
- Current team: Kōchi United SC (manager)

Youth career
- 1997–1999: Gonohe High School

Senior career*
| Years | Team | Apps | (Gls) |
| 1990–2000 | Kashiwa Reysol | 244 | (8) |
| 2001–2002 | FC Tokyo | 39 | (0) |
| 2003–2004 | Kashiwa Reysol | 33 | (0) |
| Total | | 316 | (8) |

Managerial career
- 2016–2018: Kashiwa Reysol
- 2019–2021: Yokohama FC
- 2022–2023: Oita Trinita
- 2024–2025: V-Varen Nagasaki
- 2026–: Kōchi United SC
Medal record
Kashiwa Reysol
| Winner | J.League Cup | 1999 |
- * Club domestic league appearances and goals

Takahiro Shimotaira (下平 隆宏, Shimotaira Takahiro; born December 18, 1971) is a Japanese professional football manager and former player who is the manager of J3 League club Kōchi United SC.

== Playing career ==
Shimotaira was born in Gonohe, Aomori on December 18, 1971. After graduating from high school, he joined Japan Soccer League club Hitachi (later Kashiwa Reysol) in 1990. He became a regular player as defensive midfielder from 1991. In 1992, the Japan Soccer League folded and the club joined the new Japan Football League. In 1995, the club was promoted to J.League Division 1. In 1999, the club won the J.League Cup. In his eleven seasons with the club he played over 250 games and scored eight goals.

In May 2001, Shimotaira transferred to FC Tokyo and by September had been appointed captain of the team.

In 2003, he returned to Kashiwa Reysol. After making 33 league appearances across the 2003 and 2004 seasons, Shimotaira retired at the end of the 2004 season aged 32.

== Coaching career ==
=== Kashiwa Reysol ===
After retirement, Shimotaira started coaching career at Kashiwa Reysol in 2005. He mainly served as scout and manager for youth team until 2015. In 2016, he became a manager for top team under manager Milton Mendes. In March 2016, Mendes was sacked and Shimotaira became a new manager as Mendes successor. Although the club finished in 8th place in 2016, the club finished the 2017 season in 4th place and qualified for the 2018 AFC Champions League. However, the clubs results were bad at the start of the 2018 season and he was dismissed in May when the club were in 14th place of 18 clubs.

=== Yokohama FC ===
In 2019, Shimotaira signed with J2 League club, Yokohama FC and became a head coach under manager Edson Tavares. In May, Tavares was sacked and Shimotaira became the club's new manager. Yokohama were 14th in the league when Shimotaira took over, but he led the team to an eventual 2nd place finish and promotion to the J1 League for the first time in 13 years.

=== Oita Trinita ===
In December 2021 it was agreed that Shimotaira would become manager of newly relegated J2 League club, Oita Trinita for the 2022 season. Oita Trinita finished 5th in his first season at the club, only missing out on promotion after a 2–2 draw with Roasso Kumamoto in the play-offs.

In his second season, Shimotaira was only able to lead Oita to a 9th-placed finish and announced he would stepping down from his role at the end of the 2023 season.

=== V-Varen Nagasaki ===
Shimotaira was announced as V-Varen Nagasaki manager in February 2024, just nine days before the opening game of the season, following contractual issues with outgoing manager Fábio Carille. V-Varen Nagasaki made a strong start to the season and Shimotaira was awarded the J2 League manager of the month award for April after winning all five of their games.

== Club statistics ==
| Club performance | | | League | | Cup | | League Cup | | Total | |
| Season | Club | League | Apps | Goals | Apps | Goals | Apps | Goals | Apps | Goals |
| Japan | | | League | | Emperor's Cup | | J.League Cup | | Total | |
|---|---|---|---|---|---|---|---|---|---|---|
| 1990/91 | Hitachi | JSL Division 2 | 3 | 0 | | | 0 | 0 | 3 | 0 |
| 1991/92 | Hitachi | JSL Division 1 | 21 | 0 | | | 1 | 0 | 22 | 0 |
| 1992 | Hitachi | Football League | 17 | 1 | | | - | | 17 | 1 |
| 1993 | Kashiwa Reysol | Football League | 14 | 2 | 1 | 0 | 6 | 0 | 21 | 2 |
| 1994 | Kashiwa Reysol | Football League | 27 | 2 | 0 | 0 | 1 | 0 | 28 | 2 |
| 1995 | Kashiwa Reysol | J1 League | 35 | 1 | 2 | 0 | - | | 37 | 1 |
| 1996 | Kashiwa Reysol | J1 League | 28 | 0 | 2 | 0 | 14 | 1 | 44 | 1 |
| 1997 | Kashiwa Reysol | J1 League | 24 | 0 | 3 | 0 | 6 | 0 | 33 | 0 |
| 1998 | Kashiwa Reysol | J1 League | 25 | 0 | 1 | 0 | 3 | 0 | 29 | 0 |
| 1999 | Kashiwa Reysol | J1 League | 30 | 2 | 4 | 0 | 6 | 1 | 40 | 3 |
| 2000 | Kashiwa Reysol | J1 League | 20 | 0 | 1 | 0 | 0 | 0 | 21 | 0 |
| 2001 | FC Tokyo | J1 League | 16 | 0 | 0 | 0 | 3 | 0 | 19 | 0 |
| 2002 | FC Tokyo | J1 League | 23 | 0 | 1 | 0 | 6 | 0 | 30 | 0 |
| 2003 | Kashiwa Reysol | J1 League | 20 | 0 | 2 | 0 | 3 | 0 | 25 | 0 |
| 2004 | Kashiwa Reysol | J1 League | 13 | 0 | 1 | 0 | 3 | 0 | 17 | 0 |
| Total | | | 316 | 8 | 18 | 0 | 52 | 2 | 386 | 10 |

== Managerial statistics ==
As of 1 June 2024.

| Team | From | To | Record | | | | |
| Team | From | To | G | W | D | L | Win % |
|---|---|---|---|---|---|---|---|
| Kashiwa Reysol | 2016 | 2018 | 99 | 47 | 22 | 30 | 47.47 |
| Yokohama FC | 2019 | 2021 | 77 | 31 | 15 | 31 | 40.26 |
| Oita Trinita | 2022 | 2023 | 94 | 35 | 30 | 29 | 37.23 |
| V-Varen Nagasaki | 2024 | present | 20 | 13 | 6 | 1 | 65.00 |
| Total | | | 290 | 126 | 73 | 91 | 43.45 |

== Honours ==
=== Player ===
Kashiwa Reysol

- J.League Cup: 1999

=== Manager ===
V-Varen Nagasaki

- J2 League Manager of the Month award: April 2024
