= Takeshi Watanabe (footballer) =

Japanese footballer

Takeshi Watanabe 渡辺 毅
Personal information
- Full name: Takeshi Watanabe
- Date of birth: September 10, 1972 (age 54)
- Place of birth: Fujieda, Shizuoka, Japan
- Height: 1.81 m (5 ft 11 1/2 in)
- Position: Defender

Youth career
- 1988–1990: Fujieda Higashi High School
- 1991–1994: Chuo University

Senior career*
Years	Team	Apps	(Gls)
1995–2004	Kashiwa Reysol	281	(17)
Total		281	(17)

International career
1997	Japan	1	(0)
Medal record
Kashiwa Reysol
Winner	J.League Cup	1999
- * Club domestic league appearances and goals

Takeshi Watanabe (渡辺 毅, Watanabe Takeshi; born September 10, 1972) is a former Japanese football player. He played for Japan national team.

== Club career ==
Watanabe was born in Fujieda on September 10, 1972. After graduating from Chuo University, he joined Kashiwa Reysol in 1995. He played as regular player from first season. The club won the champions at 1999 J.League Cup. At the Final, he scored a tie goal in the 89th minute and he was selected MVP. The club also won the 3rd place in 1999 and 2000 J1 League. He retired at the end of the 2004 season.

== National team career ==
On August 13, 1997, Watanabe debuted for Japan national team against Brazil.

== Club statistics ==
Club performance			League		Cup		League Cup		Total	
Season	Club	League	Apps	Goals	Apps	Goals	Apps	Goals	Apps	Goals
Japan			League		Emperor's Cup		J.League Cup		Total	
1995	Kashiwa Reysol	J1 League	45	1	2	0	-		47	1
1996	Kashiwa Reysol	J1 League	29	3	1	0	14	2	44	5
1997	Kashiwa Reysol	J1 League	30	3	3	0	8	1	41	4
1998	Kashiwa Reysol	J1 League	33	2	2	0	4	0	39	2
1999	Kashiwa Reysol	J1 League	28	0	4	0	9	1	41	1
2000	Kashiwa Reysol	J1 League	30	2	1	0	2	0	33	2
2001	Kashiwa Reysol	J1 League	29	3	1	0	4	1	34	4
2002	Kashiwa Reysol	J1 League	28	1	1	0	7	0	36	1
2003	Kashiwa Reysol	J1 League	14	2	2	0	3	0	19	2
2004	Kashiwa Reysol	J1 League	15	0	1	0	5	0	21	0
Total			281	17	18	0	56	5	355	22

== National team statistics ==
Japan national team
Year	Apps	Goals
1997	1	0
Total	1	0

== Honours ==
Kashiwa Reysol

- J.League Cup: 1999

Individual

- J. League Cup MVP: 1999
