= 2014 Emperor's Cup final =

2014 Emperor's Cup Final
Gamba Osaka	Montedio Yamagata
3	1
- Date: December 13, 2014
- Venue: International Stadium Yokohama, Kanagawa

2014 Emperor's Cup Final was the 94th final of the Emperor's Cup competition. The final was played at International Stadium Yokohama in Kanagawa on December 13, 2014. Gamba Osaka won the championship.

== Match details ==
December 13, 2014

Gamba Osaka	3–1	Montedio Yamagata
Takashi Usami 4', 85'; Patric 22'	Report	Romero Frank 62'

International Stadium Yokohama

Gamba Osaka
GK	1	(Japan) Masaaki Higashiguchi
DF	22	(South Korea) Oh Jae-suk
DF	5	(Japan) Daiki Niwa
DF	8	(Japan) Keisuke Iwashita	(substituted off) 77'
DF	4	(Japan) Hiroki Fujiharu
MF	15	(Japan) Yasuyuki Konno
MF	7	(Japan) Yasuhito Endō
MF	11	(Japan) Shu Kurata
MF	19	(Japan) Kotaro Omori	(substituted off) 87'
FW	39	(Japan) Takashi Usami
FW	29	(Brazil) Patric	(substituted off) 90+3'
Substitutes:
GK	16	(Japan) Kohei Kawata
DF	6	(South Korea) Kim Jung-ya	(substituted on) 77'
DF	14	(Japan) Koki Yonekura
MF	17	(Japan) Tomokazu Myojin	(substituted on) 90+3'
MF	25	(Japan) Kenya Okazaki
FW	9	(Brazil) Lins	(substituted on) 87'
FW	20	(Japan) Akihiro Sato
Manager:
(Japan) Kenta Hasegawa

Montedio Yamagata
GK	31	(Japan) Norihiro Yamagishi
DF	6	(Japan) Takumi Yamada
DF	17	(Japan) Takefumi Toma
DF	3	(Japan) Hidenori Ishii
DF	13	(Japan) Tatsuya Ishikawa
MF	7	(Japan) Ryosuke Matsuoka
MF	15	(Japan) Masaki Miyasaka
MF	10	(Japan) Shun Ito	(substituted off) 46'
FW	30	(Japan) Masato Yamazaki	(substituted off) 60'
FW	11	(Brazil) Diego
FW	24	(Peru) Romero Frank	(substituted off) 80'
Substitutes:
GK	16	(Japan) Akishige Kaneda
DF	2	(Japan) Ryo Kobayashi
DF	4	(Japan) Shogo Nishikawa
DF	5	(Japan) Tetsuya Funatsu	(substituted on) 46'
FW	8	(Japan) Ryohei Hayashi	(substituted on) 60'
FW	9	(Japan) Yuki Nakashima	(substituted on) 80'
FW	18	(Japan) Hiroki Bandai
Manager:
(Japan) Nobuhiro Ishizaki

== See also ==
- 2014 Emperor's Cup
