= 2012 Montedio Yamagata season =

Montedio Yamagata
2012 season
- Manager: Ryosuke Okuno
- J.League Division 2: -
- Emperor's Cup: -
Home colours	Away colours

The 2012 Montedio Yamagata season sees Montedio Yamagata return to J.League Division 2 after being relegated in the 2011 J.League Division 1. This will be their 16th season overall in the second tier. Montedio Yamagata are also competing in the 2012 Emperor's Cup.

== Competitions ==
=== J.League ===
==== League table ====
Pos	Team	Pld	W	D	L	GF	GA	GD	Pts
8	Fagiano Okayama	42	17	14	11	41	34	+7	65
9	Giravanz Kitakyushu	42	19	7	16	53	47	+6	64
10	Montedio Yamagata	42	16	13	13	51	49	+2	61
11	Tochigi SC	42	17	9	16	50	49	+1	60
12	Matsumoto Yamaga	42	15	14	13	46	43	+3	59

Updated to match(es) played on 11 November 2012. Source: J.League Division 2
Rules for classification: 1st points; 2nd goal differential; 3rd goals scored; 4th head-to-head results; 5th disciplinary points; 6th draw. If two clubs are tied for first place, both clubs will be declared champions.

==== Matches ====
4 March 2012 1	JEF United Chiba	2 – 0	Montedio Yamagata	Fukuda Denshi Arena
Sunday 15:34	Fujita 46', 69'	Report		Attendance: 11,479; Referee: Imamura

11 March 2012 2	Matsumoto Yamaga	1 – 2	Montedio Yamagata	Matsumotodaira Park Stadium Alwin
Sunday 13:03	Tsurumaki 37'	Report	28', 72' Akiba	Attendance: 13,098; Referee: Yoshida

17 March 2012 3	Montedio Yamagata	3 – 2	Oita Trinita	NDsoft Stadium Yamagata
Saturday 13:04	Yamazaki 31', 79'; Bandai 75'	Report	89' Murai; 90+1' Mitsuhira	Attendance: 6,315; Referee: Matsuo

20 March 2012 4	Montedio Yamagata	2 – 1	Ventforet Kofu	NDsoft Stadium Yamagata
Tuesday 13:04	Nakashima 59'; Miyasaka 84'	Report	47' Kashiwa	Attendance: 5,736; Referee: Inoue

25 March 2012 5	Fagiano Okayama	2 – 1	Montedio Yamagata	Kanko Stadium
Sunday 13:03	Nakano 36'; Sengoku 61'	Report	64' Nakashima	Attendance: 5,762; Referee: Ogiya

1 April 2012 6	Montedio Yamagata	0 – 0	Mito HollyHock	NDsoft Stadium Yamagata
Sunday 13:04		Report		Attendance: 6,179; Referee: Hayakawa

8 April 2012 7	Yokohama	1 – 2	Montedio Yamagata	Nippatsu Mitsuzawa Stadium
Sunday 16:00	Takeoka 1'	Report	Akiba 43'; Masaki Miyasaka 59'	Attendance: 5,014; Referee: Tomoya Maeda

15 April 2012 8	Montedio Yamagata	1 – 0	Kataller Toyama	ND Soft Stadium Yamagata
Sunday 13:00	Masaki Miyasaka (yellow card) 44'; Nishikawa 45+2'	Report	Ikehata (yellow card) 55'	Attendance: 6,460; Referee: Yosuke Kubota

22 April 2012 9	Giravanz Kitakyushu	0 – 1	Montedio Yamagata	Honjō Athletic Stadium
Sunday 13:00	Miyamoto (yellow card) 15'	Report	Masaki Miyasaka 20'; Bandai (yellow card) 60'; Higa (yellow card) 80'	Attendance: 3,286; Referee: Kenji Ogiya

27 April 2012 10	Montedio Yamagata	2 – 1	Tochigi SC	ND Soft Stadium Yamagata
Friday 13:00	Yamazaki (yellow card) 15'; Akiba 23'; Ota 86'	Report	Kikuoka 50'; Cha Young-Hwan (yellow card) 87'	Attendance: 5,036; Referee: (Japan) Minoru Tojo

30 April 2012 11	Tokyo Verdy	0 – 2	Montedio Yamagata	Ajinomoto Stadium
Monday 18:00	Kajikawa (yellow card) 23'	Report	Miyasaka (yellow card) 18'; Yamazaki (yellow card) 19'; Bandai 41'; Nakashima 69'	Attendance: 6,114; Referee: (Japan) Hiroyoshi Takayama

3 May 2012 12	Montedio Yamagata	2 – 2	Ehime FC	ND Soft Stadium Yamagata
Thursday 18:00	Ishii 36'; Yamazaki 44'; Bandai (yellow card) 45+1'	Report	Uchida (yellow card) 26'; Maeno (yellow card) 38'; Arita 71'; Ishii 80'	Attendance: 7,002; Referee: (Japan) Kazuyoshi Enomoto

6 May 2012 13	Montedio Yamagata	1 – 0	Thespa Kusatsu	ND Soft Stadium Yamagata
Sunday 19:30	Nakashima (yellow card) 28'; Funayama 48'; Bandai (yellow card) 78'	Report		Attendance: 7,102; Referee: (Japan) Hiroyuki Onishi

13 May 2012 14	Avispa Fukuoka	1 – 1	Montedio Yamagata	Level-5 Stadium
Sunday 14:00	Jogo 54'	Report	Akiba 17'	Attendance: 4,040; Referee: (Japan) Masaaki Iemoto

20 May 2012 15	Montedio Yamagata	2 – 1	FC Gifu	ND Soft Stadium Yamagata
Sunday 14:00	Ishii (yellow card) 39'; Bandai (yellow card) 41' (goal) 56'; Yamazaki 66' (pen.)	Report	Koichi Sato 41' (pen.); Nogaito (yellow card) 64'	Attendance: 8,070; Referee: (Japan) Eiji Kawai

27 May 2012 16	Roasso Kumamoto	2 – 1	Montedio Yamagata	Kumamoto Athletics Stadium
Sunday 14:00	Taketomi 13', 45+1'; Iwamaru (yellow card) 23'; Harada (yellow card) 62'	Report	Bandai 12'	Attendance: 3,248; Referee: (Japan) Ryuji Sato

2 June 2012 17	Montedio Yamagata	5 – 1	Gainare Tottori	ND Soft Stadium Yamagata
Saturday 17:00	Ishii 39'; Miyasaka 48', 53'; Nakashima 65' (pen.) 85'; Maeda (yellow card) 90+2'	Report	Yoshino (yellow card) 21'; Sanenobu 56'; Mizumoto (yellow card) 63'; Ozaki (red card) 63'	Attendance: 6,703; Referee: (Japan) Futoshi Nakamura

9 June 2012 18	Kyoto Sanga	2 – 2	Montedio Yamagata	Nishikyogoku Athletic Stadium
Saturday 15:00	Miyayoshi 9', 57'; Kubo (yellow card) 18'	Report	Nakashima 44'; Ishikawa 88'	Attendance: 11,642; Referee: (Japan) Yuki Noda

13 June 2012 19	Montedio Yamagata	1 – 2	Shonan Bellmare	ND Soft Stadium Yamagata
Wednesday 20:00	Bandai (yellow card) 55'; Nishikawa (yellow card) 56'; Miyasaka (yellow card) 58' (goal) 77'; Akiba (yellow card) 60'; Funayama (yellow card) 73'	Report	Nagaki 42'; Kaoru Takayama (yellow card) 66' (goal) 80'; Kobayashi (yellow card) 79'	Attendance: 5,737; Referee: (Japan) Takuto Okabe

17 June 2012 20	Machida Zelvia	0 – 0	Montedio Yamagata	Machida Athletic Stadium
Sunday 19:00	Ota (yellow card) 2'	Report	Akiba (yellow card) 6'; Yamazaki (yellow card) 38'; Ishii (yellow card) 45+1'; Funayama (yellow card) 76'	Attendance: 3,225; Referee: (Japan) Shoichiro Mikami

24 June 2012 21	Montedio Yamagata	1 – 0	Tokushima Vortis	ND Soft Stadium Yamagata
Sunday 20:00	Bandai (yellow card) 44'; Nishikawa (yellow card) 53'; Kobayashi 58'	Report		Attendance: 9,628

1 July 2012 22	Tochigi SC	1 – 0	Montedio Yamagata	Tochigi Green Stadium
Sunday 19:00	Kobayashi 15' (o.g.); Paulinho (yellow card) 53'	Report	Akiba (yellow card) 81'; Hirose (yellow card) 86'	Attendance: 3,770; Referee: (Japan) Koichiro Fukushima

8 July 2012 23	Kataller Toyama	1 – 1	Montedio Yamagata	Toyama Athletic Stadium
Sunday 19:00	Ikehata (yellow card) 79'; Kato 85'; Hiraide (yellow card) 90+3'	Report	Nagata (yellow card) 31'; Ishikawa 45+3'; Nishikawa (yellow card) 90+3'	Attendance: 2,835; Referee: (Japan) Tomoya Maeda

15 July 2012 24	Montedio Yamagata	3 – 1	Avispa Fukuoka	ND Soft Stadium Yamagata
Sunday 20:00	Ishii 39'; Akiba 50'; Funayama 58'	Report	Sakata (yellow card) 38'; Tsutsumi (yellow card) 45+2'; Okada (yellow card) 64'; Kihara 80'	Attendance: 11,275; Referee: (Japan) Futoshi Nakamura

22 July 2012 25	Shonan Bellmare	0 – 0	Montedio Yamagata	Shonan BMW Stadium Hiratsuka
Sunday 19:30	Kikuchi (yellow card) 26'; Kobayashi (yellow card) 62'	Report	Maeda (yellow card) 87'	Attendance: 8,271; Referee: (Japan) Hiroyuki Kimura

29 July 2012 26	Montedio Yamagata	1 – 1	Matsumoto Yamaga	ND Soft Stadium Yamagata
Sunday 20:00	Nakashima 64'; Maeda (yellow card) 75'	Report	Ōhashi (yellow card) 67'; Funayama 75'; Iida (yellow card) 90'	Attendance: 1,132; Referee: (Japan) Hajime Matsuo

5 August 2012 27	Mito HollyHock	-	Montedio Yamagata	K's denki Stadium Mito
Sunday 19:00				Referee: (Japan)

12 August 2012 28	Montedio Yamagata	-	Yokohama	ND Soft Stadium Yamagata
Sunday 20:00				Referee: (Japan)

19 August 2012 29	Ehime FC	-	Montedio Yamagata	Ningineer Stadium
Sunday 20:00				Referee: (Japan)

22 August 2012 30	Ventforet Kofu	-	Montedio Yamagata	Yamanashi Chuo Bank Stadium
Wednesday 20:00				Referee: (Japan)

26 August 2012 31	Montedio Yamagata	-	Machida Zelvia	ND Soft Stadium Yamagata
Sunday 20:00				Referee: (Japan)

2 September 2012 32	Tokushima Vortis	-	Montedio Yamagata	Pocarisweat Stadium
Sunday 19:30				Referee: (Japan)

13 September 2012 33	Gainare Tottori	-	Montedio Yamagata	Tottori Bank Bird Stadium
Thursday				Referee: (Japan)

16 September 2012 34	Montedio Yamagata	-	Kyoto Sanga	ND Soft Stadium Yamagata
Sunday				Referee: (Japan)

22 September 2012 35	Thespa Kusatsu	-	Montedio Yamagata	Shoda Shoyu Stadium Gunma
Saturday				Referee: (Japan)

29 September 2012 36	Montedio Yamagata	-	Tokyo Verdy	ND Soft Stadium Yamagata
Saturday				Referee: (Japan)

6 October 2012 37	Montedio Yamagata	-	Roasso Kumamoto	ND Soft Stadium Yamagata
Saturday				Referee: (Japan)

13 October 2012 38	FC Gifu	-	Montedio Yamagata	Gifu Nagaragawa Stadium
Saturday				Referee: (Japan)

20 October 2012 39	Montedio Yamagata	-	Giravanz Kitakyushu	ND Soft Stadium Yamagata
Saturday				Referee: (Japan)

27 October 2012 40	Montedio Yamagata	-	JEF United Ichihara Chiba	ND Soft Stadium Yamagata
Saturday				Referee: (Japan)

3 November 2012 41	Oita Trinita	-	Montedio Yamagata	Ōita Bank Dome
Saturday				Referee: (Japan)

10 November 2012 42	Montedio Yamagata	-	Fagiano Okayama	ND Soft Stadium Yamagata
Saturday				Referee: (Japan)
