= 2010 Montedio Yamagata season =

Montedio Yamagata
2010 season
- Manager: Shinji Kobayashi
- Stadium: ND Soft Stadium Yamagata
- J. League 1: 13th
- Emperor's Cup: Quarterfinals
- J. League Cup: GL-B 3rd
- Top goalscorer: Yūzō Tashiro (10)

2010 Montedio Yamagata season

== Competitions ==
Competitions	Position
J. League 1	13th / 18 clubs
Emperor's Cup	Quarterfinals
J. League Cup	GL-B 3rd / 7 clubs

=== J. League 1 ===
Pos	Team	Pld	W	D	L	GF	GA	GD	Pts
11	Júbilo Iwata	34	11	11	12	38	49	−11	44
12	Omiya Ardija	34	11	9	14	39	45	−6	42
13	Montedio Yamagata	34	11	9	14	29	42	−13	42
14	Vegalta Sendai	34	10	9	15	40	46	−6	39
15	Vissel Kobe	34	9	11	14	37	45	−8	38

Updated to match(es) played on December 4, 2010. Source: J.League Division 1
Rules for classification: 1) points; 2) goal difference; 3) number of goals scored.

=== Emperor's Cup ===
5 September 2010 1	Montedio Yamagata	3-0	Blaublitz Akita	Tendō
				Stadium: ND Stadium; Attendance: 3,085; Referee: Toshimitsu Yoshida

2	Montedio Yamagata	3–1	Shonan Bellmare	Tendō
	Yu Hasegawa 12'; Tashiro 14'; Miyazaki 57'		Arai 82'	Stadium: ND Stadium; Attendance: 3,249; Referee: Tomohiro Inoue

2	Montedio Yamagata	–	Shonan Bellmare	Tendō
	Yu Hasegawa 12'; Tashiro 14'; Miyazaki 57'		Arai 82'	Stadium: ND Stadium; Attendance: 3,249; Referee: Tomohiro Inoue

Quarter-finals		5–4 (a.e.t.)
	Penalties
	Hyodo (penalty scored); Iwashita (penalty scored); D. Ichikawa (penalty scored); Johnsen (penalty scored); Okazaki (penalty scored)		(penalty scored) Masuda; (penalty missed) Ke. Sato; (penalty scored) R. Kobayashi; (penalty scored) Shimomura; (penalty scored) Tashiro

== Player statistics ==
No.	Pos.	Player	D.o.B. (Age)	Height / Weight	J. League 1		Emperor's Cup		J. League Cup		Total	
No.	Pos.	Player	D.o.B. (Age)	Height / Weight	Apps	Goals	Apps	Goals	Apps	Goals	Apps	Goals
1	GK	Kenta Shimizu	September 18, 1981 (aged 28)	cm / kg	32	0						
2	DF	Ryo Kobayashi	September 12, 1982 (aged 27)	cm / kg	16	0						
3	DF	Hidenori Ishii	September 23, 1985 (aged 24)	cm / kg	28	1						
4	DF	Shogo Nishikawa	July 1, 1983 (aged 26)	cm / kg	18	1						
5	MF	Tomi Shimomura	December 18, 1980 (aged 29)	cm / kg	25	1						
6	MF	Kohei Miyazaki	February 6, 1981 (aged 29)	cm / kg	6	2						
7	MF	Katsuyuki Miyazawa	September 15, 1976 (aged 33)	cm / kg	34	2						
8	MF	Chikashi Masuda	June 19, 1985 (aged 24)	cm / kg	26	1						
9	MF	Tatsuya Furuhashi	November 7, 1980 (aged 29)	cm / kg	22	1						
10	FW	Yūzō Tashiro	July 22, 1982 (aged 27)	cm / kg	29	10						
11	FW	Tomotaka Kitamura	May 27, 1982 (aged 27)	cm / kg	33	5						
13	DF	Tatsuya Ishikawa	December 25, 1979 (aged 30)	cm / kg	33	1						
14	DF	Takuya Miyamoto	July 8, 1983 (aged 26)	cm / kg	26	0						
15	FW	Yu Hasegawa	July 5, 1987 (aged 22)	cm / kg	25	1						
16	MF	Kim Byung-Suk	September 17, 1985 (aged 24)	cm / kg	7	0						
17	MF	Kentaro Sato	August 14, 1984 (aged 25)	cm / kg	33	0						
18	DF	Kim Kun-Hoan	August 12, 1986 (aged 23)	cm / kg	4	0						
19	MF	Masaru Akiba	February 19, 1984 (aged 26)	cm / kg	25	1						
20	GK	Yuki Uekusa	July 2, 1982 (aged 27)	cm / kg	2	0						
21	FW	Han Dong-Won	April 6, 1986 (aged 23)	cm / kg	3	1						
22	DF	Takuya Sonoda	November 23, 1984 (aged 25)	cm / kg	13	0						
23	DF	Kei Nakano	January 21, 1988 (aged 22)	cm / kg	0	0						
24	MF	Shun Ito	October 29, 1987 (aged 22)	cm / kg	3	0						
25	MF	Hisayuki Sato	July 5, 1990 (aged 19)	cm / kg	0	0						
26	MF	Takumi Yamada	November 25, 1989 (aged 20)	cm / kg	3	0						
27	GK	Yuta Suzuki	May 28, 1987 (aged 22)	cm / kg	0	0						
28	MF	Tetsuro Ota	July 2, 1989 (aged 20)	cm / kg	7	0						
29	MF	Tomoyasu Hirose	September 11, 1989 (aged 20)	cm / kg	4	0						
30	GK	Hayato Nakamura	November 18, 1991 (aged 18)	cm / kg	0	0						
31	DF	Yuki Kurihara	May 10, 1990 (aged 19)	cm / kg	0	0						
32	DF	Kazuya Maeda	September 8, 1982 (aged 27)	cm / kg	16	0						

== Other pages ==
- (in Japanese) J. League official site
