= 2009 Montedio Yamagata season =

Montedio Yamagata
2009 season
- Manager: Shinji Kobayashi
- Stadium: ND Soft Stadium Yamagata
- J. League 1: 15th
- Emperor's Cup: 3rd Round
- J. League Cup: GL-B 5th
- Top goalscorer: Yu Hasegawa (10)

2009 Montedio Yamagata season

== Competitions ==
| Competitions | Position |
|---|---|
| J. League 1 | 15th / 18 clubs |
| Emperor's Cup | 3rd Round |
| J. League Cup | GL-B 5th / 7 clubs |

== Player statistics ==
| No. | Pos. | Player | D.o.B. (Age) | Height / Weight | J. League 1 | | Emperor's Cup | | J. League Cup | | Total | |
| No. | Pos. | Player | D.o.B. (Age) | Height / Weight | Apps | Goals | Apps | Goals | Apps | Goals | Apps | Goals |
|---|---|---|---|---|---|---|---|---|---|---|---|---|
| 1 | GK | Kenta Shimizu | September 18, 1981 (aged 27) | cm / kg | 34 | 0 | | | | | | |
| 2 | DF | Makoto Kimura | June 10, 1979 (aged 29) | cm / kg | 2 | 0 | | | | | | |
| 3 | DF | Leonardo | July 22, 1982 (aged 26) | cm / kg | 21 | 1 | | | | | | |
| 4 | DF | Shogo Kobara | November 2, 1982 (aged 26) | cm / kg | 14 | 2 | | | | | | |
| 5 | MF | Takumi Watanabe | March 15, 1982 (aged 26) | cm / kg | 16 | 0 | | | | | | |
| 6 | MF | Kohei Miyazaki | February 6, 1981 (aged 28) | cm / kg | 25 | 1 | | | | | | |
| 7 | MF | Katsuyuki Miyazawa | September 15, 1976 (aged 32) | cm / kg | 31 | 2 | | | | | | |
| 8 | MF | André Silva | April 9, 1980 (aged 28) | cm / kg | 0 | 0 | | | | | | |
| 9 | MF | Tatsuya Furuhashi | November 7, 1980 (aged 28) | cm / kg | 24 | 7 | | | | | | |
| 10 | MF | Nobuyuki Zaizen | October 19, 1976 (aged 32) | cm / kg | 11 | 0 | | | | | | |
| 11 | FW | Tomotaka Kitamura | May 27, 1982 (aged 26) | cm / kg | 29 | 2 | | | | | | |
| 13 | DF | Tatsuya Ishikawa | December 25, 1979 (aged 29) | cm / kg | 31 | 0 | | | | | | |
| 14 | DF | Takuya Miyamoto | July 8, 1983 (aged 25) | cm / kg | 32 | 0 | | | | | | |
| 15 | FW | Yu Hasegawa | July 5, 1987 (aged 21) | cm / kg | 31 | 10 | | | | | | |
| 16 | MF | Kim Byung-Suk | September 17, 1985 (aged 23) | cm / kg | 15 | 2 | | | | | | |
| 17 | MF | Kentaro Sato | August 14, 1984 (aged 24) | cm / kg | 32 | 0 | | | | | | |
| 18 | DF | Kenta Kifuji | October 5, 1981 (aged 27) | cm / kg | 0 | 0 | | | | | | |
| 19 | MF | Masaru Akiba | February 19, 1984 (aged 25) | cm / kg | 31 | 2 | | | | | | |
| 20 | DF | Ryo Kobayashi | September 12, 1982 (aged 26) | cm / kg | 25 | 0 | | | | | | |
| 21 | GK | Taishi Endo | March 31, 1980 (aged 28) | cm / kg | 0 | 0 | | | | | | |
| 22 | DF | Takuya Sonoda | November 23, 1984 (aged 24) | cm / kg | 8 | 0 | | | | | | |
| 23 | DF | Hidenori Ishii | September 23, 1985 (aged 23) | cm / kg | 16 | 0 | | | | | | |
| 24 | FW | Shogo Sakai | January 28, 1988 (aged 21) | cm / kg | 1 | 0 | | | | | | |
| 25 | MF | Hisayuki Sato | July 5, 1990 (aged 18) | cm / kg | 0 | 0 | | | | | | |
| 26 | MF | Takumi Yamada | November 25, 1989 (aged 19) | cm / kg | 2 | 0 | | | | | | |
| 27 | GK | Yuta Suzuki | May 28, 1987 (aged 21) | cm / kg | 0 | 0 | | | | | | |
| 28 | MF | Tetsuro Ota | July 2, 1989 (aged 19) | cm / kg | 3 | 0 | | | | | | |
| 29 | MF | Tomoyasu Hirose | September 11, 1989 (aged 19) | cm / kg | 16 | 1 | | | | | | |
| 30 | GK | Yuki Uekusa | July 2, 1982 (aged 26) | cm / kg | 0 | 0 | | | | | | |
| 31 | DF | Yuki Kurihara | May 10, 1990 (aged 18) | cm / kg | 0 | 0 | | | | | | |
| 32 | FW | Jajá | November 29, 1986 (aged 22) | cm / kg | 2 | 1 | | | | | | |
| 34 | DF | Shogo Nishikawa | July 1, 1983 (aged 25) | cm / kg | 14 | 1 | | | | | | |
| 35 | MF | Takafumi Akahoshi | May 27, 1986 (aged 22) | cm / kg | 8 | 0 | | | | | | |
| 36 | FW | Fagner | August 24, 1990 (aged 18) | cm / kg | 1 | 0 | | | | | | |

== Other pages ==
- (in Japanese) J. League official site
