= J.League historical goals =

List of milestone goals scored in Japan's professional football league history

These are the milestones reached by Japanese football since the creation of J.League.

== J.League (J1) ==
Goal N°	Scorer	Club	Time of Competition	Opponent	Stadium
1	(Netherlands) Henny Meijer	Verdy Kawasaki	JL, MD1 – May 15, 1993	Yokohama F. Marinos	National Olympic Stadium (Tokyo)
500	Takashi Mizunuma	Yokohama F. Marinos	JL, MD34 – December 1, 1993	Nagoya Grampus	Mizuho Rugby Stadium
1000	(Argentina) Ramón Medina Bello	Yokohama F. Marinos	JL, MD25 – August 17, 1994	Kashima Antlers	Nippatsu Mitsuzawa Stadium
2000	(Brazil) Edson	Bellmare Hiratsuka	JL, MD27 – August 12, 1995	Verdy Kawasaki	Kawasaki Todoroki Stadium
3000	Yasutoshi Miura	Verdy Kawasaki	JL, MD16 – August 28, 1996	Cerezo Osaka	Nagai Stadium
4000	Takayuki Yokoyama	Cerezo Osaka	JL, MD23 – August 23, 1997	Gamba Osaka	Osaka Expo '70 Stadium
5000	(Brazil) Basílio	Kashiwa Reysol	JL, MD24 – September 23, 1998	Consadole Sapporo	Sapporo Atsubetsu Park Stadium
6000	Hideto Suzuki	Júbilo Iwata	J1, MD27 – November 7, 1999	Sanfrecce Hiroshima	Yamaha Stadium
7000	Tatsuhiko Kubo	Sanfrecce Hiroshima	J1, MD9 – May 12, 2001	Cerezo Osaka	Coca-Cola West Hiroshima Stadium
8000	(South Korea) Choi Yong-soo	JEF United Chiba	J1, MD18 – September 14, 2002	Nagoya Grampus	Mizuho Athletic Stadium
9000	Daisuke Saito	JEF United Chiba	J1, MD1 – March 13, 2004	Vissel Kobe	Kobe City Misaki Park Stadium
10000	Masafumi Maeda	Gamba Osaka	J1, MD11 – May 8, 2005	Nagoya Grampus	Osaka Expo '70 Stadium
11000	(Brazil) André Pinto	Kyoto Purple Sanga	J1, MD14 – July 23, 2006	Shimizu S-Pulse	Nishikyogoku Athletic Stadium
12000	(Brazil) Ueslei	Sanfrecce Hiroshima	J1, MD17 – June 23, 2007	Vissel Kobe	Kobe City Misaki Park Stadium
13000	Seiichiro Maki	JEF United Chiba	J1, MD24 – September 14, 2008	Tokyo Verdy	Fukuda Denshi Arena
14000	Hiroki Nakayama	Kyoto Sanga	J1, MD33 – November 28, 2009	Urawa Red Diamonds	Nishikyogoku Athletic Stadium
15000	Shinji Tsujio	Shimizu S-Pulse	J1, MD12 – May 22, 2011	Omiya Ardija	NACK5 Stadium Omiya
16000	Naoyuki Fujita	Sagan Tosu	J1, MD11 – May 25, 2012	Gamba Osaka	Osaka Expo '70 Stadium
17000	Daisuke Suzuki	Kashiwa Reysol	J1, MD17 – July 17, 2013	Shimizu S-Pulse	Hitachi Kashiwa Soccer Stadium
18000	Shinzo Koroki	Urawa Red Diamonds	J1, MD25 – September 23, 2014	Albirex Niigata	Denka Big Swan Stadium
19000	Kaoru Takayama	Shonan Bellmare	J1, MD33 – November 7, 2015	Albirex Niigata	Denka Big Swan Stadium
20000	Shota Kaneko	Shimizu S-Pulse	J1, MD8 – April 21, 2017	Kawasaki Frontale	Todoroki Athletics Stadium
21000	Mitsuki Saito	Shonan Bellmare	J1, MD17 – July 22, 2018	Vissel Kobe	Noevir Stadium Kobe
22000	Keita Endo	Yokohama F. Marinos	J1, MD24 – August 24, 2019	Nagoya Grampus	Mizuho Athletic Stadium
23000	(England) Jay Bothroyd	Hokkaido Consadole Sapporo	J1, MD28 – November 21, 2020	Shimizu S-Pulse	Sapporo Dome
24000	(Slovenia) Milan Tučić	Hokkaido Consadole Sapporo	J1, MD37 – November 27, 2021	Kashiwa Reysol	Sapporo Dome
25000	Tsukasa Morishima	Sanfrecce Hiroshima	J1, MD9 – April 22, 2023	FC Tokyo	Hiroshima Big Arch

== J.League 2 (J2) ==
Goal N°	Scorer	Club	Time of Competition	Opponent	Stadium
1	Hayato Okamoto	FC Tokyo	J2, MD1 – March 14, 1999	Sagan Tosu	Nishigaoka Soccer Stadium
500	(Brazil) Jorginho	Omiya Ardija	J2, MD1 – March 12, 2000	Albirex Niigata	NACK5 Stadium Omiya
1000	Naoki Naruo	Albirex Niigata	J2, MD36 – October 1, 2000	Urawa Red Diamonds	Niigata City Athletic Stadium
2000	Tatsuomi Koishi	Sagan Tosu	J2, MD10 – April 20, 2002	Yokohama FC	Mitsuzawa Park Athletics Stadium
3000	Augusto	Kawasaki Frontale	J2, MD30 – August 30, 2003	Montedio Yamagata	Todoroki Athletics Stadium
4000	Shunta Nagai	Mito HollyHock	J2, MD11 – May 7, 2005	Vegalta Sendai	Kasamatsu Stadium
5000	(Brazil) Adiel	Shonan Bellmare	J2, MD31 – July 29, 2006	Consadole Sapporo	Sapporo Atsubetsu Park Stadium
6000	(Brazil) André Pinto	Kyoto Purple Sanga	J2, MD43 – September 29, 2007	Shonan Bellmare	Shonan BMW Stadium Hiratsuka
7000	Kunimitsu Sekiguchi	Vegalta Sendai	J2, MD45 – December 6, 2008	Thespa Kusatsu	Yurtec Stadium Sendai
8000	Yohei Onishi	Ventforet Kofu	J2, MD43 – October 4, 2009	Tokyo Verdy	National Stadium
9000	Keigo Higashi	Oita Trinita	J2, MD38 – December 4, 2010	Yokohama FC	Ōita Bank Dome
10000	Kazuki Hiramoto	Machida Zelvia	J2, MD3 – March 17, 2012	Gainare Tottori	Tottori Bank Bird Stadium
11000	Kaoru Takayama	Shonan Bellmare	J2, MD42 – November 11, 2012	Machida Zelvia	Machida Athletic Stadium
12000	(Brazil) Douglas	Tokushima Vortis	J2, MD35 – September 29, 2013	Gainare Tottori	Pocarisweat Stadium
13000	Hisashi Jogo	Avispa Fukuoka	J2, MD30 – September 6, 2014	Giravanz Kitakyushu	Honjō Athletic Stadium
14000	Hayao Kawabe	Júbilo Iwata	J2, MD27 – August 1, 2015	Fagiano Okayama	City Light Stadium
15000	(North Korea) Jong Tae-se	Shimizu S-Pulse	J2, MD25 – July 25, 2016	JEF United Chiba	Fukuda Denshi Arena
16000	Makito Yoshida	Machida Zelvia	J2, MD25 – June 25, 2017	Tokyo Verdy	Machida Athletic Stadium
17000	(North Korea) An Byong-jun	Roasso Kumamoto	J2, MD13 – May 6, 2018	Ventforet Kofu	Egao Kenko Stadium
18000	(Netherlands) Jordy Buijs	Tokushima Vortis	J2, MD8 – April 7, 2019	Mito HollyHock	K's denki Stadium Mito
19000	Masayuki Yamada	Avispa Fukuoka	J2, MD42 – November 24, 2019	Kagoshima United FC	Level5 Stadium
20000	Masayuki Yamada	Omiya Ardija	J2, MD38 – December 2, 2020	Ehime FC	NACK5 Stadium Omiya

== J3 League (J3) ==
Goal N°	Scorer	Club	Time of Competition	Opponent	Stadium
1	Keisuke Endo	Machida Zelvia	J3, MD1 | March 9, 2014	Blaublitz Akita	Machida Athletic Stadium
1000	Yusuke Hayashi	Grulla Morioka	J3, MD36 | October 31, 2015	Gainare Tottori	South Park Football Stadium
2000	Tomoki Ikemoto	Giravanz Kitakyushu	J3, MD18 | July 22, 2017	FC Tokyo U-23	Ajinomoto Field Nishigaoka
3000	Reo Takeshita	Nagano Parceiro	J3, MD30 | November 4, 2018	Azul Claro Numazu	Ashitaka Park Stadium
