= Han Ho-gang =

Japanese-born South Korean football player (born 1993)

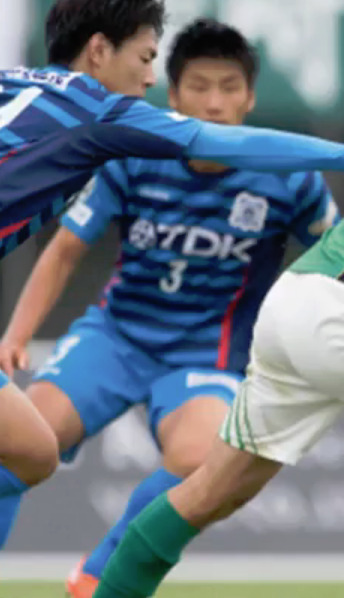
- #3Han with Blaublitz Akita in 2017

Personal information
- Full name: Han Ho-gang
- Date of birth: September 18, 1993 (age 33)
- Place of birth: Kyoto, Japan
- Height: 1.84 m (6 ft 1/2 in)
- Position: Defender

Team information
- Current team: Vegalta Sendai
- Number: 55

Youth career
- –2012: Kyoto Korean Junior High-High School
- 2012–2015: Korea University

Senior career*
Years	Team	Apps	(Gls)
2016–2017	Montedio Yamagata	0	(0)
2016–2017	→ Blaublitz Akita (loan)	29	(0)
2018–2020	Blaublitz Akita	64	(7)
2021–2022	Yokohama FC	24	(0)
2022	Jeonnam Dragons	15	(0)
2023–2026	Suwon Samsung Bluewings	59	(5)
2026–	Vegalta Sendai	2	(0)
- * Club domestic league appearances and goals as of 17 August 2026

- Han Ho-gang
- Hangul: 한호강
- Hanja: 韓浩康
- RR: Han Hogang
- MR: Han Hogang

Han Ho-gang (ハン・ホガン, 한호강, born September 18, 1993) is a Japanese footballer who plays for Vegalta Sendai.

== Career ==
Han was born and raised in City of Kyoto, Japan, educated in the system of Chōsen gakkō, Korean school. After graduating from the Korea University in Tokyo he signed with the J2 club Montedio Yamagata in 2016. In July Han was loaned to J3 team Blaublitz Akita and made his first professional appearance against Fujieda MYFC on Matchweek 19. In his second season he created three assists and won the J3 championship. On 17 November 2019 he scored his first professional headed goal against Gamba Osaka U-23. In his fifth season he bagged six goals and Akita was crowned J3 League champions again. He joined the top tier club Yokohama FC and played 24 games in 2021. In his seventh season he moved to Korean club Jeonnam Dragons. Han signed with K1 team Suwon Samsung Bluewings and hit a goal against Gangwon FC on 13 May 2023.

== Club statistics ==
Updated to 28 November 2022.

Club performance			League		Cup		League Cup		Continental		Total	
Season	Club	League	Apps	Goals	Apps	Goals	Apps	Goals	Apps	Goals	Apps	Goals
Japan			League		Emperor's Cup		League Cup		Asia		Total	
2016	Montedio Yamagata	J2 League	0	0	–		-		-		0	0
2016	Blaublitz Akita	J3 League	1	0	0	0	-		-		1	0
2017	Blaublitz Akita	J3 League	28	0	0	0	-		-		28	0
2018	Blaublitz Akita	J3 League	17	0	0	0	-		-		17	0
2019	Blaublitz Akita	J3 League	18	1	0	0	-		-		18	1
2020	Blaublitz Akita	J3 League	29	6	1	0	-		-		30	6
2021	Yokohama FC	J1 League	24	0	0	0	3	0	-		27	0
2022	Yokohama FC	J2 League	0	0	0	0	-		-		0	0
Korea			League		Domestic Cup		League Cup		Asia		Total	
2022	Jeonnam Dragons	K League 2	15	0	0	0	-		5	0	20	0
Total			132	7	1	0	3	0	5	0	141	7

== Honours ==
Blaublitz Akita

- J3 League (2): 2017, 2020
