= 2017 Blaublitz Akita season =

Blaublitz Akita
2017 season
- Chairman: Kosuke Iwase
- Manager: Koichi Sugiyama
- Stadium: Akigin Stadium; Akita Yabase Athletic Field
- J3 League: Champions
- Emperor's Cup: First round
- Top goalscorer: Tomohiro Tanaka (15)
- Highest home attendance: 3,933
- Lowest home attendance: 1,355
- Average home league attendance: 2,364 (−2.5%)
| Home colours | Away colours |

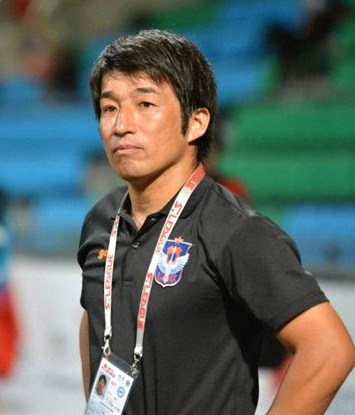
Koichi Sugiyama was manager of Blaublitz Akita during the 2017 season

2017 Blaublitz Akita season. The annual club slogan was "突". The team won the first J3 title on December 3, 2017

== Squad ==
As of 2017.

Note: Flags indicate national team as defined under FIFA eligibility rules; some limited exceptions apply. Players may hold more than one non-FIFA nationality.

| No. | Pos. | Nation | Player |
|---|---|---|---|
| 1 | GK | JPN | Akihito Ozawa |
| 2 | MF | JPN | Tatsuro Inui |
| 3 | DF | KOR | Han Ho-gang |
| 4 | DF | JPN | Shuhei Fukai |
| 5 | DF | JPN | Kaito Chida |
| 6 | DF | JPN | Shingo Arizono |
| 7 | MF | JPN | Kyohei Maeyama |
| 8 | MF | JPN | Tomofumi Fujiyama |
| 9 | MF | JPN | Hiroyuki Furuta |
| 10 | FW | JPN | Keita Hidaka |
| 11 | MF | JPN | Ken Hisatomi |
| 13 | FW | JPN | Ginji Aki |
| 14 | DF | JPN | Itsuki Yamada |
| 15 | MF | JPN | Nao Eguchi |

| No. | Pos. | Nation | Player |
|---|---|---|---|
| 16 | FW | JPN | Masaya Yuma |
| 17 | FW | JPN | Toshiki Sakai |
| 18 | MF | JPN | Keisuke Ono |
| 20 | MF | JPN | Takuma Aoshima |
| 21 | GK | JPN | Takuya Matsumoto |
| 23 | GK | JPN | Fumiya Oishi |
| 24 | DF | JPN | Naoyuki Yamada |
| 25 | MF | JPN | Torai Kamada |
| 29 | FW | JPN | Tomohiro Tanaka |
| 32 | DF | JPN | Takahiro Urashima |
| 36 | MF | JPN | Ryoto Higa |
| 43 | DF | JPN | Kohei Shimoda |

== J3 League ==
| Match | Date | Team | Score | Team | Venue | Attendance |
| 1 | 2017.03.12 | Giravanz Kitakyushu | 1-1 | Blaublitz Akita | Mikuni World Stadium Kitakyushu | 14,935 |
| 2 | 2017.03.19 | Cerezo Osaka U-23 | 1-3 | Blaublitz Akita | Kincho Stadium | 1,083 |
| 4 | 2017.04.02 | Blaublitz Akita | 1-0 | Grulla Morioka | Akigin Stadium | 2,416 |
| 5 | 2017.04.16 | Blaublitz Akita | 3-1 | Gainare Tottori | Akigin Stadium | 1,518 |
| 6 | 2017.04.30 | FC Ryukyu | 1-6 | Blaublitz Akita | Okinawa Athletic Park Stadium | 3,789 |
| 7 | 2017.05.07 | Blaublitz Akita | 3-0 | Fujieda MYFC | Akita Yabase Athletic Field | 2,118 |
| 8 | 2017.05.14 | Fukushima United FC | 0-2 | Blaublitz Akita | Toho Stadium | 1,494 |
| 9 | 2017.05.21 | Blaublitz Akita | 0-0 | AC Nagano Parceiro | Akigin Stadium | 2,379 |
| 10 | 2017.05.28 | Blaublitz Akita | 1-0 | Kagoshima United FC | Akita Yabase Athletic Field | 3,491 |
| 11 | 2017.06.04 | Tochigi SC | 0-1 | Blaublitz Akita | Tochigi Green Stadium | 3,632 |
| 12 | 2017.06.11 | Blaublitz Akita | 1-1 | Kataller Toyama | Akigin Stadium | 2,488 |
| 13 | 2017.06.18 | Azul Claro Numazu | 0-1 | Blaublitz Akita | Ashitaka Park Stadium | 2,491 |
| 14 | 2017.06.25 | Blaublitz Akita | 1-0 | SC Sagamihara | Akigin Stadium | 2,301 |
| 15 | 2017.07.01 | FC Tokyo U-23 | 1-1 | Blaublitz Akita | Ajinomoto Field Nishigaoka | 1,411 |
| 16 | 2017.07.09 | Blaublitz Akita | 4-3 | YSCC Yokohama | Akigin Stadium | 2,019 |
| 17 | 2017.07.15 | Gamba Osaka U-23 | 2-1 | Blaublitz Akita | Expo '70 Commemorative Stadium | 902 |
| 18 | 2017.07.23 | Blaublitz Akita | 0-2 | Azul Claro Numazu | Akigin Stadium | 1,355 |
| 20 | 2017.08.27 | Blaublitz Akita | 2-0 | Gamba Osaka U-23 | Akigin Stadium | 2,288 |
| 21 | 2017.09.03 | Blaublitz Akita | 1-1 | Tochigi SC | Akigin Stadium | 2,461 |
| 22 | 2017.09.10 | Grulla Morioka | 1-3 | Blaublitz Akita | Iwagin Stadium | 1,217 |
| 23 | 2017.09.17 | YSCC Yokohama | 2-1 | Blaublitz Akita | NHK Spring Mitsuzawa Football Stadium | 612 |
| 24 | 2017.09.24 | Blaublitz Akita | 1-2 | FC Ryukyu | Akigin Stadium | 3,933 |
| 25 | 2017.09.30 | Kagoshima United FC | 1-1 | Blaublitz Akita | Kagoshima Kamoike Stadium | 4,419 |
| 26 | 2017.10.07 | Blaublitz Akita | 1-2 | FC Tokyo U-23 | Akigin Stadium | 1,691 |
| 27 | 2017.10.14 | SC Sagamihara | 1-1 | Blaublitz Akita | Sagamihara Gion Stadium | 1,673 |
| 28 | 2017.10.22 | Blaublitz Akita | 1-0 | Giravanz Kitakyushu | Akigin Stadium | 1,871 |
| 29 | 2017.10.29 | AC Nagano Parceiro | 1-2 | Blaublitz Akita | Minami Nagano Sports Park Stadium | 2,986 |
| 30 | 2017.11.05 | Kataller Toyama | 0-4 | Blaublitz Akita | Toyama Stadium | 3,053 |
| 31 | 2017.11.12 | Blaublitz Akita | 0-3 | Cerezo Osaka U-23 | Akigin Stadium | 3,109 |
| 32 | 2017.11.19 | Blaublitz Akita | 2-1 | Fukushima United FC | Akigin Stadium | 2,381 |
| 33 | 2017.11.26 | Fujieda MYFC | 3-0 | Blaublitz Akita | Fujieda Soccer Stadium | 1,467 |
| 34 | 2017.12.03 | Gainare Tottori | 0-3 | Blaublitz Akita | Tottori Bank Bird Stadium | 1,746 |

=== Standings ===
| Pos | Team | Pld | W | D | L | GF | GA | GD | Pts | Promotion |
|---|---|---|---|---|---|---|---|---|---|---|
| 1 | Blaublitz Akita (C) | 32 | 18 | 7 | 7 | 53 | 31 | +22 | 61 | |
| 2 | Tochigi SC (P) | 32 | 16 | 12 | 4 | 44 | 24 | +20 | 60 | Promotion to 2018 J2 League |
| 3 | Azul Claro Numazu | 32 | 16 | 11 | 5 | 60 | 27 | +33 | 59 | |
| 4 | Kagoshima United | 32 | 17 | 4 | 11 | 49 | 37 | +12 | 55 | |
| 5 | Nagano Parceiro | 32 | 13 | 11 | 8 | 34 | 25 | +9 | 50 | |
| 6 | FC Ryukyu | 32 | 13 | 11 | 8 | 44 | 36 | +8 | 50 | |
| 7 | Fujieda MYFC | 32 | 12 | 11 | 9 | 50 | 43 | +7 | 47 | |
| 8 | Kataller Toyama | 32 | 13 | 8 | 11 | 37 | 33 | +4 | 47 | |
| 9 | Giravanz Kitakyushu | 32 | 13 | 7 | 12 | 44 | 37 | +7 | 46 | |
| 10 | Fukushima United | 32 | 13 | 4 | 15 | 39 | 43 | −4 | 43 | |
| 11 | FC Tokyo U-23 | 32 | 12 | 7 | 13 | 36 | 47 | −11 | 43 | |
| 12 | SC Sagamihara | 32 | 9 | 12 | 11 | 34 | 41 | −7 | 39 | |
| 13 | Cerezo Osaka U-23 | 32 | 8 | 11 | 13 | 39 | 43 | −4 | 35 | |
| 14 | YSCC Yokohama | 32 | 8 | 8 | 16 | 41 | 54 | −13 | 32 | |
| 15 | Grulla Morioka | 32 | 7 | 8 | 17 | 32 | 49 | −17 | 29 | |
| 16 | Gamba Osaka U-23 | 32 | 7 | 5 | 20 | 31 | 65 | −34 | 26 | |
| 17 | Gainare Tottori | 32 | 4 | 9 | 19 | 31 | 63 | −32 | 21 | |

Source: 2017 MEIJI YASUDA J3 LEAGUE League table
Rules for classification: 1) Points; 2) Goal difference; 3) Goals scored; 4th) head-to-head results; 5th) disciplinary points; 6th) draw
(C) Champions; (P) Promoted

== Emperor's Cup ==
| 9 April 2017 Akita Prefecture Qualifying Final | Blaublitz Akita | 9–0 | North Asia University | Akigin Stadium |
| 13:00 | Maeyama 9', 61'; Furuta 17'; Yamada 64', 83'; Fukai 70'; Sakai 73'; Aki 81', 92' | Report | | Attendance: 602 |

| 22 April 2017 | Blaublitz Akita | 1–2 | Kokushikan University | Akita |
| 13:00 | Tanaka 84' | Report | Takahashi 12'; Araki 32' | Stadium: Akigin Stadium; Attendance: 587; Referee: Naoto Uehara |

== Other games ==
| 8 February 2017 | Blaublitz Akita | 5–0 | Fuji University | Akita Sky Dome |
| 15:00 | | Report |

| 11 February 2017 | Sendai University | 1–3 | Blaublitz Akita | Sendai University |
| 13:00 | | Report |

| 18 February 2017 | Kochi United SC | 1–4 | Blaublitz Akita | Haruno Ball Game Ground |
| 11:00 | | Report |

| 23 February 2017 | Aoyama Gakuin University | 0–3 | Blaublitz Akita | Tokinosumika Sports Center Usagijima #2 Ground |
| 11:00 | | Report |

| 26 February 2017 | Kashiwa Reysol | 1–0 | Blaublitz Akita | Sankyo Frontier Kashiwa Stadium |
| 14:30 | | Report |

| 5 March 2017 | Blaublitz Akita | 1–1 | Iwaki FC | Nikaho Green Field |
| 14:00 | | Report |

| 15 March 2017 | Blaublitz Akita | 7–0 | North Asia University | TDK Akita General Sports Center |
| 13:00 | | Report |

| 25 March 2017 | Albirex Niigata | 6–0 | Blaublitz Akita | Niigata Seiro Sports Center |
| 13:00 | | Report |

| 3 May 2017 | Blaublitz Akita | 1–0 | Hachinohe Gakuin University | Mizubayashi Athletic Field |
| 15:00 | | Report |

| 2 July 2017 | Omiya Ardija | 4–0 | Blaublitz Akita | Ardija Field |
| 11:00 | | Report |

| 5 August 2017 | Blaublitz Akita | 2–1 | ReinMeer Aomori | TDK Akita General Sports Center |
| 13:00 | | Report |

| 20 September 2017 | Blaublitz Akita | 1–0 | Yamagata University | Space Project Dream Field |
| 11:00 | | Report |

| 3 October 2017 | Blaublitz Akita | 0–0 | Japan Soccer College | Space Project Dream Field |
| 13:00 | | Report |

| 15 October 2017 | Sendai University | 4–0 | Blaublitz Akita | Sendai University |
| 13:00 | | Report |

| 15 November 2017 | Blaublitz Akita | 1–0 | Aomori Yamada High | Space Project Dream Field |
| 11:00 | | Report |

== Gallery ==
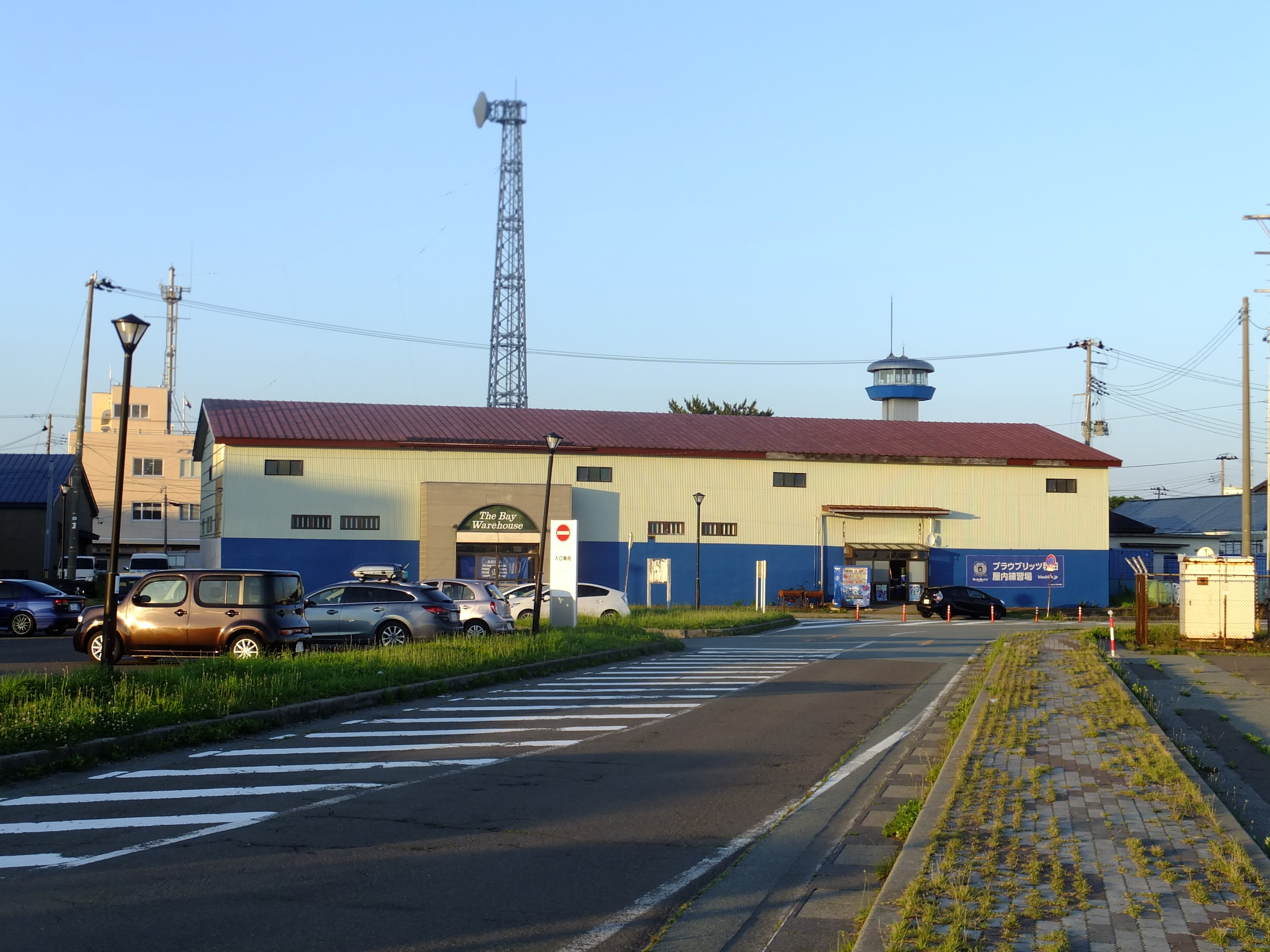
Tsuchizaki Practice Facility in 2017

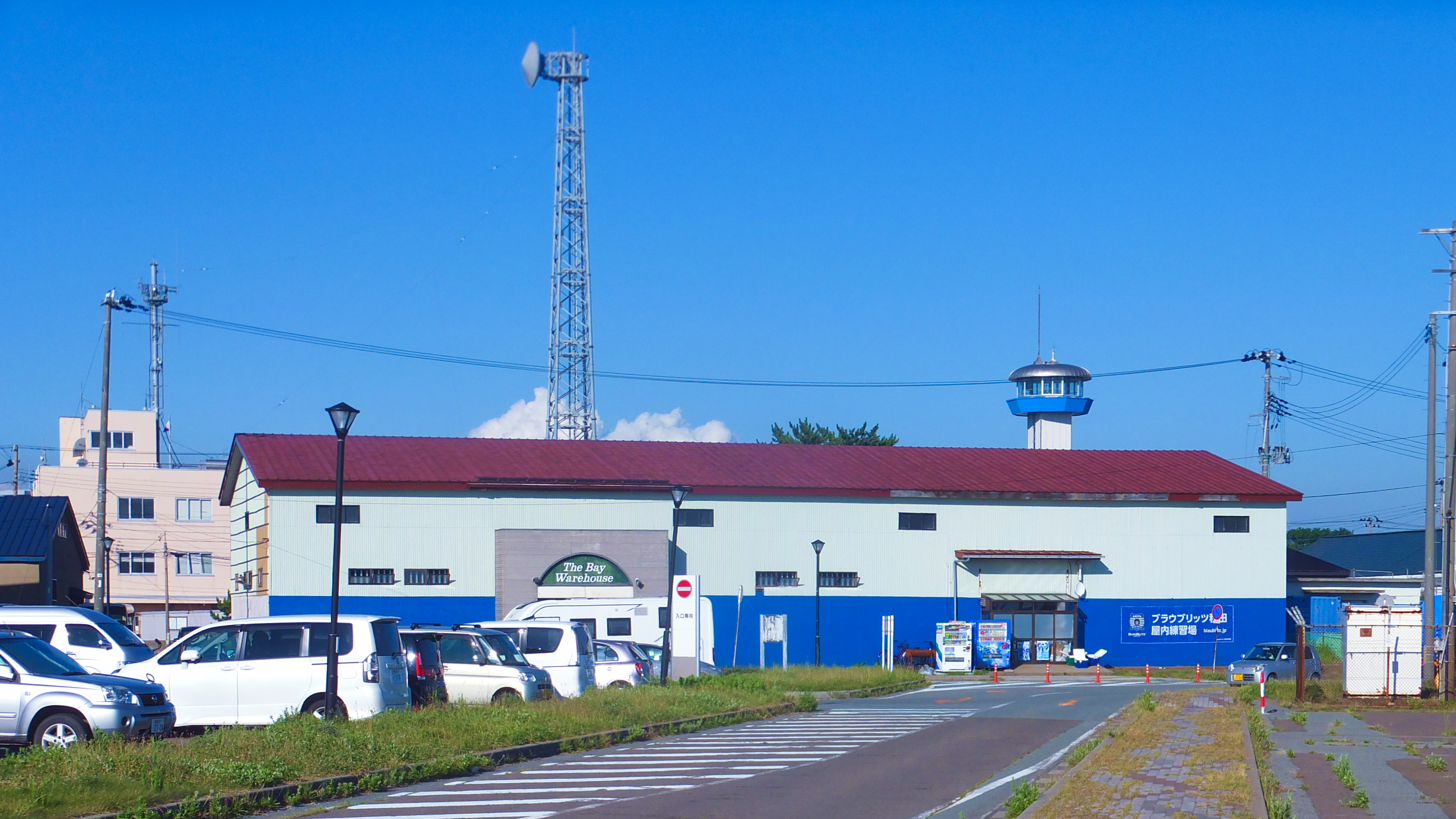
Tsuchizaki Practice Facility in 2017

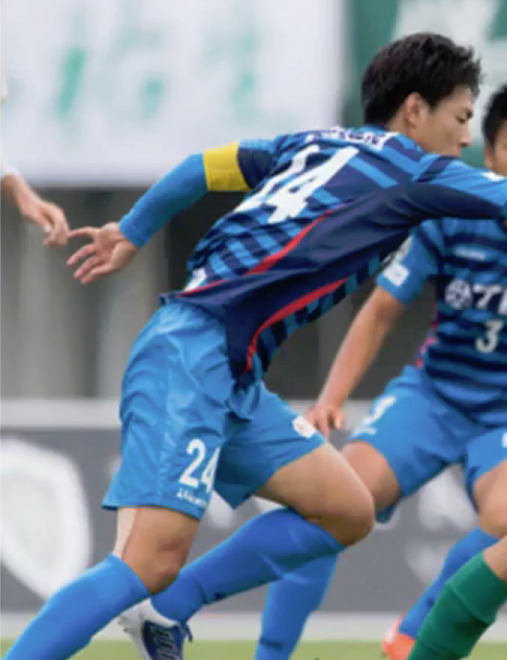
Naoyuki Yamada

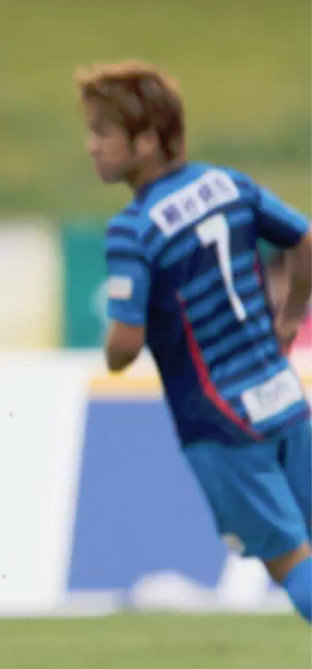
Maeyama

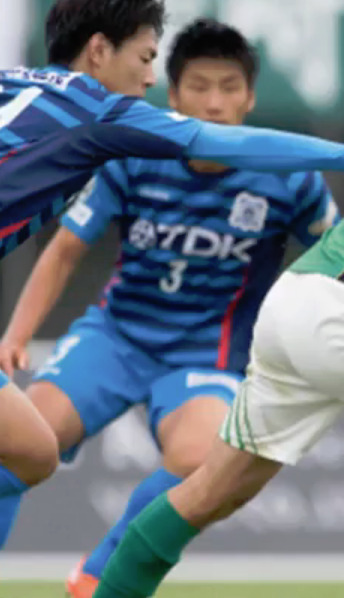
Han

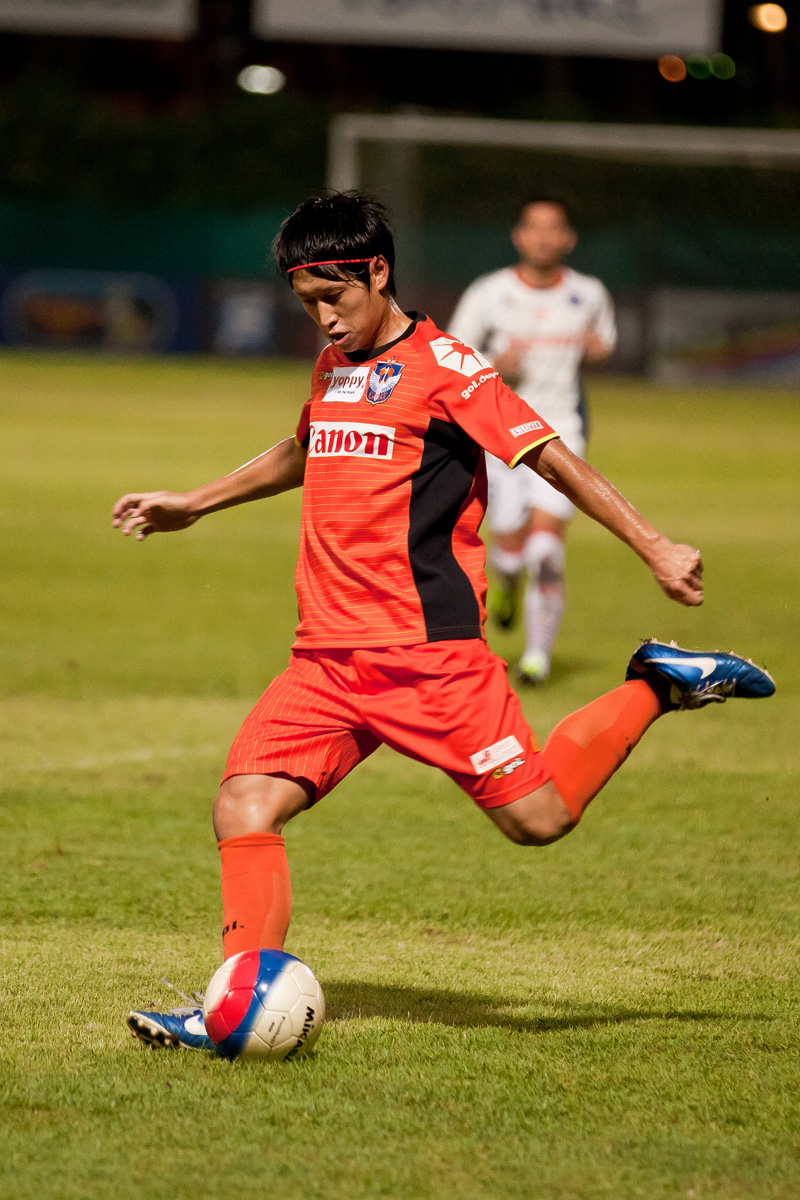
Itsuki Yamada

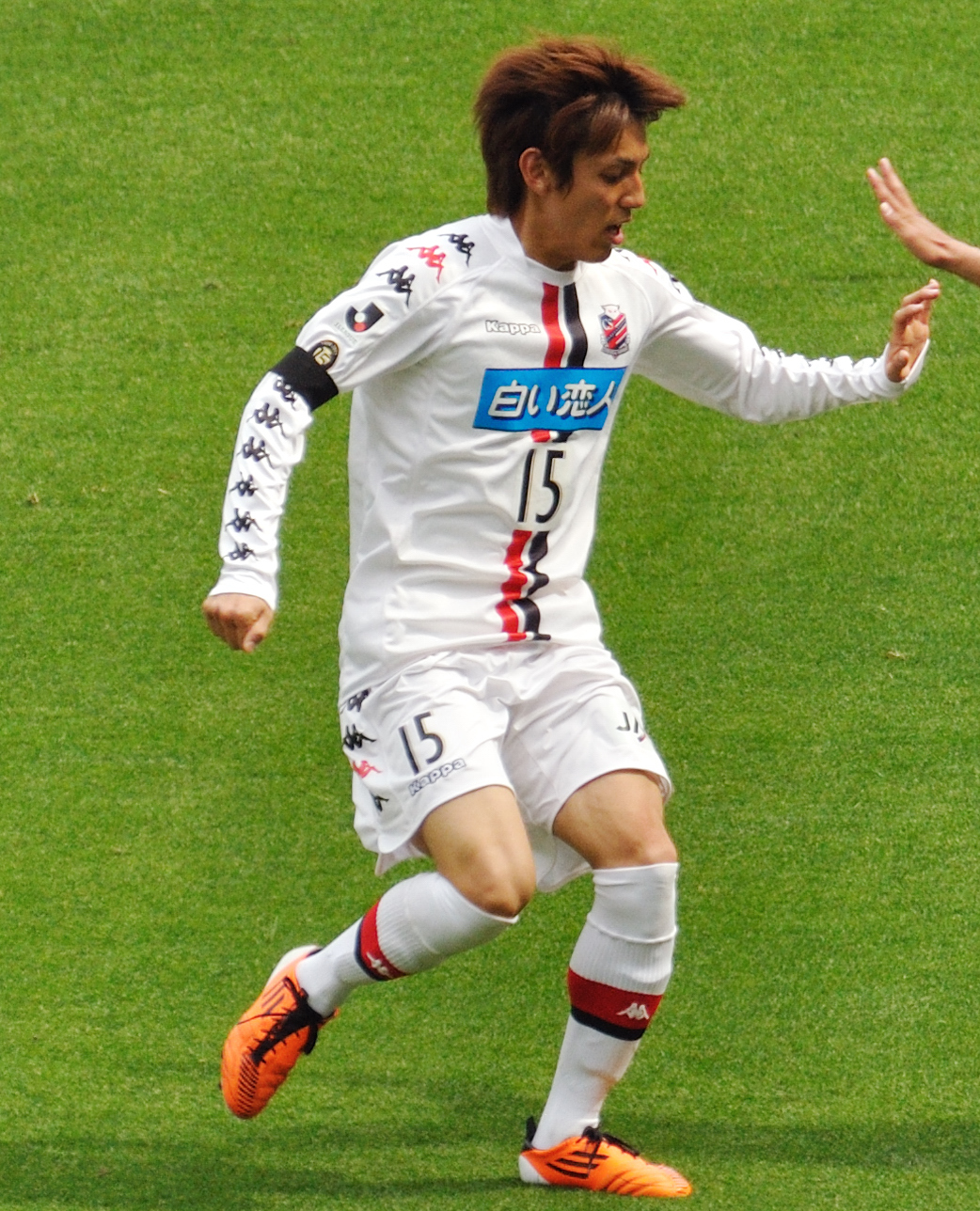
Furuta

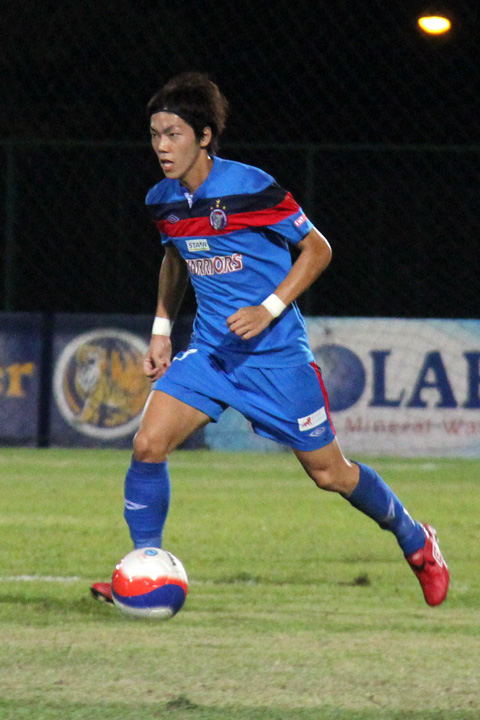
Inui
