= Ginji =

- Gender: Male

Origin
- Origin: Japanese
- Meaning: Different meanings depending on the kanji used

Ginji (written: 銀次, 銀治 or 吟二) is a masculine Japanese given name. Notable people with the name include:

- Ginji Akaminai (赤見内 銀次; born 1988), Japanese baseball player
- Ginji Aki (安芸 銀治; born 1994), Japanese footballer
- Takabayashi Ginji (高林 吟二; 1902–1972), Japanese Noh actor

== Fictional characters ==
- Ginji Amano (天野 銀次), a character in the manga series GetBackers
- Ginji Matsuzaki (松崎 銀次), a character in the manga series Black Lagoon
- Ginji Kyuma - a character in Alice in Borderland
- Ginji Shikano, a character in the anime and game series Little Battlers Experience
