= Tatsuya Ishikawa =

Japanese footballer (born 1979)

Tatsuya Ishikawa 石川 竜也
Personal information
- Full name: Tatsuya Ishikawa
- Date of birth: December 25, 1979 (age 46)
- Place of birth: Fujieda, Shizuoka, Japan
- Height: 1.79 m (5 ft 10 1/2 in)
- Position: Defender

Youth career
- 1995–1997: Fujieda Higashi High School

College career
Years	Team	Apps	(Gls)
1998–2001	University of Tsukuba		

Senior career*
Years	Team	Apps	(Gls)
2002–2006	Kashima Antlers	45	(3)
2006	Tokyo Verdy	21	(1)
2007–2017	Montedio Yamagata	318	(10)
Total		384	(14)

International career
1999	Japan U-20	5	(1)
Medal record
Kashima Antlers
Winner	J.League Cup	2002
Runner-up	J.League Cup	2003
Runner-up	J.League Cup	2006
Runner-up	Emperor's Cup	2002
Montedio Yamagata
Runner-up	Emperor's Cup	2014
Representing Japan
FIFA U-20 World Cup
Silver medal – second place	1999 Nigeria
AFC U-19 Championship
Silver medal – second place	1998 Thailand
- * Club domestic league appearances and goals

Tatsuya Ishikawa (石川 竜也, Ishikawa Tatsuya; born December 25, 1979) is a Japanese former football player.

== Club career ==
Ishikawa was born in Fujieda on December 25, 1979. After graduating from the University of Tsukuba, he joined the Kashima Antlers in 2002. He gradually played more often as left side back during the first season and the Antlers won the championship in the 2002 J.League Cup and second place in the 2002 Emperor's Cup and 2003 J.League Cup. However he did not play as often after Toru Araiba came to the Antlers in 2004. In May 2006, he moved to Tokyo Verdy and played more often. He moved to Montedio Yamagata in 2007. He became a regular player as a left side back for a long time. In 2014, he played as left stopper of a three-back defense. He retired at the end of the 2017 season.

== National team career ==
In April 1999, when Ishikawa was a University of Tsukuba student, he was selected by the Japan U-20 national team for the 1999 World Youth Championship. At this tournament, he played five matches and Japan won second place.

== Club statistics ==
Club performance			League		Cup		League Cup		Continental		Other		Total	
Season	Club	League	Apps	Goals	Apps	Goals	Apps	Goals	Apps	Goals	Apps	Goals	Apps	Goals
Japan			League		Emperor's Cup		J.League Cup		Asia		Other^{1}		Total	
2002	Kashima Antlers	J1 League	6	1	2	0	4	0	-		-		12	1
2003	Kashima Antlers	J1 League	14	0	4	0	2	0	2	0	3	0	25	0
2004	Kashima Antlers	J1 League	12	2	1	0	5	0	-		-		18	2
2005	Kashima Antlers	J1 League	10	0	1	1	4	0	-		-		15	1
2006	Kashima Antlers	J1 League	3	0	0	0	1	0	-		-		4	0
Total			45	3	8	1	16	0	2	0	3	0	74	4
2006	Tokyo Verdy	J2 League	21	1	1	0	-		-		-		22	1
Total			21	1	1	0	-		-		-		22	1
2007	Montedio Yamagata	J2 League	46	2	2	1	-		-		-		48	3
2008	Montedio Yamagata	J2 League	41	2	1	0	-		-		-		42	2
2009	Montedio Yamagata	J1 League	31	0	1	0	4	0	-		-		36	0
2010	Montedio Yamagata	J1 League	33	1	2	0	4	0	-		-		39	1
2011	Montedio Yamagata	J1 League	18	0	0	0	0	0	-		-		18	0
2012	Montedio Yamagata	J2 League	41	3	0	0	-		-		-		41	3
2013	Montedio Yamagata	J2 League	18	0	1	0	-		-		-		19	0
2014	Montedio Yamagata	J2 League	35	2	2	0	-		-		2	0	41	2
2015	Montedio Yamagata	J1 League	34	0	3	0	3	0	-		-		40	0
2016	Montedio Yamagata	J2 League	14	0	1	0	–		–		–		15	0
2017	Montedio Yamagata	J2 League	7	0	2	0	–		–		–		9	0
Total			318	10	15	1	11	0	–		2	0	346	11
Career total			384	14	24	2	27	0	2	0	5	0	442	16

^{1}Includes A3 Champions Cup and Promotion Playoffs to J1.

== Honors and awards ==
- FIFA World Youth Championship runner-up: 1999
