= Katsuyuki Miyazawa =

Japanese footballer

Katsuyuki Miyazawa 宮沢 克行
Personal information
- Date of birth: September 15, 1976 (age 50)
- Place of birth: Narashino, Japan
- Height: 1.74 m (5 ft 8 1/2 in)
- Position: Midfielder

Youth career
- 1992–1994: Bunan High School
- 1995–1998: Meiji University

Senior career*
Years	Team	Apps	(Gls)
1999–2001	Urawa Reds	8	(2)
2002–2006	Albirex Niigata	75	(11)
2004	→ Montedio Yamagata (loan)	22	(2)
2006–2012	Montedio Yamagata	205	(13)
Total		310	(28)
- * Club domestic league appearances and goals

Katsuyuki Miyazawa (宮沢 克行, Miyazawa Katsuyuki; born September 15, 1976) is a former Japanese football player.

== Playing career ==
Miyazawa was born in Narashino on September 15, 1976. After graduating from Meiji University, he joined J1 League club Urawa Reds in 1999. Although he played several matches as forward and offensive midfielder, he could not play many matches. In 2002, he moved to J2 League club Albirex Niigata. He became a regular player as defensive midfielder and offensive midfielder. The club won the champions in 2003 and was promoted to J1 from 2004. However his opportunity to play decreased. In July 2004, he moved to J2 club Montedio Yamagata on loan. He became a regular player as left midfielder. In 2005, he returned to Albirex Niigata. However he could hardly play in the match. In September 2006, he moved to Montedio Yamagata again. He became a regular player as left midfielder again and played many matches for a long time. The club was also promoted to J1 from 2009. In 2011, the club finished at the bottom place and was relegated J2 from 2012. His opportunity to play also decreased in 2012 and he retired end of 2012 season.

== Career statistics ==
Appearances and goals by club, season and competition
Club	Season	League			Emperor's Cup		J.League Cup		Total	
Club	Season	Division	Apps	Goals	Apps	Goals	Apps	Goals	Apps	Goals
Urawa Reds	1999	J1 League	3	1	2	0	0	0	5	1
Urawa Reds	2000	J2 League	5	1	0	0	1	0	6	1
Urawa Reds	2001	J1 League	0	0	0	0	0	0	0	0
Albirex Niigata	2002	J2 League	31	6	2	2	—		33	8
Albirex Niigata	2003	J2 League	31	5	0	0	—		31	5
Albirex Niigata	2004	J1 League	7	0	0	0	1	0	8	0
Montedio Yamagata	2004	J2 League	22	2	2	2	—		24	4
Albirex Niigata	2005	J1 League	2	0	2	0	1	0	5	0
Albirex Niigata	2006	J1 League	4	0	0	0	5	0	9	0
Montedio Yamagata	2006	J2 League	12	2	2	1	—		14	3
Montedio Yamagata	2007	J2 League	44	4	1	0	—		45	4
Montedio Yamagata	2008	J2 League	40	3	1	0	—		41	3
Montedio Yamagata	2009	J1 League	31	2	1	0	5	1	37	3
Montedio Yamagata	2010	J1 League	34	2	1	0	5	0	40	2
Montedio Yamagata	2011	J1 League	25	0	1	0	1	0	27	0
Montedio Yamagata	2012	J2 League	19	0	1	0	—		20	0
Career total			310	28	16	5	19	1	345	34
