= Takabayashi =

Takabayashi (written: 高林 lit. "high forest") is a Japanese surname. Notable people with the surname include:

- Ginji Takabayashi (高林 銀次; died 1972), Japanese Noh actor
- Kiyotaka Takabayashi (高林 清高; born 1928), Japanese speed skater
- Takashi Takabayashi (高林 隆; 1931–2009), Japanese footballer
- Takayuki Takabayashi (高林 孝行; born 1967), Japanese baseball player
- Toshio Takabayashi (高林 敏夫; born 1953), Japanese footballer
- Yoichi Takabayashi (高林 陽一; 1931–2012), Japanese film director
