= Akihito Ozawa =

Japanese footballer

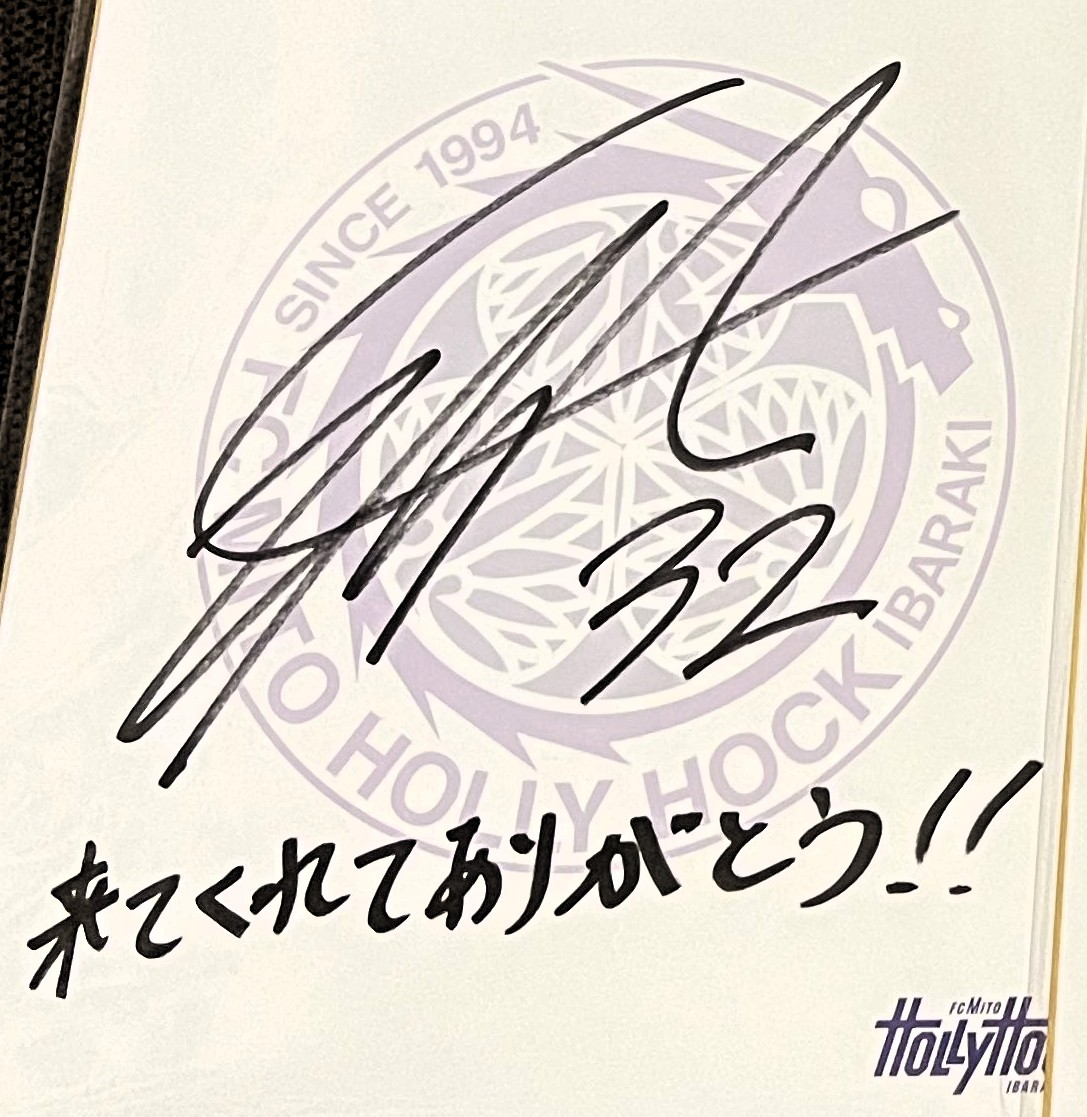

Personal information
- Date of birth: August 10, 1992 (age 34)
- Place of birth: Chichibu, Saitama, Japan
- Height: 1.84 m (6 ft 1/2 in)
- Position: Goalkeeper

Team information
- Current team: FC Ryukyu
- Number: 33

Youth career
- Chichibu JFC
- FC Coruja
- Maebashi Ikuei High School
- –2010: Seibudai High School

College career
Years	Team	Apps	(Gls)
2011–2014	Kokushikan University		

Senior career*
Years	Team	Apps	(Gls)
2015	SP Kyoto FC	5	(0)
2016	Albirex Niigata	0	(0)
2017	Blaublitz Akita	17	(0)
2018–2020	AC Nagano Parceiro	53	(0)
2021-2022	Mito HollyHock	1	(0)
2023–2024	Blaublitz Akita	0	(0)
2024	→ FC Imabari (loan)	2	(0)
2025–	FC Ryukyu	0	(0)
- * Club domestic league appearances and goals as of 20 March 2025

Akihito Ozawa (小澤 章人, Ozawa Akihito; born August 10, 1992) is a Japanese football player who plays for J3 League club FC Ryukyu.

== Career ==
Akihito Ozawa joined Japan Football League club SP Kyoto FC in 2015. He moved to the J1 League club Albirex Niigata in 2016, and then to J3 League club Blaublitz Akita during the 2017.

== Club statistics ==
Updated to 13 December 2022.

Club performance			League		Cup		Total	
Season	Club	League	Apps	Goals	Apps	Goals	Apps	Goals
Japan			League		Emperor's Cup		Total	
2015	SP Kyoto FC	JFL	5	0	0	0	5	0
2016	Albirex Niigata	J1 League	0	0	0	0	0	0
2017	Blaublitz Akita	J3 League	17	0	0	0	17	0
2018	Nagano Parceiro	J3 League	12	0	2	0	14	0
2019	Nagano Parceiro	J3 League	20	0	0	0	20	0
2020	Nagano Parceiro	J3 League	21	0	-		21	0
2021	Mito HollyHock	J2 League	1	0	0	0	1	0
2022	Mito HollyHock	J2 League	0	0	0	0	0	0
2023	Blaublitz Akita	J2 League	0	0	0	0	0	0
Total			76	0	2	0	78	0

== Honours ==
Blaublitz Akita

- J3 League (1): 2017
