= Kyoto Korean Junior High-High School =

North Korea-affiliated school in Japan

- 京都朝鮮中高級学校 교또조선중고급학교

Location
- 1 Kitashirakawa Sotoyamachō, Sakyō-ku; Kyoto, Kyoto Prefecture, 606-8282; Japan; 35°01′43″N 135°47′57″E

Information
- Type: Private Korean international school
- Established: 1953; 73 years ago
- School board: Kyoto Korean Educational Foundation
- Principal: 文峯秀
- Grades: Junior and senior high school
- Enrollment: 106 (2026)
- Website: www.korea.ed.jp

Kyoto Korean Junior High-High School (京都朝鮮中高級学校, Kyōto Chōsen Chūkōkyūgakkō; Korean: 교또조선중고급학교) is a North Korean international school in Sakyō-ku, Kyoto, Japan, serving junior and senior high school levels.

== Notable alumni ==
- Han Ho-gang - a professional footballer
- Son Min-chol - a professional footballer
