= Makoto Kimura =

Japanese footballer

Makoto Kimura 木村 誠
Personal information
- Full name: Makoto Kimura
- Date of birth: June 10, 1979 (age 47)
- Place of birth: Fukui, Japan
- Height: 1.72 m (5 ft 7 1/2 in)
- Position: Defender

Youth career
- 1995–1997: Maruoka High School
- 1998–2001: Komazawa University

Senior career*
Years	Team	Apps	(Gls)
2002–2005	Kawasaki Frontale	25	(0)
2006–2009	Montedio Yamagata	50	(1)
2010	Zweigen Kanazawa	24	(0)
2011–2015	Sakai Phoenix	44	(6)
Total		143	(7)
- * Club domestic league appearances and goals

Makoto Kimura (木村 誠, Kimura Makoto; born June 10, 1979) is a former Japanese football player.

== Playing career ==
Kimura was born in Fukui Prefecture on June 10, 1979. After graduating from Komazawa University, he joined J2 League club Kawasaki Frontale in 2002. Although he could hardly play in the match until 2003, he played many matches and Frontale won the champions in 2004 season. Although Frontale was promoted to J1 League in 2005, he could hardly play in the match. In 2006, he moved to J2 club Montedio Yamagata. He played many matches as left side back in 2006. However he could not play many matches for repeated injuries from 2007. Although Montedio was promoted to J1 in 2009, he could hardly play in the match. In 2010, he moved to Japan Football League club Zweigen Kanazawa and played many matches. In 2011, he moved to Regional Leagues club Maruoka Phoenix (later Sakai Phoenix). He retired at the end of the 2015 season.

== Club statistics ==
Club performance			League		Cup		League Cup		Total	
Season	Club	League	Apps	Goals	Apps	Goals	Apps	Goals	Apps	Goals
Japan			League		Emperor's Cup		J.League Cup		Total	
2002	Kawasaki Frontale	J2 League	0	0	1	0	-		1	0
2003	Kawasaki Frontale	J2 League	1	0	0	0	-		1	0
2004	Kawasaki Frontale	J2 League	23	0	1	0	-		24	0
2005	Kawasaki Frontale	J1 League	1	0	0	0	0	0	1	0
2006	Montedio Yamagata	J2 League	30	1	1	0	-		31	1
2007	Montedio Yamagata	J2 League	9	0	0	0	-		9	0
2008	Montedio Yamagata	J2 League	9	0	0	0	-		9	0
2009	Montedio Yamagata	J1 League	2	0	0	0	0	0	2	0
2010	Zweigen Kanazawa	Football League	24	0	1	0	-		25	0
2011	Maruoka Phoenix	Regional Leagues	5	0	1	0	-		6	0
2012	Sakai Phoenix	Regional Leagues	11	2	-		-		11	2
2013	Sakai Phoenix	Regional Leagues	10	1	-		-		10	1
2014	Sakai Phoenix	Regional Leagues	10	1	-		-		10	1
2015	Sakai Phoenix	Regional Leagues	8	2	-		-		8	2
Career total			143	7	5	0	0	0	148	7
