= 2011 Montedio Yamagata season =

Montedio Yamagata
2011 season
- Manager: Shinji Kobayashi
- J. League Division 1: 18th (relegated to J2)
- Emperor's Cup: Third round
- J. League Cup: First round
Home colours	Away colours

The 2011 Montedio Yamagata season was Montedio Yamagata's third consecutive season in J. League Division 1. It also included the 2011 J. League Cup, and the 2011 Emperor's Cup.

== Competitions ==
=== J. League ===
==== League table ====
Pos	Team	Pld	W	D	L	GF	GA	GD	Pts	Qualification or relegation
14	Albirex Niigata	34	10	9	15	38	46	−8	39	
15	Urawa Red Diamonds	34	8	12	14	36	43	−7	36	
16	Ventforet Kofu (R)	34	9	6	19	42	63	−21	33	Relegation to 2012 J. League Division 2
17	Avispa Fukuoka (R)	34	6	4	24	34	75	−41	22	Relegation to 2012 J. League Division 2
18	Montedio Yamagata (R)	34	5	6	23	23	64	−41	21	Relegation to 2012 J. League Division 2

Updated to match(es) played on December 3, 2011. Source: J.League Division 1
Rules for classification: 1st points; 2nd goal differential; 3rd goals scored; 4th head-to-head results; 5th disciplinary points; 6th draw. If two clubs are tied for first place, both clubs will be declared.
(R) Relegated

==== Matches ====
5 March 2011 Round 1	Kawasaki Frontale	2 - 0	Montedio Yamagata	Kawasaki Todoroki Stadium
Saturday 15:04	Yajima 34', Noborizato 38'	Report		Attendance: 18,673; Referee: Yamamoto

==== Results by round ====
Round	1	2	3	4	5	6	7	8	9	10	11	12	13	14	15	16	17	18	19	20	21	22	23	24	25	26	27	28	29	30	31	32	33	34
Ground	A	A	H	A	H																													
Result	L	L	D	L	L																													
Position	16	18	17	18	18																													

Updated to match(es) played on 6 March 2011. Source: "World-Football.net".
A = Away; H = Home; W = Win; D = Draw; L = Loss

=== Emperor's Cup ===
2011-10-08 Second round	Montedio Yamagata	2 – 0	Blaublitz Akita	ND Soft Stadium Yamagata, Tendō
13:00	Shimomura 23'; Hasegawa 38'	Report		Attendance: 2,425; Referee: Minoru Tojo

2011-11-16 Third round	Montedio Yamagata	2 – 3	Kyoto Sanga	ND Soft Stadium Yamagata, Tendō
19:00	Hasegawa 7'; Miyazawa 9'	Report	Miyayoshi 15', 44', 48'	Attendance: 1,849; Referee: Hiroyuki Kimura
