= Tomohiro Tanaka (footballer) =

Japanese footballer

Tomohiro Tanaka 田中 智大
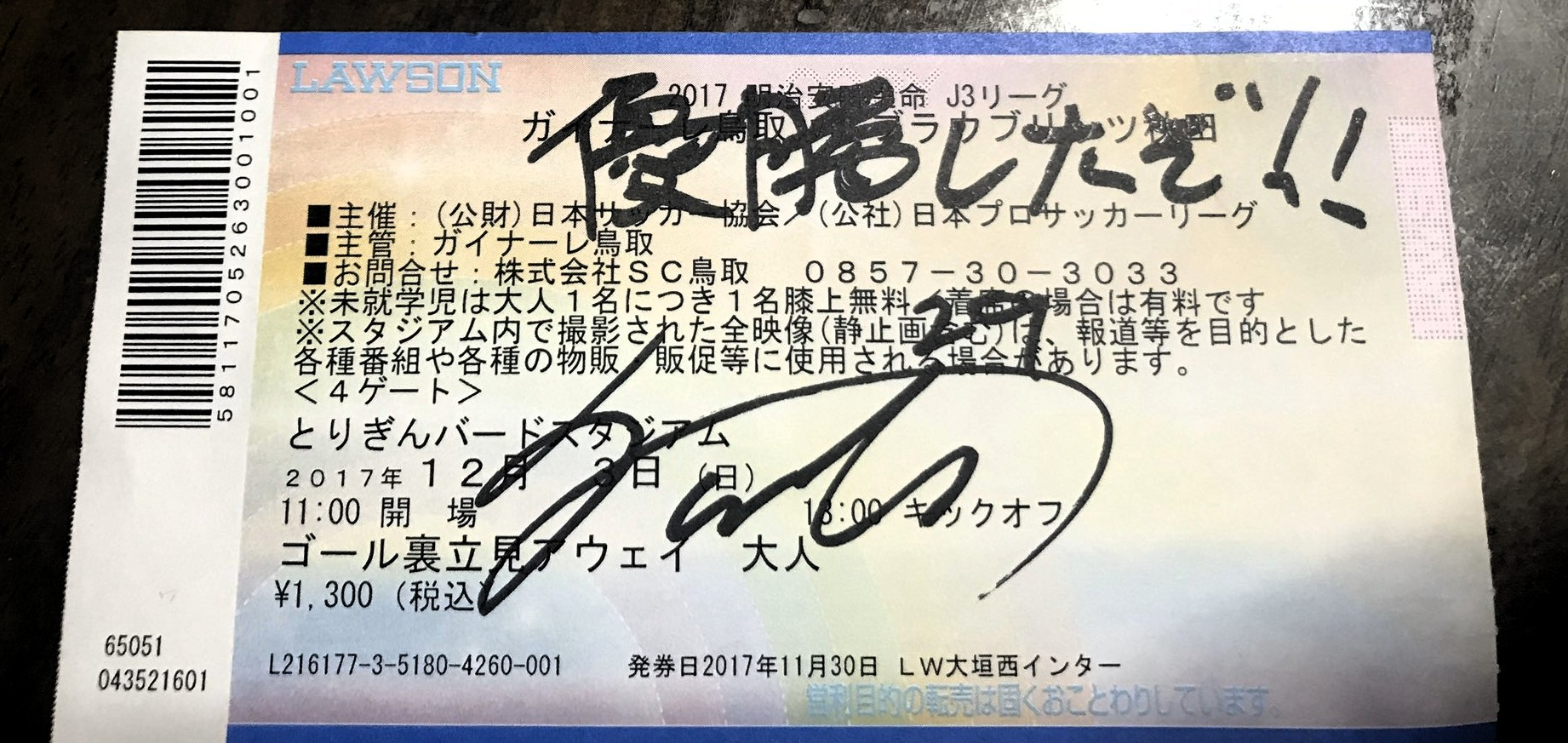

Personal information
- Full name: Tomohiro Tanaka
- Date of birth: January 10, 1991 (age 35)
- Place of birth: Kawasaki, Fukuoka, Japan
- Height: 1.74 m (5 ft 8 1/2 in)
- Position: Forward

Youth career
- 2009–2012: Fukuoka University

Senior career*
| Years | Team | Apps | (Gls) |
| 2013 | FC Gifu SECOND (loan) | 14 | (10) |
| 2014–2015 | FC Gifu | 9 | (1) |
| 2015 | → Gainare Tottori (loan) | 36 | (3) |
| 2016–2018 | Blaublitz Akita | 73 | (29) |
| 2019 | → Kataller Toyama (loan) | 8 | (4) |
- * Club domestic league appearances and goals as of 14 July 2020

Tomohiro Tanaka (田中 智大, Tanaka Tomohiro; born January 10, 1991 in Fukuoka) is a Japanese former football player. He last played for Kataller Toyama.

== Career ==
After a solid career, mostly spent in J3 League, Tanaka retired due to injuries in 2020.

== Club statistics ==
Updated to 23 February 2020.

| Club performance | | | League | | Cup | | Total | |
| Season | Club | League | Apps | Goals | Apps | Goals | Apps | Goals |
| Japan | | | League | | Emperor's Cup | | Total | |
|---|---|---|---|---|---|---|---|---|
| 2013 | FC Gifu SECOND | JRL (Tōkai) | 14 | 10 | 1 | 0 | 15 | 10 |
| 2014 | FC Gifu | J2 League | 9 | 1 | 0 | 0 | 9 | 1 |
| 2015 | FC Gifu | J2 League | 0 | 0 | 0 | 0 | 0 | 0 |
| 2015 | Gainare Tottori | J3 League | 36 | 3 | 1 | 0 | 37 | 3 |
| 2016 | Blaublitz Akita | J3 League | 24 | 8 | 1 | 0 | 25 | 8 |
| 2017 | Blaublitz Akita | J3 League | 31 | 15 | 1 | 1 | 32 | 16 |
| 2018 | Blaublitz Akita | J3 League | 18 | 6 | 1 | 0 | 19 | 6 |
| 2019 | Kataller Toyama | J3 League | 8 | 4 | 1 | 1 | 9 | 5 |
| Total | | | 148 | 46 | 6 | 2 | 154 | 48 |

== Honours ==
Blaublitz Akita

- J3 League (1): 2017
