= Kazuya Maeda (footballer, born 1982) =

Japanese footballer

Personal information
- Full name: Kazuya Maeda
- Date of birth: September 8, 1982 (age 44)
- Place of birth: Wakayama, Japan
- Height: 1.80 m (5 ft 11 in)
- Position: Defender

Youth career
- 2001–2004: Osaka University of Health and Sport Sciences

Senior career*
Years	Team	Apps	(Gls)
2005–2010	Cerezo Osaka	162	(11)
2010–2012	Montedio Yamagata	61	(1)
2013–2017	Giravanz Kitakyushu	138	(4)
- * Club domestic league appearances and goals as of 2 February 2018

Kazuya Maeda (前田 和哉, Maeda Kazuya; born September 8, 1982 in Wakayama) is a former Japanese football player who last featured for Giravanz Kitakyushu.

== Career statistics ==
Updated to 2 February 2018.

Club performance			League		Cup		League Cup		Total	
Season	Club	League	Apps	Goals	Apps	Goals	Apps	Goals	Apps	Goals
Japan			League		Emperor's Cup		League Cup		Total	
2005	Cerezo Osaka	J1 League	23	1	4	1	6	0	33	2
2006	Cerezo Osaka	J1 League	29	1	1	0	8	0	38	1
2007	Cerezo Osaka	J2 League	41	8	2	0	-		43	8
2008	Cerezo Osaka	J2 League	35	0	2	0	-		37	0
2009	Cerezo Osaka	J2 League	34	1	1	0	-		35	1
2010	Cerezo Osaka	J1 League	0	0	-		3	0	3	0
2010	Montedio Yamagata	J1 League	16	0	1	0	-		17	0
2011	Montedio Yamagata	J1 League	21	1	1	0	0	0	22	1
2012	Montedio Yamagata	J2 League	24	0	1	1	-		25	1
2013	Giravanz Kitakyushu	J2 League	41	3	0	0	-		41	3
2014	Giravanz Kitakyushu	J2 League	38	1	4	0	-		42	1
2015	Giravanz Kitakyushu	J2 League	37	0	1	0	-		38	0
2016	Giravanz Kitakyushu	J2 League	21	0	0	0	-		21	0
2017	Giravanz Kitakyushu	J3 League	1	0	0	0	-		1	0
Career total			361	16	20	2	17	0	398	18
