= Yuki Nakashima (footballer) =

Japanese footballer (born 1984)

Yuki Nakashima 中島 裕希
Personal information
- Full name: Yuki Nakashima
- Date of birth: June 16, 1984 (age 42)
- Place of birth: Takaoka, Toyama, Japan
- Height: 1.75 m (5 ft 9 in)
- Position: Forward

Team information
- Current team: Kataller Toyama
- Number: 30

Youth career
- –1996: Seibi SSS
- 1997–1999: FC Higashi
- 2000–2002: Toyama Daiichi High School

Senior career*
Years	Team	Apps	(Gls)
2003–2007	Kashima Antlers	23	(0)
2006–2007	→ Vegalta Sendai (loan)	71	(15)
2008–2012	Vegalta Sendai	110	(16)
2012	→ Montedio Yamagata (loan)	41	(9)
2012–2015	Montedio Yamagata	107	(20)
2016–2026	Machida Zelvia	280	(49)
2026–	Kataller Toyama	6	(0)
Medal record
Kashima Antlers
Runner-up	J.League Cup	2003
Montedio Yamagata
Runner-up	Emperor's Cup	2014
- * Club domestic league appearances and goals as of 16 August 2026

Yuki Nakashima (中島 裕希, Nakashima Yūki; born June 16, 1984) is a Japanese football player who plays for J2 League club Kataller Toyama.

== Playing career ==
Nakashima was born in Takaoka on June 16, 1984. After graduating from high school, he joined J1 League club Kashima Antlers in 2003. He got opportunities to play as substitute forward from first season. In 2006, he moved to J2 League club Vegalta Sendai. He played many matches as substitute forward in 2006 and became a regular forward in 2007. Vegalta won the J2 League title in the 2009 season and was promoted to J1. However his opportunity to play decreased from 2010 season. In 2012, he moved to J2 club Montedio Yamagata and became a regular forward soon. Montedio was promoted to J1 end of 2014 season. Montedio also won the 2nd place in 2014 Emperor's Cup. In 2016, he moved to J2 club Machida Zelvia. In his time with Machida Zelvia, he become the club second highest all-time appearances with 287. He also helped the club to win 2024 J2 League and also the 2025 Emperor's Cup.

== Club statistics ==
As of 25 March 2026

Appearances and goals by club, season and competition
Club	Season	League			National cup (Note: Includes Emperors Cup)		League cup (Note: Includes J.League Cup)		Other		Total	
Club	Season	Division	Apps	Goals	Apps	Goals	Apps	Goals	Apps	Goals	Apps	Goals
Kashima Antlers	2003	J.League Division 1	11	0	0	0	4	0	–		15	0
Kashima Antlers	2004	J.League Division 1	10	0	0	0	5	1	–		15	1
Kashima Antlers	2005	J.League Division 1	2	0	1	1	4	0	–		7	1
Kashima Antlers	Total		23	0	1	1	13	1	0	0	37	2
Vegalta Sendai (loan)	2006	J.League Division 2	24	5	2	0	0	0	0	0	26	5
Vegalta Sendai (loan)	2007	J.League Division 2	47	10	1	0	0	0	0	0	48	10
Vegalta Sendai (loan)	Total		71	15	3	0	0	0	0	0	74	15
Vegalta Sendai	2008	J.League Division 2	31	6	2	1	0	0	2 (Note: Appearance in J.League Promotion/Relegation Series)	0	35	7
Vegalta Sendai	2009	J.League Division 2	38	8	5	3	0	0	0	0	43	11
Vegalta Sendai	2010	J.League Division 1	21	1	0	0	4	1	0	0	25	2
Vegalta Sendai	2011	J.League Division 1	20	1	2	1	2	1	0	0	24	3
Vegalta Sendai	Total		110	16	9	5	6	2	2	0	127	23
Montedio Yamagata (loan)	2012	J.League Division 2	41	9	2	1	0	0	0	0	43	10
Montedio Yamagata	2013	J.League Division 2	40	12	3	0	0	0	0	0	43	12
Montedio Yamagata	2014	J.League Division 2	36	6	2	0	0	0	1 (Note: Appearance in J1/J2 play-offs)	0	39	6
Montedio Yamagata	2015	J1 League	31	2	4	1	6	1	0	0	41	4
Montedio Yamagata	Total		107	20	9	1	6	1	1	0	123	22
FC Machida Zelvia	2016	J2 League	42	14	0	0	0	0	–		42	14
FC Machida Zelvia	2017	J2 League	41	11	0	0	0	0	–		41	11
FC Machida Zelvia	2018	J2 League	42	12	1	0	0	0	–		43	12
FC Machida Zelvia	2019	J2 League	38	3	0	0	0	0	–		38	3
FC Machida Zelvia	2020	J2 League	33	1	0	0	0	0	–		33	1
FC Machida Zelvia	2021	J2 League	41	6	0	0	0	0	–		41	6
FC Machida Zelvia	2022	J2 League	23	1	0	0	0	0	–		23	1
FC Machida Zelvia	2023	J2 League	14	0	3	1	0	0	–		17	1
FC Machida Zelvia	2024	J1 League	6	1	0	0	3	1	–		9	2
FC Machida Zelvia	2025	J1 League	0	0	0	0	0	0	–		0	0
FC Machida Zelvia	Total		280	49	4	1	3	1	0	0	287	51
Kataller Toyama	2026	J2/J3 (100)	4	0	–		–		–		4	0
Career total			636	109	28	9	28	5	3	0	695	123

== Honours ==
=== Club ===
==== Vegalta Sendai ====
- J2 League: 2009

==== Machida Zelvia ====
- J2 League: 2024
- Emperor's Cup: 2025
