= Takuya Miyamoto (footballer, born 1983) =

Japanese footballer (1983–2022)

Personal information
- Date of birth: July 8, 1983
- Place of birth: Hiroshima, Japan
- Date of death: May 1, 2022 (aged 38)
- Height: 1.65 m (5 ft 5 in)
- Position: Defender

Youth career
- 1999–2001: Sanfrecce Hiroshima
- 2002–2005: Osaka University of Commerce

Senior career*
Years	Team	Apps	(Gls)
2006–2007	Cerezo Osaka	43	(0)
2008–2012	Montedio Yamagata	142	(1)
2013	Avispa Fukuoka	22	(0)
Total		207	(1)
- * Club domestic league appearances and goals

Takuya Miyamoto (宮本 卓也, Miyamoto Takuya; July 8, 1983 – May 1, 2022) was a Japanese footballer who played as a defender.

== Career statistics ==
Appearances and goals by club, season and competition
Club	Season	League			Emperor's Cup		League Cup		Total	
Club	Season	Division	Apps	Goals	Apps	Goals	Apps	Goals	Apps	Goals
Cerezo Osaka	2006	J1 League	15	0	0	0	0	0	15	0
Cerezo Osaka	2007	J2 League	28	0	0	0	–		28	0
Cerezo Osaka	Total		43	0	0	0	0	0	43	0
Montedio Yamagata	2008	J2 League	40	0	2	0	–		42	0
Montedio Yamagata	2009	J1 League	32	0	2	0	5	0	39	0
Montedio Yamagata	2010	J1 League	26	0	0	0	5	0	31	0
Montedio Yamagata	2011	J1 League	28	1	2	0	2	0	30	1
Montedio Yamagata	2012	J2 League	16	0	2	0	–		18	0
Montedio Yamagata	Total		142	1	8	0	12	0	162	1
Avispa Fukuoka	2013	J2 League	22	0	1	0	–		23	0
Career total			207	1	9	0	12	0	228	1
