= Ginji Aki =

Japanese football player

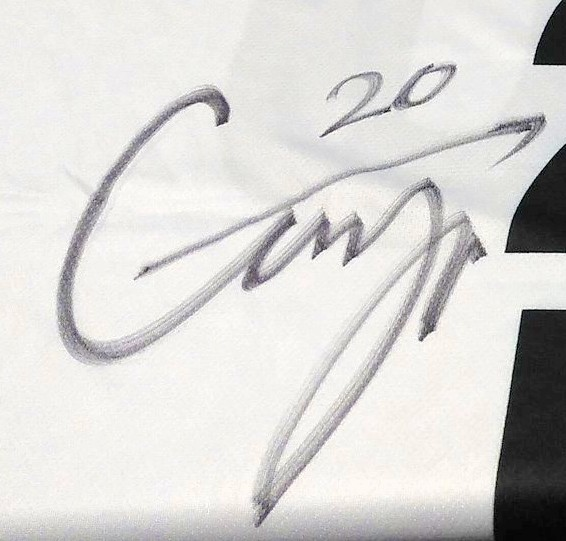

Personal information
- Full name: Ginji Aki
- Date of birth: June 4, 1994 (age 32)
- Place of birth: Matsudo, Chiba, Japan
- Height: 1.81 m (5 ft 11 1/2 in)
- Position: Forward

Youth career
- –2009: Kashiwa Eagles TOR'82
- 2010–2012: Narashino High School

College career
Years	Team	Apps	(Gls)
2013–2016	Ryutsu Keizai University		

Senior career*
Years	Team	Apps	(Gls)
2017	Blaublitz Akita	7	(0)
2018	ReinMeer Aomori	15	(1)
2019	Crumlin United F.C.	2	(0)
2020	Glenville F.C.		
2021	COEDO KAWAGOE F.C		
- * Club domestic league appearances and goals as of 14 September 2021

Ginji Aki (安芸 銀治, Aki Ginji; born June 4, 1994) is a Japanese football player. He played for COEDO KAWAGOE F.C.

== Career ==
Ginji Aki joined J3 League club Blaublitz Akita in 2017.

== Club statistics ==
Updated to 8 December 2019.

Club performance			League		Cup		Total	
Season	Club	League	Apps	Goals	Apps	Goals	Apps	Goals
Japan			League		Emperor's Cup		Total	
2017	Blaublitz Akita	J3 League	7	0	0	0	7	0
2018	ReinMeer Aomori	JFL	15	1	–		15	1
Total			22	1	0	0	22	1

== Honours ==
Blaublitz Akita

- J3 League (1): 2017
