= Hiroki Bandai =

Japanese footballer (born 1986)

Hiroki Bandai 萬代 宏樹
Personal information
- Full name: Hiroki Bandai
- Date of birth: 19 February 1986 (age 40)
- Place of birth: Sendai, Japan
- Height: 1.84 m (6 ft 1/2 in)
- Position: Forward

Youth career
- 2001–2003: Fukushima Higashi High School

Senior career*
Years	Team	Apps	(Gls)
2004–2007	Vegalta Sendai	107	(21)
2008–2009	Júbilo Iwata	27	(3)
2010	Sagan Tosu	26	(2)
2011	Thespa Kusatsu	35	(8)
2012–2015	Montedio Yamagata	94	(11)
2016–2017	Mito HollyHock	14	(1)
2017–2018	Nagano Parceiro	38	(7)
2019–2021	ReinMeer Aomori	61	(13)
Total		402	(66)
Medal record
Montedio Yamagata
Runner-up	Emperor's Cup	2014
- * Club domestic league appearances and goals as of 1 January 2020

Hiroki Bandai (萬代 宏樹, Bandai Hiroki; born 19 February 1986) is a retired professional Japanese footballer.

== Early life ==
Hiroki was born in Sendai. He went to Fukushima Higashi High School.

== Career ==
Hiroki scored his first goal for Jubilo against Gamba Osaka on 15 March 2008, scoring in the 8th minute.

Hiroki made his debut for Sagan against Hokkaido Consadole Sapporo on 7 March 2010. He scored his first goal for Sagan against Giravanz Kitakyushu, scoring in the 67th minute on 29 May 2010.

Hiroki made his debut for Tochigi against Thespakusatsu Gunma on 6 March 2011. He scored his first goal for the club in the 55th minute.

Hiroki made his debut for Montedio against JEF United on 4 March 2012.

Hiroki made his debut for Mito against Kyoto Sanga on 28 February 2016. He scored his first goal for the club against Giravanz, scoring in the 90th+4th minute.

Hiroki made his debut for Nagano on 10 March 2018 against Fujieda MYFC. He scored his first goal for the club against Azul Claro Numazu in the 90th minute.

== Club statistics ==
Updated to 1 January 2020.

Club performance			League		Cup		League Cup		Total	
Season	Club	League	Apps	Goals	Apps	Goals	Apps	Goals	Apps	Goals
Japan			League		Emperor's Cup		J.League Cup		Total	
2004	Vegalta Sendai	J2 League	36	4	1	0	-		37	4
2005	Vegalta Sendai	J2 League	14	1	1	0	-		15	1
2006	Vegalta Sendai	J2 League	17	2	0	0	-		17	2
2007	Vegalta Sendai	J2 League	40	14	0	0	-		40	14
2008	Júbilo Iwata	J1 League	20	3	2	0	5	1	27	4
2009	Júbilo Iwata	J1 League	7	0	1	0	4	0	12	0
2010	Sagan Tosu	J2 League	26	2	2	1	-		28	3
2011	Thespa Kusatsu	J2 League	35	8	1	0	-		36	8
2012	Montedio Yamagata	J2 League	32	4	0	0	-		32	4
2013	Montedio Yamagata	J2 League	27	5	2	0	-		29	5
2014	Montedio Yamagata	J2 League	30	2	3	2	-		33	4
2015	Montedio Yamagata	J1 League	5	0	1	0	5	2	11	2
2016	Mito HollyHock	J2 League	13	1	1	0	-		14	1
2017	Mito HollyHock	J2 League	1	0	1	0	-		2	0
2017	Nagano Parceiro	J3 League	15	4	–		–		15	4
2018	Nagano Parceiro	J3 League	23	3	1	0	-		24	3
2019	ReinMeer Aomori	JFL	30	12	-		-		30	12
Career total			371	65	17	3	14	3	412	71
