= 2016 Montedio Yamagata season =

Montedio Yamagata
2016 season
- Manager: Nobuhiro Ishizaki
- Stadium: Montedio Yamagata
- J2 League: 14th

2016 Montedio Yamagata season.

== J2 League ==
=== League table ===
Pos	Team	Pld	W	D	L	GF	GA	GD	Pts
13	Mito HollyHock	42	10	18	14	45	49	−4	48
14	Montedio Yamagata	42	11	14	17	43	49	−6	47
15	V-Varen Nagasaki	42	10	17	15	39	51	−12	47

Updated to match(es) played on 20 November 2016. Source: 2016 MEIJI YASUDA J2 LEAGUE League table
Rules for classification: 1) Points; 2) Goal difference; 3) Goals scored

=== Match details ===
J2 League match details
Match	Date	Team	Score	Team	Venue	Attendance
1	2016.02.28	Giravanz Kitakyushu	1-0	Montedio Yamagata	Honjo Stadium	4,647
2	2016.03.06	Ehime FC	1-1	Montedio Yamagata	Ningineer Stadium	5,084
3	2016.03.13	Tokushima Vortis	2-2	Montedio Yamagata	Pocarisweat Stadium	4,358
4	2016.03.20	Montedio Yamagata	0-1	Cerezo Osaka	ND Soft Stadium Yamagata	12,603
5	2016.03.26	Montedio Yamagata	0-1	Shimizu S-Pulse	ND Soft Stadium Yamagata	7,161
6	2016.04.03	Kyoto Sanga FC	3-2	Montedio Yamagata	Kyoto Nishikyogoku Athletic Stadium	3,676
7	2016.04.09	Montedio Yamagata	0-1	FC Machida Zelvia	ND Soft Stadium Yamagata	5,320
8	2016.04.17	Montedio Yamagata	1-1	Hokkaido Consadole Sapporo	ND Soft Stadium Yamagata	4,871
9	2016.04.23	Fagiano Okayama	0-1	Montedio Yamagata	City Light Stadium	8,256
11	2016.05.03	Tokyo Verdy	0-1	Montedio Yamagata	Ajinomoto Stadium	5,515
12	2016.05.07	Montedio Yamagata	3-1	Thespakusatsu Gunma	ND Soft Stadium Yamagata	5,362
13	2016.05.15	V-Varen Nagasaki	1-1	Montedio Yamagata	Nagasaki Stadium	4,057
14	2016.05.22	Montedio Yamagata	0-0	Zweigen Kanazawa	ND Soft Stadium Yamagata	6,483
15	2016.05.28	FC Gifu	0-1	Montedio Yamagata	Gifu Nagaragawa Stadium	8,248
16	2016.06.04	Montedio Yamagata	0-0	Yokohama FC	ND Soft Stadium Yamagata	6,659
17	2016.06.08	JEF United Chiba	3-0	Montedio Yamagata	Fukuda Denshi Arena	7,684
18	2016.06.12	Montedio Yamagata	2-1	Kamatamare Sanuki	ND Soft Stadium Yamagata	7,043
19	2016.06.19	Matsumoto Yamaga FC	1-0	Montedio Yamagata	Matsumotodaira Park Stadium	12,141
20	2016.06.26	Montedio Yamagata	2-2	Mito HollyHock	ND Soft Stadium Yamagata	5,113
21	2016.07.03	Montedio Yamagata	2-1	Renofa Yamaguchi FC	ND Soft Stadium Yamagata	4,597
10	2016.07.06	Montedio Yamagata	4-1	Roasso Kumamoto	ND Soft Stadium Yamagata	3,303
22	2016.07.10	FC Machida Zelvia	2-1	Montedio Yamagata	Machida Stadium	4,412
23	2016.07.16	Zweigen Kanazawa	1-0	Montedio Yamagata	Ishikawa Athletics Stadium	4,080
24	2016.07.20	Montedio Yamagata	1-1	JEF United Chiba	ND Soft Stadium Yamagata	4,410
25	2016.07.24	Montedio Yamagata	0-1	Fagiano Okayama	ND Soft Stadium Yamagata	5,312
26	2016.07.31	Kamatamare Sanuki	2-1	Montedio Yamagata	Pikara Stadium	2,494
27	2016.08.07	Thespakusatsu Gunma	2-0	Montedio Yamagata	Shoda Shoyu Stadium Gunma	3,862
28	2016.08.11	Montedio Yamagata	0-0	Kyoto Sanga FC	ND Soft Stadium Yamagata	14,450
29	2016.08.14	Hokkaido Consadole Sapporo	3-1	Montedio Yamagata	Sapporo Dome	20,225
30	2016.08.21	Montedio Yamagata	1-1	FC Gifu	ND Soft Stadium Yamagata	6,005
31	2016.09.11	Shimizu S-Pulse	3-1	Montedio Yamagata	IAI Stadium Nihondaira	8,646
32	2016.09.18	Montedio Yamagata	2-1	Tokushima Vortis	ND Soft Stadium Yamagata	4,772
33	2016.09.25	Roasso Kumamoto	0-0	Montedio Yamagata	Umakana-Yokana Stadium	4,341
34	2016.10.02	Mito HollyHock	1-0	Montedio Yamagata	K's denki Stadium Mito	4,773
35	2016.10.08	Montedio Yamagata	2-2	Ehime FC	ND Soft Stadium Yamagata	3,189
36	2016.10.16	Montedio Yamagata	1-0	Tokyo Verdy	ND Soft Stadium Yamagata	5,584
37	2016.10.23	Cerezo Osaka	2-2	Montedio Yamagata	Kincho Stadium	10,025
38	2016.10.30	Montedio Yamagata	0-1	Matsumoto Yamaga FC	ND Soft Stadium Yamagata	7,257
39	2016.11.03	Yokohama FC	2-1	Montedio Yamagata	NHK Spring Mitsuzawa Football Stadium	6,912
40	2016.11.06	Montedio Yamagata	1-0	V-Varen Nagasaki	ND Soft Stadium Yamagata	5,206
41	2016.11.12	Renofa Yamaguchi FC	2-2	Montedio Yamagata	Ishin Memorial Park Stadium	5,839
42	2016.11.20	Montedio Yamagata	3-0	Giravanz Kitakyushu	ND Soft Stadium Yamagata	6,624
