= Takabayashi Ginji =

Takabayashi Ginji 高林吟二
- Born: October 2, 1902; Tokyo, Japan
- Died: August 12, 1972

Takabayashi Ginji (高林 吟二, Takabayashi Ginji; 1902 – 1972) was a Noh actor who, in 1956, was expelled from the art form, banned from appearing onstage, and from associating with other Noh performers, on charges that he had been "impertinent and offensive" towards the Kita school of Noh, and towards the family of its head (sōke).
