= Masaki Miyasaka =

Japanese footballer (born 1989)

Masaki Miyasaka 宮阪 政樹
Personal information
- Full name: Masaki Miyasaka
- Date of birth: July 15, 1989 (age 37)
- Place of birth: Nerima, Japan
- Height: 1.69 m (5 ft 7 in)
- Position: Midfielder

Team information
- Current team: AC Nagano Parceiro
- Number: 35

Youth career
- 2002–2007: FC Tokyo

College career
Years	Team	Apps	(Gls)
2008–2011	Meiji University		

Senior career*
Years	Team	Apps	(Gls)
2012–2015	Montedio Yamagata	125	(19)
2016–2019	Matsumoto Yamaga	79	(5)
2018	→ Oita Trinita (loan)	21	(1)
2020	Thespakusatsu Gunma	37	(3)
2021-	AC Nagano Parceiro	88	(3)
Medal record
Montedio Yamagata
Runner-up	Emperor's Cup	2014
- * Club domestic league appearances and goals as of 13 January 2024 @ 13:18(AEST)

Masaki Miyasaka (宮阪 政樹, born July 15, 1989) is a Japanese football player for AC Nagano Parceiro

== Club statistics ==
Updated to 24 February 2019.

Club performance			League		Cup		League Cup		Other		Total	
Season	Club	League	Apps	Goals	Apps	Goals	Apps	Goals	Apps	Goals	Apps	Goals
Japan			League		Emperor's Cup		J. League Cup		Other^{1}		Total	
2012	Montedio Yamagata	J2 League	40	6	2	0	-		-		42	6
2013	Montedio Yamagata	J2 League	23	4	2	1	-		-		25	5
2014	Montedio Yamagata	J2 League	42	8	5	0	-		2	0	49	8
2015	Montedio Yamagata	J1 League	18	1	2	0	6	0	-		26	1
2016	Matsumoto Yamaga	J2 League	36	1	2	0	–		–		38	1
2017	Matsumoto Yamaga	J2 League	23	3	0	0	–		–		23	3
2018	Oita Trinita	J2 League	21	1	0	0	–		–		21	1
Total			203	21	13	1	6	0	2	0	224	22

^{1}Includes Promotion Playoffs to J1.
