= 2017 Montedio Yamagata season =

Montedio Yamagata
2017 season
- Manager: Takashi Kiyama
- Stadium: ND Soft Stadium Yamagata
- J2 League: 11th

2017 Montedio Yamagata season.

== J2 League ==
=== League table ===
Pos	Team	Pld	W	D	L	GF	GA	GD	Pts
10	Yokohama FC	42	17	12	13	60	49	+11	63
11	Montedio Yamagata	42	14	17	11	45	47	−2	59
12	Kyoto Sanga	42	14	15	13	55	47	+8	57

Updated to match(es) played on 28 November 2017. Source: 2017 MEIJI YASUDA J2 LEAGUE League table
Rules for classification: 1) Points; 2) Goal difference; 3) Goals scored

=== Match details ===
J2 League match details
Match	Date	Team	Score	Team	Venue	Attendance
1	2017.02.26	Kyoto Sanga FC	1-2	Montedio Yamagata	Kyoto Nishikyogoku Athletic Stadium	8,857
2	2017.03.04	JEF United Chiba	1-1	Montedio Yamagata	Fukuda Denshi Arena	11,807
3	2017.03.12	Roasso Kumamoto	1-1	Montedio Yamagata	Egao Kenko Stadium	6,628
4	2017.03.19	Montedio Yamagata	0-0	Kamatamare Sanuki	ND Soft Stadium Yamagata	9,828
5	2017.03.26	Montedio Yamagata	0-0	Avispa Fukuoka	ND Soft Stadium Yamagata	6,110
6	2017.04.02	V-Varen Nagasaki	2-0	Montedio Yamagata	Transcosmos Stadium Nagasaki	3,718
7	2017.04.09	Montedio Yamagata	3-2	Oita Trinita	ND Soft Stadium Yamagata	4,822
8	2017.04.15	Montedio Yamagata	1-0	Tokyo Verdy	ND Soft Stadium Yamagata	4,677
9	2017.04.23	Fagiano Okayama	2-1	Montedio Yamagata	City Light Stadium	8,104
10	2017.04.29	Ehime FC	2-0	Montedio Yamagata	Ningineer Stadium	3,455
11	2017.05.03	Montedio Yamagata	0-0	Mito HollyHock	ND Soft Stadium Yamagata	7,553
12	2017.05.07	Montedio Yamagata	0-0	Nagoya Grampus	ND Soft Stadium Yamagata	9,573
13	2017.05.13	Zweigen Kanazawa	1-1	Montedio Yamagata	Ishikawa Athletics Stadium	2,780
14	2017.05.17	Montedio Yamagata	1-0	Matsumoto Yamaga FC	ND Soft Stadium Yamagata	5,206
15	2017.05.21	Montedio Yamagata	3-2	Renofa Yamaguchi FC	ND Soft Stadium Yamagata	6,936
16	2017.05.27	Shonan Bellmare	0-1	Montedio Yamagata	Shonan BMW Stadium Hiratsuka	9,118
17	2017.06.03	FC Gifu	1-1	Montedio Yamagata	Gifu Nagaragawa Stadium	11,364
18	2017.06.11	Montedio Yamagata	1-0	Thespakusatsu Gunma	ND Soft Stadium Yamagata	6,639
19	2017.06.17	Yokohama FC	0-1	Montedio Yamagata	NHK Spring Mitsuzawa Football Stadium	5,113
20	2017.06.25	Montedio Yamagata	1-6	Tokushima Vortis	ND Soft Stadium Yamagata	5,795
21	2017.07.01	Montedio Yamagata	1-3	FC Machida Zelvia	ND Soft Stadium Yamagata	5,423
22	2017.07.09	Renofa Yamaguchi FC	2-0	Montedio Yamagata	Ishin Memorial Park Stadium	4,567
23	2017.07.16	Nagoya Grampus	1-0	Montedio Yamagata	Paloma Mizuho Stadium	11,251
24	2017.07.22	Montedio Yamagata	3-0	Shonan Bellmare	ND Soft Stadium Yamagata	7,529
25	2017.07.29	Avispa Fukuoka	2-0	Montedio Yamagata	Level5 Stadium	7,127
26	2017.08.05	Thespakusatsu Gunma	0-1	Montedio Yamagata	Shoda Shoyu Stadium Gunma	2,670
27	2017.08.11	Montedio Yamagata	2-1	Zweigen Kanazawa	ND Soft Stadium Yamagata	12,743
28	2017.08.16	Matsumoto Yamaga FC	3-2	Montedio Yamagata	Matsumotodaira Park Stadium	12,146
29	2017.08.20	Montedio Yamagata	2-2	JEF United Chiba	ND Soft Stadium Yamagata	7,044
30	2017.08.26	Tokushima Vortis	1-1	Montedio Yamagata	Pocarisweat Stadium	4,567
31	2017.09.02	Montedio Yamagata	1-1	Fagiano Okayama	ND Soft Stadium Yamagata	5,215
32	2017.09.09	Montedio Yamagata	2-2	Kyoto Sanga FC	ND Soft Stadium Yamagata	5,970
33	2017.09.16	FC Machida Zelvia	0-0	Montedio Yamagata	Machida Stadium	2,519
34	2017.09.24	Montedio Yamagata	0-1	Roasso Kumamoto	ND Soft Stadium Yamagata	5,877
35	2017.09.30	Montedio Yamagata	0-0	V-Varen Nagasaki	ND Soft Stadium Yamagata	4,785
36	2017.10.07	Tokyo Verdy	3-1	Montedio Yamagata	Ajinomoto Stadium	5,355
37	2017.10.14	Montedio Yamagata	2-0	Yokohama FC	ND Soft Stadium Yamagata	7,052
38	2017.10.22	Kamatamare Sanuki	0-0	Montedio Yamagata	Pikara Stadium	1,191
39	2017.10.29	Montedio Yamagata	2-2	Ehime FC	ND Soft Stadium Yamagata	3,707
40	2017.11.05	Oita Trinita	1-1	Montedio Yamagata	Oita Bank Dome	9,822
41	2017.11.12	Mito HollyHock	0-1	Montedio Yamagata	K's denki Stadium Mito	7,573
42	2017.11.19	Montedio Yamagata	4-1	FC Gifu	ND Soft Stadium Yamagata	5,748
