= André Pinto (footballer, born 1978) =

Brazilian footballer

Personal information
- Full name: André Candançam Pinto
- Date of birth: 14 December 1978 (age 47)
- Place of birth: São Paulo, Brazil
- Height: 1.84 m (6 ft 1/2 in)
- Position: Striker

Senior career*
Years	Team	Apps	(Gls)
1997–2001	Flamengo-SP		
2001–2002	XV Piracicaba		
2002	Portuguesa-RJ	7	(0)
2003–2006	Nacional	59	(21)
2003–2004	→ Santa Clara (loan)	30	(15)
2006–2007	Kyoto Sanga	42	(18)
2008–2010	Marítimo	4	(0)
2009–2010	→ Paços Ferreira (loan)	7	(2)
2010	São José		
- * Club domestic league appearances and goals

André Candançam Pinto (born 14 December 1978) is a Brazilian former professional footballer who played as a striker.

== Club career ==
In his country, São Paulo-born Pinto played for Associação Atlética Flamengo, Esporte Clube XV de Novembro (Piracicaba) and Associação Atlética Portuguesa (RJ). In January 2003 he moved to Portugal and joined C.D. Nacional, appearing in only ten Primeira Liga matches over his first two seasons and also being loaned to C.D. Santa Clara in the Segunda Liga; he made his debut in the former competition on 2 February 2003, scoring in a local derby against C.S. Marítimo, a 3–2 away win.

Pinto returned to Madeira for a further two seasons with Nacional, netting 14 times in 30 games in his second as the club qualified for the second time in its history for the UEFA Cup after finishing fifth. Highlights included braces against Académica de Coimbra (2–2 home draw), Boavista FC (3–0 away win), Vitória de Setúbal (2–2, home) and C.F. Os Belenenses (4–0, at home).

Subsequently, Pinto spent two years in Japan with Kyoto Sanga FC, scoring only three goals in his first season, which ended in relegation from the J1 League. On 31 January 2008, he returned to Portugal and signed for Marítimo as a replacement for S.L. Benfica-bound Ariza Makukula, but the following two campaigns in the country, with that side and F.C. Paços de Ferreira, yielded only a total of 11 appearances and two goals.

In 2010, Pinto returned to his homeland after eight years away, joining amateurs São José Esporte Clube.
