= Shogo Nishikawa =

Japanese footballer

Shogo Nishikawa 西河 翔吾
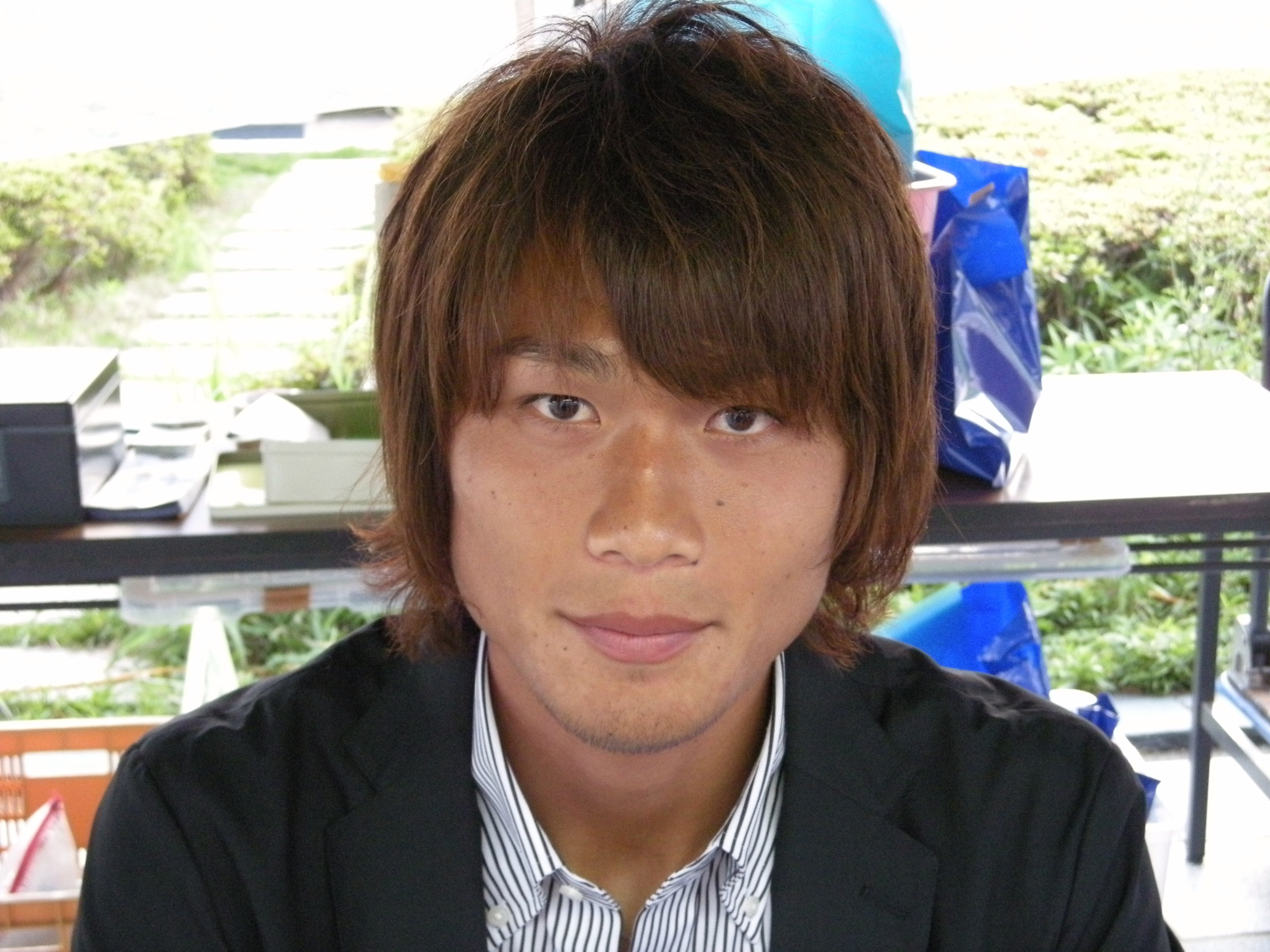

Personal information
- Full name: Shogo Nishikawa
- Date of birth: July 1, 1983 (age 43)
- Place of birth: Hiroshima, Japan
- Height: 1.82 m (5 ft 11 1/2 in)
- Position: Centre back

Youth career
- 1999–2001: Numata High School
- 2002–2004: Hiroshima Shudo University

Senior career*
Years	Team	Apps	(Gls)
2004–2009	Sanfrecce Hiroshima	20	(0)
2006–2008	→ Tokushima Vortis (loan)	85	(3)
2009–2015	Montedio Yamagata	143	(9)
2016–2017	Yokohama FC	77	(3)
2018	Tochigi SC	18	(1)
2019	FC Ryukyu	6	(0)
Medal record
Montedio Yamagata
Runner-up	Emperor's Cup	2014
- * Club domestic league appearances and goals

Shogo Nishikawa (西河 翔吾, Nishikawa Shōgo; born July 1, 1983) is a Japanese retired football player.

== Club statistics ==
Updated to 23 February 2018.

Club performance			League		Cup		League Cup		Total	
Season	Club	League	Apps	Goals	Apps	Goals	Apps	Goals	Apps	Goals
Japan			League		Emperor's Cup		J.League Cup		Total	
2004	Sanfrecce Hiroshima	J1 League	5	0	0	0	1	0	6	0
2005	Sanfrecce Hiroshima	J1 League	13	0	2	0	0	0	15	0
2006	Sanfrecce Hiroshima	J1 League	2	0	-		3	0	5	0
2006	Tokushima Vortis	J2 League	8	0	1	0	-		9	0
2007	Tokushima Vortis	J2 League	42	1	1	0	-		43	1
2008	Tokushima Vortis	J2 League	35	2	1	0	-		36	2
2009	Sanfrecce Hiroshima	J1 League	0	0	-		0	0	0	0
2009	Montedio Yamagata	J1 League	14	1	2	0	-		16	1
2010	Montedio Yamagata	J1 League	18	1	4	1	3	0	25	2
2011	Montedio Yamagata	J1 League	11	0	0	0	1	0	12	0
2012	Montedio Yamagata	J2 League	37	1	2	1	-		39	2
2013	Montedio Yamagata	J2 League	22	4	3	0	-		25	4
2014	Montedio Yamagata	J2 League	14	0	0	0	-		14	0
2015	Montedio Yamagata	J1 League	27	2	2	0	5	0	34	2
2016	Yokohama FC	J2 League	42	1	1	0	-		43	1
2017	Yokohama FC	J2 League	35	2	1	0	-		36	2
Career total			315	15	20	2	13	0	348	17
