= Hidenori Ishii =

Japanese footballer

Hidenori Ishii 石井 秀典
Personal information
- Full name: Hidenori Ishii
- Date of birth: 23 September 1985 (age 41)
- Place of birth: Chiba, Japan
- Height: 1.80 m (5 ft 11 in)
- Position: Defender

Team information
- Current team: Tokushima Vortis
- Number: 5

Youth career
- 2001–2003: Municipal Funabashi; High School
- 2004–2007: Meiji University

Senior career*
Years	Team	Apps	(Gls)
2008–2014	Montedio Yamagata	179	(9)
2015–	Tokushima Vortis	103	(3)
Medal record
Montedio Yamagata
Runner-up	Emperor's Cup	2014
- * Club domestic league appearances and goals as of 30 December 2018

Hidenori Ishii (石井 秀典, Ishii Hidenori; born 23 September 1985 in Chiba) is a Japanese footballer who plays for Tokushima Vortis.

== Career ==
Ishii signed in 2008 for Montedio Yamagata, but he joined Tokushima Vortis after seven seasons in Yamagata.

== Club career stats ==
Updated to end of 2018 season.

Club performance			League		Cup		Other		League Cup		Total	
Season	Club	League	Apps	Goals	Apps	Goals	Apps	Goals	Apps	Goals	Apps	Goals
Japan			League		Emperor's Cup		League Cup		Other^{1}		Total	
2008	Montedio Yamagata	J2 League	36	2	2	1	-		-		38	3
2009	Montedio Yamagata	J1 League	16	0	0	0	6	0	-		22	0
2010	Montedio Yamagata	J1 League	28	1	3	0	6	0	-		37	1
2011	Montedio Yamagata	J1 League	30	1	1	0	1	0	-		32	1
2012	Montedio Yamagata	J2 League	28	4	1	0	-		-		29	4
2013	Montedio Yamagata	J2 League	20	0	0	0	-		-		20	0
2014	Montedio Yamagata	J2 League	21	1	5	0	-		2	0	28	1
2015	Tokushima Vortis	J2 League	31	0	2	1	–		–		33	1
2016	Tokushima Vortis	J2 League	33	2	1	0	–		–		34	2
2017	Tokushima Vortis	J2 League	11	0	1	0	–		–		12	0
2018	Tokushima Vortis	J2 League	28	1	1	0	–		–		29	1
Career total			282	12	17	2	13	0	2	0	314	14

^{1}Includes Promotion Playoffs to J1.
