= 2007 J.League Division 2 =

J.League Division 2
- Season: 2007
- Champions: Consadole Sapporo; 2nd J2 title 5th D2 title
- Promoted: Consadole Sapporo; Tokyo Verdy 1969; Kyoto Sanga
- Matches: 312
- Goals: 782 (2.51 per match)
- Top goalscorer: Hulk (37 goals total)
- Highest attendance: 32,599 (Round 50, Consadole vs. Sanga)
- Lowest attendance: 958 (Round 11, HollyHock vs. Bellmare)
- Average attendance: 6,521

The 2007 J. League Division 2 season was the 36th season of the second-tier club football in Japan and the 9th season since the establishment of J2 League. The season began on March 3 and ended on December 1.

In this season, thirteen clubs competed in the quadruple round-robin format for the top two promotion slots. Farther, the third placed-finisher participated in the Pro/Rele Series for the promotion. There were no relegation to the third-tier Japan Football League.

== General ==
=== Promotion and relegation ===
- At the end of the 2006 season, Yokohama FC, Kashiwa Reysol, and Vissel Kobe were promoted to J1
- At the end of the 2006 season, Avispa Fukuoka, Cerezo Osaka, and Kyoto Purple Sanga were relegated to J2.

=== Changes in competition format ===
none

=== Changes in clubs ===
- Kyoto Purple Sanga was renamed to Kyoto Sanga F.C.

== Clubs ==
Locations of the 2007 J.League 2 teams

Following thirteen clubs played in J. League Division 2 during 2007 season. Of these clubs, Avispa Fukuoka, Cerezo Osaka, and Kyoto Sanga F.C. relegated from J1 last year.

- Consadole Sapporo
- Vegalta Sendai
- Montedio Yamagata
- Mito HollyHock
- Thespa Kusatsu
- Tokyo Verdy 1969
- Shonan Bellmare
- Kyoto Sanga F.C.
- Cerezo Osaka
- Tokushima Vortis
- Ehime F.C.
- Avispa Fukuoka
- Sagan Tosu

== League format ==
Thirteen clubs will play in quadruple round-robin format, a total of 48 games each. A club receives 3 points for a win, 1 point for a tie, and 0 points for a loss. The clubs are ranked by points, and tie breakers are, in the following order:

- Goal differential
- Goals scored
- Head-to-head results

A draw would be conducted, if necessary. However, if two clubs are tied at the first place, both clubs will be declared as the champions. The top two clubs will be promoted to J1, while the 3rd placed club plays a two-legged promotion/relegation series.

Changes from previous year

none

== Final league table ==
Pos	Team	Pld	W	D	L	GF	GA	GD	Pts	Promotion
1	Consadole Sapporo (C, P)	48	27	10	11	66	45	+21	91	Promotion to 2008 J. League Division 1
2	Tokyo Verdy 1969 (P)	48	26	11	11	90	57	+33	89	Promotion to 2008 J. League Division 1
3	Kyoto Sanga (P)	48	24	14	10	80	59	+21	86	2007 promotion/relegation Series
4	Vegalta Sendai	48	24	11	13	72	54	+18	83	
5	Cerezo Osaka	48	24	8	16	72	55	+17	80	
6	Shonan Bellmare	48	23	8	17	72	55	+17	77	
7	Avispa Fukuoka	48	22	7	19	77	61	+16	73	
8	Sagan Tosu	48	21	9	18	63	66	−3	72	
9	Montedio Yamagata	48	15	13	20	46	56	−10	58	
10	Ehime FC	48	12	9	27	39	66	−27	45	
11	Thespa Kusatsu	48	7	21	20	42	71	−29	42	
12	Mito HollyHock	48	8	10	30	32	70	−38	34	
13	Tokushima Vortis	48	6	15	27	31	67	−36	33	

Updated to match(es) played on December 1, 2007. Source: J. League Division 2
Rules for classification: 1) points; 2) goal difference; 3) number of goals scored.
(C) Champions; (P) Promoted

== Final results ==
Rounds 1 & 2
Home \ Away	CON	VER	SAN	VEG	CER	BEL	AVI	SAG	MON	EHI	SPA	HOL	VOR
Consadole Sapporo		4–3	2–0	1–0	1–0	0–0	0–0	1–0	1–1	1–0	2–2	3–0	1–1
Tokyo Verdy 1969	0–1		1–3	2–1	2–0	1–0	4–2	3–1	1–0	0–1	5–0	1–5	0–3
Kyoto Sanga	2–0	1–4		5–1	1–1	0–0	2–1	1–1	3–0	2–1	1–1	2–1	1–1
Vegalta Sendai	1–1	2–2	0–1		1–0	2–1	1–0	5–2	2–0	3–0	1–1	2–0	1–2
Cerezo Osaka	0–1	0–2	3–2	0–2		1–4	2–0	3–0	1–0	0–2	1–0	0–0	1–1
Shonan Bellmare	1–2	3–0	2–4	1–2	2–1		0–2	4–1	0–4	0–0	3–2	2–0	2–1
Avispa Fukuoka	1–2	2–1	2–4	1–2	2–2	2–0		1–2	1–1	1–0	2–0	3–0	2–1
Sagan Tosu	0–1	2–1	2–0	1–0	1–0	0–5	0–5		2–1	0–1	2–0	5–1	1–0
Montedio Yamagata	0–1	1–1	1–1	3–3	2–1	1–0	1–2	2–1		3–1	1–1	1–2	0–0
Ehime FC	2–1	1–3	3–0	0–4	0–2	0–4	0–0	0–2	0–1		0–1	0–0	0–1
Thespa Kusatsu	2–1	0–0	0–1	1–3	0–2	2–0	0–3	1–1	0–2	0–2		1–0	0–0
Mito HollyHock	0–2	0–1	0–2	1–3	1–3	0–2	1–4	0–1	0–1	3–0	1–3		1–1
Tokushima Vortis	0–3	0–1	0–4	2–2	0–4	0–2	0–1	1–1	0–1	2–1	0–0	0–0	

Updated to match(es) played on July 7, 2007. Source: J. League Division 2
Legend: Blue = home team win; Yellow = draw; Red = away team win.

Rounds 3 & 4
Home \ Away	CON	VER	SAN	VEG	CER	BEL	AVI	SAG	MON	EHI	SPA	HOL	VOR
Consadole Sapporo		2–2	2–2	0–1	3–0	1–2	2–1	1–1	3–0	1–1	2–1	2–1	1–0
Tokyo Verdy 1969	5–1		1–1	1–1	4–0	3–0	2–0	3–2	1–1	2–1	3–1	2–0	1–0
Kyoto Sanga	2–3	1–2		1–0	2–2	2–1	4–3	1–0	2–1	3–1	1–1	2–1	1–1
Vegalta Sendai	0–2	1–4	1–0		2–1	2–3	1–0	1–0	1–1	0–1	1–1	1–1	2–0
Cerezo Osaka	1–0	2–2	2–1	4–3		2–2	4–0	2–1	3–0	4–2	2–1	2–0	3–1
Shonan Bellmare	3–0	1–1	2–2	0–1	1–0		1–2	3–1	1–1	1–1	2–1	2–1	2–0
Avispa Fukuoka	0–1	2–1	1–1	0–1	0–1	0–1		1–3	3–0	2–0	2–1	3–2	2–0
Sagan Tosu	1–0	3–1	3–0	0–3	0–2	2–1	3–1		0–0	0–1	1–1	0–0	2–1
Montedio Yamagata	0–1	0–2	1–2	1–1	0–1	0–1	1–2	1–3		1–0	2–0	1–0	2–0
Ehime FC	0–1	1–1	0–1	3–0	0–2	2–1	3–3	1–2	3–1		1–3	0–0	1–0
Thespa Kusatsu	0–3	2–2	1–1	1–1	2–2	0–1	1–5	2–2	1–1	1–0		0–0	0–0
Mito HollyHock	2–1	1–2	1–2	0–1	1–0	0–2	1–1	0–2	0–1	1–0	0–0		1–0
Tokushima Vortis	3–0	0–3	0–2	1–2	0–2	2–0	0–3	2–2	0–1	1–1	2–2	0–1	

Updated to match(es) played on December 1, 2007. Source: J. League Division 2
Legend: Blue = home team win; Yellow = draw; Red = away team win.

== Top scorers ==
Pos	Scorer	Club	Goals
1	(Brazil) Hulk	Tokyo Verdy 1969	37
2	(Brazil) Alex	Avispa Fukuoka	26
3	(Japan) Yoshihito Fujita	Sagan Tosu	24
3	(Brazil) Paulinho	Kyoto Sanga	24
5	(Japan) Tatsuya Furuhashi	Cerezo Osaka	18
6	(Brazil) Davi	Consadole Sapporo	17
7	(Brazil) Lincoln	Avispa Fukuoka	16
8	(Brazil) Andre	Kyoto Sanga	15
9	(Japan) Hiroki Bandai	Vegalta Sendai	14
9	(Brazil) Lopes	Vegalta Sendai	14

== Attendance ==
Pos	Team	Total	High	Low	Average	Change
1	Vegalta Sendai	352,432	19,033	11,301	14,685	+1.6%
2	Consadole Sapporo	290,676	32,599	2,161	12,112	+15.6%
3	Avispa Fukuoka	228,702	17,361	2,724	9,529	−30.8%^{†}
4	Tokyo Verdy 1969	175,850	16,342	2,481	7,327	+28.4%
5	Kyoto Sanga	159,105	17,163	2,507	6,629	−32.2%^{†}
6	Cerezo Osaka	159,044	20,170	2,711	6,627	−49.1%^{†}
7	Sagan Tosu	146,731	16,661	2,860	6,114	−18.1%
8	Shonan Bellmare	112,254	7,968	3,092	4,677	−12.8%
9	Montedio Yamagata	101,836	9,190	1,944	4,243	−16.6%
10	Thespa Kusatsu	91,401	6,817	2,061	3,808	+1.9%
11	Ehime FC	79,619	6,381	1,933	3,317	−19.9%
12	Tokushima Vortis	78,936	6,566	1,802	3,289	−5.4%
13	Mito HollyHock	57,957	6,543	958	2,415	−20.0%
	League total	2,034,543	32,599	958	6,521	+1.8%

Updated to games played on December 1, 2007
Source: J. League Division 2
Notes:
^{†} Team played previous season in J1.
