= Ryo Kobayashi =

Japanese footballer

Personal information
- Full name: Ryo Kobayashi
- Date of birth: September 12, 1982 (age 44)
- Place of birth: Chūō-ku, Saitama, Japan
- Height: 1.70 m (5 ft 7 in)
- Position: Defender

Youth career
- 2001–2004: Komazawa University

Senior career*
Years	Team	Apps	(Gls)
2005–2007	Kashiwa Reysol	74	(5)
2008	Oita Trinita	18	(1)
2009–2014	Montedio Yamagata	124	(1)
2015	Thespakusatsu Gunma	34	(1)
Total		250	(8)
Medal record
Oita Trinita
Winner	J.League Cup	2008
Montedio Yamagata
Runner-up	Emperor's Cup	2014
- * Club domestic league appearances and goals

Ryo Kobayashi (小林 亮, Kobayashi Ryō; born September 12, 1982) is a former Japanese football player. He is the current first-team coach J2 League club of Thespakusatsu Gunma. His brother is Yoshiyuki Kobayashi.

== Club statistics ==
Club performance			League		Cup		League Cup		Total	
Season	Club	League	Apps	Goals	Apps	Goals	Apps	Goals	Apps	Goals
Japan			League		Emperor's Cup		League Cup		Total	
2005	Kashiwa Reysol	J1 League	21	1	2	0	4	0	27	1
2006	Kashiwa Reysol	J2 League	44	4	2	0	-		46	4
2007	Kashiwa Reysol	J1 League	9	0	0	0	4	0	13	0
2008	Oita Trinita	J1 League	18	1	1	0	7	1	26	2
2009	Montedio Yamagata	J1 League	25	0	1	0	6	0	32	0
2010	Montedio Yamagata	J1 League	16	0	4	0	0	0	20	0
2011	Montedio Yamagata	J1 League								
Career total			133	6	10	0	21	1	164	7
