= Masaru Akiba =

Japanese footballer

Masaru Akiba 秋葉 勝
Personal information
- Full name: Masaru Akiba
- Date of birth: February 19, 1984 (age 42)
- Place of birth: Kaminoyama, Yamagata, Japan
- Height: 1.73 m (5 ft 8 in)
- Position: Midfielder

Youth career
- 1999–2001: Montedio Yamagata

Senior career*
| Years | Team | Apps | (Gls) |
| 2002–2014 | Montedio Yamagata | 360 | (28) |
| 2015 | Zweigen Kanazawa | 42 | (2) |
| 2016 | FC Gifu | 1 | (0) |
| 2016–2017 | Zweigen Kanazawa | 21 | (0) |
| Total | | 424 | (30) |
Medal record
Montedio Yamagata
| Runner-up | Emperor's Cup | 2014 |
- * Club domestic league appearances and goals

Masaru Akiba (秋葉 勝, Akiba Masaru; born February 19, 1984) is a former Japanese football player.

== Playing career ==
Akiba was born in Kaminoyama on February 19, 1984. He joined the J2 League club Montedio Yamagata from his youth team in 2002. He played many matches as defensive midfielder during the first season and became a regular player in 2006. Montedio won second place in the 2008 season and was promoted to the J1 League for the first time in club history. However the club's results were sluggish in J1 and it was relegated to J2 at the end of the 2011 season. Montedio won sixth place in the 2014 season and was promoted to J1 again. Montedio also won second place in the 2014 Emperor's Cup. However he moved to the newly promoted J2 League club Zweigen Kanazawa in 2015 without playing in the J1 league. At Zweigen, he played as a regular player. In 2016, he moved to the J2 club FC Gifu. However he did not play in any games. In July 2016, he re-joined Zweigen Kanazawa. He played often in 2016. However he did not play much in 2017 and retired at the end of the 2017 season.

== Club statistics ==
| Club performance | | | League | | Cup | | League Cup | | Total | |
| Season | Club | League | Apps | Goals | Apps | Goals | Apps | Goals | Apps | Goals |
| Japan | | | League | | Emperor's Cup | | J.League Cup | | Total | |
|---|---|---|---|---|---|---|---|---|---|---|
| 2002 | Montedio Yamagata | J2 League | 7 | 0 | 0 | 0 | - | | 7 | 0 |
| 2003 | Montedio Yamagata | J2 League | 17 | 0 | 1 | 0 | - | | 18 | 0 |
| 2004 | Montedio Yamagata | J2 League | 31 | 1 | 2 | 0 | - | | 33 | 1 |
| 2005 | Montedio Yamagata | J2 League | 11 | 1 | 1 | 0 | - | | 12 | 1 |
| 2006 | Montedio Yamagata | J2 League | 30 | 2 | 2 | 0 | - | | 32 | 2 |
| 2007 | Montedio Yamagata | J2 League | 43 | 3 | 2 | 0 | - | | 45 | 3 |
| 2008 | Montedio Yamagata | J2 League | 32 | 5 | 0 | 0 | - | | 32 | 5 |
| 2009 | Montedio Yamagata | J1 League | 31 | 2 | 2 | 0 | 6 | 1 | 39 | 3 |
| 2010 | Montedio Yamagata | J1 League | 25 | 1 | 2 | 0 | 5 | 2 | 32 | 3 |
| 2011 | Montedio Yamagata | J1 League | 31 | 1 | 1 | 0 | 1 | 0 | 33 | 1 |
| 2012 | Montedio Yamagata | J2 League | 41 | 8 | 2 | 0 | - | | 43 | 8 |
| 2013 | Montedio Yamagata | J2 League | 34 | 3 | 2 | 0 | - | | 36 | 3 |
| 2014 | Montedio Yamagata | J2 League | 27 | 1 | 0 | 0 | - | | 27 | 1 |
| Total | | | 360 | 28 | 17 | 0 | 12 | 3 | 389 | 31 |
| 2015 | Zweigen Kanazawa | J2 League | 42 | 2 | 1 | 0 | - | | 43 | 2 |
| Total | | | 42 | 2 | 1 | 0 | - | | 43 | 2 |
| 2016 | FC Gifu | J2 League | 1 | 0 | 0 | 0 | – | | 1 | 0 |
| Total | | | 1 | 0 | 0 | 0 | – | | 1 | 0 |
| 2016 | Zweigen Kanazawa | J2 League | 17 | 0 | 0 | 0 | - | | 17 | 0 |
| 2017 | Zweigen Kanazawa | J2 League | 4 | 0 | 0 | 0 | - | | 4 | 0 |
| Total | | | 21 | 0 | 0 | 0 | - | | 21 | 0 |
| Career total | | | 424 | 32 | 18 | 0 | 12 | 3 | 454 | 35 |
