= Tatsushi Koyanagi =

Japanese footballer

Tatsushi Koyanagi 小柳 達司
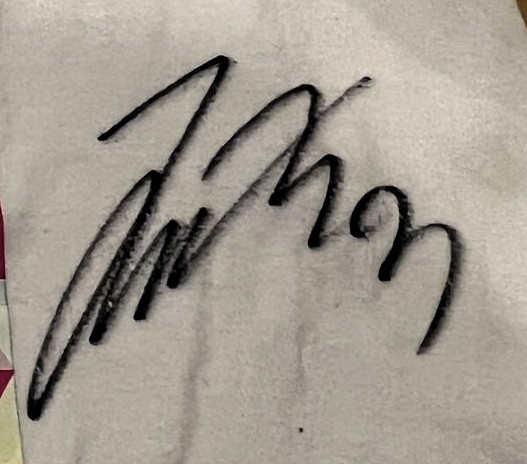

Personal information
- Full name: Tatsushi Koyanagi
- Date of birth: February 7, 1990 (age 36)
- Place of birth: Ichikawa, Chiba, Japan
- Height: 1.80 m (5 ft 11 in)
- Position: Defender

Team information
- Current team: Thespa Gunma
- Number: 30

Youth career
- Waseda Tsutsumi FC
- 2002–2004: Waseda Junior High School
- 2005–2007: Senshu University Matsudo High School

College career
Years	Team	Apps	(Gls)
2008–2011	Nippon Sport Science University		

Senior career*
Years	Team	Apps	(Gls)
2012–2015	Thespakusatsu Gunma	127	(3)
2016–2018	Zweigen Kanazawa	60	(0)
2018	→ Thespakusatsu Gunma (loan)	15	(1)
2019–2021	Ventforet Kofu	79	(3)
2022–2024	Blaublitz Akita	67	(1)
2024–	Thespa Gunma	28	(1)
- * Club domestic league appearances and goals as of 25 August 2026

Tatsushi Koyanagi (小柳 達司, born February 7, 1990) is a Japanese football player who plays as a defender for J3 League club Thespa Gunma.

== Career ==
Koyanagi was born in Ichikawa, Chiba and raised in Misato, Saitama. He attended Senshu University Matsudo High School. After graduating from Nippon Sport Science University, he joined J2 League club Thespa Kusatsu in 2012 and made his professional debut as a starter on 1 April. In his second season he netted his first professional goal on 1 June 2013, and two other goals. He signed his second professional contract with Zweigen Kanazawa in 2016. Koyanagi also scored the headed goal against Blaublitz Akita on Match week 26, 7 October 2018. In his 9th season he played with Venforet Kofu and bagged the goal on Matchweek 26. In the year of 2020 he chalked up two goals against Kanazawa on Matchweek 4 and 24. In 2022, Koyanagi signed for Blaublitz Akita and gave an assist to Shota Aoki on Matchweek 8.

== Club statistics ==
Updated to 26 December 2022.

Club performance			League		Cup		Total	
Season	Club	League	Apps	Goals	Apps	Goals	Apps	Goals
Japan			League		Emperor's Cup		Total	
2012	Thespa Kusatsu	J2 League	27	0	0	0	27	0
2013	Thespa Kusatsu	J2 League	40	3	0	0	40	3
2014	Thespa Kusatsu	J2 League	39	0	3	0	42	0
2015	Thespa Kusatsu	J2 League	21	0	1	0	22	0
2016	Zweigen Kanazawa	J2 League	22	0	2	0	24	0
2017	Zweigen Kanazawa	J2 League	38	0	2	0	40	0
2018	Zweigen Kanazawa	J2 League	0	0	1	0	1	0
2018	Thespakusatsu	J3 League	15	1	–		15	1
2019	Ventforet Kofu	J2 League	29	1	4	1	33	2
2020	Ventforet Kofu	J2 League	32	2	–		32	2
2021	Ventforet Kofu	J2 League	18	0	1	0	19	0
2022	Blaublitz Akita	J2 League	27	0	0	0	27	0
2023	Blaublitz Akita	J2 League	0	0	0	0	0	0
Total			308	7	14	1	322	8
