= 2014 Zweigen Kanazawa season =

Zweigen Kanazawa
2014 season
- Manager: Hitoshi Morishita
- Stadium: Ishikawa Athletics Stadium
- J3 League: 1st

2014 Zweigen Kanazawa season.

== J3 League ==
| Match | Date | Team | Score | Team | Venue | Attendance |
|---|---|---|---|---|---|---|
| 1 | 2014.03.09 | SC Sagamihara | 0-4 | Zweigen Kanazawa | Sagamihara Gion Stadium | 2,873 |
| 2 | 2014.03.16 | Zweigen Kanazawa | 1-1 | Gainare Tottori | Ishikawa Athletics Stadium | 2,573 |
| 3 | 2014.03.23 | AC Nagano Parceiro | 2-1 | Zweigen Kanazawa | Saku Athletic Stadium | 3,073 |
| 4 | 2014.03.29 | Zweigen Kanazawa | 4-0 | YSCC Yokohama | Technoport Fukui Stadium | 658 |
| 6 | 2014.04.13 | FC Machida Zelvia | 0-0 | Zweigen Kanazawa | Machida Stadium | 2,968 |
| 5 | 2014.04.16 | Zweigen Kanazawa | 2-1 | FC Ryukyu | Ishikawa Athletics Stadium | 1,113 |
| 7 | 2014.04.20 | Zweigen Kanazawa | 1-0 | Blaublitz Akita | Ishikawa Athletics Stadium | 1,562 |
| 8 | 2014.04.26 | Zweigen Kanazawa | 2-0 | Grulla Morioka | Ishikawa Athletics Stadium | 1,514 |
| 9 | 2014.04.29 | Fukushima United FC | 0-1 | Zweigen Kanazawa | Toho Stadium | 928 |
| 10 | 2014.05.04 | Fujieda MYFC | 0-0 | Zweigen Kanazawa | Fujieda Soccer Stadium | 1,184 |
| 11 | 2014.05.11 | Zweigen Kanazawa | 2-0 | J.League U-22 Selection | Ishikawa Athletics Stadium | 3,309 |
| 12 | 2014.05.18 | FC Ryukyu | 1-0 | Zweigen Kanazawa | Okinawa City Stadium | 575 |
| 13 | 2014.05.24 | Zweigen Kanazawa | 0-1 | FC Machida Zelvia | Ishikawa Athletics Stadium | 2,516 |
| 14 | 2014.06.01 | Zweigen Kanazawa | 3-1 | Fujieda MYFC | Ishikawa Athletics Stadium | 8,115 |
| 15 | 2014.06.08 | Grulla Morioka | 0-1 | Zweigen Kanazawa | Morioka Minami Park Stadium | 1,078 |
| 16 | 2014.06.14 | Zweigen Kanazawa | 0-0 | J.League U-22 Selection | Ishikawa Athletics Stadium | 1,788 |
| 17 | 2014.06.21 | Zweigen Kanazawa | 2-1 | SC Sagamihara | Ishikawa Athletics Stadium | 3,023 |
| 18 | 2014.07.20 | YSCC Yokohama | 0-3 | Zweigen Kanazawa | NHK Spring Mitsuzawa Football Stadium | 842 |
| 19 | 2014.07.27 | Zweigen Kanazawa | 2-2 | Fukushima United FC | Ishikawa Athletics Stadium | 2,742 |
| 20 | 2014.08.03 | Gainare Tottori | 4-2 | Zweigen Kanazawa | Tottori Bank Bird Stadium | 5,892 |
| 21 | 2014.08.10 | AC Nagano Parceiro | 1-2 | Zweigen Kanazawa | Nagano Athletic Stadium | 3,038 |
| 22 | 2014.08.24 | Zweigen Kanazawa | 1-0 | Blaublitz Akita | Ishikawa Athletics Stadium | 6,851 |
| 23 | 2014.08.31 | Grulla Morioka | 0-2 | Zweigen Kanazawa | Morioka Minami Park Stadium | 1,526 |
| 24 | 2014.09.07 | Zweigen Kanazawa | 2-1 | Fukushima United FC | Ishikawa Athletics Stadium | 2,840 |
| 25 | 2014.09.14 | Zweigen Kanazawa | 3-2 | AC Nagano Parceiro | Ishikawa Athletics Stadium | 4,392 |
| 26 | 2014.09.20 | Blaublitz Akita | 1-2 | Zweigen Kanazawa | Akigin Stadium | 1,251 |
| 27 | 2014.10.04 | Zweigen Kanazawa | 2-1 | YSCC Yokohama | Ishikawa Athletics Stadium | 4,665 |
| 28 | 2014.10.12 | FC Machida Zelvia | 0-0 | Zweigen Kanazawa | Machida Stadium | 4,312 |
| 29 | 2014.10.19 | Zweigen Kanazawa | 2-0 | Fujieda MYFC | Ishikawa Athletics Stadium | 3,399 |
| 30 | 2014.11.02 | Gainare Tottori | 0-1 | Zweigen Kanazawa | Tottori Bank Bird Stadium | 2,306 |
| 31 | 2014.11.08 | Zweigen Kanazawa | 3-0 | J.League U-22 Selection | Ishikawa Athletics Stadium | 4,692 |
| 32 | 2014.11.16 | FC Ryukyu | 0-1 | Zweigen Kanazawa | Okinawa City Stadium | 1,562 |
| 33 | 2014.11.23 | Zweigen Kanazawa | 4-0 | SC Sagamihara | Ishikawa Athletics Stadium | 6,168 |
