= Shusuke Tsubouchi =

Japanese footballer (born 1983)

Shusuke Tsubouchi 坪内 秀介
Personal information
- Full name: Shusuke Tsubouchi
- Date of birth: May 5, 1983 (age 43)
- Place of birth: Takasaki, Gunma, Japan
- Height: 1.80 m (5 ft 11 in)
- Position: Defender

Youth career
- 1999–2001: Maebashi Ikuei High School

Senior career*
Years	Team	Apps	(Gls)
2002–2007	Vissel Kobe	100	(1)
2008	Consadole Sapporo	30	(0)
2009	Oita Trinita	20	(0)
2010–2012	Omiya Ardija	50	(2)
2012–2014	Albirex Niigata	15	(2)
2014–2015	Júbilo Iwata	15	(0)
2016–2018	Thespakusatsu Gunma	54	(2)
Total		284	(7)
Medal record
Representing Japan
AFC U-19 Championship
Silver medal – second place	2002 Qatar
- * Club domestic league appearances and goals

Shusuke Tsubouchi (坪内 秀介, Tsubouchi Shusuke; born May 5, 1983) is a former Japanese football player.

== Playing career ==
Tsubouchi was born in Takasaki on May 5, 1983. After graduating from high school, he joined J1 League club Vissel Kobe in 2002. He played many matches as left side back from 2003. However he could not play many matches in 2005 and Vissel was relegated to J2 League end of 2005 season. He became a regular player in 2006 and Vissel was returned to J1 in a year. However his opportunity to play decreased in 2007. In 2008, he moved to newly was promoted to J1 League club, Consadole Sapporo. Although he played as regular left side back, Consadole finished at the bottom place and was relegated to J2. In 2009, he moved to Oita Trinita. Although he played many matches as substitute defender, Trinita was relegated to J2. In 2010, he moved to Omiya Ardija. He played many matches as side back and center back. However his opportunity to play decreased in 2012. In August 2012, he moved to Albirex Niigata. However he could not play many matches. In August 2014, he moved to J2 club Júbilo Iwata. However he could not play many matches. In 2016, he moved to his local club Thespakusatsu Gunma in J2. Although he played many matches in 2016, he could not play many matches in 2017 and Thespakusatsu was relegated to J3 League end of 2017 season. He retired end of 2018 season.

== Club statistics ==
Updated to 15 December 2018.

Club performance			League		Emperor's Cup		J.League Cup		Total	
Season	Club	League	Apps	Goals	Apps	Goals	Apps	Goals	Apps	Goals
2002	Vissel Kobe	J1 League	1	0	0	0	0	0	1	0
2003	Vissel Kobe	J1 League	10	0	1	0	4	0	15	0
2004	Vissel Kobe	J1 League	21	0	0	0	2	0	23	0
2005	Vissel Kobe	J1 League	9	0	1	0	1	0	11	0
2006	Vissel Kobe	J2 League	46	1	0	0	-		46	1
2007	Vissel Kobe	J1 League	13	0	1	0	5	0	19	0
Total			100	1	3	0	12	0	115	1
2008	Consadole Sapporo	J1 League	30	0	0	0	6	0	36	0
Total			30	0	0	0	6	0	36	0
2009	Oita Trinita	J1 League	20	0	1	0	5	0	26	0
Total			20	0	1	0	5	0	26	0
2010	Omiya Ardija	J1 League	26	2	2	0	3	0	31	2
2011	Omiya Ardija	J1 League	19	0	0	0	1	0	20	0
2012	Omiya Ardija	J1 League	5	0	0	0	1	0	6	0
Total			50	2	2	0	5	0	57	2
2012	Albirex Niigata	J1 League	9	2	2	0	0	0	11	2
2013	Albirex Niigata	J1 League	6	0	1	0	4	0	11	0
2014	Albirex Niigata	J1 League	0	0	0	0	2	0	2	0
Total			15	2	3	0	6	0	24	2
2014	Júbilo Iwata	J2 League	8	0	0	0	-		8	0
2015	Júbilo Iwata	J2 League	7	0	2	0	-		9	0
Total			15	0	2	0	-		17	0
2016	Thespakusatsu Gunma	J2 League	34	2	2	0	-		36	2
2017	Thespakusatsu Gunma	J2 League	8	0	1	0	-		9	0
2018	Thespakusatsu Gunma	J3 League	12	0	2	0	-		14	0
Total			54	2	5	0	-		59	2
Career total			284	7	16	0	34	0	334	7
