= Kenta Shimizu =

Japanese footballer (born 1981)

Kenta Shimizu 清水 健太
Personal information
- Full name: Kenta Shimizu
- Date of birth: September 18, 1981 (age 45)
- Place of birth: Matsudo, Chiba, Japan
- Height: 1.84 m (6 ft 1/2 in)
- Position: Goalkeeper

Team information
- Current team: Kamatamare Sanuki
- Number: 1

Youth career
- 1997–1999: Matsudo High School

Senior career*
Years	Team	Apps	(Gls)
2000–2005	Kashiwa Reysol	5	(0)
2005–2014	Montedio Yamagata	287	(0)
2015–	Kamatamare Sanuki	196	(0)
Total		454	(0)
Medal record
Montedio Yamagata
Runner-up	Emperor's Cup	2014
- * Club domestic league appearances and goals as of 1 January 2020

Kenta Shimizu (清水 健太, Shimizu Kenta; born September 18, 1981) is a Japanese football player who plays for Kamatamare Sanuki.

== Playing career ==
Shimizu was born in Matsudo on September 18, 1981. After graduating from high school, he joined J1 League club Kashiwa Reysol based in his local Chiba Prefecture in 2000. Although he debuted in 2003 and several matches until April 2005, he could hardly play in the match behind Yuta Minami.

In April 2005, Shimizu moved to J2 League club Montedio Yamagata. Although he could not play at all in the match behind Shigeru Sakurai until October, he played last 5 matches in 2005 season. In 2006, he became a regular goalkeeper instead Sakurai. In 2008, Montedio won the 2nd place and was promoted to J1 first time in the club history. He played as regular goalkeeper and Montedio also remained in J1 until 2010. In 2011, however he lost his position behind Yuki Uekusa and the club results were bad. Although Shimizu became a regular goalkeeper again in July, Montedio finished at the bottom place and was relegated to J2 end of 2011 season. Although Shimizu played all 42 matches in 2012, he could not play many matches behind new player Satoshi Tokizawa in 2013 and Norihiro Yamagishi in 2014. Montedio was promoted to J1 end of 2014 season and won the 2nd place in 2014 Emperor's Cup.

In 2015, Shimizu moved to J2 club Kamatamare Sanuki. He became a regular goalkeeper. However the club results were bad every season and was relegated to J3 League end of 2018 season.

== Club statistics ==
As of 1 January 2020

Club performance			League		Cup		League Cup		Total	
Season	Club	League	Apps	Goals	Apps	Goals	Apps	Goals	Apps	Goals
Japan			League		Emperor's Cup		J.League Cup		Total	
2000	Kashiwa Reysol	J1 League	0	0	0	0	0	0	0	0
2001	Kashiwa Reysol	J1 League	0	0	0	0	0	0	0	0
2002	Kashiwa Reysol	J1 League	0	0	0	0	0	0	0	0
2003	Kashiwa Reysol	J1 League	3	0	2	0	1	0	6	0
2004	Kashiwa Reysol	J1 League	2	0	0	0	1	0	3	0
2005	Kashiwa Reysol	J1 League	0	0	0	0	0	0	0	0
Total			5	0	2	0	2	0	9	0
2005	Montedio Yamagata	J2 League	5	0	1	0	-		6	0
2006	Montedio Yamagata	J2 League	43	0	1	0	-		44	0
2007	Montedio Yamagata	J2 League	48	0	1	0	-		49	0
2008	Montedio Yamagata	J2 League	42	0	1	0	-		43	0
2009	Montedio Yamagata	J1 League	34	0	0	0	4	0	38	0
2010	Montedio Yamagata	J1 League	32	0	3	0	0	0	35	0
2011	Montedio Yamagata	J1 League	18	0	0	0	1	0	19	0
2012	Montedio Yamagata	J2 League	42	0	1	0	-		43	0
2013	Montedio Yamagata	J2 League	7	0	0	0	-		7	0
2014	Montedio Yamagata	J2 League	16	0	0	0	-		16	0
Total			287	0	8	0	5	0	300	0
2015	Kamatamare Sanuki	J2 League	42	0	1	0	-		43	0
2016	Kamatamare Sanuki	J2 League	42	0	1	0	-		43	0
2017	Kamatamare Sanuki	J2 League	37	0	0	0	-		37	0
2018	Kamatamare Sanuki	J2 League	41	0	0	0	-		41	0
2019	Kamatamare Sanuki	J3 League	34	0	0	0	-		34	0
Total			196	0	2	0	-		198	0
Career total			488	0	12	0	7	0	511	0
