= Hitoshi Morishita =

Hitoshi Morishita may refer to:

- Hitoshi Morishita (footballer, born 1967) (森下 仁之) (1967–2025), Japanese footballer and manager
- Hitoshi Morishita (footballer, born 1972) (森下 仁志), Japanese footballer
