= Tsubouchi =

Tsubouchi (written: 坪内) is a Japanese surname. Notable people with the surname include:

- David Tsubouchi (坪内 デビト, born c. 1952), Canadian politician
- Shusuke Tsubouchi (坪内 秀介, born 1983), Japanese footballer
- Tsubouchi Shōyō (坪内 逍遥, 1859–1935), Japanese writer
