= 2016 Cerezo Osaka season =

Cerezo Osaka
2016 season
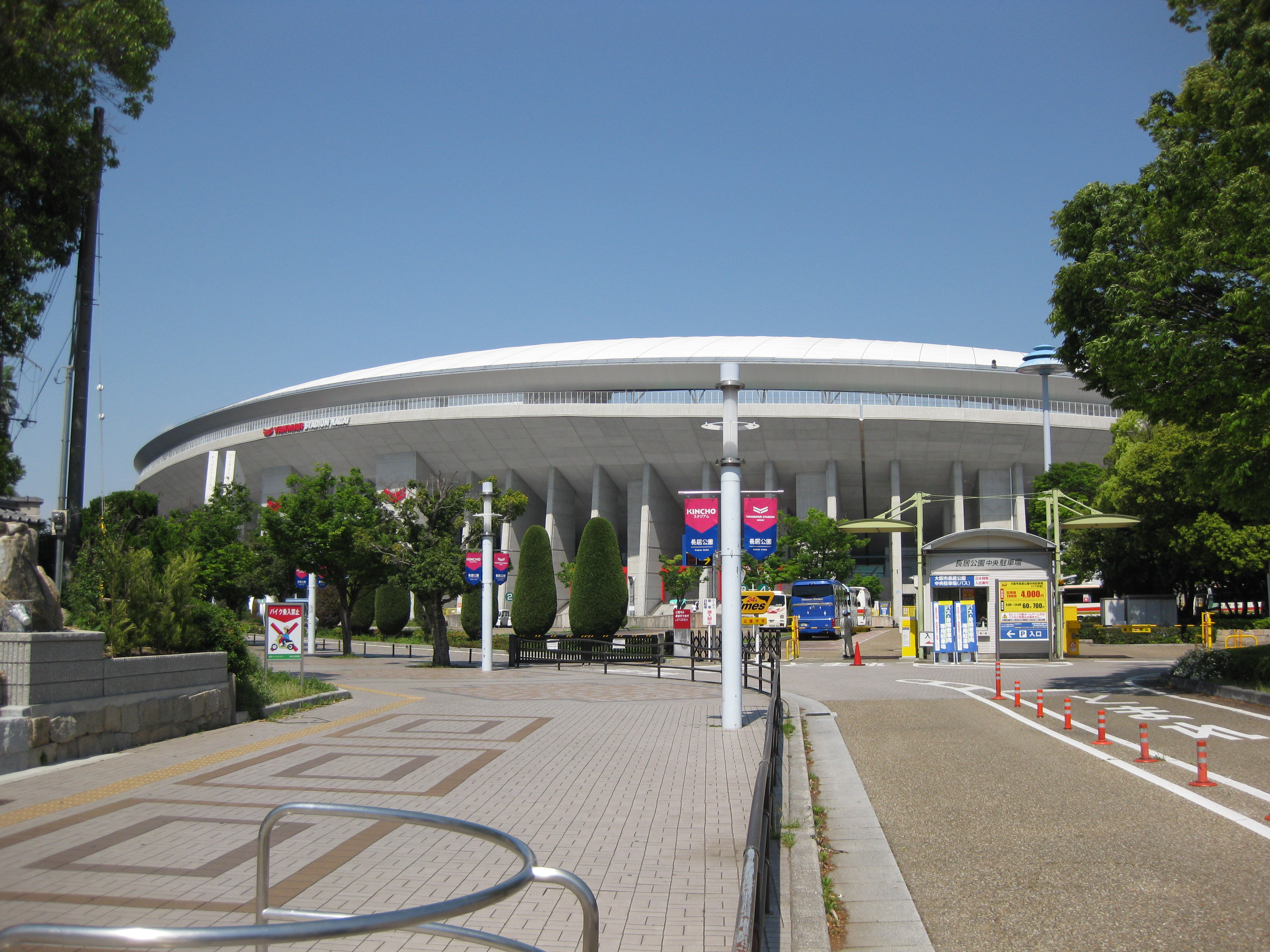
- Manager: Kiyoshi Okuma
- Stadium: Yanmar Stadium Nagai
- J2 League: 4th
Home colours	Away colours

2016 Cerezo Osaka season.

== Squad ==
As of 19 February 2016. Note: Flags indicate national team as defined under FIFA eligibility rules; some limited exceptions apply. Players may hold more than one non-FIFA nationality.

No.	Pos.	Nation	Player
1	GK	JPN	Hiroyuki Takeda
2	MF	JPN	Takahiro Ogihara
3	DF	JPN	Teruyuki Moniwa
4	DF	JPN	Kota Fujimoto
5	DF	JPN	Yusuke Tanaka
6	MF	BRA	Souza
7	MF	JPN	Kunimitsu Sekiguchi
8	FW	JPN	Yoichiro Kakitani (captain)
9	FW	JPN	Kenyu Sugimoto
10	FW	BRA	Bruno Meneghel
11	FW	BRA	Ricardo Santos
13	MF	JPN	Mitsuru Maruoka
14	DF	JPN	Yusuke Maruhashi
15	DF	JPN	Riku Matsuda
16	DF	JPN	Yuki Kotani
17	MF	JPN	Noriyuki Sakemoto
18	MF	JPN	Shohei Kiyohara
19	FW	JPN	Yuzo Tashiro
20	FW	JPN	Keiji Tamada
21	GK	KOR	Kim Jin-Hyeon

No.	Pos.	Nation	Player
22	DF	JPN	Sota Nakazawa
23	DF	JPN	Tatsuya Yamashita
24	MF	JPN	Kazuya Yamamura
25	MF	JPN	Daiki Kogure
26	MF	JPN	Daichi Akiyama
27	GK	JPN	Kenta Tanno
28	DF	JPN	Hayato Nukui
29	FW	JPN	Ryuji Sawakami
30	MF	JPN	Yasuki Kimoto
31	MF	JPN	Hideo Hashimoto
32	GK	KOR	Ahn Joon-Soo
33	DF	JPN	Kenta Mukuhara
34	MF	JPN	Masaki Sakamoto
35	MF	JPN	Masaki Okino
36	FW	JPN	Rei Yonezawa
37	DF	JPN	Jurato Ikeda
38	MF	JPN	Masataka Nishimoto
39	DF	JPN	Shoji Honoya
40	FW	JPN	Takeru Kishimoto
45	GK	JPN	Takashi Kitano

== Senior ==
=== J2 League ===
Match	Date	Team	Score	Team	Venue	Attendance
1	2016.02.28	FC Machida Zelvia	0–1	Cerezo Osaka	Machida Stadium	10,112
2	2016.03.06	Mito HollyHock	0–1	Cerezo Osaka	K's denki Stadium Mito	10,420
3	2016.03.12	Cerezo Osaka	1–0	Thespakusatsu Gunma	Kincho Stadium	13,495
4	2016.03.20	Montedio Yamagata	0–1	Cerezo Osaka	ND Soft Stadium Yamagata	12,603
5	2016.03.26	Cerezo Osaka	2–2	Zweigen Kanazawa	Kincho Stadium	11,482
6	2016.04.03	Cerezo Osaka	2–1	JEF United Chiba	Kincho Stadium	10,719
7	2016.04.09	Shimizu S-Pulse	0–2	Cerezo Osaka	IAI Stadium Nihondaira	15,083
8	2016.04.17	Cerezo Osaka	1–1	Giravanz Kitakyushu	Yanmar Stadium Nagai	18,809
9	2016.04.23	Hokkaido Consadole Sapporo	1–0	Cerezo Osaka	Sapporo Dome	21,640
10	2016.04.29	Cerezo Osaka	0–2	Kyoto Sanga FC	Kincho Stadium	14,883
11	2016.05.03	Matsumoto Yamaga FC	0–1	Cerezo Osaka	Matsumotodaira Park Stadium	17,302
12	2016.05.07	Ehime FC	0–0	Cerezo Osaka	Ningineer Stadium	7,740
13	2016.05.15	Cerezo Osaka	2–4	Renofa Yamaguchi FC	Kincho Stadium	10,857
14	2016.05.22	Yokohama FC	1–1	Cerezo Osaka	NHK Spring Mitsuzawa Football Stadium	10,524
15	2016.05.28	Cerezo Osaka	2–1	Fagiano Okayama	Yanmar Stadium Nagai	13,774
16	2016.06.04	Cerezo Osaka	2–3	Kamatamare Sanuki	Yanmar Stadium Nagai	18,002
17	2016.06.08	V-Varen Nagasaki	1–2	Cerezo Osaka	Nagasaki Stadium	5,388
18	2016.06.12	FC Gifu	0–1	Cerezo Osaka	Gifu Nagaragawa Stadium	8,087
19	2016.06.19	Cerezo Osaka	3–2	Tokushima Vortis	Kincho Stadium	8,464
20	2016.06.26	Cerezo Osaka	1–0	Tokyo Verdy	Kincho Stadium	10,171
21	2016.07.03	Roasso Kumamoto	1–5	Cerezo Osaka	Umakana-Yokana Stadium	9,322
22	2016.07.09	Cerezo Osaka	0–0	Hokkaido Consadole Sapporo	Kincho Stadium	13,443
23	2016.07.16	Thespakusatsu Gunma	0–2	Cerezo Osaka	Shoda Shoyu Stadium Gunma	6,986
24	2016.07.20	Cerezo Osaka	1–3	FC Machida Zelvia	Kincho Stadium	9,323
25	2016.07.24	Kamatamare Sanuki	2–1	Cerezo Osaka	Pikara Stadium	11,376
26	2016.07.31	Kyoto Sanga FC	3–3	Cerezo Osaka	Kyoto Nishikyogoku Athletic Stadium	12,042
27	2016.08.07	Cerezo Osaka	2–3	Yokohama FC	Kincho Stadium	13,246
28	2016.08.11	Renofa Yamaguchi FC	0–2	Cerezo Osaka	Ishin Memorial Park Stadium	14,532
29	2016.08.14	Cerezo Osaka	0–1	Matsumoto Yamaga FC	Kincho Stadium	13,593
30	2016.08.21	Zweigen Kanazawa	1–3	Cerezo Osaka	Ishikawa Athletics Stadium	9,316
31	2016.09.11	Cerezo Osaka	2–0	V-Varen Nagasaki	Kincho Stadium	9,622
32	2016.09.18	Giravanz Kitakyushu	0–1	Cerezo Osaka	Honjo Stadium	2,434
33	2016.09.25	Tokushima Vortis	0–1	Cerezo Osaka	Pocarisweat Stadium	7,657
34	2016.10.02	Cerezo Osaka	1–2	Shimizu S-Pulse	Yanmar Stadium Nagai	23,781
35	2016.10.08	Cerezo Osaka	3–2	FC Gifu	Kincho Stadium	9,391
36	2016.10.16	Fagiano Okayama	1–1	Cerezo Osaka	City Light Stadium	15,203
37	2016.10.23	Cerezo Osaka	2–2	Montedio Yamagata	Kincho Stadium	10,025
38	2016.10.30	Cerezo Osaka	2–2	Mito HollyHock	Kincho Stadium	9,445
39	2016.11.03	JEF United Chiba	3–0	Cerezo Osaka	Fukuda Denshi Arena	10,948
40	2016.11.06	Cerezo Osaka	1–0	Ehime FC	Kincho Stadium	8,714
41	2016.11.12	Tokyo Verdy	1–2	Cerezo Osaka	Ajinomoto Stadium	8,340
42	2016.11.20	Cerezo Osaka	1–0	Roasso Kumamoto	Kincho Stadium	11,452

== Under 23 ==
=== J3 League ===
Match	Date	Team	Score	Team	Venue	Attendance
1	2016.03.13	Cerezo Osaka U-23	2–0	Grulla Morioka	Kincho Stadium	1,869
2	2016.03.20	Fujieda MYFC	1–0	Cerezo Osaka U-23	Fujieda Soccer Stadium	1,620
3	2016.04.02	Cerezo Osaka U-23	2–1	FC Ryukyu	Kincho Stadium	1,408
4	2016.04.10	Gamba Osaka U-23	2–1	Cerezo Osaka U-23	Suita City Football Stadium	8,038
5	2016.04.16	Cerezo Osaka U-23	0–0	AC Nagano Parceiro	Yanmar Stadium Nagai	1,594
6	2016.04.24	SC Sagamihara	3–1	Cerezo Osaka U-23	Sagamihara Gion Stadium	3,369
7	2016.05.01	Cerezo Osaka U-23	1–1	YSCC Yokohama	Kincho Stadium	1,602
8	2016.05.08	Fukushima United FC	2–2	Cerezo Osaka U-23	Toho Stadium	2,232
9	2016.05.15	Kagoshima United FC	3–1	Cerezo Osaka U-23	Kagoshima Kamoike Stadium	3,494
10	2016.05.22	Cerezo Osaka U-23	2–1	Oita Trinita	Kincho Stadium	1,685
11	2016.05.29	Tochigi SC	1–0	Cerezo Osaka U-23	Tochigi Green Stadium	4,112
12	2016.06.12	Kataller Toyama	2–1	Cerezo Osaka U-23	Toyama Stadium	3,175
13	2016.06.18	Cerezo Osaka U-23	2–1	FC Tokyo U-23	Kincho Stadium	1,337
14	2016.06.25	Cerezo Osaka U-23	2–2	Gainare Tottori	Kincho Stadium	1,221
15	2016.07.03	Blaublitz Akita	1–1	Cerezo Osaka U-23	Akigin Stadium	2,251
16	2016.07.10	Cerezo Osaka U-23	1–2	Gamba Osaka U-23	Kincho Stadium	4,915
17	2016.07.16	Grulla Morioka	1–0	Cerezo Osaka U-23	Iwagin Stadium	778
18	2016.07.24	Cerezo Osaka U-23	2–2	SC Sagamihara	Kincho Stadium	894
19	2016.07.31	FC Ryukyu	0–3	Cerezo Osaka U-23	Okinawa Athletic Park Stadium	4,565
20	2016.08.06	Cerezo Osaka U-23	0–2	Kagoshima United FC	Kincho Stadium	1,085
21	2016.09.10	Cerezo Osaka U-23	0–3	Tochigi SC	Kincho Stadium	1,119
22	2016.09.19	Oita Trinita	2–0	Cerezo Osaka U-23	Oita Bank Dome	8,256
23	2016.09.25	AC Nagano Parceiro	1–3	Cerezo Osaka U-23	Minami Nagano Sports Park Stadium	3,936
24	2016.10.01	Cerezo Osaka U-23	2–1	Fujieda MYFC	Yanmar Stadium Nagai	748
25	2016.10.16	Gainare Tottori	1–2	Cerezo Osaka U-23	Tottori Bank Bird Stadium	2,064
26	2016.10.22	Cerezo Osaka U-23	1–2	Blaublitz Akita	Kincho Stadium	771
27	2016.10.29	Cerezo Osaka U-23	2–2	Fukushima United FC	Kincho Stadium	713
28	2016.11.06	YSCC Yokohama	2–2	Cerezo Osaka U-23	NHK Spring Mitsuzawa Football Stadium	800
29	2016.11.13	Cerezo Osaka U-23	2–3	Kataller Toyama	Kincho Stadium	1,365
30	2016.11.20	FC Tokyo U-23	2–0	Cerezo Osaka U-23	Yumenoshima Stadium	2,877
