= 2018 Zweigen Kanazawa season =

Zweigen Kanazawa
2018 season
- Manager: Masaaki Yanagishita
- Stadium: Ishikawa Athletics Stadium
- J2 League: 13th

2018 Zweigen Kanazawa season.

== J2 League ==
Match	Date	Team	Score	Team	Venue	Attendance
1	2018.02.25	Ehime FC	1-2	Zweigen Kanazawa	Ningineer Stadium	3,439
2	2018.03.04	Zweigen Kanazawa	0-1	Kamatamare Sanuki	Ishikawa Athletics Stadium	4,804
3	2018.03.11	Zweigen Kanazawa	0-1	Avispa Fukuoka	Ishikawa Athletics Stadium	3,032
4	2018.03.17	Omiya Ardija	1-1	Zweigen Kanazawa	NACK5 Stadium Omiya	7,298
5	2018.03.21	Renofa Yamaguchi FC	2-2	Zweigen Kanazawa	Ishin Me-Life Stadium	3,508
6	2018.03.25	Zweigen Kanazawa	1-1	FC Machida Zelvia	Ishikawa Athletics Stadium	3,239
7	2018.04.01	Yokohama FC	0-4	Zweigen Kanazawa	NHK Spring Mitsuzawa Football Stadium	3,571
8	2018.04.08	Zweigen Kanazawa	3-1	JEF United Chiba	Ishikawa Athletics Stadium	3,028
9	2018.04.15	Mito HollyHock	1-0	Zweigen Kanazawa	K's denki Stadium Mito	2,736
10	2018.04.22	Zweigen Kanazawa	0-1	Oita Trinita	Ishikawa Athletics Stadium	4,131
11	2018.04.28	FC Gifu	0-1	Zweigen Kanazawa	Gifu Nagaragawa Stadium	5,932
12	2018.05.03	Zweigen Kanazawa	2-3	Albirex Niigata	Ishikawa Athletics Stadium	9,497
13	2018.05.06	Tokyo Verdy	0-1	Zweigen Kanazawa	Ajinomoto Stadium	5,587
14	2018.05.12	Matsumoto Yamaga FC	5-0	Zweigen Kanazawa	Matsumotodaira Park Stadium	11,333
15	2018.05.20	Zweigen Kanazawa	0-0	Tokushima Vortis	Ishikawa Athletics Stadium	4,004
16	2018.05.27	Montedio Yamagata	2-1	Zweigen Kanazawa	ND Soft Stadium Yamagata	5,298
17	2018.06.02	Zweigen Kanazawa	1-3	Kyoto Sanga FC	Ishikawa Athletics Stadium	5,473
19	2018.06.16	Zweigen Kanazawa	2-0	Tochigi SC	Ishikawa Athletics Stadium	5,512
20	2018.06.23	Zweigen Kanazawa	0-0	Roasso Kumamoto	Ishikawa Athletics Stadium	4,290
21	2018.07.01	Fagiano Okayama	3-3	Zweigen Kanazawa	City Light Stadium	7,070
18	2018.07.04	Ventforet Kofu	1-3	Zweigen Kanazawa	Yamanashi Chuo Bank Stadium	3,782
22	2018.07.07	Zweigen Kanazawa	2-2	Renofa Yamaguchi FC	Ishikawa Athletics Stadium	2,108
23	2018.07.15	JEF United Chiba	3-4	Zweigen Kanazawa	Fukuda Denshi Arena	10,003
24	2018.07.21	FC Machida Zelvia	1-0	Zweigen Kanazawa	Machida Stadium	7,214
25	2018.07.25	Zweigen Kanazawa	0-0	Yokohama FC	Ishikawa Athletics Stadium	5,445
26	2018.07.29	Tochigi SC	1-1	Zweigen Kanazawa	Tochigi Green Stadium	3,794
27	2018.08.05	Roasso Kumamoto	0-1	Zweigen Kanazawa	Egao Kenko Stadium	3,894
28	2018.08.11	Zweigen Kanazawa	1-2	Ventforet Kofu	Ishikawa Athletics Stadium	4,598
29	2018.08.18	Zweigen Kanazawa	0-1	Fagiano Okayama	Ishikawa Athletics Stadium	3,573
30	2018.08.25	Kamatamare Sanuki	0-2	Zweigen Kanazawa	Pikara Stadium	2,349
31	2018.09.01	Zweigen Kanazawa	0-1	Tokyo Verdy	Ishikawa Athletics Stadium	3,832
32	2018.09.08	Kyoto Sanga FC	0-0	Zweigen Kanazawa	Kyoto Nishikyogoku Athletic Stadium	4,550
33	2018.09.15	Albirex Niigata	2-1	Zweigen Kanazawa	Denka Big Swan Stadium	15,011
34	2018.09.24	Zweigen Kanazawa	1-0	Montedio Yamagata	Ishikawa Athletics Stadium	3,783
35	2018.09.30	Zweigen Kanazawa	2-0	FC Gifu	Ishikawa Athletics Stadium	2,301
36	2018.10.07	Tokushima Vortis	0-3	Zweigen Kanazawa	Pocarisweat Stadium	4,897
37	2018.10.14	Zweigen Kanazawa	0-2	Matsumoto Yamaga FC	Ishikawa Athletics Stadium	9,645
38	2018.10.19	Zweigen Kanazawa	0-0	Ehime FC	Ishikawa Athletics Stadium	2,512
39	2018.10.28	Avispa Fukuoka	2-2	Zweigen Kanazawa	Level5 Stadium	13,008
40	2018.11.04	Zweigen Kanazawa	1-1	Omiya Ardija	Ishikawa Athletics Stadium	5,807
41	2018.11.10	Oita Trinita	2-1	Zweigen Kanazawa	Oita Bank Dome	14,069
42	2018.11.17	Zweigen Kanazawa	3-1	Mito HollyHock	Ishikawa Athletics Stadium	4,479
