= Sota Nakazawa =

Japanese footballer

Sota Nakazawa 中澤 聡太
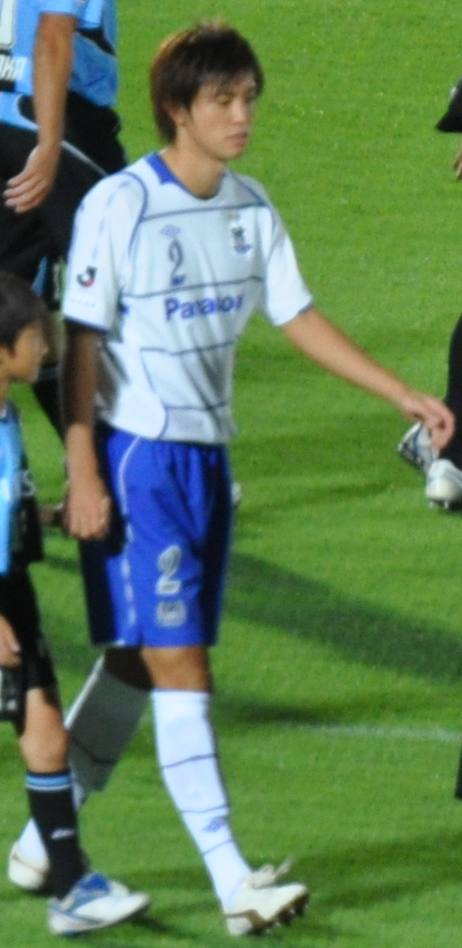
- Nakazawa with Gamba Osaka in 2010

Personal information
- Full name: Sota Nakazawa
- Date of birth: 26 October 1982 (age 44)
- Place of birth: Mitaka, Tokyo, Japan
- Height: 1.88 m (6 ft 2 in)
- Position: Defender

Youth career
- 1998–2000: Funabashi High School

Senior career*
Years	Team	Apps	(Gls)
2001–2006	Kashiwa Reysol	29	(0)
2006	FC Tokyo	2	(0)
2007–2012	Gamba Osaka	136	(14)
2013–2014	Kawasaki Frontale	30	(1)
2015–2016	Cerezo Osaka	12	(0)
Total		209	(15)

International career
2001	Japan U-20	3	(0)
Medal record
Gamba Osaka
Winner	AFC Champions League	2008
Runner-up	J1 League	2010
Winner	J.League Cup	2007
Winner	Emperor's Cup	2008
Winner	Emperor's Cup	2009
Runner-up	Emperor's Cup	2012
Representing Japan
AFC U-19 Championship
Silver medal – second place	2000 Iran
- * Club domestic league appearances and goals

Sota Nakazawa (中澤 聡太, Nakazawa Sōta; born 26 October 1982) is a former Japanese football player.

== Club career ==
Nakazawa was born in Mitaka on 26 October 1982. After graduating from high school, he joined Kashiwa Reysol in 2001. However he could hardly play in the match. He moved to FC Tokyo in June 2006. He moved to Gamba Osaka in 2007. He became a regular player from 2008. In 2008, the club won the champions AFC Champions League and the 3rd place Club World Cup. The club also won 2008 and 2009 Emperor's Cup. In late 2012, he could not play for injury and the club was relegated to J2 League. He moved to Kawasaki Frontale in 2013 and Cerezo Osaka in 2015. However his opportunity to play decreased and he retired end of 2016 season.

== National team career ==
In June 2001, Nakazawa was selected Japan U-20 national team for 2001 World Youth Championship. At this tournament, he played all three matches.

== Club statistics ==
Club performance			League		Cup		League Cup		Continental		Total	
Season	Club	League	Apps	Goals	Apps	Goals	Apps	Goals	Apps	Goals	Apps	Goals
Japan			League		Emperor's Cup		J.League Cup		AFC		Total	
2001	Kashiwa Reysol	J1 League	1	0	0	0	0	0	-		1	0
2002	Kashiwa Reysol	J1 League	1	0	0	0	0	0	-		1	0
2003	Kashiwa Reysol	J1 League	0	0	0	0	1	0	-		1	0
2004	Kashiwa Reysol	J1 League	9	0	1	0	6	0	-		16	0
2005	Kashiwa Reysol	J1 League	16	0	0	0	6	1	-		22	1
2006	Kashiwa Reysol	J2 League	2	0	0	0	-		-		2	0
2006	FC Tokyo	J1 League	2	0	0	0	0	0	-		2	0
2007	Gamba Osaka	J1 League	2	0	1	0	5	0	-		8	0
2008	Gamba Osaka	J1 League	30	3	5	1	4	0	11	0	50	4
2009	Gamba Osaka	J1 League	26	0	5	0	2	1	6	0	39	1
2010	Gamba Osaka	J1 League	32	4	4	0	2	0	6	1	44	5
2011	Gamba Osaka	J1 League	27	5	1	0	2	0	5	2	35	7
2012	Gamba Osaka	J1 League	19	2	3	0	0	0	6	0	28	2
2013	Kawasaki Frontale	J1 League	20	1	3	0	7	0	-		30	1
2014	Kawasaki Frontale	J1 League	10	0	0	0	2	0	6	0	18	0
2015	Cerezo Osaka	J2 League	9	0	1	0	–		–		10	0
2016	Cerezo Osaka	J2 League	3	0	0	0	–		–		3	0
Career total			209	15	24	1	37	2	40	3	310	21

=== Club World Cup statistics ===
Season	Team	Apps	Goals
2008	Gamba Osaka	3	0

== Team honors ==
- AFC Champions League – 2008
- Pan-Pacific Championship – 2008
- Emperor's Cup – 2008, 2009
- J.League Cup – 2007
- Japanese Super Cup – 2007

== Youth National Team career ==
- AFC Youth Championship : 2000
- FIFA World Youth Championship : 2001
