= 2017 Zweigen Kanazawa season =

Zweigen Kanazawa
2017 season
- Manager: Masaaki Yanagishita
- Stadium: Ishikawa Athletics Stadium
- J2 League: 17th

2017 Zweigen Kanazawa season.

== J2 League ==
=== League table ===
Pos	Team	Pld	W	D	L	GF	GA	GD	Pts
16	Machida Zelvia	42	11	17	14	53	53	0	50
17	Zweigen Kanazawa	42	13	10	19	49	67	−18	49
18	FC Gifu	42	11	13	18	56	68	−12	46

Updated to match(es) played on 28 November 2017. Source: 2017 MEIJI YASUDA J2 LEAGUE League table
Rules for classification: 1) Points; 2) Goal difference; 3) Goals scored

=== Match details ===
J2 League match details
Match	Date	Team	Score	Team	Venue	Attendance
1	2017.02.26	Ehime FC	1-0	Zweigen Kanazawa	Ningineer Stadium	5,715
2	2017.03.04	Mito HollyHock	4-0	Zweigen Kanazawa	K's denki Stadium Mito	4,040
3	2017.03.12	Zweigen Kanazawa	0-0	Shonan Bellmare	Ishikawa Athletics Stadium	5,241
4	2017.03.18	V-Varen Nagasaki	2-1	Zweigen Kanazawa	Transcosmos Stadium Nagasaki	3,193
5	2017.03.26	Zweigen Kanazawa	2-2	FC Machida Zelvia	Ishikawa Athletics Stadium	2,830
6	2017.04.02	Zweigen Kanazawa	2-0	Thespakusatsu Gunma	Ishikawa Athletics Stadium	3,480
7	2017.04.08	Fagiano Okayama	0-1	Zweigen Kanazawa	City Light Stadium	6,275
8	2017.04.15	Oita Trinita	1-0	Zweigen Kanazawa	Oita Bank Dome	6,136
9	2017.04.23	Zweigen Kanazawa	0-2	Roasso Kumamoto	Ishikawa Athletics Stadium	3,322
10	2017.04.29	FC Gifu	1-0	Zweigen Kanazawa	Gifu Nagaragawa Stadium	7,066
11	2017.05.03	Tokyo Verdy	2-1	Zweigen Kanazawa	Ajinomoto Field Nishigaoka	4,112
12	2017.05.07	Zweigen Kanazawa	2-1	JEF United Chiba	Ishikawa Athletics Stadium	4,490
13	2017.05.13	Zweigen Kanazawa	1-1	Montedio Yamagata	Ishikawa Athletics Stadium	2,780
14	2017.05.17	Tokushima Vortis	1-1	Zweigen Kanazawa	Pocarisweat Stadium	3,106
15	2017.05.21	Zweigen Kanazawa	0-5	Avispa Fukuoka	Ishikawa Athletics Stadium	3,454
16	2017.05.28	Zweigen Kanazawa	0-4	Matsumoto Yamaga FC	Ishikawa Athletics Stadium	5,892
17	2017.06.03	Nagoya Grampus	2-3	Zweigen Kanazawa	Toyota Stadium	14,746
18	2017.06.11	Kamatamare Sanuki	1-0	Zweigen Kanazawa	Pikara Stadium	2,727
19	2017.06.17	Zweigen Kanazawa	3-2	Renofa Yamaguchi FC	Ishikawa Athletics Stadium	4,283
20	2017.06.25	Kyoto Sanga FC	1-3	Zweigen Kanazawa	Kyoto Nishikyogoku Athletic Stadium	4,410
21	2017.07.01	Zweigen Kanazawa	3-2	Yokohama FC	Ishikawa Athletics Stadium	8,544
22	2017.07.08	Avispa Fukuoka	0-2	Zweigen Kanazawa	Level5 Stadium	7,005
23	2017.07.15	Zweigen Kanazawa	1-2	Fagiano Okayama	Ishikawa Athletics Stadium	4,293
24	2017.07.22	JEF United Chiba	2-0	Zweigen Kanazawa	Fukuda Denshi Arena	9,799
25	2017.07.29	Matsumoto Yamaga FC	4-0	Zweigen Kanazawa	Matsumotodaira Park Stadium	11,001
26	2017.08.05	Zweigen Kanazawa	0-0	Tokyo Verdy	Ishikawa Athletics Stadium	4,046
27	2017.08.11	Montedio Yamagata	2-1	Zweigen Kanazawa	ND Soft Stadium Yamagata	12,743
28	2017.08.16	Zweigen Kanazawa	0-4	Tokushima Vortis	Ishikawa Athletics Stadium	3,727
29	2017.08.20	Thespakusatsu Gunma	1-1	Zweigen Kanazawa	Shoda Shoyu Stadium Gunma	2,509
30	2017.08.26	Zweigen Kanazawa	1-2	Kamatamare Sanuki	Ishikawa Athletics Stadium	3,029
31	2017.09.02	Zweigen Kanazawa	1-2	V-Varen Nagasaki	Ishikawa Athletics Stadium	3,000
32	2017.09.09	Yokohama FC	2-0	Zweigen Kanazawa	NHK Spring Mitsuzawa Football Stadium	7,960
33	2017.09.17	Zweigen Kanazawa	3-1	Nagoya Grampus	Ishikawa Athletics Stadium	11,173
34	2017.09.24	Zweigen Kanazawa	1-1	Oita Trinita	Ishikawa Athletics Stadium	4,193
35	2017.09.30	Shonan Bellmare	4-2	Zweigen Kanazawa	Shonan BMW Stadium Hiratsuka	6,904
36	2017.10.07	Zweigen Kanazawa	4-1	Ehime FC	Ishikawa Athletics Stadium	3,157
37	2017.10.15	FC Machida Zelvia	1-1	Zweigen Kanazawa	Machida Stadium	2,587
38	2017.10.22	Zweigen Kanazawa	0-0	Kyoto Sanga FC	Ishikawa Athletics Stadium	2,701
39	2017.10.29	Renofa Yamaguchi FC	0-1	Zweigen Kanazawa	Ishin Memorial Park Stadium	4,823
40	2017.11.05	Zweigen Kanazawa	1-1	FC Gifu	Ishikawa Athletics Stadium	5,567
41	2017.11.11	Roasso Kumamoto	1-4	Zweigen Kanazawa	Egao Kenko Stadium	9,584
42	2017.11.19	Zweigen Kanazawa	2-1	Mito HollyHock	Ishikawa Athletics Stadium	3,134
