= 2015 Zweigen Kanazawa season =

Zweigen Kanazawa
2015 season
- Manager: Hitoshi Morishita
- Stadium: Ishikawa Athletics Stadium
- J2 League: 12th

2015 Zweigen Kanazawa season.

== J2 League ==
=== League table ===
Pos	Team	Pld	W	D	L	GF	GA	GD	Pts
11	Fagiano Okayama	42	12	18	12	40	35	+5	54
12	Zweigen Kanazawa	42	12	18	12	46	43	+3	54
13	Roasso Kumamoto	42	13	14	15	42	45	−3	53

Source: Meiji Yasuda J2 League Standing
Rules for classification: 1) Points; 2) Goal difference; 3) Goals scored

=== Match details ===
J2 League match details
Match	Date	Team	Score	Team	Venue	Attendance
1	2015.03.08	Omiya Ardija	1-0	Zweigen Kanazawa	NACK5 Stadium Omiya	8,635
2	2015.03.15	Zweigen Kanazawa	3-0	Tokyo Verdy	Ishikawa Athletics Stadium	6,104
3	2015.03.20	Zweigen Kanazawa	1-2	Yokohama FC	Ishikawa Athletics Stadium	4,652
4	2015.03.29	FC Gifu	0-2	Zweigen Kanazawa	Gifu Nagaragawa Stadium	3,934
5	2015.04.01	Zweigen Kanazawa	3-1	Ehime FC	Ishikawa Athletics Stadium	1,227
6	2015.04.05	Zweigen Kanazawa	2-1	Thespakusatsu Gunma	Ishikawa Athletics Stadium	1,701
7	2015.04.11	Cerezo Osaka	0-2	Zweigen Kanazawa	Kincho Stadium	10,290
8	2015.04.19	Zweigen Kanazawa	1-0	Kamatamare Sanuki	Ishikawa Athletics Stadium	2,333
9	2015.04.26	Roasso Kumamoto	0-2	Zweigen Kanazawa	Umakana-Yokana Stadium	4,790
10	2015.04.29	Zweigen Kanazawa	1-1	Consadole Sapporo	Ishikawa Athletics Stadium	6,657
11	2015.05.03	Zweigen Kanazawa	1-0	Mito HollyHock	Ishikawa Athletics Stadium	4,407
12	2015.05.06	Tokushima Vortis	0-0	Zweigen Kanazawa	Pocarisweat Stadium	4,831
13	2015.05.09	Zweigen Kanazawa	1-1	Fagiano Okayama	Ishikawa Athletics Stadium	3,745
14	2015.05.17	JEF United Chiba	1-1	Zweigen Kanazawa	Fukuda Denshi Arena	11,396
15	2015.05.24	Tochigi SC	1-1	Zweigen Kanazawa	Tochigi Green Stadium	4,852
16	2015.05.31	Zweigen Kanazawa	1-0	V-Varen Nagasaki	Ishikawa Athletics Stadium	5,514
17	2015.06.06	Júbilo Iwata	2-1	Zweigen Kanazawa	Yamaha Stadium	12,212
18	2015.06.14	Zweigen Kanazawa	1-1	Oita Trinita	Ishikawa Athletics Stadium	6,247
19	2015.06.21	Avispa Fukuoka	0-2	Zweigen Kanazawa	Level5 Stadium	7,212
20	2015.06.28	Zweigen Kanazawa	1-3	Kyoto Sanga FC	Ishikawa Athletics Stadium	6,590
21	2015.07.04	Giravanz Kitakyushu	1-1	Zweigen Kanazawa	Honjo Stadium	1,939
22	2015.07.08	Zweigen Kanazawa	0-0	JEF United Chiba	Ishikawa Athletics Stadium	3,834
23	2015.07.12	Kamatamare Sanuki	2-2	Zweigen Kanazawa	Kagawa Marugame Stadium	2,709
24	2015.07.18	Zweigen Kanazawa	1-1	FC Gifu	Ishikawa Athletics Stadium	4,363
25	2015.07.22	Ehime FC	1-1	Zweigen Kanazawa	Ningineer Stadium	1,894
26	2015.07.26	Zweigen Kanazawa	0-1	Tokushima Vortis	Ishikawa Athletics Stadium	4,046
27	2015.08.01	Mito HollyHock	1-1	Zweigen Kanazawa	K's denki Stadium Mito	5,431
28	2015.08.08	Zweigen Kanazawa	0-1	Avispa Fukuoka	Ishikawa Athletics Stadium	4,468
29	2015.08.15	Thespakusatsu Gunma	1-0	Zweigen Kanazawa	Shoda Shoyu Stadium Gunma	3,019
30	2015.08.23	Kyoto Sanga FC	1-1	Zweigen Kanazawa	Kyoto Nishikyogoku Athletic Stadium	5,887
31	2015.09.13	Zweigen Kanazawa	0-3	Júbilo Iwata	Ishikawa Athletics Stadium	12,353
32	2015.09.20	Yokohama FC	2-1	Zweigen Kanazawa	NHK Spring Mitsuzawa Football Stadium	3,186
33	2015.09.23	V-Varen Nagasaki	1-1	Zweigen Kanazawa	Nagasaki Stadium	3,727
34	2015.09.27	Zweigen Kanazawa	1-1	Roasso Kumamoto	Ishikawa Athletics Stadium	3,163
35	2015.10.04	Zweigen Kanazawa	2-2	Tochigi SC	Ishikawa Athletics Stadium	3,217
36	2015.10.10	Consadole Sapporo	2-1	Zweigen Kanazawa	Sapporo Atsubetsu Stadium	6,981
37	2015.10.18	Fagiano Okayama	0-0	Zweigen Kanazawa	City Light Stadium	7,095
38	2015.10.26	Zweigen Kanazawa	0-4	Giravanz Kitakyushu	Ishikawa Athletics Stadium	2,255
39	2015.11.01	Oita Trinita	0-1	Zweigen Kanazawa	Oita Bank Dome	7,309
40	2015.11.08	Zweigen Kanazawa	3-0	Cerezo Osaka	Ishikawa Athletics Stadium	7,418
41	2015.11.14	Tokyo Verdy	1-1	Zweigen Kanazawa	Ajinomoto Stadium	4,298
42	2015.11.23	Zweigen Kanazawa	1-2	Omiya Ardija	Ishikawa Athletics Stadium	8,826
