= 2016 Thespakusatsu Gunma season =

Thespakusatsu Gunma
2016 season
- Manager: Hiroki Hattori
- Stadium: Shoda Shoyu Stadium Gunma
- J2 League: 17th

2016 Thespakusatsu Gunma season.

== J2 League ==
=== League table ===
Pos	Team	Pld	W	D	L	GF	GA	GD	Pts
16	Roasso Kumamoto	42	12	10	20	38	53	−15	46
17	Thespakusatsu Gunma	42	11	12	19	52	66	−14	45
18	Tokyo Verdy	42	10	13	19	43	61	−18	43

Updated to match(es) played on 20 November 2016. Source: 2016 MEIJI YASUDA J2 LEAGUE League table
Rules for classification: 1) Points; 2) Goal difference; 3) Goals scored

=== Match details ===
J2 League match details
Match	Date	Team	Score	Team	Venue	Attendance
1	2016.02.28	Thespakusatsu Gunma	4-0	FC Gifu	Shoda Shoyu Stadium Gunma	8,418
2	2016.03.06	Thespakusatsu Gunma	2-1	Zweigen Kanazawa	Shoda Shoyu Stadium Gunma	3,236
3	2016.03.12	Cerezo Osaka	1-0	Thespakusatsu Gunma	Kincho Stadium	13,495
4	2016.03.20	Thespakusatsu Gunma	1-2	Kamatamare Sanuki	Shoda Shoyu Stadium Gunma	3,195
5	2016.03.26	JEF United Chiba	0-0	Thespakusatsu Gunma	Fukuda Denshi Arena	8,555
6	2016.04.03	Mito HollyHock	1-0	Thespakusatsu Gunma	K's denki Stadium Mito	4,657
7	2016.04.09	Thespakusatsu Gunma	0-1	Kyoto Sanga FC	Shoda Shoyu Stadium Gunma	4,160
8	2016.04.16	Thespakusatsu Gunma	0-1	Fagiano Okayama	Shoda Shoyu Stadium Gunma	2,641
9	2016.04.23	Matsumoto Yamaga FC	2-1	Thespakusatsu Gunma	Matsumotodaira Park Stadium	12,034
10	2016.04.29	Thespakusatsu Gunma	2-2	Tokyo Verdy	Shoda Shoyu Stadium Gunma	3,234
11	2016.05.03	Renofa Yamaguchi FC	2-0	Thespakusatsu Gunma	Ishin Memorial Park Stadium	4,332
12	2016.05.07	Montedio Yamagata	3-1	Thespakusatsu Gunma	ND Soft Stadium Yamagata	5,362
13	2016.05.15	Thespakusatsu Gunma	3-1	Yokohama FC	Shoda Shoyu Stadium Gunma	8,369
14	2016.05.22	Tokushima Vortis	1-1	Thespakusatsu Gunma	Pocarisweat Stadium	3,649
15	2016.05.28	Shimizu S-Pulse	8-0	Thespakusatsu Gunma	IAI Stadium Nihondaira	8,310
16	2016.06.04	Thespakusatsu Gunma	1-2	Ehime FC	Shoda Shoyu Stadium Gunma	4,085
17	2016.06.08	Giravanz Kitakyushu	0-3	Thespakusatsu Gunma	Honjo Stadium	2,115
18	2016.06.12	Thespakusatsu Gunma	1-1	Roasso Kumamoto	Shoda Shoyu Stadium Gunma	4,710
19	2016.06.19	V-Varen Nagasaki	2-2	Thespakusatsu Gunma	Nagasaki Stadium	3,703
20	2016.06.26	Thespakusatsu Gunma	0-1	Hokkaido Consadole Sapporo	Shoda Shoyu Stadium Gunma	3,184
21	2016.07.03	Thespakusatsu Gunma	2-2	FC Machida Zelvia	Shoda Shoyu Stadium Gunma	2,374
22	2016.07.10	Kyoto Sanga FC	0-0	Thespakusatsu Gunma	Kyoto Nishikyogoku Athletic Stadium	4,545
23	2016.07.16	Thespakusatsu Gunma	0-2	Cerezo Osaka	Shoda Shoyu Stadium Gunma	6,986
24	2016.07.20	Thespakusatsu Gunma	2-2	Giravanz Kitakyushu	Shoda Shoyu Stadium Gunma	2,831
25	2016.07.24	Tokyo Verdy	1-2	Thespakusatsu Gunma	Ajinomoto Stadium	3,739
26	2016.07.31	Ehime FC	1-0	Thespakusatsu Gunma	Ningineer Stadium	3,278
27	2016.08.07	Thespakusatsu Gunma	2-0	Montedio Yamagata	Shoda Shoyu Stadium Gunma	3,862
28	2016.08.11	Kamatamare Sanuki	1-3	Thespakusatsu Gunma	Pikara Stadium	2,744
29	2016.08.15	Thespakusatsu Gunma	2-1	Mito HollyHock	Shoda Shoyu Stadium Gunma	4,002
30	2016.08.21	FC Machida Zelvia	0-0	Thespakusatsu Gunma	Machida Stadium	3,679
31	2016.09.11	Hokkaido Consadole Sapporo	3-1	Thespakusatsu Gunma	Sapporo Atsubetsu Stadium	9,056
32	2016.09.18	Thespakusatsu Gunma	1-1	Matsumoto Yamaga FC	Shoda Shoyu Stadium Gunma	9,804
33	2016.09.25	Zweigen Kanazawa	3-1	Thespakusatsu Gunma	Ishikawa Athletics Stadium	3,633
34	2016.10.02	Thespakusatsu Gunma	2-1	JEF United Chiba	Shoda Shoyu Stadium Gunma	6,956
35	2016.10.08	Roasso Kumamoto	1-1	Thespakusatsu Gunma	Umakana-Yokana Stadium	4,281
36	2016.10.16	Thespakusatsu Gunma	3-0	V-Varen Nagasaki	Shoda Shoyu Stadium Gunma	2,980
37	2016.10.23	Yokohama FC	3-2	Thespakusatsu Gunma	NHK Spring Mitsuzawa Football Stadium	4,751
38	2016.10.29	Thespakusatsu Gunma	0-4	Shimizu S-Pulse	Shoda Shoyu Stadium Gunma	6,227
39	2016.11.03	FC Gifu	2-1	Thespakusatsu Gunma	Gifu Nagaragawa Stadium	3,920
40	2016.11.06	Thespakusatsu Gunma	2-0	Renofa Yamaguchi FC	Shoda Shoyu Stadium Gunma	2,850
41	2016.11.12	Thespakusatsu Gunma	0-3	Tokushima Vortis	Shoda Shoyu Stadium Gunma	5,515
42	2016.11.20	Fagiano Okayama	3-3	Thespakusatsu Gunma	City Light Stadium	15,204
