= 2016 Zweigen Kanazawa season =

Zweigen Kanazawa
2016 season
- Manager: Hitoshi Morishita
- Stadium: Ishikawa Athletics Stadium
- J2 League: 21st

2016 Zweigen Kanazawa season.

== J2 League ==
=== League table ===
Pos	Team	Pld	W	D	L	GF	GA	GD	Pts	Promotion, qualification or relegation
20	FC Gifu	42	12	7	23	47	71	−24	43	
21	Zweigen Kanazawa (X)	42	8	15	19	36	60	−24	39	Qualification for relegation playoffs (Note: The playoffs and direct exchange between J2 and J3 are subject to eligibility of J2-licensed teams in top 2 of 2016 J3 League.)
22	Giravanz Kitakyushu (R)	42	8	14	20	43	64	−21	38	Relegation to 2017 J3 League

Updated to match(es) played on 20 November 2016. Source: 2016 MEIJI YASUDA J2 LEAGUE League table
Rules for classification: 1) Points; 2) Goal difference; 3) Goals scored
(R) Relegated; (X) Relegation play-off winner

=== Match details ===
J2 League match details
Match	Date	Team	Score	Team	Venue	Attendance
1	2016.02.28	Zweigen Kanazawa	1-2	V-Varen Nagasaki	Ishikawa Athletics Stadium	4,020
2	2016.03.06	Thespakusatsu Gunma	2-1	Zweigen Kanazawa	Shoda Shoyu Stadium Gunma	3,236
3	2016.03.13	Zweigen Kanazawa	0-0	Mito HollyHock	Ishikawa Athletics Stadium	2,929
4	2016.03.20	FC Machida Zelvia	2-1	Zweigen Kanazawa	Machida Stadium	4,013
5	2016.03.26	Cerezo Osaka	2-2	Zweigen Kanazawa	Kincho Stadium	11,482
6	2016.04.03	Zweigen Kanazawa	1-2	Yokohama FC	Ishikawa Athletics Stadium	5,018
7	2016.04.09	JEF United Chiba	1-0	Zweigen Kanazawa	Fukuda Denshi Arena	9,280
9	2016.04.23	Zweigen Kanazawa	1-2	FC Gifu	Ishikawa Athletics Stadium	3,008
10	2016.04.29	Shimizu S-Pulse	4-1	Zweigen Kanazawa	IAI Stadium Nihondaira	11,057
11	2016.05.03	Zweigen Kanazawa	0-1	Hokkaido Consadole Sapporo	Ishikawa Athletics Stadium	4,623
12	2016.05.07	Renofa Yamaguchi FC	0-1	Zweigen Kanazawa	Ishin Memorial Park Stadium	6,339
13	2016.05.15	Zweigen Kanazawa	1-1	Tokyo Verdy	Ishikawa Athletics Stadium	3,902
8	2016.05.18	Zweigen Kanazawa	2-1	Ehime FC	Ishikawa Athletics Stadium	1,924
14	2016.05.22	Montedio Yamagata	0-0	Zweigen Kanazawa	ND Soft Stadium Yamagata	6,483
15	2016.05.29	Zweigen Kanazawa	0-2	Matsumoto Yamaga FC	Ishikawa Athletics Stadium	7,636
16	2016.06.04	Zweigen Kanazawa	1-1	Kyoto Sanga FC	Ishikawa Athletics Stadium	3,069
17	2016.06.08	Roasso Kumamoto	5-2	Zweigen Kanazawa	Best Amenity Stadium	2,638
18	2016.06.12	Giravanz Kitakyushu	3-2	Zweigen Kanazawa	Honjo Stadium	1,795
19	2016.06.20	Zweigen Kanazawa	1-1	Fagiano Okayama	Ishikawa Athletics Stadium	2,418
20	2016.06.26	Tokushima Vortis	0-1	Zweigen Kanazawa	Pocarisweat Stadium	3,525
21	2016.07.03	Zweigen Kanazawa	0-0	Kamatamare Sanuki	Ishikawa Athletics Stadium	2,844
22	2016.07.10	Matsumoto Yamaga FC	4-2	Zweigen Kanazawa	Matsumotodaira Park Stadium	13,323
23	2016.07.16	Zweigen Kanazawa	1-0	Montedio Yamagata	Ishikawa Athletics Stadium	4,080
24	2016.07.20	FC Gifu	0-1	Zweigen Kanazawa	Gifu Nagaragawa Stadium	4,081
25	2016.07.24	Zweigen Kanazawa	0-0	Roasso Kumamoto	Ishikawa Athletics Stadium	3,304
26	2016.07.31	Mito HollyHock	3-0	Zweigen Kanazawa	K's denki Stadium Mito	4,506
27	2016.08.07	Zweigen Kanazawa	1-1	Giravanz Kitakyushu	Ishikawa Athletics Stadium	4,005
28	2016.08.11	Tokyo Verdy	4-1	Zweigen Kanazawa	Ajinomoto Stadium	3,658
29	2016.08.14	V-Varen Nagasaki	0-0	Zweigen Kanazawa	Transcosmos Stadium Nagasaki	3,413
30	2016.08.21	Zweigen Kanazawa	1-3	Cerezo Osaka	Ishikawa Athletics Stadium	9,316
31	2016.09.11	Kamatamare Sanuki	1-1	Zweigen Kanazawa	Pikara Stadium	2,419
32	2016.09.18	Zweigen Kanazawa	1-2	FC Machida Zelvia	Ishikawa Athletics Stadium	2,076
33	2016.09.25	Zweigen Kanazawa	3-1	Thespakusatsu Gunma	Ishikawa Athletics Stadium	3,633
34	2016.10.02	Kyoto Sanga FC	0-0	Zweigen Kanazawa	Kyoto Nishikyogoku Athletic Stadium	8,320
35	2016.10.08	Zweigen Kanazawa	1-0	Renofa Yamaguchi FC	Ishikawa Athletics Stadium	2,333
36	2016.10.16	Zweigen Kanazawa	0-3	Shimizu S-Pulse	Ishikawa Athletics Stadium	6,655
37	2016.10.23	Fagiano Okayama	1-2	Zweigen Kanazawa	City Light Stadium	10,031
38	2016.10.30	Zweigen Kanazawa	0-0	Tokushima Vortis	Ishikawa Athletics Stadium	4,612
39	2016.11.03	Ehime FC	3-1	Zweigen Kanazawa	Ningineer Stadium	4,895
40	2016.11.06	Zweigen Kanazawa	1-2	JEF United Chiba	Ishikawa Athletics Stadium	6,352
41	2016.11.12	Yokohama FC	0-0	Zweigen Kanazawa	NHK Spring Mitsuzawa Football Stadium	3,510
42	2016.11.20	Hokkaido Consadole Sapporo	0-0	Zweigen Kanazawa	Sapporo Dome	33,697
