= 2005 Kashiwa Reysol season =

Kashiwa Reysol 2005 football season

Kashiwa Reysol
2005 season
- Manager: Hiroshi Hayano
- Stadium: Hitachi Kashiwa Soccer Stadium
- J. League 1: 16th
- Emperor's Cup: 5th Round
- J. League Cup: GL-C 2nd
- Top goalscorer: Cléber (8)

During the 2005 season, Kashiwa Reysol competed in the J. League 1, in which they finished 16th.

== Competitions ==
Competitions	Position
J. League 1	16th / 18 clubs
Emperor's Cup	5th Round
J. League Cup	GL-C 2nd / 4 clubs

== Domestic results ==
=== J. League 1 ===
Match	Date	Venue	Opponents	Score
1	2005..	[[]]	[[]]	-
2	2005..	[[]]	[[]]	-
3	2005..	[[]]	[[]]	-
4	2005..	[[]]	[[]]	-
5	2005..	[[]]	[[]]	-
6	2005..	[[]]	[[]]	-
7	2005..	[[]]	[[]]	-
8	2005..	[[]]	[[]]	-
9	2005..	[[]]	[[]]	-
10	2005..	[[]]	[[]]	-
11	2005..	[[]]	[[]]	-
12	2005..	[[]]	[[]]	-
13	2005..	[[]]	[[]]	-
14	2005..	[[]]	[[]]	-
15	2005..	[[]]	[[]]	-
16	2005..	[[]]	[[]]	-
17	2005..	[[]]	[[]]	-
18	2005..	[[]]	[[]]	-
19	2005..	[[]]	[[]]	-
20	2005..	[[]]	[[]]	-
21	2005..	[[]]	[[]]	-
22	2005..	[[]]	[[]]	-
23	2005..	[[]]	[[]]	-
24	2005..	[[]]	[[]]	-
25	2005..	[[]]	[[]]	-
26	2005..	[[]]	[[]]	-
27	2005..	[[]]	[[]]	-
28	2005..	[[]]	[[]]	-
29	2005..	[[]]	[[]]	-
30	2005..	[[]]	[[]]	-
31	2005..	[[]]	[[]]	-
32	2005..	[[]]	[[]]	-
33	2005..	[[]]	[[]]	-
34	2005..	[[]]	[[]]	-

=== Emperor's Cup ===
Match	Date	Venue	Opponents	Score
4th Round	2005..	[[]]	[[]]	-
5th Round	2005..	[[]]	[[]]	-

=== J. League Cup ===
Match	Date	Venue	Opponents	Score
GL-C-1	2005..	[[]]	[[]]	-
GL-C-2	2005..	[[]]	[[]]	-
GL-C-3	2005..	[[]]	[[]]	-
GL-C-4	2005..	[[]]	[[]]	-
GL-C-5	2005..	[[]]	[[]]	-
GL-C-6	2005..	[[]]	[[]]	-

== Player statistics ==
No.	Pos.	Player	D.o.B. (Age)	Height / Weight	J. League 1		Emperor's Cup		J. League Cup		Total	
No.	Pos.	Player	D.o.B. (Age)	Height / Weight	Apps	Goals	Apps	Goals	Apps	Goals	Apps	Goals
1	GK	Yuta Minami	September 30, 1979 (aged 25)	cm / kg	33	0						
2	DF	Ryo Kobayashi	September 12, 1982 (aged 22)	cm / kg	21	1						
3	DF	Norihiro Satsukawa	April 18, 1972 (aged 32)	cm / kg	19	0						
4	DF	Yasuhiro Hato	May 4, 1976 (aged 28)	cm / kg	30	0						
5	DF	Sota Nakazawa	October 26, 1982 (aged 22)	cm / kg	16	0						
7	MF	Tomokazu Myojin	January 24, 1978 (aged 27)	cm / kg	28	1						
8	MF	Ricardinho	June 24, 1976 (aged 28)	cm / kg	8	0						
8	FW	Reinaldo	March 14, 1979 (aged 25)	cm / kg	12	6						
9	FW	Yoshiteru Yamashita	November 21, 1977 (aged 27)	cm / kg	9	1						
10	MF	Cléber Santana	June 27, 1981 (aged 23)	cm / kg	29	8						
11	MF	Choi Sung-Kuk	February 8, 1983 (aged 22)	cm / kg	8	0						
11	FW	França	March 2, 1976 (aged 29)	cm / kg	3	0						
12	MF	Tadatoshi Masuda	December 25, 1973 (aged 31)	cm / kg	15	0						
13	DF	Yuzo Kobayashi	November 15, 1985 (aged 19)	cm / kg	19	1						
14	MF	Harutaka Ono	May 12, 1978 (aged 26)	cm / kg	18	1						
15	MF	Tatsuya Yazawa	October 3, 1984 (aged 20)	cm / kg	21	1						
16	GK	Erikson Noguchipinto	January 27, 1981 (aged 24)	cm / kg	0	0						
17	DF	Yukio Tsuchiya	July 31, 1974 (aged 30)	cm / kg	30	2						
18	FW	Kisho Yano	April 5, 1984 (aged 20)	cm / kg	19	2						
19	FW	Yuji Unozawa	May 3, 1983 (aged 21)	cm / kg	13	0						
20	DF	Mitsuru Nagata	April 6, 1983 (aged 21)	cm / kg	5	1						
21	GK	Kenta Shimizu	September 18, 1981 (aged 23)	cm / kg	0	0						
22	FW	Tatsuya Suzuki	August 1, 1982 (aged 22)	cm / kg	1	0						
23	MF	Hidekazu Otani	November 6, 1984 (aged 20)	cm / kg	20	3						
24	MF	Tomonori Hirayama	January 9, 1978 (aged 27)	cm / kg	27	2						
25	FW	Tadanari Lee	December 19, 1985 (aged 19)	cm / kg	8	0						
26	DF	Naoya Kondo	October 3, 1983 (aged 21)	cm / kg	12	0						
28	FW	Keiji Tamada	April 11, 1980 (aged 24)	cm / kg	28	6						
29	FW	Sotaro Yasunaga	April 20, 1976 (aged 28)	cm / kg	8	1						
30	MF	Shinya Tanoue	February 5, 1980 (aged 25)	cm / kg	0	0						
31	GK	Shinya Kato	September 19, 1980 (aged 24)	cm / kg	1	0						
32	DF	Naoki Ishikawa	September 13, 1985 (aged 19)	cm / kg	2	0						
34	MF	Jun Yanagisawa	June 27, 1987 (aged 17)	cm / kg	1	0						
