= Erikson Noguchipinto =

Japanese footballer (born 1981)

Erikson Noguchipinto ノグチピント・エリキソン
Personal information
- Birth name: Erikson Frank Noguchi Pinto
- Date of birth: January 27, 1981 (age 45)
- Place of birth: Rio de Janeiro, Brazil
- Height: 1.83 m (6 ft 0 in)
- Position: Goalkeeper

Youth career
- Raiha SSS
- Kazo Nishi Junior High School
- Teikyo High School

Senior career*
Years	Team	Apps	(Gls)
2001–2003	Oita Trinita	0	(0)
2002	→Sagan Tosu (loan)	1	(0)
2004–2006	Kashiwa Reysol	2	(0)
2007	Avispa Fukuoka	0	(0)
2008	Valiente Koriyama	1	(0)
2008–2009	AC Nagano Parceiro	13	(0)
2010–2011	Samutsongkhram	40	(0)
2012–2013	PTT Rayong	31	(0)
2014	Samutsongkhram	13	(0)
2014	Ayutthaya	2	(0)
Total		103	(0)
- * Club domestic league appearances and goals

Erikson Noguchipinto (ノグチピント・エリキソン, Noguchipinto Erikson; born Erikson Frank Noguchi Pinto; January 27, 1981) is a former football player.

He moved to Japan at age 10 and obtained his Japanese citizenship in 2003. Although he is Brazilian Japanese and thus entitled to have his maternal surname Noguchi as his legal Japanese surname, he chose a combination of his paternal and maternal surnames as his legal Japanese surname.

== Playing career ==
Noguchipinto was born in Rio de Janeiro on January 27, 1981. He joined J2 League club Oita Trinita in 2001. However he could not play at all in the match. In 2002, he moved to J2 club Sagan Tosu on loan due to restrictions on foreign players. On September 15, he debuted against his older club Trinita. In 2003, he returned to Trinita as a trainee. He obtained his Japanese citizenship in April 2003 and signed as a top team player. However he could not play at all in the match. In 2004, he moved to J1 League club Kashiwa Reysol. He played several matches in 3 seasons. In 2006, he moved to J2 club Avispa Fukuoka. However he could not play at all in the match. In 2008, he moved to Prefectural Leagues club Valiente Koriyama. In July 2008, he moved to Regional Leagues club AC Nagano Parceiro. He played as regular goalkeeper until 2009. In 2010, he moved to Thailand. His career winded down in Thailand, most notably for Samut Songkhram, then in the country's top flight. He retired end of 2014 season.

== Club statistics ==
Club performance			League		Cup		League Cup		Total	
Season	Club	League	Apps	Goals	Apps	Goals	Apps	Goals	Apps	Goals
Japan			League		Emperor's Cup		J.League Cup		Total	
2001	Oita Trinita	J2 League	0	0	0	0	0	0	0	0
2002	Sagan Tosu	J2 League	1	0	2	0	-		3	0
2003	Oita Trinita	J1 League	0	0	0	0	0	0	0	0
2004	Kashiwa Reysol	J1 League	1	0	1	0	2	0	4	0
2005	Kashiwa Reysol	J1 League	0	0	0	0	1	0	1	0
2006	Kashiwa Reysol	J2 League	1	0	1	0	-		2	0
2007	Avispa Fukuoka	J2 League	0	0	0	0	-		0	0
2008	Valiente Koriyama	Prefectural Leagues	1	0	-		-		1	0
2008	AC Nagano Parceiro	Regional Leagues	2	0	-		-		2	0
2009	AC Nagano Parceiro	Regional Leagues	11	0	-		-		11	0
Total			17	0	4	0	3	0	24	0
