= 2017 Thespakusatsu Gunma season =

Thespakusatsu Gunma
2017 season
- Manager: Hitoshi Morishita
- Stadium: Shoda Shoyu Stadium Gunma
- J2 League: 22nd

2017 Thespakusatsu Gunma season.

== J2 League ==
=== League table ===
Pos	Team	Pld	W	D	L	GF	GA	GD	Pts	Promotion, qualification or relegation
20	Renofa Yamaguchi	42	11	5	26	48	69	−21	38	
21	Roasso Kumamoto	42	9	10	23	36	59	−23	37	
22	Thespakusatsu Gunma (R)	42	5	5	32	32	88	−56	20	Relegation to 2018 J3 League (Note: Direct exchange between J2 and J3 is subject to eligibility of J2-licensed teams in top 2 of 2017 J3 League.)

Updated to match(es) played on 28 November 2017. Source: 2017 MEIJI YASUDA J2 LEAGUE League table
Rules for classification: 1) Points; 2) Goal difference; 3) Goals scored
(R) Relegated

=== Match details ===
J2 League match details
Match	Date	Team	Score	Team	Venue	Attendance
1	2017.02.26	V-Varen Nagasaki	4-0	Thespakusatsu Gunma	Transcosmos Stadium Nagasaki	4,394
2	2017.03.04	Shonan Bellmare	3-1	Thespakusatsu Gunma	Shonan BMW Stadium Hiratsuka	9,021
3	2017.03.12	Yokohama FC	1-0	Thespakusatsu Gunma	NHK Spring Mitsuzawa Football Stadium	5,214
4	2017.03.19	Thespakusatsu Gunma	0-1	FC Machida Zelvia	Shoda Shoyu Stadium Gunma	4,694
5	2017.03.26	Thespakusatsu Gunma	1-2	Fagiano Okayama	Shoda Shoyu Stadium Gunma	2,204
6	2017.04.02	Zweigen Kanazawa	2-0	Thespakusatsu Gunma	Ishikawa Athletics Stadium	3,480
7	2017.04.08	JEF United Chiba	1-1	Thespakusatsu Gunma	Fukuda Denshi Arena	7,361
8	2017.04.15	Thespakusatsu Gunma	0-1	Mito HollyHock	Shoda Shoyu Stadium Gunma	5,802
9	2017.04.22	Tokyo Verdy	3-1	Thespakusatsu Gunma	Ajinomoto Stadium	2,786
10	2017.04.29	Thespakusatsu Gunma	1-4	Nagoya Grampus	Shoda Shoyu Stadium Gunma	5,629
11	2017.05.03	Thespakusatsu Gunma	0-2	FC Gifu	Shoda Shoyu Stadium Gunma	3,058
12	2017.05.07	Roasso Kumamoto	1-2	Thespakusatsu Gunma	Egao Kenko Stadium	4,777
13	2017.05.13	Thespakusatsu Gunma	0-3	Ehime FC	Shoda Shoyu Stadium Gunma	1,402
14	2017.05.17	Thespakusatsu Gunma	2-1	Renofa Yamaguchi FC	Shoda Shoyu Stadium Gunma	1,617
15	2017.05.21	Kamatamare Sanuki	1-2	Thespakusatsu Gunma	Pikara Stadium	2,517
16	2017.05.28	Avispa Fukuoka	1-3	Thespakusatsu Gunma	Level5 Stadium	8,025
17	2017.06.03	Thespakusatsu Gunma	0-2	Tokushima Vortis	Shoda Shoyu Stadium Gunma	4,186
18	2017.06.11	Montedio Yamagata	1-0	Thespakusatsu Gunma	ND Soft Stadium Yamagata	6,639
19	2017.06.18	Thespakusatsu Gunma	0-2	Matsumoto Yamaga FC	Shoda Shoyu Stadium Gunma	6,828
20	2017.06.25	Thespakusatsu Gunma	0-4	Oita Trinita	Shoda Shoyu Stadium Gunma	3,421
21	2017.07.01	Kyoto Sanga FC	1-0	Thespakusatsu Gunma	Kyoto Nishikyogoku Athletic Stadium	6,561
22	2017.07.08	FC Machida Zelvia	2-0	Thespakusatsu Gunma	Machida Stadium	3,619
23	2017.07.16	Thespakusatsu Gunma	1-3	Avispa Fukuoka	Shoda Shoyu Stadium Gunma	3,366
24	2017.07.22	Thespakusatsu Gunma	1-1	Roasso Kumamoto	Shoda Shoyu Stadium Gunma	3,179
25	2017.07.30	FC Gifu	2-0	Thespakusatsu Gunma	Gifu Nagaragawa Stadium	4,629
26	2017.08.05	Thespakusatsu Gunma	0-1	Montedio Yamagata	Shoda Shoyu Stadium Gunma	2,670
27	2017.08.11	Thespakusatsu Gunma	1-2	Kamatamare Sanuki	Shoda Shoyu Stadium Gunma	2,589
28	2017.08.16	Renofa Yamaguchi FC	3-2	Thespakusatsu Gunma	Ishin Memorial Park Stadium	5,658
29	2017.08.20	Thespakusatsu Gunma	1-1	Zweigen Kanazawa	Shoda Shoyu Stadium Gunma	2,509
30	2017.08.26	Thespakusatsu Gunma	0-2	Shonan Bellmare	Shoda Shoyu Stadium Gunma	5,349
31	2017.09.02	Oita Trinita	1-0	Thespakusatsu Gunma	Oita Bank Dome	7,418
32	2017.09.10	Thespakusatsu Gunma	2-0	JEF United Chiba	Shoda Shoyu Stadium Gunma	4,448
33	2017.09.16	Matsumoto Yamaga FC	3-0	Thespakusatsu Gunma	Matsumotodaira Park Stadium	10,320
34	2017.09.24	Mito HollyHock	4-0	Thespakusatsu Gunma	K's denki Stadium Mito	4,887
35	2017.10.01	Thespakusatsu Gunma	1-1	Yokohama FC	Shoda Shoyu Stadium Gunma	6,674
36	2017.10.07	Tokushima Vortis	4-1	Thespakusatsu Gunma	Pocarisweat Stadium	3,860
37	2017.10.15	Thespakusatsu Gunma	1-2	Tokyo Verdy	Shoda Shoyu Stadium Gunma	2,216
38	2017.10.22	Fagiano Okayama	2-1	Thespakusatsu Gunma	City Light Stadium	9,436
39	2017.10.29	Nagoya Grampus	4-2	Thespakusatsu Gunma	Paloma Mizuho Stadium	7,393
40	2017.11.05	Thespakusatsu Gunma	1-1	Kyoto Sanga FC	Shoda Shoyu Stadium Gunma	2,912
41	2017.11.12	Ehime FC	4-2	Thespakusatsu Gunma	Ningineer Stadium	3,198
42	2017.11.19	Thespakusatsu Gunma	1-4	V-Varen Nagasaki	Shoda Shoyu Stadium Gunma	5,712
