= 2015 Cerezo Osaka season =

Cerezo Osaka
2015 season
- Manager: Paulo Autuori; Kiyoshi Okuma
- Stadium: Yanmar Stadium Nagai
- J2 League: 4th
- Emperor's Cup: First Round (1–2 to FC Osaka)
Home colours	Away colours

The 2015 Cerezo Osaka season was the club's fourth in the J2 League and first following their relegation from the 2014 J.League Division 1. The club finished in 4th place and advanced to the J2 League promotion playoffs, where they failed to achieve promotion after drawing Avispa Fukuoka 1–1 in the promotion playoff final. Avispa had finished in 3rd place and won the tiebreaker, which was based on the league standings instead of going to extra time after scoring an 87th-minute goal. Cerezo Osaka lost in the first round of the Emperor's Cup to FC Osaka on 29 August in front of 4,467 spectators.

== J2 League ==
=== League table ===
Pos	Team	Pld	W	D	L	GF	GA	GD	Pts	Promotion, qualification or relegation
3	Avispa Fukuoka (O, P)	42	24	10	8	63	37	+26	82	Qualification for promotion playoffs (Note: Only teams that meet J1 license criteria can participate in promotion playoffs. If one or more teams fail to meet the criteria, only eligible teams that finished 3rd to 6th will participate and no replacement teams will be added.)
4	Cerezo Osaka	42	18	13	11	57	40	+17	67	Qualification for promotion playoffs
5	Ehime FC	42	19	8	15	47	39	+8	65	Qualification for promotion playoffs

Source: Meiji Yasuda J2 League Standing
Rules for classification: 1) Points; 2) Goal difference; 3) Goals scored
(O) Play-off winners; (P) Promoted

=== Match details ===
J2 League match details
Match	Date	Team	Score	Team	Venue	Attendance
1	2015.03.08	Tokyo Verdy	1–1	Cerezo Osaka	Ajinomoto Stadium	12,217
2	2015.03.15	Cerezo Osaka	3–1	Omiya Ardija	Yanmar Stadium Nagai	15,584
3	2015.03.21	Fagiano Okayama	1–1	Cerezo Osaka	City Light Stadium	15,820
4	2015.03.29	Cerezo Osaka	2–0	Yokohama FC	Yanmar Stadium Nagai	14,518
5	2015.04.01	JEF United Chiba	4–4	Cerezo Osaka	Fukuda Denshi Arena	12,516
6	2015.04.05	FC Gifu	0–2	Cerezo Osaka	Gifu Nagaragawa Stadium	8,139
7	2015.04.11	Cerezo Osaka	0–2	Zweigen Kanazawa	Kincho Stadium	10,290
8	2015.04.19	Cerezo Osaka	1–2	Thespakusatsu Gunma	Yanmar Stadium Nagai	17,212
9	2015.04.26	Kamatamare Sanuki	1–3	Cerezo Osaka	Kagawa Marugame Stadium	10,447
10	2015.04.29	Cerezo Osaka	3–0	Kyoto Sanga FC	Kincho Stadium	14,631
11	2015.05.03	Avispa Fukuoka	1–0	Cerezo Osaka	Level5 Stadium	12,301
12	2015.05.06	Cerezo Osaka	1–2	Júbilo Iwata	Kincho Stadium	15,914
13	2015.05.09	Giravanz Kitakyushu	0–3	Cerezo Osaka	Honjo Stadium	5,041
14	2015.05.17	Cerezo Osaka	1–2	V-Varen Nagasaki	Kincho Stadium	10,900
15	2015.05.24	Roasso Kumamoto	0–0	Cerezo Osaka	Umakana-Yokana Stadium	13,132
16	2015.06.01	Consadole Sapporo	1–1	Cerezo Osaka	Sapporo Dome	18,044
17	2015.06.06	Cerezo Osaka	1–0	Ehime FC	Yanmar Stadium Nagai	16,116
18	2015.06.14	Mito HollyHock	1–1	Cerezo Osaka	K's denki Stadium Mito	8,391
19	2015.06.21	Cerezo Osaka	1–0	Tokushima Vortis	Kincho Stadium	11,332
20	2015.06.28	Tochigi SC	0–3	Cerezo Osaka	Tochigi Green Stadium	7,077
21	2015.07.04	Cerezo Osaka	0–0	Oita Trinita	Kincho Stadium	8,946
22	2015.07.08	Yokohama FC	0–0	Cerezo Osaka	NHK Spring Mitsuzawa Football Stadium	3,728
23	2015.07.12	Cerezo Osaka	3–1	Consadole Sapporo	Kincho Stadium	9,602
24	2015.07.18	Kyoto Sanga FC	1–0	Cerezo Osaka	Kyoto Nishikyogoku Athletic Stadium	13,998
25	2015.07.22	Cerezo Osaka	2–1	Fagiano Okayama	Kincho Stadium	8,047
26	2015.07.26	Júbilo Iwata	0–1	Cerezo Osaka	Yamaha Stadium	12,868
27	2015.08.01	Ehime FC	2–1	Cerezo Osaka	Ningineer Stadium	7,177
28	2015.08.08	Cerezo Osaka	1–1	JEF United Chiba	Kincho Stadium	11,502
29	2015.08.15	Cerezo Osaka	1–0	FC Gifu	Kincho Stadium	11,304
30	2015.08.23	Oita Trinita	1–3	Cerezo Osaka	Oita Bank Dome	10,229
31	2015.09.13	Cerezo Osaka	4–1	Tochigi SC	Kincho Stadium	11,093
32	2015.09.20	Omiya Ardija	1–2	Cerezo Osaka	Kumagaya Athletic Stadium	14,410
33	2015.09.23	Cerezo Osaka	2–2	Mito HollyHock	Yanmar Stadium Nagai	14,975
34	2015.09.27	Tokushima Vortis	1–1	Cerezo Osaka	Pocarisweat Stadium	7,988
35	2015.10.04	Cerezo Osaka	0–1	Avispa Fukuoka	Yanmar Stadium Nagai	13,843
36	2015.10.10	Cerezo Osaka	1–0	Giravanz Kitakyushu	Kincho Stadium	8,581
37	2015.10.18	Thespakusatsu Gunma	2–0	Cerezo Osaka	Shoda Shoyu Stadium Gunma	6,916
38	2015.10.25	Cerezo Osaka	0–0	Kamatamare Sanuki	Kincho Stadium	10,283
39	2015.11.01	Cerezo Osaka	1–1	Roasso Kumamoto	Kincho Stadium	10,194
40	2015.11.08	Zweigen Kanazawa	3–0	Cerezo Osaka	Ishikawa Athletics Stadium	7,418
41	2015.11.14	V-Varen Nagasaki	2–0	Cerezo Osaka	Nagasaki Stadium	7,962
42	2015.11.23	Cerezo Osaka	2–0	Tokyo Verdy	Kincho Stadium	12,013
