= Takumi Wada =

Japanese footballer

Personal information
- Full name: Takumi Wada 和田 拓三
- Date of birth: October 20, 1981 (age 45)
- Place of birth: Hamamatsu, Shizuoka, Japan
- Height: 1.76 m (5 ft 9 1/2 in)
- Position: Defender

Youth career
- 1997–1999: Hamana High School
- 2000–2003: Nihon University

Senior career*
Years	Team	Apps	(Gls)
2004–2006	Shimizu S-Pulse	17	(0)
2007	Yokohama FC	23	(1)
2008	Tokyo Verdy	22	(1)
2009–2010	JEF United Chiba	27	(1)
2011–2012	Avispa Fukuoka	45	(0)
Total		134	(3)
Medal record
Shimizu S-Pulse
Runner-up	Emperor's Cup	2005
- * Club domestic league appearances and goals

Takumi Wada (和田 拓三, Wada Takumi; born October 20, 1981) is a former Japanese football player.

He has the dubious distinction of having been relegated with four clubs in five years from 2007 to 2011 (Yokohama FC, Tokyo Verdy, JEF United Chiba and Avispa Fukuoka).

== Career statistics ==
Appearances and goals by club, season and competition
Club	Season	League			Emperor's Cup		J.League Cup		Total	
Club	Season	Division	Apps	Goals	Apps	Goals	Apps	Goals	Apps	Goals
Shimizu S-Pulse	2004	J1 League	11	0	0	0	4	0	15	0
Shimizu S-Pulse	2005	J1 League	2	0	0	0	2	0	4	0
Shimizu S-Pulse	2006	J1 League	4	0	0	0	1	0	5	0
Yokohama FC	2007	J1 League	23	1	0	0	4	0	27	1
Tokyo Verdy	2008	J1 League	22	1	1	0	3	0	26	1
JEF United Chiba	2009	J1 League	19	1	3	1	3	0	25	2
JEF United Chiba	2010	J2 League	8	0	2	0	—		10	0
Avispa Fukuoka	2011	J1 League	21	0	1	0	0	0	22	0
Avispa Fukuoka	2012	J2 League	24	0	2	0	—		26	0
Career total			134	3	9	1	17	0	160	4
