= Hamana High School =

School in Hamamatsu, Japan

Coordinates: 34°48′21.3″N 137°47′45.1″E

Shizuoka Prefectural Hamana Senior High School
- 静岡県立浜名高等学校
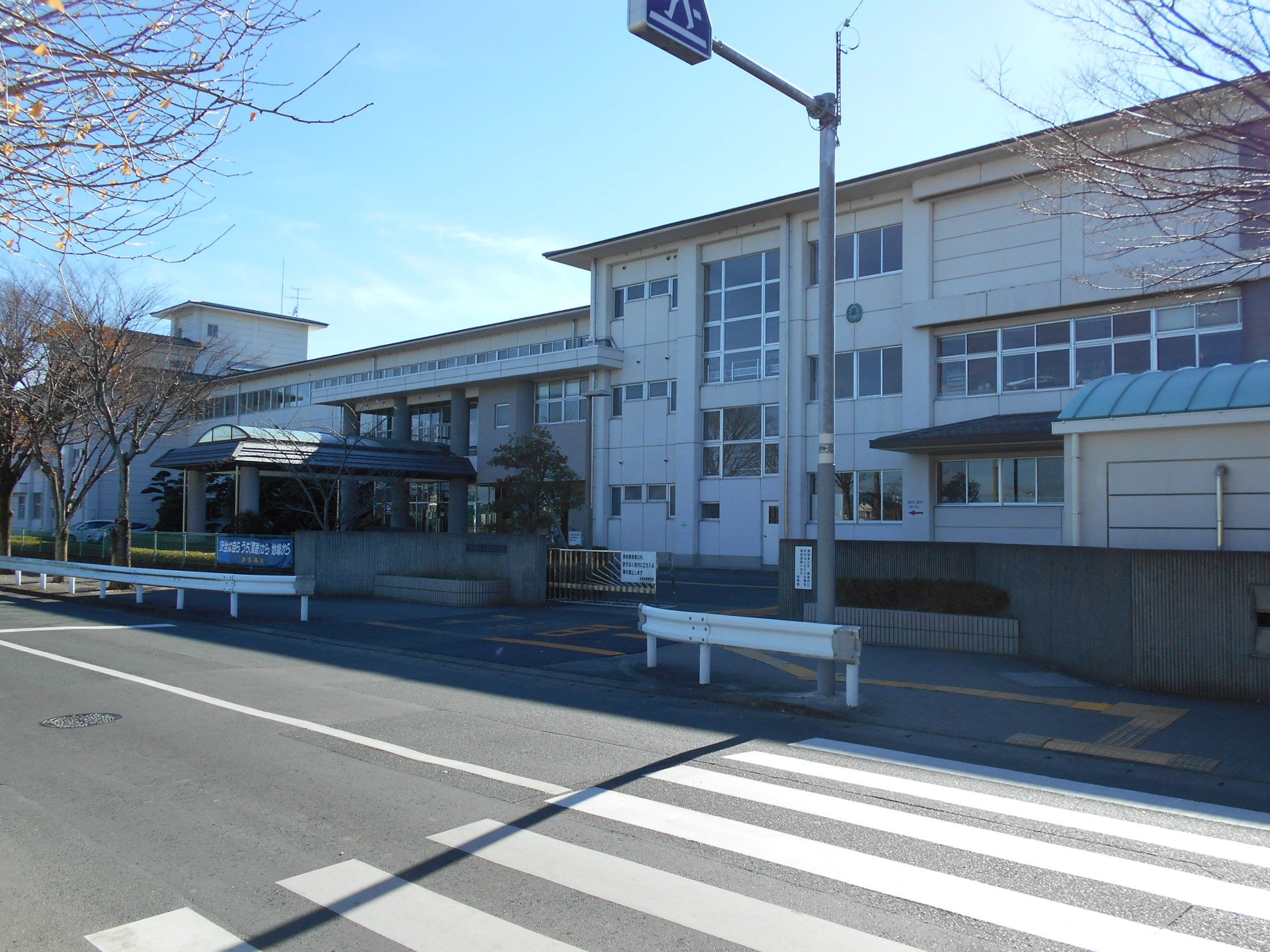

Location
- 2939-1 Misono, Hamana-ku; Hamamatsu-shi, Shizuoka-ken 434-0033; Japan

Information
- Type: Public secondary, co-educational
- Established: 1913
- Grades: 10-12
- Website: www.hamana-shizuoka.jp

Shizuoka Prefectural Hamana Senior High School (静岡県立浜名高等学校, Shizuoka Kenritsu Hamana Kōtōgakkō) is a public co-educational senior high school in Hamana-ku, Hamamatsu, Japan.

== Overview ==
Hamana High School is a public senior high school with two departments, a full-time day school and a part-time evening school.

== History ==
The school was founded in 1913 as the Kitahama Sewing Cram School for girls. In 1947, the Kitahama High School merged with Kasai Girls' High School and the next year the name was changed to Shizuoka Prefectural Hamana Senior High School.

=== Chronology ===
==== Kitahama Girls' High School ====
- 1913: Kitahama Sewing Cram School for girls was founded.
- 1914: Approval of Kitahama practical course girls' school.
- 1919: Promotion to Kitahama practical course girls' high school.
- 1926: School became Kitahama girls' high school.

==== Kasai Girls' High School ====
- 1925: Kasai Vocational School for girls was founded.
- 1937: Approval of Kasai Vocational High School for girls.
- 1944: Promotion to Kasai Commercial School for girls.
- 1946: School became Kasai Girls' High School.

==== Hamana Senior High School ====
- 1947: Kitahama Girls' High School merged with Kasai Girls' High School to become Hamana Girls' High School.
- 1948: The school was renamed Hamana High School and a part-time course was set up.
- 1950: The school house was built.
- 1953: The gymnasium was completed.
- 1955: Schooling system became a full-time course.
- 1956: School song was written and adopted.
- 1962: The new school building was completed in its current location.
- 1963: It changed to a full-time schooling system, including a general education part with about 300 students, a home economics part with 100 students and a commercial part with 200 students.
- 1973: The commercial part was closed down. The general education part was increased to 6 classes and the home economics was decreased to 2 classes, 8 classes in total.
- 1984: The home economics section was closed down.
- 1995: Construction began on the current school building.
- 1997: Ceremony to celebrate the completion of the current building.

== Calendar of School Events ==
The Japanese school year begins near the beginning of April and ends in mid-March, with 5–6 weeks of summer vacation from the last week of July to the end of August and about 2 weeks of winter vacation around the New Year's holiday.

- April- Entrance Ceremony
- June- School Festival
- September- Disaster drill, Cultural field trip to watch a play or musical, Sports Festival, School Trip
- October- Field trip or school trip
- November- Disaster drill, Health Lecture, Traffic Safety Lecture
- January- School Marathon
- March- Graduation ceremony

== Courses ==
=== Rigorous Academics Course ===
In this course, students have supplementary classes every morning before school and two times a week after school in addition to their regular classes. The focus in these classes is on studying. Students in this course aim to enter prestigious national or public universities.

=== Science Course ===
In this course, the focus is on the sciences and the curriculum includes many math classes. Students have math classes twice a day on some days.

=== Literary Course I ===
In this course, students study all subjects including math and science.

=== Literary Course II ===
In this course, there is less emphasis on math and science. Students take classes in art, music, calligraphy or dress design.

== School clubs ==
As in most Japanese high schools, the school clubs at Hamana are mandatory. Students join only one club and generally continue it throughout high school. Students have one opportunity after their first year to change their club. Students finish their club activity requirement after the first semester of their final year to concentrate on studying, the exception being some athletic clubs.

=== Athletic Clubs ===
Athletic clubs meet almost every day to practice. Students often practice after school, during holidays and school vacations.

- Soccer

Hamana has a strong soccer team which has competed at the national level multiple times in the All Japan High School Soccer Tournament.

- Baseball

Hamana's baseball team also attended at a national event, competing in the 75th Japanese High School Baseball Championship as one of 3 teams representing the Tōkai region in 2003. The baseball team has also participated in the Shizuoka Prefectural Baseball Tournament.

- Other athletic clubs, many of which also compete at the prefectural or national level, include volleyball, softball, swimming, track and field, basketball (boys and girls), soft tennis (boys and girls), badminton (boys and girls), and kendo.

=== Cultural Clubs ===
There are many cultural clubs at Hamana. These clubs usually meet just one hour a week on Fridays, with the exception being the dance club which meets more often to practice.

==== List of cultural clubs ====
- English
- Math
- Dance
- Art
- Computer
- Photography
- Handmade
- Japanese chess (shogi and go)
- Japanese calligraphy
- Drama
- Tea Ceremony
- Flower arrangement
- Natural Science
- History
- Brass band

== School Festival ==
It is held on a Friday and Saturday around the beginning of June. In-school performances are held on Friday with the whole school in attendance. On the Friday morning, there is a dance club performance, a drama club performance and a concert by the school brass band. In the afternoon there are several guest performers for example musicians or comedians. On the Saturday morning, the student bands play. The festival is open to the public from mid-morning on Saturday. There are classroom exhibitions from the cultural clubs, including photo and flower arrangements. The dance club and drama club have performances and the English club often performs puppet shows in English. The tea ceremony club offers the experience to try the tea ceremony for a small fee. Visitors can enjoy games created by the computer club members. There are also classroom exhibitions by the second and third grade home rooms which include games and activities for visitors to enjoy.

== Alumni ==
- Takahiro Mazuka
- Kisho Yano
- Masaaki Yanagishita
- Takumi Wada
- Takuya Matsuura
- Masaya Sato
