= 2013 Montedio Yamagata season =

Montedio Yamagata
2013 season
- Manager: Ryosuke Okuno
- Stadium: ND Soft Stadium Yamagata
- J2 League: 10th

2013 Montedio Yamagata season.

== J2 League ==
Match	Date	Team	Score	Team	Venue	Attendance
1	2013.03.03	Ehime FC	3-1	Montedio Yamagata	Ningineer Stadium	4,474
2	2013.03.10	Avispa Fukuoka	2-1	Montedio Yamagata	Level5 Stadium	7,204
3	2013.03.17	Montedio Yamagata	2-0	V-Varen Nagasaki	ND Soft Stadium Yamagata	7,161
4	2013.03.20	Montedio Yamagata	2-1	Tochigi SC	ND Soft Stadium Yamagata	6,011
5	2013.03.24	Giravanz Kitakyushu	1-2	Montedio Yamagata	Honjo Stadium	3,146
6	2013.03.31	Montedio Yamagata	5-1	Yokohama FC	ND Soft Stadium Yamagata	5,510
7	2013.04.07	Vissel Kobe	1-0	Montedio Yamagata	Noevir Stadium Kobe	10,559
8	2013.04.14	Montedio Yamagata	0-1	Gamba Osaka	ND Soft Stadium Yamagata	17,223
9	2013.04.17	Tokyo Verdy	2-0	Montedio Yamagata	Ajinomoto Stadium	3,057
10	2013.04.21	Montedio Yamagata	1-0	Roasso Kumamoto	ND Soft Stadium Yamagata	4,433
11	2013.04.28	FC Gifu	1-1	Montedio Yamagata	Gifu Nagaragawa Stadium	4,120
12	2013.05.03	Montedio Yamagata	3-1	Kataller Toyama	ND Soft Stadium Yamagata	7,292
13	2013.05.06	Fagiano Okayama	4-3	Montedio Yamagata	Kanko Stadium	11,117
14	2013.05.12	Montedio Yamagata	0-1	Consadole Sapporo	ND Soft Stadium Yamagata	6,460
15	2013.05.19	Gainare Tottori	0-6	Montedio Yamagata	Tottori Bank Bird Stadium	1,677
16	2013.05.26	Montedio Yamagata	1-2	Kyoto Sanga FC	ND Soft Stadium Yamagata	6,811
17	2013.06.01	JEF United Chiba	1-3	Montedio Yamagata	Fukuda Denshi Arena	11,041
18	2013.06.08	Montedio Yamagata	2-2	Tokushima Vortis	ND Soft Stadium Yamagata	6,509
19	2013.06.15	Thespakusatsu Gunma	2-2	Montedio Yamagata	Shoda Shoyu Stadium Gunma	2,086
20	2013.06.22	Montedio Yamagata	4-1	Matsumoto Yamaga FC	ND Soft Stadium Yamagata	7,128
21	2013.06.29	Mito HollyHock	1-3	Montedio Yamagata	K's denki Stadium Mito	5,746
22	2013.07.03	Montedio Yamagata	2-3	Gainare Tottori	ND Soft Stadium Yamagata	5,128
23	2013.07.07	V-Varen Nagasaki	2-1	Montedio Yamagata	Nagasaki Stadium	3,249
24	2013.07.14	Montedio Yamagata	0-3	JEF United Chiba	ND Soft Stadium Yamagata	10,020
25	2013.07.20	Montedio Yamagata	1-2	Fagiano Okayama	ND Soft Stadium Yamagata	5,142
26	2013.07.27	Roasso Kumamoto	1-1	Montedio Yamagata	Umakana-Yokana Stadium	5,013
27	2013.08.04	Kyoto Sanga FC	1-1	Montedio Yamagata	Kyoto Nishikyogoku Athletic Stadium	6,424
28	2013.08.11	Montedio Yamagata	1-1	Thespakusatsu Gunma	ND Soft Stadium Yamagata	7,032
29	2013.08.18	Montedio Yamagata	3-2	Vissel Kobe	ND Soft Stadium Yamagata	7,553
30	2013.08.21	Tochigi SC	1-1	Montedio Yamagata	Tochigi Green Stadium	3,155
31	2013.08.25	Kataller Toyama	1-3	Montedio Yamagata	Toyama Stadium	4,472
32	2013.09.01	Montedio Yamagata	2-1	Mito HollyHock	ND Soft Stadium Yamagata	6,428
33	2013.09.16	Tokushima Vortis	2-2	Montedio Yamagata	Pocarisweat Stadium	3,414
34	2013.09.22	Montedio Yamagata	2-1	Avispa Fukuoka	ND Soft Stadium Yamagata	6,147
35	2013.09.29	Montedio Yamagata	0-1	Giravanz Kitakyushu	ND Soft Stadium Yamagata	6,646
36	2013.10.06	Yokohama FC	1-1	Montedio Yamagata	Ajinomoto Field Nishigaoka	4,717
37	2013.10.20	Consadole Sapporo	3-1	Montedio Yamagata	Sapporo Dome	9,304
38	2013.10.27	Montedio Yamagata	3-0	Ehime FC	ND Soft Stadium Yamagata	5,795
39	2013.11.03	Montedio Yamagata	2-2	FC Gifu	ND Soft Stadium Yamagata	5,869
40	2013.11.10	Matsumoto Yamaga FC	2-3	Montedio Yamagata	Matsumotodaira Park Stadium	8,147
41	2013.11.17	Gamba Osaka	3-2	Montedio Yamagata	Expo '70 Commemorative Stadium	13,970
42	2013.11.24	Montedio Yamagata	0-0	Tokyo Verdy	ND Soft Stadium Yamagata	7,118
