= Masaaki Yanagishita =

Japanese footballer and manager

Masaaki Yanagishita 柳下 正明
Personal information
- Full name: Masaaki Yanagishita
- Date of birth: January 1, 1960 (age 66)
- Place of birth: Hamamatsu, Shizuoka, Japan
- Height: 1.76 m (5 ft 9 1/2 in)
- Position: Defender

Youth career
- 1975–1977: Hamana High School
- 1978–1981: Tokyo University of Agriculture

Senior career*
| Years | Team | Apps | (Gls) |
| 1982–1992 | Yamaha Motors | 135 | (0) |
| Total | | 135 | (0) |

International career
| 1979 | Japan U-20 | 3 | (0) |

Managerial career
- 2003: Júbilo Iwata
- 2004–2006: Consadole Sapporo
- 2009–2011: Júbilo Iwata
- 2012–2015: Albirex Niigata
- 2017–2023: Zweigen Kanazawa
- 2024: Tochigi SC (assistant)
Medal record
Yamaha Motors
| Winner | Japan Soccer League | 1987/88 |
| Runner-up | JSL Cup | 1989 |
| Winner | Emperor's Cup | 1982 |
| Runner-up | Emperor's Cup | 1989 |
- * Club domestic league appearances and goals

Masaaki Yanagishita (柳下 正明, Yanagishita Masaaki; born January 1, 1960) is a former Japanese football player and manager.

== Club career ==
Yanagishita was born in Hamamatsu on January 1, 1960. He played as a central defender for his local club Yamaha Motors during their 1980s glory years, making a total 135 League appearances for the club. He retired in 1992.

== National team career ==
In 1979, Yanagishita selected Japan U-20 national team for 1979 World Youth Championship in Japan. At this competition, he played 3 games.

== Coaching career ==
After the retirement, Yanagishita started coaching career at Yamaha Motors (later Júbilo Iwata) in 1993. He mainly served as assistant coach until 2002. In 2003, he became a manager. Júbilo won the 2nd place in J1 League and the champions in Emperor's Cup with many international players. In 2004, he moved to J2 League club Consadole Sapporo. Consadole finished at bottom place in 2004 and could not be promoted to J1 in 2005 and 2006. He resigned end of 2006 season. In 2007, he returned to Júbilo and served as assistant coach. In 2009, he became a manager again. Although the club results were bad in J1 League, the club won the champions in 2010 J.League Cup. He resigned end of 2011 season. In June 2012, he signed with Albirex Niigata which was at the 17th place of 18 clubs. The club finished at the 15th place and remaining in J1 League. He managed until end of 2015 season. In 2017, he signed with the then-J2 League club Zweigen Kanazawa.

== Managerial statistics ==
Update; December 31, 2018

| Team | From | To | Record | | | | |
| Team | From | To | G | W | D | L | Win % |
|---|---|---|---|---|---|---|---|
| Júbilo Iwata | 2003 | 2003 | 30 | 16 | 9 | 5 | 53.33 |
| Consadole Sapporo | 2004 | 2006 | 136 | 42 | 39 | 55 | 30.88 |
| Júbilo Iwata | 2009 | 2011 | 102 | 35 | 27 | 40 | 34.31 |
| Albirex Niigata | 2012 | 2015 | 123 | 45 | 29 | 49 | 36.59 |
| Zweigen Kanazawa | 2017 | present | 84 | 27 | 23 | 34 | 32.14 |
| Total | | | 475 | 165 | 127 | 183 | 34.74 |
