= 2018 Thespakusatsu Gunma season =

Thespakusatsu Gunma
2018 season
- Manager: Keiichiro Nuno
- Stadium: Shoda Shoyu Stadium Gunma
- J3 League: 5th

2018 Thespakusatsu Gunma season.

== J3 League ==
Match	Date	Team	Score	Team	Venue	Attendance
1	2018.03.11	Fukushima United FC	2-1	Thespakusatsu Gunma	Toho Stadium	2,837
2	2018.03.17	Thespakusatsu Gunma	1-0	Blaublitz Akita	Shoda Shoyu Stadium Gunma	3,802
4	2018.03.25	Thespakusatsu Gunma	0-2	FC Ryukyu	Shoda Shoyu Stadium Gunma	3,085
5	2018.04.01	Grulla Morioka	1-1	Thespakusatsu Gunma	Iwagin Stadium	733
6	2018.04.07	Thespakusatsu Gunma	0-2	Kagoshima United FC	Shoda Shoyu Stadium Gunma	2,486
7	2018.04.15	Thespakusatsu Gunma	2-1	Fujieda MYFC	Shoda Shoyu Stadium Gunma	2,458
8	2018.04.29	Giravanz Kitakyushu	0-1	Thespakusatsu Gunma	Mikuni World Stadium Kitakyushu	5,948
9	2018.05.03	Thespakusatsu Gunma	1-1	SC Sagamihara	Shoda Shoyu Stadium Gunma	3,300
10	2018.05.06	AC Nagano Parceiro	2-2	Thespakusatsu Gunma	Nagano U Stadium	4,667
11	2018.05.20	Thespakusatsu Gunma	4-1	FC Tokyo U-23	Shoda Shoyu Stadium Gunma	3,385
12	2018.06.01	YSCC Yokohama	0-0	Thespakusatsu Gunma	NHK Spring Mitsuzawa Football Stadium	1,228
13	2018.06.09	Thespakusatsu Gunma	1-0	Cerezo Osaka U-23	Shoda Shoyu Stadium Gunma	4,700
14	2018.06.17	Azul Claro Numazu	2-0	Thespakusatsu Gunma	Ashitaka Park Stadium	2,927
16	2018.07.01	Thespakusatsu Gunma	0-1	Kataller Toyama	Shoda Shoyu Stadium Gunma	2,525
18	2018.07.15	Thespakusatsu Gunma	0-1	AC Nagano Parceiro	Shoda Shoyu Stadium Gunma	4,301
19	2018.07.22	Kagoshima United FC	0-2	Thespakusatsu Gunma	Shiranami Stadium	4,108
17	2018.07.28	Gainare Tottori	1-2	Thespakusatsu Gunma	Tottori Bank Bird Stadium	1,511
15	2018.08.18	Gamba Osaka U-23	4-0	Thespakusatsu Gunma	Panasonic Stadium Suita	1,050
20	2018.08.25	FC Tokyo U-23	1-2	Thespakusatsu Gunma	Ajinomoto Field Nishigaoka	1,531
21	2018.09.02	Thespakusatsu Gunma	1-0	Gamba Osaka U-23	Shoda Shoyu Stadium Gunma	3,358
22	2018.09.08	Cerezo Osaka U-23	0-2	Thespakusatsu Gunma	Kincho Stadium	1,192
23	2018.09.16	Kataller Toyama	0-1	Thespakusatsu Gunma	Toyama Stadium	3,162
24	2018.09.21	Thespakusatsu Gunma	0-1	Grulla Morioka	Shoda Shoyu Stadium Gunma	1,604
25	2018.09.30	SC Sagamihara	0-1	Thespakusatsu Gunma	Sagamihara Gion Stadium	1,998
26	2018.10.07	Blaublitz Akita	0-1	Thespakusatsu Gunma	Akigin Stadium	2,211
27	2018.10.14	Thespakusatsu Gunma	2-2	Azul Claro Numazu	Shoda Shoyu Stadium Gunma	2,932
28	2018.10.21	Thespakusatsu Gunma	1-0	Fukushima United FC	Shoda Shoyu Stadium Gunma	4,678
30	2018.11.03	FC Ryukyu	4-2	Thespakusatsu Gunma	Tapic Kenso Hiyagon Stadium	7,810
31	2018.11.11	Thespakusatsu Gunma	3-3	Gainare Tottori	Shoda Shoyu Stadium Gunma	3,030
32	2018.11.18	Thespakusatsu Gunma	1-0	Giravanz Kitakyushu	Shoda Shoyu Stadium Gunma	3,384
33	2018.11.24	Fujieda MYFC	1-0	Thespakusatsu Gunma	Fujieda Soccer Stadium	1,604
34	2018.12.02	Thespakusatsu Gunma	2-2	YSCC Yokohama	Shoda Shoyu Stadium Gunma	4,503
