= 2014 Montedio Yamagata season =

Montedio Yamagata
2014 season
- Manager: Nobuhiro Ishizaki
- Stadium: ND Soft Stadium Yamagata
- J2 League: 6th

2014 Montedio Yamagata season.

== J2 League ==
Match	Date	Team	Score	Team	Venue	Attendance
1	2014.03.02	Shonan Bellmare	1-0	Montedio Yamagata	Shonan BMW Stadium Hiratsuka	7,234
2	2014.03.09	Consadole Sapporo	1-1	Montedio Yamagata	Sapporo Dome	16,064
3	2014.03.16	Montedio Yamagata	3-1	FC Gifu	ND Soft Stadium Yamagata	7,038
4	2014.03.22	Yokohama FC	2-1	Montedio Yamagata	NHK Spring Mitsuzawa Football Stadium	4,700
5	2014.03.30	Montedio Yamagata	0-0	Mito HollyHock	ND Soft Stadium Yamagata	4,270
6	2014.04.05	Montedio Yamagata	2-0	Ehime FC	ND Soft Stadium Yamagata	4,371
7	2014.04.13	Kyoto Sanga FC	2-2	Montedio Yamagata	Kyoto Nishikyogoku Athletic Stadium	6,565
8	2014.04.20	Montedio Yamagata	1-2	Roasso Kumamoto	ND Soft Stadium Yamagata	5,766
9	2014.04.26	Giravanz Kitakyushu	0-1	Montedio Yamagata	Honjo Stadium	3,367
10	2014.04.29	Montedio Yamagata	0-2	Fagiano Okayama	ND Soft Stadium Yamagata	5,283
11	2014.05.03	Montedio Yamagata	1-0	Kataller Toyama	ND Soft Stadium Yamagata	6,430
12	2014.05.06	Thespakusatsu Gunma	1-1	Montedio Yamagata	Shoda Shoyu Stadium Gunma	2,787
13	2014.05.11	Montedio Yamagata	1-1	JEF United Chiba	ND Soft Stadium Yamagata	5,812
14	2014.05.18	Montedio Yamagata	0-0	Matsumoto Yamaga FC	ND Soft Stadium Yamagata	6,276
15	2014.05.24	Avispa Fukuoka	0-1	Montedio Yamagata	Level5 Stadium	3,583
16	2014.05.31	Oita Trinita	1-0	Montedio Yamagata	Oita Bank Dome	5,824
17	2014.06.07	Montedio Yamagata	6-1	Tochigi SC	ND Soft Stadium Yamagata	4,295
18	2014.06.14	V-Varen Nagasaki	0-0	Montedio Yamagata	Nagasaki Stadium	3,819
19	2014.06.21	Kamatamare Sanuki	0-3	Montedio Yamagata	Kagawa Marugame Stadium	1,921
20	2014.06.28	Montedio Yamagata	0-1	Júbilo Iwata	ND Soft Stadium Yamagata	12,030
21	2014.07.05	Tokyo Verdy	1-2	Montedio Yamagata	Ajinomoto Stadium	4,944
22	2014.07.20	Montedio Yamagata	1-2	Giravanz Kitakyushu	ND Soft Stadium Yamagata	6,107
23	2014.07.26	Montedio Yamagata	1-2	Thespakusatsu Gunma	ND Soft Stadium Yamagata	5,471
24	2014.07.30	JEF United Chiba	2-0	Montedio Yamagata	Fukuda Denshi Arena	8,149
25	2014.08.03	Montedio Yamagata	2-0	Oita Trinita	ND Soft Stadium Yamagata	4,430
26	2014.08.10	Kataller Toyama	1-1	Montedio Yamagata	Toyama Stadium	2,983
27	2014.08.17	Montedio Yamagata	2-1	Consadole Sapporo	ND Soft Stadium Yamagata	6,402
28	2014.08.24	Matsumoto Yamaga FC	0-0	Montedio Yamagata	Matsumotodaira Park Stadium	12,042
29	2014.08.31	Montedio Yamagata	1-3	Shonan Bellmare	ND Soft Stadium Yamagata	6,495
30	2014.09.06	Mito HollyHock	0-1	Montedio Yamagata	K's denki Stadium Mito	4,449
31	2014.09.14	Ehime FC	4-0	Montedio Yamagata	Ningineer Stadium	4,209
32	2014.09.20	Montedio Yamagata	1-0	Kyoto Sanga FC	ND Soft Stadium Yamagata	4,675
33	2014.09.23	Tochigi SC	1-1	Montedio Yamagata	Tochigi Green Stadium	4,428
34	2014.09.28	Montedio Yamagata	4-0	Kamatamare Sanuki	ND Soft Stadium Yamagata	6,104
35	2014.10.04	FC Gifu	1-0	Montedio Yamagata	Gifu Nagaragawa Stadium	5,512
36	2014.10.11	Montedio Yamagata	2-1	V-Varen Nagasaki	ND Soft Stadium Yamagata	5,406
37	2014.10.19	Fagiano Okayama	1-4	Montedio Yamagata	Kanko Stadium	7,826
38	2014.10.26	Montedio Yamagata	2-4	Yokohama FC	ND Soft Stadium Yamagata	7,414
39	2014.11.01	Roasso Kumamoto	1-3	Montedio Yamagata	Umakana-Yokana Stadium	7,751
40	2014.11.09	Montedio Yamagata	2-1	Avispa Fukuoka	ND Soft Stadium Yamagata	5,897
41	2014.11.15	Júbilo Iwata	0-2	Montedio Yamagata	Yamaha Stadium	8,716
42	2014.11.23	Montedio Yamagata	1-2	Tokyo Verdy	ND Soft Stadium Yamagata	13,344
