= Hitoshi Morishita (footballer, born 1967) =

Japanese footballer and manager (1967–2025)

Hitoshi Morishita 森下仁之
Personal information
- Date of birth: December 9, 1967
- Place of birth: Hamamatsu, Shizuoka, Japan
- Date of death: June 25, 2025 (aged 57)
- Height: 1.70 m (5 ft 7 in)
- Position: Midfielder

Youth career
- 1983–1985: Hamana High School
- 1986: Kokushikan University

Senior career*
Years	Team	Apps	(Gls)
1987–1996	Tosu Futures		

Managerial career
- 2012–2016: Zweigen Kanazawa
- 2018: Giravanz Kitakyushu
- * Club domestic league appearances and goals

Hitoshi Morishita (森下 仁之, Morishita Hitoshi; December 9, 1967 – June 25, 2025) was a Japanese football player and manager.

== Playing career ==
Morishita was born in Hamamatsu on December 9, 1967. After dropping out of Kokushikan University, he joined Tosu Futures which started in 1987. In 1996, he retired.

== Coaching career ==
Morishita worked with youth formations of Consadole Sapporo and Júbilo Iwata before entering in the staff of Avispa Fukuoka. He coached Zweigen Kanazawa beginning in 2012 and he won the first edition of J3 League in 2014, conquering the promotion to the J2 League. In 2018, he signed with J3 League club Giravanz Kitakyushu. However, he was sacked for poor results in June 2018 when the club was in last place among 22 clubs.

== Death ==
Morishita died on June 25, 2025, at the age of 57.

== Managerial statistics ==
Team	From	To	Record				
Team	From	To	G	W	D	L	Win %
Zweigen Kanazawa	2014	2016	117	43	39	35	36.75
Giravanz Kitakyushu	2018	2018	13	2	2	9	15.38
Total			130	45	41	44	34.62
