= Ishikawa Athletics Stadium =

Athletic stadium in Kanazawa, Japan

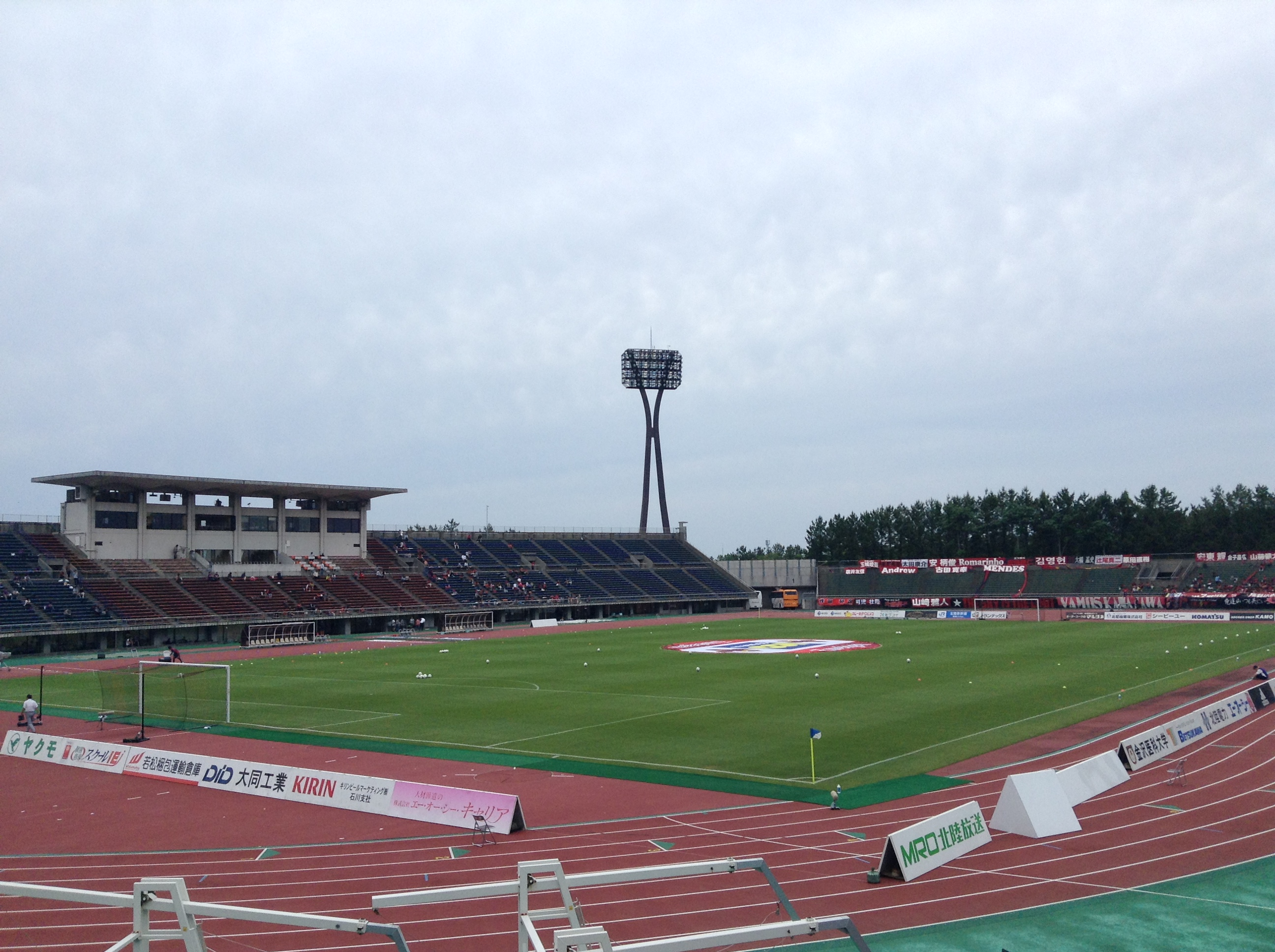

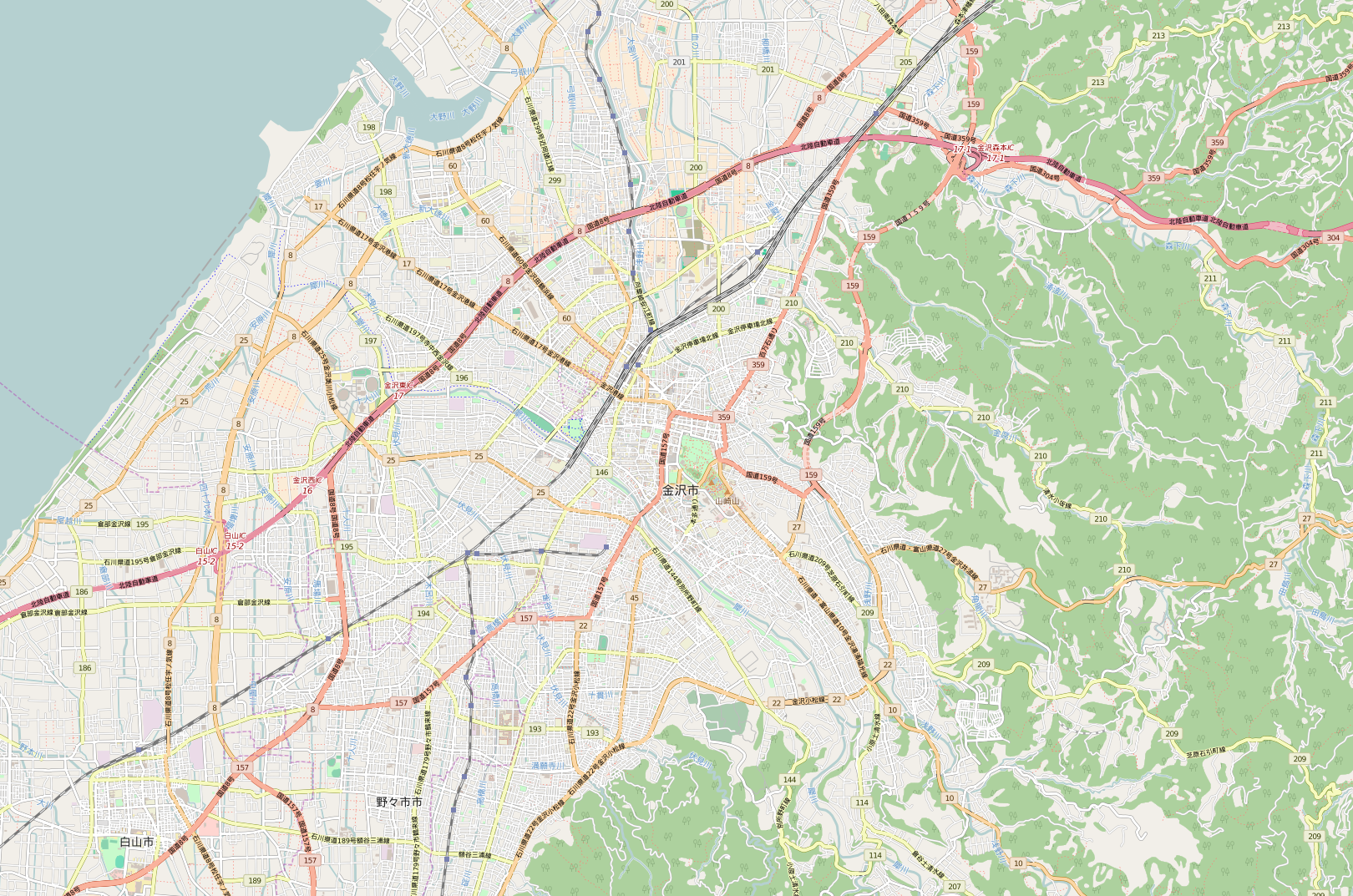
- Location within Kanazawa, Ishikawa Location within Ishikawa Prefecture Location within Japan
- Interactive map of Ishikawa Athletics Stadium
- Location: Kanazawa, Ishikawa, Japan
- Coordinates: 36°34′33″N 136°36′19″E
- Owner: Ishikawa Prefecture
- Capacity: 20,261

Construction
- Opened: April 1974

Tenant
- Zweigen Kanazawa (1974–2024)

Ishikawa Athletics Stadium (石川県西部緑地公園陸上競技場, Ishikawa-ken Seibu Ryokuchi-kōen Rikujōkyōgijō) is an athletic stadium in Kanazawa, Ishikawa, Japan.

Ishikawa Prefecture Seibu Ryokuchi Park Athletic Stadium is an athletic stadium located in Seibu Ryokuchi Park in Kanazawa, Ishikawa Prefecture, Japan. It is also used as a ball game field. The facility is owned by Ishikawa Prefecture and is operated and managed by the Ishikawa Prefectural Fureai Public Corporation as a designated manager.

== Major events and competitions ==
Athletics

- Ishikawa Athletics Championships
- Ishikawa Prefectural High School Track and Field Championships
- All Japan Junior High School Correspondence Track and Field Tournament Ishikawa Prefecture

Soccer

- Zweigen Kanazawa (J2) home games
- Gamba Osaka official match (until 2010)
- Emperor's Cup All Japan Football Championship

Rugby football

- Japan Rugby Top League

Others

- All Japan High School Athletic Conference (1985)
- The 46th National Sports Festival (1991)

== Facility overview ==
- Japan Athletics Federation Class 1 Official Recognition
- Track 400m × 9 lanes
- Natural grass pitch
- Large-scale video equipment
- Night skiing lighting equipment: 4

== Access ==
Bus

- JR Hokuriku Main Line-Kanazawa Station West Exit Bus Terminal No. 2From the Hokuriku Railway bus "Shimoyasuhara" bound for "Fukurohata Seibu Ryokuchi Koen-mae", get off at "Fukurohata West Ryokuchi Koen-mae" and walk 5 minutes
- JR Hokuriku Main Line-Kanazawa Station East Exit Bus Terminal No. 11From the Hokuriku Railway bus "Saiseikai Hospital"Bound for "Saiseikai Hospital"Get off at "Seibu Ryokuchi Park", walk 2 minutes

Automotive

- About 15 minutes from JR Hokuriku Main Line / Kanazawa Station
- Hokuriku Expressway-Kanazawa Nishi IC3-5 minutes(2 km).

Others

- Zweigen operates a paid shuttle bus from Kanazawa Station Kanazawa Port Exit (West Exit) during home games.

Visit Zweigen website for further information
