= 1997 Kashiwa Reysol season =

Kashiwa Reysol
1997 season
- Manager: Nicanor
- Stadium: Hitachi Kashiwa Soccer Stadium
- J.League: 5th
- Emperor's Cup: 4th Round
- J.League Cup: Semifinals
- Top goalscorer: Edílson (23)
| Home colours | Away colours |

1997 Kashiwa Reysol season

== Competitions ==
| Competitions | Position |
|---|---|
| J.League | 7th / 17 clubs |
| Emperor's Cup | Quarterfinals |
| J.League Cup | Quarterfinals |

== Domestic results ==
=== J.League ===
| 12 April 1997 1-1 | Kashiwa Reysol | 0-1 | Shimizu S-Pulse | Tokyo National Stadium |
| JST (UTC+09) |

| 16 April 1997 1-2 | Sanfrecce Hiroshima | 2-3 | Kashiwa Reysol | Hiroshima Big Arch |
| JST (UTC+09) |

| 19 April 1997 1-3 | Kashiwa Reysol | 2-1 | Avispa Fukuoka | Hitachi Kashiwa Soccer Stadium |
| JST (UTC+09) |

| 23 April 1997 1-4 | Cerezo Osaka | 2-2 (GG) (a.e.t.) (5-4 p) | Kashiwa Reysol | Osaka Nagai Stadium |
| JST (UTC+09) |

| 26 April 1997 1-5 | Kashiwa Reysol | 3-1 | Vissel Kobe | Hitachi Kashiwa Soccer Stadium |
| JST (UTC+09) |

| 3 May 1997 1-6 | Kashima Antlers | 0-4 | Kashiwa Reysol | Tokyo National Stadium |
| JST (UTC+09) |

| 7 May 1997 1-7 | Kashiwa Reysol | 1-0 | Nagoya Grampus Eight | Hitachi Kashiwa Soccer Stadium |
| JST (UTC+09) |

| 10 May 1997 1-8 | Yokohama Flügels | 2-0 | Kashiwa Reysol | Tokyo National Stadium |
| JST (UTC+09) |

| 17 May 1997 1-9 | Kashiwa Reysol | 2-1 | Júbilo Iwata | Hitachi Kashiwa Soccer Stadium |
| JST (UTC+09) |

| 1-10 | bye |

| 28 May 1997 1-11 | Urawa Red Diamonds | 3-2 (GG) (a.e.t.) | Kashiwa Reysol | Urawa Komaba Stadium |
| JST (UTC+09) |

| 31 May 1997 1-12 | Kashiwa Reysol | 4-1 | Gamba Osaka | Hitachi Kashiwa Soccer Stadium |
| JST (UTC+09) |

| 5 July 1997 1-13 | Verdy Kawasaki | 1-3 | Kashiwa Reysol | Todoroki Athletics Stadium |
| JST (UTC+09) |

| 9 July 1997 1-14 | Kashiwa Reysol | 3-2 (GG) (a.e.t.) | Kyoto Purple Sanga | Hitachi Kashiwa Soccer Stadium |
| JST (UTC+09) |

| 12 July 1997 1-15 | JEF United Ichihara | 1-0 | Kashiwa Reysol | Ichihara Seaside Stadium |
| JST (UTC+09) |

| 16 July 1997 1-16 | Kashiwa Reysol | 2-0 | Bellmare Hiratsuka | Hitachi Kashiwa Soccer Stadium |
| JST (UTC+09) |

| 19 July 1997 1-17 | Yokohama Marinos | 0-3 | Kashiwa Reysol | Yokohama Mitsuzawa Stadium |
| JST (UTC+09) |

| 30 July 1997 2-1 | Bellmare Hiratsuka | 7-4 | Kashiwa Reysol | Hiratsuka Athletics Stadium |
| JST (UTC+09) |

| 2 August 1997 2-2 | Shimizu S-Pulse | 2-3 (GG) (a.e.t.) | Kashiwa Reysol | Nihondaira Sports Stadium |
| JST (UTC+09) |

| 6 August 1997 2-3 | Kashiwa Reysol | 2-1 | Sanfrecce Hiroshima | Hitachi Kashiwa Soccer Stadium |
| JST (UTC+09) |

| 9 August 1997 2-4 | Avispa Fukuoka | 1-1 (GG) (a.e.t.) (5-3 p) | Kashiwa Reysol | Hakatanomori Football Stadium |
| JST (UTC+09) |

| 16 August 1997 2-5 | Kashiwa Reysol | 0-1 | Cerezo Osaka | Hitachi Kashiwa Soccer Stadium |
| JST (UTC+09) |

| 20 August 1997 2-6 | Vissel Kobe | 2-4 | Kashiwa Reysol | Kobe Universiade Memorial Stadium |
| JST (UTC+09) |

| 23 August 1997 2-7 | Kashiwa Reysol | 3-5 | Kashima Antlers | Hitachi Kashiwa Soccer Stadium |
| JST (UTC+09) |

| 30 August 1997 2-8 | Nagoya Grampus Eight | 1-0 | Kashiwa Reysol | Mizuho Athletic Stadium |
| JST (UTC+09) |

| 3 September 1997 2-9 | Kashiwa Reysol | 0-2 | Yokohama Flügels | Hitachi Kashiwa Soccer Stadium |
| JST (UTC+09) |

| 6 September 1997 2-10 | Júbilo Iwata | 2-1 | Kashiwa Reysol | Júbilo Iwata Stadium |
| JST (UTC+09) |

| 10 September 1997 2-11 | Kashiwa Reysol | 1-2 | JEF United Ichihara | Hitachi Kashiwa Soccer Stadium |
| JST (UTC+09) |

| 2-12 | bye |

| 20 September 1997 2-13 | Gamba Osaka | 1-2 | Kashiwa Reysol | Osaka Expo '70 Stadium |
| JST (UTC+09) |

| 24 September 1997 2-14 | Kashiwa Reysol | 3-0 | Urawa Red Diamonds | Hitachi Kashiwa Soccer Stadium |
| JST (UTC+09) |

| 27 September 1997 2-15 | Kashiwa Reysol | 2-1 | Verdy Kawasaki | Hitachi Kashiwa Soccer Stadium |
| JST (UTC+09) |

| 1 October 1997 2-16 | Kyoto Purple Sanga | 0-1 | Kashiwa Reysol | Nishikyogoku Athletic Stadium |
| JST (UTC+09) |

| 4 October 1997 2-17 | Kashiwa Reysol | 2-3 | Yokohama Marinos | Hitachi Kashiwa Soccer Stadium |
| JST (UTC+09) |

=== Emperor's Cup ===
| 1st Round | bye |

| 2nd Round | bye |

| 14 December 1997 3rd Round | Kashiwa Reysol | 4-1 | Kokushikan University | Hitachi Kashiwa Soccer Stadium |
| JST (UTC+09) |

| 20 December 1997 4th Round | Kashiwa Reysol | 2-1 | Vissel Kobe | Hitachi Kashiwa Soccer Stadium |
| JST (UTC+09) |

| 23 December 1997 Quarterfinals | Kashiwa Reysol | 1-2 | Júbilo Iwata | Osaka Nagai Stadium |
| JST (UTC+09) |

=== J.League Cup ===
| 8 March 1997 GL-D-1 | Kashiwa Reysol | 5-1 | Vissel Kobe | Hitachi Kashiwa Soccer Stadium |
| JST (UTC+09) |

| 15 March 1997 GL-D-2 | Sanfrecce Hiroshima | 0-2 | Kashiwa Reysol | Hiroshima Big Arch |
| JST (UTC+09) |

| 19 March 1997 GL-D-3 | Nagoya Grampus Eight | 1-1 | Kashiwa Reysol | Mizuho Athletic Stadium |
| JST (UTC+09) |

| 22 March 1997 GL-D-4 | Kashiwa Reysol | 3-0 | Sanfrecce Hiroshima | Hitachi Kashiwa Soccer Stadium |
| JST (UTC+09) |

| 26 March 1997 GL-D-5 | Kashiwa Reysol | 1-1 | Nagoya Grampus Eight | Hitachi Kashiwa Soccer Stadium |
| JST (UTC+09) |

| 29 March 1997 GL-D-6 | Vissel Kobe | 2-1 | Kashiwa Reysol | Kobe Universiade Memorial Stadium |
| JST (UTC+09) |

| 15 October 1997 Quarterfinals-1 | Yokohama Flügels | 0-1 | Kashiwa Reysol | Yokohama Mitsuzawa Stadium |
| JST (UTC+09) |

| 18 October 1997 Quarterfinals-2 | Kashiwa Reysol | 0-3 (1-3 agg.) | Yokohama Flügels | Hitachi Kashiwa Soccer Stadium |
| JST (UTC+09) |

== Player statistics ==
| No. | Pos. | Nat. | Player | D.o.B. (Age) | Height / Weight | J.League | | Emperor's Cup | | J.League Cup | | Total | |
| No. | Pos. | Nat. | Player | D.o.B. (Age) | Height / Weight | Apps | Goals | Apps | Goals | Apps | Goals | Apps | Goals |
|---|---|---|---|---|---|---|---|---|---|---|---|---|---|
| 1 | GK | (Japan) | Yoichi Doi | July 25, 1973 (aged 23) | 183 cm / 78 kg | 19 | 0 | 3 | 0 | 8 | 0 | 30 | 0 |
| 2 | DF | (Japan) | Kentaro Sawada | May 15, 1970 (aged 26) | 170 cm / 62 kg | 30 | 0 | 3 | 0 | 8 | 0 | 41 | 0 |
| 3 | DF | (Brazil) | Antônio | May 18, 1969 (aged 27) | 187 cm / 78 kg | 0 | 0 | 0 | 0 | 6 | 0 | 6 | 0 |
| 4 | DF | (Japan) | Takeshi Watanabe | September 10, 1972 (aged 24) | 181 cm / 76 kg | 30 | 3 | 3 | 0 | 8 | 1 | 41 | 4 |
| 5 | MF | (Japan) | Takahiro Shimotaira | December 18, 1971 (aged 25) | 174 cm / 67 kg | 24 | 0 | 3 | 0 | 6 | 0 | 33 | 0 |
| 6 | MF | (Brazil) | Valdir | October 25, 1965 (aged 31) | 172 cm / 66 kg | 24 | 1 | 3 | 0 | 2 | 0 | 29 | 1 |
| 7 | MF | (Japan) | Naoki Sakai | August 2, 1975 (aged 21) | 176 cm / 63 kg | 14 | 0 | 3 | 1 | 6 | 0 | 23 | 1 |
| 8 | MF/DF | (Japan) | Yuji Yokoyama | July 6, 1969 (aged 27) | 177 cm / 70 kg | 16 | 2 | 0 | 0 | 1 | 0 | 17 | 2 |
| 9 | FW/MF | (Brazil) | Jamelli | July 22, 1974 (aged 22) | 178 cm / 70 kg | 28 | 14 | 2 | 1 | 7 | 1 | 37 | 16 |
| 10 | FW | (Brazil) | Edílson | September 17, 1970 (aged 26) | 167 cm / 60 kg | 25 | 23 | 0 | 0 | 6 | 8 | 31 | 31 |
| 11 | MF | (Japan) | Nozomu Kato | October 7, 1969 (aged 27) | 170 cm / 64 kg | 32 | 4 | 3 | 1 | 8 | 1 | 43 | 6 |
| 12 | DF | (Japan) | Takumi Morikawa | July 11, 1977 (aged 19) | 171 cm / 67 kg | 0 | 0 | | 0 | 0 | 0 | | 0 |
| 13 | DF | (Japan) | Michihisa Date | August 22, 1966 (aged 30) | 180 cm / 72 kg | 13 | 0 | 2 | 1 | 0 | 0 | 15 | 1 |
| 14 | MF | (Japan) | Shin Tanada | July 25, 1969 (aged 27) | 165 cm / 58 kg | 18 | 2 | 2 | 0 | 5 | 1 | 25 | 3 |
| 15 | DF | (Japan) | Kentaro Ishikawa | February 12, 1970 (aged 27) | 181 cm / 72 kg | 12 | 1 | 1 | 0 | 5 | 0 | 18 | 1 |
| 16 | MF | (Japan) | Mitsuteru Watanabe | April 10, 1974 (aged 22) | 177 cm / 67 kg | 1 | 0 | 0 | 0 | 0 | 0 | 1 | 0 |
| 17 | MF | (Japan) | Tomokazu Myojin | January 24, 1978 (aged 19) | 173 cm / 66 kg | 13 | 1 | 1 | 0 | 6 | 0 | 20 | 1 |
| 18 | DF | (Japan) | Tomohiro Katanosaka | April 18, 1971 (aged 25) | 171 cm / 68 kg | 25 | 2 | 3 | 1 | 8 | 1 | 36 | 4 |
| 19 | FW | (Japan) | Kenji Arima | November 26, 1972 (aged 24) | 180 cm / 72 kg | 5 | 0 | 0 | 0 | 5 | 1 | 10 | 1 |
| 20 | MF | (Japan) | Takashi Kojima | August 4, 1973 (aged 23) | 178 cm / 68 kg | 0 | 0 | 3 | 0 | 1 | 0 | 4 | 0 |
| 21 | MF | (Japan) | Tomonori Hirayama | January 9, 1978 (aged 19) | 173 cm / 62 kg | 0 | 0 | | 0 | 0 | 0 | | 0 |
| 22 | MF | (Japan) | Makoto Sunakawa | August 10, 1977 (aged 19) | 172 cm / 67 kg | 0 | 0 | | 0 | 0 | 0 | | 0 |
| 23 | GK | (Japan) | Ryuji Kato | December 24, 1969 (aged 27) | 184 cm / 78 kg | 10 | 0 | 0 | 0 | 0 | 0 | 10 | 0 |
| 24 | MF | (Japan) | Harutaka Ono | May 12, 1978 (aged 18) | 173 cm / 69 kg | 7 | 0 | 0 | 0 | 0 | 0 | 7 | 0 |
| 25 | FW | (Japan) | Hideaki Kitajima | May 23, 1978 (aged 18) | 182 cm / 75 kg | 6 | 0 | 0 | 0 | 0 | 0 | 6 | 0 |
| 26 | GK | (Japan) | Dai Sato | August 16, 1971 (aged 25) | 190 cm / 86 kg | 3 | 0 | 0 | 0 | 0 | 0 | 3 | 0 |
| 27 | DF | (Japan) | Shigenori Hagimura | July 31, 1976 (aged 20) | 183 cm / 75 kg | 32 | 1 | 0 | 0 | 3 | 0 | 35 | 1 |
| 28 | MF | (Japan) | Shinya Yabusaki | June 1, 1978 (aged 18) | 176 cm / 65 kg | 0 | 0 | | 0 | 0 | 0 | | 0 |
| 29 | DF | (Japan) | Toru Irie | July 8, 1977 (aged 19) | 177 cm / 63 kg | 0 | 0 | | 0 | 0 | 0 | | 0 |
| 30 | FW | (Japan) | Hitoshi Kawashima | August 4, 1977 (aged 19) | 190 cm / 80 kg | 0 | 0 | | 0 | 0 | 0 | | 0 |
| 31 | GK | (Japan) | Motohiro Yoshida | August 25, 1974 (aged 22) | 184 cm / 79 kg | 0 | 0 | | 0 | 0 | 0 | | 0 |
| 32 | FW | (Brazil) | Silva † | July 19, 1975 (aged 21) | -cm / -kg | 12 | 8 | 3 | 2 | 2 | 0 | 17 | 10 |
| 33 | DF | (Japan) | Kensuke Nebiki † | September 7, 1977 (aged 19) | -cm / -kg | 0 | 0 | | 0 | 0 | 0 | | 0 |

- † player(s) joined the team after the opening of this season.

== Transfers ==
In:

| No. | Pos. | Nation | Player |
|---|---|---|---|
| 31 | GK | JPN | Motohiro Yoshida (from Keio University) |
| 27 | DF | JPN | Shigenori Hagimura (from University of Tsukuba) |
| 16 | MF | JPN | Mitsuteru Watanabe (from Waseda University) |
| 24 | MF | JPN | Harutaka Ono (from Maebashi Commercial High School) |
| 28 | MF | JPN | Shinya Yabusaki (from Narashino High School) |
| 9 | FW | BRA | Paulo Roberto Jamelli Júnior (from Santos FC) |
| 25 | FW | JPN | Hideaki Kitajima (from Funabashi municipal High School) |
| 30 | FW | JPN | Hitoshi Kawashima (from Tohoku High School) |

Out:

| No. | Pos. | Nation | Player |
|---|---|---|---|
| — | GK | JPN | Takeaki Yuhara (to Sagan Tosu) |
| — | DF | JPN | Kenji Oba (to Kawasaki Frontale) |
| — | DF | JPN | Nobutaka Tanaka |
| — | DF | JPN | Kensuke Nebiki |
| — | MF | JPN | Satoshi Oishi |
| — | MF | JPN | Tatsuma Yoshida (to Kyoto Purple Sanga) |
| — | MF | JPN | Yoshikazu Kawashima |
| — | MF | JPN | Kazumasa Nabeta (to Hitachi Shimizu) |
| — | FW | BRA | Careca |
| — | FW | JPN | Koichi Hashiratani (retired) |
| — | FW | BRA | Wagner (to São José) |
| — | FW | JPN | Kenichi Sugano (to Kawasaki Frontale) |
| — | FW | JPN | Hiroaki Hotta |

== Transfers during the season ==
=== In ===
- (Brazil) Elpídio Pereira da Silva Filho (from Atlético Mineiro on May)
- (Japan) Kensuke Nebiki (loan return from Independiente)

=== Out ===
- (Brazil) Antônio (on April)
- (Brazil) Edílson (on October)
- (Japan) Takumi Morikawa (loan to a Brazilian club on December)

== Awards ==
none

== Other pages ==
- (in Japanese) J. League official site
- (in Japanese) Kashiwa Reysol official site
