= 1995 Kashiwa Reysol season =

Kashiwa Reysol
1995 season
- Manager: Zé Sérgio; Antoninho (from 11 August 1995)
- Stadium: Kashiwa Hitachi Stadium
- J.League: 12th
- Emperor's Cup: 2nd Round
- Top goalscorer: League: Shin Tanada (16); All: Shin Tanada (16)
- Highest home attendance: 15,865 (vs Bellmare Hiratsuka, 26 August 1995); 46,294 (vs Verdy Kawasaki, 10 May 1995, Tokyo National Stadium)
- Lowest home attendance: 10,038 (vs Gamba Osaka, 4 October 1995)
- Average home league attendance: 16,102
Home colours	Away colours

1995 Kashiwa Reysol season

== Review and events ==
=== League results summary ===
Overall								Home						Away					
Pld	W	D	L	GF	GA	GD	Pts	W	D	L	GF	GA	GD	W	D	L	GF	GA	GD
52	21	0	31	87	100	−13	65	9	0	17	46	54	−8	12	0	14	41	46	−5

Source: J.LEAGUE OFFICIAL RECORD & DATA 1996. ISBN 4-09-102323-1.

=== League results by round ===
J.League Suntory series (first stage)
Round	1	2	3	4	5	6	7	8	9	10	11	12	13	14	15	16	17	18	19	20	21	22	23	24	25	26
Ground	A	H	A	H	A	A	H	H	A	H	A	A	H	A	H	A	H	H	A	A	H	A	H	H	A	H
Result	L	L	W	W	L	W	L	L	L	L	L	W	L	L	L	W	L	L	W	L	L	L	L	L	L	W
Position	10	14	9	8	11	8	10	10	11	10	13	11	13	14	14	13	14	14	14	14	14	14	14	14	14	14

Source: J.LEAGUE OFFICIAL RECORD & DATA 1996. ISBN 4-09-102323-1.
A = Away; H = Home; W = Win; D = Draw; L = Loss

J.League NICOS series (second stage)
Round	1	2	3	4	5	6	7	8	9	10	11	12	13	14	15	16	17	18	19	20	21	22	23	24	25	26
Ground	A	A	H	A	H	A	H	H	A	A	H	A	H	H	A	H	A	H	A	A	H	H	A	H	A	H
Result	L	W	W	W	W	W	L	L	W	L	L	L	L	L	L	L	W	W	W	L	W	L	L	W	W	W
Position	8	6	6	2	2	2	4	5	4	5	8	8	9	6	7	10	9	7	7	7	7	7	9	8	6	5

Source: J.LEAGUE OFFICIAL RECORD & DATA 1996. ISBN 4-09-102323-1.
A = Away; H = Home; W = Win; D = Draw; L = Loss

== Competitions ==
Competitions	Position
J.League	12th / 14 clubs
Emperor's Cup	2nd round

== Domestic results ==
=== J.League ===
18 March 1995 1st-1	Shimizu S-Pulse	3–2 (V-goal) (a.e.t.)	Kashiwa Reysol	Kusanagi Athletic Stadium
15:03 JST (UTC+09)	Toninho 37'; Hasegawa 67'; Dias 100'	J. League	Ōkura 24'; 29' (o.g.)	Attendance: 18,017; Referee: Yōtarō Moritsu; Assistant referees: Naoyuki Mori, Mikio Fukuoka; Fourth official: Naoki Uchiyama

22 March 1995 1st-2	Kashiwa Reysol	0–1	Kashima Antlers	Tokyo National Stadium
19:04 JST (UTC+09)		J. League	Kurosaki 24'	Attendance: 42,994; Referee: Juan Carlos Crespi; Assistant referees: Hiroshi Fukuda, Kazuaki Hamaguchi; Fourth official: Yoshikazu Ozaki

25 March 1995 1st-3	Verdy Kawasaki	0–1	Kashiwa Reysol	Toyama Stadium
19:04 JST (UTC+09)		J. League	Müller 13'	Attendance: 22,349; Referee: Armando Perez; Assistant referees: Tatsumi Ōno, Kōji Taniuchi; Fourth official: Atsushi Tanaka; Man of the Match: Müller

29 March 1995 1st-4	Kashiwa Reysol	2–1 (V-goal) (a.e.t.)	Yokohama Flügels	Kashiwa Hitachi Stadium
19:03 JST (UTC+09)	Müller 57' 99'	J. League	Hirakawa 23'	Attendance: 15,114; Referee: Lutz Fröhlich; Assistant referees: Hiroshi Fukuda, Akihisa Makino; Fourth official: Fujirō Masukura; Man of the Match: Müller

1 April 1995 1st-5	JEF United Ichihara	1–0 (V-goal) (a.e.t.)	Kashiwa Reysol	Ichihara Stadium
15:05 JST (UTC+09)	Vasilijević 119'	J. League		Attendance: 14,079; Referee: Yoshitsugu Katayama; Assistant referees: Noboru Ishiyama, Kō Ōishi; Fourth official: Kaoru Nagase

5 April 1995 1st-6	Nagoya Grampus Eight	1–4	Kashiwa Reysol	Nagoya Mizuho Athletics Stadium
19:01 JST (UTC+09)	Okayama 76'	J. League	Müller 6'; N. Katō 65', 89'; Careca 87'	Attendance: 18,819; Referee: Juan Carlos Crespi; Assistant referees: Kazuhisa Osada, Naoyuki Mori; Fourth official: Takao Wakahara; Man of the Match: Nozomu Katō

8 April 1995 1st-7	Kashiwa Reysol	2–4	Gamba Osaka	Kashiwa Hitachi Stadium
14:59 JST (UTC+09)	Tanada 10'; Müller 44'	J. League	Protassov 22'; Y. Matsuyama 41'; Gillhaus 44', 61'	Attendance: 14,450; Referee: Keiichi Sunakawa; Assistant referees: Takeshi Ōkura, Ichirō Inukai; Fourth official: Masahiko Tsuma

12 April 1995 1st-8	Kashiwa Reysol	0–1 (V-goal) (a.e.t.)	Júbilo Iwata	Kashiwa Hitachi Stadium
19:03 JST (UTC+09)		J. League	Nanami 92'	Attendance: 13,789; Referee: Yoshimi Ogawa; Assistant referees: Masahiro Katagiri, Kōji Taniuchi; Fourth official: Atsushi Nakamura

15 April 1995 1st-9	Urawa Red Diamonds	4–0	Kashiwa Reysol	Omiya Football Stadium
14:59 JST (UTC+09)	Bein 22', 47' (pen.); Fukuda 37'; Buchwald 58'	J. League		Attendance: 9,759; Referee: Juan Carlos Crespi; Assistant referees: Tetsu Karakida, Takayoshi Kashino; Fourth official: Toshimitsu Yasumoto

22 April 1995 1st-10	Kashiwa Reysol	1–2 (V-goal) (a.e.t.)	Bellmare Hiratsuka	Kashiwa Hitachi Stadium
15:01 JST (UTC+09)	Ishikawa 63'	J. League	Betinho 23' 100' (pen.)	Attendance: 13,413; Referee: Armando Perez; Assistant referees: Hiroshi Fukuda, Kō Ōishi; Fourth official: Katsuhiko Takayama

26 April 1995 1st-11	Yokohama Marinos	1–0	Kashiwa Reysol	Tokyo National Stadium
19:01 JST (UTC+09)	Medina Bello 26'	J. League		Attendance: 51,725; Referee: Hiroyuki Umemoto; Assistant referees: Kazuaki Hamaguchi, Hisaharu Kitamura; Fourth official: Yoshikazu Ozaki

29 April 1995 1st-12	Cerezo Osaka	1–2	Kashiwa Reysol	Osaka Nagai No.2 Stadium
15:00 JST (UTC+09)	Marquinhos 84'	J. League	Shimotaira 69'; N. Katō 71'	Attendance: 13,109; Referee: Yoshitsugu Katayama; Assistant referees: Morihisa Yamaguchi, Mitsuyoshi Nakaguma; Fourth official: Tsuyoshi Miyake; Man of the Match: Kōichi Hashiratani

3 May 1995 1st-13	Kashiwa Reysol	1–2	Sanfrecce Hiroshima	Niigata Stadium
19:04 JST (UTC+09)	Ōba 39'	J. League	Ōki 66'; Huistra 83'	Attendance: 14,723; Referee: Fumikazu Shioyazono; Assistant referees: Yū Nakamura, Kimio Izaki; Fourth official: Masaaki Shimomura

6 May 1995 1st-14	Kashima Antlers	4–0	Kashiwa Reysol	Kashima Soccer Stadium
16:04 JST (UTC+09)	Kurosaki 11'; Hasegawa 15', 44'; Leonardo 70'	J. League		Attendance: 15,816; Referee: Hideo Kikuchi; Assistant referees: Tetsu Karakida, Akihisa Makino; Fourth official: Takao Onshi

10 May 1995 1st-15	Kashiwa Reysol	0–1	Verdy Kawasaki	Tokyo National Stadium
19:03 JST (UTC+09)		J. League	Kitazawa 44'	Attendance: 46,294; Referee: Naotsugu Fuse; Assistant referees: Hitoshi Yamada, Hisaharu Kitamura; Fourth official: Masao Yamanaka

13 May 1995 1st-16	Yokohama Flügels	0–1	Kashiwa Reysol	Nagasaki Stadium
14:03 JST (UTC+09)		J. League	N. Katō 44' (pen.)	Attendance: 11,994; Referee: Masayoshi Okada; Assistant referees: Hideaki Harada, Hiroyuki Izumi; Fourth official: Shigehisa Yamaguchi; Man of the Match: Takeshi Watanabe

17 June 1995 1st-17	Kashiwa Reysol	0–3	JEF United Ichihara	Kashiwa Hitachi Stadium
19:03 JST (UTC+09)		J. League	Rufer 0'; Ejiri 41'; Vasilijević 69'	Attendance: 13,314; Referee: Lutz Fröhlich; Assistant referees: Yū Nakamura, Toshimitsu Yoshida; Fourth official: Fujirō Masukura

21 June 1995 1st-18	Kashiwa Reysol	0–1	Nagoya Grampus Eight	Kashiwa Hitachi Stadium
19:00 JST (UTC+09)		J. League	Okayama 50'	Attendance: 11,388; Referee: Hideo Kikuchi; Assistant referees: Toshiyuki Mayuzumi, Kōji Minami; Fourth official: Terunobu Kakinuma

24 June 1995 1st-19	Gamba Osaka	1–3	Kashiwa Reysol	Kobe Universiade Memorial Stadium
16:00 JST (UTC+09)	Hiraoka 60'	J. League	Careca 58'; Nelsinho 75'; Tanada 84'	Attendance: 14,811; Referee: Yoshimi Ogawa; Assistant referees: Yoshikazu Hiroshima, Hiroyuki Izumi; Fourth official: Keiji Hayashi; Man of the Match: Careca

28 June 1995 1st-20	Júbilo Iwata	3–2	Kashiwa Reysol	Júbilo Iwata Stadium
19:01 JST (UTC+09)	Schillaci 10' (pen.), 62', 73'	J. League	Tanada 80'; Valdir 83'	Attendance: 17,218; Referee: Fumikazu Shioyazono; Assistant referees: Yasushi Tsuchimoto, Tōru Kamikawa; Fourth official: Takuya Okada

1 July 1995 1st-21	Kashiwa Reysol	1–2	Urawa Red Diamonds	Kashiwa Hitachi Stadium
19:00 JST (UTC+09)	N. Katō 85' (pen.)	J. League	Fukuda 49' (pen.), 89' (pen.)	Attendance: 12,329; Referee: Armando Perez; Assistant referees: Yū Nakamura, Ichirō Inukai; Fourth official: Shigeaki Yoshiya

8 July 1995 1st-22	Bellmare Hiratsuka	3–2	Kashiwa Reysol	Ehime Matsuyama Athletic Stadium
18:31 JST (UTC+09)	Nakata 7'; Betinho 34' (pen.); Noguchi 75'	J. League	Valdir 27', 77'	Attendance: 11,560; Referee: Hiroyuki Umemoto; Assistant referees: Yasuhiro Hemmi, Satoru Kawano; Fourth official: Tatsuya Hyōdō

12 July 1995 1st-23	Kashiwa Reysol	2–2 (V-goal) (a.e.t.) (5–6 p)	Yokohama Marinos	Kashiwa Hitachi Stadium
19:03 JST (UTC+09)	Tanada 0'; N. Katō 89' (pen.)	J. League	Medina Bello 21'; Noda 80'	Attendance: 11,597; Referee: Tetsuya Hamana; Assistant referees: Hiroshi Fukuda, Toshimitsu Yoshida; Fourth official: Kaoru Nagase
	Penalties
	(penalty scored) Careca; (penalty scored) Nelsinho; (penalty scored) Sawada; (penalty scored) Ōkuma; (penalty scored) N. Katō; (penalty missed) Sugano		(penalty scored) Bisconti; (penalty scored) T. Suzuki; (penalty scored) Omura; (penalty scored) Ihara; (penalty scored) Noda; (penalty scored) Medina Bello

15 July 1995 1st-24	Kashiwa Reysol	1–2 (V-goal) (a.e.t.)	Cerezo Osaka	Kashiwa Hitachi Stadium
19:02 JST (UTC+09)	Tanada 44'	J. League	Kajino 48'; Marquinhos 96' (pen.)	Attendance: 12,708; Referee: Armando Perez; Assistant referees: Toshiyuki Mayuzumi, Takeshi Ōkura; Fourth official: Morio Okamoto

19 July 1995 1st-25	Sanfrecce Hiroshima	1–0 (V-goal) (a.e.t.)	Kashiwa Reysol	Hiroshima Stadium
19:00 JST (UTC+09)	Noh 101'	J. League		Attendance: 8,308; Referee: Hiroyuki Umemoto; Assistant referees: Hiroshi Tanabe, Sōichirō Kaneko; Fourth official: Norio Kuriyama

22 July 1995 1st-26	Kashiwa Reysol	3–1	Shimizu S-Pulse	Kashiwa Hitachi Stadium
19:00 JST (UTC+09)	Nelsinho 29'; Careca 46'; 79' (o.g.)	J. League	Ōenoki 65'	Attendance: 13,416; Referee: Shinichirō Obata; Assistant referees: Kimio Izaki, Masato Nogami; Fourth official: Kazuya Isokawa; Man of the Match: Nelsinho

12 August 1995 2nd-1	Cerezo Osaka	2–1	Kashiwa Reysol	Osaka Nagai No.2 Stadium
19:03 JST (UTC+09)	Kanda 25'; Valdés 63'	J. League	Sugano 56'	Attendance: 9,297; Referee: Yōtarō Moritsu; Assistant referees: Yoshikazu Hiroshima, Kōji Taniuchi; Fourth official: Tsuyoshi Miyake

16 August 1995 2nd-2	Gamba Osaka	3–4 (V-goal) (a.e.t.)	Kashiwa Reysol	Expo '70 Commemorative Stadium
19:00 JST (UTC+09)	Aleinikov 23'; Gillhaus 70'; Yamaguchi 88'	J. League	Tanada 20' 93'; Sugano 44'; Hashiratani 67'	Attendance: 10,078; Referee: Zoran Petrović; Assistant referees: Kazuya Yanagisawa, Hideaki Harada; Fourth official: Kazuo Kakihana; Man of the Match: Kenichi Sugano

19 August 1995 2nd-3	Kashiwa Reysol	1–0 (V-goal) (a.e.t.)	Sanfrecce Hiroshima	Kashiwa Hitachi Stadium
18:59 JST (UTC+09)	Valdir 97'	J. League		Attendance: 12,429; Referee: Tetsuya Hamana; Assistant referees: Toshiyuki Mayuzumi, Kazuhisa Osada; Fourth official: Eita Horikawa; Man of the Match: Valdir

23 August 1995 2nd-4	Urawa Red Diamonds	0–2	Kashiwa Reysol	Tokyo National Stadium
19:03 JST (UTC+09)		J. League	Hashiratani 32', 42'	Attendance: 51,580; Referee: Yoshitsugu Katayama; Assistant referees: Hitoshi Yamada, Kō Ōishi; Fourth official: Hide Lii; Man of the Match: Kōichi Hashiratani

26 August 1995 2nd-5	Kashiwa Reysol	3–0	Bellmare Hiratsuka	Kashiwa Hitachi Stadium
19:03 JST (UTC+09)	16' (o.g.); Sugano 33'; Careca 89'	J. League		Attendance: 15,865; Referee: Hideo Kikuchi; Assistant referees: Yū Nakamura, Akihisa Makino; Fourth official: Atsushi Nakamura; Man of the Match: Takahiro Shimotaira

2 September 1995 2nd-6	Yokohama Marinos	2–3	Kashiwa Reysol	Yokohama Mitsuzawa Football Stadium
19:00 JST (UTC+09)	Bisconti 5', 73'	J. League	Hashiratani 28'; Careca 57'; Tanada 82'	Attendance: 12,123; Referee: Naotsugu Fuse; Assistant referees: Masahiro Katagiri, Kimio Izaki; Fourth official: Haruo Imai; Man of the Match: Nelsinho

6 September 1995 2nd-7	Kashiwa Reysol	2–4	Júbilo Iwata	Kashiwa Hitachi Stadium
19:00 JST (UTC+09)	Watanabe 75'; Nelsinho 89'	J. League	Fujita 34'; Nakayama 54'; Kudō 71'; Fukunishi 83'	Attendance: 11,846; Referee: Zoran Petrović; Assistant referees: Takashi Kunori, Takayoshi Kashino; Fourth official: Kōji Sugikawa

9 September 1995 2nd-8	Kashiwa Reysol	1–2	Nagoya Grampus Eight	Kashiwa Hitachi Stadium
19:03 JST (UTC+09)	Sugano 89'	J. League	31' (o.g.); Torres 70'	Attendance: 14,152; Referee: Armando Perez; Assistant referees: Satoru Ishizawa, Masato Nogami; Fourth official: Katsuhiko Takayama

13 September 1995 2nd-9	JEF United Ichihara	1–3	Kashiwa Reysol	Ichihara Stadium
19:02 JST (UTC+09)	T. Gotō 80'	J. League	Tanada 8', 53'; Careca 67'	Attendance: 10,439; Referee: Tatsumi Ōno; Assistant referees: Kimio Izaki, Ichirō Inukai; Fourth official: Eiji Kawai; Man of the Match: Shin Tanada

16 September 1995 2nd-10	Kashima Antlers	4–3	Kashiwa Reysol	Tokyo National Stadium
19:05 JST (UTC+09)	Kurosaki 34'; Leonardo 36', 43' (pen.); Mazinho 79'	J. League	Tanada 11'; N. Katō 70' (pen.); Yokoyama 81'	Attendance: 35,822; Referee: Alfredo Trentalange; Assistant referees: Yū Nakamura, Mitsuru Satō; Fourth official: Hide Lii

23 September 1995 2nd-11	Kashiwa Reysol	1–7	Verdy Kawasaki	Kashiwa Hitachi Stadium
15:03 JST (UTC+09)	Caio 67'	J. League	Alcindo 37', 51'; Kitazawa 43'; Bismarck 66', 82'; Miura 74', 77'	Attendance: 14,032; Referee: Yasuhiro Matsuzaki; Assistant referees: Tatsumi Ōno, Kō Ōishi; Fourth official: Kazuya Isokawa

27 September 1995 2nd-12	Yokohama Flügels	2–1	Kashiwa Reysol	Yokohama Mitsuzawa Football Stadium
19:03 JST (UTC+09)	Evair 68', 71'	J. League	Bentinho 82'	Attendance: 9,617; Referee: Yoshitsugu Katayama; Assistant referees: Noboru Ishiyama, Takuji Fukazawa; Fourth official: Hiroshi Yamaguchi

30 September 1995 2nd-13	Kashiwa Reysol	2–3	Shimizu S-Pulse	Kashiwa Hitachi Stadium
15:04 JST (UTC+09)	Bentinho 20', 44'	J. League	Shirai 6'; Nagahashi 61'; Marco 85'	Attendance: 12,332; Referee: Zoran Petrović; Assistant referees: Kenichi Koshiyama, Akihisa Makino; Fourth official: Masahiko Tsuma

4 October 1995 2nd-14	Kashiwa Reysol	3–0	Gamba Osaka	Kashiwa Hitachi Stadium
19:00 JST (UTC+09)	Bentinho 42'; Valdir 60'; Yokoyama 75'	J. League		Attendance: 10,038; Referee: Fumikazu Shioyazono; Assistant referees: Mitsuru Satō, Toshiyuki Mayuzumi; Fourth official: Terunobu Kakinuma; Man of the Match: Bentinho

7 October 1995 2nd-15	Sanfrecce Hiroshima	2–1	Kashiwa Reysol	Hiroshima Stadium
16:05 JST (UTC+09)	Noh 1'; Michiki 11'	J. League	Bentinho 19'	Attendance: 7,215; Referee: Keiichi Sunakawa; Assistant referees: Naoki Esumi, Kōji Minami; Fourth official: Yutaka Miyake

14 October 1995 2nd-16	Kashiwa Reysol	2–5	Urawa Red Diamonds	Kashiwa Hitachi Stadium
15:03 JST (UTC+09)	Tanada 64'; Bentinho 89'	J. League	Okano 10', 34'; Bein 29'; Fukunaga 59'; Toninho 68'	Attendance: 13,061; Referee: Hiroyuki Umemoto; Assistant referees: Hideaki Harada, Satoru Kawano; Fourth official: Eita Horikawa

18 October 1995 2nd-17	Bellmare Hiratsuka	0–1	Kashiwa Reysol	Hiratsuka Stadium
19:04 JST (UTC+09)		J. League	Tanada 5'	Attendance: 9,472; Referee: Yoshimi Ogawa; Assistant referees: Takashi Kunori, Kenichi Koshiyama; Fourth official: Yoshiharu Nakamura; Man of the Match: Shin Tanada

21 October 1995 2nd-18	Kashiwa Reysol	4–2	Yokohama Marinos	Tokyo National Stadium
15:04 JST (UTC+09)	Valdir 3'; Careca 18', 61'; Nelsinho 52'	J. League	Bisconti 22'; Yasunaga 58'	Attendance: 29,523; Referee: Hideo Kikuchi; Assistant referees: Takeshi Ōkura, Tetsu Karakida; Fourth official: Noritake Sakurada; Man of the Match: Careca

1 November 1995 2nd-19	Júbilo Iwata	1–1 (V-goal) (a.e.t.) (5–6 p)	Kashiwa Reysol	Júbilo Iwata Stadium
19:01 JST (UTC+09)	Schillaci 2'	J. League	Bentinho 89'	Attendance: 14,664; Referee: Armando Perez; Assistant referees: Kazuaki Hamaguchi, Naoyuki Mori; Fourth official: Takuya Okada; Man of the Match: Yōichi Doi
	Penalties
	(penalty missed) Kudō; (penalty scored) Dunga; (penalty scored) Fujita; (penalty missed) Nakayama; (penalty scored) Dido; (penalty scored) Katsuya; (penalty missed) Tanaka; (penalty scored) Koga; (penalty missed) H. Suzuki		(penalty scored) Bentinho; (penalty scored) Date; (penalty missed) Watanabe; (penalty scored) Shimotaira; (penalty missed) Sawada; (penalty scored) Ōkuma; (penalty missed) Arima; (penalty scored) Katanosaka; (penalty scored) Caio

4 November 1995 2nd-20	Nagoya Grampus Eight	3–1	Kashiwa Reysol	Nagoya Mizuho Athletics Stadium
15:33 JST (UTC+09)	Moriyama 64', 69'; Stojković 82' (pen.)	J. League	Careca 44'	Attendance: 19,484; Referee: Yōtarō Moritsu; Assistant referees: Yasuhiro Hemmi, Naoki Esumi; Fourth official: Takahiro Murakami

8 November 1995 2nd-21	Kashiwa Reysol	4–3 (V-goal) (a.e.t.)	JEF United Ichihara	Kashiwa Hitachi Stadium
19:04 JST (UTC+09)	Nelsinho 21', 44'; Valdir 61'; Caio 98'	J. League	Y. Gotō 17'; Maslovar 27'; Jō 89'	Attendance: 11,044; Referee: Zoran Petrović; Assistant referees: Hitoshi Yamada, Satoru Ishizawa; Fourth official: Eiji Kawai; Man of the Match: Nelsinho

11 November 1995 2nd-22	Kashiwa Reysol	3–3 (V-goal) (a.e.t.) (2–4 p)	Kashima Antlers	Kashiwa Hitachi Stadium
14:01 JST (UTC+09)	Careca 7' (pen.); Tanada 51'; Date 58'	J. League	Masuda 1', 48'; Hasegawa 18'	Attendance: 14,273; Referee: Yoshimi Ogawa; Assistant referees: Kimio Izaki, Kō Ōishi; Fourth official: Terunobu Kakinuma
	Penalties
	(penalty scored) Careca; (penalty missed) Date; (penalty scored) Nelsinho; (penalty missed) Valdir		(penalty scored) Jorginho; (penalty scored) Hasegawa; (penalty scored) Manaka; (penalty scored) Honda

15 November 1995 2nd-23	Verdy Kawasaki	2–0	Kashiwa Reysol	Kawasaki Todoroki Stadium
19:04 JST (UTC+09)	Takeda 18'; Miura 80'	J. League		Attendance: 15,556; Referee: Keiichi Sunakawa; Assistant referees: Noboru Ishiyama, Akihisa Makino; Fourth official: Tasuku Onodera

18 November 1995 2nd-24	Kashiwa Reysol	3–2	Yokohama Flügels	Kashiwa Hitachi Stadium
15:00 JST (UTC+09)	Bentinho 2', 85'; Caio 35'	J. League	Rodrigo 19' (pen.); Zinho 70'	Attendance: 12,478; Referee: Fumikazu Shioyazono; Assistant referees: Mitsuru Satō, Toshimitsu Yoshida; Fourth official: Atsushi Nakamura; Man of the Match: Bentinho

22 November 1995 2nd-25	Shimizu S-Pulse	1–3	Kashiwa Reysol	Nihondaira Sports Stadium
19:05 JST (UTC+09)	Marco 45'	J. League	Bentinho 10', 25'; Caio 41'	Attendance: 17,358; Referee: Yoshimi Ogawa; Assistant referees: Masahiro Katagiri, Ichirō Inukai; Fourth official: Toshiyuki Asanuma; Man of the Match: Bentinho

25 November 1995 2nd-26	Kashiwa Reysol	4–0	Cerezo Osaka	Kashiwa Hitachi Stadium
15:04 JST (UTC+09)	Bentinho 26'; Tanada 51', 89'; N. Katō 68'	J. League		Attendance: 12,041; Referee: Naotsugu Fuse; Assistant referees: Hiroshi Fukuda, Takuji Fukazawa; Fourth official: Kaoru Nagase; Man of the Match: Shin Tanada

=== Emperor's Cup ===
3 December 1995 1st Round	Toshiba	1–2	Kashiwa Reysol	Kashiwa Hitachi Stadium
: JST (UTC+09)	Katō ?'		Caio ?'; Hashiratani ?'

10 December 1995 2nd Round	Urawa Red Diamonds	1–0	Kashiwa Reysol	Tochigi Utsunomiya Green Stadium
12:59 JST (UTC+09)	Bein 31'			Attendance: 14,342; Referee: Yōtarō Moritsu

== Player statistics ==
Pos.	Nat.	Player	D.o.B. (Age)	Height / Weight	J.League		Emperor's Cup		Total	
Pos.	Nat.	Player	D.o.B. (Age)	Height / Weight	Apps	Goals	Apps	Goals	Apps	Goals
DF	(Japan)	Tomoyuki Kajino	July 11, 1960 (aged 34)	182 cm / 76 kg	5	0	0	0	5	0
FW	(Brazil)	Careca	October 5, 1960 (aged 34)	179 cm / 75 kg	30	10	0	0	30	10
MF	(Japan)	Kōichi Hashiratani	March 1, 1961 (aged 34)	178 cm / 75 kg	31	4	2	1	33	5
DF	(Brazil)	Nelsinho	December 31, 1962 (aged 32)	179 cm / 77 kg	41	6	1	0	42	6
MF	(Brazil)	Valdir	October 25, 1965 (aged 29)	172 cm / 66 kg	27	7	1	0	28	7
FW	(Brazil)	Müller	January 31, 1966 (aged 29)	178 cm / 72 kg	11	5	0	0	11	5
DF	(Japan)	Michihisa Date	August 22, 1966 (aged 28)	180 cm / 74 kg	28	1	1	0	29	1
GK	(Japan)	Hirokazu Gōshi	December 29, 1966 (aged 28)	175 cm / 75 kg	4	0	0	0	4	0
DF	(Japan)	Kenji Ōba	August 14, 1967 (aged 27)	174 cm / 66 kg	24	1	0	0	24	1
MF	(Japan)	Takeshi Hoshi	November 23, 1967 (aged 27)	178 cm / 68 kg	0	0				
GK	(Japan)	Osamu Chiba	May 22, 1968 (aged 26)	184 cm / 77 kg	3	0	0	0	3	0
FW	(Japan)	Shinichirō Tani	November 13, 1968 (aged 26)	170 cm / 72 kg	2	0	0	0	2	0
MF	(Japan)	Yūji Ōkuma	January 19, 1969 (aged 26)	174 cm / 70 kg	24	0	0	0	24	0
DF	(Japan)	Satoshi Kumanomidō	April 5, 1969 (aged 25)	179 cm / 74 kg	0	0				
FW	(Japan)	Satoshi Ōkura	May 22, 1969 (aged 25)	180 cm / 73 kg	17	1	2	0	19	1
MF	(Japan)	Yūji Yokoyama	July 6, 1969 (aged 25)	177 cm / 70 kg	22	2	1	0	23	2
MF	(Japan)	Shin Tanada	July 25, 1969 (aged 25)	165 cm / 58 kg	44	16	1	0	45	16
MF	(Japan)	Nozomu Katō	October 7, 1969 (aged 25)	170 cm / 62 kg	46	8	2	0	48	8
GK	(Japan)	Ryūji Katō	December 24, 1969 (aged 25)	184 cm / 78 kg	29	0	0	0	29	0
DF	(Japan)	Kentarō Ishikawa	February 12, 1970 (aged 25)	181 cm / 72 kg	17	1	0	0	17	1
FW	(Japan)	Shūji Kusano	April 2, 1970 (aged 24)	179 cm / 73 kg	10	0	0	0	10	0
DF	(Japan)	Kentarō Sawada	May 15, 1970 (aged 24)	170 cm / 62 kg	43	0	2	0	45	0
DF	(Japan)	Kazuhisa Irii	October 18, 1970 (aged 24)	169 cm / 63 kg	2	0	0	0	2	0
DF/MF	(Japan)	Nobutaka Tanaka	June 10, 1971 (aged 23)	182 cm / 75 kg	28	0	0	0	28	0
FW	(Japan)	Kenichi Sugano	August 8, 1971 (aged 23)	170 cm / 65 kg	26	4	0	0	26	4
GK	(Japan)	Dai Satō	August 16, 1971 (aged 23)	190 cm / 85 kg	0	0				
MF	(Japan)	Takahiro Shimotaira	December 18, 1971 (aged 23)	174 cm / 67 kg	35	1	2	0	37	1
MF	(Japan)	Satoshi Ōishi	June 26, 1972 (aged 22)	170 cm / 70 kg	3	0	0	0	3	0
DF	(Japan)	Takeshi Watanabe	September 10, 1972 (aged 22)	181 cm / 76 kg	45	1	2	0	47	1
FW	(Japan)	Kenji Arima	November 26, 1972 (aged 22)	180 cm / 70 kg	7	0	0	0	7	0
GK	(Japan)	Yōichi Doi	July 25, 1973 (aged 21)	183 cm / 75 kg	17	0	2	0	19	0
MF	(Japan)	Tatsuma Yoshida	June 9, 1974 (aged 20)	174 cm / 64 kg	0	0				
DF	(Japan)	Dai Kanō	August 28, 1974 (aged 20)	171 cm / 64 kg	0	0				
FW	(Japan)	Naoki Sakai	August 2, 1975 (aged 19)	175 cm / 60 kg	19	0	0	0	19	0
MF	(Japan)	Yoshikazu Kawashima	August 8, 1975 (aged 19)	169 cm / 64 kg	0	0				
DF	(Japan)	Kazumasa Nabeta	August 22, 1975 (aged 19)	166 cm / 61 kg	0	0				
FW	(Japan)	Toshiyuki Nakagawa	April 6, 1976 (aged 18)	175 cm / 66 kg	0	0				
MF	(Japan)	Takashi Kojima †	August 4, 1973 (aged 21)	177 cm / 67 kg	0	0				
FW	(Japan)	Kōichi Hashimoto †	January 13, 1969 (aged 26)	170 cm / 68 kg	0	0				
DF	(Japan)	Tomohiro Katanosaka †	April 18, 1971 (aged 23)	172 cm / 71 kg	11	0	2	0	13	0
FW	(Brazil)	Bentinho †	December 18, 1971 (aged 23)	cm / – kg	14	12	2	0	16	12
MF	(Brazil)	Caio †	August 10, 1968 (aged 26)	174 cm / 70 kg	9	4	2	1	11	5

- † player(s) joined the team after the opening of this season.

== Transfers ==
In:

No.	Pos.	Nation	Player
—	GK	JPN	Osamu Chiba (from Kashima Antlers)
—	GK	JPN	Ryūji Katō (from PJM Futures)
—	DF	JPN	Michihisa Date (from Júbilo Iwata)
—	DF	JPN	Kenji Ōba (from Kashima Antlers)
—	DF	JPN	Satoshi Kumanomidō (from NTT Kanto)
—	DF	JPN	Kazuhisa Irii (from Kashima Antlers)
—	MF	BRA	Valdir Benedito (from Atlético Mineiro)
—	FW	JPN	Kenji Arima (from Nihon University)

Out: no data

== Transfers during the season ==
=== In ===
- (Japan) Takashi Kojima (from Hyōgo FC)
- (Japan) Kōichi Hashimoto (from Corinthians)
- (Japan) Tomohiro Katanosaka (from Sanfrecce Hiroshima)
- (Brazil) Bentinho (on August)
- (Brazil) Wolnei Caio (on August)

=== Out ===
- (Brazil) Müller (on June)

== Awards ==
none

== Other pages ==
- (in Japanese) J. League official site
- (in Japanese) Kashiwa Reysol official site
