= 2021 J1 League =

29th season of J1 League

J1 League
- Season: 2021
- Dates: 26 February – 4 December
- Champions: Kawasaki Frontale; 4th J1 title 4th Japanese title
- Relegated: Tokushima Vortis; Oita Trinita; Vegalta Sendai; Yokohama FC
- Champions League: Kawasaki Frontale; Yokohama F. Marinos; Vissel Kobe; Urawa Red Diamonds
- Matches: 380
- Goals: 920 (2.42 per match)
- Top goalscorer: Leandro Damião; Daizen Maeda (23 goals each)
- Biggest home win: Yokohama F. Marinos 8–0 FC Tokyo (6 November 2021)
- Biggest away win: Urawa Red Diamonds 0–5 Kawasaki Frontale (21 March 2021)
- Highest scoring: Kashima Antlers 5–3 Yokohama F. Marinos (15 May 2021); Yokohama FC 5–3 Tokushima Vortis (16 October 2021); Yokohama F. Marinos 8–0 FC Tokyo (6 November 2021)
- Longest winning run: 7 matches Kawasaki Frontale; Yokohama F. Marinos
- Longest unbeaten run: 25 matches Kawasaki Frontale
- Longest winless run: 13 matches Yokohama FC
- Longest losing run: 7 matches Avispa Fukuoka; Oita Trinita
- Highest attendance: 30,657; Yokohama F. Marinos 1–1 Kawasaki Frontale (4 December 2021)
- Lowest attendance: 1,899; Yokohama FC 0–3 Sanfrecce Hiroshima (7 April 2021) (excluding matches played behind closed doors)
- Total attendance: 2,531,007
- Average attendance: 6,661 (excluding matches played behind closed doors)

The 2021 J1 League, also known as the 2021 Meiji Yasuda J1 League (Japanese: 2021 明治安田生命J1リーグ, Hepburn: 2021 Meiji Yasuda Seimei J1 Rīgu) for sponsorship reasons, was the 29th season of the J1 League, the top Japanese professional league for association football clubs, since its establishment in 1992. This was seventh season of J1 League as renamed from J. League Division 1. The league began on 26 February and ended on 4 December 2021.

Kawasaki Frontale were the reigning champions, having won their third title in 2020 with four rounds to play. They successfully retained the title, again with four rounds to play.

On 20 November 2021, Oita Trinita, Vegalta Sendai, and Yokohama FC were relegated to J2 League with two games to play. On the final matchday, Tokushima Vortis was relegated back to J2 League after just one season.

== Changes from the previous season ==
There were no teams relegated the previous season due to impacts related to the COVID-19 pandemic. Instead, four relegation places were applied for the current season to reduce the total number of teams from 20 back to 18.

Two teams were promoted from the 2020 J2 League: Tokushima Vortis won the title and clinched a second promotion to J1 (the first came in 2013), while Avispa Fukuoka came second, returning to J1 after five seasons.

== Clubs ==
Locations of the 2021 J1 League teams
2021 J1 League teams in Greater Tokyo Area
2021 J1 League teams in Keihanshin

Club	Location	Stadium	Capacity	Previous season rank
Hokkaido Consadole Sapporo	Hokkaido	Sapporo Dome; Sapporo Atsubetsu Stadium	41,484; 20,861	J1 (12th)
Vegalta Sendai	Miyagi Prefecture	Yurtec Stadium Sendai	19,694	J1 (17th)
Kashima Antlers	Ibaraki Prefecture	Kashima Soccer Stadium	40,728	J1 (5th)
Urawa Red Diamonds	Saitama Prefecture	Saitama Stadium 2002	63,700	J1 (10th)
Kashiwa Reysol	Chiba Prefecture	Hitachi Kashiwa Stadium	15,900	J1 (7th)
FC Tokyo	Tokyo	Ajinomoto Stadium	49,970	J1 (6th)
Yokohama FC	Kanagawa Prefecture	Mitsuzawa Stadium	15,046	J1 (15th)
Yokohama F. Marinos	Kanagawa Prefecture	Nissan Stadium	72,327	J1 (9th)
Kawasaki Frontale	Kanagawa Prefecture	Todoroki Stadium	26,232	**J1 (1st)**
Shonan Bellmare	Kanagawa Prefecture	Lemon Gas Stadium Hiratsuka	18,500	J1 (18th)
Shimizu S-Pulse	Shizuoka Prefecture	IAI Stadium Nihondaira	20,339	J1 (16th)
Nagoya Grampus	Aichi Prefecture	Toyota Stadium	45,000	J1 (3rd)
Gamba Osaka	Osaka Prefecture	Panasonic Stadium Suita	39,694	J1 (2nd)
Cerezo Osaka	Osaka Prefecture	Yanmar Stadium	47,853	J1 (4th)
Vissel Kobe	Hyōgo Prefecture	Noevir Stadium Kobe	30,132	J1 (14th)
Sanfrecce Hiroshima	Hiroshima Prefecture	Edion Stadium	36,894	J1 (8th)
Tokushima Vortis	Tokushima Prefecture	Pocarisweat Stadium	20,441	J2 (1st)
Avispa Fukuoka	Fukuoka Prefecture	Best Denki Stadium	21,562	J2 (2nd)
Sagan Tosu	Saga Prefecture	Ekimae Real Estate Stadium	24,130	J1 (13th)
Oita Trinita	Ōita Prefecture	Showa Denko Dome Oita	40,000	J1 (11th)

=== Personnel and kits ===
Club	Manager	Captain	Kit manufacturer	Front shirt sponsor
Avispa Fukuoka	(Japan) Shigetoshi Hasebe	(Japan) Hiroyuki Mae	Yonex	Shin Nihon Seiyaku
Cerezo Osaka	(Japan) Akio Kogiku	(Japan) Hiroshi Kiyotake	Puma	Yanmar
FC Tokyo	(Japan) Shinichi Morishita (interim)	(Japan) Keigo Higashi	New Balance	XFLAG
Gamba Osaka	(Japan) Masanobu Matsunami (interim)	(Japan) Genta Miura	Umbro	Panasonic
Hokkaido Consadole Sapporo	(Serbia) Mihailo Petrović	(Japan) Hiroki Miyazawa	Mizuno	Ishiya
Kashima Antlers	(Japan) Naoki Soma	(Japan) Kento Misao	Nike	Lixil
Kashiwa Reysol	(Brazil) Nelsinho Baptista	(Japan) Hidekazu Otani	Yonex	Hitachi
Kawasaki Frontale	(Japan) Toru Oniki	(Japan) Shogo Taniguchi	Puma	Fujitsu
Nagoya Grampus	(Italy) Massimo Ficcadenti	(Japan) Yuichi Maruyama	Mizuno	Toyota
Oita Trinita	(Japan) Tomohiro Katanosaka	(Japan) Shun Takagi	Puma	Daihatsu Kyushu
Sagan Tosu	(South Korea) Kim Myung-hwi	(Brazil) Eduardo	New Balance	Kimura Information Technology
Sanfrecce Hiroshima	(Japan) Kentaro Sawada (interim)	(Japan) Sho Sasaki	Nike	EDION
Shimizu S-Pulse	(Japan) Hiroaki Hiraoka	(Japan) Ryo Takeuchi	Puma	Suzuyo
Shonan Bellmare	(Japan) Satoshi Yamaguchi	(Japan) Takuya Okamoto	Penalty	Meldia
Tokushima Vortis	(Spain) Dani Poyatos	(Japan) Ken Iwao	Mizuno	Pocari Sweat
Urawa Red Diamonds	(Spain) Ricardo Rodriguez	(Japan) Shusaku Nishikawa	Nike	Polus
Vegalta Sendai	(Japan) Makoto Teguramori	(Mozambique) Simão Mate Junior	Adidas	Iris Ohyama
Vissel Kobe	(Japan) Atsuhiro Miura	(Spain) Andrés Iniesta	Asics	Rakuten
Yokohama FC	(Japan) Tomonobu Hayakawa	(Japan) Yuta Minami	Soccer Junky	Onodera Group
Yokohama F. Marinos	(Australia) Kevin Muscat	(Japan) Takuya Kida	Adidas	Nissan

=== Managerial changes ===
Team	Outgoing manager	Manner of departure	Date of vacancy	Incoming manager	Date of appointment
Yokohama FC	(Japan) Takahiro Shimotaira	Sacked	7 April 2021	(Japan) Tomonobu Hayakawa	8 April 2021
Kashima Antlers	(Brazil) Antônio Carlos Zago	Sacked	14 April 2021	(Japan) Naoki Soma	14 April 2021
Gamba Osaka	(Japan) Tsuneyasu Miyamoto	Sacked	13 May 2021	(Japan) Masanobu Matsunami (interim) (Note: Matsunami was initially appointed as caretaker manager, but he was made interim manager on 1 June 2021.)	14 May 2021
Yokohama F. Marinos	(Australia) Ange Postecoglou	Signed by Celtic	10 June 2021	(Japan) Hideki Matsunaga (caretaker)	10 June 2021
Yokohama F. Marinos	(Japan) Hideki Matsunaga	End of caretaker spell	18 July 2021	(Australia) Kevin Muscat	18 July 2021
Cerezo Osaka	(Brazil) Levir Culpi	Sacked	26 August 2021	(Japan) Akio Kogiku	26 August 2021
Shonan Bellmare	(Japan) Bin Ukishima	Resigned	31 August 2021	(Japan) Satoshi Yamaguchi	1 September 2021
Sanfrecce Hiroshima	(Japan) Hiroshi Jofuku	Resigned	26 October 2021	(Japan) Kentaro Sawada (interim)	26 October 2021
Shimizu S-Pulse	(Spain) Miguel Ángel Lotina	Sacked	4 November 2021	(Japan) Hiroaki Hiraoka	4 November 2021
FC Tokyo	(Japan) Kenta Hasegawa	Resigned	7 November 2021	(Japan) Shinichi Morishita (interim)	10 November 2021

=== Foreign players ===
As of 2019 season, there are no more restrictions on a number of signed foreign players, but clubs could only register up to five foreign players for a single match-day squad. Players from J.League partner nations (Thailand, Vietnam, Myanmar, Malaysia, Cambodia, Singapore, Indonesia and Qatar) were exempted from these restrictions.

- Players name in **bold** indicates the player is registered during the mid-season transfer window.
- Player's name in italics indicates the player has Japanese nationality in addition to their FIFA nationality, or is exempt from being treated as a foreign player due to having been born in Japan and being enrolled in, or having graduated from an approved type of school in the country.

Club	Player 1	Player 2	Player 3	Player 4	Player 5	Player 6	Player 7	Player 8	Former players
Avispa Fukuoka	(Belgium) Jordy Croux	(Brazil) Bruno Mendes	(Brazil) Cauê	(Brazil) Douglas Grolli	(Cameroon) John Mary	(Spain) Carlos Gutiérrez	(Spain) Juanma	(Sweden) Emil Salomonsson	
Cerezo Osaka	(Australia) Adam Taggart	(Brazil) Tiago Pagnussat	(South Korea) Kim Jin-hyeon	(Vietnam) Đặng Văn Lâm					(Brazil) Dankler
FC Tokyo	(Brazil) Adaílton	(Brazil) Bruno Uvini	(Brazil) Diego Oliveira	(Brazil) Leandro	(Lebanon) Joan Oumari				
Gamba Osaka	(Brazil) Leandro Pereira	(Brazil) Patric	(Brazil) Tiago Alves	(Brazil) Wellington Silva	(South Korea) Ju Se-jong	(South Korea) Kim Young-gwon	(South Korea) Shin Won-ho		
Hokkaido Consadole Sapporo	(Brazil) Douglas Oliveira	(Brazil) Lucas Fernandes	(England) Jay Bothroyd	(Slovenia) **Milan Tučić**	(Thailand) Chanathip Songkrasin				(Brazil) Anderson Lopes (Nigeria) Gabriel Okechukwu (South Korea) Kim Min-tae
Kashima Antlers	(Brazil) Arthur Caíke	(Brazil) **Bueno**	(Brazil) Diego Pituca	(Brazil) Everaldo	(Brazil) Juan Alano	(Brazil) Léo Silva	(South Korea) Kwoun Sun-tae		
Kashiwa Reysol	(Brazil) Cristiano	(Brazil) Dodi	(Brazil) Emerson Santos	(Brazil) Matheus Sávio	(Brazil) Richardson	(Brazil) Rodrigo Angelotti	(Russia) Ippey Shinozuka	(South Korea) Kim Seung-gyu	(Brazil) Pedro Raúl
Kawasaki Frontale	(Brazil) Jesiel	(Brazil) João Schmidt	(Brazil) Leandro Damião	(Brazil) **Marcinho**	(South Korea) Jung Sung-ryong	(South Korea) Lee Kyung-tae			
Nagoya Grampus	(Australia) Mitchell Langerak	(Brazil) Gabriel Xavier	(Brazil) Mateus	(Poland) **Jakub Świerczok**	(South Korea) **Kim Min-tae**				
Oita Trinita	(Brazil) Henrique Trevisan	(Brazil) Matheus Pereira							
Sagan Tosu	(Brazil) Eduardo	(Kenya) Ismael Dunga	(Nigeria) Chikeluba Ofoedu	(North Korea) Ryang Yong-gi	(South Korea) Hwang Seok-ho	(South Korea) Park Il-gyu	(South Korea) Ueom Ye-hoon		
Sanfrecce Hiroshima	(Brazil) Douglas Vieira	(Brazil) Ezequiel	(Brazil) Júnior Santos	(Brazil) Rhayner					
Shimizu S-Pulse	(Brazil) Carlinhos Júnior	(Brazil) Elsinho	(Brazil) Renato Augusto	(Brazil) **Ronaldo**	(Brazil) Thiago Santana	(Brazil) Valdo	(Kosovo) **Benjamin Kololli**	(Peru) Erick Noriega	(Brazil) William Matheus
Shonan Bellmare	(Brazil) Welinton Júnior	(Brazil) Wellington	(Norway) Tarik Elyounoussi						(Brazil) Riuler
Tokushima Vortis	(Brazil) Cacá	(Brazil) Diego	(Norway) **Mushaga Bakenga**	(Serbia) Dušan Cvetinović					(Italy) Cristian Battocchio
Urawa Red Diamonds	(Australia) Thomas Deng	(Denmark) **Alexander Scholz**	(Denmark) Kasper Junker						
Vegalta Sendai	(Brazil) Felippe Cardoso	(Brazil) Foguinho	(Ghana) Emmanuel Oti	(Poland) Jakub Słowik	(Serbia) Nedeljko Stojišić				(Curaçao) Quenten Martinus (Mozambique) Simão Mate Junior (Spain) Isaac Cuenca
Vissel Kobe	(Belgium) Thomas Vermaelen	(Brazil) Douglas	(Brazil) Lincoln	(Spain) Andrés Iniesta	(Spain) **Bojan Krkić**	(Spain) Sergi Samper			(Kenya) Ayub Masika
Yokohama FC	(Brazil) **Arthur Silva**	(Brazil) **Felipe Vizeu**	(Brazil) **Gabriel**	(Brazil) Kléber	(Brazil) Maguinho	(Brazil) **Saulo Mineiro**	(Germany) **Svend Brodersen**	(South Korea) Han Ho-gang	(Netherlands) Calvin Jong-a-Pin
Yokohama F. Marinos	(Brazil) Élber	(Brazil) Léo Ceará	(Brazil) Marcos Júnior	(Brazil) Thiago Martins	(Thailand) Theerathon Bunmathan				

== League table ==
Pos	Team	Pld	W	D	L	GF	GA	GD	Pts	Qualification or relegation
1	Kawasaki Frontale (C)	38	28	8	2	81	28	+53	92	Qualification for the AFC Champions League group stage
2	Yokohama F. Marinos	38	24	7	7	82	35	+47	79	Qualification for the AFC Champions League group stage
3	Vissel Kobe	38	21	10	7	62	36	+26	73	Qualification for the AFC Champions League play-off round
4	Kashima Antlers	38	21	6	11	62	36	+26	69	
5	Nagoya Grampus	38	19	9	10	44	30	+14	66	
6	Urawa Red Diamonds	38	18	9	11	45	38	+7	63 (Note: The JPFL awarded a 3–0 win to Shonan Bellmare after Urawa Red Diamonds fielded Zion Suzuki who was an ineligible player. The original score was 3–2 for Shonan Bellmare.)	Qualification for the AFC Champions League group stage (Note: Qualified as the 2021 Emperor's Cup winners.)
7	Sagan Tosu	38	16	11	11	43	35	+8	59	
8	Avispa Fukuoka	38	14	12	12	42	37	+5	54	
9	FC Tokyo	38	15	8	15	49	53	−4	53	
10	Hokkaido Consadole Sapporo	38	14	9	15	48	50	−2	51	
11	Sanfrecce Hiroshima	38	12	13	13	44	42	+2	49	
12	Cerezo Osaka	38	13	9	16	47	51	−4	48	
13	Gamba Osaka	38	12	8	18	33	49	−16	44	
14	Shimizu S-Pulse	38	10	12	16	37	54	−17	42	
15	Kashiwa Reysol	38	12	5	21	37	56	−19	41	
16	Shonan Bellmare	38	7	16	15	36	41	−5	37	
17	Tokushima Vortis (R)	38	10	6	22	34	55	−21	36	Relegation to the J2 League
18	Oita Trinita (R)	38	9	8	21	31	55	−24	35	Relegation to the J2 League
19	Vegalta Sendai (R)	38	5	13	20	31	62	−31	28	Relegation to the J2 League
20	Yokohama FC (R)	38	6	9	23	32	77	−45	27	Relegation to the J2 League

Source: J.League Data Site
Rules for classification: 1) Points; 2) Goal difference; 3) Goals scored; 4) Head-to-head points; 5) Head-to-head goal difference; 6) Head-to-head goal scored; 7) Fair-play points.
(C) Champions; (R) Relegation to the J2 League

== Results table ==
Home \ Away	ANT	AVI	BEL	CER	CON	FMA	FRO	GAM	GRA	REY	RED	SAG	SFR	SSP	TOK	TRI	VEG	VIS	VOR	YFC
Kashima Antlers	—	0–3	3–1	1–0	4–0	5–3	1–2	3–1	0–1	2–1	1–0	1–0	1–1	1–3	3–0	0–0	1–1	1–1	3–0	1–2
Avispa Fukuoka	1–0	—	2–1	2–1	1–2	1–3	1–0	0–1	1–2	1–0	2–0	3–0	1–1	1–2	1–0	1–0	2–2	1–2	3–0	1–1
Shonan Bellmare	1–2	1–1	—	0–0	0–0	0–1	1–1	0–0	0–0	2–4	0–0	0–1	0–0	1–1	0–1	2–0	3–1	0–0	0–1	2–1
Cerezo Osaka	1–2	2–2	1–5	—	0–2	2–1	1–4	1–1	2–1	2–0	1–0	1–0	1–2	2–1	3–3	1–0	0–0	1–1	1–2	2–1
Hokkaido Consadole Sapporo	2–2	0–0	1–1	0–3	—	1–3	0–2	0–2	0–2	3–1	2–1	0–0	0–2	2–0	3–2	2–0	2–1	3–4	1–0	5–1
Yokohama F. Marinos	0–2	2–0	1–1	1–0	2–1	—	1–1	0–1	2–0	1–1	3–0	2–0	3–3	2–1	8–0	5–1	5–0	2–0	1–0	5–0
Kawasaki Frontale	2–1	3–1	2–1	3–2	2–0	2–0	—	4–1	3–2	1–0	1–1	1–0	1–1	1–0	1–0	2–0	2–2	3–1	2–0	3–1
Gamba Osaka	0–1	0–0	0–0	0–1	1–5	2–3	0–2	—	1–3	2–1	0–3	1–0	1–2	0–0	0–0	2–1	2–3	1–2	2–1	2–0
Nagoya Grampus	0–2	1–0	1–0	1–0	1–0	2–1	0–4	2–0	—	2–0	0–0	1–2	1–0	1–1	0–0	1–0	0–1	2–2	3–0	3–0
Kashiwa Reysol	2–1	0–0	2–1	1–0	1–2	1–2	0–0	1–0	0–1	—	0–2	1–3	0–3	1–2	0–4	2–3	1–1	1–2	5–1	2–1
Urawa Red Diamonds	2–1	2–0	0–3 (Note: The JPFL awarded 3–0 win to Shonan Bellmare after Urawa Red Diamonds fielded Zion Suzuki which was an ineligible player. The original score was 3–2 for Shonan Bellmare.)	2–0	0–0	2–1	0–5	1–1	0–0	5–1	—	2–1	1–0	0–1	1–1	3–2	2–0	2–0	1–0	2–0
Sagan Tosu	2–1	0–0	1–1	3–3	1–0	0–4	3–1	0–1	3–1	2–0	2–0	—	0–0	2–1	1–0	0–0	5–0	0–2	2–0	3–0
Sanfrecce Hiroshima	1–4	1–2	0–1	0–1	2–1	1–3	1–1	0–0	1–0	1–0	2–2	1–1	—	1–0	1–2	4–1	1–1	1–1	0–1	0–1
Shimizu S-Pulse	0–4	2–2	1–1	2–1	2–2	2–2	0–2	0–1	0–3	0–1	0–2	0–0	1–0	—	3–0	1–0	2–1	0–2	0–3	1–1
FC Tokyo	1–2	0–0	3–2	3–2	2–1	0–3	2–4	1–0	1–1	0–1	1–2	1–2	0–0	4–0	—	3–0	2–1	2–3	0–2	4–0
Oita Trinita	0–0	2–1	2–0	1–0	1–1	0–1	0–2	2–3	0–3	0–1	1–0	1–1	1–3	1–0	1–1	—	2–0	1–3	1–1	2–0
Vegalta Sendai	0–1	0–1	0–2	1–1	1–1	0–0	1–5	0–1	1–1	1–0	0–0	0–1	2–0	2–3	1–2	2–1	—	0–2	0–1	0–0
Vissel Kobe	1–0	1–0	3–1	1–1	1–0	0–2	1–1	1–0	0–1	1–2	5–1	1–1	3–0	1–1	0–1	1–0	4–2	—	1–0	5–0
Tokushima Vortis	0–1	1–2	1–1	0–1	1–2	0–1	1–3	2–1	0–0	0–1	1–2	3–0	2–4	2–2	0–1	1–1	1–0	1–1	—	2–1
Yokohama FC	0–3	1–1	2–0	1–4	0–1	2–2	0–2	3–1	2–0	1–1	0–2	0–0	0–3	1–1	0–1	1–2	2–2	0–2	5–3	—

Source: Meiji Yasuda J1 League
Legend: Blue = home team win; Yellow = draw; Red = away team win.

== Season statistics ==
=== Scoring ===
==== Top scorers ====
Rank	Player	Club	Goals
1	(Brazil) Leandro Damião	Kawasaki Frontale	23
1	(Japan) Daizen Maeda	Yokohama F. Marinos	23
3	(Japan) Kyogo Furuhashi	Vissel Kobe	15
4	(Japan) Ayase Ueda	Kashima Antlers	14
5	(Brazil) Diego Oliveira	FC Tokyo	13
5	(Brazil) Patric	Gamba Osaka	13
5	(Brazil) Thiago Santana	Shimizu S-Pulse	13
8	(Brazil) Anderson Lopes	Hokkaido Consadole Sapporo	12
8	(Japan) Ado Onaiwu	Yokohama F. Marinos	12
10	(Brazil) Léo Ceará	Yokohama F. Marinos	10
10	(Japan) Ryotaro Araki	Kashima Antlers	10
10	(Japan) Yu Kobayashi	Kawasaki Frontale	10

==== Hat-tricks ====
Player	For	Against	Result	Date
(Brazil) Anderson Lopes	Hokkaido Consadole Sapporo	Vissel Kobe	3–4 (H)	20 March 2021
(Japan) Ado Onaiwu	Yokohama F. Marinos	FC Tokyo	3–0 (A)	1 May 2021
(Japan) Shoma Doi	Kashima Antlers	Yokohama F. Marinos	5–3 (H)	15 May 2021
(Japan) Kyogo Furuhashi	Vissel Kobe	Yokohama FC	5–0 (H)	23 June 2021
(Japan) Daizen Maeda	Yokohama F. Marinos	Oita Trinita	5–1 (H)	15 August 2021
(Brazil) Léo Ceará	Yokohama F. Marinos	Vegalta Sendai	5–0 (H)	21 August 2021
(Brazil) Douglas Vieira	Sanfrecce Hiroshima	Kashiwa Reysol	3–0 (A)	18 September 2021
(Japan) Daizen Maeda	Yokohama F. Marinos	FC Tokyo	8–0 (H)	6 November 2021
(Brazil) Patric	Gamba Osaka	Oita Trinita	3–2 (A)	7 November 2021

==== Top assists ====
Rank	Player	Club	Assists
1	(Japan) Miki Yamane	Kawasaki Frontale	12
2	(Japan) Kota Mizunuma	Yokohama F. Marinos	9
3	(Brazil) Leandro Damião	Kawasaki Frontale	8
3	(Japan) Yuki Soma	Nagoya Grampus	8
5	(Japan) Ryotaro Araki	Kashima Antlers	7
5	(Japan) Tatsuki Seko	Yokohama FC	7
5	(Japan) Yoshinori Muto	Vissel Kobe	7
8	(Brazil) Élber	Yokohama F. Marinos	6
8	(Japan) Hokuto Shimoda	Yokohama F. Marinos	6
8	(Japan) Ryo Hatsuse	Vissel Kobe	6
8	(Japan) Teruhito Nakagawa	Yokohama F. Marinos	6
8	(Japan) Yusuke Maruhashi	Cerezo Osaka	6
8	(Japan) Yuta Higuchi	Sagan Tosu	6
8	(Sweden) Emil Salomonsson	Avispa Fukuoka	6
8	(Thailand) Chanathip Songkrasin	Hokkaido Consadole Sapporo	6

=== Discipline ===
==== Player ====
- Most yellow cards: 9
  - (Brazil) Douglas Grolli (Avispa Fukuoka)
- Most red cards: 2
  - (Japan) Takumi Kamijima (Kashiwa Reysol)
  - (South Korea) Kim Min-tae (Nagoya Grampus)
  - (Japan) Takaaki Shichi (Avispa Fukuoka)

==== Club ====
- Most yellow cards: 49
  - Avispa Fukuoka
  - Kashima Antlers
- Most red cards: 3
  - FC Tokyo
  - Kashima Antlers
  - Sagan Tosu
  - Yokohama F. Marinos

== Awards ==
Award	Winner	Club
Manager of the Year	(Spain) Ricardo Rodríguez	Urawa Red Diamonds
Most Valuable Player	(Brazil) Leandro Damião	Kawasaki Frontale
Rookie of the Year	(Japan) Ryotaro Araki	Kashima Antlers
Top Scorer	(Brazil) Leandro Damião (Japan) Daizen Maeda	Kawasaki Frontale; Yokohama F. Marinos

J.League Best XI
Goalkeeper	(Australia) Mitchell Langerak (Nagoya Grampus)			
Defence	(Brazil) Jesiel (Kawasaki Frontale)		(Japan) Shogo Taniguchi (Kawasaki Frontale)	(Japan) Miki Yamane (Kawasaki Frontale)
Midfield	(Japan) Akihiro Ienaga (Kawasaki Frontale)	(Spain) Andrés Iniesta (Vissel Kobe)	(Japan) Sho Inagaki (Nagoya Grampus)	(Japan) Yasuto Wakizaka (Kawasaki Frontale)
Attack	(Brazil) Leandro Damião (Kawasaki Frontale)		(Japan) Daizen Maeda (Yokohama F. Marinos)	(Japan) Reo Hatate (Kawasaki Frontale)

2021 J1 League Best XI

== See also ==
- J.League MVP of the month
