= Shin Won-ho (disambiguation) =

Shin Won-ho may refer to:

- Shin Won-ho (director) (born 1975), South Korean director and television producer
- Shin Won-ho (born 1991), South Korean singer, actor
- Shin Won-ho (footballer) (born 2001), South Korean footballer
