= Goshi =

Goshi may refer to:

== People ==
- Eiko Goshi (born 1954), Japanese swimmer
- Goshi Hosono (born 1971), Japanese politician
- Goshi Okubo (born 1986), Japanese footballer
- Hirokazu Goshi (born 1966), Japanese footballer
- Ryūden Gōshi (born 1990), Japanese sumo wrestler

== Places ==
- Goshi, Kenya, a settlement in Kenya
- Goshi Gewog, a village block of Dagana District, Bhutan
- Goshi River, or Voi River, in Kenya
- Gōshi Station, in Isesaki, Gunma, Japan

== Other uses ==
- 22402 Goshi, a minor planet

== See also ==
- List of judo techniques, including several Judo throws developed by Kano Jigoro with goshi in the name
- 豪志 (disambiguation)
