= Mitsuteru Watanabe =

Japanese footballer

Mitsuteru Watanabe 渡辺 光輝
Personal information
- Full name: Mitsuteru Watanabe
- Date of birth: April 10, 1974 (age 52)
- Place of birth: Shizuoka, Japan
- Height: 1.77 m (5 ft 9 1/2 in)
- Positions: Defender; midfielder

Youth career
- 1990–1992: Hamamatsu Nishi High School

College career
Years	Team	Apps	(Gls)
1993–1996	Waseda University		

Senior career*
Years	Team	Apps	(Gls)
1997–2003	Kashiwa Reysol	136	(17)
2004–2005	Gamba Osaka	41	(2)
2006	Yokohama FC	0	(0)
Total		177	(19)
Medal record
Kashiwa Reysol
Winner	J.League Cup	1999
Gamba Osaka
Winner	J1 League	2005
Runner-up	J.League Cup	2005
- * Club domestic league appearances and goals

Mitsuteru Watanabe (渡辺 光輝, Watanabe Mitsuteru; born April 10, 1974) is a former Japanese football player.

== Playing career ==
Watanabe was born in Shizuoka Prefecture on April 10, 1974. After graduating from Waseda University, he joined J1 League club Kashiwa Reysol in 1997. He played many matches as right side midfielder from 1998 and the club won the champions 1999 J.League Cup. In 2000, he became a regular player as right side midfielder. The club also won the 3rd place in 1999 and 2000 J1 League. In 2004, he moved to Gamba Osaka. He played many matches as right side back and right side midfielder and the club won the champions 2005 J1 League first league champions in the club history. The club also won the 2nd place 2005 J.League Cup. In 2006, he moved to J2 League club Yokohama FC. However he could not play at all in the match and retired at the end of the 2006 season.

== Club statistics ==
Club performance			League		Cup		League Cup		Total	
Season	Club	League	Apps	Goals	Apps	Goals	Apps	Goals	Apps	Goals
Japan			League		Emperor's Cup		League Cup		Total	
1997	Kashiwa Reysol	J1 League	1	0	0	0	0	0	1	0
1998	Kashiwa Reysol	J1 League	15	3	0	0	1	0	16	3
1999	Kashiwa Reysol	J1 League	19	2	3	0	6	1	28	3
2000	Kashiwa Reysol	J1 League	28	5	2	0	1	0	31	5
2001	Kashiwa Reysol	J1 League	28	4	1	0	4	0	33	4
2002	Kashiwa Reysol	J1 League	25	1	1	0	6	0	32	1
2003	Kashiwa Reysol	J1 League	20	2	2	1	3	0	25	3
2004	Gamba Osaka	J1 League	19	0	2	0	7	1	28	1
2005	Gamba Osaka	J1 League	22	2	1	0	9	1	32	3
2006	Yokohama FC	J2 League	0	0	0	0	-		0	0
Career total			177	19	12	1	37	3	226	23
