= Wolnei Caio =

Brazilian footballer (born 1968)

Personal information
- Date of birth: August 10, 1968 (age 58)
- Place of birth: Roca Sales, Brazil
- Height: 1.74 m (5 ft 9 in)
- Position: Midfielder

Senior career*
Years	Team	Apps	(Gls)
1987–1993	Grêmio	222	(63)
1988	→ Juventus-SP (loan)		
1989	→ Juventude (loan)		
1994–1997	Portuguesa	142	(33)
1995	→ Kashiwa Reysol (loan)		
1997–1998	Cruzeiro	70	(1)
1999–2000	Botafogo		
2000	Juventude		
2001	Inter de Limeira		
2001–2002	Guarani		
2003	15 de Novembro		
2004–2007	Esportivo		
- * Club domestic league appearances and goals

Wolnei Caio (born 10 August 1968) is a Brazilian former professional footballer who played as a midfielder.

== Career statistics ==
Club performance			League		Cup		Total	
Season	Club	League	Apps	Goals	Apps	Goals	Apps	Goals
Japan			League		Emperor's Cup		Total	
1995	Kashiwa Reysol	J1 League	9	4	2	1	11	5
Total			9	4	2	1	11	5

== Honours ==
Grêmio

- Campeonato Gaúcho: 1990, 1993
- Supercopa do Brasil: 1990

Cruzeiro

- Campeonato Mineiro: 1998

Esportivo

- Copa FGF: 2004

Individual

- 1989 Campeonato Gaúcho top scorer: 10 goals
