= Yuji Yokoyama =

Japanese footballer and manager

Yuji Yokoyama 横山 雄次
Personal information
- Full name: Yuji Yokoyama
- Date of birth: July 6, 1969 (age 57)
- Place of birth: Saitama, Saitama, Japan
- Height: 1.77 m (5 ft 10 in)
- Position: Midfielder

Youth career
- 1985–1987: Bunan High School
- 1988–1991: Chuo University

Senior career*
Years	Team	Apps	(Gls)
1992–1997	Kashiwa Reysol		
1998	Avispa Fukuoka	18	(1)
1999–2000	Omiya Ardija	34	(2)
Total		52	(3)

Managerial career
- 2012: Blaublitz Akita
- 2016–2018: Tochigi SC
- 2019–2021: AC Nagano Parceiro
- 2022: FC Gifu
- * Club domestic league appearances and goals

Yuji Yokoyama (横山 雄次, Yokoyama Yūji; born July 6, 1969) is a former Japanese football player and manager.

== Playing career ==
Yokoyama was born in Saitama on July 6, 1969. After graduating from Chuo University, he joined Hitachi (later Kashiwa Reysol) in 1992. He played many matches as offensive midfielder and right side back from first season. In 1998, he moved to Avispa Fukuoka. In 1999, he moved to newly was promoted to J2 League club, Omiya Ardija based in his local. He retired end of 2000 season.

== Coaching career ==
After retirement, Yokoyama started coaching career at Omiya Ardija in 2001. He mainly coached for youth team until 2011. In 2012, he moved to Japan Football League club Blaublitz Akita and became a manager. He managed the club 1 season and the club finished at 13th place. In 2013, he moved to Shonan Bellmare and became a coach. In 2016, he moved to J3 League club Tochigi SC. The club won the 2nd place for 2 years in a row (2016-2017) and was promoted to J2 League from 2018. In 2018 season in J2, Tochigi SC finished at the 17th place of 22 clubs and he resigned end of 2018 season. In 2019, he signed with J3 club AC Nagano Parceiro.

== Career statistics ==
Appearances and goals by club, season and competition
Club	Season	League			Emperor's Cup		J.League Cup		Total	
Club	Season	Division	Apps	Goals	Apps	Goals	Apps	Goals	Apps	Goals
Hitachi	1992	Football League								
Kashiwa Reysol	1993	Football League	9	0			0	0	9	0
Kashiwa Reysol	1994	Football League	8	0			0	0	8	0
Kashiwa Reysol	1995	J1 League	22	2	1	0	—		23	2
Kashiwa Reysol	1996	J1 League	15	3	2	1	3	0	20	4
Kashiwa Reysol	1997	J1 League	16	2	0	0	1	0	17	2
Avispa Fukuoka	1998	J1 League	18	1			4	0	22	1
Omiya Ardija	1999	J2 League	20	2			2	0	22	2
Omiya Ardija	2000	J2 League	14	0			2	0	16	0
Career total			122	10	3	1	12	0	137	11

== Managerial statistics ==
Update; December 31, 2019

Team	From	To	Record				
Team	From	To	G	W	D	L	Win %
Blaublitz Akita	2012	2012	32	9	10	13	28.13
Tochigi SC	2016	2018	104	46	31	27	44.23
AC Nagano Parceiro	2019	present	34	13	10	11	38.24
Total			170	68	51	51	40.00
