= Shigenori Hagimura =

Japanese footballer

Shigenori Hagimura 萩村 滋則
Personal information
- Full name: Shigenori Hagimura
- Date of birth: July 31, 1976 (age 50)
- Place of birth: Mie, Japan
- Height: 1.83 m (6 ft 0 in)
- Position: Defender

Youth career
- 1992–1994: Yokkaichi Chuo Technical High School

College career
Years	Team	Apps	(Gls)
1995–1996	University of Tsukuba		

Senior career*
Years	Team	Apps	(Gls)
1997–2003	Kashiwa Reysol	147	(7)
2004	Kyoto Purple Sanga	19	(0)
2005	Albirex Niigata	28	(0)
2006–2008	Tokyo Verdy	56	(2)
Total		250	(9)

International career
1995	Japan U-20	1	(0)
Medal record
Kashiwa Reysol
Winner	J.League Cup	1999
- * Club domestic league appearances and goals

Shigenori Hagimura (萩村 滋則, Hagimura Shigenori; born July 31, 1976) is a former Japanese football player.

== Club career ==
Hagimura was born in Mie Prefecture on July 31, 1976. After he dropped out of the University of Tsukuba, he joined Kashiwa Reysol in 1997. In his first season, he played as a centre-back and became a regular in the line-up. He won his first championship, when the club won the 1999 J.League Cup. In 2000, he played as a defensive midfielder as well as a centre back. However, his opportunity to play decreased from 2001. He moved to Kyoto Purple Sanga in 2004 and Albirex Niigata in 2005. He was a regular at Albirex and then moved to Tokyo Verdy in 2006. In 2008, he appeared six times and retired at the end of the season.

== National team career ==
In April 1995, when Hagimura was a student at the University of Tsukuba, he was selected by the Japan U-20 national team for 1995 World Youth Championship. He played one match against Chile.

== Career statistics ==
Appearances and goals by club, season and competition
Club	Season	League			Emperor's Cup		J.League Cup		Asia		Total	
Club	Season	Division	Apps	Goals	Apps	Goals	Apps	Goals	Apps	Goals	Apps	Goals
Kashiwa Reysol	1997	J1 League	32	1	0	0	3	0	—		35	1
Kashiwa Reysol	1998	J1 League	26	1	2	0	0	0	—		28	1
Kashiwa Reysol	1999	J1 League	17	0	2	0	9	0	—		28	0
Kashiwa Reysol	2000	J1 League	30	2	2	0	2	0	—		34	2
Kashiwa Reysol	2001	J1 League	19	1	0	0	3	0	—		22	1
Kashiwa Reysol	2002	J1 League	12	0	0	0	6	0	—		18	0
Kashiwa Reysol	2003	J1 League	11	2	1	0	0	0	—		12	2
Kyoto Purple Sanga	2004	J2 League	19	0	1	0	—		—		20	0
Albirex Niigata	2005	J1 League	28	0	2	0	6	0	—		36	0
Tokyo Verdy	2006	J2 League	29	1	1	0	—		2	0	32	1
Tokyo Verdy	2007	J2 League	22	1	0	0	—		—		22	1
Tokyo Verdy	2008	J1 League	5	0	0	0	1	0	—		6	0
Career total			250	9	11	0	30	0	2	0	293	9
