= Kazuhisa Irii =

Japanese footballer

Kazuhisa Irii 入井 和久
Personal information
- Full name: Kazuhisa Irii
- Date of birth: October 18, 1970 (age 56)
- Place of birth: Ibaraki, Japan
- Height: 1.69 m (5 ft 6 1/2 in)
- Position: Defender

Youth career
- 1986–1988: Hitachi Technical High School

Senior career*
Years	Team	Apps	(Gls)
1989–1992	Honda	26	(0)
1992–1994	Kashima Antlers	6	(0)
1995	Kashiwa Reysol	2	(0)
1996–1997	Brummell Sendai	10	(0)
Total		44	(0)
Medal record
Honda
Runner-up	JSL Cup	1991
Kashima Antlers
Runner-up	J1 League	1993
Runner-up	Emperor's Cup	1993
- * Club domestic league appearances and goals

Kazuhisa Irii (入井 和久, Irii Kazuhisa; born October 18, 1970) is a Japanese former football player.

== Playing career ==
Irii was born in Ibaraki Prefecture on October 18, 1970. After graduating from high school, he joined Honda in 1989. He played often in 1991. He moved to Kashima Antlers in 1992. However he did not play as much. He moved to the newly promoted J1 League club, Kashiwa Reysol in 1995. However he still did not play much and he moved to the Japan Football League club Brummell Sendai in 1996. He retired at the end of the 1997 season.

== Club statistics ==
Club performance			League		Cup		League Cup		Total	
Season	Club	League	Apps	Goals	Apps	Goals	Apps	Goals	Apps	Goals
Japan			League		Emperor's Cup		J.League Cup		Total	
1989/90	Honda	JSL Division 1	0	0			0	0	0	0
1990/91	Honda	JSL Division 1	4	0			3	0	7	0
1991/92	Honda	JSL Division 1	22	0			4	0	26	0
1992	Kashima Antlers	J1 League	-		1	0	6	1	7	1
1993	Kashima Antlers	J1 League	6	0	0	0	2	0	8	0
1994	Kashima Antlers	J1 League	0	0	0	0	0	0	0	0
1995	Kashiwa Reysol	J1 League	2	0	0	0	-		2	0
1996	Brummell Sendai	Football League	8	0	3	0	-		11	0
1997	Brummell Sendai	Football League	2	0	2	0	0	0	4	0
Total			44	0	6	0	15	1	65	1
