= Shin Tanada =

Japanese footballer

Shin Tanada 棚田 伸
Personal information
- Full name: Shin Tanada
- Date of birth: July 25, 1969 (age 57)
- Place of birth: Hiroshima, Japan
- Height: 1.65 m (5 ft 5 in)
- Position: Midfielder

Youth career
- 1985–1987: Hiroshima Technical High School
- 1988–1991: Juntendo University

Senior career*
Years	Team	Apps	(Gls)
1992–1998	Kashiwa Reysol	120	(25)
1998–1999	Consadole Sapporo	40	(4)
Total		160	(29)
- * Club domestic league appearances and goals

Shin Tanada (棚田 伸, Tanada Shin; born July 25, 1969) is a former Japanese football player.

== Playing career ==
Tanada was born in Hiroshima on July 25, 1969. After graduating from Juntendo University, he joined Japan Football League club Hitachi (later Kashiwa Reysol) in 1992. He played many matches as offensive midfielder from first season. The club was promoted to J1 League from 1995 and he became a regular player in 1995 season. However he got hurt in late the season. Although he came back in 1996 season, his opportunity to play decreased. In October 1998, he moved to Consadole Sapporo. Although he played many matches for the club, he retired end of 1999 season.

== Career statistics ==
Appearances and goals by club, season and competition
Club	Season	League			Emperor's Cup		J.League Cup		Total	
Club	Season	Division	Apps	Goals	Apps	Goals	Apps	Goals	Apps	Goals
Hitachi	1992	Football League	16	2			—		16	2
Kashiwa Reysol	1993	Football League	18	3	1	0	6	0	25	3
Kashiwa Reysol	1994	Football League	17	2	0	0	0	0	17	2
Kashiwa Reysol	1995	J1 League	44	16	1	0	—		45	16
Kashiwa Reysol	1996	J1 League	2	0	2	0	0	0	4	0
Kashiwa Reysol	1997	J1 League	18	2	2	0	5	1	25	3
Kashiwa Reysol	1998	J1 League	5	0	0	0	0	0	5	0
Consadole Sapporo	1998	J1 League	8	3	3	1	0	0	11	4
Consadole Sapporo	1999	J2 League	32	1	1	0	2	0	35	1
Career total			160	29	10	1	13	1	183	31
