= Ryuji Kato =

Japanese footballer

Ryuji Kato 加藤 竜二
Personal information
- Full name: Ryuji Kato
- Date of birth: December 24, 1969 (age 56)
- Place of birth: Tokyo, Japan
- Height: 1.84 m (6 ft 1/2 in)
- Position: Goalkeeper

Youth career
- 1985–1987: Urawa Gakuin High School

Senior career*
Years	Team	Apps	(Gls)
1988–1991	Toho Titanium		
1991–1993	Tokyo Gas	60	(0)
1994	PJM Futures	28	(0)
1995–1997	Kashiwa Reysol	40	(0)
1998–1999	Consadole Sapporo	0	(0)
2000–2002	Sanfrecce Hiroshima	2	(0)
2002–2004	Sagawa Express Tokyo	52	(0)
2005–2007	Rosso Kumamoto	14	(0)
2014	Roasso Kumamoto	0	(0)
Total		196	(0)
- * Club domestic league appearances and goals

Ryuji Kato (加藤 竜二, Katō Ryūji; born December 24, 1969) is a former Japanese football player.

== Playing career ==
Kato was born in Tokyo on December 24, 1969. After graduating from high school, he joined Japan Soccer League (JSL) club Toho Titanium in 1988. He played as regular goalkeeper. In 1991, he moved to JSL club Tokyo Gas and played in 3 seasons. In 1994, he moved to Japan Football League club PJM Futures. In 1995, he moved to newly was promoted to J1 League club, Kashiwa Reysol. Although he played many matches in 1995, his opportunity to play decreased behind Yoichi Doi from 1996. In 1998, he moved to Consadole Sapporo. However he could hardly play in the match behind Dido Havenaar and Yohei Sato. In 2000, he moved to Sanfrecce Hiroshima. However he could hardly play in the match behind Takashi Shimoda. In May 2002, he moved to Japan Football League (JFL) club Sagawa Express Tokyo. He played many matches in 3 seasons. In 2005, he moved to Regional Leagues club Rosso Kumamoto (later Roasso Kumamoto). He played many matches in 2005 and the club was promoted to JFL from 2006. He also served a goalkeeper coach from 2006 and the club was promoted to J2 League end of 2007 season. He retired from playing career end of 2007 season. On April 18, 2014, he came back as player because multiple goalkeepers were injured. However he did not play in the match and his registration was deleted on April 25.

== Coaching career ==
In 2006, when Kato played for Rosso Kumamoto (later Roasso Kumamoto), he became a goalkeeper coach for the club. He coached until end of 2014 season. In 2015, he moved to JFA Academy Fukushima LSC and became a goalkeeper coach.

== Club statistics ==
Club performance			League		Cup		League Cup		Total	
Season	Club	League	Apps	Goals	Apps	Goals	Apps	Goals	Apps	Goals
Japan			League		Emperor's Cup		J.League Cup		Total	
1988/89	Toho Titanium	JSL Division 2								
1989/90	Toho Titanium	JSL Division 2	29	0	-		0	0	29	0
1990/91	Toho Titanium	JSL Division 2	30	0	-		1	0	31	0
1991/92	Tokyo Gas	JSL Division 2	24	0	-		1	0	25	0
1992	Tokyo Gas	Football League	18	0	-		-		18	0
1993	Tokyo Gas	Football League	18	0	-		-		18	0
1994	PJM Futures	Football League	28	0	1	0	-		29	0
1995	Kashiwa Reysol	J1 League	29	0	0	0	-		29	0
1996	Kashiwa Reysol	J1 League	1	0	0	0	0	0	1	0
1997	Kashiwa Reysol	J1 League	10	0	0	0	0	0	10	0
1998	Consadole Sapporo	J1 League	0	0	3	0	1	0	4	0
1999	Consadole Sapporo	J2 League	0	0	0	0	0	0	0	0
2000	Sanfrecce Hiroshima	J1 League	0	0	0	0	0	0	0	0
2001	Sanfrecce Hiroshima	J1 League	2	0	0	0	0	0	2	0
2002	Sanfrecce Hiroshima	J1 League	0	0	0	0	0	0	0	0
2002	Sagawa Express Tokyo	Football League	11	0	-		-		11	0
2003	Sagawa Express Tokyo	Football League	28	0	3	0	-		31	0
2004	Sagawa Express Tokyo	Football League	13	0	1	0	-		14	0
2005	Rosso Kumamoto	Regional Leagues	14	0	1	0	-		15	0
2006	Rosso Kumamoto	Football League	0	0	0	0	-		0	0
2007	Rosso Kumamoto	Football League	0	0	0	0	-		0	0
2014	Roasso Kumamoto	J2 League	0	0	0	0	-		0	0
Total			255	0	8	0	3	0	266	0
