= Valdir Benedito =

Brazilian footballer

Personal information
- Full name: Valdir Benedito
- Date of birth: October 25, 1965 (age 60)
- Place of birth: Araraquara, Brazil
- Height: 1.72 m (5 ft 8 in)
- Position: Midfielder

Senior career*
Years	Team	Apps	(Gls)
1986	Ferroviária		
1987–1988	Platinense-PR		
1988	Internacional		
1989	Platinense-PR		
1990–1992	Atlético Paranaense		
1992–1995	Atlético Mineiro		
1995–1997	Kashiwa Reysol		
1998	Cruzeiro		
1999–2001	Atlético Mineiro		
2001	Atlético Paranaense		
2001	Avaí		
2002	América Mineiro		
2002	São Raimundo-AM		
2003	Internacional-SP		

International career
1991	Brazil	3	(0)
- * Club domestic league appearances and goals

Valdir Benedito (born 25 October 1965) is a retired Brazilian footballer who played as a midfielder for Atlético Paranaense (Brazil), Atlético Mineiro (Brazil), Cruzeiro (Brazil), Internacional (Brazil) and Kashiwa Reysol (Japan).

== Club career ==
Born in Araraquara, Valdir began playing football with local side Associação Ferroviária de Esportes.

== International career ==
Valdir was a participant at the 1991 Copa América in Chile, and was capped 3 times for the Brazil national team in 1991.

== Career statistics ==
=== Club ===
Club performance			League		Cup		League Cup		Total	
Season	Club	League	Apps	Goals	Apps	Goals	Apps	Goals	Apps	Goals
Japan			League		Emperor's Cup		J.League Cup		Total	
1995	Kashiwa Reysol	J1 League	27	7	1	0	-		28	7
1996	Kashiwa Reysol	J1 League	17	3	2	0	13	1	32	4
1997	Kashiwa Reysol	J1 League	24	1	3	0	2	0	29	1
Total			68	11	6	0	15	1	89	12

=== International ===
Brazil national team
Year	Apps	Goals
1991	3	0
Total	3	0
