= 豪志 =

豪志, meaning 'excellent, will', may refer to:

- Goshi, a given name for Japanese politician Goshi Hosono (born 1971)
- Haozhi, a given name for Zhao Haozhi (born 1965), the former mayor of Dongying, Shandong province, People's Republic of China

== See also ==
- Goshi (disambiguation)
