= Yuji Okuma =

Japanese footballer and manager

Yuji Okuma 大熊 裕司
Personal information
- Full name: Yuji Okuma
- Date of birth: January 19, 1969 (age 57)
- Place of birth: Saitama, Saitama, Japan
- Height: 1.73 m (5 ft 8 in)
- Position: Midfielder

Team information
- Current team: Tegevajaro Miyazaki (manager)

Youth career
- 1984–1986: Bunan High School

College career
Years	Team	Apps	(Gls)
1987–1990	Chuo University		

Senior career*
Years	Team	Apps	(Gls)
1991–1995	Kashiwa Reysol	92	(7)
1996–1997	Kyoto Purple Sanga	50	(1)
1998	Avispa Fukuoka	21	(0)
Total		163	(8)

Managerial career
- 2014: Cerezo Osaka
- 2016–2019: Cerezo Osaka U-23
- 2024-: Tegevajaro Miyazaki
- * Club domestic league appearances and goals

Yuji Okuma (大熊 裕司, Okuma Yuji; born January 19, 1969) is a former Japanese football player and manager. His elder brother Kiyoshi is also a former footballer.

== Playing career ==
Okuma was born in Saitama on January 19, 1969. After graduating from Chuo University, he joined Hitachi (later Kashiwa Reysol) in 1991. He played many matches as defensive midfielder from first season. In 1996, he moved to newly was promoted to J1 League club, Kyoto Purple Sanga. He played many matches in 1996 and he became a regular player in 1997. In 1998, he moved to Avispa Fukuoka and played in 1 season. He retired end of 1998 season.

== Coaching career ==
After retirement, Okuma started coaching career at Avispa Fukuoka in 1999. In 2005, he moved to Cerezo Osaka and served as coach. In 2007, he became a coach for Japan U-20 national team. In 2010, he returned to Cerezo Osaka and became a manager for youth team. In September 2014, top team manager Marco Pezzaiuoli was sacked for poor results. Okuma became a new manager as Pezzaiuoli successor. However Cerezo finished at the 17th place of 18 clubs in 2014 season. Cerezo was relegated to J2 League and Okuma resigned a manager. In 2015, he became a manager for youth team. In 2016, he became a manager for new team Cerezo Osaka U-23.

== Club statistics ==
Club performance			League		Cup		League Cup		Total	
Season	Club	League	Apps	Goals	Apps	Goals	Apps	Goals	Apps	Goals
Japan			League		Emperor's Cup		J.League Cup		Total	
1991/92	Hitachi	JSL Division 1	16	0					16	0
1992	Hitachi	Football League	16	1			-		16	1
1993	Kashiwa Reysol	Football League	16	2	1	0	6	0	23	2
1994	Kashiwa Reysol	Football League	20	4	0	0	0	0	20	4
1995	Kashiwa Reysol	J1 League	24	0	0	0	-		24	0
1996	Kyoto Purple Sanga	J1 League	19	0	2	0	13	1	34	1
1997	Kyoto Purple Sanga	J1 League	31	1	2	0	5	0	38	1
1998	Avispa Fukuoka	J1 League	21	0	3	1	4	0	28	1
Total			163	8	8	1	28	1	199	10

== Managerial statistics ==
Update; December 31, 2018

Team	From	To	Record				
Team	From	To	G	W	D	L	Win %
Cerezo Osaka	2014	2014	12	3	2	7	25.00
Cerezo Osaka U-23	2016	present	94	29	26	39	30.85
Total			106	32	28	46	30.19
