= Nelsinho (footballer, born 1962) =

Brazilian footballer

Personal information
- Full name: Nélson Luís Kerchner
- Date of birth: 31 December 1962 (age 63)
- Place of birth: São Paulo, Brazil
- Height: 1.79 m (5 ft 10 in)
- Position: Defender

Youth career
- São Paulo

Senior career*
Years	Team	Apps	(Gls)
1979–1992	São Paulo	134	(1)
1991	→ Flamengo (loan)	7	(0)
1992	Corinthians	11	(0)
1993–1995	Kashiwa Reysol	86	(16)

International career
1987–1990	Brazil	17	(1)

Managerial career
- 2004: Inter de Limeira
Medal record
Men's football
Representing Brazil
Pan American Games
Gold medal – first place	1987 Indianapolis	Team competition
- * Club domestic league appearances and goals

Nélson Luís Kerchner (born 31 December 1962 in São Paulo, Brazil), nicknamed Nelsinho, is a retired Brazilian footballer who played as a defender. He played for the Brazil national team at the 1987 Copa América in Argentina.

== Career statistics ==
=== Club ===
Club performance			League	
Season	Club	League	Apps	Goals
Brazil			League	
1981	São Paulo	Série A	9	0
1982	São Paulo	Série A	3	0
1983	São Paulo	Série A	22	0
1984	São Paulo	Série A	13	0
1985	São Paulo	Série A	19	0
1986	São Paulo	Série A	29	1
1987	São Paulo	Série A	9	0
1988	São Paulo	Série A	13	0
1989	São Paulo	Série A	17	0
1990	Flamengo	Série A	7	0
1991	Flamengo	Série A	0	0
1992	São Paulo	Série A	11	0
1992	Corinthians Paulista	Série A	0	0
Japan			League	
1993	Kashiwa Reysol	Football League	16	2
1994	Kashiwa Reysol	Football League	29	8
1995	Kashiwa Reysol	J1 League	41	6
Country	Brazil		152	1
Country	Japan		86	16
Total			238	17

=== International ===
Brazil national team
Year	Apps	Goals
1987	11	1
1988	4	0
1989	1	0
1990	1	0
Total	17	1
