= Shinichiro Tani =

Japanese footballer

Shinichiro Tani 谷 真一郎
Personal information
- Full name: Shinichiro Tani
- Date of birth: November 13, 1968 (age 57)
- Place of birth: Aichi, Japan
- Height: 1.70 m (5 ft 7 in)
- Position: Forward

Youth career
- 1984–1986: Nishiharu High School
- 1987–1990: University of Tsukuba

Senior career*
Years	Team	Apps	(Gls)
1991–1995	Kashiwa Reysol	59	(11)
Total		59	(11)

International career
1990	Japan	1	(0)
- * Club domestic league appearances and goals

Shinichiro Tani (谷 真一郎, Tani Shinichiro; born November 13, 1968) is a former Japanese football player. He played for Japan national team.

== Club career ==
Tani was born in Aichi Prefecture on November 13, 1968. After graduating from University of Tsukuba, he joined Hitachi (later Kashiwa Reysol) in 1991. The club won the 2nd place in 1992 and 1994 Japan Football League. The club was promoted to J1 League from 1995. He retired end of 1995 season.

== National team career ==
On July 27, 1990, Tani debuted for Japan national team against South Korea.

== Club statistics ==
Club performance			League		Cup		League Cup		Total	
Season	Club	League	Apps	Goals	Apps	Goals	Apps	Goals	Apps	Goals
Japan			League		Emperor's Cup		J.League Cup		Total	
1991/92	Hitachi	JSL Division 1	21	3			3	1	24	4
1992	Hitachi	Football League	17	7			-		17	7
1993	Kashiwa Reysol	Football League	9	0	1	0	5	1	15	1
1994	Kashiwa Reysol	Football League	10	1	0	0	0	0	10	1
1995	Kashiwa Reysol	J1 League	2	0	0	0	-		2	0
Total			59	11	1	0	8	2	68	13

== National team statistics ==
Japan national team
Year	Apps	Goals
1990	1	0
Total	1	0
