= Takashi Kojima =

Japanese footballer

Takashi Kojima 小島 卓
Personal information
- Full name: Takashi Kojima
- Date of birth: August 4, 1973 (age 53)
- Place of birth: Shiga, Japan
- Height: 1.78 m (5 ft 10 in)
- Position: Defender

Youth career
- 1989–1991: Tokai University Daiichi High School
- 1992–1994: Kindai University

Senior career*
Years	Team	Apps	(Gls)
1995–1998	Kashiwa Reysol	4	(0)
1999–2000	Vissel Kobe	12	(0)
Total		16	(0)
- * Club domestic league appearances and goals

Takashi Kojima (小島 卓, Kojima Takashi; born August 4, 1973) is a former Japanese football player.

== Playing career ==
Kojima was born in Shiga Prefecture on August 4, 1973. After he dropped out from Kindai University, he joined the J1 League club, Kashiwa Reysol, in June 1995. In 1999, he moved to Vissel Kobe. He played 12 matches in 2 seasons and he retired at the end of the 2000 season.

After retirement he became a scout, and in 2016 he became the chief scout for Kyoto Sanga F.C..

== Career statistics ==
Appearances and goals by club, season and competition
Club	Season	League			Emperor's Cup		J.League Cup		Total	
Club	Season	Division	Apps	Goals	Apps	Goals	Apps	Goals	Apps	Goals
Kashiwa Reysol	1995	J1 League	0	0	0	0	—		0	0
Kashiwa Reysol	1996	J1 League	3	0	0	0	2	0	5	0
Kashiwa Reysol	1997	J1 League	0	0	3	0	1	0	4	0
Kashiwa Reysol	1998	J1 League	1	0	0	0	0	0	1	0
Vissel Kobe	1999	J1 League	5	0	1	0	0	0	6	0
Vissel Kobe	2000	J1 League	7	0	0	0	2	0	9	0
Career total			16	0	4	0	5	0	25	0
