= Kentaro Sawada =

Japanese footballer

Kentaro Sawada 沢田 謙太郎
Personal information
- Full name: Kentaro Sawada
- Date of birth: May 15, 1970 (age 56)
- Place of birth: Kamakura, Kanagawa, Japan
- Height: 1.70 m (5 ft 7 in)
- Positions: Midfielder; defender

Youth career
- 1986–1988: Fujisawa Nishi High School
- 1989–1992: Chuo University

Senior career*
Years	Team	Apps	(Gls)
1993–1998	Kashiwa Reysol	168	(7)
1999–2003	Sanfrecce Hiroshima	111	(8)
Total		279	(15)

International career
1995–1996	Japan	4	(0)

Managerial career
- 2021: Sanfrecce Hiroshima (interim)
- * Club domestic league appearances and goals

Kentaro Sawada (沢田 謙太郎, Sawada Kentaro; born May 15, 1970) is a former Japanese football player. He played for Japan national team.

== Club career ==
Sawada was born in Kamakura on May 15, 1970. After graduating from Chuo University, he joined Japan Football League club Kashiwa Reysol in 1993. He played as right-midfielder and right side-back. The club won the 2nd place in 1994 and was promoted to J1 League. He moved to Sanfrecce Hiroshima in 1999. He retired at the end of the 2003 season.

== National team career ==
On September 20, 1995, Sawada debuted for Japan national team against Paraguay. He also played in 1996. He played four games for Japan until 1996.

== Career statistics ==
=== Club ===
Appearances and goals by club, season and competition
Club	Season	League			Emperor's Cup		J.League Cup		Total	
Club	Season	Division	Apps	Goals	Apps	Goals	Apps	Goals	Apps	Goals
Kashiwa Reysol	1993	Football League	12	2	1	0	6	0	19	2
Kashiwa Reysol	1994	Football League	30	3	0	0	1	0	31	3
Kashiwa Reysol	1995	J1 League	43	0	2	0	-		45	0
Kashiwa Reysol	1996	J1 League	23	1	2	0	4	0	29	1
Kashiwa Reysol	1997	J1 League	30	0	3	0	8	0	41	0
Kashiwa Reysol	1998	J1 League	30	1	2	0	4	0	36	1
Sanfrecce Hiroshima	1999	J1 League	29	3	4	0	4	1	37	4
Sanfrecce Hiroshima	2000	J1 League	30	3	2	0	1	0	33	3
Sanfrecce Hiroshima	2001	J1 League	24	0	2	0	5	0	31	0
Sanfrecce Hiroshima	2002	J1 League	26	2	1	0	5	0	32	2
Sanfrecce Hiroshima	2003	J2 League	2	0	0	0	-		2	0
Total			279	15	19	0	38	1	236	16

=== International ===
Japan national team
Year	Apps	Goals
1995	2	0
1996	2	0
Total	4	0
