= Shin Won-ho (footballer) =

South Korean footballer

Personal information
- Date of birth: 19 May 2001 (age 25)
- Place of birth: South Korea Goyang
- Height: 1.76 m (5 ft 9 in)
- Position: Defender

Team information
- Current team: Cheonan City
- Number: 21

Youth career
- 2012–2013: Muwon Elementary School
- 2014–2016: Gunpo Middle School
- 2017–2019: Boin High School
- 2020–2021: Gamba Osaka

Senior career*
Years	Team	Apps	(Gls)
2020	Gamba Osaka U-23	6	(0)
2021–2022	Gamba Osaka	0	(0)
2022	Suwon Samsung Bluewings	0	(0)
2023–	Cheonan City	0	(0)

International career^{‡}
2018	South Korea U18		
2019	South Korea U19		
- * Club domestic league appearances and goals as of 20:30, 24 June 2022 (UTC) ‡ National team caps and goals as of 7:04, 17 March 2021 (UTC)

- Shin Won-ho
- Hangul: 신원호
- RR: Sin Wonho
- MR: Sin Wŏnho

Shin Won-ho (Korean: 신원호; born 19 May 2001) is a South Korean professional footballer who plays as a left-back for K League 2 club Cheonan City.

== Career statistics ==
=== Club ===
As of 24 June 2022.

Club	Season	League			National Cup		League Cup		Other		Total	
Club	Season	Division	Apps	Goals	Apps	Goals	Apps	Goals	Apps	Goals	Apps	Goals
Gamba Osaka U-23	2020	J3 League	6	0	–		–		0	0	6	0
Gamba Osaka	2021	J1 League	0	0	1 (Note: Appearances in the Emperor's Cup)	0	0	0	0	0	1	0
Gamba Osaka	2022	J1 League	0	0	0	0	1 (Note: Appearances in the J.League Cup)	0	0	0	1	0
Suwon Samsung Bluewings	2022	K League 1	0	0	0 (Note: Appearances in the Korean FA Cup)	0	0	0	0	0	0	0
Career total			6	0	1	0	1	0	0	0	8	0
