= Hirokazu Goshi =

Japanese footballer

Hirokazu Goshi 郷司 弘和
Personal information
- Full name: Hirokazu Goshi
- Date of birth: December 19, 1966 (age 59)
- Place of birth: Shizuoka, Japan
- Height: 1.75 m (5 ft 9 in)
- Position: Goalkeeper

Youth career
- 1982–1984: Tokai University Daiichi High School

Senior career*
Years	Team	Apps	(Gls)
1985–1995	Kashiwa Reysol		
- * Club domestic league appearances and goals

Hirokazu Goshi (郷司 弘和, Goshi Hirokazu; born December 19, 1966) is a former Japanese football player.

== Playing career ==
Goshi was born in Shizuoka Prefecture on December 19, 1966. After graduating from high school, he joined Japan Soccer League club Hitachi (later Kashiwa Reysol) in 1985. In 1992, Japan Soccer League was folded and the club joined new league, Japan Football League. In 1994, the club won second place and was promoted to the J1 League. He played as goalkeeper for the club for 11 seasons until 1995, and then retired at the end of that season.

== Club statistics ==
Club performance			League		Cup		League Cup		Total	
Season	Club	League	Apps	Goals	Apps	Goals	Apps	Goals	Apps	Goals
Japan			League		Emperor's Cup		J.League Cup		Total	
1985/86	Hitachi	JSL Division 1								
1986/87	Hitachi	JSL Division 1								
1987/88	Hitachi	JSL Division 2								
1988/89	Hitachi	JSL Division 2								
1989/90	Hitachi	JSL Division 1								
1990/91	Hitachi	JSL Division 2								
1991/92	Hitachi	JSL Division 1								
1992	Hitachi	Football League								
1993	Kashiwa Reysol	Football League	1	0			2	0	3	0
1994	Kashiwa Reysol	Football League	4	0			0	0	4	0
1995	Kashiwa Reysol	J1 League	4	0	0	0	-		4	0
Total			9	0	0	0	2	0	11	0
