= Kenichi Sugano =

Japanese footballer

Kenichi Sugano 菅野 賢一
Personal information
- Full name: Kenichi Sugano
- Date of birth: August 8, 1971 (age 55)
- Place of birth: Mie, Japan
- Height: 1.70 m (5 ft 7 in)
- Positions: Defender; forward

Youth career
- 1987–1989: Yokkaichi Chuo Technical High School
- 1990–1993: Chuo University

Senior career*
Years	Team	Apps	(Gls)
1994–1996	Kashiwa Reysol	37	(6)
1997–1999	Kawasaki Frontale	12	(2)
2000–2001	Mito HollyHock	35	(0)
2001–2004	Gunma FC Horikoshi		
Total		84	(8)
- * Club domestic league appearances and goals

Kenichi Sugano (菅野 賢一, Sugano Kenichi; born August 8, 1971) is a former Japanese football player.

== Playing career ==
Sugano was born in Mie Prefecture on August 8, 1971. After graduating from Chuo University, he joined Kashiwa Reysol in 1994. He played many matches as forward in 3 seasons. In 1997, he moved to Kawasaki Frontale. However he could hardly play in the match. In 2000, he moved to newly was promoted to J2 League club, Mito HollyHock. He played many matches as left side back and left midfielder. In October 2001, he moved to Prefectural Leagues club Gunma FC Fortona (later Gunma FC Horikoshi). The club was promoted to Regional Leagues in 2003 and Japan Football League in 2004. He retired at the end of the 2004 season.

== Club statistics ==
Club performance			League		Cup		League Cup		Total	
Season	Club	League	Apps	Goals	Apps	Goals	Apps	Goals	Apps	Goals
Japan			League		Emperor's Cup		J.League Cup		Total	
1994	Kashiwa Reysol	Football League	2	0	0	0	0	0	2	0
1995	Kashiwa Reysol	J1 League	26	4	0	0	-		26	4
1996	Kashiwa Reysol	J1 League	9	2	0	0	4	0	13	2
1997	Kawasaki Frontale	Football League	10	2	1	0	0	0	11	2
1998	Kawasaki Frontale	Football League	0	0	2	0	2	0	4	0
1999	Kawasaki Frontale	J2 League	2	0	0	0	0	0	2	0
2000	Mito HollyHock	J2 League	24	0	3	0	2	0	29	0
2001	Mito HollyHock	J2 League	11	0	0	0	1	0	12	0
2001	Gunma FC Fortona	Prefectural Leagues			1	0	-		1	0
2002	Gunma FC Horikoshi	Regional Leagues			1	0	-		1	0
2003	Gunma FC Horikoshi	Regional Leagues			0	0	-		0	0
2004	Gunma FC Horikoshi	Football League	15	1	1	0	-		16	1
Total			99	9	9	0	9	0	117	9
