= Kenji Oba =

Japanese footballer

Kenji Oba 大場 健史
Personal information
- Full name: Kenji Oba
- Date of birth: August 14, 1967 (age 59)
- Place of birth: Kanagawa, Japan
- Height: 1.74 m (5 ft 8 1/2 in)
- Position: Defender

Youth career
- 1983–1985: Asahi High School

Senior career*
Years	Team	Apps	(Gls)
1986–1991	Nissan Motors	0	(0)
1991–1994	Kashima Antlers	50	(2)
1995–1996	Kashiwa Reysol	28	(1)
1997–1998	Kawasaki Frontale	28	(0)
Total		106	(3)
Medal record
Nissan Motors
Winner	Japan Soccer League	1988/89
Winner	Japan Soccer League	1989/90
Runner-up	Japan Soccer League	1990/91
Winner	JSL Cup	1988
Winner	JSL Cup	1989
Winner	JSL Cup	1990
Runner-up	JSL Cup	1986
Winner	Emperor's Cup	1988
Winner	Emperor's Cup	1989
Runner-up	Emperor's Cup	1990
Kashima Antlers
Runner-up	J1 League	1993
Runner-up	Emperor's Cup	1993
- * Club domestic league appearances and goals

Kenji Oba (大場 健史, Ōba Kenji; born August 14, 1967) is a former Japanese football player. He used his name "大場 賢治" until April 1994.

== Playing career ==
Oba was born in Kanagawa Prefecture on August 14, 1967. After graduating from high school, he joined Japan Soccer League club Nissan Motors in 1986. However he could not play at all in the game. He moved to Sumitomo Metal (later Kashima Antlers) in 1991. He played many matches. In 1992, Japan Soccer League was folded and founded new league J1 League. The club won the 2nd place 1993 J1 League and 1993 Emperor's Cup. He moved to newly promoted to J1 League club, Kashiwa Reysol in 1995. Although he played many matches in 1995, his opportunity to play decreased in 1996. In 1997, he moved to Japan Football League club Kawasaki Frontale. He lost opportunity to play in 1998 and retired end of 1998 season.

== Club statistics ==
Club performance			League		Cup		League Cup		Total	
Season	Club	League	Apps	Goals	Apps	Goals	Apps	Goals	Apps	Goals
Japan			League		Emperor's Cup		J.League Cup		Total	
1986/87	Nissan Motors	JSL Division 1	0	0					0	0
1987/88	Nissan Motors	JSL Division 1	0	0					0	0
1988/89	Nissan Motors	JSL Division 1	0	0					0	0
1989/90	Nissan Motors	JSL Division 1	0	0			0	0	0	0
1990/91	Nissan Motors	JSL Division 1	0	0			0	0	0	0
1991/92	Sumitomo Metal	JSL Division 2	28	2			2	0	30	2
1992	Kashima Antlers	J1 League	-		3	0	10	1	13	1
1993	Kashima Antlers	J1 League	9	0	5	0	1	0	15	0
1994	Kashima Antlers	J1 League	13	0	0	0	0	0	13	0
1995	Kashiwa Reysol	J1 League	24	1	0	0	-		24	1
1996	Kashiwa Reysol	J1 League	4	0	0	0	11	0	15	0
1997	Kawasaki Frontale	Football League	27	0	3	0	-		30	0
1998	Kawasaki Frontale	Football League	1	0	0	0	1	0	2	0
Total			106	3	11	0	25	1	142	4
