= Koichi Hashimoto (footballer) =

Japanese footballer

Koichi Hashimoto 橋本 幸一
Personal information
- Full name: Koichi Hashimoto
- Date of birth: January 13, 1969 (age 57)
- Place of birth: Japan
- Height: 1.70 m (5 ft 7 in)
- Position: Midfielder

Senior career*
Years	Team	Apps	(Gls)
1984–1989	XV Novembro-Jaú		
1990–1992	Central		
1993–1994	Corinthians Paulista		
1995	Kashiwa Reysol	0	(0)
1997	Fukushima FC		
1999	Juazeiro		
2001	Paraná		
2001–2002	Santa Cruz		
2002–2003	Luziânia		
- * Club domestic league appearances and goals

Koichi Hashimoto (橋本 幸一, Hashimoto Koichi; born January 13, 1969) is a former Japanese football player.

== Playing career ==
Hashimoto was born on January 13, 1969. In 1984, when he was 15 years old, he moved to Brazil and joined XV Novembro-Jaú, eventually becoming champion of Campeonato Paulista Juvenil (U-17). In his debut as a professional, he scored an assist against Clube Atlético Juventus.

In the early 1990s, he drifted between teams like Comercial Esporte Clube, Central and even returned to japan to play for JEF United Chiba, and then went back to Brazil to play for Nacional Futebol Clube.

Koichi would eventually join Brazilian team SC Corinthians Paulista, starting in two friendlies at the beginning of the 1994 season. He became great friends with players like Viola and Walter Casagrande.

In July 1995, he returned to Japan and he joined the newly promoted J1 League club Kashiwa Reysol and played in one season. In 1997, he joined the Japan Football League club Fukushima FC. However, the club was disbanded at the end of the 1997 season due to financial strain. From 1999, he played for the Brazilian clubs Juazeiro, Paraná, Santa Cruz, and Luziânia, and also American club San Jose Earthquakes. He retired at the end of the 2003 season.

== Post-Football Career ==
After retiring from football, Koichi became a sports agent an executive director of BBA Promotion. He, alongside Sérgio Echigo, was among the Corinthians supporters in the final against Chelsea at the 2013 FIFA Club World Cup.
