= Nobutaka Tanaka =

Japanese footballer and manager

Nobutaka Tanaka 田中 信孝
Personal information
- Full name: Nobutaka Tanaka
- Date of birth: June 10, 1971 (age 55)
- Place of birth: Saitama, Japan
- Height: 1.82 m (5 ft 11 1/2 in)
- Position: Defender

Youth career
- 1987–1989: Bunan High School
- 1990–1993: Tokyo University of Agriculture

Senior career*
Years	Team	Apps	(Gls)
1994–1996	Kashiwa Reysol	28	(0)
1996–1997	Brummel Sendai	9	(0)
Total		37	(0)

Managerial career
- 2005–2006: Sagawa Express Tokyo
- 2008: Sagawa Shiga
- * Club domestic league appearances and goals

Nobutaka Tanaka (田中 信孝, Tanaka Nobutaka; born June 10, 1971) is a former Japanese football player and manager.

== Playing career ==
Tanaka was born in Saitama Prefecture on June 10, 1971. After graduating from Tokyo University of Agriculture, he joined Kashiwa Reysol in 1994. In 1995, he played many matches as defensive midfielder with Takahiro Shimotaira. However he could not play at all in the match in 1996. In 1996, he moved to Japan Football League club Brummel Sendai. He retired at the end of the 1997 season.

== Coaching career ==
After retirement, Tanaka became a manager for Sagawa Express Tokyo (later Sagawa Shiga) in 2005. He managed the club in 2 seasons. In 2007, Sagawa Express Tokyo became new team; Sagawa Shiga merged with Sagawa Express Osaka. Then he became a coach for Sagawa Shiga. In 2008, he became a manager for the club. However the club results were bad and he was sacked in October.

== Club statistics ==
Club performance			League		Cup		League Cup		Total	
Season	Club	League	Apps	Goals	Apps	Goals	Apps	Goals	Apps	Goals
Japan			League		Emperor's Cup		J.League Cup		Total	
1994	Kashiwa Reysol	Football League	0	0					0	0
1995	Kashiwa Reysol	J1 League	28	0	0	0	-		28	0
1996	Kashiwa Reysol	J1 League	0	0			0	0	0	0
1996	Brummel Sendai	Football League	0	0			-		0	0
1997	Brummel Sendai	Football League	9	0			5	0	14	0
Total			37	0	0	0	5	0	42	0
