= Tomohiro Katanosaka =

Japanese footballer and manager

Tomohiro Katanosaka 片野坂 知宏
Personal information
- Date of birth: 18 April 1971 (age 55)
- Place of birth: Kagoshima, Japan
- Height: 1.71 m (5 ft 7 1/2 in)
- Position: Defender

Youth career
- 1987–1989: Kagoshima Jitsugyo High School

Senior career*
Years	Team	Apps	(Gls)
1990–1995	Sanfrecce Hiroshima	95	(5)
1995–1999	Kashiwa Reysol	103	(8)
2000–2003	Oita Trinita	14	(0)
2000–2001	→ Gamba Osaka (loan)	10	(0)
2002	→ Vegalta Sendai (loan)	15	(0)
Total		237	(13)

Managerial career
- 2016–2021: Oita Trinita
- 2022: Gamba Osaka
- 2024–2025: Oita Trinita
- 2026–: Roasso Kumamoto
Medal record
Sanfrecce Hiroshima
Runner-up	J1 League	1994
Runner-up	Emperor's Cup	1995
Kashiwa Reysol
Winner	J.League Cup	1999
- * Club domestic league appearances and goals

Tomohiro Katanosaka (片野坂 知宏, Katanosaka Tomohiro; born 18 April 1971) is a Japanese professional football manager and former player. He's currently manage Roasso Kumamoto.

== Playing career ==
Katanosaka was born in Kagoshima on April 18, 1971. After graduating from high school, he joined Mazda (later Sanfrecce Hiroshima) in 1990. From 1991, he became a regular player as left side back. In 1994, the club won the 2nd place in J1 League. In 1995, however his opportunity to play decreased Ryuji Michiki and he moved to Kashiwa Reysol in July. He played as regular player and the club won the champions 1999 J.League Cup. However his opportunity to play decreased behind Tomonori Hirayama in late 1999. In 2000, he moved to Oita Trinita. However he could hardly play in the match and he moved to Gamba Osaka on loan in August. He played at Gamba until 2001 and he moved to Vegalta Sendai on loan in 2002. In 2003, he returned to Trinita and he retired at the end of the 2003 season.

== Coaching career ==
After retirement, Katanosaka started coaching career at Oita Trinita in 2004. In 2007, he moved to Gamba Osaka and became a coach. The club won the champions 2007 J.League Cup, 2008 and 2009 Emperor's Cup. In 2010, he moved to his first club Sanfrecce Hiroshima became a coach. The club won the champions 2012 and 2013 J1 League. In 2014, he moved to Gamba Osaka again. In 2014, the club won the champions all three major title in Japan J1 League, J.League Cup and Emperor's Cup. In 2015, the club won Emperor's Cup for 2 years in a row. In 2016, he moved to Oita Trinita and became a manager. In 2016, although Trinita played in J3 League, he led Trinita to won the champions and was promoted to J2 League. In 2018 season, Trinita won the 2nd place in J2 and was promoted to J1.

== Club statistics ==
Appearances and goals by club, season and competition
Club	Season	League			Emperor's Cup		J. League Cup		Total	
Club	Season	Division	Apps	Goals	Apps	Goals	Apps	Goals	Apps	Goals
Mazda	1990–91	JSL Division 2	0	0			0	0	0	0
Mazda	1991–92	JSL Division 1	20	1			4	0	24	1
Sanfrecce Hiroshima	1992	J1 League	-		0	0	9	0	9	0
Sanfrecce Hiroshima	1993	J1 League	35	3	4	0	6	0	45	3
Sanfrecce Hiroshima	1994	J1 League	34	0	3	0	1	0	38	0
Sanfrecce Hiroshima	1995	J1 League	6	1	0	0	-		6	1
Kashiwa Reysol	1995	J1 League	11	0	2	0	-		13	0
Kashiwa Reysol	1996	J1 League	25	3	2	0	12	0	39	3
Kashiwa Reysol	1997	J1 League	25	2	3	1	8	1	36	4
Kashiwa Reysol	1998	J1 League	27	0	2	0	4	0	33	0
Kashiwa Reysol	1999	J1 League	15	3	0	0	5	0	20	3
Oita Trinita	2000	J2 League	5	0	0	0	1	0	6	0
Gamba Osaka	2000	J1 League	0	0	3	0	0	0	3	0
Gamba Osaka	2001	J1 League	10	0	0	0	1	0	11	0
Vegalta Sendai	2002	J1 League	15	0	2	1	4	0	21	1
Oita Trinita	2003	J1 League	9	0	0	0	2	0	11	0
Total			237	13	21	2	57	1	315	16

== Managerial statistics ==
Updated 14 August 2022

Team	From	To	Record				
Team	From	To	G	W	D	L	Win %
Oita Trinita	2016	2021	251	105	58	88	41.83
Gamba Osaka	2022	2022	33	8	9	16	24.24
Total			284	113	67	104	39.79

== Honours ==
=== Player ===
Kashiwa Reysol

- J.League Cup (1): 1999

=== Manager ===
Oita Trinita

- J3 League (1): 2016

Individual

- J.League Manager of the Year: 2019
