= 2008 Gamba Osaka season =

Gamba Osaka
2008 season
- Manager: Akira Nishino
- Stadium: Osaka Expo '70 Stadium
- J. League 1: 8th
- Emperor's Cup: Champions
- J. League Cup: Semifinals
- AFC Champions League: Champions
- FIFA Club World Cup: 3rd
- Pan-Pacific Championship: Champions
- Suruga Bank Championship: Runners-up
- Top goalscorer: Baré (10)
Home colours	Away colours	International colours

2008 Gamba Osaka season

== Competitions ==
Competitions	Position
J. League 1	8th / 18 clubs
Emperor's Cup	Champions
J. League Cup	Semifinals

== Domestic results ==
=== J. League 1 ===
Pos	Team	Pld	W	D	L	GF	GA	GD	Pts	Qualification or relegation
6	FC Tokyo	34	16	7	11	50	46	+4	55	
7	Urawa Red Diamonds	34	15	8	11	50	42	+8	53	
8	Gamba Osaka	34	14	8	12	46	49	−3	50	Qualification for 2009 AFC Champions League Group stage (Note: Qualified as the winner of 2008 Emperor's Cup.)
9	Yokohama F. Marinos	34	13	9	12	43	32	+11	48	
10	Vissel Kobe	34	12	11	11	39	38	+1	47	

Updated to match(es) played on December 6, 2008. Source: J. League Division 1
Rules for classification: 1) points; 2) goal difference; 3) number of goals scored.
Notes:

Match	Date	Venue	Opponents	Score
1	2008..	[[]]	[[]]	-
2	2008..	[[]]	[[]]	-
3	2008..	[[]]	[[]]	-
4	2008..	[[]]	[[]]	-
5	2008..	[[]]	[[]]	-
6	2008..	[[]]	[[]]	-
7	2008..	[[]]	[[]]	-
8	2008..	[[]]	[[]]	-
9	2008..	[[]]	[[]]	-
10	2008..	[[]]	[[]]	-
11	2008..	[[]]	[[]]	-
12	2008..	[[]]	[[]]	-
13	2008..	[[]]	[[]]	-
14	2008..	[[]]	[[]]	-
15	2008..	[[]]	[[]]	-
16	2008..	[[]]	[[]]	-
17	2008..	[[]]	[[]]	-
18	2008..	[[]]	[[]]	-
19	2008..	[[]]	[[]]	-
20	2008..	[[]]	[[]]	-
21	2008..	[[]]	[[]]	-
22	2008..	[[]]	[[]]	-
23	2008..	[[]]	[[]]	-
24	2008..	[[]]	[[]]	-
25	2008..	[[]]	[[]]	-
26	2008..	[[]]	[[]]	-
27	2008..	[[]]	[[]]	-
28	2008..	[[]]	[[]]	-
29	2008..	[[]]	[[]]	-
30	2008..	[[]]	[[]]	-
31	2008..	[[]]	[[]]	-
32	2008..	[[]]	[[]]	-
33	2008..	[[]]	[[]]	-
34	2008..	[[]]	[[]]	-

=== Emperor's Cup ===
Gamba Osaka received a bye to the fourth round as being part of the J.League Division 1.

16 November 2008 4th round	Gamba Osaka	2–1 (a.e.t.)	Ventforet Kofu	Osaka
13:04	Yamaguchi 80'; Myojin (yellow card) 89'; Sasaki 104'	Report	Maranhão 1'; Ikehata (yellow card) 89'	Stadium: Expo '70 Commemorative Stadium; Attendance: 3,694; Referee: Yoshitsugu Katayama

26 November 2008 5th round	Júbilo Iwata	1–3	Gamba Osaka	Iwata
19:04	Nishi 1'; Naruoka (yellow card) 64'	Report	Sasaki 15'; Yamaguchi 55'; Yamazaki 74' (yellow card) 83'	Stadium: Yamaha Stadium; Attendance: 2,648; Referee: Shinji Murakami

25 December 2008 Quarter-finals	Gamba Osaka	2–1	Nagoya Grampus	Kobe
19:05	Lucas 13'; Nakazawa 22'	Report	Nakamura (yellow card) 10'; Masukawa (yellow card) 33'; Yoshida (yellow card) 50'; Sugimoto 70'; Magnum (yellow card) 78'	Stadium: Kobe Universiade Memorial Stadium; Attendance: 4,955; Referee: Toshimitsu Yoshida

29 December 2008 Semi-finals	Yokohama F. Marinos	0–1 (a.e.t.)	Gamba Osaka	Tokyo
15:05	Shimizu (yellow card) 82' (yellow-red card) 102'; Tanaka (yellow card) 89'	Report	Yamazaki 116'	Stadium: National Stadium; Attendance: 19,843; Referee: Kazuhiko Matsumura

1 January 2009 Final	Gamba Osaka	1–0 (a.e.t.)	Kashiwa Reysol	Tokyo
14:02	Nakazawa (yellow card) 43'; Kaji (yellow card) 63'; Bando 116'	Report	Koga (yellow card) 43'; Ota (yellow card) 44'; Otani (yellow card) 95'	Stadium: National Stadium; Attendance: 44,066; Referee: Yuichi Nishimura

=== J. League Cup ===
Gamba Osaka received a bye to the quarter-finals in order to avoid scheduling conflicts due to their participation in the AFC Champions League.

Quarter-finals

2 July 2008 1st leg	Gamba Osaka	1–0	Yokohama F. Marinos	Kanazawa
18:59	Yamaguchi (yellow card) 48'; Hirai 78'	Report	Rôni (yellow card) 57'	Stadium: Ishikawa Athletics Stadium; Attendance: 10,702; Referee: Hiroyoshi Takayama

6 August 2008 2nd leg	Yokohama F. Marinos	2–1 (2–2a agg.)	Gamba Osaka	Yokohama
19:00	Komiyama 32'; Lopes Tigrão 84'	Report	Shimohira (yellow card) 30'; Futagawa 34'	Stadium: NHK Spring Mitsuzawa Football Stadium; Attendance: 8.365; Referee: Akio Okutani

Semi-finals

3 September 2008 1st leg	Shimizu S-Pulse	1–1	Gamba Osaka	Shizuoka
19:00	Edamura 54'; Iwashita (yellow card) 89'	Report	Futagawa 10'; Terada (yellow card) 43'; Nakazawa (yellow card) 44'; Kaji (yellow card) 81'; Yamaguchi (yellow card) 89'	Stadium: Nihondaira Sports Stadium; Attendance: 8,013; Referee: Kenji Ogiya

7 September 2008 2nd leg	Gamba Osaka	2–3 (3–4 agg.)	Shimizu S-Pulse	Osaka
19:00	Rôni 11' (yellow card) 70'; Nakazawa (yellow card) 56'; Lucas (yellow card) 77' (goal) 79'	Report	Yamamoto 3'; Edamura 46', 55' (yellow card) 89'	Stadium: Expo '70 Commemorative Stadium; Attendance: 9,103; Referee: Yuichi Nishimura

== International results ==
=== AFC Champions League ===
Gamba Osaka qualified for this tournament after finishing in 3rd place in the 2007 J.League Division 1.

==== Group stage ====
Pos	Team	Pld	W	D	L	GF	GA	GD	Pts	Qualification
1	(Japan) Gamba Osaka	6	4	2	0	14	8	+6	14	Advance to knockout stage
2	(Australia) Melbourne Victory	6	2	1	3	10	11	−1	7	
3	(South Korea) Chunnam Dragons	6	1	3	2	8	10	−2	6	
4	(Thailand) Chonburi	6	1	2	3	7	10	−3	5	

12 March 2008 1	Gamba Osaka (Japan)	1–1	(Thailand) Chonburi	Osaka, Japan
19:00 UTC+9	Severino 90+4'	Report	Sunthornphit 59'; Phuk-hom (yellow card) 76'	Stadium: Expo '70 Commemorative Stadium; Attendance: 7,000; Referee: Hedayat Mombeni (Iran)

19 March 2008 2	Chunnam Dragons (South Korea)	3–4	(Japan) Gamba Osaka	Gwangyang, South Korea
18:30 UTC+9	Victor 5'; Kim Tae-su 29', 61'; Lim Kwan-sik (yellow card) 70'; Kim Ung-jin (yellow card) 85'	Report	Futagawa 31'; Bando 55', 76'; Yasuda 59' (yellow card) 88'; Endō (yellow card) 73'	Stadium: Gwangyang Football Stadium; Attendance: 3,000; Referee: Tayeb Shamsuzzaman (Bangladesh)

9 April 2008 3	Melbourne Victory (Australia)	3–4	(Japan) Gamba Osaka	Melbourne, Australia
19:30 UTC+10	Allsopp 4', 66'; Vargas 41'	Report	Futagawa 32'; Baré 39'; Yamaguchi 69'; Lucas 89'	Stadium: Telstra Dome; Attendance: 23,857; Referee: Subkhiddin Mohd Salleh (Malaysia)

23 April 2008 4	Gamba Osaka (Japan)	2–0	(Australia) Melbourne Victory	Osaka, Japan
19:00 UTC+9	Yamazaki 31', 57'; Yamaguchi (yellow card) 88'	Report	Broxham (yellow card) 56'	Stadium: Expo '70 Commemorative Stadium; Attendance: 8,132; Referee: Ali Al-Badwawi (United Arab Emirates)

7 May 2008 5	Chonburi (Thailand)	0–2	(Japan) Gamba Osaka	Bangkok, Thailand
19:30 UTC+7	Inthasen (yellow card) 8'; Phuk-hom (yellow card) 38'; Samana (yellow card) 51'; Phanrit (yellow card) 58'	Report	Lucas (yellow card) 9' (goal) 76'; Hashimoto (yellow card) 12'; Nakazawa (yellow card) 23'; Yamazaki 64'	Stadium: Suphachalasai Stadium; Attendance: 10,000; Referee: Abdulrahman Abdou (Qatar)

21 May 2008 6	Gamba Osaka (Japan)	1–1	(South Korea) Chunnam Dragons	Osaka, Japan
19:00 UTC+9	Futagawa 75'	Report	Yoo Hong-youl 85' (pen.)	Stadium: Expo '70 Commemorative Stadium; Attendance: 7,160; Referee: Sun Baojie (China)

==== Knockout stage ====
Quarter-finals

17 September 2008 1st leg	Al-Karamah (Syria)	1–2	(Japan) Gamba Osaka	Homs, Syria
22:00 UTC+2	Abduldaim 7' (yellow card) 88'; Fahed Nazeer Oudah (yellow card) 34'	Report	Yamaguchi 70'; Yamazaki 77'	Stadium: Khalid ibn al-Walid Stadium; Attendance: 17,000; Referee: Matthew Breeze (Australia)

24 September 2008 2nd leg	Gamba Osaka (Japan)	2–0 (4–1 agg.)	(Syria) Al-Karamah	Osaka, Japan
19:00 UTC+9	Yamaguchi (yellow card) 67'; Yamazaki 83'; Rôni 85'	Report	Al Shbli (yellow card) 28'; Abbas (yellow card) 40'; Al Taiar (yellow card) 68'	Stadium: Expo '70 Commemorative Stadium; Attendance: 9,656; Referee: Sun Baojie (China)

Semi-finals

8 October 2008 1st leg	Gamba Osaka (Japan)	1–1	(Japan) Urawa Red Diamonds	Osaka, Japan
19:00 UTC+9	Endō 81' (pen.); Mineiro (yellow card) 83'; Shimohira (yellow card) 86'	Report	Hosogai 22' (yellow card) 57'; Soma (yellow card) 44'; Tsuzuki (yellow card) 90+3'	Stadium: Expo '70 Commemorative Stadium; Attendance: 17,166; Referee: Abdullah Al Hilali (Oman)

22 October 2008 2nd leg	Urawa Red Diamonds (Japan)	1–3 (2–4 agg.)	(Japan) Gamba Osaka	Saitama, Japan
19:30 UTC+9	Túlio (yellow card) 22'; Takahara 36'; Yamada (yellow card) 70'	Report	Yamaguchi 51'; Sasaki (yellow card) 62'; Myojin 72'; Endō 76'; Kaji (yellow card) 85'; Bando (yellow card) 90+1'	Stadium: Saitama Stadium 2002; Attendance: 53,287; Referee: Muhsen Basma (Syria)

Finals

5 November 2008 1st leg	Gamba Osaka (Japan)	3–0	(Australia) Adelaide United	Osaka, Japan
19:00 UTC+9	Lucas 37'; Endō 43'; Yasuda 68'	Report	Sarkies (yellow card) 35'; Costanzo (yellow card) 41'; Galekovic (yellow card) 90'	Stadium: Expo '70 Commemorative Stadium; Attendance: 21,000; Referee: Abdul Malik Abdul Bashir (Singapore)

12 November 2008 2ng leg	Adelaide United (Australia)	0–2 (0–5 agg.)	(Japan) Gamba Osaka	Adelaide, Australia
19:30 UTC+10:30	Cristiano (yellow card) 38'; Valkanis (yellow card) 42'	Report	Lucas 4', 14'; Endō (yellow card) 67'; Shimohira (yellow card) 83'	Stadium: Hindmarsh Stadium; Attendance: 17,000; Referee: Subkhiddin Mohd Salleh (Malaysia)

=== FIFA Club World Cup ===
Gamba Osaka qualified for this tournament after winning the AFC Champions League.

14 December 2008 Quarter-finals	Adelaide United (Australia)	0–1	(Japan) Gamba Osaka	Toyota, Japan
19:30	Ognenovski (yellow card) 21'; Cássio (yellow card) 33'; Reid (yellow card) 43'	Report	Endō 23'; Yasuda (yellow card) 36'; Kaji (yellow card) 41'	Stadium: Toyota Stadium; Attendance: 38,141; Referee: Pablo Pozo (Chile)

18 December 2008 Semi-finals	Gamba Osaka (Japan)	3–5	(England) Manchester United	Yokohama, Japan
19:30	Yamazaki 74'; Endō 85' (pen.); Hashimoto 90+1'; Yamaguchi (yellow card) 90+3'	Report	Vidić 28'; Ronaldo 45+1'; Rooney 75', 79' (yellow card) 82'; Fletcher 78'	Stadium: International Stadium; Attendance: 67,618; Referee: Benito Archundia (Mexico)

21 December 2008 Third place match	Pachuca (Mexico)	0–1	(Japan) Gamba Osaka	Yokohama, Japan
16:30	Rodríguez (yellow card) 6'; Calero (yellow card) 15'; López (yellow card) 79'	Report	Yamazaki 29' (yellow card) 82'; Fujigaya (yellow card) 90+2'; Futagawa (red card) 90+3'	Stadium: International Stadium; Attendance: 62,619; Referee: Pablo Pozo (Chile)

=== Pan-Pacific Championship ===
Gamba Osaka qualified for this tournament as winners of the 2007 J.League Cup.

20 February 2008 Semifinals	Gamba Osaka (Japan)	1–0	(United States) Los Angeles Galaxy	Honolulu, United States
18:00 UTC−10	Baré 3'; Mineiro (yellow card) 5'	Report		Stadium: Aloha Stadium; Attendance: 15,128; Referee: Baldomero Toledo (United States)

23 February 2008 Final	Gamba Osaka (Japan)	6–1	(United States) Houston Dynamo	Honolulu, United States
20:30 UTC−10	Baré 14', 26', 60', 72' (yellow card) 59'; Lucas 64'; Yamazaki 78'	Report	Clark 11'; Davis (yellow card) 13'; Holden (yellow card) 47'	Stadium: Aloha Stadium; Attendance: 23,087; Referee: Kevin Stott (United States)

=== Suruga Bank Championship ===
Gamba Osaka qualified for this tournament as winners of the 2007 J.League Cup.

30 July 2008 Final	Gamba Osaka (Japan)	0–1	(Argentina) Arsenal de Sarandí	Osaka, Japan
19:00	Nakazawa (yellow card) 87'; Kurata (yellow card) 87'	Report	Sava (yellow card) 19'; Casteglione 87'; Pellerano (yellow card) 89'; Díaz (red card) 90+5'	Stadium: Nagai Stadium; Attendance: 19,278; Referee: Liang Zhao (China)

== Player statistics ==
No.	Pos.	Player	D.o.B. (Age)	Height / Weight	J. League 1		Emperor's Cup		J. League Cup		Total	
No.	Pos.	Player	D.o.B. (Age)	Height / Weight	Apps	Goals	Apps	Goals	Apps	Goals	Apps	Goals
1	GK	Naoki Matsuyo	April 9, 1974 (aged 33)	cm / kg	9	0						
2	DF	Sota Nakazawa	October 26, 1982 (aged 25)	cm / kg	30	3						
3	DF	Mineiro	December 5, 1981 (aged 26)	cm / kg	2	0						
4	DF	Hiroki Mizumoto	September 12, 1985 (aged 22)	cm / kg	7	0						
5	DF	Satoshi Yamaguchi	April 17, 1978 (aged 29)	cm / kg	34	5						
6	DF	Yohei Fukumoto	April 12, 1987 (aged 20)	cm / kg	5	0						
7	MF	Yasuhito Endō	January 28, 1980 (aged 28)	cm / kg	27	6						
8	MF	Shinichi Terada	June 10, 1985 (aged 22)	cm / kg	13	2						
9	FW	Lucas Severino	January 3, 1979 (aged 29)	cm / kg	31	8						
10	MF	Takahiro Futagawa	June 27, 1980 (aged 27)	cm / kg	29	1						
11	FW	Ryūji Bando	August 2, 1979 (aged 28)	cm / kg	15	1						
13	DF	Michihiro Yasuda	December 20, 1987 (aged 20)	cm / kg	26	0						
14	FW	Shoki Hirai	December 4, 1987 (aged 20)	cm / kg	8	0						
16	MF	Hayato Sasaki	November 29, 1982 (aged 25)	cm / kg	19	1						
17	MF	Tomokazu Myojin	January 24, 1978 (aged 30)	cm / kg	32	3						
18	FW	Baré	January 18, 1982 (aged 26)	cm / kg	18	10						
18	FW	Rôni	April 28, 1977 (aged 30)	cm / kg	9	2						
19	DF	Takumi Shimohira	October 6, 1988 (aged 19)	cm / kg	15	0						
20	MF	Shu Kurata	November 26, 1988 (aged 19)	cm / kg	13	0						
21	DF	Akira Kaji	January 13, 1980 (aged 28)	cm / kg	26	0						
22	GK	Yosuke Fujigaya	February 13, 1981 (aged 27)	cm / kg	28	0						
23	MF	Takuya Takei	January 25, 1986 (aged 22)	cm / kg	3	0						
24	FW	Kenta Hoshihara	May 1, 1988 (aged 19)	cm / kg	0	0						
25	FW	Hideya Okamoto	May 18, 1987 (aged 20)	cm / kg	3	0						
26	GK	Masaki Kinoshita	June 22, 1989 (aged 18)	cm / kg	0	0						
27	MF	Hideo Hashimoto	May 21, 1979 (aged 28)	cm / kg	34	0						
28	DF	Ryujiro Ueda	January 29, 1988 (aged 20)	cm / kg	0	0						
29	GK	Atsushi Kimura	May 1, 1984 (aged 23)	cm / kg	0	0						
30	FW	Masato Yamazaki	December 4, 1981 (aged 26)	cm / kg	30	4						
31	MF	Kodai Yasuda	August 8, 1989 (aged 18)	cm / kg	0	0						

== Other pages ==
- (in Japanese) J. League official site
