= 2008 AFC Champions League final =

- Event: 2008 AFC Champions League
Gamba Osaka	Adelaide United
(Japan)	(Australia)
5	0

First leg
Gamba Osaka	Adelaide United
3	0
- Date: 5 November 2008
- Venue: Osaka Expo '70 Stadium, Suita, Osaka
- Referee: Malik Abdul Bashir
- Attendance: 20,639
- Weather: Clear; 17 °C (63 °F)

Second leg
Adelaide United	Gamba Osaka
0	2
- Date: 12 November 2008
- Venue: Hindmarsh Stadium, Adelaide
- Referee: Subkhiddin Mohd Salleh
- Attendance: 17,000
- Weather: Clear; 28 °C (82 °F)

The 2008 AFC Champions League final was a two-legged football tie to determine the 2008 champions of Asian club football. Gamba Osaka defeated Adelaide United 5-0 on aggregate to take the title. The first leg took place on 5 November 2008 at 19:00 local time (UTC+9) at Osaka Expo '70 Stadium in Osaka, Japan and the second leg took place on 12 November 2008 at 19:30 local time (UTC+10:30) at Hindmarsh Stadium, Adelaide, Australia.

It was the first final to feature a club from Australia and the second consecutive season with a Japanese finalist, in 2014 a second Australian club, the Western Sydney Wanderers made the final and won it. The winners, Gamba Osaka, received US$600,000 prize money and qualified to represent Asia in the 2008 FIFA Club World Cup, where they were defeated in the semi-finals by Premier League and UEFA Champions League winners Manchester United. Despite losing this final, Adelaide United also qualified for the FIFA Club World Cup by replacing the conventional host country berth, which was provisionally reserved for the J. League champions, and were defeated once again by host team Gamba Osaka in the quarter-finals.

== Format ==
The rules for the final were exactly the same as for the previous knockout rounds. The tie was contested over two legs with away goals deciding the winner if the two teams were level on goals after the second leg. If the teams could still not be separated at that stage then extra time would have been played with a penalty shootout taking place if the teams were still level after that.

== Route to the final ==
Note: In all results below, the score of the finalist is given first (H: home; A: away).

(Japan) Gamba Osaka				Round	(Australia) Adelaide United			
Opponent	Result			Group stage	Opponent	Result		
(Thailand) Chonburi	1–1 (H)			Matchday 1	(South Korea) Pohang Steelers	2–0 (A)		
(South Korea) Chunnam Dragons	4–3 (A)			Matchday 2	(China) Changchun Yatai	0–0 (H)		
(Australia) Melbourne Victory	4–3 (A)			Matchday 3	(Vietnam) Bình Dương	2–1 (A)		
(Australia) Melbourne Victory	2–0 (H)			Matchday 4	(Vietnam) Bình Dương	4–1 (H)		
(Thailand) Chonburi	2–0 (A)			Matchday 5	(South Korea) Pohang Steelers	1–0 (H)		
(South Korea) Chunnam Dragons	1–1 (H)			Matchday 6	(China) Changchun Yatai	0–0 (A)		
Group G winner: Pos / Team / Pld / Pts; 1 / (Japan) Gamba Osaka / 6 / 14; 2 / (Australia) Melbourne Victory / 6 / 7; 3 / (South Korea) Chunnam Dragons / 6 / 6; 4 / (Thailand) Chonburi / 6 / 5				Final standings	Group E winner: Pos / Team / Pld / Pts; 1 / (Australia) Adelaide United / 6 / 14; 2 / (China) Changchun Yatai / 6 / 12; 3 / (South Korea) Pohang Steelers / 6 / 5; 4 / (Vietnam) Bình Dương / 6 / 1			
Opponent	Agg.	1st leg	2nd leg	Knock-out stage	Opponent	Agg.	1st leg	2nd leg
(Syria) Al-Karamah	4–1	2–1 (A)	2–0 (H)	Quarter-finals	(Japan) Kashima Antlers	2–1	1–1 (A)	1–0 (H)
(Japan) Urawa Red Diamonds	4–2	1–1 (H)	3–1 (A)	Semi-finals	(Uzbekistan) Bunyodkor	2–1	3–0 (H)	0–1 (A)

== Pre-final buildup ==
Adelaide United considered applying for permission to play their home leg in a stadium larger than Hindmarsh such as Adelaide Oval or AAMI Stadium but the club eventually decided that it would not be right to play such a big match away from their traditional home despite its smaller capacity.

== Final summary ==
Team 1	Agg.	Team 2	1st leg	2nd leg
Gamba Osaka (Japan)	5–0	(Australia) Adelaide United	3–0	2–0

=== First leg ===
5 November 2008
19:00 (UTC+9)

Gamba Osaka (Japan)	3 – 0	(Australia) Adelaide United
Lucas 37'; Endo 43'; Yasuda 68'	Report

Osaka Expo '70 Stadium, Osaka
Attendance: 20,639
Referee: Malik Abdul Bashir (Singapore)

Gamba Osaka	Adelaide United

GAMBA OSAKA:
GK	22	(Japan) Yosuke Fujigaya
DF	2	(Japan) Sota Nakazawa
DF	5	(Japan) Satoshi Yamaguchi (c)
DF	21	(Japan) Akira Kaji
MF	7	(Japan) Yasuhito Endo
MF	10	(Japan) Takahiro Futagawa
MF	13	(Japan) Michihiro Yasuda	(substituted off) 75'
MF	16	(Japan) Hayato Sasaki	(substituted off) 69'
MF	17	(Japan) Tomokazu Myojin	(substituted off) 64'
MF	27	(Japan) Hideo Hashimoto
FW	9	(Brazil) Lucas
Substitutes:
GK	1	(Japan) Naoki Matsuyo
DF	3	(Brazil) Mineiro
DF	6	(Japan) Yohei Fukumoto
DF	19	(Japan) Takumi Shimohira	(substituted on) 75'
FW	11	(Japan) Ryuji Bando
FW	18	(Brazil) Roni	(substituted on) 69'
FW	30	(Japan) Masato Yamazaki	(substituted on) 64'
Manager:
(Japan) Akira Nishino

ADELAIDE UNITED:
GK	30	(Australia) Eugene Galekovic	(yellow card) 90'
DF	4	(Australia) Angelo Costanzo	(yellow card) 41'
DF	6	(Brazil) Cássio		(substituted off) 84'
DF	14	(Australia) Scott Jamieson
DF	18	(Australia) Robert Cornthwaite
DF	19	(Australia) Sasa Ognenovski
MF	7	(Australia) Lucas Pantelis		(substituted off) 73'
MF	8	(Australia) Kristian Sarkies	(yellow card) 35'
MF	13	(Australia) Travis Dodd (c)
MF	22	(Brazil) Diego Walsh
FW	10	(Brazil) Cristiano
Substitutes:
GK	20	(Australia) Mark Birighitti
DF	5	(Australia) Michael Valkanis
MF	21	(Australia) Jason Spagnuolo		(substituted on) 73'
MF	24	(Australia) Paul Reid
MF	26	(Australia) Fabian Barbiero
FW	25	(Australia) Robert Younis		(substituted on) 84'
Manager:
(Australia) Aurelio Vidmar

=== Second leg ===
12 November 2008
19:30 (UTC+10:30)

Adelaide United (Australia)	0 – 2	(Japan) Gamba Osaka
	Report	Lucas 4', 15'

Hindmarsh Stadium, Adelaide
Attendance: 17,000
Referee: Subkhiddin Mohd Salleh (Malaysia)

Adelaide United	Gamba Osaka

ADELAIDE UNITED:
GK	20	(Australia) Mark Birighitti
DF	5	(Australia) Michael Valkanis	(yellow card) 41'
DF	6	(Brazil) Cássio
DF	14	(Australia) Scott Jamieson
DF	18	(Australia) Robert Cornthwaite
DF	19	(Australia) Sasa Ognenovski
MF	8	(Australia) Kristian Sarkies		(substituted off) 58'
MF	13	(Australia) Travis Dodd (c)
MF	22	(Brazil) Diego Walsh		(substituted off) 69'
MF	24	(Australia) Paul Reid
FW	10	(Brazil) Cristiano	(yellow card) 37'	(substituted off) 69'
Substitutes:
MF	7	(Australia) Lucas Pantelis		(substituted on) 69'
MF	21	(Australia) Jason Spagnuolo		(substituted on) 58'
MF	26	(Australia) Fabian Barbiero
MF	27	(Australia) Matthew Mullen
FW	25	(Australia) Robert Younis		(substituted on) 69'
Manager:
(Australia) Aurelio Vidmar

GAMBA OSAKA:
GK	22	(Japan) Yosuke Fujigaya
DF	2	(Japan) Sota Nakazawa
DF	5	(Japan) Satoshi Yamaguchi (c)
DF	21	(Japan) Akira Kaji
MF	7	(Japan) Yasuhito Endo	(yellow card) 68'
MF	10	(Japan) Takahiro Futagawa
MF	13	(Japan) Michihiro Yasuda		(substituted off) 64'
MF	16	(Japan) Hayato Sasaki		(substituted off) 58'
MF	17	(Japan) Tomokazu Myojin		(substituted off) 81'
MF	27	(Japan) Hideo Hashimoto
FW	9	(Brazil) Lucas
Substitutes:
GK	1	(Japan) Naoki Matsuyo
DF	3	(Brazil) Mineiro
DF	6	(Japan) Yohei Fukumoto
DF	19	(Japan) Takumi Shimohira	(yellow card) 83'	(substituted on) 64'
FW	11	(Japan) Ryuji Bando		(substituted on) 81'
FW	18	(Brazil) Roni
FW	30	(Japan) Masato Yamazaki		(substituted on) 58'
Manager:
(Japan) Akira Nishino

== See also ==
- 2008 AFC Champions League
- 2008 FIFA Club World Cup
