= 2008 in Iraqi football =

The 2008 season was the 60th season of competitive football in Iraq, since the creation of the Iraq Football Association in 1948.

== National team ==
=== Ambassadors of Peace match ===
December 22, 2008
19:30 GMT

Iraq	1 – 2	Ambassadors of Peace
Hawar Mulla Mohammed 40'		Stefano Eranio 13', 27'

San Siro, Milan (Italy)

=== Group 1 ===
Pos	Team	Pld	W	D	L	GF	GA	GD	Pts	Qualification	(Australia)	(Qatar)	(Iraq)	(China)
1	Australia	6	3	1	2	7	3	+4	10	Fourth round	—	3–0	1–0	0–1
2	Qatar	6	3	1	2	5	6	−1	10	Fourth round	1–3	—	2–0	0–0
3	Iraq	6	2	1	3	4	6	−2	7		1–0	0–1	—	1–1
4	China	6	1	3	2	3	4	−1	6		0–0	0–1	1–2	—

2008-02-06
16:30 UTC+4

Iraq	1 – 1	China
Hawar Mulla 51' (pen.)	Report	Zheng Zhi 75'

Al-Rashid Stadium, Dubai (United Arab Emirates)^{1}
Attendance: 11,000
Referee: Torky (Iran)

2008-03-26
18:30 UTC+3

Qatar	2 – 0	Iraq
Montezine 1' 62'	Report

Jassim Bin Hamad Stadium, Doha
Attendance: 13,000
Referee: Nishimura (Japan)

2008-06-01
17:00 UTC+10

Australia	1 – 0	Iraq
Kewell 47'	Report

Suncorp Stadium, Brisbane
Attendance: 48,678
Referee: Irmatov (Uzbekistan)

2008-06-07
20:00 UTC+4

Iraq	1 – 0	Australia
Emad Mohammed 28'	Report

Al-Rashid Stadium, Dubai (United Arab Emirates)^{1}
Attendance: 8,000
Referee: Matsumura (Japan)

2008-06-14
20:00 UTC+8

China	1 – 2	Iraq
Zhou Haibin 33'	Report	Emad Mohammed 41'; Nashat Akram 65'

Tianjin Olympic Centre Stadium, Tianjin
Attendance: 39,000
Referee: Bashir (Singapore)

2008-06-22
20:00 UTC+4

Iraq	0 – 1	Qatar
	Report	Bechir 77'

Al-Rashid Stadium, Dubai (United Arab Emirates)^{1}
Attendance: 10,000
Referee: Al-Badwawi (UAE)

== U-21 National Team ==
=== Norway - Middle East U21 National Team Tournament ===
Team	Pld	W	D	L	GF	GA	GD	Pts
Iraq	3	2	1	0	3	1	+2	7
Jordan	3	1	2	0	2	0	+2	5
Norway	3	1	1	1	4	2	+2	4
Syria	3	0	0	3	0	6	−6	0

2008-11-22

Iraq	0 – 0	Jordan

King Abdullah Stadium, Amman

2008-11-25

Iraq	2 – 1	Norway
Ali Salah Hashim 48'; Mustafa Karim 72'	Report	Cato Hansen 2'

King Abdullah Stadium, Amman
Attendance: 500
Referee: Ali Eid (Jordan)

2008-11-28

Iraq	1 – 0	Syria
Halgurd Mulla Mohammed 62'

Prince Mohammed Stadium, Zarqa

== Youth team ==
=== Youth team friendlies ===
August 18, 2008

Iraq	0 – 0	Jordan

Amman, Jordan
August 20, 2008

Iraq	0 – 0	Jordan

Amman, Jordan
August 27, 2008

Iraq	2 – 1	Lebanon
Faris Hassan 72'; Mohammed Abdul-Zahra 83'		Ali Bazzi 81'

Safa Stadium, Beirut, Lebanon
August 29, 2008

Iraq	2 – 2	Lebanon
Qais Tariq 31'; Ayoub Ayad 90'		Alaa Termoss 8'; Ali Bazzi 25'

Bhamdoun Stadium, Bhamdoun, Lebanon
September 1, 2008

Iraq	3 – 0	Lebanon
Ayoub Ayad 8'; Qais Tariq 23'; Jaber Shakir 42'

Bhamdoun Stadium, Bhamdoun, Lebanon
October 15, 2008

Iraq	1 – 1	Jordan
Ayoub Ayad 86'		Amer Abu Hwaiti 45'

Prince Mohammed Stadium, Zarqa, Jordan

=== Inter Cup 2008 ===
Team	Pld	W	D	L	GF	GA	GD	Pts
Nigeria U-23	3	2	1	0	5	2	+3	7
Republic of Ireland U-21	3	1	1	1	4	4	0	4
Malaysia U-23	3	1	1	1	3	4	−1	4
Iraq U-19	3	0	1	2	0	2	−2	1

May 17, 2008

Iraq	0 – 1	Malaysia
		Mohd Safee Mohd Sali 30'

MBPJ Stadium, Petaling Jaya, Kuala Lumpur

May 19, 2008

Iraq	0 – 0	Republic of Ireland

KLFA Stadium, Cheras, Kuala Lumpur

May 21, 2008

Iraq	0 – 1	Nigeria
		John Owoeri 90+2' (pen.)

MBPJ Stadium, Petaling Jaya, Kuala Lumpur

=== AFC Youth Championship ===
Team	Pld	W	D	L	GF	GA	GD	Pts
United Arab Emirates	3	3	0	0	6	2	+4	9
South Korea	3	2	0	1	4	2	+2	6
Iraq	3	1	0	2	3	5	−2	3
Syria	3	0	0	3	1	5	−4	0

2008-10-31
18:45

Iraq	1 – 2	United Arab Emirates
Ali Oudah 84'	(Report)	Ismaeel 65'; Fawzi 75'

Prince Saud bin Jalawi Stadium, Khobar
Attendance: 300
Referee: (Qatar) Abdulrahman Hussain

2008-11-02
16:15

Syria	1 – 2	Iraq
Al-Suma 88'	(Report)	Ali Oudah 49' 65'

Prince Saud bin Jalawi Stadium, Khobar
Attendance: 300
Referee: (China) Tan Hai

2008-11-04
18:45

South Korea	2 – 0	Iraq
Kim Bo-Kyung 23'; Moon Ki-Han 87'	(Report)

Prince Mohamed bin Fahd Stadium, Dammam
Attendance: 400
Referee: (Uzbekistan) Valentin Kovalenko

== U-16 Team ==
=== U-16 Team Friendlies ===
September 19, 2008

Iraq	2 – 1	United Arab Emirates
Ali Jassim 88'; Marwan Hussein 87'		Hadaf Abdullah 75'

Jeque Zayed Stadium, Abu Dhabi
September 21, 2008

Iraq	3 – 2	United Arab Emirates

Jeque Zayed Stadium, Abu Dhabi

=== Niigata U-16 Tournament ===
Team	Pld	W	D	L	GF	GA	GD	Pts
Japan	3	3	0	0	19	2	+17	9
(Japan) Albirex Niigata	3	2	0	1	8	10	−2	6
Iraq	3	1	0	2	6	8	−2	3
Costa Rica	3	0	0	3	3	16	−13	0

July 19, 2008

Iraq	0 – 5	Japan

July 20, 2008

Iraq	4 – 0	Costa Rica

July 21, 2008

Iraq	2 – 3	(Japan) Albirex Niigata

== Domestic clubs in international tournaments ==
=== Group B ===
Pos	Team	Pld	W	D	L	GF	GA	GD	Pts	Qualification
1	(Iran) Saipa	6	3	3	0	7	3	+4	12	Advance to knockout stage
2	(Iraq) Al-Quwa Al-Jawiya	6	2	2	2	5	5	0	8	
3	(United Arab Emirates) Al Wasl	6	2	1	3	5	7	−2	7	
4	Al Kuwait	6	1	2	3	4	6	−2	5	

March 12, 2008

Al Wasl FC	0 – 1	Al-Quwa Al-Jawiya
	Report	Ali Alwan 32'

Zabeel Stadium, Dubai, UAE
Attendance: 7,500
Referee: (Saudi Arabia) Khalil Ibrahim Al Ghamdi

March 19, 2008

Al-Quwa Al-Jawiya	0 – 0	Al Kuwait Kaifan
	Report

Al Kuwait Sports Club Stadium, Kuwait City, Kuwait
Attendance: 4,000
Referee: (Syria) Muhsen Basma

April 9, 2008

Al-Quwa Al-Jawiya	0 – 1	Saipa F.C.
	Report	Amir Vaziri 45+1'

Al Kuwait Sports Club Stadium, Kuwait City, Kuwait
Attendance: 1,000
Referee: (Jordan) Salem Mahmoud Mujghef

April 23, 2008

Saipa F.C.	1 – 1	Al-Quwa Al-Jawiya
Kianoush Rahmati 63' (pen)	Report	Ahmad Ayad 71'

Enghelab Stadium, Karaj, Iran
Referee: (Uzbekistan) Ravshan Irmatov

May 7, 2008

Al-Quwa Al-Jawiya	1 – 2	Al Wasl FC
Ibrahim Kamel 69'	Report	Mohammed Salem Al-Enazi 49'; Alexander Oliveira 64'

Al Kuwait Sports Club Stadium, Kuwait City, Kuwait
Attendance: 100
Referee: (China) Hai Tan

May 21, 2008

Al Kuwait Kaifan	1 – 2	Al-Quwa Al-Jawiya
Khaled Ajab 22'	Report	Haitham Kadhim 17'; Yassir Abdul-Mohsen 48'

Al Kuwait Sports Club Stadium, Kuwait City, Kuwait
Attendance: 250
Referee: (Japan) Masaaki Iemoto

=== Group D ===
Pos	Team	Pld	W	D	L	GF	GA	GD	Pts	Qualification
1	(Kuwait) Al Qadisiya	6	3	2	1	8	7	+1	11	Advance to knockout stage
2	(Uzbekistan) Pakhtakor	6	3	2	1	13	6	+7	11	
3	(Iraq) Erbil	6	2	2	2	8	11	−3	8	
4	(Qatar) Al-Gharafa	6	0	2	4	3	8	−5	2	

March 12, 2008

Arbil FC	1 – 1	Al-Gharafa
Muslim Mubarak 61'	Report	Araújo 13'

Prince Mohammed Stadium, Zarqa, Jordan
Attendance: 250
Referee: (Lebanon) Talaat Najm

March 19, 2008

Al Qadisiya Kuwait	1 – 1	Arbil FC
Khalaf Al Salama 81'		Ahmad Salah Alwan 28' (pen)

Mohammed Al-Hamad Stadium
Referee: (Saudi Arabia) Khalil Ibrahim Al Ghamdi

April 9, 2008

FC Pakhatakor	2 – 0	Arbil FC
Akmal Kholmatov 47'; Alexander Geynrikh 52' (pen)	Report

MHSK Stadium, Tashkent, Uzbekistan
Attendance: 10,000
Referee: (Iran) Masoud Moradi

April 23, 2008

Arbil FC	1 – 5	FC Pakhatakor
Haidar Sabah 19'	Report	Salah Al-Deen Siamand 38' (og); Nodirbek Kuziboyev 69'; Darko Marković 73'; Alexander Geynrikh 81'; Akmal Kholmatov 90+3'

Prince Mohammed Stadium, Zarqa, Jordan
Attendance: 180
Referee: (United Arab Emirates) Mohamed Al Marzouqi

May 7, 2008

Al-Gharafa	0 – 1	Arbil FC
	Report	Ahmad Salah Alwan 29'

Al-Gharafa Stadium
Attendance: 200
Referee: (Syria) Muhsen Basma

May 21, 2008

Arbil FC	4 – 2	Al Qadisiya Kuwait
Luay Salah 52' 70' 79'; Ahmad Salah Alwan 89'	Report	Saadoun Al Shammari 23'; Ali Al-Kandri 34'

Prince Mohammed Stadium, Zarqa, Jordan
Attendance: 120
Referee: (Iran) Hedayat Mombini

== Arab Champions League ==
Iraq has 1 spot. The spot was given to the 3rd Placed team of the Iraqi Premier League 2007-08.

=== Round 32 ===
October 28, 2008

Al-Quwa Al-Jawiya (Iraq)	2 – 1	(Morocco) Hassania Agadir
Akram Hashim 63'; Ahmad Ayad 67'		Yassine Rami 90'

Prince Mohammed Stadium, Zarqa
November 26, 2008

Hassania Agadir (Morocco)	0 – 0	(Iraq) Al-Quwa Al-Jawiya

Stade Al Inbiaâte, Agadir

=== Round 16 ===
December 16, 2008

Al-Quwa Al-Jawiya (Iraq)	1 – 1	(Tunisia) Union Sportive Monastir
Hussein Jawad 66'		Aymen Ayari 6'

Prince Mohammed Stadium, Zarqa
November 28, 2008

Union Sportive Monastir (Tunisia)	2 – 0	(Iraq) Al-Quwa Al-Jawiya
Hecham Al-Saifi 80', 82'

Stade Mustapha Ben Jannet, Monastir
