= 2008 AFC Champions League knockout stage =

The 2008 AFC Champions League knockout stage was played from 17 September to 12 November 2008. A total of eight teams competed in the knockout stage to decide the champions of the 2008 AFC Champions League.

== Qualified teams ==
The knockout stage involved seven teams which qualified as winners in the group stage, plus defending champions Urawa Red Diamonds.

Zone	Group	Winners
West Asia	A	(Uzbekistan) Bunyodkor
West Asia	B	(Iran) Saipa
West Asia	C	(Syria) Al-Karamah
West Asia	D	(Kuwait) Al Qadsia
East Asia	E	(Australia) Adelaide United
East Asia	F	(Japan) Kashima Antlers
East Asia	G	(Japan) Gamba Osaka
East Asia	—	(Japan) Urawa Red Diamonds^{TH}

== Bracket ==
Quarter-finals
(Syria) Al-Karamah	1	0	1
(Japan) Gamba Osaka	2	2	4
(Kuwait) Al Qadisiya	3	0	3
(Japan) Urawa Red Diamonds	2	2	4
(Japan) Kashima Antlers	1	0	1
(Australia) Adelaide United	1	1	2
(Iran) Saipa	2	1	3
(Uzbekistan) Bunyodkor	2	5	7

Semi-finals
(Japan) Gamba Osaka	1	3	4
(Japan) Urawa Red Diamonds	1	1	2
(Australia) Adelaide United	3	0	3
(Uzbekistan) Bunyodkor	0	1	1

Final
(Japan) Gamba Osaka	3	2	5
(Australia) Adelaide United	0	0	0

== Quarter-finals ==
The first leg matches were played on 17 September, and the second leg matches were played on 24 September 2008.

Team 1	Agg.	Team 2	1st leg	2nd leg
Al-Karamah (Syria)	1–4	(Japan) Gamba Osaka	1–2	0–2
Al Qadisiya (Kuwait)	3–4	(Japan) Urawa Red Diamonds	3–2	0–2
Saipa (Iran)	3–7	(Uzbekistan) Bunyodkor	2–2	1–5
Kashima Antlers (Japan)	1–2	(Australia) Adelaide United	1–1	0–1

=== Matches ===
17 September 2008
19:00 UTC+9

Kashima Antlers (Japan)	1–1	(Australia) Adelaide United
Cornthwaite 45+2' (o.g.)	Report	Dodd 37'

Kashima Soccer Stadium, Kashima
Attendance: 7,004
Referee: Lee Gi-Young (South Korea)
24 September 2008
19:30 UTC+10:30

Adelaide United (Australia)	1–0	(Japan) Kashima Antlers
Cornthwaite 72'	Report

Hindmarsh Stadium, Adelaide
Attendance: 16,965
Referee: Saad Kameel Al Fadhli (Kuwait)

Adelaide United won 2–1 on aggregate.

17 September 2008
21:15 UTC+3:30

Saipa (Iran)	2–2	(Uzbekistan) Bunyodkor
Razzaghi-Rad 19'; Rahmati 40'	Report	Villanueva 12'; Rivaldo 20'

Azadi Stadium, Tehran
Attendance: 40,000
Referee: Saad Kameel Al Fadhli (Kuwait)
24 September 2008
16:00 UTC+5

Bunyodkor (Uzbekistan)	5–1	(Iran) Saipa
Villanueva 9', 19' (pen.), 52'; Rivaldo 45' (pen.); Luizão 68'	Report	Mirghorbani 47'

MHSK Stadium, Tashkent
Attendance: 15,000
Referee: Muhsen Basma (Syria)

Bunyodkor won 7–3 on aggregate.

17 September 2008
22:00 UTC+2

Al-Karamah (Syria)	1–2	(Japan) Gamba Osaka
Abduldaim 7'	Report	Yamaguchi 70'; Yamazaki 77'

Khaled bin Walid Stadium, Homs
Attendance: 17,000
Referee: Matthew Breeze (Australia)
24 September 2008
19:00 UTC+9

Gamba Osaka (Japan)	2–0	(Syria) Al-Karamah
Yamazaki 83'; Roni 85'	Report

Osaka Expo '70 Stadium, Osaka
Attendance: 9,656
Referee: Sun Baojie (China)

Gamba Osaka won 4–1 on aggregate.

17 September 2008
22:00 UTC+3

Al Qadisiya (Kuwait)	3–2	(Japan) Urawa Red Diamonds
Al Ebrahim 18'; Ben Achour 57'; Al-Mutairi 84' (pen.)	Report	Edmilson 33', 90'

Mohammed Al-Hamad Stadium, Kuwait City
Attendance: 12,000
Referee: Masoud Moradi (Iran)
24 September 2008
19:30 UTC+9

Urawa Red Diamonds (Japan)	2–0	(Kuwait) Al Qadisiya
Soma 31'; Tulio 54'	Report

Saitama Stadium, Saitama
Attendance: 41,790
Referee: Benjamin Williams (Australia)

Urawa Red Diamonds won 4–3 on aggregate.

== Semi-finals ==
The first leg matches were played on 8 October, and the second leg matches were played on 22 October 2008.

Team 1	Agg.	Team 2	1st leg	2nd leg
Gamba Osaka (Japan)	4–2	(Japan) Urawa Red Diamonds	1–1	3–1
Adelaide United (Australia)	3–1	(Uzbekistan) Bunyodkor	3–0	0–1

=== Matches ===
8 October 2008
19:00 UTC+9

Gamba Osaka (Japan)	1–1	(Japan) Urawa Red Diamonds
Endō 81' (pen)	Report	Hosogai 22'

Osaka Expo '70 Stadium, Osaka
Attendance: 17,166
Referee: Abdullah Al Hilali (Oman)
22 October 2008
19:30 UTC+9

Urawa Red Diamonds (Japan)	1–3	(Japan) Gamba Osaka
Takahara 36'	Report	Yamaguchi 51'; Myojin 72'; Endō 77'

Saitama Stadium, Saitama
Attendance: 53,287
Referee: Muhsen Basma (Syria)

Gamba Osaka won 4–2 on aggregate.

8 October 2008
19:30 UTC+10:30

Adelaide United (Australia)	3–0	(Uzbekistan) Bunyodkor
Diego 57'; Barbiero 76'; Cristiano 89' (pen)	Report

Hindmarsh Stadium, Adelaide
Attendance: 16,998
Referee: Sun Baojie (China)
22 October 2008
17:30 UTC+5

Bunyodkor (Uzbekistan)	1–0	(Australia) Adelaide United
Soliev 78'	Report

MHSK Stadium, Tashkent
Attendance: 17,000
Referee: Ali Hamad Al-Badwawi (United Arab Emirates)

Adelaide United won 3–1 on aggregate.

== Final ==
The first and second legs of the final were scheduled to be played on 5 November and 12 November 2008, respectively.

Team 1	Agg.	Team 2	1st leg	2nd leg
Gamba Osaka (Japan)	5–0	(Australia) Adelaide United	3–0	2–0

=== Matches ===
5 November 2008
19:00 UTC+9

Gamba Osaka (Japan)	3–0	(Australia) Adelaide United
Lucas 37'; Endo 43'; Yasuda 68'	Report

Osaka Expo '70 Stadium, Osaka
Attendance: 20,639
Referee: Malik Abdul Bashir (Singapore)
12 November 2008
19.30 UTC+10:30

Adelaide United (Australia)	0–2	(Japan) Gamba Osaka
		Lucas 4', 15'

Hindmarsh Stadium, Adelaide
Attendance: 17,000
Referee: Subkhiddin Mohd Salleh (Malaysia)

Gamba Osaka won 5–0 on aggregate.
