= 2008 Emperor's Cup final =

2008 Emperor's Cup Final
Gamba Osaka	Kashiwa Reysol
1	0
- Date: January 1, 2009
- Venue: National Stadium, Tokyo

2008 Emperor's Cup Final was the 88th final of the Emperor's Cup competition. The final was played at National Stadium in Tokyo on January 1, 2009. Gamba Osaka won the championship.

== Match details ==
January 1, 2009

Gamba Osaka	1–0	Kashiwa Reysol
Ryūji Bando 116'	Report

National Stadium

Gamba Osaka
GK	22	(Japan) Yosuke Fujigaya
DF	21	(Japan) Akira Kaji
DF	2	(Japan) Sota Nakazawa
DF	5	(Japan) Satoshi Yamaguchi
DF	13	(Japan) Michihiro Yasuda
MF	27	(Japan) Hideo Hashimoto	(substituted off) 113'
MF	17	(Japan) Tomokazu Myojin
MF	7	(Japan) Yasuhito Endō	(substituted off) 119'
MF	8	(Japan) Shinichi Terada
FW	9	(Brazil) Lucas
FW	30	(Japan) Masato Yamazaki	(substituted off) 106'
Substitutes:
GK	1	(Japan) Naoki Matsuyo
DF	19	(Japan) Takumi Shimohira
MF	20	(Japan) Shu Kurata	(substituted on) 113'
MF	23	(Japan) Takuya Takei	(substituted on) 119'
FW	11	(Japan) Ryūji Bando	(substituted on) 106'
FW	14	(Japan) Shoki Hirai
FW	18	(Brazil) Roni
Manager:
(Japan) Akira Nishino

Kashiwa Reysol
GK	33	(Japan) Takanori Sugeno
DF	25	(Japan) Yusuke Murakami
DF	5	(Japan) Masahiro Koga
DF	13	(Japan) Yuzo Kobayashi
DF	7	(Japan) Hidekazu Otani
MF	14	(Japan) Keisuke Ota	(substituted off) 46'
MF	28	(Japan) Ryoichi Kurisawa
MF	18	(Japan) Iwao Yamane	(substituted off) 66'
MF	6	(Brazil) Alex
FW	15	(Japan) Minoru Suganuma
FW	11	(Brazil) Popo	(substituted off) 58'
Substitutes:
GK	21	(Japan) Yuta Minami
DF	2	(Japan) Jiro Kamata
DF	4	(Japan) Naoki Ishikawa	(substituted off) 66'
MF	23	(Japan) Yohei Kurakawa
MF	20	(Japan) Tadanari Lee	(substituted off) 58'
FW	10	(Brazil) Franca	(substituted off) 46'
FW	9	(Japan) Hideaki Kitajima
Manager:
(Japan) Nobuhiro Ishizaki

== See also ==
- 2008 Emperor's Cup
