= 2008 AFC Champions League =

27th edition of premier club football tournament organized by the AFC

Tournament details
- Dates: 12 March - 12 November 2008
- Teams: 29

Final positions
- Champions: (Japan) Gamba Osaka (1st title)
- Runners-up: (Australia) Adelaide United

Tournament statistics
- Matches played: 98
- Goals scored: 275 (2.81 per match)
- Top scorer(s): Nantawat Thansopa (9 goals)
- Best player: Yasuhito Endō

The 2008 AFC Champions League was the 27th AFC Champions League, the top-level Asian club football tournament, and the 6th under the current AFC Champions League title. It was the last AFC Champions League before the competition expanded to 32 teams.

Gamba Osaka defeated Adelaide United 5–0 on aggregate in the final to win their first AFC Champions League title. Both clubs qualified for the 2008 FIFA Club World Cup: Gamba Osaka as the AFC representative, and Adelaide United as the host nation's representative, since Japan's spot was reallocated due to Gamba Osaka's qualification as continental champion.

Urawa Red Diamonds were the defending champions, but were eliminated by the eventual winners Gamba Osaka in the semi-finals.

== Format ==
=== Group stage ===
A total of 28 clubs were divided into seven groups of four, based on region i.e. East Asian and Southeast Asian clubs were drawn in groups E to G, while the rest were grouped in groups A to D. Each club played double round-robin (home and away) against the other three group members, a total of six matches each. Clubs received three points for a win, one for a draw, and zero for a loss. The clubs were ranked according to points and tie breakers were in the following order:

1. Points in head-to-head matches among the tied teams;
2. Goal difference in head-to-head matches among the tied teams;
3. Goals scored in head-to-head matches among the tied teams;
4. Goal difference in all group matches;
5. Goals scored in all group matches;

The seven group winners along with the defending champion (Urawa Red Diamonds) advanced to the quarter-finals.

Knockout stage

An open draw was held for the knockout stage; teams from the same group or the same association could not be drawn against each other. Each tie was played on a home-and-away two-legged basis. The away goals rule, extra time and penalty shoot-outs were used to decide the winner if necessary.

== Schedule ==
Stage	Round	Draw date	First leg	Second leg
Group stage	Matchday 1	12 December 2007	12 March 2008	
Group stage	Matchday 2	12 December 2007	19 March 2008	
Group stage	Matchday 3	12 December 2007	9 April 2008	
Group stage	Matchday 4	12 December 2007	23 April 2008	
Group stage	Matchday 5	12 December 2007	8 May 2008	
Group stage	Matchday 6	12 December 2007	21 May 2008	
Knockout stage	Quarter-finals	24 May 2008	17 September 2008	24 September 2008
Knockout stage	Semi-finals	24 May 2008	8 October 2008	22 October 2008
Knockout stage	Final	24 May 2008	5 November 2008	12 November 2008

== Teams ==
Indonesia were initially allocated two entries. However, on 12 December 2007, the AFC redistributed Indonesia's entries to Thailand and Vietnam as the Indonesian domestic league and cup tournament wouldn't be completed in time for the start of the tournament.

West Asia		East Asia	
Quarter-finals
Team	Qualifying method	Team	Qualifying method
		(Japan) Urawa Red Diamonds	2007 AFC Champions League champions
Group Stage
Team	Qualifying method	Team	Qualifying method
(Iran) Saipa	2006–07 Persian Gulf Cup champions	(Australia) Melbourne Victory	2006–07 A-League premiers
(Iran) Sepahan	2006–07 Hazfi Cup winners	(Australia) Adelaide United	2006–07 A-League regular season runners-up
(Iraq) Erbil	2006–07 Iraqi Premier League champions	(China) Changchun Yatai	2007 Chinese Super League champions
(Iraq) Al-Quwa Al-Jawiya	2006–07 Iraqi Premier League runners-up	(China) Beijing Guoan	2007 Chinese Super League runners-up
Kuwait SC	2006–07 Kuwaiti Premier League champions	(Japan) Kashima Antlers	2007 J.League Division 1 champions
(Kuwait) Al Qadisiya	2007 Kuwait Emir Cup winners	(Japan) Gamba Osaka	2007 J.League Division 1 third-place
(Qatar) Al Sadd	2006–07 Qatar Stars League champions	(South Korea) Pohang Steelers	2007 K League champions
(Qatar) Al-Gharafa	2006–07 Qatar Stars League runners-up	(South Korea) Chunnam Dragons	2007 Korean FA Cup winners
(Saudi Arabia) Al-Ittihad	2006–07 Saudi Premier League champions	(Thailand) Chonburi	2007 Thailand Premier League champions
(Saudi Arabia) Al Ahli	2006–07 Saudi Crown Prince Cup winners	(Thailand) Krung Thai Bank	2007 Thailand Premier League runners-up
(Syria) Al-Karamah	2006–07 Syrian Premier League champions	(Vietnam) Bình Dương	2007 V-League champions
(Syria) Al-Ittihad	2006–07 Syrian Premier League runners-up	(Vietnam) Nam Định	2007 Vietnamese Cup winners
(United Arab Emirates) Al Wasl	2006–07 UAE Football League champions		
(United Arab Emirates) Al Wahda	2006–07 UAE Football League runners-up		
(Uzbekistan) Pakhtakor	2007 Uzbek League champions		
(Uzbekistan) Bunyodkor	2007 Uzbek League runners-up		

Notes

1. Australia (AUS): As 2007 A-League Grand Final winners Melbourne Victory qualified for the Champions League via their league position, the spot reserved for the A-League Grand Final winners was passed onto the runners-up of the 2006–07 A-League.
2. China (CHN): As the 2007 Chinese FA Cup was cancelled, the spot reserved for the Chinese FA Cup winners was passed onto the runners-up of the 2007 Chinese Super League.
3. Japan (JPN): As 2007 Emperor's Cup winners, Kashima Antlers qualified for the Champions League via their league position, and runners-up of the 2007 J.League Division 1, Urawa Red Diamonds, qualified for the Champions League as 2007 AFC Champions League winners. The spot reserved for the Emperor’s Cup winners was passed onto the third placed team in the league.
4. Qatar (QAT): As 2006–07 Emir of Qatar Cup winners Al Sadd qualified for the Champions League via their league position, the spot reserved for the Emir of Qatar Cup winners was passed onto the runners-up of the 2006–07 Qatar Stars League.
5. Syria (SYR): As 2006–07 Syrian Cup winners Al-Karamah qualified for the Champions League via their league position, the spot reserved for the Syrian Cup winners was passed onto the runners-up of the 2006–07 Syrian Premier League.
6. United Arab Emirates (UAE): As 2006–07 UAE President's Cup winners Al Wasl qualified for the Champions League via their league position, the spot reserved for the UAE President's Cup winners was passed onto the runners-up of the 2006–07 UAE Football League.
7. Uzbekistan (UZB): As 2007 Uzbekistan Cup winners Pakhtakor qualified for the Champions League via their league position, the spot reserved for the Uzbekistan Cup winners was passed onto the runners-up of the 2007 Uzbek League.
Location of teams of the 2008 AFC Champions League.
Brown: Group A; Red: Group B; Orange: Group C; Yellow: Group D; Pink: Group E;
Green: Group F; Blue: Group G; Cyan: Quarter-finals;

== Group stage ==
=== Group A ===
Pos	Team	Pld	W	D	L	GF	GA	GD	Pts	Qualification
1	(Uzbekistan) Bunyodkor	6	4	1	1	8	2	+6	13	Advance to knockout stage
2	(Saudi Arabia) Al-Ittihad	6	3	0	3	6	5	+1	9	
3	(Iran) Sepahan	6	2	1	3	5	8	−3	7	
4	(Syria) Al-Ittihad	6	2	0	4	4	8	−4	6	

12 March 2008

Sepahan (Iran)	0–2	(Syria) Al-Ittihad
	Report	Jésus Gomez 21'; Al Agha 87'

Foolad Shahr Stadium, Isfahan
Attendance: 15,000
Referee: Ben Williams (Australia)
12 March 2008

Al-Ittihad (Saudi Arabia)	1–0	(Uzbekistan) Bunyodkor
Magno Alves 80'	Report

Prince Abdullah al-Faisal Stadium, Jeddah
Attendance: 7,500
Referee: Yuichi Nishimura (Japan)

19 March 2008

Al-Ittihad (Syria)	0–1	(Saudi Arabia) Al-Ittihad
	Report	Magno Alves 78'

Aleppo International Stadium, Aleppo
Attendance: 41,000
Referee: Abdullah Balideh (Qatar)
19 March 2008

Bunyodkor (Uzbekistan)	2–0	(Iran) Sepahan
Bakayev 61'; Kapadze 80'	Report

MHSK Stadium, Tashkent
Attendance: 13,000
Referee: Fareed Al Marzouqi (United Arab Emirates)

9 April 2008

Al-Ittihad (Syria)	0–2	(Uzbekistan) Bunyodkor
	Report	Hasanov 50'; Kapadze 65'

Aleppo International Stadium, Aleppo
Attendance: 20,000
Referee: Kim Dong-Jin (South Korea)
9 April 2008

Sepahan (Iran)	2–1	(Saudi Arabia) Al-Ittihad
Seyed Salehi 59'; Aghily 71'	Report	Al-Meshal 89'

Azadi Stadium, Tehran
Attendance: 6,000
Referee: Sun Baojie (China)

23 April 2008

Bunyodkor (Uzbekistan)	1–0	(Syria) Al-Ittihad
Kapadze 29'	Report

MHSK Stadium, Tashkent
Attendance: 12,000
Referee: Malik Abdul Bashir (Singapore)
23 April 2008

Al-Ittihad (Saudi Arabia)	0–1	(Iran) Sepahan
	Report	Mohammed 70'

Prince Abdullah al-Faisal Stadium, Jeddah
Attendance: 4,000
Referee: Saad Kameel Al Fadhli (Kuwait)

7 May 2008

Al-Ittihad (Syria)	2–1	(Iran) Sepahan
Laurens 61'; Jésus Gomez 64'	Report	Aghily 48'

Aleppo International Stadium, Aleppo
Attendance: 4,000
Referee: Naser Al Ghafary (Jordan)
7 May 2008

Bunyodkor (Uzbekistan)	2–0	(Saudi Arabia) Al-Ittihad
Soliev 10'; Djeparov 38'	Report

MHSK Stadium, Tashkent
Attendance: 13,000
Referee: Subkhiddin Mohd Salleh (Malaysia)

21 May 2008

Sepahan (Iran)	1–1	(Uzbekistan) Bunyodkor
Ali Mohammadi 2'	Report	Gochguliev 72'

Azadi Stadium, Tehran
Attendance: 150
Referee: Abdullah Al Hilali (Oman)
21 May 2008

Al-Ittihad (Saudi Arabia)	3–0	(Syria) Al-Ittihad
Al-Nemri 30', 50'; Hazazi 42'	Report

Prince Abdullah al-Faisal Stadium, Jeddah
Attendance: 600
Referee: Tayeb Hasan Shamsuzzaman (Bangladesh)

=== Group B ===
Pos	Team	Pld	W	D	L	GF	GA	GD	Pts	Qualification
1	(Iran) Saipa	6	3	3	0	7	3	+4	12	Advance to knockout stage
2	(Iraq) Al-Quwa Al-Jawiya	6	2	2	2	5	5	0	8	
3	(United Arab Emirates) Al Wasl	6	2	1	3	5	7	−2	7	
4	Al Kuwait	6	1	2	3	4	6	−2	5	

12 March 2008

Al Wasl (United Arab Emirates)	0–1	(Iraq) Al-Quwa Al-Jawiya
	Report	Alwan 32'

Zabeel Stadium, Dubai
Attendance: 7,500
Referee: Khalil Ibrahim Al Ghamdi (Saudi Arabia)
12 March 2008

Al Kuwait	1–1	(Iran) Saipa
Ajab 44'	Report	Zaynadpour 66'

Al Kuwait Sports Club Stadium, Kuwait City
Attendance: 7,000
Referee: Abdulrahman Abdou (Qatar)

19 March 2008

Al-Quwa Al-Jawiya (Iraq)	0–0	Al Kuwait
	Report

Al Kuwait Sports Club Stadium, Kuwait City
Attendance: 4,000
Referee: Muhsen Basma (Syria)
19 March 2008

Saipa (Iran)	2–0	(United Arab Emirates) Al Wasl
Traoré 45'; Ansarifard 57'	Report

Enghelab Stadium, Karaj
Attendance: 8,000
Referee: Masaaki Iemoto (Japan)

9 April 2008

Al-Quwa Al-Jawiya (Iraq)	0–1	(Iran) Saipa
	Report	Vaziri 45+1'

Al Kuwait Sports Club Stadium, Kuwait City
Attendance: 1,000
Referee: Salem Mahmoud Mujghef (Jordan)
9 April 2008

Al Wasl (United Arab Emirates)	1–0	Al Kuwait
Hassan 75'	Report

Zabeel Stadium, Dubai
Attendance: 4,622
Referee: Yuichi Nishimura (Japan)

23 April 2008

Saipa (Iran)	1–1	(Iraq) Al-Quwa Al-Jawiya
Rahmati 63' (pen.)	Report	Ayad 71'

Enghelab Stadium, Karaj
Attendance: 10,000
Referee: Ravshan Irmatov (Uzbekistan)
23 April 2008

Al Kuwait	2–1	(United Arab Emirates) Al Wasl
Ajab 10'; Al Awadhi 42'	Report	Ali 4' (pen.)

Al Kuwait Sports Club Stadium, Kuwait City
Attendance: 1,500
Referee: Mahmood Al Ghatrifi (Oman)

7 May 2008

Al-Quwa Al-Jawiya (Iraq)	1–2	(United Arab Emirates) Al Wasl
Kamil 69'	Report	Al-Enazi 49'; Oliveira 64'

Al Kuwait Sports Club Stadium, Kuwait City
Attendance: 100
Referee: Tan Hai (China)
7 May 2008

Saipa (Iran)	1–0	Al Kuwait
Rahmati 24'	Report

Enghelab Stadium, Karaj
Attendance: 10,000
Referee: Sun Baojie (China)

21 May 2008

Al Wasl (United Arab Emirates)	1–1	(Iran) Saipa
André Dias 90+2'	Report	Traoré 21'

Zabeel Stadium, Dubai
Attendance: 1,500
Referee: Mark Shield (Australia)
21 May 2008

Al Kuwait	1–2	(Iraq) Al-Quwa Al-Jawiya
Ajab 22'	Report	Kadhim 17'; Abdul-Mohsen 48'

Al Kuwait Sports Club Stadium, Kuwait City
Attendance: 250
Referee: Masaaki Iemoto (Japan)

=== Group C ===
Pos	Team	Pld	W	D	L	GF	GA	GD	Pts	Qualification
1	(Syria) Al-Karamah	6	3	2	1	8	3	+5	11	Advance to knockout stage
2	(United Arab Emirates) Al-Wahda	6	2	3	1	6	7	−1	9	
3	(Qatar) Al-Sadd	6	1	3	2	6	8	−2	6	
4	(Saudi Arabia) Al-Ahli	6	0	4	2	5	7	−2	4	

12 March 2008

Al-Sadd (Qatar)	2–1	(Saudi Arabia) Al-Ahli
Emerson 6'; Felipe 26'	Report	Val Baiano 73'

Al Sadd Stadium, Doha
Attendance: 6,000
Referee: Ravshan Irmatov (Uzbekistan)
12 March 2008

Al-Karamah (Syria)	4–1	(United Arab Emirates) Al-Wahda
Esmaeel 3'; Chaabo 27', 48'; Al Hamwi 80'	Report	Al Shehhi 83'

Khaled bin Walid Stadium, Homs
Attendance: 30,000
Referee: Abdullah Al Hilali (Oman)

19 March 2008

Al-Ahli (Saudi Arabia)	1–1	(Syria) Al-Karamah
Al Thagafi 15'	Report	Al Hamwi 44'

Prince Abdullah al-Faisal Stadium, Jeddah
Attendance: 15,000
Referee: Sun Baojie (China)
19 March 2008

Al-Wahda (United Arab Emirates)	2–2	(Qatar) Al-Sadd
Pinga 17'; Al Shehhi 85'	Report	Tenorio 44'; Emerson 71'

Al-Nahyan Stadium, Abu Dhabi
Attendance: 5,500
Referee: Ben Williams (Australia)

9 April 2008

Al-Ahli (Saudi Arabia)	0–0	(United Arab Emirates) Al-Wahda
	Report

Prince Abdullah al-Faisal Stadium, Jeddah
Attendance: 8,000
Referee: Saad Kameel Al-Fadhli (Kuwait)
9 April 2008

Al-Sadd (Qatar)	0–2	(Syria) Al-Karamah
	Report	Al Hamwi 69'; Jenyat 73'

Al Sadd Stadium, Doha
Attendance: 6,000
Referee: Malik Abdul Bashir (Singapore)

23 April 2008

Al-Wahda (United Arab Emirates)	2–1	(Saudi Arabia) Al-Ahli
Josiel 35', 84'	Report	Al Gizani 81'

Al-Nahyan Stadium, Abu Dhabi
Attendance: 5,000
Referee: Mark Shield (Australia)
23 April 2008

Al-Karamah (Syria)	1–0	(Qatar) Al-Sadd
Jenyat 78'	Report

Khaled bin Walid Stadium, Homs
Attendance: 25,000
Referee: Matthew Breeze (Australia)

7 May 2008

Al-Ahli (Saudi Arabia)	2–2	(Qatar) Al-Sadd
Taher Zakaria 28' (o.g.); Sulimani 42' (pen.)	Report	Gholam 32' (pen.); Ahmed 50'

Prince Abdullah al-Faisal Stadium, Jeddah
Attendance: 1,500
Referee: Yuichi Nishimura (Japan)
7 May 2008

Al-Wahda (United Arab Emirates)	1–0	(Syria) Al-Karamah
Al Shehhi 90'	Report

Al-Nahyan Stadium, Abu Dhabi
Attendance: 6,000
Referee: Kazuhiko Matsumura (Japan)

21 May 2008

Al-Sadd (Qatar)	0–0	(United Arab Emirates) Al-Wahda
	Report

Al Sadd Stadium, Doha
Attendance: 800
Referee: Lee Gi-Young (South Korea)
21 May 2008

Al-Karamah (Syria)	0–0	(Saudi Arabia) Al-Ahli
	Report

Khaled bin Walid Stadium, Homs
Attendance: 15,000
Referee: Ravshan Irmatov (Uzbekistan)

=== Group D ===
Pos	Team	Pld	W	D	L	GF	GA	GD	Pts	Qualification
1	(Kuwait) Al Qadisiya	6	3	2	1	8	7	+1	11	Advance to knockout stage
2	(Uzbekistan) Pakhtakor	6	3	2	1	13	6	+7	11	
3	(Iraq) Erbil	6	2	2	2	8	11	−3	8	
4	(Qatar) Al-Gharafa	6	0	2	4	3	8	−5	2	

12 March 2008

Pakhtakor (Uzbekistan)	0–1	(Kuwait) Al Qadisiya
	Report	Ajab 90+1'

MHSK Stadium, Tashkent
Attendance: 12,000
Referee: Subkhiddin Mohd Salleh (Malaysia)
12 March 2008

Erbil (Iraq)	1–1	(Qatar) Al-Gharafa
Muslim Mubarak 61'	Report	Araújo 13'

Prince Mohammed Stadium, Zarqa
Attendance: 250
Referee: Talaat Najm (Lebanon)

19 March 2008

Al Qadisiya (Kuwait)	1–1	(Iraq) Erbil
Al Salama 81'		Alwan 28' (pen.)

Mohammed Al-Hamad Stadium, Kuwait City
Referee: Khalil Ibrahim Al Ghamdi (Saudi Arabia)
19 March 2008

Al-Gharafa (Qatar)	2–2	(Uzbekistan) Pakhtakor
Mahmoud 57'; Araújo 65'	Report	Aliqulov 68'; F. Tadjiyev 78'

Al-Gharafa Stadium, Doha
Attendance: 2,000
Referee: Lee Gi-Young (South Korea)

9 April 2008

Al Qadisiya (Kuwait)	1–0	(Qatar) Al-Gharafa
Ajab 62'	Report

Mohammed Al-Hamad Stadium, Kuwait City
Attendance: 5,000
Referee: Mahmood Al Ghatrifi (Oman)
9 April 2008

Pakhtakor (Uzbekistan)	2–0	(Iraq) Erbil
Kholmatov 47'; Geynrikh 52' (pen.)	Report

MHSK Stadium, Tashkent
Attendance: 10,000
Referee: Masoud Moradi (Iran)

23 April 2008

Al-Gharafa (Qatar)	0–1	(Kuwait) Al Qadisiya
	Report	Al-Mutwa 89'

Al-Gharafa Stadium, Doha
Attendance: 1,000
Referee: Hiroyoshi Takayama (Japan)
23 April 2008

Erbil (Iraq)	1–5	(Uzbekistan) Pakhtakor
Sabah 19'	Report	Siamand 38' (o.g.); Kuziboyev 69'; Marković 73'; Geynrikh 81'; Kholmatov 90+3'

Prince Mohammed Stadium, Zarqa
Attendance: 180
Referee: Mohamed Al Marzouqi (United Arab Emirates)

7 May 2008

Al Qadisiya (Kuwait)	2–2	(Uzbekistan) Pakhtakor
Ajab 20'; Al Salama 45' (pen.)	Report	Ahmedov 36'; Z. Tadjiyev 81'

Mohammed Al-Hamad Stadium, Kuwait City
Attendance: 18000
Referee: Salem Mahmoud Mujghef (Jordan)
7 May 2008

Al-Gharafa (Qatar)	0–1	(Iraq) Erbil
	Report	Alwan 29'

Al-Gharafa Stadium, Doha
Attendance: 200
Referee: Muhsen Basma (Syria)

21 May 2008

Pakhtakor (Uzbekistan)	2–0	(Qatar) Al-Gharafa
Z. Tadjiyev 19'; Ahmedov 88' (pen.)	Report

MHSK Stadium, Tashkent
Attendance: 3,000
Referee: Satop Tongkhan (Thailand)
21 May 2008

Erbil (Iraq)	4–2	(Kuwait) Al Qadisiya
Salah 52', 70', 79'; Alwan 89'	Report	Al Shammari 23'; Al-Kandri 34'

Prince Mohammed Stadium, Zarqa
Attendance: 120
Referee: Hedayat Mombini (Iran)

=== Group E ===
Pos	Team	Pld	W	D	L	GF	GA	GD	Pts	Qualification
1	(Australia) Adelaide United	6	4	2	0	9	2	+7	14	Advance to knockout stage
2	(China) Changchun Yatai	6	3	3	0	10	3	+7	12	
3	(South Korea) Pohang Steelers	6	1	2	3	6	7	−1	5	
4	(Vietnam) Bình Dương	6	0	1	5	4	17	−13	1	

12 March 2008

Changchun Yatai (China)	2–1	(Vietnam) Bình Dương
Du Zhenyu 4'; Cui Wei 70'	Report	Nguyễn Anh Đức 53'

Changchun City Stadium, Changchun
Attendance: 10,000
Referee: Ali Al-Badwawi (United Arab Emirates)
12 March 2008

Pohang Steelers (South Korea)	0–2	(Australia) Adelaide United
	Report	Cornthwaite 3'; Djite 59'

Steelyard Stadium, Pohang
Attendance: 8,436
Referee: Mohsen Torky (Iran)

19 March 2008

Bình Dương (Vietnam)	1–4	(South Korea) Pohang Steelers
Robson 11' (pen.)	Report	Denilson 49' (pen.), 58' (pen.); Kim Jae-sung 56'; Choi Hyo-jin 64'

Gò Đậu Stadium, Thủ Dầu Một
Attendance: 12,000
Referee: Salem Mahmoud Mujghef (Jordan)
19 March 2008

Adelaide United (Australia)	0–0	(China) Changchun Yatai
	Report

Hindmarsh Stadium, Adelaide
Attendance: 10,510
Referee: Hiroyoshi Takayama (Japan)

9 April 2008

Bình Dương (Vietnam)	1–2	(Australia) Adelaide United
Philani 85'	Report	Diego 10'; Alagich 78'

Gò Đậu Stadium, Thủ Dầu Một
Attendance: 15,000
Referee: Atallah Jatli Al Enezi (Kuwait)
9 April 2008

Changchun Yatai (China)	1–0	(South Korea) Pohang Steelers
Dah Zadi 86'	Report

Changchun City Stadium, Changchun
Attendance: 18,000
Referee: Abdulrahman Abdou (Qatar)

23 April 2008

Adelaide United (Australia)	4–1	(Vietnam) Bình Dương
Pantelis 56'; Dodd 58', 62'; Diego 77'	Report	Phạm Minh Đức 65'

Hindmarsh Stadium, Adelaide
Attendance: 13,802
Referee: Mohamed Al Hilali (Oman)
23 April 2008

Pohang Steelers (South Korea)	2–2	(China) Changchun Yatai
Hwang Jae-won 64'; Hwang Jin-sung 90'	Report	Wang Dong 35'; Du Zhenyu 70'

Steelyard Stadium, Pohang
Attendance: 5,468
Referee: Satop Tongkhan (Thailand)

7 May 2008

Bình Dương (Vietnam)	0–5	(China) Changchun Yatai
	Report	Wang Bo 2', 37'; Dah Zadi 13'; Yan Feng 78'; Caballero 90' (pen.)

Gò Đậu Stadium, Thủ Dầu Một
Attendance: 4,000
Referee: Khalil Ibrahim Al Ghamdi (Saudi Arabia)
7 May 2008

Adelaide United (Australia)	1–0	(South Korea) Pohang Steelers
Diego 63'	Report

Hindmarsh Stadium, Adelaide
Attendance: 11,805
Referee: Ravshan Irmatov (Uzbekistan)

21 May 2008

Pohang Steelers (South Korea)	0–0	(Vietnam) Bình Dương
	Report

Steelyard Stadium, Pohang
Attendance: 4,571
Referee: Abdulrahman Recho (Syria)

22 May 2008

Changchun Yatai (China)	0–0	(Australia) Adelaide United
	Report

Changchun City Stadium, Changchun
Attendance: 20,000
Referee: Subkhiddin Mohd Salleh (Malaysia)

=== Group F ===
Pos	Team	Pld	W	D	L	GF	GA	GD	Pts	Qualification
1	(Japan) Kashima Antlers	6	5	0	1	28	3	+25	15	Advance to knockout stage
2	(China) Beijing Guoan	6	4	0	2	14	9	+5	12	
3	(Thailand) Krung Thai Bank	6	2	1	3	20	27	−7	7	
4	(Vietnam) Nam Định	6	0	1	5	4	27	−23	1	

12 March 2008

Krung Thai Bank (Thailand)	1–9	(Japan) Kashima Antlers
Kone 64'	Report	Tashiro 15', 50'; Iwamasa 21'; Nozawa 34', 90+2'; Marquinhos 47', 69', 71'; Sasaki 73'

Chulalongkorn University Sports Stadium, Bangkok
Attendance: 2,000
Referee: Muhsen Basma (Syria)
12 March 2008

Nam Định (Vietnam)	1–3	(China) Beijing Guoan
Lê Văn Duyệt 14'	Report	Yan Xiangchuang 57', 90+1'; Du Wenhui 60'

Mỹ Đình National Stadium, Hanoi (Note: Nam Định played their home matches at Mỹ Đình National Stadium, Hanoi, as their regular home stadium Thiên Trường Stadium , Nam Định did not meet AFC requirements.)
Attendance: 600
Referee: Kim Dong-Jin (South Korea)

19 March 2008

Kashima Antlers (Japan)	6–0	(Vietnam) Nam Định
Motoyama 25', 48'; Marquinhos 58', 67'; Tashiro 73'; Danilo 90+2'	Report

Kashima Soccer Stadium, Kashima
Attendance: 7,087
Referee: Mohamad Mansour (Lebanon)
19 March 2008

Beijing Guoan (China)	4–2	(Thailand) Krung Thai Bank
Du Wenhui 39', 73'; Martínez 51', 75'	Report	Thansopa 58'; Pichitchotirat 63'

Beijing Fengtai Stadium, Beijing
Attendance: 14,000
Referee: Atallah Jatli (Kuwait)

9 April 2008

Kashima Antlers (Japan)	1–0	(China) Beijing Guoan
Danilo 52'	Report

Kashima Soccer Stadium, Kashima
Attendance: 6,487
Referee: Mohsen Torky (Iran)
9 April 2008

Krung Thai Bank (Thailand)	9–1	(Vietnam) Nam Định
Kone 4', 44', 90+1', 90+2'; Thansopa 8', 46', 59'; Choeichiu 64'; Wongsuparuk 70'	Report	Trần Đức Dương 64'

Chulalongkorn University Sports Stadium, Bangkok
Attendance: 500
Referee: Hedayat Mombeni (Iran)

23 April 2008

Beijing Guoan (China)	1–0	(Japan) Kashima Antlers
Tiago 41'	Report

Beijing Fengtai Stadium, Beijing
Attendance: 16,000
Referee: Subkhiddin Mohd Salleh (Malaysia)
23 April 2008

Nam Định (Vietnam)	2–2	(Thailand) Krung Thai Bank
Hoàng Ngọc Linh 2', 47'	Report	Thansopa 21'; Choeichiu 90'

Mỹ Đình National Stadium, Hanoi
Attendance: 2,000
Referee: Mohammad Dharman (Qatar)

7 May 2008

Kashima Antlers (Japan)	8–1	(Thailand) Krung Thai Bank
Iwamasa 19'; Koroki 21'; Tashiro 45'; Nozawa 46', 66'; Ogasawara 50'; Danilo 74', 83'	Report	Pichitchotirat 90'

Kashima Soccer Stadium, Kashima
Attendance: 5,540
Referee: Matthew Breeze (Australia)
7 May 2008

Beijing Guoan (China)	3–0	(Vietnam) Nam Định
Guo Hui 14' (pen.); Yang Hao 32', 78'	Report

Beijing Fengtai Stadium, Beijing
Attendance: 9,000
Referee: Kadhum Auda (Iraq)

21 May 2008

Krung Thai Bank (Thailand)	5–3	(China) Beijing Guoan
Thansopa 10', 44', 49', 69' (pen.); Pichitchotirat 27'	Report	Tiago 67' (pen.), 70', 77' (pen.)

Rajamangala Stadium, Bangkok
Attendance: 400
Referee: Fareed Ali Mohamed Al Marzouqi (United Arab Emirates)
21 May 2008

Nam Định (Vietnam)	0–4	(Japan) Kashima Antlers
	Report	Tashiro 27'; Koroki 47'; Motoyama 75'; Danilo 87'

Mỹ Đình National Stadium, Hanoi
Attendance: 1,200
Referee: Mohamed Omar Al Saeedi (United Arab Emirates)

=== Group G ===
Pos	Team	Pld	W	D	L	GF	GA	GD	Pts	Qualification
1	(Japan) Gamba Osaka	6	4	2	0	14	8	+6	14	Advance to knockout stage
2	(Australia) Melbourne Victory	6	2	1	3	10	11	−1	7	
3	(South Korea) Chunnam Dragons	6	1	3	2	8	10	−2	6	
4	(Thailand) Chonburi	6	1	2	3	7	10	−3	5	

12 March 2008

Melbourne Victory (Australia)	2–0	(South Korea) Chunnam Dragons
Muscat 28' (pen.); Vargas 66'	Report

Telstra Dome, Melbourne
Attendance: 24,656
Referee: Malik Abdul Bashir (Singapore)
12 March 2008

Gamba Osaka (Japan)	1–1	(Thailand) Chonburi
Lucas 90+4'	Report	Sunthornpit 59'

Osaka Expo '70 Stadium, Suita
Attendance: 7,000
Referee: Hedayat Mombeni (Iran)

19 March 2008

Chunnam Dragons (South Korea)	3–4	(Japan) Gamba Osaka
Simões 4'; Kim Tae-su 27', 60' (pen.)	Report	Futagawa 30'; Bando 53', 75'; Yasuda 58'

Gwangyang Stadium, Gwangyang
Attendance: 3,000
Referee: Tayeb Hasan Shamsuzzaman (Bangladesh)
19 March 2008

Chonburi (Thailand)	3–1	(Australia) Melbourne Victory
Ney Fabiano 45'; Baga 79', 90+5'	Report	Allsopp 57'

Suphachalasai Stadium, Bangkok (Note: Chonburi played their home matches at Supachalasai Stadium, Bangkok, as their regular home stadium Chonburi Municipality Stadium, Chonburi. did not meet AFC requirements.)
Attendance: 10,000
Referee: Kadhum Auda (Iraq)

9 April 2008

Chunnam Dragons (South Korea)	1–0	(Thailand) Chonburi
Simões 90'	Report

Gwangyang Stadium, Gwangyang
Attendance: 500
Referee: Abdullah Al Hilali (Oman)
9 April 2008

Melbourne Victory (Australia)	3–4	(Japan) Gamba Osaka
Allsopp 4', 65'; Vargas 41'	Report	Futagawa 31'; Baré 38'; Yamaguchi 68'; Lucas 89'

Telstra Dome, Melbourne
Attendance: 26,857
Referee: Subkhiddin Mohd Salleh (Malaysia)

23 April 2008

Chonburi (Thailand)	2–2	(South Korea) Chunnam Dragons
On-Mo 56'; Jinta 88'	Report	Jeong Jun-yeon 5'; Kim Myung-woon 48'

Suphachalasai Stadium, Bangkok
Attendance: 10,000
Referee: Tan Hai (China)
23 April 2008

Gamba Osaka (Japan)	2–0	(Australia) Melbourne Victory
Yamazaki 31', 57'	Report

Osaka Expo '70 Stadium, Suita
Attendance: 8,132
Referee: Ali Al-Badwawi (United Arab Emirates)

7 May 2008

Chunnam Dragons (South Korea)	1–1	(Australia) Melbourne Victory
Ko Ki-gu 37'	Report	Pondeljak 4'

Gwangyang Stadium, Gwangyang
Attendance: 3,000
Referee: Abdullah Balideh (Qatar)
7 May 2008

Chonburi (Thailand)	0–2	(Japan) Gamba Osaka
	Report	Yamazaki 64'; Lucas 76'

Suphachalasai Stadium, Bangkok
Attendance: 10,000
Referee: Abdulrahman Abdou (Qatar)

21 May 2008

Melbourne Victory (Australia)	3–1	(Thailand) Chonburi
Muscat 56'; Thompson 65'; Hernández 77'	Report	Ney Fabiano 55'

Telstra Dome, Melbourne
Attendance: 14,558
Referee: Salem Mahmoud Mujghef (Jordan)
21 May 2008

Gamba Osaka (Japan)	1–1	(South Korea) Chunnam Dragons
Futagawa 75'	Report	Yoo Hong-youl 86' (pen.)

Osaka Expo '70 Stadium, Suita
Attendance: 7,160
Referee: Sun Baojie (China)

== Knock-out stage ==
=== Bracket ===
Quarter-finals
(Syria) Al-Karamah	1	0	1
(Japan) Gamba Osaka	2	2	4
(Kuwait) Al Qadisiya	3	0	3
(Japan) Urawa Red Diamonds	2	2	4
(Japan) Kashima Antlers	1	0	1
(Australia) Adelaide United	1	1	2
(Iran) Saipa	2	1	3
(Uzbekistan) Bunyodkor	2	5	7

Semi-finals
(Japan) Gamba Osaka	1	3	4
(Japan) Urawa Red Diamonds	1	1	2
(Australia) Adelaide United	3	0	3
(Uzbekistan) Bunyodkor	0	1	1

Final
(Japan) Gamba Osaka	3	2	5
(Australia) Adelaide United	0	0	0

=== Quarter-finals ===
The first leg matches were played on 17 September, and the second leg matches were played on 24 September 2008.

Team 1	Agg.	Team 2	1st leg	2nd leg
Al-Karamah (Syria)	1–4	(Japan) Gamba Osaka	1–2	0–2
Al Qadisiya (Kuwait)	3–4	(Japan) Urawa Red Diamonds	3–2	0–2
Saipa (Iran)	3–7	(Uzbekistan) Bunyodkor	2–2	1–5
Kashima Antlers (Japan)	1–2	(Australia) Adelaide United	1–1	0–1

=== Semi-finals ===
The first leg matches were played on 8 October, and the second leg matches were played on 22 October 2008.

Team 1	Agg.	Team 2	1st leg	2nd leg
Gamba Osaka (Japan)	4–2	(Japan) Urawa Red Diamonds	1–1	3–1
Adelaide United (Australia)	3–1	(Uzbekistan) Bunyodkor	3–0	0–1

=== Final ===
5 November 2008
19:00 UTC+9

Gamba Osaka (Japan)	3–0	(Australia) Adelaide United
Lucas 37'; Endo 43'; Yasuda 68'	Report

Osaka Expo '70 Stadium, Osaka
Attendance: 20,639
Referee: Malik Abdul Bashir (Singapore)
12 November 2008
19.30 UTC+10:30

Adelaide United (Australia)	0–2	(Japan) Gamba Osaka
		Lucas 4', 15'

Hindmarsh Stadium, Adelaide
Attendance: 17,000
Referee: Subkhiddin Mohd Salleh (Malaysia)

Gamba Osaka won 5–0 on aggregate.

== Top scorers ==
The top scorers from the 2008 AFC Champions League are as follows:

Rank	Player	Club	Goals
1	(Thailand) Nantawat Thansopa	(Thailand) Krung Thai Bank	9
2	(Brazil) Lucas	(Japan) Gamba Osaka	6
3	(Brazil) Marquinhos	(Japan) Kashima Antlers	5
3	(Japan) Masato Yamazaki	(Japan) Gamba Osaka	5
3	(Ivory Coast) Kone Kassim	(Thailand) Krung Thai Bank	5
3	(Japan) Yuzo Tashiro	(Japan) Kashima Antlers	5
3	(Brazil) Danilo	(Japan) Kashima Antlers	5
8	(Japan) Takuya Nozawa	(Japan) Kashima Antlers	4
8	(Brazil) Tiago	(China) Beijing Guoan	4
8	(Chile) Villanueva	(Uzbekistan) Bunyodkor	4
8	(Brazil) Diego Walsh	(Australia) Adelaide United	4

== Fair Play Award ==
(Japan) Gamba Osaka

== See also ==
- 2008 FIFA Club World Cup
