= Hayato Sasaki =

Japanese footballer

Personal information
- Full name: Hayato Sasaki
- Date of birth: November 29, 1982 (age 43)
- Place of birth: Shiogama, Miyagi, Japan
- Height: 1.67 m (5 ft 6 in)
- Position: Midfielder

Team information
- Current team: Tochigi SC
- Number: 41

Youth career
- 2001–2004: Osaka Gakuin University

Senior career*
Years	Team	Apps	(Gls)
2005–2007	Montedio Yamagata	119	(10)
2008–2012	Gamba Osaka	111	(8)
2013–2014	Vegalta Sendai	32	(0)
2015	Kyoto Sanga	20	(1)
2016–	Tochigi SC		
Medal record
Gamba Osaka
Winner	AFC Champions League	2008
Runner-up	J1 League	2010
Winner	Emperor's Cup	2008
Winner	Emperor's Cup	2009
Runner-up	Emperor's Cup	2012
- * Club domestic league appearances and goals as of 23 February 2016

Hayato Sasaki (佐々木 勇人, Sasaki Hayato; born November 29, 1982 in Shiogama, Miyagi) is a Japanese football player currently playing for Tochigi SC and currently assistant managers club WE League of MyNavi Sendai.

== Club career statistics ==
Updated to 23 February 2016.

Club performance			League		Cup		League Cup		Continental		Total	
Season	Club	League	Apps	Goals	Apps	Goals	Apps	Goals	Apps	Goals	Apps	Goals
Japan			League		Emperor's Cup		League Cup		AFC		Total	
2005	Montedio Yamagata	J2 League	41	4	1	0	-		-		42	4
2006	Montedio Yamagata	J2 League	43	4	2	0	-		-		45	4
2007	Montedio Yamagata	J2 League	35	2	2	0	-		-		37	2
2008	Gamba Osaka	J1 League	19	1	2	2	1	0	6	0	28	3
2009	Gamba Osaka	J1 League	30	3	5	1	2	0	5	2	42	6
2010	Gamba Osaka	J1 League	26	3	5	2	2	0	6	0	0	0
2011	Gamba Osaka	J1 League	21	1	1	1	2	1	6	0	0	0
2012	Gamba Osaka	J1 League	15	0	5	0	2	0	4	0	0	0
2013	Vegalta Sendai	J1 League	22	0	4	1	1	0	4	0	0	0
2014	Vegalta Sendai	J1 League	10	0	1	0	4	0	–		15	0
2015	Kyoto Sanga	J2 League	20	1	2	1	–		–		22	2
Career total			282	19	30	8	14	1	31	2	357	30

=== FIFA Club World Cup career statistics ===
Season	Team	Apps	Goals
2008	Gamba Osaka	1	0

== Team honors ==
- AFC Champions League - 2008
- Pan-Pacific Championship - 2008
- Emperor's Cup - 2008, 2009
