= Yohei Fukumoto =

Japanese footballer (born 1987)

Yohei Fukumoto 福元 洋平
Personal information
- Full name: Yohei Fukumoto
- Date of birth: 12 April 1987 (age 39)
- Place of birth: Ōita, Ōita, Japan
- Height: 1.81 m (5 ft 11 in)
- Position: Centre back

Youth career
- –1999: Akeno Nishi JFC
- 2000–2005: Oita Trinita

Senior career*
Years	Team	Apps	(Gls)
2005–2007	Oita Trinita	32	(0)
2008	Gamba Osaka	5	(0)
2009–2011	JEF United Chiba	38	(0)
2012–2016	Tokushima Vortis	134	(1)
2017–2018	Renofa Yamaguchi	23	(1)
2019	Verspah Oita	1	(0)

International career
2007	Japan U-20	4	(0)
Medal record
Gamba Osaka
Winner	AFC Champions League	2008
Winner	Emperor's Cup	2008
Representing Japan
AFC U-19 Championship
Silver medal – second place	2006 India
- * Club domestic league appearances and goals

Yohei Fukumoto (福元 洋平, Fukumoto Yōhei; born 12 April 1987 in Ōita, Ōita) is a Japanese retired footballer.

== National team career ==
In July 2007, he was elected Japan U-20 national team for 2007 U-20 World Cup. At this tournament, he played full-time in all four matches as captain.

== Club statistics ==
Updated to 23 February 2017.

Club performance			League		Cup		League Cup		Continental		Total	
Season	Club	League	Apps	Goals	Apps	Goals	Apps	Goals	Apps	Goals	Apps	Goals
Japan			League		Emperor's Cup		League Cup		AFC		Total	
2004	Oita Trinita U-18	-	-		3	0	-		-		3	0
2005	Oita Trinita	J1 League	7	0	0	0	0	0	-		7	0
2006	Oita Trinita	J1 League	14	0	0	0	5	0	-		19	0
2007	Oita Trinita	J1 League	11	0	1	0	2	0	-		14	0
2008	Gamba Osaka	J1 League	5	0	0	0	1	0	2	0	8	0
2009	JEF United Chiba	J1 League	17	0	3	0	3	0	-		23	0
2010	JEF United Chiba	J2 League	19	0	3	0	-		-		22	0
2011	JEF United Chiba	J2 League	2	0	2	0	-		-		4	0
2012	Tokushima Vortis	J2 League	23	0	2	0	-		-		25	0
2013	Tokushima Vortis	J2 League	24	0	0	0	-		-		24	0
2014	Tokushima Vortis	J1 League	26	0	0	0	3	0	-		29	0
2015	Tokushima Vortis	J2 League	28	1	3	0	-		-		31	1
2016	Tokushima Vortis	J2 League	33	0	1	0	-		-		34	0
Career total			209	1	18	0	14	0	2	0	243	1

== National team career statistics ==
=== Appearances in major competitions ===
Team	Competition	Category	Appearances		Goals	Team record
Team	Competition	Category	Start	Sub	Goals	Team record
Japan	AFC Youth Championship 2006 Qualification	U-18	2	0	0	Qualified
Japan	AFC Youth Championship 2006	U-19	5	0	0	2nd place
Japan	2007 FIFA U-20 World Cup	U-20	4	0	0	Round of 16

== Honours ==
=== Club ===
Gamba Osaka

- AFC Champions League (1) : 2008
- Emperor's Cup (1) : 2008
- Pan-Pacific Championship (1) : 2008
