= Nantawat Tansopa =

Thai footballer

Personal information
- Full name: Nantawat Tansopa
- Date of birth: 22 February 1984 (age 42)
- Place of birth: Maha Sarakham, Thailand
- Height: 1.73 m (5 ft 8 in)
- Positions: Striker; winger

Team information
- Current team: Chiangrai City
- Number: 7

Senior career*
Years	Team	Apps	(Gls)
2004–2007	Police United	55	(17)
2007–2009	Bangkok Glass	76	(23)
2010–2011	Police United	12	(5)
2012–2016	Chiangrai United	64	(4)
2017–	Chiangrai City	65	(8)
Total		272	(57)

Managerial career
- 2017–: Chiangrai City
- * Club domestic league appearances and goals as of 18 March 2023

Nantawat Tansopa (Thai: นันทวัฒน์ แทนโสภา; born February 22, 1984), simply known as ying (Thai: ยิ่ง), is a Thai professional footballer. He is currently a Player-coach at Chiangrai City.

== Club career ==
He was also the leading scorer of the 2008 AFC Champions League with 9 goals.

== Honours ==
=== Club ===
Police United

- Thai Division 1 League: 2006

=== Individual ===
- AFC Champions League Top Scorer : 2008
