= 2006 AFC Youth Championship qualification =

Tournament details
- Teams: 42 (from 1 confederation)

Following are the results of the 2006 AFC Youth Championship qualification. The Asian Football Confederations AFC Youth Championship 2006 was the 34th instance of the AFC Youth Championship. It was held from 29 October to 12 November 2006 in India. It was the first time for India to host this tournament. Sixteen teams from the AFC qualified to the finals.

== Matches ==
India qualified as hosts

=== Group 1 ===
Team	Pld	W	D	L	GF	GA	GD	Pts
Iraq	2	2	0	0	3	0	+3	6
Kuwait (H)	2	1	0	1	4	2	+2	3
Lebanon	2	0	0	2	1	6	−5	0

23 November 2005

Lebanon	0–2	Iraq
		Alaa Abdul-Zahra 34'; Khaldoun Ibrahim 45'

Al Kuwait Sports Club Stadium, Kuwait City, Kuwait

25 November 2005

Kuwait	4–1	Lebanon
Amer Al-Fadhel 16' 43'; Ali Al-Mashmoum 24' 34'		Ali Safwan 47'

Al Kuwait Sports Club Stadium, Kuwait City, Kuwait

27 November 2005

Iraq	1–0	Kuwait
Mostafa Karim 76' (pen.)

Al Kuwait Sports Club Stadium, Kuwait City, Kuwait

=== Group 2 ===
Team	Pld	W	D	L	GF	GA	GD	Pts
Saudi Arabia (H)	2	2	0	0	7	3	+4	6
Syria	2	1	0	1	3	3	0	3
Oman	2	0	0	2	2	6	−4	0

23 November 2005

Syria	1–3	Saudi Arabia
Mahmoud Khaddoj 87'		Ahmed Kabee 42'; Ibrahim Al Abdullah 73' (o.g.); Mohammed Al Sahlawi 89'

Prince Mohamed bin Fahd Stadium, Dammam, Saudi Arabia

25 November 2005

Saudi Arabia	4–2	Oman
Mohammed Al Sahlawi 63' 76'; Mohammed Al Bishi 73'; Nasir Al Selimi 83'		Jaifar Al Mukhani 33'; Mohammed Al Shamsi 77'

Prince Mohamed bin Fahd Stadium, Dammam, Saudi Arabia

27 November 2005

Oman	0–2	Syria
		Ali Mohammed Ali 38'; Anad Osman 86'

Prince Mohamed bin Fahd Stadium, Dammam, Saudi Arabia

=== Group 3 ===
Team	Pld	W	D	L	GF	GA	GD	Pts
United Arab Emirates (H)	2	2	0	0	8	0	+8	6
Yemen	2	1	0	1	3	2	+1	3
Palestine	2	0	0	2	0	9	−9	0

23 November 2005

Yemen	3–0	Palestine
Zakarya Dammag 34' 52'; Abdulrazzaq Al Ashbi 68'

Al-Rashid Stadium, Dubai, UAE

25 November 2005

United Arab Emirates	6–0	Palestine
Abdulla Bloushi 21'; Nasser Hasan 37' 66'; Mohamed Al Shehhi 45+2'; Musalam Al Hamadani 45+3'; Abdulla Saeed 88' (pen.)

Al-Rashid Stadium, Dubai, UAE

27 November 2005

United Arab Emirates	2–0	Yemen
Saeed Al Kathiri 44'; Nasser Hasan 74'

Al-Rashid Stadium, Dubai, UAE

=== Group 4 ===
Team	Pld	W	D	L	GF	GA	GD	Pts
Jordan (H)	2	1	0	1	4	3	+1	3
Bahrain	2	1	0	1	2	2	0	3
Qatar	2	1	0	1	3	4	−1	3

2 February 2006

Qatar	1–4	Jordan
Ali Afif 31'		Lo'ay Omran 25'; Anas Hijah 32'; Ahmed Nofal 67'; Adnan Adous 76'

King Abdullah Stadium, Amman, Jordan

4 February 2006

Jordan	0–2	Bahrain
		Yusef Ali 23'; Hamood Al Yazidi 32'

King Abdullah Stadium, Amman, Jordan

27 November 2005

Bahrain	0–2	Qatar
		Yusef Ali 23'; Hamood Al Yazidi 32'

King Abdullah Stadium, Amman, Jordan

=== Group 5 ===
Team	Pld	W	D	L	GF	GA	GD	Pts
Tajikistan (H)	2	1	1	0	8	0	+8	4
Uzbekistan	2	1	1	0	3	0	+3	4
Pakistan	2	0	0	2	0	11	−11	0

23 November 2005

Uzbekistan	3–0	Pakistan

Dushanbe, Tajikistan

25 November 2005

Pakistan	0–8	Tajikistan

Dushanbe, Tajikistan

27 November 2005

Tajikistan	0–0	Uzbekistan

Dushanbe, Tajikistan

=== Group 6 ===
Team	Pld	W	D	L	GF	GA	GD	Pts
Kyrgyzstan	2	2	0	0	3	0	+3	6
Nepal	2	0	0	2	0	3	−3	0
Timor-Leste	0	0	0	0	0	0	0	0

22 November 2005

Nepal	0–1	Kyrgyzstan

Kathmandu, Nepal

28 November 2005

Kyrgyzstan	2–0	Nepal

Bishkek, Kyrgyzstan

=== Group 7 ===
Team	Pld	W	D	L	GF	GA	GD	Pts
Australia	2	2	0	0	7	0	+7	6
Sri Lanka (H)	2	1	0	1	2	5	−3	3
Turkmenistan	2	0	0	2	1	5	−4	0

22 February 2006

Australia	3–0	Turkmenistan

Columbo, Sri Lanka

24 February 2006

Turkmenistan	1–2	Sri Lanka

Columbo, Sri Lanka

26 February 2006

Sri Lanka	0–4	Australia

Columbo, Sri Lanka

=== Group 8 ===
Team	Pld	W	D	L	GF	GA	GD	Pts
Iran	2	2	0	0	7	0	+7	6
Bangladesh	2	0	0	2	0	7	−7	0
Afghanistan	0	0	0	0	0	0	0	0

23 November 2005

Iran	5–0	Bangladesh

Karaj, Iran

27 November 2005

Bangladesh	0–2	Iran

Dhaka, Bangladesh

=== Group 9 ===
Team	Pld	W	D	L	GF	GA	GD	Pts
Malaysia	2	1	0	1	4	3	+1	3
Myanmar	2	1	0	1	3	4	−1	3
Brunei	0	0	0	0	0	0	0	0

12 December 2005

Malaysia	4–2	Myanmar

Kuala Lumpur, Malaysia

16 December 2005

Myanmar	1–0	Malaysia

Thuwunna, Myanmar

=== Group 10 ===
Team	Pld	W	D	L	GF	GA	GD	Pts
Thailand	2	2	0	0	5	1	+4	6
Indonesia	2	0	1	1	2	4	−2	1
Singapore (H)	2	0	1	1	1	3	−2	1

23 November 2005

Thailand	2–0	Singapore
Chainarong Tatong 9'; Anawin Jujeen 44'

Singapore

25 November 2005

Singapore	1–1	Indonesia
Ahmed Jamil 43'		Andro Levandy 90+1'

Singapore

27 November 2005

Indonesia	1–3	Thailand
Ghery Setya Nugraha 5'		Chainarong Tatong 29', 80'; Phanuwat Jinta 90+3'

Singapore

=== Group 11 ===
Team	Pld	W	D	L	GF	GA	GD	Pts
Vietnam (H)	2	1	1	0	5	2	+3	4
Laos	2	1	1	0	2	1	+1	4
Maldives	2	0	0	2	1	5	−4	0

23 November 2005

Laos	1–0	Maldives

Ho Chi Minh City, Vietnam

25 November 2005

Maldives	1–4	Vietnam

Ho Chi Minh City, Vietnam

27 November 2005

Vietnam	1–1	Laos

Ho Chi Minh City, Vietnam

=== Group 12 ===
Team	Pld	W	D	L	GF	GA	GD	Pts
China	2	2	0	0	26	1	+25	6
Macau (H)	2	1	0	1	3	9	−6	3
Guam	2	0	0	2	0	19	−19	0

23 November 2005

China	17–0	Guam

Macau

25 November 2005

Guam	0–2	Macau

Macau

27 November 2005

Macau	1–9	China

Macau

=== Group 13 ===
Team	Pld	W	D	L	GF	GA	GD	Pts
South Korea (H)	2	2	0	0	15	0	+15	6
Hong Kong	2	1	0	1	4	5	−1	3
Mongolia	2	0	0	2	3	17	−14	0

23 November 2005

South Korea	13–0	Mongolia

Paju, South Korea

25 November 2005

Mongolia	3–4	Hong Kong

Paju, South Korea

27 November 2005

Hong Kong	0–2	South Korea

Paju, South Korea

=== Group 14 ===
Team	Pld	W	D	L	GF	GA	GD	Pts
Japan (H)	2	2	0	0	6	0	+6	6
North Korea	2	1	0	1	5	1	+4	3
Chinese Taipei	2	0	0	2	0	10	−10	0

23 November 2005

Chinese Taipei	0–5	Japan
		Umesaki 10'; Yanagisawa 41'; Kawahara 64' 68'; Morishima 89'

Kumamoto, Japan

25 November 2005

North Korea	5–0	Chinese Taipei
Kim Kyong-Il 11'; Pak Nam-Chol 15'; An Jong-Ho 50', 74'; Pak Chol-Min 56'

Kumamoto, Japan

27 November 2005

Japan	1–0	North Korea
Yasuda 84'

Kumamoto, Japan

== See also ==
- AFC Youth Championship
- 2006 AFC Youth Championship
