= Pablo Pozo =

Chilean football referee

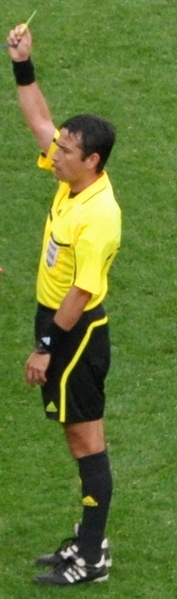
- Full name: Pablo Antonio Pozo Quinteros
- Born: 27 March 1973 (age 53); San Vicente de Tagua Tagua, Chile

International
| Years | League | Role |
| 1998-2010 | FIFA | Referee |

Pablo Antonio Pozo Quinteros (born March 27, 1973) is a former Chilean football referee. In 2008 Pozo refereed in the Beijing Olympics and the FIFA Club World Cup in Japan.

In the 2010 FIFA World Cup in South Africa Pozo became the first Chilean to referee a World Cup since Mario Sanchez Yanten participated in the 1998 World Cup in France. He was originally scheduled to take charge of the first-round match between Algeria and Slovenia in Johannesburg on Sunday, 13 June, but suffered an injury several days beforehand. FIFA named Carlos Batres of Guatemala as his replacement.

On June 18, FIFA designated him as the referee for the Group G match between Portugal and Korea DPR in Cape Town Stadium, Cape Town on Monday, June 21. Three days later he officiated in a Group E game between Cameroon and the Netherlands at the same venue.

His last game as a referee was a match between Audax Italiano and Unión Española on December 19, 2010.

== Personal life ==
Both his father, Juan, and his younger brother, Nicolás, was/is professional referees. His older brother, Mauricio, is a former Chile international footballer.
