= 2008 FIFA Club World Cup =

FIFA Club World Cup Japan 2008 presented by Toyota Toyota プレゼンツ FIFAクラブワールドカップ ジャパン2008

Tournament details
- Host country: Japan
- Dates: 11–21 December
- Teams: 7 (from 6 confederations)
- Venues: 3 (in 3 host cities)

Final positions
- Champions: (England) Manchester United (1st title)
- Runners-up: (Ecuador) LDU Quito
- Third place: (Japan) Gamba Osaka
- Fourth place: (Mexico) Pachuca

Tournament statistics
- Matches played: 8
- Goals scored: 23 (2.88 per match)
- Attendance: 355,515 (44,439 per match)
- Top scorer(s): Wayne Rooney (Manchester United); 3 goals
- Best player: Wayne Rooney (Manchester United)
- Fair play award: (Australia) Adelaide United

The 2008 FIFA Club World Cup (officially known as the FIFA Club World Cup Japan 2008 presented by Toyota for sponsorship reasons) was the fifth FIFA Club World Cup, a football tournament for the champion clubs from each of FIFA's six continental confederations. The tournament was held in Japan from 11 to 21 December 2008.

Defending champions Milan did not qualify, having been eliminated in the round of 16 of the 2007–08 UEFA Champions League. The winners of that competition, Manchester United, won the Club World Cup for the first time, beating Gamba Osaka 5–3 in the semi-finals before a 1–0 win over LDU Quito in the final at the International Stadium in Yokohama on 21 December. It was United's second world title, following the 1999 Intercontinental Cup, which was also held in Japan. It was also the first edition in which the CONMEBOL representative did not hail from either Argentina or Brazil.

The fifth-place match, dropped for the 2007 tournament, was reintroduced for 2008, with the total prize money being increased by US$500,000 to US$16.5 million. The winners took away US$5 million, the losing finalists US$4 million, the third-placed team US$2.5 million, the fourth-placed team US$2 million, the fifth-placed team US$1.5 million, the sixth-placed team US$1 million and the seventh-placed team US$500,000.

== Host bids ==
On 13 August 2007, the Organising Committee for the FIFA Club World Cup recommended to the FIFA Executive Committee that Japan should host the 2008 tournament. This was approved by the executive committee on 29 October 2007 during their meeting in Zürich, Switzerland.

== Qualified teams ==
Location of teams of the 2008 FIFA Club World Cup

Team	Confederation	Qualification	Participation
Entering in the semi-finals
(England) Manchester United	UEFA	Winners of the 2007–08 UEFA Champions League	2nd (Previous: 2000)
(Ecuador) LDU Quito	CONMEBOL	Winners of the 2008 Copa Libertadores	Debut
Entering in the quarter-finals
(Egypt) Al Ahly	CAF	Winners of the 2008 CAF Champions League	3rd (Previous: 2005, 2006)
(Japan) Gamba Osaka	AFC	Winners of the 2008 AFC Champions League	Debut
(Mexico) Pachuca	CONCACAF	Winners of the 2008 CONCACAF Champions' Cup	2nd (Previous: 2007)
Entering in the play-off for quarter-finals
(Australia) Adelaide United	AFC (host) (Note: Adelaide United took the host Japan's slot as Gamba Osaka won the 2008 AFC Champions League. As a result, the winners of the 2008 J.League Division 1, later determined to be Kashima Antlers on 6 December 2008, missed out on participating.)	Runners-up of the 2008 AFC Champions League	Debut
(New Zealand) Waitakere United	OFC	Winners of the 2007–08 OFC Champions League	2nd (Previous: 2007)

== Venues ==
Tokyo, Yokohama and Toyota were the three cities to serve as venues for the 2008 FIFA Club World Cup.

Yokohama	Tokyo	Toyota
International Stadium Yokohama	National Stadium	Toyota Stadium
35°30′36.16″N 139°36′22.49″E	35°40′41.00″N 139°42′53.00″E	35°05′04.02″N 137°10′14.02″E
Capacity: 72,327	Capacity: 57,363	Capacity: 45,000
2008 FIFA Club World Cup (Japan)

== Match officials ==
Confederation	Referee	Assistant referees
AFC	(Uzbekistan) Ravshan Irmatov	(Uzbekistan) Abdukhamidullo Rasulov (Kyrgyzstan) Bahadyr Kochkorov
AFC	(Japan) Yuichi Nishimura	(Japan) Toru Sagara (South Korea) Jeong Hae-Sang
CAF	(Algeria) Mohamed Benouza	(Egypt) Nasser Sadek Abdel Nabi (Eritrea) Angesom Ogbamariam
CONCACAF	(Mexico) Benito Archundia	(Mexico) Hector Delgadillo (Mexico) Marvin Rivera
CONMEBOL	(Chile) Pablo Pozo	(Chile) Patricio Basualto (Chile) Julio Díaz
OFC	(New Zealand) Peter O'Leary	(New Zealand) Brent Best (Solomon Islands) Matthew Taro
UEFA	(Spain) Alberto Undiano Mallenco	(Spain) Fermín Martínez (Spain) Juan Carlos Yuste Jiménez

== Matches ==
Play-off for quarter-finals
11 December – Tokyo
(Australia) Adelaide United	2
(New Zealand) Waitakere United	1

Quarter-finals
13 December – Tokyo
(Egypt) Al Ahly	2
(Mexico) Pachuca (a.e.t.)	4
14 December – Toyota
(Australia) Adelaide United	0
(Japan) Gamba Osaka	1

Semi-finals
17 December – Tokyo
(Mexico) Pachuca	0
(Ecuador) LDU Quito	2
18 December – Yokohama
(Japan) Gamba Osaka	3
(England) Manchester United	5
Match for fifth place
18 December – Yokohama
(Egypt) Al Ahly	0
(Australia) Adelaide United	1

Final
21 December – Yokohama
(Ecuador) LDU Quito	0
(England) Manchester United	1
Match for third place
21 December – Yokohama
(Mexico) Pachuca	0
(Japan) Gamba Osaka	1

All times are Japan Standard Time (UTC+9)

=== Play-off for quarter-finals ===
11 December 2008
19:45

Adelaide United (Australia)	2–1	(New Zealand) Waitakere United
Mullen 39'; Dodd 83'	Report	Seaman 34'

National Stadium, Tokyo
Attendance: 19,777
Referee: Mohamed Benouza (Algeria)

=== Quarter-finals ===
13 December 2008
13:45

Al Ahly (Egypt)	2–4 (a.e.t.)	(Mexico) Pachuca
Pinto 28' (o.g.); Flávio 44'	Report	Montes 47'; Giménez 72', 110'; Álvarez 98'

National Stadium, Tokyo
Attendance: 30,158
Referee: Ravshan Irmatov (Uzbekistan)

14 December 2008
19:30

Adelaide United (Australia)	0–1	(Japan) Gamba Osaka
	Report	Endō 23'

Toyota Stadium, Toyota
Attendance: 38,141
Referee: Pablo Pozo (Chile)

=== Semi-finals ===
17 December 2008
19:30

Pachuca (Mexico)	0–2	(Ecuador) LDU Quito
	Report	Bieler 4'; Bolaños 26'

National Stadium, Tokyo
Attendance: 33,366
Referee: Alberto Undiano Mallenco (Spain)

18 December 2008
19:30

Gamba Osaka (Japan)	3–5	(England) Manchester United
Yamazaki 74'; Endō 85' (pen.); Hashimoto 90+1'	Report	Vidić 28'; Ronaldo 45+1'; Rooney 75', 79'; Fletcher 78'

International Stadium Yokohama, Yokohama
Attendance: 67,618
Referee: Benito Archundia (Mexico)

=== Match for fifth place ===
18 December 2008
16:30

Al Ahly (Egypt)	0–1	(Australia) Adelaide United
	Report	Cristiano 7'

International Stadium Yokohama, Yokohama
Attendance: 35,154
Referee: Peter O'Leary (New Zealand)

=== Match for third place ===
21 December 2008
16:30

Pachuca (Mexico)	0–1	(Japan) Gamba Osaka
	Report	Yamazaki 29'

International Stadium Yokohama, Yokohama
Attendance: 62,619
Referee: Pablo Pozo (Chile)

=== Final ===
21 December 2008
19:30

LDU Quito (Ecuador)	0–1	(England) Manchester United
	Report	Rooney 73'

International Stadium Yokohama, Yokohama
Attendance: 68,682
Referee: Ravshan Irmatov (Uzbekistan)

== Goalscorers ==
Rank	Player	Team	Goals
1	(England) Wayne Rooney	(England) Manchester United	3
2	(Japan) Yasuhito Endō	(Japan) Gamba Osaka	2
2	(Argentina) Christian Giménez	(Mexico) Pachuca	2
2	(Japan) Masato Yamazaki	(Japan) Gamba Osaka	2
5	(Argentina) Damián Álvarez	(Mexico) Pachuca	1
5	(Argentina) Claudio Bieler	(Ecuador) LDU Quito	1
5	(Ecuador) Luis Bolaños	(Ecuador) LDU Quito	1
5	(Brazil) Cristiano	(Australia) Adelaide United	1
5	(Australia) Travis Dodd	(Australia) Adelaide United	1
5	(Angola) Flávio	(Egypt) Al Ahly	1
5	(Scotland) Darren Fletcher	(England) Manchester United	1
5	(Japan) Hideo Hashimoto	(Japan) Gamba Osaka	1
5	(Mexico) Luis Montes	(Mexico) Pachuca	1
5	(Australia) Daniel Mullen	(Australia) Adelaide United	1
5	(Portugal) Cristiano Ronaldo	(England) Manchester United	1
5	(Wales) Paul Seaman	(New Zealand) Waitakere United	1
5	(Serbia) Nemanja Vidić	(England) Manchester United	1

1 own goal

- (Mexico) Fausto Pinto (Pachuca, against Al Ahly)

== Awards ==
Adidas Golden Ball Toyota Award	Adidas Silver Ball	Adidas Bronze Ball
(England) Wayne Rooney (Manchester United)	(Portugal) Cristiano Ronaldo (Manchester United)	(Argentina) Damián Manso (LDU Quito)
FIFA Fair Play Award
(Australia) Adelaide United
