= Takumi Shimohira =

Japanese footballer

Personal information
- Full name: Takumi Shimohira
- Date of birth: October 6, 1988 (age 38)
- Place of birth: Minoh, Osaka, Japan
- Height: 1.76 m (5 ft 9 in)
- Position: Left back

Team information
- Current team: JEF United Chiba
- Number: 49

Youth career
- 2001–2006: Gamba Osaka Youth

Senior career*
Years	Team	Apps	(Gls)
2007–2011	Gamba Osaka	72	(1)
2012–2013	Omiya Ardija	64	(1)
2014–2018	Yokohama F. Marinos	82	(4)
2018	→ JEF United Chiba (loan)	14	(2)
2019–2020	JEF United Chiba	45	(0)
2021–2024	Nankatsu SC	63	(4)
Medal record
Gamba Osaka
Winner	AFC Champions League	2008
Runner-up	J1 League	2010
Winner	J.League Cup	2007
Winner	Emperor's Cup	2008
Winner	Emperor's Cup	2009
Yokohama F. Marinos
Runner-up	J.League Cup	2018
Runner-up	Emperor's Cup	2017
- * Club domestic league appearances and goals as of 15:05, 16 June 2025 (UTC)

Takumi Shimohira (下平 匠, Shimohira Takumi; born October 6, 1988, in Minoh, Osaka) is a Japanese former football player.

== Career ==
On 12 January 2012, Shimohara was announced at Omiya Ardija on a permanent transfer. On 21 April 2012, before the match against Urawa Reds, Shimohara was spat on by a Urawa supporter, which angered his teammates and motivated them. Urawa went on to lose the match 2–0.

On 8 January 2014, Shimohara joined Yokohama F. Marinos on a permanent transfer. During the 2015 season, Shimohara played in every single match. On 26 April 2017, Shimohara returned to playing football against Albirex Niigata after a 10-month injury layoff. On 21 October 2017, he played as a right-back, which was an unfamiliar position to him.

On 8 August 2018, Shimohara was announced at JEF United Chiba on a four-month loan.

On 21 December 2018, Shimohara was announced at JEF United Chiba on a permanent transfer. On 14 January 2021, the club announced that his contract would expire at the end of the 2020 season.

On 24 February 2021, Shimohara was announced at Nankatsu SC on a permanent transfer. He was excited to join the club, as the club's chairman is Yōichi Takahashi, creator of the Captain Tsubasa manga series. During his first season with Nankatsu SC, he was named in the Best XI for the 2021 Kanto League Division 2.

On 5 November 2024, Shimohara announced his retirement from football.

== Outside football ==
On 14 December 2023, Shimohara announced that he had passed the Information Technology Engineer Examination to become an engineer.

== Club career stats ==
Updated to 2 December 2018.

Club performance			League		Cup		League Cup		Continental		Other		Total	
Season	Club	League	Apps	Goals	Apps	Goals	Apps	Goals	Apps	Goals	Apps	Goals	Apps	Goals
Japan			League		Emperor's Cup		League Cup		AFC		Other^{1}		Total	
2007	Gamba Osaka	J1	3	0	1	0	0	0	-		-		4	0
2008	Gamba Osaka	J1	15	0	2	0	3	0	7	0	2	0	29	0
2009	Gamba Osaka	J1	27	0	3	1	1	0	5	0	-		36	1
2010	Gamba Osaka	J1	6	0	4	1	0	0	4	0	-		14	1
2011	Gamba Osaka	J1	21	1	0	0	2	0	4	0	-		27	1
Total			72	1	10	2	6	0	20	0	2	0	110	3
2012	Omiya Ardija	J1	34	0	4	0	3	0	-		-		41	0
2013	Omiya Ardija	J1	30	1	3	0	3	0	-		-		36	1
Total			64	1	7	0	6	0	-		-		77	1
2014	Yokohama F. Marinos	J1	28	2	1	0	2	0	2	0	1	0	34	2
2015	Yokohama F. Marinos	J1	34	1	2	0	2	0	-		-		38	1
2016	Yokohama F. Marinos	J1	15	1	0	0	1	0	-		-		16	1
2017	Yokohama F. Marinos	J1	5	0	5	0	3	0	-		-		13	0
2018	Yokohama F. Marinos	J1	0	0	0	0	5	0	-		-		5	0
Total			82	4	8	0	13	0	2	0	1	0	106	4
2018	JEF United Chiba	J2	14	2	0	0	-		-		-		14	2
Total			14	2	0	0	-		-		-		14	2
Career total			232	8	25	2	25	0	22	0	3	0	307	10

^{1}Includes Japanese Super Cup, Pan-Pacific Championship, Suruga Bank Championship and FIFA Club World Cup.

== Team honours ==
- AFC Champions League – 2008
- Pan-Pacific Championship – 2008
- Emperor's Cup – 2008, 2009
