= Khalaf Al-Salamah =

Kuwaiti footballer

Khalaf Al Salamah
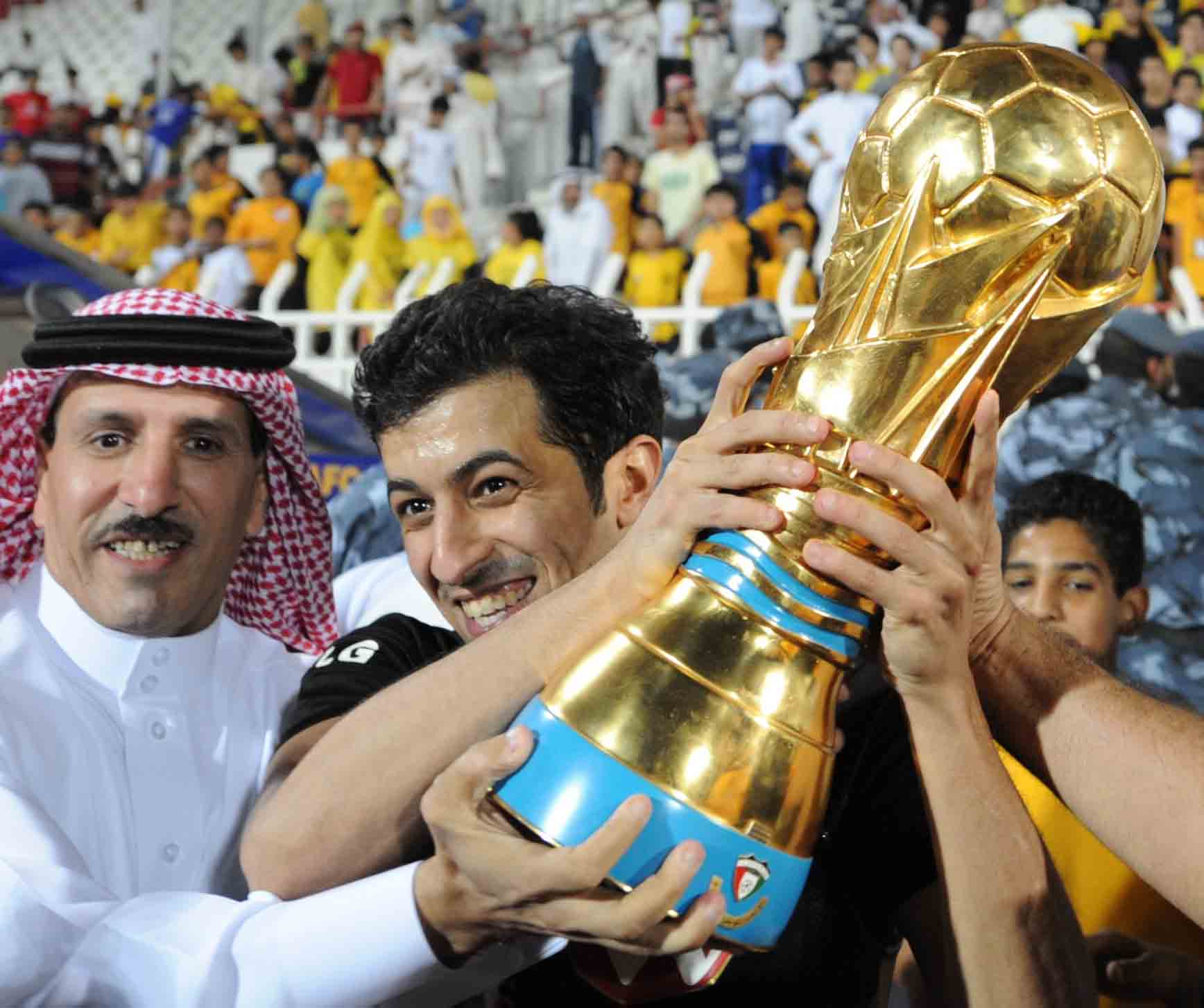
- Champions Club Qadsia in Kuwait. 2009

Personal information
- Full name: Khalaf Salamah Al Mutairi
- Date of birth: July 25, 1979 (age 47)
- Place of birth: Kuwait City, Kuwait
- Height: 1.74 m (5 ft 8 1/2 in)
- Position: Forward

Youth career
- 1995–1999: Al Jahra

Senior career*
Years	Team	Apps	(Gls)
1999–2004	Al Jahra		
2001–2002	→ Kuwait SC (loan)		
2004–2011	Al Qadsia		
2011–2012	→ Al Salmiya (loan)		

International career^{‡}
2000–2008	Kuwait	33	(6)
- * Club domestic league appearances and goals as of January 19, 2011 ‡ National team caps and goals as of January 19, 2011

Khalaf Salamah Al Mutairi (Arabic: خلف سلامة المطيري, born 25 July 1979) is a Kuwaiti footballer who is a forward for the Kuwaiti Premier League club Al Salmiya on loan from Al Qadsia.
