= Yoo Hong-youl =

South Korean footballer

Yoo Hong-Youl
Personal information
- Full name: Yoo Hong-Youl (유홍렬)
- Date of birth: December 30, 1983 (age 42)
- Place of birth: South Korea
- Height: 1.70 m (5 ft 7 in)
- Position: Striker

Youth career
- Soongsil University

Senior career*
Years	Team	Apps	(Gls)
2006–2010	Chunnam Dragons	16	(1)
2011–2012	Daejeon KHNP	21	(3)
2013	TTM Lopburi		
- * Club domestic league appearances and goals

Yoo Hong-Youl (born December 30, 1983) is a South Korean football player who currently plays for TTM Lopburi in the Thai Division 1 League.
