= MHSK Stadium =

Stadium in Tashkent, Uzbekistan

Coordinates: 41°16′47.98″N 67°12′45.41″E

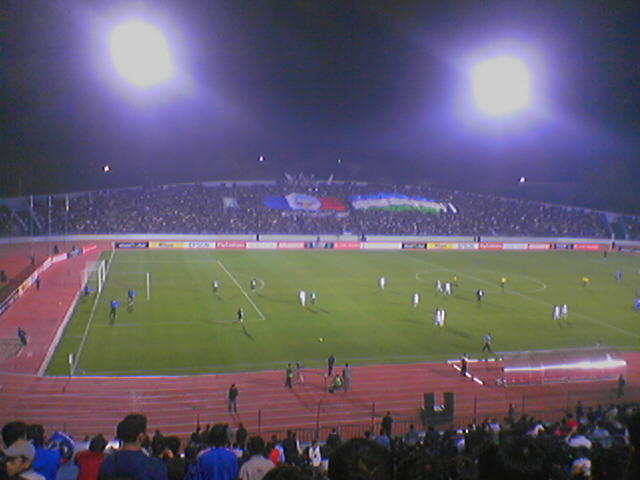
- Interactive map of MHSK Stadium
- Full name: Markaziy Harbiy Sportklubi Army Stadium
- Location: Tashkent, Uzbekistan
- Capacity: 16,000
- Surface: Grass
- Field size: 109 x 71 m

Construction
- Opened: 1986
- Renovated: 2007-08

Tenant
- FC Bunyodkor

The Markaziy Harbiy Sportklubi Army Stadium, commonly known as the MHSK Stadium was a multi-use stadium in the Chilanzar area of Tashkent, Uzbekistan. It was used mostly for football matches and was the home stadium of FC Bunyodkor.

== History ==
The stadium was built in 1986, and initially held 21,000. Reconstruction during 2007-08 reduced the capacity to 16,000. Stadium was completely demolished in 2008–2009. At the place of stadium was built new venue, Bunyodkor Stadium and football academy.
