= Muhsen Basma =

Syrian football referee

- Full name: Muhsen Basma
- Born: October 21, 1966 (age 60); Syria

International
Years	League	Role
2003–2010s	FIFA-listed	Referee

Muhsen Basma (Arabic: محسن بسمة) (born October 21, 1966) is a former Syrian football referee. He has been a FIFA international referee since 2003. He has refereed games at 2007 AFC Asian Cup, a semifinal of the AFC Champions League 2008 and qualifiers for 2006 FIFA World Cup and 2010 FIFA World Cup.
