= Sun Baojie =

Chinese football referee

Sun Baojie 孙葆洁
- Born: 2 January 1965 (age 61); Jinzhong, Shanxi, China
- Other occupation: Teacher

International
Years	League	Role
1997–2010	FIFA listed	Referee

Sun Baojie
- Simplified Chinese: 孙葆洁
- Traditional Chinese: 孫葆潔
Transcriptions
Standard Mandarin
- Hanyu Pinyin: Sūn Bǎojié
- IPA: [swə́n pàʊ tɕjě]

Sun Baojie (Chinese: 孙葆洁; pinyin: Sūn Bǎojié; Mandarin pronunciation: [swə́n pàʊ tɕjě]; born 2 January 1965) is a retired Chinese football referee. He is also a teacher of Tsinghua University.

He has refereed internationally in the AFC Asian Cup, Tiger Cup, and qualifiers for the 1998, 2006, and 2010 World Cups. Sun officiated the 2001 FIFA World Youth Championship, taking charge of the opening match between Argentina and Finland. He is also a referee at the AFC Champions League and Chinese Super League. During 1999, Sun also spent a stint in Major League Soccer as part of a referee exchange program.

After reaching the FIFA age limit and retiring as a match official, Sun has served as a member of the Refereeing Committee of the Asian Football Confederation.
