= Michihiro Yasuda =

Japanese footballer

Michihiro Yasuda 安田 理大
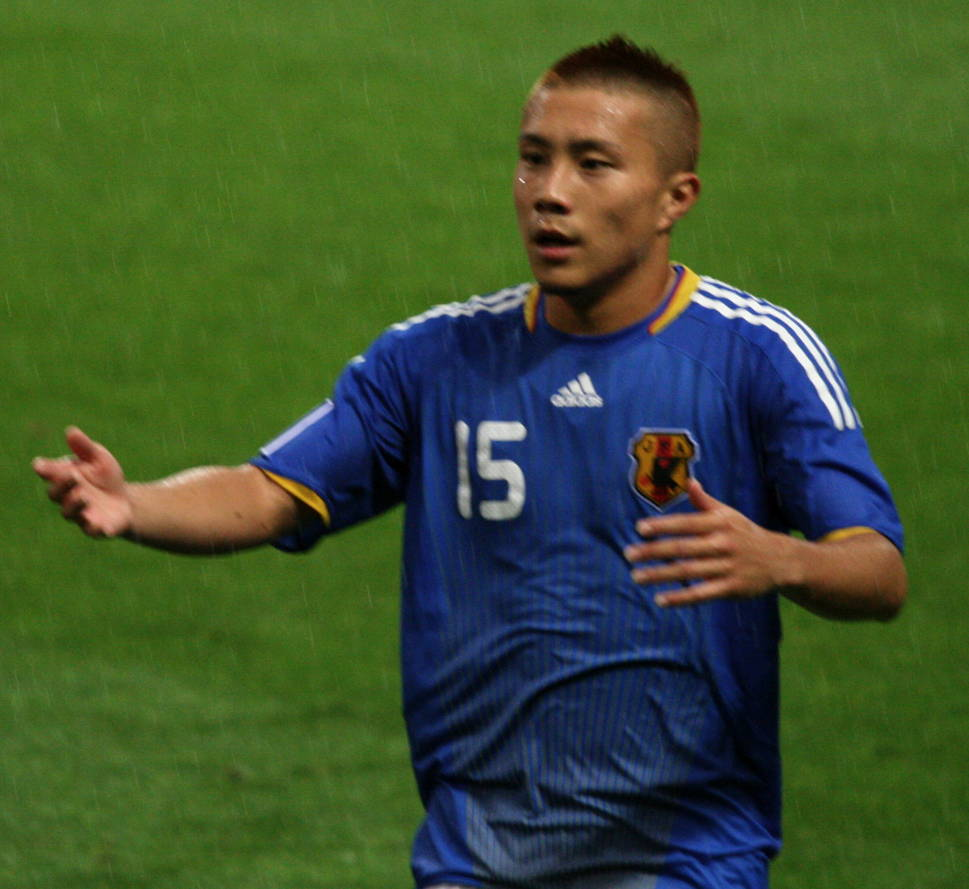
- Yasuda with Japan in 2008

Personal information
- Full name: Michihiro Yasuda
- Date of birth: 20 December 1987 (age 38)
- Place of birth: Kobe, Hyōgo, Japan
- Height: 1.73 m (5 ft 8 in)
- Position: Full back

Youth career
- 1997–2005: Gamba Osaka

Senior career*
| Years | Team | Apps | (Gls) |
| 2006–2010 | Gamba Osaka | 111 | (1) |
| 2011–2013 | Vitesse Arnhem | 45 | (0) |
| 2013 | Júbilo Iwata | 7 | (0) |
| 2014 | Sagan Tosu | 33 | (1) |
| 2015 | Vissel Kobe | 12 | (0) |
| 2016 | Nagoya Grampus | 22 | (0) |
| 2017 | Busan IPark | 20 | (1) |
| 2018 | Albirex Niigata | 30 | (6) |
| 2019–2021 | JEF United Chiba | 70 | (1) |
| 2022 | Matsumoto Yamaga FC | 5 | (0) |

International career^{‡}
| 2005–2007 | Japan U20 | 6 | (3) |
| 2008 | Japan U23 | 3 | (0) |
| 2008–2011 | Japan | 7 | (1) |
Medal record
Gamba Osaka
| Winner | AFC Champions League | 2008 |
| Runner-up | J1 League | 2010 |
| Winner | J.League Cup | 2007 |
| Winner | Emperor's Cup | 2008 |
| Winner | Emperor's Cup | 2009 |
| Runner-up | Emperor's Cup | 2006 |
- * Club domestic league appearances and goals ‡ National team caps and goals as of 2 September 2011

Michihiro Yasuda (安田 理大, Yasuda Michihiro; born 20 December 1987) is a Japanese former professional footballer player who played as a full back. He also represented the Japan national team until 2011.

His younger brother Kodai was also a professional footballer.

== Club career ==
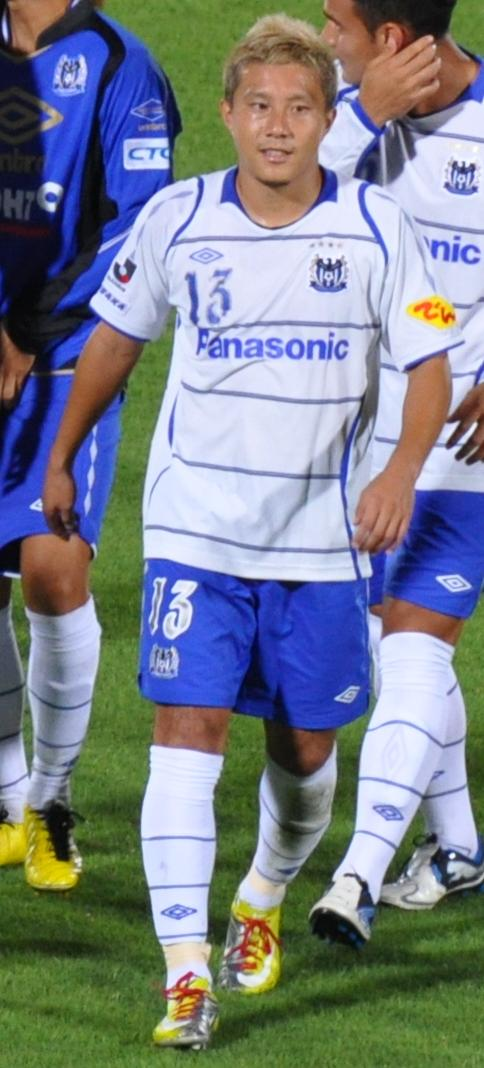
Yasuda playing for Gamba Osaka in 2010

Yasuda was born in Kobe on 20 December 1987, and was raised in Suita, Osaka from the age of five. He joined Gamba Osaka from youth team in 2006. On 5 January 2011 a deal was announced between Gamba Osaka and Dutch side Vitesse Arnhem. Yasuda is the first Japanese footballer at Vitesse Arnhem.

On 26 January 2022, Yasuda announced would be joining to Matsumoto Yamaga.

After leaving from the club, On 4 January 2023, Yasuda was announced would retirement from football after 16 years career as professional football.

== National team career ==
In July 2007, Yasuda was elected Japan U-20 national team for 2007 U-20 World Cup. At this tournament, he played all 4 matches as mainly left side back. In August 2008, he was elected Japan U-23 national team for 2008 Summer Olympics. At this tournament, he played 1 match.

In February 2008, Yasuda was elected Japan national team for 2008 East Asian Football Championship. At this tournament, on 17 February, he debuted against North Korea.

== Career statistics ==
=== Club ===
Appearances and goals by club, season and competition
| Club | Season | League | | | National cup (Note: Includes Emperors Cup, KNVB Cup, Korean FA Cup) | | League cup (Note: Includes J.League Cup) | | Continental | | Other | | Total | |
| Club | Season | Division | Apps | Goals | Apps | Goals | Apps | Goals | Apps | Goals | Apps | Goals | Apps | Goals |
|---|---|---|---|---|---|---|---|---|---|---|---|---|---|---|
| Gamba Osaka | 2006 | J.League Division 1 | 2 | 0 | 0 | 0 | 0 | 0 | 0 | 0 | 0 | 0 | 2 | 0 |
| Gamba Osaka | 2007 | J.League Division 1 | 29 | 0 | 3 | 0 | 9 | 1 | 0 | 0 | 1 (Note: Appearance in Japanese Super Cup) | 0 | 42 | 1 |
| Gamba Osaka | 2008 | J.League Division 1 | 26 | 0 | 4 | 0 | 3 | 0 | 9 (Note: Appearances in AFC Champions League Elite) | 2 | 3 (Note: Appearance in FIFA Club World Cup) | 0 | 45 | 2 |
| Gamba Osaka | 2009 | J.League Division 1 | 22 | 0 | 4 | 0 | 2 | 0 | 7 | 1 | 1 | 0 | 36 | 1 |
| Gamba Osaka | 2010 | J.League Division 1 | 32 | 1 | 5 | 0 | 2 | 0 | 7 | 1 | 1 | 0 | 47 | 2 |
| Gamba Osaka | Total | | 111 | 1 | 16 | 0 | 16 | 1 | 23 | 4 | 6 | 0 | 172 | 6 |
| Vitesse Arnhem | 2010–11 | Eredivisie | 15 | 0 | – | | – | | – | | – | | 15 | 0 |
| Vitesse Arnhem | 2011–12 | Eredivisie | 23 | 0 | 4 | 0 | – | | 1 (Note: Appearance in UEFA Europa League) | 0 | – | | 28 | 0 |
| Vitesse Arnhem | 2012–13 | Eredivisie | 7 | 0 | 2 | 0 | – | | 3 (Note: Appearances in 2012–13 UEFA Europa League qualifying) | 0 | – | | 12 | 0 |
| Vitesse Arnhem | Total | | 45 | 0 | 6 | 0 | 0 | 0 | 4 | 0 | 0 | 0 | 55 | 0 |
| Júbilo Iwata | 2013 | J.League Division 1 | 7 | 0 | – | | – | | – | | – | | 7 | 0 |
| Sagan Tosu | 2014 | J.League Division 1 | 33 | 1 | 3 | 0 | 3 | 1 | – | | – | | 39 | 2 |
| Vissel Kobe | 2015 | J1 League | 12 | 0 | 2 | 0 | 6 | 0 | – | | – | | 20 | 0 |
| Nagoya Grampus | 2016 | J1 League | 22 | 0 | 1 | 0 | 4 | 0 | – | | – | | 27 | 0 |
| Busan IPark | 2017 | K League 2 | 20 | 1 | 4 | 0 | – | | – | | 3 (Note: Appearances in K1 promotion play-offs) | 0 | 27 | 1 |
| Albirex Niigata | 2018 | J2 League | 30 | 6 | 1 | 0 | – | | – | | – | | 31 | 6 |
| JEF United Chiba | 2019 | J2 League | 4 | 0 | 1 | 0 | – | | – | | – | | 5 | 0 |
| JEF United Chiba | 2020 | J2 League | 31 | 1 | 0 | 0 | – | | – | | – | | 31 | 1 |
| JEF United Chiba | 2021 | J2 League | 35 | 0 | 1 | 0 | – | | – | | – | | 36 | 0 |
| JEF United Chiba | Total | | 70 | 1 | 2 | 0 | 0 | 0 | 0 | 0 | 0 | 0 | 72 | 1 |
| Matsumoto Yamaga | 2022 | J3 League | 5 | 0 | 1 | 0 | – | | – | | – | | 6 | 0 |
| Career total | | | 355 | 10 | 36 | 0 | 29 | 2 | 27 | 4 | 9 | 0 | 456 | 16 |

=== International ===
Japan national team
| Year | Apps | Goals |
|---|---|---|
| 2008 | 5 | 0 |
| 2009 | 1 | 1 |
| 2010 | 0 | 0 |
| 2011 | 1 | 0 |
| Total | 7 | 1 |

=== International goals ===
Scores and results list Japan's goal tally first.

==== Under-20 ====
| # | Date | Venue | Opponent | Score | Result | Competition |
|---|---|---|---|---|---|---|
| 1. | 27 November 2005 | KKWing Stadium, Kumamoto, Japan | North Korea | 1–0 | 1–0 | 2006 AFC Youth Championship qualification |

==== Senior team ====
| # | Date | Venue | Opponent | Score | Result | Competition |
|---|---|---|---|---|---|---|
| 1. | 4 February 2009 | National Olympic Stadium, Tokyo, Japan | Finland | 5–1 | 5–1 | Friendly Match |

=== Appearances in major competitions ===
| Team | Competition | Category | Appearances | | Goals | Team record |
| Team | Competition | Category | Start | Sub | Goals | Team record |
|---|---|---|---|---|---|---|
| Japan U-20 | 2006 AFC Youth Championship qualification | U-18 | 0 | 1 | 1 | Qualified |
| Japan U-20 | 2007 FIFA U-20 World Cup | U-20 | 3 | 1 | 0 | Round of 16 |
| Japan U-23 | 2008 Summer Olympics | U-23 | 1 | 0 | 0 | Round 1 |
| Japan | 2010 FIFA World Cup qualification | Senior | 2 | 0 | 0 | Qualified |

== Awards and honours ==
=== Club ===
Gamba Osaka

- Emperor's Cup (2) : 2008, 2009
- J. League Cup (1) : 2007
- Japanese Super Cup (1) : 2007
- AFC Champions League (1) : 2008
- Pan-Pacific Championship (1) : 2008

=== Individual ===
- J. League Cup Most Valuable Player (1) : 2007
- J. League Cup New Hero Award (1) : 2007
