= Masato Yamazaki (footballer, born 1981) =

Japanese footballer

Masato Yamazaki 山﨑 雅人
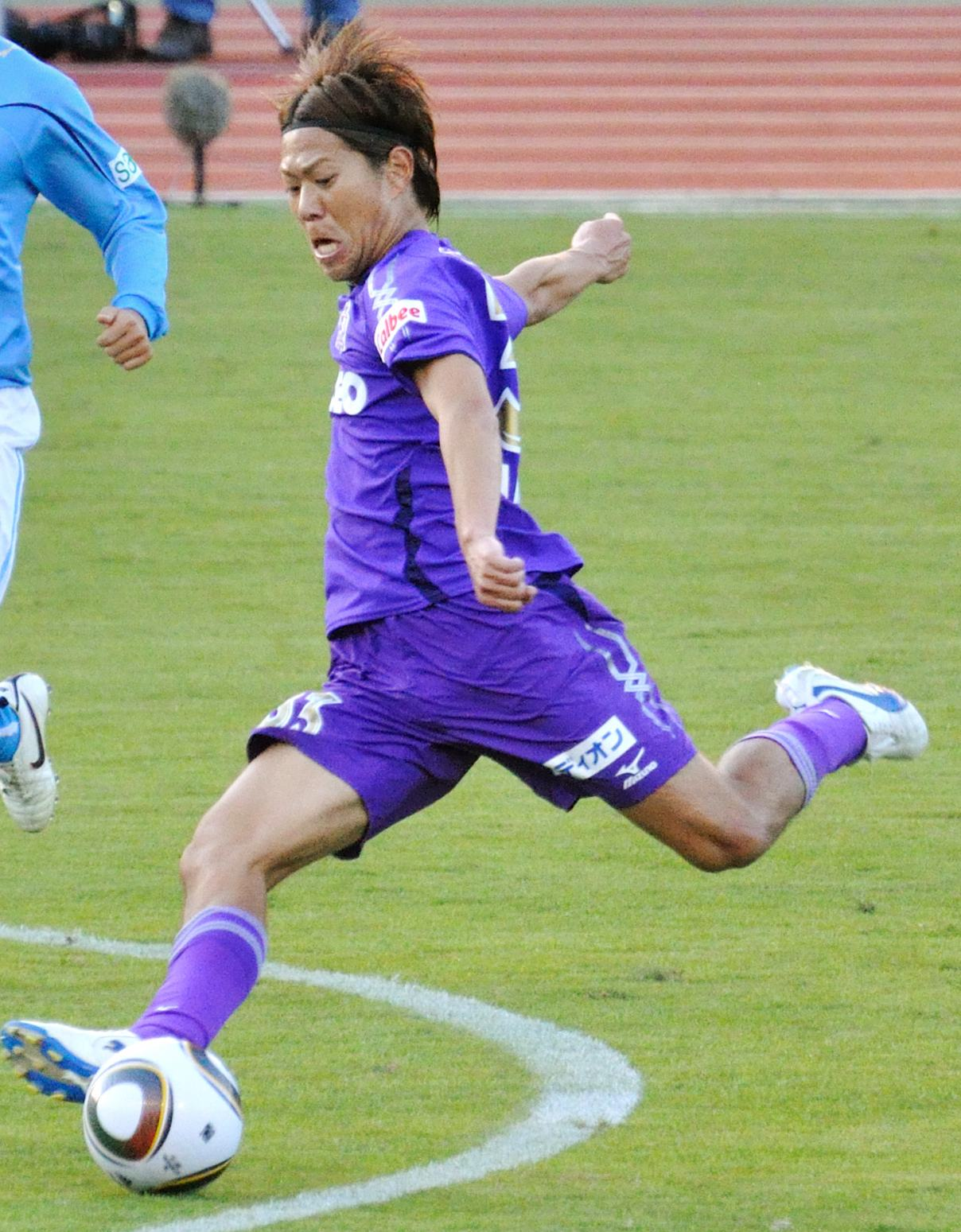
- Yamazaki with Sanfrecce Hiroshima in 2010

Personal information
- Full name: Masato Yamazaki
- Date of birth: December 4, 1981 (age 44)
- Place of birth: Kyoto, Japan
- Height: 1.74 m (5 ft 9 in)
- Position: Forward

Youth career
- 1997–1999: Kumiyama High School
- 2000–2003: Kokushikan University

Senior career*
Years	Team	Apps	(Gls)
2004–2005	Yokohama F. Marinos	15	(0)
2005–2007	Oita Trinita	61	(3)
2008–2009	Gamba Osaka	53	(6)
2010–2011	Sanfrecce Hiroshima	33	(3)
2011–2015	Montedio Yamagata	133	(20)
2016–2018	Zweigen Kanazawa	70	(9)
2018	Thespakusatsu Gunma	14	(1)
Total		379	(42)
Medal record
Yokohama F. Marinos
Winner	J1 League	2004
Gamba Osaka
Winner	AFC Champions League	2008
Winner	Emperor's Cup	2008
Winner	Emperor's Cup	2009
Sanfrecce Hiroshima
Runner-up	J.League Cup	2010
Montedio Yamagata
Runner-up	Emperor's Cup	2014
- * Club domestic league appearances and goals

Masato Yamazaki (山﨑 雅人, Yamazaki Masato; born December 4, 1981) is a Japanese former football player.

Yamazaki played in over 500 league games, playing mainly in the J1 League. In 2014, he scored the winning goal in the promotion playoffs to take Montedio Yamagata to the J1 League.

== Career ==
On 22 July 2011, Yamazaki was announced at Montedio Yamagata on a one year loan.

On 30 December 2011, Yamazaki was announced at Montedio Yamagata on a permanent transfer. On 7 December 2014, he scored the winning goal against JEF United Chiba in the promotion playoffs, meaning that Montedio Yamagata would return to the J1 League for the first time in four years. On 30 December 2014, the club announced that Yamazaki would extend his contract for the 2015 season. During the 2015 season, he was appointed as a vice-captain along with Kodai Watanabe and Masaki Miyasaka.

On 30 December 2015, Yamazaki was announced at Zweigen Kanazawa on a permanent transfer. On 30 December 2016, the club announced that Yamazaki had renewed his contract for the 2017 season. On 30 December 2017, the club announced that he had renewed his contract for the 2018 season.

On 11 December 2018, Yamazaki announced his retirement from football. During his playing days, instead of having Yamazaki on the back of his shirt, he had just "Zaki".

== Coaching career ==
On 28 December 2018, Yamazaki was announced as a member of Oita Trinita's academy staff.

In February 2024, Yamazaki was announced as head coach of Oita Trinita's U18 team.

== Club statistics ==
Club performance			League		Cup		League Cup		Continental		Other		Total	
Season	Club	League	Apps	Goals	Apps	Goals	Apps	Goals	Apps	Goals	Apps	Goals	Apps	Goals
Japan			League		Emperor's Cup		J.League Cup		AFC		Other^{1}		Total	
2000	Kokushikan University	JFL	6	1	-		-		-		-		6	1
2001	Kokushikan University	JFL	12	4	-		-		-		-		12	4
2002	Kokushikan University	JFL	1	0	0	0	-		-		-		1	0
2003	Kokushikan University	JFL	2	0	-		-		-		-		2	0
2004	Yokohama F. Marinos	J1 League	13	0	1	0	6	1	4	1	2	0	26	2
2005	Yokohama F. Marinos	J1 League	2	0	0	0	0	0	4	1	4	0	10	1
2005	Oita Trinita	J1 League	10	2	2	1	0	0	-		-		12	3
2006	Oita Trinita	J1 League	25	0	1	0	4	0	-		-		30	0
2007	Oita Trinita	J1 League	26	1	2	0	6	0	-		-		34	1
2008	Gamba Osaka	J1 League	30	4	5	2	4	0	11	5	6	3	56	14
2009	Gamba Osaka	J1 League	23	2	5	2	0	0	6	1	1	0	35	5
2010	Sanfrecce Hiroshima	J1 League	25	3	1	0	3	0	3	0	-		32	3
2011	Sanfrecce Hiroshima	J1 League	8	0	0	0	1	0	-		-		9	0
2011	Montedio Yamagata	J1 League	14	4	0	0	0	0	-		-		14	4
2012	Montedio Yamagata	J2 League	35	4	1	0	-		-		-		36	4
2013	Montedio Yamagata	J2 League	35	8	3	0	-		-		-		38	8
2014	Montedio Yamagata	J2 League	36	4	6	2	-		-		2	1	44	7
2015	Montedio Yamagata	J1 League	13	0	0	0	3	1	-		-		16	1
2016	Zweigen Kanazawa	J2 League	38	7	0	0	-		-		2	0	40	7
2017	Zweigen Kanazawa	J2 League	28	2	2	0	-		-		-		30	2
2018	Zweigen Kanazawa	J2 League	4	0	1	1	-		-		-		5	1
2018	Thespakusatsu Gunma	J3 League	14	1	-		-		-		-		14	1
Total			400	47	30	8	27	2	28	8	17	4	502	69

^{1}Includes J.League Championship, A3 Champions Cup, Japanese Super Cup, Pan-Pacific Championship, Suruga Bank Championship, FIFA Club World Cup, Promotion Playoffs to J1 and J2/J3 Playoffs.

== Team honors ==
Yokohama F. Marinos

- J1 League - 2004

Gamba Osaka

- AFC Champions League - 2008
- Pan-Pacific Championship - 2008
- Emperor's Cup - 2008, 2009
