= Suguru Hino =

Japanese footballer

Suguru Hino 日野 優
Personal information
- Full name: Suguru Hino
- Date of birth: July 29, 1982 (age 44)
- Place of birth: Suita, Osaka, Japan
- Height: 1.82 m (5 ft 11 1/2 in)
- Position: Goalkeeper

Team information
- Current team: Takasago Mineiro FC
- Number: 33

Youth career
- 1998–2000: Gamba Osaka

Senior career*
Years	Team	Apps	(Gls)
2001–2006	Gamba Osaka	4	(0)
2006–2008	FC Gifu	72	(0)
2009–2010	Tokushima Vortis	15	(0)
2011–2012	Nara Club	27	(0)
2013–2015	Banditonce Kakogawa	40	(0)
2016–	Takasago Mineiro FC		
Total		158	(0)
Medal record
Gamba Osaka
Winner	J1 League	2005
Runner-up	J.League Cup	2005
Runner-up	Emperor's Cup	2006
- * Club domestic league appearances and goals as of end of 2015 season

Suguru Hino (日野 優, Hino Suguru; born July 29, 1982) is a Japanese football player. He plays for Takasago Mineiro FC.

== Playing career ==
Hino was born in Suita on July 29, 1982. He joined J1 League club Gamba Osaka from youth team in 2001. He could not play at all in the match behind Ryota Tsuzuki and Naoki Matsuyo until 2003. He debuted in 2004 Emperor's Cup and played several matches in 2005. Gamba also won the champions in 2005 J1 League. However he could not play many matches because Gamba also gained new goalkeeper Yosuke Fujigaya in 2005. In October 2006, he moved to Regional Leagues club FC Gifu. Gifu was promoted to Japan Football League from 2007. In 2007, he became a regular goalkeeper and played all 34 matches. Gifu also won the 3rd place and was promoted to J2 League from 2008. Although he played as regular goalkeeper, Gifu finished at the 13th place of 15 clubs in 2008 season. In 2009, he moved to J2 club Tokushima Vortis. Although he could not play at all in the match behind Hideaki Ueno in 2009 season, he played 15 matches in 2010 season. In 2011, he moved to Regional Leagues club Nara Club. He played as regular goalkeeper in 2 seasons until 2012. In 2013, he moved to Regional Leagues club Banditonce Kakogawa. He played as regular goalkeeper in 3 seasons until 2015. In 2016, he moved to Regional Leagues club Takasago Mineiro FC.

== Club statistics ==
Club performance			League		Cup		League Cup		Total	
Season	Club	League	Apps	Goals	Apps	Goals	Apps	Goals	Apps	Goals
Japan			League		Emperor's Cup		J.League Cup		Total	
2001	Gamba Osaka	J1 League	0	0	0	0	0	0	0	0
2002	Gamba Osaka	J1 League	0	0	0	0	0	0	0	0
2003	Gamba Osaka	J1 League	0	0	0	0	0	0	0	0
2004	Gamba Osaka	J1 League	0	0	1	0	0	0	1	0
2005	Gamba Osaka	J1 League	4	0	0	0	3	0	7	0
2006	Gamba Osaka	J1 League	0	0	0	0	0	0	0	0
2006	FC Gifu	Regional Leagues	0	0	0	0	-		0	0
2007	FC Gifu	Football League	34	0	3	0	-		37	0
2008	FC Gifu	J2 League	38	0	2	0	-		40	0
2009	Tokushima Vortis	J2 League	0	0	0	0	-		0	0
2010	Tokushima Vortis	J2 League	15	0	1	0	-		16	0
2011	Nara Club	Regional Leagues	14	0	1	0	-		15	0
2012	Nara Club	Regional Leagues	13	0	2	0	-		15	0
2013	Banditonce Kakogawa	Regional Leagues	13	0	-		-		13	0
2014	Banditonce Kakogawa	Regional Leagues	14	0	-		-		14	0
2015	Banditonce Kakogawa	Regional Leagues	13	0	-		-		13	0
Total			158	0	10	0	3	0	171	0
