= 2009 Tokushima Vortis season =

Tokushima Vortis
2009 season
- Manager: Naohiko Minobe
- Stadium: Pocarisweat Stadium
- J. League 2: 9th
- Emperor's Cup: 2nd Round
- Top goalscorer: Takaaki Tokushige (12); Toshiaki Haji (12)

2009 Tokushima Vortis season

== Competitions ==
Competitions	Position
J. League 2	9th / 18 clubs
Emperor's Cup	2nd Round

== Player statistics ==
No.	Pos.	Player	D.o.B. (Age)	Height / Weight	J. League 2		Emperor's Cup		Total	
No.	Pos.	Player	D.o.B. (Age)	Height / Weight	Apps	Goals	Apps	Goals	Apps	Goals
1	GK	Daijiro Takakuwa	August 10, 1973 (aged 35)	cm / kg	0	0				
2	DF	Takashi Miki	July 23, 1978 (aged 30)	cm / kg	46	0				
3	DF	Taisei Fujita	January 31, 1982 (aged 27)	cm / kg	15	1				
4	DF	Hikaru Mita	August 1, 1981 (aged 27)	cm / kg	36	1				
5	DF	Kentoku Noborio	November 30, 1983 (aged 25)	cm / kg	39	5				
6	MF	Kenichiro Meta	July 2, 1982 (aged 26)	cm / kg	38	0				
7	FW	Takaaki Tokushige	February 18, 1975 (aged 34)	cm / kg	50	12				
8	MF	Kazuki Kuranuki	November 10, 1978 (aged 30)	cm / kg	49	3				
9	FW	Kim Dong-Sub	March 29, 1989 (aged 19)	cm / kg	10	0				
10	FW	Fábio	April 21, 1987 (aged 21)	cm / kg	30	3				
11	MF	Koji Kataoka	June 19, 1977 (aged 31)	cm / kg	1	0				
13	FW	Yoichiro Kakitani	January 3, 1990 (aged 19)	cm / kg	27	4				
14	FW	Yuki Ishida	November 4, 1980 (aged 28)	cm / kg	49	7				
15	MF	Jun Aoyama	January 3, 1988 (aged 21)	cm / kg	45	2				
16	MF	Yuya Hikichi	May 2, 1983 (aged 25)	cm / kg	15	1				
17	MF	Kazuyuki Mugita	November 10, 1984 (aged 24)	cm / kg	26	1				
18	FW	Toshiaki Haji	August 28, 1978 (aged 30)	cm / kg	51	12				
19	FW	Hiroyuki Hayashi	October 5, 1983 (aged 25)	cm / kg	3	0				
20	DF	Bae Seung-Jin	November 3, 1987 (aged 21)	cm / kg	45	5				
21	GK	Hideaki Ueno	May 31, 1981 (aged 27)	cm / kg	51	0				
22	GK	Suguru Hino	July 29, 1982 (aged 26)	cm / kg	0	0				
23	DF	Kazuto Tsuyuki	August 14, 1984 (aged 24)	cm / kg	19	0				
24	MF	Wataru Inoue	August 7, 1986 (aged 22)	cm / kg	4	0				
25	FW	Yasuaki Oshima	September 1, 1981 (aged 27)	cm / kg	2	0				
26	MF	Satoshi Koizumi	June 9, 1985 (aged 23)	cm / kg	0	0				
27	DF	Hiroaki Ando	June 24, 1986 (aged 22)	cm / kg	0	0				
28	FW	Kota Sugawara	May 22, 1985 (aged 23)	cm / kg	17	2				
29	MF	Takuya Muguruma	June 13, 1984 (aged 24)	cm / kg	28	3				
30	DF	Takahiro Ohara	December 6, 1986 (aged 22)	cm / kg	0	0				
31	FW	Akihiro Sato	October 22, 1986 (aged 22)	cm / kg	17	4				
32	GK	Kazuki Abe	April 18, 1987 (aged 21)	cm / kg	0	0				
33	DF	Masahiro Ishikawa	May 23, 1990 (aged 18)	cm / kg	0	0				
34	FW	Koji Onishi	June 6, 1988 (aged 20)	cm / kg	0	0				

== Other pages ==
- (in Japanese) J. League official site
