= 2010 Tokushima Vortis season =

Tokushima Vortis
2010 season
- Manager: Naohiko Minobe
- Stadium: Pocarisweat Stadium
- J. League 2: 8th
- Emperor's Cup: 3rd Round
- Top goalscorer: Tomohiro Tsuda (16)

The following is information on Tokushima Vortis during the 2010 football season.

== Competitions ==
Competitions	Position
J. League 2	8th / 19 clubs
Emperor's Cup	3rd Round

== Player statistics ==
No.	Pos.	Player	D.o.B. (Age)	Height / Weight	J. League 2		Emperor's Cup		Total	
No.	Pos.	Player	D.o.B. (Age)	Height / Weight	Apps	Goals	Apps	Goals	Apps	Goals
1	GK	Hideaki Ueno	May 31, 1981 (aged 28)	cm / kg	14	0				
2	DF	Takashi Miki	July 23, 1978 (aged 31)	cm / kg	34	0				
3	DF	Naoki Wako	November 26, 1989 (aged 20)	cm / kg	19	0				
4	DF	Hikaru Mita	August 1, 1981 (aged 28)	cm / kg	13	0				
5	DF	Kentoku Noborio	November 30, 1983 (aged 26)	cm / kg	14	1				
6	MF	Kenichiro Meta	July 2, 1982 (aged 27)	cm / kg	0	0				
7	FW	Takaaki Tokushige	February 18, 1975 (aged 35)	cm / kg	31	4				
8	MF	Kazuki Kuranuki	November 10, 1978 (aged 31)	cm / kg	33	2				
9	FW	Kim Dong-Sub	March 29, 1989 (aged 20)	cm / kg	1	0				
10	MF	Yusuke Shimada	January 19, 1982 (aged 28)	cm / kg	30	4				
11	FW	Tomohiro Tsuda	May 6, 1986 (aged 23)	cm / kg	31	16				
13	FW	Yoichiro Kakitani	January 3, 1990 (aged 20)	cm / kg	34	4				
14	MF	Takeshi Hamada	December 21, 1982 (aged 27)	cm / kg	32	3				
15	MF	Jun Aoyama	January 3, 1988 (aged 22)	cm / kg	18	0				
16	MF	Yuya Hikichi	May 2, 1983 (aged 26)	cm / kg	0	0				
17	MF	Kazuyuki Mugita	November 10, 1984 (aged 25)	cm / kg	3	0				
18	FW	Toshiaki Haji	August 28, 1978 (aged 31)	cm / kg	8	0				
19	FW	Ryuichi Hirashige	June 15, 1988 (aged 21)	cm / kg	26	4				
20	DF	Bae Seung-Jin	November 3, 1987 (aged 22)	cm / kg	31	1				
21	GK	Oh Seung-Hoon	June 30, 1988 (aged 21)	cm / kg	7	0				
22	DF	Kosuke Yatsuda	March 17, 1982 (aged 27)	cm / kg	0	0				
23	GK	Suguru Hino	July 29, 1982 (aged 27)	cm / kg	15	0				
24	MF	Wataru Inoue	August 7, 1986 (aged 23)	cm / kg	5	0				
25	DF	Takashi Hirajima	February 3, 1982 (aged 28)	cm / kg	36	2				
26	DF	Yuya Hashiuchi	July 13, 1987 (aged 22)	cm / kg	6	0				
27	DF	Hiroaki Ando	June 24, 1986 (aged 23)	cm / kg	0	0				
28	FW	Takuma Oka	July 13, 1991 (aged 18)	cm / kg	0	0				
29	MF	Takuya Muguruma	June 13, 1984 (aged 25)	cm / kg	24	1				
30	DF	Takahiro Ohara	December 6, 1986 (aged 23)	cm / kg	0	0				
30	FW	Douglas	December 30, 1987 (aged 22)	cm / kg	13	4				
31	FW	Akihiro Sato	October 22, 1986 (aged 23)	cm / kg	26	5				
32	GK	Kazuki Abe	April 18, 1987 (aged 22)	cm / kg	0	0				
33	DF	Masahiro Ishikawa	May 23, 1990 (aged 19)	cm / kg	0	0				
34	FW	Koji Onishi	June 6, 1988 (aged 21)	cm / kg	0	0				
35	FW	Kota Sugawara	May 22, 1985 (aged 24)	cm / kg	0	0				

== Other pages ==
- (in Japanese) J. League official site
