= Atsushi Kimura =

Japanese footballer

Atsushi Kimura 木村 敦志
Personal information
- Full name: Atsushi Kimura
- Date of birth: May 1, 1984 (age 42)
- Place of birth: Ibaraki, Osaka, Japan
- Height: 1.84 m (6 ft 0 in)
- Position: Goalkeeper

Youth career
- 2000–2002: Gamba Osaka

Senior career*
Years	Team	Apps	(Gls)
2003–2014	Gamba Osaka	6	(0)
Total		6	(0)
Medal record
Gamba Osaka
Winner	AFC Champions League	2008
Winner	J1 League	2005
Winner	J1 League	2014
Runner-up	J1 League	2010
Winner	J.League Cup	2007
Winner	J.League Cup	2014
Runner-up	J.League Cup	2005
Winner	Emperor's Cup	2008
Winner	Emperor's Cup	2009
Winner	Emperor's Cup	2014
Runner-up	Emperor's Cup	2006
Runner-up	Emperor's Cup	2012
- * Club domestic league appearances and goals

Atsushi Kimura (木村 敦志, Kimura Atsushi; born May 1, 1984) is a former Japanese football player.

== Club career ==
Kimura was born in Ibaraki on May 1, 1984. He joined Gamba Osaka from youth team in 2003. However he could hardly play in the match, behind Naoki Matsuyo and Yosuke Fujigaya. In December 2009, he debuted in Emperor's Cup semifinal. In May 2012, he became a regular goalkeeper. However he got hurt in June. He lost his opportunity to play. He retired end of 2014 season.

== National team career ==
In September 2001, Kimura was selected Japan U-17 national team for 2001 U-17 World Championship, but he did not play in the match behind Kenta Tokushige.

== Club statistics ==
Club performance			League		Cup		League Cup		Continental		Total	
Season	Club	League	Apps	Goals	Apps	Goals	Apps	Goals	Apps	Goals	Apps	Goals
Japan			League		Emperor's Cup		J.League Cup		Asia		Total	
2003	Gamba Osaka	J1 League	0	0	0	0	0	0	-		0	0
2004	Gamba Osaka	J1 League	0	0	0	0	0	0	-		0	0
2005	Gamba Osaka	J1 League	0	0	0	0	0	0	-		0	0
2006	Gamba Osaka	J1 League	0	0	0	0	0	0	0	0	0	0
2007	Gamba Osaka	J1 League	0	0	0	0	0	0	-		0	0
2008	Gamba Osaka	J1 League	0	0	0	0	0	0	0	0	0	0
2009	Gamba Osaka	J1 League	0	0	1	0	0	0	0	0	1	0
2010	Gamba Osaka	J1 League	0	0	0	0	0	0	2	0	2	0
2011	Gamba Osaka	J1 League	0	0	0	0	0	0	0	0	0	0
2012	Gamba Osaka	J1 League	6	0	0	0	0	0	1	0	7	0
2013	Gamba Osaka	J2 League	0	0	0	0	-		-		0	0
2014	Gamba Osaka	J1 League	0	0	0	0	0	0	-		0	0
Total			6	0	1	0	0	0	3	0	10	0
