= List of Grand Prix motorcycle racers: U =

Name	Seasons	World Championships	MotoGP Wins	500cc Wins	350cc Wins	Moto2 Wins	250cc Wins	Moto3 Wins	125cc Wins	80cc Wins	50cc Wins
(Italy) Carlo Ubbiali	1949-1960	9; 250cc - 1956, 1959-1960; 125cc - 1951, 1955-1956, 1958-1960	0	0	0	0	13	0	26	0	0
(Japan) Tsutomu Udagawa	1990-1993	0	0	0	0	0	0	0	0	0	0
(Netherlands) Ed Uding	?	0	0	0	0	0	0	0	0	0	0
(Japan) Noboru Ueda	1991-2002	0	0	0	0	0	0	0	13	0	0
(Japan) Hideaki Ueno	1991	0	0	0	0	0	0	0	0	0	0
(Japan) Katsuji Uezu	1997, 1999-2000	0	0	0	0	0	0	0	0	0	0
(Japan) Youichi Ui	1995-2004, 2006-2007	0	0	0	0	0	0	0	11	0	0
(Japan) Tohru Ukawa	1994-2005	0	1	0	0	0	4	0	0	0	0
(Austria) Robert Ulm	?	0	0	0	0	0	0	0	0	0	0
(Germany) Stephan Ulrich	?	0	0	0	0	0	0	0	0	0	0
(Italy) Franco Uncini	1976-1985	1; 500cc - 1982	0	5	0	0	2	0	0	0	0
(Australia) Brett Underwood	2003	0	0	0	0	0	0	0	0	0	0
(Japan) Hisashi Unemoto	1988-1992	0	0	0	0	0	0	0	0	0	0
(Germany) Franz Ungar	?	0	0	0	0	0	0	0	0	0	0
(Germany) Patrick Unger	2002-2005, 2007	0	0	0	0	0	0	0	0	0	0
(Germany) Malcolm Uphill	1968-1970	0	0	0	0	0	0	0	0	0	0
(United Kingdom) Dominic Usher	?	0	0	0	0	0	0	0	0	0	0
(Spain) Joan Uviña	?	0	0	0	0	0	0	0	0	0	0
