= Takashi Miki =

Japanese footballer

Takashi Miki 三木 隆司
Personal information
- Full name: Takashi Miki
- Date of birth: July 23, 1978 (age 48)
- Place of birth: Sagamihara, Japan
- Height: 1.79 m (5 ft 10 1/2 in)
- Position: Defender

Youth career
- 1994–1996: Takigawa Daini High School

Senior career*
Years	Team	Apps	(Gls)
1997–1999	Bellmare Hiratsuka	34	(0)
2000–2007	Oita Trinita	216	(2)
2008	Nagoya Grampus	4	(0)
2009–2013	Tokushima Vortis	141	(0)
Total		395	(2)
- * Club domestic league appearances and goals

Takashi Miki (三木 隆司, Miki Takashi; born July 23, 1978) is a former Japanese football player. He is the current assistant manager of Nagoya Grampus.

== Playing career ==
Miki was born in Sagamihara on July 23, 1978. After graduating from high school, he joined J1 League club Bellmare Hiratsuka in 1997. He played many matches as center back. However the club was relegated to J2 League end of 1999 season. In 2000, he moved to J2 club Oita Trinita. He played many matches as center back. In 2002, he became a regular player and the club won the champions and was promoted to J1 from 2003. Although he played as regular player, his opportunity to play decreased in 2007. In 2008, he moved to Nagoya Grampus. However he could hardly play in the match. In 2009, he moved to J2 club Tokushima Vortis. Although he played as regular player until 2011, his opportunity to play decreased from 2012. Although the club was promoted to J1 from 2014, he retired end of 2013 season without playing J1.

== Career statistics ==
Appearances and goals by club, season and competition
Club	Season	League			Emperor's Cup		J.League Cup		Total	
Club	Season	Division	Apps	Goals	Apps	Goals	Apps	Goals	Apps	Goals
Bellmare Hiratsuka	1997	J1 League	3	0	0	0	0	0	3	0
Bellmare Hiratsuka	1998	J1 League	13	0	1	0	3	0	17	0
Bellmare Hiratsuka	1999	J1 League	18	0	1	0	2	0	21	0
Oita Trinita	2000	J2 League	23	0	3	0	1	0	27	0
Oita Trinita	2001	J2 League	23	0	0	0	4	0	27	0
Oita Trinita	2002	J2 League	44	0	0	0	—		44	0
Oita Trinita	2003	J1 League	30	0	1	0	3	0	34	0
Oita Trinita	2004	J1 League	23	1	2	0	3	0	28	1
Oita Trinita	2005	J1 League	23	0	2	0	4	0	29	0
Oita Trinita	2006	J1 League	31	0	2	1	5	0	38	1
Oita Trinita	2007	J1 League	19	1	0	0	6	0	25	1
Nagoya Grampus	2008	J1 League	4	0	1	0	5	0	10	0
Tokushima Vortis	2009	J2 League	46	0	0	0	—		46	0
Tokushima Vortis	2010	J2 League	34	0	2	0	—		36	0
Tokushima Vortis	2011	J2 League	35	0	1	0	—		36	0
Tokushima Vortis	2012	J2 League	17	0	1	0	—		18	0
Tokushima Vortis	2013	J2 League	9	0	0	0	—		9	0
Career total			395	2	17	1	36	0	448	3
