= 2009 Gamba Osaka season =

Gamba Osaka
2009 season
- Manager: Akira Nishino
- Stadium: Osaka Expo '70 Stadium
- J. League 1: 3rd
- Emperor's Cup: Champions
- J. League Cup: Quarterfinals
- Top goalscorer: Leandro (11)

2009 Gamba Osaka season

== Competitions ==
| Competitions | Position |
|---|---|
| J. League 1 | 3rd / 18 clubs |
| Emperor's Cup | Champions |
| J. League Cup | Quarterfinals |

== Player statistics ==
| No. | Pos. | Player | D.o.B. (Age) | Height / Weight | J. League 1 | | Emperor's Cup | | J. League Cup | | Total | |
| No. | Pos. | Player | D.o.B. (Age) | Height / Weight | Apps | Goals | Apps | Goals | Apps | Goals | Apps | Goals |
|---|---|---|---|---|---|---|---|---|---|---|---|---|
| 1 | GK | Naoki Matsuyo | April 9, 1974 (aged 34) | cm / kg | 13 | 0 | | | | | | |
| 2 | DF | Sota Nakazawa | October 26, 1982 (aged 26) | cm / kg | 26 | 0 | | | | | | |
| 4 | DF | Kazumichi Takagi | November 21, 1980 (aged 28) | cm / kg | 9 | 0 | | | | | | |
| 5 | DF | Satoshi Yamaguchi | April 17, 1978 (aged 30) | cm / kg | 33 | 2 | | | | | | |
| 6 | DF | Park Dong-Hyuk | April 18, 1979 (aged 29) | cm / kg | 9 | 1 | | | | | | |
| 7 | MF | Yasuhito Endō | January 28, 1980 (aged 29) | cm / kg | 32 | 10 | | | | | | |
| 8 | MF | Shinichi Terada | June 10, 1985 (aged 23) | cm / kg | 5 | 1 | | | | | | |
| 9 | FW | Lucas Severino | January 3, 1979 (aged 30) | cm / kg | 30 | 6 | | | | | | |
| 10 | MF | Takahiro Futagawa | June 27, 1980 (aged 28) | cm / kg | 21 | 4 | | | | | | |
| 11 | FW | Ryūji Bando | August 2, 1979 (aged 29) | cm / kg | 21 | 2 | | | | | | |
| 13 | DF | Michihiro Yasuda | December 20, 1987 (aged 21) | cm / kg | 22 | 0 | | | | | | |
| 14 | FW | Shoki Hirai | December 4, 1987 (aged 21) | cm / kg | 1 | 0 | | | | | | |
| 15 | FW | Ryota Miki | April 12, 1985 (aged 23) | cm / kg | 0 | 0 | | | | | | |
| 16 | MF | Hayato Sasaki | November 29, 1982 (aged 26) | cm / kg | 30 | 3 | | | | | | |
| 17 | MF | Tomokazu Myojin | January 24, 1978 (aged 31) | cm / kg | 31 | 2 | | | | | | |
| 18 | FW | Cho Jae-Jin | July 9, 1981 (aged 27) | cm / kg | 25 | 10 | | | | | | |
| 19 | DF | Takumi Shimohira | October 6, 1988 (aged 20) | cm / kg | 27 | 0 | | | | | | |
| 20 | MF | Shu Kurata | November 26, 1988 (aged 20) | cm / kg | 3 | 0 | | | | | | |
| 21 | DF | Akira Kaji | January 13, 1980 (aged 29) | cm / kg | 20 | 0 | | | | | | |
| 22 | GK | Yosuke Fujigaya | February 13, 1981 (aged 28) | cm / kg | 22 | 0 | | | | | | |
| 23 | FW | Leandro | February 12, 1985 (aged 24) | cm / kg | 21 | 11 | | | | | | |
| 24 | FW | Kenta Hoshihara | May 1, 1988 (aged 20) | cm / kg | 0 | 0 | | | | | | |
| 25 | MF | Takuya Takei | January 25, 1986 (aged 23) | cm / kg | 5 | 0 | | | | | | |
| 26 | GK | Yoichi Futori | August 3, 1982 (aged 26) | cm / kg | 0 | 0 | | | | | | |
| 27 | MF | Hideo Hashimoto | May 21, 1979 (aged 29) | cm / kg | 31 | 4 | | | | | | |
| 28 | DF | Shunya Suganuma | May 17, 1990 (aged 18) | cm / kg | 0 | 0 | | | | | | |
| 29 | GK | Atsushi Kimura | May 1, 1984 (aged 24) | cm / kg | 0 | 0 | | | | | | |
| 30 | FW | Masato Yamazaki | December 4, 1981 (aged 27) | cm / kg | 23 | 2 | | | | | | |
| 31 | MF | Kodai Yasuda | August 8, 1989 (aged 19) | cm / kg | 0 | 0 | | | | | | |
| 32 | FW | Shohei Otsuka | April 11, 1990 (aged 18) | cm / kg | 1 | 0 | | | | | | |
| 33 | FW | Takashi Usami | May 6, 1992 (aged 16) | cm / kg | 3 | 0 | | | | | | |
| 39 | FW | Pedro Júnior | January 29, 1987 (aged 22) | cm / kg | 7 | 3 | | | | | | |

== Other pages ==
- (in Japanese) J. League official site
