= 2005 Gamba Osaka season =

Gamba Osaka
2005 season
- Manager: Akira Nishino
- Stadium: Osaka Expo '70 Stadium
- J. League 1: Champions
- Emperor's Cup: Quarterfinals
- J. League Cup: Runners-up
- Top goalscorer: Araújo (33)

2005 Gamba Osaka season

== Competitions ==
Competitions	Position
J. League 1	Champions / 18 clubs
Emperor's Cup	Quarterfinals
J. League Cup	Runners-up

== Domestic results ==
=== J. League 1 ===
Match	Date	Venue	Opponents	Score
1	2005..	[[]]	[[]]	-
2	2005..	[[]]	[[]]	-
3	2005..	[[]]	[[]]	-
4	2005..	[[]]	[[]]	-
5	2005..	[[]]	[[]]	-
6	2005..	[[]]	[[]]	-
7	2005..	[[]]	[[]]	-
8	2005..	[[]]	[[]]	-
9	2005..	[[]]	[[]]	-
10	2005..	[[]]	[[]]	-
11	2005..	[[]]	[[]]	-
12	2005..	[[]]	[[]]	-
13	2005..	[[]]	[[]]	-
14	2005..	[[]]	[[]]	-
15	2005..	[[]]	[[]]	-
16	2005..	[[]]	[[]]	-
17	2005..	[[]]	[[]]	-
18	2005..	[[]]	[[]]	-
19	2005..	[[]]	[[]]	-
20	2005..	[[]]	[[]]	-
21	2005..	[[]]	[[]]	-
22	2005..	[[]]	[[]]	-
23	2005..	[[]]	[[]]	-
24	2005..	[[]]	[[]]	-
25	2005..	[[]]	[[]]	-
26	2005..	[[]]	[[]]	-
27	2005..	[[]]	[[]]	-
28	2005..	[[]]	[[]]	-
29	2005..	[[]]	[[]]	-
30	2005..	[[]]	[[]]	-
31	2005..	[[]]	[[]]	-
32	2005..	[[]]	[[]]	-
33	2005..	[[]]	[[]]	-
34	2005..	[[]]	[[]]	-

=== Emperor's Cup ===
Match	Date	Venue	Opponents	Score
4th Round	2005..	[[]]	[[]]	-
5th Round	2005..	[[]]	[[]]	-
Quarterfinals	2005..	[[]]	[[]]	-

=== J. League Cup ===
Match	Date	Venue	Opponents	Score
GL-B-1	2005..	[[]]	[[]]	-
GL-B-2	2005..	[[]]	[[]]	-
GL-B-3	2005..	[[]]	[[]]	-
GL-B-4	2005..	[[]]	[[]]	-
GL-B-5	2005..	[[]]	[[]]	-
GL-B-6	2005..	[[]]	[[]]	-
Quarterfinals-1	2005..	[[]]	[[]]	-
Quarterfinals-2	2005..	[[]]	[[]]	-
Semifinals-1	2005..	[[]]	[[]]	-
Semifinals-2	2005..	[[]]	[[]]	-
Final	2005..	[[]]	[[]]	-

== Player statistics ==
No.	Pos.	Player	D.o.B. (Age)	Height / Weight	J. League 1		Emperor's Cup		J. League Cup		Total	
No.	Pos.	Player	D.o.B. (Age)	Height / Weight	Apps	Goals	Apps	Goals	Apps	Goals	Apps	Goals
1	GK	Naoki Matsuyo	April 9, 1974 (aged 30)	cm / kg	14	0						
2	DF	Sidiclei	May 13, 1972 (aged 32)	cm / kg	28	1						
3	DF	Toru Irie	July 8, 1977 (aged 27)	cm / kg	9	0						
4	DF	Noritada Saneyoshi	October 19, 1972 (aged 32)	cm / kg	24	1						
5	DF	Tsuneyasu Miyamoto	February 7, 1977 (aged 28)	cm / kg	30	3						
6	DF	Satoshi Yamaguchi	April 17, 1978 (aged 26)	cm / kg	33	3						
7	MF	Yasuhito Endō	January 28, 1980 (aged 25)	cm / kg	33	10						
8	MF	Fernandinho	January 13, 1981 (aged 24)	cm / kg	34	7						
9	FW	Araújo	August 8, 1977 (aged 27)	cm / kg	33	33						
10	MF	Takahiro Futagawa	June 27, 1980 (aged 24)	cm / kg	29	0						
11	FW	Masanobu Matsunami	November 21, 1974 (aged 30)	cm / kg	11	0						
13	MF	Shigeru Morioka	August 12, 1973 (aged 31)	cm / kg	3	0						
14	MF	Akihiro Ienaga	June 13, 1986 (aged 18)	cm / kg	24	0						
15	MF	Mitsuteru Watanabe	April 10, 1974 (aged 30)	cm / kg	22	2						
16	FW	Masashi Oguro	May 4, 1980 (aged 24)	cm / kg	31	16						
17	DF	Arata Kodama	October 8, 1982 (aged 22)	cm / kg	3	0						
18	FW	Kota Yoshihara	February 2, 1978 (aged 27)	cm / kg	19	2						
19	FW	Satoshi Nakayama	November 7, 1981 (aged 23)	cm / kg	0	0						
20	MF	Shinichi Terada	June 10, 1985 (aged 19)	cm / kg	2	0						
21	FW	Ryota Miki	April 12, 1985 (aged 19)	cm / kg	3	0						
22	GK	Yosuke Fujigaya	February 13, 1981 (aged 24)	cm / kg	16	0						
23	GK	Suguru Hino	July 29, 1982 (aged 22)	cm / kg	4	0						
24	MF	Toshihiro Matsushita	October 17, 1983 (aged 21)	cm / kg	14	0						
25	DF	Daiki Niwa	January 16, 1986 (aged 19)	cm / kg	0	0						
26	DF	Naoki Kogure	June 14, 1984 (aged 20)	cm / kg	0	0						
27	MF	Hideo Hashimoto	May 21, 1979 (aged 25)	cm / kg	33	1						
28	MF	Masafumi Maeda	January 25, 1983 (aged 22)	cm / kg	6	1						
29	MF	Yasunobu Matsuoka	May 2, 1986 (aged 18)	cm / kg	0	0						
30	DF	Ryota Aoki	August 19, 1984 (aged 20)	cm / kg	3	0						
31	GK	Atsushi Kimura	May 1, 1984 (aged 20)	cm / kg	0	0						
32	MF	Ryunosuke Okamoto	October 9, 1984 (aged 20)	cm / kg	0	0						

== Other pages ==
- (in Japanese) J. League official site
