= Takaaki Tokushige =

Japanese footballer

Takaaki Tokushige 徳重 隆明
Personal information
- Full name: Takaaki Tokushige
- Date of birth: February 18, 1975 (age 51)
- Place of birth: Satsumasendai, Kagoshima, Japan
- Height: 1.74 m (5 ft 8 1/2 in)
- Position: Midfielder

Youth career
- 1990–1992: Reimei High School

Senior career*
Years	Team	Apps	(Gls)
1993–2001	Denso		
2002–2006	Cerezo Osaka	102	(12)
2007–2008	Kyoto Sanga FC	60	(8)
2009–2012	Tokushima Vortis	129	(20)
2013–2014	Nagoya SC		
Total		291+	(40+)
Medal record
Cerezo Osaka
Runner-up	Emperor's Cup	2003
- * Club domestic league appearances and goals

Takaaki Tokushige (徳重 隆明, Tokushige Takaaki; born February 18, 1975) is a former Japanese football player.

== Playing career ==
Tokushige was born in Satsumasendai on February 18, 1975. After graduating from high school, he joined Regional Leagues club Nippon Denso (later Denso) in 1993. The club was promoted to Japan Football League from 1996. He played many matches every season. In 2001, he scored 25 goals in 28 matches and became a top scorer in Japan Football League. In 2002, he moved to newly was relegated to J2 League club, Cerezo Osaka. Cerezo was promoted to J1 League end of 2002 season. He played many matches as forward and midfielder every season. However Cerezo was relegated to J2 end of 2006 season. In 2007, he moved to newly was relegated to J2 League club, Kyoto Sanga FC. He played as regular left midfielder and Sanga was promoted to J1 end of 2007 season. However his opportunity to play decreased in 2008. In 2009, he moved to J2 club Tokushima Vortis. He played as regular player in 2009. Although his opportunity to play decreased from 2010, he played many matches every seasons. In 2013, he moved to Regional Leagues club Nagoya SC. He retired end of 2014 season.

== Club statistics ==
Club performance			League		Cup		League Cup		Total	
Season	Club	League	Apps	Goals	Apps	Goals	Apps	Goals	Apps	Goals
Japan			League		Emperor's Cup		J.League Cup		Total	
1996	Denso	Football League	26	9	1	1	-		27	10
1997	Denso	Football League	25	1	1	0	-		26	1
1998	Denso	Football League	28	10	2	0	-		30	10
1999	Denso	Football League	23	7	3	6	-		26	13
2000	Denso	Football League	22	11	3	3	-		31	14
2001	Denso	Football League	28	25	2	0	-		30	25
2002	Cerezo Osaka	J2 League	20	1	2	0	-		22	1
2003	Cerezo Osaka	J1 League	22	7	5	1	2	1	29	9
2004	Cerezo Osaka	J1 League	24	3	1	0	5	0	30	3
2005	Cerezo Osaka	J1 League	17	0	1	0	0	0	18	0
2006	Cerezo Osaka	J1 League	19	1	0	0	6	1	25	2
2007	Kyoto Sanga FC	J2 League	45	8	0	0	-		45	8
2008	Kyoto Sanga FC	J1 League	15	0	0	0	4	1	19	1
2009	Tokushima Vortis	J2 League	50	12	1	0	-		51	12
2010	Tokushima Vortis	J2 League	31	4	2	0	-		33	4
2011	Tokushima Vortis	J2 League	28	3	1	0	-		29	3
2012	Tokushima Vortis	J2 League	20	1	1	0	-		21	1
Total			443	103	26	11	17	3	486	117
