= Yasuhito Endō =

Japanese footballer (born 1980)

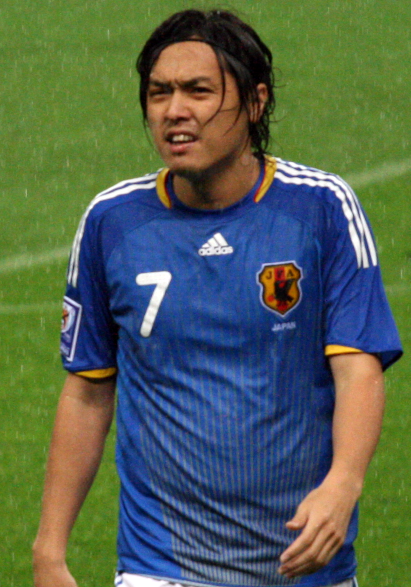
- Endō playing for Japan in 2008

Personal information
- Full name: Yasuhito Endo
- Date of birth: 28 January 1980 (age 46)
- Place of birth: Kagoshima, Japan
- Height: 1.78 m (5 ft 10 in)
- Position: Midfielder

Team information
- Current team: Gamba Osaka (assistant manager)

Youth career
- 1995–1997: Kagoshima Jitsugyo High School

Senior career*
Years	Team	Apps	(Gls)
1998–1999	Yokohama Flügels	16	(1)
1999–2001	Kyoto Purple Sanga	53	(9)
2001–2021	Gamba Osaka	605	(98)
2020–2021	→ Júbilo Iwata (loan)	50	(5)
2022–2023	Júbilo Iwata	51	(0)
Total		775	(113)

International career
1998–1999	Japan U20	11	(1)
1999	Japan U23	7	(0)
2002–2015	Japan	152	(15)

Managerial career
- 2024–: Gamba Osaka (assistant)
Medal record
Representing Japan
AFC Asian Cup
Winner	2004 China
Winner	2011 Qatar
FIFA U-20 World Cup
Runner-up	1999 Nigeria
AFC U-19 Championship
Runner-up	1998 Thailand
- * Club domestic league appearances and goals

Yasuhito Endō (遠藤 保仁, Endō Yasuhito; born 28 January 1980) is a Japanese former footballer who played as a midfielder. He is currently the assistant manager of J1 League club, Gamba Osaka.

Endō's playing career unfolded entirely within Japan, where he was associated with Gamba Osaka for 20 years. He made his senior international debut in 2002, representing Japan in three FIFA World Cup and three FIFA Confederations Cup. In the process he earned over 150 caps, scoring 15 goals and becoming the most capped Japanese male player of all time. In addition, he is one of the few players to have made over 1,100 official appearances and holds the record for the highest number of J.League appearances in history, with 672 appearances.

His brother Akihiro Endō is also a former footballer. However, neither of them are related to Wataru Endo.

== Club career ==
=== Yokohama Flügels ===
Endō was born in Kagoshima on 28 January 1980. After graduating from Kagoshima Jitsugyo High School, he joined J1 League club Yokohama Flügels in 1998. In March, he debuted against Yokohama Marinos in the opening game of the 1998 season. Largely as a central midfielder, he helped his club win the championship in the 1998 Emperor's Cup. Due to financial strain, the club was disbanded at the end of the season and merged with Yokohama Marinos.

=== Kyoto Purple Sanga ===
In 1999, Endō moved to Kyoto Purple Sanga with contemporaries Kazuki Teshima and Hideo Oshima. He became a regular player and played many matches. However the club was relegated to the J2 League at the end of the 2000 season.

=== Gamba Osaka ===
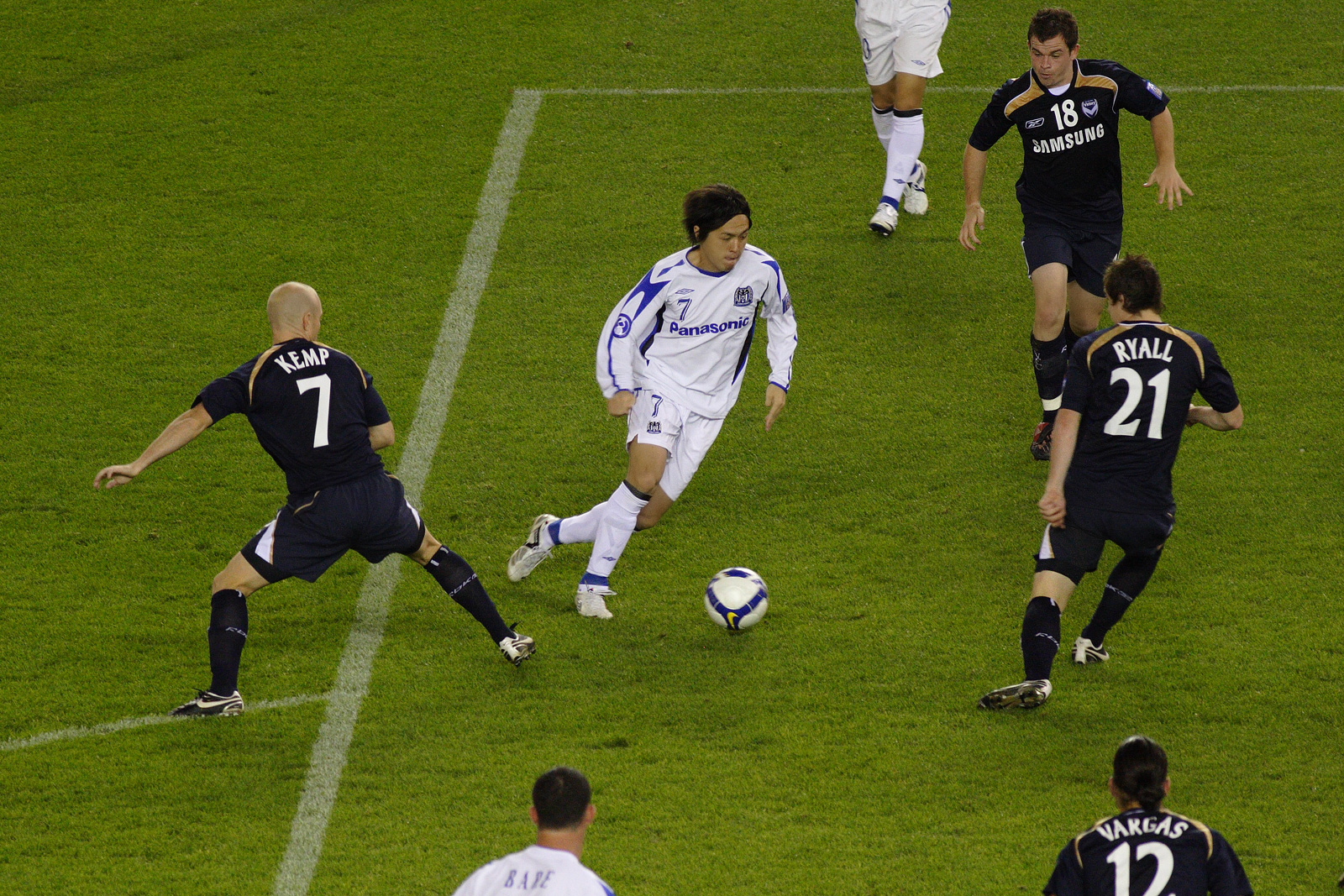
Endō in action for Gamba Osaka in an AFC Champions League match against Melbourne Victory in 2008

In 2001, Endō moved to J1 club Gamba Osaka. He was a central player for the club for a long time under manager Akira Nishino (2002–2011). He was selected as a J.League Best Eleven 10 years in a row (2003–2012). In 2005, Gamba won the championship in the J1 League for the first time in the club's history. In 2008, Gamba won the championship in the AFC Champions League for 2 years in a row as a Japanese club (Urawa Reds won it in 2007). Gamba also won the Emperor's Cup. Endō was selected as the "Japanese Footballer of the Year". In 2009, Gamba won the Emperor's Cup for 2 years in a row. Endō was selected as the Asian Footballer of the Year.

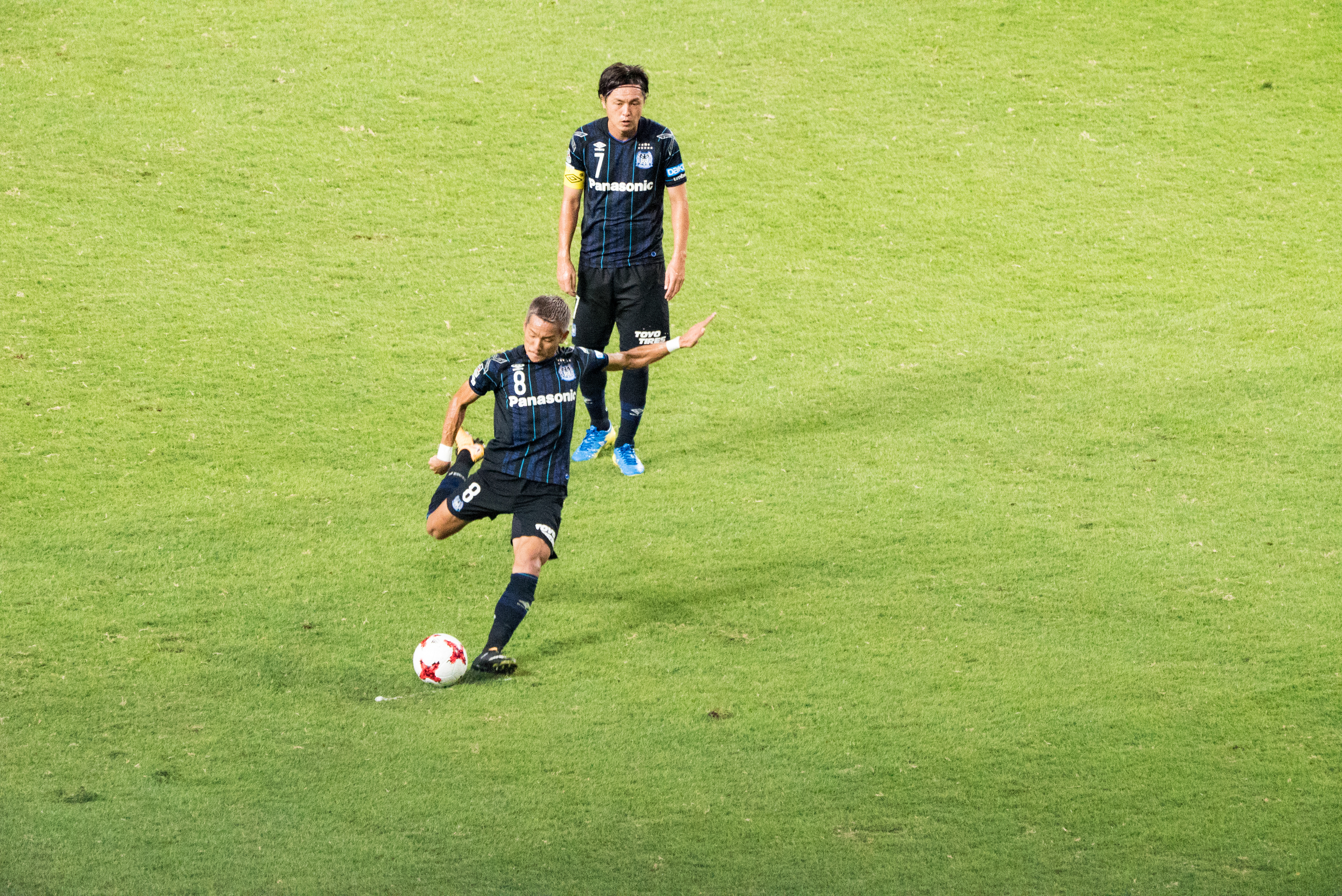
Endō (rear) looking on as Yosuke Ideguchi takes a free kick against Vissel Kobe in 2017

Manager Nishino left Gamba after the 2011 season and the club's performance deteriorated. In 2012, Gamba finished at the 17th place of 18 clubs and was relegated to the J2 League. Endō remained with Gamba and Gamba won the championship in the 2013 season. In the 2014 season, Gamba returned to J1 and won all three major titles in Japan, J1 League, J.League Cup and Emperor's Cup. Endō was selected as the J.League MVP and "Japanese Footballer of the Year" for the second time.

=== Júbilo Iwata ===
In October 2020, he joined J2 League side Júbilo Iwata on loan from Gamba Osaka. In December 2021, he joined Júbilo Iwata on a full transfer. In May 2023, Endō was named MVP of J.League's first 30 years.

On 9 January 2024, Endō announced his retirement from professional football, having played in a record of 672 J.League matches.

== International career ==
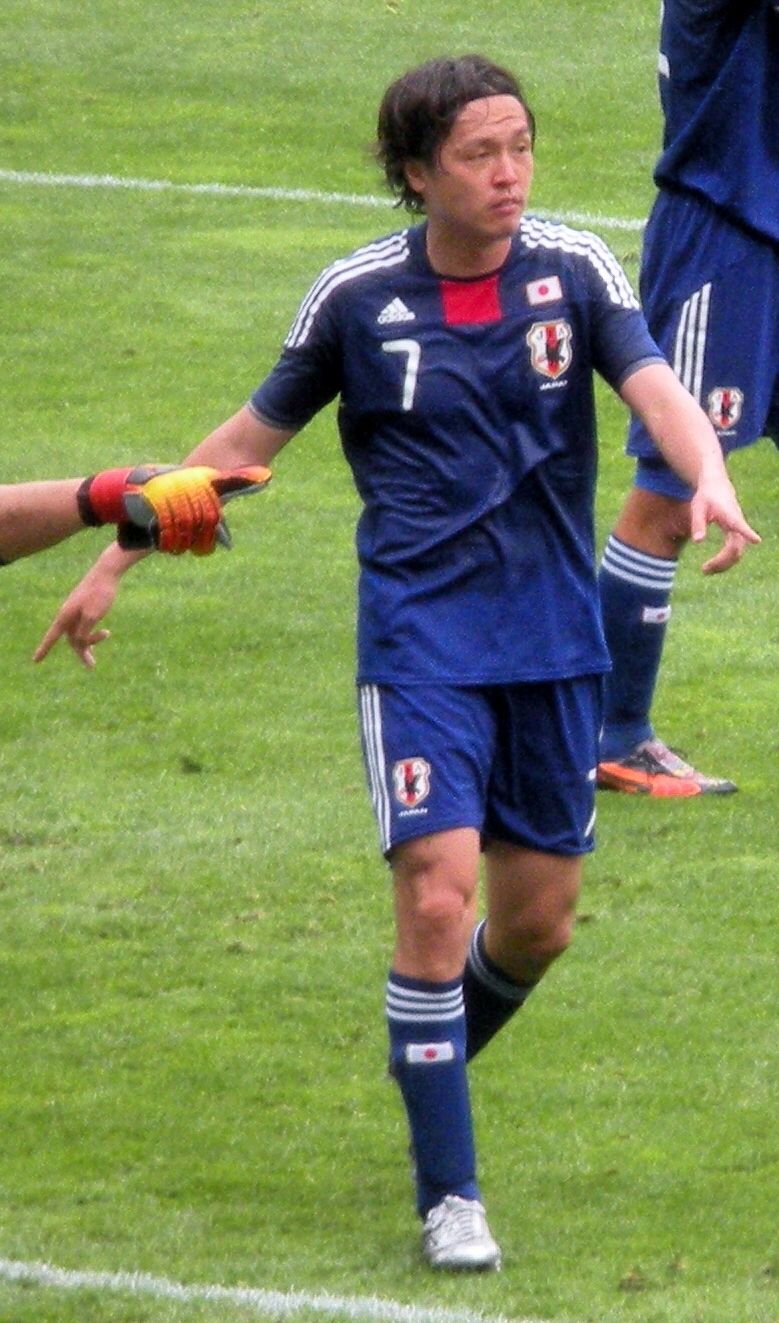
Endō playing for Japan at the 2010 FIFA World Cup

Endō played in the 1999 World Youth Championship and Japan finished as runner-up, losing to Spain in the final. Since 2002, Endō had been a member of the Japan national team, and was selected for Japan's 2006, 2010 and 2014 World Cup squads. He was also a member of the 2004 and 2011 Asian Cup winning teams.

On 24 June 2010, Endō scored from a free kick against Denmark in a 3–1 win as Japan qualified for the second round of the World Cup.

On 12 October 2010, he became the fourth player to earn a 100th full international cap for Japan in a friendly match against South Korea. On 16 October 2012, Endō became Japan's most capped player in a friendly match against Brazil. His start in this match was his 123rd appearance for the national team, surpassing Masami Ihara's previous record of 122 caps.

Endō was included in Japan's squad for the 2015 Asian Cup and scored the team's opening goal of the tournament in a 4–0 victory against Palestine. In the team's next match, he earned his 150th cap as Japan defeated Iraq 1–0. He played 152 games and scored 15 goals for Japan until 2015.

== Style of play ==
He is considered a cult hero among fans of Gamba Osaka and the Japan national team, attributed to his longevity as a professional athlete, technical ability, leadership, and goal scoring ability. He is also known for his accuracy on free kicks.

== Career statistics ==
=== Club ===
Appearances and goals by club, season and competition
Club	Season	League		Emperor's Cup		J.League Cup		AFC		Other (Note: Includes Japanese Super Cup, A3 Champions Cup and FIFA Club World Cup and J. League Championship and 2015 Suruga Bank Championship)		Total	
Club	Season	Apps	Goals	Apps	Goals	Apps	Goals	Apps	Goals	Apps	Goals	Apps	Goals
Kagoshima Jitsugyo HS	1997	—		1	0	—		—		—		1	0
Yokohama Flügels	1998	16	1	0	0	4	0	—		—		20	1
Kyoto Purple Sanga	1999	24	4	1	0	2	0	—		—		27	4
Kyoto Purple Sanga	2000	29	5	0	0	6	1	—		—		35	6
Kyoto Purple Sanga	Total	53	9	1	0	8	1	—		—		62	10
Gamba Osaka	2001	29	4	3	1	4	0	—		—		36	5
Gamba Osaka	2002	30	5	1	0	8	1	—		—		39	6
Gamba Osaka	2003	30	4	2	0	6	0	—		—		38	4
Gamba Osaka	2004	29	9	3	0	0	0	—		—		32	9
Gamba Osaka	2005	33	10	2	0	4	0	—		—		39	10
Gamba Osaka	2006	25	9	4	1	0	0	5	3	4	1	38	14
Gamba Osaka	2007	34	8	4	0	8	1	—		1	0	47	9
Gamba Osaka	2008	27	6	3	0	1	0	10	3	3	2	44	11
Gamba Osaka	2009	32	10	4	3	2	0	6	1	1	0	45	14
Gamba Osaka	2010	30	3	2	2	0	0	3	0	1	0	36	5
Gamba Osaka	2011	33	4	0	0	0	0	7	1	—		40	5
Gamba Osaka	2012	34	5	4	3	2	0	4	1	—		44	9
Gamba Osaka	2013	33	5	0	0	—		—		—		33	5
Gamba Osaka	2014	34	6	5	0	6	0	—		—		45	6
Gamba Osaka	2015	34	5	4	0	3	1	12	0	5	0	58	6
Gamba Osaka	2016	34	2	2	0	3	1	5	1	1	0	45	4
Gamba Osaka	2017	31	1	1	0	4	0	7	0	—		43	1
Gamba Osaka	2018	34	1	1	0	6	0	—		—		41	1
Gamba Osaka	2019	28	1	1	0	5	0	—		—		34	1
Gamba Osaka	2020	11	0	0	0	2	0	—		—		13	0
Gamba Osaka	Total	605	98	46	10	64	4	59	10	16	3	790	125
Júbilo Iwata (loan)	2020	15	2	—		—		—		—		15	2
Júbilo Iwata (loan)	2021	35	3	—		—		—		—		35	3
Júbilo Iwata (loan)	Total	50	5	0	0	0	0	0	0	0	0	50	5
Júbilo Iwata	2022	31	0	—		1	0	—		—		32	0
Júbilo Iwata	2023	20	0	2	0	1	0	—		—		23	0
Career total		775	113	50	10	78	5	59	10	16	3	978	141

=== International ===
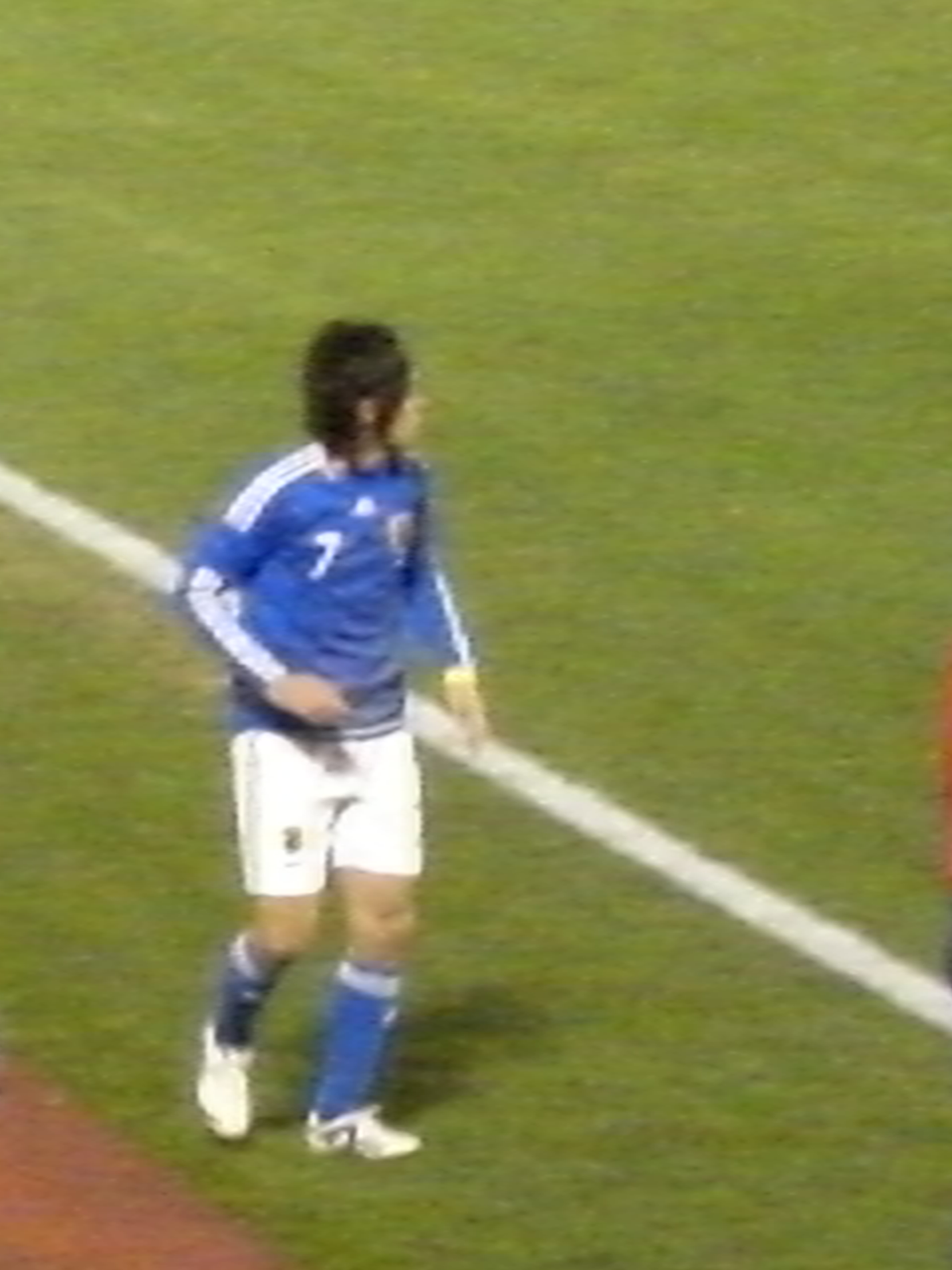
Endō playing for Japan in 2008

Appearances and goals by national team and year
National team	Year	Apps	Goals
Japan	2002	1	0
Japan	2003	11	1
Japan	2004	16	2
Japan	2005	8	0
Japan	2006	8	0
Japan	2007	13	1
Japan	2008	16	3
Japan	2009	12	0
Japan	2010	15	2
Japan	2011	13	0
Japan	2012	11	1
Japan	2013	16	2
Japan	2014	8	2
Japan	2015	4	1
Total		152	15

Scores and results list Japan's goal tally first, score column indicates score after each Endō goal.

List of international goals scored by Yasuhito Endō
No.	Date	Venue	Opponent	Score	Result	Competition	Ref.
1	20 August 2003	National Olympic Stadium, Tokyo, Japan	Nigeria	3–0	3–0	Friendly	
2	7 February 2004	Kashima Stadium, Kashima, Japan	Malaysia	4–0	4–0	Friendly	
3	7 July 2004	International Stadium Yokohama, Yokohama, Japan	Serbia and Montenegro	1–0	1–0	Friendly	
4	16 July 2007	Mỹ Đình National Stadium, Hanoi, Vietnam	Vietnam	2–1	4–1	2007 AFC Asian Cup	
5	6 February 2008	Saitama Stadium, Saitama, Japan	Thailand	1–0	4–1	2010 FIFA World Cup Qualification	
6	7 June 2008	Royal Oman Police Stadium, Muscat, Oman	Oman	1–1	1–1	2010 FIFA World Cup Qualification	
7	6 September 2008	Bahrain National Stadium, Riffa, Bahrain	Bahrain	2–0	3–2	2010 FIFA World Cup Qualification	
8	14 February 2010	National Olympic Stadium, Tokyo, Japan	South Korea	1–0	1–3	2010 East Asian Football Championship	
9	24 June 2010	Royal Bafokeng Stadium, Rustenburg, South Africa	Denmark	2–0	3–1	2010 FIFA World Cup	
10	15 August 2012	Sapporo Dome, Sapporo, Japan	Venezuela	1–0	1–1	Friendly	
11	6 September 2013	Nagai Stadium, Osaka, Japan	Guatemala	3–0	3–0	Friendly	
12	10 September 2013	International Stadium Yokohama, Yokohama, Japan	Ghana	2–1	3–1	Friendly	
13	2 June 2014	Raymond James Stadium, Tampa, United States	Costa Rica	1–1	3–1	Friendly	
14	14 November 2014	Toyota Stadium, Toyota, Japan	Honduras	3–0	6–0	Friendly	
15	12 January 2015	Newcastle Stadium, Newcastle, Australia	Palestine	1–0	4–0	2015 AFC Asian Cup	

== Honours ==
Yokohama Flügels

- Emperor's Cup: 1998

Gamba Osaka

- J1 League: 2005, 2014
- J2 League: 2013
- Emperor's Cup: 2008, 2009, 2014, 2015
- J.League Cup: 2007, 2014
- Japanese Super Cup: 2007, 2015
- AFC Champions League: 2008
- Pan-Pacific Championship: 2008
- FIFA Club World Cup: 2008 Bronze Medalist.

Júbilo Iwata

- J2 League: 2021

Japan

- AFC Asian Cup: 2004, 2011
- Afro-Asian Cup of Nations: 2007
- Kirin Cup: 2004, 2007, 2008, 2009

Individual

- Asian Footballer of the Year: 2009
- AFC Champions League Best Player: 2008
- J.League MVP Award: 2014
- Japanese Footballer of the Year: 2008, 2014
- J.League Best Eleven: 2003, 2004, 2005, 2006, 2007, 2008, 2009, 2010, 2011, 2012, 2014, 2015
- J.League 20th Anniversary Team
- J.League 30th Anniversary Team
- MVP of the J-League's first 30 years

== See also ==
- List of men's footballers with 100 or more international caps
- List of men's footballers with the most official appearances
