= 2006 Gamba Osaka season =

Gamba Osaka
2006 season
- Manager: Akira Nishino
- Stadium: Osaka Expo '70 Stadium
- J. League 1: 3rd
- Emperor's Cup: Runners-up
- J. League Cup: Quarterfinals
- Top goalscorer: Magno Alves (26)

2006 Gamba Osaka season

== Competitions ==
Competitions	Position
J. League 1	3rd / 18 clubs
Emperor's Cup	Runners-up
J. League Cup	Quarterfinals

== Domestic results ==
=== J. League 1 ===
Match	Date	Venue	Opponents	Score
1	2006..			-
2	2006..			-
3	2006..			-
4	2006..			-
5	2006..			-
6	2006..			-
7	2006..			-
8	2006..			-
9	2006..			-
10	2006..			-
11	2006..			-
12	2006..			-
13	2006..			-
14	2006..			-
15	2006..			-
16	2006..			-
17	2006..			-
18	2006..			-
19	2006..			-
20	2006..			-
21	2006..			-
22	2006..			-
23	2006..			-
24	2006..			-
25	2006..			-
26	2006..			-
27	2006..			-
28	2006..			-
29	2006..			-
30	2006..			-
31	2006..			-
32	2006..			-
33	2006..			-
34	2006..			-

=== Emperor's Cup ===
Match	Date	Venue	Opponents	Score
4th Round	2006..			-
5th Round	2006..			-
Quarterfinals	2006..			-
Semifinals	2006..			-
Final	2006..			-

=== J. League Cup ===
Match	Date	Venue	Opponents	Score
Quarterfinals-1	2006..			-
Quarterfinals-2	2006..			-

== Player statistics ==
No.	Pos.	Player	D.o.B. (Age)	Height / Weight	J. League 1		Emperor's Cup		J. League Cup		Total	
No.	Pos.	Player	D.o.B. (Age)	Height / Weight	Apps	Goals	Apps	Goals	Apps	Goals	Apps	Goals
1	GK	Naoki Matsuyo	April 9, 1974 (aged 31)	cm / kg	8	0						
2	DF	Sidiclei	May 13, 1972 (aged 33)	cm / kg	31	3						
3	DF	Toru Irie	July 8, 1977 (aged 28)	cm / kg	6	0						
4	DF	Noritada Saneyoshi	October 19, 1972 (aged 33)	cm / kg	4	0						
5	DF	Tsuneyasu Miyamoto	February 7, 1977 (aged 29)	cm / kg	30	1						
6	DF	Satoshi Yamaguchi	April 17, 1978 (aged 27)	cm / kg	32	6						
7	MF	Yasuhito Endō	January 28, 1980 (aged 26)	cm / kg	25	9						
8	MF	Fernandinho	January 13, 1981 (aged 25)	cm / kg	19	6						
9	FW	Magno Alves	January 13, 1976 (aged 30)	cm / kg	31	26						
10	MF	Takahiro Futagawa	June 27, 1980 (aged 25)	cm / kg	33	6						
11	FW	Ryūji Bando	August 2, 1979 (aged 26)	cm / kg	30	16						
13	DF	Kazuki Teshima	June 7, 1979 (aged 26)	cm / kg	0	0						
14	MF	Akihiro Ienaga	June 13, 1986 (aged 19)	cm / kg	28	2						
15	DF	Ryota Aoki	August 19, 1984 (aged 21)	cm / kg	6	0						
16	MF	Masafumi Maeda	January 25, 1983 (aged 23)	cm / kg	27	2						
17	MF	Tomokazu Myojin	January 24, 1978 (aged 28)	cm / kg	25	0						
18	FW	Ryota Miki	April 12, 1985 (aged 20)	cm / kg	0	0						
19	FW	Satoshi Nakayama	November 7, 1981 (aged 24)	cm / kg	22	2						
20	MF	Shinichi Terada	June 10, 1985 (aged 20)	cm / kg	20	0						
21	DF	Akira Kaji	January 13, 1980 (aged 26)	cm / kg	29	1						
22	GK	Yosuke Fujigaya	February 13, 1981 (aged 25)	cm / kg	26	0						
23	GK	Suguru Hino	July 29, 1982 (aged 23)	cm / kg	0	0						
24	MF	Toshihiro Matsushita	October 17, 1983 (aged 22)	cm / kg	1	0						
25	DF	Daiki Niwa	January 16, 1986 (aged 20)	cm / kg	0	0						
26	DF	Hirotada Ito	December 5, 1987 (aged 18)	cm / kg	0	0						
27	MF	Hideo Hashimoto	May 21, 1979 (aged 26)	cm / kg	28	0						
28	DF	Ryujiro Ueda	January 29, 1988 (aged 18)	cm / kg	0	0						
29	MF	Yasunobu Matsuoka	May 2, 1986 (aged 19)	cm / kg	0	0						
30	MF	Shigeru Yokotani	May 3, 1987 (aged 18)	cm / kg	0	0						
31	GK	Atsushi Kimura	May 1, 1984 (aged 21)	cm / kg	0	0						
32	FW	Hideya Okamoto	May 18, 1987 (aged 18)	cm / kg	0	0						
33	DF	Michihiro Yasuda	December 20, 1987 (aged 18)	cm / kg	2	0						
34	FW	Shoki Hirai	December 4, 1987 (aged 18)	cm / kg	0	0						
35	MF	Lucas	September 22, 1987 (aged 18)	cm / kg	0	0						

== Other pages ==
- (in Japanese) J. League official site
