= Toshiaki Haji =

Japanese footballer (born 1978)

Toshiaki Haji 羽地 登志晃
Personal information
- Full name: Toshiaki Haji
- Date of birth: August 28, 1978 (age 48)
- Place of birth: Sakai, Japan
- Height: 1.85 m (6 ft 1 in)
- Position: Forward

Youth career
- 1994–1996: Senboku High School
- 1997–2000: Tenri University

Senior career*
Years	Team	Apps	(Gls)
2000–2002	Cerezo Osaka	1	(0)
2002	Sagawa Express Osaka	6	(4)
2003	Montedio Yamagata	28	(6)
2004	JEF United Ichihara	0	(0)
2004	Kashiwa Reysol	8	(1)
2005–2007	Tokushima Vortis	112	(27)
2007–2008	Ventforet Kofu	34	(5)
2009–2010	Tokushima Vortis	59	(12)
Total		248	(55)
Medal record
Cerezo Osaka
Runner-up	Emperor's Cup	2001
- * Club domestic league appearances and goals

Toshiaki Haji (羽地 登志晃, Haji Toshiaki; born August 28, 1978) is a former Japanese football player.

== Playing career ==
Haji was born in Sakai on August 28, 1978. In November 2000, when he was a Tenri University student, he joined J1 League club Cerezo Osaka. On November 18, he debuted as substitute forward from the 78th minute against Yokohama F. Marinos. However he could only play this match until 2002. The club was also relegated to J2 League from 2002. In September 2002, he moved to Japan Football League club Sagawa Express Osaka. He played in 6 matches and scored 4 goals. In 2003, he moved to J2 club Montedio Yamagata. He played many matches as substitute forward. In 2004, he moved to J1 club JEF United Ichihara. However he could not play at all in the match. In September 2004, he moved to Kashiwa Reysol and played many matches. In 2005, he moved to newly was promoted to J2 League club, Tokushima Vortis. He became a regular player as forward and scored many goals. In July 2007, he moved to J1 club Ventforet Kofu. However he could not play many matches and the club was relegated to J2 from 2008. In 2008, he played many matches as substitute forward. In 2009, he moved to Tokushima Vortis. He played all 51 matches and scored 12 goals in 2009. However he could not play many matches in 2010 and retired end of 2010 season.

== Club statistics ==
Club performance			League		Cup		League Cup		Total	
Season	Club	League	Apps	Goals	Apps	Goals	Apps	Goals	Apps	Goals
Japan			League		Emperor's Cup		J.League Cup		Total	
2000	Cerezo Osaka	J1 League	1	0	0	0	0	0	1	0
2001	Cerezo Osaka	J1 League	0	0	0	0	0	0	0	0
2002	Cerezo Osaka	J2 League	0	0	0	0	-		0	0
2002	Sagawa Express Osaka	Football League	6	4	1	1	-		7	5
2003	Montedio Yamagata	J2 League	28	6	2	0	-		30	6
2004	JEF United Ichihara	J1 League	0	0	0	0	0	0	0	0
2004	Kashiwa Reysol	J1 League	8	1	0	0	0	0	8	1
2005	Tokushima Vortis	J2 League	42	12	1	0	-		43	12
2006	Tokushima Vortis	J2 League	46	9	2	1	-		48	10
2007	Tokushima Vortis	J2 League	24	6	0	0	-		24	6
2007	Ventforet Kofu	J1 League	6	0	2	1	0	0	8	1
2008	Ventforet Kofu	J2 League	28	5	0	0	-		28	5
2009	Tokushima Vortis	J2 League	51	12	1	0	-		52	12
2010	Tokushima Vortis	J2 League	8	0	1	0	-		9	0
Total			248	55	10	3	0	0	258	58
