= Takashi Usami =

Japanese professional footballer

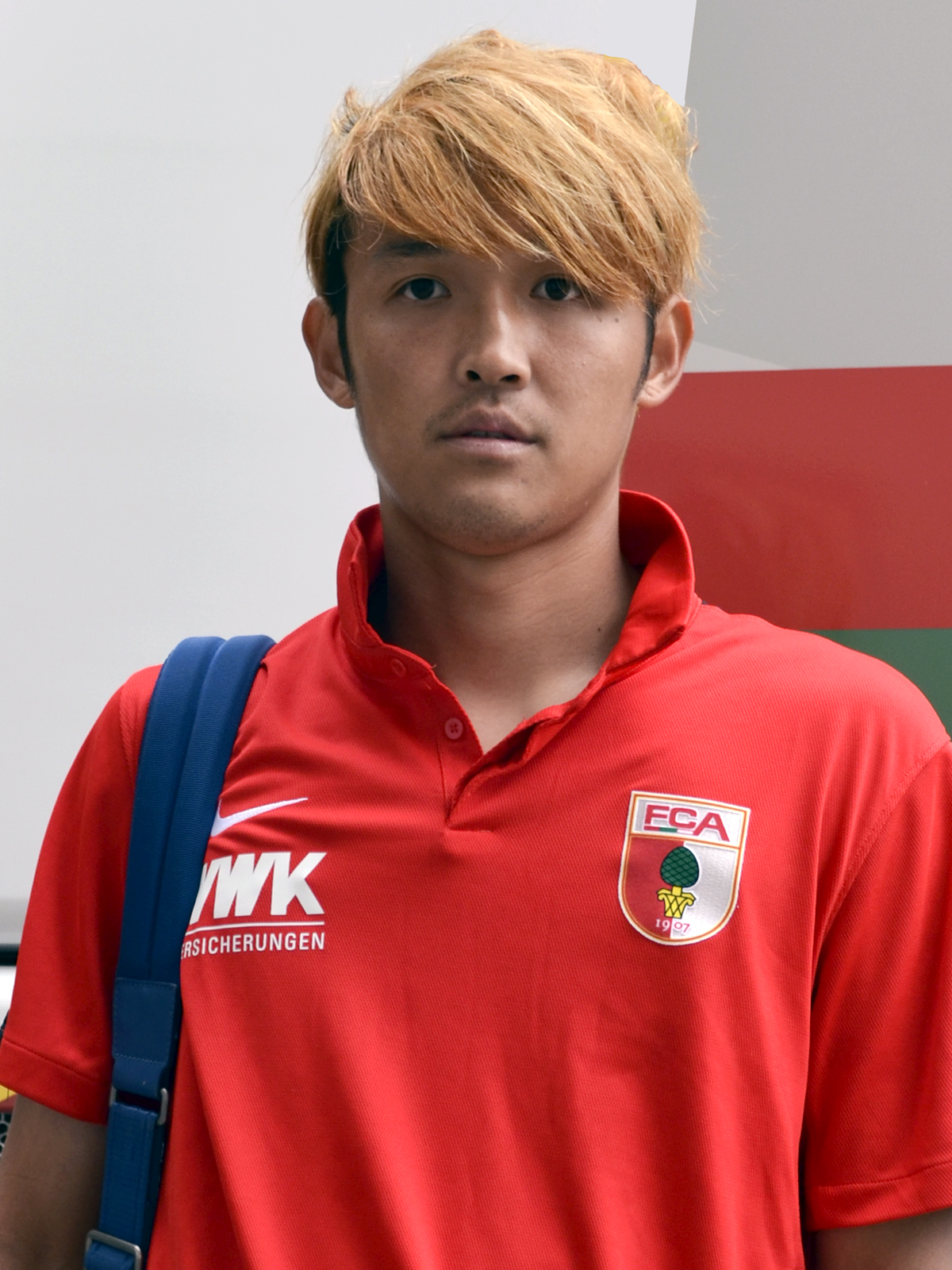
- Usami With FC Augsburg

Personal information
- Date of birth: 6 May 1992 (age 34)
- Place of birth: Nagaokakyō, Kyoto, Japan
- Height: 1.78 m (5 ft 10 in)
- Positions: Forward; winger

Team information
- Current team: Gamba Osaka
- Number: 7

Youth career
- 1999–2004: Nagaokakyō SS
- 2005–2008: Gamba Osaka

Senior career*
Years	Team	Apps	(Gls)
2009–2016	Gamba Osaka	138	(64)
2011–2012	→ Bayern Munich (loan)	3	(0)
2011–2012	→ Bayern Munich II (loan)	18	(6)
2012–2013	→ 1899 Hoffenheim (loan)	20	(2)
2016–2019	FC Augsburg	11	(0)
2017–2019	→ Fortuna Düsseldorf (loan)	47	(9)
2019–	Gamba Osaka	191	(44)

International career^{‡}
2007	Japan U15	4	(2)
2007–2008	Japan U16	7	(5)
2009	Japan U17	5	(3)
2010	Japan U19	13	(5)
2011–2015	Japan U23	12	(2)
2015–2019	Japan	27	(3)
Medal record
Gamba Osaka
Winner	J1 League	2014
Runner-up	J1 League	2010
Runner-up	J1 League	2015
Winner	J.League Cup	2014
Runner-up	J.League Cup	2015
Runner-up	J.League Cup	2016
Winner	Emperor's Cup	2009
Winner	Emperor's Cup	2014
Winner	Emperor's Cup	2015
- * Club domestic league appearances and goals as of 9 August 2026 ‡ National team caps and goals as of 24 June 2019

Takashi Usami (宇佐美 貴史, Usami Takashi; born 6 May 1992) is a Japanese professional footballer who plays for Gamba Osaka in the J1 League. He plays as a forward or a winger.

== Club career ==
=== Gamba Osaka ===
Usami made club history by making his professional debut for Gamba Osaka at the age of 17 years and 14 days and scoring a goal in the same match to become the youngest player to achieve both feats for the club, breaking the records previously set by Junichi Inamoto. Usami made his professional debut and goal on 20 May 2009 against FC Seoul in the Champions League. He finished the 2009 season with a goal in four matches played, which includes three league matches, and a Champions League match. In 2010, he became a more regular face in the Gamba Osaka team and he was named as Best Young Player by the J. League at the annual awards ceremony on 6 December.

=== Bayern Munich ===
In June 2011, it was confirmed that Usami would be loaned out to Bayern Munich, with an option to buy next summer. He joined the club in mid-July. Usami told the media in a news conference that a chance like that did not come every day, and that he was looking forward to this big challenge. When he was asked about Bayern's current first-team players, he said: "I want to improve my skills to the point, where I can take their places." Usami scored his first competitive goal for the Bavarians on 26 October 2011, in a DFB Cup match against FC Ingolstadt, after coming off the bench in the 73rd minute.

=== 1899 Hoffenheim ===
Usami scored two goals in 21 matches played for 1899 Hoffenheim.

=== FC Augsburg ===
==== 2016–17 season ====
Usami joined Augsburg in the summer of 2016. He played in 11 matches during the 2016–17 season.

==== Loan to Fortuna Düsseldorf ====
Usami was loaned to Fortuna Düsseldorf for the 2017–18 season. He played a key role in helping them gain promotion to the Bundesliga. He finished the 2017–18 season with eight goals in 28 matches played.

==== 2018–19 season ====
Usami returned to Augsburg for the 2018–19 season.

==== Second loan to Fortuna Düsseldorf ====
On 4 August 2018, Usami rejoined Fortuna Düsseldorf on a season-long loan for the 2018–19 season.

== International career ==
In October 2009, Usami was elected Japan U17 national team for 2009 FIFA U-17 World Cup. He played all three matches. In July 2012, he was elected Japan U23 national team for 2012 Summer Olympics. He played four matches and Japan won the fourth place.

Usami debuted for Japan in a friendly match against Tunisia on 27 March 2015. He scored his debut goal in a friendly match against Uzbekistan on 31 March 2015. In May 2018 he was named in Japan's preliminary squad for the 2018 FIFA World Cup in Russia.

== Career statistics ==
=== Club ===
As of matches played on 1 July 2023

Appearances and goals by club, season and competition
Club	Season	League			National cup (Note: National Cup)		League cup (Note: League Cup)		Continental		Other		Total		Ref.
Club	Season	Division	Apps	Goals	Apps	Goals	Apps	Goals	Apps	Goals	Apps	Goals	Apps	Goals	Ref.
Gamba Osaka	2009	J. League Division 1	3	0	0	0	0	0	1 (Note: AFC Champions League)	1	—		4	1	
Gamba Osaka	2010	J. League Division 1	26	7	4	2	2	0	4 (Note: AFC Champions League)	2	1 (Note: Japanese Super Cup)	0	37	10	
Gamba Osaka	2011	J. League Division 1	14	4	0	0	0	0	7 (Note: AFC Champions League)	1	—		21	5	
Gamba Osaka	2013	J. League Division 2	18	19	2	1	0	0	—		—		20	20	
Gamba Osaka	2014	J. League Division 1	26	10	4	6	7	5	—		—		37	21	
Gamba Osaka	2015	J1 League	34	19	3	4	1	0	11 (Note: AFC Champions League)	4	4 (Note: Japanese Super Cup and J League playoffs)	1	53	28	
Gamba Osaka	2016	J1 League	17	5	0	0	0	0	5 (Note: AFC Champions League)	0	1 (Note: Japanese Super Cup)	1	23	6	
Gamba Osaka	Total		138	64	13	13	10	5	28	8	6	2	195	92	—
Bayern Munich II (loan)	2011–12	Regionalliga Süd	18	6	—		—		—		—		18	6	
Bayern Munich (loan)	2011–12	Bundesliga	3	0	1	1	—		1 (Note: UEFA Champions League)	0	—		5	1	
1899 Hoffenheim (loan)	2012–13	Bundesliga	20	2	1	0	—		—		—		21	2	
FC Augsburg	2016–17	Bundesliga	11	0	0	0	—		—		—		11	0	
Fortuna Düsseldorf (loan)	2017–18	2. Bundesliga	28	8	1	0	—		—		—		29	8	
Fortuna Düsseldorf	2018–19	Bundesliga	19	1	2	0	—		—		—		21	1	
Gamba Osaka	2019	J1 League	14	7	1	0	4	1	—		—		19	8	
Gamba Osaka	2020	J1 League	30	6	2	0	2	0	—		—		34	6	
Gamba Osaka	2021	J1 League	38	6	4	0	2	0	5	0	—		49	6	
Gamba Osaka	2022	J1 League	7	0	0	0	1	0	—		—		8	0	
Gamba Osaka	2023	J1 League	14	3	0	0	4	0	—		—		18	3	
Gamba Osaka	Total		103	22	7	0	15	1	5	0	0	0	128	23	—
Career total			340	103	25	14	23	6	34	8	6	2	428	133	—

=== International ===
As of 26 March 2019

Appearances and goals by national team and year
National team	Year	Apps	Goals
Japan	2015	13	2
Japan	2016	5	1
Japan	2017	1	0
Japan	2018	7	0
Japan	2019	1	0
Total		27	3

As of match played 3 June 2016
Scores and results list Japan's goal tally first, score column indicates score after each Usami goal.

List of international goals scored by Takashi Usami
No.	Date	Venue	Cap	Opponent	Score	Result	Competition
1	31 March 2015	Ajinomoto Stadium, Chōfu, Japan	2	Uzbekistan	4–1	5–1	Friendly
2	8 October 2015	Al-Seeb Stadium, Muscat, Oman	10	Syria	3–0	3–0	2018 FIFA World Cup qualification
3	3 June 2016	Toyota Stadium, Toyota, Japan	15	Bulgaria	6–0	7–2	2016 Kirin Cup

== Honours ==
Gamba Osaka

- AFC Champions League Two: 2025–26
- J1 League: 2014
- J2 League: 2013
- Emperor's Cup: 2014, 2015
- J.League Cup: 2014
- Japanese Super Cup: 2015

Bayern Munich

- DFB-Pokal runner-up: 2011–12
- UEFA Champions League runner-up: 2011–12

Fortuna Düsseldorf

- 2. Bundesliga: 2017-18

Individual

- J.League Rookie of the Year: 2010
- J.League Cup New Hero Award: 2014
- J.League Best Eleven: 2014, 2015, 2024
- Emperor's Cup top scorer: 2014, 2015
