= Naoki Matsuyo =

Japanese footballer

Naoki Matsuyo 松代 直樹
Personal information
- Date of birth: April 9, 1974 (age 52)
- Place of birth: Nara, Japan
- Height: 1.81 m (5 ft 11 in)
- Position: Goalkeeper

Youth career
- 1990–1992: Kanmaki High School
- 1993–1996: Tenri University

Senior career*
Years	Team	Apps	(Gls)
1997–2009	Gamba Osaka	131	(0)
Total		131	(0)
Medal record
Gamba Osaka
Winner	AFC Champions League	2008
Winner	J1 League	2005
Winner	J.League Cup	2007
Runner-up	J.League Cup	2005
Winner	Emperor's Cup	2008
Winner	Emperor's Cup	2009
Runner-up	Emperor's Cup	2006
- * Club domestic league appearances and goals

Naoki Matsuyo (松代 直樹, Matsuyo Naoki; born April 9, 1974) is a former Japanese football player.

== Playing career ==
Matsuyo was born in Nara on April 9, 1974. After graduating from Tenri University, he joined J1 League club Gamba Osaka in 1997. However he could hardly play in the match behind Hayato Okanaka and Ryota Tsuzuki until early 2002. From August 2002, he became a regular goalkeeper instead Tsuzuki. However he got hurt in August 2005 and he lost regular position behind Yosuke Fujigaya who came to Gamba Osaka in this season. From 2005, although he battles with Fujigaya for the position, he could not become regular goalkeeper. The club won the champions 2005 J1 League, 2007 J.League Cup and 2008 Emperor's Cup. In Asia, the club also won the champions 2008 AFC Champions League first Asian champions in the club history. In 2009 Emperor's Cup, although he could not play in the match, the club won the qualify to final. At the final, he played the match because Fujigaya became influenza and the club won the champions. This match is his last match and he retired end of 2009 season.

== Club statistics ==
Club performance			League		Cup		League Cup		Continental		Total	
Season	Club	League	Apps	Goals	Apps	Goals	Apps	Goals	Apps	Goals	Apps	Goals
Japan			League		Emperor's Cup		J.League Cup		Asia		Total	
1997	Gamba Osaka	J1 League	0	0	0	0	0	0	-		0	0
1998	Gamba Osaka	J1 League	0	0	0	0	0	0	-		0	0
1999	Gamba Osaka	J1 League	0	0	0	0	0	0	-		0	0
2000	Gamba Osaka	J1 League	3	0	0	0	1	0	-		4	0
2001	Gamba Osaka	J1 League	1	0	0	0	0	0	-		1	0
2002	Gamba Osaka	J1 League	18	0	2	0	5	0	-		25	0
2003	Gamba Osaka	J1 League	30	0	2	0	4	0	-		36	0
2004	Gamba Osaka	J1 League	29	0	3	0	7	0	-		39	0
2005	Gamba Osaka	J1 League	14	0	1	0	4	0	-		19	0
2006	Gamba Osaka	J1 League	8	0	5	0	0	0	1	0	14	0
2007	Gamba Osaka	J1 League	6	0	0	0	4	0	-		10	0
2008	Gamba Osaka	J1 League	9	0	0	0	0	0	3	0	12	0
2009	Gamba Osaka	J1 League	13	0	1	0	0	0	5	0	19	0
Career total			131	0	14	0	25	0	9	0	179	0

== Honors ==
- 2008 AFC Champions League
- 2008 Pan-Pacific Championship
- 2005 J1 League
- 2009 Emperor's Cup
- 2007 J.League Cup
- 2007 Japanese Super Cup

== See also ==
- List of one-club men
