= Koji Kataoka =

Japanese footballer

Personal information
- Full name: Koji Kataoka
- Date of birth: June 19, 1977 (age 49)
- Place of birth: Miyako, Fukuoka, Japan
- Height: 1.70 m (5 ft 7 in)
- Position: Midfielder

Senior career*
| Years | Team | Apps | (Gls) |
| 1996–2009 | Tokushima Vortis | 301 | (40) |
| Total | | 301 | (40) |

International career
| 1999 | JFL XI | 4 | (2) |
- * Club domestic league appearances and goals

Koji Kataoka (片岡 功二, Kataoka Kōji; born June 19, 1977) is a former Japanese football player. He won the 1999 Bangabandhu Cup with the Japan Football League XI.

== Club statistics ==
| Club performance | | | League | | Cup | | Total | |
| Season | Club | League | Apps | Goals | Apps | Goals | Apps | Goals |
| Japan | | | League | | Emperor's Cup | | Total | |
|---|---|---|---|---|---|---|---|---|
| 1996 | Otsuka Pharmaceutical | Football League | 12 | 0 | 2 | 1 | 14 | 1 |
| 1997 | Otsuka Pharmaceutical | Football League | 23 | 3 | 0 | 0 | 23 | 3 |
| 1998 | Otsuka Pharmaceutical | Football League | 15 | 0 | 2 | 0 | 17 | 0 |
| 1999 | Otsuka Pharmaceutical | Football League | 17 | 6 | 2 | 3 | 19 | 9 |
| 2000 | Otsuka Pharmaceutical | Football League | 17 | 1 | 0 | 0 | 17 | 1 |
| 2001 | Otsuka Pharmaceutical | Football League | 25 | 6 | 3 | 0 | 28 | 6 |
| 2002 | Otsuka Pharmaceutical | Football League | 17 | 5 | 3 | 1 | 20 | 6 |
| 2003 | Otsuka Pharmaceutical | Football League | 27 | 2 | 2 | 1 | 29 | 3 |
| 2004 | Otsuka Pharmaceutical | Football League | 29 | 7 | 0 | 0 | 29 | 7 |
| 2005 | Tokushima Vortis | J2 League | 38 | 5 | 2 | 0 | 40 | 5 |
| 2006 | Tokushima Vortis | J2 League | 28 | 2 | 2 | 1 | 30 | 3 |
| 2007 | Tokushima Vortis | J2 League | 32 | 3 | 2 | 0 | 34 | 3 |
| 2008 | Tokushima Vortis | J2 League | 20 | 0 | 1 | 0 | 21 | 0 |
| 2009 | Tokushima Vortis | J2 League | 1 | 0 | 0 | 0 | 1 | 0 |
| Country | Japan | | 301 | 40 | 21 | 7 | 322 | 47 |
| Total | | | 301 | 40 | 21 | 7 | 322 | 47 |
