= Hideaki Ueno =

Japanese footballer

Hideaki Ueno 上野 秀章
Personal information
- Full name: Hideaki Ueno
- Date of birth: May 31, 1981 (age 45)
- Place of birth: Muroran, Hokkaido, Japan
- Height: 1.84 m (6 ft 1/2 in)
- Position: Goalkeeper

Youth career
- 1997–1999: Muroran Otani High School

Senior career*
| Years | Team | Apps | (Gls) |
| 2000–2008 | Kyoto Sanga FC | 22 | (0) |
| 2004–2005 | →Sanfrecce Hiroshima (loan) | 0 | (0) |
| 2009–2011 | Tokushima Vortis | 65 | (0) |
| Total | | 87 | (0) |
Medal record
Kyoto Sanga FC
| Winner | Emperor's Cup | 2002 |
- * Club domestic league appearances and goals

Hideaki Ueno (上野 秀章, Ueno Hideaki; born May 31, 1981) is a former Japanese football player.

== Playing career ==
Ueno was born in Muroran on May 31, 1981. After graduating from high school, he joined J1 League club Kyoto Purple Sanga (later Kyoto Sanga FC) in 2000. However he could hardly play in the match behind Shigetatsu Matsunaga and Naohito Hirai.

In June 2004, he moved to Sanfrecce Hiroshima on loan. However he could not play at all in the match behind Takashi Shimoda until 2005.

In 2006, he returned to Kyoto.

In 2007, he played as regular goalkeeper until May in J2 League. However he could hardly play in the match after that. In 2009, he moved to J2 club Tokushima Vortis.

In 2009, he played full time in all 51 matches. However his opportunity to play decreased in 2010 and he could not play at all in the match in 2011.

He retired end of 2011 season.

== Club statistics ==
| Club performance | | | League | | Cup | | League Cup | | Total | |
| Season | Club | League | Apps | Goals | Apps | Goals | Apps | Goals | Apps | Goals |
| Japan | | | League | | Emperor's Cup | | J.League Cup | | Total | |
|---|---|---|---|---|---|---|---|---|---|---|
| 2000 | Kyoto Purple Sanga | J1 League | 0 | 0 | 0 | 0 | 0 | 0 | 0 | 0 |
| 2001 | Kyoto Purple Sanga | J2 League | 0 | 0 | 4 | 0 | 0 | 0 | 4 | 0 |
| 2002 | Kyoto Purple Sanga | J1 League | 4 | 0 | 0 | 0 | 0 | 0 | 4 | 0 |
| 2003 | Kyoto Purple Sanga | J1 League | 2 | 0 | 0 | 0 | 0 | 0 | 2 | 0 |
| 2004 | Kyoto Purple Sanga | J2 League | 0 | 0 | 0 | 0 | - | | 0 | 0 |
| 2004 | Sanfrecce Hiroshima | J1 League | 0 | 0 | 0 | 0 | 0 | 0 | 0 | 0 |
| 2005 | Sanfrecce Hiroshima | J1 League | 0 | 0 | 0 | 0 | 0 | 0 | 0 | 0 |
| 2006 | Kyoto Purple Sanga | J1 League | 0 | 0 | 0 | 0 | 0 | 0 | 0 | 0 |
| 2007 | Kyoto Sanga FC | J2 League | 16 | 0 | 1 | 0 | - | | 17 | 0 |
| 2008 | Kyoto Sanga FC | J1 League | 0 | 0 | 0 | 0 | 0 | 0 | 0 | 0 |
| 2009 | Tokushima Vortis | J2 League | 51 | 0 | 0 | 0 | - | | 51 | 0 |
| 2010 | Tokushima Vortis | J2 League | 14 | 0 | 1 | 0 | - | | 15 | 0 |
| 2011 | Tokushima Vortis | J2 League | 0 | 0 | 0 | 0 | - | | 0 | 0 |
| Total | | | 87 | 0 | 6 | 0 | 0 | 0 | 93 | 0 |
