= Kentoku Noborio =

Japanese footballer

Personal information
- Date of birth: November 30, 1983 (age 42)
- Place of birth: Kagoshima, Japan
- Height: 1.84 m (6 ft 1/2 in)
- Position: Defender

Youth career
- 2002–2005: Fukuoka University

Senior career*
Years	Team	Apps	(Gls)
2006–2008	Kyoto Sanga FC	20	(0)
2008–2011	Tokushima Vortis	88	(6)
2012	Giravanz Kitakyushu	8	(1)
2013	Volca Kagoshima		
Total		116	(7)
- * Club domestic league appearances and goals

Kentoku Noborio (登尾 顕徳, Noborio Kentoku; born November 30, 1983) is a former Japanese football player.

== Club statistics ==
Club performance			League		Cup		League Cup		Total	
Season	Club	League	Apps	Goals	Apps	Goals	Apps	Goals	Apps	Goals
Japan			League		Emperor's Cup		J.League Cup		Total	
2006	Kyoto Purple Sanga	J1 League	20	0	1	0	2	0	23	0
2007	Kyoto Sanga FC	J2 League	0	0	1	0	-		1	0
2008	Kyoto Sanga FC	J1 League	0	0	0	0	0	0	0	0
2008	Tokushima Vortis	J2 League	35	0	1	0	-		36	0
2009	Tokushima Vortis	J2 League	39	5	1	0	-		40	5
2010	Tokushima Vortis	J2 League								
Country	Japan		94	5	4	0	2	0	100	5
Total			94	5	4	0	2	0	100	5
