= 2007 Japanese Super Cup =

Urawa Reds	Gamba Osaka
0	4
- Date: February 24, 2007
- Venue: National Stadium, Tokyo
- Attendance: 35,307

2007 Japanese Super Cup was the Japanese Super Cup competition. The match was played at National Stadium in Tokyo on February 24, 2007. Gamba Osaka won the championship.

== Match details ==
February 24, 2007

Urawa Reds	0–4	Gamba Osaka

National Stadium
Attendance: 35,307
