= Takahiro Ohara =

Japanese footballer

Personal information
- Full name: Takahiro Ohara
- Date of birth: December 6, 1986 (age 39)
- Place of birth: Fukushima, Japan
- Height: 1.84 m (6 ft 1/2 in)
- Position: Defender

Youth career
- 2005–2008: Tokai University

Senior career*
Years	Team	Apps	(Gls)
2009–2010	Tokushima Vortis	0	(0)
2010–2011	Grulla Morioka	23	(4)
2012–2015	Fukushima United FC	80	(6)
Total		103	(10)
- * Club domestic league appearances and goals

Takahiro Ohara (大原 卓丈, Ohara Takahiro; born December 6, 1986) is a former Japanese football player.

== Playing career ==
Takahiro Ohara played for Tokushima Vortis, Grulla Morioka and Fukushima United FC from 2009 to 2015.
