= Shinichi Terada =

Japanese footballer

Shinichi Terada 寺田 紳一
Personal information
- Full name: Shinichi Terada
- Date of birth: June 10, 1985 (age 41)
- Place of birth: Ibaraki, Osaka, Japan
- Height: 1.71 m (5 ft 7 in)
- Position: Midfielder

Team information
- Current team: Ococias Kyoto
- Number: 7

Youth career
- 1998–2003: Gamba Osaka

Senior career*
| Years | Team | Apps | (Gls) |
| 2004–2012 | Gamba Osaka | 71 | (5) |
| 2010–2011 | → Yokohama FC (loan) | 46 | (4) |
| 2012–2017 | Yokohama FC | 174 | (8) |
| 2018–2019 | Tochigi SC | 20 | (1) |
| 2020– | Ococias Kyoto | | |
Medal record
Gamba Osaka
| Winner | AFC Champions League | 2008 |
| Winner | J1 League | 2005 |
| Winner | J.League Cup | 2007 |
| Runner-up | J.League Cup | 2005 |
| Winner | Emperor's Cup | 2008 |
| Winner | Emperor's Cup | 2009 |
| Runner-up | Emperor's Cup | 2006 |
| Runner-up | Emperor's Cup | 2012 |
Representing Japan
AFC U-19 Championship
| Bronze medal – third place | 2004 Malaysia |
- * Club domestic league appearances and goals as of end of 2018 season

Shinichi Terada (寺田 紳一, Terada Shinichi; born June 10, 1985) is a Japanese football player who plays for Ococias Kyoto AC.

== Career ==
On 6 January 2020, Terada joined Ococias Kyoto AC.

== Club statistics ==
Updated to 23 February 2018.

| Club performance | | | League | | Cup | | League Cup | | Continental | | Total | |
| Season | Club | League | Apps | Goals | Apps | Goals | Apps | Goals | Apps | Goals | Apps | Goals |
| Japan | | | League | | Emperor's Cup | | J.League Cup | | AFC | | Total | |
|---|---|---|---|---|---|---|---|---|---|---|---|---|
| 2004 | Gamba Osaka | J1 League | 1 | 0 | 2 | 0 | 0 | 0 | - | | 3 | 0 |
| 2005 | Gamba Osaka | J1 League | 2 | 0 | 2 | 1 | 3 | 1 | - | | 7 | 2 |
| 2006 | Gamba Osaka | J1 League | 20 | 0 | 3 | 1 | 0 | 0 | 0 | 0 | 23 | 1 |
| 2007 | Gamba Osaka | J1 League | 21 | 2 | 4 | 3 | 6 | 1 | - | | 31 | 6 |
| 2008 | Gamba Osaka | J1 League | 13 | 2 | 3 | 0 | 3 | 0 | 3 | 0 | 22 | 2 |
| 2009 | Gamba Osaka | J1 League | 5 | 1 | 0 | 0 | 1 | 0 | 3 | 0 | 9 | 1 |
| 2010 | Yokohama FC | J2 League | 28 | 4 | 1 | 0 | - | | - | | 29 | 4 |
| 2011 | Yokohama FC | J2 League | 18 | 0 | 0 | 0 | - | | - | | 18 | 0 |
| 2012 | Gamba Osaka | J1 League | 9 | 0 | 0 | 0 | 0 | 0 | - | | 9 | 0 |
| 2012 | Yokohama FC | J2 League | 16 | 0 | 0 | 0 | - | | - | | 16 | 0 |
| 2013 | Yokohama FC | J2 League | 38 | 2 | 0 | 0 | - | | - | | 38 | 2 |
| 2014 | Yokohama FC | J2 League | 41 | 3 | 1 | 0 | - | | - | | 42 | 3 |
| 2015 | Yokohama FC | J2 League | 40 | 2 | 0 | 0 | – | | – | | 40 | 2 |
| 2016 | Yokohama FC | J2 League | 29 | 1 | 2 | 0 | – | | – | | 31 | 1 |
| 2017 | Yokohama FC | J2 League | 10 | 0 | 1 | 0 | – | | – | | 11 | 0 |
| Career total | | | 291 | 17 | 19 | 5 | 13 | 2 | 6 | 0 | 329 | 24 |

== Team honours ==
- AFC Champions League - 2008
- J1 League - 2005
- Emperor's Cup - 2008
- J.League Cup - 2007
