= 2011 Tokushima Vortis season =

Tokushima Vortis
2011 season
- Manager: Naohiko Minobe
- Stadium: Pocarisweat Stadium
- J2 League: 4 th

2011 Tokushima Vortis season.

== J2 League ==
| Match | Date | Team | Score | Team | Venue | Attendance |
|---|---|---|---|---|---|---|
| 1 | 2011.03.06 | Tokushima Vortis | 1-0 | Gainare Tottori | Pocarisweat Stadium | 5,854 |
| 8 | 2011.04.23 | Mito HollyHock | 2-1 | Tokushima Vortis | K's denki Stadium Mito | 1,273 |
| 9 | 2011.04.30 | Tokushima Vortis | 1-0 | JEF United Chiba | Pocarisweat Stadium | 4,462 |
| 10 | 2011.05.04 | Oita Trinita | 2-2 | Tokushima Vortis | Oita Bank Dome | 8,829 |
| 11 | 2011.05.08 | Tokushima Vortis | 2-1 | Kyoto Sanga FC | Pocarisweat Stadium | 4,694 |
| 12 | 2011.05.14 | Ehime FC | 0-1 | Tokushima Vortis | Ningineer Stadium | 5,622 |
| 13 | 2011.05.22 | FC Gifu | 0-2 | Tokushima Vortis | Gifu Nagaragawa Stadium | 4,163 |
| 14 | 2011.05.28 | Tokushima Vortis | 0-4 | Tochigi SC | Pocarisweat Stadium | 2,165 |
| 15 | 2011.06.04 | Sagan Tosu | 1-1 | Tokushima Vortis | Best Amenity Stadium | 5,242 |
| 16 | 2011.06.12 | Tokushima Vortis | 2-2 | Fagiano Okayama | Pocarisweat Stadium | 4,885 |
| 17 | 2011.06.19 | FC Tokyo | 1-0 | Tokushima Vortis | Ajinomoto Stadium | 14,530 |
| 18 | 2011.06.25 | Tokushima Vortis | 4-0 | Shonan Bellmare | Pocarisweat Stadium | 3,558 |
| 2 | 2011.06.29 | Kataller Toyama | 0-2 | Tokushima Vortis | Toyama Stadium | 1,716 |
| 19 | 2011.07.02 | Yokohama FC | 0-1 | Tokushima Vortis | NHK Spring Mitsuzawa Football Stadium | 3,048 |
| 20 | 2011.07.09 | Tokushima Vortis | 3-0 | Thespa Kusatsu | Pocarisweat Stadium | 3,801 |
| 21 | 2011.07.16 | Tokushima Vortis | 2-2 | Tokyo Verdy | Pocarisweat Stadium | 5,234 |
| 22 | 2011.07.24 | Gainare Tottori | 0-2 | Tokushima Vortis | Tottori Bank Bird Stadium | 5,720 |
| 23 | 2011.07.30 | Tokushima Vortis | 3-1 | Kataller Toyama | Pocarisweat Stadium | 5,189 |
| 3 | 2011.08.05 | Tokushima Vortis | 0-1 | Giravanz Kitakyushu | Pocarisweat Stadium | 3,262 |
| 24 | 2011.08.14 | Tokushima Vortis | 1-1 | Mito HollyHock | Pocarisweat Stadium | 5,252 |
| 25 | 2011.08.21 | Roasso Kumamoto | 0-1 | Tokushima Vortis | Kumamoto Athletics Stadium | 5,345 |
| 26 | 2011.08.28 | Tokushima Vortis | 1-2 | Oita Trinita | Pocarisweat Stadium | 5,429 |
| 4 | 2011.08.31 | Thespa Kusatsu | 2-0 | Tokushima Vortis | Shoda Shoyu Stadium Gunma | 1,266 |
| 27 | 2011.09.10 | Giravanz Kitakyushu | 1-1 | Tokushima Vortis | Honjo Stadium | 4,021 |
| 28 | 2011.09.19 | Tokushima Vortis | 4-1 | FC Gifu | Pocarisweat Stadium | 2,332 |
| 29 | 2011.09.24 | Consadole Sapporo | 0-0 | Tokushima Vortis | Sapporo Atsubetsu Stadium | 10,215 |
| 5 | 2011.09.28 | Tokushima Vortis | 1-0 | Roasso Kumamoto | Pocarisweat Stadium | 2,424 |
| 30 | 2011.10.02 | Tokushima Vortis | 0-2 | FC Tokyo | Pocarisweat Stadium | 9,118 |
| 31 | 2011.10.16 | Kyoto Sanga FC | 1-2 | Tokushima Vortis | Kyoto Nishikyogoku Athletic Stadium | 5,690 |
| 6 | 2011.10.19 | Tokyo Verdy | 1-0 | Tokushima Vortis | Tokyo National Stadium | 3,305 |
| 32 | 2011.10.23 | Tokushima Vortis | 4-1 | Yokohama FC | Pocarisweat Stadium | 7,358 |
| 7 | 2011.10.26 | Tokushima Vortis | 0-2 | Consadole Sapporo | Pocarisweat Stadium | 3,571 |
| 33 | 2011.10.30 | JEF United Chiba | 0-1 | Tokushima Vortis | Fukuda Denshi Arena | 10,015 |
| 34 | 2011.11.06 | Tokushima Vortis | 2-2 | Ehime FC | Pocarisweat Stadium | 8,421 |
| 35 | 2011.11.12 | Tochigi SC | 0-1 | Tokushima Vortis | Tochigi Green Stadium | 4,404 |
| 36 | 2011.11.19 | Shonan Bellmare | 1-2 | Tokushima Vortis | Hiratsuka Stadium | 3,680 |
| 37 | 2011.11.27 | Tokushima Vortis | 0-3 | Sagan Tosu | Pocarisweat Stadium | 11,916 |
| 38 | 2011.12.03 | Fagiano Okayama | 1-0 | Tokushima Vortis | Kanko Stadium | 8,833 |
