= Gamba Osaka =

Gamba Osaka ガンバ大阪
- Full name: Gamba Osaka
- Nicknames: Nerazzurri, Aokuro (Black-and-Blues)
- Founded: 1991; 35 years ago
- Stadium: Panasonic Stadium Suita
- Capacity: 39,694
- Owner(s): Panasonic (70%); The Kansai Electric Power Company (10%); Osaka Gas (10%); JR West (10%)
- Chairman: Naohito Mizutani
- Manager: Tomokazu Myojin
- League: J1 League
- 2026: J1 League, 9th of 20
- Website: gamba-osaka.net
Home colours	Away colours

Gamba Osaka (ガンバ大阪, Ganba Ōsaka) is a Japanese professional football club based in Osaka. The club plays in the J1 League, which is the top tier of football in the country. The club's home stadium is Panasonic Stadium Suita. They form a local rivalry with Osaka city-based Cerezo Osaka.

Gamba is among the most accomplished Japanese clubs, having won 2 J1 League titles, 1 J2 League title, 5 Emperor's Cup, 2 J.League Cup and 2 Japanese Super Cup. Continentally, they have won the 2008 AFC Champions League and most recently the 2025-26 AFC Champions League Two. Internationally, the club has made a single appearance in the FIFA Club World Cup with their most recent appearance being in the 2008 edition finishing in third place.

== History ==
It was founded in 1980 as Matsushita Electric SC by the mononymous company, which is now known as Panasonic, in Nara Prefecture and became a member of the Japan Soccer League. It was mostly made of remaining players and staff of the defunct Yanmar Club, the former B-team of Yanmar Diesel SC, later to be known as Cerezo Osaka. Gamba Osaka was an original member ("Original Ten" (Note: The original clubs of the J.League in 1993 were Kashima Antlers, Urawa Red Diamonds, JEF United Ichihara, Verdy Kawasaki, Yokohama Marinos, Yokohama Flügels, Shimizu S-Pulse, Nagoya Grampus Eight, Gamba Osaka and Sanfrecce Hiroshima.)) of the first J.League season. Due to participation in the J League, the club name was changed to Panasonic Gamba Osaka in 1992.

In 1996, the club dropped the name Panasonic from its front while its corporate name was changed from "Matsushita Soccer Club Co., Ltd." to "Gamba Osaka Co., Ltd."

=== Record breaking ===
In 2005, the club claimed its first J.League title on a dramatic final day during which any of five clubs could have claimed the championship. Gamba needed to win, and have cross town rivals Cerezo Osaka draw or lose. Gamba Osaka defeated a valiant Kawasaki Frontale 4–2, while victory was snatched from Cerezo Osaka by a last-minute FC Tokyo equalizer. In an AFC Champions League match in 2006, Gamba defeated Vietnamese side Đà Nẵng in a record-equaling victory of 15–0. In the 2008 Pan-Pacific Championship final, Gamba beat MLS club Houston Dynamo 6–1 to win the tournament, in large part because of Bare who scored 4 goals in the final (5 in all at the tournament). After his brilliant display and having just scored 10 goals in 18 games for Gamba in the domestic league, he was sold to UAE club Al-Ahli for 1 billion yen.

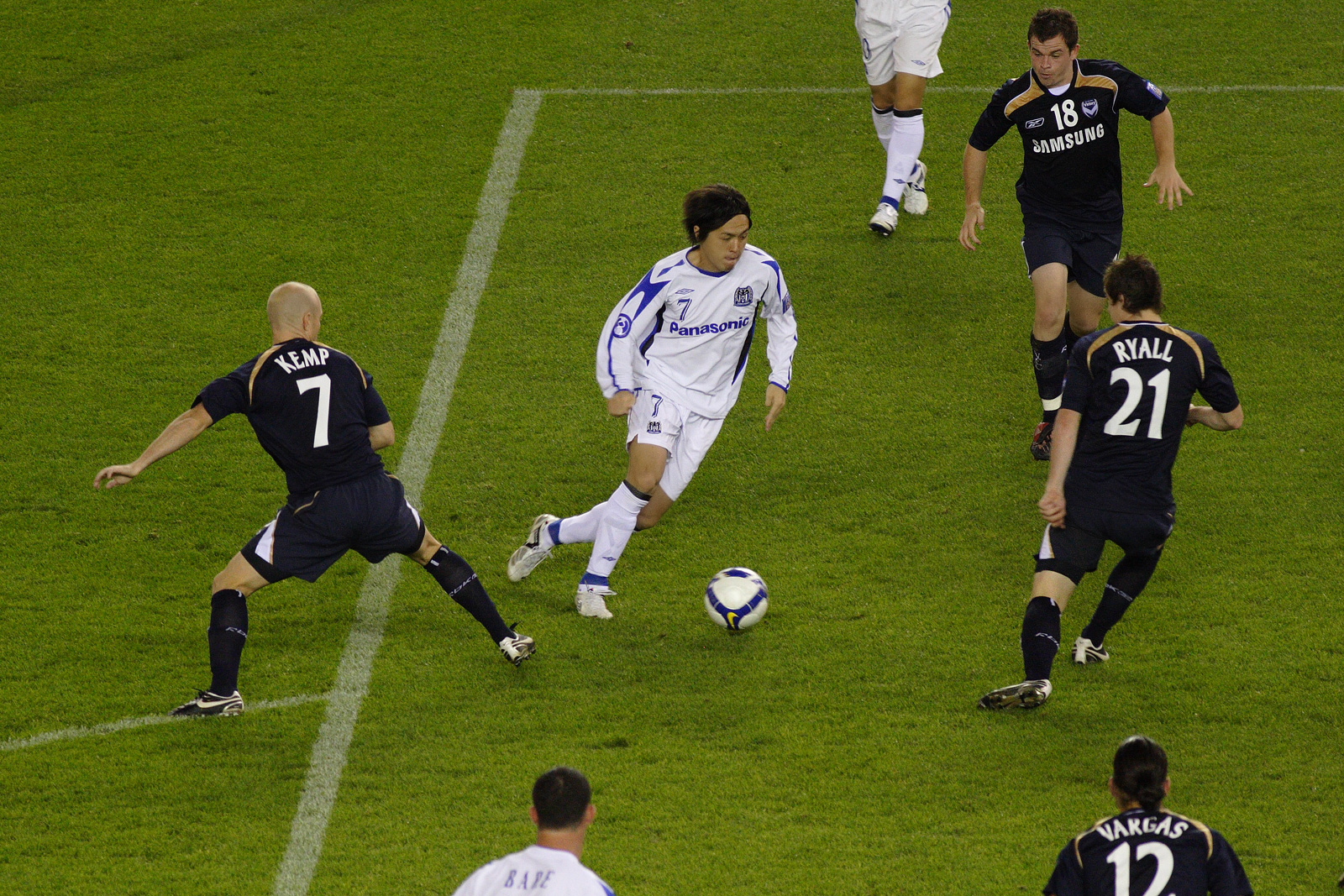
Gamba Osaka playing against the Melbourne Victory in the 2008 AFC Champions League

=== Asian champions ===
In October 2008, Gamba Osaka for the first time in their history, reached the final of the AFC Champions League after defeating fellow Japanese league rivals Urawa Red Diamonds 4–2 on aggregate after a 1–1 draw at home in the first leg, Gamba registered one of the most historic comebacks in Champions League history when they came back from being behind 1–0 before half time to win 1–3 with all goals scored in the second half at Saitama. Gamba Osaka went on to win the 2008 AFC Champions League title after winning 5–0 on aggregate against the giant-killing Australian club Adelaide United in the final. They became the fifth Japanese club to win the top Asian title, after Urawa, Júbilo Iwata, then-company-affiliated Yomiuri (now Tokyo Verdy), and Furukawa Electric (now JEF United Ichihara Chiba).

In December 2008, Gamba Osaka made it to the semi-finals of the 2008 FIFA Club World Cup after beating Australian club Adelaide United 1–0. They were beaten in the semi-finals by 2007–08 Premier League and 2007–08 UEFA Champions League winners Manchester United. On 21 December 2008, they played for third place against Mexican side Pachuca with Gamba winning the match 1–0.

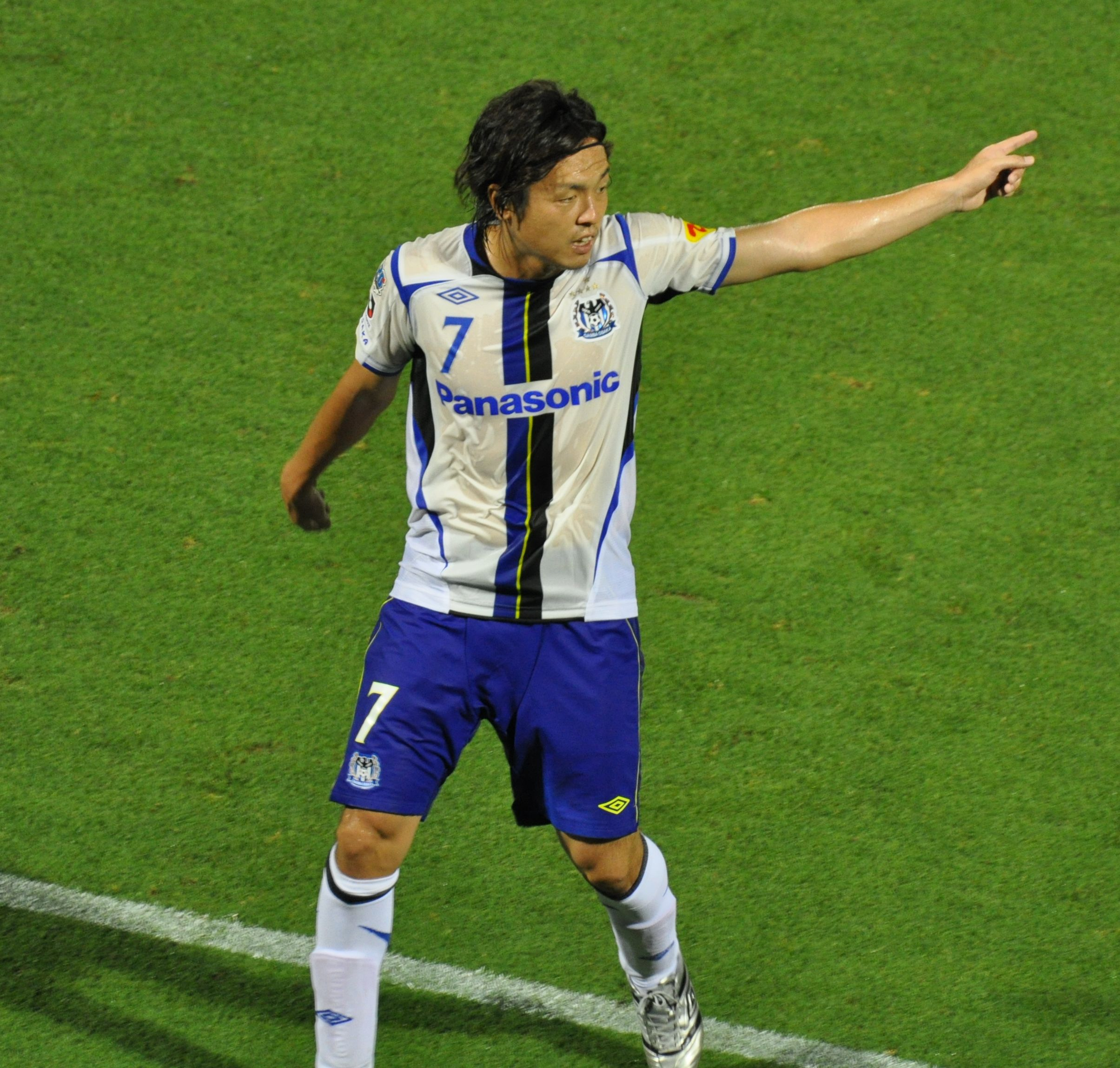
Yasuhito Endō is the club most successful player and J1 League highest number of appearances at 790.

In December 2012, Gamba Osaka were relegated from J1 League after losing 2–1 to Júbilo Iwata. Gamba Osaka finished 17th in the league despite scoring more goals than any other club, including Champion Sanfrecce Hiroshima. Ultimately, although Gamba had a positive goal difference at the end of the season, Gamba could not overcome their poor defense, which allowed the second most goals in Division 1 after Consadole Sapporo. This also made Gamba Osaka the fastest club to suffer relegation from the top division after winning the AFC Champion's League and playing in the FIFA Club World Cup, the relegation being only four years later.

=== J2 League champions and domestic treble ===
However, the club bounced back in the 2013 season, becoming the J2 League title champion and directly promoting to Division 1 again after only one season.

In 2014, Gamba Osaka won the J1 League title, a year after winning the second division, becoming the second club in the professional era to achieve this feat (after Kashiwa Reysol in 2011). That same year, Gamba Osaka also became the second club to win the domestic treble (after Kashima Antlers in 2000), by winning the J.League Cup and the Emperor's Cup as well.

2015 saw Gamba Osaka return to the AFC Champions League for the first time since 2012, where they advanced all the way to the semi-finals before being eliminated by eventual winner and 2015 FIFA Club World Cup fourth place finisher, Guangzhou Evergrande 1–2 on aggregate. Domestically, Gamba Osaka advanced to the final of both the 2015 J.League Cup and the J1 League Championship, losing to Kashima Antlers 0–3 and Club World Cup third-place side Sanfrecce Hiroshima 3–4 respectively. Gamba Osaka successfully defended their status as the 2015 Emperor's Cup winners, defeating Urawa Red Diamonds 2–1.\

In 2020, Gamba Osaka finished as the 2020 J1 League runners up in which saw the club returned to the 2021 AFC Champions League once again since 2017. Gamba Osaka was than drawn in Group H alongside South Korean giants Jeonbuk Hyundai Motors, Thailand club Chiangrai United and Singaporean side Tampines Rovers. On 7 July 2021, Gamba Osaka managed to record their highest ever win in the AFC Champions League after thrashing Tampines Rovers 8–1 at the Bunyodkor Stadium where Shuhei Kawasaki scored a hat-trick in the match. However, the club failed to qualified to the Round of 16 even when they finished the group as runners up due to accumulating 9 points.

==== Back to continental competition since 2020 and AFC Champions League Two Winners ====
In the 2024 season, Gamba Osaka finished in fourth in the league which sees the club qualified to the 2025–26 AFC Champions League Two group stage being drawn in Group F alongside Vietnamese club Nam Định, Thailand club Ratchaburi and Hong Kong club Eastern. On their return to continental tournament, Gamba Osaka won 3–1 against Hong Kong club Eastern on 17 September 2025. Gamba Osaka then qualified to the 2025–26 AFC Champions League Two round of 16 as group leaders facing against Korean side Pohang Steelers in which Gamba Osaka won 3–2 on aggregate thus qualifying to the quarter-finals where they would face Ratchaburi. In the quarter-finals, Gamba Osaka went on to win 3–2 on aggregate thus seeing them advance to the semi-finals. Gamba Osaka went on to win 3–1 on aggregate in the semi-finals against Thailand club Bangkok United to book their spot in the AFC Champions League Two final. On 16 May 2026, Gamba Osaka won the 2025-26 AFC Champions League Two after defeating Al Nassr 1-0 in the fully-packaging King Saud University Stadium, with the only first-half 30min goal from Deniz Hummet. They become first Japanese team who won both of AFC Champions League Elite and AFC Champions League Two.

== Team image ==
=== Name origin ===
The club's name Gamba comes from the Japanese ganbaru (頑張る), meaning "to do your best" or "to stand firm".

=== In popular culture ===
In the Captain Tsubasa manga series, two characters are from Gamba Osaka: the defender Makoto Soda and the forward Takashi Sugimoto.

=== Osaka derby ===
Gamba's fiercest rival are fellow locals Cerezo Osaka with whom they contest the Osaka derby. Also have a heavy rivalry with Saitama's Urawa Red Diamonds, which they make the "National Derby" of Japan.

=== Crest ===
1991–2021

since 2021

== Stadium ==
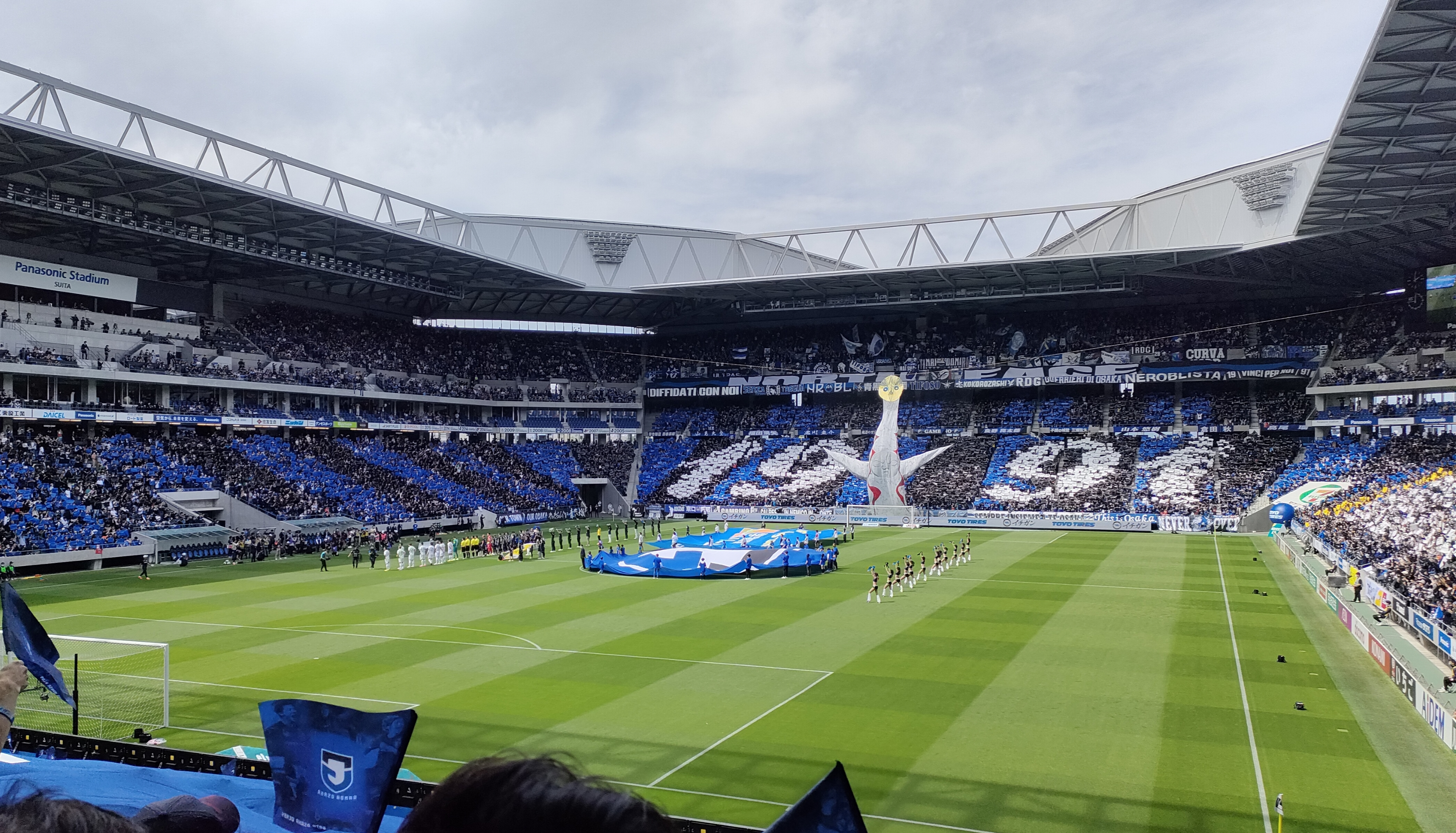
A panoramic view of Suita City Football Stadium

Gamba Osaka used the Expo '70 Commemorative Stadium in the Expo Commemoration Park as its home stadium from 1980 through 2015, which seats around 21,000.

Gamba Osaka then began construction of a new modern stadium only meant for football in December 2013 called Suita City Football Stadium in the same park, with a seating capacity of 39,694. The new stadium then opened in October 2015 and had its inaugural official match during the Panasonic Cup on 14 February 2016, an exhibition match during which Gamba Osaka hosted fellow J1 League club Nagoya Grampus.

Suita City Football Stadium also make its debut in the EA Sports video game, FIFA 17 becoming the first Japanese club to feature its own stadium in a video game up until FIFA 22.

== Kit suppliers and shirt sponsors ==
=== Sponsors ===
Period	Kit manufacturer	Main sponsors
1981	(Japan) Asics	No sponsors
1982–1984	(England) Admiral	No sponsors
1984–1990	(Japan) Asics	(Japan) Matsushita Electric
1991–1992	(Germany) Adidas	(Japan) Panasonic
1993–1996	(Japan) Mizuno	(Japan) Panasonic
1997–1998	(Germany) Adidas	(Japan) Panasonic
1999–2002	(France) Le Coq Sportif	(Japan) Panasonic
2003–2022	(England) Umbro	(Japan) Panasonic
2023–present	(Denmark) Hummel	(Japan) Panasonic

=== Kit evolution ===
FP 1st
1993–1994	1995–1996	1997–1998	1999–2000	2001–2002
2003–2004	2005–2006	2007–2008	2009–2010	2011–2012
2013	2014	2015	2016	2017
2018	2019	2020	2021	2022
2023	2024	2025	2026–	

FP 2nd
1993–1994	1995–1996	1997–1998	1999–2000	2001–2002
2003–2004	2005–2006	2007–2008	2009–2010	2011–2012
2013	2014	2015	2016	2017
2018	2019	2020	2021	2022
2023	2024	2025	2026–	

FP Other
2003 - 2004; 3rd	2005 - 2006; 3rd	2008 - 2009; ACL	2010 ACL	2011 3rd
2011 ACL	2011; 20th Anniversary	2012; World Expo Kicking Anniversary	2015 ACL	2016 ACL
2017 ACL	2017; Gamba Expo	2018; Gamba Expo	2019; Gamba Expo	2020; Win at home
2021; ACL 1st	2021; ACL 2nd	2021; 30th Anniversary	2021; Gamba Expo	2022; Gamba Expo
2023; Gamba Expo	2024; Gamba Expo	2025; GAMBA EXPO	ACL2; 2025/26; 1st	ACL2; 2025/26; 2nd

== Affiliated clubs ==
- (Thailand) Chonburi (2023–present)

On 6 February 2023, Gamba Osaka sign partnership with Thai League 1 club, Chonburi. The alliance intends to strengthen the top team through player transfers, training-type loans and other mutual exchange of coaching staff and players. In conjunction with this new agreement, JFA-certified S-class coaches are currently undergoing overseas training at Chonburi (from 30 January 2023 to 12 February 2023) under the tutelage of Daisuke Machinaka. Under this agreement the teams will share and cooperate with player scouting information to mutually improve both teams.

- (Netherlands) AFC Ajax (2024–present)

On 4 March 2024, Gamba Osaka and 36-time Eredivisie champions announce a strategic partnership to advance talent identification and development initiatives in Japan. This exclusive collaboration is scheduled to extend over an initial three-year period. For Ajax, this partnership represents a significant opportunity to strengthen its global football network and identify and nurture young talents in the Japanese football landscape. Gamba Osaka, in turn, gains access to Ajax's training methodologies for its youth development program while establishing connections within the global football community.

== Players ==
=== First-team squad ===
As of 15 September 2026.

Note: Flags indicate national team as defined under FIFA eligibility rules; some limited exceptions apply. Players may hold more than one non-FIFA nationality.

No.	Pos.	Nation	Player
1	GK	JPN	Masaaki Higashiguchi
2	DF	JPN	Shota Fukuoka
3	DF	JPN	Riku Handa
4	DF	JPN	Shinnosuke Nakatani (captain)
5	DF	JPN	Genta Miura
7	FW	JPN	Takashi Usami
8	FW	JPN	Ryotaro Meshino
9	FW	JPN	Daichi Hayashi
10	MF	JPN	Shu Kurata
11	FW	TUN	Issam Jebali
13	MF	JPN	Shuto Abe
14	FW	JPN	Asahi Uenaka
15	DF	JPN	Takeru Kishimoto
16	MF	JPN	Tokuma Suzuki
17	FW	JPN	Ryoya Yamashita
18	GK	JPN	Rui Araki
19	DF	JPN	Ginjiro Ikegaya
20	MF	AUS	Eli Adams
21	DF	JPN	Ryō Hatsuse
22	GK	JPN	Jun Ichimori
23	FW	TUR	Deniz Hümmet
24	MF	JPN	Tsuyoshi Ogashiwa

No.	Pos.	Nation	Player
25	DF	CIV	Ali Camara
27	MF	JPN	Rin Mito
28	MF	JPN	Soya Fujiwara
31	GK	JPN	Zhang Aolin
32	MF	JPN	Yuki Yoshihara
33	DF	JPN	Haruki Ozawa ^{DSP}
34	DF	JPN	Yuya Yokoi
35	MF	JPN	Taiki Tono
37	FW	JPN	Naru Nakatsumi
39	MF	JPN	Koshiro Sumi
41	MF	JPN	Yusei Toshida
43	GK	JPN	Yuma Nobata ^{Type 2}
44	MF	JPN	Kanji Okunuki
45	DF	JPN	Kaita Maruoka ^{Type 2}
46	MF	JPN	Kosuke Murata ^{Type 2}
47	DF	JPN	Shinya Nakano
48	MF	JPN	Yoshiki Fujimoto ^{Type 2}
60	MF	JPN	Arata Okamoto
67	DF	JPN	Shogo Sasaki
78	MF	ESP	Juanpe
97	FW	BRA	Welton

=== Out on loan ===
Note: Flags indicate national team as defined under FIFA eligibility rules; some limited exceptions apply. Players may hold more than one non-FIFA nationality.

No.	Pos.	Nation	Player
40	FW	JPN	Shoji Toyama (at Hokkaido Consadole Sapporo)
—	FW	JPN	Makoto Mitsuta (at Kashiwa Reysol)
—	MF	JPN	Takato Yamamoto (at (Germany) Borussia Dortmund II)
—	FW	JPN	Gaku Nawata (at (Belgium) Charleroi)

== Management and staff ==
Position	Name
Manager	(Japan) Tomokazu Myojin
Coach	(Japan) Yasuhito Endō (Japan) Shota Uemura (Japan) Kazumichi Takagi
Goalkeeper coach	(Japan) Motohiro Yoshida
Physical coach	(Japan) Koichiro Yoshimichi
Analyst	(Japan) Kento Nashimoto
Assistant coach and interpreter	(Japan) Takanori Okai
Doctor	(Japan) Yusuke Enomoto
Physiotherapist	(Japan) Yuta Tanaka (Japan) Yuki Nakamura
Trainer and physiotherapist	(Japan) Ryosuke Kaji
Trainer	(Japan) Satoshi Ikeguchi (Japan) Shotaro Shinba
Interpreter	(Japan) Masaki Kimura (Japan) Kazushi Shimizu (Japan) Yu Ono
Side manager and competent	(Japan) Atsushi Hashimoto
Side manager and side affairs	(Japan) Junji Yamashita (Japan) Shunsuke Hitomi

== Honours ==
As both Matsushita Electric (amateur era) and Gamba Osaka (professional era)

Type	Honours	Titles	Season
League	J1 League	2	2005, 2014
League	J2 League	1	2013
League	Japan Soccer League Division 2	1	1985–86
Cup	Emperor's Cup	5	1990, 2008, 2009, 2014, 2015
Cup	J.League Cup	2	2007, 2014
Cup	Japanese Super Cup	2	2007, 2015
Continental	AFC Champions League Elite	1	2008
Continental	AFC Champions League Two	1	2025–26
Regional	Queen's Cup	1	1992
Regional	Pan-Pacific Championship	1	2008

Bold is for those competition that are currently active.

== Records and statistics ==
As of 18 March 2026.

Top 10 all-time appearances
Rank	Player	Years	Club appearance
1	(Japan) Yasuhito Endō	2001–2021	790
2	(Japan) Takahiro Futagawa	1999–2016	599
3	(Japan) Shu Kurata	2007–present	572
4	(Japan) Satoshi Yamaguchi	2001–2011	444
5	(Japan) Hideo Hashimoto	1998–2011	424
6	(Japan) Hiroki Fujiharu	2011−2024	418
7	(Japan) Masaaki Higashiguchi	2014–present	415
8	(Japan) Takashi Usami	2009–2016, 2019–present	415
9	(Japan) Yōsuke Fujigaya	2005–2013, 2015–2017	366
10	(Japan) Tomokazu Myojin	2006–2015	361

Top 10 all-time goalscorer
Rank	Player	Club appearance	Total goals
1	(Japan) Takashi Usami	415	140
2	(Japan) Yasuhito Endō	790	125
3	(Brazil) Patric	242	85
4	(Japan) Shu Kurata	572	73
5	(Japan) Masanobu Matsunami	354	67
5	(Japan) Takahiro Futagawa	599	67
7	(Japan) Masashi Oguro	140	64
8	(Brazil) Magno Alves	75	52
9	(Brazil) Magrão	81	51
10	(Brazil) Leandro Montera	69	50

- Biggest wins: 15–0 vs (Vietnam) SHB Đà Nẵng (22 March 2006)
- Heaviest defeats: 1–7 vs Kashiwa Reysol (4 May 1996)
- Youngest ever debutant: Akito Takagi ~ 16 years 8 months 12 days old (On 14 April 2014 vs Sagan Tosu)
- Oldest ever player: Yasuhito Endō ~ 40 years 7 months 26 days old (On 23 September 2020 vs Nagoya Grampus)
- Youngest goal scorers: Takashi Usami ~ 17 years 14 days old (On 20 May 2009 vs (South Korea) FC Seoul)
- Oldest goal scorers: Yasuhito Endō ~ 39 years 2 months 23 days old (On 20 April 2019 vs Ōita Trinita)

=== Top scorers by season ===
Season	Name	Goals
1993	(Japan) Akihiro Nagashima	12
1994	(Japan) Toshihiro Yamaguchi	16
1995	(Netherlands) Hans Gillhaus	20
1996	(Croatia) Mladen Mladenović	11
1997	(Cameroon) Patrick M'Boma	25
1998	(Japan) Hiromi Kojima	17
1999	(Japan) Hiromi Kojima (Brazil) Luizinho Vieira	6
2000	(Japan) Hiromi Kojima	9
2001	(Croatia) Nino Bule	17
2002	(Brazil) Magrão	22
2003	(Brazil) Magrão	15
2004	(Japan) Masashi Oguro	20
2005	(Brazil) Araújo	33
2006	(Brazil) Magno Alves	26
2007	(Brazil) Baré	20

Season	Name	Goals
2008	(Brazil) Baré	10
2009	(Brazil) Leandro	11
2010	(Japan) Shoki Hirai	14
2011	(South Korea) Lee Keun-ho	15
2012	(Brazil) Leandro	14
2013	(Japan) Takashi Usami	19
2014	(Japan) Takashi Usami	10
2015	(Japan) Takashi Usami	19
2016	(Japan) Shun Nagasawa (Brazil) Ademilson	9
2017	(Japan) Shun Nagasawa	10
2018	(South Korea) Hwang Ui-Jo	16
2019	(Brazil) Ademilson	10
2020	(Brazil) Patric	11
2021	(Brazil) Patric	23
2022	(Brazil) Patric	10

Season	Name	Goals
2023	(Brazil) Juan Alano	7
2024	(Japan) Takashi Usami	12
2025	(Japan) Takashi Usami	8
2026	(Turkey) (Sweden) Deniz Hümmet	8

== Award winners ==
As of the end of the 2025 season.

Domestic

- J.League Player of the Year:
  - (Brazil) Araújo (2005)
  - (Japan) Yasuhito Endō (2014)
- J.League Top Scorer:
  - (Cameroon) Patrick M'Boma (1997)
  - (Brazil) Araújo (2005)
  - (Brazil) Magno Alves (2006)
- J.League Best XI:
  - (Cameroon) Patrick M'Boma (1997)
  - (Japan) Junichi Inamoto (2000)
  - (Japan) Yasuhito Endō (2003, 2004, 2005, 2006, 2007, 2008, 2009, 2010, 2011, 2012, 2014, 2015)
  - (Japan) Masashi Oguro (2004)
  - (Brazil) Araújo (2005)
  - (Brazil) Fernandinho (2005)
  - (Japan) Satoshi Yamaguchi (2006, 2007, 2008)
  - (Japan) Ryōta Tsuzuki (2006)
  - (Brazil) Magno Alves (2006)
  - (Brazil) Baré (2007)
  - (Brazil) Patric (2014)
  - (Japan) Takashi Usami (2014, 2015, 2024)
  - (Japan) Yosuke Ideguchi (2017)
  - (South Korea) Hwang Ui-jo (2018)
  - (Japan) Shinnosuke Nakatani (2024)
- J.League Best Young Player:
  - (Japan) Takashi Usami (2010)
  - (Japan) Yosuke Ideguchi (2016)
- Individual Fair Play Award:
  - (Japan) Masashi Oguro (2005)
- J.League Goal of the Year
  - (Japan) Takashi Usami against Hokkaido Consadole Sapporo (30 November 2024)
- J.League Manager of the Year:
  - (Japan) Akira Nishino (2005)
  - (Japan) Kenta Hasegawa (2014)
  - (Japan) Tsuneyasu Miyamoto (2020)
- J.League Cup MVP:
  - (Japan) Michihiro Yasuda (2007)
  - (Brazil) Patric (2014)
- J.League Cup New Hero Award:
  - (Japan) Michihiro Yasuda (2007)
  - (Japan) Takashi Usami (2014)

International

- Asian Footballer of the Year:
  - (Japan) Yasuhito Endō (2009)
- AFC Champions League Most Valuable Player:
  - (Japan) Yasuhito Endō (2008)
- AFC Champions League Top Scorer:
  - (Brazil) Magno Alves (2006)

- (Brazil) Leandro (2009)

=== FIFA World Cup players ===
The following players have been selected by their country in the FIFA World Cup, while playing for Gamba Osaka:

- (Cameroon) Patrick M'Boma (1998)
- (Japan) Tsuneyasu Miyamoto (2002, 2006)
- (Japan) Akira Kaji (2006)
- (Japan) Yasuhito Endō (2006, 2010, 2014)
- (Japan) Yasuyuki Konno (2010, 2014)
- (Japan) Masaaki Higashiguchi (2018)

=== Olympic players ===
The following players have represented their country at the Summer Olympic Games whilst playing for Gamba Osaka:

- (Japan) Shigeru Morioka (1996)
- (Japan) Tsuneyasu Miyamoto (2000)
- (Japan) Junichi Inamoto (2000)
- (Japan) Ryōta Tsuzuki (2000)
- (Japan) Michihiro Yasuda (2008)
- (Japan) Yosuke Ideguchi (2016)
- (Japan) Hiroki Fujiharu (2016)

=== Greatest ever XI ===
In 2011, as part of the club's official celebration of their 20th anniversary, supporters cast votes to determine the greatest ever team.

- Goalkeeper

(Japan) Yōsuke Fujigaya (2005–2013, 2015–2017)

- Defenders

(Japan) Akira Kaji (2006–2014)
(Brazil) Sidiclei (2004–2007)
(Japan) Tsuneyasu Miyamoto (1995–2006)
(Japan) Satoshi Yamaguchi (2001–2011)

- Midfielders

(Japan) Yasuhito Endō (2001–2021)
(Japan) Tomokazu Myojin (2006–2015)
(Japan) Hideo Hashimoto (1998–2011)
(Japan) Takahiro Futagawa (1999–2016)

- Forwards

(Cameroon) Patrick M'Boma (1997–1998)
(Brazil) Araújo (2005)

== Managerial history ==
Name	Period	Honours	Notes
(Japan) Yoji Mizuguchi	1980–1991	Emperor's Cup: 1990	
(Japan) Kunishige Kamamoto	1991–1994		The competition formed as the J.League in 1993.
(Germany) Sigfried Held	1995		
(Croatia) Josip Kuže	1995–1997		
(Austria) Friedrich Koncilia	1997–1998		
(France) Frédéric Antonetti	1998–1999		J.League Division 2 was launched in 1999.
(Japan) Hiroshi Hayano	1999–2001		
(Japan) Kazuhiko Takemoto	2001		
(Japan) Akira Nishino	2002–2012	J.League Division 1: 2005; J.League Cup: 2007; Emperor's Cup: 2008, 2009; AFC Champions League: 2008; J.League Manager of the Year: 2005; AFC Coach of the Year: 2008	
(Brazil) José Carlos Serrão	2012		
(Japan) Masanobu Matsunami	2012		Gamba was relegated to the J.League Division 2 2013.
(Japan) Kenta Hasegawa	2013–2017	J.League Division 2: 2013; J.League Division 1: 2014; J.League Cup: 2014; Emperor's Cup: 2014, 2015; J.League Manager of the Year: 2014	Gamba was promoted to the J.League Division 1 2014. Asst Coach Asaph S.D; J3 League was launched in 2014.
(Brazil) Levir Culpi	2018		
(Japan) Tsuneyasu Miyamoto	2018–2021		
(Japan) Tomohiro Katanosaka	2022		
(Japan) Hiroshi Matsuda	2022		
(Spain) Dani Poyatos	2023–2025		
(Germany) Jens Wissing	2026		
(Japan) Tomokazu Myojin	2026–present		

== Season by season record ==
Champions	Runners-up	Third place	Promoted	Relegated

Season	Div.	Teams	Pos.	P	W(OTW/PKW)	D	L(OTL/PKL)	F	A	GD	Pts	Attendance	J.League Cup	Emperor's Cup	AFC CLE	FIFA CWC
1992	–												Group stage	Quarter final	Did not qualify	Did not qualify
1993	J1	10	7th	36	16	–	20	51	65	−14	–	21,571	Semi-final	2nd round	Did not qualify	Did not qualify
1994	J1	12	10th	44	15	–	29	66	82	−16	–	22,367	Semi-final	Semi-final	Did not qualify	Did not qualify
1995	J1	14	14th	52	18	–	31 (0/3)	87	107	−20	57	13,310	–	Semi-final	Did not qualify	Did not qualify
1996	J1	16	12th	30	11	–	19	38	59	21	33	8,004	Group stage	Semi-final	Did not qualify	Did not qualify
1997	J1	17	4th	32	18 (2/0)	–	11 (1/0)	66	46	20	58	8,443	Group stage	Semi-final	Did not qualify	Did not qualify
1998	J1	18	15th	34	7 (4/1)		20 (1/1)	47	61	−14	30	8,723	Group stage	3rd round	Did not qualify	Did not qualify
1999	J1	16	11th	30	9 (2)	1	16 (2)	36	46	−10	32	7,996	2nd round	Round of 16	Did not qualify	Did not qualify
2000	J1	16	6th	30	13 (2)	2	10 (3)	47	43	4	45	9,794	2nd round	Semi-final	Did not qualify	Did not qualify
2001	J1	16	7th	30	12 (2)	2	10 (4)	50	48	2	42	11,723	2nd round	Quarter final	Did not qualify	Did not qualify
2002	J1	16	3rd	30	15 (4)	1	10	59	32	27	54	12,762	Semi-final	Round of 16	Did not qualify	Did not qualify
2003	J1	16	10th	30	10	9	11	50	46	4	39	10,222	Quarter final	Round of 16	Did not qualify	Did not qualify
2004	J1	16	3rd	30	15	6	9	69	48	21	51	12,517	Quarter final	Semi-final	Did not qualify	Did not qualify
2005	J1	18	1st	34	18	6	10	82	58	24	60	15,966	Runners-up	Semi-final	Did not qualify	Did not qualify
2006	J1	18	3rd	34	20	6	8	80	48	32	66	16,259	Quarter final	Runners-up	Group stage	Did not qualify
2007	J1	18	3rd	34	19	10	5	71	37	34	67	17,439	Winners	Semi-final	Did not qualify	Did not qualify
2008	J1	18	8th	34	14	8	12	46	49	−3	50	16,128	Semi-final	Winners	Winners	3rd Place
2009	J1	18	3rd	34	18	6	10	62	44	18	60	17,712	Quarter final	Winners	Round of 16	Did not qualify
2010	J1	18	2nd	34	18	8	8	65	44	21	62	16,654	Quarter final	Semi-final	Round of 16	Did not qualify
2011	J1	18	3rd	34	21	7	6	78	51	27	70	16,411	Semi-final	3rd round	Round of 16	Did not qualify
2012	J1	18	17th	34	9	11	14	67	65	2	38	14,778	Quarter final	Runners-up	Group stage	Did not qualify
2013	J2	22	1st	42	25	12	5	99	46	53	87	12,286	Not eligible	3rd round	Did not qualify	Did not qualify
2014	J1	18	1st	34	19	6	9	59	31	28	63	14,749	Winners	Winners	Did not qualify	Did not qualify
2015	J1	18	2nd	34	18	9	7	56	37	19	63	15,999	Runners-up	Winners	Semi-final	Did not qualify
2016	J1	18	4th	34	17	7	10	53	42	11	58	25,342	Runners-up	Quarter final	Group stage	Did not qualify
2017	J1	18	10th	34	11	10	13	48	41	7	43	24,277	Semi-final	Quarter final	Group stage	Did not qualify
2018	J1	18	9th	34	14	6	14	41	46	−5	48	23,485	Quarter final	2nd round	Did not qualify	Did not qualify
2019	J1	18	7th	34	12	11	11	54	48	6	47	27,708	Semi-final	3rd round	Did not qualify	Did not qualify
2020 †	J1	18	2nd	34	20	5	9	46	42	4	65	7,597	Group stage	Runners-up	Did not qualify	Did not qualify
2021	J1	20	13th	38	12	8	18	33	49	−16	44	5,345	Group stage	Quarter final	Group stage	Did not qualify
2022	J1	18	15th	34	9	10	15	33	44	−11	37	17,669	Group stage	Round of 16	Did not qualify	Did not qualify
2023	J1	18	16th	34	9	7	18	38	61	−23	34	23,273	Quarter-finals	2nd round	Did not qualify	Did not qualify
2024	J1	20	4th	38	18	12	8	49	35	14	66	26,096	2nd round	Runners-up	Did not qualify	Did not qualify
2025	J1	20	9th	38	17	6	15	53	55	-2	57	29,923	3rd round	3rd round	Did not qualify	Did not qualify
2026	J1	10	TBD	18									N/A	N/A		
2026-27	J1	20	TBD	38									TBD	TBD		

Key

- Pos. = Position in league; P = Games played; W = Games won; D = Games drawn; L = Games lost; F = Goals scored; A = Goals conceded; GD = Goals difference; Pts = Points gained
- Attendance = Average home league attendance per game
- † 2020 season attendance reduced by COVID-19 worldwide pandemic.
- Source: J. League Data Site

== Continental record ==
List of clubs that Gamba Osaka has faced outside of Japan in an official match.

Opponent	Season	Home	Away
(Australia) Adelaide United	2008 AFC Champions League Final	3–0	2–0
(Australia) Adelaide United	(Japan) 2008 FIFA Club World Cup Quarter-finals	1–0	
(Australia) Adelaide United	2012 AFC Champions League Group Stage	0–2	0–2
(Australia) Adelaide United	2017 AFC Champions League Group Stage	3–3	3–0
(Australia) Melbourne Victory	2008 AFC Champions League Group Stage	2–0	4–3
(Australia) Melbourne Victory	2011 AFC Champions League Group Stage	5–1	1–1
(Australia) Melbourne Victory	2016 AFC Champions League Group Stage	1–1	1–2
(Australia) Newcastle Jets	2026–27 AFC Champions League Elite League stage	N.A.	3–1
(China) Dalian Shide	2006 AFC Champions League Group Stage	3–0	0–2
(China) Shandong Taishan	2009 AFC Champions League Group Stage	3–0	1–0
(China) Henan Jianye	2010 AFC Champions League Group Stage	1–1	1–1
(China) Tianjin Teda	2011 AFC Champions League Group Stage	2–0	1–2
(China) Guangzhou R&F	2015 AFC Champions League Group Stage	0–2	5–0
(China) Guangzhou Evergrande	2015 AFC Champions League Semi-finals	0–0	1–2
(China) Shanghai Port	2016 AFC Champions League Group Stage	0–2	1–2
(China) Jiangsu Suning	2017 AFC Champions League Group Stage	0–1	0–3
(England) Manchester United	(Japan) 2008 FIFA Club World Cup Semi-finals	3–5	
(Hong Kong) Eastern	2025–26 AFC Champions League Two Group Stage	3–1	5–0
(Indonesia) Sriwijaya	2009 AFC Champions League Group Stage	5–0	3–0
(Japan) Urawa Red Diamonds	2008 AFC Champions League Semi-finals	1–1	3–1
(Japan) Kawasaki Frontale	2009 AFC Champions League Round of 16	2–3	N.A.
(Japan) Cerezo Osaka	2011 AFC Champions League Round of 16	0–1	N.A.
(South Korea) Jeonbuk Hyundai Motors	2006 AFC Champions League Group Stage	1–1	2–3
(South Korea) Jeonbuk Hyundai Motors	2015 AFC Champions League Quarter-finals	3–2	0–0
(South Korea) Jeonbuk Hyundai Motors	2021 AFC Champions League Group Stage	2–2 (Note: Played at a neutral venue.)	1–2
(South Korea) Jeonnam Dragons	2008 AFC Champions League Group Stage	1–1	4–3
(South Korea) FC Seoul	2009 AFC Champions League Group Stage	1–2	4–2
(South Korea) FC Seoul	2015 AFC Champions League Round of 16	3–2	3–1
(South Korea) Suwon Samsung Bluewings	2010 AFC Champions League Group Stage	2–1	0–0
(South Korea) Suwon Samsung Bluewings	2016 AFC Champions League Group Stage	1–2	0–0
(South Korea) Seongnam	2010 AFC Champions League Round of 16	N.A.	0–3
(South Korea) Seongnam	2015 AFC Champions League Group Stage	2–1	0–2
(South Korea) Jeju United	2011 AFC Champions League Group Stage	3–1	1–2
(South Korea) Jeju United	2017 AFC Champions League Group Stage	1–4	0–2
(South Korea) Pohang Steelers	2012 AFC Champions League Group Stage	0–3	0–2
(South Korea) Pohang Steelers	2025–26 AFC Champions League Two Round of 16	2–1	1–1
(South Korea) Gangwon	2026–27 AFC Champions League Elite Preliminary round	N.A.	1–0 (a.e.t.)
(Malaysia) Johor Darul Ta'zim	2017 AFC Champions League Play-off	3–0	N.A.
(Mexico) Pachuca	(Japan) 2008 FIFA Club World Cup Third place	1–0	
(Saudi Arabia) Al-Nassr	2025–26 AFC Champions League Two Final	N.A.	1–0
(Singapore) Warriors	2010 AFC Champions League Group Stage	3–0	4–2
(Singapore) Tampines Rovers	2021 AFC Champions League Group Stage	8–1	2–0
(Syria) Al-Karamah	2008 AFC Champions League Quarter-finals	2–0	2–1
(Thailand) Chonburi	2008 AFC Champions League Group Stage	1–1	2–0
(Thailand) Buriram United	2015 AFC Champions League Group Stage	1–1	2–1
(Thailand) Buriram United	2026–27 AFC Champions League Elite League stage	1–1	N.A.
(Thailand) Chiangrai United	2021 AFC Champions League Group Stage	1–1	1–1
(Thailand) Ratchaburi	2025–26 AFC Champions League Two Group Stage	2–0	2–0
(Thailand) Ratchaburi	2025–26 AFC Champions League Two Quarter-finals	1–1	2–1 (a.e.t.)
(Thailand) Bangkok United	2025–26 AFC Champions League Two Semi-finals	0–1	3–0
(Uzbekistan) Bunyodkor	2012 AFC Champions League Group Stage	3–1	2–3
(Vietnam) SHB Đà Nẵng	2006 AFC Champions League Group Stage	15–0	5–1
(Vietnam) Nam Định	2025–26 AFC Champions League Two Group Stage	3–1	1–0
(Vietnam) Công An Hà Nội	2026–27 AFC Champions League Elite League stage	4–1	N.A.

== Notes ==
Achievements
Preceded by Urawa Red Diamonds (Japan)	Champions of Asia; 2008	Succeeded by Pohang Steelers (South Korea)
