= 2007 D.C. United season =

D.C. United
2007 season
- General manager: Dave Kasper
- Head coach: Tom Soehn
- Stadium: RFK Stadium
- MLS: 1st
- MLS Cup: Quarterfinals
- CONCACAF Champions Cup: Semifinals
- Copa Sudamericana: Round of 16
- SuperLiga: Semifinals
- U.S. Open Cup: Third Round
- Atlantic Cup: Winners
- Top goalscorer: League: Emilio (20); All: Emilio (24)
- Highest home attendance: 45,596 vs. LA Galaxy (9 Aug 2007)
- Average home league attendance: 20,067
Home colors	Away colors

The 2007 D.C. United season was the club's 13th year of existence. It was also their 12th consecutive season in Major League Soccer, the top-tier of professional soccer in the United States and Canada.

The season saw the departure of three-year coach, Piotr Nowak, who became an assistant manager to Bob Bradley for the United States national soccer team. It marked the debut of assistant coach Tom Soehn, becoming promoted to Head Coach duties.

2007 was highlighted as the most successful regular season in the United's history, where the club had a 16-7-7 record; a record strong enough to win their fourth MLS Supporters' Shield. The club became the first club in MLS history to win consecutively win the Shield (United won it in 2006, also). In spite of their record-setting fourth Shield, the United would lose to Chicago Fire 3-2 on aggregate in the MLS Cup Playoffs during the quarterfinals.

Outside of MLS, the United had one of the busiest schedules of tournaments in league history, participating in a total of four tournaments; two domestic and two international. Their international tournaments were highlighted a deep campaign in the CONCACAF Champions League, where the Black-and-Red made a semifinal run, before bowing out to eventual runners-up Guadalajara, 3-2 on aggregate. The United also played Guadalajara in late September in the Copa Sudamericana final stages, where they would fall on a 2-1 aggregate score-line. To date, it was the last time an MLS club played in a South American tournament, which they were invited to as third-place finishers in the 2007 CONCACAF Champions Cup.

The United also participated in the inaugural North American SuperLiga, and had a very brief stint in the U.S. Open Cup. In the SuperLiga, the United would make it to the semifinals before losing to cross-nation rivals, L.A. Galaxy on a 2-0 defeat. They would also lose their first third-round proper in the Open Cup 1-0 to Harrisburg City.

== Club ==
=== 2007 roster ===
Note: Flags indicate national team as defined under FIFA eligibility rules; some limited exceptions apply. Players may hold more than one non-FIFA nationality.

No.	Pos.	Nation	Player
1	GK	USA	Troy Perkins
3	MF	USA	Bryan Arguez
4	DF	USA	Marc Burch
6	DF	USA	Greg Vanney
7	MF	BRA	Fred
8	MF	USA	Justin Moose
9	FW	ANG	Jerson Monteiro
10	MF	ARG	Christian Gómez
11	FW	BRA	Luciano Emilio
12	DF	USA	Domenic Mediate
13	FW	USA	Brad North
14	MF	USA	Ben Olsen
15	MF	RUS	Rod Dyachenko
16	MF	USA	Brian Carroll

No.	Pos.	Nation	Player
17	MF	USA	Joshua Gros
18	DF	USA	Devon McTavish
19	MF	USA	Clyde Simms
20	FW	CIV	Guy-Roland Kpene
21	MF	JAM	Stephen deRoux
22	GK	USA	Jay Nolly
23	FW	USA	Jamil Walker
24	MF	USA	Jeff Carroll
25	FW	USA	Mira Mupier
26	DF	USA	Bryan Namoff
32	DF	USA	Bobby Boswell
33	FW	JAM	Nicholas Addlery
40	GK	USA	Shawn Crowe
99	FW	BOL	Jaime Moreno

== Standings ==
=== Major League Soccer ===
D.C. United's twelfth season in Major League Soccer began on March 27 and ended on October 23, 2007. United finished in first place in both the Eastern Conference and the overall standings, clinching their second-consecutive Supporters' Shield.

Eastern Conference table

Eastern Conference
Pos	Club	Pts	GP	W	L	T	GF	GA	GD
1	D.C. United	55	30	16	7	7	56	34	22
2	New England Revolution	50	30	14	8	8	51	43	8
3	New York Red Bulls	43	30	12	11	7	47	45	2
4	Chicago Fire	40	30	10	10	10	31	36	-5
5	Kansas City Wizards	40	30	11	12	7	45	45	0
6	Columbus Crew	37	30	9	11	10	39	44	-5
7	Toronto FC	25	30	6	17	7	25	49	-24

Overall table

Pos	Club	Pts	GP	W	L	T	GF	GA	GD
1	D.C. United (E1)	55	30	16	7	7	56	34	22
2	Chivas USA (W1)	53	30	15	7	8	46	28	18
3	Houston Dynamo (W2)	52	30	15	8	7	43	23	20
4	New England Revolution (E2)	50	30	14	8	8	51	43	8
5	FC Dallas	44	30	13	12	5	37	44	-7
6	New York Red Bulls	43	30	12	11	7	47	45	2
7	Chicago Fire	40	30	10	10	10	31	36	-5
8	Kansas City Wizards	40	30	11	12	7	45	45	0
9	Columbus Crew	37	30	9	11	10	39	44	-5
10	Colorado Rapids	35	30	9	13	8	29	34	-5
11	Los Angeles Galaxy	34	30	9	14	7	38	48	-10
12	Real Salt Lake	27	30	6	15	9	31	45	-14
13	Toronto FC	25	30	6	17	7	25	49	-24

MLS Supporters' Shield, 2007 MLS Cup Playoffs, CONCACAF Champions' Cup 2008, SuperLiga 2008, CONCACAF Champions League 2008-09
2007 MLS Cup Playoffs, SuperLiga 2008, CONCACAF Champions League 2008–09
2007 MLS Cup Playoffs, SuperLiga 2008
2007 MLS Cup Playoffs

- ^2 - Toronto FC cannot qualify for the CONCACAF Champions League through MLS. Rather, they can qualify through the Canadian Championship.
  If they had qualified for the Champions League through MLS, then the highest placed team not already qualified would have qualified.
- ^3 - Additional Champions League berths were awarded to the winner (Houston) and runner-up (New England) of MLS Cup 2007.
  The winner of the 2007 U.S. Open Cup (New England) also qualified.
  Because New England qualified twice, an additional berth was awarded to the 2007 MLS Supporters' Shield runner-up (Chivas USA).

==== Results summary ====
Overall								Home						Away					
Pld	Pts	W	L	T	GF	GA	GD	W	L	T	GF	GA	GD	W	L	T	GF	GA	GD
30	55	16	7	7	56	34	+22	10	2	3	37	22	+15	6	5	4	19	12	+7

Last updated: January 12, 2011
Source: ESPNSoccernet.com
Pld = Matches played; Pts = Points; W = Matches won; T = Matches tied; L = Matches lost; GF = Goals for; GA = Goals against; GD = Goal difference

==== Results by round ====
Round	1	2	3	4	5	6	7	8	9	10	11	12	13	14	15	16	17	18	19	20	21	22	23	24	25	26	27	28	29	30
Stadium	A	H	A	H	H	A	H	A	H	H	A	H	A	A	A	A	A	H	A	H	A	A	H	A	A	H	A	H	A	H
Result	L	L	L	D	W	W	W	D	W	W	L	W	W	L	D	L	W	W	W	W	W	W	D	W	W	D	W	D	D	L
Position	8	9	13	13	13	11	11	12	11	9	10	8	6	7	9	10	8	6	5	3	3	2	3	2	2	1	1	1	1	1

Source: MLS Results and League table
A = Away; H = Home; W = Win; D = Draw; L = Loss

=== North American SuperLiga ===
Group B

Team	Pts	GP	W	D	L	GF	GA	GD
(United States) Houston Dynamo	7	3	2	1	0	3	1	+2
(United States) D.C. United	4	3	1	1	1	2	2	0
(Mexico) Club América	3	3	1	0	2	3	4	-1
(Mexico) Monarcas Morelia	2	3	0	2	1	4	5	-1

== Match reports ==
=== Major League Soccer ===
April 7, 2007 Week 1	Colorado	2–1	D.C. United	Commerce City
	Beckerman (yellow card) 9'; Gomez 19'; Brown 35'; Petke (yellow card) 49'	Report	(yellow card) 10' Olsen; (yellow card) 34' Moreno; 79' Emilio	Stadium: DSG Park; Attendance: 18,086

April 14, 2007 Week 2	D.C. United	2–4	Kansas City	Washington, D.C.
	Emilio 11'; Gomez 34' (yellow card) 90'	Report	3' Harrington; 8' (yellow card) 33' Victorine; (yellow card) 38' Hohlbein; 45' Johnson; 54' Sealy; (yellow card) 64' Burciaga Jr.	Stadium: RFK Stadium

April 28, 2007 Week 3	Columbus	1–0	D.C. United	Columbus
				Stadium: Crew Stadium

May 3, 2007 Week 4	D.C. United	1–1	New England	Washington, D.C.
				Stadium: RFK Stadium; Attendance: 18,407

May 6, 2007 Week 5	D.C. United	2–1	Chivas USA	Washington, D.C.
				Stadium: RFK Stadium

May 19, 2007 Week 6	Toronto	1–2	D.C. United	Toronto
				Stadium: BMO Field

May 26, 2007 Week 7	D.C. United	2–1	Houston	Washington, D.C.
	Gómez 4'; Olsen 27'	Report	27' De Rosario	Stadium: RFK Stadium

June 2, 2007 Week 8	L.A. Galaxy	0–0	D.C. United	Carson
		Report		Stadium: The Home Depot Center; Attendance: 13,570

June 10, 2007 Week 9	D.C. United	4–2	New York	Washington, D.C.
				Stadium: RFK Stadium

June 16, 2007 Week 10	D.C. United	3–1	Chicago	Washington, D.C.
				Stadium: RFK Stadium

June 23, 2007 Week 11	Real Salt Lake	2–1	D.C. United	Salt Lake City
		Report		Stadium: Rice-Eccles Stadium

June 28, 2007 Week 12	D.C. United	4–1	Colorado	Washington, D.C.
19:00 EDT	Gomez 34' (pen.); Addlery 71'; Fred 82'; Emilio 87'	Report	19' Peterson	Stadium: RFK Stadium

July 4, 2007 Week 13	Kansas City	0–1	D.C. United	Kansas City
12:00 EDT		Report	44' Emilio	Stadium: Arrowhead Stadium

July 8, 2007 Week 14	Houston	1–0	D.C. United	Houston
19:30 EDT	Ching 33'	Report		Stadium: Robertson Stadium

July 14, 2007 Week 15	D.C. United	3–3	FC Dallas	Washington, D.C.
19:30 EDT	Emilio 8', 47'; Fred 45'	Report	51' Ruiz; 71', 81' Toja	Stadium: RFK Stadium

July 22, 2007 Week 16	New York	1–0	D.C. United	East Rutherford
17:00 EDT	Wolyniec 19'	Report		Stadium: Giants Stadium

August 5, 2007 Week 17	New England	1–3	D.C. United	Foxboro
	Najar 54'	Report	Gros 22'; Emilio 31', 76'	Stadium: Gillette Stadium

August 9, 2007 Week 18	D.C. United	1–0	L.A. Galaxy	Washington, D.C.
14:00 EDT	Emilio 27'	Report		Stadium: RFK Stadium; Attendance: 46,686

August 18, 2007 Week 19	Columbus	0–2	D.C. United	Columbus
		Report		Stadium: Crew Stadium

August 22, 2010 Week 20	D.C. United	3–1	New York	Washington, D.C.
19:30 EDT	Olsen 6'; Gomez 8'; Fred (yellow card) 30'; Moreno 48' (pen.); Burch (yellow card) 71'	Report	21' (pen.) Ángel; (yellow card) 37' Richards	Stadium: RFK Stadium

August 25, 2007 Week 21	Toronto FC	0–1	D.C. United	Toronto
19:30 EDT		Report	8' Fred	Stadium: BMO Field; Attendance: 18,865

September 1, 2007 Week 22	FC Dallas	0–4	D.C. United	Frisco
19:30 EDT	Goodson (yellow card) 58'; Denilson (yellow card) 77'	Report	4', 45' Olsen; (yellow card) 25' Simms; 47' Gomez; 49' Fred; Moreno (yellow card) 78'	Stadium: Pizza Hut Park

September 6, 2007 Week 23	Chivas USA	2–2	D.C. United	Carson
22:30 EDT	Razov 31'; Vaughn 60'	Report	3', 26' Emilio; (yellow card) 33' Namoff; (yellow card) 54' Burch; Vanney (yellow card) 69'	Stadium: The Home Depot Center

September 9, 2007 Week 24	D.C. United	4–2	New England	Washington, D.C.
15:00 EDT		Report		Stadium: RFK Stadium

September 12, 2007 Week 25	D.C. United	2–1	Real Salt Lake	Washington, D.C.
19:30 EDT		Report		Stadium: RFK Stadium

September 23, 2007 Week 26	Chicago	1–1	D.C. United	Bridgeview
15:00 EDT		Report		Stadium: Toyota Park

September 29, 2007 Week 27	D.C. United	4–1	Toronto FC	Washington, D.C.
19:30 EDT		Report		Stadium: RFK Stadium

October 5, 2007 Week 28	Kansas City	1–1	D.C. United	Kansas City
19:00 EDT		Report		Stadium: Arrowhead Stadium

October 13, 2007 Week 29	D.C. United	0–0	Chicago Fire	Washington, D.C.
4:00 PM EDT		Report		Stadium: RFK Stadium

October 20, 2007 Week 30	D.C. United	2–3	Columbus	Washington, D.C.
19:00 EDT		Report		Stadium: RFK Stadium

=== MLS Cup Playoffs ===
==== Conference semifinals ====
October 25, 2007 First leg	Chicago Fire	1–0	D.C. United	Bridgeview
18:30 EDT		Report		Stadium: Toyota Park

November 1, 2007 Second leg	D.C. United	2–2 (2–3 agg.)	Chicago Fire	Washington, D.C.
19:30 EDT		Report		Stadium: RFK Stadium

=== CONCACAF Champions Cup ===
==== Quarterfinals ====
February 21, 2007 First leg	Olimpia (Honduras)	1–4	(United States) D.C. United	Tegucigalpa, Honduras
21:00 EDT	Cárcamo 34'	Report	31', 59' Gómez; 45' Emilio; 84' Erpen	Stadium: Estadio Andino; Referee: (Mexico) Jorge Gasso

March 3, 2007 Second leg	D.C. United (United States)	3–2 (7–3 agg.)	(Honduras) Olimpia	Washington, D.C., United States
	Emilio 37', 84'; Gómez 49' (pen.)	Report	Thomas 30' (pen); Pacini 75'	Stadium: RFK Stadium; Attendance: 8,181; Referee: (Canada) Mauricio Navarro

==== Semifinals ====
March 15, 2007 First leg	D.C. United (United States)	1–1	(Mexico) Guadalajara	Washington, D.C., United States
20:00 EDT	Emilio 90+1'	Report	63' Bravo	Stadium: RFK Stadium; Attendance: 26,528; Referee: (Canada) Silviu Petrescu

April 3, 2007 Second leg	Guadalajara (Mexico)	2–1 (3–2 agg.)	(United States) D.C. United	Guadalajara, Mexico
21:30 EDT	Bautista 42'; Pineda 56'	Report	36' Moreno	Stadium: Estadio Jalisco; Attendance: 30,000; Referee: (Panama) Roberto Moreno

=== Copa Sudamericana ===
==== First round ====
September 26, 2007 First leg	D.C. United (United States)	2–1	(Mexico) Guadalajara	Washington, D.C., United States
19:45 EDT	Olsen 23'; Simms 54'	Report	60' Santana	Stadium: RFK Stadium; Attendance: 21,022; Referee: (Argentina) Héctor Baldassi

October 2, 2007 Second leg	Guadalajara (Mexico)	1–0 (2–2 a agg.)	(United States) D.C. United	Guadalajara, Mexico
20:15 EDT	Morales 63'	Report		Stadium: Estadio Jalisco; Attendance: 27,403; Referee: (Ecuador) Samuel Haro

=== North American SuperLiga ===
==== Group stage ====
July 25, 2007 GS	D.C. United (United States)	1–1	(Mexico) Morelia	Washington, D.C., United States
20:00 EDT	Gómez 7'	Report	(red card) 58' Landín; 79' Martínez	Stadium: RFK Stadium; Attendance: 13,335; Referee: Courtney Campbell (Jamaica)

July 29, 2007 GS	D.C. United (United States)	1–0	(Mexico) América	Washington, D.C., United States
20:00 EDT	Dyachenko 63'	Report		Stadium: RFK Stadium; Attendance: 18,604; Referee: Carlos Batres (Guatemala)

August 1, 2007 GS	Houston Dynamo (United States)	1–0	(United States) D.C. United	Houston, United States
20:00 EDT	Ching 50'	Report		Stadium: Robertson Stadium; Attendance: 11,013; Referee: Baldomero Toledo (United States)

==== Quarterfinals ====
August 15, 2007 SF	Los Angeles Galaxy (United States)	2–0	(United States) D.C. United	Carson, United States
23:00 EDT	Ching 50'	Report		Stadium: The Home Depot Center; Attendance: 11,013; Referee: Alex Prus (Canada)

=== U.S. Open Cup ===
July 11, 2007 3rd Rd	D.C. United (Washington, D.C.)	0–1	(Pennsylvania) Harrisburg City	Landisville, PA
19:30 EDT		(Report)	44' Fisher	Stadium: HHS Stadium; Attendance: 5,219; Referee: Jeff Gonerik

== Kits ==
Home	Away	Special

Type	Shirt	Shorts	Socks	First appearance / Info
Home	Black	Black	Black	
Away	White	White	White	
Special	Maroon	White	White	MLS, April 28 against Columbus → Virginia Tech Memorial Kit
