= Brian Carroll =

American soccer player

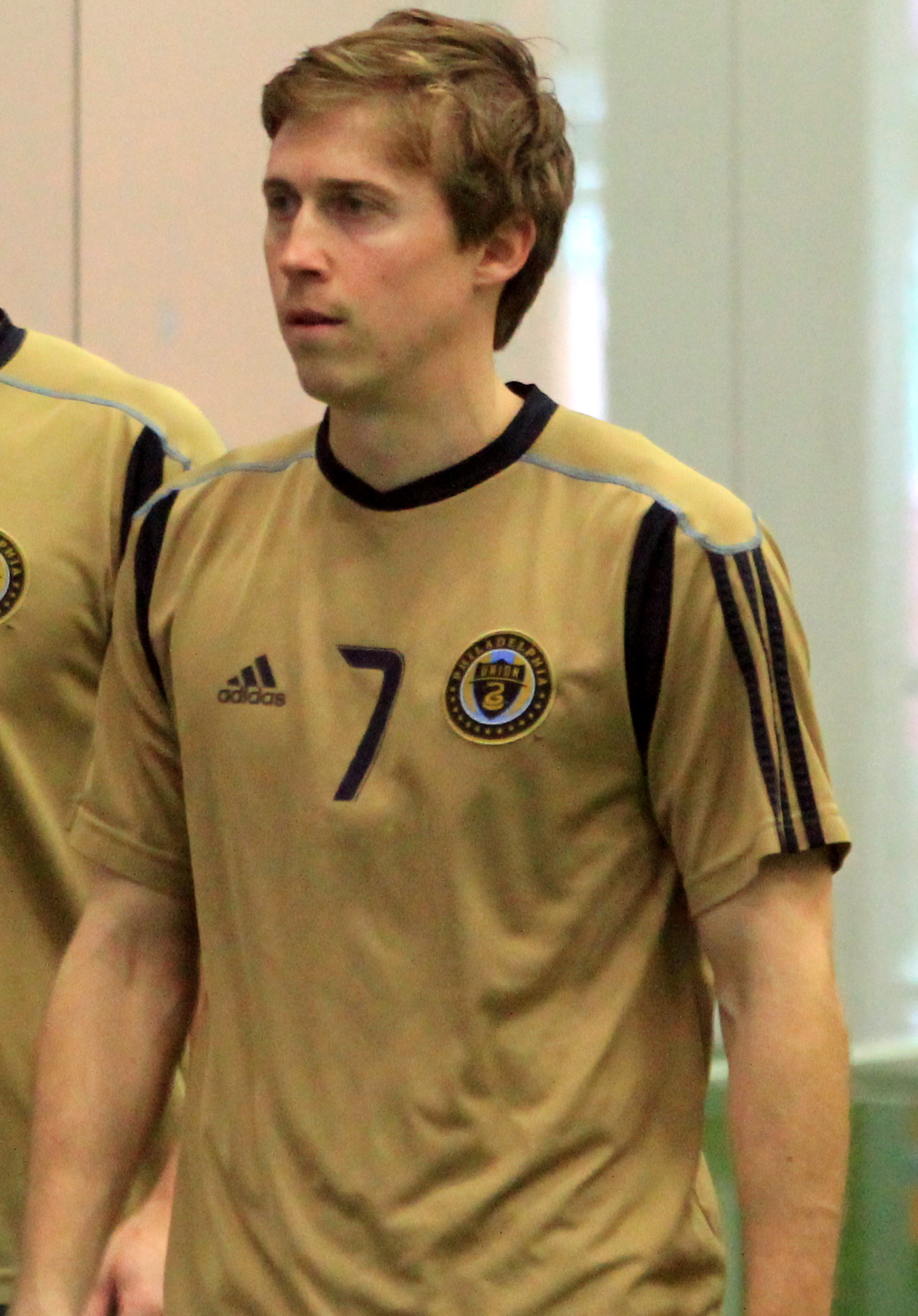
- Carroll with the Philadelphia Union in 2011

Personal information
- Date of birth: July 20, 1981 (age 45)
- Place of birth: Fairfax, Virginia, U.S.
- Height: 1.78 m (5 ft 10 in)
- Position: Defensive midfielder

Youth career
- 2000–2002: Wake Forest Demon Deacons

Senior career*
Years	Team	Apps	(Gls)
2003–2007	D.C. United	121	(2)
2003	→ Richmond Kickers (loan)	8	(0)
2008–2010	Columbus Crew	84	(2)
2011–2017	Philadelphia Union	166	(5)
2017	→ Bethlehem Steel (loan)	1	(0)
Total		380	(9)

International career
2001	United States U20	3	(0)
2005–2009	United States	8	(0)
- * Club domestic league appearances and goals

Brian Carroll (born July 20, 1981) is an American former professional soccer player who played as a defensive midfielder, notably appearing for D.C. United Columbus Crew and Philadelphia Union in Major League Soccer. He is the only player in MLS history to have won four consecutive Supporter Shields.

== Youth and college career ==
While in high school, Carroll was the Washington Post All-Met Player of the Year, was twice named to the Parade All-American team, and led the West Springfield Spartans to the final of the Virginia state tournament in 1998. He played college soccer at Wake Forest University from 2000 to 2002. Named captain as a sophomore, Carroll tied the school record for most assists in a game with three and finished the year as a second-team All-ACC selection. As a junior, he was again team captain, an All-American, and was a finalist for the Hermann Trophy. After his junior year, he signed a Project-40 contract with MLS, completing his career at Wake Forest with 7 goals and 15 assists, having started all 61 games over the three years.

== Club career ==
=== D.C. United ===
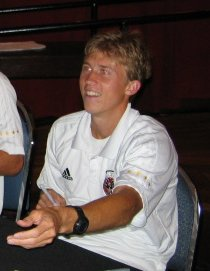
Carroll at a D.C. United Meet the Team event, July 17, 2005

Carroll was selected 11th overall in the 2003 MLS SuperDraft by D.C. United. Unfortunately for him, coach Ray Hudson preferred a lineup dominated by veterans, and although he saw time in U.S. Open Cup competition, Carroll did not appear in any regular season games. Peter Nowak replaced Hudson following the 2003 season, and soon expressed incredulity that a player as talented as Carroll saw no playing time under Hudson. Carroll was a fixture in Nowak's lineup for the first game of the 2004 season, and would remain there all year long, appearing in all 30 of the team's games, starting 26 of them, earning his first MLS assist, and winning the MLS Cup. In 2005, he led the team in minutes and games played, scored his first league goal, added three more assists, and led MLS in consecutive games played, at 62. Carroll was one of three players nominated for the 2005 MLS Fair Play Award. Carroll started 31 games for the club in 2006, with 1 goal and 3 assists. Carroll lost his starting role with United to fellow defensive midfielder Clyde Simms midway through the 2007 season, but still had a productive year, with 4 assists to his credit. It was announced on 27 November 2006 that Carroll was on trial with French club Olympique de Marseille with hopes for an eventual transfer. However, on 23 January 2007 it was announced that Carroll had re-signed with D.C. United.

=== Columbus Crew ===
On November 21, 2007, Carroll was selected as part of the expansion draft to join the new San Jose Earthquakes club. On November 26, he was traded to the Columbus Crew in exchange for Kei Kamara.

In June 2010, Caroll signed a four-year contract extension with the Crew. On November 6, 2010, he missed the penalty which ended the Crew's playoff run, sending the ball over the crossbar.

=== Philadelphia Union ===
On November 22, 2010, Carroll was traded to Philadelphia Union in exchange for a second-round draft pick and allocation money.

Between 2004 and 2016 he made at least 21 appearances for 13 different seasons. Upon retirement he was praised for his professionalism and leadership.

== International career ==
Carroll played on the Under-18, Under-20, and Under-23 national teams, including at the 2001 FIFA World Youth Championship in Argentina and 2003 Olympic Qualifying. In his first game for the full national team (a World Cup qualifier vs. Panama on October 12, 2005), he was named Man of the Match. He ended his career with eight caps.

== Personal life ==
Carroll is the brother of fellow former professional soccer players Jeff Carroll and Pat Carroll, both of whom have also played for D.C. United. He is a lifelong Catholic whose soccer career has been influenced by former UCLA basketball coach John Wooden.

Following retirement Carroll was planning to move to the Indianapolis area to pursue a career in financial planning.

== Career statistics ==
=== Club ===
As of April 16, 2016

Appearances and goals by club, season and competition
Club	Season	League			Open Cup		Playoffs		North America		Total	
Club	Season	Division	Apps	Goals	Apps	Goals	Apps	Goals	Apps	Goals	Apps	Goals
D.C. United	2003	Major League Soccer	0	0	3	0	0	0	0	0	3	0
D.C. United	2004	Major League Soccer	30	0	1	0	4	0	0	0	35	0
D.C. United	2005	Major League Soccer	32	1	2	0	2	0	0	0	36	1
D.C. United	2006	Major League Soccer	31	1	3	0	3	0	0	0	37	1
D.C. United	2007	Major League Soccer	28	0	1	0	1	0	0	0	30	0
Columbus Crew	2008	Major League Soccer	30	1	2	0	4	0	0	0	36	1
Columbus Crew	2009	Major League Soccer	26	0	0	0	2	0	5	0	33	0
Columbus Crew	2010	Major League Soccer	28	1	1	0	2	0	3	0	34	1
Philadelphia Union	2011	Major League Soccer	30	1	1	1	2	0	0	0	33	2
Philadelphia Union	2012	Major League Soccer	33	1	4	1	0	0	0	0	37	2
Philadelphia Union	2013	Major League Soccer	33	2	2	1	0	0	0	0	35	3
Philadelphia Union	2014	Major League Soccer	21	0	3	0	0	0	0	0	24	0
Philadelphia Union	2015	Major League Soccer	22	0	3	0	0	0	0	0	25	0
Philadelphia Union	2016	Major League Soccer	5	0	0	0	0	0	0	0	5	0
Career total			349	8	26	3	20	0	8	0	403	11

=== International ===
Appearances and goals by national team and year
National team	Year	Apps	Goals
United States	2005	2	0
United States	2006	2	0
United States	2007	2	0
United States	2008	0	0
United States	2009	1	0
United States	2010	1	0
Total		8	0

== Honors ==
D.C. United

- MLS Cup: 2004
- Eastern Conference (Playoffs): 2004
- Supporter's Shield: 2006, 2007

Columbus Crew

- MLS Cup: 2008
- Eastern Conference (Playoffs): 2008
- Supporter's Shield: 2008, 2009
