= 2007 Copa Sudamericana final stages =

Following is the list of 2007 Copa Sudamericana final stages.

The 2007 edition of the Copa Sudamericana was played by 34 teams; 30 teams from the CONMEBOL and 4 teams from the CONCACAF. CONMEBOL organized the tournament and invited three North American clubs which were the best three of the CONCACAF Champions' Cup 2007; the fourth North American club was the defending champion Pachuca. The official draw took place on 22 May in Buenos Aires.

== Round of 16 ==
=== First leg ===
19 September 2007
17:15

Goiás (Brazil)	2–3	(Argentina) Arsenal
Baier 25', 76'	(Report)	Damonte 16'; Casteglione 78'; Garnier 79'

Serra Dourada, Goiânia
Attendance: 10,416
Referee: Amarilla (Paraguay)

19 September 2007
19:30

Botafogo (Brazil)	1–0	(Argentina) River Plate
Joilson 44'	(Report)

Engenhão, Rio de Janeiro
Attendance: 39,500
Referee: Ruiz (Colombia)

19 September 2007
21:45

Boca Juniors (Argentina)	2–1	(Brazil) São Paulo
Palermo 26', 83'	(Report)	Borges 89'

Alberto J. Armando, Buenos Aires
Attendance: 24,790
Referee: Larrionda (Uruguay)

19 September 2007
21:45

Lanús (Argentina)	2–0	(Brazil) Vasco da Gama
Pelletieri 32'; Sand 77'	(Report)

Ciudad de Lanús Néstor Díaz Pérez, Buenos Aires
Attendance: 6,112
Referee: Chandía (Chile)

20 September 2007
21:15

Defensor Sporting (Uruguay)	3–0	(Ecuador) El Nacional
De Souza 14'; González 64'; De Souza 90' (pen.)	(Report)

Centenario, Montevideo
Attendance: 14,368
Referee: Pozo (Chile)

25 September 2007
19:00

Millonarios (Colombia)	1–1	(Chile) Colo-Colo
Ciciliano 66'	(Report)	Rubio 30'

Nemesio Camacho, Bogotá
Attendance: 28,819
Referee: Rivera (Peru)

25 September 2007
21:15

Pachuca (Mexico)	1–4	(Mexico) América
Giménez 39'	(Report)	Insúa 33'; Cabañas 47'; López 56', 57'

Hidalgo, Pachuca
Attendance: 9,765
Referee: Rodríguez (Mexico)

26 September 2007
20:45

D.C. United (United States)	2–1	(Mexico) Guadalajara
Olsen 23'; Simms 54'	(Report)	Santana 60'

RFK Stadium, Washington, D.C.
Attendance: 21,022
Referee: Baldassi (Argentina)

=== Second leg ===
26 September 2007
19:15

Arsenal (Argentina)	1–1	(Brazil) Goiás
Gómez 36'	(Report)	Harison 45+'

Julio Humberto Grondona, Avellaneda
Attendance: 3,424
Referee: Selman (Chile)

Arsenal won 3–2 on aggregate.

26 September 2007
21:45

Vasco da Gama (Brazil)	3–0	(Argentina) Lanús
Leandro Amaral 29', 90'; Wagner Diniz 75'	(Report)

São Januário, Rio de Janeiro
Attendance: 2,739
Referee: Larrionda (Uruguay)

Vasco da Gama won 3–2 on aggregate.

2007-09-26
21:45

São Paulo FC (Brazil)	1–0	(Argentina) Boca Juniors
Aloísio 53'	(Report)

Morumbí, São Paulo
Attendance: 45,906
Referee: Chandía (Chile)

2–2 on aggregate. São Paulo won on away goals.

27 September 2007
20:15

River Plate (Argentina)	4–2	(Brazil) Botafogo
Falcao 31', 74', 90+2'; Ríos 80'	(Report)	Lúcio Flávio 11'; Dodô 65'

Monumental de Nuñez, Buenos Aires
Attendance: 20,708
Referee: Amarilla (Paraguay)

River Plate won 4–3 on aggregate.

2 October 2007
20:15

Guadalajara (Mexico)	1–0	(United States) D.C. United
Morales 63'	(Report)

Jalisco, Guadalajara
Referee: Haro (Ecuador)

2–2 on aggregate. Guadalajara won on away goals.

3 October 2007
21:15

América (Mexico)	0–2	(Mexico) Pachuca
	(Report)	Álvarez 57'; Giménez 59'

Azteca, Mexico City
Attendance: 44,477
Referee: Glower (Mexico)

América won 4–3 on aggregate.

4 October 2007
18:00

(Ecuador) El Nacional	2–0	Defensor Sporting (Uruguay)
Ordoñez 15', 35'	(Report)

Atahualpa, Quito
Attendance: 2029
Referee: Rivera (Peru)

Defensor won 3–2 on aggregate.

4 October 2007
21:30

(Chile) Colo-Colo	1–1	Millonarios (Colombia)
Biscayzacú 41'	(Report)	Mosquera 37'
Penalties
Cereceda (penalty scored); Biscayzacú (penalty scored); Millar (penalty scored); Mena (penalty scored); Fierro (penalty scored); Bieler (penalty scored); Sanhueza (penalty missed)	6–7	(penalty scored) Ricardo Ciciliano; (penalty scored) Bedoya; (penalty scored) Martínez; (penalty scored) Villagra; (penalty scored) Quintero; (penalty scored) Mosquera; (penalty scored) Estrada

Monumental David Arellano, Santiago
Attendance: 18164
Referee: Baldassi (Argentina)

2–2 on aggregate. Millonarios won 7–6 on penalties.

== Quarter-finals ==
=== First legs ===
10 October 2007
19:50

América (Mexico)	2–0	(Brazil) Vasco da Gama
Davino 51'; H.R. López 77'	Report

Azteca, Mexico City
Attendance: 35,600
Referee: Vázquez (Uruguay)

10 October 2007
21:50

São Paulo (Brazil)	0–1	(Colombia) Millonarios
	Report	L.E. Zapata 84'

Morumbí, São Paulo
Attendance: 6,522
Referee: Pezzotta (Argentina)

25 October 2007
21:00

Defensor Sporting (Uruguay)	2–2	(Argentina) River Plate
Gaglianone 14'; Valenti 84'	Report	Ortega 5' (pen.); Falcao 30'

Centenario, Montevideo
Attendance: 36,838
Referee: Fagundes (Brazil)

10 October 2007
19:30

Arsenal (Argentina)	0–0	(Mexico) Guadalajara
	Report

Julio Humberto Grondona, Avellaneda
Attendance: 2,640
Referee: Grance (Paraguay)

=== Second legs ===
24 October 2007
21:50

Vasco da Gama (Brazil)	1–0	(Mexico) América
Leandro Amaral 10'	Report

São Januário, Rio de Janeiro
Attendance: 1,312
Referee: Amarilla (Paraguay)

América won 2–1 on aggregate.

24 October 2007
18:50

Millonarios (Colombia)	2–0	(Brazil) São Paulo
Ciciliano 76', 85'	Report

Nemesio Camacho, Bogotá
Attendance: 39,454
Referee: Vázquez (Uruguay)

Millonarios won 3–0 on aggregate.

30 October 2007
21:15

River Plate (Argentina)	0–0	(Uruguay) Defensor Sporting
	Report

Monumental de Nuñez, Buenos Aires
Attendance: 35,021
Referee: Grance (Paraguay)

River Plate 2–2 Defensor on aggregate. River Plate won on away goals.

25 October 2007
20:30

Guadalajara (Mexico)	1–3	(Argentina) Arsenal
S. Santana 16'	Report	Yacuzzi 2', 27'; Raymonda 78' (pen.)

Jalisco, Guadalajara
Attendance: 19,980
Referee: Ruiz (Colombia)

Arsenal won 3–1 on aggregate.

== Semi-finals ==
8 November 2007
21:15

(Argentina) Arsenal	0–0	(Argentina) River Plate
	(Report)

Julio Humberto Grondona, Sarandí
Attendance: 8,929
Referee: Pezzotta (Argentina)

14 November 2007
21:30

(Argentina) River Plate	0–0	(Argentina) Arsenal
	(Report)
Penalties
Belluschi (penalty missed); R. Zárate (penalty scored); P. Ferrari (penalty scored); R. Lima (penalty missed)	2–4	(penalty scored) Calderón; (penalty missed) Andrizzi; (penalty scored) Yacuzzi; (penalty scored) Casteglione; (penalty scored) Cuenca

Monumental Antonio Vespucio Liberti, Buenos Aires
Referee: Baldassi (Argentina)

0–0 on aggregate. Arsenal won 4–2 on penalties.

7 November 2007
Leg 1

Millonarios (Colombia)	2–3	(Mexico) Club America
Gerardo Bedoya 61'; Jonathan Estrada 69'		German Villa 25'; Salvador Cabanas 37' 84'

Estadio El Campin, Bogota, Colombia

13 November 2007
Leg 2

Club America (Mexico)	2–0	(Colombia) Millonarios
Rodrigo Lopez 7' 80'

Estadio Nemesio Diez, Toluca, Mexico

America won 5-2 on aggregate.

== Finals ==
Copa Sudamericana
2007 Champion

Arsenal de Sarandí
First Title
