= 2007 in American soccer =

Soccer in the United States
- Season: 2007

Men's soccer
- Supporters' Shield: D.C. United
- USL First Division: Seattle Sounders
- USL Second Division: Harrisburg City Islanders
- NPSL: Southern California Fusion
- PDL: Laredo Heat
- US Open Cup: New England Revolution
- MLS Cup: Houston Dynamo

The 2007 season was the 95th year of competitive soccer in the United States.

== National team ==
=== Men ===
==== Senior ====
Wins	Losses	Draws
12	5	1

The home team or the team that is designated as the home team is listed in the left column; the away team is in the right column.

Win Draw Loss

January 20 International Friendly	United States	3–1	Denmark	Carson, California
14:00 UTC−08	Donovan 44' (pen.); Bornstein 57'; Cooper 80'	(Report)	Sørensen 37'	Stadium: Home Depot Center; Attendance: 10,048; Referee: Mauricio Navarro (Canada)

February 7 International Friendly	United States	2–0	Mexico	Glendale, Arizona
19:25 UTC−07	Conrad 52'; Donovan 90+1'	(Report)		Stadium: University of Phoenix Stadium; Attendance: 62,462; Referee: Mauricio Navarro (Canada)

March 25 International Friendly	United States	3–1	Ecuador	Tampa, Florida
12:00 UTC−04	Donovan 1', 66', 67'	(Report)	Caicedo 11'	Stadium: Raymond James Stadium; Attendance: 31,547; Referee: Silviu Petrescu (Canada)

March 28 International Friendly	United States	0–0	Guatemala	Frisco, Texas
20:00 UTC−05		(Report)		Stadium: Pizza Hut Park; Attendance: 10,932; Referee: Benito Archundia (Mexico)

June 2 International Friendly	United States	4–1	China	San Jose, California
17:00 UTC−07	Beasley 10'; Feilhaber 28'; Dempsey 72'; Onyewu 79'	(Report)	Yaokun 15'	Stadium: Spartan Stadium; Attendance: 20,821; Referee: Hugo Gualaro (Mexico)

June 7 Gold Cup group stage	United States	1–0	Guatemala	Carson, California
18:00 UTC−07	Dempsey 26'	(Report)		Stadium: Home Depot Center; Attendance: 21,334; Referee: Jose Pineda (Honduras)

June 9 Gold Cup group stage	Trinidad and Tobago	0–2	United States	Carson, California
14:00 UTC−07		(Report)	Ching 29'; Johnson 54'	Stadium: Home Depot Center; Attendance: 27,000; Referee: Robert Moreno (Panama)

June 12 Gold Cup group stage	United States	4–0	El Salvador	Foxborough, Massachusetts
17:00 UTC−04	Beasley 34', 89'; Donovan 49' (pen.); Twellman 73'	(Report)		Stadium: Gillette Stadium; Attendance: 26,523; Referee: Benito Archundia (Mexico)

June 16 Gold Cup Quarterfinal	United States	2–1	Panama	Foxborough, Massachusetts
16:00 UTC−04	Donovan 60' (pen.); Bocanegra 62'	(Report)	Pérez 85'	Stadium: Gillette Stadium; Attendance: 22,412; Referee: Neal Brizan (Trinidad & Tobago)

June 21 Gold Cup Semifinal	Canada	1–2	United States	Chicago
18:00 UTC−05	Hume 76'	(Report)	Hejduk 39'; Donovan 45'	Stadium: Soldier Field; Attendance: 50,760; Referee: Benito Archundio (Mexico)

June 24 Gold Cup Final	United States	2–1	Mexico	Chicago
14:00 UTC−05	Donovan 62' (pen.); Feilhaber 73'	(Report)	Guardado 44'	Stadium: Soldier Field; Attendance: 60,000; Referee: Carlos Batres (Guatemala)

June 28 Copa América group stage	Argentina	4–1	United States	Maracaibo, Venezuela
20:50 UTC−04:30	Crespo 11' 60'; Aimar 76'; Tevez 84'	(Report)	Johnson 9' (pen.)	Stadium: Estadio José Pachencho Romero; Attendance: 34,500; Referee: Carlos Chandía (Chile)

July 2 Copa América group stage	United States	1–3	Paraguay	Barinas, Venezuela
18:35 UTC−04:30	Clark 35'	(Report)	Barreto 29'; Cardozo 56'; Cabañas 90+2'	Stadium: Estadio Agustín Tovar; Attendance: 28,200; Referee: Carlos Chandía (Chile)

July 5 Copa América group stage	United States	0–1	Colombia	Barquisimeto, Venezuela
18:35 UTC−04:30		(Report)	Castrillón 15'	Stadium: Estadio Metropolitano de Fútbol de Lara; Attendance: 37,500; Referee: Manuel Andarcia (Venezuela)

August 22 International Friendly	Sweden	1–0	United States	Gothenburg, Sweden
19:30 UTC+02	Kallstrom 56'	(Report)		Stadium: Ullevi; Attendance: 20,648; Referee: Kevin Blom (Netherlands)

September 9 International Friendly	United States	2–4	Brazil	Chicago
16:00 UTC-05	Bocanegra 21'; Dempsey 73'	(Report)	Onyewu 33' (o.g.); Lucio 53'; Ronaldinho 75'; Elano 90+2' (pen.)	Stadium: Soldier Field; Attendance: 43,543; Referee: Armando Archulia (Mexico)

October 17 International Friendly	Switzerland	0–1	United States	Basel, Switzerland
20:30 UTC+02		(Report)	86' Bradley	Stadium: St. Jakob-Park; Attendance: 16,500; Referee: Frank De Bleeckere (Belgium)

November 17 International Friendly	South Africa	0–1	United States	Johannesburg, South Africa
16:00 UTC+02		(Report)	27' Cherundolo	Stadium: Ellis Park Stadium; Attendance: 30,000; Referee: Eddie Maillet (Seychelles)

=== Women ===
==== Senior ====
Wins	Losses	Draws
19	1	4

The United States Women's National Soccer Team was coached by Pia Sundhage.

===== Four Nations Tournament =====
Jan 26	United States	0–0	Germany	Guangzhou, China
3:00 a.m. UTC-05		Report		Stadium: Guangdong Olympic Stadium; Attendance: 1,500; Referee: Deng Junxia (CHN); Assistant referees: Fu Hongjue (CHN); Da Fuping (CHN); Fourth official: Amy Rayner (GBR)

Jan 28	United States	1–1	England	Guangzhou, China
3:00 a.m. UTC-05	O'Reilly 17'	Report	Scott 47'	Stadium: Guangdong Olympic Stadium; Attendance: 3,000; Referee: Bibiana Steinhaus (GER); Assistant referees: Zhang Lingling (CHN); Liu Hongjuan (CHN); Fourth official: Da Fuping (CHN)

Jan 30	United States	2–0	China	Guangzhou, China
3:00 a.m. UTC-05	Chalupny 45+1'; Kai 56'	Report		Stadium: Guangdong Olympic Stadium; Attendance: 8,000; Referee: Amy Rayner (GBR); Assistant referees: Liu Hongjuan (CHN); Hu An Qi (CHN); Fourth official: Qu Xiaoguang (CHN)

===== Algarve Cup =====
Mar 7 Group Round	United States	2–1	China	Silves, Portugal
11:15 a.m. UTC-05	Lilly 19' (pen.); Lloyd 38'	Report	Duan 21'	Stadium: Estadio Municipal; Attendance: 500; Referee: Gyongyi Gaal (HUN); Assistant referees: Emilia Parvainen (FIN); Karine Vives Solana (FRA); Fourth official: Natalia Advonchenko (RUS)

Mar 9 Group Round	United States	1–0	Finland	Ferreiras, Portugal
11:15 a.m. UTC-05	Lloyd 46'	Report		Stadium: Parque Desportiva da Nora; Attendance: 500; Referee: Bentla D’Coth (IND); Assistant referees: Kyoung Min Kim (KOR); Ja Daw Kaw (MYA); Fourth official: Eun Ah Hong (KOR)

Mar 12 Group Round	United States	3–2	Sweden	Vila Real de San Antonio, Portugal
4:00 p.m. UTC-05	Wambach 39', 72'; Lloyd 44'	Report	Oqvist 71'; Svensson 83' (pen.)	Stadium: Estadio Municipal; Attendance: 1,000; Referee: Etsuko Fukano (JPN); Assistant referees: Hongjuan Liu (CHN); Hongjue Fu (CHN)

Mar 14 Final	United States	2–0	Denmark	Vila Real de San Antonio, Portugal
12:30 p.m. UTC-05	Lilly 12'; Lloyd 51'	Report		Stadium: Estadio Municipal; Attendance: 1,000; Referee: Pannipar Kamnueng (THA); Assistant referees: Hongjuan Liu (CHN); Hongjue Fu (CHN); Fourth official: Bentla D’coth (IND)

===== International Friendlies =====
Apr 14	United States	5–0	Mexico	Foxborough, Massachusetts
5:00 p.m. UTC-05	Wambach 10'; Tarpley 33'; Lilly 50', 70'; Cheney 88'	Report		Stadium: Gillette Stadium; Attendance: 18,184; Referee: Rachel Woo; Assistant referees: Kim Oberle; Sharon Wheeler; Fourth official: Niko Bratsis

May 12	United States	6–2	Canada	Frisco, Texas
7:30 p.m. UTC-05	Wambach 3', 65'; Tarpley 13'; Chalupny 28'; Lilly 35'; O'Reilly 73'	Report	Wilkinson 11'; Sinclair 50'	Stadium: Pizza Hut Park; Attendance: 8,569; Referee: Sandra Serafini (USA); Assistant referees: Margaret Domka (USA); Kim Oberle (USA); Fourth official: Shelley Finger (USA)

June 16	United States	2–0	China	Cleveland, Ohio
7:00 p.m. UTC-05	Wambach 67', 88'	Report		Stadium: Cleveland Browns Stadium; Attendance: 8,888; Referee: Kari Seitz; Assistant referees: Sharon Wheeler; Margaret Domka; Fourth official: Rachel Woo

June 23	United States	2–0	Brazil	East Rutherford, New Jersey
7:00 p.m. UTC-05	Lilly 1'; Wambach 17'	Report		Stadium: Giants Stadium; Attendance: 16,856; Referee: Rachel Woo (USA); Assistant referees: Sharon Wheeler (USA); Kim Oberle (USA); Fourth official: Sandra Serafini (USA)

July 14	United States	1–0	Norway	East Hartford, Connecticut
6:00 p.m. UTC-05	Lloyd 66'	Report		Stadium: Rentschler Field; Attendance: 9,957; Referee: Kari Seitz (USA); Assistant referees: Sharon Wheeler (USA); Margaret Domka (USA); Fourth official: Rachel Woo (USA)

July 28	United States	4–1	Japan	San Jose, California
10:00 p.m. UTC-05	Boxx 17'; Kinga 41' (o.g.); Lilly 55'; Wambach 72' (pen.)	Report	Nagasato 79'	Stadium: Spartan Stadium; Attendance: 11,290; Referee: Jennifer Bennett; Assistant referees: Sharon Wheeler; Margaret Domka; Fourth official: Kari Seitz

Aug 12	United States	6–1	New Zealand	Chicago, Illinois
1:00 p.m. UTC-05	Wambach 7', 90'; Lilly 33'; Lloyd 34', 60'; Tarpley 57'	Report	Smith 73'	Stadium: Soldier Field; Attendance: 7,015; Referee: Jennifer Bennett; Assistant referees: Sharon Wheeler; Margaret Domka; Fourth official: Kristine Lamm

Aug 25	United States	4–0	Finland	Carson, California
9:30 p.m. UTC-05	Boxx 30'; Lilly 36'; Tarpley 68'; O'Reilly 76'	Report		Stadium: The Home Depot Center; Attendance: 7,118; Referee: Kari Seitz; Assistant referees: Flisha Mariscal; Marlene Duffy; Fourth official: Jennifer Bennett

===== World Cup =====
Sep 11 Group B	United States	2–2	North Korea	Chengdu, China
5:00 a.m. UTC-05	Wambach 50'; O'Reilly 69'	Report	Son Hui 58'; Yong Ae 62'	Stadium: Chengdu Sports Center Stadium; Attendance: 35,100; Referee: Nicole Petignat (SUI); Assistant referees: Corinne LaGrange (FRA); Karine Vives Solana (FRA); Fourth official: Dagmar Damkova (CZE)

Sep 14 Group B	United States	2–0	Sweden	Chengdu, China
5:00 a.m. UTC-05	Wambach 34' (pen.), 58'	Report		Stadium: Chengdu Sports Center Stadium; Attendance: n/a Referee: Gyoengyi Gaal (HUN); Assistant referees: Maria Luisa Villa Gutierrez (ESP); Cristina Cini (ITA); Fourth official: Christine Beck (GER)

Sep 18 Group B	United States	1–0	Nigeria	Shanghai, China
8:00 a.m. UTC-05	Chalupny 1'	Report		Stadium: Shanghai Hongkou Football Stadium; Attendance: 6,500; Referee: Mayumi OIWA (JPN); Assistant referees: Hisae YOSHIZAWA (JPN); Liu Hsiu Mei (TPE); Fourth official: Estela Alvarez (ARG)

Sep 22 Quarterfinals	United States	3–0	England	Tianjin, China
8:00 a.m. UTC-05	Wambach 48'; Boxx 57'; Lilly 60'	Report		Stadium: Tianjin Olympic Center Stadium; Attendance: 29,586; Referee: Jenny Palmqvist (SWE); Assistant referees: Susanne Borg (SWE); Hege Steinlund (NOR); Fourth official: Mayumi Oiwa (JPN)

Sep 27 Semifinals	Brazil	4–0	United States	Hangzhou, China
8:00 a.m. UTC-05	Osborne 20' (o.g.); Marta 27', 80'; Cristiane 56'	Report		Stadium: Hangzhou Dragon Stadium; Attendance: 47,818; Referee: Nicole Petignat (SUI); Assistant referees: Karine Vives Solana (FRA); Corinne Lagrange (FRA); Fourth official: Tammy Ogston (AUS)

Sep 30 Third-place playoff	United States	4–1	Norway	Shanghai, China
8:00 a.m. UTC-05	Wambach 30', 46'; Chalupny 58'; O'Reilly 59'	Report	Gulbrandsen 63'	Stadium: Shanghai Hongkou Football Stadium; Attendance: 34,000; Referee: Gyoengyi Gaal (HUN); Assistant referees: Maria Luisa Villa Gutierrez (ESP); Miriam Draeger (GER); Fourth official: Christine Beck (GER)

===== International Friendlies =====
Oct 13	United States	5–1	Mexico	St. Louis, Missouri
8:00 p.m. UTC-05	O'Reilly 32'; Wambach 57', 81'; Lilly 67'; Lloyd 84'	Report	Lopez 3'	Stadium: Edward Jones Dome; Attendance: 10,861; Referee: Kari Seitz (USA); Assistant referees: George Major (USA); Younasse Tarbouni (USA); Fourth official: Jeff Shelton (USA)

Oct 17	United States	4–0	Mexico	Portland, Oregon
10:00 p.m. UTC-05	Lilly 45+1'; Wambach 76'; Kai 82'; Lloyd 87'	Report		Stadium: PGE Park; Attendance: 10,006; Referee: Margaret Domka (USA); Assistant referees: Veronica Perez (USA); Cindy Brooks (USA); Fourth official: Jessica Baumann (USA)

Oct 20	United States	1–1	Mexico	Albuquerque, New Mexico
6:30 p.m. UTC-05	O'Reilly 62'	Report	Ocampo 56'	Stadium: University Stadium; Attendance: 8,972; Referee: Jennifer Bennett (USA); Assistant referees: Marlene Duffy (USA); Jeremy Vehar (USA); Fourth official: Chris Sanchez (USA)

== Major League Soccer ==
=== Table ===
Pos	Club	Pts	GP	W	L	T	GF	GA	GD
1	D.C. United (E1)	55	30	16	7	7	56	34	+22
2	Chivas USA (W1)	53	30	15	7	8	46	28	+18
3	Houston Dynamo (W2)	52	30	15	8	7	43	23	+20
4	New England Revolution (E2)	50	30	14	8	8	51	43	+8
5	FC Dallas	44	30	13	12	5	37	44	–7
6	New York Red Bulls	43	30	12	11	7	47	45	+2
7	Chicago Fire	40	30	10	10	10	31	36	–5
8	Kansas City Wizards	40	30	11	12	7	45	45	0
9	Columbus Crew	37	30	9	11	10	39	44	–5
10	Colorado Rapids	35	30	9	13	8	29	34	–5
11	Los Angeles Galaxy	34	30	9	14	7	38	48	–10
12	Real Salt Lake	27	30	6	15	9	31	45	–14
13	Toronto FC	25	30	6	17	7	25	49	–24

MLS Supporters' Shield, 2007 MLS Cup Playoffs, 2008 CONCACAF Champions' Cup, SuperLiga 2008, CONCACAF Champions League 2008-09
2007 MLS Cup Playoffs, SuperLiga 2008, CONCACAF Champions League 2008–09
2007 MLS Cup Playoffs, SuperLiga 2008
2007 MLS Cup Playoffs

- ^2 – Toronto FC cannot qualify for the CONCACAF Champions League through MLS. Rather, they can qualify through the Canadian Championship.
  If they had qualified for the Champions League through MLS, then the highest placed team not already qualified would have qualified.
- ^3 – Additional Champions League berths were awarded to the winner (Houston) and runner-up (New England) of MLS Cup 2007.
  The winner of the 2007 U.S. Open Cup (New England) also qualified.
  Because New England qualified twice, an additional berth was awarded to the 2007 MLS Supporters' Shield runner-up (Chivas USA).

=== Playoffs ===
Conference Semifinals
E1	D.C. United	0	2
E4	Chicago Fire	1	2
Eastern Conference
E3	New York Red Bulls	0	0
E2	New England Revolution	0	1
W1	Chivas USA	0	0
W4	Kansas City Wizards^{1}	1	0
Western Conference
W3	FC Dallas	1	1
W2	Houston Dynamo (aet)	0	4

Conference Finals
E4	Chicago Fire	0
E2	New England Revolution	1
W4	Kansas City Wizards	0
W2	Houston Dynamo	2

MLS Cup 2007
E2	New England Revolution	1
W2	Houston Dynamo	2

^{1} The Kansas City Wizards earned the eighth and final playoff berth, despite finishing fifth in the Eastern Conference. They represent the fourth seed in the Western Conference playoff bracket, as only three teams in the Western Conference qualified for the playoffs.

=== MLS Cup ===
November 18
12:00 UTC−05

New England Revolution	1–2	Houston Dynamo
Twellman 20'	Report	Ngwenya 61'; De Rosario 74'

RFK Stadium, Washington, D.C.
Attendance: 39,859
Referee: Alex Prus

== USL First Division ==
=== Table ===
Purple indicates regular season champion
Green indicates playoff berth clinched

Place	Team	P	W	L	T	GF	GA	GD	Points
1	Seattle Sounders	28	16	6	6	37	23	+14	54
2	Portland Timbers	28	14	5	9	32	18	+14	51
3	Montreal Impact	28	14	6	8	32	21	+11	50
4	Atlanta Silverbacks	28	12	9	7	40	30	+10	43
5	Rochester Raging Rhinos	28	12	10	6	39	36	+3	42
6	Puerto Rico Islanders	28	10	8	10	35	34	+1	40
7	Vancouver Whitecaps	28	9	7	12	27	24	+3	39
8	Carolina RailHawks	28	8	12	8	24	34	−10	32
9	Miami FC	28	9	15	4	31	41	−10	31
10	Charleston Battery	28	8	14	6	32	39	−7	30
11	Minnesota Thunder	28	5	12	11	32	35	−3	26
12	California Victory	28	4	17	7	17	43	−26	19

==== Playoffs ====
Quarterfinals; September 14/16
1	Seattle Sounders	2	1	3
8	Carolina RailHawks	0	0	0
3	Montreal Impact	3	0	3
6	Puerto Rico Islanders	2	3	5
4	Atlanta Silverbacks	2	1	3
5	Rochester Raging Rhinos	1	1	2
2	Portland Timbers	0	3	3
7	Vancouver Whitecaps	1	0	1

Semifinals; September 21/23
1	Seattle Sounders (PK's)	2	0	2 (4)
6	Puerto Rico Islanders	1	1	2 (2)
4	Atlanta Silverbacks (PK's)	1	0	1 (3)
2	Portland Timbers	1	0	1 (1)

Final; September 29
1	Seattle Sounders	4
4	Atlanta Silverbacks	0

=== Final ===
September 29

Seattle Sounders	4–0	Atlanta Silverbacks
Howes 45', 82'; Alcaraz-Cuellar 61'; Tomlinson 90'	(Report)

Starfire Sports Complex, Tukwila, Washington

== USL Second Division ==
=== Table ===
Place	Team	P	W	L	T	GF	GA	GD	Points
1	Richmond Kickers	20	12	3	5	37	15	+22	41
2	Cleveland City Stars	20	10	1	8	31	14	+17	39
3	Harrisburg City Islanders	20	11	4	5	26	15	+11	38
4	Charlotte Eagles	20	11	7	2	40	29	+11	35
5	Crystal Palace Baltimore	20	9	6	5	27	20	+7	32
6	Western Mass Pioneers	20	7	7	6	25	26	−1	27
7	Wilmington Hammerheads	20	4	9	7	22	30	−8	19
8	Cincinnati Kings	20	4	11	5	29	41	−12	17
9	New Hampshire Phantoms	20	3	12	5	16	34	−18	13^{1}
10	Bermuda Hogges	20	3	14	3	16	45	−29	12

^{1}New Hampshire was penalized 1 point for circumstances not released by the USL.

=== Playoffs ===
Quarterfinals; August 13
4	Crystal Palace Baltimore (AET/PK)	2 (7)
5	Harrisburg City Islanders	2 (6)
3	Cleveland City Stars	4
6	Western Mass Pioneers	2

Semifinals; August 16
1	Charlotte Eagles	2
4	Crystal Palace Baltimore	1
2	Richmond Kickers	0
3	Cleveland City Stars(AET)	1

Final; August 23
1	Charlotte Eagles	1
3	Cleveland City Stars	2

=== Final ===
August 27

Richmond Kickers	1–1 (a.e.t.)	Harrisburg City Islanders
Schramm 75'	(Report)	Ombiji 45'
Penalties
	8–7

University of Richmond Stadium, Richmond, Virginia

== Lamar Hunt U.S. Open Cup ==
Third round July 9–18
USL-1	Seattle Sounders	3
MLS	Chivas USA	1
MLS	Colorado Rapids	3
USL-1	California Victory	1
USL-1	Charleston Battery (OT)	1
MLS	Houston Dynamo	0
MLS	FC Dallas (PK's)	1 (4)
USL-1	Atlanta Silverbacks	1 (3)
USL-1	Rochester Raging Rhinos	2
MLS	New England Revolution	4
USL-2	Harrisburg City Islanders	1
MLS	D.C. United	0
USL-1	Carolina RailHawks	1
MLS	Chicago Fire	0
USL-2	Richmond Kickers	1
MLS	Los Angeles Galaxy	0

Quarterfinals; August 7–8
USL-1	Seattle Sounders	5
MLS	Colorado Rapids	0
USL-1	Charleston Battery	1
MLS	FC Dallas (OT)	2
MLS	New England Revolution	2
USL-2	Harrisburg City Islanders	1
USL-1	Carolina RailHawks	1
USL-2	Richmond Kickers	0

Semifinals; September 4
USL-1	Seattle Sounders	1
MLS	FC Dallas (OT)	2
MLS	New England Revolution (OT)	2
USL-1	Carolina RailHawks	1

Final; October 3
MLS	FC Dallas	2
MLS	New England Revolution	3

=== Final ===
October 3
20:00 UTC−04

New England Revolution	3–2	FC Dallas
Noonan 21'; Twellman 41'; Wells Thompson 57'	(Report)	Alvarez 30'; Abe Thompson 64'

Pizza Hut Park, Frisco, Texas
Attendance: 10,618
Referee: Alex Prus

== American clubs in international competitions ==
Club	Competition	Final round
Houston Dynamo	2007 CONCACAF Champions' Cup	Semifinal
Houston Dynamo	2007 North American SuperLiga	Semifinal
D.C. United	2007 CONCACAF Champions' Cup	Semifinal
D.C. United	2007 North American SuperLiga	Semifinal
Los Angeles Galaxy	2007 North American SuperLiga	Final
FC Dallas	2007 North American SuperLiga	Group stage

=== Houston Dynamo ===
February 21 Champions Cup Quarterfinals	Puntarenas (Costa Rica)	1–0	(United States) Houston	Puntarenas, Costa Rica
13:35 UTC-05	Bernard 90+2'	(Report)		Stadium: Estadio Lito Pérez; Referee: German Arredondo (Mexico)

March 1 Champions Cup Quarterfinals	Houston (United States)	2–0	(Costa Rica) Puntarenas	College Station, Texas
20:05 UTC-06	Dalglish 27'; Gray 74'			Stadium: Aggie Soccer Stadium; Attendance: 4,286; Referee: Benito Archundia (Mexico)

March 15 Champions Cup Semifinals	Houston (United States)	2–0	(Mexico) Pachuca	Houston, Texas
19:30 UTC-05	Ching 57'; Wondolowski 84'	Report		Stadium: Robertson Stadium; Attendance: 13,007; Referee: Neal Brizan (Trinidad & Tobago)

April 5 Champions Cup Semifinals	Pachuca (Mexico)	5–2 (a.e.t.)	(United States) Houston	Pachuca, Mexico
18:35 UTC-05	Caballero 4', 86'; Giménez 15' (pen.), 58' (pen.), 105'	Report	Mullan 53'; Ching 79'	Stadium: Estadio Hidalgo; Attendance: 30,000; Referee: Mauricio Navarro (CAN)

July 25 SuperLiga group stage	Houston (United States)	1–0	(Mexico) América	Houston, Texas
22:00 UTC-05	Jaqua 41'	(Report)		Stadium: Robertson Stadium; Attendance: 18,112; Referee: Steven Taylor (referee)

July 29 SuperLiga group stage	Houston (United States)	1–1	(Mexico) Monarcas Morelia	Houston, Texas
22:00 UTC-05	Ngwenya 1'	(Report)	Batista 74'	Stadium: Robertson Stadium; Attendance: 11,236; Referee: Wálter Quesada (Costa Rica)

August 1 SuperLiga group stage	Houston (United States)	1–0	(United States) D.C. United	Houston, Texas
20:00 UTC-05	Ching 50'	(Report)	Batista 74'	Stadium: Robertson Stadium; Attendance: 11,013; Referee: Baldomero Toledo

August 14 SuperLiga Semifinal	Houston (United States)	2–2 (a.e.t.) (3–4 p)	(Mexico) Pachuca	Houston, Texas
22:00 UTC-05	DeRosario 4'; Robinson 83'	(Report)	Cacho 28'; Chitiva 62'	Stadium: Robertson Stadium; Attendance: 21,712; Referee: Ricardo Salazar
	Penalties
	Barrett (penalty scored); Wondolowski (penalty scored); Mulrooney (penalty scored); Ching (penalty missed); Ngwenya (penalty missed)		(penalty scored) Salazar; (penalty scored) Caballero; (penalty scored) Rey; (penalty missed) Álvarez; (penalty scored) Lugo

=== D.C. United ===
February 21 Champions Cup Quarterfinals	Olimpia (Honduras)	1–4	(United States) D.C. United	Tegucigalpa, Honduras
20:00 UTC-06	Cárcamo 34'		Gómez 31', 59'; Emilio 45'; Erpen 84'	Stadium: Estadio Tiburcio Carías Andino; Referee: Jorge Gasso (Mexico)

March 1 Champions Cup Quarterfinals	D.C. United (United States)	3–2	(Honduras) Olimpia	Washington, D.C.
19:05 UTC-05	Emilio 37', 84'; Gómez 49' (pen.)	(Report)	Thomas 30' (pen.); Pacini 75'	Stadium: RFK Stadium; Attendance: 8,181; Referee: Mauricio Navarro (Canada)

March 15 Champions Cup Semifinals	D.C. United (United States)	1–1	(Mexico) Guadalajara	Washington, D.C.
20:00 UTC-04	Emilio 90+1'	(Report)	Bravo 63'	Stadium: RFK Stadium; Attendance: 26,528; Referee: Silviu Petrescu (Canada)

April 3 Champions Cup Semifinals	Guadalajara (Mexico)	2–1	(United States) D.C. United	Guadalajara, Mexico
20:30 UTC-05	Bravo 63'; Pineda 52'	(Report)	Moreno 36'	Stadium: Estadio Jalisco; Attendance: 30,000; Referee: Roberto Moreno (Panama)

July 25 SuperLiga group stage	D.C. United (United States)	1–1	(Mexico) Monarcas Morelia	Washington, D.C.
20:00 UTC-04	Gomez 7'	(Report)	Martínez 79'	Stadium: RFK Stadium; Attendance: 13,335; Referee: Courtney Campbell (Jamaica)

July 29 SuperLiga group stage	D.C. United (United States)	1–0	(Mexico) América	Washington, D.C.
20:00 UTC-04	Dyachenko 12'	(Report)		Stadium: RFK Stadium; Attendance: 18,604; Referee: Carlos Batres (Guatemala)

August 1 SuperLiga group stage	Houston (United States)	1–0	(United States) D.C. United	Houston, Texas
20:00 UTC-05	Ching 50'	(Report)	Batista 74'	Stadium: Robertson Stadium; Attendance: 11,013; Referee: Baldomero Toledo

August 15 SuperLiga Semifinal	Los Angeles Galaxy (United States)	2–0	(United States) D.C. United	Carson, California
22:00 UTC-07	Beckham 27'; Donovan 47'	(Report)		Stadium: Home Depot Center; Attendance: 17,223; Referee: Alex Prus

=== Los Angeles Galaxy ===
July 24 SuperLiga group stage	Los Angeles (United States)	2–1	(Mexico) Pachuca	Carson, California
19:00 UTC-07	Gordon 50'; Donovan 81'	(Report)	Márquez Lugo 78'	Stadium: Home Depot Center; Attendance: 19,317; Referee: Carlos Batres (Guatemala)

July 28 SuperLiga group stage	Los Angeles (United States)	1–2	(Mexico) Guadalajara	Los Angeles, California
22:00 UTC-07	Donovan 88'	(Report)	Rodríguez 59'; Bravo 82'	Stadium: Los Angeles Coliseum; Attendance: 37,337; Referee: Courtney Campbell (Jamaica)

July 31 SuperLiga group stage	FC Dallas (United States)	5–6	(United States) Los Angeles	Frisco, Texas
20:00 UTC-05	Alvarez 43'; Toja 78'; Alvarez 82'; Ruíz 90+1'; Thompson 90+6'	(Report)	Gordon 3'; Klein 12'; Gordon 15'; Harmse 18'; Donovan 84'; Pavón 90+5'	Stadium: Pizza Hut Park; Attendance: 21,576; Referee: Kevin Stott

August 15 SuperLiga Semifinal	Los Angeles (United States)	2–0	(United States) D.C. United	Carson, California
22:00 UTC-07	Beckham 27'; Donovan 47'	(Report)		Stadium: Home Depot Center; Attendance: 17,223; Referee: Alex Prus

August 29 SuperLiga Final	Los Angeles (United States)	1–1 (a.e.t.) (3–4 p)	(Mexico) Pachuca	Carson, California
20:00 UTC-07	Klein 90+3'	(Report)	Vagenas 29' (o.g.)	Stadium: Home Depot Center; Attendance: 12,500; Referee: Carlos Batres (Guatemala)
	Penalties
	Vagenas (penalty missed); Jones (penalty scored); Klein (penalty scored); Buddle (penalty scored); Donovan (penalty missed); Xavier (penalty missed)		(penalty scored) Lugo; (penalty scored) Rey; (penalty missed) Caballero; (penalty scored) Manzur; (penalty missed) Cabrera; (penalty scored) Rodríguez

=== FC Dallas ===
July 24 SuperLiga group stage	FC Dallas (United States)	1–1	(Mexico) Guadalajara	Frisco, Texas
21:00 UTC-05	Alvarez 56'	(Report)	Olvera 67'	Stadium: Pizza Hut Park; Attendance: 12,641; Referee: Wálter Quesada (Costa Rica)

July 28 SuperLiga group stage	FC Dallas (United States)	1–1	(Mexico) Pachuca	Frisco, Texas
20:00 UTC-05	Ruíz 75'	(Report)	Giménez 87' (pen.)	Stadium: Pizza Hut Park; Attendance: 7,953; Referee: Samir Osman (Egypt)

July 31 SuperLiga group stage	FC Dallas (United States)	5–6	(United States) Los Angeles	Frisco, Texas
20:00 UTC-05	Alvarez 43'; Toja 78'; Alvarez 82'; Ruíz 90+1'; Thompson 90+6'	(Report)	Gordon 3'; Klein 12'; Gordon 15'; Harmse 18'; Donovan 84'; Pavón 90+5'	Stadium: Pizza Hut Park; Attendance: 21,576; Referee: Kevin Stott
