= 2008 Suruga Bank Championship =

Gamba Osaka	Arsenal
(Japan)	(Argentina)
0	1
- Date: July 30, 2008
- Venue: Nagai Stadium, Osaka
- Referee: Liang Zhao (China)
- Attendance: 19,278
- Weather: Fine; 31.0°C

The 2008 Suruga Bank Championship (Japanese: スルガ銀行チャンピオンシップ2008; Spanish: Copa Suruga Bank 2008) is the inaugural match between the winners of the previous season's J. League Cup and the Copa Sudamericana. It was contested by the 2007 J. League Cup winner Japanese club Gamba Osaka and the 2007 Copa Sudamericana champion Argentine club Arsenal.

The match was won by Arsenal after a late second-half header by Carlos Casteglione off a corner kick by Javier Yacuzzi.

== Summary ==
July 30, 2008
19:00 (UTC+9)

Gamba Osaka (Japan)	0–1	(Argentina) Arsenal
	Report	Casteglione 87'

Nagai Stadium, Osaka
Attendance: 19,728
Referee: Liang Zhao (China)

Gamba Osaka	Arsenal

GAMBA OSAKA:
GK	22	(Japan) Yosuke Fujigaya
DF	2	(Japan) Sota Nakazawa	(yellow card) 87'
DF	5	(Japan) Satoshi Yamaguchi (c)		(substituted off) 90+7'
DF	19	(Japan) Takumi Shimohira		(substituted off) 88'
DF	21	(Japan) Akira Kaji		(substituted off) 63'
MF	10	(Japan) Takahiro Futagawa
MF	16	(Japan) Hayato Sasaki		(substituted off) 84'
MF	17	(Japan) Tomokazu Myojin		(substituted off) 90+4'
MF	27	(Japan) Hideo Hashimoto
FW	9	(Brazil) Lucas
FW	30	(Japan) Masato Yamazaki		(substituted off) 67'
Substitutes:
GK	25	(Japan) Naoki Matsuyo
DF	9	(Brazil) Mineiro		(substituted on) 88'
DF	5	(Japan) Yohei Fukumoto		(substituted on) 63'
MF	14	(Japan) Shu Kurata	(yellow card) 87'	(substituted on) 67'
MF	11	(Japan) Takuya Takei		(substituted on) 84'
FW	15	(Japan) Shoki Hirai		(substituted on) 90+4'
FW	22	(Japan) Hideya Okamoto		(substituted on) 90+7'
Manager:
(Japan) Akira Nishino

ARSENAL:
GK	1	(Argentina) Mario Cuenca
DF	18	(Argentina) Christian Díaz	(red card) 90+5'
DF	4	(Argentina) Darío Espínola		(substituted off) 81'
DF	6	(Argentina) Aníbal Matellán
DF	19	(Colombia) Josimar Mosquera
MF	16	(Argentina) Sebastián Carrera		(substituted off) 71'
MF	13	(Argentina) Carlos Casteglione (c)
MF	5	(Argentina) Cristian Pellerano	(yellow card) 89'	(substituted off) 90+4'
MF	8	(Argentina) Javier Yacuzzi
FW	10	(Argentina) Alejandro Gómez		(substituted off) 90+2'
FW	11	(Argentina) Facundo Sava	(yellow card) 19'	(substituted off) 76'
Substitutes:
GK	12	(Argentina) Catriel Orcellet
DF	3	(Paraguay) Carlos Báez
DF	2	(Argentina) Mariano Brau
DF	14	(Argentina) Javier Gandolfi		(substituted on) 81'
DF	20	(Argentina) Damián Pérez
MF	15	(Argentina) Nahuel Sachetto		(substituted on) 90+2'
MF	7	(Argentina) Andrés San Martín		(substituted on) 90+4'
FW	17	(Argentina) Facundo Coria		(substituted on) 76'
FW	9	(Argentina) Luciano Leguizamón		(substituted on) 71'
Manager:
(Argentina) Daniel Garnero

Assistant referees:
(China) Weiming Huo
(China) Dongnan Li
Fourth official:
(Japan) Hajim Matsuo
