= Mariano Brau =

Argentine footballer

Mariano Sebastián Brau (born July 10, 1982, in Avellaneda, Argentina) is an Argentine former professional footballer who played as a defender.

== Teams ==
- Arsenal de Sarandí 2003–2007
- Estudiantes Tecos 2007
- Arsenal de Sarandí 2007–2009
- All Boys 2010–2011
- Oriente Petrolero 2011–2016
- Royal Pari 2018–2020

== Honours ==
Arsenal de Sarandí

- Copa Sudamericana: 2007
- Suruga Bank Championship: 2008
