= 2007 MLS Cup playoffs =

2007 edition of the MLS playoffs

Tournament details
- Country: United States
- Teams: 8

Final positions
- Champions: Houston Dynamo (2nd title)
- Runners-up: New England Revolution
- Semifinalists: Chicago Fire; Kansas City Wizards

Tournament statistics
- Matches played: 11
- Goals scored: 19 (1.73 per match)
- Top goal scorer(s): (United States) Taylor Twellman (3 goals)

The 2007 MLS Cup playoffs was the postseason to Major League Soccer's 2007 season, and concluded with MLS Cup 2007 on November 18, 2007 at RFK Stadium in Washington, D.C. The Houston Dynamo were victorious for the second season in a row, defeating the New England Revolution in the championship match, also for the second year in a row.

== Format ==
At season's end, the top two teams of each conference made the playoffs, along with the teams with the next four highest point totals, regardless of conference. In the first round of this knockout tournament, aggregate goals over two matches determined the winners; the conference finals were one match each, with the winner of each conference advancing to MLS Cup 2007. In all rounds, ties after 90 minutes were determined with two 15-minute periods of extra time, followed by a penalty shoot-out if necessary. The away goals rule was not used.

== Qualified teams ==
=== Conference standings ===
Eastern Conference
Pos	Club	Pts	Pld	W	L	T	GF	GA	GD
1	D.C. United	55	30	16	7	7	56	34	+22
2	New England Revolution	50	30	14	8	8	51	43	+8
3	New York Red Bulls	43	30	12	11	7	47	45	+2
4	Chicago Fire	40	30	10	10	10	31	36	–5
5	Kansas City Wizards	40	30	11	12	7	45	45	0
6	Columbus Crew	37	30	9	11	10	39	44	–5
7	Toronto FC	25	30	6	17	7	25	49	–24

Western Conference
Pos	Club	Pts	Pld	W	L	T	GF	GA	GD
1	Chivas USA	53	30	15	7	8	46	28	+18
2	Houston Dynamo	52	30	15	8	7	43	23	+20
3	FC Dallas	44	30	13	12	5	37	44	–7
4	Colorado Rapids	35	30	9	13	8	29	34	–5
5	Los Angeles Galaxy	34	30	9	14	7	38	48	–10
6	Real Salt Lake	27	30	6	15	9	31	45	–14

2007 MLS Cup playoffs, 2008 U.S. Open Cup
2007 MLS Cup playoffs (Wild Card)
2007 MLS Cup playoffs, 2008 U.S. Open Cup
2007 MLS Cup playoffs (Wild Card), 2008 U.S. Open Cup

- ^1 - Toronto FC could not qualify for the U.S. Open Cup, as they were a Canadian-based team.
  If they had qualified for an automatic berth into the U.S. Open Cup, the next highest placed team in the Eastern Conference not already qualified would have qualified.

=== Overall standings ===
Pos	Club	Pts	Pld	W	L	T	GF	GA	GD
1	D.C. United (E1)	55	30	16	7	7	56	34	+22
2	Chivas USA (W1)	53	30	15	7	8	46	28	+18
3	Houston Dynamo (W2)	52	30	15	8	7	43	23	+20
4	New England Revolution (E2)	50	30	14	8	8	51	43	+8
5	FC Dallas	44	30	13	12	5	37	44	–7
6	New York Red Bulls	43	30	12	11	7	47	45	+2
7	Chicago Fire	40	30	10	10	10	31	36	–5
8	Kansas City Wizards	40	30	11	12	7	45	45	0
9	Columbus Crew	37	30	9	11	10	39	44	–5
10	Colorado Rapids	35	30	9	13	8	29	34	–5
11	Los Angeles Galaxy	34	30	9	14	7	38	48	–10
12	Real Salt Lake	27	30	6	15	9	31	45	–14
13	Toronto FC	25	30	6	17	7	25	49	–24

MLS Supporters' Shield, 2007 MLS Cup playoffs, 2008 CONCACAF Champions' Cup, 2008 SuperLiga, 2008–09 CONCACAF Champions League
2007 MLS Cup playoffs, 2008 SuperLiga, 2008–09 CONCACAF Champions League
2007 MLS Cup playoffs, 2008 SuperLiga
2007 MLS Cup playoffs

- ^2 - Toronto FC could not qualify for the CONCACAF Champions League through MLS. Rather, they could qualify through the Canadian Championship.
  If they had qualified for the Champions League through MLS, then the highest placed team not already qualified would have qualified.
- ^3 - Additional Champions League berths were awarded to the winner (Houston) and runner-up (New England) of MLS Cup 2007.
  The winner of the 2007 U.S. Open Cup (New England) also qualified.
  Because New England qualified twice, an additional berth was awarded to the 2007 MLS Supporters' Shield runner-up (Chivas USA).

== Bracket ==
Conference semifinals
E1	D.C. United	0	2
WC	Chicago Fire	1	2
Eastern Conference
WC	New York Red Bulls	0	0
E2	New England Revolution	0	1
W1	Chivas USA	0	0
WC	Kansas City Wizards^{1}	1	0
Western Conference
WC	FC Dallas	1	1
W2	Houston Dynamo (a.e.t.)	0	4

Conference finals
WC	Chicago Fire	0
E2	New England Revolution	1
WC	Kansas City Wizards	0
W2	Houston Dynamo	2

MLS Cup
E2	New England Revolution	1
W2	Houston Dynamo	2

^{1} The Kansas City Wizards earned the eighth and final playoff berth, despite finishing fifth in the Eastern Conference. They represented the fourth seed in the Western Conference playoff bracket, as only three teams in the Western Conference qualified for the playoffs.

== Conference semifinals ==
=== Eastern Conference ===
October 25
7:30 pm CDT

Chicago Fire	1–0	D.C. United
Rolfe 14'	Report

Toyota Park, Bridgeview, Illinois
Attendance: 17,834
Referee: Baldomero Toledo
November 1
7:30 pm EDT

D.C. United	2–2	Chicago Fire
Simms 69'; Gomez 74'	Report	Barrett 31'; Rolfe 33'

RFK Stadium, Washington, D.C.
Attendance: 19,438
Referee: Jair Marrufo

Chicago Fire won 3–2 on aggregate.

October 27
7:30 pm EDT

New York Red Bulls	0–0	New England Revolution
	Report

Giants Stadium, East Rutherford, New Jersey
Attendance: 14,165
Referee: Jair Marrufo
November 3
7:30 pm EDT

New England Revolution	1–0	New York Red Bulls
Twellman 64'	Report

Gillette Stadium, Foxborough, Massachusetts
Attendance: 10,116
Referee: Abiodun Okulaja

New England Revolution won 1–0 on aggregate.

=== Western Conference ===
October 27
7:00 pm CDT

Kansas City Wizards	1–0	Chivas USA
Arnaud 35'	Report

Arrowhead Stadium, Kansas City, Missouri
Attendance: 12,442
Referee: Alex Prus
November 3
7:30 pm PDT

Chivas USA	0–0	Kansas City Wizards
	Report

Home Depot Center, Carson, California
Attendance: 19,711
Referee: Mark Geiger

Kansas City Wizards won 1–0 on aggregate.

October 27
7:00 pm CDT

FC Dallas	1–0	Houston Dynamo
Goodson 23'	Report

Pizza Hut Park, Frisco, Texas
Attendance: 12,537
Referee: Kevin Stott
November 2
7:30 pm CDT

Houston Dynamo	4–1 (a.e.t.)	FC Dallas
Holden 67'; Ching 72', 97'; Davis 100'	Report	Ruiz 14'

Robertson Stadium, Houston, Texas
Attendance: 30,088
Referee: Baldomero Toledo

Houston Dynamo won 4–2 on aggregate.

== Conference finals ==
=== Eastern Conference ===
November 8
7:30 pm EST

New England Revolution	1–0	Chicago Fire
Twellman 38'	Report

Gillette Stadium, Foxborough, Massachusetts
Attendance: 10,317
Referee: Kevin Stott

=== Western Conference ===
November 10
7:30 pm CST

Houston Dynamo	2–0	Kansas City Wizards
Jaqua 35'; De Rosario 81'	Report

Robertson Stadium, Houston, Texas
Attendance: 30,972
Referee: Jair Marrufo

== MLS Cup 2007 ==
November 18, 2007
12:00 pm EST

New England Revolution	1–2	Houston Dynamo
Twellman 20'	Report	Ngwenya 61'; De Rosario 74'

RFK Stadium, Washington, D.C.
Attendance: 39,859
Referee: Alex Prus
