= Javier Yacuzzi =

Argentine footballer (1979–2023)

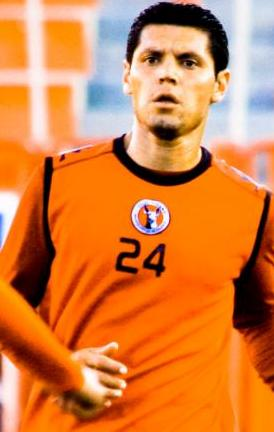

Personal information
- Full name: Javier Orlando Yacuzzi
- Date of birth: 15 August 1979
- Place of birth: San Nicolás de los Arroyos, Argentina
- Date of death: 29 May 2023 (aged 43)
- Place of death: Querétaro, Mexico
- Height: 1.70 m (5 ft 7 in)
- Position: Defender

Senior career*
Years	Team	Apps	(Gls)
2001–2002	Platense	12	(1)
2002–2003	Tigre	33	(4)
2003–2004	Gimnasia (CdU)	30	(3)
2004–2005	Tiro Federal	29	(1)
2005–2010	Arsenal de Sarandí	149	(11)
2010–2011	Tijuana	35	(3)
2012	Huracan	16	(1)
2012–2013	Rosario Central	10	(0)
2013–2016	Defensa y Justicia	11	(0)
2016	General Rojo Unión Deportiva		
2017	Matienzo (Villa Ramallo)		
2018	Club Somisa (San Nicolás)		

Managerial career
- 2022: Defensa y Justicia Reserves
- 2022–2023: Querétaro (Assistant)
- * Club domestic league appearances and goals

Javier Orlando Yacuzzi (15 August 1979 – 29 May 2023) was an Argentine football player and coach.

== Honours ==
Arsenal de Sarandí

- Copa Sudamericana: 2007
- Suruga Bank Championship: 2008

== Personal life ==
Yacuzzi died from a virus in Querétaro, Mexico on 29 May 2023, at the age of 43.
