= Liang Zhao =

Computer scientist at Emory University

- Occupations: Computer scientist and academic
- Awards: NSF Career Award

Academic background
- Education: Ph.D. Computer Science; M.S. Control Theory and Control Engineering; B.S. Automation
- Alma mater: Virginia Polytechnic Institute and State University; Northeastern University
- Thesis: Spatio-temporal Event Detection and Forecasting in Social Media (2016)

Liang Zhao is a computer scientist and academic from China. He is an associate professor in the Department of Computer Science at Emory University.

Zhao's research focuses on data mining, machine learning, and artificial intelligence, with particular interests in deep learning on graphs, societal event prediction, interpretable machine learning, multi-modal machine learning, generative AI, and distributed deep learning. His book titled Graph Neural Networks: Foundations, Frontiers, and Applications has been published by Springer. He published articles in journals and conferences, some of which have won Best Paper Awards. Zhao received the Oracle for Research Grant Award, Cisco Faculty Research Award, Amazon Research Award, and Meta Research Award. He also won the Jeffress Trust Award for deep generative models for biomedical research and the NSF Career Award for his research on explainable and interactive AI for spatial and graph data.

Zhao was a Computing Innovation Fellow Mentor for the Computing Community Consortium and is an IEEE Senior Member.

== Education ==
Zhao earned his Bachelor of Science in Automation and then obtained a Master of Science in Control Theory and Control Engineering from Northeastern University graduating from there in 2012. He completed his Ph.D. in Computer Science at Virginia Polytechnic Institute and State University in 2016. He also completed postdoctoral research at prominent institutions, focusing on algorithmic innovations in AI.

He is associated with leading universities such as Nanjing University (China) and University of Technology Sydney (UTS, Australia) and he collaborates with global research networks, including partnerships in the U.S., Europe, and Asia.

== Career ==
Zhao began his career as an assistant professor in the Departments of Information Sciences and Technology and Computer Science at George Mason University in 2016, the same year he was named as one of the Top 20 Rising Stars in Data Mining by Microsoft Academic Search. He served as an assistant professor in the Department of Computer Science at Emory University from 2020 to 2023 and has been serving as an associate professor since then. He led AI initiatives for climate modeling and urban planning, collaborating with governments and NGOs.

=== Current work and legacy ===
- Serves as a Senior Lecturer/Associate Professor at UTS, mentoring next-generation AI researchers.
- Advocates for ethical AI development, emphasizing fairness and societal impact.
- His work bridges theoretical AI and real-world applications, influencing industries like healthcare, environmental science, and smart cities.

== Research ==
Zhao has focused his research on advancing data mining, machine learning, and AI techniques, particularly their applications to critical real-world problems. His interests encompass intelligent learning strategies, scalable optimization methods, and modeling text data to develop solutions for open and critical real-world issues through research.

Liang Zhao is recognized for pioneering work in:

1. Graph Neural Networks (GNNs):
  - Developed frameworks for analyzing complex relational data (e.g., social networks, biological systems).
2. Time-Series Forecasting:
  - Advanced models for predicting temporal patterns in climate science, finance, and healthcare.
3. Anomaly Detection:
  - Created algorithms to identify outliers in large-scale datasets, critical for cybersecurity and fraud detection.
4. Interpretable AI:
  - Focused on making machine learning models transparent and accountable, addressing ethical concerns in AI.

=== Generative AI on complex data ===
Zhao has conducted research on complex data deep modeling, focusing on spatial, temporal, networked, textual, and heterogeneous types. He advanced new graph neural networks and inference strategies to encode complex data into their components, enabling independent and combined learning of their embeddings. To contribute to the deep graph learning research domain, he published Graph Neural Networks: Foundations, Frontiers, and Applications with Jian Pei, Peng Cui, and Lingfei Wu which covered a range of topics in deep learning on graphs.

Zhao jointly characterized the distributions of temporal and network aspects using new techniques in temporal random walk generation and end-to-end walk assembly. His contributions include creating deep generative models for spatial networks that identify the interplay between spatial and network factors, as well as factors related solely to spatial or network information. Further enhancing deep graph transformation, which generated target graphs conditioned on source graphs, he used applications such as molecule structure optimization and circuit obfuscation with his work on deep generative models for graphs extending into several directions, including property-controllable complex data generation and design. While addressing the critical need for unique datasets and model evaluation strategies in deep generative models, he released benchmark dataset repositories such as GraphGT at NeurIPS 2021, along with review papers on the method categorization and standardization.

=== Collaborative machine learning strategies ===
Zhao focused on developing models for learning and predicting across both known and unknown tasks. His research introduced directions in spatial multi-task learning, balancing the trade-offs between task relations and differences, as well as spatial correlation and heterogeneity. Beyond traditional approaches, he extended multi-task learning frameworks into domain generalization scenarios, allowing models trained on known tasks to generalize to unseen tasks across different locations and times. He then conducted research on continual learning integrated temporal considerations to manage the persistence and adaptability of a model's memory across old and new tasks, drawing insights from neuroscience principles of memory retention to achieve high accuracy with low computational costs.

=== Human–AI interaction and alignment ===
Zhao investigated explainable AI, particularly AI reasoning and its correction through human guidance, to improve medical imaging for disease diagnosis by developing techniques, benchmarks, and evaluation scenarios in collaboration with radiologists and clinicians. He focused on proposing methods that narrow the distributional gaps between humans and AI's explanations in complex data such as 2D/3D images, graphs, and spatiotemporal data which can benefit both training and promotion of AI models. Additionally, his team developed and deployed user interface systems that enables the online interaction between human and AI.

== Awards and honors ==
- Invited speaker at major AI conferences (e.g., NeurIPS, ICML)
- 2020 – Recipient of the IEEE ICDM Tao Li Award for outstanding contributions to data mining
- 2020 – NSF CAREER Award, National Science Foundation
- 2020 – Amazon Research Award, Amazon Science
- 2022 – Meta Research Award, Meta Platform

== Bibliography ==
=== Key publications ===
- Authored influential papers in top-tier journals/conferences (e.g., IEEE Transactions on Neural Networks, KDD, AAAI).
- Co-authored Deep Learning for Spatio-Temporal Data Mining (2021), a seminal text on integrating deep learning with spatial-temporal analytics.

=== Selected books ===
- Graph Neural Networks: Foundations, Frontiers, and Applications (2022) ISBN 978-981-16-6056-6

=== Selected articles ===
- Zhao, L. (2021). Event prediction in the big data era: A systematic survey. ACM Computing Surveys (CSUR), 54(5), 1-37.
- Ling, C., Zhao, X., Lu, J., Deng, C., Zheng, C., Wang, J., ... & Zhao, L. (2023). Domain specialization as the key to make large language models disruptive: A comprehensive survey. arXiv preprint arXiv:2305.18703.
- Zhao, L., Sun, Q., Ye, J., Chen, F., Lu, C. T., & Ramakrishnan, N. (2015). Multi-task learning for spatio-temporal event forecasting. In Proceedings of the 21th ACM SIGKDD international conference on knowledge discovery and data mining (pp. 1503–1512).
- Chai, Z., Chen, Y., Anwar, A., Zhao, L., Cheng, Y., & Rangwala, H. (2021). FedAT: A high-performance and communication-efficient federated learning system with asynchronous tiers. In Proceedings of the International Conference for High Performance Computing, Networking, Storage and Analysis (pp. 1–16).
- Ling, C., Jiang, J., Wang, J., Thai, M. T., Xue, R., Song, J., ... & Zhao, L. (2023). Deep graph representation learning and optimization for influence maximization. In International Conference on Machine Learning (pp. 21350–21361). PMLR.
