= Scott Sealy =

Trinidadian footballer (born 1981)

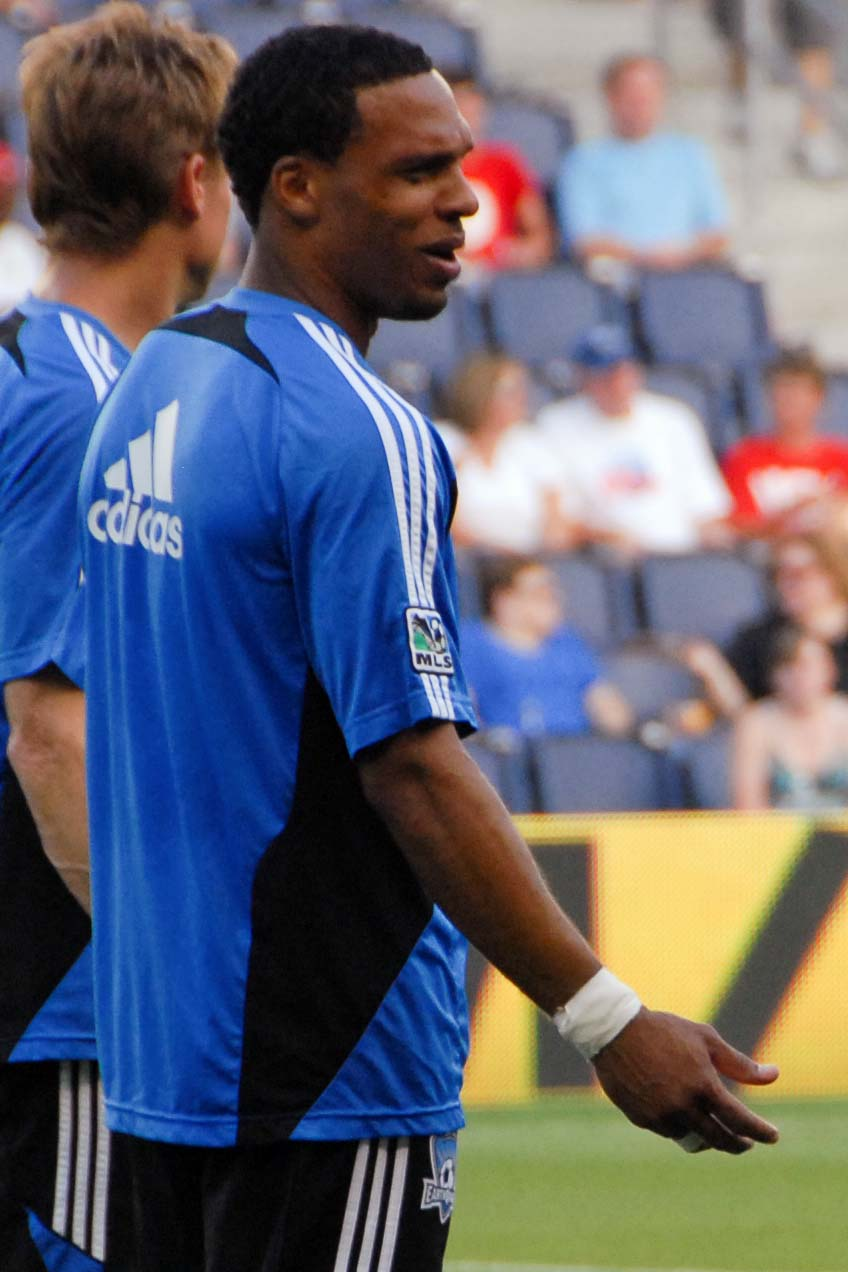
- Sealy with the San Jose Earthquakes in 2011

Personal information
- Full name: Scott Ryan Sealy
- Date of birth: 4 June 1981 (age 45)
- Place of birth: Chaguanas, Trinidad and Tobago
- Height: 5 ft 10 in (1.78 m)
- Position: Forward

College career
Years	Team	Apps	(Gls)
2001	St. Mary's College		
2001–2004	Wake Forest Demon Deacons		

Senior career*
Years	Team	Apps	(Gls)
2005–2008	Kansas City Wizards	88	(28)
2008	San Jose Earthquakes	14	(2)
2009	Maccabi Tel Aviv	14	(1)
2009–2010	Bnei Sakhnin	10	(0)
2010–2011	San Jose Earthquakes	26	(0)
2012	FC Dallas	16	(2)
Total		168	(33)

International career
2004–2012	Trinidad and Tobago	25	(2)
- * Club domestic league appearances and goals

Scott Ryan Sealy (born 4 June 1981, in Chaguanas) is a Trinidadian footballer who most recently played for FC Dallas in Major League Soccer and the father of Dante Sealy.

== Career ==
=== College ===
Sealy played college soccer at Wake Forest from 2001 to 2004, where he played in 83 games, starting 73. He scored 43 goals and 22 assists in his career, including 17 goals and 10 assists as a senior, when he was named a second team All-American.

=== Professional ===
After graduating from Wake Forest, Sealy was selected by Kansas City Wizards 11th overall in the 2005 MLS SuperDraft. After three and a half seasons with the Wizards, he was traded to San Jose Earthquakes on 14 July 2008 for an undisclosed amount of allocation money. After playing out the rest of the season with the Quakes, Sealy signed with Israeli side Maccabi Tel Aviv on 2 February 2009. On the same day, he entered as a second-half substitute against Maccabi Haifa, assisting on the equalising goal. On 7 February 2009, he scored the winning goal in his first start, putting the score at 2–1 away against Hapoel Kiryat Shmona.

Sealy returned to play for San Jose Earthquakes in early April 2010 and after an injury first half of the season, put in strong displays in midfield to give San Jose a push for playoffs. Sealy remained with San Jose through the 2011 season. At season's end, the club declined his 2012 contract option and he entered the 2011 MLS Re-Entry Draft. Sealy was not selected in the draft and became a free agent.

Sealy signed a contract with FC Dallas for 2012 season. After the conclusion of the 2012 season, Dallas declined the 2013 option on Sealy's contract and he entered the 2012 MLS Re-Entry Draft. Sealy became a free agent after he went undrafted in both rounds of the draft.

=== International ===
Sealy represented Trinidad and Tobago national team at the international level. He scored on his international debut after coming on as a substitute against Dominican Republic. Sealy's last national team appearance came in 2008.

== Honours ==
- Toto Cup:
  - 2008/09

== Career statistics ==
Club performance			League		Cup		League Cup		Continental		Total	
Season	Club	League	Apps	Goals	Apps	Goals	Apps	Goals	Apps	Goals	Apps	Goals
USA			League		Open Cup		League Cup		North America		Total	
2005	Kansas City Wizards	MLS	28	9	2	1	-	-	-	-	30	10
2006	Kansas City Wizards	MLS	29	10	1	1	-	-	-	-	30	11
2007	Kansas City Wizards	MLS	18	7	1	0	3	0	-	-	22	7
2008	Kansas City Wizards	MLS	13	2	1	0	-	-	-	-	14	2
2008	San Jose Earthquakes	MLS	14	3	-	-	-	-	-	-	14	3
Israel			League		Israel State Cup		Toto Cup		Europe		Total	
2009	Maccabi Tel Aviv	Ligat ha'Al	14	1	1	0	1	0	0	0	16	1
2009–10	Bnei Sakhnin	Ligat ha'Al	10	0	0	0	0	0	0	0	10	0
USA			League		Open Cup		League Cup		North America		Total	
2010	San Jose Earthquakes	MLS	15	0	-	-	3	0	-	-	15	0
2011	San Jose Earthquakes	MLS	11	0	1	0	-	-	-	-	12	0
2012	FC Dallas	MLS	0	0	-	-	-	-	-	-	0	0
Total	USA		128	31	6	2	3	0	-	-	137	33
Total	Israel		24	1	1	0	1	0	0	0	26	1
Career total			152	32	7	2	1	0	-	-	163	34

=== International goals ===
Scores and results list Trinidad and Tobago's goal tally first.

#	Date	Venue	Opponent	Score	Result	Competition
1.	20 June 2004	Manny Ramjohn Stadium, Marabella, Trinidad and Tobago	Dominican Republic	4–0	4–0	2006 FIFA World Cup qualification
2.	21 January 2005	Hasely Crawford Stadium, Port of Spain, Trinidad and Tobago	Azerbaijan	1–0	1–0	Friendly
Correct as of 14 August 2013
