= Sergio Valenti =

Argentine footballer

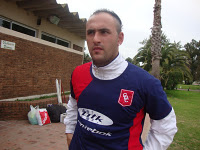

Personal information
- Full name: Sergio Damián Valenti
- Date of birth: June 30, 1985 (age 41)
- Place of birth: La Plata, Argentina
- Height: 1.83 m (6 ft 0 in)
- Position: Forward

Team information
- Current team: A.S.D. Coghinas Calcio

Youth career
- Gimnasia LP

Senior career*
Years	Team	Apps	(Gls)
2004–2005	Gimnasia LP	21	(2)
2006	Talleres	12	(2)
2006	Irapuato	14	(5)
2007	Gimnasia LP	1	(0)
2007	Defensor Sporting	4	(1)
2008	Ben Hur	16	(4)
2009	Curicó Unido	11	(1)
2010–1011	Villa San Carlos	21	(0)
2011–2012	Cambaceres	36	(15)
2012–2014	UAI Urquiza	51	(9)
2014	Berazategui	15	(2)
2015–2017	Argentino de Quilmes	92	(48)
2017–2018	Excursionistas	28	(8)
2018–2019	San Martín Burzaco	16	(2)
2019–2021	Ilvamaddalena 1903		
2021–	Tempio		
- * Club domestic league appearances and goals

Sergio Damián Valenti (born 30 June 1985, in La Plata) is an Argentine footballer, who currently plays for Italian Promozione side Coghinas Calcio.
