= Carlos Casteglione =

Argentine footballer

Personal information
- Full name: Carlos Damián Casteglione
- Date of birth: May 9, 1980 (age 46)
- Place of birth: Avellaneda, Argentina
- Height: 1.81 m (5 ft 11 in)
- Positions: Centre back; defensive midfielder

Team information
- Current team: Juventud Universitario

Youth career
- 2000–2002: Arsenal de Sarandí

Senior career*
Years	Team	Apps	(Gls)
2002–2009	Arsenal de Sarandí	202	(15)
2009–2010	Panionios	15	(1)
2010–2011	All Boys	27	(1)
2011–2012	Tigre	27	(1)
2012–2013	Rosario Central	17	(0)
2013–2014	All Boys	34	(1)
2014–2015	Defensa y Justicia	9	(0)
2015–	Juventud Universitario	1	(0)
- * Club domestic league appearances and goals as of 30 March 2015

Carlos Damián Casteglione (sometimes spelt Casteglioni; born on 9 May 1980, in Avellaneda, Buenos Aires Province) is an Argentine football defender or defensive midfielder who plays for Juventud Universitario in Torneo Argentino A.

== Career ==
Casteglione started his career in 2002 with Arsenal de Sarandí. He had a short spell in 2004 on loan with Juventud Unida Universitario in the regionalised Argentine third division.

After his loan spell he returned to Arsenal and played for the club during the most successful period in its history. In 2006-07 he helped Arsenal to qualify for the Copa Libertadores for the first time in the club's history.

In 2007, he was the captain of the Arsenal team that won the Copa Sudamericana, but he missed the second leg of the final due to a red card in the first leg in the Azteca stadium. In 2008, Casteglione scored Arsenal's winning goal in the Suruga Bank Championship.

After several years service as the Arsenal club captain, Casteglione joined the Greek club Panionios F.C. in 2009 on a 1-year loan deal. He returned to Argentina in June 2010 to join recently promoted first division team All Boys.

== Honours ==
Season	Club	Title
2007	Arsenal de Sarandí	Copa Sudamericana
2008	Arsenal de Sarandí	Suruga Bank Championship
2012–13	Rosario Central	Primera B Nacional
