= Christian Gómez =

Argentine footballer

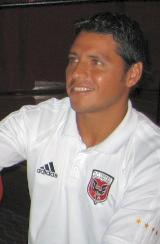

Personal information
- Date of birth: 7 November 1974 (age 51)
- Place of birth: Buenos Aires, Argentina
- Height: 5 ft 8 in (1.73 m)
- Position: Midfielder

Senior career*
Years	Team	Apps	(Gls)
1991–1997	Nueva Chicago	155	(46)
1997–1999	Independiente	80	(12)
2000	Argentinos Juniors	7	(0)
2000–2002	Nueva Chicago	63	(14)
2002	Independiente	10	(1)
2003–2004	Arsenal de Sarandí	30	(6)
2004–2007	D.C. United	97	(39)
2008	Colorado Rapids	20	(3)
2009	D.C. United	27	(6)
2010	Miami FC	25	(6)
2011–2019	Nueva Chicago	192	(47)
Total		706	(180)
- * Club domestic league appearances and goals

Christian Gómez (born 7 November 1974) is an Argentine former professional footballer who played as a midfielder.

== Career ==
=== Argentina ===
Gómez began playing professional soccer at the age of 17 with Argentine club Nueva Chicago, which was at the time playing in the second division. He played with the team from 1991 to 1997, appearing in 155 games and scoring 46 goals. In 1997, Gómez moved to one of Argentina's largest and most successful clubs, CA Independiente, which he would play for from 1997 to 1999, scoring 12 goals in 80 games. He moved to Argentinos Juniors, where he would finish out the second half of 1999–2000 season. Gómez then returned to Nueva Chicago, where he would help the team earn promotion to the first division, while scoring 14 goals in 63 games. He then briefly returned to Independiente in 2002, before moving to Arsenal de Sarandí, where he would play in 30 games, scoring 6 goals, between 2003 and 2004.

=== United States ===
Gómez signed with D.C. United of MLS on 14 August 2004 who had been interested in him for several years, and he played his first match for the club on 21 August 2004. Gómez played nine regular season games for United, catalyzing the offense while teaming very well with Jaime Moreno, and finished the season with four goals. He then helped them to the MLS Cup. In 2005, Gómez scored 11 goals and 9 assists and was named to the MLS Best XI. In 2006 Gómez won the MLS MVP award. In the 2007 MLS season, Gomez played in 27 games (27 starts) and compiled 10 goals and 9 assists. Gomez was named MLS All-Star in 2005, 2006 and 2007.

He was traded to the Colorado Rapids for the 2008 season in exchange of a Designated Player sport and a first round pick in the 2009 MLS SuperDraft. However, his season with the Rapids was disappointing.

He was traded back to D.C. United for the 2009 season. After playing with United in 2009, it was reported on 1 February 2010, that Gomez would not return to United for the 2010 season. He subsequently signed with USSF Division 2 club Miami FC on 25 March 2010.

== Honors ==
=== D.C. United ===
- Major League Soccer MLS Cup: 2004
- Major League Soccer Supporter's Shield: 2006, 2007

=== Individual ===
- Major League Soccer MVP: 2006
- MLS Best XI: 2005, 2006, 2007
