= Clyde Simms =

American former soccer player (born 1982)

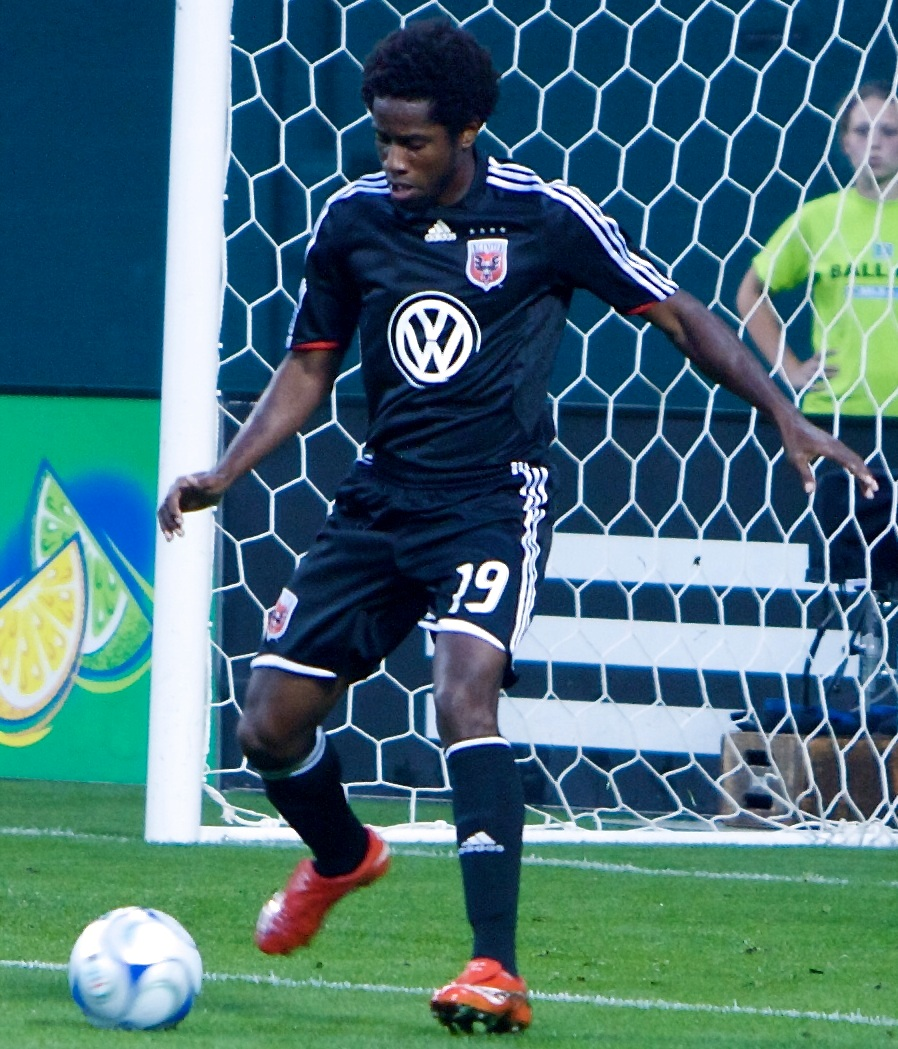

Personal information
- Full name: Clyde Simms
- Date of birth: August 21, 1982 (age 44)
- Place of birth: Jamestown, North Carolina, United States
- Height: 5 ft 9 in (1.75 m)
- Position: Defensive midfielder

College career
Years	Team	Apps	(Gls)
2000–2003	East Carolina Pirates	72	(7)

Senior career*
Years	Team	Apps	(Gls)
2003	Raleigh CASL Elite	17	(2)
2004	Richmond Kickers	26	(3)
2005–2011	D.C. United	182	(3)
2012–2013	New England Revolution	39	(0)
Total		264	(8)

International career^{‡}
2005	United States	1	(0)
- * Club domestic league appearances and goals as of November 22, 2013 ‡ National team caps and goals as of March 30, 2009

Clyde Simms (born August 21, 1982) is an American former professional soccer player. He played in Major League Soccer from 2005 to 2013. He also represented the United States at international level.

== Career ==
=== College ===
Born in Jamestown, North Carolina, Simms attended Southwest Guilford High School in High Point, North Carolina. Simms played college soccer at East Carolina University from 2000 to 2003, where he appeared in 72 games and notched seven goals and seven assists. He was team captain during his final three years.

=== Professional ===
Simms went undrafted by Major League Soccer after college and instead signed with Richmond Kickers of the A-League. Although he had a relatively impressive first season with the Kickers and started 28 games for the club, Simms's talent was not really recognized until he was called into the United States national team camp as a replacement player due to a conflict between the United States Soccer Federation and the players in 2005. Simms greatly impressed in camp and, when the disagreement was settled, Simms was asked to remain in camp and train with the regular team.

Simms's performance in the national camp intrigued several MLS teams, and he was eventually signed as a discovery player by D.C. United on February 25, 2005. In the 2008 MLS season, Simms played in 30 MLS games, with 30 starts and two goals scored and two assists. He missed only 3 minutes the entire season.

After seven seasons with D.C. United, the club declined his 2012 contract option and he entered the 2011 MLS Re-Entry Draft. Simms was selected by New England Revolution in stage two of the draft on December 12, 2011. He agreed a contract with New England eleven days later.

Simms played two seasons for New England. He announced his retirement on February 13, 2014.

=== International ===
Simms has one cap for United States national team, which he received on May 28, 2005, when he came on as an injury-time substitute against England.

== Honors ==
=== D.C. United ===
- Major League Soccer Supporter's Shield (2): 2006, 2007
- Lamar Hunt U.S. Open Cup (1): 2008

=== NC Hall of Fame ===
- Inducted into the NC Soccer Hall of Fame on January 24, 2015
