= 2007 Major League Soccer season =

12th season of Major League Soccer

Major League Soccer
- Season: 2007
- Teams: 13
- MLS Cup: Houston Dynamo (2nd title)
- Supporters' Shield: D.C. United (4th shield)
- 2008-09 CONCACAF Champions League: Houston Dynamo; D.C. United; N.E. Revolution; Chivas USA
- 2008 SuperLiga: D.C. United; Chivas USA; Houston Dynamo; N.E. Revolution
- 2008 CONCACAF Champions' Cup: Houston Dynamo; D.C. United
- Matches: 195
- Goals: 518 (2.66 per match)
- Top goalscorer: Luciano Emilio; D.C. United; Goals: 20
- Biggest home win: CHV 4–0 RSL; NY 4–0 CLB; TOR 4–0 FCD
- Biggest away win: CHI 0–4 HOU; FCD 0–4 DCU
- Highest scoring: NY 5–4 LA
- Longest winning run: D.C. United; Games: 6 (08/05/ – 09/01)
- Longest unbeaten run: D.C. United; Games: 13 (08/05 – 10/13)
- Longest losing run: Los Angeles Galaxy; Games: 6 (08/09 – 09/01)
- Highest attendance: Los Angeles Galaxy; Season: 363,782; Game Avg.: 24,252
- Lowest attendance: Kansas City Wizards; Season:173,784; Game Avg.: 11,586
- Total attendance: 3,270,210
- Average attendance: 16,770

Locations of teams for the 2007 Major League Soccer season
Western Conference Eastern Conference

The 2007 Major League Soccer season was the 12th season of Major League Soccer. It was also the 95th season of FIFA-sanctioned soccer in the United States, and the 29th with a national first-division league.

This year marked the inaugural season for expansion franchise, Toronto FC who began play in the Eastern Conference. Two new soccer-specific stadiums opened as well. The Colorado Rapids moved into Dick's Sporting Goods Park in the Denver-suburb of Commerce City and, before the season began, BMO Field opened for expansion side, Toronto FC.

This season is often cited as the first in the modern-era of Major League Soccer because of the introduction of the Designated Player Rule which permitted each team to sign one big-ticket player without it counting against the salary cap. Six such players were signed for the 2007 season: David Beckham, Cuauhtémoc Blanco, Juan Pablo Ángel, Luciano Emilio, Denílson and Guillermo Barros Schelotto.

The regular season began on April 7, and concluded on October 21. The 2007 MLS Cup Playoffs began on October 25, and concluded with MLS Cup 2007 on November 18. For the first time in league history, the same two clubs consecutively won the MLS Cup and the Supporters' Shield. The Houston Dynamo repeated as MLS Cup Champions by defeating the New England Revolution in the final and D.C. United won the Supporters' Shield by edging Chivas USA by two points in the standings.

== Overview ==
=== Season format ===
The season began on April 7 and concluded with MLS Cup on November 18. The 13 teams were split into two conferences with 7 playing the Eastern Conference and 6 playing in the Western Conference. Each team played 30 games that were evenly divided between home and away. Each team played every other team twice, home and away, for a total of 26 games. The remaining four games were played against four regional rivals, two at home and two away.

The top three teams from each conference automatically qualified for the MLS Cup Playoffs. In addition, the two highest remaining point totals, regardless of conference, also qualified. In the first round, aggregate goals over two matches determined the winners. The conference finals were played as a single match, and the winners advanced to MLS Cup. In all rounds, draws were broken with two 15-minute periods of extra time, followed by penalty kicks if necessary. The away goals rule was not used in any round.

The team with the most points in the regular season was awarded the MLS Supporters' Shield and qualified for the CONCACAF Champions' Cup. Additionally, the winner of MLS Cup also qualified for the CONCACAF Champions' Cup. If a team qualified for multiple berths into the Champions' Cup, then additional berths were awarded to the highest overall finishing MLS team(s) not already qualified. Also, Toronto FC, as a Canadian-based team, could not qualify for the CONCACAF Champions League through MLS, and had to instead qualify through the Canadian Championship.

Automatic qualification for the U.S. Open Cup was awarded to the top three finishers in each conference. The rest of the U.S.-based MLS teams had to qualify for the remaining two berths via a series of play-in games.

Qualification for the SuperLiga was determined by the overall table with the top four overall finishers qualifying for the 2008 edition.

=== Stadiums and locations ===
Team	Stadium	Capacity
Chicago Fire	Toyota Park	20,000
Chivas USA	Home Depot Center	27,000
Colorado Rapids	Dick's Sporting Goods Park	18,061
Columbus Crew	Columbus Crew Stadium	22,555
D.C. United	RFK Stadium	46,000
FC Dallas	Pizza Hut Park	21,193
Houston Dynamo	Robertson Stadium	32,000
Kansas City Wizards	Arrowhead Stadium	81,425
LA Galaxy	Home Depot Center	27,000
New England Revolution	Gillette Stadium	68,756
New York Red Bulls	Giants Stadium	80,200
Real Salt Lake	Rice-Eccles Stadium	45,017
Toronto FC	BMO Field	21,566

=== Personnel and sponsorships ===
Team	Head coach	Captain	Shirt sponsor
Chicago Fire	(Colombia) Juan Carlos Osorio		—
Chivas USA	(United States) Preki		Comex
Colorado Rapids	(United States) Fernando Clavijo		—
Columbus Crew	(United States) Sigi Schmid	(United States) Frankie Hejduk	—
D.C. United	(United States) Tom Soehn		—
FC Dallas	(Northern Ireland) Steve Morrow		—
Houston Dynamo	(United States) Dominic Kinnear	(United States) Wade Barrett	—
Kansas City Wizards	(United States) Curt Onalfo		—
LA Galaxy	(Canada) Frank Yallop		Herbalife
New England Revolution	(Scotland) Steve Nicol		—
New York Red Bulls	(United States) Bruce Arena	(United States) Claudio Reyna	Red Bull
Real Salt Lake	(United States) Jason Kreis	(United States) Eddie Pope	—
Toronto FC	(Scotland) Mo Johnston		—

=== Coaching changes ===
Team	Outgoing coach	Manner of departure	Date of vacancy	Incoming coach	Date of appointment
Chicago Fire	(United States) Dave Sarachan	Fired	June 20, 2007	(Colombia) Juan Carlos Osorio	July 1, 2007
Real Salt Lake	(United States) John Ellinger	Fired	May 3, 2007	(United States) Jason Kreis	May 3, 2007

== Standings ==
=== Eastern Conference ===
Pos	Team	Pld	W	L	T	GF	GA	GD	Pts	Qualification
1	D.C. United	30	16	7	7	56	34	+22	55	MLS Cup Playoffs
2	New England Revolution	30	14	8	8	51	43	+8	50	MLS Cup Playoffs
3	New York Red Bulls	30	12	11	7	47	45	+2	43	MLS Cup Playoffs
4	Chicago Fire	30	10	10	10	31	36	−5	40	MLS Cup Playoffs
5	Kansas City Wizards	30	11	12	7	45	45	0	40	MLS Cup Playoffs
6	Columbus Crew	30	9	11	10	39	44	−5	37	
7	Toronto FC	30	6	17	7	25	49	−24	25	

Source: MLS

=== Western Conference ===
Pos	Team	Pld	W	L	T	GF	GA	GD	Pts	Qualification
1	Chivas USA	30	15	7	8	46	28	+18	53	MLS Cup Playoffs
2	Houston Dynamo	30	15	8	7	43	23	+20	52	MLS Cup Playoffs
3	FC Dallas	30	13	12	5	37	44	−7	44	MLS Cup Playoffs
4	Colorado Rapids	30	9	13	8	29	34	−5	35	
5	LA Galaxy	30	9	14	7	38	48	−10	34	
6	Real Salt Lake	30	6	15	9	31	45	−14	27	

Source: MLS

=== Overall standings ===
Pos	Team	Pld	W	L	T	GF	GA	GD	Pts	Qualification
1	D.C. United (S)	30	16	7	7	56	34	+22	55	CONCACAF Champions' Cup
2	Chivas USA	30	15	7	8	46	28	+18	53	North American SuperLiga
3	Houston Dynamo (C)	30	15	8	7	43	23	+20	52	CONCACAF Champions' Cup
4	New England Revolution	30	14	8	8	51	43	+8	50	North American SuperLiga
5	FC Dallas	30	13	12	5	37	44	−7	44	
6	New York Red Bulls	30	12	11	7	47	45	+2	43	
7	Chicago Fire	30	10	10	10	31	36	−5	40	
8	Kansas City Wizards	30	11	12	7	45	45	0	40	
9	Columbus Crew	30	9	11	10	39	44	−5	37	
10	Colorado Rapids	30	9	13	8	29	34	−5	35	
11	LA Galaxy	30	9	14	7	38	48	−10	34	
12	Real Salt Lake	30	6	15	9	31	45	−14	27	
13	Toronto FC	30	6	17	7	25	49	−24	25	

Source: MLS
Rules for classification: 1) points; 2) head-to-head record; 3) goal difference; 4) number of goals scored
(C) Champions; (S) Supporters' Shield

== MLS Cup playoffs ==
=== Bracket ===
Conference semifinals
E1	D.C. United	0	2
WC	Chicago Fire	1	2
Eastern Conference
WC	New York Red Bulls	0	0
E2	New England Revolution	0	1
W1	Chivas USA	0	0
WC	Kansas City Wizards^{1}	1	0
Western Conference
WC	FC Dallas	1	1
W2	Houston Dynamo (a.e.t.)	0	4

Conference finals
WC	Chicago Fire	0
E2	New England Revolution	1
WC	Kansas City Wizards	0
W2	Houston Dynamo	2

MLS Cup
E2	New England Revolution	1
W2	Houston Dynamo	2

^{1} The Kansas City Wizards earned the eighth and final playoff berth, despite finishing fifth in the Eastern Conference. They represented the fourth seed in the Western Conference playoff bracket, as only three teams in the Western Conference qualified for the playoffs.

== Player statistics ==
=== Goals ===
Rank	Player	Club	Goals
1	(Brazil) Luciano Emilio	D.C. United	20
2	(Colombia) Juan Pablo Ángel	New York Red Bulls	19
3	(United States) Taylor Twellman	New England Revolution	16
4	(United States) Eddie Johnson	Kansas City Wizards	15
5	(Cuba) Maykel Galindo	Chivas USA	12
6	(United States) Ante Razov	Chivas USA	11
7	(Argentina) Christian Gómez	D.C. United	10
8	(United States) Jozy Altidore	New York Red Bulls	9
9	(United States) Landon Donovan	LA Galaxy	8
9	(United States) Robbie Findley	Real Salt Lake	8

=== Assists ===
Rank	Player	Club	Assists
1	(United States) Landon Donovan	LA Galaxy	11
1	(United States) Steve Ralston	New England Revolution	11
3	(United States) Davy Arnaud	Kansas City Wizards	9
3	(Argentina) Guillermo Barros Schelotto	Columbus Crew	9
3	(United States) Sacha Kljestan	Chivas USA	9
6	(Mexico) Cuauhtémoc Blanco	Chicago Fire	7
6	(Argentina) Christian Gómez	D.C. United	7
6	(Venezuela) Alejandro Moreno	Columbus Crew	7
9	(United States) Eddie Gaven	Columbus Crew	6
9	(United States) Stuart Holden	Houston Dynamo	6
9	(United States) Dax McCarty	FC Dallas	6

=== Clean sheets ===
Rank	Player	Club	Clean sheets
1	(United States) Brad Guzan	Chivas USA	13
2	(Canada) Pat Onstad	Houston Dynamo	11
3	(United States) Matt Pickens	Chicago Fire	10
3	(United States) Matt Reis	New England Revolution	10
5	(Senegal) Bouna Coundoul	Colorado Rapids	9
6	(United States) Troy Perkins	D.C. United	8
7	(United States) Nick Rimando	Real Salt Lake	7
8	(United States) Joe Cannon	LA Galaxy	5
8	(United States) Jon Conway	New York Red Bulls	5
8	(United States) Kevin Hartman	Kansas City Wizards	5
8	(United States) Will Hesmer	Columbus Crew	5
8	(Argentina) Darío Sala	FC Dallas	5
8	(Netherlands) Ronald Waterreus	New York Red Bulls	5

== Awards ==
=== Individual awards ===
Award	Player	Club
Most Valuable Player	(Brazil) Luciano Emilio	D.C. United
Defender of the Year	(United States) Michael Parkhurst	New England Revolution
Goalkeeper of the Year	(United States) Brad Guzan	Chivas USA
Coach of the Year	(United States) Preki	Chivas USA
Rookie of the Year	(United States) Maurice Edu	Toronto FC
Newcomer of the Year	(Brazil) Luciano Emilio	D.C. United
Comeback Player of the Year	(United States) Eddie Johnson	Kansas City Wizards
Golden Boot	(Brazil) Luciano Emilio	D.C. United
Goal of the Year	(Mexico) Cuauhtémoc Blanco	Chicago Fire
Fair Play Award	(United States) Michael Parkhurst	New England Revolution
Humanitarian of the Year	(United States) Diego Gutiérrez	Chicago Fire

=== Best XI ===
Goalkeeper	Defenders	Midfielders	Forwards
(United States) Brad Guzan, Chivas USA	(United States) Michael Parkhurst, New England (United States) Eddie Robinson, Houston Dynamo (United States) Jonathan Bornstein, Chivas USA	(Argentina) Christian Gómez, D.C. United (Grenada) Shalrie Joseph, New England (Canada) Dwayne De Rosario, Houston Dynamo (United States) Ben Olsen, D.C. United (Argentina) Guillermo Barros Schelotto, Columbus	(Brazil) Luciano Emílio, D.C. United (Colombia) Juan Pablo Ángel, New York Red Bulls

=== Player of the Month ===
Week	Player	Club
April	(United States) Eddie Johnson	Kansas City Wizards
May	(Colombia) Juan Pablo Ángel	New York Red Bulls
June	(Colombia) Juan Pablo Ángel	New York Red Bulls
July	(Argentina) Guillermo Barros Schelotto	Columbus Crew
August	(United States) Troy Perkins	D.C. United
September	(Brazil) Luciano Emilio	D.C. United
October	(United States) Matt Pickens	Chicago Fire

=== Weekly awards ===
Player of the Week
Week	Player	Club
Week 1	(United States) Jeff Cunningham	Real Salt Lake
Week 2	(United States) Eddie Johnson	Kansas City Wizards
Week 3	(Cuba) Maykel Galindo	Chivas USA
Week 4	(United States) Landon Donovan	Los Angeles Galaxy
Week 5	(Canada) Dwayne De Rosario	Houston Dynamo
Week 6	(United States) Taylor Twellman	New England Revolution
Week 7	(Colombia) Juan Pablo Ángel	New York Red Bulls
Week 8	(United States) Eddie Johnson	Kansas City Wizards
Week 9	(United States) Eddie Johnson	Kansas City Wizards
Week 10	(United States) Ben Olsen	D.C. United
Week 11	(Brazil) Luciano Emilio	D.C. United
Week 12	(United States) Brad Davis	Houston Dynamo
Week 13	(Jamaica) Nicholas Addlery	D.C. United
Week 14	(United States) Stuart Holden	Houston Dynamo
Week 15	(Colombia) Juan Toja	FC Dallas
Week 16	(Argentina) Guillermo Barros Schelotto	Columbus Crew
Week 17	(United States) Ante Razov	Chivas USA
Week 18	(Brazil) Luciano Emilio	D.C. United
Week 19	(Colombia) Juan Pablo Ángel	New York Red Bulls
Week 20	(United States) Jozy Altidore	New York Red Bulls
Week 21	(Cuba) Maykel Galindo	Chivas USA
Week 22	(United States) Ben Olsen	D.C. United
Week 23	(Brazil) Luciano Emilio	D.C. United
Week 24	(Trinidad and Tobago) Scott Sealy	Kansas City Wizards
Week 25	(United States) Ante Razov	Chivas USA
Week 26	(Brazil) Fred	D.C. United
Week 27	(United States) Abe Thompson	FC Dallas
Week 28	(Argentina) Guillermo Barros Schelotto	Columbus Crew
Week 29	(Trinidad and Tobago) Scott Sealy	Kansas City Wizards

Goal of the Week
Week	Player	Club
Week 1	(United States) Sacha Kljestan	Chivas USA
Week 2	(United States) Herculez Gomez	Colorado Rapids
Week 3	(United States) Jozy Altidore	New York Red Bulls
Week 4	(United States) Taylor Twellman	New England Revolution
Week 5	(United States) Chris Brown	Real Salt Lake
Week 6	(England) Danny Dichio	Toronto FC
Week 7	(Liberia) Chris Gbandi	FC Dallas
Week 8	(Canada) Jim Brennan	Toronto FC
Week 9	(England) Danny Dichio	Toronto FC
Week 10	(United States) Ben Olsen	D.C. United
Week 11	(Colombia) Juan Pablo Ángel	New York Red Bulls
Week 12	(United States) Brad Davis	Houston Dynamo
Week 13	(Cuba) Maykel Galindo	Chivas USA
Week 14	(United States) Stuart Holden	Houston Dynamo
Week 15	(Zimbabwe) Joseph Ngwenya	Houston Dynamo
Week 16	(Canada) Dwayne De Rosario	Houston Dynamo
Week 17	(United States) Kerry Zavagnin	Kansas City Wizards
Week 18	(United States) Robbie Findley	Real Salt Lake
Week 19	(United States) Jozy Altidore	New York Red Bulls
Week 20	(Mexico) Cuauhtémoc Blanco	Chicago Fire
Week 21	(Bolivia) Jaime Moreno	D.C. United
Week 22	(United States) Eddie Johnson	Kansas City Wizards
Week 23	(United States) Taylor Twellman	New England Revolution
Week 24	(Trinidad and Tobago) Scott Sealy	Kansas City Wizards
Week 25	(United States) Chris Rolfe	Chicago Fire
Week 26	(Brazil) Luciano Emilio	D.C. United
Week 27	(Brazil) Paulo Nagamura	Chivas USA
Week 28	(United States) Edson Buddle	Los Angeles Galaxy
Week 29	(England) Danny Dichio	Toronto FC

== Attendance ==
Club	Games	Season	Game Avg.
LA Galaxy	15	363,782	24,252
D.C. United	15	314,506	20,967
Toronto FC	15	301,947	20,130
New England Revolution	15	251,132	16,742
New York Red Bulls	15	247,948	16,530
Chicago Fire	15	247,536	16,502
Real Salt Lake	15	239,395	15,960
Houston Dynamo	15	238,240	15,883
Columbus Crew	15	228,451	15,230
FC Dallas	15	227,182	15,145
Colorado Rapids	15	221,209	14,747
Chivas USA	15	214,578	14,305
Kansas City Wizards	15	173,784	11,586
OVERALL	195	3,269,690	16,768

== International competitions ==
=== CONCACAF Champions' Cup 2007 ===
(United States) D.C. United
Defeated (Honduras) Club Deportivo Olimpia in the Quarterfinals
Lost (Mexico) Club Deportivo Guadalajara in the Semifinals.

(United States) Houston Dynamo
Defeated (Costa Rica) Puntarenas FC in the Quarterfinals.
Lost (Mexico) C.F. Pachuca in the Semifinals.

=== SuperLiga 2007 ===
FC Dallas
Finished in fourth place and did not advance from
Group A after going 0-1-2 in group play.

D.C. United
Runner-up of Group B after going 1-1-1 in group play.
Lost to Los Angeles Galaxy in Semifinals.

Houston Dynamo
Winner of Group B after going 2-0-1 in group play.
Lost to C.F. Pachuca on penalty kicks in the Semifinals.

Los Angeles Galaxy
Winner of Group A after going 2-1-0 in group play.
Defeated D.C. United in the Semifinals
Lost to C.F. Pachuca on penalty kicks in the Final.

=== Copa Sudamericana 2007 ===
D.C. United
Lost to Club Deportivo Guadalajara on away goals in the Round of 16.

== Other competitions ==
=== 2007 Lamar Hunt U.S. Open Cup ===
Eight of the twelve U.S.-based MLS teams entered the tournament in the third round.

D.C. United
Lost to Harrisburg City Islanders in the third round.

Los Angeles Galaxy
Lost to Richmond Kickers in the third round.

Chicago Fire
Lost to Carolina RailHawks in the third round.

Houston Dynamo
Lost to Charleston Battery in the third round.

Chivas USA
Lost to Seattle Sounders (USL) in the third round

Colorado Rapids
Defeated California Victory in the third round.
Lost to Seattle Sounders (USL) in the Quarterfinals.

FC Dallas
Defeated Atlanta Silverbacks on penalty kicks in the third round,
Defeated Charleston Battery after extra time in the Quarterfinals,
Defeated Seattle Sounders (USL) after extra time in the Semifinals,
Lost to New England Revolution in the Final.

New England Revolution
Defeated Rochester Raging Rhinos in the third round.
Defeated Harrisburg City Islanders in the Quarterfinals.
Defeated Carolina RailHawks after extra time in the Semifinals.
Defeated FC Dallas in the Final.

=== All-Star game ===
The 2007 MLS All-Star Game was held at Dick's Sporting Goods Park
in Commerce City, Colorado, home of the Colorado Rapids on July 19.
The opponent was Celtic F.C. of the Scottish Premier League.

Final Score:
MLS All-Stars 2-0 Celtic F.C.
