= 1984 in Japan =

- Decades: 1960s; 1970s; 1980s; 1990s; 2000s
- See also: Other events of 1984; History of Japan • Timeline • Years

Events in the year 1984 in Japan.

== Incumbents ==
- Emperor: Hirohito (Emperor Shōwa)
- Prime Minister: Yasuhiro Nakasone (L–Gunma, 2nd term)
- Chief Cabinet Secretary: Takao Fujinami (L–Mie)
- Chief Justice of the Supreme Court: Jirō Terata
- President of the House of Representatives: Kenji Fukunaga (L–Saitama)
- President of the House of Councillors: Mutsuo Kimura (L–Okayama)
- Diet sessions: 101st (special session opened in December 1983, to August 8), 102nd (regular, December 1 through 1985, June 25)

=== Governors ===
- Aichi Prefecture: Reiji Suzuki
- Akita Prefecture: Kikuji Sasaki
- Aomori Prefecture: Masaya Kitamura
- Chiba Prefecture: Takeshi Numata
- Ehime Prefecture: Haruki Shiraishi
- Fukui Prefecture: Heidayū Nakagawa
- Fukuoka Prefecture: Hachiji Okuda
- Fukushima Prefecture: Isao Matsudaira
- Gifu Prefecture: Yosuke Uematsu
- Gunma Prefecture: Ichiro Shimizu
- Hiroshima Prefecture: Toranosuke Takeshita
- Hokkaido: Takahiro Yokomichi
- Hyogo Prefecture: Tokitada Sakai
- Ibaraki Prefecture: Fujio Takeuchi
- Ishikawa Prefecture: Yōichi Nakanishi
- Iwate Prefecture: Tadashi Nakamura
- Kagawa Prefecture: Tadao Maekawa
- Kagoshima Prefecture: Kaname Kamada
- Kanagawa Prefecture: Kazuji Nagasu
- Kochi Prefecture: Chikara Nakauchi
- Kumamoto Prefecture: Morihiro Hosokawa
- Kyoto Prefecture: Yukio Hayashida
- Mie Prefecture: Ryōzō Tagawa
- Miyagi Prefecture: Sōichirō Yamamoto
- Miyazaki Prefecture: Suketaka Matsukata
- Nagano Prefecture: Gorō Yoshimura
- Nagasaki Prefecture: Isamu Takada
- Nara Prefecture: Shigekiyo Ueda
- Niigata Prefecture: Takeo Kimi
- Oita Prefecture: Morihiko Hiramatsu
- Okayama Prefecture: Shiro Nagano
- Okinawa Prefecture: Junji Nishime
- Osaka Prefecture: Sakae Kishi
- Saga Prefecture: Kumao Katsuki
- Saitama Prefecture: Yawara Hata
- Shiga Prefecture: Masayoshi Takemura
- Shiname Prefecture: Seiji Tsunematsu
- Shizuoka Prefecture: Keizaburō Yamamoto
- Tochigi Prefecture: Yuzuru Funada (until 8 December); Fumio Watanabe (starting 9 December)
- Tokushima Prefecture: Shinzo Miki
- Tokyo: Shun'ichi Suzuki
- Tottori Prefecture: Yuji Nishio
- Toyama Prefecture: Yutaka Nakaoki
- Wakayama Prefecture: Shirō Kariya
- Yamagata Prefecture: Seiichirō Itagaki
- Yamaguchi Prefecture: Toru Hirai
- Yamanashi Prefecture: Kōmei Mochizuki

== Events ==
- January to March – 1984 Heavy snowfall in Japan, according to Fire and Disaster Management Agency confirmed report, 131 person fatalities, 1,366 are injures.
- January 18 – 83 are killed during an explosion at the Mitsui Miike coal mine in Ōmuta, Fukuoka.
- Glico Morinaga case
- Market Oriented Sector Selective talks
- June to July – A food poisoning occurs because mustard lotus root is infected with clostridium botulinum in Kumamoto. According to official confirmed report, resulting to 11 fatalities.
- July 1 – Foundation of the Management and Coordination Agency (1984-2001).
- September 13 – Otaki earthquake
- October 11 – Japan Telecom, as predecessor of SoftBank was founded.
- November 15 – According to Fire and Disaster Management Agency official confirmed report, a Mishima complex building caught fire in Matsuyama, Ehime Prefecture in Shikoku Island, eight persons were human fatalities.

== Popular culture ==
=== Arts and entertainment ===
In film, The Funeral by Juzo Itami won the Best film award at the Japan Academy Prize and at the Hochi Film Awards, MacArthur's Children by Masahiro Shinoda won Best film at the Blue Ribbon Awards and Mahjong hōrōki by Makoto Wada won Best film at the Yokohama Film Festival. For a list of Japanese films released in 1984 see Japanese films of 1984.

In manga, the winners of the Shogakukan Manga Award were Human Crossing by Masao Yajima and Kenshi Hirokane (general), Futari Daka and Area 88 by Kaoru Shintani (shōnen), Yume no Ishibumi by Toshie Kihara (shōjo) and Kinnikuman by Yudetamago (children). X+Y by Moto Hagio won the Seiun Award for Best Comic of the Year. For a list of manga released in 1984 see Category:1984 manga.

In music, the 35th Kōhaku Uta Gassen was won by the Red Team (women). Hiroshi Itsuki won the 26th Japan Record Awards, held on December 31, and the FNS Music Festival. For other music, see 1984 in Japanese music.

In television, see: 1984 in Japanese television.

Japan hosted the Miss International 1984 beauty pageant, won by Guatemalan Ilma Urrutia.

=== Sports ===
At the 1984 Summer Olympics Japan ranked 7th with 10 gold medals. At the Winter Olympics Japan ranked 14th with one silver medal.

In football (soccer), Japan hosted the 1984 Intercontinental Cup. Yomiuri won the Japan Soccer League. For the champions of the regional leagues see: 1984 Japanese Regional Leagues.

== Births ==
=== January ===
- January 1 – Hideki Asai, baseball player
- January 30 – Yushi Aida, baseball player

=== February ===
- February 1 – Risa Wataya, novelist
- February 11 – Mai Demizu, announcer
- February 19 – Masaru Akiba, football player
- February 21 – Karina Nose, model, actress

=== March ===
- March 2 – Jong Tae-se, North Korean, football manager
- March 3 – Akiho Yoshizawa, adult video actress
- March 4 – Ai Iwamura, actress
- March 6 – Becky, singer, model, actress
- March 8 – Eri Yamada, softball player
- March 20 – Yuka Nomura, actress

=== April ===
- April 6 – Takahiro Aoh, boxer
- April 7 – Hiroko Shimabukuro, singer
- April 21 – Taku Akahoshi, football player

=== May ===
- May 1 – Keiichiro Koyama, singer
- May 7 – Miyuki Kanbe, model and actress (died 2008)
- May 17 – Sakurako Terada, curler

=== June ===
- June 4 – Aoi, singer-songwriter
- June 5 – Hiromi Matsunaga, bowling player
- June 7
  - Shu Abe, football player
  - Eri Yanetani, snowboarder
- June 12 – Kyoco, actress
- June 13 – Kaori Icho, wrestler
- June 13 – Ryuji Akiba, football player
- June 16 – Emiri Miyasaka, model
- June 23 – Takeshi Matsuda, swimmer
- June 26 – Emi Tawata, singer
- June 29 – Keiji Obiki, baseball player

=== July ===
- July 4 – Jin Akanishi, actor, singer-songwriter
- July 8 – Nobu Naruse, cross-country skier
- July 16 – Hayanari Shimoda, race car driver
- July 24 – Hajime Ohara, professional wrestler
- July 25
  - Kenji Narisako, hurdler
  - Akie Uegaki, handball player

=== August ===
- August 3 – Erika Araki, volleyball player
- August 5 – Takamasa Anai, judoka
- August 12 – Yua Aida, model and AV idol
- August 19 – Ryota Aoki, football player
- August 21 – Nonaka Emi, ice hockey player
- August 27 – Miyuki Akiyama, volleyball player

=== September ===
- September 8 – Kenta Abe, baseball player
- September 13 – Junichi Sawayashiki, kickboxer
- September 22 – Yukiya Arashiro, road bicycle racer

=== October ===
- October 5 – Yutaro Abe, football player
- October 7 – Toma Ikuta, actor
- October 8 – Jun Ando, football player
- October 9 – Ryunosuke Okamoto, football player
- October 10 – Chiaki Kuriyama, actress, model
- October 13 – Misono, singer-songwriter
- October 22 – Takuya Asao, baseball player
- October 24 – Kaela Kimura, singer, model

=== November ===
- November 3 – Ryo Nishikido, actor, singer
- November 10 – Moe Meguro, curler
- November 21 – Masatomo Kuba, football player
- November 28 – Sayuri Yoshii, speed skater

=== December ===
- December 4 – Takayuki Kishi, professional baseball player
- December 5 – Shuhei Aoyama, motorcycle racer
- December 17 – Asuka Fukuda, J-pop singer
- December 23 – Manabu Soya, professional wrestler

=== Unknown date ===
- T-cophony, musician

== Deaths ==
- February 20 – David Von Erich, American wrestler (b. 1958)
- March 16 – Kayo Yamaguchi, painter (b. 1899)
- April 5 – Keisuke Serizawa, textile designer (b. 1895)
- April 6 – Kazuo Hasegawa, film actor (b. 1908)
- April 9 – Masashi Amenomori, voice actor (b. 1930)
- May 5 – Takayoshi Yoshioka, sprinter (b. 1909)
- May 25 – Jūrō Gotō, Major-General in the Japanese Imperial Army (b. 1887)
- June 15 – Michio Takeyama, writer, literary critic (b. 1903)
- June 23 – Yatarō Kurokawa, actor (b. 1910)
- July 25 – Akihiko Hirata, actor (b. 1927)
- November 13 – Shizo Kanakuri, marathon runner (b. 1891)
- November 21 – Kōsaku Takii, writer (b. 1894)

=== Unknown date ===
- Hiroyuki Tajima, printmaker (b. 1911)

== See also ==
- 1984 in Japanese television
- List of Japanese films of 1984
