= Hitomi (given name) =

- Pronunciation: (HEE-toh-mee)
- Gender: Feminine
- Language: Japanese

Origin
- Origin: Japanese
- Meaning: pupil or eye (瞳), various
- Region of origin: Japan

Hitomi (ヒトミ, ひとみ) is a feminine Japanese given name. It can be written with the single kanji 瞳 (Japanese for pupil or eye) or with various combinations of two kanji with various meanings, such as 仁美 ("benevolent, humane, noble, beauty"). The name can also be written using the hiragana as ひとみ. The singer hitomi writes her stage name using the Latin alphabet.

== People ==
=== Singers ===
- Hitomi Arai (新井 ひとみ; born 1998), Japanese member of Tokyo Girls' Style
- Hitomi Furuya (古谷 仁美; born 1976), Japanese singer-songwriter
- Hitomi Hasegawa (長谷川 稀未; born 2004), Japanese member of Boku ga Mitakatta Aozora
- Hitomi Honda (本田 仁美; born 2001), Japanese singer and member of AKB48 and Iz*One
- Hitomi Isaka (井坂 仁美; born 1992), Japanese member of the group Kamen Rider Girls
- Hitomi Ishikawa (石川 ひとみ; born 1959), Japanese singer and voice actress
- Hitomi Kaji (加治 ひとみ; born 1987), Japanese pop singer, songwriter
- Hitomi Kuroishi (黒石 ひとみ), Japanese singer, author, and composer noted for her involvement with the soundtracks of the anime Last Exile and Code Geass
- Hitomi Mieno (三重野 瞳; born 1977), Japanese singer and screenwriter
- Hitomi Miyake (三宅 ひとみ; born 1992), Japanese former idol and talent
- Hitomi Momoi (桃井 ひとみ; born 1992), J-pop singer, songwriter
- Hitomi Saito (斉藤 瞳; born 1981), Japanese former singer and current radio personality
- Hitomi Shimatani (島谷 ひとみ; born 1980), Japanese pop singer
- Hitomi Suzuki (鈴木 瞳美; born 2001), Japanese member of ≠Me
- Hitomi Takahashi (singer) (高橋 瞳; born 1989), Japanese singer
- Hitomi Takamatsu (髙松 瞳; born 2001), Japanese member of =Love
- Hitomi Tohyama (当山 ひとみ; born 1957), Japanese singer
- Hitomi Yaida (矢井田 瞳; born 1978), Japanese pop/folk rock singer-songwriter, guitarist, and musician
- Hitomi Yoshida (吉田 仁美; born 1984), Japanese singer and actress
- Hitomi Yoshizawa (吉澤 ひとみ; born 1985), Japanese former singer and actress

=== Voice actresses/actresses ===
- Hitomi (ひと美; born 1967), Japanese voice actress from Osaka
- Hitomi Aizawa (相澤 仁美; born 1982), Japanese actress, gravure idol and race queen
- Hitomi Harada (原田 ひとみ; born 1987), Japanese voice actress and singer
- Hitomi Hase (長谷 瞳; born 1979), Japanese voice actress
- Hitomi Katayama (片山 瞳; born 1980), Japanese actress
- Hitomi Kikuchi (菊地 瞳; born 1987), Japanese voice actress
- Hitomi Kobayashi (小林 ひとみ; born 1965), important early Japanese AV idol
- Hitomi Kurihara (栗原 瞳; born 1981), Japanese actress
- Hitomi Kuroki (黒木 瞳; born 1960), Japanese actress and film director
- Hitomi Nabatame (生天目 仁美; born 1976), Japanese actress and singer
- Hitomi Nozoe (野添 ひとみ; 1937–1995), Japanese actress
- Hitomi Ōwada (大和田 仁美), Japanese voice actress
- Hitomi Satō (actress) (佐藤 仁美; born 1979), Japanese actress
- Hitomi Sekine (関根 瞳; born 2000), Japanese voice actress and singer
- Hitomi Shiraishi (白石 ひとみ; born 1971), Japanese AV Idol from the 1990s
- Hitomi Takahashi (actress) (高橋 ひとみ; born 1961), Japanese actress
- Hitomi Ueda (上田 瞳), Japanese voice actress

=== Other ===
- Hitomi Akano (赤野 仁美; born 1974), Japanese retired female mixed martial artist
- Hitomi Hatakeda (畠田 瞳; born 2000), Japanese former artistic gymnast
- Hitomi Honda (baseball) (本田 仁海; born 1999), Japanese professional baseball player
- Hitomi Hosono (born 1978), London-based ceramicist
- Hitomi Jinno (神野 眸; born 1937), Japanese swimmer
- Hitomi Kamanaka (鎌仲 ひとみ; born 1958), Japanese documentary filmmaker
- Hitomi Kanehara (金原 ひとみ; born 1983), Japanese novelist
- Hitomi Kaneko (金子 仁美; born 1965), Japanese classical music composer
- Hitomi Kashima (鹿島 瞳; born 1980), Japanese former butterfly swimmer
- Hitomi Katsuyama (勝山 眸美; born 1994), Japanese hammer thrower
- Hitomi Kawabata (川畑 瞳; born 1996), Japanese softball player
- Hitomi Kitamura (北村 ひとみ; born 1985), Japanese gravure idol and a female talent
- Hitomi Koshimizu (小清水 仁美; born 1960), Japanese luger
- Hitomi Matsushita (松下 仁美; born 1954), Japanese handball player
- Hitomi Mitsunaga (満永 ひとみ; born 1976), Japanese retired female volleyball player
- Hitomi Nakajima (中島 ひとみ; born 1995), Japanese sprint hurdler
- Hitomi Nakamichi (中道 瞳; born 1985), Japanese former volleyball player
- Hitomi Niiya (新谷 仁美; born 1988), Japanese professional long-distance runner
- Hitomi Nishina (仁科 仁美; born 1984), Japanese tarento and model
- Hitomi Noda (野田 仁実; born 1963), spouse of the prime minister of Japan from 2011 to 2012
- Hitomi Obara (小原 日登美; 1981–2025), Japanese sport wrestler
- Hitomi Saito (speed skater) (斎藤 仁美; born 1990), Japanese short track speed skater
- Hitomi Sato (table tennis) (佐藤 瞳; born 1997), Japanese table tennis player
- Hitomi Shimizu (冷水 ひとみ), Japanese musician and composer
- Hitomi Shimura (紫村 仁美; born 1990), Japanese hurdler
- Hitomi Soga (曽我 ひとみ; born 1959), Japanese woman who was abducted to North Korea to train agents in Japanese customs and language
- Hitomi Tada (多田 仁美; born 1991), Japanese handball player
- Hitomi Takagaki (高垣 眸; 1898–1983), Japanese writer
- Hitomi Watanabe (渡辺 眸; born 1939), Japanese photographer
- Hitomi Yamaguchi (山口 瞳; 1923–1995), Japanese novelist and essayist
- Genki Hitomi (人見 元基; born 1957), Japanese former singer and teacher
- Kinue Hitomi (人見 絹枝; 1907–1931), Japanese athlete and the first Japanese woman to receive an Olympic medal
- Takuya Hitomi (人見 拓哉; born 1997), Japanese footballer

== Characters ==
- Hitomi Kagewaki, the young castle lord from InuYasha
- Hitomi Kanzaki, heroine of The Vision of Escaflowne
- Hitomi Kisugi, one of the Cat's Eye trio
- Hitomi, a character from the Dead or Alive series
- Hitomi, a character in the Lego theme Exo-Force
- Hitomi Shinonome, a character in Loveless (manga)
- Hitomi, a major antagonist in Code:Breaker
- Hitomi Shizuki, a minor character in Puella Magi Madoka Magica
- Hitomi Manaka, main protagonist of the manga Nurse Hitomi's Monster Infirmary
- Hitomi, friend of Yuri in Wedding Peach
- Hitomi Tadano, a character in Komi Can't Communicate
- Hitomi Takano, main protagonist of the manga Hitomi-chan is Shy With Strangers
- Hitomi Maejima, a character in the 2004 eroge, Hitomi My Stepsister.

== See also ==
- Hitomi (disambiguation)
- Hitomi Takahashi (disambiguation)
