= Yushi =

Yushi may refer to:

- Mount Yushi, a mountain in Dongyang Township, Guangfeng District, Shangrao, Jiangxi, China
- Yushi, Hunan, a town in Xinhuang Dong Autonomous County, Hunan, China
- Yushi Subdistrict, in Xishi District, Yingkou, Liaoning, China
- Yūshi, a masculine Japanese given name
- Yushi Boys' group NCT wish members
