= 2004 Gamba Osaka season =

Gamba Osaka
2004 season
- Manager: Akira Nishino
- Stadium: Osaka Expo '70 Stadium
- J. League 1: 3rd
- Emperor's Cup: Semi-finals
- J. League Cup: Quarter-finals
- Top goalscorer: Masashi Oguro (20)
| Home colours | Away colours | Third colours |

During the 2004 season, Gamba Osaka competed in the J. League 1, in which they finished 3rd.

== Competitions ==
| Competitions | Position |
|---|---|
| J. League 1 | 3rd / 16 clubs |
| Emperor's Cup | Semifinals |
| J. League Cup | Quarterfinals |

== Domestic results ==
=== J. League 1 ===
==== League table ====
| Pos | Team | Pld | W | D | L | GF | GA | GD | Pts | Qualification |
|---|---|---|---|---|---|---|---|---|---|---|
| 1 | Yokohama F. Marinos (C) | 30 | 17 | 8 | 5 | 47 | 30 | +17 | 59 | Qualification for AFC Champions League 2005 group stage |
| 2 | Urawa Red Diamonds | 30 | 19 | 5 | 6 | 70 | 39 | +31 | 62 | |
| 3 | Gamba Osaka | 30 | 15 | 6 | 9 | 69 | 48 | +21 | 51 | |
| 4 | JEF United Ichihara | 30 | 13 | 11 | 6 | 55 | 45 | +10 | 50 | |
| 5 | Júbilo Iwata | 30 | 14 | 6 | 10 | 54 | 44 | +10 | 48 | Qualification for AFC Champions League 2005 group stage (Note: Júbilo Iwata qualified to 2005 ACL as 2003 Emperor's Cup winners.) |

Updated to match(es) played on November 28, 2004. Source: J. League Division 1 first stage, J. League Division 1 second stage
Rules for classification: 1) points; 2) goal difference; 3) number of goals scored.
(C) Champions

==== Matches ====
| Date | Opponent | Venue | Result F–A |
|---|---|---|---|
| 13 March 2004 | Kashima Antlers | A | 1–1 |
| 20 March 2004 | Sanfrecce Hiroshima | H | 1–0 |
| 3 April 2004 | Shimizu S-Pulse | H | 4–0 |
| 10 April 2004 | Tokyo Verdy | A | 2–2 |
| 14 April 2004 | JEF United Ichihara | H | 2–2 |
| 17 April 2004 | Yokohama F. Marinos | A | 1–2 |
| 2 May 2004 | Nagoya Grampus Eight | H | 0–2 |
| 5 May 2004 | Kashiwa Reysol | A | 2–0 |
| 9 May 2004 | Júbilo Iwata | H | 0–2 |
| 15 May 2004 | Oita Trinita | A | 3–4 |
| 22 May 2004 | Vissel Kobe | H | 6–3 |
| 12 June 2004 | FC Tokyo | A | 1–2 |
| 16 June 2004 | Cerezo Osaka | A | 1–0 |
| 20 June 2004 | Urawa Red Diamonds | H | 3–2 |
| 26 June 2004 | Albirex Niigata | A | 4–1 |
| 14 August 2004 | Nagoya Grampus Eight | A | 2–1 |
| 21 August 2004 | Kashima Antlers | H | 2–1 |
| 29 August 2004 | Shimizu S-Pulse | A | 1–0 |
| 11 September 2004 | Kashiwa Reysol | H | 5–1 |
| 18 September 2004 | Vissel Kobe | A | 3–3 |
| 23 September 2004 | Tokyo Verdy | H | 1–3 |
| 26 September 2004 | Urawa Red Diamonds | A | 1–2 |
| 2 October 2004 | Cerezo Osaka | H | 7–1 |
| 17 October 2004 | Sanfrecce Hiroshima | A | 2–2 |
| 24 October 2004 | Oita Trinita | H | 3–1 |
| 31 October 2004 | JEF United Ichihara | A | 2–2 |
| 6 November 2004 | Albirex Niigata | H | 6–3 |
| 20 November 2004 | Yokohama F. Marinos | H | 0–2 |
| 23 November 2004 | Júbilo Iwata | A | 2–1 |
| 28 November 2004 | FC Tokyo | H | 1–2 |

== Player statistics ==
| No. | Pos. | Player | D.o.B. (Age) | Height / Weight | J. League 1 | | Emperor's Cup | | J. League Cup | | Total | |
| No. | Pos. | Player | D.o.B. (Age) | Height / Weight | Apps | Goals | Apps | Goals | Apps | Goals | Apps | Goals |
|---|---|---|---|---|---|---|---|---|---|---|---|---|
| 1 | GK | Naoki Matsuyo | 9 April 1974 (aged 29) | cm / kg | 29 | 0 | | | | | | |
| 2 | DF | Sidiclei | 13 May 1972 (aged 31) | cm / kg | 30 | 3 | | | | | | |
| 3 | DF | Masao Kiba | 6 September 1974 (aged 29) | cm / kg | 2 | 0 | | | | | | |
| 4 | DF | Noritada Saneyoshi | 19 October 1972 (aged 31) | cm / kg | 22 | 0 | | | | | | |
| 5 | DF | Tsuneyasu Miyamoto | 7 February 1977 (aged 27) | cm / kg | 24 | 0 | | | | | | |
| 6 | DF | Satoshi Yamaguchi | 17 April 1978 (aged 25) | cm / kg | 27 | 5 | | | | | | |
| 7 | MF | Yasuhito Endō | 28 January 1980 (aged 24) | cm / kg | 29 | 9 | | | | | | |
| 8 | MF | Fernandinho | 13 January 1981 (aged 23) | cm / kg | 28 | 10 | | | | | | |
| 9 | FW | Magrão | 21 February 1974 (aged 30) | cm / kg | 10 | 5 | | | | | | |
| 10 | MF | Takahiro Futagawa | 27 June 1980 (aged 23) | cm / kg | 30 | 4 | | | | | | |
| 11 | FW | Masanobu Matsunami | 21 November 1974 (aged 29) | cm / kg | 9 | 0 | | | | | | |
| 13 | MF | Shigeru Morioka | 12 August 1973 (aged 30) | cm / kg | 14 | 2 | | | | | | |
| 14 | DF | Toru Irie | 8 July 1977 (aged 26) | cm / kg | 10 | 0 | | | | | | |
| 15 | MF | Mitsuteru Watanabe | 10 April 1974 (aged 29) | cm / kg | 19 | 0 | | | | | | |
| 16 | FW | Masashi Oguro | 4 May 1980 (aged 23) | cm / kg | 30 | 20 | | | | | | |
| 17 | DF | Arata Kodama | 8 October 1982 (aged 21) | cm / kg | 13 | 0 | | | | | | |
| 18 | FW | Kota Yoshihara | 2 February 1978 (aged 26) | cm / kg | 22 | 5 | | | | | | |
| 19 | FW | Satoshi Nakayama | 7 November 1981 (aged 22) | cm / kg | 22 | 3 | | | | | | |
| 20 | MF | Shinichi Terada | 10 June 1985 (aged 18) | cm / kg | 1 | 0 | | | | | | |
| 21 | FW | Ryota Miki | 12 April 1985 (aged 18) | cm / kg | 0 | 0 | | | | | | |
| 22 | GK | Motohiro Yoshida | 25 August 1974 (aged 29) | cm / kg | 1 | 0 | | | | | | |
| 23 | GK | Suguru Hino | 29 July 1982 (aged 21) | cm / kg | 0 | 0 | | | | | | |
| 24 | MF | Toshihiro Matsushita | 17 October 1983 (aged 20) | cm / kg | 4 | 0 | | | | | | |
| 25 | DF | Daiki Niwa | 16 January 1986 (aged 18) | cm / kg | 0 | 0 | | | | | | |
| 26 | DF | Naoki Kogure | 14 June 1984 (aged 19) | cm / kg | 0 | 0 | | | | | | |
| 27 | MF | Hideo Hashimoto | 21 May 1979 (aged 24) | cm / kg | 27 | 1 | | | | | | |
| 28 | MF | Akihiro Ienaga | 13 June 1986 (aged 17) | cm / kg | 8 | 1 | | | | | | |
| 30 | DF | Ryota Aoki | 19 August 1984 (aged 19) | cm / kg | 0 | 0 | | | | | | |
| 31 | GK | Atsushi Kimura | 1 May 1984 (aged 19) | cm / kg | 0 | 0 | | | | | | |
| 32 | DF | Daisuke Yano | 6 October 1984 (aged 19) | cm / kg | 0 | 0 | | | | | | |
| 33 | MF | Ryunosuke Okamoto | 9 October 1984 (aged 19) | cm / kg | 0 | 0 | | | | | | |

== Other pages ==
- (in Japanese) J. League official site
