= Aoi (name) =

- Pronunciation: [aoi]
- Gender: Unisex

Origin
- Origin: Japan
- Meaning: It can have many different meanings depending on the kanji used.
- Region of origin: Japan

Aoi (あおい, アオイ) is both a Japanese given name and a Japanese surname.

== Written forms ==
Forms in kanji can include:

- 葵, "hollyhock"
- 碧, "blue-green, beautiful"
- 蒼, "blue, indigo"
- 青唯, "blue only"
- 蒼唯, "blue only"
- 葵唯, "hollyhock only"
- 葵陽, "hollyhock sun"

== People ==
with the given name Aoi

- Aoi (born 1984), Japanese singer
- Aoi (葵), vocalist of Japanese rock band Ayabie
- Aoi (葵, born 1979), guitarist of Japanese rock band The Gazette
- Aoi (wrestler) (born 2002), Japanese professional wrestler
- Aoi Anno (安納 蒼衣; born 2007), Japanese member of Boku ga Mitakatta Aozora
- Aoi Enomoto (榎本 葵; born 1992), Japanese baseball player
- Aoi Fujino (藤乃 あおい; 1998–2026), Japanese gravure idol
- Aoi Furutate (古舘 葵; born 2004), Japanese member of NGT48
- Aoi Harada (原田 葵; born 2000), Japanese former member of Sakurazaka46
- Aoi Hiiragi (柊 あおい; born 1962), Japanese manga artist
- Aoi Ichikawa (市川 蒼; born 1991), Japanese voice actor
- Aoi Ito (伊藤 あおい; born 2004), Japanese tennis player
- Aoi Kizaki (木﨑 あおい; born 1998), Japanese professional footballer
- Aoi Kizuki (希月 あおい; born 1989), Japanese retired professional wrestler
- Aoi Koga (古賀 葵; born 1993), Japanese voice actress
- Aoi Kudo (工藤 蒼生; born 2000), Japanese footballer
- Aoi Masuda (増田 葵; born 1996), Japanese swimmer
- Aoi Matsuda (松田 蒼; born 1996), Japanese badminton player
- Aoi Mimura (三村 亜生; born 1989), Japanese rugby union player
- Aoi Miyazaki (宮﨑 あおい; born 1985), Japanese actress
- Aoi Morikawa (森川 葵; born 1995), Japanese actress and model
- Aoi Nakabeppu (中別府 葵; born 1990), Japanese fashion model and actress
- Aoi Nakamura (中村 蒼; born 1991), Japanese actor
- Aoi Nanase (七瀬 葵; born 1967), Japanese manga artist
- Aoi Nishimata (西又 葵; born 1977), Japanese character designer and illustrator
- Aoi Onishi (大西 葵; born 1994), Japanese member of ≒Joy
- Aoi Shiga (志賀 葵; born 1999), Japanese ice hockey player
- Aoi Tada (多田 葵; born 1981), Japanese voice actress
- Aoi Teshima (手嶌 葵; born 1987), Japanese singer and voice actress
- Aoi Yamada (山田 葵; born 2000), Japanese dancer, model and actress
- Aoi Yūki (八武崎 碧; born 1992), Japanese voice actress

with the surname Aoi

- Eir Aoi (藍井 エイル; born 1988), Japanese singer
- Futaba Aoi (葵 二葉), Japanese manga artist
- Nonoa Aoi (蒼井 乃々愛; born 2002), Japanese member of Kamen Joshi
- Ruri Aoi (葵 るり; born 2004), Japanese member of ukka
- Shouta Aoi (蒼井 翔太; born 1987), Japanese singer and voice actor
- Sola Aoi (蒼井 そら; born 1983), Japanese AV idol
- Tsukasa Aoi (葵 つかさ; born 1990), Japanese AV idol
- Wakana Aoi (葵 わかな; born 1998), Japanese actress and idol
- Yū Aoi (蒼井 優; born 1985), Japanese actress and model

== Fictional characters ==
with the given name Aoi

- Aoi (アオイ), Laughing Man's alias, a character in the anime series Ghost in the Shell: Stand Alone Complex
- Aoi (あおい), a character in the anime Witchblade
- Aoi "Hina" Asahina (朝日奈 葵), a character in the video game series Danganronpa and its anime adaptations
- Aoi Futaba (葵 双葉), a character in the manga series You're Under Arrest
- Aoi Futaba (二葉 あおい), a character in the anime series Vividred Operation
- Aoi Housen (蓬仙 あおい), a character in the anime series Infinite Ryvius
- Aoi Kanzaki (神崎 アオイ), a character in the manga and anime series Demon Slayer: Kimetsu no Yaiba
- Aoi Kimidori (木緑 葵), a character in the manga series Dr. Slump
- Aoi Kunieda (邦枝 葵), a character in the manga series Beelzebub
- Aoi Miyamori (宮森 あおい), a character in the anime series Shirobako
- Aoi Matsubara (松原 葵), a character in the visual novel To Heart
- Aoi Ogiyama (荻山 葵), a character in the light novel Ro-Kyu-Bu!
- Aoi Sakamoto (坂本 葵), a character in the manga series Sakamoto Days
- Aoi Sakuraba (桜庭 葵), a character in the manga series Ai Yori Aoshi
- Aoi Ryugoku (茜 鳥保), a character in the video game Yandere Simulator
- Aoi Tōsaka (遠坂 葵), a character in the light novel series Fate/Zero
- Aoi no Ue (葵の上), a wife of Hikaru Genji in the classic The Tale of Genji
- Aoi Umenokoji (梅小路 葵), a character in the video game series Virtua Fighter
- Aoi Todo (東堂 葵), a character in the manga and anime series Jujutsu Kaisen
- Aoi Hyoudou (兵藤 葵), a character in the manga and anime series Maid-Sama!

with the surname Aoi

- Akira Aoi (蒼井 晶), a character in the anime series selector infected WIXOSS
- Ashito Aoi (青井 葦人), the title character in the manga series Aoashi
- Daichi Aoi (葵 大地) (Clay Terran), a character in the video game Phoenix Wright: Ace Attorney - Dual Destinies
- Erika Aoi (蒼井 えりか), a character in the game series Heaven Burns Red
- Nagisa Aoi (蒼井 渚砂), protagonist of the light novel series Strawberry Panic!
- Shingo Aoi (葵 新伍), a character in the multimedia franchise Captain Tsubasa
- Valt Aoi (蒼井 バルト, Aoi Baruto), the main character of the anime/manga Beyblade Burst and Beyblade Burst God/Evolution and supporting character in the rest of the seasons
