= Hitomi =

Hitomi may refer to:.

== People ==
- Hitomi (given name), a feminine Japanese given name
- Hitomi (voice actress) (born 1967), Japanese voice actress
- Hitomi (singer) (born 1976, as Hitomi Furuya), Japanese singer and songwriter
- Hitomi Nabatame (born 1976), Japanese voice actress
- Hitomi Yaida (born 1978), also known as Yaiko, Japanese pop/folk singer
- Hitomi Aizawa (born 1982), Japanese actress, gravure idol and race queen
- Hitomi Honda (born 2001), Japanese singer from Iz*One and AKB48

== Fictional characters ==
- Hitomi (Dead or Alive), a fictional video game character
- Hitomi, a fictional character in the Appleseed animated film
- Hitomi Shizuki, a minor character in the anime/manga series Puella Magi Madoka Magica
- Hitomi Sagan, a character from AI: The Somnium Files

== Other uses ==
- Hitomi (album) (2000), by John Fahey
- Hitomi (satellite) (2016), a short-lived X-ray space telescope
