= Ryota Aoki =

Ryota Aoki may refer to:

- Ryota Aoki (footballer, born 1984) (青木 良太), Japanese footballer
- Ryota Aoki (footballer, born 1996) (青木 亮太), Japanese footballer
