= Ryota Aoki (footballer, born 1984) =

Japanese footballer

Ryota Aoki 青木 良太
Personal information
- Full name: Ryota Aoki
- Date of birth: 19 August 1984 (age 42)
- Place of birth: Takatsuki, Osaka, Japan
- Height: 1.82 m (6 ft 0 in)
- Position: Defender

Youth career
- 2000–2002: Funabashi High School

Senior career*
Years	Team	Apps	(Gls)
2003–2007	Gamba Osaka	13	(0)
2008–2013	JEF United Chiba	109	(3)
2013	Roasso Kumamoto	9	(0)
2014–2016	Thespakusatsu Gunma	63	(0)
Total		194	(3)

International career
2001	Japan U-17	3	(0)
- * Club domestic league appearances and goals

Ryota Aoki (青木 良太, Aoki Ryōta; born 19 August 1984) is a Japanese former professional footballer who played as a defender.

== Club career ==
Aoki was born in Takatsuki on 19 August 1984. After graduating from high school, he joined his local club Gamba Osaka in 2003. However he could hardly play in the match. He moved to JEF United Chiba in 2008. Although he became a regular player, the club was relegated to J2 League end of 2009 season. His opportunity to play decreased from 2012 and he moved to Roasso Kumamoto in August 2013. He moved to Thespakusatsu Gunma in 2014. His opportunity to play decreased in 2016 and retired end of 2016 season.

== National team career ==
In September 2001, Aoki was selected Japan U-17 national team for 2001 U-17 World Championship. He played full-time in all 3 matches.

== Club statistics ==
Club performance			League		Cup		League Cup		Continental		Total	
Season	Club	League	Apps	Goals	Apps	Goals	Apps	Goals	Apps	Goals	Apps	Goals
Japan			League		Emperor's Cup		J.League Cup		AFC		Total	
2003	Gamba Osaka	J1 League	0	0	0	0	1	0	-		1	0
2004	Gamba Osaka	J1 League	0	0	2	0	1	0	-		3	0
2005	Gamba Osaka	J1 League	3	0	0	0	3	0	-		6	0
2006	Gamba Osaka	J1 League	6	0	0	0	2	0	2	0	10	0
2007	Gamba Osaka	J1 League	4	0	1	0	5	0	-		10	0
2008	JEF United Chiba	J1 League	29	1	1	0	6	0	-		36	1
2009	JEF United Chiba	J1 League	26	0	1	0	3	0	-		30	0
2010	JEF United Chiba	J2 League	23	2	3	0	-		-		26	2
2011	JEF United Chiba	J2 League	28	0	1	0	-		-		29	0
2012	JEF United Chiba	J2 League	2	0	2	0	-		-		4	0
2013	JEF United Chiba	J2 League	1	0	0	0	-		-		1	0
2013	Roasso Kumamoto	J2 League	9	0	1	0	-		-		10	0
2014	Thespakusatsu Gunma	J2 League	21	0	1	0	-		-		22	0
2015	Thespakusatsu Gunma	J2 League	37	0	0	0	-		-		37	0
Total			189	3	13	0	21	0	2	0	225	3
