= Yūshi =

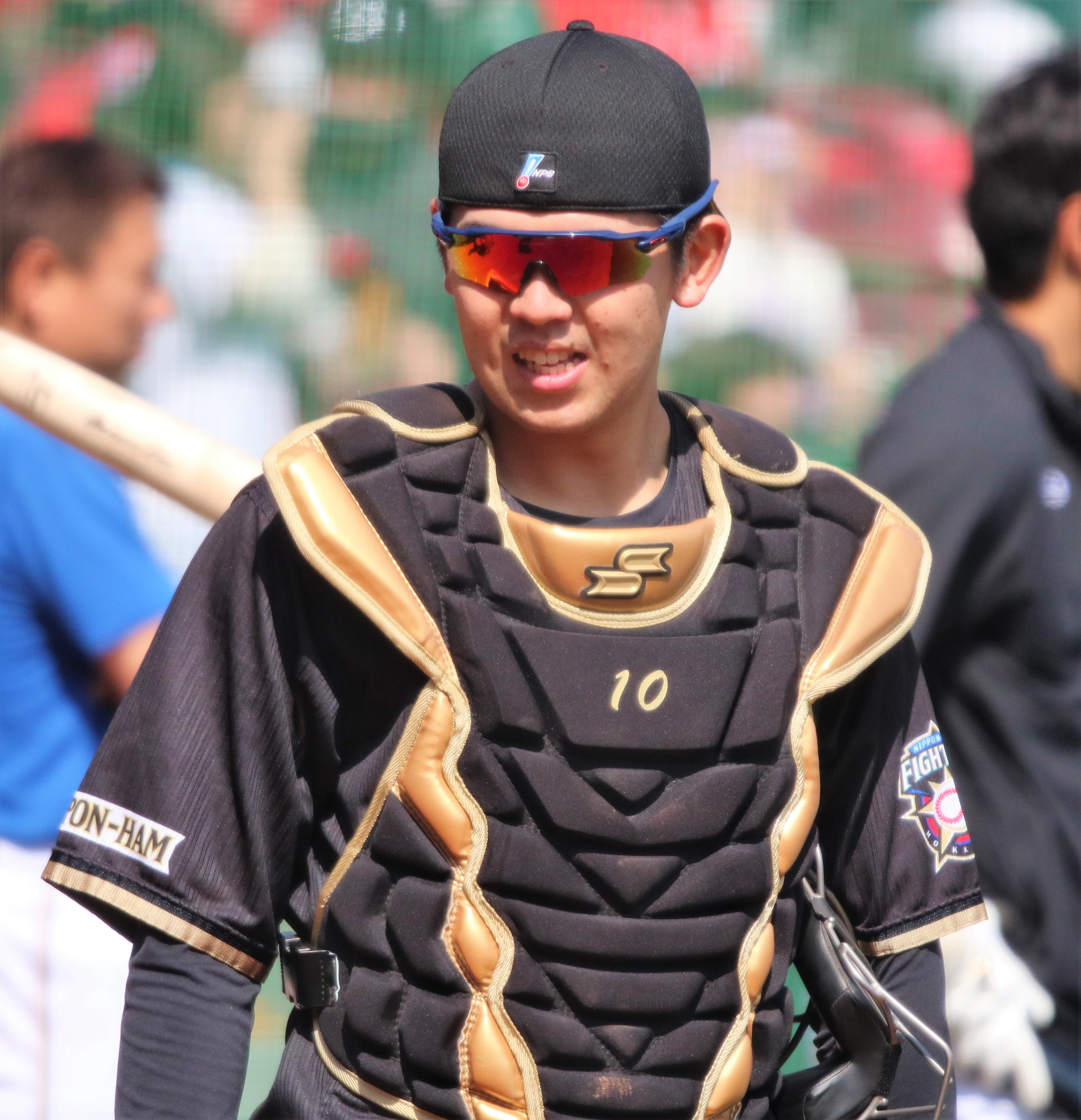
- Yushi Shimizu, Japanese baseball player
- Pronunciation: jɯɯɕi (IPA)
- Gender: Male

Origin
- Origin: Japanese
- Meaning: Different meanings depending on the kanji used

Other names
- Alternative spelling: Yusi (Kunrei-shiki) Yusi (Nihon-shiki) Yūshi, Yushi, Yuushi (Hepburn)

Yūshi, Yushi or Yuushi is a masculine Japanese given name.

== Written forms ==
Yūshi can be written using different combinations of kanji characters. Some examples:

- 勇志, "courage, determination"
- 勇史, "courage, history"
- 勇士, "courage, knight"
- 雄志, "masculine, determination"
- 雄史, "masculine, history"
- 雄士, "masculine, knight"
- 優志, "superiority, determination"
- 優史, "superiority, history"
- 優士, "superiority, knight"
- 祐志, "to help, determination"
- 祐史, "to help, history"
- 友志, "friend, determination"
- 友史, "friend, history"
- 有志, "to have, determination"
- 有史, "to have, history"
- 悠志, "long time, determination"
- 悠史, "long time, history"
- 侑士, "to urge, knight"

The name can also be written in hiragana ゆうし or katakana ユウシ.

== Notable people with the name ==
- Yushi Aida (会田 有志; born 1984), Japanese baseball player
- Yushi Hasegawa (長谷川 雄志; born 1996), Japanese footballer
- Yushi Kobayashi (小林 祐史; 1898–1988), Japanese photographer
- Yushi Mizobuchi (溝渕 雄志; born 1994), Japanese former football player
- Yushi Nagashima (永島 悠史; born 1996), Japanese former football player
- Yushi Ozaki (尾崎 勇史; born 1969), Japanese footballer
- Yushi Shimamura (島村 優志; born 1999), Japanese footballer
- Yushi Shimizu (清水 優心; born 1996), Japanese baseball player
- Yushi Soda (曽田 雄志; born 1978), Japanese footballer
- Yushi Tanaka (田中 湧士; born 1999), Japanese badminton player
- Yushi Uchimura (内村 祐之; 1897–1980), Japanese medical scientist and psychiatrist
- Yushi Yamaya (山谷 侑士; born 2000), Japanese footballer
