= 1984 in Japanese television =

Events in 1984 in Japanese television.

== Debuts ==
- Uchuu Keiji Shaider, tokusatsu (1984–1985)
- Adventures of the Little Koala, anime (1984–1985)
- Attacker You!, anime (1984–1985)
- Bismark, anime (1984–1985)
- Chikkun Takkun, anime (1984)
- Sherlock Hound, anime (1984-1985)
- Giant Gorg, anime (1984)
- Fist of the North Star, anime (1984-1987)
- Choudenshi Bioman, tokusatsu (1984–1985)
- Mujaki na Kankei, drama (1984)
- Super Dimension Cavalry Southern Cross, anime (1984)

== Ongoing ==
- Music Fair, music (1964–present)
- Mito Kōmon, jidaigeki (1969-2011)
- Sazae-san, anime (1969–present)
- Cat’s Eye, anime (1983-1985)
- Ōoka Echizen, jidaigeki (1970-1999)
- FNS Music Festival, music (1974–present)
- Panel Quiz Attack 25, game show (1975–present)
- Doraemon, anime (1979-2005)
- Dr. Slump - Arale-chan, anime (1981-1986)
- Urusei Yatsura, anime (1981-1986)

== Endings ==
Show	Station	Ending Date	Genre	Original Run
Igano Kabamaru	Nippon TV	March 29th	anime	October 20, 1983 – March 29, 1984
Kagaku Sentai Dynaman	TV Asahi	January 28th	tokusatsu	February 5, 1983 – January 28, 1984
Miyuki	FNS	April 20	anime	March 31, 1983 – April 20, 1984
Ōedo Sōsamō	TV Tokyo	September 29	jidaigeki	October 3, 1970 - September 29, 1984
Uchuu Keiji Sharivan	TV Asahi	February 24	tokusatsu	March 4, 1983 – February 24, 1984

== See also ==
- 1984 in anime
- List of Japanese television dramas
- 1984 in Japan
- List of Japanese films of 1984
