= List of Japanese films of 1984 =

A list of films released in Japan in 1984 (see 1984 in film).

Title	Director	Cast	Genre	Notes
1984
Abnormal Family: Older Brother's Bride	Masayuki Suo	Ren Osugi; Shirō Shimomoto	Pink film	
Bioman Movie			Sci-fi for children	
Farewell to the Ark	Shūji Terayama			Entered into the 1985 Cannes Film Festival
The Funeral	Juzo Itami	Tsutomu Yamazaki; Nobuko Miyamoto	Drama	Japan Academy Prize for Best Film
Kinnikuman the Movie: Great Riot! Justice Superman			Anime for Children	
Kinnikuman the Movie: Stolen Championship Belt			Anime for Children	
Kōichirō Uno's Wet and Swinging	Shūsuke Kaneko	Natsuko Yamamoto; Arisa Hayashi	Roman porno	Kaneko's directorial debut, winner of Best New Director, Yokohama Film Festival
MacArthur's Children	Masahiro Shinoda	Ken Watanabe; Masako Natsume	Drama	
Marriage Counselor Tora-san	Yoji Yamada	Kiyoshi Atsumi	Comedy	33rd in the Otoko wa Tsurai yo series
Mermaid Legend	Toshiharu Ikeda	Mari Shirato; Junko Miyashita		
The Miracle of Joe Petrel	Toshiya Fujita	Saburō Tokitō		
Nausicaä of the Valley of the Wind	Hayao Miyazaki		Anime	
The Return of Godzilla			Kaiju	First Heisei era Godzilla film.
The Super Dimension Fortress Macross: Do You Remember Love?			Anime	
Tora-san's Forbidden Love	Yoji Yamada	Kiyoshi Atsumi	Comedy	34th in the Otoko wa Tsurai yo series, entered into Moscow
Tragedy of W	Shinichiro Sawai	Yakushimaru Hiroko	Suspense	
Ultraman Story	Kōichi Takano	Tarō Ishida	Kaiju	
Ultraman Zoffy: Ultra Warriors vs. the Giant Monster Army	Kōichi Takano	Hikaru Urano	Kaiju	
Urusei Yatsura: Beautiful Dreamer	Mamoru Oshii	Fumi Hirano; Toshio Furukawa	Anime; Romantic comedy Science fiction	
Windy Story	Masato Harada	Hiroyuki Watanabe, Dean Reed, Patrick Stewart, Leslie Malton	Drama, Sport	Japanese-West German co-production

== See also ==
- 1984 in Japan
- 1984 in Japanese television
