= Ryota Miki =

Japanese footballer

Ryota Miki 三木 良太
Personal information
- Date of birth: April 12, 1985 (age 41)
- Place of birth: Ibaraki, Osaka, Japan
- Height: 1.83 m (6 ft 0 in)
- Position: Forward

Youth career
- 2001–2003: Gamba Osaka

Senior career*
Years	Team	Apps	(Gls)
2004–2009	Gamba Osaka	3	(0)
2007–2008	→ Ehime FC (loan)	41	(4)
2009–2011	Fagiano Okayama	31	(5)
Total		75	(9)
Medal record
Gamba Osaka
Winner	J1 League	2005
Runner-up	J.League Cup	2005
Winner	Emperor's Cup	2009
Runner-up	Emperor's Cup	2006
- * Club domestic league appearances and goals

Ryota Miki (三木 良太, Miki Ryōta; born April 12, 1985) is a former Japanese football player.

== Career statistics ==
Appearances and goals by club, season and competition
Club	Season	League			Emperor's Cup		J.League Cup		Asia		Total	
Club	Season	Division	Apps	Goals	Apps	Goals	Apps	Goals	Apps	Goals	Apps	Goals
Gamba Osaka	2004	J1 League	0	0	0	0	0	0	—		0	0
Gamba Osaka	2005	J1 League	3	0	3	1	0	0	—		6	1
Gamba Osaka	2006	J1 League	0	0	0	0	0	0	1	0	1	0
Ehime FC	2007	J2 League	25	2	3	1	—		—		28	3
Ehime FC	2008	J2 League	16	2	0	0	—		—		16	2
Gamba Osaka	2009	J1 League	0	0	0	0	0	0	0	0	0	0
Fagiano Okayama	2009	J2 League	15	2	1	0	—		—		16	2
Fagiano Okayama	2010	J2 League										
Career total			59	6	7	2	0	0	1	0	67	8
