= T-cophony =

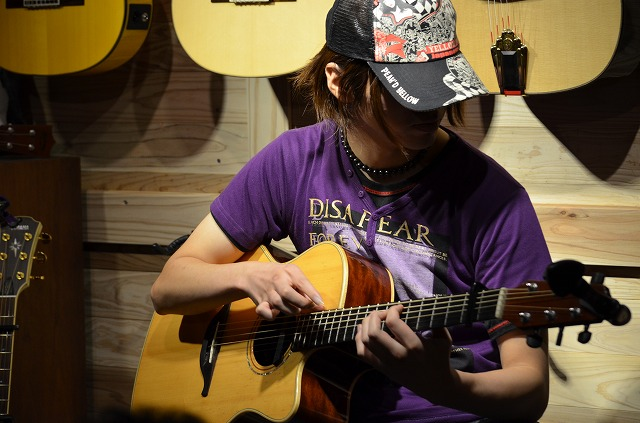
- T-cophony at Guitarshop TANTAN, Japan, 2013

Background information
- Also known as: T Tcop
- Genres: Instrumental rock, hard rock, folk, electronic music
- Occupation(s): Musician, songwriter
- Instrument(s): Guitar, bass, keyboards, drum
- Years active: 2005–present
- Labels: Asaki music, T'ral cooperation
- Website: t-cophony.com

T-cophony (born 1984) is a Japanese songwriter, multi-instrumentalist, instrumental rock guitarist, known primarily for his work as a fingerstyle guitarist. He established his own and new style of acoustic guitar music, by which he combined music with the sound of the acoustic guitar as the main theme with advanced techniques such as a tapping with a magnificent sound of string instrument, electric sound such as a techno music, hard rock with accompaniment with an electric guitar and drum sound and so on. His music talent is quite extensive, and he does not only perform a fingerstyle acoustic or hard rock but also shows, as it is called, ambient and electronica musical works, in which he doesn't include the guitar sound at all. Also, he uses his alternate artist name for this. Also, he does several works of music all by himself, for example, even directing the music videos, editing and has released most of them to the public through his web site for the purpose of promotion of his own music. Because his works are quite high level, the number of people who believe that he asks a professional creator to do this kind of work are certainly more than a few. He has a unique method of expression and a talented musical sense which is quite varied. This has been attracting people all over the world through the Internet.

== Biography ==
Since he was quite young his parents led him to listen various kinds of music, such as hard rock, heavy metal, classic, electric music and traditional music etc. In addition to this, they took him to many music concerts. When he was six, he started going to drum lessons near their house and kept having the lessons for about six years. However, one day the class had moved to somewhere else, so he ended up quitting. He was engaged in drawing pictures after for a while when he was 14 years old, and one day he found a little electric guitar which was given as a present by his dad a long time ago behind a chest and he then started playing it. At that time, his parents led him to listen to pops and hard rock music from the 60s to 80s. On the other hand, he preferred to listen to alternative rock and electronica / ambient and tried to play those songs everyday by copying them simply by watching them. His guitar technique was almost completed by the time he entered high school. The audio sources which he created at that time are available to listen to on his public website or his first independent album. He talked about why he started focusing on acoustic guitar ? which he now plays – at that time. The reason was because the electric guitar's circuit always broke down and he got sick of fixing it. As a result, he found something new about the possibility of the way of expression with the acoustic guitar which was different from the electric guitar, and he really started songwriting focusing on this.

He revealed that he was suffering from a mental illness on his website, because of the violence he received several times from his dad when he was a child. So he announced "A person in the water", in which he expressed the side effects of the sleeping pills and tranquilizer medication by using the music and movies. However, he says that his relationship with his dad has been good lately.

Since 2005, he made another artists name by putting his real name's initials and an English word which means'cacophony' together and converted it to a coined word. So then he started releasing many of his musical compositions which he'd saved up by that time on the Internet. In 2006, he released his independent albums, which are 'Experimental Album' and 'Stubborn Ears Forbidden', and 'How to get much more' the following year. In 2008, he debuted by releasing his album 'Sharing the emotion', which was released for the first time in Japan.

He told about the reason why he liked focusing on releasing his music works as below. "I've been controlling my mental illness well by listening to my own music for reminding myself of various memories. I can transform the present to some different time and place from where I am now. When I listen to my music, I can be in a different place. Because all the musical works were written only for me, I didn't mean to release them to the public. But I realized that if I released the albums, my music would remain in the world forever and I can share my emotion with a lot of people in the world. Now I feel it is quite stimulating. I found that benefit isn't always about money. "

In 2011, he did music session with the first drummer of Saosin "Pat Magrath" on the internet. And there is the video on their channel of YouTube. On 21 November, he appeared on the Japanese famous TV show "行列のできる法律相談所". Due to overwhelming viewer response to the program, his albums "2009-2002" and "Unknown coloration Original" were ranked the first and second of the general music ranking of Amazon Japan.

== Discography ==
=== Albums ===
- 2006: Experimental Album, asaki music
- 2006: Stubborn Ears Forbidden, asaki music
- 2007: How to get much more, asaki music
- 2007: No concept
- 2008: Sharing the emotion, RisM Music
- 2009: Unknown coloration, RisM Music
- 2009: Unknown coloration
- 2010: Transported
- 2010: 2009–2002, T'ral cooperation
- 2011: Unknown coloration Original, T'ral cooperation
- 2012: Load before departure, T'ral cooperation
- 2012: Sharing the emotion Original, T'ral cooperation
- 2013: Pressed for time, T'ral cooperation
