= Hitomi Takahashi =

Hitomi Takahashi may refer to:

- Hitomi Takahashi (actress) (高橋 ひとみ, born 1961), Japanese actress
- Hitomi Takahashi (singer) (高橋 瞳, born 1989), Japanese singer
