= Hitomi-chan Is Shy With Strangers =

Japanese manga series

- First tankōbon volume cover, featuring Yuu Usami (left) and Hitomi Takano (right)

瞳ちゃんは人見知り (Hitomi-chan wa Hito Mishiri)
- Genre: Romantic comedy; Slice of life
- Manga
- Written by: Chorisuke Natsumi
- Published by: Akita Shoten
- English publisher: NA: Seven Seas Entertainment
- Imprint: Champion Red Comics
- Magazine: Manga Cross
- Original run: September 20, 2018 – May 1, 2025
- Volumes: 12
- icon

Hitomi-chan Is Shy With Strangers (Japanese: 瞳ちゃんは人見知り, Hepburn: Hitomi-chan wa Hito Mishiri) is a Japanese manga series written and illustrated by Chorisuke Natsumi. It was serialized on Akita Shoten's online platform Manga Cross from September 2018 to May 2025.

== Premise ==
One day while on his way to school, Yuu Usami meets a new transfer student named Hitomi Takano, who has an intimidating appearance. However, he later discovers she is actually shy. Yuu befriends Hitomi and over time, they start to develop feelings for each other.

== Characters ==
Hitomi Takano (鷹野 瞳, Takano Hitomi)
Hitomi is a first-year high school student who has a scary appearance, but is actually shy and wants to be more social. She befriends Yuu on their way to school after Yuu realizes Hitomi is far more gentle and friendly than her intimidating presence suggests.
Yuu Usami (宇佐見 優, Usami Yū)
Yuu is a second-year high school student who befriends Hitomi. He is nicknamed "Usa-kun" (ウサ君) for short. While not nearly as athletic as Hitomi or Kaoru, he is a good student and tutors Hitomi in math.
Kaoru Usami (宇佐見 カオル, Usami Kaoru)
Kaoru is Yuu's younger sister, and Hitomi's classmate. She is much more athletic than Yuu and naturally outgoing. She admires that Hitomi has large breasts and toned abs.^{Ch. 3}

== Publication ==
Written and illustrated by Chorisuke Natsumi, Hitomi-chan Is Shy With Strangers was serialized on Akita Shoten's online platform Manga Cross from September 20, 2018, to May 1, 2025. Akita Shoten collected its chapters in twelve tankōbon volumes, released from May 20, 2019, to July 18, 2025.

In May 2021, Seven Seas Entertainment announced that they had licensed the series for English release in North America in both physical and digital format. The first volume was released on October 5, 2021.

=== Volumes ===
No.	Original release date	Original ISBN	English release date	English ISBN
1	May 20, 2019	978-4-253-23951-6	October 5, 2021	978-1-64827-663-7
Chapters 1–12; Omake (おまけ)
2	November 20, 2019	978-4-253-23952-3	December 7, 2021	978-1-64827-664-4
Chapters 13–24; Omake (おまけ)
3	May 20, 2020	978-4-253-23953-0	February 22, 2022	978-1-64827-665-1
Chapters 25–36; Omake (おまけ)
4	January 20, 2021	978-4-253-23954-7	May 31, 2022	978-1-63858-254-0
Chapters 37–48; Omake (おまけ)
5	August 19, 2021	978-4-253-23955-4	September 27, 2022	978-1-63858-658-6
Chapters 49–60; Omake (おまけ)
6	February 18, 2022	978-4-253-23967-7	September 19, 2023	978-1-63858-966-2
Chapters 61–72; Omake (おまけ)
7	August 19, 2022	978-4-253-32101-3	December 12, 2023	978-1-68579-674-7
Chapters 73–84; Omake (おまけ)
8	February 20, 2023	978-4-253-32102-0	May 7, 2024	979-8-88843-353-9
Chapters 85–96; Omake (おまけ)
9	September 20, 2023	978-4-253-32103-7	October 8, 2024	979-8-89160-182-6
Chapters 97–108; Omake (おまけ)
10	May 20, 2024	978-4-253-32104-4	March 4, 2025	979-8-89373-142-2
Chapters 109–120; Omake (おまけ)
11	December 19, 2024	978-4-253-32105-1	August 26, 2025	979-8-89561-276-7
Chapters 121–132; Omake (おまけ)
12	July 18, 2025	978-4-253-32106-8	April 14, 2026	979-8-89561-677-2
Chapters 133–144; Omake (おまけ)

== Reception ==
Caitlin Moore of Anime News Network described the first volume as a "mediocre iteration of the [romantic comedy] genre", and noted stylistic similarities to Azumanga Daioh in its artwork and humor, though she found the characters less engaging. She criticized the repetitive jokes and excessive fanservice, arguing that the series would likely only resonate with either newcomers to the genre or devoted fans seeking similar works, leaving little appeal for general audiences.
