= Hitomi Koshimizu =

Japanese luger (born 1960)

Personal information
- Nationality: Japanese
- Born: 24 May 1960 (age 64); Hokkaido, Japan

Sport
- Sport: Luge

Hitomi Koshimizu (born 24 May 1960) is a Japanese luger. She competed at the 1984 Winter Olympics and the 1988 Winter Olympics.
