= Market-oriented sector selective talks (US–Japan) =

The market-oriented sector selective talks (MOSS) were a series of negotiations held in 1984 between the United States and Japan. The purpose of these talks was to address trade frictions and resolve issues related to four specific product areas: forest products, telecommunications equipment and services, electronics, and pharmaceuticals and medical equipment. The primary focus of the talks was to identify and eliminate both overt and informal barriers to imports, with a particular emphasis on addressing the barriers present on the Japanese side.

The MOSS negotiations spanned the course of 1985 and aimed to promote a more open and fair trading environment between the two nations. By tackling trade barriers head-on, the talks sought to create opportunities for increased market access and ensure a level playing field for both American and Japanese businesses operating in these sectors.

The forest products sector was one of the key areas addressed in the MOSS talks. Both countries recognized the importance of this sector in their economies and aimed to establish mechanisms that would facilitate greater trade in forest products between them. By addressing tariff and non-tariff barriers, such as import quotas and technical regulations, the negotiators aimed to enhance bilateral trade in this industry.

Telecommunications equipment and services were also a significant focus of the MOSS negotiations. Both countries sought to identify and address barriers that hindered the import and export of telecommunications equipment and services. This included addressing issues related to market access, standards, and regulations that may have been impeding the growth of this sector.

The talks further encompassed the electronics industry, which was experiencing rapid advancements and growing global demand during that time. The negotiators aimed to tackle barriers that restricted the import of electronics products and components, aiming to promote fair competition and greater market access for both American and Japanese electronics businesses.

The pharmaceuticals and medical equipment sector, another key area of discussion, aimed to foster greater collaboration and trade between the two countries. By addressing regulatory barriers and other impediments, the negotiators aimed to facilitate the exchange of pharmaceutical products and medical equipment, ensuring that safe and effective products could reach the market more efficiently.

Throughout the negotiations, both the United States and Japan worked towards achieving a mutually beneficial outcome. While the success of the talks was modest, they laid the groundwork for continued discussions and efforts to improve trade relations between the two countries. The MOSS negotiations provided a platform for open dialogue, allowing both nations to address specific trade frictions and work towards resolving them.

== See also ==
- Japan–United States relations
- Economic relations of Japan
- General Agreement on Tariffs and Trade
