= Hitomi Kitamura =

Japanese gravure idol

- Born: July 16, 1985 (age 40); Saitama prefecture, Japan
- Other name: Tama Mizuki
- Occupations: gravure idol; actress; singer
- Years active: 2005–present
- Modeling information
- Height: 1.52 m (5 ft 0 in)
- Hair color: Black
- Eye color: Dark Brown

Hitomi Kitamura (北村ひとみ, Kitamura Hitomi; born July 16, 1985) is a Japanese gravure idol and a female talent. She is from Saitama. She changed her stage name to Tama Mizuki (水樹たま, Mizuki Tama) on September 1, 2010.

== Bibliography ==
=== Photographs ===
- Yureru Omoi (ゆれる想い), 2005 ISBN 978-4-812-42403-2
- Melon Chan!, 2006 ISBN 978-4-860-46102-7

=== Magazines ===
- Asa-gei Secret Vol.18, 2010 EAN 491-0-20-018112-5

== Filmography ==
=== Movies ===
- [Kekko Kamen] Royale, 2007
- [Kekko Kamen] Premium, 2007
- [Kekko Kamen] Forever, 2007
- Trick House, 2008

=== Image videos released as Hitomi Kitamura ===
- Yureru Omoi (ゆれる想い), 2005 ISBN 978-4-8124-2383-7
- Melon Chan!, 2006 ISBN 978-4-86046-276-5
- Marshmallow (マシュマロ), 2006 ISBN 978-4-8211-3168-6
- Hatachi no Hitomi (二十歳の瞳), 2006 ISBN 978-4-86084-514-8
- Nittelegenic 2006 Mune Ippai no Ai wo (日テレジェニック2006 胸いっぱいの愛を), 2006
- Nittelegenic 2006 Mémoires <Memoir> (日テレジェニック2006 Mémoires＜メモアール＞), 2007
- Yawaraka na Hitomi (やわらかなひとみ), 2007 ISBN 978-4-86232-096-4
- Tsubura na Hitomi (つぶらなひとみ), 2007 ISBN 978-4-86084-624-4
- SWEETIE, 2007
- HIT me!, 2007
- Purin a la Mode (ぷりんアラモード), 2008
- Tappuri Purin a la Mode (たっぷりぷりんアラモード), 2008
- Avangals!, 2008
- Collage, 2008 With Ryoko Mitsui
- Kagayaku Hi. To. Mi. (輝くひ・と・み), 2008
- Hazumu Hitomi (弾むひとみ), 2009
- Itoshi no Hitomi (愛しのひとみ), 2009
- Meromeron (メロメロ～ン), 2009
- Torokeru Kajitsu (とろける果実), 2009
- Ponyo Ponyo Wonderland (ポニョポニョわんだーらんど), 2010
- Ponyo Ponyo Wonderland 2 (ポニョポニョわんだーらんど2), 2010

=== Image videos released as Tama Mizuki ===
- SWINUTION, 2010
- Puru Puru Purun (ぷるぷるぷるん), 2010
- TUYA-TAMA (艶珠 TUYA-TAMA), 2011
- Peach Bomb, 2011
- Mizuki no Kimochi (水樹のキモチ), 2011
- Yureru Suicup (ゆれるすいかっぷ), 2012
- Mizutama (みずたま), 2012
- Tamapelo! (たまペロッ!), 2012

=== DVD box sets ===
- 4 Pieces BOX, 2009

== Discography ==
=== Singles ===
1. Hito -> P Trance – Yurechau Hitomi~ (ひとP→トランス～ゆれちゃうひとみ～), 2007
2. Hitomi ni Dokkin Yasashiku Mitsumete~ (ひとみにドッキン☆～やさしく見つめて～), 2007

=== Albums ===
1. GIRLS' PARTY SUPER BEST, 2007
2. Romance no Kami-sama ~Be Myself~ (ロマンスの神様~Be myself~), 2008

== Miscellaneous ==
- Air Idol, 2007
