= Mount Yushi =

Mountain in Jiangxi province, China

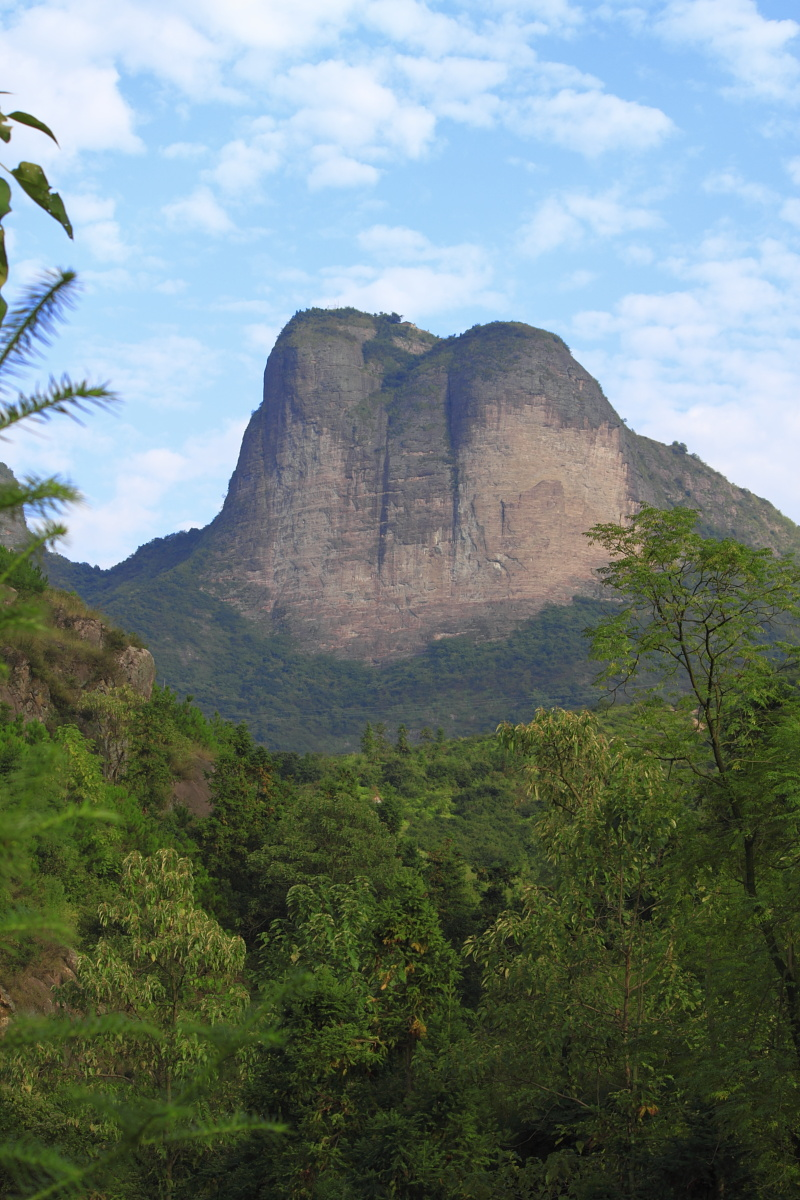
- Mount Yushi

Highest point
- Elevation: 615-metre (2,018 ft)
- Coordinates: 28°28′49.12″N 118°21′36.77″E

Naming
- Native name: 雨石山 (Chinese)

Geography
- Location: Dongyang Township, Guangfeng District, Shangrao, Jiangxi
- Country: China

Mount Yushi (Chinese: 雨石山; pinyin: Yǔshí Shān) is a 615 metres (2,018 ft) mountain in Dongyang township, Guangfeng District of Shangrao, Jiangxi, China. It is the highest mountain in the northeastern Guangfeng District. It belongs to Danxia landform. On the top of the mountain, there is a Buddhist temple named "Yushi Temple" (雨石庵).
