= 2014 Thespakusatsu Gunma season =

Thespakusatsu Gunma
2014 season
- Manager: Tadahiro Akiba
- Stadium: Shoda Shoyu Stadium Gunma
- J2 League: 18th

2014 Thespakusatsu Gunma season.

== J2 League ==
Match	Date	Team	Score	Team	Venue	Attendance
1	2014.03.02	V-Varen Nagasaki	2-0	Thespakusatsu Gunma	Nagasaki Stadium	5,248
2	2014.03.09	Thespakusatsu Gunma	1-0	Tokyo Verdy	Shoda Shoyu Stadium Gunma	3,855
3	2014.03.16	Fagiano Okayama	1-2	Thespakusatsu Gunma	Kanko Stadium	6,312
4	2014.03.22	Tochigi SC	3-0	Thespakusatsu Gunma	Tochigi Green Stadium	4,174
5	2014.03.30	Thespakusatsu Gunma	2-0	Kataller Toyama	Shoda Shoyu Stadium Gunma	1,814
6	2014.04.05	Júbilo Iwata	2-0	Thespakusatsu Gunma	Yamaha Stadium	7,014
7	2014.04.13	Thespakusatsu Gunma	0-1	Mito HollyHock	Shoda Shoyu Stadium Gunma	6,407
8	2014.04.20	Consadole Sapporo	1-0	Thespakusatsu Gunma	Sapporo Dome	8,536
9	2014.04.26	Thespakusatsu Gunma	1-2	Avispa Fukuoka	Shoda Shoyu Stadium Gunma	2,100
10	2014.04.29	FC Gifu	1-0	Thespakusatsu Gunma	Gifu Nagaragawa Stadium	3,870
11	2014.05.03	JEF United Chiba	3-2	Thespakusatsu Gunma	Fukuda Denshi Arena	11,833
12	2014.05.06	Thespakusatsu Gunma	1-1	Montedio Yamagata	Shoda Shoyu Stadium Gunma	2,787
13	2014.05.11	Thespakusatsu Gunma	1-0	Kamatamare Sanuki	Shoda Shoyu Stadium Gunma	2,929
14	2014.05.18	Giravanz Kitakyushu	2-1	Thespakusatsu Gunma	Honjo Stadium	2,766
15	2014.05.24	Kyoto Sanga FC	0-3	Thespakusatsu Gunma	Kyoto Nishikyogoku Athletic Stadium	9,085
16	2014.05.31	Thespakusatsu Gunma	0-2	Yokohama FC	Shoda Shoyu Stadium Gunma	4,115
17	2014.06.07	Ehime FC	0-2	Thespakusatsu Gunma	Ningineer Stadium	2,057
18	2014.06.14	Thespakusatsu Gunma	1-1	Roasso Kumamoto	Shoda Shoyu Stadium Gunma	2,461
19	2014.06.21	Matsumoto Yamaga FC	3-1	Thespakusatsu Gunma	Matsumotodaira Park Stadium	9,728
20	2014.06.28	Thespakusatsu Gunma	2-1	Oita Trinita	Shoda Shoyu Stadium Gunma	3,795
21	2014.07.05	Thespakusatsu Gunma	0-1	Shonan Bellmare	Shoda Shoyu Stadium Gunma	3,986
22	2014.07.20	Mito HollyHock	2-0	Thespakusatsu Gunma	K's denki Stadium Mito	5,776
23	2014.07.26	Montedio Yamagata	1-2	Thespakusatsu Gunma	ND Soft Stadium Yamagata	5,471
24	2014.07.30	Thespakusatsu Gunma	0-0	Giravanz Kitakyushu	Shoda Shoyu Stadium Gunma	2,221
25	2014.08.03	Roasso Kumamoto	0-1	Thespakusatsu Gunma	Umakana-Yokana Stadium	4,870
26	2014.08.10	Thespakusatsu Gunma	2-4	V-Varen Nagasaki	Kumagaya Athletic Stadium	1,509
27	2014.08.17	Thespakusatsu Gunma	2-2	FC Gifu	Shoda Shoyu Stadium Gunma	4,309
28	2014.08.24	Oita Trinita	2-1	Thespakusatsu Gunma	Oita Bank Dome	8,087
29	2014.08.31	Thespakusatsu Gunma	1-3	Matsumoto Yamaga FC	Shoda Shoyu Stadium Gunma	3,859
30	2014.09.06	Yokohama FC	1-0	Thespakusatsu Gunma	NHK Spring Mitsuzawa Football Stadium	7,152
31	2014.09.14	Thespakusatsu Gunma	0-1	Kyoto Sanga FC	Shoda Shoyu Stadium Gunma	4,029
32	2014.09.20	Thespakusatsu Gunma	3-0	Consadole Sapporo	Shoda Shoyu Stadium Gunma	5,597
33	2014.09.23	Kataller Toyama	0-1	Thespakusatsu Gunma	Toyama Stadium	4,698
34	2014.09.28	Thespakusatsu Gunma	2-0	Tochigi SC	Shoda Shoyu Stadium Gunma	3,608
35	2014.10.04	Kamatamare Sanuki	1-0	Thespakusatsu Gunma	Kagawa Marugame Stadium	1,827
36	2014.10.11	Thespakusatsu Gunma	3-2	Fagiano Okayama	Shoda Shoyu Stadium Gunma	2,960
37	2014.10.19	Avispa Fukuoka	1-1	Thespakusatsu Gunma	Level5 Stadium	4,096
38	2014.10.26	Thespakusatsu Gunma	1-2	JEF United Chiba	Shoda Shoyu Stadium Gunma	5,805
39	2014.11.01	Shonan Bellmare	1-0	Thespakusatsu Gunma	Shonan BMW Stadium Hiratsuka	5,963
40	2014.11.09	Thespakusatsu Gunma	1-1	Júbilo Iwata	Shoda Shoyu Stadium Gunma	5,635
41	2014.11.15	Tokyo Verdy	1-1	Thespakusatsu Gunma	Ajinomoto Stadium	3,788
42	2014.11.23	Thespakusatsu Gunma	3-2	Ehime FC	Shoda Shoyu Stadium Gunma	5,180
