= Hitomi Ishikawa =

Musical artist (born 1959)

- Born: 石川ひとみ (Ishikawa Hitomi); September 20, 1959 (age 66)
- Origin: Nishi-ku, Nagoya, Aichi prefecture, Japan
- Genres: Kayōkyoku; J-pop
- Occupation: Singer
- Instruments: Vocals; Guitars
- Years active: 1978–present
- Labels: NAV Records/Canyon Records/Pony Canyon; Victor Entertainment; Teichiku Records
- Website: ishikawahitomi.com

Hitomi Ishikawa (石川 ひとみ, Ishikawa Hitomi) (born September 20, 1959, Nishi-ku, Nagoya, Aichi prefecture, Japan) is a Japanese singer and voice actress. Her legal name is Hitomi Yamada since marrying fellow-musician Naoki Yamada, but she uses her maiden name of Ishikawa professionally. Her nickname is Hi-chan.

== Early life ==
When she was born, she had numerous wrinkles, a low nose, and small eyes, so her parents named her Hitomi (which uses the kanji for beauty) with the prayer that her facial features would become more pronounced. When she was two years old, she moved to Ama District near to Nagoya.

Hitomi was a tomboy in her childhood. In her sixth year at Masanori Elementary School, she was passionate about softball. Apart from sports, she started playing the piano around kindergarten, and when she was an elementary school student, she became interested in music after singing along to the record "Kuroneko no Tango" at home.

On March 19, 1972, when Hitomi was in sixth grade, she appeared on a TV program for the first time, singing Minami Saori’s "Shiokaze no Melody" on the CBC TV singing contest "Donguri Ongakukai" and winning second place. At Miwa Junior High School, she was a member of the soft tennis club and played as a forward in doubles. Even back then, she had big, cute eyes and was popular with the male students.

Hitomi enrolled in the Nagoya Junior College High School. She learned about the Tokyo Music Academy Nagoya Branch through an advertisement in the city, passed the entrance exam and began attending in November 1975, her first year of high school. However, after that, she was hospitalized with a duodenal ulcer, the monthly tuition fee increased, and her parents told her to "do something useful in the future, like tea ceremony or flower arrangement", so she gradually stopped attending and, as she said, "reluctantly" quit after about six months. After that, like many students, she planned to move on to the attached junior college.

However, in November of her second year of high school, Hitomi was encouraged to attend an audition for new singers at Watanabe Productions and, after taking the audition without much thought, she passed. After this she participated in the Fuji TV audition program "You're a Star!" where she became the champion. In the first week of the audition, she sang "Dream" by Hiromi Iwasaki, and despite forgetting the lyrics, causing the recording to be halted, went on to win seven weeks of "You're a Star!" and became the champion.

After her parents' gave her permission to follow her musical ambitions for 4 years, she joined Watanabe Productions and started working there. In March 1978, three days after graduating from high school, she moved to Tokyo and moved into the Watanabe Productions dormitory. Other dorm residents at the same time included Tomoko Kuwae and Miki Matsubara. During her dorm life, she often went bowling in Tachikawa on weekends with the two of them, as well as with two senior students who belonged to the duo The Lilies.

== Career as a recording artist ==
=== Idol debut ===
On May 25, 1978, Hitomi debuted as an idol singer with the song "Migimuke Migi" ("Turn Right") under Canyon Records' NAV Records. She was chosen as the "'78 Mascot Girl" by the National Beauty All Student Association, which is made up of 58 universities across the country, and her appearance and singing ability were highly praised from the time of her debut, earning her a large following, especially among university students. She was often featured in swimsuit photo shoots for men's magazines, but due to the Ise Bay Typhoon she experienced when she was six days old, she was afraid of water and did not own a single swimsuit before her debut.

From 1979 to 1982, she was a voice actress in the NHK puppet show "Prin Prin Monogatari", providing the voice of the lead character, Princess Prin Prin, and co-hosted the music program "Let's Go Young" on the same network with Yosuke Tagawa.

In 1981, Hitomi reached the four-year "time limit" that she had promised her parents. She had not had any hit songs up until then, and she had intended to quit singing, saying, "I don't want to continue with my career half-done." However, her 11th single, "Machibuse", was well-received and sold many copies, and while touring the country for the campaign, she decided not to quit. "Machibuse" had been at the top of the hit charts for a long time, and there was no prospect of releasing her next single, "Niwakaame". She postponed the release and instead released "Sanmai No Shashin," a cover of Seiko Miki's song, just like "Machibuse". "Niwakaame" was released two years later, on June 21, 1983, as her 16th single.

In 1981, she made her first appearance on the NHK New Year's Eve song contest Kouhaku Uta Gassen.

=== From the breakout to the onset of Hepatitis B ===
In February 1982, Hitomi's single "Hitorijime" was released, followed by "Kimi Wa Kagayaite Tenshi Ni Mieta" in May. While these were well received by fans, they did not sell many copies. In 1982, "Purple Mystery", written by high school student Kawagoe Susumu and sung by Ishikawa, was chosen as the best song of the year on NHK General TV's "Your Melody", and was released as a single in February 1983 with some lyrics revised.

In September 1983, Hitomi released "Koi" ("Love"). Seeking to break away from her idol image, she appeared in television dramas and published highly revealing gravure photos in magazine "GORO". She also published semi-nude gravure photos in "Sharaku" and "Playboy Eyes", and released a nude photo collection "Kokorogawari" (Change of Heart) in November 1984. In May 1985, She released the song "Yume Kaikisen", which was used as a commercial jingle for Naris Cosmetics.

"Secret Forest" was released in April 1986, and was the last single released under Canyon Records/NAV Records.

In 1987 (at the age of 27), Ishikawa starred in his first musical, "The Emperor's New Clothes", but was struck by severe dizziness during rehearsals less than a week before the performance. When she was examined at the hospital, it was discovered by chance that she had developed hepatitis B, and she was suddenly hospitalized. Hitomi's future husband, Yamada Naoki, supported her as a staff member, treating her the same as before she became ill, and providing her with emotional support.

=== After resuming activities after a hiatus ===
After being released from the hospital, Hitomi's contract with Watanabe Productions was terminated and she left the entertainment industry. However, she returned to work in 1988. At the time, there were severe prejudices against Hepatitis B sufferers in Japan, and while, in her own case, she had become a carrier of Hepatitis B through mother-to-child transmission, she suffered hardships due to misunderstandings and prejudice about the disease. The most painful thing for her was that after she made her illness public, people would refuse to shake her hand in the street, and she was told by her swimming class attendees to "quit classes because the disease will spread if we swim in the same pool".

A big fan of Tora-san from the movie Otoko wa Tsurai yo, she and her friend Yuko Saito went on a "Shibamata tour" around the Shibamata area where the movie was shot. In March 1990, while visiting a hotel lounge for a newspaper interview, she encountered Kiyoshi Atsumi, who played Tora-san. They exchanged with autographes.

In 1993 (at the age of 34), she married Naoki Yamada, a composer and arranger who had been in her backing band since her debut. They did not have a wedding ceremony, but instead went on a trip to Belgium together. Since then, she has been active in family-oriented activities, such as appearing on the NHK Educational TV program Mother and Child TV Time for two years from 1997 (performing with her stuffed toy Nyanchoo).

Since then, he has released a CD album with Japanese guitar ichigoichie, and has also given lectures on AIDS and hepatitis, and has written a book about his battle with illness called "Let's Swim Together" ("Shueisha").

=== Recent activities ===
At the end of 2015, she began performing live at the Amuse Cafe Theater in Asakusa, mainly performing original songs from their idol days.

In 2018, the 40th anniversary of her debut, she released her ninth original album, "Watashi no Mainichi", her first in 35 years since "Private" in 1983. She held a live concert to celebrate the album release in July, a 40th anniversary concert in October, and additional shows in Tokyo and Nagoya in February 2019.

In April 2021, she held her first live broadcast, and in May, she released her first DVD, "Ishikawa Hitomi LIVE: My Everyday Life."

In March 2022, she released her first Blu-ray work, "Ishikawa Hitomi Concert 2021," which features a concert with an audience at TOKYO FM Hall.

On the August 23, 2023, at broadcast of the TV Asahi program "Tetsuko's Room", she revealed that she has been battling Sjögren syndrome, a designated intractable disease, for the past 11 years. She also suffers from some other serious illnesses.

In 2023, the 45th anniversary of their debut, they will release their 10th original album "Egao no Hana", hold the "45th Anniversary Concert ~Egao no Hana~" in October, hold their second Billboard concert since 2021 in Osaka and Yokohama in November, and hold a concert at the Marunouchi Cotton Club in Tokyo in July 2024. She wrote some song texts for this album.
