= Keiji Obiki =

Japanese baseball player (born 1984)

Keiji Ohbiki
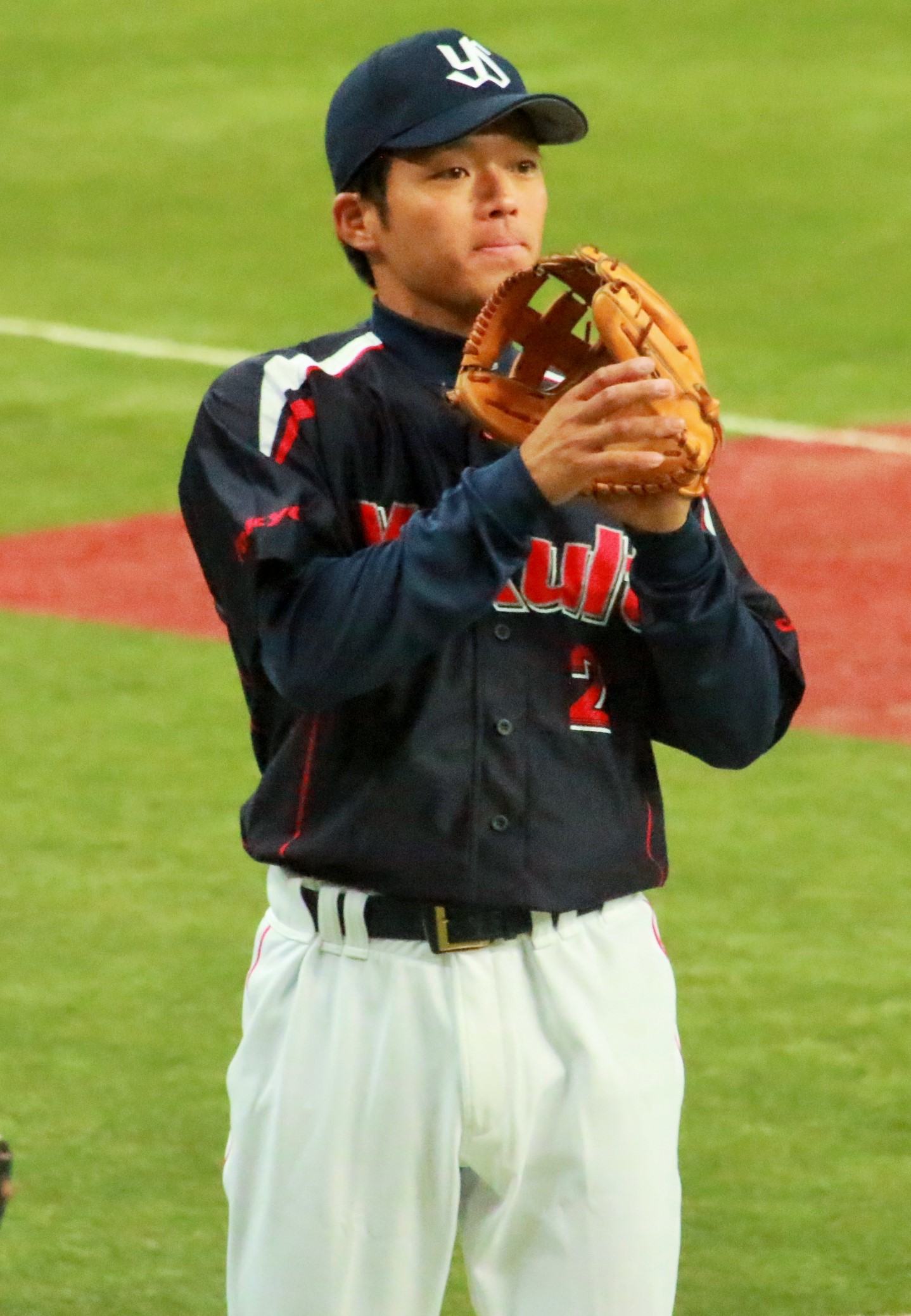
- Obiki with the Swallows

Saitama Seibu Lions – No. 80
- Shortstop / Coach
- Born: June 29, 1984 (age 41); Osaka, Japan
- Batted: Right Threw: Right

NPB debut
- March 24, 2007, for the Orix Buffaloes

Last appearance
- September 3, 2019, for the Tokyo Yakult Swallows

Career statistics
- Batting average: .251
- Home runs: 48
- Runs batted in: 356
- Hits: 1,004
- Stats at Baseball Reference

Teams
- As player: Orix Buffaloes (2007–2012); Hokkaido Nippon-Ham Fighters (2013–2014); Tokyo Yakult Swallows (2015–2019); As coach: Saitama Seibu Lions (2025–)

Keiji Ohbiki (Japanese:大引 啓次, born June 29, 1984) is a Japanese professional baseball shortstop who is a free agent. He previously played for the Orix Buffaloes, Hokkaido Nippon-Ham Fighters and Tokyo Yakult Swallows of the Nippon Professional Baseball (NPB).

On December 2, 2019, he become free agent.
