= Kenta Abe =

Japanese baseball player (born 1984)

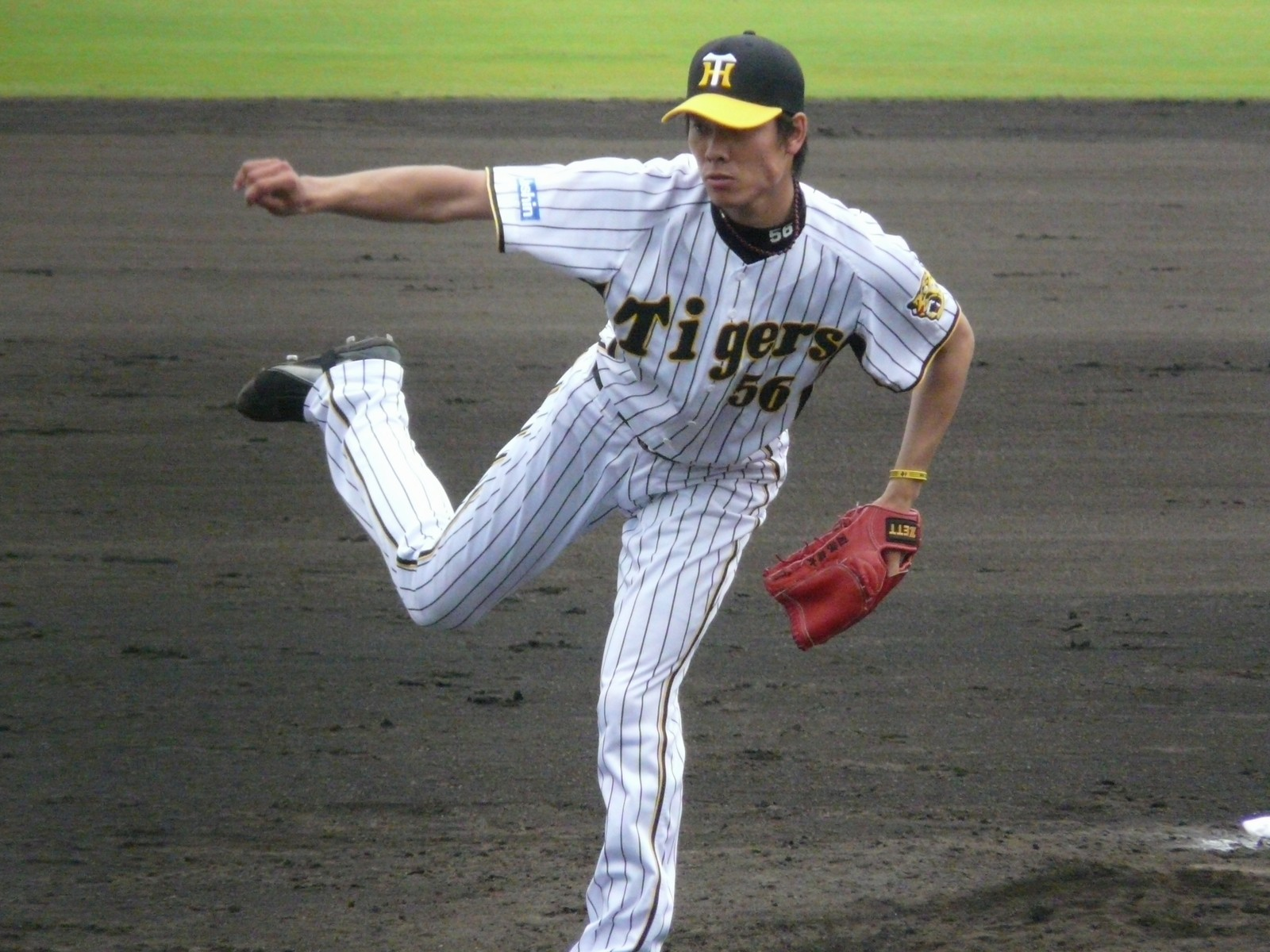
- Abe with the Hanshin Tigers
- Pitcher
- Born: September 8, 1984 (age 41); Matsuyama, Ehime, Japan
- Bats: Left Throws: Right

NPB debut
- August 26, 2003, for the Osaka Kintetsu Buffaloes

NPB statistics (through 2015 season)
- Win–loss: 3–3
- ERA: 4.51
- Strikeouts: 133

Teams
- Osaka Kintetsu Buffaloes (2003 – 2004); Orix Buffaloes (2005 – 2007); Hanshin Tigers (2008 – 2011); Tokyo Yakult Swallows (2012 – 2014, 2015)
- Last updated on: April 9, 2010

Kenta Abe (阿部 健太, Abe Kenta; born September 8, 1984) is a right-handed professional baseball pitcher for the Tokyo Yakult Swallows in Nippon Professional Baseball. He was the number 4 draft pick for the Osaka Kintetsu Buffaloes in 2003. During his high school days, he played at Koshien Stadium.
