= 2015 Thespakusatsu Gunma season =

Thespakusatsu Gunma
2015 season
- Manager: Hiroki Hattori
- Stadium: Shoda Shoyu Stadium Gunma
- J2 League: 18th

2015 Thespakusatsu Gunma season.

== J2 League ==
=== League table ===
Pos	Team	Pld	W	D	L	GF	GA	GD	Pts
17	Kyoto Sanga	42	12	14	16	45	51	−6	50
18	Thespakusatsu Gunma	42	13	9	20	34	56	−22	48
19	Mito HollyHock	42	10	16	16	40	47	−7	46

Source: Meiji Yasuda J2 League Standing
Rules for classification: 1) Points; 2) Goal difference; 3) Goals scored

=== Match details ===
J2 League match details
Match	Date	Team	Score	Team	Venue	Attendance
1	2015.03.08	Thespakusatsu Gunma	0-1	Yokohama FC	Shoda Shoyu Stadium Gunma	11,198
2	2015.03.15	Roasso Kumamoto	2-2	Thespakusatsu Gunma	Kumamoto Suizenji Stadium	5,075
3	2015.03.21	Thespakusatsu Gunma	1-1	Oita Trinita	Shoda Shoyu Stadium Gunma	4,135
4	2015.03.29	Giravanz Kitakyushu	0-1	Thespakusatsu Gunma	Honjo Stadium	2,267
5	2015.04.01	Thespakusatsu Gunma	0-1	V-Varen Nagasaki	Shoda Shoyu Stadium Gunma	1,767
6	2015.04.05	Zweigen Kanazawa	2-1	Thespakusatsu Gunma	Ishikawa Athletics Stadium	1,701
7	2015.04.11	Thespakusatsu Gunma	0-1	Ehime FC	Shoda Shoyu Stadium Gunma	3,228
8	2015.04.19	Cerezo Osaka	1-2	Thespakusatsu Gunma	Yanmar Stadium Nagai	17,212
9	2015.04.26	Tokyo Verdy	2-0	Thespakusatsu Gunma	Ajinomoto Stadium	3,056
10	2015.04.29	Thespakusatsu Gunma	1-0	Kamatamare Sanuki	Shoda Shoyu Stadium Gunma	2,530
11	2015.05.03	Kyoto Sanga FC	0-1	Thespakusatsu Gunma	Kyoto Nishikyogoku Athletic Stadium	6,289
12	2015.05.06	Avispa Fukuoka	4-1	Thespakusatsu Gunma	Level5 Stadium	6,724
13	2015.05.09	Thespakusatsu Gunma	0-2	Omiya Ardija	Shoda Shoyu Stadium Gunma	6,380
14	2015.05.17	Thespakusatsu Gunma	0-2	Consadole Sapporo	Shoda Shoyu Stadium Gunma	4,701
15	2015.05.24	Júbilo Iwata	1-2	Thespakusatsu Gunma	Yamaha Stadium	9,223
16	2015.05.31	Thespakusatsu Gunma	2-0	JEF United Chiba	Shoda Shoyu Stadium Gunma	4,557
17	2015.06.06	Tochigi SC	5-1	Thespakusatsu Gunma	Tochigi Green Stadium	4,525
18	2015.06.14	Thespakusatsu Gunma	1-1	Fagiano Okayama	Shoda Shoyu Stadium Gunma	2,312
19	2015.06.21	Thespakusatsu Gunma	0-1	Mito HollyHock	Shoda Shoyu Stadium Gunma	2,398
20	2015.06.28	FC Gifu	1-1	Thespakusatsu Gunma	Gifu Nagaragawa Stadium	8,517
21	2015.07.04	Thespakusatsu Gunma	2-1	Tokushima Vortis	Shoda Shoyu Stadium Gunma	2,781
22	2015.07.08	Thespakusatsu Gunma	1-1	Roasso Kumamoto	Shoda Shoyu Stadium Gunma	1,618
23	2015.07.12	JEF United Chiba	1-2	Thespakusatsu Gunma	Fukuda Denshi Arena	8,123
24	2015.07.18	Thespakusatsu Gunma	1-0	Tochigi SC	Shoda Shoyu Stadium Gunma	3,337
25	2015.07.22	V-Varen Nagasaki	1-0	Thespakusatsu Gunma	Nagasaki Stadium	2,289
26	2015.07.26	Oita Trinita	2-0	Thespakusatsu Gunma	Oita Bank Dome	15,152
28	2015.08.08	Kamatamare Sanuki	0-1	Thespakusatsu Gunma	Kagawa Marugame Stadium	2,532
29	2015.08.15	Thespakusatsu Gunma	1-0	Zweigen Kanazawa	Shoda Shoyu Stadium Gunma	3,019
30	2015.08.23	Omiya Ardija	1-1	Thespakusatsu Gunma	NACK5 Stadium Omiya	9,091
27	2015.08.26	Thespakusatsu Gunma	0-1	FC Gifu	Shoda Shoyu Stadium Gunma	1,824
31	2015.09.13	Thespakusatsu Gunma	1-3	Tokyo Verdy	Shoda Shoyu Stadium Gunma	3,375
32	2015.09.20	Fagiano Okayama	3-0	Thespakusatsu Gunma	City Light Stadium	6,729
33	2015.09.23	Thespakusatsu Gunma	2-3	Júbilo Iwata	Shoda Shoyu Stadium Gunma	11,303
34	2015.09.27	Consadole Sapporo	0-0	Thespakusatsu Gunma	Sapporo Dome	11,570
35	2015.10.04	Thespakusatsu Gunma	1-1	Kyoto Sanga FC	Shoda Shoyu Stadium Gunma	3,914
36	2015.10.10	Tokushima Vortis	0-1	Thespakusatsu Gunma	Pocarisweat Stadium	3,307
37	2015.10.18	Thespakusatsu Gunma	2-0	Cerezo Osaka	Shoda Shoyu Stadium Gunma	6,916
38	2015.10.25	Ehime FC	3-0	Thespakusatsu Gunma	Ningineer Stadium	2,808
39	2015.11.01	Mito HollyHock	0-0	Thespakusatsu Gunma	K's denki Stadium Mito	5,187
40	2015.11.08	Thespakusatsu Gunma	0-4	Avispa Fukuoka	Shoda Shoyu Stadium Gunma	2,239
41	2015.11.14	Thespakusatsu Gunma	1-2	Giravanz Kitakyushu	Shoda Shoyu Stadium Gunma	2,545
42	2015.11.23	Yokohama FC	1-0	Thespakusatsu Gunma	NHK Spring Mitsuzawa Football Stadium	4,437
