= Kayo Yamaguchi =

Japanese painter (1899–1984)

Kayo Yamaguchi (山口 華楊, Yamaguchi Kayō; 3 October 1899 – 16 March 1984) was a Japanese painter specializing in the Nihonga style of watercolour painting.

== Biography ==
He was born in the Nakagyo ward of Kyoto.

Kayo studied under Nishimura Go'un. He supervised the 画塾晨鳥社. With a sketch-based painting style, he specialized in representations of animals. In 1981 he was awarded the Japanese order of culture.

His real name was "Yamaguchi Yonejiro(山口米次郎)."

He participated in Takeuchi Seho's study group because of Goun's recommendation.

In 1927 and 1928, he was awarded special prize for the exhibition of the imperial art academy.

He painted not only animals but also flowers and plants very well.

He also worked at art school (in Nagaoka joshi art school and Kyoto city specialist school of painting) as a teacher.

April 1912, he studied under Nishimura Goun.

October 1916, he was selected for the Bunten exhibition.

March 1919, he graduated from the Kyoto city specialist school of painting.

October 1927, he was awarded a special prize for the exhibition of the imperial art academy.

October 1928, he was awarded a special prize for the exhibition of the imperial art academy.

May 1936, he became an assistant professor of Kyoto city specialist school of painting.

October 1936, he adjudicated in Shin-bunten, Kyoten, Nitten and Shin-nitten.

November 1938, he opened a painting school, Shincho sha.

March 1942, he became a professor of Kyoto city specialist school of painting.

November 1956, he was awarded Japan art academy prize.

November 1958, he became a councilor of Kyoto city art museum.

March 1969, he successively held the posts of director, auditor, executive director and advisor of corporation nitten.

November 1971, he was commended as a person of cultural merits of Kyoto City.

December 1971, he became a member of the Japan art academy.

November 1973, he was awarded the third class of the Order of the Sacred Treasure.

November 1980, he was designated a person of cultural merits.

November 1981, he was awarded the order of culture.

October 1982, he became an honored citizen of Kyoto City.

March 1984, he was awarded Junior third rank.
