= Hitomi Watanabe =

Japanese photographer

Hitomi Watanabe (渡辺 眸, Watanabe Hitomi; born March 23, 1939) is a Japanese photographer. Her photographs depict speeches, state violence and the aftermath of rioting.

== Biography ==
Watanabe was born on March 23, 1939, in Tokyo, Japan. After graduating from Meiji University, she began working for a publishing company. She then graduated from the Tokyo College of Photography in 1967. She published her first photo collection in 1968.

She came to prominence during the Zenkyoto student movement in the late 1960s, participating in the 1970 Anpo protests against the renewal of the Japan-US Mutual Security Treaty. When the treaty was renewed in 1970, Watanabe began drinking fairly heavily as a way to deal with their failure to prevent it.

In 1972 Watanabe took their first trip to India. They went back and forth between India and Japan for several years, then decided to remain in India. The first exhibition of their photographs taken in India was in 1976, and they had several others in later decades.

== Bibliography ==
- Watanabe, Hitomi (1968). 新宿コンテンポラリー.
- Watanabe, Hitomi (1983). 天竺.
