= Yushi Aida =

Japanese baseball player

Yomiuri Giants
- Pitcher / Coach
- Born: January 30, 1984 (age 42); Saitama, Japan
- Batted: Right Threw: Right

debut
- April 1, 2007, for the Yomiuri Giants

Last appearance
- May 9, 2008, for the Yomiuri Giants

Career statistics
- Win–loss: 3-2
- ERA: 2.88
- Strikeouts: 17

Teams
- As player: Yomiuri Giants (2007–2009); As coach: Yomiuri Giants (2010–2022, 2026–present)

Yushi Aida (会田 有志, Aida Yushi; born January 30, 1984 in Saitama, Japan) is a Nippon Professional Baseball player for the Yomiuri Giants.
