= Ryunosuke Okamoto =

Japanese footballer

Ryunosuke Okamoto 岡本 竜之介
Personal information
- Full name: Ryunosuke Okamoto
- Date of birth: October 9, 1984 (age 42)
- Place of birth: Tsuyama, Okayama, Japan
- Height: 1.78 m (5 ft 10 in)
- Position: Midfielder

Youth career
- 2000–2002: Tamano Konan High School

Senior career*
Years	Team	Apps	(Gls)
2003–2005	Gamba Osaka	0	(0)
2005–2007	Tokushima Vortis	41	(1)
2008–2009	Kamatamare Sanuki	20	(4)
2009–2011	FC Osaka		
Total		61	(5)
Medal record
Gamba Osaka
Winner	J1 League	2005
Runner-up	J.League Cup	2005
- * Club domestic league appearances and goals

Ryunosuke Okamoto (岡本 竜之介, Okamoto Ryunosuke; born October 9, 1984) is a former Japanese football player.

== Club statistics ==
Club performance			League		Cup		League Cup		Total	
Season	Club	League	Apps	Goals	Apps	Goals	Apps	Goals	Apps	Goals
Japan			League		Emperor's Cup		J.League Cup		Total	
2003	Gamba Osaka	J1 League	0	0	0	0	0	0	0	0
2004	Gamba Osaka	J1 League	0	0	0	0	0	0	0	0
2005	Gamba Osaka	J1 League	0	0	0	0	2	0	2	0
2005	Tokushima Vortis	J2 League	8	0	1	0	-		9	0
2006	Tokushima Vortis	J2 League	16	0	1	0	-		17	0
2007	Tokushima Vortis	J2 League	17	1	0	0	-		17	1
2008	Kamatamare Sanuki	Regional Leagues	10	4	1	0	-		11	4
2009	Kamatamare Sanuki	Regional Leagues	10	0	0	0	-		10	0
2009	FC Osaka	Prefectural Leagues	0	0	-		-		0	0
2010	FC Osaka	Prefectural Leagues								
Career total			61	5	3	0	2	0	66	5
