= Boku ga Mitakatta Aozora =

Japanese girl group

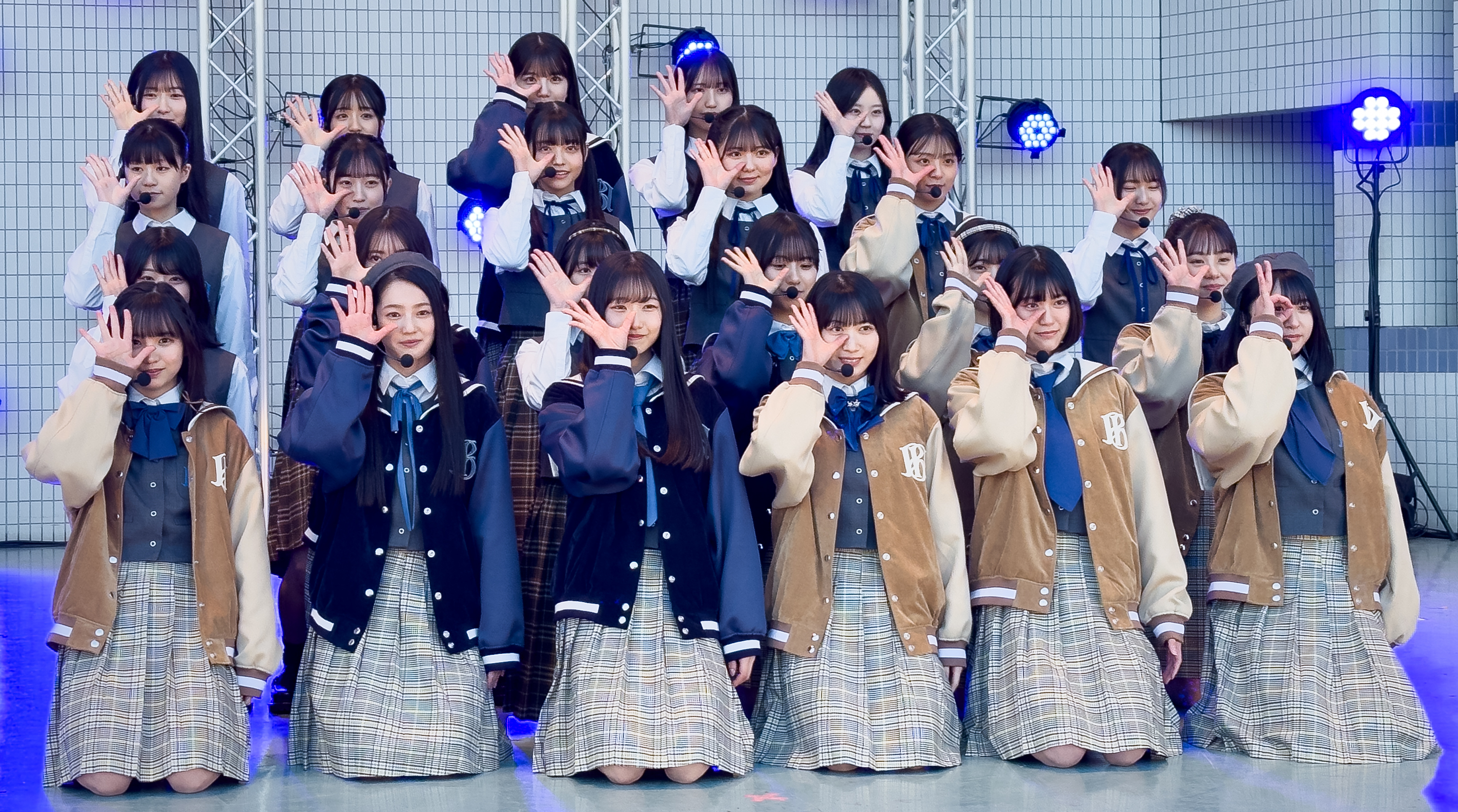
- Boku ga Mitakatta Aozora in December 2023

Background information
- Also known as: BokuAo
- Origin: Tokyo, Japan
- Genres: J-pop
- Years active: 2023–present
- Label: Avex Trax
- Members: See members
- Past members: See past members
- Website: bokuao.com

Boku ga Mitakatta Aozora (Japanese: 僕が見たかった青空; lit. 'The blue sky I (Note: Japanese first-person pronoun with an implication of boyishness.) wanted to see'), often abbreviated as BokuAo (僕青), is a Japanese girl group signed to Avex Trax and managed by Ligareaz Management. Formed and produced by record producer Yasushi Akimoto, they are officially labelled as an "official rival" of girl group Nogizaka46, whose also produced by Akimoto. The group was announced on June 15, 2023, and debuted on August 30 with the single "Aozora ni Tsuite Kangaeru".

== History ==
On February 1, 2023, Ligareaz Management announced a formation of the "official rival" of girl group Nogizaka46, as the first part of the company's Ganbare! Nippon no Idol project, aiming to boost Japanese idol culture. An audition began in the same month, and the final audition took place on April 22. On June 15, Ligareaz held a press conference in Tokyo to reveal the group's name "Boku ga Mitakatta Aozora", and introduce 23 selected members out of 35,678 applicants. On the same day, the group announced the debut single "Aozora ni Tsuite Kangaeru" to be released on August 30. Toa Yagi served as the choreographic center.

On October 18, the group's late night variety show Sakamichi no Mukō ni wa Aozora ga Hirogatte Ita was first aired. They held their first concert Boku ga Mitakatta One Man Live Vol. 0 at New Pier Hall, Tokyo on December 19. The group received New Artist Award and was nominated for Best New Artist Award at the 65th Japan Record Awards. On January 31, 2024, Boku ga Mitakatta Aozora released their second single "Sotsugyō made". It was the first single to use senbatsu system, which chose 12 members to participate the A-side, called "Aozora Gumi"; non-chosen members were called "Kumo Gumi". The single topped the Billboard Japan Top Singles Sales, and reached number two on the Oricon Singles Chart. Three singles were released afterwards: "Spare no Nai Koi" in August 2024, "Suki Sugite Up and Down" in November 2024, and "Koi wa Baisoku" in March 2025.

== Other ventures ==
=== Endorsements ===
In August 2023, Boku ga Mitakatta Aozora was selected as image character for the rental property vacancy information services company Chintai.

== Members ==
- Yūho Aoki (青木 宙帆)
- Rian Akita (秋田 莉杏)
- Aoi Annō (安納 蒼衣)
- Yuzu Itō (伊藤 ゆず)
- Yuki Imai (今井 優希)
- Riko Iwamoto (岩本 理瑚)
- Ami Kanazawa (金澤 亜美)
- Ai Kinoshita (木下 藍) - hiatus from Oct. 1st, 2025
- Yua Kudō (工藤 唯愛) - hiatus from Aug. 31st, 2026
- Nana Shiogama (塩釜 菜那) – leader
- Eren Sugiura (杉浦 英恋)
- Miuna Sunaga (須永 心海)
- Aya Nishimori (西森 杏弥)
- Kokoka Hagiwara (萩原 心花)
- Hitomi Hasegawa (長谷川 稀未)
- Suzuki Hayasaki (早﨑 すずき)
- Yuria Miyakoshi (宮腰 友里亜)
- Miisa Yaegashi (八重樫 美伊咲)
- Toa Yagi (八木 仁愛)
- Karen Yanagihori (柳堀 花怜) - assistant leader
- Cocona Yoshimoto (吉本 此那)

=== Past members ===
- Mana Mochinaga (持永 真奈)
- Yuan Yamaguchi (山口 結杏)

== Discography ==
=== Singles ===
List of singles, showing year released, selected chart positions, and album name
Title	Year	Peaks			Certifications	Album
Title	Year	JPN	JPN Cmb.	JPN Hot	Certifications	Album
"Aozora ni Tsuite Kangaeru"	2023	3	9	23		TBA
"Sotsugyō made"	2024	2	4	8		TBA
"Spare no Nai Koi"	2024	2	2	4		TBA
"Suki Sugite Up and Down"	2024	5	5	4		TBA
"Koi wa Baisoku"	2025	3	3	5		TBA
"Shisen no Love Letter"	2025	2	2	3	RIAJ: Gold (phy.)	TBA
"Are wa Fairy"	2025	2	2	2	RIAJ: Gold (phy.)	TBA
"Funky Summer"	2026	4	4	4	RIAJ: Gold (phy.)	TBA

== Filmography ==
=== Television ===
Title	Year	Role	Note	Ref.
Sakamichi no Mukō ni wa Aozora ga Hirogatte Ita	2023–2025	Themselves	Variety show	

=== Plays ===
Title	Year	Role	Ref.
Natsugasumi	2024	Various	

== Concerts ==
Tours

- Boku ga Mitakatta National Tour 2025 (2025)

One-off

- Boku ga Mitakatta One Man Live Vol. 0 (2023)
- Boku ga Mitakatta Aozora Kumo Gumi Solo Performance (2024–)
- Boku ga Mitakatta One Man Live Vol. 1 (2024)
- Aozora Summer Festival 2024 (2024)
- BokuAo Sai 2024 (2024)
- Boku ga Mitakatta Aozora One Man Live: 2024 Seishun Osame (2024)

== Awards and nominations ==
Name of the award ceremony, year presented, award category, nominee(s) of the award, and the result of the nomination
Award ceremony	Year	Category	Nominee(s)/work(s)	Result	Ref.
Japan Record Awards	2023	New Artist Award	Boku ga Mitakatta Aozora	Won	
Japan Record Awards	2023	Best New Artist	Boku ga Mitakatta Aozora	Nominated	
