= Hitomi Aizawa =

Japanese actress

- Born: August 22, 1982 (age 43); Tokyo, Japan
- Occupations: Gravure idol; race queen; actress
- Spouse: unknown (m. 2019)
- Children: 1
- Website: http://ameblo.jp/i-hito/

Hitomi Aizawa (相澤 仁美, Aizawa Hitomi; born 22 August 1982 in Tokyo, Japan) is a Japanese actress, gravure idol and race queen.

In a 2006 article on an "Air Guitar roadshow" in which Aizawa participated, the website cinematopics.com noted that she was the top idol of the gravure world. Among the films in which Aizawa has appeared are Drift (ドリフト; 2006), Hitorimake (ヒトリマケ; 2008), and Cool Girls (クールガールズ; 2009) In 2006, she appeared in an episode of the Tokyo MX drama Tantei Boogie (探偵ブギ). The website cinematopics.com interviewed Aizawa about her role in the film Open Water 2 (オープン・ウォーター２; 2007), which was based on a true disaster-survival story. In September 2009, Aizawa starred as the title character in a DVD version of the 1980s manga series, Miss Machiko. Advertising for the release made much of Aizawa's prominent bustline.

== Works ==
=== DVDs ===
- [2005.05.20] Hitomi no Naka
- [2005.08.26] H (ecchi)
- [2005.11.25] Best of You
- [200x.xx.xx] Hitomi wo Mitsumete
- [2006.02.20] I Zawa Hoshimi: Futari
- [2006.02.20] I Zawa Hoshimi: Kirei
- [2006.05.26] Hitomi Crisis!
- [200x.xx.xx] 青春ダイナミック 1,2,3

=== Photobooks ===
- [2005.04.xx] I am I
- [2006.02.25] Hitomi Crisis!

=== Singles ===
- [2006.07.26] Himitsu no Bonbaa (as OOPARTS)
- [2008.01.16] Hayaku Shiteyo
