= Aoi (Japanese singer) =

Japanese visual kei rock musician

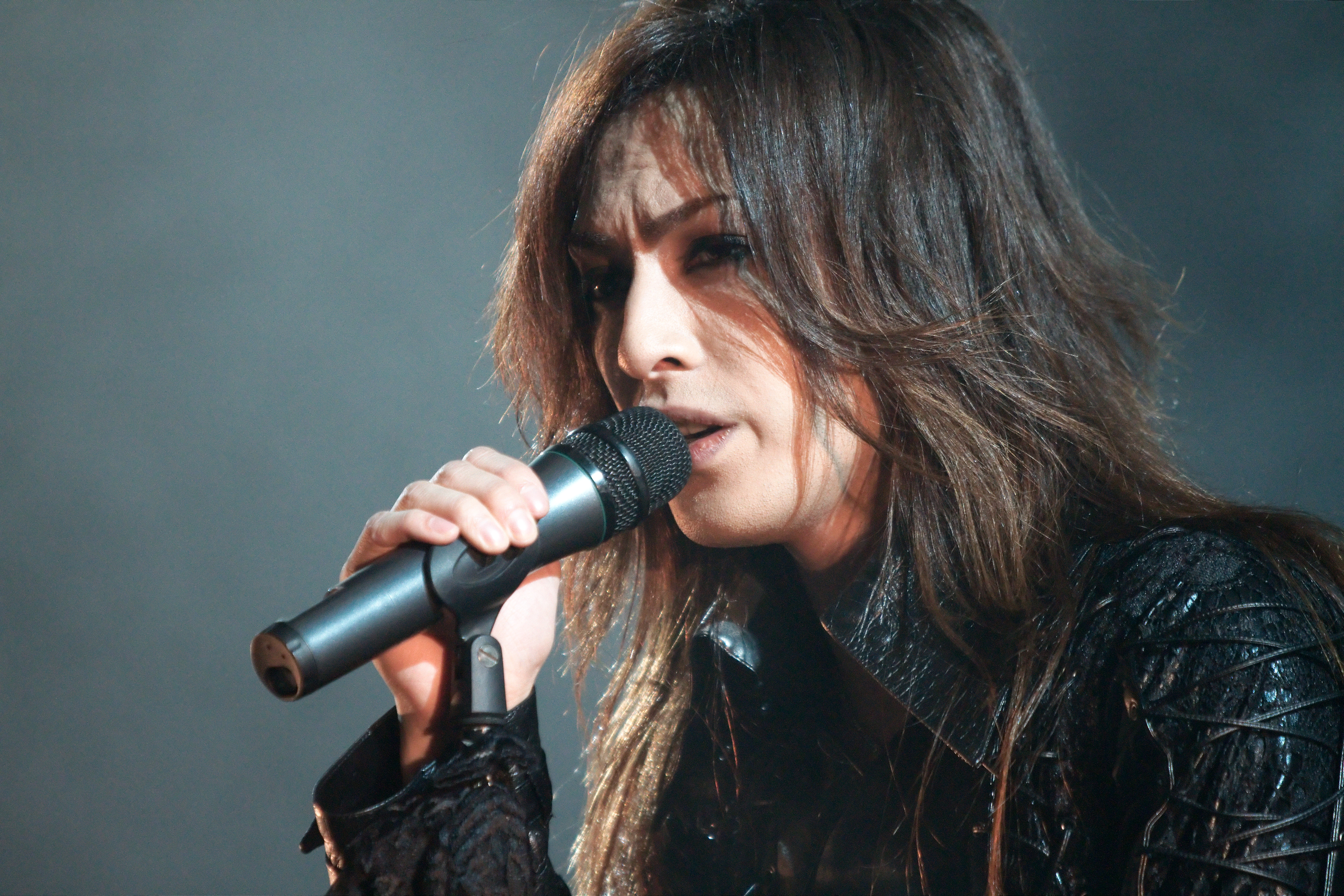
- Aoi during the Japan Expo Sud 2010
- Born: 4 June 1984 (age 42); Japan
- Occupation: Singer
- Musical career
- Genres: Rock
- Years active: 2005–present

Aoi (born 4 June 1984) is a Japanese visual kei rock musician.

== Biography ==
Aoi first created Japanese visual kei rock band Bounty with Kazuya (ex Fanatic Crisis), who he met at their management company.

=== 2008 ===
In 2008, he performed his first concert at the Takadanobaba Arena on 18 January, then two other concerts at the Holiday Shinjuku 9 and 22 February, on 18 April he returned to the Takadanobaba Arena for an event named "Shock Wave (Aporo vol.13)". He released his second single, "Eden", on 28 May then started again his concerts from May to June: the 29 at the Takadanobaba Arena, 13 June at the Kanazawa Az, the day after at Niigata Club Junk Box and 20 June at Sendai Hook. Aoi released his first album, Veil, on 25 June before travelling to France for the Japan Expo 9e Impact.

He returned to Japan for a concert at Shibuya O-West 23 July, this day he participated to the compilation of the CD of the media Barks named Visual Bloom vol.1. He then performed a series of concerts from August to December, participated to the Chibi Japan Expo, performed a concert on 17 October at Shibuya Ruido K2 and celebrated his 1 year of career at the E.L.L Nagoya.

=== 2009 ===
In 2009, Aoi released his third single, "Masquerade", on 25 February, gave a concert on 28 February at Urawa Narcisse and 10 April at Ikebukuro Cyber. On 13 June, he gave a concert at the Japantag in Düsseldorf, in Germany. He went to the Japan Expo 10e impact where he performed a concert on 5 July. It was also the day when his first one-man live, named Virgin Blue, was announced. Two dates: one at the end of July of Germany and the second on 1 August at La Locomotive, in Paris. "Virgine Blue" is the name of the photobook Aoi made at Chateau de la Roche-Guyon in France. It was on 16 September that he released his fourth single, "Virgin". On 18 September, he participated in "Shock Wave Aporo Vol.30" at Takadanobaba Area. He also participated at the "V-Rock Festival '09" as Bounty's singer on 24 October and as Aoi on 25 October. At the end of October, he went to the Chibi Japan Expo in France, for signing sessions and a press conference. On 22 November, he returned in Japan for a one-man live performance with Bounty at Shinjuku Marz and celebrated his two years of solo career on 12 December at the same live house.

=== 2010 ===
In 2010, he performed a private concert for the members of the Maxim fanclub on 13 February at Ikebukuro Black Hole, went for the first time at the Japan Expo Sud on 25 February and released his last single as Bounty's singer on 13 March at the Shibuya Ruido K2.

Before his throat infection was announced, Aoi planned a Euro Tour titled "Romanesque", for which the dates were: 18 April at La Scène Bastille (Paris, France), 20 April at Nosturi (Helsinki, Finland), 22 April at Nachtleben (Frankfurt, Germany) and 23 April at Spektakulum (Düsseldorf, Germany). He also planned to do a concert at Shibuya O-WestT on 7 August.

== Discography ==
=== Singles ===
- Vision (12 December 2007)
- Eden (28 May 2008)
- Masquerade (25 February 2009)
- Virgin (16 September 2009)

=== Albums ===
- Veil (25 June 2008)
- Requiem (18 November 2009)
