= List of Belgian football transfers winter 2019–20 =

This is a list of Belgian football transfers for the 2019–20 winter transfer window. Only transfers involving a team from the professional divisions are listed, including the 16 teams in the 2019–20 Belgian First Division A and the 8 teams playing in the 2019–20 Belgian First Division B.

The winter transfer window opens on 1 January 2020, although a few transfers may take place before that date. The window closes at midnight on 31 January 2020 although outgoing transfers might still happen to leagues in which the window is still open. Players without a club may join teams, either during or in between transfer windows.

== Sorted by date ==
=== December ===
Date	Name	Moving from	Moving to	Fee	Note
6 December 2019	Michael Amir Murillo	New York Red Bulls	Anderlecht	Undisclosed	
16 December 2019	Nader Ghandri	Antwerp	Westerlo	Free	
16 December 2019	Aron Sigurðarson	Start	Union SG	Undisclosed	
20 December 2019	Fiorin Durmishaj	Waasland-Beveren	Olympiacos	Loan Return	
20 December 2019	Anthony Limbombe	Standard Liège	Nantes	Loan Return	
23 December 2019	Fernando Canesin	Oostende	Athletico Paranaense	Undisclosed	
26 December 2019	Yuta Toyokawa	Eupen	Cerezo Osaka	Undisclosed	
29 December 2019	Clément Libertiaux	Excel Mouscron	La Louvière	Loan	
30 December 2019	Jean Marco Toualy	Kortrijk	Almería B	Undisclosed	

=== End of 2019 ===
Some players were on a loan which ended in 2019. As of 1 January 2020, they returned to their original club and are listed here. For a list of players on loan during the last year, see List of Belgian football transfers winter 2018–19 and summer 2019.

Date	Name	Moving from	Moving to	Fee	Note
End of 2019	Mohamed Buya Turay	Djurgårdens IF	Sint-Truiden	Loan Return	
End of 2019	Eric Smith	Tromsø	Gent	Loan Return	
End of 2019	Sebastjan Spahiu	Excel Mouscron	Free Agent	Released	

=== January ===
Date	Name	Moving from	Moving to	Fee	Note
1 January 2020	Baptiste Aloé	Valenciennes	Beerschot	Undisclosed	
2 January 2020	Frédéric Frans	Lierse Kempenzonen	Beerschot	Undisclosed	
2 January 2020	Réginal Goreux	Standard Liège	Free Agent	Retired	
2 January 2020	Alyson Santos Silva	Roeselare	Confiança	Undisclosed	
3 January 2020	Youssouph Badji	Casa Sports	Club Brugge	Undisclosed	
3 January 2020	Dylan Bronn	Gent	Metz	Undisclosed	
3 January 2020	Chris Philipps	Legia Warsaw	Lommel	Undisclosed	
3 January 2020	Amadou Sagna	Club Brugge	Oostende	Loan	
3 January 2020	Ben Santermans	Lommel	Lierse Kempenzonen	Loan	
3 January 2020	Kristian Thorstvedt	Viking	Genk	Undisclosed	
4 January 2020	Mats Møller Dæhli	St. Pauli	Genk	Undisclosed	
4 January 2020	Sanjin Lelić	Roeselare	Free Agent	Released	
4 January 2020	Pa Omar Babou	Superstars Academy	Lommel	Loan	
5 January 2020	Mamadou Sylla	Gent	Orenburg	Loan	
6 January 2020	Nguyễn Công Phượng	Sint-Truiden	Hoàng Anh Gia Lai	Loan Return	
6 January 2020	Dino Hotić	Maribor	Cercle Brugge	Undisclosed	
6 January 2020	Jakub Piotrowski	Genk	Waasland-Beveren	Loan	
7 January 2020	Alec Van Hoorenbeeck	Mechelen	Heist	Loan	
7 January 2020	Arno Van Keilegom	Mechelen	Heist	Loan	
7 January 2020	Rocky Bushiri	Norwich City	Sint-Truiden	Loan	
7 January 2020	Sulayman Marreh	Eupen	Gent	Undisclosed	
8 January 2020	Yohan Boli	Sint-Truiden	Al-Rayyan	Undisclosed	
8 January 2020	Isaac Christie-Davies	Liverpool	Cercle Brugge	Loan	
8 January 2020	Rominigue Kouamé	Cercle Brugge	Lille	Loan Return	
8 January 2020	Steven Lewerenz	Virton	Viktoria Köln	Undisclosed	
8 January 2020	Terem Moffi	Riteriai	Kortrijk	Undisclosed	
8 January 2020	Sébastien Pocognoli	Standard Liège	Union SG	Free	
9 January 2020	José Cevallos Enríquez	Lokeren	Emelec	Undisclosed	(Note: Cevallos was on loan from Lokeren to Portimonense during the first half of the 2019-20 season. The loan was terminated early and Cevallos was sold to Emelec.)
9 January 2020	Nicky Beloko	Gent	Fiorentina	Loan Return	
9 January 2020	Renaud Emond	Standard Liège	Nantes	Undisclosed	
9 January 2020	Isaac Kiese Thelin	Anderlecht	Malmö FF	Loan	
9 January 2020	Yuya Kubo	Gent	Cincinnati	Undisclosed	
9 January 2020	Ahmed Mostafa	Gent	Al-Adalah	Loan	(Note: Mostafa was on loan from Gent to Abha Club during the first half of the 2019-20 season. The loan was terminated early and Mostafa was now loaned to Al-Adalah.)
11 January 2020	Yuta Koike	Sint-Truiden	Cerezo Osaka	Undisclosed	(Note: Koike was on loan from Sint-Truiden to Kashima Antlers during the first half of the 2019-20 season. The loan ended and Koike was now sold to Cerezo Osaka.)
14 January 2020	Márton Eppel	Kairat	Cercle Brugge	Free	
14 January 2020	Dieumerci Ndongala	Genk	Kasımpaşa	Loan	
15 January 2020	Luete Ava Dongo	AS Vita	Antwerp	Undisclosed	
15 January 2020	Rodrigo Bassani	Roeselare	Zacatepec	Free	
15 January 2020	Irakli Bugridze	Beerschot	Dinamo Tbilisi	Free	
15 January 2020	Alessandro Cerigioni	Lommel	Dessel Sport	Loan	
15 January 2020	Alexandru Chipciu	Anderlecht	CFR Cluj	Free	
15 January 2020	Anderson Niangbo	Red Bull Salzburg	Gent	Undisclosed	
16 January 2020	Dimitris Chatziisaias	Çaykur Rizespor	Cercle Brugge	Loan	
16 January 2020	Corentin Fiore	Cercle Brugge	Teramo	Undisclosed	
16 January 2020	Eden Shamir	Hapoel Be'er Sheva	Standard Liège	Undisclosed	
17 January 2020	Joris Kayembe	Nantes	Charleroi	Undisclosed	
17 January 2020	Knowledge Musona	Anderlecht	Eupen	Loan	
17 January 2020	Stéphane Oméonga	Cercle Brugge	Genoa	Loan Return	(Note: Oméonga was on loan from Genoa to Cercle Brugge during the first half of the 2019-20 season. The loan was terminated early and Oméonga was loaned out to Hibernian instead.)
17 January 2020	Milan Savić	Mechelen	Čukarički	Free	
17 January 2020	Emmanuel Sowah Adjei	Anderlecht	Eupen	Undisclosed	
17 January 2020	Anthony Vanden Borre	Free Agent	Anderlecht	NA	
18 January 2020	Brendan Schoonbaert	Club Brugge	Deinze	Loan	(Note: Schoonbaert was on loan from Club Brugge to Lommel during the first half of the 2019-20 season. The loan was terminated early and Schoonbaert was loaned out to Deinze instead.)
18 January 2020	George Timotheou	Zulte Waregem	Western United	Loan	
20 January 2020	Soufyan Ahannach	Union SG	Brighton & Hove Albion	Loan Return	(Note: Ahannach was on loan from Brighton & Hove Albion to Union SG during the first half of the 2019-20 season. The loan was terminated early and Ahannach was sold to Go Ahead Eagles instead.)
20 January 2020	Timothy Derijck	Gent	Kortrijk	Undisclosed	
20 January 2020	Gary Kagelmacher	Kortrijk	Peñarol	Undisclosed	
20 January 2020	Lukáš Mareček	Lokeren	Teplice	Undisclosed	
20 January 2020	Nihad Mujakić	Kortrijk	Hajduk Split	Loan	
20 January 2020	Mbwana Samatta	Genk	Aston Villa	Undisclosed	
21 January 2020	Luka Adžić	Anderlecht	Emmen	Loan	
21 January 2020	Uche Henry Agbo	Standard Liège	Deportivo La Coruña	Loan	(Note: Agbo was on loan from Standard Liège to Braga during the first half of the 2019-20 season. The loan was terminated early and Agbo was loaned to Deportivo La Coruña instead.)
21 January 2020	William Balikwisha	Standard Liège	MVV Maastricht	Loan	(Note: Balikwisha was on loan from Standard Liège to Cercle Brugge during the first half of the 2019-20 season. The loan was terminated early and Balikwisha was loaned to MVV Maastricht instead.)
21 January 2020	Natanaël Frenoy	Standard Liège	RFC Liège	Loan	(Note: Frenoy was on loan from Standard Liège to MVV Maastricht during the first half of the 2019-20 season. The loan was terminated early and Frenoy was loaned to RFC Liège instead.)
21 January 2020	Cameron Humphreys	Zulte Waregem	Excelsior	Loan	
21 January 2020	Lennart Moser	Union Berlin	Cercle Brugge	Loan	
21 January 2020	Paul-José M'Poku	Standard Liège	Al Wahda	Undisclosed	
21 January 2020	Rijad Sadiku	Excel Mouscron	Mladost Doboj Kakanj	Undisclosed	
21 January 2020	Mickaël Tirpan	Lokeren	Kasımpaşa	Undisclosed	
22 January 2020	Tristan Borges	Forge FC	OH Leuven	Undisclosed	
23 January 2020	Marwane Benamra	Virton	Givry	Loan	
23 January 2020	Eboue Kouassi	Celtic	Genk	Loan	
24 January 2020	Julien Serrano	Cercle Brugge	Monaco	Loan Return	(Note: Serrano was on loan from Monaco to Cercle Brugge during the first half of the 2019-20 season. The loan was terminated early and Serrano was loaned to Béziers instead.)
24 January 2020	Bassem Srarfi	Nice	Zulte Waregem	Undisclosed	
27 January 2020	Thomas Didillon	Anderlecht	Genk	Loan	
27 January 2020	Rodrigo Fumaça	Roeselare	Macaé	Free	
27 January 2020	Erik Gliha	Sint-Truiden	Triglav	Free	
27 January 2020	Davor Matijaš	Hajduk Split	Antwerp	Undisclosed	
27 January 2020	John Nekadio	Trinité	Standard Liège	Undisclosed	
27 January 2020	Dylan Seys	RKC Waalwijk	Excel Mouscron	Free	
28 January 2020	Barış Alıcı	Fenerbahçe	Westerlo	Loan	
28 January 2020	Bruno Godeau	Excel Mouscron	Gent	Undisclosed	
28 January 2020	Ko Matsubara	Shimizu S-Pulse	Sint-Truiden	Undisclosed	
28 January 2020	Adama Niane	Charleroi	Oostende	Loan	
28 January 2020	Enes Sağlık	Charleroi	Excel Mouscron	Undisclosed	
28 January 2020	Moussa Sissako	Paris Saint-Germain	Standard Liège	Loan	
29 January 2020	Rik De Kuyffer	Lommel	Berchem Sport	Loan	
29 January 2020	Adrián Lapeña	Eupen	Castellón	Undisclosed	
29 January 2020	Jordi Mboula	Cercle Brugge	Monaco	Loan Return	(Note: Mboula was on loan from Monaco to Cercle Brugge during the first half of the 2019-20 season. The loan was terminated early and Mboula was loaned to Huesca instead.)
29 January 2020	Mikael Soisalo	Zulte Waregem	Varzim	Loan	
29 January 2020	Laurens Symons	Lokeren	Mechelen	Undisclosed	
30 January 2020	Sander Berge	Genk	Sheffield United	Undisclosed	
30 January 2020	Trova Boni	Mechelen	Varzim	Loan	
30 January 2020	Emeric Dudouit	Beerschot	Dunkerque	Free	
30 January 2020	Abdelrafik Gérard	Union SG	Gabala	Free	
30 January 2020	Ianis Hagi	Genk	Rangers	Loan	
30 January 2020	Lior Inbrum	Gent	Maccabi Petah Tikva	Loan	(Note: Inbrum was on loan from Gent to Hapoel Tel Aviv during the first half of the 2019-20 season. The loan was terminated early and Inbrum was loaned to Maccabi Petah Tikva instead.)
30 January 2020	Michael Krmenčík	Viktoria Plzeň	Club Brugge	Undisclosed	
30 January 2020	Fran Navarro	Lokeren	Valencia	Loan Return	
30 January 2020	Isaac Nuhu	Aspire Academy Senegal	Eupen	Undisclosed	
30 January 2020	Thomas Nzinga	Lokeren	RWDM47	Loan	
30 January 2020	Simon Paulet	Swansea City	Westerlo	Free	
30 January 2020	Lasse Sobiech	1. FC Köln	Excel Mouscron	Loan	
30 January 2020	Vinni Triboulet	Virton	Nancy	Loan Return	
30 January 2020	Dimitar Velkovski	Slavia Sofia	Cercle Brugge	Undisclosed	
30 January 2020	Jelle Vossen	Club Brugge	Zulte Waregem	Undisclosed	
31 January 2020	Sofyan Amrabat	Club Brugge	Verona	Undisclosed	(Note: Amrabat was on loan from Club Brugge to Verona during the first half of the 2019-20 season. Verona activated a buy clause in the loan deal and immediately sold Amrabat to Fiorentina.)
31 January 2020	Adrian Beck	Union SG	SSV Ulm	Undisclosed	(Note: Beck was on loan from Union SG to Hamilton Academical during the first half of the 2019-20 season. The loan was terminated early and Beck was sold to SSV Ulm.)
31 January 2020	Adrien Bongiovanni	Cercle Brugge	Monaco	Loan Return	(Note: Bongiovanni was on loan from Monaco to Cercle Brugge during the first half of the 2019-20 season. The loan was terminated early and Bongiovanni was loaned to Béziers instead.)
31 January 2020	Charlie Brown	Chelsea	Union SG	Loan	
31 January 2020	Gabriel Canela	Nova Iguaçu	Zulte Waregem	Loan	
31 January 2020	Dion Cools	Club Brugge	Midtjylland	Undisclosed	
31 January 2020	Mathieu De Smet	Zulte Waregem	Deinze	Loan	
31 January 2020	Jean-Luc Dompé	Gent	Zulte Waregem	Undisclosed	
31 January 2020	Hotman El Kababri	Anderlecht	Zulte Waregem	Undisclosed	
31 January 2020	Wout Faes	Reims	Oostende	Loan	(Note: Faes was on sold by Oostende to Reims, with the deal including that Faes would be loaned back out to Oostende until the end of the season.)
31 January 2020	Pape Habib Guèye	Aalesund	Kortrijk	Undisclosed	
31 January 2020	Sam Hendriks	OH Leuven	Cambuur	Loan	
31 January 2020	Samson Iyede	Fremad Amager	Lommel	Loan	
31 January 2020	Dejan Joveljić	Eintracht Frankfurt	Anderlecht	Loan	
31 January 2020	Malick Keita	Charleroi	Francs Borains	Loan	
31 January 2020	Kemar Lawrence	New York Red Bulls	Anderlecht	Undisclosed	
31 January 2020	Jean Thierry Lazare	Eupen	Charleroi	Undisclosed	
31 January 2020	Stallone Limbombe	Gent	OH Leuven	Undisclosed	(Note: Limbombe was on loan from Gent to Giresunspor during the first half of the 2019-20 season. The loan was terminated early and Stallone was sold to OH Leuven instead.)
31 January 2020	Yevhenii Makarenko	Anderlecht	Kortrijk	Loan	
31 January 2020	Guy Mbenza	Stade Tunisien	Cercle Brugge	Undisclosed	
31 January 2020	András Németh	Genk	Lommel	Loan	
31 January 2020	Delio Palmieri	Excel Mouscron	Schiltigheim	Undisclosed	
31 January 2020	Adalberto Peñaranda	Eupen	Watford	Loan Return	
31 January 2020	Marko Pjaca	Juventus	Anderlecht	Loan	
31 January 2020	Smail Prevljak	Red Bull Salzburg	Eupen	Loan	
31 January 2020	Nicolas Rajsel	Oostende	Gabala	Free	
31 January 2020	Alexis Saelemaekers	Anderlecht	Milan	Loan	
31 January 2020	Bubacarr Sanneh	Anderlecht	Oostende	Loan	(Note: Sanneh was on loan from Anderlecht to Göztepe during the first half of the 2019-20 season. The loan was terminated early and Sanneh was loaned to Oostende instead.)
31 January 2020	Vladimir Screciu	Genk	Lommel	Loan	
31 January 2020	Aaron Tshibola	Waasland-Beveren	Aves	Free	
31 January 2020	Jan Van den Bergh	Gent	OH Leuven	Loan	
31 January 2020	Louis Verstraete	Antwerp	Oostende	Loan	(Note: Verstraete was on sold by Gent to Antwerp, after which Antwerp immediately loaned him out to Oostende.)

=== February ===
Date	Name	Moving from	Moving to	Fee	Note
1 February 2020	Filip Bojić	Virton	Released	Free Agent	
1 February 2020	Felipe Micael	Mirassol	Beerschot	Undisclosed	
1 February 2020	Yunusa Owolabi Muritala	Göztepe	Westerlo	Undisclosed	
1 February 2020	Basilio Ndong	Shkupi	Westerlo	Undisclosed	
1 February 2020	Laurens Vermijl	Lommel	Tessenderlo	Loan	
3 February 2020	Tyron Ivanof	Kortrijk	RWDM47	Undisclosed	
4 February 2020	Renan Areias	Roeselare	Ashdod	Loan	
5 February 2020	Yohan Croizet	Free Agent	OH Leuven	NA	
5 February 2020	Ivan Fiolić	Genk	Cracovia	Loan	(Note: Fiolić was on loan from Genk to AEK Larnaca during the first half of the 2019-20 season. The loan was terminated early and Fiolić was loaned to Cracovia instead.)
6 February 2020	Elton Acolatse	Sint-Truiden	Hapoel Be'er Sheva	Loan	
6 February 2020	Warleson	Free Agent	Cercle Brugge	NA	
7 February 2020	Ousseynou Diagne	Club Brugge	Kristiansund	Undisclosed	
8 February 2020	Kawin Thamsatchanan	OH Leuven	Hokkaido Consadole Sapporo	Loan	
12 February 2020	Loïc Badiashile	Cercle Brugge	Monaco	Loan Return	(Note: badiashile was on loan from Monaco to Cercle Brugge during the first half of the 2019-20 season. The loan was terminated early and Badiashile was loaned to Amiens instead.)
12 February 2020	Marco Bürki	Zulte Waregem	Luzern	Undisclosed	
13 February 2020	Kenny Saief	Anderlecht	Lechia Gdańsk	Loan	
14 February 2020	Fredrik Oldrup Jensen	Zulte Waregem	Vålerenga	Undisclosed	(Note: Jensen was on loan from Zulte Waregem to Odd during 2019. The loan ended and Jensen was now loaned to Vålerenga.)
18 February 2020	Habib Habibou	Lokeren	Politehnica Iași	Free	
19 February 2020	Luka Zarandia	Zulte Waregem	Tobol	Loan	
20 February 2020	Parfait Mandanda	Charleroi	Hartford Athletic	Loan	
20 February 2020	Urho Nissilä	MVV	Zulte Waregem	Loan Return	
20 February 2020	Rafał Pietrzak	Excel Mouscron	Lechia Gdańsk	Undisclosed	
22 February 2020	Emmanuel Banda	Oostende	Djurgårdens IF	Free	

== Sorted by team ==
=== Belgian First Division A teams ===
==== Anderlecht ====
In:

No.	Pos.	Nation	Player
—	FW	SRB	Dejan Joveljić (on loan from Eintracht Frankfurt)
—	DF	JAM	Kemar Lawrence (from New York Red Bulls)
—	DF	PAN	Michael Amir Murillo (from New York Red Bulls)
—	FW	CRO	Marko Pjaca (on loan from Juventus)
—	MF	BEL	Anthony Vanden Borre (free agent)

Out:

No.	Pos.	Nation	Player
5	DF	UKR	Yevhenii Makarenko (on loan to Kortrijk)
6	MF	ROU	Alexandru Chipciu (to CFR Cluj)
11	FW	ZIM	Knowledge Musona (on loan to Eupen)
15	MF	USA	Kenny Saief (on loan to Lechia Gdańsk)
16	GK	FRA	Thomas Didillon (on loan to Genk)
17	MF	SRB	Luka Adžić (on loan to Emmen)
24	FW	SWE	Isaac Kiese Thelin (on loan to Malmö FF)
41	DF	GHA	Emmanuel Sowah Adjei (to Eupen)
56	MF	BEL	Alexis Saelemaekers (on loan to Milan)
—	DF	MAR	Hotman El Kababri (to Zulte Waregem)
—	DF	GAM	Bubacarr Sanneh (loan return from Göztepe, then loaned to Oostende)

==== Antwerp ====
In:

No.	Pos.	Nation	Player
—	DF	COD	Luete Ava Dongo (from AS Vita)
—	GK	CRO	Davor Matijaš (from Hajduk Split)

Out:

No.	Pos.	Nation	Player
—	MF	TUN	Nader Ghandri (to Westerlo)
—	MF	BEL	Louis Verstraete (signed from Gent, then loaned to Oostende)

==== Cercle Brugge ====
In:

No.	Pos.	Nation	Player
—	DF	GRE	Dimitris Chatziisaias (on loan from Çaykur Rizespor)
—	MF	WAL	Isaac Christie-Davies (on loan from Liverpool)
—	FW	HUN	Márton Eppel (from Kairat)
—	FW	BIH	Dino Hotić (from Maribor)
—	FW	CGO	Guy Mbenza (from Stade Tunisien)
—	GK	GER	Lennart Moser (on loan from Union Berlin)
—	DF	BUL	Dimitar Velkovski (from Slavia Sofia)
—	GK	BRA	Warleson (free agent)

Out:

No.	Pos.	Nation	Player
3	DF	FRA	Julien Serrano (loan return to Monaco)
10	MF	BEL	Adrien Bongiovanni (loan return to Monaco)
17	MF	ESP	Jordi Mboula (loan return to Monaco)
19	MF	MLI	Rominigue Kouamé (loan return to Lille)
21	MF	BEL	Stéphane Oméonga (loan return to Genoa)
23	MF	COD	William Balikwisha (loan return to Standard Liège)
24	DF	BEL	Corentin Fiore (to Teramo)
40	GK	FRA	Loïc Badiashile (loan return to Monaco)

==== Charleroi ====
In:

No.	Pos.	Nation	Player
—	MF	BEL	Joris Kayembe (from Nantes)
—	MF	CIV	Jean Thierry Lazare (from Eupen)

Out:

No.	Pos.	Nation	Player
9	FW	MLI	Adama Niane (on loan to Oostende)
21	MF	BEL	Enes Sağlık (to Excel Mouscron)
35	GK	COD	Parfait Mandanda (on loan to Hartford Athletic)
—	MF	GUI	Malick Keita (on loan to Francs Borains)

==== Club Brugge ====
In:

No.	Pos.	Nation	Player
—	FW	SEN	Youssouph Badji (from Casa Sports)
—	FW	CZE	Michael Krmenčík (from Viktoria Plzeň)

Out:

No.	Pos.	Nation	Player
7	FW	SEN	Amadou Sagna (on loan to Oostende)
9	FW	BEL	Jelle Vossen (to Zulte Waregem)
21	DF	BEL	Dion Cools (to Midtjylland)
—	MF	MAR	Sofyan Amrabat (was on loan to Verona, now sold)
—	DF	SEN	Ousseynou Diagne (to Kristiansund)
—	DF	BEL	Brendan Schoonbaert (was on loan to Lommel, now loaned to Deinze)

==== Eupen ====
In:

No.	Pos.	Nation	Player
—	FW	ZIM	Knowledge Musona (on loan from Anderlecht)
—	MF	GHA	Isaac Nuhu (from Aspire Academy Senegal)
—	FW	BIH	Smail Prevljak (on loan from Red Bull Salzburg)
—	DF	GHA	Emmanuel Sowah Adjei (from Anderlecht)

Out:

No.	Pos.	Nation	Player
6	MF	GAM	Sulayman Marreh (to Gent)
7	FW	VEN	Adalberto Peñaranda (loan return to Watford)
8	DF	ESP	Adrián Lapeña (to Castellón)
10	MF	CIV	Jean Thierry Lazare (to Charleroi)
20	FW	JPN	Yuta Toyokawa (to Cerezo Osaka)

==== Excel Mouscron ====
In:

No.	Pos.	Nation	Player
—	MF	BEL	Enes Sağlık (from Charleroi)
—	MF	BEL	Dylan Seys (from RKC Waalwijk)
—	DF	GER	Lasse Sobiech (on loan from 1. FC Köln)

Out:

No.	Pos.	Nation	Player
5	DF	BIH	Rijad Sadiku (to Mladost Doboj Kakanj)
8	MF	ALB	Sebastjan Spahiu (released)
16	GK	BEL	Clément Libertiaux (on loan to La Louvière)
21	MF	FRA	Delio Palmieri (to Schiltigheim)
25	MF	POL	Rafał Pietrzak (to Lechia Gdańsk)
31	DF	BEL	Bruno Godeau (to Gent)

==== Genk ====
In:

No.	Pos.	Nation	Player
—	GK	FRA	Thomas Didillon (on loan from Anderlecht)
—	MF	CIV	Eboue Kouassi (on loan from Celtic)
—	MF	NOR	Mats Møller Dæhli (from St. Pauli)
—	MF	NOR	Kristian Thorstvedt (from Viking)

Out:

No.	Pos.	Nation	Player
10	FW	TAN	Mbwana Samatta (to Aston Villa)
19	MF	POL	Jakub Piotrowski (on loan to Waasland-Beveren)
23	MF	ROU	Ianis Hagi (on loan to Rangers)
25	MF	NOR	Sander Berge (to Sheffield United)
54	MF	ROU	Vladimir Screciu (on loan to Lommel)
77	MF	COD	Dieumerci Ndongala (on loan to Kasımpaşa)
—	MF	CRO	Ivan Fiolić (was on loan to AEK Larnaca, now loaned to Cracovia)
—	FW	HUN	András Németh (on loan to Lommel)

==== Gent ====
In:

No.	Pos.	Nation	Player
—	DF	BEL	Bruno Godeau (from Excel Mouscron)
—	MF	GAM	Sulayman Marreh (from Eupen)
—	MF	CIV	Anderson Niangbo (from Red Bull Salzburg)
—	MF	SWE	Eric Smith (loan return from Tromsø)

Out:

No.	Pos.	Nation	Player
2	DF	BEL	Jan Van den Bergh (on loan to OH Leuven)
3	DF	SUI	Nicky Beloko (loan return to Fiorentina)
11	MF	FRA	Jean-Luc Dompé (to Zulte Waregem)
28	DF	TUN	Dylan Bronn (to Metz)
31	FW	JPN	Yuya Kubo (to Cincinnati)
33	MF	BEL	Louis Verstraete (to Antwerp)
76	DF	BEL	Timothy Derijck (to Kortrijk)
—	MF	ISR	Lior Inbrum (was on loan to Hapoel Tel Aviv, now loaned to Maccabi Petah Tikva)
—	FW	BEL	Stallone Limbombe (was on loan to Giresunspor, now sold to OH Leuven)
—	MF	EGY	Ahmed Mostafa (was on loan to Abha Club, now loaned to Al-Adalah)
—	FW	SEN	Mamadou Sylla (on loan to Orenburg)

==== Kortrijk ====
In:

No.	Pos.	Nation	Player
—	DF	BEL	Timothy Derijck (from Gent)
—	FW	SEN	Pape Habib Guèye (from Aalesund)
—	DF	UKR	Yevhenii Makarenko (on loan from Anderlecht)
—	FW	NGA	Terem Moffi (from Riteriai)

Out:

No.	Pos.	Nation	Player
4	MF	URU	Gary Kagelmacher (to Peñarol)
18	MF	BIH	Nihad Mujakić (on loan to Hajduk Split)
19	MF	BEL	Tyron Ivanof (to RWDM47)
—	MF	CIV	Jean Marco Toualy (to Almería B)

==== Mechelen ====
In:

No.	Pos.	Nation	Player
—	FW	BEL	Laurens Symons (from Lokeren)

Out:

No.	Pos.	Nation	Player
17	MF	BFA	Trova Boni (on loan to Varzim)
19	DF	BEL	Alec Van Hoorenbeeck (on loan to Heist)
—	FW	BIH	Milan Savić (to Čukarički)
—	MF	BEL	Arno Van Keilegom (on loan to Heist)

==== Oostende ====
In:

No.	Pos.	Nation	Player
—	DF	BEL	Wout Faes (was sold to Reims, but immediately loaned back)
—	FW	MLI	Adama Niane (on loan from Charleroi)
—	FW	SEN	Amadou Sagna (on loan from Club Brugge)
—	DF	GAM	Bubacarr Sanneh (on loan from Anderlecht)
—	MF	BEL	Louis Verstraete (on loan from Antwerp)

Out:

No.	Pos.	Nation	Player
12	MF	ZAM	Emmanuel Banda (to Djurgårdens IF)
32	FW	SVN	Nicolas Rajsel (to Gabala)
55	MF	BRA	Fernando Canesin (to Athletico Paranaense)

==== Sint-Truiden ====
In:

No.	Pos.	Nation	Player
—	DF	BEL	Rocky Bushiri (on loan from Norwich City)
—	FW	SLE	Mohamed Buya Turay (loan return from Djurgårdens IF)
—	DF	JPN	Ko Matsubara (from Shimizu S-Pulse)

Out:

No.	Pos.	Nation	Player
11	FW	CIV	Yohan Boli (to Al-Rayyan)
15	FW	VIE	Nguyễn Công Phượng (loan return to Hoàng Anh Gia Lai)
29	MF	NED	Elton Acolatse (on loan to Hapoel Be'er Sheva)
—	DF	SVN	Erik Gliha (to Triglav)
—	DF	JPN	Yuta Koike (was on loan to Kashima Antlers, now sold to Cerezo Osaka)

==== Standard Liège ====
In:

No.	Pos.	Nation	Player
—	DF	COD	John Nekadio (from Trinité)
—	MF	ISR	Eden Shamir (from Hapoel Be'er Sheva)
—	DF	MLI	Moussa Sissako (on loan from Paris Saint-Germain)

Out:

No.	Pos.	Nation	Player
2	DF	HAI	Réginal Goreux (retired)
9	DF	BEL	Renaud Emond (to Nantes)
14	MF	BEL	Anthony Limbombe (loan return to Nantes)
15	DF	BEL	Sébastien Pocognoli (to Union SG)
40	MF	COD	Paul-José M'Poku (to Al Wahda)
—	MF	NGA	Uche Henry Agbo (was on loan to Braga, now loaned to Deportivo La Coruña)
—	MF	COD	William Balikwisha (was on loan to Cercle Brugge, now loaned to MVV Maastricht)
—	DF	BEL	Natanaël Frenoy (was on loan to MVV Maastricht, now loaned to RFC Liège)

==== Waasland-Beveren ====
In:

No.	Pos.	Nation	Player
—	MF	POL	Jakub Piotrowski (on loan from Genk)

Out:

No.	Pos.	Nation	Player
6	MF	COD	Aaron Tshibola (to Aves)
9	FW	GRE	Fiorin Durmishaj (loan return to Olympiacos)

==== Zulte-Waregem ====
In:

No.	Pos.	Nation	Player
—	MF	BRA	Gabriel Canela (on loan from Nova Iguaçu)
—	MF	FRA	Jean-Luc Dompé (from Gent)
—	DF	MAR	Hotman El Kababri (from Anderlecht)
—	MF	FIN	Urho Nissilä (loan return from MVV)
—	MF	TUN	Bassem Srarfi (from Nice)
—	FW	BEL	Jelle Vossen (from Club Brugge)

Out:

No.	Pos.	Nation	Player
7	MF	GEO	Luka Zarandia (on loan to Tobol)
12	DF	AUS	George Timotheou (on loan to Western United)
17	MF	FIN	Mikael Soisalo (on loan to Varzim)
23	DF	SUI	Marco Bürki (to Luzern)
29	FW	BEL	Mathieu De Smet (on loan to Deinze)
33	DF	ENG	Cameron Humphreys (on loan to Excelsior)
—	MF	NOR	Fredrik Oldrup Jensen (was on loan to Odd, now sold to Vålerenga)

=== Belgian First Division B teams ===
==== Beerschot ====
In:

No.	Pos.	Nation	Player
—	DF	FRA	Baptiste Aloé (from Valenciennes)
—	DF	BEL	Frédéric Frans (from Lierse Kempenzonen)
—	FW	BRA	Felipe Micael (from Mirassol)

Out:

No.	Pos.	Nation	Player
2	DF	FRA	Emeric Dudouit (to Dunkerque)
22	MF	GEO	Irakli Bugridze (to Dinamo Tbilisi)

==== Lokeren ====
In:

No.	Pos.	Nation	Player

Out:

No.	Pos.	Nation	Player
9	FW	BEL	Laurens Symons (to Mechelen)
10	FW	CTA	Habib Habibou (to Politehnica Iași)
11	FW	ESP	Fran Navarro (loan return to Valencia)
18	FW	BEL	Thomas Nzinga (on loan to RWDM47)
23	DF	CZE	Lukáš Mareček (to Teplice)
25	DF	BEL	Mickaël Tirpan (to Kasımpaşa)
—	MF	ECU	José Cevallos Enríquez (was on loan to Portimonense, now sold to Emelec)

==== Lommel ====
In:

No.	Pos.	Nation	Player
—	FW	GAM	Pa Omar Babou (on loan from Superstars Academy)
—	FW	NGA	Samson Iyede (on loan from Fremad Amager)
—	FW	HUN	András Németh (on loan from Genk)
—	MF	LUX	Chris Philipps (from Legia Warsaw)
—	MF	ROU	Vladimir Screciu (on loan from Genk)

Out:

No.	Pos.	Nation	Player
4	DF	BEL	Ben Santermans (on loan to Lierse Kempenzonen)
5	DF	BEL	Brendan Schoonbaert (loan return to Club Brugge)
11	MF	BEL	Laurens Vermijl (on loan to Tessenderlo)
21	FW	BEL	Alessandro Cerigioni (on loan to Dessel Sport)
66	FW	BEL	Rik De Kuyffer (on loan to Berchem Sport)

==== OH Leuven ====
In:

No.	Pos.	Nation	Player
—	MF	CAN	Tristan Borges (from Forge FC)
—	MF	FRA	Yohan Croizet (free agent)
—	FW	BEL	Stallone Limbombe (from Gent)
—	DF	BEL	Jan Van den Bergh (on loan from Gent)

Out:

No.	Pos.	Nation	Player
1	GK	THA	Kawin Thamsatchanan (on loan to Hokkaido Consadole Sapporo)
—	FW	NED	Sam Hendriks (on loan to Cambuur)

==== Roeselare ====
In:

No.	Pos.	Nation	Player

Out:

No.	Pos.	Nation	Player
8	MF	BRA	Renan Areias (on loan to Ashdod)
22	MF	BRA	Alyson Santos Silva (to Confiança)
29	MF	BRA	Rodrigo Bassani (to Zacatepec)
30	FW	BRA	Rodrigo Fumaça (to Macaé)
—	MF	BIH	Sanjin Lelić (released)

==== Union SG ====
In:

No.	Pos.	Nation	Player
—	FW	ENG	Charlie Brown (on loan from Chelsea)
—	DF	BEL	Sébastien Pocognoli (from Standard Liège)
—	MF	ISL	Aron Sigurðarson (from Start)

Out:

No.	Pos.	Nation	Player
20	MF	FRA	Abdelrafik Gérard (to Gabala)
34	MF	NED	Soufyan Ahannach (loan return to Brighton & Hove Albion)
—	MF	GER	Adrian Beck (was on loan to Hamilton Academical, now sold to SSV Ulm)

==== Virton ====
In:

No.	Pos.	Nation	Player

Out:

No.	Pos.	Nation	Player
9	MF	GER	Steven Lewerenz (to Viktoria Köln)
17	MF	FRA	Vinni Triboulet (loan return to Nancy)
29	MF	ALG	Marwane Benamra (on loan to Givry)
—	MF	CRO	Filip Bojić (released)

==== Westerlo ====
In:

No.	Pos.	Nation	Player
—	MF	TUR	Barış Alıcı (on loan from Fenerbahçe)
—	MF	TUN	Nader Ghandri (from Antwerp)
—	FW	NGA	Yunusa Owolabi Muritala (from Göztepe)
—	DF	EQG	Basilio Ndong (from Shkupi)
—	MF	BEL	Simon Paulet (from Swansea City)

Out:

No.	Pos.	Nation	Player
