= 2019–20 KAS Eupen season =

KAS Eupen
2019–20 season
- Owner: ASPIRE Zone Foundation
- Chairman: Dieter Steffens
- Manager: Beñat San José
- Stadium: Kehrwegstadion
- First Division A: 13th
- Belgian Cup: Seventh round

The 2019–20 KAS Eupen season was the club's 75th season in existence and the 4th consecutive season in the top flight of Belgian football. In addition to the domestic league, Eupen participated in this season's edition of the Belgian Cup.

== Players ==
As of 30 January 2020

Note: Flags indicate national team as defined under FIFA eligibility rules; some limited exceptions apply. Players may hold more than one non-FIFA nationality.

No.	Pos.	Nation	Player
1	GK	BEL	Ortwin De Wolf
3	DF	NED	Menno Koch
5	DF	ESP	Jordi Amat (loan from Rayo Vallecano)
7	FW	BIH	Smail Prevljak (loan from RB Salzburg)
9	FW	ARG	Flavio Ciampichetti
11	MF	BEL	Mégan Laurent
13	MF	MLI	Sibiry Keita
14	MF	JAM	Tyreek Magee
15	MF	BEL	Garry Magnée
16	MF	IRN	Omid Ebrahimi (loan from Al Ahli)
17	FW	GNB	Carlos Embaló
18	MF	BEL	Nils Schouterden
19	FW	COD	Jonathan Bolingi (loan from Royal Antwerp)
20	FW	ZIM	Knowledge Musona (loan from Anderlecht)

No.	Pos.	Nation	Player
21	FW	ESP	Jon Bautista (loan from Real Sociedad)
22	DF	BEL	Siebe Blondelle
23	DF	BEN	Olivier Verdon (loan from Alavés)
24	DF	CIV	Silas Gnaka
25	DF	GHA	Emmanuel Sowah Adjei
26	MF	BEL	Jens Cools
28	MF	CMR	Pierre Akono
30	GK	BEL	Romain Matthys
32	DF	GER	Andreas Beck
33	GK	GHA	Abdul Nurudeen
34	MF	CIV	Konan N'Dri
35	DF	BEL	Boris Lambert
66	MF	IRN	Saeid Ezatolahi (loan from Rostov)
77	MF	BIH	Danijel Milićević
97	FW	POR	Leonardo Rocha

== Pre-season and friendlies ==
Win Draw Loss

13 July 2019 Friendly	Bayer Leverkusen (Germany)	3–4	(Belgium) Eupen	Cologne, Germany
18:30 CEST (UTC+2)	Paulinho 7'; Laurent 11' (o.g.); Azhil 33'		Ciampichetti 42', 45'; Laurent 65'; Fünger 85' (o.g.)	Stadium: Jugendleistungszentrum Kurtekotten; Attendance: 1,000

9 January 2020 Friendly	Ajax (Netherlands)	2–0	(Belgium) Eupen	Al Wakrah, Qatar
19:00 AST (UTC+3)	De Jong 20'; Traoré 33'			Stadium: Al Janoub Stadium

11 January 2020 Friendly	Eupen (Belgium)	2–1	(Netherlands) PSV Eindhoven	Doha, Qatar
14:35 AST (UTC+3)	Milićević 24'; Ciampichetti 59'		Bruma 34'; Madueke (yellow card) 81'	Stadium: ASPIRE Dome Hall 1

== Competitions ==
=== Overall record ===
Competition	First match	Last match	Starting round	Final position	Record							
Competition	First match	Last match	Starting round	Final position	Pld	W	D	L	GF	GA	GD	Win %
First Division A	28 July 2019	7 March 2020	Matchday 1	13th	29	8	6	15	28	51	−23	27.59
Belgian Cup	25 September 2019	4 December 2019	Sixth round	Seventh round	2	0	1	1	1	2	−1	0.00
Total					31	8	7	16	29	53	−24	25.81

Source: Competitions

=== First Division A ===
==== League table ====
Pos	Team	Pld	W	D	L	GF	GA	GD	Pts
11	Kortrijk	29	9	6	14	40	44	−4	33
12	Sint-Truiden	29	9	6	14	36	53	−17	33
13	Eupen	29	8	6	15	28	51	−23	30
14	Cercle Brugge	29	7	2	20	27	54	−27	23
15	Oostende	29	6	4	19	29	58	−29	22

Source: Belgian First Division A (in Dutch), Soccerway
Rules for classification: 1) Points; 2) Matches won; 3) Goal difference; 4) Goals scored; 5) Away goals scored; 6) Away matches won; 7) Play-off.

==== Results by round ====
Round	1
Ground	
Result	
Position	

Source: Jupiler Pro League
A = Away; H = Home; W = Win; D = Draw; L = Loss

==== Matches ====
On 2 April 2020, the Jupiler Pro League's board of directors proposed to cancel the season due to the COVID-19 pandemic. The General Assembly accepted the proposal on 15 May, and officially ended the 2019–20 season.

28 July 2019 1	Eupen	1–4	Antwerp	Eupen
18:00 CEST (UTC+2)				Stadium: Kehrwegstadion

4 August 2019 2	Gent	6–1	Eupen	Ghent
14:30 CEST (UTC+2)	Plastun 2'; Ngadeu-Ngadjui 9'; Bezus 33', 90'; Yaremchuk 41'; David 90+2'	Report	Blondelle (yellow card) 39', (goal) 63'; Amat (yellow card) 60'	Stadium: Ghelamco Arena; Attendance: 17,780; Referee: Lawrence Visser

10 August 2019 3	Eupen	1–1	Waasland-Beveren	Eupen
20:00 CEST (UTC+2)				Stadium: Kehrwegstadion; Referee: Jasper Vergoote

16 August 2019 4	Club Brugge	0–0	Eupen	Bruges
20:30 CEST (UTC+2)	Mata (yellow card) 82'; Vanaken (yellow card) 90+4'; Vormer (yellow card) 90+4'	Report	Koch (yellow card) 29'; Gnaka (yellow card) 57'; Toyokawa (yellow card) 59'; Rocha (yellow card) 89'	Stadium: Jan Breydel Stadium; Attendance: 27,000; Referee: Bram Van Driessche

25 August 2019 5	Excel Mouscron	2–0	Eupen	Mouscron
20:00 CEST (UTC+2)				Stadium: Stade Le Canonnier; Referee: Wesley Alen

31 August 2019 6	Eupen	0–2	Sint-Truiden	Eupen
18:00 CEST (UTC+2)				Stadium: Kehrwegstadion; Referee: Kevin Van Damme

14 September 2019 7	Eupen	1–1	Zulte Waregem	Eupen
20:00 CEST (UTC+2)	Bautista 64'		Pletinckx (red card) 42'; Larin 45+4'	Stadium: Kehrwegstadion; Referee: Alexandre Boucaut

22 September 2019 8	Standard Liège	3–0	Eupen	Liège
14:30 CEST (UTC+2)	Laifis 6'; Boljević 27', 61'	Report	Amat (yellow card) 37' (yellow-red card) 83'; Beck (yellow card) 65'; Bolingi (yellow card) 83'	Stadium: Stade Maurice Dufrasne; Attendance: 25,204; Referee: Wesley Alen

28 September 2019 9	Cercle Brugge	1–2	Eupen	Bruges
20:00 CEST (UTC+2)	Peeters 12' (pen.); Panzo (yellow card) 90' (yellow-red card) 90+4'		Milićević 76', 88'	Stadium: Jan Breydel Stadium; Referee: Wesli De Cremer

2 November 2019 14	Eupen	2–0	Genk	Eupen
18:00 CET (UTC+1)	Bolingi 20'; Amat 23'	Report	Wouters (yellow card) 22'	Stadium: Kehrwegstadion; Referee: Wesli De Cremer

9 November 2019 15	Charleroi	1–0	Eupen	Charleroi
18:00 CET (UTC+1)				Stadium: Stade du Pays de Charleroi

23 November 2019 16	Eupen	1–2	Standard Liège	Eupen
18:00 CET (UTC+1)	Cools (yellow card) 12'; Verdon (yellow card) 45'; Schouterden 57'; Bolingi 80'	Report	M'Poku 14'; Bastien 90+3'	Stadium: Kehrwegstadion; Attendance: 7,463; Referee: Christof Dierick

30 November 2019 17	Zulte Waregem	1–0	Eupen	Waregem
20:00 CET (UTC+1)	Bruno 23'			Stadium: Regenboogstadion; Referee: Bert Put

14 December 2019 19	Antwerp	1–0	Eupen	Antwerp
18:00 CET (UTC+1)				Stadium: Bosuilstadion

26 December 2019 21	Genk	2–1	Eupen	Genk
14:30 CET (UTC+1)	Ito 12'; Dewaest (yellow card) 37'; Onuachu 60'	Report	Koch (yellow card) 5'; Lazare 63', (yellow card) 81'; Embaló (yellow card) 90+1'	Stadium: Luminus Arena; Attendance: 24,956; Referee: Lothar D'hondt

18 January 2020 22	Eupen	1–1	Charleroi	Eupen
18:00 CET (UTC+1)				Stadium: Kehrwegstadion; Referee: Wim Smet

25 January 2020 23	Waasland-Beveren	0–1	Eupen	Beveren
20:00 CET (UTC+1)				Stadium: Freethiel Stadion; Referee: Frederik Geldhof

1 February 2020 24	Eupen	1–0	Cercle Brugge	Eupen
20:00 CET (UTC+1)	Beck 24'		Hoggas (penalty missed) 89'	Stadium: Kehrwegstadion; Referee: Wesley Alen

8 February 2020 25	Sint-Truiden	5–2	Eupen	Sint-Truiden
20:00 CET (UTC+1)				Stadium: Stayen; Referee: Christof Dierick

14 February 2020 26	Eupen	2–3	Gent	Eupen
20:30 CET (UTC+1)	Prevljak 7'; Milićević 19'; Musona (yellow card) 75'; Ebrahimi (yellow card) 76'; Amat (yellow card) 90+1'	Report	David 5', 12'; Castro-Montes 84'; Odjidja-Ofoe (yellow card) 85'	Stadium: Kehrwegstadion; Referee: Jonathan Lardot

29 February 2020 28	Eupen	2–1	Excel Mouscron	Eupen
20:00 CET (UTC+1)				Stadium: Kehrwegstadion; Referee: Wesli De Cremer

7 March 2020 29	Mechelen	1–1	Eupen	Mechelen
20:00 CET (UTC+1)				Stadium: Achter de Kazerne; Referee: Jasper Vergoote

15 March 2020 30	Eupen	Cancelled	Club Brugge	Eupen
18:00 CET (UTC+1)				Stadium: Kehrwegstadion
Note: The match was cancelled due to the COVID-19 pandemic.

=== Belgian Cup ===
25 September 2019 Sixth round	Cappellen	0–0 (a.e.t.) (3-5 p)	Eupen	Kapellen
20:00 CEST (UTC+2)		report		Stadium: Stadion Jos Van Wellen
	Penalties
	R. Kil (penalty scored); S. Kil (penalty scored); Walen De Keyser (penalty scored); Van Kerckhoven (penalty missed)		(penalty scored) Ciampichetti; (penalty scored) Milićević; (penalty scored) Verdon; (penalty scored) Schouterden; (penalty scored) Rocha

4 December 2019 Seventh round	Kortrijk	2–1	Eupen	Kortrijk
20:00 CET (UTC+1)	Mboyo 68' (pen.); Ezatolahi 70' (o.g.)	report	Marreh 15'	Stadium: Guldensporen Stadion
