= 2019–20 Belgian Cup =

Tournament details
- Country: Belgium
- Dates: 26 July 2019 – 1 August 2020

Final positions
- Champions: Antwerp
- Runners-up: Club Brugge

The 2019–20 Belgian Cup, called the Croky Cup for sponsorship reasons, was the 65th season of Belgium's annual football cup competition. The competition began on 26 July 2019 and ended with the final on 1 August 2020. The winners of the competition qualified for the 2020–21 UEFA Europa League Group Stage. KV Mechelen were the defending champions, but were unable to defend their title as the club got banned from the competition for one season after being found guilty of match-fixing as part of the 2017–19 Belgian football fraud scandal.

== Competition format ==
The competition consisted of ten rounds. Except for the semi-finals, all rounds were single-match elimination rounds. When tied after 90 minutes in the first three rounds, penalties were taken immediately. In rounds four to seven and the quarterfinals, when tied after 90 minutes first an extra time period of 30 minutes were played, then penalties were taken if still necessary. The semi-finals were played over two legs, where the team winning on aggregate advanced. The final was played as a single match.

Teams entered the competition in different rounds, based upon their 2019–20 league affiliation. Teams from the fifth-level Belgian Third Amateur Division or lower began in round 1. Belgian Second Amateur Division teams entered in round 2, Belgian First Amateur Division teams entered in round 3, Belgian First Division B teams in round 5 and finally the Belgian First Division A teams entered in round 6. With KV Mechelen being banned from the competition, one of the Belgian First Division B teams (Union SG) was drawn randomly to receive a bye in round 5 and progressed automatically to round 6.

Round	Clubs remaining	Clubs involved	Winners from previous round	New entries this round	Leagues entering at this round
Round 1	311	224	none	224	Belgian Third Amateur Division and Belgian Provincial Leagues
Round 2	199	160	112	48	Belgian Second Amateur Division
Round 3	119	96	80	16	Belgian First Amateur Division
Round 4	73	50	46 + 4 byes	none	none
Round 5	48	32	25	7	Belgian First Division B
Round 6	32	32	16	16	Belgian First Division A (except KV Mechelen) + Union SG
Round 7	16	16	16	none	none
Quarter-Finals	8	8	8	none	none
Semi-Finals	4	4	4	none	none
Final	2	2	2	none	none

== Round and draw dates ==
Round	Draw date	Match date
First Round	29 June 2019	26, 27 and 28 July 2019
Second Round	29 June 2019	3 and 4 August 2019
Third Round	29 June 2019	10 and 11 August 2019
Fourth Round	29 June 2019	17 and 18 August 2019
Fifth Round	29 June 2019	23, 24 and 25 August 2019
Sixth Round	26 August 2019	24, 25 and 26 September 2019
Seventh Round	26 September 2019	3, 4 and 5 December 2019
Quarter-finals	5 December 2019	17, 18 and 19 December 2019
Semi-finals	19 December 2019	Leg 1: 22 and 23 January 2020; Leg 2: 5 and 6 February 2020
Final		1 August 2020

== First round ==
This round of matches were played on 27, 28 & 29 July 2019 and included teams playing in the Belgian Third Amateur Division and Belgian Provincial Leagues. Teams from the Belgian Third Amateur Division were seeded and could not play each other.

Tie	Home team (tier)	Score	Away team (tier)
1	Chaumont (6)	0–0 (2–4 p)	Oppagne-Wéris (5)
2	Ster-Francorchamps (6)	2–1	Florenville (6)
3	Libramont (6)	2-1	Mormont (5)
4	Rochefort (5)	4–3	Vyle-Tharoul (7)
5	Malmundaria (6)	2–2 (2–4 p)	Ethe Belmont (6)
6	Libin (7)	0–4	Ciney (5)
7	Bercheux (7)	3–6	Rocherath (7)
8	Templiers-Nandrin (7)	1–1 (3–0 p)	Loyers (6)
9	Vaux (6)	2–3	Saint-Louis-Saint-Léger (6)
10	Nassogne (6)	0–3	Sprimont (5)
11	Butgenbach (8)	1–4	Habay-La-Neuve (5)
12	Mormont B (7)	1–3	Andennais (6)
13	Meix-devant-Virton (5)	4–0	La Roche (6)
14	Aywaille (5)	17–0	Muno (8)
15	United Richelle (5)	6–1	De Goé (8)
16	Horion (9)	2–7	UCE Liège (6)
17	Faimes (7)	5–1	Eghezée (8)
18	Heur-Tongeren (5)	15-0	MCS Liège (7)
19	Huy (5)	1–1 (3–4 p)	Grand-Leez (6)
20	Vliermaal (8)	0–0 (4–5 p)	Daring Huvo Jeuk (7)
21	Taviers (8)	0–4	Bilzen (5)
22	Jodoigne (5)	5–1	Elsaute (7)
23	Oupeye (7)	0–0 (5–3 p)	Warnant (5)
24	Wellen (5)	4–0	FC Eupen 1963 (7)
25	Herstal (5)	6–2	Herderen-Millen (7)
26	Wallonia Walhain (5)	FF 0–5	Alken (6)
27	Raeren-Eynatten (5)	2–1	Wanze/Bas-Oha (6)
28	Aische (5)	4–1	Jehay (7)
29	Helson Helchteren (5)	5–1	Opglabbeek (8)
30	Houtvenne (5)	4–2	Berg en Dal (6)
31	De Kempen (6)	1–1 (4–2 p)	Beringen (5)
32	Betekom (5)	8–1	Geetbets (8)
33	Torpedo Hasselt (7)	0–2	Termien (5)
34	Schriek (7)	1–1 (2–4 p)	Kesselt (8)
35	Turnhout (5)	5–1	Herk-de-Stad (6)
36	Koersel (6)	6–2	Houtem-Oplinter (7)
37	Heusden-Zolder (7)	6–1	Breugel (8)
38	Bokrijk (8)	1–3	Stevoort (8)
39	Witgoor (5)	6–1	Koersel (6)
40	Leopoldsburg (6)	0–1	Esperanza Pelt (5)
41	Lille (6)	3–0	Elen (7)
42	Linden (5)	2–0	Park Houthalen (6)
43	Tervuren-Duisburg (6)	1–1 (6–5 p)	Bertem-Leefdaal (6)
44	Pont-à-Celles-Buzet (5)	1–2	Etterbeek (6)
45	Villers la Ville (6)	3–1	Molignée (6)
46	Wépion (6)	0–2	Wavre Sports (5)
47	Anderlues (7)	1–2	Ixelles (6)
48	Stockel (6)	2–2 (11–10 p)	Manage (5)
49	La Hulpe (8)	1–4	Biesme (6)
50	Ophain (6)	0–2	Vossem (7)
51	Gosselies (5)	4–2	Nismes (6)
52	Rhode-De Hoek (6)	4–0	Neffe (6)
53	Floreffe (7)	1–2	Léopold Uccle (5)
54	Spy (5)	0–2	Rhisnes (6)
55	Huppaytoise (7)	1–6	Taminoise (5)
56	Genappe (6)	0–3	Overijse (5)

Tie	Home team (tier)	Score	Away team (tier)
57	Lasne Ohain (6)	2–2 (2–4 p)	Montignies (6)
58	Tournai (5)	6–1	Maarkedal (8)
59	Naast (7)	0–1	Huizingen (7)
60	Péruwelz (6)	3–1	Vacresse (7)
61	Molenbaix (6)	4–1	Saint-Ghislain B (7)
62	CS Braine (5)	3–0	Le Roeulx (6)
63	Symphorinois (5)	5–1	Hyon-Quaregnon (8)
64	Saint-Ghislain A (5)	7–0	Trivières (7)
65	Zuun (8)	0–2	Le Hornu (6)
66	Frameries (7)	0–7	Stade Brainois (5)
67	Quévy-Mons (5)	7–1	ES Braine (7)
68	Tollembeek (8)	2–0	Neufvilles (7)
69	Beloeil (6)	2–0	Ostiches-Ath (5)
70	Pâturages (6)	0–3	Brakel (5)
71	Vlaamse Ardennen (6)	0–3	Jemappes (7)
72	Oostkamp (6)	8–1	Lendelede (8)
73	Adegem (6)	1–5	Mariakerke (6)
74	Wielsbeke (6)	0–2	WS Lauwe (6)
75	Torhout (5)	3–1	Kleit-Maldegem (7)
76	Boezinge (6)	2–0	Nieuwkerke (7)
77	Oostnieuwkerke (5)	3–1	Poperinge (6)
78	Aalter (6)	1–0	RC Lauwe (6)
79	St-Joris Sleidinge (7)	1–2	Drongen (7)
80	Wingene (5)	2–1	Wervik (6)
81	Oostduinkerke (6)	0–0 (1–4 p)	Blankenberge (6)
82	Vlamertinge (6)	1–2	Dottignies (7)
83	Dadizele (6)	6–1	Comines-Warneton (7)
84	Jong Zulte (6)	2–1	Lembeke (7)
85	Racing Waregem (6)	2–1	Kortemark (7)
86	Bambrugge (6)	2–0	Groot Dilbeek (7)
87	Wolvertem Merchtem (5)	4–1	TK Meldert (7)
88	HO Kalken (6)	0–2	Jong Lede (5)
89	Mariekerke (6)	6–1	Schelle (7)
90	Bornem (5)	5–1	Wintam (9)
91	Kobbegem (8)	0–7	Elene-Grotenberge (6)
92	Melsele (5)	3–1	Vrasene (7)
93	Zele (6)	0–2	Ninove (5)
94	Zaffelare (7)	1–4	Lebbeke (5)
95	Stekene (5)	4–1	Hoboken (6)
96	Zelzate (5)	5–0	Edeboys (7)
97	Lochristi (5)	2–1	Dendermonde (6)
98	Voorde-Appelterre (6)	1–4	Wetteren (5)
99	Woluwe-Zaventem (6)	1–6	Sint-Lenaarts (5)
100	Zandhoven (7)	1–4	KRC Mechelen (6)
101	Nijlen (6)	2–1	Kosova Schaerbeek (5)
102	Sint-Job (7)	2–1	Crossing Schaerbeek (6)
103	Minderhout (8)	1–2	Kontich (6)
104	Kampenhout (6)	3–1 (1–4 p)	Ganshoren (5)
105	Anderlecht-Milan (8)	FF 0–5	BO Beerzel (9)
106	Bouwel (8)	2–2 (1–2 p)	Stade Everois (6)
107	Loenhout (7)	1–1 (5–3 p)	Saint-Josse (6)
108	Ternesse (6)	2–2 (5–4 p)	Eppegem (5)
109	Zwarte Leeuw (5)	7–0	Putte (9)
110	Lyra-Lierse Berlaar (5)	4–0	Zandvliet (8)
111	Wortel (8)	1–1 (4–2 p)	Jette (5)
112	Veltem (7)	0–3	City Pirates (5)

== Second round ==
Tie	Home team (tier)	Score	Away team (tier)
113	Tournai (5)	0–4	Tienen (4)
114	Solières (4)	6–1	Kesselt (8)
115	Sprimont (5)	1–1 (2–3 p)	Oostkamp (6)
116	Blankenberge (6)	3–3 (5–3 p)	Libramont (6)
117	Harelbeke (4)	0–0 (4–5 p)	UCE Liège (6)
118	Koersel (6)	4–0	Wavre Sports (5)
119	Kontich (6)	2–3	Wijgmaal (4)
120	Temse (4)	2–0	Etterbeek (6)
121	Montignies (6)	2–1	Heur-Tongeren (5)
122	Beloeil (6)	2–1	Racing Gent (4)
123	Lebbeke (5)	12–0	Tollembeek (8)
124	Oostnieuwkerke (5)	2–1	Faimes (7)
125	Ciney (5)	0–1	Bilzen (5)
126	RAAL La Louvière (4)	2–2 (2–4 p)	Overijse (5)
127	Péruwelz (6)	1–3	De Kempen (6)
128	Stockay-Warfusée (4)	2–2 (5–4 p)	Ninove (5)
129	Sint-Lenaarts (5)	1–1 (2–4 p)	Mandel United (4)
130	Le Hornu (6)	0–1	Aywaille (5)
131	Daring Huvo Jeuk (7)	2–3	Loenhout (7)
132	Bocholt (4)	10–0	Villers la Ville (6)
133	Westhoek (4)	0–0 (3–4 p)	Lyra-Lierse Berlaar (5)
134	Spouwen-Mopertingen (4)	3–3 (4–5 p)	Aalter (6)
135	Ronse (4)	5–1	Biesme (6)
136	Londerzeel (4)	6–1	Heusden-Zolder (7)
137	Witgoor (6)	2–3	Symphorinois (6)
138	Bornem (5)	1–2	Wingene (5)
139	Saint-Ghislain (5)	1–2	Gullegem (4)
140	Dikkelvenne (4)	5–2	Mariakerke (6)
141	Tervuren-Duisburg (6)	1–3	Meux (4)
142	CS Braine (6)	2–0	Rocherath (7)
143	Grand-Leez (6)	1–1 (4–5 p)	Torhout (5)
144	Duffel (4)	3–0	United Richelle (5)
145	Helson Helchteren (5)	2–2 (3–2 p)	Vlaamse Ardennen (6)
146	Habay-La-Neuve (6)	2–0	Ethe Belmont (6)
147	Stade Everois (6)	2–0	Meix-devant-Virton (5)
148	Sint-Niklaas (4)	0–0 (4–5 p)	Alken (6)
149	Berchem (4)	3–0	Dadizele (6)
150	Rochefort (5)	0–4	Rebecq (4)
151	Zwarte Leeuw (5)	1–1 (1–4 p)	Onhaye (4)
152	Verlaine (4)	3–1	Huizingen (7)

Tie	Home team (tier)	Score	Away team (tier)
153	Raeren-Eynatten (5)	4–1	Aische (5)
154	Givry (4)	6–2	Stockel (6)
155	Namur Fosses-La-Fille (4)	2–1	Ster-Francorchamps (6)
156	Jong Zulte (6)	3–0	Hamoir (4)
157	Couvin-Mariembourg (4)	1–0	Boezinge (6)
158	Lochristi (5)	2–2 (4–5 p)	Cappellen (4)
159	Hasselt (4)	1–3	Wetteren (5)
160	Bambrugge (6)	3–3 (6–5 p)	Houtvenne (5)
161	Hades (4)	0–4	Brakel (5)
162	Elene-Grotenberge (6)	1–3	Nijlen (6)
163	Zelzate (5)	2–1	Turnhout (5)
164	Oudenaarde (4)	9–1	Wortel (8)
165	Acren Lessines (4)	2–3	Stekene (5)
166	Diest (6)	0–3	Mariekerke (6)
167	ASV Geel (4)	3–1	Léopold Uccle (5)
168	Vosselaar (4)	6–1	Linden (5)
169	WS Lauwe (6)	1–1 (5–3 p)	Wolvertem Merchtem (5)
170	Vossem (7)	0–0 (7–6 p)	Ixelles (6)
171	Pepingen-Halle (4)	11–0	BO Beerzel (9)
172	Lille (6)	1–2	Hamme (4)
173	Dottignies (7)	1–1 (3–5 p)	Racing Waregem (6)
174	Stevoort (8)	0–4	Oupeye (6)
175	Hoogstraten (4)	4–0	Molenbaix (6)
176	Gosselies (5)	2–3	Templiers-Nandrin (7)
177	Rhode-De Hoek (6)	1–1 (5–4 p)	Wellen (5)
178	Eendracht Aalst (4)	3–2	City Pirates (5)
179	Menen (4)	5–0	Andenne (6)
180	Drongen (7)	1–2	Durbuy (4)
181	Francs Borains (4)	1–0	Betekom (5)
182	Saint-Louis-Saint-Léger (6)	0–3	Herstal (5)
183	Oppagne-Wéris (5)	0–0 (5–4 p)	Petegem (4)
184	Merelbeke (4)	1–5	Albert Quévy-Mons (5)
185	Termien (5)	4–1	Esperanza Pelt (5)
186	Jong Lede (5)	0–2	Melsele (5)
187	Zwevezele (4)	2–3	Kampenhout (5)
188	Diegem (4)	3–4	SC Braine (6)
189	Jodoigne (5)	1–7	Tilleur (4)
190	Ternesse (5)	0–3	Waremme (4)
191	Knokke (4)	1–0	KRC Mechelen (6)
192	Sint-Job (7)	3–0	Rhisnes (6)

== Third round ==
Tie	Home team (tier)	Score	Away team (tier)
193	Sint-Job (7)	2–2 (4–3 p)	ASV Geel (4)
194	Overijse (5)	2–2 (2–4 p)	Oudenaarde (4)
195	Blankenberge (6)	2–0	Templiers-Nandrin (7)
196	Hoogstraten (4)	0–0 (3–5 p)	SC Braine (6)
197	Rebecq (4)	0–0 (5–4 p)	Lebbeke (5)
198	Dender EH (3)	2–0	WS Lauwe (6)
199	Stekene (5)	1–2	Torhout (5)
200	Bilzen (5)	1–1 (4–3 p)	Aalter (6)
201	Nijlen (6)	1–0	Stockay-Warfusée (4)
202	Cappellen (4)	1–1 (4–3 p)	Tessenderlo (3)
203	Dikkelvenne (4)	5–0	Kampenhout (5)
204	UCE Liège (6)	0–3	Deinze (3)
205	Ronse (4)	0–0 (4–3 p)	Waremme (4)
206	Francs Borains (4)	4–1	Koersel (6)
207	Temse (4)	2–1	Jong Zulte (6)
208	Rhode-De Hoek (6)	2–2 (3–1 p)	Symphorinois (6)
209	Aywaille (5)	0–2	Olympic Charleroi CF (3)
210	Habay-La-Neuve (6)	bye	
211	Bocholt (4)	1–2	Mandel United (4)
212	Couvin-Mariembourg (4)	2–3	Londerzeel (4)
213	Rupel Boom (3)	4–0	Racing Waregem (6)
214	Tienen (4)	2–1	Sint-Eloois-Winkel (3)
215	Namur Fosses-La-Fille (4)	2–1	URSL Visé (3)
216	Melsele (5)	0–2	Knokke (4)
217	Bambrugge (6)	2–1	Albert Quévy-Mons (5)

Tie	Home team (tier)	Score	Away team (tier)
218	Wijgmaal (4)	7–1	Oupeye (6)
219	Hamme (4)	5–1	Beloeil (6)
220	Gullegem (4)	3–1	Montignies (6)
221	Brakel (5)	1–1 (3–4 p)	Heist (3)
222	Oppagne-Wéris (5)	0–0 (4–5 p)	Wetteren (5)
223	Stade Everois (6)	1–4	Tilleur (4)
224	De Kempen (6)	bye	
225	Vosselaar (4)	1–0	Patro Eisden Maasmechelen (3)
226	Duffel (4)	bye	
227	Tubize (3)	2–0	Vossem (7)
228	Menen (4)	1–2	Durbuy (4)
229	Oostnieuwkerke (5)	0–3	RFC Liège (3)
230	Onhaye (4)	0–0 (4–3 p)	CS Braine (6)
231	Eendracht Aalst (4)	2–0	Lierse Kempenzonen (3)
232	Zelzate (5)	1–2	La Louvière Centre (3)
233	RWDM47 (3)	6–0	Alken (6)
234	Lyra-Lierse Berlaar (5)	1–0	Helson Helchteren (5)
235	Pepingen-Halle (4)	0–2	Verlaine (4)
236	Oostkamp (6)	3–1	Berchem (4)
237	Meux (4)	bye	
238	Dessel Sport (3)	3–3 (5–4 p)	Raeren-Eynatten (5)
239	Wingene (5)	0–0 (2–4 p)	Loenhout (7)
240	Solières (4)	0–2	Seraing (3)
241	Givry (4)	4–4 (5–3 p)	Termien (5)
242	Mariekerke (6)	2–1	Herstal (5)

== Fourth round ==
Tie	Home team (tier)	Score	Away team (tier)
243	Rebecq (4)	2–0	Lyra-Lierse Berlaar (5)
244	Dender EH (3)	1–3	Seraing (3)
245	Wijgmaal (4)	2–0	Nijlen (6)
246	Tilleur (4)	5–3	Tienen (4)
247	Mariekerke (6)	1–3	Ronse (4)
248	Namur Fosses-La-Fille (4)	1–2	Verlaine (4)
249	La Louvière Centre (3)	7–2	De Kempen (6)
250	Mandel United (4)	5–0	Habay-La-Neuve (6)
251	Oudenaarde (4)	1–2	Temse (4)
252	Knokke (4)	5–0	Bilzen (5)
253	Hamme (4)	1–0	Tubize (3)
254	Torhout (5)	2–1	SC Braine (6)
255	Rhode-De Hoek (6)	0–2	Onhaye (4)

Tie	Home team (tier)	Score	Away team (tier)
256	Meux (4)	0–2	Cappellen (4)
257	Blankenberge (6)	0–2	Vosselaar (4)
258	Wetteren (5)	1–1 (a.e.t.) (4–2 p)	Durbuy (4)
259	Dessel Sport (3)	4–2 (a.e.t.)	RWDM47 (3)
260	Olympic Charleroi CF (3)	1–2	Bambrugge (6)
261	Londerzeel (4)	2–4	Eendracht Aalst (4)
262	Loenhout (7)	1–4	Dikkelvenne (4)
263	Gullegem (4)	3–1	Oostkamp (6)
264	Francs Borains (4)	2–1	RFC Liège (3)
265	Sint-Job (7)	3–4 (a.e.t.)	Rupel Boom (3)
266	Givry (4)	1–5	Duffel (4)
267	Deinze (3)	0–0 (a.e.t.) (7–8 p)	Heist (3)

== Fifth round ==
Non-professional teams (tiers 3 and below) always receive the home advantage when playing professional teams, if their stadium meets the seating and safety requirements. As a result Lokeren and Roeselare had to give up their home advantage in this round.

25 August 2019 Match 268	Duffel (4)	2–1	Knokke (4)	Duffel
16:00 CEST	Nawel 21'; Verheyden 39'		Descheemaecker 78' (pen.)	Stadium: Gemeentelijk Sportcentrum

25 August 2019 Match 269	Ronse (4)	4–2	Wijgmaal (4)	Ronse
16:00 CEST				Stadium: Orphale Cruckestadion

24 August 2019 Match 270	Mandel United (4)	1–0 (a.e.t.)	Gullegem (4)	Izegem
20:00 CEST	Verspeeten 119'			Stadium: Gemeentelijk Sportcentrum

23 August 2019 Match 271	Oud-Heverlee Leuven (2)	6–0	Wetteren (5)	Leuven
20:30 CEST	Maertens 2'; Aguemon 21'; Henry 63'; Sowah 79', 90'; Allemeersch 86'	report		Stadium: Den Dreef

25 August 2019 Match 272	Francs Borains (4)	6–1	Torhout (5)	Boussu
16:00 CEST	Laï 16'; H. Chaabi 45' (pen.); Turcan 50'; Zorbo 57' (pen.); Gomis 65'; Ebosse 73'	report	36'	Stadium: Stade Robert Urbain

25 August 2019 Match 273	Cappellen (4)	1–0	Hamme (4)	Kapellen
16:00 CEST				Stadium: Stadion Jos Van Wellen

24 August 2019 Match 274	Heist (3)	0–4	Lokeren (2)	Heist-op-den-Berg
20:00 CEST			Said 6', 30'; Vande Cauter 41' (o.g.); Hupperts 67'	Stadium: Gemeentelijk Sportcentrum

25 August 2019 Match 275	Onhaye (4)	0–1	Eendracht Aalst (4)	Onhaye
16:00 CEST			Cocchiere 55'

24 August 2019 Match 276	La Louvière Centre (3)	1–2	Westerlo (2)	La Louvière
20:00 CEST	Dansoko 90'		Buyl 31'; De Schryver 81'	Stadium: Stade du Tivoli

24 August 2019 Match 277	Dessel Sport (3)	3–1	Virton (2)	Dessel
17:00 CEST	Vansimpsen 15', 72'; Breugelmans 42'	report	Turpel 86'	Stadium: Armand Melisstadion

23 August 2019 Match 278	Verlaine (4)	1–1 (a.e.t.) (4–2 p)	Bambrugge (6)	Verlaine
20:00 CEST	Guillaume 65'		Coppens 75' (pen.)	Stadium: Stade Des Six Bonniers

24 August 2019 Match 279	Seraing (3)	1–0	Roeselare (2)	Seraing
20:00 CEST	Cascio 65' (pen.)	report		Stadium: Stade du Pairay

24 August 2019 Match 280	Beerschot (2)	6–1	Dikkelvenne (4)	Antwerp
16:00 CEST	Brogno 8'; Noubissi 40'; Saint-Louis 51', 77'; Prychynenko 87' (pen.); Placca Fessou 90'		Dudouit 88' (o.g.)	Stadium: Olympisch Stadion

25 August 2019 Match 281	Rebecq (4)	2–1	Tilleur (4)	Rebecq
16:00 CEST				Stadium: Complexe Gobard

25 August 2019 Match 282	Rupel Boom (3)	4–2 (a.e.t.)	Vosselaar (4)	Boom
16:00 CEST	Spaenhoven 38'; Binst 69', 110', 117'		Van De Vel 26'; Verheyen 89'	Stadium: Gemeentelijk Parkstadion

24 August 2019 Match 283	Lommel (2)	4–0	Temse (4)	Lommel
20:00 CEST	Hendrickx 38'; Santermans 47'; Cerigioni 52'; Zaroury 79'	report		Stadium: Soevereinstadion

1. Order of legs reversed as non-professional team received home advantage.

== Sixth round ==
The draw for the sixth round was made on 26 August 2019 and included the teams from the Belgian First Division A and Union SG, the latter replacing KV Mechelen which were banned from the competition after being found guilty of match-fixing. The 16 teams entering at this stage were seeded and could not meet each other.

24 September 2019	Cercle Brugge (1)	0–1	Rebecq (4)	Bruges
20:00 CEST		report	Rosy 10'	Stadium: Jan Breydel Stadium

24 September 2019	Waasland-Beveren (1)	3–4	Westerlo (2)	Beveren
20:00 CEST	Emmers 35'; Durmishaj 41' (pen.), 45' (pen.)	report	Janssens 33' (pen.); Keïta 51' (o.g.); Gboho 55'; De Schryver 90'	Stadium: Freethiel Stadion

24 September 2019	Ronse (4)	0–3	Genk (1)	Ronse
20:30 CEST		report	Odey 58'; Heynen 71' (pen.); Onuachu 82'	Stadium: Orphale Cruckestadion

25 September 2019	Cappellen (4)	0–0 (a.e.t.) (3-5 p)	Eupen (1)	Kapellen
20:00 CEST		report		Stadium: Stadion Jos Van Wellen
	Penalties
	R. Kil (penalty scored); S. Kil (penalty scored); Walen De Keyser (penalty scored); Van Kerckhoven (penalty missed)		(penalty scored) Ciampichetti; (penalty scored) Milićević; (penalty scored) Verdon; (penalty scored) Schouterden; (penalty scored) Rocha

25 September 2019	Zulte Waregem (1)	4–2	Duffel (4)	Waregem
20:00 CEST	Govea 44'; Bruno 59', 81'; Larin 71'	report	Verlinden 5'; Cobos Copado 86' (pen.)	Stadium: Regenboogstadion

25 September 2019	Rupel Boom (3)	2–3	Charleroi (1)	Boom
20:00 CEST	Laureys 41', 88'	report	Rezaei 31', 86'; Gholizadeh 50'	Stadium: Gemeentelijk Parkstadion

25 September 2019	Union SG (2)	3–0	Verlaine (4)	Forest, Brussels
20:00 CEST	Young 34'; Fixelles 89' (pen.); Ferber 90+3'	report		Stadium: Stade Joseph Marien

25 September 2019	Seraing (3)	1–3	Kortrijk (1)	Seraing
20:00 CEST	Sanogo 32'	report	Hornby 23'; Kage 37'; De Sart 90+2'	Stadium: Stade du Pairay

25 September 2019	Mandel United (4)	0–2	Oostende (1)	Izegem
20:00 CEST		report	Rajsel 9' (pen.); Sakala 89'	Stadium: Gemeentelijk Sportcentrum

25 September 2019	Sint-Truiden (1)	2–0 (a.e.t.)	Oud-Heverlee Leuven (2)	Sint-Truiden
20:30 CEST	Boli 98'; Botaka 114'	report		Stadium: Stayen

25 September 2019	Eendracht Aalst (4)	0–4	Gent (1)	Aalst
20:30 CEST		report	Kvilitaia 9', 63'; Kubo 70'; Mbayo 83'	Stadium: Pierre Cornelisstadion

25 September 2019	Dessel Sport (3)	0–1	Excel Mouscron (1)	Dessel
20:30 CEST		report	Olinga 11'	Stadium: Armand Melisstadion

25 September 2019	Francs Borains (4)	0–3	Club Brugge (1)	Boussu
20:30 CEST		report	Tau 73'; Okereke 81', 85'	Stadium: Stade Robert Urbain

25 September 2019	Beerschot (2)	2–3 (a.e.t.)	Anderlecht (1)	Antwerp
20:45 CEST	Holzhauser 20'; Brogno 89'	report	Nasri 41'; Bourdin 79' (o.g.); Kiese Thelin 106'	Stadium: Olympisch Stadion; Referee: Nicolas Laforge

26 September 2019	Antwerp (1)	4–2 (a.e.t.)	Lokeren (2)	Antwerp
20:30 CEST	Mbokani 5'; Miyoshi 33', 98'; Baby 114'	report	Beridze 1'; Navarro 83'	Stadium: Bosuilstadion

26 September 2019	Standard Liège (1)	2–1	Lommel (2)	Liège
20:30 CEST	Boljević 17', 90+2'	report	Sanyang 54'	Stadium: Stade Maurice Dufrasne

== Seventh Round ==
The draw for the seventh round was made immediately after the last game of the sixth round, between Antwerp and Lokeren, was finished. Only three teams outside the top division qualified for this round, with Rebecq from the Belgian Second Amateur Division the lowest still in the competition.

The matches will be played on 3, 4 and 5 of December 2019.

3 December 2019	Antwerp (1)	3–3 (a.e.t.) (4–3 p)	Genk (1)	Antwerp
20:45 CET	Juklerød 29'; Mbokani 72', 105'	report	Mæhle 4'; Hoedt 80' (o.g.); Ito 105+1'	Stadium: Bosuilstadion; Referee: Lothar D'Hondt
	Penalties
	Refaelov (penalty scored); Hoedt (penalty missed); Buta (penalty scored); Juklerød (penalty scored); Mbokani (penalty scored)		(penalty scored) Samatta; (penalty scored) Berge; (penalty scored) Lucumí; (penalty missed) Ito; (penalty missed) Wouters

4 December 2019	Zulte Waregem (1)	3–0	Sint-Truiden (1)	Waregem
20:00 CET	Govea 14', 56'; Bruno 72'	report		Stadium: Regenboogstadion

4 December 2019	Kortrijk (1)	2–1	Eupen (1)	Kortrijk
20:00 CET	Mboyo 68' (pen.); Ezatolahi 70' (o.g.)	report	Marreh 15'	Stadium: Guldensporen Stadion

4 December 2019	Standard Liège (1)	3–0	Rebecq (4)	Liège
20:00 CET	Boljević 23'; Čop 59'; Fai 66'	report		Stadium: Stade Maurice Dufrasne

4 December 2019	Union SG (2)	0–0 (a.e.t.) (4–1 p)	Westerlo (2)	Forest, Brussels
20:00 CET				Stadium: Stade Joseph Marien
	Penalties
	Teuma (penalty scored); Fixelles (penalty scored); Haugen (penalty scored); Nielsen (penalty scored)		(penalty missed) Van Eenoo; (penalty missed) Dewaele; (penalty scored) De Schryver

4 December 2019	Oostende (1)	1–1 (a.e.t.) (2–4 p)	Club Brugge (1)	Ostend
20:30 CET	Sylla 3'		Diatta 73'	Stadium: Versluys Arena; Referee: Jonathan Lardot
	Penalties
	Neto (penalty missed); Milović (penalty scored); Palaversa (penalty scored); Ndenbe (penalty missed)		(penalty scored) Vanaken; (penalty scored) Vormer; (penalty scored) Schrijvers; (penalty scored) Balanta

4 December 2019	Charleroi (1)	1–0	Gent (1)	Charleroi
20:45 CET	Bruno 84'	report		Stadium: Stade du Pays de Charleroi

5 December 2019	Excel Mouscron (1)	2–3	Anderlecht (1)	Mouscron
20:45 CET	Perica 12'; Omoigui 78'		Roofe 20'; Doku 44'; Luckassen 56'	Stadium: Stade Le Canonnier

== Quarter-finals ==
The draw for the quarter-finals was made immediately after the last game of the seventh round, between Excel Mouscron and Anderlecht was finished. Only one team from outside the top division remained at this stage of the competition, Union SG playing in the Belgian First Division B, who also reached the semifinals the previous season.

The matches were played on 17, 18 and 19 December 2019.

17 December 2019	Zulte Waregem (1)	2–0	Charleroi (1)	Waregem
20:45 CET	Berahino 48'; Larin 90+3'	report		Stadium: Regenboogstadion; Referee: Jan Boterberg

18 December 2019	Union SG (2)	0–1	Kortrijk (1)	Forest, Brussels
20:00 CET		report	Kagelmacher 89'	Stadium: Stade Joseph Marien; Referee: Lothar D'Hondt

18 December 2019	Standard Liège (1)	1–3	Antwerp (1)	Liège
20:45 CET	Lestienne 24'		De Laet 48'; Benson 67'; Mbokani 85'	Stadium: Stade Maurice Dufrasne; Referee: Erik Lambrechts

19 December 2019	Anderlecht (1)	0–2	Club Brugge (1)	Anderlecht, Brussels
20:45 CET			Vormer 48'; Balanta 65'	Stadium: Constant Vanden Stock Stadium; Referee: Bram Van Driessche

== Semi-finals ==
The draw for the semi-finals was made immediately after the last game of the seventh round, between Anderlecht and Club Brugge was finished. The first leg matches were played on 22 and 23 January 2020, the second legs on 5 and 6 February 2020.

=== First Legs ===
22 January 2020	Club Brugge (1)	1–1	Zulte Waregem (1)	Bruges
20:45 CET	Rits 54'	report	Berahino 60'	Stadium: Jan Breydel Stadium; Referee: Wesley Alen

23 January 2020	Antwerp (1)	1–1	Kortrijk (1)	Antwerp
20:45 CET	Mbokani 84'	report	Stojanović 70'	Stadium: Bosuilstadion; Referee: Jonathan Lardot

=== Second Legs ===
5 February 2020	Zulte Waregem (1)	1–2	Club Brugge (1)	Waregem
20:45 CET	Oberlin 78'	report	Mechele 54'; De Ketelaere 87'	Stadium: Regenboogstadion; Referee: Alexandre Boucaut

Club Brugge win 3–2 on aggregate

6 February 2020	Kortrijk (1)	0–1	Antwerp (1)	Kortrijk
20:45 CET		report	Refaelov 36' (pen.)	Stadium: Guldensporen Stadion; Referee: Nicolas Laforge

Antwerp win 2–1 on aggregate

== Final ==
1 August 2020
20:30

Club Brugge	0–1	Antwerp
		Refaelov 25'

King Baudouin Stadium, Brussels
Attendance: 0 (Note: The final was played behind closed doors due to the COVID-19 pandemic in Belgium.)
Referee: Nicolas Laforge
