= Akira Kaji =

Japanese footballer

Akira Kaji 加地 亮
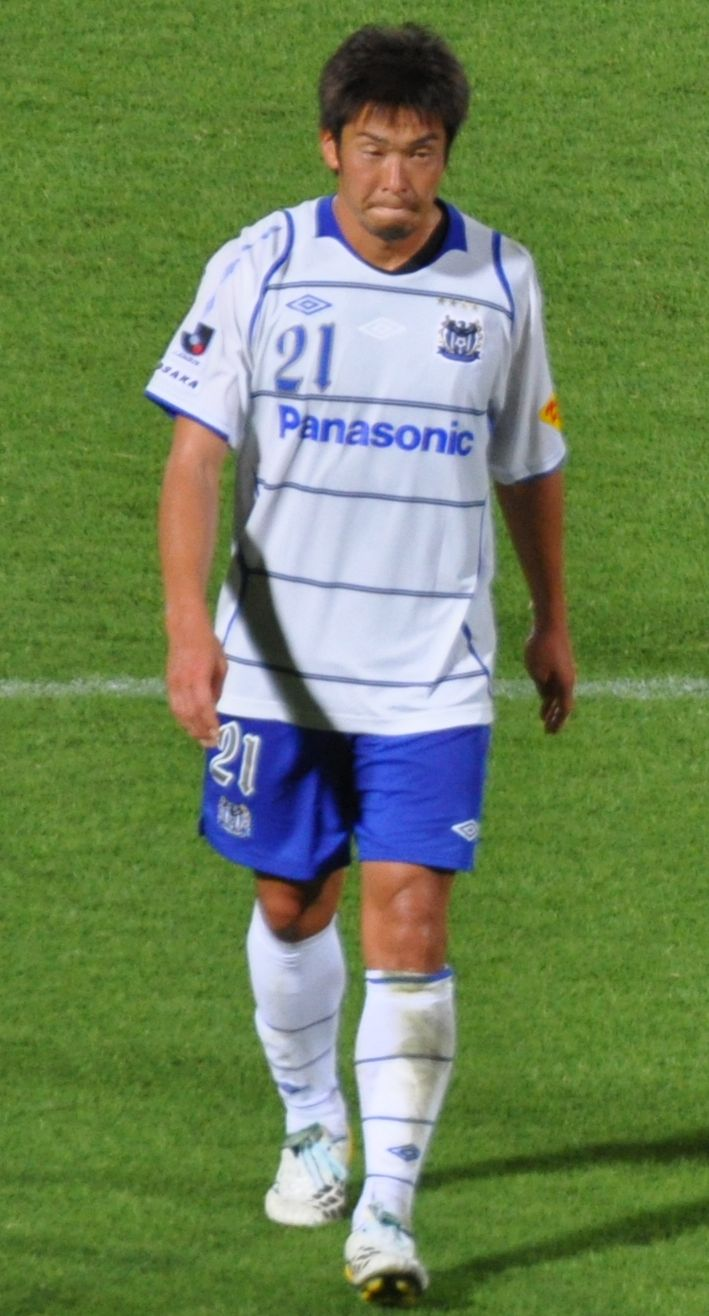
- Kaji with Gamba Osaka in 2010

Personal information
- Full name: Akira Kaji
- Date of birth: 13 January 1980 (age 46)
- Place of birth: Minamiawaji, Hyogo, Japan
- Height: 1.77 m (5 ft 10 in)
- Position: Defender

Youth career
- 1995–1997: Takigawa Daini High School

Senior career*
Years	Team	Apps	(Gls)
1998–1999	Cerezo Osaka	24	(0)
2000–2001	Oita Trinita	75	(3)
2002–2005	FC Tokyo	89	(1)
2006–2014	Gamba Osaka	225	(2)
2014	Chivas USA	15	(0)
2015–2017	Fagiano Okayama	86	(1)
Total		514	(7)

International career
1998–1999	Japan U20	8	(1)
2003–2008	Japan	64	(2)
Medal record
FC Tokyo
Winner	J.League Cup	2004
Gamba Osaka
Winner	AFC Champions League	2008
Winner	J1 League	2014
Runner-up	J1 League	2010
Winner	J.League Cup	2007
Winner	J.League Cup	2014
Winner	Emperor's Cup	2008
Winner	Emperor's Cup	2009
Winner	Emperor's Cup	2014
Runner-up	Emperor's Cup	2006
Runner-up	Emperor's Cup	2012
Representing Japan
AFC Asian Cup
Gold medal – first place	2004 China
FIFA U-20 World Cup
Silver medal – second place	1999 Nigeria
AFC U-19 Championship
Silver medal – second place	1998 Thailand
- * Club domestic league appearances and goals

Akira Kaji (加地 亮, Kaji Akira; born 13 January 1980) is a Japanese former professional footballer who played as a defender. He played for the Japan national team from 2003 until 2008.

== Club career ==
After graduating from Takigawa Daini High School, Kaji joined Cerezo Osaka in 1998. He made his first league appearance on 25 July 1998 against Avispa Fukuoka. At the club, he found it difficult to break into the first team and was loaned out to J2 League side Oita Trinita at the start of the 2000 season.

After spending two years at Oita, Kaji came back to J1 League in 2002 to play for FC Tokyo. The manager Hiromi Hara made him a regular and assigned a more attacking role. His club won the 2004 J.League Cup by beating Urawa Reds in the final which ended 0–0 after the extra time. The penalty shoot-out was required and his successful conversion as the last penalty taker for Tokyo finally broke the deadlock.

He was transferred to Gamba Osaka at the beginning of the 2006 season and scored in the beginning league match against Urawa Reds. He was selected as a member of the 2006 J.League Best XI. The club won the champions 2007 J.League Cup, 2008 and 2009 Emperor's Cup. In Asia, the club won the champions 2008 AFC Champions League and the 3rd place 2008 Club World Cup. From 2012, his opportunity to play decreased for injury.

After eight years with Gamba Osaka, Kaji signed with Major League Soccer club Chivas USA on 24 June 2014. However, the club was disbanded in 2014, he returned to Japan and joined Fagiano Okayama in 2015. He retired end of 2017 season.

== International career ==
Kaji was a member of the Japan U20 national team for the 1999 World Youth Championship finals where the team finished runners-up.

He gained his first cap for Japan national team when national coach Zico played him on 8 October 2003 in a friendly against Tunisia. He was rated highly by Zico who made him the first-choice right full-back. He was a member of the Japan team which won the 2004 AFC Asian Cup in China. In a 2005 FIFA Confederations Cup against Brazil, his goal was disallowed by a controversial offside decision. His first goal for the country finally came on 17 August 2005 in a 2006 FIFA World Cup qualification against Iran.

He made the final squad for the 2006 FIFA World Cup finals. In a preparation match against Germany just before the tournament, he injured his ankle when tackled by Bastian Schweinsteiger. Zico considered his replacement but decided to keep him. He missed Japan's first game in the tournament against Australia with Yuichi Komano filling in for his place, but he returned to the team and played in the rest of the competition.

After the 2006 World Cup, Zico was replaced by Ivica Osim who also regularly picked him for the national team. He was a member of the Japan team for the 2007 AFC Asian Cup and played all the Japan games in the tournament. On 20 May 2008, he announced retirement from international football. He played 64 games and scored 2 goals for Japan until 2008.

== Career statistics ==
=== Club ===
Appearances and goals by club, season and competition
Club	Season	League		Emperor's Cup		J.League Cup		Continental (Note: Includes AFC Champions League and FIFA Club World Cup)		Total	
Club	Season	Apps	Goals	Apps	Goals	Apps	Goals	Apps	Goals	Apps	Goals
Cerezo Osaka	1998	15	0	1	0	1	1	–		17	1
Cerezo Osaka	1999	9	0	0	0	0	0	–		9	0
Oita Trinita	2000	34	3	2	0	1	0	–		37	3
Oita Trinita	2001	41	0	2	0	4	0	–		47	0
FC Tokyo	2002	20	1	1	0	6	0	–		27	1
FC Tokyo	2003	22	0	2	0	6	0	–		30	0
FC Tokyo	2004	22	0	3	0	1	0	–		26	0
FC Tokyo	2005	25	0	2	0	0	0	–		27	0
Gamba Osaka	2006	29	1	5	1	0	0	5	0	39	2
Gamba Osaka	2007	28	1	4	1	6	0	–		38	2
Gamba Osaka	2008	26	0	5	0	4	0	11	0	43	0
Gamba Osaka	2009	20	0	5	1	0	0	1	0	26	1
Gamba Osaka	2010	32	0	2	0	2	0	6	0	42	0
Gamba Osaka	2011	30	0	1	0	0	0	6	0	37	0
Gamba Osaka	2012	16	0	5	0	1	0	5	0	27	0
Gamba Osaka	2013	38	0	2	0	–		–		40	0
Gamba Osaka	2014	6	0	0	0	0	0	–		6	0
Fagiano Okayama	2015	36	0	1	0	–		–		37	0
Fagiano Okayama	2016	26	1	0	0	–		–		26	1
Fagiano Okayama	2017	24	0	0	0	–		–		24	0
Career total		499	7	38	3	32	1	34	0	608	11

=== International ===
Appearances and goals by national team and year
National team	Year	Apps	Goals
Japan	2003	1	0
Japan	2004	20	0
Japan	2005	14	1
Japan	2006	14	0
Japan	2007	11	1
Japan	2008	4	0
Total		64	2

Scores and results list Japan's goal tally first, score column indicates score after each Kaji goal.

List of international goals scored by Akira Kaji
No.	Date	Venue	Opponent	Score	Result	Competition
1	17 August 2005	Yokohama, Japan	Iran		2–1	2006 FIFA World Cup qualification
2	17 October 2007	Osaka, Japan	Egypt		4–1	2007 Afro-Asian Cup of Nations

== Honors ==
- AFC Champions League – 2008
- Emperor's Cup – 2008, 2009
- J.League Cup – 2004, 2007
- Japanese Super Cup – 2007

Japan

- AFC Asian Cup – 2004
- FIFA World Youth Championship – 1999 (Runner-up)

Individual

- J.League Best XI – 2006
