= 2019–20 RSC Anderlecht season =

Anderlecht
2019–20 season
- Chairman: Marc Coucke
- Manager: Vincent Kompany (1 July – 22 August); Simon Davies (1 July – 3 October); Franky Vercauteren (3 October – End of season); Simon Davies (3 October – End of season as an individual coach)
- Ground: Constant Vanden Stock Stadium
- Belgian First Division A: 8th
- Belgian Cup: Quarter-finals
- Top goalscorer: League: Michel Vlap (11 goals); All: Michel Vlap (11 goals)
- Average home league attendance: 19,375
Home colours	Away colours	Third colours

The 2019–20 season was the 112th season played by Anderlecht. The season covered the period from 1 July 2019 to 30 June 2020. Anderlecht participated in the Belgian First Division A and the Belgian Cup. The club did not participate in any UEFA competition this season, having missed out on European qualification for the first time in 56 years.

== Match details ==
=== Regular season ===
Pos	Team	Pld	W	D	L	GF	GA	GD	Pts
6	Mechelen	29	13	5	11	46	43	+3	44
7	Genk	29	13	5	11	45	42	+3	44
8	Anderlecht	29	11	10	8	45	29	+16	43
9	Zulte Waregem	29	10	6	13	41	49	−8	36
10	Excel Mouscron	29	9	9	11	38	40	−2	36

Source: Belgian First Division A (in Dutch), Soccerway
Rules for classification: 1) Points; 2) Matches won; 3) Goal difference; 4) Goals scored; 5) Away goals scored; 6) Away matches won; 7) Play-off.

==== Matches ====
Belgian First Division A match details
Date	League position	Opponents	Venue	Result	Score F–A	Scorers	Attendance	Ref
28 July 2019	10th	KV Oostende	H	L	1–2	Vlap 13'	19,000	
4 August 2019	11th	Royal Excel Mouscron	A	D	0–0		8,257	
9 August 2019	13th	Mechelen	H	D	0–0		19,000	
17 August 2019	13th	Kortrijk	A	L	2–4	Nasri 26', Vlap 66' pen.	9,000	
23 August 2019	14th	Genk	A	L	0–1		22,105	
1 September 2019	13th	Standard Liège	H	W	1–0	Saelemaekers 31'	19,500	
15 September 2019	13th	Antwerp	H	L	1–2	Chadli 65'	19,500	
22 September 2019	13th	Club Brugge	A	L	1–2	Chadli 5'	26,500	
29 September 2019	13th	Waasland-Beveren	H	D	0–0		18,751	
4 October 2019	13th	Sporting Charleroi	A	W	2–1	Verschaeren 12', Chadli 64'	13,332	
20 October 2019	11th	Sint-Truiden	H	W	4–1	Chadli (2) 5', 64', Kana 10', Roofe 67'	19,000	
25 October 2019	11th	AS Eupen	A	D	0–0		5,082	
31 October 2019	12th	Gent	H	D	3–3	Verschaeren 17', Roofe (2) 68' pen., 70'	21,500	
3 November 2019	11th	Cercle Brugge	H	W	2–1	Roofe 10' pen., Saelemaekers 19'	19,000	
8 November 2019	10th	Zulte-Waregem	A	W	2–1	Chadli 4', Roofe 81'	10,068	
24 November 2019	10th	Kortrijk	H	D	0–0		19,503	
1 December 2019	11th	KV Oostende	A	L	2–3	Chadli 84', Doku 90+1'	6,079	
8 December 2019	11th	Sporting Charleroi	H	D	0–0		19,000	
15 December 2019	10th	Standard Liège	A	D	1–1	Roofe 67'	26,972	
22 December 2019	10th	Genk	H	W	2–0	Vlap (2) 54', 61'	19,000	
27 December 2019	9th	Antwerp	A	D	0–0		15,073	
19 January 2020	9th	Club Brugge	H	L	1–2	Colassin 21'	20,000	
26 January 2020	9th	Cercle Brugge	A	W	2–1	Amuzu 87', Vlap 90+4'	5,192	
2 February 2020	9th	Royal Excel Mouscron	H	W	1–0	Colassin 70'	18,000	
7 February 2020	9th	Gent	A	D	1–1	Colassin 14'	20,000	
15 February 2020	9th	Mechelen	A	L	0–2		16,500	
23 February 2020	8th	AS Eupen	H	W	6–1	Murillo 9', Vlap 17' pen., Pjaca 25', Kompany 35', Amuzu 52', Bakkali 90+1'	20,000	
29 February 2020	8th	Waasland-Beveren	A	W	3–0	Vlap (2) 8', 66', Amuzu 90+4' pen.	7,253	
7 March 2020	8th	Zulte-Waregem	H	W	7–0	Pletinckx 7' o.g., Vlap (3) 16', 65' pen., 83', Doku (2) 49', 83', Chadli 86'		

=== Belgian Cup ===
Belgian Cup match details
Round	Date	Opponents	Venue	Result	Score F–A	Scorers	Attendance	Ref
Sixth round	25 September 2019	Beerschot-Wilrijk	A	W	3–2	Nasri 41', Bourdin 80' o.g., Thelin 106'		
Seventh round	5 December 2019	Royal Excel Mouscron	A	W	3–2	Roofe 20', Doku 44', Luckassen 56'	5,190	
Quarter final	19 December 2019	Club Brugge	H	L	0–2		20,000	

== Appearances and goals ==
Numbers in parentheses denote appearances as substitute.
Players with names struck through and marked † left the club during the playing season.
Players with names in italics and marked * were on loan from another club for the whole of their season with Anderlecht.
Players listed with no appearances have been in the matchday squad but only as unused substitutes.
Key to positions: GK – Goalkeeper; DF – Defender; MF – Midfielder; FW – Forward

Players contracted for the 2019–20 season
No.	Pos.	Nat.	Name	League		Cup		Total		Discipline	
No.	Pos.	Nat.	Name	Apps	Goals	Apps	Goals	Apps	Goals	A yellow rectangle, denoting the yellow penalty card shown to a player being cautioned	A red rectangle, denoting the red penalty card shown to a player being sent off
1	GK	BEL	Frank Boeckx	0	0	0	0	0	0	0	0
2	DF	POR	Josué Sá	0	0	0	0	0	0	0	0
3	DF	WAL	James Lawrence	0	0	0	0	0	0	0	0
4	DF	BEL	Vincent Kompany	15	1	3	0	18	1	2	0
5	DF	UKR	Yevhen Makarenko	0	0	0	0	0	0	0	0
6	MF	ROU	Alexandru Chipciu	0	0	0	0	0	0	0	0
7	MF	HON	Andy Najar	0	0	0	0	0	0	0	0
8	MF	BEL	Pieter Gerkens	5 (2)	0	0	0	5 (2)	0	0	0
9	FW	BEL	Landry Dimata	0	0	0	0	0	0	0	0
10	MF	NED	Michel Vlap	18 (5)	11	2	0	20 (5)	11	1	0
14	MF	FRA	Samir Nasri	5 (2)	1	1	1	6 (2)	2	1	0
15	MF	USA	Kenny Saief	0	0	0	0	0	0	0	0
16	GK	FRA	Thomas Didillon	1	0	0	0	1	0	0	0
17	MF	SRB	Luka Adžić	1 (4)	0	0 (1)	0	1 (5)	0	0	0
19	MF	BEL	Nacer Chadli *	15 (2)	8	1 (1)	0	16 (3)	8	3	0
20	MF	BEL	~~Sven Kums~~ †	0	0	0	0	0	0	0	0
20	FW	CRO	Marko Pjaca *	2 (2)	1	0	0	2 (2)	1	0	0
22	DF	BEL	Elias Cobbaut	22 (2)	0	2	0	24 (2)	0	0	0
23	MF	AUT	Peter Žulj	16 (6)	0	0	0	16 (6)	0	4	0
24	FW	SWE	Isaac Kiese Thelin	2 (8)	0	0 (2)	1	2 (10)	1	1	0
25	MF	FRA	Adrien Trebel	3 (1)	0	0	0	3 (1)	0	1	0
28	MF	SER	Dejan Joveljić *	4 (1)	0	0	0	4 (1)	0	1	0
30	GK	BEL	Hendrik Van Crombrugge	28	0	3	0	31	0	0	0
32	DF	NED	Derrick Luckassen *	18	0	3	1	21	1	2	1
33	GK	BEL	Davy Roef	0	0	0	0	0	0	0	0
34	DF	NED	Philippe Sandler *	9	0	2	0	11	0	3	0
38	FW	GHA	Dauda Mohammed	0	0	0	0	0	0	0	0
39	MF	COD	Edo Kayembe	9 (9)	0	2 (1)	0	11 (10)	0	3	0
40	FW	BEL	Francis Amuzu	11 (9)	3	1	0	12 (9)	3	2	0
41	DF	GHA	Emmanuel Sowah	0	0	0	0	0	0	0	0
43	DF	BEL	Thierry Lutonda	0 (1)	0	0	0	0 (1)	0	0	0
44	DF	CRO	Antonio Milić	0	0	0	0	0	0	0	0
45	DF	BEL	~~Sebastiaan Bornauw~~ †	1	0	0	0	1	0	1	0
46	MF	BEL	Anouar Ait El Hadj	0 (2)	0	0	0	0 (2)	0	0	0
47	DF	MLI	~~Abdoul Karim Danté~~ †	0	0	0	0	0	0	0	0
47	DF	BEL	Lucas Lissens	0	0	0	0	0	0	0	0
48	FW	BEL	Albert Sambi Lokonga	22 (1)	0	3	0	25 (1)	0	3	1
49	FW	BEL	Jérémy Doku	14 (7)	3	2 (1)	1	16 (8)	4	3	1
50	MF	BEL	Sieben Dewaele	14 (1)	0	0 (1)	0	14 (2)	0	3	1
51	MF	BEL	Yari Verschaeren	17 (4)	2	0 (1)	0	17 (5)	2	1	0
52	DF	BEL	Hotman El Kababri	1	0	0	0	1	0	1	0
53	MF	BEL	Antoine Colassin	4	3	0	0	4	3	0	0
54	DF	BEL	Killian Sardella	15 (3)	0	1 (1)	0	16 (4)	0	3	0
55	DF	BEL	Marco Kana	12 (3)	1	1 (1)	0	13 (4)	1	3	0
56	MF	BEL	Alexis Saelemaekers	14 (2)	2	3	0	17 (2)	2	5	0
60	FW	CIV	Olivier Dhauholou	0	0	0	0	0	0	0	0
62	DF	PAN	Michael Amir Murillo	8	1	0	0	8	1	2	0
92	DF	JAM	Kemar Lawrence	0 (1)	0	0	0	0 (1)	0	0	0
93	FW	JAM	Kemar Roofe	13	6	3	1	16	7	2	0
99	MF	BEL	Zakaria Bakkali	0 (4)	1	0	0	0 (4)	1	1	0

== See also ==
- 2019–20 in Belgian football
- 2019–20 Belgian First Division A
- 2019–20 Belgian Cup
