= Yuta Toyokawa =

Japanese footballer (born 1994)

Yuta Toyokawa 豊川 雄太
Personal information
- Full name: Yuta Toyokawa
- Date of birth: 9 September 1994 (age 32)
- Place of birth: Kumamoto, Japan
- Height: 1.71 m (5 ft 7 in)
- Position: Forward

Team information
- Current team: RB Omiya Ardija
- Number: 10

Youth career
- Kumamoto United SC
- –2009: FCK Marry Gold Kumamoto
- 2010–2012: Ohzu High School

Senior career*
Years	Team	Apps	(Gls)
2013–2018	Kashima Antlers	23	(2)
2014–2015	→ J.League U-22 (loan)	5	(1)
2016–2017	→ Fagiano Okayama (loan)	73	(18)
2018–2019	Eupen	48	(11)
2020–2021	Cerezo Osaka	45	(6)
2022–2024	Kyoto Sanga	74	(16)
2025–	RB Omiya Ardija	39	(7)

International career
- Japan U19
- Japan U21
- Japan U23
Medal record
Representing Japan
AFC U-23 Championship
Gold medal – first place	2016 Qatar
- * Club domestic league appearances and goals as of 21:09, 10 June 2026 (UTC)

Yuta Toyokawa (豊川 雄太, Toyokawa Yūta; born 9 September 1994) is a Japanese professional footballer who plays as a forward for J2 League club RB Omiya Ardija.

== Club career ==
=== Kashima Antlers ===
In 2013, Toyokawa started playing for Kashima Antlers in the J. League Division 1. He made his debut for the club in a 4–0 away win against Ventforet Kofu. He scored his first goal for the club in a 3–0 win against Sagan Tosu. He also had a loan spell at Fagiano Okayama where he scored 20 goals in 80 games in all competitions over a two-year loan spell.

=== Eupen ===
On 5 January 2018, Belgian First Division A side Eupen managed by Claude Makélélé announced they had signed Toyokawa from English side Leeds United on loan. However, after Leeds denied they had signed Toyokawa, on 21 January 2018, Eupen (who are owned by Aspire Academy who also have an official partnership with Leeds United), confirmed they had in fact signed Toyokawa directly from Kashima Antlers on an 18-month deal but had held 'consultation' with Leeds United prior to signing the player. He made his debut for Eupen as a substitute on 17 February against Zulte Waregem in a 3–2 defeat.

On 11 March 2018, Toyokawa became a cult hero at Eupen, on the final day of the Belgium Jupiler Pro League season, Eupen drawing 0–0 against Royal Excel Mouscron with 20 minutes to go, were in the relegation position with relegation rivals KV Mechelen 2–0 up and thus KV Mechelen were at that point staying up on 'goal difference', Eupen needing four goals brought on Toyokawa in the 57th minute. He scored a hat-trick and also gained an assist for Eupen in the final 17 minutes of the game against Mouscron to earn Eupen a 4–0 victory and to stay up by a one goal better goal difference.

With the league splitting into qualification for European places in the 2017–18 Belgian First Division A, Toyokawa scored a further 4 goals in 8 games, taking his tally for the 2017–18 season to 8 goals in 12 games for Eupen.

=== RB Omiya Ardija ===
On 29 December 2024, Toyokawa announcement officially transfer to J2 promoted club, RB Omiya Ardija from 2025 season.

== International career ==
Toyokawa has represented Japan U23's and was part of the Japan U23's that won the AFC U-23 Championship on 31 January 2016, he played in the final for Japan U23's as a substitute in a 3–2 victory against South Korea U23.

== Career statistics ==
As of match played 6 June 2026

Appearances and goals by club, season and competition
Club	Season	League			National cup (Note: Includes Emperor's Cup, Belgian Cup)		League cup (Note: Includes J.League Cup)		Continental		Other		Total	
Club	Season	Division	Apps	Goals	Apps	Goals	Apps	Goals	Apps	Goals	Apps	Goals	Apps	Goals
Kashima Antlers	2013	J.League Div 1	0	0	0	0	0	0	—		—		0	0
Kashima Antlers	2014	J.League Div 1	17	2	0	0	3	0	—		—		20	2
Kashima Antlers	2015	J1 League	6	0	2	1	1	0	0	0	—		9	1
Kashima Antlers	Total		23	2	2	1	4	0	0	0	—		29	3
Fagiano Okayama	2016	J2 League	38	10	3	2	—		—		2 (Note: Appearances in J1 League promotion play-offs)	0	43	12
Fagiano Okayama	2017	J2 League	35	8	1	0	—		—		0	0	36	8
Fagiano Okayama	Total		73	18	4	2	—		—		2	0	79	20
Eupen	2017–18	First Division A	4	3	0	0	—		—		8	4	12	7
Eupen	2018–19	First Division A	28	7	0	0	—		—		10	2	38	9
Eupen	2019–20	First Division A	16	1	1	0	—		—		—		17	1
Eupen	Total		48	11	1	0	—		—		18	6	67	17
Cerezo Osaka	2020	J1 League	21	5	0	0	2	1	—		—		23	6
Cerezo Osaka	2021	J1 League	24	1	3	0	1	0	—		—		28	1
Cerezo Osaka	Total		45	6	3	0	3	1	—		—		51	7
Kyoto Sanga	2022	J2 League	22	2	3	1	6	1	—		1	1	32	5
Kyoto Sanga	2023	J1 League	27	10	0	0	3	0	—		—		30	10
Kyoto Sanga	2024	J1 League	25	4	3	1	—		—		0	0	28	5
Kyoto Sanga	Total		74	16	6	2	9	1	—		1	1	90	20
RB Omiya Ardija	2025	J2 League	37	7	0	0	0	0	—		0	0	37	7
RB Omiya Ardija	2026	J2/J3	2	0	—		—		—		—		2	0
RB Omiya Ardija	Total		39	7	0	0	0	0	—		0	0	39	7
Career total			302	60	16	5	16	2	0	0	21	7	355	74

== Honours ==
Japan U-23

- AFC U-23 Championship: 2016
