= Limbombe =

Limbombe is a surname. Notable people with the surname include:

- Anthony Limbombe (born 1994), Belgian footballer
- Bryan Limbombe (born 2001), Belgian footballer
- Stallone Limbombe (born 1991), Belgian footballer
