= 2015 Fagiano Okayama season =

Fagiano Okayama
2015 season
- Manager: Tetsu Nagasawa
- Stadium: City Light Stadium
- J2 League: 11th

2015 Fagiano Okayama season.

== J2 League ==
=== League table ===
Pos	Team	Pld	W	D	L	GF	GA	GD	Pts
9	JEF United Chiba	42	15	12	15	50	45	+5	57
10	Consadole Sapporo	42	14	15	13	47	43	+4	57
11	Fagiano Okayama	42	12	18	12	40	35	+5	54
12	Zweigen Kanazawa	42	12	18	12	46	43	+3	54
13	Roasso Kumamoto	42	13	14	15	42	45	−3	53

Source: Meiji Yasuda J2 League Standing
Rules for classification: 1) Points; 2) Goal difference; 3) Goals scored

=== Match details ===
J2 League match details
Match	Date	Team	Score	Team	Venue	Attendance
1	2015.03.08	Fagiano Okayama	3-0	FC Gifu	City Light Stadium	10,995
2	2015.03.15	Oita Trinita	0-1	Fagiano Okayama	Oita Bank Dome	8,310
3	2015.03.21	Fagiano Okayama	1-1	Cerezo Osaka	City Light Stadium	15,820
4	2015.03.29	JEF United Chiba	1-0	Fagiano Okayama	Fukuda Denshi Arena	9,177
5	2015.04.01	Fagiano Okayama	0-0	Omiya Ardija	City Light Stadium	8,153
6	2015.04.05	Tokushima Vortis	1-2	Fagiano Okayama	Pocarisweat Stadium	5,086
7	2015.04.11	Júbilo Iwata	1-1	Fagiano Okayama	Yamaha Stadium	8,193
8	2015.04.19	Fagiano Okayama	3-0	Roasso Kumamoto	City Light Stadium	7,060
9	2015.04.26	Fagiano Okayama	0-1	Consadole Sapporo	City Light Stadium	10,107
10	2015.04.29	Mito HollyHock	1-0	Fagiano Okayama	Kasamatsu Stadium	4,471
11	2015.05.03	V-Varen Nagasaki	2-2	Fagiano Okayama	Nagasaki Stadium	3,389
12	2015.05.06	Fagiano Okayama	0-0	Tochigi SC	City Light Stadium	9,599
13	2015.05.09	Zweigen Kanazawa	1-1	Fagiano Okayama	Ishikawa Athletics Stadium	3,745
14	2015.05.17	Avispa Fukuoka	1-0	Fagiano Okayama	Level5 Stadium	5,018
15	2015.05.24	Fagiano Okayama	0-0	Yokohama FC	City Light Stadium	9,302
16	2015.05.31	Kamatamare Sanuki	0-1	Fagiano Okayama	Kagawa Marugame Stadium	6,556
17	2015.06.06	Fagiano Okayama	0-1	Tokyo Verdy	City Light Stadium	10,019
18	2015.06.14	Thespakusatsu Gunma	1-1	Fagiano Okayama	Shoda Shoyu Stadium Gunma	2,312
19	2015.06.21	Fagiano Okayama	1-2	Ehime FC	City Light Stadium	7,531
20	2015.06.28	Giravanz Kitakyushu	2-3	Fagiano Okayama	Honjo Stadium	3,504
21	2015.07.04	Fagiano Okayama	2-0	Kyoto Sanga FC	City Light Stadium	7,329
22	2015.07.08	Fagiano Okayama	1-1	V-Varen Nagasaki	City Light Stadium	6,408
23	2015.07.12	Omiya Ardija	3-0	Fagiano Okayama	NACK5 Stadium Omiya	10,077
24	2015.07.18	Fagiano Okayama	0-3	Tokushima Vortis	City Light Stadium	8,276
25	2015.07.22	Cerezo Osaka	2-1	Fagiano Okayama	Kincho Stadium	8,047
26	2015.07.26	Tochigi SC	2-2	Fagiano Okayama	Tochigi Green Stadium	5,395
27	2015.08.01	Fagiano Okayama	1-2	Júbilo Iwata	City Light Stadium	8,927
28	2015.08.08	Fagiano Okayama	0-1	Giravanz Kitakyushu	City Light Stadium	7,253
29	2015.08.15	Consadole Sapporo	0-0	Fagiano Okayama	Sapporo Dome	10,902
30	2015.08.23	Fagiano Okayama	1-0	Avispa Fukuoka	City Light Stadium	8,145
31	2015.09.13	Ehime FC	1-1	Fagiano Okayama	Ningineer Stadium	6,862
32	2015.09.20	Fagiano Okayama	3-0	Thespakusatsu Gunma	City Light Stadium	6,729
33	2015.09.23	Kyoto Sanga FC	0-0	Fagiano Okayama	Kyoto Nishikyogoku Athletic Stadium	7,349
34	2015.09.27	Fagiano Okayama	1-0	Oita Trinita	City Light Stadium	7,055
35	2015.10.04	Fagiano Okayama	3-0	Mito HollyHock	Tsuyama Stadium	4,346
36	2015.10.10	Tokyo Verdy	1-1	Fagiano Okayama	Ajinomoto Stadium	3,789
37	2015.10.18	Fagiano Okayama	0-0	Zweigen Kanazawa	City Light Stadium	7,095
38	2015.10.25	Yokohama FC	0-0	Fagiano Okayama	Ajinomoto Field Nishigaoka	2,568
39	2015.11.01	Fagiano Okayama	1-2	Kamatamare Sanuki	City Light Stadium	9,436
40	2015.11.08	FC Gifu	0-0	Fagiano Okayama	Gifu Nagaragawa Stadium	4,200
41	2015.11.14	Fagiano Okayama	1-0	JEF United Chiba	City Light Stadium	7,067
42	2015.11.23	Roasso Kumamoto	1-1	Fagiano Okayama	Umakana-Yokana Stadium	8,193
