= 2017 Fagiano Okayama season =

Fagiano Okayama
2017 season
- Manager: Tetsu Nagasawa
- Stadium: City Light Stadium
- J2 League: 13th

2017 Fagiano Okayama season.

== League table ==
Pos	Team	Pld	W	D	L	GF	GA	GD	Pts
11	Montedio Yamagata	42	14	17	11	45	47	−2	59
12	Kyoto Sanga	42	14	15	13	55	47	+8	57
13	Fagiano Okayama	42	13	16	13	44	49	−5	55
14	Mito HollyHock	42	14	12	16	45	48	−3	54
15	Ehime FC	42	14	9	19	54	68	−14	51

Updated to match(es) played on 28 November 2017. Source: 2017 MEIJI YASUDA J2 LEAGUE League table
Rules for classification: 1) Points; 2) Goal difference; 3) Goals scored

== J2 League ==
=== League table ===
Pos	Team	Pld	W	D	L	GF	GA	GD	Pts
12	Kyoto Sanga	42	14	15	13	55	47	+8	57
13	Fagiano Okayama	42	13	16	13	44	49	−5	55
14	Mito HollyHock	42	14	12	16	45	48	−3	54

Updated to match(es) played on 28 November 2017. Source: 2017 MEIJI YASUDA J2 LEAGUE League table
Rules for classification: 1) Points; 2) Goal difference; 3) Goals scored

=== Match details ===
J2 League match details
Match	Date	Team	Score	Team	Venue	Attendance
1	2017.02.26	Nagoya Grampus	2-0	Fagiano Okayama	Paloma Mizuho Stadium	18,918
2	2017.03.05	Fagiano Okayama	1-1	Roasso Kumamoto	City Light Stadium	10,286
3	2017.03.12	FC Machida Zelvia	1-1	Fagiano Okayama	Machida Stadium	4,205
4	2017.03.19	Fagiano Okayama	2-1	Kyoto Sanga FC	City Light Stadium	10,214
5	2017.03.26	Thespakusatsu Gunma	1-2	Fagiano Okayama	Shoda Shoyu Stadium Gunma	2,204
6	2017.04.02	Fagiano Okayama	0-1	Tokyo Verdy	City Light Stadium	8,551
7	2017.04.08	Fagiano Okayama	0-1	Zweigen Kanazawa	City Light Stadium	6,275
8	2017.04.16	Kamatamare Sanuki	1-1	Fagiano Okayama	Pikara Stadium	6,872
9	2017.04.23	Fagiano Okayama	2-1	Montedio Yamagata	City Light Stadium	8,104
10	2017.04.29	Fagiano Okayama	0-2	Shonan Bellmare	City Light Stadium	8,089
11	2017.05.03	V-Varen Nagasaki	3-0	Fagiano Okayama	Transcosmos Stadium Nagasaki	4,511
12	2017.05.07	Fagiano Okayama	3-2	Tokushima Vortis	City Light Stadium	8,931
13	2017.05.13	Avispa Fukuoka	1-0	Fagiano Okayama	Level5 Stadium	6,223
14	2017.05.17	Ehime FC	2-0	Fagiano Okayama	Ningineer Stadium	2,539
15	2017.05.21	Fagiano Okayama	2-1	Yokohama FC	City Light Stadium	8,650
16	2017.05.28	Oita Trinita	1-1	Fagiano Okayama	Oita Bank Dome	7,030
17	2017.06.03	Fagiano Okayama	2-1	JEF United Chiba	City Light Stadium	9,644
18	2017.06.11	Renofa Yamaguchi FC	0-1	Fagiano Okayama	Ishin Memorial Park Stadium	6,061
19	2017.06.17	Fagiano Okayama	1-1	FC Gifu	City Light Stadium	8,855
20	2017.06.25	Matsumoto Yamaga FC	1-1	Fagiano Okayama	Matsumotodaira Park Stadium	10,094
21	2017.07.01	Fagiano Okayama	3-0	Mito HollyHock	City Light Stadium	8,084
22	2017.07.09	Tokyo Verdy	1-1	Fagiano Okayama	Ajinomoto Stadium	5,765
23	2017.07.15	Zweigen Kanazawa	1-2	Fagiano Okayama	Ishikawa Athletics Stadium	4,293
24	2017.07.23	Fagiano Okayama	2-1	Renofa Yamaguchi FC	City Light Stadium	11,343
25	2017.07.30	Fagiano Okayama	2-0	V-Varen Nagasaki	City Light Stadium	10,938
26	2017.08.05	Kyoto Sanga FC	1-1	Fagiano Okayama	Kyoto Nishikyogoku Athletic Stadium	5,544
27	2017.08.11	FC Gifu	1-1	Fagiano Okayama	Gifu Nagaragawa Stadium	5,872
28	2017.08.16	Fagiano Okayama	0-1	Ehime FC	City Light Stadium	9,948
29	2017.08.20	Fagiano Okayama	0-0	Matsumoto Yamaga FC	City Light Stadium	10,373
30	2017.08.27	Roasso Kumamoto	0-1	Fagiano Okayama	Egao Kenko Stadium	4,517
31	2017.09.02	Montedio Yamagata	1-1	Fagiano Okayama	ND Soft Stadium Yamagata	5,215
32	2017.09.10	Fagiano Okayama	1-1	FC Machida Zelvia	City Light Stadium	8,546
33	2017.09.16	Tokushima Vortis	3-3	Fagiano Okayama	Pocarisweat Stadium	4,203
34	2017.09.23	Fagiano Okayama	0-1	Kamatamare Sanuki	City Light Stadium	10,578
35	2017.10.01	Fagiano Okayama	0-3	Oita Trinita	City Light Stadium	9,858
36	2017.10.07	JEF United Chiba	3-1	Fagiano Okayama	Fukuda Denshi Arena	8,708
37	2017.10.14	Mito HollyHock	1-0	Fagiano Okayama	K's denki Stadium Mito	3,502
38	2017.10.22	Fagiano Okayama	2-1	Thespakusatsu Gunma	City Light Stadium	9,436
39	2017.10.29	Shonan Bellmare	1-1	Fagiano Okayama	Shonan BMW Stadium Hiratsuka	8,780
40	2017.11.05	Fagiano Okayama	0-1	Nagoya Grampus	City Light Stadium	12,286
41	2017.11.12	Yokohama FC	1-1	Fagiano Okayama	NHK Spring Mitsuzawa Football Stadium	8,324
42	2017.11.19	Fagiano Okayama	1-1	Avispa Fukuoka	City Light Stadium	9,894
