= Tyron Ivanof =

Belgian footballer

Personal information
- Date of birth: 17 July 1997 (age 29)
- Place of birth: Belgium
- Height: 1.76 m (5 ft 9 1/2 in)
- Positions: Attacking midfielder; winger

Youth career
- –2009: Sint-Truidense
- 2009–2014: KRC Genk
- 2014–2015: Lille
- 2015–2017: Sint-Truidense

Senior career*
Years	Team	Apps	(Gls)
2017–2019	KV Kortrijk	11	(0)
2020	RWDM47	0	(0)
- * Club domestic league appearances and goals as of 23:00, 1 January 2021 (UTC)

Tyron Ivanof (born 17 July 1997) is a Belgian footballer who most recently played for RWDM47 in the Belgian First Amateur Division as an attacking midfielder or winger.

== Career ==
=== Club career ===
In 2009, Ivanof moved from the youth academy of Sint-Truidense to KRC Genk, where he ended up in the same age category as Leon Bailey, Bryan Heynen, Nordin Jackers and Dries Wouters, among others. However, Ivanof wasn't offered a professional contract by Genk, after which he moved to Lille OSC together with his brother Marvin in 2014. A year later he ended up at K.V. Kortrijk, where he signed his first professional contract two months before his twentieth birthday.

In the 2017/18 season, he was promoted in to the first team of Kortrijk. His debut in the Belgien First Division A came on 29 April 2017 in a game against KRC Genk, where he replaced Stijn De Smet in the 67th minute. The game finished 3–0. Partly due to a serious knee injury, he played only eleven official games for Kortrijk, including nine in Play-off games.

Ivanof moved to RWDM47 on 1 February 2020. He left the club at the end of the season.
