= 2016 Fagiano Okayama season =

Fagiano Okayama
2016 season
- Manager: Tetsu Nagasawa
- Stadium: City Light Stadium
- J2 League: 6th

2016 Fagiano Okayama season.

== J2 League ==
=== League table ===
Pos	Team	Pld	W	D	L	GF	GA	GD	Pts	Promotion, qualification or relegation
4	Cerezo Osaka (O, P)	42	23	9	10	62	46	+16	78	Qualification for promotion playoffs (Note: Only teams that meet J1 license criteria can participate in promotion playoffs. If one or more teams fail to meet the criteria, only eligible teams that finished 3rd to 6th will participate and no replacement teams will be added.)
5	Kyoto Sanga	42	18	15	9	50	37	+13	69	Qualification for promotion playoffs
6	Fagiano Okayama	42	17	14	11	58	44	+14	65	Qualification for promotion playoffs
7	Machida Zelvia	42	18	11	13	53	44	+9	65	
8	Yokohama FC	42	16	11	15	50	51	−1	59	

Updated to match(es) played on 20 November 2016. Source: 2016 MEIJI YASUDA J2 LEAGUE League table
Rules for classification: 1) Points; 2) Goal difference; 3) Goals scored
(O) Play-off winners; (P) Promoted

=== Match details ===
J2 League match details
Match	Date	Team	Score	Team	Venue	Attendance
1	2016.02.28	Renofa Yamaguchi FC	1-1	Fagiano Okayama	Ishin Memorial Park Stadium	11,308
2	2016.03.06	Fagiano Okayama	2-1	JEF United Chiba	City Light Stadium	9,288
3	2016.03.13	Fagiano Okayama	2-2	Kyoto Sanga FC	City Light Stadium	9,098
4	2016.03.20	Mito HollyHock	2-3	Fagiano Okayama	K's denki Stadium Mito	5,193
5	2016.03.26	Fagiano Okayama	2-0	Giravanz Kitakyushu	City Light Stadium	7,050
6	2016.04.03	Fagiano Okayama	1-1	Tokyo Verdy	City Light Stadium	7,184
7	2016.04.09	Hokkaido Consadole Sapporo	1-0	Fagiano Okayama	Sapporo Dome	9,467
8	2016.04.16	Thespakusatsu Gunma	0-1	Fagiano Okayama	Shoda Shoyu Stadium Gunma	2,641
9	2016.04.23	Fagiano Okayama	0-1	Montedio Yamagata	City Light Stadium	8,256
10	2016.04.29	Fagiano Okayama	2-2	FC Machida Zelvia	City Light Stadium	9,170
11	2016.05.03	Yokohama FC	0-2	Fagiano Okayama	Nissan Stadium	5,561
12	2016.05.07	V-Varen Nagasaki	0-3	Fagiano Okayama	Nagasaki Stadium	3,564
13	2016.05.15	Fagiano Okayama	0-1	FC Gifu	City Light Stadium	9,464
14	2016.05.22	Fagiano Okayama	2-1	Ehime FC	City Light Stadium	8,486
15	2016.05.28	Cerezo Osaka	2-1	Fagiano Okayama	Yanmar Stadium Nagai	13,774
16	2016.06.04	Fagiano Okayama	2-1	Roasso Kumamoto	City Light Stadium	7,308
17	2016.06.08	Tokushima Vortis	2-3	Fagiano Okayama	Pocarisweat Stadium	3,218
18	2016.06.12	Fagiano Okayama	2-1	Matsumoto Yamaga FC	City Light Stadium	8,193
19	2016.06.20	Zweigen Kanazawa	1-1	Fagiano Okayama	Ishikawa Athletics Stadium	2,418
20	2016.06.26	Kamatamare Sanuki	0-1	Fagiano Okayama	Pikara Stadium	6,716
21	2016.07.03	Fagiano Okayama	2-2	Shimizu S-Pulse	City Light Stadium	11,090
22	2016.07.10	Tokyo Verdy	2-1	Fagiano Okayama	Ajinomoto Stadium	4,944
23	2016.07.16	Fagiano Okayama	0-0	Hokkaido Consadole Sapporo	City Light Stadium	13,304
24	2016.07.20	Fagiano Okayama	0-1	Yokohama FC	City Light Stadium	10,753
25	2016.07.24	Montedio Yamagata	0-1	Fagiano Okayama	ND Soft Stadium Yamagata	5,312
26	2016.07.31	Giravanz Kitakyushu	1-3	Fagiano Okayama	Honjo Stadium	3,575
27	2016.08.07	Fagiano Okayama	1-0	Tokushima Vortis	City Light Stadium	10,443
28	2016.08.11	Ehime FC	1-1	Fagiano Okayama	Ningineer Stadium	5,747
29	2016.08.14	Fagiano Okayama	3-1	Kamatamare Sanuki	City Light Stadium	12,233
30	2016.08.21	JEF United Chiba	2-0	Fagiano Okayama	Fukuda Denshi Arena	10,109
31	2016.09.11	Fagiano Okayama	1-0	Renofa Yamaguchi FC	City Light Stadium	11,225
32	2016.09.18	Roasso Kumamoto	0-0	Fagiano Okayama	Umakana-Yokana Stadium	4,404
33	2016.09.25	Fagiano Okayama	0-0	V-Varen Nagasaki	City Light Stadium	8,165
34	2016.10.02	FC Gifu	0-5	Fagiano Okayama	Gifu Nagaragawa Stadium	5,250
35	2016.10.08	Matsumoto Yamaga FC	1-1	Fagiano Okayama	Matsumotodaira Park Stadium	12,648
36	2016.10.16	Fagiano Okayama	1-1	Cerezo Osaka	City Light Stadium	15,203
37	2016.10.23	Fagiano Okayama	1-2	Zweigen Kanazawa	City Light Stadium	10,031
38	2016.10.30	Kyoto Sanga FC	2-0	Fagiano Okayama	Kyoto Nishikyogoku Athletic Stadium	8,714
39	2016.11.03	FC Machida Zelvia	1-1	Fagiano Okayama	Machida Stadium	4,163
40	2016.11.06	Fagiano Okayama	1-2	Mito HollyHock	City Light Stadium	9,216
41	2016.11.12	Shimizu S-Pulse	2-1	Fagiano Okayama	IAI Stadium Nihondaira	16,740
42	2016.11.20	Fagiano Okayama	3-3	Thespakusatsu Gunma	City Light Stadium	15,204
