= Jonas Van Kerckhoven =

Belgian footballer

Personal information
- Date of birth: 4 February 1994 (age 32)
- Place of birth: Bornem, Belgium
- Height: 1.80 m (5 ft 11 in)
- Position: Defensive midfielder

Team information
- Current team: Royal Cappellen
- Number: 5

Youth career
- –2012: Club Brugge
- 2012–2013: Willem II

Senior career*
Years	Team	Apps	(Gls)
2013	Willem II	2	(0)
2013–2014	Oudenaarde	26	(2)
2014–2015	Sportkring Sint-Niklaas	3	(0)
2015–2016	Eendracht Zele	29	(1)
2016–2017	Eendracht Aalst	14	(0)
2017–2019	KSV Temse	58	(5)
2019–	Royal Cappellen	74	(3)

International career
2009	Belgium U15	3	(1)
2009	Belgium U16	3	(0)
- * Club domestic league appearances and goals as of 16 August 2023

Jonas Van Kerckhoven (born 4 February 1994) is a Belgian footballer who plays as a defensive midfielder for Royal Cappellen.
