= Laurens Symons =

Belgian footballer (born 2001)

Personal information
- Full name: Laurens Willy Symons
- Date of birth: 28 August 2001 (age 25)
- Place of birth: Brasschaat, Belgium
- Height: 1.84 m (6 ft 0 in)
- Position: Forward

Team information
- Current team: Lyra-Lierse
- Number: 9

Youth career
- Lierse
- 2015–2018: Lokeren

Senior career*
Years	Team	Apps	(Gls)
2018–2020	Lokeren	3	(0)
2020–2022	Mechelen	0	(0)
2021	→ Grindavík (loan)	13	(3)
2022	→ Lokeren-Temse (loan)	13	(4)
2022–2023	Cappellen	32	(15)
2023–2024	Thes	30	(13)
2024–2025	Cappellen	28	(12)
2025–	Lyra-Lierse	22	(4)

International career
2017	Belgium U17	3	(1)
2018–2019	Belgium U18	6	(2)
2019	Belgium U19	3	(0)
- * Club domestic league appearances and goals as of 3 May 2026

Laurens Willy Symons (born 28 August 2001) is a Belgian professional footballer who plays as a forward for Belgian club Lyra-Lierse.

== Club career ==
On 5 February 2018, Symons signed his first professional contract with Lokeren, having joined their youth academy in 2015. Symons made his professional debut for Lokeren in a 2–1 Belgian First Division A loss to Waasland-Beveren on 22 December 2018.

On 29 January 2020, Symons moved to Mechelen on a deal until June 2022 with an option for one further year. 18-year old Symons was registered for the club's reserve team.

In May 2021, he was sent on loan to Icelandic second division club Grindavík for the rest of the year.
