= Guillaume De Schryver =

Belgian footballer

Personal information
- Full name: Guillaume Luc De Schryver
- Date of birth: 4 November 1996 (age 30)
- Place of birth: Ostend, Belgium
- Height: 1.82 m (5 ft 11 1/2 in)
- Position: Midfielder

Team information
- Current team: Beveren
- Number: 10

Youth career
- 2003–2010: Club Brugge
- 2010–2011: Standard Liège
- 2011–2012: Club Brugge
- 2012–2016: Cercle Brugge

Senior career*
Years	Team	Apps	(Gls)
2016–2018	Cercle Brugge	12	(0)
2018–2020	Westerlo	37	(0)
2021–2023	Lierse Kempenzonen	57	(7)
2023–2024	Deinze	34	(7)
2025–	Beveren	29	(2)
- * Club domestic league appearances and goals as of 19 April 2026

Guillaume Luc De Schryver (born 4 November 1996) is a Belgian footballer who plays for Beveren in the Challenger Pro League as a centre midfielder.

== Club career ==
Guillaume De Schryver started his career with Cercle Brugge.

On 3 May 2021, he joined Lierse Kempenzonen on a one-year contract.

On 8 August 2023, De Schryver signed a two-year contract with Deinze.

On 17 January 2025, De Schryver joined SK Beveren, after Deinze went bankrupt. He signed a contract for one and a half seasons with an option.
