= Flavio Ciampichetti =

Argentine footballer (born 1988)

Personal information
- Full name: Flavio Germán Ciampichetti
- Date of birth: 7 March 1988 (age 38)
- Place of birth: Pergamino, Argentina
- Height: 1.86 m (6 ft 1 in)
- Position: Forward

Team information
- Current team: San Nicolas de los Arroyos

Senior career*
Years	Team	Apps	(Gls)
2009–2010	Defensores de Belgrano		
2010	Douglas Haig		
2011	La Emilia		
2011–2014	Defensores de Belgrano	43	(20)
2014–2015	Quilmes	0	(0)
2015–2016	Guillermo Brown	38	(13)
2016–2019	Antofagasta	76	(24)
2019	Macará	10	(2)
2019–2020	Eupen	15	(0)
2020–2021	Cultural Leonesa	5	(0)
2021–2022	Puerto Montt	16	(2)
2022–2024	Guillermo Brown	23	(2)
2024–Act	San Nicolas de los Arroyos	23	(1)
- * Club domestic league appearances and goals as of 20:46, 24 July 2022 (UTC)

Flavio Germán Ciampichetti (born 7 March 1988) is an Argentine professional footballer who plays as a forward for Primera Nacional club Guillermo Brown.

== Club career ==
On 28 June 2019, he signed a one-year contract with an extension option with the Belgian First Division A club Eupen. On 21 September 2020, Ciampichetti agreed a one-season deal with Spanish third-tier team Cultural Leonesa.

In August 2021, Ciampichetti signed with Chilean club Deportes Puerto Montt. In January 2022, he returned to his former club Guillermo Brown, competing in the second division of Argentina.

== Career statistics ==
=== Club ===
As of match played 14 March 2021

Appearances and goals by club, season and competition
Club	Season	League			National Cup		Continental		Total	
Club	Season	Division	Apps	Goals	Apps	Goals	Apps	Goals	Apps	Goals
Defensores de Belgrano	2012–13	Torneo Argentino A	12	6	1	0	—		13	6
Defensores de Belgrano	2013–14	Torneo Argentino A	31	14	1	0	—		32	14
Defensores de Belgrano	Total		43	20	2	0	0	0	45	20
Quilmes	2014	Argentine Primera División	0	0	0	0	—		0	0
Guillermo Brown	2015	Primera B Nacional	38	13	0	0	—		38	13
Deportes Antofagasta	2015–16	Chilean Primera División	13	7	0	0	—		13	7
Deportes Antofagasta	2016–17	Chilean Primera División	28	8	2	0	—		30	8
Deportes Antofagasta	2017	Chilean Primera División	11	4	5	1	—		16	5
Deportes Antofagasta	2018	Chilean Primera División	24	5	2	1	—		26	6
Deportes Antofagasta	Total		76	24	9	2	0	0	85	26
Macará	2019	Ecuadorian Serie A	10	2	—		3 (Note: Appearance(s) in Copa Sudamericana)	1	13	3
Eupen	2019–20	Belgian First Division A	14	0	1	0	—		15	0
Cultural y Deportiva Leonesa	2020–21	Segunda División B	3	0	1	0	—		4	0
Career total			184	59	13	2	3	1	200	62
