= Stallone Limbombe =

Belgian footballer

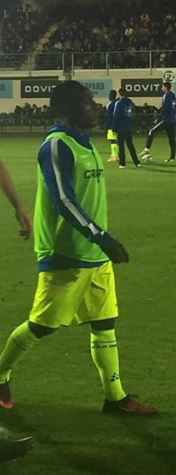

Personal information
- Full name: Stallone Limbombe Ekango
- Date of birth: 26 March 1991 (age 35)
- Place of birth: Mechelen, Belgium
- Height: 1.71 m (5 ft 7 in)
- Position: Winger

Team information
- Current team: Royal Cappellen
- Number: 30

Youth career
- Genk
- –2011: Gent
- 2010–2011: PSV

Senior career*
Years	Team	Apps	(Gls)
2011–2013	Cultural Leonesa	37	(2)
2013–2014	Oosterwijk	20	(0)
2014–2018	Antwerp	68	(14)
2018–2019	Gent	24	(4)
2019	→ Giresunspor (loan)	7	(0)
2020–2021	OH Leuven	1	(0)
2021–2022	Lierse Kempenzonen	25	(4)
2022	Nea Salamis	7	(0)
2023–2024	Othellos Athienou	20	(2)
2024	Patro Eisden	2	(0)
2024	Nea Ionia		
2025–	Royal Cappellen	8	(1)
- * Club domestic league appearances and goals as of 7 May 2025

Stallone Limbombe (born 26 March 1991) is a Belgian professional footballer who plays as a winger for Royal Cappellen.

== International career ==
Born in Belgium and of Congolese descent, Limbombe was called up to represent the DR Congo national football team in 2011.

== Personal life ==
Stallone is the older brother of the footballers Bryan, Anthony and Maxime Limbombe.
