= Nils Schouterden =

Belgian footballer

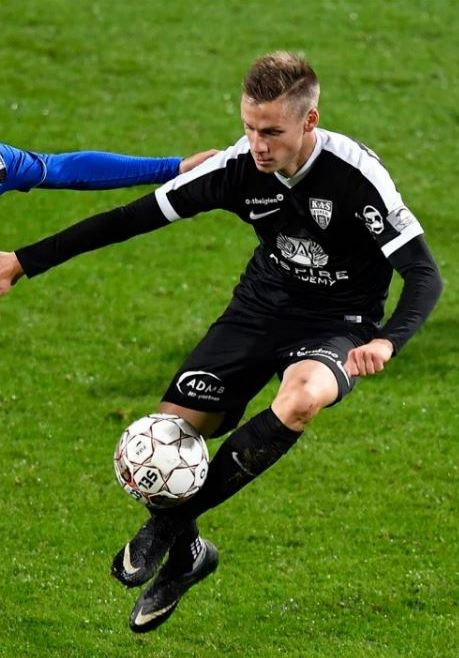
- Schouterden in 2017

Personal information
- Full name: Nils Herman Schouterden
- Date of birth: 14 December 1988 (age 37)
- Place of birth: Bonheiden, Belgium
- Height: 1.76 m (5 ft 9 in)
- Position: Winger

Youth career
- 1994–2000: HO Veltem
- 2000–2002: Zwarte Duivels Oud-Heverlee
- 2002–2006: OH Leuven

Senior career*
Years	Team	Apps	(Gls)
2006–2009	OH Leuven	55	(6)
2009–2013	Sint-Truiden	108	(13)
2013–2014	Eupen	34	(16)
2014–2016	Westerlo	44	(7)
2016–2017	Mechelen	29	(2)
2017–2020	Eupen	78	(2)
2021	AEK Larnaca	8	(0)
2021–2024	Lierse Kempenzonen	80	(7)
2024–2025	Seraing	25	(1)

International career
2007	Belgium U-19	2	(0)
- * Club domestic league appearances and goals

Nils Herman Schouterden (born 14 December 1988) is a Belgian former football player.
