= Hotman El Kababri =

Belgian footballer

Personal information
- Date of birth: 24 January 2000 (age 26)
- Place of birth: Eupen, Belgium
- Height: 1.70 m (5 ft 7 in)
- Positions: Right-back; midfielder

Team information
- Current team: RE Acren-Lessines
- Number: 18

Senior career*
Years	Team	Apps	(Gls)
2019–2020	Anderlecht	1	(0)
2020–2021	Zulte Waregem		
2020	→ Lierse (loan)	0	(0)
2023	Zakynthos		
2025–	RE Acren-Lessines	0	(0)

International career
2014–2015	Belgium U15	6	(1)
2016	Morocco U17	1	(0)
- * Club domestic league appearances and goals as of 16 January 2026

Hotman El Kababri (Arabic: عثمان الكبابري; born 27 October 2000) is a professional footballer who plays as a right back for RE Acren-Lessines. Born in Belgium, El Kababri represents Morocco internationally.

== Professional career ==
El Kababri made his professional debut for Anderlecht in a 1-2 Belgian First Division A defeat against K.V. Oostende on 28 July 2019.

== International career ==
Born in Belgium, El Kababri is of Moroccan descent. He represented the Morocco U17s in 2016.
