= Royal Cappellen FC =

Belgian football club

Cappellen
- Full name: Royal Cappellen Football Club
- Short name: Cappellen
- Founded: 1906; 120 years ago
- Ground: Stadion Jos Van Wellen, Kapellen
- Capacity: 3,506
- Chairman: Carlo van Acker
- Manager: Bart De Roover
- League: Belgian Division 2
- 2025–26: Belgian Division 2 VV B, 13th of 16
- Website: www.rcfc.be
Home colours	Away colours

Royal Cappellen Football Club is a Belgian football club from the town of Kapellen, near Antwerp. Cappellen has matricule number 43 and has yellow and red as main team colours. The club has a long history in the higher divisions of Belgian football. In the latter part of the 1960s the club dropped for a long time into the provincial leagues, however in the early 1990s it managed to climb back into Promotion.

== History ==
The club Cappellen Football Club was founded in 1906 by a few youngsters who were not able to play with Victoria FC, at that time the only team in town. Soon they got the club officially registered. For the first few years the team played in the provincial leagues, but when in 1926 the national level of football in Belgium was extended with a third division, Cappellen got auto-promoted and thus managed to play on a national level for the first time.

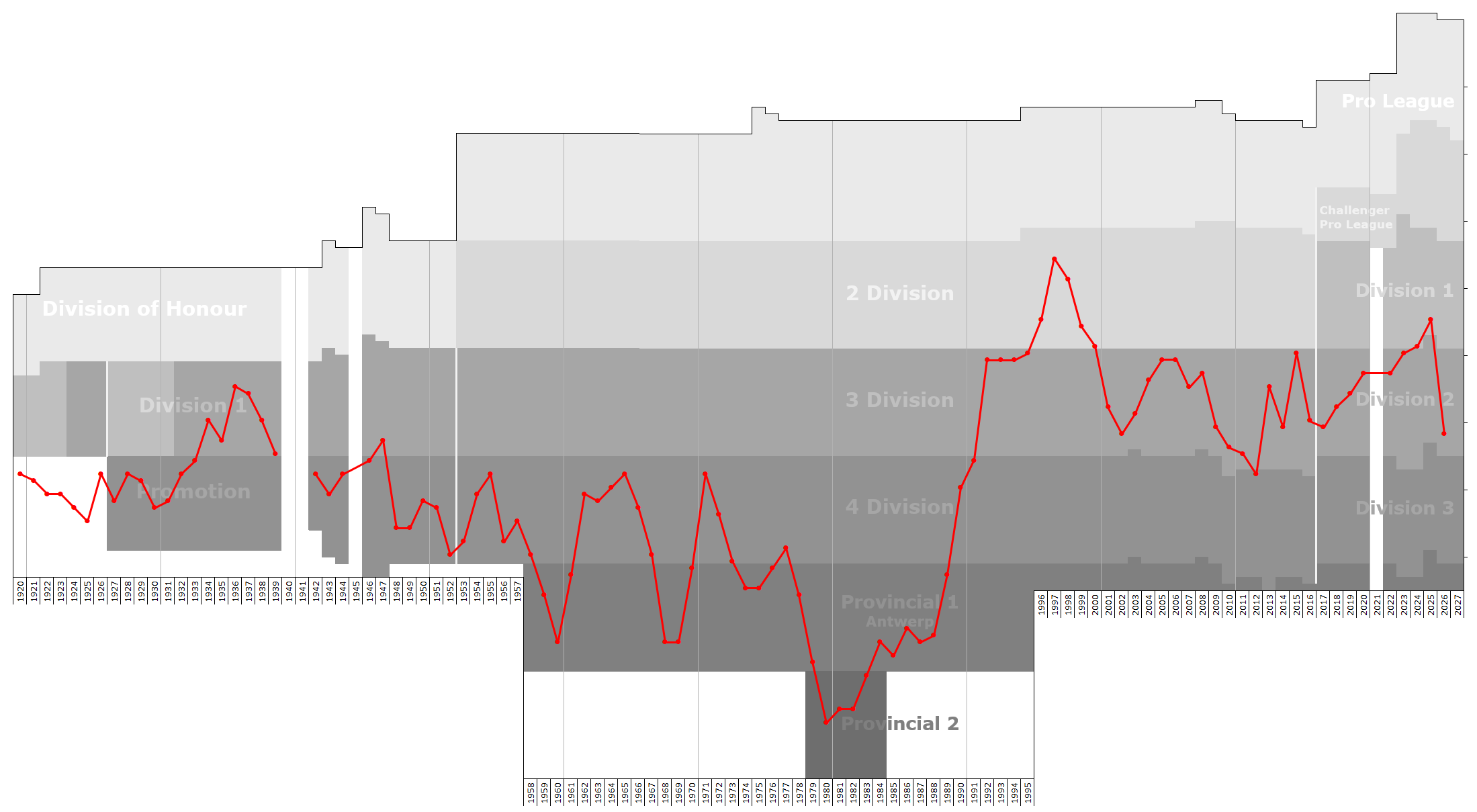
Historical chart of Cappellen FC league performance

Cappellen was able to keep up with the pace and even managed to end in the top few several times, ultimately leading to the team attaining promotion into the second division at the end of the 1932 season. Again Cappellen seemed to have few trouble in scoring points and in the 1935–36 season they even ended in fourth position, just two points away from direct promotion into the highest division. However just before the second world war, Capellen got demoted into third division again.

After the war Cappellen managed to climb back into second division during the 1946 season, but they immediately dropped back into third that season. In 1952, the structure of the Belgian league was altered to lower the number of teams in the higher divisions and to introduce a fourth national level, Cappellen remained in the promotion-division, but this was now fourth instead of third national level. The club never managed to regain promotion into third level and eventually it even dropped into the provincial leagues again in 1958. From 1961 until 1967 the team spent a few seasons in the promotion division again, but then sunk deep into the provincial leagues for many years.

It was only in 1989 that Cappellen managed to re-enter at national level the promotion division which was rapidly followed by another promotion in 1991 to the third division. Even there Cappellen showed some good results as they ended in second position for three consecutive seasons. In 1995 however they finally managed to win the division and as such the team was promoted into the second division, exactly half a century after they last played at that level.

Since 2000, Cappellen is playing in the third division again, with varying results.

In 2022–23, Cappellen secure promotion to Belgian National Division 1 after defeating KV Mechelen II narrowly 1–0 with a goal in minute 27 Idriss Diawara on final day in Matchweek 34 on 14 May 2023.

== Current squad ==
As of 1 March 2025.

Note: Flags indicate national team as defined under FIFA eligibility rules; some limited exceptions apply. Players may hold more than one non-FIFA nationality.

No.	Pos.	Nation	Player
1	GK	BEL	Simon Van Brussel
2	DF	BEL	Elliot Cranshoff
5	DF	BEL	Glenn Van Den Bogaert
6	DF	BEL	Arno De Kuyffer
7	MF	BEL	Nando Nöstlinger
8	MF	BEL	Siemen Cloots
10	FW	BEL	Thomas Van Zantvoort
11	FW	BEL	Mamadou Diallo
12	DF	BEL	David De Schutter
14	DF	BEL	Seppe Somers
15	FW	BEL	Elano Da Silva
16	MF	BEL	Jayden Achten

No.	Pos.	Nation	Player
17	MF	BEL	Bilal Talal
18	MF	BEL	Robbe Kil
19	FW	BEL	Felix Minnebach
20	DF	BEL	Strahinja Ristovic
21	GK	BEL	Joppe Van Den Broek
23	MF	BEL	Idriss Diawara
24	MF	BEL	Jasper Stevens
29	DF	BEL	Haroun Sylla
30	FW	BEL	Stallone Limbombe
36	FW	BEL	Laurens Symons
43	GK	BEL	Kyan Verpoest

== Honours ==
- Belgian Division 2
  - Winner (1): 2022–23
