= JFE Harenokuni Stadium =

Stadium in Okayama, Japan

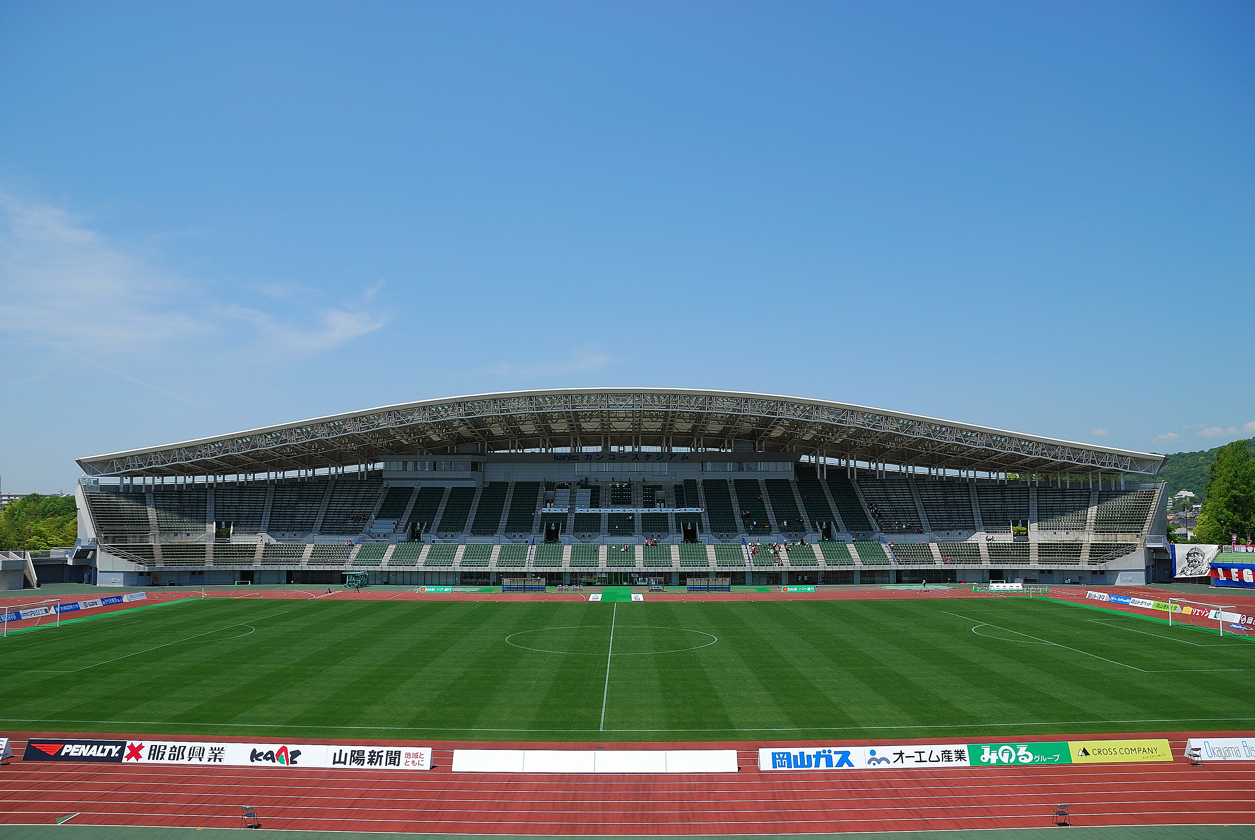
- Interactive map of JFE Harenokuni Stadium
- Former names: Okayama Stadium (1957–2010); Kanko Stadium (2010–2015); City Light Stadium (2016-2024)
- Location: Okayama, Japan
- Coordinates: 34°40′51″N 133°55′10″E
- Owner: Okayama Prefecture
- Capacity: 15,479
- Surface: Grass
- Scoreboard: Toshiba Super Colour Vision
- Field size: 106 x 72 m

Construction
- Opened: 1957
- Renovated: 2003

Tenant
- Fagiano Okayama

The JFE Harenokuni Stadium (ＪＦＥ晴れの国スタジアム, ＪＦＥ Hare no Kuni Sutajiamu), known from 2010 to February 2015 as Kanko Stadium (Kankoスタジアム, Kankō Sutajiamu), as well as City Light Stadium (シティライトスタジアム, Shiti Raito Sutajiamu) from 2016 to 2024, and before that as Okayama Combined Ground Athletic Stadium (岡山県総合グラウンド陸上競技場, Okayama-ken Sōgō Guraundo Rikujō Kyōgijō) is a multi-purpose stadium in Okayama, Japan. It is currently used mostly for football matches and athletics events. It is the home field of Fagiano Okayama, and used for some rugby union Top League games. The stadium's capacity is 15,479. Before the naming rights were acquired by Kanko and then City Light, the venue's nickname was Momotaro Stadium (桃太郎スタジアム, Momotarō Sutajiamu)".
