= 2021–22 Royal Antwerp FC season =

Antwerp
2021–22 season
- Owner: Paul Gheysens
- Chairman: Paul Gheysens
- Manager: Brian Priske
- Stadium: Bosuilstadion
- First Division A: 4th
- Belgian Cup: Sixth round
- UEFA Europa League: Group stage
- Top goalscorer: League: Michael Frey (24); All: Michael Frey (24)
Home colours	Away colours	Third colours
- All statistics correct as of 23 January 2022.

The 2021–22 season was the 118th season in the existence of Royal Antwerp F.C. and the club's fifth consecutive season in the top flight of Belgian football. In addition to the domestic league, Antwerp participated in this season's editions of the Belgian Cup and the UEFA Europa League.

== Players ==
=== First-team squad ===
As of 31 August 2021

Note: Flags indicate national team as defined under FIFA eligibility rules; some limited exceptions apply. Players may hold more than one non-FIFA nationality.

No.	Pos.	Nation	Player
1	GK	FRA	Jean Butez
2	DF	BEL	Ritchie De Laet
3	DF	BEL	Björn Engels
4	MF	BEL	Radja Nainggolan
5	DF	POR	Aurélio Buta
6	MF	BEL	Birger Verstraete
7	FW	DEN	Viktor Fischer
8	MF	NGR	Alhassan Yusuf
9	FW	GER	Johannes Eggestein
10	MF	BEL	Michel-Ange Balikwisha
11	MF	COD	Nill De Pauw
12	DF	COD	Luete Ava Dongo
14	MF	BEL	Manuel Benson
16	MF	BEL	Pieter Gerkens
18	DF	FRA	Yassine Ben Hamed
19	MF	JPN	Koji Miyoshi
21	DF	USA	Sam Vines

No.	Pos.	Nation	Player
22	FW	ANG	Bruny Nsimba
24	DF	BEL	Dorian Dessoleil
23	MF	GHA	Opoku Ampomah (on loan from Fortuna Düsseldorf)
26	GK	BEL	Ortwin De Wolf
30	DF	SEN	Abdoulaye Seck
34	MF	BEL	Jelle Bataille
38	MF	BEL	Faris Haroun (Captain)
43	MF	BEL	Sander Coopman
44	FW	NED	Emanuel Emegha
51	DF	ECU	Willian Pacho
61	DF	POR	Dinis Almeida
70	MF	TAN	Mbwana Samatta (on loan from Fenerbahçe)
71	GK	CRO	Davor Matijaš
80	MF	BEL	Pierre Dwomoh
90	FW	CAN	Jules-Anthony Vilsaint
99	FW	SUI	Michael Frey

=== Out on loan ===
Note: Flags indicate national team as defined under FIFA eligibility rules; some limited exceptions apply. Players may hold more than one non-FIFA nationality.

No.	Pos.	Nation	Player
1	GK	IRI	Alireza Beiranvand (at Boavista)
7	FW	CMR	Didier Lamkel Zé (at DAC Dunajská Streda)
9	FW	CGO	Guy Mbenza (at Wydad AC)
15	MF	CMR	Frank Boya (at Zulte Waregem)

No.	Pos.	Nation	Player
18	MF	CMR	Martin Hongla (at Hellas Verona)
25	MF	BEL	Alexis De Sart (at Oud-Heverlee Leuven)
40	DF	NGR	Junior Pius (at Sint-Truidense)

== Transfers ==
=== In ===
Date	Pos.	Player	From	Fee	Source
17 June 2021	FW	(Switzerland) Michael Frey	(Turkey) Fenerbahçe	Undisclosed	
18 June 2021	DF	(Belgium) Björn Engels	(England) Aston Villa	Undisclosed	
7 July 2021	DF	(France) Yassine Ben Hamed	(France) Lille	Undisclosed	
15 July 2021	DF	(United States) Sam Vines	(United States) Colorado Rapids	Undisclosed	
16 July 2021	MF	(Nigeria) Alhassan Yusuf	(Sweden) Göteborg	Undisclosed	
30 July 2021	FW	(Denmark) Viktor Fischer	(Denmark) Copenhagen	Undisclosed	
5 August 2021	FW	(Germany) Johannes Eggestein	(Germany) Werder Bremen	Undisclosed	
14 August 2021	MF	(Belgium) Radja Nainggolan	(Italy) Inter Milan (Note: Contract with Inter Milan terminated by mutual consent. On 14 August 2021, Nainggolan joined Royal Antwerp as a free agent.)	Free transfer	
27 August 2021	MF	(Belgium) Pierre Dwomoh	(Belgium) K.R.C. Genk	Undisclosed	
27 August 2021	DF	(Belgium) Dorian Dessoleil	(Belgium) R. Charleroi S.C.	Undisclosed	
31 August 2021	FW	(Tanzania) Mbwana Samatta	(Turkey) Fenerbahçe	On loan	
28 January 2022	DF	(Ecuador) Willian Pacho	(Ecuador) Independiente del Valle	Undisclosed	
31 January 2022	FW	(Netherlands) Emanuel Emegha	(Netherlands) Sparta Rotterdam	Undisclosed	

=== Out ===
Date	Pos.	Player	To	Fee	Source
1 July 2021	DF	(Norway) Simen Juklerød	(Belgium) K.R.C. Genk	Free transfer	
1 July 2021	MF	(Israel) Lior Refaelov	(Belgium) Anderlecht	Free transfer	
12 July 2021	FW	(Democratic Republic of the Congo) Dieumerci Mbokani	Kuwait SC	Free transfer	
23 July 2021	DF	(France) (Republic of the Congo) Dylan Batubinsika	(Portugal) F.C. Famalicão	Undisclosed	
31 August 2021	MF	(Belgium) Louis Verstraete	(Belgium) Waasland-Beveren	Undisclosed	
2 December 2021	FW	(Democratic Republic of the Congo) Jonathan Bolingi	(Thailand) Buriram United F.C.	Undisclosed	
27 January 2022	DF	(Belgium) Robbe Quirynen	(Belgium) K.M.S.K. Deinze	Undisclosed	

== Pre-season and friendlies ==
Win Draw Loss Fixtures

3 July 2021 Friendly	Antwerp (Belgium)	2–2	(Netherlands) FC Utrecht	Antwerp, Belgium
14:00 CEST (UTC+2)	De Laet 48'; Mbenza 65' (pen.)		Gustafson (yellow card); Van der Maarel (yellow card); Dalmau (yellow card); Kerk 80'; Boussaid 107'	Stadium: Bosuilstadion
Note: The match was played in two halves of 60 minutes each.

17 July 2021 Friendly	Antwerp (Belgium)	0–0	(France) Monaco	Antwerp, Belgium
17:00 CEST (UTC+2)				Stadium: Bosuilstadion

== Competitions ==
=== Overall record ===
Competition	First match	Last match	Starting round	Final position	Record							
Competition	First match	Last match	Starting round	Final position	Pld	W	D	L	GF	GA	GD	Win %
Belgian First Division A	25 July 2021	May 2022	Matchday 1		34	19	6	9	55	38	+17	55.88
Belgian Cup	28 October 2021		Sixth round	Sixth round	1	0	0	1	1	2	−1	0.00
UEFA Europa League	19 August 2021	9 December 2021	Play-off round	Group stage	8	1	3	4	10	14	−4	12.50
Total					43	20	9	14	66	54	+12	46.51

Last updated: 9 April 2022
Source: Soccerway

=== First Division A ===
==== League table ====
Pos	Team	Pld	W	D	L	GF	GA	GD	Pts	Qualification or relegation
2	Club Brugge (C)	34	21	9	4	72	37	+35	72	Qualification for the Play-offs I
3	Anderlecht	34	18	10	6	72	36	+36	64	Qualification for the Play-offs I
4	Antwerp	34	19	6	9	55	38	+17	63	Qualification for the Play-offs I
5	Gent	34	18	8	8	56	30	+26	62	Qualification for the Play-offs II
6	Charleroi	34	15	9	10	55	46	+9	54	Qualification for the Play-offs II

Source: Jupiler Pro League (in Dutch), Soccerway
Rules for classification: 1) Points; 2) Matches won; 3) Goal difference; 4) Goals scored; 5) Away matches won; 6) Away goal difference; 7) Away goals scored; 8) Play-off.
(C) Champions

==== Results summary ====
Overall								Home						Away					
Pld	W	D	L	GF	GA	GD	Pts	W	D	L	GF	GA	GD	W	D	L	GF	GA	GD
34	19	6	9	55	38	+17	63	9	4	4	30	19	+11	10	2	5	25	19	+6

Last updated: 9 April 2022.
Source: Jupiler Pro League

==== Results by round ====
Round	1	2	3	4	5	6	7	8	9	10	11	12	13	14	15	16	17	18	19	20	21	22	23	24	25	26	27	28	29	30	31	32	33	34
Ground	A	H	A	A	H	H	A	H	A	H	A	H	A	H	A	H	A	H	H	A	A	H	A	H	A	H	A	H	A	H	A	H	A	H
Result	L	L	W	D	W	D	W	W	W	W	L	D	W	W	L	W	W	L	W	D	W	W	W	D	W	L	W	L	L	W	L	W	W	D
Position	14	18	13	11	4	15	12	10	4	2	4	3	3	2	2	2	2	3	3	3	3	3	3	2	2	2	2	3	3	3	4	3	3	4

Updated to match(es) played on 9 April 2022. Source: Jupiler Pro League
A = Away; H = Home; W = Win; D = Draw; L = Loss

==== Matches ====
The league fixtures were announced on 8 June 2021.

25 July 2021 1	KV Mechelen	3–2	Antwerp	Mechelen
13:30 CEST (UTC+2)	De Laet 60' (o.g.); Walsh (yellow card) 66'; Druijf 73', 74'; Schoofs (yellow card) 76'	Report	Frey 18'; Benson 56'; B. Verstraete (yellow card) 79'; Bataille (yellow card) 90+3'	Stadium: Achter de Kazerne; Attendance: 4,800; Referee: Nicolas Laforge

1 August 2021 2	Antwerp	0–1	Kortrijk	Antwerp
21:00 CEST (UTC+2)	L. Verstraete (yellow card) 25'; Soussi (yellow card) 90+2'	Report	Palaversa (yellow card) 13'; D'haene (yellow card) 19'; Rougeaux (yellow card) 32'; Selemani (yellow card) 60', (goal) 87'; Guèye (yellow card) 76'	Stadium: Bosuilstadion; Attendance: 5,000; Referee: Erik Lambrechts

8 August 2021 3	Standard Liège	2–5	Antwerp	Liège
13:30 CEST (UTC+2)	Sissako (yellow card) 39'; Bastien (yellow card) 49'; Muleka 55'; Drăguș 77'; Pavlovic (yellow card) 80'	Report	Frey 6', 37', 59', 61', 68'; Seck (yellow card) 8'; Benson (yellow card) 44'; De Laet (yellow card) 79'; B. Verstraete (yellow card) 80'; Gerkens (yellow card) 90+1'	Stadium: Stade Maurice Dufrasne; Attendance: 8,038; Referee: Bram Van Driessche

13 August 2021 4	Charleroi	1–1	Antwerp	Charleroi
20:45 CEST (UTC+2)	Zaroury 57'; Gholizadeh (yellow card) 71'	Report	Fischer 38'; Gerkens (yellow card) 42'; L. Verstraete (yellow card) 90+2'	Stadium: Stade du Pays de Charleroi; Attendance: 6,921; Referee: Jonathan Lardot

29 August 2021 6	Antwerp	2–2	OH Leuven	Antwerp
16:00 CEST (UTC+2)	Maertens 38' (o.g.); Frey 45+2' (pen.); Vines (yellow card) 54'; Balikwisha (yellow card) 67'; Buta (yellow card) 71'; B. Verstraete (yellow card) 90+3'	Report	Maertens (yellow card) 48'; Özkacar 55'; Ngawa (yellow card) 67'; Shengelia 76'; Schrijvers (yellow card) 83'; Dewaest (yellow card) 90+2' (yellow-red card) 90+2'	Stadium: Bosuilstadion; Attendance: 10,223; Referee: Wesli De Cremer

11 September 2021 7	Eupen	0–1	Antwerp	Eupen
16:15 CEST (UTC+2)	Prevljak (yellow card) 87'	Report	De Laet (yellow card) 38'; Nainggolan (yellow card) 41'; Miyoshi (yellow card) 42'; Frey 55'; B. Verstraete (yellow card) 68'; Gerkens (yellow card) 80'	Stadium: Kehrwegstadion; Attendance: 2,016; Referee: Kevin Van Damme

19 September 2021 8	Antwerp	2–1	Seraing	Antwerp
16:00 CEST (UTC+2)	Frey 75'; Almeida (yellow card) 77'; Gerkens 88'	Report	Mikautadze 56'; Maziz (yellow card) 77'	Stadium: Bosuilstadion; Attendance: 10,177; Referee: Jan Boterberg

22 September 2021 5	Antwerp	4–2	Genk	Antwerp
20:45 CEST (UTC+2)	De Laet 27', (yellow card) 45' (yellow-red card) 84'; B. Verstraete 37'; Miyoshi 41'; Frey (yellow card) 44', (goal) 69'; Almeida (yellow card) 79'; Haroun (yellow card) 89'	Report	Onuachu 13', 80' (pen.), (yellow card) 56'; Muñoz (yellow card) 45+1'; Thorstvedt (yellow card) 72'	Stadium: Bosuilstadion; Attendance: 15,600; Referee: Bram Van Driessche

26 September 2021 9	Union SG	1–2	Antwerp	Forest
13:30 CEST (UTC+2)	Lapoussin (yellow card) 38'; Undav 43'; Kandouss (yellow card) 45+1'; Nieuwkoop (yellow card) 58'	Report	Frey (yellow card) 34', (goal) 70'; Fischer (yellow card) 71'; Benson 79', (yellow card) 87'	Stadium: Stade Joseph Marien; Attendance: 6,800; Referee: Nicolas Laforge

3 October 2021 10	Antwerp	1–0	Gent	Antwerp
18:30 CEST (UTC+2)	Bataille (yellow card) 20'; Frey 78'	Report	Chakvetadze (red card) 33'; Samoise (yellow card) 54'; De Sart (yellow card) 90+2'	Stadium: Bosuilstadion; Attendance: 14,706; Referee: Alexandre Boucaut

16 October 2021 11	Zulte Waregem	2–1	Antwerp	Waregem
18:30 CEST (UTC+2)	Gano 59', (yellow card) 73'; Kutesa 66'; Fadera (yellow card) 90+4'	Report	Benson 19'; Yusuf (yellow card) 29'; Miyoshi (yellow card) 90+2'	Stadium: Regenboogstadion; Attendance: 7,182; Referee: Jonathan Lardot

24 October 2021 12	Antwerp	1–1	Club Brugge	Antwerp
13:30 CEST (UTC+2)	Engels (yellow card) 21', (goal) 35', (red card) 82'; De Laet (yellow card) 39'	Report	Mata (yellow card) 2'; Balanta (yellow card) 39'; Vanaken 45+2'; N'Soki (yellow card) 59' (yellow-red card) 90'	Stadium: Bosuilstadion; Attendance: 15,734; Referee: Nathan Verboomen

31 October 2021 13	Cercle Brugge	0–1	Antwerp	Bruges
16:00 CET (UTC+1)	Hotić (yellow card) 45+2'; Sousa (yellow card) 52'; Daland (yellow card) 70'; Vanhoutte (yellow card) 90+2'	Report	Vines (yellow card) 39'; Frey 57' (pen.); Yusuf (yellow card) 60'; B. Verstraete (yellow card) 63'; Samatta (yellow card) 70'; De Laet (yellow card) 90'	Stadium: Jan Breydel Stadium; Attendance: 3,273; Referee: Lothar D'hondt

7 November 2021 14	Antwerp	2–0	Anderlecht	Antwerp
18:30 CET (UTC+1)	Yusuf 63'; Frey (penalty missed) 82', 82'	Report	Cullen (yellow card) 31'; Hoedt (yellow card) 81'; Harwood-Bellis (yellow card) 82'	Stadium: Bosuilstadion; Attendance: 15,000; Referee: Jonathan Lardot

21 November 2021 15	Sint-Truiden	2–1	Antwerp	Sint-Truiden
16:00 CET (UTC+1)	Hayashi 31'; Koita 37'; Konaté (yellow card) 39'; Leistner (yellow card) 84'	Report	Samatta 82'	Stadium: Stayen; Attendance: 5,370; Referee: Erik Lambrechts

28 November 2021 16	Antwerp	3–0	Oostende	Antwerp
21:00 CET (UTC+1)	Fischer 48'; Dwomoh (yellow card) 53'; Frey 62'; Benson 80'	Report	Koziello (yellow card) 38'; Ndicka (yellow card) 84'	Stadium: Bosuilstadion; Attendance: 15,000; Referee: Christof Dierick

5 December 2021 17	Beerschot	0–1	Antwerp	Antwerp
13:30 CET (UTC+1)	Bourdin (yellow card) 26'; Dom (yellow card) 56'; Van den Bergh (yellow card) 90+3'; Pietermaat (yellow card) 90+6'; Holzhauser (yellow card) 90+6'	Report	Samatta (yellow card) 26'; Nainggolan 59'	Stadium: Olympisch Stadion; Attendance: 10,000; Referee: Lothar D'hondt

12 December 2021 18	Antwerp	2–3	Standard Liège	Antwerp
13:30 CET (UTC+1)	Seck (red card) 45+3'; Yusuf (yellow card) 49'; Nainggolan (yellow card) 64'; Engels 66', (yellow card) 90+12'; Balikwisha 77'; Bataille (red card) 90+2'; Butez (yellow card) 90+6'	Report	Fai (yellow card) 27'; Amallah (yellow card) 45+3'; Dussenne (yellow card) 55'; Laifis 57'; Raskin (yellow card) 55'; Bokadi (yellow card) 64'; Carcela 87'; Muleka 90'; Pavlović (red card) 90+2'; Nkounkou (yellow card) 90+12'	Stadium: Bosuilstadion; Attendance: 10,980; Referee: Lawrence Visser

16 December 2021 19	Antwerp	4–2	Eupen	Antwerp
18:45 CET (UTC+1)	Samatta 27'; Benson 40'; Nainggolan 48'; B. Verstraete 90+5'	Report	Keita 44'; Prevljak 77'; Magnée (yellow card) 90+1'	Stadium: Bosuilstadion; Attendance: 8,664; Referee: Alexandre Boucaut

19 December 2021 20	Genk	1–1	Antwerp	Genk
18:30 CET (UTC+1)	Onuachu 32'	Report	Almeida (yellow card) 36'; Fischer 82'; De Laet (yellow card) 90+2'	Stadium: Cegeka Arena; Attendance: 14,253; Referee: Nicolas Laforge

16 January 2022 22	Antwerp	3–0	Charleroi	Antwerp
13:30 CET (UTC+1)	Frey 11', 14'; B. Verstraete (yellow card) 39'; Bataille (yellow card) 71'; Samatta 77'	Report	Tchatchoua (yellow card) 37'; Van Cleemput (yellow card) 40'	Stadium: Bosuilstadion; Attendance: 0 Referee: Nicolas Laforge

21 January 2022 23	Oostende	1–2	Antwerp	Ostend
20:45 CET (UTC+1)	Medley 48'; Koziello (yellow card) 88'	Report	Nainggolan (yellow card) 23'; Frey 61'; Balikwisha 70'; B. Verstraete (yellow card) 90'	Stadium: Diaz Arena; Attendance: 0 Referee: Bert Put

25 January 2022 24	Antwerp	1–1	Sint-Truiden	Antwerp
18:45 CET (UTC+1)	Balikwisha 32'	Report	Hara (yellow card) 47', (goal) 54'; Cacace (yellow card) 50'	Stadium: Bosuilstadion; Attendance: 0 Referee: Kevin Van Damme

30 January 2022 25	Gent	0–1	Antwerp	Ghent
16:00 CET (UTC+1)	Samoise (yellow card) 66'; Okumu (yellow card) 90+3'; Bolat (yellow card) 90+3'	Report	Frey (penalty missed) 14'; Yusuf 16'; Balikwisha (yellow card) 45+2'; B. Verstraete (yellow card) 89'; Haroun (yellow card) 90+1'	Stadium: Ghelamco Arena; Attendance: 15,954; Referee: Lothar D'hondt

2 February 2022 21	Kortrijk	0–2	Antwerp	Kortrijk
18:45 CET (UTC+1)	Torp (yellow card) 57'; Kadri (red card) 68'; D'haene (yellow card) 70'	Report	B. Verstraete (red card) 10'; Samatta 18'; Dessoleil (yellow card) 59'; Gerkens 90+1'	Stadium: Guldensporen Stadion; Attendance: 4,411; Referee: Jasper Vergoote

5 February 2022 26	Antwerp	0–2	Union SG	Antwerp
20:45 CET (UTC+1)	De Laet (yellow card) 4'; Butez (yellow card) 77'; Frey (yellow card) 90+3'	Report	Van der Heyden (yellow card) 20'; Undav 50', 77', (yellow card) 78'; Moris (yellow card) 90+5'	Stadium: Bosuilstadion; Attendance: 10,000; Referee: Bram Van Driessche

11 February 2022 27	Seraing	0–1	Antwerp	Seraing
20:45 CET (UTC+1)	Mouandilmadji (yellow card) 75'	Report	Haroun (yellow card) 54'; Samatta (red card) 63'; Dietsch 90+2' (o.g.); Balikwisha (yellow card) 90+7'	Stadium: Stade du Pairay; Attendance: 2,500; Referee: Arthur Denil

20 February 2022 28	Antwerp	1–2	KV Mechelen	Antwerp
13:30 CET (UTC+1)	Haroun (yellow card) 67'; Frey 83'		Cuypers 24'; Storm 26'; Vinícius (yellow card) 67'; Vanlerberghe (yellow card) 85'	Stadium: Bosuilstadion; Attendance: 11,354; Referee: Lothar D'hondt

27 February 2022 29	Club Brugge	4–1	Antwerp	Bruges
13:30 CET (UTC+1)	Odoi 31'; Vanaken 37' (pen.), (yellow card) 87'; Rits (yellow card) 43'; Adamyan (yellow card) 54', (goal) 59'; Skov Olsen 64'		Frey 29'; B. Verstraete (yellow card) 36'; Haroun (yellow card) 90+2'	Stadium: Jan Breydel Stadium; Attendance: 23,157; Referee: Lawrence Visser

6 March 2022 30	Antwerp	2–1	Beerschot	Antwerp
13:30 CET (UTC+1)	Buta (yellow card) 45'; Seck (yellow card) 58'; Frey 62', 83'		Shankland (yellow card) 24'; Dom 42'; Sanusi (yellow card) 68'; De Smet (yellow card) 30' (yellow-red card) 73'; Holzhauser (yellow card) 79'; Van den Bergh (yellow card) 88'	Stadium: Bosuilstadion; Attendance: 10,000; Referee: Nathan Verboomen

13 March 2022 31	Anderlecht	2–1	Antwerp	Anderlecht
13:30 CET (UTC+1)	Zirkzee 24'; Gómez (yellow card) 34'; Refaelov 59' (pen.); Sardella (yellow card) 75'; Kouamé (yellow card) 90+5'		Nainggolan (yellow card) 14'; Buta (yellow card) 34'; Yusuf 42', (yellow card) 72'; Vines (yellow card) 44'	Stadium: Constant Vanden Stock Stadium; Attendance: 19,000; Referee: Lawrence Visser

19 March 2022 32	Antwerp	1–0	Zulte Waregem	Antwerp
20:45 CET (UTC+1)	Mbwana Samatta 83'; Buta (yellow card) 90+3'		Vossen (yellow card) 21'; Doumbia (yellow card) 41'	Stadium: Bosuilstadion; Attendance: 9,000; Referee: Alexandre Boucaut

2 April 2022 33	OH Leuven	0–1	Antwerp	Leuven
20:45 CEST (UTC+2)	Dewaest (yellow card) 65'		B. Verstraete (yellow card) 8'; Seck (yellow card) 14', (goal) 40'; Buta (yellow card) 30'	Stadium: Den Dreef; Attendance: 6,491; Referee: Jonathan Lardot

9 April 2022 34	Antwerp	1–1	Cercle Brugge	Antwerp
20:45 CEST (UTC+2)	Balikwisha 48'		Vitinho (yellow card) 40'; Denkey 76'	Stadium: Bosuilstadion; Attendance: 12,336; Referee: Kevin Van Damme

==== Play-Off I ====
Pos	Team	Pld	W	D	L	GF	GA	GD	Pts	Qualification or relegation	CLU	USG	AND	ANT
1	Club Brugge (C)	6	4	2	0	8	2	+6	50	Qualification for the Champions League group stage	—	1–0	1–1	1–0
2	Union SG	6	2	1	3	5	5	0	46	Qualification for the Champions League third qualifying round	0–2	—	3–1	0–1
3	Anderlecht	6	2	2	2	8	7	+1	40	Qualification for the Europa Conference League third qualifying round	0–0	0–2	—	2–1
4	Antwerp	6	1	1	4	3	10	−7	36	Qualification for the Europa Conference League second qualifying round	1–3	0–0	0–4	—

Source: Jupiler Pro League (in Dutch), Soccerway
Legend: Blue = home team win; Yellow = draw; Red = away team win.
Rules for classification: 1) Points; 2) Points without (possible) half points added due to rounding; 3) Regular season finishing position.
(C) Champions

==== Results summary ====
Overall								Home						Away					
Pld	W	D	L	GF	GA	GD	Pts	W	D	L	GF	GA	GD	W	D	L	GF	GA	GD
6	1	1	4	3	10	−7	4	0	1	2	1	7	−6	1	0	2	2	3	−1

Last updated: 22 May 2022.
Source: Jupiler Pro League

==== Results by round ====
Round	1	2	3	4	5	6
Ground	A	H	H	A	H	A
Result	L	D	L	L	L	W
Position	4	4	4	4	4	4

Updated to match(es) played on 22 May 2022. Source: Jupiler Pro League
A = Away; H = Home; W = Win; D = Draw; L = Loss

==== Matches ====
24 April 2022 1	Club Brugge	1–0	Antwerp	Bruges
13:30 CEST (UTC+2)	Buchanan 37'; N'Soki (yellow card) 59'		Nainggolan (yellow card) 29'; Dessoleil (yellow card) 41'; Seck (yellow card) 71' (yellow-red card) 90'; De Laet (yellow card) 78'	Stadium: Jan Breydel Stadium; Attendance: 29,000; Referee: Erik Lambrechts

1 May 2022 2	Antwerp	0–0	Union SG	Antwerp
13:30 CEST (UTC+2)	Haroun (yellow card) 39'; De Laet (yellow card) 45+2'; Bataille (yellow card) 58'; Almeida (yellow card) 78'		Nieuwkoop (yellow card) 42'; Bager (yellow card) 57'; Burgess (yellow card) 69'	Stadium: Bosuilstadion; Attendance: 11,781; Referee: Nicolas Laforge

8 May 2022 3	Antwerp	0–4	Anderlecht	Antwerp
18:30 CEST (UTC+2)	Benson (yellow card) 58'; Gerkens (yellow card) 82'		Arnstad (yellow card) 9'; Amuzu 10', 53', 55'; Kouamé (yellow card) 28'; Zirkzee 48'	Stadium: Bosuilstadion; Attendance: 13,876; Referee: Jonathan Lardot

12 May 2022 4	Anderlecht	2–1	Antwerp	Anderlecht
20:30 CEST (UTC+2)	Gómez 14' (pen.); Amuzu 44'; Mykhaylichenko (yellow card) 66'; Verschaeren (yellow card) 90+2'		Dwomoh (yellow card) 72'; Seck 84'	Stadium: Constant Vanden Stock Stadium; Attendance: 19,000; Referee: Nicolas Laforge

15 May 2022 5	Antwerp	1–3	Club Brugge	Antwerp
13:30 CEST (UTC+2)	Frey 19'; Dwomoh (yellow card) 40'; De Laet (yellow card) 41'; Seck (yellow card) 48'; Haroun (yellow card) 77'		Balanta (yellow card) 17'; Lang (yellow card) 45+1'; Vanaken 49' (pen.); Hendry 64'; Adamyan 66'; Odoi (yellow card) 68'	Stadium: Bosuilstadion; Attendance: 15,126; Referee: Lawrence Visser

22 May 2022 6	Union SG	0–1	Antwerp	Forest
16:00 CEST (UTC+2)	Van der Heyden (yellow card) 14'; Undav (yellow card) 74'; Mitoma (yellow card) 82'		Frey 71'; Dwomoh (yellow card) 83'	Stadium: Stade Joseph Marien; Attendance: 9,400; Referee: Jasper Vergoote

=== Belgian Cup ===
28 October 2021 Sixth round	Westerlo	2–1	Antwerp	Westerlo
20:45 CEST (UTC+2)	Van den Keybus 32'; Foster 44'; Van Eenoo (yellow card) 77'		Dwomoh (yellow card) 62'; Samatta 75'	Stadium: Het Kuipje; Referee: Jasper Vergoote

=== UEFA Europa League ===
==== Play-off round ====
The draw for the play-off round was held on 2 August 2021.

19 August 2021 First leg	Omonia (Cyprus)	4–2	(Belgium) Antwerp	Nicosia, Cyprus
20:00 EEST (UTC+3)	Loizou 43', 56'; Kakoullis 49'; Atiemwen 84' (pen.)	Report	Benson 26'; Gerkens (yellow card) 42'; Miyoshi 62', (yellow card) 68'; Seck (yellow card) 83'	Stadium: GSP Stadium; Attendance: 7,585; Referee: Andreas Ekberg (Sweden)

26 August 2021 Second leg	Antwerp (Belgium)	2–0 (a.e.t.) (4–4 agg.) (3–2 p)	(Cyprus) Omonia	Antwerp, Belgium
21:00 CEST (UTC+2)	Miyoshi 28'; Nainggolan (yellow card) 30'; Bataille (yellow card) 70'; Seck (yellow card) 79'; Gerkens 84'; Engels (yellow card) 86'; Balikwisha (yellow card) 112'	Report	Diskerud (yellow card) 70'; Lecjaks (yellow card) 72'; Zachariou (yellow card) 96'; Gómez (yellow card) 113'	Stadium: Bosuilstadion; Attendance: 10,470; Referee: Andris Treimanis (Latvia)
	Penalties
	Verstraete (penalty scored); Gerkens (penalty missed); Eggestein (penalty scored); Miyoshi (penalty scored)		(penalty missed) Gómez; (penalty scored) Atiemwen; (penalty missed) Lecjaks; (penalty scored) Yuste; (penalty missed) Zachariou

==== Group stage ====
The group stage draw was held on 27 August 2021.

Pos	Team	Pld	W	D	L	GF	GA	GD	Pts	Qualification	FRA	OLY	FEN	ANT
1	(Germany) Eintracht Frankfurt	6	3	3	0	10	6	+4	12	Advance to round of 16	—	3–1	1–1	2–2
2	(Greece) Olympiacos	6	3	0	3	8	7	+1	9	Advance to knockout round play-offs	1–2	—	1–0	2–1
3	(Turkey) Fenerbahçe	6	1	3	2	7	8	−1	6	Transfer to Europa Conference League	1–1	0–3	—	2–2
4	(Belgium) Antwerp	6	1	2	3	6	10	−4	5		0–1	1–0	0–3	—

Source: UEFA
Rules for classification: Group stage tiebreakers

16 September 2021 1	Olympiacos (Greece)	2–1	(Belgium) Antwerp	Piraeus, Greece
22:00 EEST (UTC+3)	Cissé (yellow card) 49'; El-Arabi 52'; A. Camara (yellow card) 67'; Reabciuk 87'	Report	Verstraete (yellow card) 4'; Bataille (yellow card) 53' (yellow-red card) 90'; Samatta 75'; Gerkens (yellow card) 90+1'	Stadium: Karaiskakis Stadium; Attendance: 15,615; Referee: Tamás Bognár (Hungary)

30 September 2021 2	Antwerp (Belgium)	0–1	(Germany) Eintracht Frankfurt	Antwerp, Belgium
18:45 CEST (UTC+1)	Nainggolan (yellow card) 29'; Frey (yellow card) 90+7'; Verstraete (yellow card) 90+7'	Report	Paciência 90+1' (pen.), (yellow card) 90+5'	Stadium: Bosuilstadion; Attendance: 13,193; Referee: Jakob Kehlet (Denmark)

21 October 2021 3	Fenerbahçe (Turkey)	2–2	(Belgium) Antwerp	Istanbul, Turkey
19:45 EEST (UTC+3)	Valencia 21', 45' (pen.), (penalty missed) 37'; Kadıoğlu (yellow card) 40'; Szalai (yellow card) 59'; Zajc (yellow card) 75'	Report	Samatta 2'; Fischer (yellow card) 44'; Priske (yellow card) 48'; De Laet (yellow card) 54'; Gerkens 62', (yellow card) 81'	Stadium: Şükrü Saracoğlu Stadium; Attendance: 16,629; Referee: Sergey Ivanov (Russia)

4 November 2021 4	Antwerp (Belgium)	0–3	(Turkey) Fenerbahçe	Antwerp, Belgium
21:00 CET (UTC+1)		Report	Yandaş 8'; Meyer 16'; Kahveci (yellow card) 26'; Berisha 29'	Stadium: Bosuilstadion; Attendance: 0 Referee: Irfan Peljto (Bosnia and Herzegovina)

25 November 2021 5	Eintracht Frankfurt (Germany)	2–2	(Belgium) Antwerp	Frankfurt, Germany
21:00 CET (UTC+1)	Kamada 13'; Paciência 90+4'	Report	Nainggolan 33'; Dessoleil (yellow card) 59'; Frey (yellow card) 83'; Samatta 88'	Stadium: Waldstadion; Attendance: 30,000; Referee: Paul Tierney (England)

9 December 2021 6	Antwerp (Belgium)	1–0	(Greece) Olympiacos	Antwerp, Belgium
18:45 CET (UTC+1)	Balikwisha 7'	Report		Stadium: Bosuilstadion; Attendance: 7,992; Referee: Marco Di Bello (Italy)

== Statistics ==
=== Squad appearances and goals ===
Last updated on 3 October 2021.

No.	Pos	Nat	Player	Total		Belgian Division		Belgian Cup		UEFA Europa League	
No.	Pos	Nat	Player	Apps	Goals	Apps	Goals	Apps	Goals	Apps	Goals
Goalkeepers
1	GK	(France) FRA	Jean Butez	14	0	10	0	0	0	4	0
26	GK	(Belgium) BEL	Ortwin De Wolf	0	0	0	0	0	0	0	0
71	GK	(Croatia) CRO	Davor Matijaš	0	0	0	0	0	0	0	0
Defenders
2	DF	(Belgium) BEL	Ritchie De Laet	13	1	9	1	0	0	4	0
3	DF	(Belgium) BEL	Björn Engels	4	0	2	0	0	0	2	0
5	DF	(Portugal) POR	Aurélio Buta	14	0	7+3	0	0	0	3+1	0
12	DF	(Democratic Republic of the Congo) COD	Luete Ava Dongo	0	0	0	0	0	0	0	0
17	DF	(Belgium) BEL	Robbe Quirynen	2	0	2	0	0	0	0	0
18	DF	(France) FRA	Yassine Ben Hamed	1	0	0+1	0	0	0	0	0
21	DF	(United States) USA	Sam Vines	3	0	1	0	0	0	1+1	0
24	DF	(Belgium) BEL	Dorian Dessoleil	5	0	4	0	0	0	1	0
30	DF	(Senegal) SEN	Abdoulaye Seck	9	0	4+3	0	0	0	0+2	0
61	DF	(Portugal) POR	Dinis Almeida	8	0	4+2	0	0	0	2	0
Midfielders
4	MF	(Belgium) BEL	Radja Nainggolan	10	0	6	0	0	0	3+1	0
6	MF	(Belgium) BEL	Birger Verstraete	14	1	9+1	1	0	0	4	0
8	MF	(Nigeria) NGR	Alhassan Yusuf	5	0	3	0	0	0	1+1	0
10	MF	(Belgium) BEL	Michel-Ange Balikwisha	5	0	0+3	0	0	0	2	0
11	MF	(Democratic Republic of the Congo) COD	Nill De Pauw	1	0	0+1	0	0	0	0	0
15	MF	(Belgium) BEL	Manuel Benson	12	4	5+4	2	0	0	2+1	2
16	MF	(Belgium) BEL	Pieter Gerkens	14	2	8+2	1	0	0	1+3	1
19	MF	(Japan) JPN	Koji Miyoshi	11	3	6+1	1	0	0	2+2	2
23	MF	(Ghana) GHA	Opoku Ampomah	0	0	0	0	0	0	0	0
27	MF	(Belgium) BEL	Abderahmane Soussi	2	0	1+1	0	0	0	0	0
34	MF	(Belgium) BEL	Jelle Bataille	13	0	7+3	0	0	0	3	0
38	MF	(Belgium) BEL	Faris Haroun	4	0	0+3	0	0	0	0+1	0
70	MF	(Tanzania) TAN	Mbwana Samatta	7	1	2+3	0	0	0	2	1
80	MF	(Belgium) BEL	Pierre Dwomoh	0	0	0	0	0	0	0	0
Forwards
7	FW	(Denmark) DEN	Viktor Fischer	11	1	8+1	1	0	0	2	0
9	FW	(Germany) GER	Johannes Eggestein	10	0	0+6	0	0	0	3+1	0
14	FW	(Belgium) BEL	Manuel Benson	2	0	0+1	0	0	0	1	0
22	FW	(Angola) ANG	Bruny Nsimba	0	0	0	0	0	0	0	0
90	FW	(Canada) CAN	Jules-Anthony Vilsaint	0	0	0	0	0	0	0	0
99	FW	(Switzerland) SUI	Michael Frey	12	12	10	12	0	0	1+1	0
Players who have made an appearance this season but have left the club

=== Goalscorers ===
As of 22 May 2022

Rank	No.	Pos	Nat	Name	First Division A	Belgian Cup	Europa League	Total
1	99	FW	(Switzerland)	Michael Frey	24	0	0	24
2	70	FW	(Tanzania)	Mbwana Samatta	5	1	3	9
3	14	FW	(Belgium)	Manuel Benson	5	0	1	6
4	10	FW	(Belgium)	Michel-Ange Balikwisha	4	0	1	5
5	16	MF	(Belgium)	Pieter Gerkens	2	0	2	4
6	4	MF	(Belgium)	Radja Nainggolan	2	0	1	3
6	7	FW	(Denmark)	Viktor Fischer	3	0	0	3
6	8	MF	(Nigeria)	Alhassan Yusuf	3	0	0	3
6	19	FW	(Japan)	Koji Miyoshi	1	0	2	3
10	3	DF	(Belgium)	Björn Engels	2	0	0	2
10	6	MF	(Belgium)	Birger Verstraete	2	0	0	2
10	30	DF	(Senegal)	Abdoulaye Seck	2	0	0	2
13	2	DF	(Belgium)	Ritchie De Laet	1	0	0	1
Totals					56	1	10	67
