= 2020–21 Royal Antwerp FC season =

Royal Antwerp
2020–21 season
- Owner: Paul Gheysens
- Manager: Franky Vercauteren
- Stadium: Bosuilstadion
- Belgian First Division A: 3rd
- Belgian Cup: Seventh round
- Belgian Super Cup: Final (cancelled due to COVID-19)
- UEFA Europa League: Round of 32
- Top goalscorer: League: Dieumerci Mbokani (11); All: Lior Refaelov (14)
Home colours	Away colours	Third colours
- All statistics correct as of 23 May 2021.

The 2020–21 season was the 117th season in the existence of Royal Antwerp F.C. and the club's fourth consecutive season in the top flight of Belgian football. In addition to the domestic league, Antwerp participated in this season's editions of the Belgian Cup, of which they were the reigning champions, the Belgian Super Cup and participated in the UEFA Europa League. The season covered the period from 1 July 2020 to 30 June 2021.

== Players ==
=== First-team squad ===
As of 1 February 2021

Note: Flags indicate national team as defined under FIFA eligibility rules; some limited exceptions apply. Players may hold more than one non-FIFA nationality.

No.	Pos.	Nation	Player
1	GK	IRI	Alireza Beiranvand
2	DF	BEL	Ritchie De Laet
3	DF	KOR	Lee Jae-ik
4	DF	SEN	Abdoulaye Seck
5	MF	BEL	Birger Verstraete
6	DF	NOR	Simen Juklerød
7	FW	CMR	Didier Lamkel Zé
9	FW	CGO	Guy Mbenza
11	MF	ISR	Lior Refaelov
12	DF	COD	Luete Ava Dongo
14	MF	BEL	Nill De Pauw
15	MF	CMR	Frank Boya
16	MF	BEL	Pieter Gerkens
18	DF	CMR	Martin Hongla
19	MF	JPN	Koji Miyoshi
20	MF	BEL	Sander Coopman

No.	Pos.	Nation	Player
21	DF	FRA	Dylan Batubinsika
22	FW	BEL	Bruny Nsimba
23	MF	GHA	Nana Ampomah
25	MF	BEL	Alexis De Sart
26	DF	FRA	Jérémy Gelin
30	DF	POR	Aurélio Buta
38	MF	BEL	Faris Haroun (Captain)
46	GK	FRA	Jean Butez
64	DF	BEL	Dragan Lausberg
70	FW	COD	Dieumerci Mbokani
71	GK	CRO	Davor Matijaš
90	FW	URU	Felipe Avenatti
94	DF	BEL	Jordan Lukaku
97	GK	BEL	Ortwin De Wolf
—	DF	FRA	Maxime Le Marchand
—	DF	BRA	Matheus

== Transfers ==
=== In ===
No.	Pos	Player	Transferred from	Fee	Date	Source
1	GK	(Iran) Alireza Beiranvand	(Iran) Persepolis	€600,000	1 July 2020	
5	MF	(Belgium) Birger Verstraete	(Germany) 1. FC Koln	Loan	1 July 2020	
15	MF	(Cameroon) Frank Boya	(Belgium) Mouscron	Free	1 July 2020	
19	MF	(Japan) Koji Miyoshi	(Japan) Kawasaki Frontale	€1,200,000	1 July 2020	
46	GK	(France) Jean Butez	(Belgium) Mouscron	€1,000,000	1 July 2020	
64	DF	(Belgium) Dragan Lausberg	(Belgium) Standard Liège U18	Free	1 July 2020	
11	FW	(Democratic Republic of the Congo) Nill De Pauw	(Greece) Atromitos	Free	24 July 2020	
16	MF	(Belgium) Pieter Gerkens	(Belgium) Anderlecht	€700,000	12 August 2020	
3	DF	(South Korea) Lee Jae-ik	(Qatar) Al-Rayyan	Loan	16 September 2020	
17	MF	(Peru) Cristian Benavente	(Egypt) Pyramids FC	Loan	1 October 2020	
9	FW	(Republic of the Congo) Guy Mbenza	(Belgium) Cercle Brugge	€700,000	5 October 2020	
23	FW	(Ghana) Nana Ampomah	(Germany) Fortuna Düsseldorf	Loan	5 October 2020	
26	DF	(France) Jérémy Gelin	(France) Rennes	Loan	5 October 2020	
94	DF	(Belgium) Jordan Lukaku	(Italy) Lazio	Loan	5 October 2020	
90	FW	(Uruguay) Felipe Avenatti	(Belgium) Standard Liège	Loan	28 January 2021	
31	DF	(France) Maxime Le Marchand	(England) Fulham	Loan	1 February 2021	
97	GK	(Belgium) Ortwin De Wolf	(Belgium) Eupen	Loan	1 February 2021	
	FW	(Canada) Jules-Anthony Vilsaint	Free agent	Free	27 March 2021	

=== Out ===
No.	Pos	Player	Transferred to	Fee	Date	Source
4	DF	(Ghana) Daniel Opare	(Belgium) Zulte Waregem	Free	1 July 2020	
14	FW	(Senegal) Amara Baby	(Belgium) K.A.S. Eupen	Free	1 July 2020	
15	DF	(Belgium) Dino Arslanagić	(Belgium) Gent	Free	1 July 2020	
16	MF	(Belgium) Steven Defour		Free	1 July 2020	
60	MF	(Mali) Sambou Yatabaré		Free	1 July 2020	
	FW	(Mali) Kafoumba Touré		Free	1 July 2020	
	MF	(Ukraine) Yehor Nazaryna	(Ukraine) Zorya Luhansk	Undisclosed	28 July 2020	
39	GK	(Belgium) Jens Teunckens	(Cyprus) AEK Larnaca	Free	10 August 2020	
	GK	(Belgium) Bill Lathouwers	(Netherlands) MVV	Free	17 August 2020	
17	DF	(Belgium) Robbie Quirynen	(Belgium) Mouscron	Loan	19 August 2020	
1	GK	(Turkey) Sinan Bolat	Free	27 August 2020		
9	FW	(Democratic Republic of the Congo) Jonathan Bolingi	(Turkey) Ankaragücü	Loan	1 September 2020	
87	FW	(Belgium) Kevin Mirallas	(Turkey) Gaziantep	Free	5 October 2020	
8	MF	(Portugal) Ivo Rodrigues	(Portugal) Famalicão	Free	15 January 2021	
28	FW	(Belgium) Manuel Benson	(Netherlands) PEC Zwolle	Loan	26 January 2021	
40	DF	(Nigeria) Junior Pius	(Belgium) Sint-Truiden	Loan	1 February 2021	
	MF	(Belgium) Louis Verstraete	(Belgium) Waasland-Beveren	Loan	1 February 2021	
9	FW	(Democratic Republic of the Congo) Jonathan Bolingi	(Switzerland) Lausanne	Loan	5 February 2021	
9	FW	(Republic of the Congo) Guy Mbenza	(Switzerland) Stade Lausanne Ouchy	Loan	15 February 2021	

== Pre-season and friendlies ==
Win Draw Loss Fixtures

== Competitions ==
=== Overview ===
Competition	First match	Last match	Starting round	Final position	Record							
Competition	First match	Last match	Starting round	Final position	Pld	W	D	L	GF	GA	GD	Win %
Belgian First Division A	8 August 2020	23 May 2021	Matchday 1	3rd	40	19	8	13	63	59	+4	47.50
Belgian Cup	2 February 2021	10 February 2021	Sixth round	Seventh round	2	1	0	1	3	4	−1	50.00
UEFA Europa League	22 October 2020	25 February 2021	Group stage	Round of 32	8	4	0	4	13	14	−1	50.00
Total					50	24	8	18	79	77	+2	48.00

Last updated: 23 May 2021
Source: Soccerway

=== Belgian First Division A ===
==== Regular season ====
Pos	Team	Pld	W	D	L	GF	GA	GD	Pts	Qualification or relegation
1	Club Brugge (C)	34	24	4	6	73	26	+47	76	Qualification for the Europa Conference League and Play-offs I (Note: The regular season winners will qualify for the 2021–22 UEFA Europa Conference League if they do not qualify for the 2021–22 UEFA Champions League in the playoffs or for the 2021–22 UEFA Europa League through the 2020–21 Belgian Cup.)
2	Antwerp	34	18	6	10	57	48	+9	60	Qualification for the Play-offs I
3	Anderlecht	34	15	13	6	51	34	+17	58	Qualification for the Play-offs I
4	Genk (Note: Genk qualifies for at least the play-off round of the Europa League through winning the 2021 Belgian Cup.)	34	16	8	10	67	48	+19	56	Qualification for the Play-offs I
5	Oostende (Note: On 14 April 2021 news was released that both Excel Mouscron and Oostende had not received a Belgian professional football license for the coming season, a requirement to play at the top two levels of Belgian football. For Oostende, a lack of financial transparency, together with generally poor quality and incompleteness of the submitted report, was given as the main reason by the committee for not awarding a license, while Excel Mouscron was refused a license as besides insufficient transparency, the committee also questioned several cash flows and whether the club was creditworthy in general, also due to the fact that the wages for the months of February and March had not yet been paid at that point. For Excel Mouscron, it was already the sixth year running the license was (initially) refused, however, the club has appealed the decision with the Belgian Court for Sports Arbitrage (BAS) successfully on each occasion and intended to do so again. Oostende was planning to launch an appeal as well, with the BAS to rule on the matter for both clubs before the 10th of May. Both clubs were allowed to add new documents to their case, but in case they however still did not receive a license after appeal, knew they would have been forced to relegate to the 2021–22 Belgian Division 2 and start the season with a 3-point penalty. Both Excel Mouscron and Oostende were however eventually awarded a license after appeal, meaning Oostende remained at the top level, while Excel Mouscron only dropped one level.)	34	15	8	11	49	41	+8	53	Qualification for the Play-offs II

Source: Jupiler Pro League (in Dutch), Soccerway
Rules for classification: 1) Points; 2) Matches won; 3) Goal difference; 4) Goals scored; 5) Away matches won; 6) Away goal difference; 7) Away goals scored; 8) Play-off.
(C) Champions

==== Results summary ====
Overall								Home						Away					
Pld	W	D	L	GF	GA	GD	Pts	W	D	L	GF	GA	GD	W	D	L	GF	GA	GD
34	18	6	10	57	48	+9	60	9	4	4	30	25	+5	9	2	6	27	23	+4

Last updated: 17 April 2021.
Source: Jupiler Pro League

==== Results by round ====
Round	1	2	3	4	5	6	7	8	9	10	11	12	13	14	15	16	17	18	19	20	21	22	23	24	25	26	27	28	29	30	31	32	33	34
Ground	H	A	H	A	A	H	A	H	A	H	A	H	A	H	A	H	H	A	H	A	A	H	H	A	H	A	A	H	A	H	A	H	A	H
Result	D	L	W	L	W	D	W	W	W	W	L	D	D	W	L	L	L	W	W	L	W	W	L	W	W	W	D	D	L	W	W	L	W	W
Position	11	13	8	13	8	10	6	5	5	1	6	6	6	4	4	7	7	7	5	6	3	3	3	3	2	2	2	2	2	2	2	2	2	2

Updated to match(es) played on 17 April 2021. Source: Jupiler Pro League
A = Away; H = Home; W = Win; D = Draw; L = Loss

==== Matches ====
The league fixtures were announced on 8 July 2020.

8 August 2020 1	Antwerp	1–1	Excel Mouscron	Antwerp
19:00 CEST (UTC+2)	Refaelov 49' (pen.); Buta (yellow card) 58'; De Laet (yellow card) 77'	Report	Onana (yellow card) 48'; Bakić 78'	Stadium: Bosuilstadion; Attendance: 0 Referee: Nathan Verboomen

16 August 2020 2	Cercle Brugge	2–1	Antwerp	Bruges
13:30 CEST (UTC+2)	Omolo (yellow card) 31'; Mbenza 80', 86'	Report	Gerkens 32'; Mbokani (yellow card) 65'	Stadium: Jan Breydel Stadium; Attendance: 0 Referee: Wim Smet

22 August 2020 3	Antwerp	1–0	Gent	Antwerp
20:45 CEST (UTC+2)	Mbokani 17'; Batubinsika (yellow card) 45'; De Pauw (yellow card) 60'	Report	Kums (yellow card) 53'	Stadium: Bosuilstadion; Attendance: 0 Referee: Jonathan Lardot

30 August 2020 4	Charleroi	2–0	Antwerp	Charleroi
18:15 CEST (UTC+2)	Dessoleil (yellow card) 13'; Nicholson 17', 90+1'; Busi (yellow card) 30'; Morioka (yellow card) 39'; Penneteau (yellow card) 83'	Report	Batubinsika (yellow card) 12'; Verstraete (red card) 22'; Gerkens (yellow card) 40'; Haroun (yellow card) 44'	Stadium: Stade du Pays de Charleroi; Attendance: 0 Referee: Alexandre Boucaut

13 September 2020 5	Sint-Truiden	2–3	Antwerp	Sint-Truiden
16:00 CEST (UTC+2)	Lee 1', 23'; Durkin (yellow card) 25'; Konaté (yellow card) 70' (yellow-red card) 89'	Report	Juklerød 16', 88'; Seck 33'; Batubinsika (yellow card) 41' (yellow-red card) 72'; Haroun (yellow card) 53'; Miyoshi (yellow card) 75'	Stadium: Stayen; Attendance: 1,600; Referee: Wim Smet

20 September 2020 6	Antwerp	2–2	Eupen	Antwerp
20:45 CEST (UTC+2)	De Laet (yellow card) 45+1'; Mbokani (yellow card) 45+5'; Pius 62', 77'	Report	Musona (yellow card) 35', (goal) 53'; Prevljak 45+2' (pen.), (yellow card) 65'; Koné (yellow card) 45+5'; Amat (yellow card) 69'; Ngoy (yellow card) 86'; Poulain (yellow card) 89'	Stadium: Bosuilstadion; Attendance: 3,800; Referee: Bram Van Driessche

25 September 2020 7	Kortrijk	1–3	Antwerp	Kortrijk
20:45 CEST (UTC+2)	Mboyo 3'; De Sart (yellow card) 69'; D'haene (yellow card) 83'	Report	Sainsbury 63' (o.g.); Refaelov 82'; Mbokani 90+2'	Stadium: Guldensporen Stadion; Attendance: 2,745; Referee: Alexandre Boucaut

2 October 2020 8	Antwerp	4–1	KV Mechelen	Antwerp
20:45 CEST (UTC+2)	Bushiri 5' (o.g.); Miyoshi 8'; Mbokani 43'; Hongla (yellow card) 57'; Seck 78'	Report	Bushiri (yellow card) 62'; Hairemans 67'; Bijker (yellow card) 76'	Stadium: Bosuilstadion; Attendance: 3,900; Referee: Nicolas Laforge

18 October 2020 9	Zulte Waregem	1–3	Antwerp	Waregem
13:30 CEST (UTC+2)	Dompé 7'; Seck (yellow card) 74'	Report	Haroun 57'; Hongla 64'; Refaelov (yellow card) 71'; Benavente 90+4'	Stadium: Regenboogstadion; Attendance: 3,230; Referee: Lothar D'hondt

25 October 2020 10	Antwerp	3–2	Beerschot	Antwerp
13:30 CET (UTC+1)	Refaelov 7'; Juklerød 15'; Hongla (yellow card) 34'; Gerkens (yellow card) 37'; Mbokani 74'; Haroun (yellow card) 78'; Buta (yellow card) 81'	Report	Suzuki 25', 73'; Frans (yellow card) 27'; Sanyang (yellow card) 86'	Stadium: Bosuilstadion; Attendance: 0 Referee: Jasper Vergoote

1 November 2020 11	Anderlecht	1–0	Antwerp	Anderlecht
13:30 CET (UTC+1)	Mukairu 76'	Report	De Laet (yellow card) 30'; Gelin (yellow card) 62'; Buta (yellow card) 78'	Stadium: Constant Vanden Stock Stadium; Attendance: 0 Referee: Jan Boterberg

8 November 2020 12	Antwerp	1–1	Standard Liège	Antwerp
13:30 CET (UTC+1)	Refaelov 10'	Report	Lestienne 68'; Tapsoba (yellow card) 74'; Raskin (yellow card) 74'; Pavlovic (yellow card) 90+3'	Stadium: Bosuilstadion; Attendance: 0 Referee: Bram Van Driessche

21 November 2020 13	Oostende	1–1	Antwerp	Ostend
18:30 CET (UTC+1)	Tanghe 80'; Kvasina (yellow card) 89'	Report	Haroun (yellow card) 34'; Refaelov 81'	Stadium: Versluys Arena; Attendance: 0 Referee: Erik Lambrechts

30 November 2020 14	Antwerp	3–2	OH Leuven	Antwerp
20:45 CET (UTC+1)	Batubinsika 5'; Mbokani 8'; Haroun (yellow card) 10'; Juklerød (yellow card) 41'; Hongla 57'; Seck (yellow card) 88'	Report	Henry 12' (pen.), (yellow card) 88'; Malinov (yellow card) 15'; Sowah 17'; Maertens (yellow card) 20'; Hubert (yellow card) 30'; Ngawa (yellow card) 38'	Stadium: Bosuilstadion; Attendance: 0 Referee: Wim Smet

6 December 2020 15	Genk	4–2	Antwerp	Genk
13:30 CET (UTC+1)	Onuachu 19', 23'; Uronen (yellow card) 45'; Bongonda 59'; Dessers 88'	Report	Miyoshi 3'; De Laet (yellow card) 40'; Hongla (yellow card) 40'; Lukaku (yellow card) 61'; Mbokani 83'	Stadium: Luminus Arena; Attendance: 0 Referee: Bram Van Driessche

13 December 2020 16	Antwerp	0–2	Club Brugge	Antwerp
13:30 CET (UTC+1)	Gelin (red card) 16'; Hongla (yellow card) 50'; Batubinsika (yellow card) 78'; Mbokani (yellow card) 83'	Report	Diatta 2'; Rits 49'; Balanta (yellow card) 56'	Stadium: Bosuilstadion; Attendance: 0 Referee: Nicolas Laforge

16 December 2020 17	Antwerp	0–1	Zulte Waregem	Antwerp
18:45 CET (UTC+1)	De Sart (yellow card) 70'; Ampomah (yellow card) 85'	Report	Bruno 36'; Marcq (yellow card) 49'; De Bock (yellow card) 58'; Opare (yellow card) 72'	Stadium: Bosuilstadion; Attendance: 0 Referee: Lothar D'hondt

20 December 2020 18	Waasland-Beveren	0–3	Antwerp	Beveren
20:45 CET (UTC+1)	Wiegel (yellow card) 57'	Report	Haroun (yellow card) 24'; Refaelov 25'; Ampomah 29'; Lukaku (yellow card) 35'; Mbokani 44'; Buta (yellow card) 67'; Seck (yellow card) 76'	Stadium: Freethiel Stadion; Attendance: 0 Referee: Jonathan Lardot

27 December 2020 19	Antwerp	2–1	Charleroi	Antwerp
13:30 CET (UTC+1)	Benavente 73'; Mbokani 78', (yellow card) 87'	Report	Seck 51' (o.g.); Diagne (yellow card) 90+1'	Stadium: Bosuilstadion; Attendance: 0 Referee: Alexandre Boucaut

10 January 2021 20	KV Mechelen	3–0	Antwerp	Mechelen
13:30 CET (UTC+1)	Schoofs 59'; Engvall (yellow card) 62'; Hairemans 63', 67'	Report	Batubinsika (yellow card) 42'; Buta (yellow card) 45+1'; Haroun (yellow card) 90+1'	Stadium: Achter de Kazerne; Attendance: 0 Referee: Erik Lambrechts

17 January 2021 21	Gent	0–1	Antwerp	Ghent
13:30 CET (UTC+1)	Kums (penalty missed) 52'; Bukari (yellow card) 71'	Report	De Pauw (yellow card) 36'; Beiranvand (yellow card) 51'; Hongla (yellow card) 54', (goal) 75'	Stadium: Ghelamco Arena; Attendance: 0 Referee: Nathan Verboomen

20 January 2021 22	Antwerp	1–0	Cercle Brugge	Antwerp
21:00 CET (UTC+1)	Boya (yellow card) 37'; Lamkel Zé 84', (yellow card) 85'	Report	Kanouté (yellow card) 41'; Musaba (yellow card) 79'; Bates (yellow card) 90+1'	Stadium: Bosuilstadion; Attendance: 0 Referee: Alexandre Boucaut

23 January 2021 23	Antwerp	1–2	Oostende	Antwerp
20:45 CET (UTC+1)	Gerkens 15'; Lukaku (yellow card) 22'; Buta (yellow card) 34'; Hongla (yellow card) 51'	Report	Hendry (yellow card) 8'; Sakala 35'; Hjulsager (yellow card) 59'; Bätzner (yellow card) 62'; Kvasina 85'	Stadium: Bosuilstadion; Attendance: 0 Referee: Bert Put

26 January 2021 24	Eupen	0–2	Antwerp	Eupen
18:45 CET (UTC+1)	Koch (yellow card) 56'; Agbadou (yellow card) 66'	Report	Refaelov 18', (penalty missed) 61'; Seck 28'; Gerkens (yellow card) 45+3'	Stadium: Kehrwegstadion; Attendance: 0 Referee: Bram Van Driessche

29 January 2021 25	Antwerp	3–2	Waasland-Beveren	Antwerp
20:45 CET (UTC+1)	Lamkel Zé 18', 57'; Lukaku (yellow card) 45'; Verstraete (yellow card) 68'; Batubinsika 87'	Report	Frey 44' (pen.), 71'; Albanese (yellow card) 85'	Stadium: Bosuilstadion; Attendance: 0 Referee: Wesley Alen

7 February 2021 26	Beerschot	1–2	Antwerp	Antwerp
13:30 CET (UTC+1)	Pietermaat (yellow card) 20'; Van den Bergh (yellow card) 39'; Sanyang (yellow card) 69'; Bourdin (yellow card) 77'; Frans 89'	Report	De Laet (yellow card) 71'; Lamkel Zé 84', (yellow card) 85'; Gerkens 87'; Refaelov (yellow card) 90+3'	Stadium: Olympisch Stadion; Attendance: 0 Referee: Jonathan Lardot

14 February 2021 27	Standard Liège	1–1	Antwerp	Liège
13:30 CET (UTC+1)	Carcela 8' (pen.); Lestienne (yellow card) 80'	Report	De Pauw 28'; Hongla (yellow card) 45+5'; Boya (yellow card) 56'; Lamkel Zé (yellow card) 79'; Le Marchand (yellow card) 90'	Stadium: Stade Maurice Dufrasne; Attendance: 0 Referee: Bram Van Driessche

21 February 2021 28	Antwerp	0–0	Sint-Truiden	Antwerp
20:45 CET (UTC+1)	De Laet (yellow card) 90+4'	Report	Lavalée (yellow card) 70'	Stadium: Bosuilstadion; Attendance: 0 Referee: Wesli De Cremer

1 March 2021 29	OH Leuven	2–0	Antwerp	Leuven
20:45 CET (UTC+1)	Mercier 25'; Al-Taamari 29'; Malinov (yellow card) 47'	Report	Seck (yellow card) 38'; Buta (yellow card) 85'	Stadium: Den Dreef; Attendance: 0 Referee: Lothar D'hondt

6 March 2021 30	Antwerp	4–2	Kortrijk	Antwerp
20:45 CET (UTC+1)	Seck (red card) 20'; Refaelov 28' (pen.); Mbokani (penalty missed) 54'; Le Marchand 55'; Lamkel Zé 72'; Mbokani (yellow card) 75'; Verstraete 85'	Report	De Sart (yellow card) 27'; Selemani 56'; Gano 67'	Stadium: Bosuilstadion; Attendance: 0 Referee: Christof Dierick

21 March 2021 31	Club Brugge	0–2	Antwerp	Bruges
13:30 CET (UTC+1)	Mata (yellow card) 40'; Lang (yellow card) 46' (yellow-red card) 89'; Mechele (yellow card) 60'	Report	Lamkel Zé 9'; Hongla (yellow card) 32'; Refaelov 43' (pen.); De Pauw (yellow card) 60'	Stadium: Jan Breydel Stadium; Attendance: 0 Referee: Nicolas Laforge

5 April 2021 32	Antwerp	1–4	Anderlecht	Antwerp
18:15 CEST (UTC+2)	Le Marchand 89'	Report	Cobbaut (yellow card) 17'; Nmecha (penalty missed) 51'; Ashimeru 52'; Murillo 62'; El Hadj 77'; Verschaeren 84'	Stadium: Bosuilstadion; Attendance: 0 Referee: Erik Lambrechts

12 April 2021 33	Excel Mouscron	2–3	Antwerp	Mouscron
20:45 CEST (UTC+2)	Olinga (yellow card) 38', (goal) 49'; Da Costa (yellow card) 81'; Agouzoul (yellow card) 83'; Harbaoui 88'	Report	Mbokani 22', 48'; Le Marchand (red card) 41'; Seck 62'; De Wolf (yellow card) 78'	Stadium: Stade Le Canonnier; Attendance: 0 Referee: Jan Boterberg

17 April 2021 34	Antwerp	3–2	Genk	Antwerp
20:45 CEST (UTC+2)	Seck (yellow card) 44'; Lamkel Zé (yellow card) 55', (goal) 67'; Mbokani (yellow card) 89', (goal) 90'; Batubinsika 90+2'	Report	Onuachu 22', 64' (pen.); Heynen (yellow card) 31'	Stadium: Bosuilstadion; Attendance: 0 Referee: Lothar D'hondt

==== Play-Off I ====
Pos	Team	Pld	W	D	L	GF	GA	GD	Pts	Qualification or relegation	CLU	GNK	ANT	AND
1	Club Brugge (C)	6	1	3	2	8	11	−3	44	Qualification for the Champions League group stage	—	1–2	2–1	2–2
2	Genk	6	5	1	0	15	5	+10	44	Qualification for the Champions League third qualifying round	3–0	—	4–0	1–1
3	Antwerp	6	1	2	3	6	11	−5	35	Qualification for the Europa League play-off round	0–0	2–3	—	1–0
4	Anderlecht	6	0	4	2	9	11	−2	33	Qualification for the Europa Conference League third qualifying round	3–3	1–2	2–2	—

Source: Jupiler Pro League (in Dutch), Soccerway
Legend: Blue = home team win; Yellow = draw; Red = away team win.
Rules for classification: 1) Points; 2) Points without (possible) half points added due to rounding; 3) Regular season finishing position.
(C) Champions

==== Results summary ====
Overall								Home						Away					
Pld	W	D	L	GF	GA	GD	Pts	W	D	L	GF	GA	GD	W	D	L	GF	GA	GD
6	1	2	3	6	11	−5	5	1	1	1	3	3	0	0	1	2	3	8	−5

Last updated: 23 May 2021.
Source: Jupiler Pro League

==== Results by round ====
Round	1	2	3	4	5	6
Ground	H	A	H	A	A	H
Result	L	D	D	L	L	W
Position	4	3	3	3	4	3

Updated to match(es) played on 23 May 2021. Source: Jupiler Pro League
A = Away; H = Home; W = Win; D = Draw; L = Loss

==== Matches ====
30 April 2021 1	Antwerp	2–3	Genk	Antwerp
20:45 CEST (UTC+2)	De Laet (yellow card) 10'; Le Marchand 57'; Miyoshi 61'; Verstraete (yellow card) 74'; Boya (yellow card) 81'	Report	Bongonda 20', 88'; Onuachu 73'; Arteaga (yellow card) 82'	Stadium: Bosuilstadion; Attendance: 0 Referee: Nicolas Laforge

8 May 2021 2	Anderlecht	2–2	Antwerp	Anderlecht
20:45 CEST (UTC+2)	Cullen (yellow card) 10'; Miazga (yellow card) 40', (goal) 90+6'; Verschaeren 57'	Report	Seck (yellow card) 4'; Mbokani 49', 84' (pen.); Verstraete (yellow card) 73'; Hongla (yellow card) 80'	Stadium: Constant Vanden Stock Stadium; Attendance: 0 Referee: Erik Lambrechts

13 May 2021 3	Antwerp	0–0	Club Brugge	Antwerp
18:30 CEST (UTC+2)	Verstraete (yellow card) 75'	Report	Mata (yellow card) 38'; Lang (yellow card) 75'	Stadium: Bosuilstadion; Attendance: 0 Referee: Bram van Driessche

16 May 2021 4	Club Brugge	2–1	Antwerp	Bruges
18:30 CEST (UTC+2)	Balanta (yellow card) 34'; Butez 60' (o.g.); Vanaken 66' (pen.); Van Der Brempt (yellow card) 81'	Report	Le Marchand (yellow card) 12'; Hongla (yellow card) 45'; Mbokani 62', (yellow card) 89'; De Laet (yellow card) 82'	Stadium: Jan Breydel Stadium; Attendance: 0 Referee: Nicolas Laforge

20 May 2021 5	Genk	4–0	Antwerp	Genk
18:30 CEST (UTC+2)	Thorstvedt 43', 49', 64'; Dessers 75'	Report	Miyoshi (yellow card) 16'; Lamkel Zé (yellow card) 67'	Stadium: Luminus Arena; Attendance: 0 Referee: Jan Boterberg

23 May 2021 6	Antwerp	1–0	Anderlecht	Antwerp
18:30 CEST (UTC+2)	Lamkel Zé 48', (yellow card) 90+1'; Verstraete (yellow card) 60'; Seck (yellow card) 90+3'	Report	Miazga (red card) 13'; Sambi Lokonga (yellow card) 58'	Stadium: Bosuilstadion; Attendance: 0 Referee: Alexandre Boucaut

=== Belgian Cup ===
2 February 2021 Sixth round	Antwerp	2–1	RAAL La Louvière	Antwerp
18:00 CET (UTC+1)	Mbenza 20'; Ampomah (yellow card) 60'; De Laet 73'	Report	Francotte (yellow card) 53'; Lazitch 58'; Calant (yellow card) 70'; Louagé (yellow card) 87'	Stadium: Bosuilstadion; Attendance: 0 Referee: Kevin Debeuckelaere

10 February 2021 Seventh round	Club Brugge	3–1	Antwerp	Bruges
20:45 CET (UTC+1)	Vanaken 49'; Dost 81'; Vormer 85'	Report	Verstraete (yellow card) 33'; De Laet (yellow card) 43'; Seck (yellow card) 62'; Lamkel Zé 83'	Stadium: Jan Breydel Stadium; Attendance: 0 Referee: Erik Lambrechts

=== UEFA Europa League ===
==== Group stage ====
The group stage draw was held on 2 October 2020.

Pos	Team	Pld	W	D	L	GF	GA	GD	Pts	Qualification	TOT	ANT	LASK	LUD
1	(England) Tottenham Hotspur	6	4	1	1	15	5	+10	13	Advance to knockout phase	—	2–0	3–0	4–0
2	(Belgium) Antwerp	6	4	0	2	8	5	+3	12	Advance to knockout phase	1–0	—	0–1	3–1
3	(Austria) LASK	6	3	1	2	11	12	−1	10		3–3	0–2	—	4–3
4	(Bulgaria) Ludogorets Razgrad	6	0	0	6	7	19	−12	0		1–3	1–2	1–3	—

Source: UEFA
Rules for classification: Group stage tiebreakers

22 October 2020 1	Ludogorets Razgrad (Bulgaria)	1–2	(Belgium) Antwerp	Razgrad, Bulgaria
21:00 CEST (UTC+2)	Higinio 46'; Cicinho (yellow card) 88'; Verdon (yellow card) 90+2'	Report	Gerkens 63'; Refaelov 70'; Juklerød (yellow card) 73'; Haroun (yellow card) 80'	Stadium: Huvepharma Arena; Attendance: 2,321; Referee: Roi Reinshreiber (Israel)

29 October 2020 2	Antwerp (Belgium)	1–0	(England) Tottenham Hotspur	Antwerp, Belgium
18:55 CET (UTC+1)	Seck (yellow card) 20'; Refaelov 29', (yellow card) 50'; Verstraete (yellow card) 84'; Mbokani (yellow card) 90'	Report		Stadium: Bosuilstadion; Attendance: 0 Referee: Maurizio Mariani (Italy)

5 November 2020 3	Antwerp (Belgium)	0–1	(Austria) LASK	Antwerp, Belgium
21:00 CET (UTC+1)	Verstraete (yellow card) 28'; Gerkens (yellow card) 75'; Ampomah (yellow card) 87'	Report	Holland (yellow card) 33' (yellow-red card) 68'; Ranftl (yellow card) 39'; Eggestein 55'; Schlager (yellow card) 90+4'	Stadium: Bosuilstadion; Attendance: 0 Referee: Yevhen Aranovskyi (Ukraine)

26 November 2020 4	LASK (Austria)	0–2	(Belgium) Antwerp	Linz, Austria
18:55 CET (UTC+1)	Trauner (red card) 50'; Goiginger (yellow card) 63'; Eggestein (yellow card) 73'	Report	Hongla (yellow card) 28'; Haroun (yellow card) 48'; Refaelov 53'; Gerkens 83'	Stadium: Linzer Stadion; Attendance: 0 Referee: Donatas Rumšas (Lithuania)

3 December 2020 5	Antwerp (Belgium)	3–1	(Bulgaria) Ludogorets Razgrad	Antwerp, Belgium
18:55 CET (UTC+1)	Hongla 19'; De Laet 72'; Benson 87'	Report	Despodov 53'; Grigore (yellow card) 62' (yellow-red card) 90+1'; Nedyalkov (yellow card) 71'; Santana (yellow card) 90+2'; Manu (yellow card) 90+4'	Stadium: Bosuilstadion; Attendance: 0 Referee: Pavel Orel (Czech Republic)

10 December 2020 6	Tottenham Hotspur (England)	2–0	(Belgium) Antwerp	Tottenham, England
21:00 CET (UTC+1)	Carlos Vinícius 57'; Lo Celso 71'; Sánchez (yellow card) 87'	Report	Seck (yellow card) 25'; Ampomah (yellow card) 77'	Stadium: Tottenham Hotspur Stadium; Attendance: 2,000; Referee: Jesús Gil Manzano (Spain)

==== Knockout phase ====
===== Round of 32 =====
The draw for the round of 32 was held on 14 December 2020.

18 February 2021 First leg	Antwerp (Belgium)	3–4	(Scotland) Rangers	Antwerp, Belgium
21:00 CET (UTC+1)	Avenatti 45'; Refaelov 45+8' (pen.); De Laet (yellow card) 58'; Seck (yellow card) 63' (yellow-red card) 88'; Hongla 66'	Report	Aribo 38'; Barišić (yellow card) 44', (goal) 59' (pen.), 90' (pen.); Kent (yellow card) 53', (goal) 83'; Arfield (yellow card) 64'	Stadium: Bosuilstadion; Attendance: 0 Referee: Georgi Kabakov (Bulgaria)

25 February 2021 Second leg	Rangers (Scotland)	5–2 (9–5 agg.)	(Belgium) Antwerp	Glasgow, Scotland
18:55 CET (UTC+1)	Morelos 9'; Balogun (yellow card) 36'; Patterson 46'; Kent 55'; Kamara (yellow card) 70'; Barišić 79' (pen.); Itten 90+2' (pen.)	Report	Refaelov 32'; Lamkel Zé 57'; Le Marchand (yellow card) 60'; Hongla (yellow card) 71'	Stadium: Ibrox Stadium; Attendance: 0 Referee: Paweł Raczkowski (Poland)

== Statistics ==
=== Squad appearances and goals ===
Last updated on 23 May 2021.

No.	Pos	Nat	Player	Total		Belgian Division		Belgian Cup		UEFA Europa League	
No.	Pos	Nat	Player	Apps	Goals	Apps	Goals	Apps	Goals	Apps	Goals
Goalkeepers
1	GK	(Iran) IRI	Alireza Beiranvand	12	0	10	0	0	0	2	0
46	GK	(France) FRA	Jean Butez	29	0	24	0	0	0	5	0
71	GK	(Croatia) CRO	Davor Matijaš	0	0	0	0	0	0	0	0
97	GK	(Belgium) BEL	Ortwin De Wolf	11	0	6+1	0	2	0	1+1	0
Defenders
2	DF	(Belgium) BEL	Ritchie De Laet	43	2	39	0	2	1	2	1
3	DF	(South Korea) KOR	Lee Jae-ik	0	0	0	0	0	0	0	0
4	DF	(Senegal) SEN	Abdoulaye Seck	46	4	37	4	2	0	7	0
6	DF	(Norway) NOR	Simen Juklerød	25	3	12+7	3	0	0	5+1	0
12	DF	(Democratic Republic of the Congo) COD	Luete Ava Dongo	0	0	0	0	0	0	0	0
21	DF	(France) FRA	Dylan Batubinsika	31	3	22+4	3	0+2	0	3	0
26	DF	(France) FRA	Jérémy Gelin	20	0	10+2	0	2	0	5+1	0
30	DF	(Portugal) POR	Aurélio Buta	34	0	16+9	0	0+1	0	3+5	0
31	DF	(France) FRA	Maxime Le Marchand	16	3	13	3	1	0	2	0
94	DF	(Belgium) BEL	Jordan Lukaku	29	0	20+2	0	1+1	0	3+2	0
Midfielders
5	MF	(Belgium) BEL	Birger Verstraete	31	1	18+5	1	2	0	2+4	0
11	MF	(Israel) ISR	Lior Refaelov	43	14	32+1	9	0+2	0	8	5
14	MF	(Democratic Republic of the Congo) COD	Nill De Pauw	25	1	14+10	1	1	0	0	0
15	MF	(Cameroon) CMR	Frank Boya	18	0	6+6	0	0+1	0	1+4	0
16	MF	(Belgium) BEL	Pieter Gerkens	46	5	31+6	3	1+1	0	7	2
18	MF	(Cameroon) CMR	Martin Hongla	43	5	32+2	3	1	0	8	2
19	MF	(Japan) JPN	Koji Miyoshi	32	3	14+9	3	1	0	5+3	0
20	MF	(Belgium) BEL	Sander Coopman	0	0	0	0	0	0	0	0
23	MF	(Ghana) GHA	Opoku Ampomah	24	1	4+11	1	1+1	0	0+7	0
25	MF	(Belgium) BEL	Alexis De Sart	9	0	3+5	0	1	0	0	0
38	MF	(Belgium) BEL	Faris Haroun	28	1	21+1	1	0	0	6	0
Forwards
7	FW	(Cameroon) CMR	Didier Lamkel Zé	24	10	19+2	8	1+1	1	1	1
22	FW	(Angola) ANG	Bruny Nsimba	5	0	1+4	0	0	0	0	0
70	FW	(Democratic Republic of the Congo) COD	Dieumerci Mbokani	35	14	29+3	14	0	0	2+1	0
90	FW	(Uruguay) URU	Felipe Avenatti	8	1	0+4	0	2	0	1+1	1
Players who have made an appearance this season but have left the club
17	MF	(Peru) PER	Cristian Benavente	15	2	1+8	2	0	0	4+2	0
9	FW	(Republic of the Congo) CGO	Guy Mbenza	2	1	0+1	0	1	1	0	0
28	FW	(Belgium) BEL	Manuel Benson	8	1	1+4	0	0	0	1+2	1

=== Goalscorers ===
As of 23 May 2021

Rank	No.	Pos	Nat	Name	First Division A	Belgian Cup	Europa League	Total
1	11	MF	(Israel)	Lior Refaelov	9	0	5	14
1	70	FW	(Democratic Republic of the Congo)	Dieumerci Mbokani	14	0	0	14
3	7	FW	(Cameroon)	Didier Lamkel Zé	8	1	1	10
4	16	MF	(Belgium)	Pieter Gerkens	3	0	2	5
4	18	MF	(Cameroon)	Martin Hongla	3	0	2	5
6	4	DF	(Senegal)	Abdoulaye Seck	4	0	0	4
7	6	DF	(Norway)	Simen Juklerød	3	0	0	3
7	19	FW	(Japan)	Koji Miyoshi	3	0	0	3
7	21	DF	(France)	Dylan Batubinsika	3	0	0	3
7	31	DF	(France)	Maxime Le Marchand	3	0	0	3
11	2	DF	(Belgium)	Ritchie De Laet	0	1	1	2
11	24	MF	(Peru)	Cristian Benavente	2	0	0	2
11	40	DF	(Nigeria)	Junior Pius	2	0	0	2
14	5	MF	(Belgium)	Birger Verstraete	1	0	0	1
14	9	FW	(Republic of the Congo)	Guy Mbenza	0	1	0	1
14	14	MF	(Belgium)	Nill De Pauw	1	0	0	1
14	23	MF	(Ghana)	Nana Ampomah	1	0	0	1
14	28	FW	(Belgium)	Manuel Benson	0	0	1	1
14	38	MF	(Belgium)	Faris Haroun	1	0	0	1
14	90	FW	(Uruguay)	Felipe Avenatti	0	0	1	1
Totals					61	3	13	77
