= 2020 Belgian Cup final =

- Event: 2019–20 Belgian Cup
Club Brugge	Antwerp
0	1
- Date: 1 August 2020
- Venue: King Baudouin Stadium, Brussels
- Referee: Nicolas Laforge
- Attendance: 0 (Note: The final was played behind closed doors due to the COVID-19 pandemic in Belgium.)

The 2020 Belgian Cup final, named Croky Cup after the sponsor, was the 65th Belgian Cup final. It was originally scheduled to take place on 22 March 2020, but was postponed to 1 August 2020 due to the COVID-19 pandemic in Belgium. The match was played without supporters and saw Club Brugge play Antwerp. Prior to the match, Club Brugge had already won the Belgian Cup 11 times, with their most recent appearance the 2016 Belgian Cup Final loss against Standard Liège. Antwerp featured in the cup final for the fourth time, with their previous final already 26 years ago when the club beat Mechelen on penalty kicks.

Defending champions Mechelen were unable to defend their title as they were found guilty of match-fixing as part of the investigation surrounding the 2017–19 Belgian football fraud scandal and therefore banned from the competition for one season.

== Route to the final ==
Club Brugge					Antwerp
Opponent	Result	Legs	Scorers	Round	Opponent	Result	Legs	Scorers
Francs Borains (IV)	3–0	3–0 away	Tau, Okereke (2)	Sixth round	Lokeren (II)	4–2	4–2 home (a.e.t.)	Mbokani, Miyoshi (2), Baby
Oostende (I)	1–1	1–1 away (a.e.t.) (4–2 p)	Diatta	Seventh round	Genk (I)	3–3	3–3 home (a.e.t.) (4–3 p)	Juklerød, Mbokani (2)
Anderlecht (I)	2–0	2–0 away	Vormer, Balanta	Quarter-finals	Standard Liège (I)	3–1	3–1 away	De Laet, Benson, Mbokani
Zulte Waregem (I)	3–2	1–1 home; 2–1 away	Rits; Mechele, De Ketelaere	Semi-finals	Kortrijk (I)	2–1	1–1 home; 1–0 away	Mbokani; Refaelov

== Pre-match ==
Both clubs were only allowed to use players that were part of the squad during the 2019–20 season, meaning that newly signed players during the summer 2020 transfer window were not eligible, while all players who had already left could of course no longer be used either. Antwerp was hampered due to this as no less than nine players had left the club over the summer up to that point, most notably including goalkeeper Sinan Bolat, defenders Dino Arslanagić, Wesley Hoedt and Daniel Opare, midfielders Steven Defour and Kevin Mirallas; and striker Zinho Gano. On the other hand, Club Brugge had seen almost no departures, with Percy Tau most influential.

== Match ==
=== Details ===
1 August 2020
20:30

Club Brugge	0–1	Antwerp
		Refaelov 25'

King Baudouin Stadium, Brussels
Attendance: 0
Referee: Nicolas Laforge

Club Brugge	Antwerp

GK	88	(Belgium) Simon Mignolet
RB	77	(Angola) Clinton Mata
CB	44	(Belgium) Brandon Mechele
CB	17	(Ivory Coast) Simon Deli
LB	11	(Senegal) Krépin Diatta
MF	25	(Netherlands) Ruud Vormer (c)	(yellow card) 90'
MF	20	(Belgium) Hans Vanaken
FW	3	(Colombia) Éder Álvarez Balanta	(yellow card) 39'	(substituted off) 75'
MF	2	(Ukraine) Eduard Sobol	(yellow card) 60'	(substituted off) 72'
CF	90	(Belgium) Charles De Ketelaere
LW	14	(Nigeria) David Okereke		(substituted off) 52'
Substitutes:
MF	26	(Belgium) Mats Rits	(yellow card) 76'	(substituted on) 75'
MF	16	(Belgium) Siebe Schrijvers		(substituted on) 72'
FW	27	(Senegal) Youssouph Mamadou Badji		(substituted on) 52'
FW	42	(Nigeria) Emmanuel Dennis
GK	22	(United States) Ethan Horvath
DF	5	(Ivory Coast) Odilon Kossounou
DF	18	(Uruguay) Federico Ricca
Manager:
(Belgium) Philippe Clement

GK	60	(Croatia) Davor Matijaš	(yellow card) 82'
RW	3	(Senegal) Abdoulaye Seck
CB	40	(Nigeria) Junior Pius	(yellow card) 32'
CB	2	(Belgium) Ritchie De Laet
MF	7	(Cameroon) Didier Lamkel Zé		(substituted off) 90'
CB	30	(Portugal) Aurélio Buta
CM	38	(Belgium) Faris Haroun (c)	(yellow card) 90'
CM	18	(Cameroon) Martin Hongla
DF	6	(Norway) Simen Juklerød
FW	11	(Israel) Lior Refaelov		(substituted off) 90+1'
FW	70	(Democratic Republic of the Congo) Dieumerci Mbokani
Substitutes:
GK	41	(Belgium) Bill Lathouwers
MF	12	(Democratic Republic of the Congo) Luete Ava Dongo
DF	17	(Belgium) Robbe Quirynen
MF	8	(Portugal) Ivo Rodrigues		(substituted on) 90'
MF	19	(Japan) Koji Miyoshi
MF	22	(Belgium) Bruny Nsimba		(substituted on) 90+1'
FW	28	(Belgium) Manuel Benson
Manager:
(Croatia) Ivan Leko

Assistant referees:
Florian Lemaire
Vito Di Vincenzo
Fourth official:
Bram Van Driessche

Match rules

- 90 minutes.
- 30 minutes of extra time if necessary.
- Penalty shoot-out if scores still level.
- Seven named substitutes.
- Maximum of three substitutions.
