= 2018–19 RSC Anderlecht season =

Anderlecht
2018–19 season
- Chairman: Marc Coucke
- Manager: Hein Vanhaezebrouck; Karim Belhocine
- Ground: Constant Vanden Stock Stadium
- Belgian First Division A: 6th
- Belgian Cup: Sixth round
- Europa League: Group stage
- Top goalscorer: League: Ivan Santini (16); All: Ivan Santini (16)
- Average home league attendance: 19,450
Home colours	Away colours	Third colours

The 2018–19 season played by Anderlecht, a Belgian football club based in Anderlecht, Brussels, covered the period from 1 July 2018 to 30 June 2019. Anderlecht participated in the Belgian First Division A, Belgian Cup and the UEFA Europa League.

== Match details ==
=== Regular season ===
Pos	Team	Pld	W	D	L	GF	GA	GD	Pts	Qualification or relegation
2	Club Brugge	30	16	8	6	64	32	+32	56	Qualification for the championship play-offs
3	Standard Liège	30	15	8	7	49	35	+14	53	Qualification for the championship play-offs
4	Anderlecht	30	15	6	9	49	34	+15	51	Qualification for the championship play-offs
5	Gent	30	15	5	10	53	45	+8	50	Qualification for the championship play-offs
6	Antwerp	30	14	7	9	39	34	+5	49	Qualification for the championship play-offs

Source: Belgian First Division A (in Dutch), Soccerway
Rules for classification: 1) Points; 2) Matches won; 3) Goal difference; 4) Goals scored; 5) Away goals scored; 6) Away matches won; 7) Play-off.

==== Matches ====
Belgian First Division A match details
Date	League position	Opponents	Venue	Result	Score F–A	Scorers	Attendance	Ref
28 July 2018	2nd	Kortrijk	A	W	4–1	Santini (3) 3', 48', 73', Dimata 31'	8,589	
5 August 2018	1st	KV Oostende	H	W	5–2	Santini (3) 46', 83' pen., 86', Dimata (2) 52', 89'	19,207	
12 August 2018	1st	Sporting Charleroi	A	W	2–1	Dimata 45+3' pen., Santini 64'	12,303	
17 August 2018	1st	Royal Excel Mouscron	H	W	2–0	Trebel 38', Dimata 63'	20,000	
26 August 2018	2nd	Club Brugge	A	L	1–2	Musona 19'	27,500	
2 September 2018	3rd	Antwerp	H	D	1–1	Gerkens 17'	21,000	
15 September 2018	4th	Genk	A	L	0–1		20,850	
23 September 2018	3rd	Standard Liège	H	W	2–1	Santini 72, Sanneh 90+4'	21,000	
30 September 2018	3rd	Sint-Truiden	H	D	0–0		21,000	
7 October 2018	3rd	Zulte-Waregem	A	W	2–1	Bakkali 43', Gerkens 78'	8,400	
21 October 2018	3rd	Cercle Brugge	H	W	4–2	Dimata (3) 8' pen., 32', 52', Gerkens 54'	19,000	
28 October 2018	4th	AS Eupen	A	L	1–2	Santini 79'	5,082	
1 November 2018	4th	Lokeren	H	D	1–1	Dimata 59'	20,000	
4 November 2018	4th	Waasland-Beveren	A	W	2–1	Dimata 12' pen., Trebel 83'	6,205	
11 November 2018	4th	Gent	H	W	2–0	Kums (2) 4', 73'	20,000	
25 November 2018	4th	Sint-Truiden	A	L	2–4	Santini (2) 38', 52' pen.	10,223	
2 December 2018	4th	Genk	H	L	0–1		20,000	
9 December 2018	4th	Sporting Charleroi	H	D	1–1	Amuzu 47'	20,000	
16 December 2018	4th	Cercle Brugge	A	L	1–2	Gerkens 22'	8,645	
22 December 2018	6th	Royal Excel Mouscron	A	L	1–3	Dimata 77'	6,889	
27 December 2018	5th	Waasland-Beveren	H	W	3–0	Dimata (2) 9', 90+1', Bornauw 51'	18,503	
19 January 2019	5th	Gent	A	L	0–1		20,000	
27 January 2019	5th	AS Eupen	H	W	2–1	Verschaeren 51', Santini 65'	19,000	
3 February 2019	6th	Standard Liège	A	L	1–2	Kums 28'	27,245	
10 February 2019	6th	Zulte-Waregem	H	D	0–0		18,000	
17 February 2019	6th	Antwerp	A	W	1–0	Bolasie 90+2'	14,346	
24 February 2019	6th	Club Brugge	H	D	2–2	Bolasie (2) 32', 81'	21,000	
3 March 2019	6th	Lokeren	A	W	2–1	Santini 15', Gerkens 67'	6,231	
10 March 2019	5th	Kortrijk	H	W	2–0	Kums (2) 33', 70'	19,503	
17 March 2019	4th	KV Oostende	A	W	2–0	Bolasie 70', Santini 90+5'	7,191	

=== Championship play-off ===
Pos	Team	Pld	W	D	L	GF	GA	GD	Pts	Qualification
1	Genk (C)	10	6	2	2	19	8	+11	52	Qualification for the Champions League group stage
2	Club Brugge	10	7	1	2	19	11	+8	50	Qualification for the Champions League third qualifying round
3	Standard Liège	10	4	1	5	17	16	+1	40	Qualification for the Europa League group stage
4	Antwerp (O)	10	4	2	4	12	16	−4	39	Qualification for the Europa League play-off Final
5	Gent	10	3	1	6	10	15	−5	35	Qualification for the Europa League second qualifying round
6	Anderlecht	10	1	3	6	8	19	−11	32	

Source: Sport.be
Rules for classification: 1) Points; 2) Points without (possible) half points added due to rounding; 3) Position obtained during the Regular season
(C) Champions; (O) Play-off winners

Belgian First Division A Championship play-off match details
Date	League position	Opponents	Venue	Result	Score F–A	Scorers	Attendance	Ref
30 March 2019	4th	Genk	A	L	0–3		20,000	
4 April 2019	5th	Club Brugge	H	L	2–3	Gerkens 64', Trebel 90'	20,000	
7 April 2019	5th	Antwerp	H	L	1–2	Gerkens 33'	19,000	
12 April 2019	5th	Standard Liège	A	FF	0–5		27,236	
21 April 2019	5th	Gent	H	D	0–0		17,500	
28 April 2019	5th	Club Brugge	A	L	0–1		24,925	
5 May 2019	5th	Standard Liège	H	W	2–1	Verschaeren 37', Santini 57'	19,000	
12 May 2019	5th	Antwerp	A	D	1–1	Santini 5'	15,408	
16 May 2019	6th	Genk	H	D	1–1	Bolasie 65'	19,000	
19 May 2019	6th	Gent	A	L	1–2	Bolasie 73'	19,243	

=== Belgian Cup ===
Belgian Cup match details
Round	Date	Opponents	Venue	Result	Score F–A	Scorers	Attendance	Ref
Sixth round	27 September 2018	Union Saint-Gilloise	H	L	0–3			

=== UEFA Europa League ===
==== Group stage ====
Pos	Team	Pld	W	D	L	GF	GA	GD	Pts	Qualification	DZG	FEN	SPT	AND
1	(Croatia) Dinamo Zagreb	6	4	2	0	11	3	+8	14	Advance to knockout phase	—	4–1	3–1	0–0
2	(Turkey) Fenerbahçe	6	2	2	2	7	7	0	8	Advance to knockout phase	0–0	—	2–0	2–0
3	(Slovakia) Spartak Trnava	6	2	1	3	4	7	−3	7		1–2	1–0	—	1–0
4	(Belgium) Anderlecht	6	0	3	3	2	7	−5	3		0–2	2–2	0–0	—

Source: UEFA
Rules for classification: Group stage tiebreakers

UEFA Europa League match details
Round	Date	Opponents	Venue	Result	Score F–A	Scorers	Attendance	Ref
Group	20 September 2018	Spartak Trnava	A	L	0–1		17,114	
Group	4 October 2018	Dinamo Zagreb	H	L	0–2		12,137	
Group	25 October 2018	Fenerbahçe	H	D	2–2	Bakkali (2) 35', 49'	13,292	
Group	8 November 2018	Fenerbahçe	A	L	0–2		32,789	
Group	29 November 2018	Spartak Trnava	H	D	0–0		8,063	
Group	13 December 2018	Dinamo Zagreb	A	D	0–0		12,170	

== Appearances and goals ==
Numbers in parentheses denote appearances as substitute.
Players with names struck through and marked † left the club during the playing season.
Players with names in italics and marked * were on loan from another club for the whole of their season with Anderlecht.
Players listed with no appearances have been in the matchday squad but only as unused substitutes.
Key to positions: GK – Goalkeeper; DF – Defender; MF – Midfielder; FW – Forward

Players contracted for the 2018–19 season
No.	Pos.	Nat.	Name	League		Cup		UEFA EL		Total		Discipline	
No.	Pos.	Nat.	Name	Apps	Goals	Apps	Goals	Apps	Goals	Apps	Goals	A yellow rectangle, denoting the yellow penalty card shown to a player being cautioned	A red rectangle, denoting the red penalty card shown to a player being sent off
1	GK	BEL	Frank Boeckx	0	0	1	0	1	0	2	0	0	0
2	DF	POR	~~Josué Sá~~ †	0	0	0	0	0	0	0	0	0	0
2	DF	SEN	Kara Mbodji	17	0	0	0	0	0	17	0	4	1
3	DF	WAL	James Lawrence	22 (1)	0	0	0	2 (1)	0	24 (2)	0	2	0
4	DF	GAM	Bubacarr Sanneh	8 (4)	1	1	0	5 (1)	0	14 (5)	1	1	0
5	DF	UKR	Yevhen Makarenko	13 (2)	0	1	0	3 (1)	0	17 (3)	0	6	0
7	MF	HON	Andy Najar	21 (4)	0	1	0	2 (2)	0	24 (6)	0	5	0
8	MF	BEL	Pieter Gerkens	22 (10)	7	1	0	3 (1)	0	26 (11)	7	2	0
9	FW	BEL	Landry Dimata *	17 (3)	13	1	0	3	0	21 (3)	13	1	0
10	MF	JPN	Ryota Morioka	4 (2)	0	1	0	2 (1)	0	7 (3)	0	2	0
11	FW	ZIM	~~Knowledge Musona~~ †	3 (5)	1	0	0	2	0	5 (5)	1	0	0
11	FW	COD	Yannick Bolasie *	16 (1)	6	0	0	0	0	16 (1)	6	5	0
12	DF	FRA	Dennis Appiah	15 (4)	0	0	0	2	0	17 (4)	0	3	0
15	MF	USA	Kenny Saief	2 (10)	0	0	0	3 (2)	0	5 (12)	0	0	0
16	GK	FRA	Thomas Didillon	40	0	0	0	5	0	45	0	1	0
17	MF	SRB	Luka Adžić	0	0	0	0	0	0	0	0	0	0
19	FW	CRO	Ivan Santini	27 (7)	16	0 (1)	0	4	0	31 (8)	16	10	0
20	MF	BEL	Sven Kums	30 (1)	5	1	0	3	0	34 (1)	5	11	0
22	DF	BEL	Elias Cobbaut	10 (2)	0	0	0	0	0	10 (2)	0	0	0
24	FW	SWE	Isaac Kiese Thelin	0	0	0	0	0	0	0	0	0	0
25	MF	FRA	Adrien Trebel	23 (2)	3	0	0	4	0	27 (2)	3	3	0
27	MF	AUT	Peter Žulj	8 (2)	0	0	0	0	0	8 (2)	0	1	0
30	GK	NED	Boy de Jong	0	0	0	0	0	0	0	0	0	0
32	MF	BEL	Leander Dendoncker	0	0	0	0	0	0	0	0	0	0
37	DF	SRB	Ivan Obradović	9 (1)	0	0	0	0	0	9 (1)	0	1	0
38	FW	GHA	Dauda Mohammed	1 (4)	0	0	0	1 (1)	0	2 (5)	0	0	0
39	MF	COD	Edo Kayembe	6 (6)	0	1	0	2	0	9 (6)	0	1	0
40	FW	BEL	Francis Amuzu	19 (11)	1	0 (1)	0	2 (2)	0	21 (14)	1	3	1
41	DF	GHA	Emmanuel Sowah	0	0	0	0	0	0	0	0	0	0
42	DF	BEL	Hannes Delcroix	0 (1)	0	0	0	0 (1)	0	0 (2)	0	0	0
44	DF	CRO	Antonio Milić	16 (5)	0	0	0	4	0	20 (5)	0	5	1
45	DF	BEL	Sebastiaan Bornauw	22 (1)	1	1	0	4	0	27 (1)	1	6	1
47	DF	MLI	Abdoul Karim Danté	0	0	0	0	0	0	0	0	0	0
48	FW	BEL	Albert Sambi Lokonga	5 (1)	0	0	0	0 (2)	0	5 (3)	0	2	0
49	FW	BEL	Jérémy Doku	0 (6)	0	0	0	0	0	0 (6)	0	0	0
50	MF	BEL	Sieben Dewaele	0	0	0	0	0	0	0	0	0	0
51	MF	BEL	Yari Verschaeren	19 (2)	2	0	0	0 (1)	0	19 (3)	2	0	0
52	GK	MAR	Ilias Moutha-Sebtaoui	0	0	0	0	0	0	0	0	0	0
55	DF	BIH	Ognjen Vranješ	10	0	1	0	3	0	14	0	4	2
56	MF	BEL	Alexis Saelemaekers	22 (8)	0	0 (1)	0	2 (1)	0	24 (10)	0	6	1
60	FW	CIV	Olivier Dhauholou	0	0	0	0	0	0	0	0	0	0
77	MF	ALB	Kristal Abazaj	0 (1)	0	0	0	0	0	0 (1)	0	0	0
91	FW	POL	~~Łukasz Teodorczyk~~ †	0	0	0	0	0	0	0	0	0	0
99	MF	BEL	Zakaria Bakkali	13 (5)	1	0	0	4	2	17 (5)	3	7	1

== See also ==
- 2018–19 in Belgian football
- 2018–19 Belgian First Division A
- 2018–19 Belgian Cup
- 2018–19 UEFA Europa League
