= Pieter Gerkens =

Belgian footballer

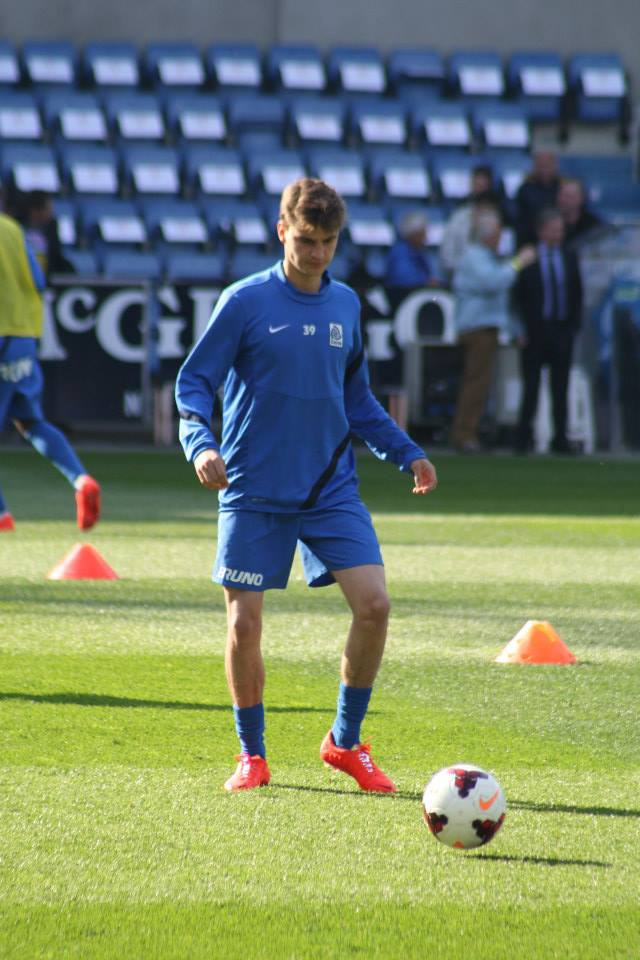
- Gerkens with Genk

Personal information
- Full name: Pieter Tom Gerkens
- Date of birth: 13 August 1995 (age 31)
- Place of birth: Bilzen, Belgium
- Height: 1.79 m (5 ft 10 in)
- Position: Defensive midfielder

Team information
- Current team: Gent

Youth career
- 2001–2013: Genk

Senior career*
Years	Team	Apps	(Gls)
2013–2015	Genk	34	(2)
2016–2017	Sint-Truiden	50	(16)
2017–2020	Anderlecht	73	(11)
2020–2023	Antwerp	82	(6)
2023–	Gent	51	(5)
2025–2026	→ Cercle Brugge (loan)	35	(6)

International career
2011	Belgium U16	1	(0)
2011–2012	Belgium U17	9	(1)
2012–2013	Belgium U18	6	(0)
2013–2014	Belgium U19	13	(2)
2014	Belgium U21	1	(0)
- * Club domestic league appearances and goals as of 11 May 2026

Pieter Tom Gerkens (born 13 August 1995) is a Belgian professional footballer who plays as a defensive midfielder for Belgian Pro League club Gent.

== Career ==
Gerkens made his professional debut for Genk at 28 November 2013 in a UEFA Europa League game against Dynamo Kyiv as an 88th-minute substitute. At 1 December 2013, he made his league debut against Oud-Heverlee Leuven. Three days later, he was a starter in the Belgian Cup against Mechelen. After 61 minutes, he was replaced for Anthony Limbombe.

On 12 June 2023, Gerkens signed a four-year contract with Gent.

For the 2025–26 season, Gerkens joined Cercle Brugge on loan with an option to buy.

== Career statistics ==
=== Club ===
As of match played 9 March 2025

Appearances and goals by club, season and competition
Club	Season	League			Cup		Continental		Other		Total	
Club	Season	Division	Apps	Goals	Apps	Goals	Apps	Goals	Apps	Goals	Apps	Goals
Genk	2013–14	Belgian First Division A	13	1	1	0	2	0	—		16	1
Genk	2014–15	Belgian First Division A	19	1	1	0	—		—		20	1
Genk	2015–16	Belgian First Division A	2	0	0	0	—		—		2	0
Genk	Total		34	2	2	0	2	0	—		38	2
Sint-Truiden	2015–16	Belgian Pro League	12	2	—		—		—		12	2
Sint-Truiden	2016–17	Belgian First Division A	38	14	1	0	—		—		39	14
Sint-Truiden	Total		50	16	1	0	—		—		51	16
Anderlecht	2017–18	Belgian First Division A	34	4	1	0	5	0	1	0	41	4
Anderlecht	2018–19	Belgian First Division A	32	7	1	0	4	0	—		37	7
Anderlecht	2019–20	Belgian First Division A	7	0	—		—		—		7	0
Anderlecht	Total		73	11	2	0	9	0	1	0	85	11
Antwerp	2020–21	Belgian First Division A	37	3	2	0	7	2	—		46	5
Antwerp	2021–22	Belgian First Division A	26	2	1	0	7	2	—		34	4
Antwerp	2022–23	Belgian Pro League	19	1	1	0	5	0	—		25	1
Antwerp	Total		82	6	4	0	19	4	—		105	10
Gent	2023–24	Belgian Pro League	32	4	2	0	11	1	—		45	5
Gent	2024–25	Belgian Pro League	19	1	1	1	4	0	—		24	2
Gent	Total		51	5	3	1	15	1	—		69	7
Career total			290	40	12	1	45	5	1	0	348	46
