= Eman, Akwa Ibom =

Eman
- Village
- Country: Nigeria
- State: Akwa Ibom
- Local Government Area: Uruan

Eman is a village in the Uruan local government area of Akwa Ibom State, Nigeria. The Ibibio people are occupants of the Eman village.
