= Ortwin De Wolf =

Belgian footballer (born 1997)

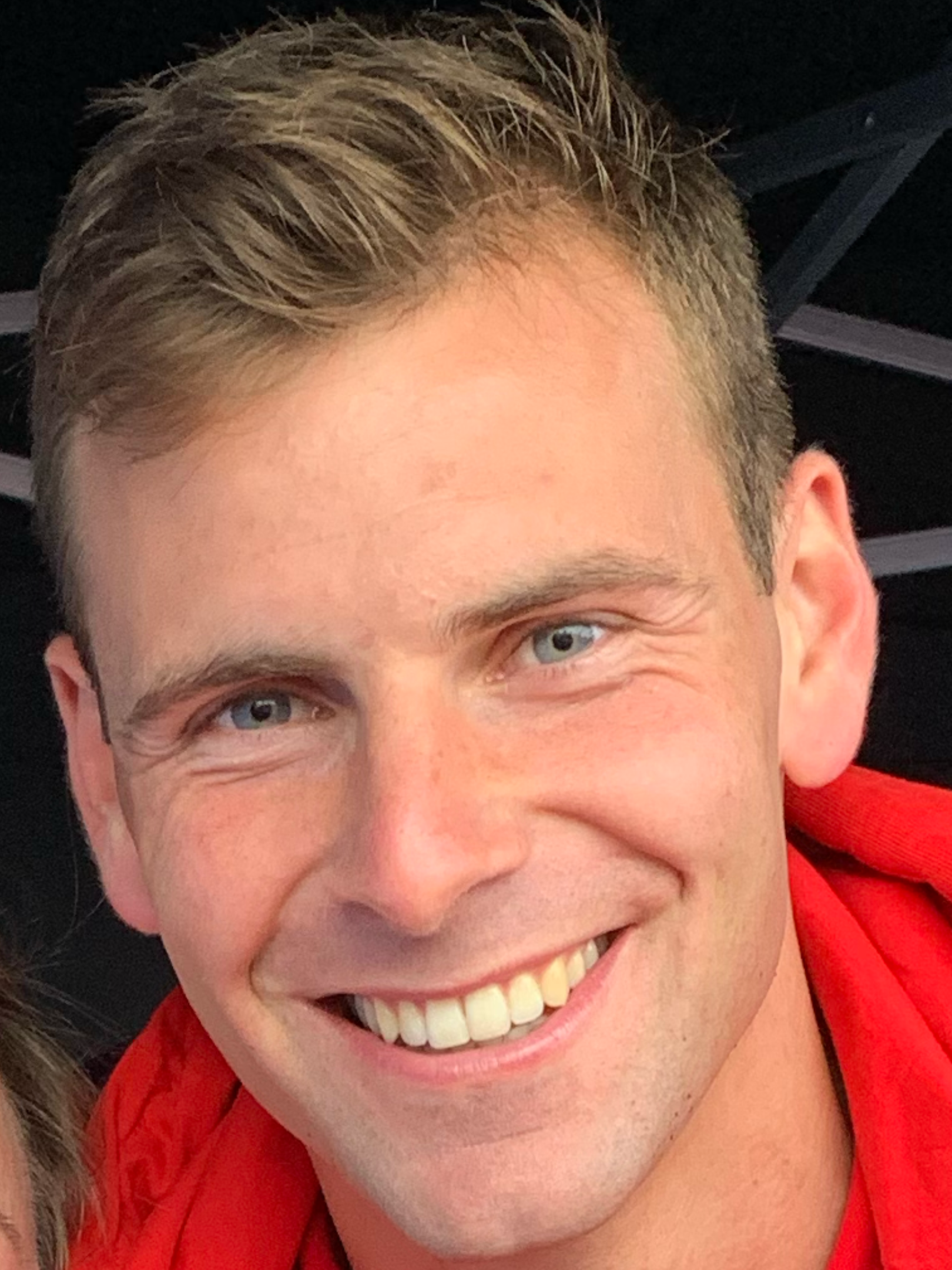

Personal information
- Date of birth: 23 April 1997 (age 29)
- Place of birth: Lokeren, Belgium
- Height: 1.90 m (6 ft 3 in)
- Position: Goalkeeper

Team information
- Current team: Mechelen
- Number: 1

Senior career*
Years	Team	Apps	(Gls)
2017–2019	Lokeren	28	(0)
2019–2021	Eupen	40	(0)
2021	→ Antwerp (loan)	7	(0)
2021–2024	Antwerp	0	(0)
2022–2023	Young Reds	8	(0)
2024	Zulte Waregem	16	(0)
2024–	Mechelen	47	(0)

International career^{‡}
2018–2019	Belgium U21	4	(0)
- * Club domestic league appearances and goals as of 31 May 2026 ‡ National team caps and goals as of 07:21, 23 June 2019 (UTC)

Ortwin De Wolf (born 23 April 1997) is a Belgian professional footballer who plays as a goalkeeper for Belgian Pro League club Mechelen. He previously played for Lokeren, Eupen, Antwerp and Zulte Waregem.

== Club career ==
Ortwin De Wolf started his career with Lokeren. He moved to Eupen on 20 July 2019.

On 5 July 2021, he moved to Antwerp on a permanent basis after playing for them on loan in the previous season and signed a three-year contract.

On 9 January 2024, De Wolf signed with Zulte Waregem.

On 28 June 2024, De Wolf joined Mechelen on a three-year deal.

== International career ==
In October 2024 he was named in the senior Belgium squad for the 2024–25 UEFA Nations League matches against Italy and France on 10 and 14 October 2024, respectively.

== Honours ==
Royal Antwerp

- Belgian Cup: 2022–23
