= Didier Lamkel Zé =

Cameroonian footballer

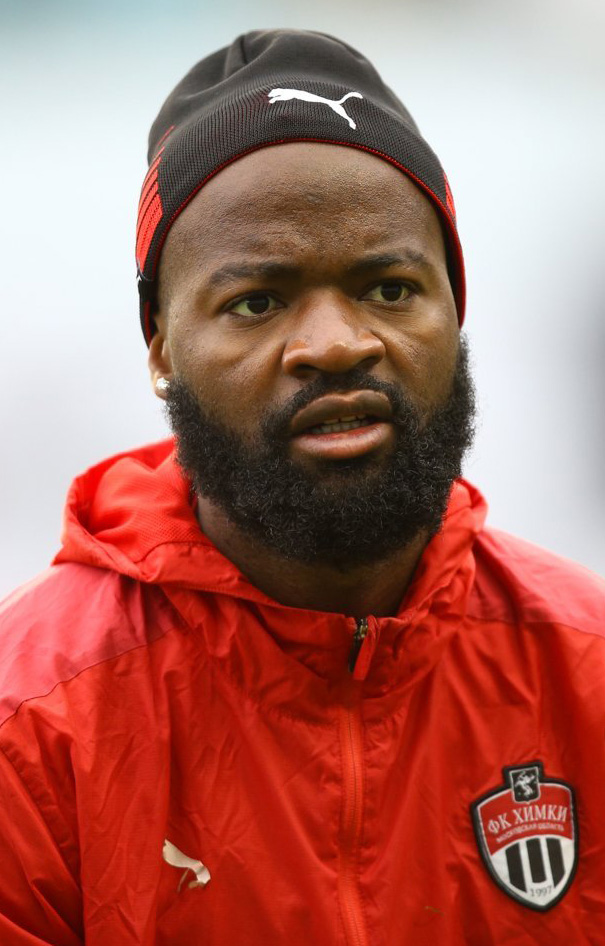
- Lamkel Zé with Khimki in 2022

Personal information
- Full name: Didier Lamkel Zé
- Date of birth: 17 September 1996 (age 30)
- Place of birth: Bertoua, Cameroon
- Height: 1.92 m (6 ft 4 in)
- Position: Forward

Team information
- Current team: Kazma SC

Youth career
- EFBC
- 2014–2016: Lille

Senior career*
Years	Team	Apps	(Gls)
2015–2016	Lille B	6	(1)
2016–2018	Niort	55	(10)
2016–2018	Niort B	11	(5)
2018–2022	Antwerp	73	(18)
2021	→ Dunajská Streda (loan)	7	(2)
2022	→ Khimki (loan)	3	(2)
2022	→ Metz (loan)	9	(3)
2022–2023	Kortrijk	10	(1)
2023	→ Wydad Casablanca (loan)	3	(0)
2023–2024	Hatayspor	16	(3)
2024	→ Metz (loan)	11	(1)
2024	Sakaryaspor	0	(0)
2024	Fatih Karagümrük	10	(3)
2025	Sint-Truiden	11	(4)
2025	Qingdao Hainiu	12	(7)
2026–	Kazma SC	0	(0)

International career
2019	Cameroon	1	(0)
- * Club domestic league appearances and goals as of 11 May 2025

Didier Lamkel Zé (born 17 September 1996) is a Cameroonian professional footballer who plays as a forward for Kuwait Premier League club Kazma SC.

== Club career ==
=== Chamois Niortais ===
After joining the Lille youth academy from Cameroonian club L'École de Football Brasseries du Cameroun (EFBC), Lamkel Zé progressed through its youth teams. In the summer of 2016, he moved to Chamois Niortais and ended up in the first team. Lamkel Zé made his Ligue 2 debut on 29 July 2016 in the 0–0 draw with RC Lens, coming on as a substitute for Romain Grange late in the match. He scored his first senior goal the following week, the equaliser in a 1–1 draw with Stade Lavallois.

=== Royal Antwerp ===
On 24 July 2018, Lamkel Zé joined Belgian First Division A side Antwerp on a four-year deal with the option of a fifth year.

In December 2020, Lamkel Zé was linked to a move to Greek club Panathinaikos to play under former Antwerp manager László Bölöni. To push for the move, Lamkel Zé showed up to training in early January 2021 wearing a shirt of Antwerp's rival, Anderlecht. On 6 January 2021, following a public outrage, Lamkel Zé apologized and issued a public statement re-committing to Antwerp.

==== Loan to Dunajská Streda ====
On 6 September 2021, Lamkel Zé signed a one-year loan with Fortuna Liga club Dunajská Streda.

==== Loan to Khimki ====
On 7 February 2022, Lamkel Zé joined Russian Premier League club Khimki on loan. The loan was terminated early due to the Russian invasion of Ukraine.

==== Loan to Metz ====
According to the special rules introduced by FIFA due to the war, foreign players with Russian clubs were allowed to sign a short-term contract with non-Russian clubs outside of the transfer window. On 1 April 2022, Lamkel Zé moved to Metz on loan under those conditions.

=== Kortrijk ===
On 23 August 2022, Lamkel Zé signed a three-year contract with Kortrijk.

=== Hatayspor ===
On 8 August 2023 he signed a 2-year contract with Süper Lig club Hatayspor.

=== Sint-Truiden ===
On 8 January 2025, Lamkel Zé signed with Sint-Truiden in Belgium.

=== Kazma SC ===
On 22 January 2026, Lamkel Zé signed with Kuwait Premier League club Kazma SC.

== Career statistics ==
As of match played 2 June 2024

Appearances and goals by club, season and competition
Club	Season	League			National cup		Continental		Other		Total	
Club	Season	Division	Apps	Goals	Apps	Goals	Apps	Goals	Apps	Goals	Apps	Goals
Lille B	2015–16	Championnat de France Amateur 2	6	1	—		—		—		6	1
Niort	2016–17	Ligue 2	24	3	2	0	—		1 (Note: Appearance in the Coupe de la Ligue)	0	27	3
Niort	2017–18	Ligue 2	31	7	3	1	—		1	0	35	8
Niort	Total		55	10	5	1	—		2	0	62	11
Niort B	2016–17	Championnat de France Amateur 2	5	2	—		—		—		5	2
Niort B	2017–18	Championnat National 3	6	3	—		—		—		6	3
Niort B	Total		11	5	—		—		—		11	5
Antwerp	2018–19	Belgian First Division A	27	4	1	0	—		1 (Note: Appearance in the Belgian First Division A Europa League play-off final)	0	29	4
Antwerp	2019–20	Belgian First Division A	25	6	6	0	4 (Note: Appearances in the UEFA Europa League)	1	—		35	7
Antwerp	2020–21	Belgian First Division A	21	8	2	1	1	1	—		24	10
Antwerp	Total		73	18	9	1	5	2	1	0	88	21
Dunajská Streda (loan)	2021–22	Slovak Super Liga	7	2	0	0	0	0	—		7	2
Khimki (loan)	2021–22	Russian Premier League	3	2	0	0	—		—		3	2
Metz (loan)	2021–22	Ligue 1	9	3	—		—		—		9	3
Kortrijk	2022–23	Belgian Pro League	10	1	0	0	—		—		10	1
Wydad AC (loan)	2022–23	Botola	3	0	0	0	2 (Note: Appearances in the CAF Champions League)	0	1 (Note: Appearance in the FIFA Club World Cup)	0	6	0
Hatayspor	2023–24	Süper Lig	15	3	1	0	—		—		16	3
Metz (loan)	2023–24	Ligue 1	9	1	0	0	—		2 (Note: Appearances in the Ligue 1 relegation/promotion play-offs)	0	11	1
Career total			201	45	15	2	7	2	6	0	229	49

=== International ===
As of match played 13 November 2019

Appearances and goals by national team and year
National team	Year	Apps	Goals
Cameroon	2019	1	0
Total		1	0

== Honours ==
Antwerp

- Belgian Cup: 2019–20
