= Robbe Quirynen =

Belgian football player

Personal information
- Date of birth: 3 November 2001 (age 25)
- Place of birth: Malle, Belgium
- Height: 1.82 m (6 ft 0 in)
- Position: Defender

Team information
- Current team: Dessel
- Number: 22

Youth career
- 2007–2016: Sint-Job FC
- 2016–2017: Cappellen
- 2017–2019: Antwerp

Senior career*
Years	Team	Apps	(Gls)
2019–2022	Antwerp	5	(0)
2020–2021	→ Mouscron (loan)	9	(0)
2022	Deinze	11	(1)
2022–2024	Beerschot	7	(0)
2022–2023	Beerschot U23	8	(0)
2024–	Dessel	15	(1)

International career^{‡}
2019	Belgium U18	2	(0)
2019–2020	Belgium U19	5	(0)
- * Club domestic league appearances and goals as of 6 May 2025 ‡ National team caps and goals as of 20 February 2020

Robbe Quirynen (born 3 November 2001) is a Belgian professional footballer who plays as a defender for Dessel.

== Club career ==
He made his Belgian First Division A debut for Antwerp on 4 August 2019 in a game against Waasland-Beveren.

On 27 January 2022, Quirynen signed with Deinze until the end of the 2021–22 season.

On 10 April 2022, Quirynen signed a two-year deal with Beerschot.

On 29 June 2024, Quirynen moved to Dessel on a one-season contract.

== Honours ==
Antwerp

- Belgian Cup: 2019–20
