= Junior Pius =

Nigerian footballer

Personal information
- Full name: Junior Udeme Pius
- Date of birth: 20 December 1995 (age 30)
- Place of birth: Eman, Nigeria
- Height: 1.93 m (6 ft 4 in)
- Position: Centre-back

Team information
- Current team: Maccabi Bnei Reineh
- Number: 40

Youth career
- 2013–2014: Porto

Senior career*
Years	Team	Apps	(Gls)
2014–2015	Porto B	0	(0)
2014–2015	→ Aves (loan)	7	(0)
2015–2016	Cesarense	23	(1)
2016–2017	Sanjoanense	31	(4)
2017–2018	Tondela	3	(0)
2018–2019	Paços Ferreira	29	(3)
2019–2022	Antwerp	6	(2)
2021–2022	→ Sint-Truiden (loan)	14	(0)
2023–2024	Botoșani	26	(0)
2024–2025	Chaves	33	(1)
2025–	Maccabi Bnei Reineh	16	(0)
- * Club domestic league appearances and goals as of 22:10, 5 March 2026 (UTC)

Junior Udeme Pius (born 20 December 1995) is a Nigerian professional footballer who plays as a centre-back for Israeli Premier League club Maccabi Bnei Reineh.

== Club career ==
Born in Eman, Akwa Ibom, Pius finished his development in Portugal with FC Porto. On 1 September 2014, he was loaned to C.D. Aves to kickstart his senior career, making his Segunda Liga debut on 5 October in a 0–0 away draw against C.D. Santa Clara where he was sent off for two late bookable offences.

Released by Porto at the end of the season, Pius took his game to the Portuguese third division, representing in quick succession F.C. Cesarense and A.D. Sanjoanense. In the summer of 2017 he moved straight to the Primeira Liga, signing a three-year contract with C.D. Tondela. He played his first game in the latter competition on 16 September, when he came on as a 31st-minute substitute in a 2–0 away loss to Sporting CP.

In December 2017, while nursing a serious anterior cruciate ligament injury to his right knee contracted in a friendly against S.C. Covilhã two months earlier, Pius was caught stealing from a fund containing player fines of various types, this allegedly being the third time the incident had occurred with him. He was immediately suspended by the club, also being forbidden from attending its facilities.

Pius joined second-tier side F.C. Paços de Ferreira on 10 August 2018. He helped them to win promotion as champions, contributing three goals to this feat.

On 28 June 2019, Pius agreed to a four-year deal at Belgian Pro League's Royal Antwerp FC, with an option for a further year. In February 2021, after failing to make an impact, he was sent on loan to fellow top-flight Sint-Truidense V.V. until 30 June, with a buying option; the move was extended for the entire 2021–22 campaign, and his contract was terminated at its closure.

On 8 March 2023, after six months as a free agent, Pius joined Romanian Liga I club FC Botoșani. He returned to Portugal and its main division in January 2024, on a six-month contract with G.D. Chaves that could be renewed for another year.

== Honours ==
Paços de Ferreira

- LigaPro: 2018–19

Antwerp

- Belgian Cup: 2019–20
