= Frank Boya =

Cameroonian footballer

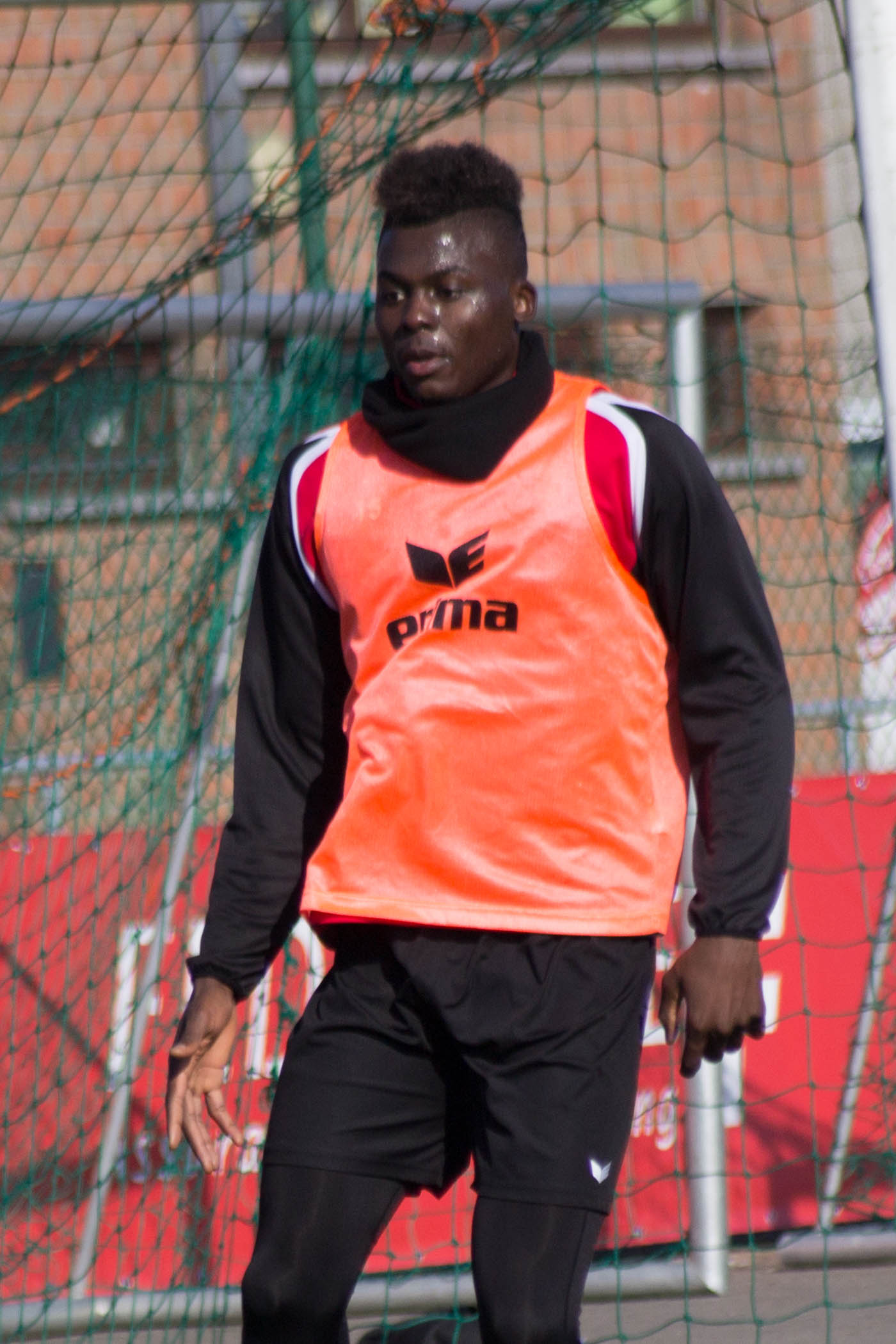

Personal information
- Full name: Frank Thierry Boya
- Date of birth: 1 July 1996 (age 30)
- Place of birth: Douala, Cameroon
- Height: 1.94 m (6 ft 4 in)
- Position: Midfielder

Team information
- Current team: Tijuana
- Number: 34

Senior career*
| Years | Team | Apps | (Gls) |
| 2015–2017 | APEJES Academy | | |
| 2017 | 1860 Munich | 0 | (0) |
| 2017–2020 | Mouscron | 54 | (5) |
| 2020–2023 | Antwerp | 13 | (0) |
| 2021–2022 | → Zulte Waregem | 17 | (0) |
| 2022–2023 | → Sint-Truiden (loan) | 31 | (1) |
| 2023–2025 | Amiens | 50 | (1) |
| 2025– | Tijuana | 37 | (8) |

International career^{‡}
| 2016–2017 | Cameroon | 6 | (0) |
Medal record
Men's football
Representing Cameroon
Africa Cup of Nations
| Winner | 2017 Gabon |
- * Club domestic league appearances and goals as of 20:56, 22 November 2026 (UTC) ‡ National team caps and goals as of 11:43, 2 July 2020 (UTC)

Frank Thierry Boya (born 1 July 1996) is a Cameroonian professional footballer who plays as a midfielder for Mexican Liga MX club Tijuana.

== Club career ==
Born in Douala, Boya began his career with APEJES Academy. During the winter break of the 2016–17 season he transferred to German 2. Bundesliga club 1860 Munich.

In 2017, he joined Belgian club Mouscron. In June 2020 he signed for Antwerp.

On 31 August 2021, Boya was moved on loan to Zulte Waregem. On 24 June 2022, Boya agreed on a new loan to Sint-Truiden.

On 1 September 2023, Boya signed a three-year contract with Amiens in France.

On 5 February 2025, Boya moved to Tijuana in Mexico.

== International career ==
Boya made his international debut in 2016, and was named in the squad for the 2017 Africa Cup of Nations.

== Honours ==
Cameroon

- Africa Cup of Nations: 2017
