= Bill Lathouwers =

Belgian footballer (born 1999)

Personal information
- Date of birth: 18 September 1999 (age 27)
- Place of birth: Wilrijk, Belgium
- Height: 1.92 m (6 ft 4 in)
- Position: Goalkeeper

Team information
- Current team: Westerlo
- Number: 1

Youth career
- –2018: Antwerp

Senior career*
Years	Team	Apps	(Gls)
2018–2020	Antwerp	0	(0)
2020–2021	MVV	9	(0)
2021–2022	Waasland-Beveren	1	(0)
2022–2024	Beerschot	28	(0)
2024–2026	RWDM Brussels	52	(0)
2026–	Westerlo	0	(0)
- * Club domestic league appearances and goals as of 15 August 2026

Bill Lathouwers (born 18 September 1999) is a Belgian professional footballer who plays as a goalkeeper for Belgian Pro League club Westerlo.

== Career ==
Lathouwers played in the youth and for the reserves of Royal Antwerp. In the 2019–20 season, he was once included in the first team squad of Antwerp, in the cup final which they won 0–1 over Club Brugge. In 2020, he left for Dutch second-tier club MVV Maastricht after a successful trial period, signing a contract on an amateur basis. He made his debut for MVV on 30 August 2020, in a 0–0 away draw against Almere City.

On 22 January 2021, he signed a one-and-a-half-year contract with Waasland-Beveren.

On 18 June 2024, Lathouwers signed a contract for two seasons (with an optional third) with RWD Molenbeek.

On 30 June 2026, Bill moved to top-tier club Westerlo.

== Honours ==
Royal Antwerp

- Belgian Cup: 2019–20

== Career statistics ==
=== Club ===
As of 9 September 2020.

Club	Season	League			Cup		Continental		Other		Total	
Club	Season	Division	Apps	Goals	Apps	Goals	Apps	Goals	Apps	Goals	Apps	Goals
MVV Maastricht	2020–21	Eerste Divisie	9	0	0	0	–		0	0	9	0
Career total			9	0	0	0	0	0	0	0	9	0
