= Dylan Batubinsika =

Footballer (born 1996)

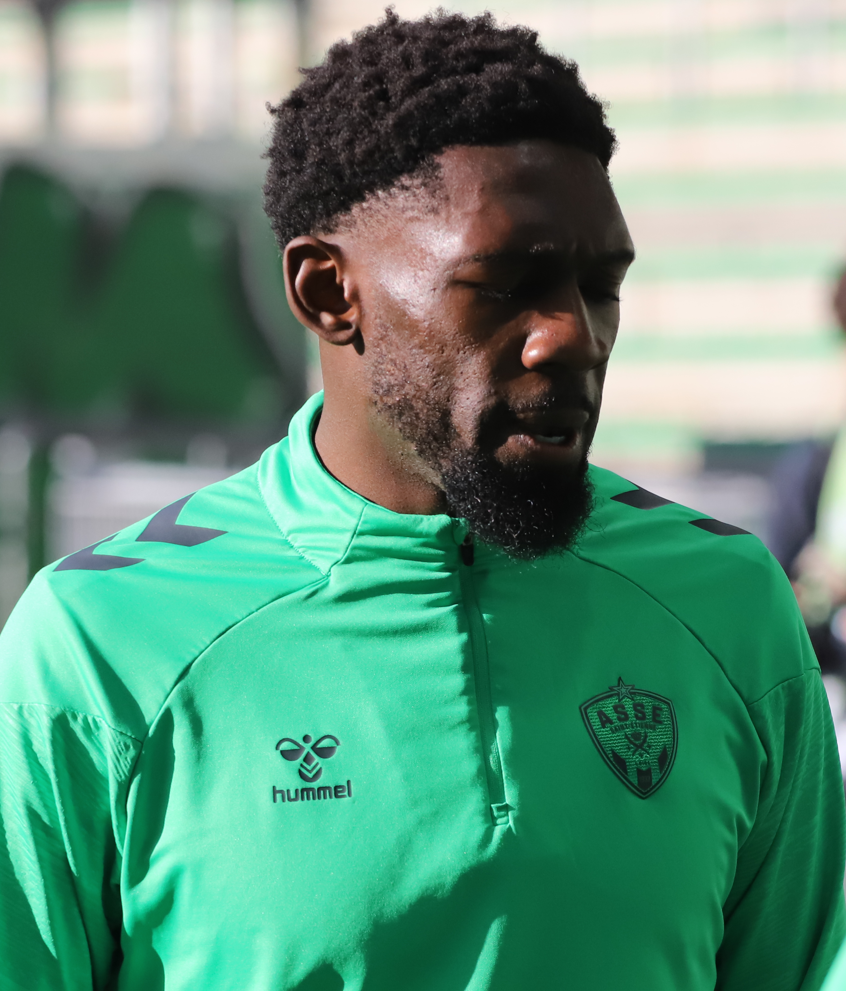

Personal information
- Full name: Buduka Dylan Batubinsika
- Date of birth: 15 February 1996 (age 30)
- Place of birth: Cergy-Pontoise, France
- Height: 1.85 m (6 ft 1 in)
- Position: Centre-back

Team information
- Current team: FCSB
- Number: 21

Youth career
- 2003–2004: US Cergy Clos
- 2004–2015: Paris Saint-Germain

Senior career*
Years	Team	Apps	(Gls)
2014–2017	Paris Saint-Germain B	52	(2)
2017–2021	Antwerp	73	(3)
2021–2023	Famalicão	22	(1)
2022–2023	→ Maccabi Haifa (loan)	25	(2)
2023–2026	Saint-Étienne	53	(2)
2025–2026	Saint-Étienne B	4	(1)
2026	AEL	16	(0)
2026–	FCSB	8	(0)

International career^{‡}
2011	France U16	5	(0)
2016	France U20	5	(1)
2023–	DR Congo	16	(1)
- * Club domestic league appearances and goals as of 24 October 2026 ‡ National team caps and goals as of 25 March 2026

Buduka Dylan Batubinsika (born 15 February 1996) is a professional footballer who plays as a centre-back for Liga I club FCSB. Born in France, he plays for the DR Congo national team.

== Club career ==
Batubinska played as a youngster for Paris Saint-Germain Academy. In 2014 he began playing for the club's reserve team, capping 52 times and scoring twice.

On 13 July 2017, Batubinsika joined Antwerp from the Belgian First Division A. During his 4-year spell with the club he capped 73 times and scored 3 goals, and won the 2019–20 Belgian Cup.

On 23 July 2021, he signed a four-year contract with Portuguese top-tier Primeira Liga club Famalicão.

On 31 August 2022, Batubinsika was loaned to Israeli top-tier Ligat Ha'Al club Maccabi Haifa for the rest of the 2022–23 season, with an option to make the signing permanent. On 3 September 2022 he made his debut for the club in a 2–1 victory over Hapoel Be'er Sheva.

On 21 July 2023, Ligue 2 side Saint-Étienne announced the signing of Batubinsika on a two-year deal, for an undisclosed fee.

On 26 January 2026, Batubinsika joined Super League Greece club AEL on a six-month contract.

== International career ==
Born in France, Batubinsika is of DR Congolese descent. He was called up to the DR Congo national team for 5. Matchday in Africa Cup of Nations qualifiers in June 2023.

On 27 December 2023, he was selected from the list of 24 Congolese players selected by Sébastien Desabre to compete in the 2023 Africa Cup of Nations.

On May 19, 2026, he was included in the 26-man squad selected by head coach Sébastien Desabre to represent the DR Congo at the 2026 FIFA World Cup.

== Career statistics ==
=== Club ===
As of match played 29 October 2026

Appearances and goals by club, season and competition
Club	Season	League			National cup (Note: Includes Belgian Cup, Taça de Portugal, Israel State Cup, Coupe de France)		League cup (Note: Includes Taça da Liga)		Europe		Other		Total	
Club	Season	Division	Apps	Goals	Apps	Goals	Apps	Goals	Apps	Goals	Apps	Goals	Apps	Goals
PSG B	2013–14	CFA	1	0	—		—		—		—		1	0
PSG B	2014–15	CFA	8	1	—		—		—		—		8	1
PSG B	2015–16	CFA	20	0	—		—		—		—		20	0
PSG B	2016–17	CFA	23	1	—		—		—		—		23	1
PSG B	Total		52	2	—		—		—		—		52	2
Antwerp	2017–18	Belgian First Division A	32	0	1	0	—		—		—		33	0
Antwerp	2018–19	Belgian First Division A]	11	0	1	0	—		—		—		12	0
Antwerp	2019–20	Belgian First Division A]	4	0	1	0	—		4 (Note: Appearances in UEFA Europa League)	1	—		9	1
Antwerp	2020–21	Belgian First Division A]	26	3	2	0	—		3	0	—		31	2
Antwerp	Total		73	3	5	0	—		7	1	—		85	4
Famalicão	2021–22	Primeira Liga	20	1	1	0	2	0	—		—		23	1
Famalicão	2022–23	Primeira Liga	2	0	—		—		—		—		2	0
Famalicão	Total		22	1	1	0	2	0	—		—		25	1
Maccabi Haifa (loan)	2022–23	Israeli Premier League	25	2	3	0	0	0	5 (Note: Appearances in UEFA Champions League)	0	—		33	2
Saint-Étienne	2023–24	Ligue 2	27	1	0	0	—		—		2 (Note: Appearances in Ligue 1 promotion/relegation play-offs)	0	29	1
Saint-Étienne	2024–25	Ligue 1	25	1	1	0	—		—		—		26	1
Saint-Étienne	2025–26	Ligue 2	1	0	—		—		—		—		1	0
Saint-Étienne	Total		53	2	1	0	—		—		2	0	56	2
Saint-Étienne B	2025–26	Championnat National 3	4	1	—		—		—		—		4	1
AEL	2025–26	Super League Greece	16	0	—		—		—		—		16	0
FCSB	2026–27	Liga I	8	0	1	0	—		0	0	—		9	0
Career Total			253	11	11	0	2	0	12	1	2	0	280	12

=== International ===
As of match played 25 March 2026

Appearances and goals by national team and year
National team	Year	Apps	Goals
DR Congo	2023	4	0
DR Congo	2024	6	1
DR Congo	2025	5	0
DR Congo	2026	1	0
Total		16	1

Scores and results list DR Congo's goal tally first, score column indicates score after each Batubinsika goal.

List of international goals scored by Dylan Batubinsika
No.	Date	Venue	Opponent	Score	Result	Competition
1	19 November 2024	Stade des Martyrs, Kinshasa, DR Congo	Ethiopia	1–1	1–2	2025 Africa Cup of Nations qualification

== Honours ==
Antwerp

- Belgian Cup: 2019–20

Maccabi Haifa

- Israeli Premier League: 2022–23
