= Simen Juklerød =

Norwegian footballer (born 1994)

Personal information
- Full name: Simen Kristiansen Juklerød
- Date of birth: 18 May 1994 (age 32)
- Place of birth: Bærum, Norway
- Height: 1.86 m (6 ft 1 in)
- Position: Midfielder

Team information
- Current team: DAC Dunajská Streda
- Number: 18

Youth career
- Jutul
- 2004–2012: Bærum

Senior career*
Years	Team	Apps	(Gls)
2013–2015	Bærum	74	(8)
2016–2018	Vålerenga	51	(8)
2018–2021	Antwerp	72	(4)
2021–2022	Genk	11	(0)
2022–2025	Vålerenga	56	(2)
2025–2026	Sint-Truiden	30	(1)
2026–	DAC Dunajská Streda	3	(0)
- * Club domestic league appearances and goals as of 16 August 2026

Simen Kristiansen Juklerød (born 18 May 1994) is a Norwegian professional footballer who plays as a midfielder for Slovak club DAC Dunajská Streda.

== Career ==
Juklerød started his youth career in IL Jutul, but joined Bærum SK at the age of ten. He progressed to the junior team and attended Dønski Upper Secondary School in Bærum's own training class. He broke into the senior team in 2013, and featured in the 2015 Norwegian First Division which ended with relegation. After the season, he was signed by first-tier club Vålerenga. He made his Norwegian Premier League debut in March 2016, playing one half against Sogndal. On 17 July 2018 Juklerød signed for Belgium side Royal Antwerp.

On 31 August 2022, Juklerød returned to Vålerenga and signed a contract for the term of 4.5 years.

On 16 January 2025, Simen returned to Belgium and joined Sint-Truiden.

On 22 June 2026, Juklerød signed with DAC Dunajská Streda in Slovakia for one season.

== Career statistics ==
As of 25 September 2024

Appearances and goals by club, season and competition
Club	Season	League			National cup (Note: Including Norwegian Football Cup, Belgian Cup)		Other		Total	
Club	Season	Division	Apps	Goals	Apps	Goals	Apps	Goals	Apps	Goals
Bærum	2013	Oddsen-ligaen	23	4	0	0	—		23	4
Bærum	2014	1. divisjon	25	0	2	0	1 (Note: Appearances in the Eliteserien play-offs)	0	28	0
Bærum	2015	OBOS-ligaen	26	4	2	0	—		28	4
Bærum	Total		74	8	4	0	1	0	79	8
Vålerenga	2016	Tippeligaen	19	3	4	1	—		23	4
Vålerenga	2017	Eliteserien	21	5	4	0	—		25	5
Vålerenga	2018	Eliteserien	11	0	4	2	—		15	2
Vålerenga	Total		51	8	12	3	—		63	11
Royal Antwerp	2018–19	First Division A	39	1	0	0	1 (Note: Appearance in the First Division Championship play-offs)	0	40	1
Royal Antwerp	2019–20	First Division A	14	0	4	1	4 (Note: Appearances in the UEFA Europa League)	0	22	1
Royal Antwerp	2020–21	First Division A	19	3	0	0	6	0	25	3
Royal Antwerp	Total		72	4	4	1	11	0	87	5
Genk	2021–22	First Division A	11	0	0	0	2 (Note: One appearance in the Belgian Super Cup, and one appearance in the UEFA Europa League)	0	13	0
Vålerenga	2022	Eliteserien	9	0	0	0	—		9	0
Vålerenga	2023	Eliteserien	25	1	5	0	2	1	32	2
Vålerenga	2024	OBOS-ligaen	19	1	3	1	0	0	22	2
Vålerenga	Total		53	2	8	1	2	1	63	4
Career total			261	22	28	5	16	1	305	28

== Honours ==
Royal Antwerp

- Belgian Cup: 2019–20

Genk

- Belgian Super Cup runner-up: 2021
