= Davor Matijaš =

Croatian footballer (born 1999)

Personal information
- Date of birth: 23 August 1999 (age 27)
- Place of birth: Split, Croatia
- Height: 1.88 m (6 ft 2 in)
- Position: Goalkeeper

Team information
- Current team: Gorica
- Number: 71

Youth career
- 2008–2010: RNK Split
- 2010–2018: Hajduk Split

Senior career*
Years	Team	Apps	(Gls)
2015–2020	Hajduk Split II	24	(0)
2015	→ Omladinac Vranjic (loan)	12	(0)
2016	→ Primorac Stobreč (loan)	16	(0)
2020–2022	Royal Antwerp	0	(0)
2022–2025	Beerschot	40	(0)
2025–	Gorica	36	(0)

International career
2013	Croatia U14	2	(0)
2014	Croatia U15	2	(0)
2014–2015	Croatia U16	5	(0)
2015–2016	Croatia U17	6	(0)
2017	Croatia U18	1	(0)
2016–2017	Croatia U19	5	(0)
2018	Croatia U20	1	(0)
- * Club domestic league appearances and goals as of 15 June 2026

Davor Matijaš (born 23 August 1999) is a Croatian professional footballer who plays as a goalkeeper for Gorica.

== Club career ==
A youth academy product of Hajduk Split, Matijaš has made more than 20 appearances for club's reserve team in Druga HNL.

Matijaš joined Belgian club Royal Antwerp in January 2020. He made his professional debut on 1 August 2020 in final of 2019–20 Belgian Cup. He played all 90 minutes and kept a clean sheet in the game, as his side won 1–0 against Club Brugge.

On 20 August 2022, Matijaš joined Challenger Pro League club Beerschot on a two-year deal until June 2024.

On 23 June 2025, Matijaš returned to Croatia and signed a three-year contract with Gorica.

== International career ==
Matijaš is a former Croatian youth international. He has played for seven different age group teams of Croatia.

== Career statistics ==
=== Club ===
As of 1 August 2020

Club	Season	League			Cup		Continental		Total	
Club	Season	Division	Apps	Goals	Apps	Goals	Apps	Goals	Apps	Goals
Royal Antwerp	2019–20	Belgian First Division A	0	0	1	0	—		1	0
Royal Antwerp	2020–21	Belgian First Division A	0	0	0	0	0	0	0	0
Royal Antwerp	Total		0	0	1	0	0	0	1	0
Career total			0	0	1	0	0	0	1	0

== Honours ==
Royal Antwerp

- Belgian Cup: 2019–20
