= Bruny Nsimba =

Angolan footballer

Personal information
- Date of birth: 5 April 2000 (age 26)
- Place of birth: Bukunzao, Angola
- Height: 1.81 m (5 ft 11 in)
- Position: Winger

Team information
- Current team: Standard Liège
- Number: 77

Youth career
- 2006–2009: Anderlecht
- 2009–2011: Dender
- 2011–2013: Mechelen
- 2013–2019: Genk
- 2019–2020: Anderlecht

Senior career*
Years	Team	Apps	(Gls)
2020–2023	Antwerp	16	(1)
2023	Beveren	11	(3)
2023–2026	Dender	94	(32)
2026–	Standard Liège	0	(0)
- * Club domestic league appearances and goals as of 11 May 2026

Bruny Nsimba (born 5 April 2000) is an Angolan professional footballer who plays as a winger for Belgian Pro League club Standard Liège.

== Career ==
Nsimba made his professional debut with Antwerp in the 2020 Belgian Cup Final, a 1–0 win over Club Brugge on 1 August 2020. On 20 October 2020, Nsimba signed his first professional contract with Antwerp for three years.

On 31 January 2023, Nsimba moved to Beveren.

On 24 June 2023, Nsimba signed a two-year contract with Dender.

On 25 March 2026, Nsimba agreed to a three-year contract with Standard Liège, beginning in the 2026–27 season.

== Personal life ==
Nsimba was born in Angola to a Congolese father and Angolan mother, and moved to Belgium at the age of 2.

== Honours ==
Antwerp

- Belgian Cup: 2019–20
