= Luete Ava Dongo =

Congolese footballer (born 1996)

Personal information
- Full name: Moustapha Luete Ava Dongo
- Date of birth: 27 January 1996 (age 30)
- Place of birth: Kinshasa, Zaire
- Height: 1.90 m (6 ft 3 in)
- Position: Defender

Senior career*
Years	Team	Apps	(Gls)
2014–2018	Daring Club Motema Pembe		
2018–2020	AS Vita Club		
2020–2023	Royal Antwerp	0	(0)

International career^{‡}
2019–	DR Congo	5	(1)
- * Club domestic league appearances and goals ‡ National team caps and goals as of 27 January 2020

Moustapha Luete Ava Dongo (born 27 January 1996) is a Congolese professional footballer who plays as a defender.

== Honours ==
Antwerp

- Belgian Cup: 2019–20
