= Bosuilstadion =

Association football stadium in Antwerp, Belgium

- Den Bosuil
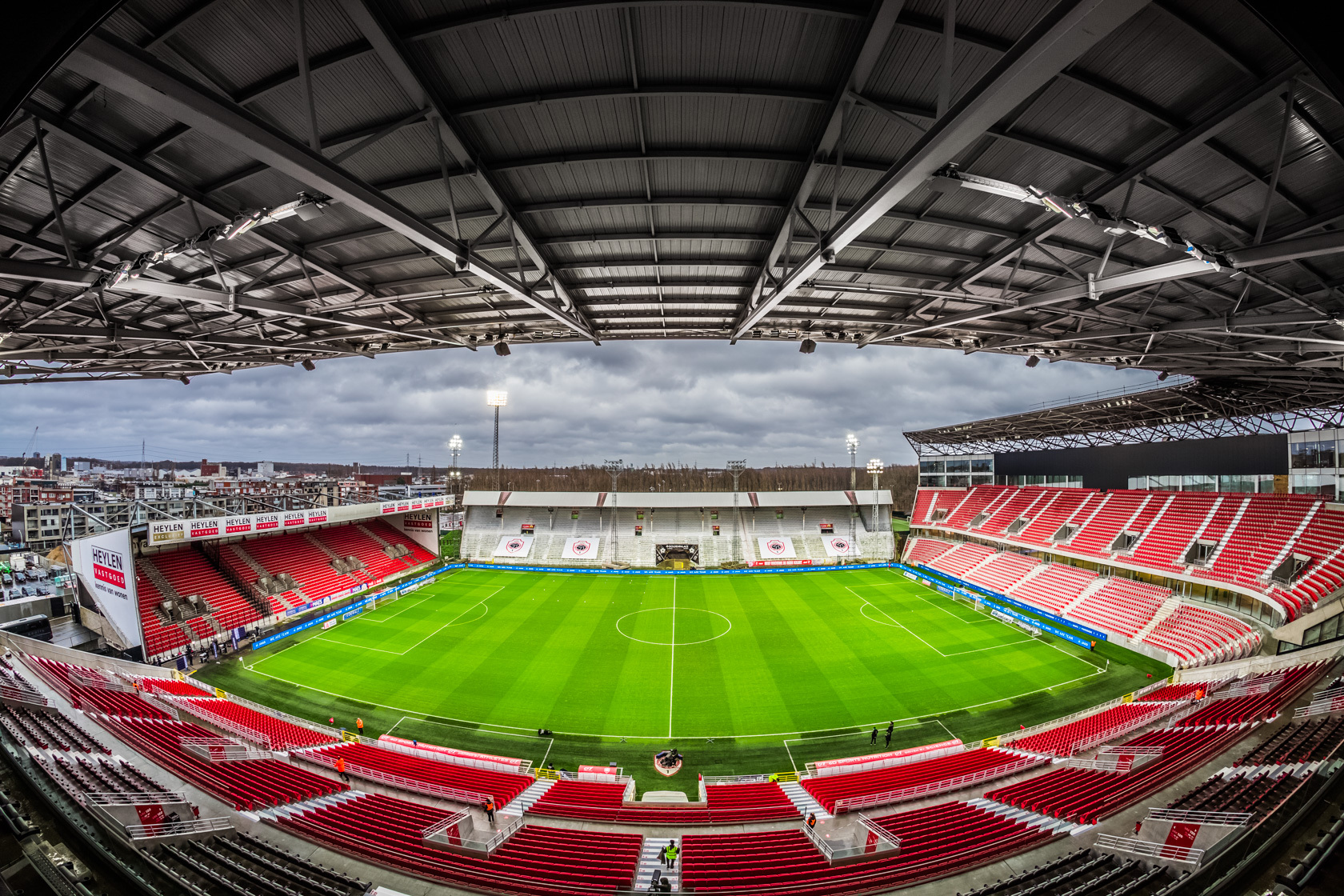
- Bosuilstadion in 2021
- Interactive map of Bosuilstadion
- Full name: Bosuilstadion
- Location: Oude Bosuilbaan 54A; 2100 Deurne; Antwerp; Belgium
- Coordinates: 51°13′57″N 4°28′20″E
- Capacity: 21,000
- Surface: Grass

Construction
- Built: 1921–1923
- Opened: 1 November 1923
- Renovated: 2017–2020; 2025–present

Tenant
- Royal Antwerp (1923–present)

The Bosuilstadion is an association football stadium in the city of Antwerp, Belgium. The stadium was opened in 1923 and has been the home of Royal Antwerp ever since. It has a capacity of 21,000, of which 800 are indoor VIP seats. It is located in the district of Deurne.

The Bosuilstadion hosted the 1964 European Cup Winners' Cup Final replay, which sealed the victory of Sporting Clube de Portugal against MTK Budapest FC. It also hosted the UEFA Euro 1972 semifinal between Belgium and West Germany, won by West Germany. Many friendly international games of Belgium were played at the Bosuil, many of which were against the Netherlands. However, the stadium has not hosted an international game since a friendly match of Germany against Brazil in 1988.

A major reconstruction of the stadium started in 2017. In May 2025, Royal Antwerp began the next phase of its Bosuilstadion redevelopment by demolishing the long-disused east stand (Tribune 2), which had been out of service since 2020. A temporary structure—costing approximately €12.5 million—was completed in December 2025. This upgrade increased the stadium's capacity from 16,000 to around 21,000 spectators. The project follows the model of earlier redevelopments, in which the west and south stands were rebuilt from scratch. Looking ahead, the club also intends to reconstruct the north stand as part of its broader stadium expansion plan.
