= 2014–15 Royal Charleroi SC season =

Charleroi
2014–15 season
- Chairman: Fabien Debecq
- Manager: Felice Mazzu
- Ground: Stade du Pays de Charleroi
- Belgian Pro League: 5th

The 2014–15 season was played by Charleroi, a Belgian football club based in Charleroi, Hainaut. The season covers the period from 1 July 2014 to 30 June 2015. Charleroi participated in the Belgian Pro League and Belgian Cup.

== Review ==
=== Pre-season ===
Charleroi played eight pre-season fixtures in preparation for the 2014–15 season, matches against Royal Châtelet, Racing Fosses, Differdange 03, Excelsior Virton, F91 Dudelange, White Star Bruxelles, Metz and Lens were scheduled. Charleroi started the run of games with a 3–4 win against Royal Châtelet at Complexe des Sablières, with their goals coming from Sébastien Dewaest, Cédric Fauré, Neeskens Kebano and a hat-trick from Giuseppe Rossini. The club then eased past Racing Fosses 1–5 at the Stade Winson.

The club followed that with two straight wins, firstly a 0–2 win over Differdange 03 followed by a 1–4 win over Excelsior Virton. After that on 8 July Charleroi lost a thrilling match against F91 Dudelange 4–3 at Stade Jos Nosbaum. They followed that with another defeat, this time suffering a 1–0 loss to manager Felice Mazzu's previous club White Star Bruxelles on 12 July. Charleroi won their penultimate pre-season fixture 1–2 against Ligue 1 side Metz, that thanks to a brace from new signing Lynel Kitambala.

On 14 April 2014, Charleroi opened their summer transfer spending with the signing of Mali international Kalifa Coulibaly from Paris Saint-Germain for an undisclosed fee, the striker penned a two-year contract with the option of two further years. Charleroi then signed winger Clinton Mata from Eupen for an undisclosed fee on 28 May, he also signed a two-year contract with the option of two further years. The club completed their first loan signing on 14 June, it was a familiar face who arrived in versatile former Senegal youth international Christophe Diandy who had a loan spell at the club in the 2012–13 season, he joined on a season-long loan deal from Mons.

As Salvatore Crimi left the club following the expiration of his loan deal from Zulte Waregem, Mohamed Mrabet also left the club but only on a season-long loan deal to Virton on 15 May. Charleroi's first transfer activity since the transfer window officially opened on 1 July was the incoming of French winger Lynel Kitambala, he signed for an undisclosed fee from Ligue 1 club Saint-Étienne.

== Competitions ==
=== Friendlies ===
Date	Time	Opponents	Venue	Result	Score F–A	Scorers	Ref.
21 June 2014	18:00	Royal Châtelet	Away	W	6–3	Dewaest 38', Fauré 41' pen., Rossini 57' pen., 64', 72', Kebano 62'	
27 June 2014	20:00	Racing Fosses	Away	W	5–1	Rossini 31', Coulibaly 33', Thiaré 55', Tainmont 74', Sağlık 90+1'	
28 June 2014	17:00	Differdange 03	Away	W	2–0	– 14', Daf 34'	
5 July 2014	16:00	Virton	Away	W	4–1	Kebano 34', Coulibaly 40', Fauré 60', 87'	
8 July 2014	19:00	F91 Dudelange	Away	L	3–4	Daf 47', Rossini 61', Tainmont 65'	
12 July 2014	17:00	White Star Bruxelles	Away	L	0–1		
19 July 2014	17:00	Metz	Away	W	2–1	Kitambala 11', 27'	
30 July 2014	19:00	Lens	Away				

=== Belgian Pro League ===
==== Regular season ====
Pos	Team	Pld	W	D	L	GF	GA	GD	Pts	Qualification or relegation
4	Standard Liège	30	16	5	9	49	39	+10	53	Qualification for the Championship play-offs
5	Kortrijk	30	16	3	11	54	35	+19	51	Qualification for the Championship play-offs
6	Charleroi	30	14	7	9	44	31	+13	49	Qualification for the Championship play-offs
7	Genk	30	13	10	7	38	28	+10	49	Qualification for the Europa League play-offs
8	Lokeren	30	10	12	8	38	32	+6	42	Qualification for the Europa League play-offs

Source: Belgian Pro League
Rules for classification: 1) points; 2) number of matches won; if teams are still tied a play-off is organised.

Date	Time	League position	Opponents	Venue	Result	Score F–A	Scorers	Attendance	Ref.
25 July 2014	20:30	16th	Standard Liège	Away	L	0–3			
2 August 2014	20:00	15th	Westerlo	Home	L	2–3	Fauré 7', Kitambala 27'	4,523	
10 August 2014	18:00	16th	Anderlecht	Away	L	0–1		21,000	
16 August 2014	20:00	16th	Waasland-Beveren	Home	D	2–2			
23 August 2014	20:00	11th	Lierse	Away	W	2–0			
31 August 2014	20:00	9th	Mechelen	Home	W	2–0			
13 September 2014	20:00	12th	Cercle Brugge	Away	L	0–1			
19 September 2014	20:30	6th	Zulte-Waregem	Home	W	2–1			
27 September 2014	20:30	11th	Genk	Away	D	1–1			
4 October 2014	18:00	13th	Kortrijk	Home	L	0–2			
18 October 2014	20:30	12th	Gent	Away	D	2–2			
25 October 2014	20:00	9th	Oostende	Home	W	2–0			
29 October 2014	20:30	11th	Lokeren	Away	L	2–5			
2 November 2014	18:00	12th	Club Brugge	Home	D	0–0			
8 November 2014	18:00	10th	Mouscron-Péruwelz	Away	W	2–0			
22 November 2014	18:00	7th	Anderlecht	Home	W	3–1			
29 November 2014	18:00	7th	Westerlo	Away	W	3–2			
7 December 2014	18:00	8th	Standard Liège	Home	L	0–1			
13 December 2014	20:00	7th	Waasland-Beveren	Away	W	3–1			
20 December 2014	20:00	5th	Lierse	Home	W	6–0			
26 December 2014	14:30	4th	Zulte-Waregem	Away	W	3–1			
17 January 2015	20:00	5th	Cercle Brugge	Home	L	0–2			
24 January 2015	18:00	6th	Kortrijk	Away	D	0–0			
31 January 2015	18:00	5th	Genk	Home	W	1–0			
7 February 2015	18:00	6th	Mechelen	Away	D	0–0			
15 February 2015	20:00	7th	Gent	Home	D	0–0			
21 February 2015	20:00	6th	Oostende	Away	W	3–1			
28 February 2015	18:00	6th	Lokeren	Home	W	1–0			
7 March 2015	20:00	7th	Club Brugge	Away	L	0–1			
15 March 2015	14:30	6th	Mouscron-Péruwelz	Home	W	2–0			

==== Championship play-offs ====
Pos	Team	Pld	W	D	L	GF	GA	GD	Pts	Qualification
1	Gent (C)	10	6	2	2	18	11	+7	49	Qualification for the Champions League group stage
2	Club Brugge	10	5	1	4	16	16	0	47	Qualification for the Champions League third qualifying round
3	Anderlecht	10	5	2	3	18	13	+5	46	Qualification for the Europa League group stage (Note: Since winners of the 2014–15 Belgian Cup, Club Brugge, qualified for the Champions League based on league position, the spot awarded to the Cup winner (Europa League group stage) was passed to the third-placed team and the other spots were adjusted accordingly.)
4	Standard Liège	10	4	1	5	14	13	+1	40	Qualification for the Europa League third qualifying round
5	Charleroi	10	3	2	5	13	15	−2	36	Qualification for the Testmatches to Europa League (Note: The team finishing in fifth place, Charleroi, will play the testmatches against the winner of the Belgian Europa League playoff final, for a spot in the Europa League second qualifying round.)
6	Kortrijk	10	2	2	6	11	22	−11	34	

Source: soccerway.com
Rules for classification: 1) points; 2) points after deduction of (possible) half points added due to rounding; 3) number of wins; 4) goal difference; 5) number of goals scored; 6) number of away goals scored; 7) number of away wins.
(C) Champions
Notes:

Date	Time	League position	Opponents	Venue	Result	Score F–A	Scorers	Attendance	Ref.
6 April 2015	18:00	6th	Anderlecht	Away	L	0–1			
11 April 2015	20:30	5th	Gent	Home	W	2–1			
19 April 2015	20:30	6th	Kortrijk	Away	D	1–1			
25 April 2015	18:00	4th	Standard Liège	Home	W	1–0			
29 April 2015	20:30	5th	Club Brugge	Away	L	1–3			
3 May 2015	18:00	6th	Anderlecht	Home	L	0–1			
8 May 2015	20:30	4th	Gent	Away	D	1–1			
17 May 2015	20:30	5th	Kortrijk	Home	W	5–2			
21 May 2015	20:30	5th	Club Brugge	Home	L	2–3			
24 May 2015	14:30	5th	Standard Liège	Away	L	0–2			

==== Europa League play-off ====
Date	Time	Opponents	Venue	Result	Score F–A	Scorers	Attendance	Ref.
28 May 2015	20:30	Mechelen	Away	L	1–2	Geraerts 54'	7,200	
31 May 2015	18:00	Mechelen	Home	W	2–0	Marinos 69', Ndongala 89'	10,658	

=== Belgian Cup ===
Round	Date	Time	Opponents	Venue	Result	Score F–A	Scorers	Attendance	Ref.
Sixth round	24 September 2014	20:30	Eupen	Home	W	2–0	Sağlık 49', Tainmont 50'	2,500	
Seventh round	3 December 2014	20:00	Oostende	Home	W	2–0	Kebano 34' pen., Fauré 57'	2,609	
Quarter-final first leg	17 December 2014	20:00	Cercle Brugge	Home	W	2–1	Fauré 26', 29'	3,652	
Quarter-final second leg	21 January 2015	20:30	Cercle Brugge	Away	L	0–2		1,200	

== Appearances and goals ==
No.	Pos.	Name	League		Cup		Other		Total		Discipline	
No.	Pos.	Name	Apps	Goals	Apps	Goals	Apps	Goals	Apps	Goals	Yellow card	Red card
1	GK	(Belgium) Maxime Vandermeulen	0	0	0	0	0	0	0	0	0	0
3	DF	(France) Steeven Willems	0	0	0	0	0	0	0	0	0	0
4	DF	(Belgium) Jonathan Vervoort	0	0	0	0	0	0	0	0	0	0
5	DF	(Belgium) Robin Leemans	0	0	0	0	0	0	0	0	0	0
6	DF	(Belgium) Sébastien Dewaest	0	0	0	0	0	0	0	0	0	0
7	MF	(France) Clément Tainmont	0	0	0	0	0	0	0	0	0	0
8	DF	(Spain) Francisco Martos	0	0	0	0	0	0	0	0	0	0
9	FW	(Belgium) Giuseppe Rossini	0	0	0	0	0	0	0	0	0	0
10	MF	(Senegal) Mohamed Daf	0	0	0	0	0	0	0	0	0	0
13	MF	(Senegal) Christophe Diandy	0	0	0	0	0	0	0	0	0	0
15	GK	(Belgium) Valentin Baume	0	0	0	0	0	0	0	0	0	0
16	FW	(Senegal) Jamal Thiaré	0	0	0	0	0	0	0	0	0	0
17	DF	(Greece) Stergos Marinos	0	0	0	0	0	0	0	0	0	0
18	FW	(France) Cédric Fauré	0	0	0	0	0	0	0	0	0	0
19	MF	(Belgium) Clinton Mata	0	0	0	0	0	0	0	0	0	0
20	MF	(Belgium) Jessy Gálvez López	0	0	0	0	0	0	0	0	0	0
22	MF	(Belgium) Guillaume François	0	0	0	0	0	0	0	0	0	0
25	MF	(France) Damien Marcq	0	0	0	0	0	0	0	0	0	0
26	FW	(Mali) Kalifa Coulibaly	0	0	0	0	0	0	0	0	0	0
28	MF	(Belgium) Enes Sağlık	0	0	0	0	0	0	0	0	0	0
31	FW	(France) Harlem Gnohéré	0	0	0	0	0	0	0	0	0	0
35	GK	(Democratic Republic of the Congo) Parfait Mandanda	0	0	0	0	0	0	0	0	0	0
41	DF	(Republic of the Congo) Francis N'Ganga	0	0	0	0	0	0	0	0	0	0
80	MF	(Belgium) Kenneth Houdret	0	0	0	0	0	0	0	0	0	0
88	MF	(Democratic Republic of the Congo) Dieumerci Ndongala	0	0	0	0	0	0	0	0	0	0
92	MF	(France) Neeskens Kebano	0	0	0	0	0	0	0	0	0	0
99	FW	(France) Lynel Kitambala	0	0	0	0	0	0	0	0	0	0
–	DF	(Belgium) Mohamed Mrabet	0	0	0	0	0	0	0	0	0	0
–	FW	(Central African Republic) Evans Kondogbia	0	0	0	0	0	0	0	0	0	0

== Transfers ==
=== Transfers in ===
Position	Player	Transferred from	Fee	Date	Ref.
FW	(Mali) Kalifa Coulibaly	(France) Paris Saint-Germain	Undisclosed	14 April 2014	
MF	(Belgium) Clinton Mata	(Belgium) Eupen	Undisclosed	28 May 2014	
FW	(France) Lynel Kitambala	(France) Saint-Étienne	Undisclosed	7 July 2014	

=== Loans in ===
Position	Player	Loaned from	Date	Loan expires	Ref.
FW	(Senegal) Christophe Diandy	(Belgium) Mons	14 June 2014	End of season	

Total spending: ▼ Undisclosed

=== Transfers out ===
Position	Player	Transferred to	Fee	Date	Ref.

=== Loans out ===
Position	Player	Loaned to	Date	Loan expires	Ref.
DF	(Belgium) Mohamed Mrabet	(Belgium) Virton	15 May 2014	End of season	
