= 2018–19 Belgian Cup =

Tournament details
- Country: Belgium
- Dates: 29 July 2018 – 1 May 2019

Final positions
- Champions: Mechelen
- Runners-up: Gent

The 2018–19 Belgian Cup, called the Croky Cup for sponsorship reasons, was the 64th season of Belgium's annual football cup competition. The competition began on 29 July 2018 and ended with the final in May 2019. The winners of the competition qualify for the 2019–20 UEFA Europa League Group Stage. Standard Liège were the defending champions.

== Competition format ==
The competition consists of ten rounds. Except for the semi-finals, all rounds are single-match elimination rounds. When tied after 90 minutes in the first three rounds, penalties are taken immediately. In rounds four to seven and the quarterfinals, when tied after 90 minutes first an extra time period of 30 minutes are played, then penalties are taken if still necessary. The semi-finals will be played over two legs, where the team winning on aggregate advances. The final will be played as a single match.

Teams enter the competition in different rounds, based upon their 2018–19 league affiliation. Teams from the fifth-level Belgian Third Amateur Division or lower began in round 1. Belgian Second Amateur Division teams entered in round 2, Belgian First Amateur Division teams entered in round 3, Belgian First Division B teams in round 5 and finally the Belgian First Division A teams enter in round 6.

Round	Clubs remaining	Clubs involved	Winners from previous round	New entries this round	Leagues entering at this round
Round 1	312	224	none	224	Belgian Third Amateur Division and Belgian Provincial Leagues
Round 2	200	160	112	48	Belgian Second Amateur Division
Round 3	120	96	80	16	Belgian First Amateur Division
Round 4	72	48	48	none	none
Round 5	48	32	24	8	Belgian First Division B
Round 6	32	32	16	16	Belgian First Division A
Round 7	16	16	16	none	none
Quarter-Finals	8	8	8	none	none
Semi-Finals	4	4	4	none	none
Final	2	2	2	none	none

== Round and draw dates ==
Round	Draw date	Match date
First Round	29 June 2018	28 and 29 July 2018
Second Round	29 June 2018	4 and 5 August 2018
Third Round	29 June 2018	11 and 12 August 2018
Fourth Round	29 June 2018	18 and 19 August 2018
Fifth Round	29 June 2018	24, 25 and 26 August 2018
Sixth Round	27 August 2018	25, 26 and 27 September 2018
Seventh Round	27 August 2018	4 to 6 December 2018
Quarter-finals	27 August 2018	18 to 20 December 2018
Semi-finals	27 August 2018	Leg 1: 22 to 24 January 2019
Semi-finals	27 August 2018	Leg 2: 29 to 31 January 2019
Final	27 August 2018	1 May 2019

== First round ==
This round of matches is scheduled to be played on 28 & 29 July 2018 and includes teams playing in the Belgian Third Amateur Division and Belgian Provincial Leagues. Teams from the Belgian Third Amateur Division were seeded and could not play each other.

Tie	Home team (tier)	Score	Away team (tier)
1	Blankenberge (6)	1–2	RC Lauwe (6)
2	Oostnieuwkerke (6)	2–1	Vlamertinge (6)
3	WS Lauwe (6)	1-1 (6–5 p)	Kortemark (6)
4	Templeuvois	0–3	Zwevezele (5)
5	Wingene (5)	1–0	Wielsbeke (6)
6	Adegem (6)	0–0 (5–4 p)	Lendelede (8)
7	Wevelgem City (7)	9–3	Meulebeke (6)
8	Wervik (5)	1–1 (7–6 p)	Boezinge (6)
9	Deerlijk (6)	5–0	Pittem (9)
10	Ploegsteert-Bizet (7)	0–5	Tournai (5)
11	Havinnes (7)	1–2	Torhout (5)
12	Oostduinkerke (6)	1–3	Jong Zulte (6)
13	Oostkamp (5)	0–0 (4–5 p)	Racing Waregem (6)
14	Dadizele (6)	2–4	Eendracht Aalter (6)
15	Merelbeke (5)	10–0	Sint-Anna Bottelare (8)
16	Lebbeke (5)	3–0	Berlare (7)
17	Mariekerke (6)	1–2	Wolvertem Merchtem (5)
18	Avanti Stekene (5)	0-0 (7–6 p)	Sottegem (6)
19	Svelta Melsele (5)	1–0	Bodegem Kapelle United (7)
20	Appelterre-Eichem (6)	2–3	Zelzate (5)
21	Jong Lede (5)	1–2	Eendracht Elene-Grotenberge (6)
22	Vlaamse Ardennen (6)	2–0	Sint-Martens-Latem (7)
23	Bornem (5)	1–2	Hoger Op Kalken (6)
24	Heusden Sport (8)	1–3	Ninove (6)
25	Mazenzele Opwijk (8)	0–7	Lochristi (6)
26	Munkzwalm (7)	1–2	Kobbegem (8)
27	Dendermonde (6)	4–2	Oudenhove (8)
28	Wetteren (5)	5–1	Drongen (6)
29	Eendracht Zele (6)	1–2	Racing Club Bambrugge (6)
30	Bosquetia Frameries (7)	4–1	Greunsjotters Vossem (8)
31	CS Brainois (8)	6–2	Auderghem (7)
32	Léopold (5)	2–0	Maurage (7)
33	Colfontaine (7)	0–2	Le Roeulx (6)
34	Rapid Symphorinois (5)	1–3	ASC Berchem (8)
35	Stockel (5)	1–1 (3–1 p)	Rhodienne-De Hoek (6)
36	Hoeilaart (6)	3–0	Union Lasne Ohain (6)
37	Paturageois (6)	0–1	Stade Brainois (5)
38	Beloeil (6)	3–3 (2–3 p)	Pays Vert Ostiches-Ath (5)
39	Wavre (5)	2–0	Avenir Lembeek (8)
40	Soignies Sports (6)	1–1 (3–4 p)	Huldenberg (6)
41	Racing Club Waterloo (6)	4–2	ACM Uccle (7)
42	Peruwelz (6)	1–2	Albert Quevy-Mons (5)
43	Kosova Schaerbeek (6)	0–0 (3–5 p)	Pepingen-Halle (6)
44	Houdinois (6)	1–0	Entité Manageoise (6)
45	Chastre (7)	1–4	Villers La Ville (6)
46	Grand-Leez (6)	2–0	Gilly (7)
47	Entente Binchoise (6)	1–2	Wépionnais (6)
48	Flavion Sport (6)	1–10	Union Namur Fosses-La-Ville (5)
49	Monceau (6)	2–0	Ligny (6)
50	Tienen (5)	2–0	Pont-A-Celles Buzet (6)
51	Rhisnois (6)	0–0 (5–3 p)	Gosselies Sport (6)
52	Jeunesse Aischoise (6)	1–1 (5–6 p)	Loyers (6)
53	Bierbeek (6)	1–1 (4–1 p)	Warnant (5)
54	Entité Floreffe (7)	3–2	Nismes (6)
55	Huppaytoise (7)	1–6	Taminoise (5)
56	La Molignée (6)		Anderlues (6)

Tie	Home team (tier)	Score	Away team (tier)
57	Condruzien (5)	0–1	Givry (5)
58	Nothomb-Post (7)	0–4	Longlier A (6)
59	Ethe-Belmont (6)	5–1	Hautes Fagnes (7)
60	Mormont (6)	2–1	Habay-La-Neuve (6)
61	Weywertz (6)	1–0	Meix-Dt-Virton (5)
62	Sartoise (6)	1–0	Oppagne-Wéris (5)
63	Champlonaise (6)	3–0	Erezée (7)
64	Melreux-Hotton (7)	0–1	Saint-Louis-Saint-Léger (6)
65	Büllingen (8)	1–0	Longlier B (7)
66	Marloie Sport (6)	3–1	Honsfelder (7)
67	Rochefortoise Jemelle (6)	2–0	Rossignol (6)
68	Onhaye (6)	3–0	La Roche (6)
69	Chevetogne (7)	2–1	Condruzien II (5)
70	Stockay-Warfusée (6)	7–0	FC de Trooz (6)
71	Soiron (8)		s'Herenelderen (7)
72	Schoonbeek-Beverst (7)	12–0	Etoile Vervietoise (7)
73	Bressoux (8)	1–5	Verlaine (5)
74	Aywaille (5)	4–3	Bregel Sport (7)
75	Banneux-Sprimont A (5)	3–1	Huy (6)
76	Banneux-Sprimont B (6)	1–3	Aubel (6)
77	Huccorgne Sports (8)	0–6	Zepperen-Brustem (6)
78	Heusy Rouheid (8)	1–0	Boorsem Sport (8)
79	Union La Calamine (5)	4–1	Franchimontois (7)
80	United Richelle (5)	1–1 (2–3 p)	UCE de Liège (6)
81	Eendracht Termien (5)	10–0	Harzé (8)
82	As-Niel United (8)	0–1	Bilzerse Waltwilder (5)
83	Pontisse Cité (7)	0–4	Wellen (5)
84	Herstal (5)	1–2	Daring Huvo Jeuk (6)
85	Helson Helchteren (5)	6–0	Lentezon Beerse (8)
86	Hamont 99 (7)	0–3	GS Bree-Beek (6)
87	Hechtel (8)	3–0	Opitter (8)
88	Sint-Dymphna Geel (7)	4–3	Halen (7)
89	Paal-Tervant (7)	0–4	Sint-Lenaarts (5)
90	Witgoor Sport Dessel (6)		Beringen (6)
91	Diest (6)	6–0	Rauw Sport Mol (9)
92	De Kempen (6)	3–0	Berg en Dal (6)
93	Esperanza Pelt (5)	0–0 (5–6 p)	Lille (6)
94	Wezel Sport (7)		Zwaluwen Olmen (7)
95	Gestel (8)	1–2	Herentals (6)
96	Herk-De-Stad (6)	0–4	Zwarte Leeuw (6)
97	Leopoldsburg (6)	0–1	Herkol Neerpelt (6)
98	Ekeren (7)	0–3	Melsbroek (6)
99	Schriek (6)	0–0 (4–2 p)	Retie (7)
100	Kontich (6)	2–1	Putte (8)
101	Tildonk (8)	0–5	Sporting Kampenhout (5)
102	KRC Mechelen (5)	3–0	Excelsior Bouwel (8)
103	Nijlen (5)	3–1	Rapid Leest (7)
104	Woluwe-Zaventem (5)	3–1	Berlaar-Heikant (6)
105	Sterrebeek (6)	0–4	Ternesse Wommelgem (5)
106	Stade Everois (6)	2–5	Lyra-Lierse (5)
107	Houtvenne (5)	10–0	VK Sint-Agatha-Berchem (7)
108	Hoger Op Veltem (6)	0–2	BX Brussels (6)
109	Tremelo (8)	0–5	Ganshoren (6)
110	FSI Berchem (7)	0–1	Aarschot (6)
111	s'Gravenwezel-Schilde (7)	2–0	Jette (5)
112	Grimbergen (6)	0–4	Betekom (5)

== Second round ==
Tie	Home team (tier)	Score	Away team (tier)
113	Eendracht Aalter (6)	2–0	Racing Club Waterloo (6)
114	Ethe-Belmont (6)	0–1	Entente Acren Lessines (4)
115	Marloie Sport (6)	1–1 (3–5 p)	Pepingen-Halle (6)
116	Union La Calamine (5)	0–2	BX Brussels (6)
117	KRC Mechelen (5)	3–0	Herkol Neerpelt (6)
118	Lille (6)	3–4	Hades Hasselt (4)
119	Bilzerse Waltwilder (5)	4–0	Grand-Leez (6)
120	Daring Huvo Jeuk (6)	1–4	Zwarte Leeuw (6)
121	Sint-Eloois-Winkel Sport (4)	8–0	Sartoise (6)
122	Visé (4)	0–5	Wevelgem City (7)
123	Union Namur Fosses-La-Ville (5)	5–1	Zwaluwen Olmen (7)
124	Couvin-Mariembourg (4)	4–0	Bosquetia Frameries (7)
125	Wavre (5)	2–0	Melsbroek (6)
126	Weywertz (6)	0–3	Pays Vert Ostiches-Ath (5)
127	Solières Sport (4)	5–0	Rhisnois (6)
128	Sint-Niklaas (4)	6–0	Chevetogne (7)
129	Olympia Wijgmaal (4)	3–2	Lyra-Lierse (5)
130	Kobbegem (8)	1–1 (3–4 p)	Jong Zulte (6)
131	Albert Quevy-Mons (5)	3–1	Verlaine (5)
132	Adegem (6)	1–4	Lochristi (6)
133	Sporting Hasselt (4)	1–1 (4–5 p)	Hoeilaart (6)
134	Heusy Rouheid (8)	1–4	Woluwe-Zaventem (5)
135	Wallonne Ciney (4)	2–3	Stockay-Warfusée (6)
136	Rebecquoise (4)	3–2	Tournai (5)
137	Cappellen (4)	2–0	Banneux-Sprimont A (5)
138	Givry (5)	2–0	Avanti Stekene (5)
139	Lebbeke (5)	1–1 (8–9 p)	Diegem Sport (4)
140	Menen (4)	4–0	Dendermonde (6)
141	Aywaille (5)	2–3	Merelbeke (5)
142	Monceau (6)	1–1 (4–2 p)	La Louvière (4)
143	Le Roeulx (6)	0–1	Stade Waremmien (4)
144	Aubel (6)	1–0	Schoonbeek-Beverst (7)
145	Wolvertem Merchtem (5)	3–0	ASC Berchem (8)
146	Büllingen (8)	1–1 (2–4 p)	Zepperen-Brustem (6)
147	Championaise (6)	0–2	Witgoor Sport Dessel (6)
148	Duffel (4)	3–0	Anderlues (6)
149	Wetteren (5)	2–2 (9–10 p)	La Louvière-Centre (4)
150	Entité Floreffe (7)	0–1	Temse (4)
151	Tilleur (4)	4–3	Loyers (6)
152	Stockel (5)	1–1 (11–10 p)	Wallonia Walhain (4)

Tie	Home team (tier)	Score	Away team (tier)
153	s'Gravenwezel-Schilde (7)	1–3	Dikkelvenne (4)
154	City Pirates Antwerp (4)	1–1 (4–2 p)	Huldenberg (6)
155	Houtvenne (5)	2–0	Aarschot (6)
156	UCE de Liège (6)	2–0	Sint-Dymphna Geel (7)
157	Spouwen-Mopertingen (4)	0–0 (5–4 p)	Torhout (5)
158	Heur-Tongeren (4)	2–0	Sporting Kampenhout (5)
159	Wingene (5)	2–0	Taminoise (5)
160	Ganshoren (6)	5–1	Bocholt (4)
161	Westhoek (4)	1–1 (4–3 p)	Zwevezele (5)
162	Vosselaar (4)	6–0	Racing Waregem (6)
163	GS Bree-Beek (6)	2–3	RC Gent (4)
164	Tempo Overijse (4)	6–1	Hechtel (8)
165	s'Herenelderen (7)	1–3	Eendracht Elene-Grotenberge (6)
166	Longlier A (6)	1–5	Léopold (5)
167	Betekom (5)	3–2	Houdinois (6)
168	Ninove (6)	0–2	Olsa Brakel (4)
169	Hoogstraten (4)	2–0	Bierbeek (6)
170	Francs Borains (4)	2–1	CS Brainois (8)
171	Wervik (5)	2–1	Wépionnais (6)
172	Herentals (6)	0–1	Meux (4)
173	Hoger Op Kalken (6)	2–4	De Kempen (6)
174	Hamme (4)	5–0	Mormont (6)
175	Londerzeel (4)	1–2	Eendracht Termien (5)
176	Nijlen (5)	1–0	RC Lauwe (6)
177	Wellen (5)	4–4 (4–2 p)	Diest (6)
178	Durbuy (4)	1–1 (4–5 p)	Racing Club Bambrugge (6)
179	Rochefortoise Jemelle (6)	3–7	Ronse (4)
180	Schriek (6)	1–2	Olympic Charleroi (4)
181	Helson Helchteren (5)	0–1	Ternesse Wommelgem (5)
182	Saint-Louis-Saint-Léger (6)	4–4 (4–3 p)	Zelzate (5)
183	Stade Brainois (5)	0–0 (4–2 p)	Onhaye (6)
184	Hamoir (4)	4–1	Deerlijk (6)
185	Eppegem (4)	1–1 (6–4 p)	Vlaamse Ardennen (6)
186	Tienen (5)	1–2	Mandel United (4)
187	Gullegem (4)	1–0	Svelta Melsele (5)
188	Sint-Lenaarts (5)	0–2	Sparta Petegem (4)
189	Villers la Ville (6)	0–0 (3–0 p)	Turnhout (4)
190	Harelbeke (4)	2–0	Oostnieuwkerke (6)
191	WS Lauwe (6)	1–4	Berchem Sport (4)
192	Patro Eisden Maasmechelen (4)	3–0	Kontich (6)

== Third round ==
Tie	Home team (tier)	Score	Away team (tier)
193	Deinze (3)	6–0	BX Brussels (6)
194	Mandel United (4)	1–1 (7–6 p)	Sparta Petegem (4)
195	Dikkelvenne (4)	1–1 (3–4 p)	Sint-Niklaas (4)
196	Stade Waremmien (4)	1–1 (3–4 p)	Harelbeke (4)
197	Rebecquoise (4)	1–1 (6–7 p)	City Pirates Antwerp (4)
198	Entente Acren Lessines (4)	3–0	Stockay-Warfusée (6)
199	Zepperen-Brustem (6)	1–0	Jong Zulte (6)
200	Hoogstraten (4)	2–0	Wevelgem City (7)
201	RC Gent (4)	2–0	UCE de Liège (6)
202	Hoeilaart (6)	0–1	Olympic Charleroi (4)
203	Cappellen (4)	2–1	Bilzerse Waltwilder (5)
204	Spouwen-Mopertingen (4)	2–0	Ganshoren (6)
205	Wavre (5)	0–7	Virton (3)
206	Givry (5)	3–0	Wingene (5)
207	RFC Seraing (3)	3–3 (1–3 p)	Sint-Eloois-Winkel Sport (4)
208	Menen (4)	4–1	Wervik (5)
209	RFC Liège (3)	5–0	Stockel (5)
210	Eendracht Elene-Grotenberge (6)	3–3 (6–7 p)	Duffel (4)
211	Eendracht Termien (5)	3–1	Betekom (5)
212	Ronse (4)	1–1 (4–2 p)	Berchem Sport (4)
213	Albert Quevy-Mons (5)	3–1	Vosselaar (4)
214	Westhoek (4)	2–1	Monceau (6)
215	Chatelet-Farciennes (3)	2–1	Lochristi (6)
216	Dessel Sport (3)	4–0	Diegem Sport (4)

Tie	Home team (tier)	Score	Away team (tier)
217	Pays Vert Ostriches-Ath (5)	0–2	Solières Sport (4)
218	Patro Eisden Maasmechelen (4)	0–0 (5–4 p)	Thes Sport Tessenderlo (3)
219	Zwarte Leeuw (6)	1–2	Heist (3)
220	Saint-Louis-Saint-Léger (6)	1–5	Olsa Brakel (4)
221	De Kempen (6)	4–1	Witgoor Sport Dessel (6)
222	Racing Club Bambrugge (6)	2–3	La Louvière-Centre (4)
223	RWDM47 (3)	5–2	Pepingen-Halle (6)
224	Couvin-Mariemburg (4)	0–1	Stade Brainois (5)
225	Oudenaarde (3)	2–2 (5–4 p)	Léopold (5)
226	Hamme (4)	1–0	Dender EH (3)
227	Merelbeke (5)	2–1	Union Namur Fosses-La-Ville (5)
228	Eendracht Aalst (3)	1–0	Hades Hasselt (4)
229	Wellen (5)	5–1	Eendracht Aalter (6)
230	Aubel (6)	3–2	Woluwe-Zaventem (5)
231	Rupel Boom (3)	5–2	Ternesse Wommelgem (5)
232	Nijlen (5)	3–0	KRC Mechelen (5)
233	Temse (4)	4–2	Wolvertem Merchtem (5)
234	Gullegem (4)	1–1 (6–5 p)	Heur-Tongeren (4)
235	Knokke (3)	3–1	Eppegem (4)
236	Oosterzonen Oosterwijk (3)	1–1 (5–4 p)	Francs Borains (4)
237	ASV Geel (3)	2–2 (4–3 p)	Tilleur (4)
238	Houtvenne (5)	3–1	Villers la Ville (6)
239	Meux (4)	5–1	Tempo Overijse (4)
240	Olympia Wijgmaal (4)	0–3	Hamoir (4)

== Fourth round ==
Tie	Home team (tier)	Score	Away team (tier)
241	Dessel Sport (3)	2–1	Solières Sport (4)
242	Westhoek (4)	2–1	Oudenaarde (3)
243	Harelbeke (4)	2–1	Hamme (4)
244	Oosterzonen Oosterwijk (3)	3–0	Eendracht Termien (5)
245	Knokke (3)	3–2 (n.v.)	Spouwen-Mopertingen (4)
246	Albert Quévy-Mons (5)	2–1	Aubel (6)
247	Hoogstraten (4)	4–2	La Louvière-Centre (4)
248	Olsa Brakel (4)	1–0	Gullegem (4)
249	Rupel Boom (3)	0–2	Sint-Niklaas (4)
250	Sint-Eloois-Winkel Sport (4)	1–5	Entente Acren Lessines (4)
251	Cappellen (4)	3–3 (1–3 p)	Temse (4)
252	Hamoir (4)	1–2	Eendracht Aalst (3)

Tie	Home team (tier)	Score	Away team (tier)
253	Houtvenne (5)	0–1	Olympic Charleroi (4)
254	Duffel (4)	3–1	De Kempen (6)
255	Chatelet-Farciennes (3)	0–1	Menen (4)
256	Nijlen (5)	0–1	ASV Geel (3)
257	Heist (3)	0–0 (4–2 p)	Patro Eisden Maasmechelen (4)
258	Stade Brainois (5)	1–0	RC Gent (4)
259	Givry (5)	1–0	Merelbeke (5)
260	Virton (3)	5–3	Meux (4)
261	RWDM47 (3)	2–0	Ronse (4)
262	Deinze (3)	4–0	RFC Liège (3)
263	Wellen (5)	0–1	Mandel United (4)
264	City Pirates Antwerp (4)	2–0	Zepperen-Brustem (6)

== Fifth Round ==
Some fifth round ties were reversed as amateur teams (tiers 3 and below) automatically received home advantage in case they met the stadium requirements regarding seating, lighting and safety. Amateur teams are allowed to sell their home advantage.

25 August 2018 Match 265	Lierse Kempenzonen (3)	2–3	Lommel (2)	Lier
20:00 CEST	Meeus 31'; Buyens 66'	Report	Rocha 46', 81'; Valcke 83'	Stadium: Herman Vanderpoortenstadion

26 August 2018 Match 266	Westhoek (4)	0–4	Virton (3)	Ypres
16:00 GMT		Report	Lazaar 13'; Lecomte 23'; Koré 44', 53'	Stadium: Crackstadion; Attendance: 200

26 August 2018 Match 267	Givry (5)	4–4 (a.e.t.) (3–5 p)	Knokke (3)	Givry
16:00 GMT	Baillet; Schinckus (pen.); Sylla; Freid		Vanfleteren; Vandewalle; Van Eyk

26 August 2018 Match 268	Duffel (4)	3–0	Westerlo (2)	Duffel
16:00 GMT	Vertonghen 26'; Van den Buys 43', 74'			Stadium: Sportcentrum@Duffel

25 August 2018 Match 269	Sint-Niklaas (4)	0–1 (a.e.t.)	Harelbeke (4)	Nieuwkerken-Waas
20:00 GMT

25 August 2018 Match 270	Union SG (2)	3–0	City Pirates Antwerp (4)	Forest, Brussels
20:00 GMT	Gérard 5'; Vercauteren 54'; Tau 80'			Stadium: Stade Joseph Marien

27 August 2018 Match 271	KV Mechelen (2)	2–0	Albert Quévy-Mons (5)	Mechelen
20:30 GMT	Tainmont 65', 82'			Stadium: Achter de Kazerne

26 August 2018 Match 272	Olsa Brakel (4)	2–3 (a.e.t.)	Eendracht Aalst (3)	Brakel
16:00 GMT	Lkoutbi 69', 89'		Heymans 48'; De Rock 90'; Bounou 116'

26 August 2018 Match 273	Heist (3)	3–0	Menen (4)	Heist-op-den-Berg
16:00 GMT	Webers (pen.); Orye

25 August 2018 Match 274	Tubize (2)	7–0	Stade Brainois (5)	Tubize
20:00 GMT	Diawara; Henrique; Rosenthal; Naah; Traore			Stadium: Stade Leburton

26 August 2018 Match 275	Olympic Charleroi (4)	2–1	Roeselare (2)	Charleroi
16:00 GMT	Gorry 43'; Luvuezo 61'		Van der Weg 4'	Stadium: Stade de la Neuville

25 August 2018 Match 276	Hoogstraten (4)	4–0	Entente Acren Lessines (4)	Hoogstraten
	Van Huffel 43'; Maes 52', 75'; Meeuwis 58'

Match 277	ASV Geel (3)	0–2	Beerschot Wilrijk (2)	Geel
			Vanzeir 28' (pen.); Okotie 66'	Stadium: De Leunen

25 August 2018 Match 278	Deinze (3)	6–0	RWDM47 (3)	Deinze
	Mertens 4', 42'; Brulmans 23', 46'; Tarfi 62'; Lallemand 78'	Report		Stadium: Burgemeester Van de Wiele Stadion

26 August 2018 Match 279	Mandel United (4)	1–1 (a.e.t.) (6–5 p)	Temse (4)
	Debouver 84'		Van Kerckhoven 59'

25 August 2018 Match 280	Dessel Sport (3)	3–1	OH Leuven (2)	Dessel
20:00 GMT	Lenaerts 5'; Breugelmans 23'; Vosters 84'	Report	Aguemon 69'	Stadium: Armand Melisstadion

1. Order of legs reversed as non-professional team received home advantage.
2. Order of legs reversed as stadium of non-professional team did not meet requirements or the home advantage was sold.

== Sixth Round ==
The draw for the sixth round was made on 28 August 2018 and included the 16 teams from the Belgian First Division A, which were all seeded and could not meet each other. All non-professional teams (division 3 and below) automatically received home advantage if their stadium had sufficient capacity and floodlight luminosity, which was the case for all teams except Duffel and Mandel United.

25 September 2018	Eupen (1)	3–0	Tubize (2)	Eupen
20:00 CEST	Lotiès 11'; Yagan 37'; Laurent 90'	Report		Stadium: Kehrwegstadion

25 September 2018	Waasland-Beveren (1)	1–2	Mandel United (4)	Beveren
20:00 CEST	Salquist 69'		de Oliveira 15'; Beyens 39'	Stadium: Freethiel Stadion

25 September 2018	Harelbeke (4)	0–1	Kortrijk (1)	Harelbeke
20:30 CEST		Report	Chevalier 78'	Stadium: Forestiersstadion

26 September 2018	Genk (1)	4–0	Lommel (2)	Genk
20:00 CEST	Wouters 2'; Zhegrova 8'; Seck 71'; Ingvartsen 88'	Report		Stadium: Luminus Arena

26 September 2018	Olympic Charleroi (4)	2–5	Lokeren (1)	Charleroi
20:00 CEST	Somé 44'; Virgone 63'	Report	Skúlason 4', 79' (pen.); Filipović 24'; Cevallos 28' (pen.); Saroka 49'	Stadium: Stade de la Neuville

26 September 2018	Virton (3)	2–4	Gent (1)	Virton
20:00 CEST	François 28'; Joachim 63'	Report	Awoniyi 3', 89'; Limbombe 78', 90+4'	Stadium: Stade Yvan Georges

26 September 2018	Cercle Brugge (1)	1–2	Beerschot Wilrijk (2)	Bruges
20:00 CEST	Gakpé 11'	Report	Noubissi 26'; Hoffer 87'	Stadium: Jan Breydel Stadium

26 September 2018	Heist (3)	1–2	Zulte Waregem (1)	Heist-op-den-Berg
20:30 CEST	Ventose 63'	Report	De Pauw 18'; Harbaoui 39' (pen.)

26 September 2018	Sint-Truiden (1)	3–0	Duffel (4)	Sint-Truiden
20:30 CEST	De Bruyn 27'; Bezus 36' (pen.); Nazon 47'	Report		Stadium: Stayen

26 September 2018	Dessel Sport (3)	0–3	Excel Mouscron (1)	Dessel
20:30 CEST		Report	Pierrot 51'; Benson 65', 90+3'	Stadium: Armand Melisstadion

26 September 2018	Hoogstraten (4)	1–3	Oostende (1)	Hoogstraten
20:30 CEST	Bokila 52'	Report	Guri 9'; Faes 61'; Milović 63'

26 September 2018	Eendracht Aalst (3)	0–2	Charleroi (1)	Aalst
20:30 CEST		Report	Osimhen 90+2'; Benavente 90+5'	Stadium: Pierre Cornelisstadion

26 September 2018	Standard Liège (1)	1–2	Knokke (3)	Liège
20:30 CEST	Sá 58'	Report	Luyindama 47' (o.g.); Dhondt 73'	Stadium: Stade Maurice Dufrasne

26 September 2018	Deinze (3)	2–0	Club Brugge (1)	Deinze
20:30 CEST	Tarfi 33'; De Greef 70'	Report		Stadium: Burgemeester Van de Wiele Stadion

26 September 2018	KV Mechelen (2)	3–1	Antwerp (1)	Mechelen
20:45 CEST	De Witte 29'; Engvall 51'; Van Damme 87'	Report	Mbokani 36'	Stadium: Achter de Kazerne

27 September 2018	Anderlecht (1)	0–3	Union SG (2)	Anderlecht
20:45 CEST		Report	Niakaté 43', 76', 83'	Stadium: Constant Vanden Stock Stadium

== Seventh Round ==
The draw for the seventh round was made immediately after the last game of the sixth round, between Anderlecht and Union SG, was finished. Six teams outside the top division qualified for this round, with Mandel United from the Belgian Second Amateur Division the lowest still in the competition.

The matches will be played on 4, 5 and 6 December 2018.

4 December 2018	Kortrijk (1)	1–0	Zulte Waregem (1)	Kortrijk
20:30 CET	Batsula 40'	Report		Stadium: Guldensporen Stadion; Referee: Nathan Verboomen

4 December 2018	Gent (1)	3–0	Beerschot Wilrijk (2)	Ghent
20:45 CET	Yaremchuk 19'; Rosted 43'; Chakvetadze 90'	Report		Stadium: Ghelamco Arena; Referee: Jan Boterberg

5 December 2018	Excel Mouscron (1)	3–3 (a.e.t.) (4–5 p)	Oostende (1)	Mouscron
20:00 CET	Boya 14'; Diedhiou (red card) 47'; Mbombo 82'; Leye 116'	Report	Boonen 45+2'; Guri 80'; Zivkovic 102'	Stadium: Stade Le Canonnier
	Penalties
	Leye (penalty scored); Mbombo (penalty scored); Vojvoda (penalty scored); Benson (penalty missed); Boya (penalty scored); Chibani (penalty missed)		(penalty scored) Canesin; (penalty scored) Coopman; (penalty scored) Milović; (penalty missed) Guri; (penalty scored) Zivkovic; (penalty scored) Marquet

5 December 2018	Mechelen (2)	2–0	Lokeren (1)	Mechelen
20:30 CET	Engvall 80'; De Camargo 82'	Report		Stadium: AFAS-stadion Achter de Kazerne

5 December 2018	Deinze (3)	1–3	Eupen (1)	Deinze
20:30 CET	Mertens 19'	Report	Bushiri 8'; Mulumba 13'; Boone 47' (o.g.)	Stadium: Burgemeester Van de Wiele Stadion

5 December 2018	Sint-Truiden (1)	3–2	Mandel United (4)	Sint-Truiden
20:30 CET	De Norre 60'; Boli 82'; Kamada 84'	Report	Rodrigo 79' (pen.); Pyck 90'	Stadium: Stayen

5 December 2018	Charleroi (1)	1–3	Genk (1)	Charleroi
20:45 CET	Gholizadeh 35'	Report	Dewaest 54'; Mæhle 76'; Gano 90+3'	Stadium: Stade du Pays de Charleroi

6 December 2018	Union SG (2)	3–2	Knokke (3)	Forest
20:45 CET	Ferber 12'; Tau 58', 68'; Mehlem (yellow card) 33' (yellow-red card) 70'	Report	Vandewalle 40'; Andries 86'	Stadium: Stade Joseph Marien

== Quarter-finals ==
The draw for the quarter-finals was made on 5 December 2018, with the matches were played on 18 and 19 December 2018. Both Mechelen and Union SG, the two remaining teams from outside the top division managed to qualify for the Semi-finals.

18 December 2018	Sint-Truiden (1)	1–3	Gent (1)	Sint-Truiden
20:45 CET	Boli 90+1'	Report	Dompé 37', 61'; Yaremchuk 59'	Stadium: Stayen; Attendance: 3,000; Referee: Bram Van Driessche

19 December 2018	Mechelen (2)	3–0	Kortrijk (1)	Mechelen
20:00 CET	Cocalić 22'; Storm 33'; De Camargo 73'	Report	Mboyo (yellow card) 45' (yellow-red card) 53'; Charisis (yellow card) 39' (yellow-red card) 89'	Stadium: AFAS-stadion Achter de Kazerne; Attendance: 10,520; Referee: Jonathan Lardot

19 December 2018	Eupen (1)	0–1	Oostende (1)	Eupen
20:00 CET		Report	Zivkovic 74'; Milović (yellow card) 68' (yellow-red card) 77'	Stadium: Kehrwegstadion; Attendance: 1,800; Referee: Bert Put

19 December 2018	Union SG (2)	2–2 (a.e.t.) (4–3 p)	Genk (1)	Forest
20:45 CET	Tau 18'; Ferber 71'	Report	Gano 48', 76'	Stadium: Stade Joseph Marien; Attendance: 6,217; Referee: Erik Lambrechts
	Penalties
	Pinto-Borges (penalty scored); Ferber (penalty missed); Kis (penalty scored); Tau (penalty scored); Selemani (penalty scored)		(penalty scored) Gano; (penalty missed) Samatta; (penalty scored) Pozuelo; (penalty missed) Berge; (penalty scored) Paintsil

== Semi-finals ==
The draw for the semi-finals was made on 19 December, after completion of the last matches of the quarter-finals. As the two teams remaining from the 2018–19 Belgian First Division B, Mechelen and Union SG, were drawn against each other, at least one team from outside the top division will play the final, which last happened in the 2001 Belgian Cup Final when Belgian Second Division champions Lommel lost to Westerlo.

The matches will be played on 23, 24, 29 and 30 January 2019.

=== First Legs ===
23 January 2019	Mechelen (2)	0–0	Union SG (2)	Mechelen
20:45 CET		Report	Peyre (yellow card) 44' (yellow-red card) 47'	Stadium: AFAS-stadion Achter de Kazerne; Attendance: 14,002; Referee: Bram Van Driessche

24 January 2019	Gent (1)	2–2	Oostende (1)	Ghent
20:45 CET	Yaremchuk 24'; Plastun (red card) 29'; Rosted (red card) 55'; Bronn 77'	Report	De Sutter 26'; Nkaka (yellow card) 57' (yellow-red card) 60'; De Bock 79'	Stadium: Ghelamco Arena; Referee: Christof Dierick

=== Second Legs ===
29 January 2019	Union SG (2)	1–2 (1–2 agg.)	Mechelen (2)	Forest
20:45 CET	Lemoine 90+2' (o.g.)	Report	de Camargo 31'; Tainmont 66'	Stadium: Stade Joseph Marien; Attendance: Nicolas Laforge; Referee: 6,500

30 January 2019	Oostende (1)	2–2 (a.e.t.) (4–4 agg.) (3–4 p)	Gent (1)	Ostend
20:45 CET	De Sutter 9'; Sakala 32'	Report	Sørloth 85'; Bezus 90+2'	Stadium: Versluys Arena; Referee: Erik Lambrechts
	Penalties
	Sakala (penalty scored); Coopman (penalty missed); Milović (penalty missed); Vanlerberghe (penalty scored); Boonen (penalty scored); Vandendriessche (penalty missed)		(penalty scored) Derijck; (penalty missed) Chakvetadze; (penalty scored) Sørloth; (penalty scored) Bronn; (penalty missed) Jonathan David; (penalty scored) Bezus

== Final ==
The final took place on 1 May 2019 at the King Baudouin Stadium in Brussels.

1 May 2019
14:30

Gent	1–2	KV Mechelen
Dompé 32'	report	Storm 38'; Mera 62'

King Baudouin Stadium, Brussels
Referee: Erik Lambrechts
