= 2013–14 Belgian Pro League =

111th season of top-tier football in Belgium

Jupiler Pro League
- Season: 2013–14
- Champions: Anderlecht
- Relegated: Mons; OH Leuven
- Champions League: Anderlecht; Standard Liège
- Europa League: Lokeren; Club Brugge; Zulte Waregem
- Matches: 299
- Goals: 810 (2.71 per match)
- Top goalscorer: Hamdi Harbaoui (22 goals)
- Biggest home win: Anderlecht 5–0 Mechelen
- Biggest away win: Cercle Brugge 0–5 Standard Liège; Lierse 0–5 Standard Liège
- Highest scoring: Zulte Waregem 4–3 Anderlecht; Anderlecht 5–2 Charleroi; Genk 5–2 Zulte Waregem; Kortrijk 3–4 Lierse; OH Leuven 2–5 Club Brugge
- Longest winning run: 9 matches Standard Liège
- Longest unbeaten run: 16 matches Standard Liège
- Longest winless run: 16 matches Mons
- Longest losing run: 6 matches Genk

The 2013–14 season of the Belgian Pro League (also known as Jupiler Pro League for sponsorship reasons) was the 111th season of top-tier football in Belgium. It started on 27 July 2013 with the match between Club Brugge and Charleroi and finished on 18 May 2014 with Anderlecht grabbing their 33rd title due to a 3–1 at home against Lokeren.

During the regular season, Standard Liège started by winning their first nine matches, putting pressure on their main challengers Anderlecht, Club Brugge, Genk and Zulte Waregem. At the halfway point, Genk was closing in on Standard, trailing by one point, but following a series of losses they dropped several places in the standings and eventually they narrowly held on to sixth place and just made it into the title playoffs. Towards the end of the regular season, mainly Club Brugge proved to be a threat as they had narrowed the gap to Standard, closing in to only four points.

The playoffs started with Standard leading on 34 points and Club Brugge right behind them on 32. Both Anderlecht (29 points) and Zulte Waregem (27 points) were at that point considered long shots for the title, while Lokeren on 26 and Genk on 23 were considered to be out of contention. Early in the playoffs, Standard immediately beat Anderlecht and knocked them down to eight points behind, seemingly setting up a final title race between them and Club Brugge. Although Standard had been in the lead since the start of the season, they somehow starting struggling, allowing Club Brugge to overtake them in the standings and become the main title favorite with just four games to go. On 4 May 2014, Club Brugge had the chance to permanently knock Anderlecht out of the race, but somehow lost at home against 10 men, putting Standard back into the lead with Anderlecht now a close second. Standard in turn then lost against Club Brugge, putting Anderlecht into the lead with two games to go, a lead which they kept until the end, winning their 33rd title in a season in which they lost no less than 11 games.

The Europa League playoff groups were won by Oostende and Kortrijk, with Oostende overcoming Kortrijk on penalty kicks although they knew they had not been given a licence for European football. As a result, the fourth placed team in the league, Zulte Waregem, were granted access directly.

In the bottom end of the table, Mons started miserably after finishing 7th the previous season, scoring only three points out of their first 15 matches. Their better second half of the season did not help in avoiding the last place. They were thereby forced to play the relegation playoff together with Oud-Heverlee Leuven, who had been struggling to set up a series of decent results, mainly driven by their horrendous away form, drawing only three matches away from home the whole season, while losing all the others. Mons were relegated on 12 April after yet another 2–0 away to OH Leuven, while Leuven themselves faced relegation on 18 May as they could no longer win the Belgian Second Division final round. Both OH Leuven and Mons had been playing in the Belgian Pro League for three seasons.

== Teams ==
Following the 2012–13 Belgian Pro League, Beerschot were originally relegated to the 2013–14 Belgian Second Division after losing their relegation playoff series against Cercle Brugge. However, as they went bankrupt, the team folded and would later merge with KFCO Wilrijk playing at the first provincial level (fifth level) of Belgian football to form KFCO Beerschot – Wilrijk. Beerschot is replaced by 2012–13 Belgian Second Division champions Oostende, who returned to the highest level after their relegation during the 2004–05 season.

As Cercle Brugge won the 2013 Belgian Second Division final round against Second Division teams Mouscron-Péruwelz, Westerlo and WS Woluwe, they were saved from relegation, causing Oostende to be the only newcomer in the Belgian Pro League for this season.

=== Stadia and locations ===
Location of the 2013–14 Belgian Pro League teams

Club	Location	Venue	Capacity
R.S.C. Anderlecht	Anderlecht	Constant Vanden Stock Stadium	21,000
Cercle Brugge K.S.V.	Bruges	Jan Breydel Stadium	29,945
R. Charleroi S.C.	Charleroi	Stade du Pays de Charleroi	25,000
Club Brugge KV	Bruges	Jan Breydel Stadium	29,945
K.R.C. Genk	Genk	Cristal Arena	24,900
K.A.A. Gent	Ghent	Ghelamco Arena	20,000
K.V. Kortrijk	Kortrijk	Guldensporen Stadion	9,500
Lierse S.K.	Lier	Herman Vanderpoortenstadion	14,538
K.S.C. Lokeren Oost-Vlaanderen	Lokeren	Daknamstadion	10,000
K.V. Mechelen	Mechelen	Argosstadion Achter de Kazerne	13,123
R.A.E.C. Mons	Mons	Stade Charles Tondreau	12,000
Oud-Heverlee Leuven	Leuven	Den Dreef	9,493
K.V. Oostende	Ostend	Albertpark	8,125
Standard Liège	Liège	Stade Maurice Dufrasne	30,000
Waasland-Beveren	Beveren	Freethiel Stadion	13,290
S.V. Zulte Waregem	Waregem	Regenboogstadion	8,500

=== Managerial changes ===
Team	Outgoing manager	Manner of departure	Date of vacancy	Position	Replaced by	Date of appointment
Lierse	(Belgium) Eric Van Meir	Replaced	End of 2012–13 season	Pre-season	(Netherlands) Stanley Menzo	14 May 2013
Standard Liège	(Romania) Mircea Rednic	Replaced	End of 2012–13 season	Pre-season	(Israel) Guy Luzon	27 May 2013
Charleroi	(Italy) Mario Notaro	Replaced	End of 2012–13 season	Pre-season	(Belgium) Felice Mazzu	1 June 2013
Club Brugge	(Spain) Juan Carlos Garrido	Replaced	19 September	2nd	(Belgium) Michel Preud'homme	19 September
Mons	(Belgium) Enzo Scifo	Sacked	23 September	16th	(North Macedonia) Čedomir Janevski	27 September
Gent	(Spain) Víctor Fernández	Sacked	30 September	8th	(Romania) Mircea Rednic	1 October
Waasland-Beveren	(Belgium) Glen De Boeck	Sacked	29 October	15th	(Belgium) Bob Peeters	5 November
Mechelen	(Netherlands) Harm van Veldhoven	Sacked	30 December	13th	(Belgium) Franky Vercauteren	5 January
OH Leuven	(Belgium) Ronny Van Geneugden	Mutual Consent	21 January	15th	(Belgium) Herman Vermeulen	26 January
Genk	(Netherlands) Mario Been	Sacked	23 February	6th	(Belgium) Emilio Ferrera	24 February
OH Leuven	(Belgium) Herman Vermeulen	Replaced	25 February	15th	(Croatia) Ivan Leko	25 February
Anderlecht	(Netherlands) John van den Brom	Sacked	9 March	3rd	(Kosovo) Besnik Hasi	10 March
Gent	(Romania) Mircea Rednic	Sacked	9 April	EL Playoffs Group A, 4th	(Belgium) Peter Balette	9 April

== Regular season ==
=== League table ===
Pos	Team	Pld	W	D	L	GF	GA	GD	Pts	Qualification
1	Standard Liège	30	20	7	3	59	17	+42	67	Qualification for the Championship play-offs
2	Club Brugge	30	19	6	5	54	28	+26	63	Qualification for the Championship play-offs
3	Anderlecht	30	18	3	9	61	31	+30	57	Qualification for the Championship play-offs
4	Zulte Waregem	30	14	11	5	51	38	+13	53	Qualification for the Championship play-offs
5	Lokeren	30	15	6	9	48	31	+17	51	Qualification for the Championship play-offs
6	Genk	30	14	3	13	42	39	+3	45	Qualification for the Championship play-offs
7	Gent	30	12	8	10	39	37	+2	44	Qualification for the Europa League play-offs
8	Kortrijk	30	10	9	11	42	44	−2	39	Qualification for the Europa League play-offs
9	Oostende	30	9	7	14	28	46	−18	34	Qualification for the Europa League play-offs
10	Charleroi	30	8	10	12	36	41	−5	34	Qualification for the Europa League play-offs
11	Cercle Brugge	30	9	6	15	29	55	−26	33	Qualification for the Europa League play-offs
12	Lierse	30	9	5	16	36	53	−17	32	Qualification for the Europa League play-offs
13	Mechelen	30	8	7	15	34	51	−17	31	Qualification for the Europa League play-offs
14	Waasland-Beveren	30	6	13	11	28	35	−7	31	Qualification for the Europa League play-offs
15	OH Leuven	30	6	9	15	30	47	−17	27	Qualification for the Relegation play-offs
16	Mons	30	6	4	20	29	53	−24	22	Qualification for the Relegation play-offs

Source: Belgian Pro League
Rules for classification: 1) points; 2) number of matches won; if teams are still tied a playoff is organised.

=== Positions by round ===
Note: The classification was made after the weekend (or midweek) of each matchday, so postponed matches were only processed at the time they were played to represent the real evolution in standings.

Team ╲ Round	1	2	3	4	5	6	7	8	9	10	11	12	13	14	15	16	17	18	19	20	21	22	23	24	25	26	27	28	29	30
Standard Liège	2	2	1	1	1	1	1	1	1	1	1	1	1	1	1	1	1	1	1	1	1	1	1	1	1	1	1	1	1	1
Club Brugge	2	3	2	3	3	3	2	2	2	2	2	3	4	3	5	3	2	2	3	2	3	3	3	3	2	2	2	2	2	2
Anderlecht	11	7	5	5	2	5	4	5	4	5	5	5	5	5	4	5	5	3	2	3	2	2	2	2	3	3	3	3	3	3
Zulte Waregem	5	5	4	4	4	2	5	3	3	3	3	4	3	4	3	2	3	4	4	4	4	4	4	4	4	4	4	4	4	4
Lokeren	4	4	3	2	5	4	3	4	6	6	7	7	6	7	6	6	7	6	6	6	5	5	5	5	5	5	5	5	5	5
Genk	1	1	6	8	6	7	6	6	5	4	4	2	2	2	2	4	4	5	5	5	6	6	6	6	6	6	6	6	6	6
Gent	7	6	9	7	7	6	7	7	8	8	8	8	10	11	9	8	8	8	8	8	8	8	8	7	7	7	7	7	7	7
Kortrijk	6	8	7	6	8	8	8	8	7	7	6	6	7	6	7	7	6	7	7	7	7	7	7	8	8	8	8	8	8	8
Oostende	16	14	14	16	15	15	16	15	13	15	15	14	14	14	14	13	13	11	10	10	11	12	12	10	11	10	10	9	9	9
Charleroi	14	11	8	10	13	13	10	9	9	9	9	10	9	10	11	10	10	10	11	11	10	9	10	12	13	13	12	13	13	10
Cercle Brugge	7	12	11	9	9	9	11	13	14	11	13	12	11	8	8	9	9	9	9	9	9	10	9	9	10	11	9	10	10	11
Lierse	12	14	14	14	11	12	12	10	11	10	11	11	12	12	12	11	11	12	12	13	12	13	13	11	9	9	11	11	11	12
Mechelen	14	13	13	13	10	10	13	11	10	13	10	9	8	9	10	12	12	13	13	12	13	11	11	13	12	12	13	12	12	13
Waasland-Beveren	7	9	10	11	14	14	14	14	15	12	14	15	15	15	15	15	15	15	15	15	15	14	15	15	15	14	14	14	14	14
OH Leuven	13	14	14	15	11	11	9	12	12	14	12	13	13	13	13	14	14	14	14	14	14	15	14	14	14	15	15	15	15	15
Mons	7	10	12	12	16	16	15	16	16	16	16	16	16	16	16	16	16	16	16	16	16	16	16	16	16	16	16	16	16	16

Source: soccerassociation.com

=== Results ===
Home \ Away	AND	CER	CHA	BRU	GNK	GNT	KVK	LIE	LOK	KVM	MON	KVO	OHL	STA	WBE	ZWA
Anderlecht		2–1	5–2	2–0	2–0	4–1	0–1	2–0	2–3	5–0	2–0	4–0	3–1	1–1	2–0	1–0
Cercle Brugge	0–4		3–0	2–0	1–0	1–4	3–1	2–4	0–3	3–2	2–1	2–0	1–1	0–5	0–0	1–1
Charleroi	2–1	2–0		2–2	1–1	0–1	1–2	1–1	2–1	2–2	0–2	0–1	2–0	0–1	1–1	3–2
Club Brugge	4–0	2–0	2–0		0–2	1–1	3–1	4–1	1–0	3–0	2–1	2–0	1–0	1–0	1–2	1–1
Genk	0–1	1–0	0–3	1–3		1–2	1–0	4–0	0–2	1–0	3–1	3–0	3–0	0–2	0–2	5–2
Gent	1–2	1–1	2–1	1–3	1–2		0–1	2–1	1–1	2–1	1–0	1–1	2–0	0–1	2–0	0–1
Kortrijk	2–2	4–0	1–1	4–1	2–2	3–0		3–4	3–3	1–2	1–2	2–0	1–0	1–5	2–1	1–1
Lierse	2–0	1–1	2–1	1–1	0–1	1–3	2–0		1–2	3–0	2–1	0–2	0–0	0–5	1–0	1–2
Lokeren	2–1	3–0	3–1	0–3	3–1	2–2	0–0	1–0		4–0	2–1	1–0	2–0	0–1	0–0	2–4
Mechelen	2–1	1–2	0–3	1–2	0–2	0–1	5–2	0–0	1–0		4–2	1–1	4–2	0–2	0–0	2–2
Mons	0–2	1–1	1–2	0–1	2–3	1–0	0–1	1–5	1–0	0–2		3–0	3–2	0–2	1–1	1–1
Oostende	0–3	2–0	1–0	1–2	4–0	0–0	0–0	3–2	0–3	0–3	2–0		1–1	2–4	2–1	1–1
OH Leuven	1–0	3–0	0–0	2–5	1–4	1–1	1–1	2–0	2–1	0–0	2–2	1–2		0–0	4–2	1–0
Standard Liège	1–1	4–0	2–2	0–0	3–1	2–3	2–0	3–0	2–1	2–0	1–0	2–0	1–0		2–2	2–0
Waasland-Beveren	0–3	0–1	0–0	1–2	0–0	1–1	1–1	3–1	0–2	0–0	4–1	2–0	1–0	1–1		2–2
Zulte Waregem	4–3	2–1	1–1	1–1	1–0	3–2	1–0	3–0	1–1	3–1	2–0	2–2	4–2	1–0	2–0	

Source: Soccerway
Legend: Blue = home team win; Yellow = draw; Red = away team win.

== Championship playoff ==
The points obtained during the regular season were halved (and rounded up) before the start of the playoff. As a result, the teams started with the following points before the playoff: Standard 34 points, Club Brugge 32, Anderlecht 29, Zulte Waregem 27, Lokeren 26 and Genk 23. Had any ties occurred at the end of the playoffs, the half point would have been deducted if it was added. However, as all six teams received the half point bonus, this did not make a difference this season.

=== Playoff table ===
Pos	Team	Pld	W	D	L	GF	GA	GD	Pts	Qualification
1	Anderlecht (C)	10	7	1	2	17	6	+11	51	Qualification for the Champions League group stage
2	Standard Liège	10	4	3	3	14	11	+3	49	Qualification for the Champions League third qualifying round
3	Club Brugge	10	5	1	4	16	11	+5	48	Qualification for the Europa League third qualifying round
4	Zulte Waregem	10	4	2	4	16	15	+1	41	Qualification for the Testmatches
5	Lokeren	10	2	2	6	14	25	−11	34	Qualification for the Europa League play-off round
6	Genk	10	2	3	5	10	19	−9	32	

Source: soccerway.com
Rules for classification: 1) points; 2) points after deduction of (possible) half points added due to rounding; 3) number of wins; 4) goal difference; 5) number of goals scored; 6) number of away goals scored; 7) number of away wins.
(C) Champions

=== Positions by round ===
Below the positions per round are shown. As teams did not all start with an equal number of points, the initial pre-playoffs positions are also given.

Team ╲ Round	Initial	1	2	3	4	5	6	7	8	9	10
Anderlecht	3	4	4	3	4	4	3	2	1	1	1
Standard Liège	1	1	1	1	1	1	2	1	3	2	2
Club Brugge	2	2	2	4	2	2	1	3	2	3	3
Zulte Waregem	4	3	3	2	3	3	4	4	4	4	4
Lokeren	5	5	5	5	5	5	5	5	5	5	5
Genk	6	6	6	6	6	6	6	6	6	6	6

=== Results ===
Home \ Away	STA	BRU	AND	ZWA	LOK	GNK
Standard Liège		0–1	1–0	4–1	2–2	1–0
Club Brugge	0–0		0–1	2–0	5–1	2–0
Anderlecht	2–1	3–0		0–0	3–1	4–0
Zulte Waregem	2–0	2–1	1–2		3–1	2–2
Lokeren	1–3	1–3	1–2	3–2		1–1
Genk	2–2	3–2	1–0	0–3	1–2	

Legend: Blue = home team win; Yellow = draw; Red = away team win.

== Europa League play-off ==
Group A contained the teams finishing the regular season in positions 7, 9, 12 and 14. The teams that finished in positions 8, 10, 11 and 13 were placed in Group B. Oostende held Gent to a 1–1 draw on 26 April and was thereby sure of winning Group A. In Group B, the decision was made on the last matchday when Kortrijk beat Charleroi 2–1 at home on 3 May.

=== Group A ===
Pos	Team	Pld	W	D	L	GF	GA	GD	Pts	Qualification	KVO	GNT	LIE	W-B
1	Oostende (A)	6	4	2	0	7	1	+6	14	Qualification for the Playoff Final		1–1	2–0	0–0
2	Gent	6	3	1	2	11	6	+5	10		0–1		4–0	2–1
3	Lierse	6	2	0	4	5	12	−7	6		0–2	1–0		4–2
4	Waasland-Beveren	6	1	1	4	7	11	−4	4		0–1	2–4	2–0	

Legend: Blue = home team win; Yellow = draw; Red = away team win.
(A) Advance to a further round

=== Group B ===
Pos	Team	Pld	W	D	L	GF	GA	GD	Pts	Qualification	KVK	CHA	KVM	CER
1	Kortrijk (A)	6	4	1	1	16	5	+11	13	Qualification for the Playoff Final		2–1	4–1	4–0
2	Charleroi	6	4	1	1	13	5	+8	13		1–1		3–0	2–0
3	Mechelen	6	3	0	3	6	10	−4	9		2–1	0–2		2–0
4	Cercle Brugge	6	0	0	6	2	17	−15	0		0–4	2–4	0–1	

Legend: Blue = home team win; Yellow = draw; Red = away team win.
(A) Advance to a further round

=== Europa League play-off final ===
The winners of both play-off groups competed in a two-legged match to play the fourth-placed team of the championship playoff, called Testmatch. The winners of this Testmatch were granted entry to the second qualifying round of the 2014–15 UEFA Europa League.

9 May 2014
20:30 CEST

Kortrijk	2–2	Oostende
Chevalier 30'; Pavlović 40'		Jonckheere 20'; Siani 47' (pen.)

Guldensporen Stadion, Kortrijk
Referee: Alexandre Boucaut

17 May 2014
20:00 CEST

Oostende	2–2 (a.e.t.)	Kortrijk
Wilmet 72'; Jonckheere 90+2'		De Smet 55' (pen.); Coulibaly 90'
Penalties
Jali (penalty scored); Siani (penalty missed); Jonckheere (penalty scored); Sládek (penalty scored); Ovono (penalty scored); Schmisser (penalty scored); Foket (penalty scored); Martens (penalty scored)	7–6	(penalty scored) De Smet; (penalty scored) Heylen; (penalty missed) De Mets; (penalty scored) Pavlović; (penalty scored) Martin; (penalty scored) Oussalah; (penalty scored) Chevalier; (penalty missed) Tomašević

Albertpark, Ostend
Referee: Serge Gumienny

Oostende won on penalties after drawing 4–4 on aggregate.

=== Testmatches Europa League ===
The Europa League playoff final was to be played over two legs between Oostende and fourth-place finishers Zulte Waregem, with the winner receiving the right to play in the Second qualifying round of the 2014–15 UEFA Europa League. However, as Oostende did not receive a licence for European football, the match was annulled and Zulte Waregem was awarded the spot directly.

== Relegation playoff ==
The teams finishing in the last two positions faced each other in the relegation playoff. The winner of this playoff played the second division playoff with three Belgian Second Division teams, with the winner playing at the highest level the next season. The loser faced relegation. For finishing 15th, Oud-Heverlee Leuven received the home advantage and an initial lead of 3 points over Mons. Mons was relegated on 12 April as OHL had obtained a lead of 9 points with only 2 matches left. However, Oud-Heverlee Leuven then failed to finish top of the Belgian Second Division final round group, ensuring their relegation as well.

Pos	Team	Pld	W	D	L	GF	GA	GD	Pts	Relegation
1	OH Leuven (R)	3	2	1	0	5	1	+4	10	Qualification for the Belgian Second Division final round
2	Mons (R)	3	0	1	2	1	5	−4	1	Relegation to 2014–15 Belgian Second Division

Source: soccerway.com
Rules for classification: 1) points; 2) head-to-head points; 3) head-to-head goal difference; 4) head-to-head goals scored; 5) goal difference; 6) number of goals scored.
(R) Relegated

The matches in the table below were played from left to right:

Home \ Away	MON	OHL	MON	OHL
Mons		1–1		– (Note: Remaining two matches not played as Mons could no longer overtake Oud-Heverlee Leuven in the standings. Mons was down 9 points with only 6 to play for.)
OH Leuven	2–0		2–0	

Source: soccerway.com
Legend: Blue = home team win; Yellow = draw; Red = away team win.

== Season statistics ==
Source: Sporza.be and Sport.be (in Dutch)

Up to and including matches played on 18 May.

=== Top scorers ===
Position	Player	Club	Goals
1	(Tunisia) Hamdi Harbaoui	Lokeren	22
2	(Belgium) Michy Batshuayi	Standard Liège	21
3	(Central African Republic) Habib Habibou	Zulte Waregem	20
4	(Serbia) Aleksandar Mitrović	Anderlecht	16
5	(Croatia) Ivan Santini	Kortrijk	15
6	(Belgium) Thorgan Hazard	Zulte Waregem	14
7	(Belgium) Stijn De Smet	Kortrijk	13
7	(Belgium) David Pollet	Anderlecht (2) & Charleroi (11)	13
9	(Belgium) Tom De Sutter	Club Brugge	12
9	(Nigeria) Imoh Ezekiel	Standard Liège	12
9	(Belgium) Jelle Vossen	Genk	12

11 goals (2 players)

- (Belgium) Maxime Lestienne (Club Brugge)
- (Belgium) Hans Vanaken (Lokeren)

10 goals (3 players)

- (Belgium) Massimo Bruno (Anderlecht)
- (Senegal) Elimane Coulibaly (Kortrijk)
- (Belgium) Bjorn Ruytinx (OH Leuven)
- (Serbia) Dalibor Veselinović (Waasland-Beveren)

9 goals (4 players)

- (France) Julien Gorius (Genk)
- (Morocco) Rachid Bourabia (Lierse)
- (Belgium) Geoffrey Mujangi Bia (Standard Liège)}
- (Guinea) Idrissa Sylla (Zulte Waregem)

8 goals (5 players)

- (United States) Sacha Kljestan (Anderlecht)
- (France) Cédric Fauré (Charleroi)
- (Scotland) Tony Watt (Lierse)
- (Belgium) Tim Matthys (Mons)
- (Belgium) Paul-Jose M'Poku (Standard Liège)

7 goals (6 players)

- (Belgium) Timmy Simons (Club Brugge)
- (Belgium) Hervé Kage (Gent)
- (France) Teddy Chevalier (Kortrijk)
- (Senegal) Mbaye Diagne (Lierse)
- (Belgium) Nill De Pauw (Lokeren)
- (Belgium) Laurent Depoitre (Oostende)

6 goals (10 players)

- (Argentina) Matías Suárez (Anderlecht)
- (Denmark) Jesper Jørgensen (Club Brugge)
- (Poland) Waldemar Sobota (Club Brugge)
- (Belgium) Thomas Buffel (Genk)
- (Belgium) Ilombe Mboyo (Genk (5) & Gent (1))
- (Belgium) David Destorme (Mechelen)
- (Belgium) Seth de Witte (Mechelen)
- (Denmark) Mads Junker (Mechelen)
- (Cameroon) Sébastien Siani (Oostende)
- (Belgium) Jens Naessens (Zulte Waregem)

5 goals (17 players)

- (Democratic Republic of the Congo) Chancel Mbemba (Anderlecht)
- (Belgium) Dennis Praet (Anderlecht)
- (Democratic Republic of the Congo) Junior Kabananga (Cercle Brugge)
- (Nigeria) Michael Uchebo (Cercle Brugge)
- (Belgium) Sébastien Dewaest (Charleroi)
- (France) Neeskens Kebano (Charleroi)
- (Belgium) Björn Engels (Club Brugge)
- (Belgium) Yassine El Ghanassy (Gent)
- (Denmark) Nicklas Pedersen (Gent)
- (Belgium) Thomas Matton (Kortrijk)
- (Brazil) Junior Dutra (Lokeren)
- (Israel) Shlomi Arbeitman (Mons)
- (Belgium) Evariste Ngolok (OH Leuven)
- (Belgium) Jonathan Wilmet (Oostende)
- (Belgium) Igor de Camargo (Standard Liège)
- (North Macedonia) Ivan Tričkovski (Waasland-Beveren)
- (France) Raphaël Cacérès (Zulte Waregem)

4 goals (15 players)

- (Ivory Coast) Cyriac (Anderlecht)
- (Belgium) Guillaume Gillet (Anderlecht)
- (Belgium) Stephen Buyl (Cercle Brugge)
- (France) Clément Tainmont (Charleroi)
- (Iceland) Eiður Guðjohnsen (Club Brugge)
- (Israel) Lior Refaelov (Club Brugge)
- (Ghana) Bennard Kumordzi (Genk)
- (Belgium) Benito Raman (Kortrijk)
- (Argentina) Hernán Losada (Lierse)
- (Belgium) Jordan Remacle (Lokeren)
- (Belgium) Benjamin Mokulu (Mechelen)
- (North Macedonia) Jovan Kostovski (OH Leuven)
- (Belgium) Robin Henkens (Waasland-Beveren)
- (Belgium) Sven Kums (Zulte Waregem)
- (Iceland) Ólafur Ingi Skúlason (Zulte Waregem)

3 goals (24 players)

- (Ghana) Frank Acheampong (Anderlecht)
- (Honduras) Andy Najar (Anderlecht)
- (Belgium) Tim Smolders (Cercle Brugge)
- (Switzerland) Danijel Milićević (Charleroi)
- (Belgium) Thomas Meunier (Club Brugge)
- (Belgium) Vadis Odjidja-Ofoe (Club Brugge)
- (Tunisia) Fabien Camus (Genk)
- (Serbia) Nebojša Pavlović (Kortrijk)
- (France) Jérémy Taravel (Lokeren)
- (Democratic Republic of the Congo) Wilson Kamavuaka (Mechelen)
- (North Macedonia) Aleksandar Trajkovski (Mechelen)
- (Belgium) Arnor Angeli (Mons)
- (Belgium) Mohamed Messoudi (OH Leuven)
- (Sweden) Tom Pettersson (OH Leuven)
- (France) Frédéric Brillant (Oostende)
- (Brazil) Fernando Canesin (Oostende)
- (France) Baptiste Schmisser (Oostende)
- (Morocco) Mehdi Carcela (Standard Liège)
- (Belgium) Laurent Ciman (Standard Liège)
- (Belgium) Jelle Van Damme (Standard Liège)
- (Belgium) Renaud Emond (Waasland-Beveren)
- (Cameroon) Aboubakar Oumarou (Waasland-Beveren)
- (Guinea) Ibrahima Conté (Zulte Waregem)
- (Belgium) Junior Malanda (Zulte Waregem)

2 goals (39 players)

- (Belgium) Olivier Deschacht (Anderlecht)
- (Venezuela) Ronald Vargas (Anderlecht)
- (Belgium) Bart Buysse (Cercle Brugge)
- (Cameroon) Gaël Etock (Cercle Brugge)
- (Belgium) Thibaut Van Acker (Cercle Brugge)
- (Senegal) Mohamed Daf (Charleroi)
- (Belgium) Kenneth Houdret (Charleroi)
- (Chile) Nicolás Castillo (Club Brugge)
- (Spain) Víctor Vázquez (Club Brugge)
- (Ivory Coast) Sekou Cissé (Genk)
- (France) Kalidou Koulibaly (Genk)
- (Belgium) Siebe Schrijvers (Genk)
- (Ghana) Nana Asare (Gent)
- (Uruguay) Carlos Diogo (Gent)
- (Belgium) Christophe Lepoint (Gent)
- (Brazil) Renato Neto (Gent)
- (France) Sloan Privat (Gent)
- (Ivory Coast) Yaya Soumahoro (Gent)
- (Bosnia and Herzegovina) Ervin Zukanović (Gent)
- (Bulgaria) Kostadin Hazurov (Lierse)
- (Belgium) Anthony Limbombe (Lierse)
- (Belgium) Dolly Menga (Lierse)
- (Belgium) Wanderson (Lierse)
- (South Africa) Ayanda Patosi (Lokeren)
- (Senegal) Boubacar Diabang (Mechelen)
- (Belgium) Noë Dussenne (Mons)
- (France) Flavien Le Postollec (Mons)
- (Belgium) Joachim Mununga (Mons)
- (Belgium) Karel Geraerts (OH Leuven)
- (The Gambia) Ibou (OH Leuven)
- (Belgium) Lukas Van Eenoo (OH Leuven (1) & Cercle Brugge (1))
- (Belgium) Yohan Brouckaert (Oostende)
- (Belgium) Michiel Jonckheere (Oostende)
- (France) Xavier Luissint (Oostende)
- (Zimbabwe) Nyasha Mushekwi (Oostende)
- (Belgium) Julien De Sart (Standard Liège)
- (Belgium) Siebe Blondelle (Waasland-Beveren)
- (Slovakia) Róbert Demjan (Waasland-Beveren)
- (Belgium) Karel D'Haene (Zulte Waregem)

1 goal (88 players)

- (Netherlands) Demy de Zeeuw (Anderlecht)
- (Senegal) Cheikhou Kouyaté (Anderlecht)
- (France) Fabrice N'Sakala (Anderlecht)
- (Netherlands) Bram Nuytinck (Anderlecht)
- (Belgium) Youri Tielemans (Anderlecht)
- (Belgium) Frederik Boi (Cercle Brugge)
- (Belgium) Hans Cornelis (Cercle Brugge)
- (Belgium) Kristof D'haene (Cercle Brugge)
- (Belgium) Gregory Mertens (Cercle Brugge)
- (Italy) Gaetano Monachello (Cercle Brugge)
- (Belgium) Arne Naudts (Cercle Brugge)
- (Belgium) Stef Wils (Cercle Brugge)
- (Belgium) Guillaume François (Charleroi)
- (Belgium) Jessy Galvez-Lopez (Charleroi)
- (France) Harlem Gnohéré (Charleroi)
- (Belgium) Onur Kaya (Charleroi)
- (Ghana) Abraham Kumedor (Charleroi)
- (Democratic Republic of the Congo) Dieumerci Ndongala (Charleroi)
- (Belgium) Giuseppe Rossini (Charleroi)
- (Belgium) Enes Sağlık (Charleroi)
- (France) Mourad Satli (Charleroi)
- (Belgium) Jonathan Blondel (Club Brugge)
- (Belgium) Boli Bolingoli-Mbombo (Club Brugge)
- (Nigeria) Kehinde Fatai (Club Brugge)
- (Norway) Tom Høgli (Club Brugge)
- (China) Wang Shangyuan (Club Brugge)
- (Belgium) Benjamin De Ceulaer (Genk)
- (Belgium) Pieter Gerkens (Genk)
- (Trinidad and Tobago) Khaleem Hyland (Genk)
- (France) Steeven Joseph-Monrose (Genk)
- (South Africa) Anele Ngcongca (Genk)
- (Belgium) Derrick Tshimanga (Genk)
- (Belgium) Brecht Dejaegere (Gent)
- (France) Rémi Maréval (Gent)
- (Croatia) Ante Puljić (Gent)
- (Belgium) Brecht Capon (Kortrijk)
- (Luxembourg) Maxime Chanot (Kortrijk)
- (Netherlands) Robert Klaasen (Kortrijk)
- (Belgium) Mustapha Oussalah (Kortrijk)
- (Belgium) Wouter Corstjens (Lierse)
- (Egypt) Ahmed Farag (Lierse)
- (Tunisia) Karim Saidi (Lierse)
- (Belgium) Julien Vercauteren (Lierse)
- (Ghana) Eugene Ansah (Lokeren)
- (Greece) Georgios Galitsios (Lokeren)
- (Switzerland) Mijat Marić (Lokeren)
- (Belgium) Denis Odoi (Lokeren)
- (Belgium) Killian Overmeire (Lokeren)
- (Belgium) Koen Persoons (Lokeren)
- (Denmark) Alexander Scholz (Lokeren)
- (Belgium) Maxime Biset (Mechelen)
- (Trinidad and Tobago) Sheldon Bateau (Mechelen)
- (Belgium) Alessandro Cordaro (Mechelen)
- (Belgium) Steven De Petter (Mechelen)
- (Ghana) Abdul-Yakuni Iddi (Mechelen)
- (Belgium) Mats Rits (Mechelen)
- (Belgium) Joachim Van Damme (Mechelen)
- (Belgium) Jordi Vanlerberghe (Mechelen)
- (Cameroon) Steve Beleck (Mons)
- (Belgium) Thomas Chatelle (Mons)
- (Senegal) Christophe Diandy (Mons)
- (The Gambia) Mustapha Jarju (Mons)
- (France) Grégory Lorenzi (Mons)
- (Belgium) Pieterjan Monteyne (Mons)
- (France) Jérémy Sapina (Mons)
- (Guinea) Richard Soumah (Mons)
- (Belgium) Alessandro Cerigioni (OH Leuven)
- (France) Romain Reynaud (OH Leuven)
- (Brazil) Robson (OH Leuven)
- (Belgium) Niels De Schutter (Oostende)
- (Belgium) Denis Dessaer (Oostende)
- (Belgium) Tom van Imschoot (Oostende)
- (Spain) Fede Vico (Oostende)
- (Gabon) Frédéric Bulot (Standard Liège)
- (Iran) Reza Ghoochannejhad (Standard Liège)
- (Brazil) Kanu (Standard Liège)
- (France) William Vainqueur (Standard Liège)
- (France) Karim Belhocine (Waasland-Beveren)
- (Montenegro) Mijuško Bojović (Waasland-Beveren)
- (Israel) Rami Gershon (Waasland-Beveren)
- (France) Fayçal Lebbihi (Waasland-Beveren)
- (Serbia) Miloš Marić (Waasland-Beveren)
- (Belgium) René Sterckx (Waasland-Beveren)
- (France) Franck Berrier (Zulte Waregem)
- (Belgium) Theo Bongonda (Zulte Waregem)
- (Senegal) Mbaye Leye (Zulte Waregem)
- (Mali) Mamoutou N'Diaye (Zulte Waregem)
- (Germany) Marvin Pourié (Zulte Waregem)

2 Own goals (1 player)

- (Belgium) Gregory Mertens (Cercle Brugge, scored for Gent and Lierse)

1 Own goal (19 players)

- (Democratic Republic of the Congo) Chancel Mbemba (Anderlecht, scored for Standard Liège)
- (Netherlands) Bram Nuytinck (Anderlecht, scored for Zulte Waregem)
- (Belgium) Laurens De Bock (Club Brugge, scored for Lokeren)
- (Denmark) Jesper Jørgensen (Club Brugge, scored for Kortrijk)
- (Belgium) Thomas Meunier (Club Brugge, scored for Anderlecht)
- (Netherlands) Arjan Swinkels (Lierse, scored for Genk)
- (Belgium) Denis Odoi (Lokeren, scored for Anderlecht)
- (Belgium) Koen Persoons (Lokeren, scored for Standard Liège)
- (Denmark) Alexander Scholz (Lokeren, scored for Zulte Waregem)
- (Trinidad and Tobago) Sheldon Bateau (Mechelen, scored for Zulte Waregem)
- (France) Peter Franquart (Mons, scored for Mechelen)
- (Belgium) Nicolas Timmermans (Mons, scored for Mechelen)
- (Belgium) Ludovic Buysens (OH Leuven, scored for Standard Liège)
- (Belgium) Niels De Schutter (Oostende, scored for Gent)
- (Belgium) Jordan Lukaku (Oostende, scored for OH Leuven)
- (Brazil) Kanu (Standard Liège, scored for Anderlecht)
- (Ghana) Daniel Opare (Standard Liège, scored for Lokeren)
- (Montenegro) Mijuško Bojović (Waasland-Beveren, scored for OH Leuven)
- (Belgium) Junior Malanda (Zulte Waregem, scored for Anderlecht)

=== Hat-tricks ===
Player	For	Against	Result	Date
(Belgium) Geoffrey Mujangi Bia	Standard Liège	Lierse	3–0	4 August 2013
(Croatia) Ivan Santini	Kortrijk	Lokeren	3–3	9 August 2013
(Argentina) Matías Suárez	Anderlecht	Charleroi	5–2	25 August 2013
(Belgium) Michy Batshuayi	Standard Liège	Oostende	4–2	15 September 2013
(Belgium) David Destorme	Mechelen	Oostende	3–0	19 October 2013
(Croatia) Ivan Santini	Kortrijk	Club Brugge	4–1	20 October 2013
(Serbia) Dalibor Veselinović	Waasland-Beveren	Mons	4–1	18 January 2014
(Senegal) Mbaye Diagne	Lierse	Mons	5–1	8 February 2014
(Central African Republic) Habib Habibou	Gent	Cercle Brugge	4–1	8 March 2014
(France) Cédric Fauré	Charleroi	Cercle Brugge	4–2	12 April 2014
(Central African Republic) Habib Habibou	Gent	Waasland-Beveren	4–2	19 April 2014
(Senegal) Mbaye Diagne	Lierse	Waasland-Beveren	4–2	26 April 2014
(Central African Republic) Habib Habibou	Gent	Lierse	4–0	3 May 2014

== Attendances ==
No.	Club	Average attendance	Change	Highest
1	Club Brugge	25,378	3,9%	28,500
2	Standard de Liège	24,850	21,7%	27,700
3	Genk	21,323	3,6%	24,250
4	Anderlecht	20,703	0,1%	24,000
5	Gent	17,464	73,1%	19,950
6	Mechelen	9,414	-7,3%	12,000
7	Oud-Heverlee Leuven	8,391	4,8%	9,500
8	Zulte Waregem	8,295	7,9%	10,500
9	Cercle Brugge	7,536	-11,3%	14,500
10	Sporting Lokeren	7,265	17,8%	9,350
11	Kortrijk	7,213	0,1%	9,900
12	Lierse	6,897	5,2%	9,450
13	Charleroi	6,247	-5,1%	11,400
14	Waasland-Beveren	5,228	-11,6%	8,600
15	Oostende	5,045	91,1%	7,400
16	RAEC	3,569	-14,3%	7,050
