= Nathan Durieux =

Belgian footballer

Personal information
- Date of birth: 26 January 1998 (age 28)
- Place of birth: Belgium
- Position: Attacking midfielder

Team information
- Current team: Flénu

Youth career
- –: Mons
- –2017: OH Leuven U19
- 2017–2018: Charleroi U21

Senior career*
Years	Team	Apps	(Gls)
2016–2017	OH Leuven	2	(0)
2018–2019	Châtelet	28	(1)
2019–2020	Olympic Charleroi	14	(1)
2020–2022	Francs Borains	35	(3)
2023–2026	Mons	42	(4)
2026–	Flénu	13	(3)
- * Club domestic league appearances and goals as of 28 September 2026

Nathan Durieux (born 26 January 1998) is a Belgian professional footballer who plays as a midfielder for Flénu.

Durieux made his professional debut OH Leuven in the Challenger Pro League (back then named "First Division B") on 10 December 2016 at 18 years of age, when he was subbed on for Thomas Azevedo with about 8 minutes left to play, in a 1–2 home loss to Roeselare. At that point he was officially still part of the U19 squad of OH Leuven. One month later, Durieux would make his only other appearance for OH Leuven in a 4–0 away loss to Union SG, now coming on for Kenneth Houdret with about 20 minutes left to play. He would leave in the summer of 2017 to sign for Charleroi where he would only play for the U21 squad, before moving on to Châtelet. Durieux spent most of his career thus far in the Francophone highest amateur leagues, mostly playing in the third and fourth tier of Belgian football, promoting twice from the fourth to the third tier, once with Mons in 2024, and then again with Flénu in 2026.
