= Mathéo Vroman =

French footballer (born 2001)

Personal information
- Date of birth: 19 November 2001 (age 24)
- Place of birth: Villeneuve-d'Ascq, France
- Height: 1.80 m (5 ft 11 in)
- Position: Forward

Team information
- Current team: Flénu
- Number: 9

Youth career
- Leers OS
- –2019: Mouscron

Senior career*
Years	Team	Apps	(Gls)
2019–2022	Mouscron	19	(0)
2022–2023	RAAL La Louvière		
2023	→ Mandel United (loan)		
2023–2026	Acren		
2026–	Flénu		
- * Club domestic league appearances and goals as of 20:52, 10 November 2022 (UTC)

Mathéo Vroman (born 19 November 2001) is a French professional footballer who plays as a forward for Belgian Division 1 club Flénu.
