= FC Flénu =

Belgian football club

- Full name: Football Club Flénu
- Founded: 2001; Matricule number 9386
- Ground: Complexe Sportif Flénu; Flénu
- 2025–26: Belgian Division 2 FFA, 4th of 16 (promoted)
- Website: fcflenu.be
Home colours

FC Flénu is a Belgian association football club based in Flénu, Hainaut. The club has matricule number 9386 and the club's colors are red and white. They currently play in the Belgian Division 1, and play their home games at the Complexe Sportif Flénu in Flénu.

== History ==
FC Flénu is a relatively young club, as it was founded only in 2001. While not linked whatsoever, the club sees itself as the successor of dissolved clubs FC Flénu Sport (1944-1990), Entente Flénusienne (1989-1990), and Royale Union Jemappes-Flénu (1990-1998).

The club joined the Belgian FA and started at the lowest provincial level, back then the fourth provincial division. After two seasons at that level, and four seasons in the third provincial division, the club remained for over a decade in the second provincial division, before starting a rapid rise. Flénu rose four levels in five seasons, winning promotions in 2022 (to the first provincial division), 2023 (to the Belgian Division 3), 2025 (to the Belgian Division 2), and 2026 (to the Belgian Division 1).

== Players ==
=== First-team squad ===
As of 5 September 2026.

Note: Flags indicate national team as defined under FIFA eligibility rules; some limited exceptions apply. Players may hold more than one non-FIFA nationality.

No.	Pos.	Nation	Player
1	GK	BEL	Dalyan Lamblin
4	DF	BEL	Théo Wuillot
5	MF	BEL	Adam Zaânan
6	MF	BEL	Noa Recchia
7	FW	CPV	Alex Soares
9	FW	FRA	Mathéo Vroman
10	FW	BEL	Ayoub Belasfar
11	FW	BEL	Tom Scohy
12	GK	BEL	Kylian Dubois
14	MF	BEL	Alessio Petta
15	DF	BEL	Mohan Lagneaux
17	DF	BEL	Cyril Soupart
19	DF	BEL	Mohamed Amallah
19	FW	BEL	Noakim Ratib
23	GK	BEL	Adrien Saussez

No.	Pos.	Nation	Player
25	DF	BEL	Aeno Ouzrouhene
27	MF	BEL	Felipe de Oliveira
41	MF	BEL	Mateo Scohy
44	MF	BEL	Sofiane Ben Madhkour
55	MF	BEL	Mégan Laurent
77	DF	BEL	Mahdi Chebaïki
97	MF	BEL	Samir Belasfar
99	MF	BEL	Olivier Mukwakani
—	MF	BEL	Nathan Durieux
—	MF	BEL	Florian Maes
—	MF	BEL	Akram Kaddouri
—	FW	BEL	Oscar Payen
—	FW	BEL	Benjamin Lupant
—	FW	CMR	Jamal Njieme
