= Adrien Saussez =

Belgian footballer (born 1991)

Personal information
- Date of birth: 25 August 1991 (age 35)
- Place of birth: Mons, Belgium
- Height: 1.82 m (6 ft 0 in)
- Position: Goalkeeper

Team information
- Current team: Flénu
- Number: 23

Youth career
- –2010: Mons

Senior career*
Years	Team	Apps	(Gls)
2010–2015	Mons	53	(0)
2016	Tubize	2	(0)
2016–2021	Union SG	88	(0)
2021–2024	Francs Borains	84	(0)
2024–2026	Olympic Charleroi	30	(0)
2026–	Flénu		
- * Club domestic league appearances and goals as of 21 January 2026

Adrien Saussez (born 25 August 1991) is a Belgian professional footballer who plays as a goalkeeper for Belgian Division 1 club Flénu.

== Career ==
Saussez started playing football for Mons. He became a free agent in July 2015, after the formal bankruptcy of the club. In January 2016, he signed with Tubize. After six months at the club, he joined Union Saint-Gilloise.

In November 2021, Saussez signed with Francs Borains after first goalkeeper Maxime Vandermeulen suffered a hip injury. In the summer 2024, he moved to Belgian Division 1 club Olympic Charleroi.
