= Fernando Canesin =

Brazilian footballer (born 1992)

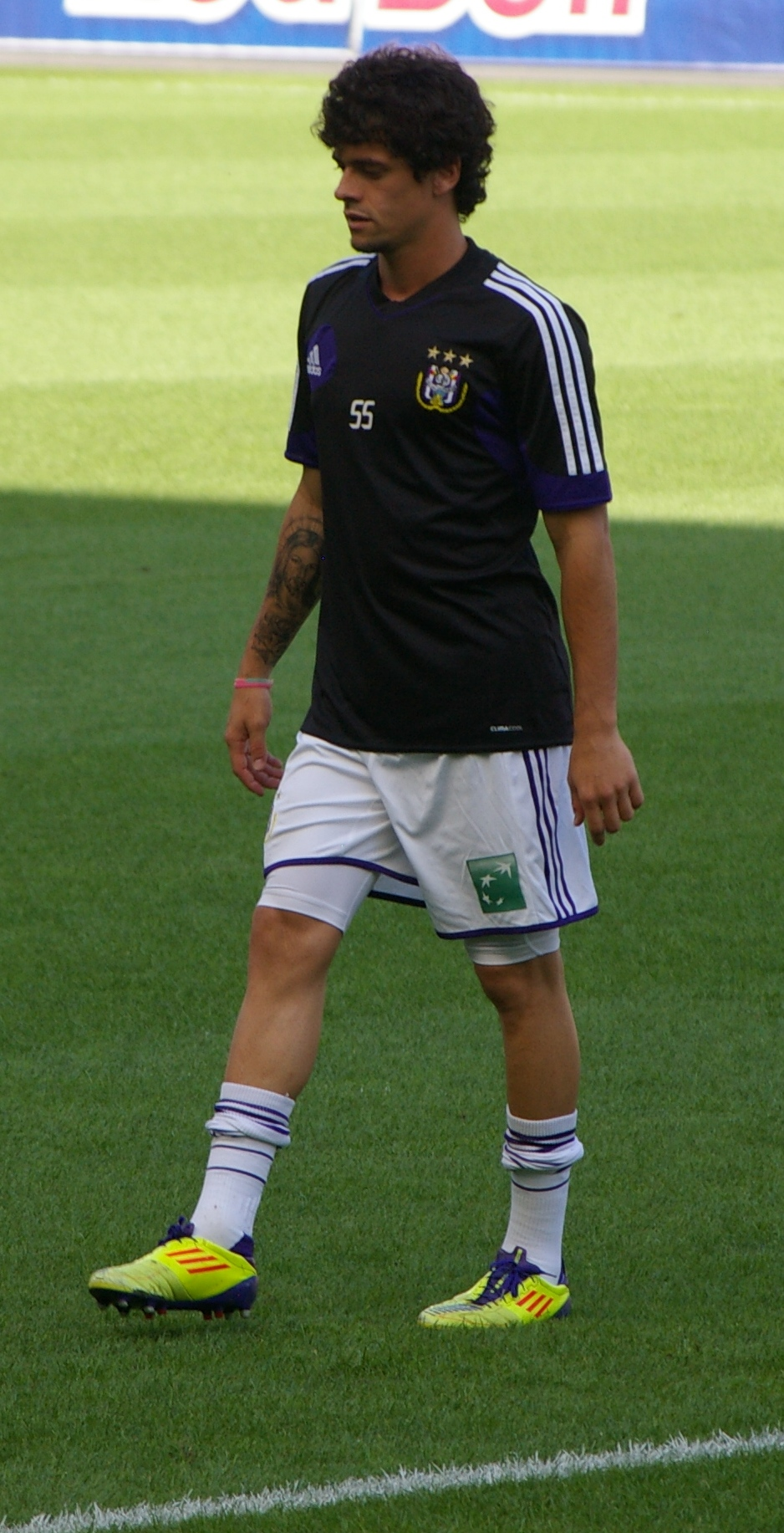
- Canesin in 2012

Personal information
- Full name: Fernando Canesin Matos
- Date of birth: 27 February 1992 (age 34)
- Place of birth: Ribeirão Preto, Brazil
- Height: 1.76 m (5 ft 9 in)
- Position: Attacking midfielder

Team information
- Current team: Ituano

Youth career
- 1999–2006: Palestra São Bernardo
- 2006–2007: Rio Branco-SP
- 2007–2009: Olé Brasil
- 2009–2011: Anderlecht

Senior career*
Years	Team	Apps	(Gls)
2011–2014	Anderlecht	38	(1)
2013–2014	→ Oostende (loan)	30	(3)
2014–2019	Oostende	178	(18)
2020–2021	Athletico Paranaense	31	(1)
2022–2023	Cruzeiro	19	(0)
2023	Inter de Limeira	6	(0)
2023	Criciúma	6	(0)
2024	Inter de Limeira	2	(0)
2025–	Ituano	29	(2)
- * Club domestic league appearances and goals as of 11 November 2026

Fernando Canesin Matos (born 27 February 1992) is a Brazilian footballer who plays for Ituano as an attacking midfielder.

== Career statistics ==
As of 13 October 2021

Appearances and goals by club, season and competition
Club	Season	League			State League		Cup		Continental		Other		Total	
Club	Season	Division	Apps	Goals	Apps	Goals	Apps	Goals	Apps	Goals	Apps	Goals	Apps	Goals
Anderlecht	2010–11	Belgian Pro League	1	0	—		0	0	—		0	0	1	0
Anderlecht	2011–12	Belgian Pro League	33	1	—		1	0	9 (Note: Appearance(s) in UEFA Europa League)	1	—		43	2
Anderlecht	2012–13	Belgian Pro League	4	0	—		2	0	3 (Note: Appearance(s) in UEFA Champions League)	1	—		9	1
Anderlecht	2013–14	Belgian Pro League	0	0	—		0	0	0	0	—		0	0
Anderlecht	Total		38	1	—		3	0	12	2	—		53	3
KV Oostende	2013–14	Belgian Pro League	30	3	—		6	0	—		0	0	36	3
KV Oostende	2014–15	Belgian Pro League	35	2	—		2	1	—		0	0	37	3
KV Oostende	2015–16	Belgian Pro League	36	7	—		1	0	—		0	0	37	7
KV Oostende	2016–17	Belgian First Division A	33	1	—		6	0	—		1 (Note: Appearance(s) in Championship play-offs)	0	40	1
KV Oostende	2017–18	Belgian First Division A	20	1	—		2	0	2	0	9	0	33	1
KV Oostende	2018–19	Belgian First Division A	25	4	—		5	0	—		3	2	33	6
KV Oostende	2019–20	Belgian First Division A	16	1	—		1	0	—		—		17	1
KV Oostende	Total		195	19	—		23	1	2	0	13	2	233	22
Athletico Paranaense	2020	Série A	16	1	3	0	0	0	1 (Note: Appearance(s) in Copa Libertadores)	0	1 (Note: Appearance(s) in Supercopa do Brasil)	0	21	1
Athletico Paranaense	2021	Série A	8	1	4	0	2	0	9 (Note: Appearance(s) in Copa Sudamericana)	1	—		23	2
Athletico Paranaense	Total		24	2	7	0	2	0	10	1	1	0	44	3
Career totals			257	22	7	0	28	1	24	3	14	2	330	28

== Honours ==
R.S.C. Anderlecht

- Belgian First Division: 2011–12
- Belgian Supercup: 2012

Athletico Paranaense

- Campeonato Paranaense: 2020
- Copa Sudamericana: 2021
