= Mégan Laurent =

Belgian footballer

Personal information
- Date of birth: 24 March 1992 (age 34)
- Place of birth: Belgium
- Height: 1.71 m (5 ft 7 in)
- Position: Attacking midfielder

Team information
- Current team: Flénu
- Number: 55

Youth career
- –2012: Charleroi

Senior career*
Years	Team	Apps	(Gls)
2012–2014	KRC Mechelen	70	(17)
2014–2015	Mons	25	(5)
2015–2017	Tubize	53	(14)
2017–2018	Lierse	31	(4)
2018–2020	Eupen	14	(0)
2020–2022	Jeunesse Esch	27	(6)
2022–2024	Francs Borains	25	(1)
2024	→ Tubize-Braine (loan)	12	(2)
2025	Mons	1	(0)
2025–	Flénu	0	(0)

International career
2007	Belgium U15	1	(0)
2009	Belgium U18	1	(0)
- * Club domestic league appearances and goals as of 16 January 2026

Mégan Laurent (born 24 March 1992) is a Belgian professional footballer who plays as a midfielder for Flénu.
