= Billal Chibani =

Belgian footballer

Personal information
- Date of birth: 15 October 1998 (age 28)
- Place of birth: Duffel, Belgium
- Position: Midfielder

Team information
- Current team: Mamer 32
- Number: 13

Youth career
- Sint-Eloois-Winkel
- Club Brugge
- Lille
- USM Alger
- Royal Excel Mouscron

Senior career*
Years	Team	Apps	(Gls)
2018–2019	Royal Excel Mouscron	7	(0)
2020–2022	Nantes B	14	(1)
2023–2024	R.E. Virton	15	(1)
2024–2025	Racing Union	15	(1)
2026–	Mamer 32	13	(2)
- * Club domestic league appearances and goals as of 25 May 2026

Billal Chibani (born 15 October 1998) is a Belgian footballer who plays for Mamer 32.

== Personal life ==
Born in Belgium, Chibani is of Algerian descent.
