= Seth De Witte =

Belgian footballer

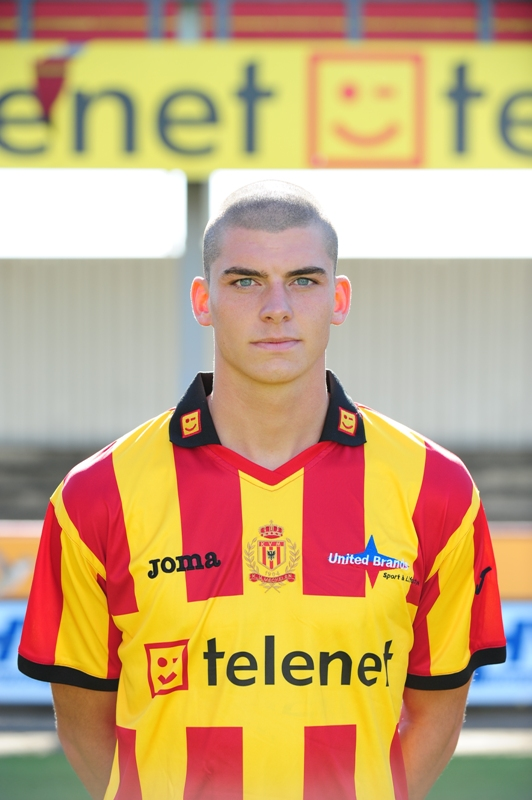
- De Witte with Mechelen

Personal information
- Date of birth: 18 October 1987 (age 39)
- Place of birth: Antwerp, Belgium
- Height: 1.93 m (6 ft 4 in)
- Positions: Centre back; defensive midfielder

Team information
- Current team: KVC Wilrijk
- Number: 4

Youth career
- 1992–1999: SV Aartselaar
- 1999–2004: Germinal Beerschot

Senior career*
Years	Team	Apps	(Gls)
2004–2005	SV Aartselaar	0	(0)
2005–2006	KFCO Wilrijk	24	(7)
2006–2010	Lierse	95	(4)
2010–2019	Mechelen	218	(23)
2019–2020	Lokeren	18	(1)
2020–2021	Deinze	19	(1)
2022	Lokeren	14	(0)
2023–	KVC Wilrijk		
- * Club domestic league appearances and goals as of 19:09, 15 January 2026 (UTC)

Seth De Witte (born 18 October 1987) is a Belgian professional footballer who plays as a centre-back or defensive midfielder for KVC Wilrijk.

== Career ==
On 26 August 2019, De Witte signed a one-year contract with Lokeren.

== Honours ==
Mechelen

- Belgian Cup: 2018–19
