= Maxime Vandermeulen =

Belgian footballer (born 1996)

Personal information
- Date of birth: 11 April 1996 (age 30)
- Place of birth: Vieux-Genappe, Belgium
- Height: 1.85 m (6 ft 1 in)
- Position: Goalkeeper

Team information
- Current team: Mons
- Number: 27

Youth career
- 2005–2014: Sporting Charleroi

Senior career*
Years	Team	Apps	(Gls)
2014–2015	Sporting Charleroi	1	(0)
2015	→ White Star Bruxelles (loan)	3	(0)
2015–2016	White Star Bruxelles	0	(0)
2016–2018	RES Couvin-Mariembourg	43	(0)
2018–2022	Francs Borains	51	(1)
2022–2023	Rebecq	28	(0)
2023–	Mons	79	(0)
- * Club domestic league appearances and goals as of 28 June 2026

Maxime Vandermeulen (born 11 April 1996) is a Belgian professional footballer who plays as a goalkeeper for Belgian Division 2 club Mons.

== Career ==
Progressing through the Sporting Charleroi youth academy, Vandermeulen made his professional debut on 20 December 2014 as a starter in a 6–0 home victory in the Belgian Pro League against Lierse. Usually the third goalkeeper in the team, Vandermeulen claimed the starting spot after injuries to Nicolas Penneteau and Parfait Mandanda.

On 2 February 2015, Vandermeulen was sent on loan to Belgian Second Division club White Star Bruxelles for the second half of the 2014–15 season. He made his debut for the club on 7 February 2015 in a 1–1 draw against Racing Mechelen. The club signed him on a permanent deal 2015, but after White Star filed for bankruptcy in 2016 after winning the title, Vandermeulen moved to Couvin-Mariembourg competing in the Belgian Second Amateur Division.

In 2018, Vandermeulen signed with Francs Borains, also competing in the Belgian Second Amateur Division. During the 2019–20 season, Vandermeulen scored his first goal in a 3–0 win over Meux. His wind-assisted free kick from his own half at Stade Robert Urbain sealed the win. In November 2021, Vandermeulen suffered a hip injury, sidelining him for at least three months. Francs Borains brought in Adrien Saussez as his replacement.

On 14 June 2022, Vandermeulen joined Rebecq. After one season at the club, he moved to recently promoted Belgian Division 2 club Mons.

== Honours ==
White Star Bruxelles

- Belgian Second Division: 2015–16
