= Enes Sağlık =

Belgian footballer

Personal information
- Full name: Enes Mahmut Sağlık
- Date of birth: 8 July 1991 (age 35)
- Place of birth: Verviers, Belgium
- Height: 1.70 m (5 ft 7 in)
- Position: Midfielder

Youth career
- 1997–2007: Etoile FC Wegnez
- 2007–2010: Eupen

Senior career*
Years	Team	Apps	(Gls)
2009–2012	Eupen	73	(8)
2012–2014	Lokeren	36	(1)
2014–2020	Charleroi	107	(7)
2019	→ Tubize (loan)	6	(0)
2020–2021	Mouscron	2	(0)
2021–2022	Menemenspor	8	(0)
2022–2023	Adanaspor	3	(0)

International career
2010	Belgium U19	2	(0)
2011	Belgium U21	2	(0)
- * Club domestic league appearances and goals as of 21 May 2023

Enes Sağlık (born 8 July 1991) is a Belgian footballer who plays as a midfielder.

== Club career ==
On 1 September 2021, he signed with Menemenspor in Turkey for one year with an optional second.

== Career statistics ==
=== Club ===
As of match played 5 August 2017

Club	Season	League			Belgian Cup		Europe		Other		Total	
Club	Season	Division	Apps	Goals	Apps	Goals	Apps	Goals	Apps	Goals	Apps	Goals
Eupen	2009–10	Second Division	13	0	0	0	~	~	~	~	13	0
Eupen	2010–11	Pro League	28	0	2	0	~	~	~	~	30	0
Eupen	2011–12	Second Division	32	8	2	1	~	~	5 (Note: Appearances in the Second Division promotion play-offs)	3	39	12
Eupen	K.A.S. Eupen		73	8	6	1	~	~	5	3	84	12
Lokeren	2012–13	Pro League	31	1	2	0	0	0	0	0	33	1
Lokeren	2013–14	Pro League	5	0	1	0	~	~	~	~	6	0
Lokeren	K.S.C. Lokeren O-V		36	1	3	0	0	0	0	0	39	1
Charleroi	2013–14	Pro League	12	1	~	~	~	~	~	~	12	1
Charleroi	2014–15	Pro League	29	2	2	1	~	~	~	~	31	3
Charleroi	2015–16	Pro League	38	3	2	0	4 (Note: Appearances in the Europa League)	1	~	~	44	4
Charleroi	2016–17	First Division A	10	1	0	0	~	~	~	~	10	1
Charleroi	2017–18	First Division A	2	0	0	0	~	~	0	0	2	0
Charleroi	Standard Charleroi		91	7	4	1	4	1	0	0	99	9
Career total			200	16	13	2	4	1	5	3	222	22
