= Nebojša Pavlović (footballer) =

Serbian footballer

Personal information
- Full name: Nebojša Pavlović
- Date of birth: 9 April 1981 (age 45)
- Place of birth: Belgrade, SFR Yugoslavia
- Height: 1.89 m (6 ft 2 in)
- Position: Defensive midfielder

Youth career
- Čukarički

Senior career*
Years	Team	Apps	(Gls)
2000–2004	Čukarički	88	(4)
2004–2005	Apulum Alba Iulia	0	(0)
2005	Rad	28	(1)
2006–2007	Gent	43	(6)
2007–2009	Lokeren	49	(1)
2009–2017	Kortrijk	229	(15)
- * Club domestic league appearances and goals

Nebojša Pavlović (Serbian Cyrillic: Небојша Павловић; born 9 April 1981) is a Serbian retired footballer who played as a defensive midfielder.
