= Guillaume François =

Belgian footballer

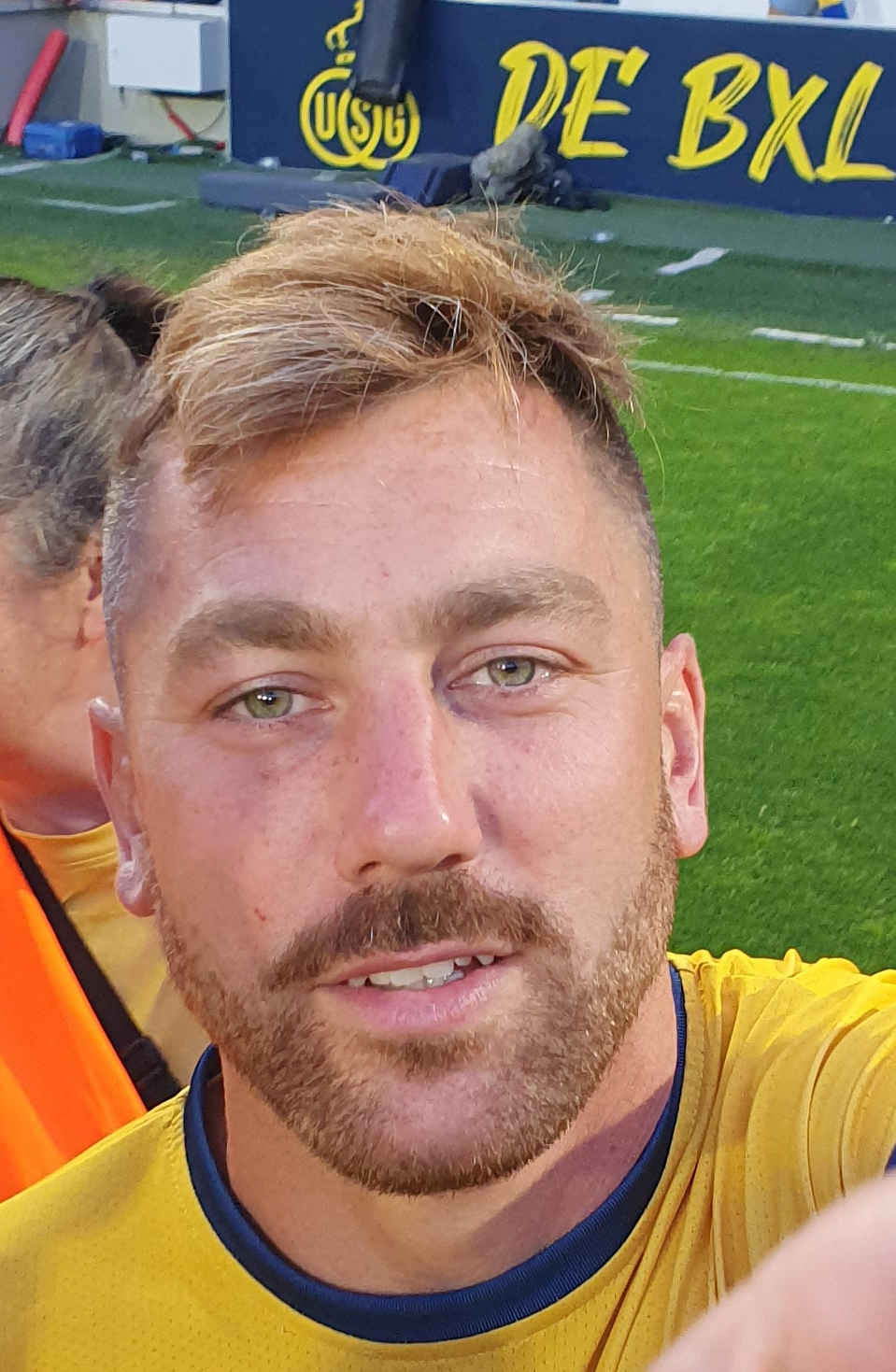
- François in 2023

Personal information
- Date of birth: 3 June 1990 (age 36)
- Place of birth: Libramont, Belgium
- Height: 1.73 m (5 ft 8 in)
- Position: Defender

Senior career*
Years	Team	Apps	(Gls)
2008–2009	Mouscron	22	(2)
2010–2013	Germinal Beerschot	71	(6)
2013–2016	Charleroi	72	(1)
2016–2018	Beerschot Wilrijk	55	(8)
2018–2020	Virton	45	(5)
2020–2026	Union SG	69	(1)

International career
2007	Belgium U17	12	(1)
2007–2008	Belgium U18	11	(2)
2008–2009	Belgium U19	15	(3)
2010–2012	Belgium U21	8	(0)
- * Club domestic league appearances and goals

Guillaume François (born 3 June 1990) is a Belgian former professional footballer.

François retired from professional football at the end of the 2025–26 season.

== Career statistics ==
As of match played 24 May 2026

Appearances and goals by club, season and competition
Club	Season	League			Belgian Cup		Europe		Other		Total	
Club	Season	Division	Apps	Goals	Apps	Goals	Apps	Goals	Apps	Goals	Apps	Goals
Mouscron	2008–09	Belgian Pro League	6	0	1	0	—		—		7	0
Mouscron	2009–10	Belgian Pro League	16	2	1	1	—		—		17	3
Mouscron	Total		22	2	2	1	—		—		24	3
Germinal Beerschot	2009–10	Belgian Pro League	7	0	—		—		—		7	0
Germinal Beerschot	2010–11	Belgian Pro League	15	2	1	0	—		—		16	2
Germinal Beerschot	2011–12	Belgian Pro League	31	3	2	0	—		—		33	3
Germinal Beerschot	2012–13	Belgian Pro League	18	1	1	0	—		—		19	1
Germinal Beerschot	Total		71	6	4	0	—		—		75	6
Charleroi	2012–13	Belgian Pro League	9	0	—		—		—		9	0
Charleroi	2013–14	Belgian Pro League	33	1	1	0	—		—		34	1
Charleroi	2014–15	Belgian Pro League	26	0	4	0	—		—		30	0
Charleroi	2015–16	Belgian Pro League	4	0	0	0	1 (Note: Appearances in UEFA Europa League)	0	—		5	0
Charleroi	Total		72	1	5	0	1	0	—		78	1
Beerschot	2016–17	Belgian Division 3	22	4	0	0	—		—		22	4
Beerschot	2017–18	Challenger Pro League	33	4	1	0	—		—		34	4
Beerschot	Total		55	8	1	0	—		—		56	8
Virton	2018–19	Belgian Division 3	34	5	2	0	—		—		36	5
Virton	2019–20	Challenger Pro League	11	0	0	0	—		—		11	0
Virton	Total		45	5	2	0	—		—		47	5
Union SG	2020–21	Challenger Pro League	18	1	0	0	—		—		18	1
Union SG	2021–22	Belgian Pro League	24	0	1	0	—		—		25	0
Union SG	2022–23	Belgian Pro League	17	0	2	0	5 (Note: Two appearances in the UEFA Champions League, three appearances in the UEFA Europa League)	0	—		24	0
Union SG	2023–24	Belgian Pro League	5	0	2	0	0	0	—		7	0
Union SG	2024–25	Belgian Pro League	3	0	1	0	0	0	—		4	0
Union SG	2025–26	Belgian Pro League	2	0	1	0	0	0	0	0	3	0
Union SG	Total		69	1	7	0	5	0	0	0	81	1
Career total			334	23	21	1	6	0	0	0	371	24

== Honours ==
Union SG

- Belgian Pro League: 2024–25
- Challenger Pro League: 2020–21
- Belgian Cup: 2023–24, 2025–26
