= Mohamed Daf =

Senegalese footballer (born 1994)

Personal information
- Full name: Mohamed Daf
- Date of birth: 10 March 1994 (age 32)
- Place of birth: Senegal
- Position: Midfielder

Youth career
- –2013: R.S.C. Anderlecht

Senior career*
Years	Team	Apps	(Gls)
2013–2016	Sporting Charleroi	20	(2)
2015–2016	→ RWS Bruxelles (loan)	15	(2)
2016–2017	Boavista	0	(0)
2017	→ GD Gafanha (loan)	3	(0)
2017–2018	Diaraf		
2018–2019	Altay		
2019	Al-Orobah	1	(0)
2020–	Diaraf	1	(0)
- * Club domestic league appearances and goals as of 9 March 2017 (UTC)

Mohamed Daf (born 13 March 1994) is a Senegalese footballer who currently plays as a midfielder for Diaraf
