= Clément Tainmont =

French footballer (born 1986)

Personal information
- Date of birth: 13 February 1986 (age 40)
- Place of birth: Valenciennes, France
- Height: 1.85 m (6 ft 1 in)
- Position: Left winger

Team information
- Current team: Francs Borains
- Number: 7

Youth career
- 1991–2006: Valenciennes

Senior career*
| Years | Team | Apps | (Gls) |
| 2006–2007 | Lesquin | 30 | (5) |
| 2007–2009 | Dunkerque | 61 | (15) |
| 2009–2012 | Reims | 64 | (11) |
| 2010–2011 | → Amiens (loan) | 28 | (5) |
| 2012–2014 | Châteauroux | 48 | (7) |
| 2014–2018 | Charleroi | 118 | (14) |
| 2018–2020 | K.V. Mechelen | 54 | (5) |
| 2021–2022 | Mouscron | 24 | (3) |
| 2023– | Francs Borains | 32 | (7) |
- * Club domestic league appearances and goals as of 12 May 2024

Clément Tainmont (born 13 February 1986) is a French professional footballer who plays as a left winger for Belgian club Francs Borains in Challenger Pro League.

== Club career ==
Tainmont began his career with professional club Valenciennes under the tutelage of former manager Daniel Leclercq. Tainmont previously played for amateur club Dunkerque, Amiens SC and Châteauroux.

On 28 January 2014, he left France for Belgian Pro League side Sporting Charleroi on a 2 1/2-year deal.

After not playing in the 2020–21 season, on 13 July 2021 he signed a one-year contract with Mouscron, after a try-out.

== Honours ==
Mechelen

- Belgian Cup: 2018–19
