= Stade Yvan Georges =

(Belgium) Stade Yvan Georges
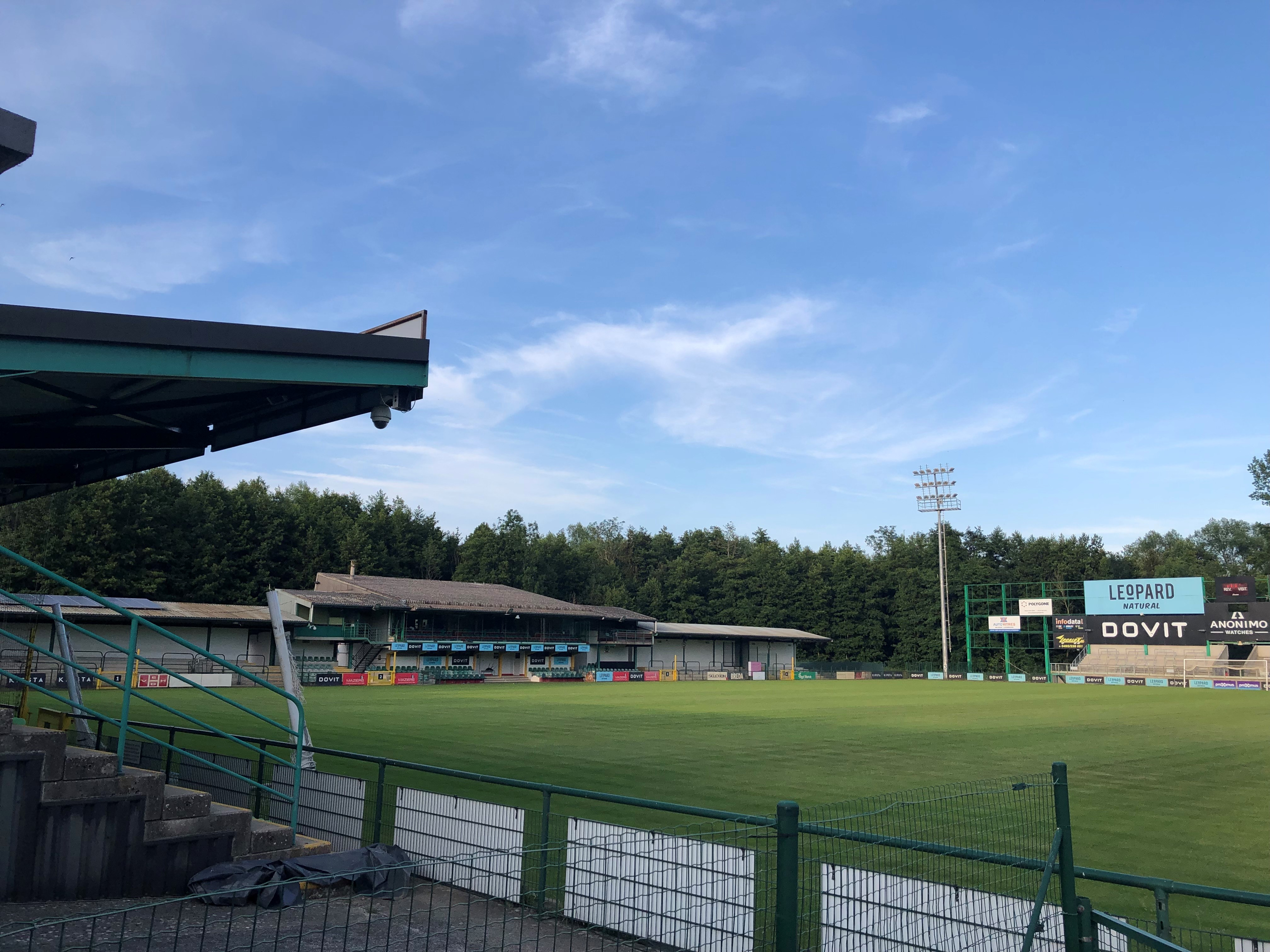
- Interactive map of (Belgium) Stade Yvan Georges
- Location: Virton, Belgium
- Coordinates: 49.5625°N 5.5306°E
- Capacity: 4,015
- Surface: Grass

Tenant
- Excelsior Virton

Stade Yvan Georges is a stadium in Virton, Belgium. It is used for football matches and is the home ground of Excelsior Virton. The stadium holds 4,015 spectators.
