= 2019–20 Royal Antwerp FC season =

Royal Antwerp
2019–20 season
- Owner: Paul Gheysens
- Manager: Ivan Leko
- Stadium: Bosuilstadion
- Belgian First Division A: 4th
- Belgian Cup: Winners
- UEFA Europa League: Play-off round
- Top goalscorer: League: Dieumerci Mbokani (18); All: Dieumerci Mbokani (24)
Home colours	Away colours	Third colours

The 2019–20 Royal Antwerp F.C. season was the club's 116th season in existence and the club's 8th consecutive season in the top flight of Belgian football. In addition to the domestic league, Antwerp participated in this season's editions of the Belgian Cup and UEFA Europa League. The season covered the period from 1 July 2019 to 1 August 2020.

== Players ==
=== Current squad ===
As of 12 February 2020

Note: Flags indicate national team as defined under FIFA eligibility rules; some limited exceptions apply. Players may hold more than one non-FIFA nationality.

No.	Pos.	Nation	Player
--	GK	FRA	Jean Butez
2	DF	BEL	Ritchie De Laet
3	DF	SEN	Abdoulaye Seck
5	DF	BRA	Matheus
6	DF	NOR	Simen Juklerød
7	FW	CMR	Didier Lamkel Zé
8	MF	POR	Ivo Rodrigues
11	MF	ISR	Lior Refaelov
12	DF	COD	Luete Ava Dongo
--	MF	CMR	Frank Boya
--	MF	BEL	Birger Verstraete
17	DF	BEL	Robbe Quirynen
18	DF	CMR	Martin Hongla

No.	Pos.	Nation	Player
19	MF	JPN	Koji Miyoshi
20	MF	BEL	Sander Coopman
21	DF	FRA	Dylan Batubinsika
25	MF	BEL	Alexis De Sart
28	FW	BEL	Manuel Benson
30	DF	POR	Aurélio Buta
31	GK	BEL	Yves De Winter
38	MF	BEL	Faris Haroun (Captain)
40	DF	NGR	Junior Pius
70	FW	COD	Dieumerci Mbokani
--	GK	CRO	Davor Matijaš
--	MF	UKR	Yehor Nazaryna

== Transfers ==
=== In ===
No.	Pos	Player	Transferred from	Fee	Date	Source
25	MF	(Belgium) Alexis De Sart	(Belgium) Sint-Truiden	Undisclosed	10 July 2019	
20	MF	(Belgium) Sander Coopman	(Belgium) Oostende	Undisclosed	4 July 2019	

=== Out ===
No.	Pos	Player	Transferred to	Fee	Date	Source
	FW	(Ghana) William Owusu	(United Arab Emirates) Ajman	Free	1 July 2019	
	MF	(Portugal) David Simão	(Greece) AEK Athens	Undisclosed	1 July 2019	

== Pre-season and friendlies ==
Win Draw Loss

2 July 2019 Friendly	SV Meppen (Germany)	2–2	(Belgium) Antwerp	Harsewinkel, Germany
17:00 CEST (UTC+2)				Stadium: Sportanlage Klosterpforte

6 July 2019 Friendly	Antwerp (Belgium)	1–1	(Germany) 1. FC Magdeburg	Harsewinkel, Germany
15:00 CEST (UTC+2)				Stadium: Sportanlage Klosterpforte

10 July 2019 Friendly	Antwerp (Belgium)	2–0	(Croatia) Lokomotiva	Antwerp, Belgium
17:00 CEST (UTC+2)				Stadium: Bosuilstadion

13 July 2019 Friendly	Antwerp (Belgium)	0–0	(France) Valenciennes	Saint-Amand-les-Eaux, France
17:00 CEST (UTC+2)				Stadium: Stade Municipal

8 July 2020 Friendly	Antwerp (Belgium)	0–1	(Belgium) Eupen	Antwerp, Belgium
18:00 CEST (UTC+2)				Stadium: Bosuilstadion

18 July 2020 Friendly	Antwerp (Belgium)	0–0	(Netherlands) FC Utrecht	Antwerp, Belgium
17:00 CEST (UTC+2)				Stadium: Bosuilstadion

22 July 2020 Friendly	Antwerp (Belgium)	1–3	(Netherlands) Roda JC	Antwerp, Belgium
14:00 CEST (UTC+2)	Bolingi 50'		Croux 2', 66'; Goppel 29'	Stadium: Bosuilstadion

24 July 2020 Friendly	Antwerp (Belgium)	2–3	(France) Lyon	Antwerp, Belgium
16:00 CEST (UTC+2)	Rodrigues (yellow card) 30'; Verstraete (yellow card) 59'; Hongla 70'; Buta 78'		Dembélé 24'; Seck 45' (o.g.); Cornet 49'	Stadium: Bosuilstadion; Attendance: 0

== Competitions ==
Win Draw Loss

=== Overview ===
Competition	First match	Last match	Starting round	Final position	Record							
Competition	First match	Last match	Starting round	Final position	Pld	W	D	L	GF	GA	GD	Win %
Belgian First Division A	6 August 2019	7 March 2020	Matchday 1	4th	29	15	8	6	49	32	+17	51.72
Belgian Cup	26 September 2019	1 August 2020	Sixth round	Winners	6	4	2	0	13	7	+6	66.67
UEFA Europa League	8 August 2019	29 August 2019	Third qualifying round	Play-off round	4	1	1	2	4	7	−3	25.00
Total					39	20	11	8	66	46	+20	51.28

Last updated: 1 August 2020
Source: Soccerway

=== Belgian First Division A ===
==== League table ====
Pos	Team	Pld	W	D	L	GF	GA	GD	Pts	Qualification or relegation
2	Gent	29	16	7	6	59	34	+25	55	Qualification for the Champions League third qualifying round
3	Charleroi	29	15	9	5	49	23	+26	54	Qualification for the Europa League third qualifying round
4	Antwerp (Y)	29	15	8	6	49	32	+17	53	Qualification for the Europa League group stage (Note: Antwerp qualified for the Europa League group stage as the 2019–20 Belgian Cup winners.)
5	Standard Liège	29	14	7	8	47	32	+15	49	Qualification for the Europa League second qualifying round
6	Mechelen	29	13	5	11	46	43	+3	44	

Source: Belgian First Division A (in Dutch), Soccerway
Rules for classification: 1) Points; 2) Matches won; 3) Goal difference; 4) Goals scored; 5) Away goals scored; 6) Away matches won; 7) Play-off.
(Y) Croky Cup winner

==== Results summary ====
Overall								Home						Away					
Pld	W	D	L	GF	GA	GD	Pts	W	D	L	GF	GA	GD	W	D	L	GF	GA	GD
29	15	8	6	49	32	+17	53	10	4	0	28	12	+16	5	4	6	21	20	+1

Last updated: 7 March 2020.
Source: Jupiler Pro League

==== Results by round ====
Round	1	2	3	4	5	6	7	8	9	10	11	12	13	14	15	16	17	18	19	20	21	22	23	24	25	26	27	28	29	30
Ground	A	H	A	H	A	A	H	A	H	A	H	A	A	H	H	A	H	A	H	A	H	A	H	A	H	H	A	H	A	H
Result	W	W	L	W	L	W	W	D	D	L	W	D	L	W	W	D	W	W	W	D	D	W	W	L	D	D	L	W	W	C
Position	1	2	4	4	9	5	2	4	4	5	5	6	7	6	4	4	5	4	2	3	4	3	3	4	3	4	4	5	4	4

Updated to match(es) played on 7 March 2020. Source: Jupiler Pro League
A = Away; H = Home; W = Win; D = Draw; L = Loss

==== Matches ====
On 2 April 2020, the Jupiler Pro League's board of directors proposed to cancel the season due to the COVID-19 pandemic. The General Assembly accepted the proposal on 15 May, and officially ended the 2019–20 season.

28 July 2019 1	KAS Eupen	1–4	Antwerp	Eupen
18:00 CEST (UTC+2)				Stadium: Kehrwegstadion

4 August 2019 2	Antwerp	4–1	Waasland-Beveren	Antwerp
18:00 CEST (UTC+2)				Stadium: Bosuilstadion

11 August 2019 3	Sporting Charleroi	2–1	Antwerp	Charleroi
18:00 CEST (UTC+2)				Stadium: Stade du Pays de Charleroi

18 August 2019 4	Antwerp	2–0	Sint-Truiden	Antwerp
18:00 CEST (UTC+2)				Stadium: Bosuilstadion

1 September 2019 5	Zulte Waregem	2–0	Antwerp	Waregem
18:00 CEST (UTC+2)				Stadium: Regenboogstadion

15 September 2019 6	Anderlecht	1–2	Antwerp	Anderlecht
18:00 CEST (UTC+2)				Stadium: Constant Vanden Stock Stadium

21 September 2019 7	Antwerp	3–1	Cercle Brugge KSV	Antwerp
18:00 CEST (UTC+2)				Stadium: Bosuilstadion

29 September 2019 8	KV Oostende	1–1	Antwerp	Ostend
18:00 CEST (UTC+2)				Stadium: Versluys Arena

6 October 2019 9	Antwerp	2–2	Standard Liège	Antwerp
18:00 CEST (UTC+2)	Refaelov 23' (pen.); Lamkel Zé (yellow card) 27'; Mbokani 55'; Arslanagić (yellow card) 75'; Hoedt (yellow card) 88'	Report	Vanheusden (yellow card) 27'; Emond 58', 72'; M'Poku (yellow card) 90'	Stadium: Bosuilstadion; Attendance: 12,978; Referee: Erik Lambrechts

20 October 2019 10	KV Mechelen	3–1	Antwerp	Mechelen
18:00 CEST (UTC+2)				Stadium: Achter de Kazerne

26 October 2019 11	Antwerp	3–1	Kortrijk	Antwerp
18:00 CEST (UTC+2)				Stadium: Bosuilstadion

30 October 2019 12	Genk	2–2	Antwerp	Genk
20:30 CET (UTC+1)	Samatta 69'; Berge 90+6'	Report	Lamkel Zé 8', (yellow card) 45+1'; Rodrigues (yellow card) 33' (yellow-red card) 82', (goal) 47'; De Sart (yellow card) 63'	Stadium: Luminus Arena; Referee: Wesley Alen

2 November 2019 13	Mouscron	3–1	Antwerp	Mouscron
18:00 CET (UTC+1)				Stadium: Stade Le Canonnier

10 November 2019 14	Antwerp	2–1	Club Brugge	Antwerp
14:30 CET (UTC+1)	Haroun (yellow card) 33'; Bolat (yellow card) 42'; Miyoshi (yellow card) 45+1'; Mbokani 49' (pen.); Mignolet 64' (o.g.); Lamkel Zé (yellow card) 65'; De Sart (yellow card) 78'; Hoedt (yellow card) 79'	Report	Schrijvers 25'; Álvarez (yellow card) 61'; Vanaken (yellow card) 75'; Vormer (yellow card) 77'	Stadium: Bosuilstadion; Attendance: 16,649; Referee: Bram Van Driessche

21 November 2019 15	Antwerp	3–2	Gent	Antwerp
20:30 CET (UTC+1)	Mbokani 25', 48'; Refaelov 33'; Rodrigues (yellow card) 39'; Haroun (yellow card) 64'; De Laet (yellow card) 86'; Arslanagić (yellow card) 90+5'	Report	Yaremchuk 21', (yellow card) 86'; Owusu (yellow card) 31'; Kums (yellow card) 47'; Bezus (yellow card) 83'; Jonathan David (yellow card) 85', (goal) 90+4'	Stadium: Bosuilstadion; Attendance: 12,500; Referee: Nicolas Laforge

24 November 2019 16	Gent	1–1	Antwerp	Ghent
14:30 CET (UTC+1)	Yaremchuk 13'; Kums (yellow card) 90+1'	Report	Arslanagić (yellow card) 25'; Mbokani (yellow card) 42'; De Sart (yellow card) 60'; De Laet (yellow card) 62'; Lamkel Zé (yellow card) 78'; Haroun (yellow card) 81'; Gano 90+4'	Stadium: Ghelamco Arena; Attendance: 19,491; Referee: Lawrence Visser

29 November 2019 17	Antwerp	1–0	KV Mechelen	Antwerp
18:00 CET (UTC+1)				Stadium: Bosuilstadion

6 December 2019 18	Waasland-Beveren	0–4	Antwerp	Beveren
18:00 CET (UTC+1)				Stadium: Freethiel Stadion

14 December 2019 19	Antwerp	1–0	KAS Eupen	Antwerp
18:00 CET (UTC+1)				Stadium: Bosuilstadion

22 December 2019 20	Sint-Truiden	1–1	Antwerp	Sint-Truiden
18:00 CET (UTC+1)				Stadium: Stayen

27 December 2019 21	Antwerp	0–0	Anderlecht	Antwerp
18:00 CET (UTC+1)				Stadium: Bosuilstadion

19 January 2020 22	Cercle Brugge KSV	1–2	Antwerp	Bruges
18:00 CET (UTC+1)				Stadium: Jan Breydel Stadium

26 January 2020 23	Antwerp	2–1	Zulte Waregem	Antwerp
18:00 CET (UTC+1)				Stadium: Bosuilstadion

2 February 2020 24	Club Brugge	1–0	Antwerp	Bruges
18:00 CET (UTC+1)	Dennis (yellow card) 27'; Vanaken 84'; Sobol (yellow card) 90+1'	Report	Rodrigues (yellow card) 27'; Arslanagić (yellow card) 28'	Stadium: Jan Breydel Stadium; Attendance: 26,000; Referee: Erik Lambrechts

13 February 2020 25	Antwerp	1–1	Genk	Antwerp
18:00 CET (UTC+1)	Juklerød (yellow card) 30'; Mæhle 39' (o.g.); Buta (yellow card) 50'	Report	Onuachu 12'; Wouters (yellow card) 86'; Lucumí (yellow card) 88'	Stadium: Bosuilstadion; Referee: Jan Boterberg

16 February 2020 26	Antwerp	1–1	Sporting Charleroi	Antwerp
18:00 CET (UTC+1)				Stadium: Bosuilstadion

22 February 2020 27	Standard Liège	1–0	Antwerp	Liège
18:00 CET (UTC+1)	Oularé 33'; Amallah (yellow card) 38'	Report	Seck (yellow card) 45+1'; Defour (yellow card) 77'; Hoedt (yellow card) 90+5'	Stadium: Stade Maurice Dufrasne; Attendance: 27,143; Referee: Nathan Verboomen

29 February 2020 28	Antwerp	3–1	KV Oostende	Antwerp
18:00 CET (UTC+1)				Stadium: Bosuilstadion

7 March 2020 29	KV Kortrijk	0–1	Antwerp	Kortrijk
18:00 CET (UTC+1)				Stadium: Guldensporen Stadion

15 March 2020 30	Antwerp	Cancelled	Mouscron	Antwerp
18:00 CET (UTC+1)				Stadium: Bosuilstadion
Note: The match was cancelled due to the COVID-19 pandemic.

=== Belgian Cup ===
26 September 2019 Sixth round	Antwerp	4–2 (a.e.t.)	Lokeren	Antwerp
20:30 CEST (UTC+2)	Mbokani 5'; Miyoshi 33', 98'; Baby 114'	Report	Beridze 1'; Navarro 83'	Stadium: Bosuilstadion

3 December 2019 Seventh round	Antwerp	3–3 (a.e.t.) (4–3 p)	Genk	Antwerp
20:45 CET (UTC+1)	Juklerød 29'; Haroun (yellow card) 40'; Buta (yellow card) 64'; Mbokani 72', 105'; De Sart (yellow card) 96'; Hoedt (yellow card) 99'	Report	Mæhle 4'; Cuesta (yellow card) 70'; Dewaest (yellow card) 76'; Hoedt 80' (o.g.); Ndongala (yellow card) 83'; Borges (yellow card) 89'; Ito 105+1'	Stadium: Bosuilstadion; Referee: Lothar D'Hondt
	Penalties
	Refaelov (penalty scored); Hoedt (penalty missed); Buta (penalty scored); Juklerød (penalty scored); Mbokani (penalty scored)		(penalty scored) Samatta; (penalty scored) Berge; (penalty scored) Lucumí; (penalty missed) Ito; (penalty missed) Wouters

18 December 2019 Quarter-final	Standard Liège	1–3	Antwerp	Liège
20:45 CET (UTC+1)	Lestienne 24'	Report	De Laet 48'; Benson 67'; Mbokani 85'	Stadium: Stade Maurice Dufrasne; Attendance: Erik Lambrechts

23 January 2020 Semi-final 1st leg	Antwerp	1–1	Kortrijk	Antwerp
20:45 CET (UTC+1)	Mbokani 84'	Report	Stojanović 70'	Stadium: Bosuilstadion; Referee: Jonathan Lardot

6 February 2020 Semi-final 2nd leg	Kortrijk	0–1 (1–2 agg.)	Antwerp	Kortrijk
20:45 CET (UTC+1)		Report	Refaelov 36' (pen.)	Stadium: Guldensporen Stadion; Referee: Nicolas Laforge

1 August 2020 Final	Club Brugge	0–1	Antwerp	Brussels
20:30 CEST (UTC+2)	Balanta (yellow card) 39'; Sobol (yellow card) 60'; Rits (yellow card) 76'; Vormer (yellow card) 90+8'	Report	Refaelov 25'; Pius (yellow card) 32'; Matijaš (yellow card) 82'; Haroun (yellow card) 90+8'	Stadium: King Baudouin Stadium; Attendance: 0 Referee: Nicolas Laforge
Note: The match was postponed due to the COVID-19 pandemic, and rescheduled to 1 August.

=== UEFA Europa League ===
==== Third qualifying round ====
8 August 2019 First leg	Antwerp (Belgium)	1–0	(Czech Republic) Viktoria Plzeň	Brussels, Belgium
19:00 CEST (UTC+2)	Seck (yellow card) 10'; Rodrigues 29'	Report	Hrošovský (yellow card) 32'; Limberský (yellow card) 72'	Stadium: King Baudouin Stadium; Attendance: 15,734; Referee: Jens Maae (Denmark)

15 August 2019 Second leg	Viktoria Plzeň (Czech Republic)	2–1 (2–2 agg.)	(Belgium) Antwerp	Plzeň, Czech Republic
20:00 CEST (UTC+2)	Krmenčík 81', 97'; Mihálik (yellow card) 109'; Hrošovský (yellow card) 117'	Report	Juklerød (yellow card) 18'; Haroun (yellow card) 57'; Bolat (yellow card) 82'; Seck (yellow card) 101' (red card) 101'; Mbokani 113'; Lamkel Zé (yellow card) 117'	Stadium: Doosan Arena; Attendance: 9,717; Referee: Davide Massa (Italy)

==== Play-off round ====
22 August 2019 First leg	AZ (Netherlands)	1–1	(Belgium) Antwerp	Enschede, Netherlands
20:30 CEST (UTC+2)	Koopmeiners (yellow card) 25'; Stengs (yellow card) 49'; Boadu 82'; Vlaar (yellow card) 85'; Idrissi (yellow card) 90+3'	Report	Batubinsika 38'; Buta (yellow card) 47' (yellow-red card) 73'; Mbokani (yellow card) 63'; Bolat (yellow card) 88'; Lamkel Zé (yellow card) 90+3'	Stadium: De Grolsch Veste; Attendance: 4,014; Referee: Srđan Jovanović (Serbia)

29 August 2019 Second leg	Antwerp (Belgium)	1–4 (a.e.t.) (2–5 agg.)	(Netherlands) AZ	Brussels, Belgium
19:30 CEST (UTC+2)	Rodrigues (yellow card) 26'; Mbokani (yellow card) 32' (yellow-red card) 35'; Lamkel Zé (yellow card) 51' (yellow-red card) 74', (goal) 73'; Seck (yellow card) 90+4'; Bolat (yellow card) 97'; Haroun (yellow card) 98'; Batubinsika (yellow card) 101'	Report	Bizot (yellow card) 36'; Boadu (yellow card) 40'; Idrissi (yellow card) 86'; Stengs 90', (yellow card) 97'; Koopmeiners (yellow card) 91', (goal) 102' (pen.); Druijf 96'; Wijndal (yellow card) 97'; Guðmundsson 113'	Stadium: King Baudouin Stadium; Attendance: 19,786; Referee: Anastasios Sidiropoulos (Greece)

== Statistics ==
=== Squad appearances and goals ===
Last updated on 1 August 2020.

No.	Pos	Nat	Player	Total		Belgian Division		Belgian Cup		UEFA Europa League	
No.	Pos	Nat	Player	Apps	Goals	Apps	Goals	Apps	Goals	Apps	Goals
Goalkeepers
1	GK	(Turkey) TUR	Sinan Bolat	36	0	27	0	5	0	4	0
31	GK	(Belgium) BEL	Yves De Winter	0	0	0	0	0	0	0	0
39	GK	(Belgium) BEL	Jens Teunckens	2	0	2	0	0	0	0	0
71	GK	(Croatia) CRO	Davor Matijaš	1	0	0	0	1	0	0	0
Defenders
2	DF	(Belgium) BEL	Ritchie De Laet	28	1	19+3	0	4	1	2	0
3	DF	(Senegal) SEN	Abdoulaye Seck	19	0	10+3	0	2+1	0	3	0
4	DF	(Ghana) GHA	Daniel Opare	0	0	0	0	0	0	0	0
5	DF	(Brazil) BRA	Matheus	0	0	0	0	0	0	0	0
6	DF	(Norway) NOR	Simen Juklerød	22	1	11+3	0	4	1	4	0
15	DF	(Belgium) BEL	Dino Arslanagić	26	0	21	0	3	0	0+2	0
17	DF	(Belgium) BEL	Robbe Quirynen	5	0	2+1	0	1	0	0+1	0
18	DF	(Cameroon) CMR	Martin Hongla	15	0	3+6	0	3+1	0	1+1	0
21	DF	(France) FRA	Dylan Batubinsika	9	1	4	0	1	0	3+1	1
22	DF	(Netherlands) NED	Wesley Hoedt	25	0	21	0	4	0	0	0
30	DF	(Portugal) POR	Aurélio Buta	35	2	28	2	4	0	3	0
40	DF	(Nigeria) NGR	Junior Pius	2	0	0	0	1	0	1	0
	DF	(Belgium) BEL	Brandon Nsimba Ndezi	1	0	0	0	0+1	0	0	0
Midfielders
8	MF	(Portugal) POR	Ivo Rodrigues	29	5	17+5	4	1+2	0	4	1
16	MF	(Belgium) BEL	Steven Defour	12	0	9+2	0	1	0	0	0
19	MF	(Japan) JPN	Koji Miyoshi	15	3	4+10	1	1	2	0	0
20	MF	(Belgium) BEL	Sander Coopman	13	0	3+7	0	2	0	0+1	0
25	MF	(Belgium) BEL	Alexis De Sart	31	1	20+3	1	2+2	0	3+1	0
38	MF	(Belgium) BEL	Faris Haroun	34	0	24+1	0	5	0	4	0
60	MF	(Mali) MLI	Sambou Yatabaré	0	0	0	0	0	0	0	0
Forwards
7	FW	(Cameroon) CMR	Didier Lamkel Zé	35	7	21+4	6	6	0	2+2	1
11	FW	(Israel) ISR	Lior Refaelov	29	13	21+3	11	3+2	2	0	0
14	FW	(Senegal) SEN	Amara Baby	16	1	3+6	0	1+3	1	0+3	0
28	FW	(Belgium) BEL	Manuel Benson	16	1	6+5	0	3+2	1	0	0
70	FW	(Democratic Republic of the Congo) COD	Dieumerci Mbokani	37	24	28	18	5	5	3+1	1
87	FW	(Belgium) BEL	Kevin Mirallas	21	2	11+7	2	2+1	0	0	0
93	FW	(Belgium) BEL	Zinho Gano	15	2	1+10	2	1+3	0	0	0
Players who have made an appearance this season but have left the club
9	FW	(Democratic Republic of the Congo) COD	Jonathan Bolingi	4	0	0+3	0	0	0	1	0
10	MF	(Belgium) BEL	Geoffry Hairemans	7	0	3+1	0	0	0	2+1	0
