= Covelo =

Covelo may refer to the following places:

in the United States:

- Covelo, California— a census-designated place in California, USA
  - Covelo AVA, California wine region in Mendocino County

in Portugal:

- Covelo (Gondomar)— a civic parish (freguesia) in the municipality of Gondomar, Portugal
- Covelo (Tábua)— a civic parish (freguesia) in the municipality of Tábua, Portugal
- Covelo do Gerês— a civic parish (freguesia) in the municipality of Montalegre, Portugal

in Spain:

- Covelo, Galicia— a municipality (concello) in the province of Pontevedra, Galicia, Spain.
- Covelo, medieval name for Cubelo de Sanabria
