= Ivo Rodrigues (footballer) =

Portuguese footballer

- Rodrigues with Motor Lublin in 2026

Personal information
- Full name: Ivo Tiago dos Santos Rodrigues
- Date of birth: 30 March 1995 (age 31)
- Place of birth: Baguim do Monte, Portugal
- Height: 1.82 m (6 ft 0 in)
- Positions: Winger; attacking midfielder

Team information
- Current team: Motor Lublin
- Number: 7

Youth career
- 2003–2005: Rio Tinto
- 2005–2013: Porto
- 2010–2011: → Padroense (loan)

Senior career*
Years	Team	Apps	(Gls)
2013–2015	Porto B	55	(14)
2015–2018	Porto	0	(0)
2015	→ Vitória Guimarães (loan)	3	(0)
2015–2016	→ Arouca (loan)	30	(3)
2016–2017	→ Paços Ferreira (loan)	26	(0)
2017–2018	→ Antwerp (loan)	26	(3)
2018–2020	Antwerp	50	(6)
2021–2023	Famalicão	68	(9)
2023–2024	Al-Khaleej	30	(1)
2024	Arouca	11	(0)
2025	Moreirense	13	(1)
2025–	Motor Lublin	31	(2)

International career
2011	Portugal U16	4	(1)
2011–2012	Portugal U17	9	(2)
2012–2013	Portugal U18	10	(1)
2013–2014	Portugal U19	15	(7)
2014–2015	Portugal U20	10	(4)
Medal record
Men's football
Representing Portugal
UEFA European Under-19 Championship
Runner-up	2014 Hungary
- * Club domestic league appearances and goals as of 11:14, 21 May 2026 (UTC)

Ivo Tiago dos Santos Rodrigues (born 30 March 1995) is a Portuguese professional footballer who plays as a winger or attacking midfielder for Ekstraklasa club Motor Lublin.

Developed at Porto where he made a single Taça da Liga appearance, he played in the Primeira Liga for Vitória de Guimarães, Arouca (twice), Paços de Ferreira, Famalicão and Moreirense. He also represented Antwerp, winning the Belgian Cup in 2020.

Rodrigues was a youth international for Portugal.

== Club career ==
=== Porto ===
Born in the village of Baguim do Monte in Gondomar, Rodrigues joined FC Porto in 2005 at the age of 10. He played the remainder of his formative years with the club, also being loaned to Padroense F.C. who acted as the under-16 squad.

Rodrigues made his professional debut with the reserves on 12 August 2013, coming on as a 60th-minute substitute for Mauro Caballero in a 3–2 away win against S.C. Beira-Mar in the Segunda Liga. At the beginning of the 2014–15 season, he won the confidence of coach Luís Castro and became a starter, scoring a hat-trick in the 7–0 home rout of S.C. Olhanense.

In January 2015, after netting 11 times for the B side, Rodrigues was called up by first-team manager Julen Lopetegui for a Taça da Liga match against C.F. União to be held on the 14th. He played the first half of an eventual 3–1 home victory, before leaving the pitch with an injury.

On 2 February 2015, Rodrigues was loaned to Vitória de Guimarães, appearing in his first competitive game against C.F. Belenenses in the League Cup and making his Primeira Liga bow against the same opponent, in two matches separated by four days. For the 2015–16 campaign he went on loan at another top-flight side, F.C. Arouca, making his debut on 16 August 2015 by featuring the full 90 minutes in a 2–0 defeat of Moreirense FC.

Rodrigues spent the next season at F.C. Paços de Ferreira of the same league, and on the same basis.

=== Antwerp ===
Rodrigues moved abroad for the same time on 29 June 2017 to Royal Antwerp F.C. of the Belgian Pro League, as the first player to transfer in a partnership between the two clubs. He scored three times in his loan season, including two on 27 August in his second match for a 4–3 win at K.V. Oostende, and in May 2018 he ended his 13-year association with Porto by signing a three-year deal with Belgium's oldest club.

On 8 August 2019, on his debut in UEFA competitions, Rodrigues scored the only goal as his team beat FC Viktoria Plzeň at home in the first leg of the Europa League's third qualifying round. Nearly a year later, he won the national cup, coming on in the last moments of a 1–0 final victory over Club Brugge KV.

=== Famalicão ===
Rodrigues returned to Portugal on 15 January 2021, joining F.C. Famalicão on a three-and-a-half-year contract. He opened his account on 21 March with two goals in a 4–0 win at C.S. Marítimo.

On 1 October 2021, after a 2–1 home loss to neighbours Vitória de Guimarães, Rodrigues pushed the fourth official and swore in English at the French referee. He was sent off, suspended for two games and fined €1,122.

=== Later career ===
On 14 June 2023, Rodrigues signed a two-year deal with Al-Khaleej FC in the Saudi Professional League, sharing teams with his compatriots Pedro Amaral, Pedro Emanuel (manager) and Fábio Martins. In August 2024, he returned to Arouca on a two-year contract; however, he finished the campaign with fellow top-tier Moreirense, having agreed to a one-year deal as a free agent.

Rodrigues went abroad again in summer 2025, on a one-year contract with the possibility of a one-year extension at Polish club Motor Lublin. He made his debut in the Ekstraklasa ten days later, featuring 15 minutes in the 1–0 win over Arka Gdynia.

== International career ==
Rodrigues represented Portugal at the 2015 FIFA U-20 World Cup, playing all five games – only one complete – in an eventual quarter-final exit in New Zealand and scoring in a 4–0 group stage win over Qatar.

== Career statistics ==
As of match played 16 May 2026

Appearances and goals by club, season and competition
Club	Season	League			National cup (Note: Includes Taça de Portugal, Belgian Cup, King Cup, Polish Cup)		League cup (Note: Includes Taça da Liga)		Continental		Total	
Club	Season	Division	Apps	Goals	Apps	Goals	Apps	Goals	Apps	Goals	Apps	Goals
Porto B	2013–14	Segunda Liga	33	2	—		—		—		33	2
Porto B	2014–15	Segunda Liga	22	12	—		—		—		22	12
Porto B	Total		55	14	—		—		—		55	14
Porto	2014–15	Primeira Liga	0	0	0	0	1	0	0	0	1	0
Vitória Guimarães (loan)	2014–15	Primeira Liga	3	0	0	0	1	0	—		4	0
Arouca (loan)	2015–16	Primeira Liga	30	3	4	2	0	0	—		34	5
Paços Ferreira (loan)	2016–17	Primeira Liga	26	0	2	1	2	0	—		30	1
Antwerp (loan)	2017–18	Belgian First Division A	26	3	1	0	—		—		27	3
Antwerp	2018–19	Belgian First Division A	28	2	1	0	—		—		29	2
Antwerp	2019–20	Belgian First Division A	22	4	3	0	—		4 (Note: Appearances in UEFA Europa League)	1	29	5
Antwerp	Total		76	9	5	0	—		4	1	85	10
Famalicão	2020–21	Primeira Liga	14	6	0	0	—		—		14	6
Famalicão	2021–22	Primeira Liga	24	1	2	0	4	2	—		30	3
Famalicão	2022–23	Primeira Liga	30	2	6	0	0	0	—		36	2
Famalicão	Total		68	9	8	0	4	2	—		80	11
Al-Khaleej	2023–24	Saudi Pro League	30	1	4	1	—		—		34	2
Arouca	2024–25	Primeira Liga	11	0	2	0	—		—		13	0
Moreirense	2024–25	Primeira Liga	13	1	—		—		—		13	1
Motor Lublin	2025–26	Ekstraklasa	31	2	1	0	—		—		32	2
Career total			343	39	26	4	8	2	4	1	381	46

== Honours ==
Royal Antwerp

- Belgian Cup: 2019–20

Portugal U19

- UEFA European Under-19 Championship runner-up: 2014
