= Melres e Medas =

- Civil parish
- Location in Portugal
- Coordinates: 41.072°N 8.402°W
- Country: Portugal
- Region: Norte
- Metropolitan area: Porto
- District: Porto
- Municipality: Gondomar

Area
  - Total: 27.81 km^{2} (10.74 sq mi)

Population (2011)
  - Total: 5,820
  - Density: 209/km^{2} (542/sq mi)
- Time zone: UTC+00:00 (WET)
  - Summer (DST): UTC+01:00 (WEST)

Melres e Medas is a civil parish in the municipality of Gondomar, Portugal. It was formed in 2013 by the merger of the former parishes Melres and Medas. The population in 2011 was 5,820, in an area of 27.81 km^{2} (10.74 sq mi).
