= Melres =

- Civil parish
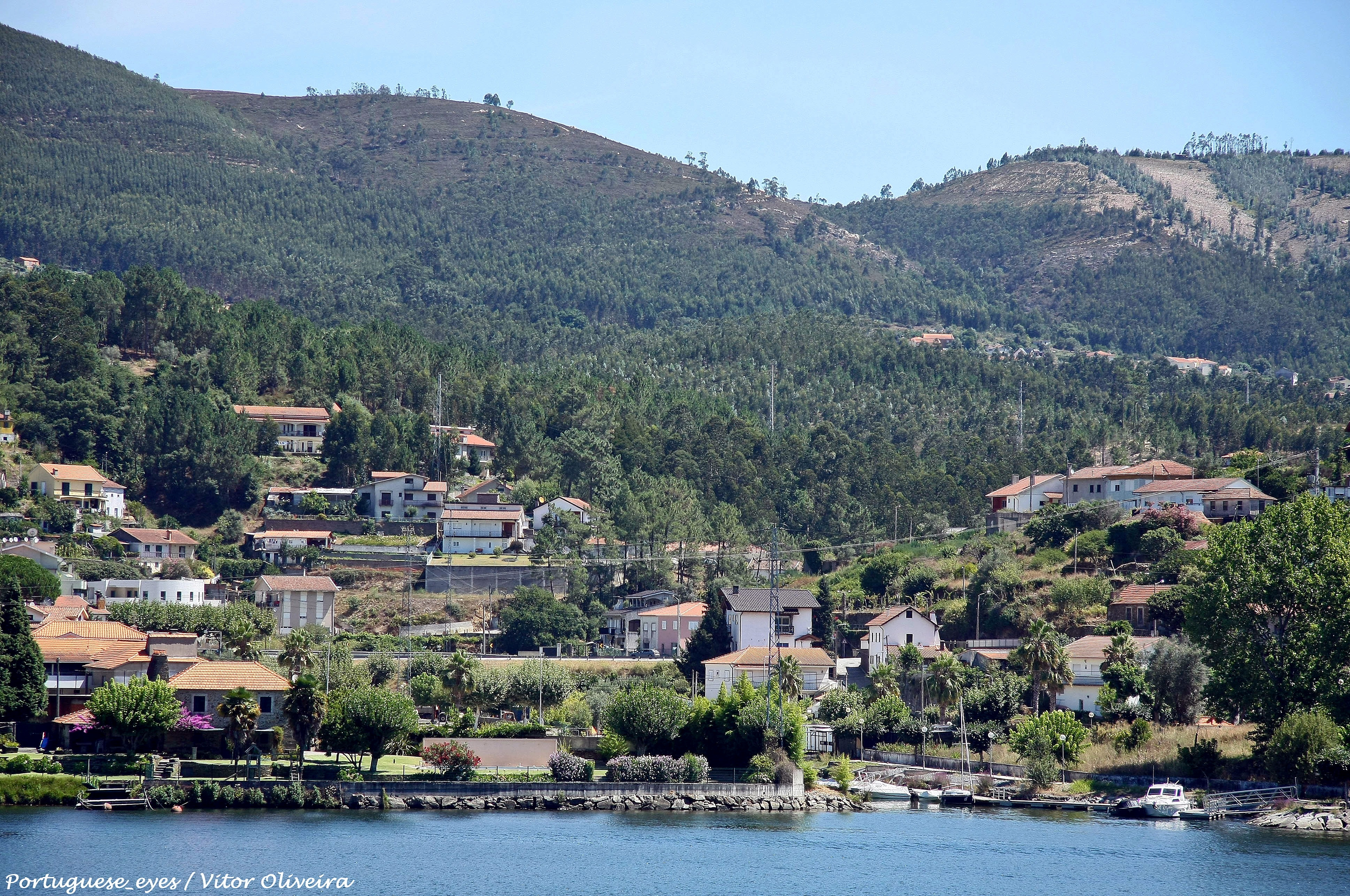
- Marina of Melres

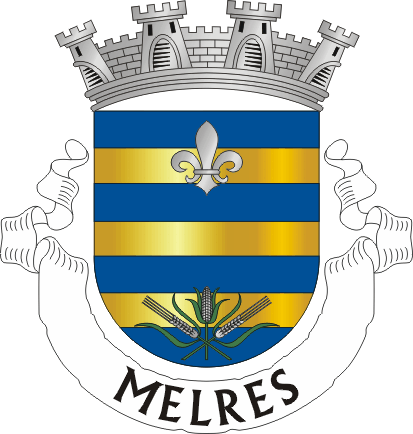
- Coat of arms

- Coordinates: 41°04′N 8°24′W
- Country: Portugal
- Region: Norte
- Metropolitan area: Porto
- District: Porto
- Municipality: Gondomar
- Disbanded: 2013

Area
  - Total: 15.40 km^{2} (5.95 sq mi)

Population (2011)
  - Total: 10,328
  - Density: 670.6/km^{2} (1,737/sq mi)
- Time zone: UTC+00:00 (WET)
  - Summer (DST): UTC+01:00 (WEST)
- Website: http://www.jf-melres.com

Melres is a town and a former civil parish in the municipality of Gondomar, Portugal. In 2013, the parish merged into the new parish Melres e Medas.
