= Foz do Sousa e Covelo =

- Civil parish
- Location in Portugal
- Coordinates: 41.09°N 8.49°W
- Country: Portugal
- Region: Norte
- Metropolitan area: Porto
- District: Porto
- Municipality: Gondomar

Area
  - Total: 30.24 km^{2} (11.68 sq mi)

Population (2011)
  - Total: 7,701
  - Density: 254.7/km^{2} (659.6/sq mi)
- Time zone: UTC+00:00 (WET)
  - Summer (DST): UTC+01:00 (WEST)

Foz do Sousa e Covelo is a civil parish in the municipality of Gondomar, Portugal. It was formed in 2013 by the merger of the former parishes Foz do Sousa and Covelo. The population in 2011 was 7,701, in an area of 30.24 km^{2} (11.68 sq mi).
