= Rómulo (footballer, born 1976) =

Portuguese footballer

Personal information
- Full name: Rómulo Filipe Cunha da Silva
- Date of birth: 13 July 1976 (age 50)
- Place of birth: Gondomar, Portugal
- Height: 1.83 m (6 ft 0 in)
- Position: Left-back

Youth career
- 1987–1994: Gondomar

Senior career*
Years	Team	Apps	(Gls)
1994–2010	Gondomar	350	(13)
2010–2015	Oliveira Douro	156	(10)
Total		506	(23)
- * Club domestic league appearances and goals

Rómulo Filipe Cunha da Silva (born 13 July 1976), known simply as Rómulo, is a Portuguese former footballer who played as a left-back.

== Club career ==
Rómulo was born in Gondomar, Porto District. He spent his entire professional career with local Gondomar S.C. as captain, making his first-team debut at the age of 17 and helping the club to promote from the regional leagues to the Segunda Liga, where he played for five consecutive seasons (2004–09).

In the 2008–09 campaign, the 32-year-old Rómulo still appeared in 19 league games for Gondomar, but his team finished last – they would have faced relegation anyway due to corruption – and returned to the third tier. In the summer of 2010, he joined amateurs C.F. Oliveira do Douro also in northern Portugal.
