= Covelo (Gondomar) =

- Civil parish
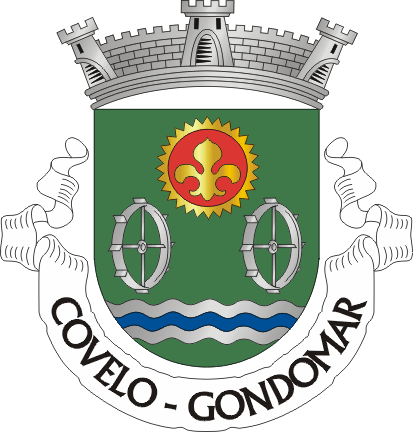
- Coat of arms

- Coordinates: 41°06′19″N 8°28′00″W
- Country: Portugal
- Region: Norte
- Metropolitan area: Porto
- District: Porto
- Municipality: Gondomar
- Disbanded: 2013

Area
  - Total: 8.36 km^{2} (3.23 sq mi)

Population (2001)
  - Total: 1,647
  - Density: 200/km^{2} (510/sq mi)
- Time zone: UTC+00:00 (WET)
  - Summer (DST): UTC+01:00 (WEST)

Covelo is a former civil parish in the municipality of Gondomar, Portugal. In 2013, the parish merged into the new parish Foz do Sousa e Covelo. It has a population of 1,755 inhabitants and a total area of 8.36 km^{2}.
