= André Silva (footballer, born 1995) =

Portuguese footballer (born 1995)

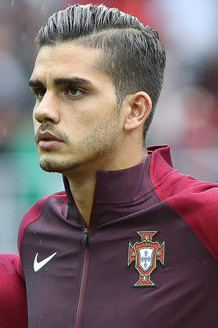
- Silva with Portugal at the 2017 Confederations Cup

Personal information
- Full name: André Miguel Valente da Silva
- Date of birth: 6 November 1995 (age 31)
- Place of birth: Baguim do Monte, Portugal
- Height: 1.85 m (6 ft 1 in)
- Position: Striker

Team information
- Current team: Porto
- Number: 19

Youth career
- 2003–2007: Salgueiros
- 2007–2008: Boavista
- 2008–2010: Salgueiros
- 2010–2011: Padroense
- 2011–2014: Porto

Senior career*
Years	Team	Apps	(Gls)
2013–2016	Porto B	84	(24)
2015–2017	Porto	41	(17)
2017–2020	AC Milan	25	(2)
2018–2019	→ Sevilla (loan)	27	(9)
2019–2020	→ Eintracht Frankfurt (loan)	25	(12)
2020–2021	Eintracht Frankfurt	32	(28)
2021–2025	RB Leipzig	72	(16)
2023–2024	→ Real Sociedad (loan)	19	(3)
2025	→ Werder Bremen (loan)	7	(1)
2025–2026	Elche	31	(10)
2026–	Porto	11	(4)

International career
2009–2010	Portugal U16	12	(2)
2010–2011	Portugal U17	11	(2)
2011–2012	Portugal U18	10	(0)
2012–2014	Portugal U19	24	(16)
2014–2015	Portugal U20	10	(8)
2015–2016	Portugal U21	3	(4)
2016–2022	Portugal	53	(19)
Medal record
Men's football
Representing Portugal
FIFA Confederations Cup
Third place	2017 Russia
UEFA Nations League
Winner	2019
UEFA European Under-19 Championship
Runner-up	2014 Hungary
- * Club domestic league appearances and goals as of 20:00, 8 November 2026 (UTC)

André Miguel Valente da Silva (European Portuguese: [ɐ̃ˈdɾɛ ˈsilvɐ]; born 6 November 1995) is a Portuguese professional footballer who plays as a striker for Primeira Liga club Porto.

An academy graduate of Porto, he impressed during his time with the reserve side before making his debut with the first team in 2015. He ultimately made 58 appearances for the club, scoring 24 goals before joining AC Milan in 2017. He went on to represent Sevilla and Eintracht Frankfurt on loan, signing a permanent contract with the latter in 2020. Following a club record-breaking campaign, in which he scored 28 times, he moved to RB Leipzig also in the Bundesliga for a reported fee of €23 million.

Silva represented Portugal at various youth levels, and was part of the squad which came second at the 2014 European Under-19 Championship. His senior international debut followed two years later, and he featured at the 2017 Confederations Cup where his team came third, also being selected for two World Cups and Euro 2020.

== Club career ==
=== Porto ===
==== Reserves ====
Silva was born in Baguim do Monte, a local parish in Gondomar, and started playing football with Porto-based Salgueiros after switching from swimming. He had a brief spell with neighbouring Boavista, but quickly returned to his previous club.

Silva finished his youth career with Porto, having signed with the juniors in 2011 at the age of 15. On 12 August 2013, he made his professional debut, coming on as a 77th-minute substitute for Tozé as the B team won 3–2 away against Beira-Mar in the Segunda Liga.

Silva finished his second season with 34 games and seven goals, helping Porto B to the 13th position in the second tier. Highlights included a brace on 4 January 2015, for a 3–0 home victory over Vitória de Guimarães B.

==== First team ====
Silva made his competitive debut for the first team on 29 December 2015, playing the full 90 minutes in a 1–3 home loss against Marítimo in the Taça da Liga. His maiden appearance in the Primeira Liga occurred four days later, as he replaced Vincent Aboubakar for the last 20 minutes of the 2–0 defeat at Sporting CP.

Silva started the 2015–16 campaign as fourth-choice striker behind Aboubakar and Dani Osvaldo, and his plight worsened in January 2016 with the acquisition of Suk Hyun-jun and Moussa Marega. However, after José Peseiro replaced Julen Lopetegui as manager, he received more opportunities, and scored his first league goal in a 4–0 home win over Boavista in the last match. He also started in the final of the Taça de Portugal on 22 May, helping his team recover from a 2–0 deficit against Braga with a brace, which included a bicycle kick in the last-minute (eventual 4–2 loss on penalties).

Silva began 2016–17 in good form, with goals in his first two league games against Rio Ave and Estoril, while also scoring in Porto's 1–1 draw at home to Roma in the UEFA Champions League play-off round. On 21 August 2016 he signed a new five-year contract, which included a release clause of €60 million.

=== Milan ===
On 12 June 2017, Silva moved to AC Milan on a five-year contract for a fee of €38 million with the additional €2 million depending on objectives. Upon signing, he told the press: "I'm very happy to have joined such a prestigious club with such a great history." He was given the number 9 shirt, previously worn by Gianluca Lapadula.

Silva made his debut for the Italian club on 27 July, playing 24 minutes in the 1–0 win against Universitatea Craiova in the third qualifying round of the UEFA Europa League. On 17 August, for the same competition but in the play-off round, he contributed two goals and one assist to a 6–0 home rout of Shkëndija. On 14 September, already in the group stage, he scored a hat-trick to help the visitors defeat Austria Wien 5–1; in the process, he became the first player to achieve the feat for Milan in Europe since Kaká in 2006, and he was included in UEFA's Europa League Team of the Week due to his performance. He scored his maiden goal in the Serie A on 11 March 2018, from a last-minute header in the 1–0 away win over Genoa.

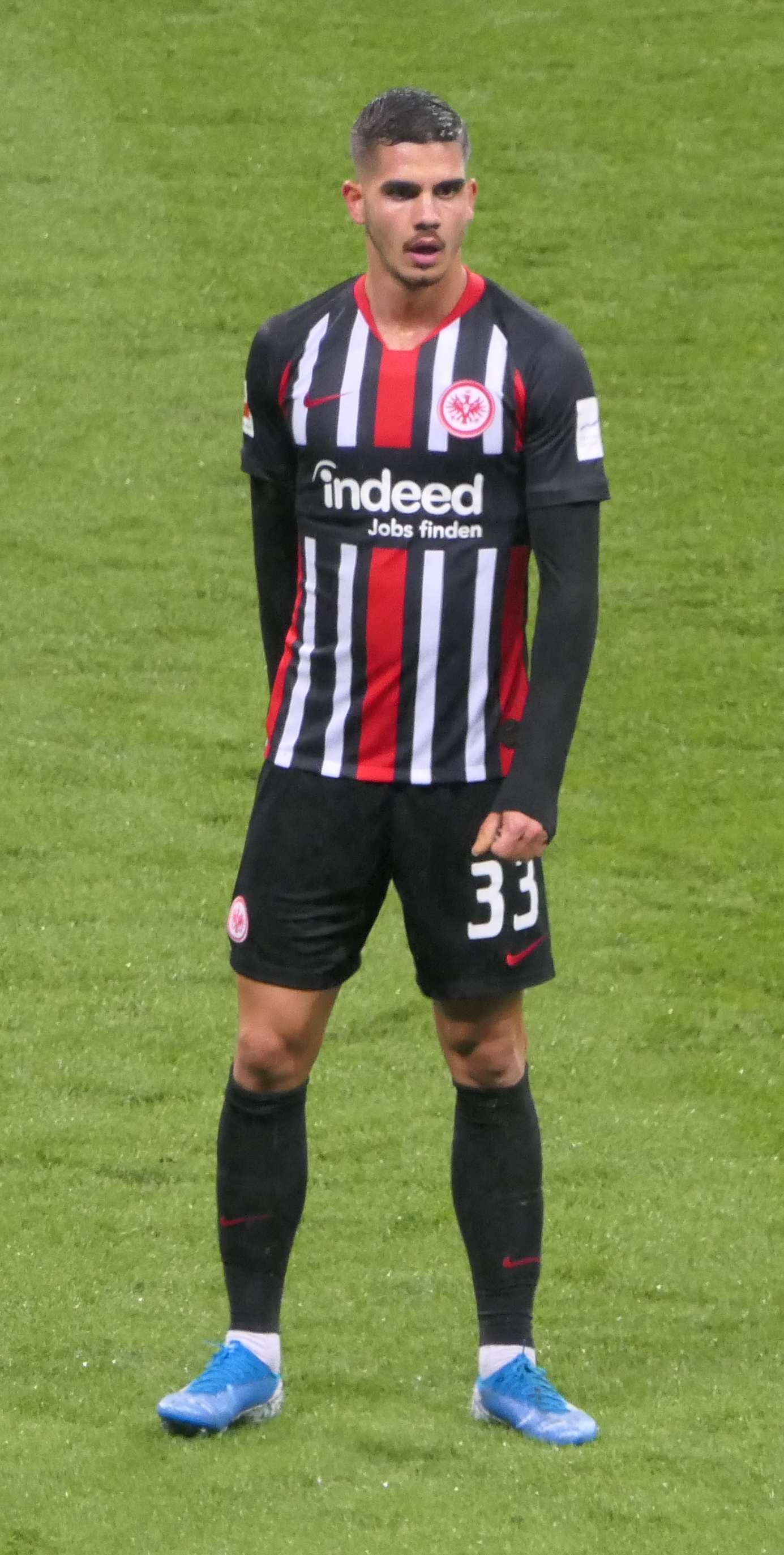
Silva with Eintracht in 2019

On 11 August 2018, Silva joined Spanish club Sevilla on a season-long loan with the option to purchase for €35 million. He made his debut the following day, coming on for Luis Muriel at the hour mark of an eventual 2–1 loss against Barcelona in the Supercopa de España. He scored a hat-trick in his first La Liga match on 19 August in a 4–1 victory at Rayo Vallecano, equalling the feat of Romário who achieved this in 1993, and also scored a brace in a 3–0 home defeat of Real Madrid on 26 September.

On 25 November 2018, Silva scored the only goal in a win over Real Valladolid as Sevilla temporarily led the table. His performances declined over the course of the campaign, leading the Andalusians to not sign him on a permanent basis.

=== Eintracht Frankfurt ===
On 2 September 2019, Silva moved to Eintracht Frankfurt on a two-year loan deal, with Ante Rebić heading in the opposite direction. He made his Bundesliga debut 12 days later, playing the entire 2–1 defeat at Augsburg and partnering compatriot and former Porto teammate Gonçalo Paciência up front. He scored his first goal in the competition on 22 September, netting the first in a 2–2 home draw against Borussia Dortmund.

With the restart of the German league following the COVID-19 pandemic, Silva scored eight goals in ten games for a total of 12 in the campaign. This surpassed by one goal the record for top-scoring Portuguese in a German top-flight season, by Werder Bremen's Hugo Almeida.

On 10 September 2020, Silva signed a permanent three-year contract. He was Player of the Month for the following January, with seven goals from six games including three braces. With 28 goals, he bettered Bernd Hölzenbein's 44-year-old club record for goals in a top-flight campaign by one; only Bayern Munich's Robert Lewandowski scored more over the season.

=== RB Leipzig ===
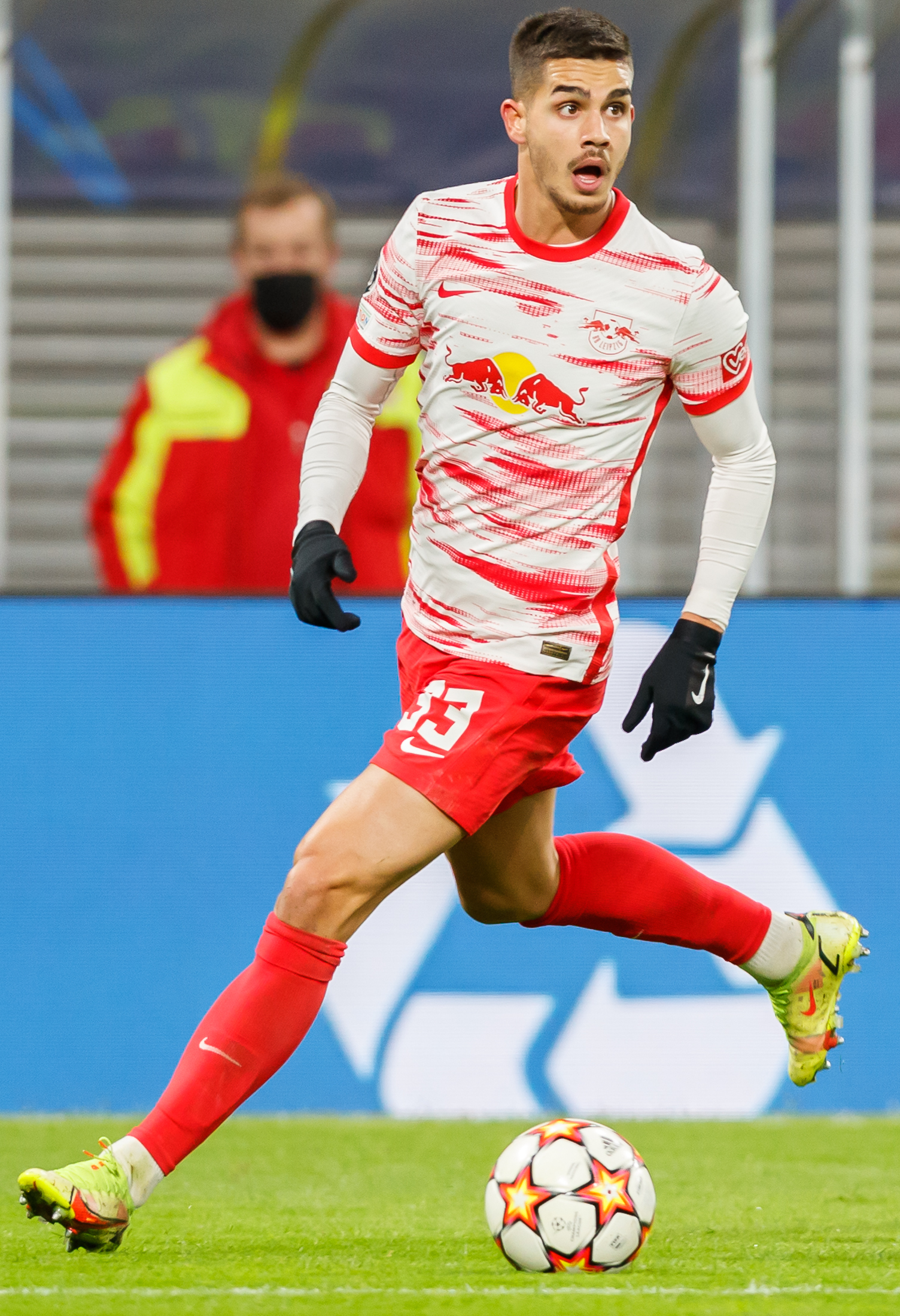
Silva playing for RB Leipzig in 2021

Silva joined RB Leipzig on 2 July 2021, on a five-year contract for a fee of €23 million. On 20 August, he scored his first goal in a 4–0 win over VfB Stuttgart. His first in the Champions League came on 19 October, in a 3–2 away loss against Paris Saint-Germain in the group stage. He added two in six appearances in their victorious run in the DFB-Pokal.

On 2 August 2023, Silva moved to Spanish top-tier club Real Sociedad on a season-long loan with an option to buy. He made his debut on 30 September, as a 60th-minute substitute in the 3–0 home win over Athletic Bilbao.

On 3 February 2025, Silva was loaned to Werder Bremen until the end of the campaign.

=== Elche ===
Silva returned to the Spanish top division on 18 August 2025, on a one-year deal at Elche with the option of an additional year's extension. Having been known as André Silva for most of his career, he opted to the preposition da before his paternal family name in order to differentiate himself from his recently deceased namesake. In spite of limited playing time, he led all players in his team at ten in an escape from relegation.

=== Return to Porto ===
On 12 June 2026, aged 30, Silva rejoined Porto nine years after leaving; he signed an initial one-year contract.

== International career ==
=== Youth ===
Silva represented Portugal at every youth level. He participated with the under-20 team at the 2015 FIFA World Cup, scoring four goals in the group stage as the nation reached the quarter-finals. Previously, at the 2014 UEFA European Under-19 Championship, he became the first player ever to net four times in a single match (6–1 group stage defeat of Hungary), in an eventual runner-up finish for the under-19s.

On 8 September 2015, in his first appearance with the under-21 side, Silva scored a hat-trick in 19 minutes (both halves combined), contributing to a 6–1 win against Albania for the 2017 European Under-21 Championship qualifiers.

=== Senior ===
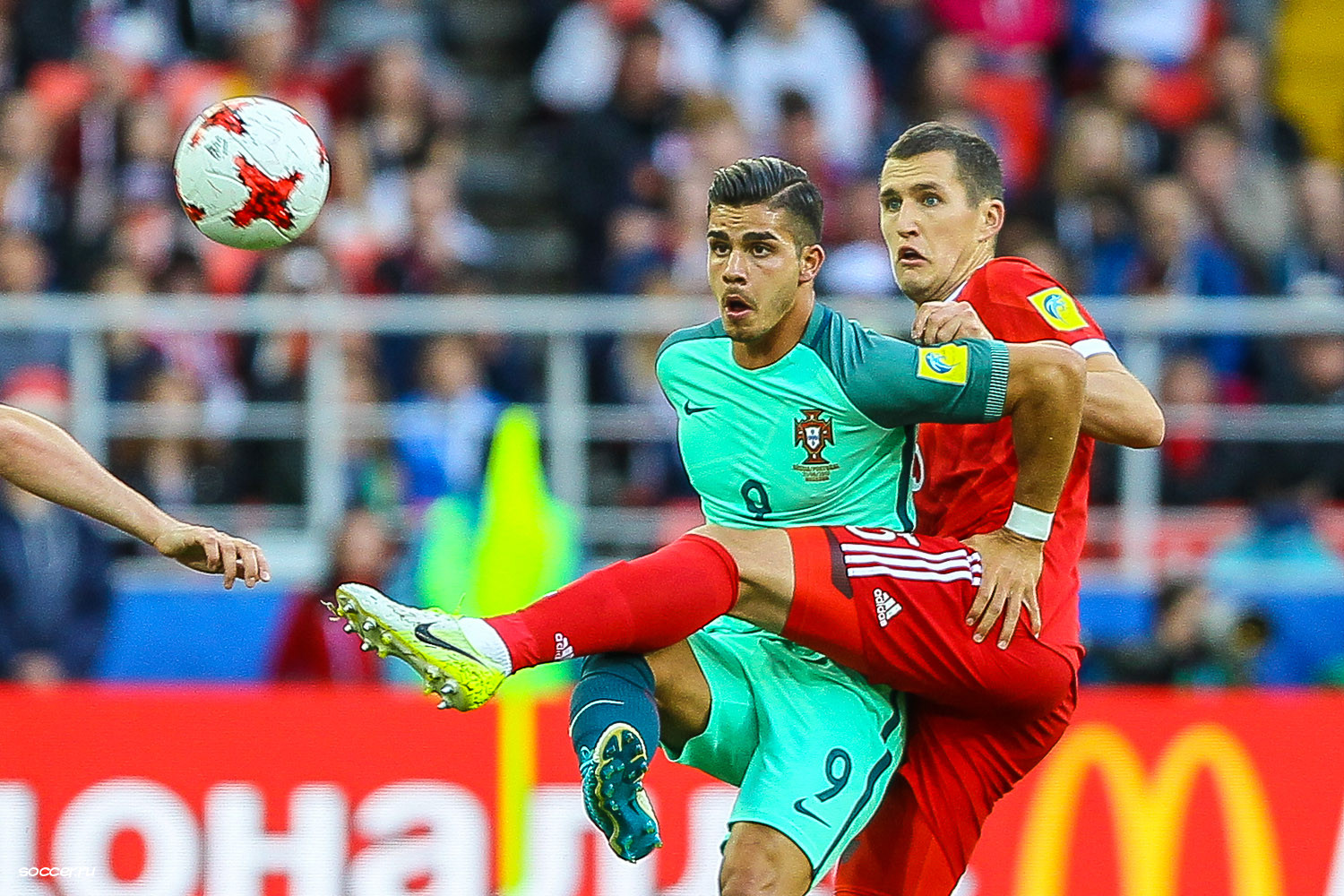
Silva (left) and Russia's Viktor Vasin at the 2017 Confederations Cup

Silva was called up for the first time to the senior team by head coach Fernando Santos on 26 August 2016, playing the second half of a 5–0 friendly victory over Gibraltar in Porto on 1 September. He scored his first goal with Portugal's main squad on 7 October, featuring the entire 6–0 defeat of Andorra for the 2018 FIFA World Cup qualifiers. Three days later, for the same competition, he netted three times in the first half of an eventual 6–0 thrashing of the Faroe Islands.

Silva was selected for the 2017 FIFA Confederations Cup, making his tournament debut when he replaced Ricardo Quaresma for the last eight minutes of the 2–2 group stage draw with Mexico. He scored his first goal in the competition on 24 June, playing the full 90 minutes in the 4–0 win against New Zealand. In the third-place play-off, in which his team eventually defeated Mexico 2–1 after extra time, he had his early penalty saved by Guillermo Ochoa.

In May 2018, Silva was named in Portugal's final squad for the FIFA World Cup, also to be held in Russia. Late into that month, he scored the 1000th goal in the national team's history during the first half of a friendly with Tunisia in Braga. He made his debut in the competition on 15 June, replacing Gonçalo Guedes in the 80th minute of the 3–3 group stage draw against Spain.

Silva was selected for the delayed UEFA Euro 2020 tournament on 20 May 2021, replacing Diogo Jota in the 70th minute of a 1–0 loss to Belgium in the round of 16. In November 2022, he made the final squad for the World Cup in Qatar. His only appearance in an eventual quarter-final exit consisted of 30 minutes of the 2–1 defeat against South Korea in the group stage.

== Career statistics ==
=== Club ===
As of match played 20 November 2026

Appearances and goals by club, season and competition
Club	Season	League			National cup (Note: Includes Taça de Portugal, Coppa Italia, Copa del Rey, DFB-Pokal)		League cup (Note: Includes Taça da Liga)		Europe		Other		Total	
Club	Season	Division	Apps	Goals	Apps	Goals	Apps	Goals	Apps	Goals	Apps	Goals	Apps	Goals
Porto B	2013–14	Segunda Liga	21	3	—		—		—		—		21	3
Porto B	2014–15	Segunda Liga	34	7	—		—		—		—		34	7
Porto B	2015–16	Segunda Liga	29	14	—		—		—		—		29	14
Porto B	Total		84	24	—		—		—		—		84	24
Porto	2015–16	Primeira Liga	9	1	2	2	3	0	0	0	—		14	3
Porto	2016–17	Primeira Liga	32	16	2	0	0	0	10 (Note: Appearances in UEFA Champions League)	5	—		44	21
Porto	Total		41	17	4	2	3	0	10	5	—		58	24
AC Milan	2017–18	Serie A	24	2	2	0	—		14 (Note: Appearances in UEFA Europa League)	8	—		40	10
AC Milan	2019–20	Serie A	1	0	0	0	—		—		—		1	0
AC Milan	Total		25	2	2	0	—		14	8	—		41	10
Sevilla (loan)	2018–19	La Liga	27	9	4	2	—		8	0	1 (Note: Appearance in Supercopa de España)	0	40	11
Eintracht Frankfurt (loan)	2019–20	Bundesliga	25	12	3	2	—		9	2	—		37	16
Eintracht Frankfurt	2020–21	Bundesliga	32	28	2	1	—		—		—		34	29
RB Leipzig	2021–22	Bundesliga	33	11	6	2	—		12 (Note: Six appearances and three goals in UEFA Champions League, six appearances and one goal in UEFA Europa League)	4	—		51	17
RB Leipzig	2022–23	Bundesliga	31	4	4	2	—		8	3	1 (Note: Appearance in DFL-Supercup)	0	44	9
RB Leipzig	2024–25	Bundesliga	8	1	3	0	—		4	0	—		15	1
RB Leipzig	Total		72	16	13	4	—		24	7	1	0	110	27
Real Sociedad (loan)	2023–24	La Liga	19	3	5	1	—		3	0	—		27	4
Werder Bremen (loan)	2024–25	Bundesliga	7	1	1	0	—		—		—		8	1
Elche	2025–26	La Liga	31	10	1	0	—		—		—		32	10
Porto	2026–27	Primeira Liga	11	4	1	0	0	0	4	0	1 (Note: Appearance in Supertaça Cândido de Oliveira)	0	17	4
Career total			374	126	36	12	3	0	72	22	3	0	488	160

=== International ===
Appearances and goals by national team and year
National team	Year	Apps	Goals
Portugal	2016	5	4
Portugal	2017	13	7
Portugal	2018	13	4
Portugal	2019	3	0
Portugal	2020	3	1
Portugal	2021	12	3
Portugal	2022	4	0
Total		53	19

Scores and results list Portugal's goal tally first, score column indicates score after each Silva goal.

List of international goals scored by André Silva
No.	Date	Venue	Opponent	Score	Result	Competition
1	7 October 2016	Estádio Municipal, Aveiro, Portugal	Andorra	6–0	6–0	2018 FIFA World Cup qualification
2	10 October 2016	Tórsvøllur, Tórshavn, Faroe Islands	Faroe Islands	1–0	6–0	2018 FIFA World Cup qualification
3	10 October 2016	Tórsvøllur, Tórshavn, Faroe Islands	Faroe Islands	2–0	6–0	2018 FIFA World Cup qualification
4	10 October 2016	Tórsvøllur, Tórshavn, Faroe Islands	Faroe Islands	3–0	6–0	2018 FIFA World Cup qualification
5	25 March 2017	Estádio da Luz, Lisbon, Portugal	Hungary	1–0	3–0	2018 FIFA World Cup qualification
6	3 June 2017	António Coimbra da Mota, Estoril, Portugal	Cyprus	4–0	4–0	Friendly
7	9 June 2017	Skonto Stadium, Riga, Latvia	Latvia	3–0	3–0	2018 FIFA World Cup qualification
8	24 June 2017	Krestovsky Stadium, Saint Petersburg, Russia	New Zealand	3–0	4–0	2017 FIFA Confederations Cup
9	3 September 2017	Groupama Arena, Budapest, Hungary	Hungary	1–0	1–0	2018 FIFA World Cup qualification
10	7 October 2017	Estadi Nacional, Andorra la Vella, Andorra	Andorra	2–0	2–0	2018 FIFA World Cup qualification
11	10 October 2017	Estádio da Luz, Lisbon, Portugal	Switzerland	2–0	2–0	2018 FIFA World Cup qualification
12	28 May 2018	Estádio Municipal, Braga, Portugal	Tunisia	1–0	2–2	Friendly
13	10 September 2018	Estádio da Luz, Lisbon, Portugal	Italy	1–0	1–0	2018–19 UEFA Nations League A
14	11 October 2018	Silesian Stadium, Chorzów, Poland	Poland	1–1	3–2	2018–19 UEFA Nations League A
15	20 November 2018	D. Afonso Henriques, Guimarães, Portugal	Poland	1–0	1–1	2018–19 UEFA Nations League A
16	5 September 2020	Estádio do Dragão, Porto, Portugal	Croatia	4–1	4–1	2020–21 UEFA Nations League A
17	4 September 2021	Nagyerdei Stadion, Debrecen, Hungary	Qatar	1–0	3–1	Friendly
18	7 September 2021	Olympic Stadium, Baku, Azerbaijan	Azerbaijan	2–0	3–0	2022 FIFA World Cup qualification
19	9 October 2021	Estádio Algarve, Faro, Portugal	Qatar	3–0	3–0	Friendly

== Honours ==
Porto B

- LigaPro: 2015–16

RB Leipzig

- DFB-Pokal: 2021–22, 2022–23

Porto

- Supertaça Cândido de Oliveira: 2026

Portugal

- UEFA Nations League: 2018–19
- FIFA Confederations Cup third place: 2017

Individual

- SJPF Segunda Liga Player of the Month: August/September 2015, December 2015
- Segunda Liga Player of the Year: 2015–16
- Segunda Liga Breakthrough Player of the Year: 2015–16
- UEFA Champions League Breakthrough XI: 2016
- Bundesliga Goal of the Month: June 2020
- Bundesliga Player of the Month: January 2021
- Bundesliga Team of the Season: 2020–21
- Kicker Bundesliga Team of the Season: 2020–21
