= Jean-François De Sart =

Belgian footballer and coach

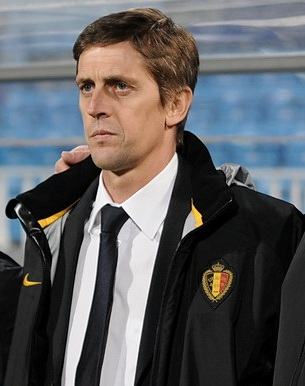

Personal information
- Full name: Jean-François De Sart
- Date of birth: 18 December 1961 (age 64)
- Place of birth: Waremme, Belgium
- Position: Defender

Senior career*
Years	Team	Apps	(Gls)
1979–1991	R.F.C. de Liège		
1991–1993	R.S.C. Anderlecht		
1993–1995	R.F.C. de Liège		

International career
1989	Belgium	3	(0)

Managerial career
- 1999–2011: Belgium U21
- 2011–2014: Standard Liège (technical director)
- * Club domestic league appearances and goals

Jean-François De Sart (born 18 December 1961 at Waremme) is a former Belgian football player. He is the former coach of the Belgium national under-21 football team and has last worked as Director of football for Standard Liège. While at R.F.C. de Liège he helped them win the 1989–90 Belgian Cup, and he also won the 1992–93 Belgian First Division title while at Anderlecht.

He also works part-time as a football pundit on Belgian television.

He is the father of Julien De Sart and Alexis De Sart, both represented Standard Liège at Youth and Senior level, with Julien playing in the English Championship for Middlesbrough until 2018.

== Playing career ==
- 1979–1991: R.F.C. de Liège
- 1991–1993: R.S.C. Anderlecht
- 1993–1995: R.F.C. de Liège

He earned 3 caps for the Belgium national football team
