= Rio Tinto (Gondomar) =

- Civil parish
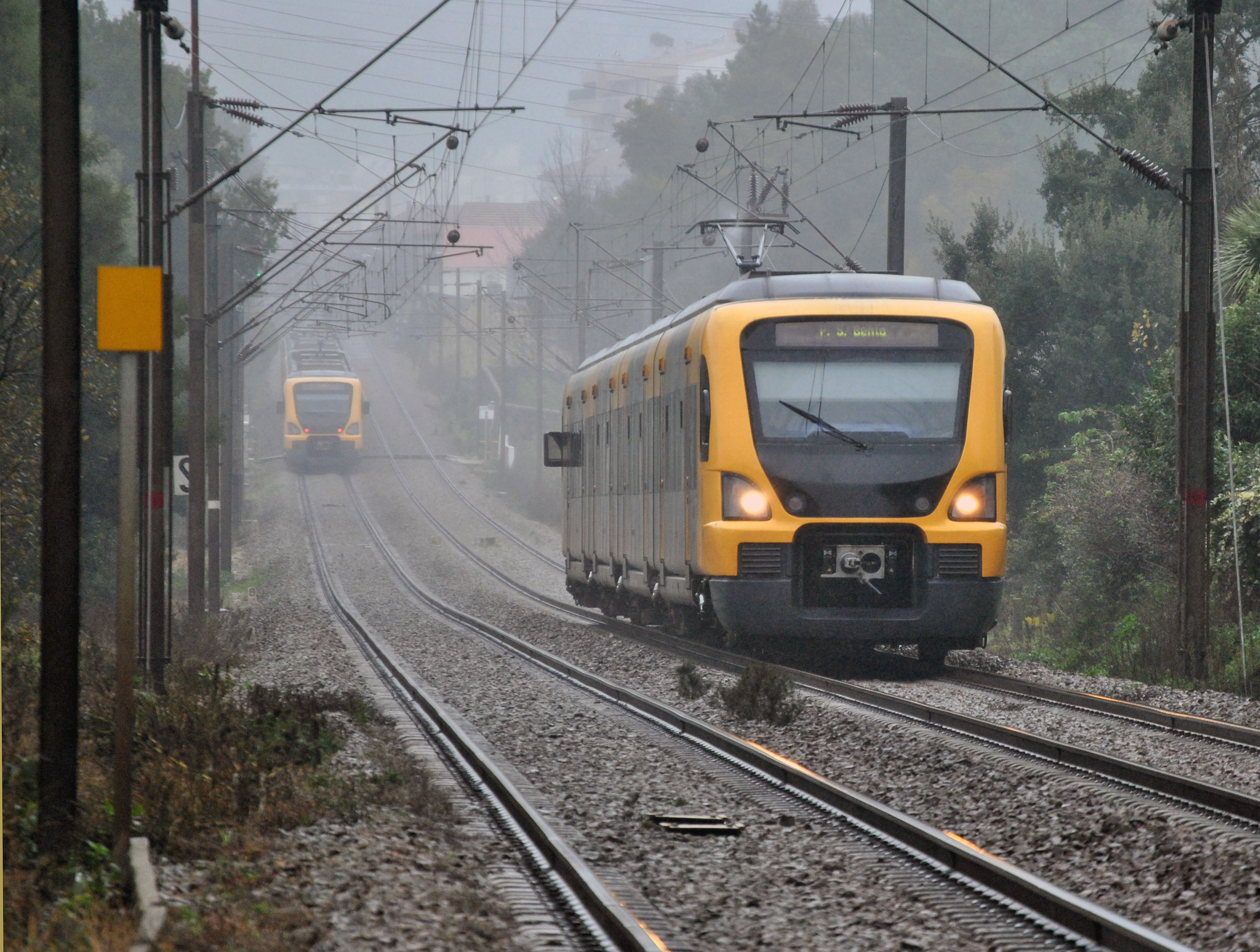
- Train in Rio Tinto, Portugal

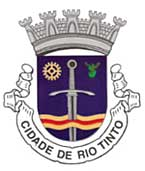
- Coat of arms

- Location in Portugal
- Coordinates: 41.178°N 8.560°W
- Country: Portugal
- Region: Norte
- Metropolitan area: Porto
- District: Porto
- Municipality: Gondomar

Area
  - Total: 9.38 km^{2} (3.62 sq mi)

Population (2011)
  - Total: 50,713
  - Density: 5,410/km^{2} (14,000/sq mi)
- Time zone: UTC+00:00 (WET)
  - Summer (DST): UTC+01:00 (WEST)
- Postal code: 4435
- Website: www.jf-riotinto.pt

Rio Tinto (European Portuguese pronunciation: [ˈʁi.u ˈtĩtu]; "Colored River") is a Portuguese city and parish located in Gondomar Municipality, in northern Portugal. The population in 2011 was 50,713, in an area of 9.38 km^{2}. Rio Tinto, which in Portuguese means red river, was elevated to city status in 1995, and the city of Rio Tinto includes two parishes (freguesias): Baguim do Monte and Rio Tinto, with a total of 65,000 inhabitants, being the most populous city in Gondomar municipality, and third largest in the Greater Porto agglomeration.

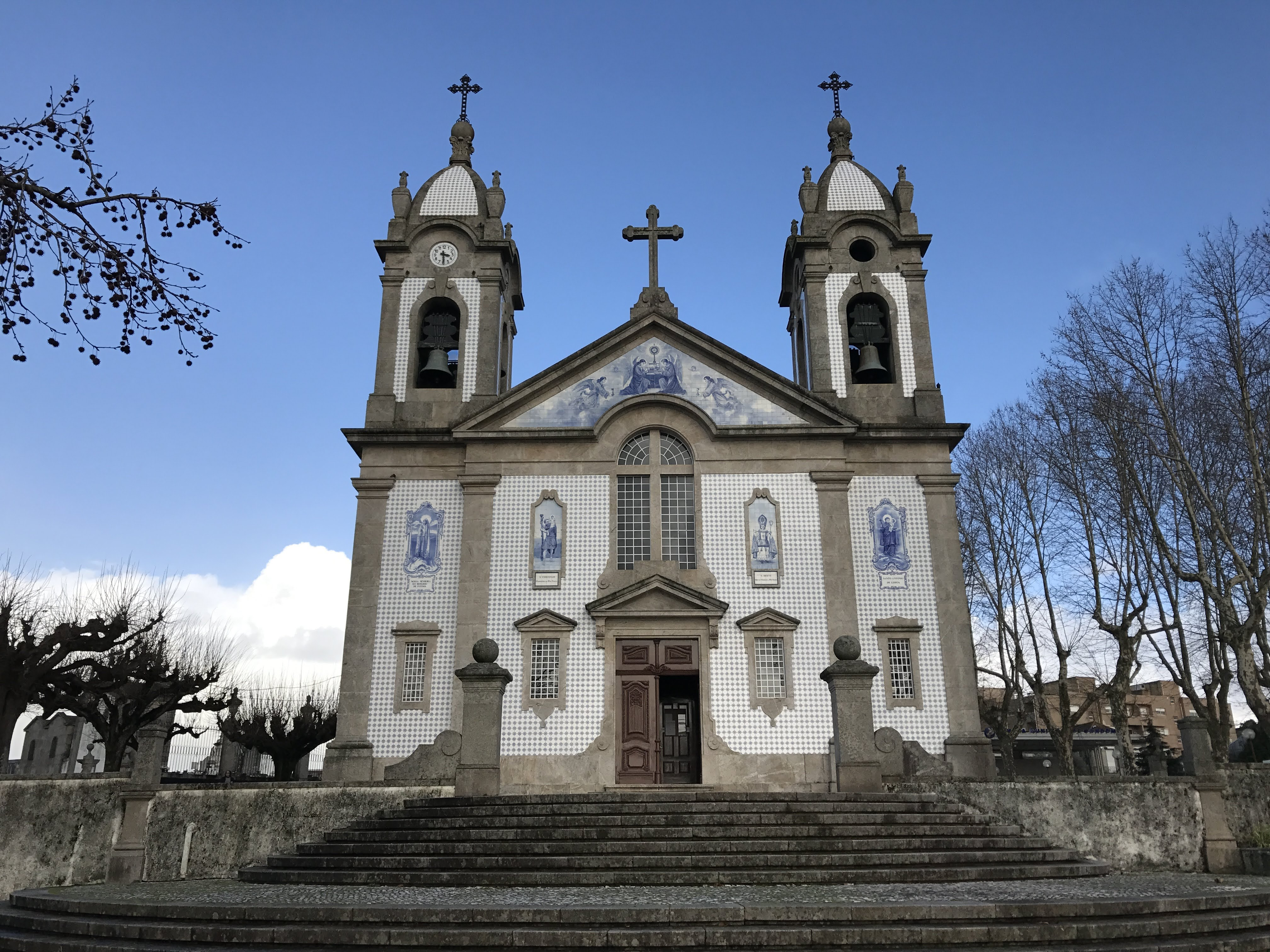
Church of Rio Tinto

Rio Tinto lies just outside the city of Porto.
