= Baguim do Monte =

Coordinates: 41.19200°N 8.54100°E

- Civil parish
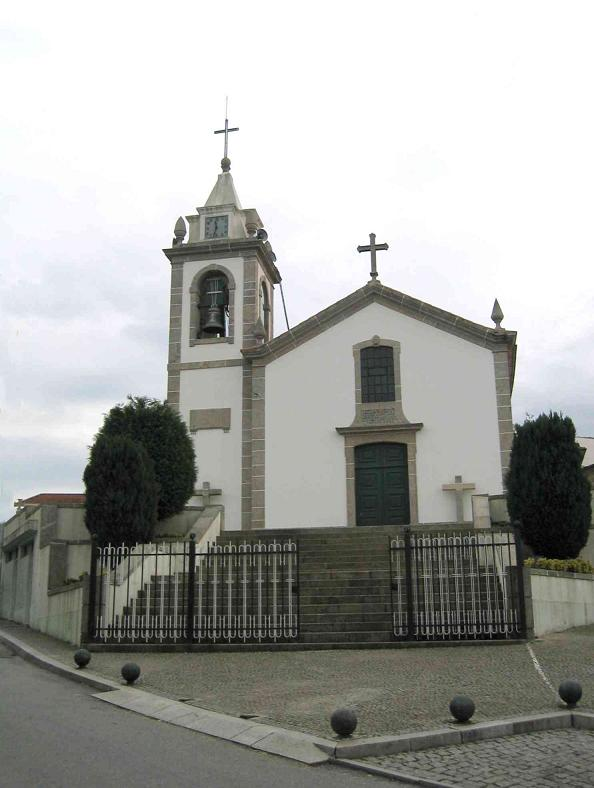
- Interactive map of Baguim do Monte
- Country: Portugal
- Region: Norte
- Metropolitan area: Porto
- District: Porto
- Municipality: Gondomar

Area
  - Total: 5.46 km^{2} (2.11 sq mi)

Population (2011)
  - Total: 14,102
  - Density: 2,580/km^{2} (6,690/sq mi)
- Time zone: UTC+00:00 (WET)
  - Summer (DST): UTC+01:00 (WEST)

Baguim do Monte is a civil parish in the municipality of Gondomar, Portugal. It was formed on July 11, 1985, by disintegration of territories of the parish of Rio Tinto. The population in 2011 was 14,102, in an area of 5.46 km^{2} (2.11 sq mi). Together with the neighboring parish of Rio Tinto, it integrates the city of Rio Tinto.

== Notable people ==
- André Silva (b.1995), a footballer who plays for the Portugal national football team and Portuguese club FC Porto.
- Ivo Rodrigues (b.1995), a footballer who plays for Polish club Motor Lublin.
