= Yves De Winter =

Belgian footballer

Personal information
- Date of birth: 25 May 1987 (age 39)
- Place of birth: Lier, Belgium
- Height: 1.88 m (6 ft 2 in)
- Position: Goalkeeper

Youth career
- 2001–2006: Westerlo

Senior career*
Years	Team	Apps	(Gls)
2006–2011	Westerlo	125	(0)
2011–2012	De Graafschap	28	(0)
2012–2015	AZ	0	(0)
2015–2016	Sint-Truiden	4	(0)
2016–2017	Roda JC	0	(0)
2017–2018	Roeselare	0	(0)
2018–2020	Antwerp	0	(0)

International career
2006–2007	Belgium U21	1	(0)
2007–2008	Belgium U23	1	(0)
- * Club domestic league appearances and goals

Yves De Winter (born 25 May 1987) is a Belgian former professional footballer who played as a goalkeeper.

== Club career ==
After having played for Westerlo, De Winter moved to the Netherlands in August 2011 where he signed for De Graafschap. After one season, he moved to AZ to become the backup behind Esteban Alvarado. He remained at the club for three years before returning to Belgium, signing with Sint-Truiden in 2015. In July 2017, he signed with Roda JC Kerkrade on a one-year deal. He later played for Roeselare and Antwerp, before retiring from football in April 2021, after having been a free agent for a year.

== Honours ==
AZ

- KNVB Cup: 2012–13
