= Matheus (footballer, born January 1992) =

Brazilian footballer

Personal information
- Full name: Matheus Borges Domingues
- Date of birth: 22 January 1992 (age 34)
- Place of birth: Americana, Brazil
- Height: 1.92 m (6 ft 3 1/2 in)
- Positions: Centre back; left back

Youth career
- Londrina

Senior career*
Years	Team	Apps	(Gls)
2015–2018	Londrina	50	(1)
2017–2018	→ Antwerp (loan)	32	(3)
2018–2021	Antwerp	14	(0)
- * Club domestic league appearances and goals as of 20 October 2019

Matheus Borges Domingues (born 22 January 1992) is a Brazilian professional footballer who plays as a centre back or left back.

== Club career ==
Matheus started his career with Londrina EC.
