= Alexis De Sart =

Belgian footballer

Personal information
- Date of birth: 12 November 1996 (age 30)
- Place of birth: Waremme, Belgium
- Height: 1.80 m (5 ft 11 in)
- Position: Midfielder

Team information
- Current team: Mons

Youth career
- 2003–2006: Stade Waremmien
- 2006–2015: Standard Liège

Senior career*
Years	Team	Apps	(Gls)
2015	Standard Liège	0	(0)
2016–2019	Sint-Truiden	92	(11)
2019–2023	Antwerp	33	(1)
2021–2022	→ OH Leuven (loan)	21	(2)
2022–2023	→ RWDM (loan)	27	(1)
2023–2025	RWDM	18	(0)
2025–2026	RFC Liège	22	(4)
2026–	Mons	0	(0)

International career
2014	Belgium U18	5	(0)
2014–2015	Belgium U19	9	(0)
2017–2019	Belgium U21	13	(1)
- * Club domestic league appearances and goals as of 19 April 2026

Alexis De Sart (born 12 November 1996) is a Belgian footballer who plays as a midfielder for Belgian National Division 1 club Mons. He is the brother of Julien De Sart and the son of Jean-François De Sart.

== Club career ==
De Sart is a product of the academy of Standard Liège. On 30 July 2015, he made his professional debut with Standard Liège against FK Željezničar Sarajevo in a UEFA Europa League qualifier.
