= Gondomar, Portugal =

Gondomar
- Municipality
- City of Gondomar
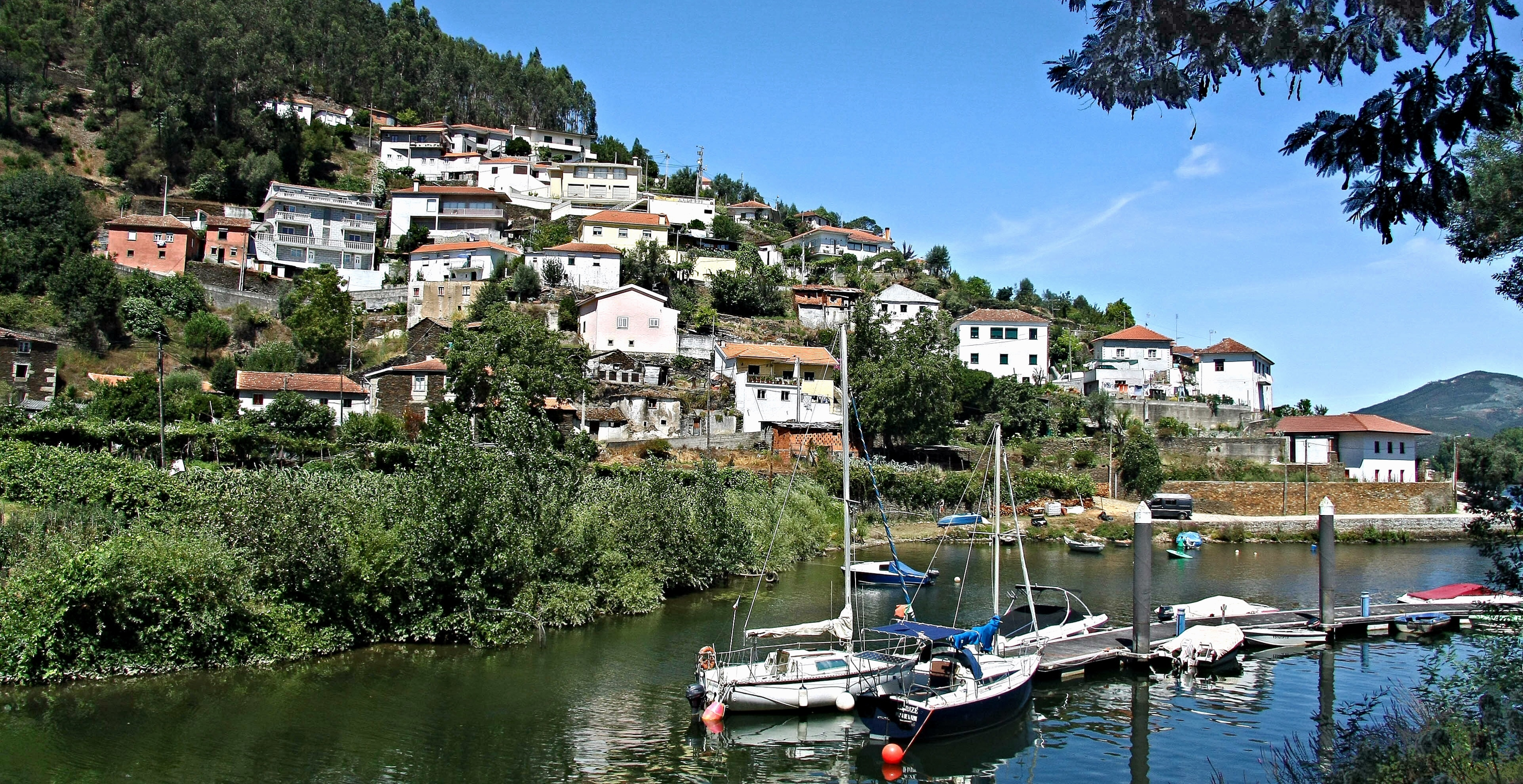
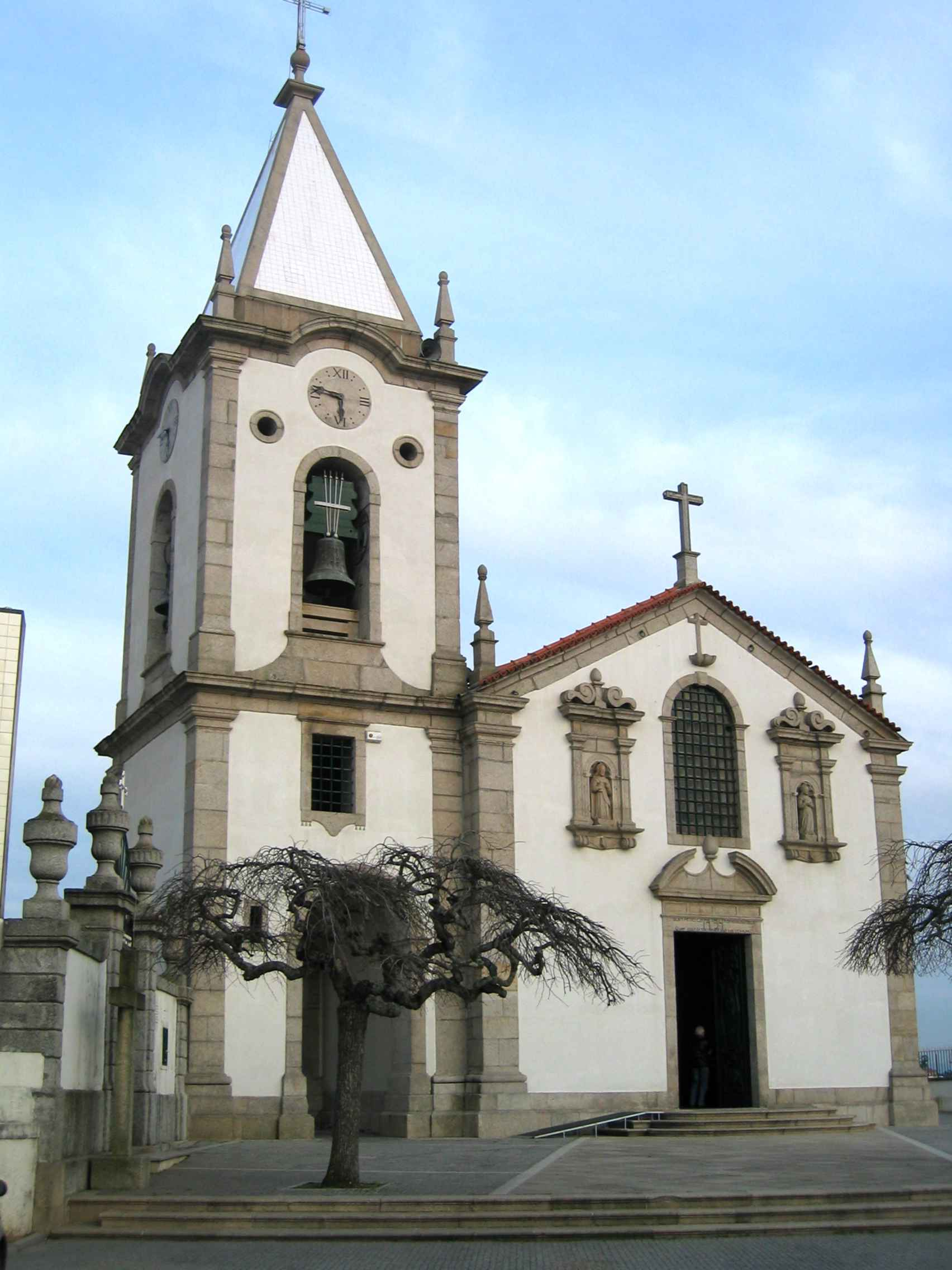
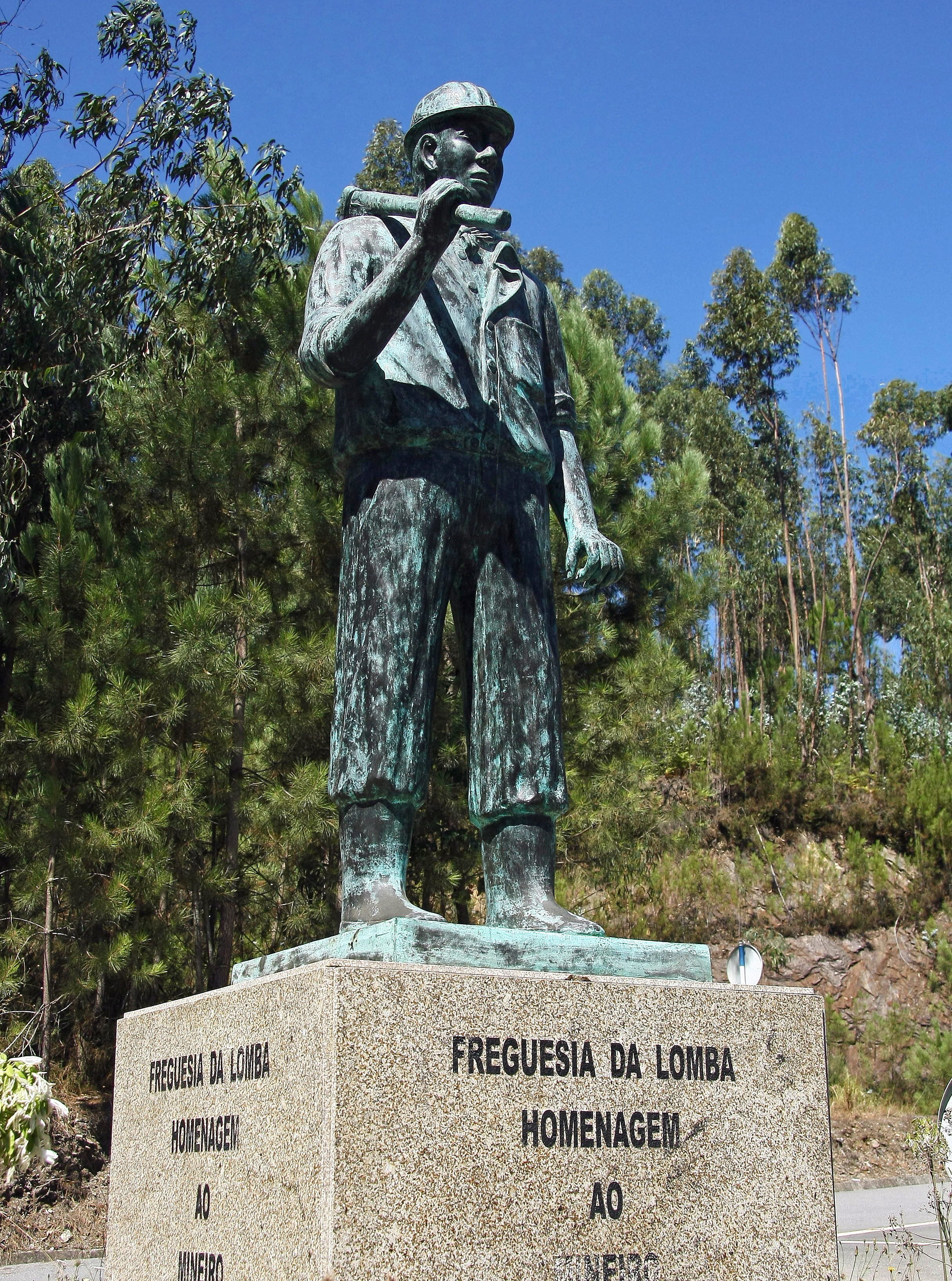
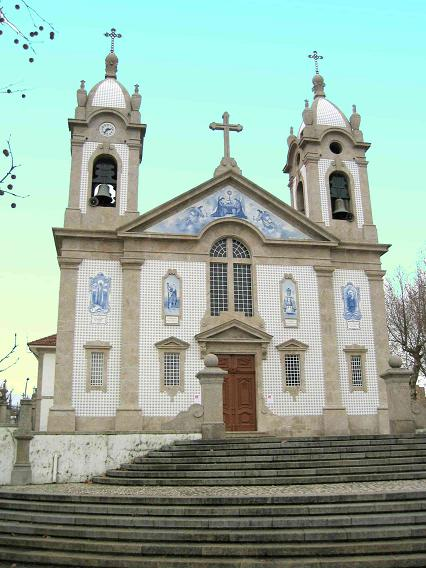
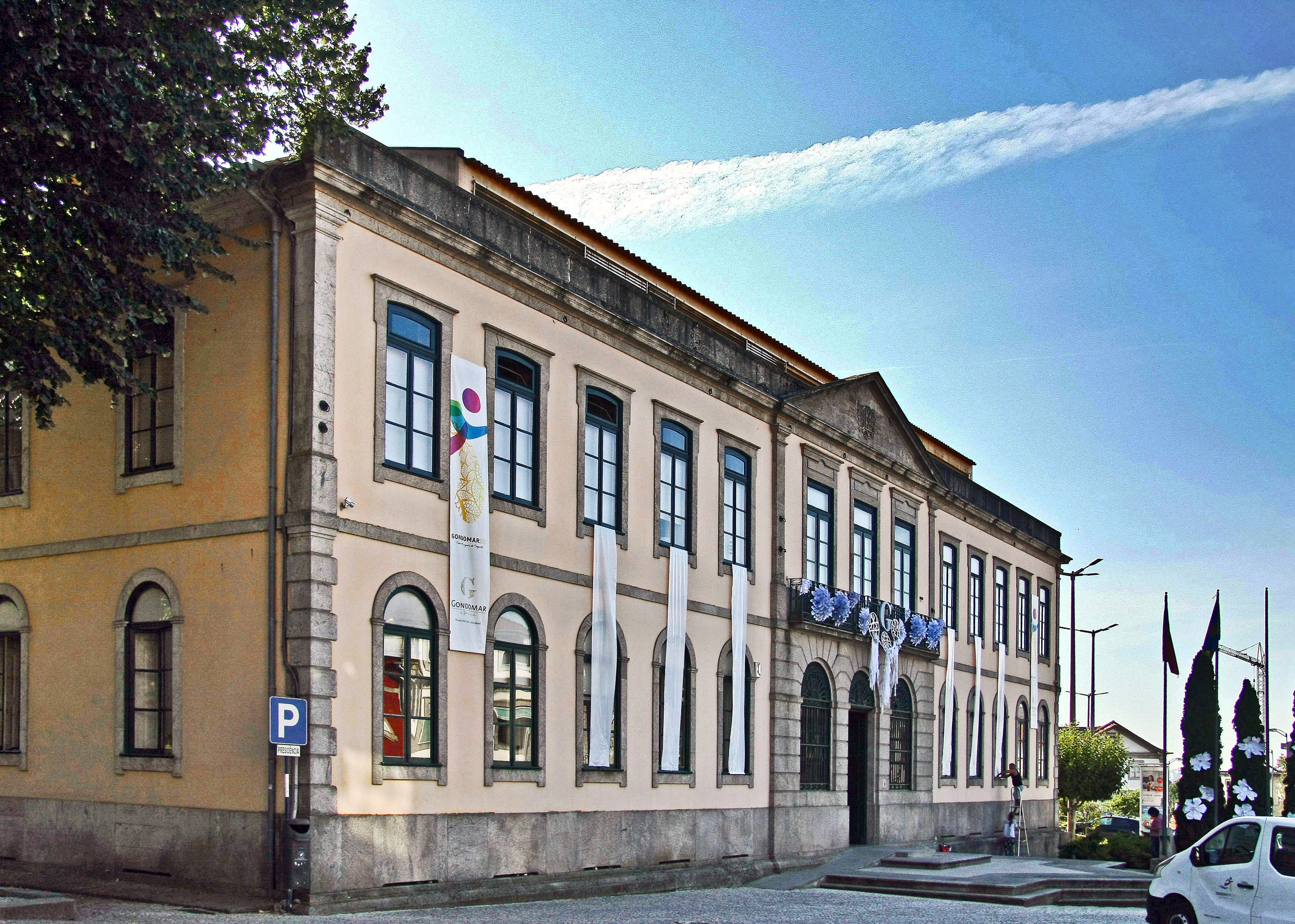
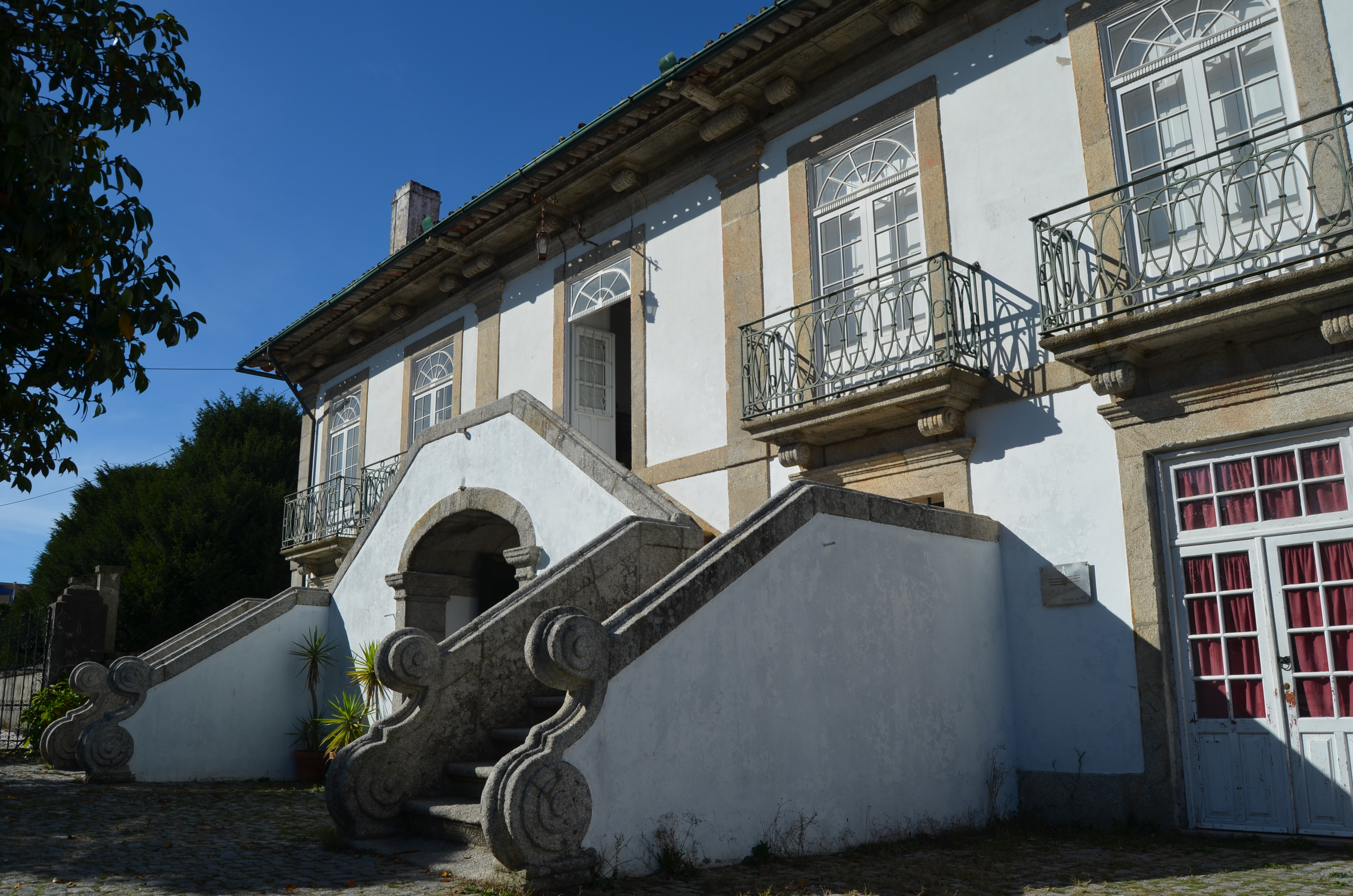

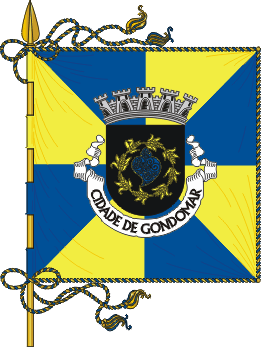
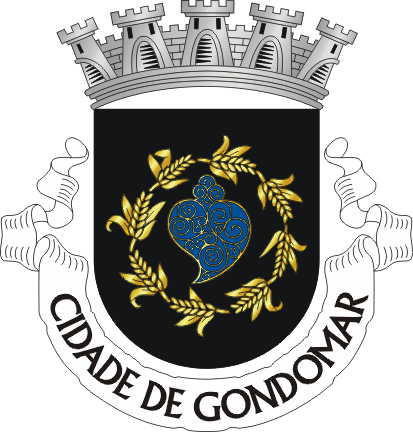
- Flag Coat of arms
- Interactive map of Gondomar
- Location in Portugal
- Coordinates: 41°9′N 8°32′W
- Country: Portugal
- Region: Norte
- Metropolitan area: Porto
- District: Porto
- Parishes: 7

Government
  - President: Luís Filipe Araújo (PS)

Area
  - Total: 131.86 km^{2} (50.91 sq mi)

Population (2021)
  - Total: 164,257
  - Density: 1,245.7/km^{2} (3,226.3/sq mi)
- Time zone: UTC+00:00 (WET)
  - Summer (DST): UTC+01:00 (WEST)
- Website: http://www.cm-gondomar.pt

Gondomar (Portuguese pronunciation: [ɡõ.duˈmaɾ]), officially the City of Gondomar (Portuguese: Cidade de Gondomar), is a Portuguese municipality located in the eastern part of the Porto Metropolitan Area, just 7 kilometres (4.3 mi) from central Porto. The population in 2021 was 164,257, in an area of 131.86 square kilometres (50.91 mi^{2}). The name "Gondomar" is sometimes attributed to the Visigothic king Gundemar, who may have established a religious domain in the region around the 7th century.

Notable for its long-standing tradition in jewelry-making, Gondomar is considered the heart of Portugal's goldsmithing industry, accounting for 42% of the country's annual production. Gondomar's local gastronomy is deeply influenced by the nearby Douro River with dishes like shad and lamprey being regional specialties. Gondomar's current mayor is Luís Filipe Araújo.

== History ==
Archaeological discoveries reveal that Gondomar has been inhabited since prehistoric times. The area also shows evidence of Roman occupation, particularly through gold mining activities in the surrounding regions.

The name "Gondomar" is often attributed to the Visigothic king Gundemar, who is said to have established a couto (ecclesiastical domain) there in 610, although no evidence supports the presence of Visigothic knights in the area. Gondomar officially became a couto in 1193 when King Sancho I granted the Carta de Couto as part of a conciliatory agreement with the Bishop of Porto, Martinho Rodrigues, following a conflict between the diocese and the monarchy. This charter confirmed and expanded the bishop's influence over the region, which had been part of the diocese's holdings since 1120 through a donation by Countess Teresa to Bishop Hugo. The Carta de Couto was later confirmed by King Afonso II during the Inquirições and recognized Gondomar as the honra (noble domain) of Soeiro Reymondo, who owned a manor in the area.

In 1515, during the reign of King Manuel I, Gondomar was granted its first foral (charter), which modernized its administrative and fiscal framework as part of the monarch's broader reforms aimed at centralizing power and updating local taxation systems. These fertile lands were also granted to Margarida de Vilhena, who was awarded various privileges, including income and rents from the territory.

Over the following centuries, the jurisdiction (Julgado) of Gondomar underwent several changes. Various administrative adjustments in the localities of Melres, Rio Tinto, Lomba, and São Pedro da Cova altered the municipality's boundaries. Avintes and Campanhã were previously a part of the municipality, although they are now part of the municipalities of Vila Nova de Gaia and Porto respectively.

In 1868, the parishes of São Cosme, Valbom, Rio Tinto, Fânzeres, São Pedro da Cova, Jovim, Foz do Sousa, Covelo, Medas, Melres, and Lomba were incorporated into the municipality. São Cosme was officially confirmed as Gondomar's municipal seat in 1927 following a formal request to the Presidency of the Republic.

In 1875, the opening of the Minho and Douro railway lines connected the parish of Rio Tinto to Porto and the Minho and Trás-os-Montes regions. The station became a vital hub for transporting goods such as coal from São Pedro da Cova, corn, furniture, and passengers, driving industrial development in the area. The original station, unable to accommodate growing demand, was replaced in 1935 by the current building. In 2011, the Porto Metro light-rail system reached the areas of Rio Tinto, Baguim do Monte and Fânzeres.

Significant milestones in the 20th century include the establishment of the parish of Baguim do Monte in 1985 and Gondomar's elevation to city status in 1991, followed by Rio Tinto in 1995 and Valbom in 2005.

== Cities and towns ==
Population of Gondomar Municipality (1801–2021)
Year	Pop.	±%
1801	7,220	—
1849	19,103	+164.6%
1864	21,834	+14.3%
1878	24,296	+11.3%
1890	31,142	+28.2%
1900	32,428	+4.1%
1911	38,251	+18.0%
1920	41,818	+9.3%
1930	49,768	+19.0%
1940	61,755	+24.1%
1950	71,068	+15.1%
1960	84,599	+19.0%
1970	105,705	+24.9%
1981	130,751	+23.7%
1991	143,178	+9.5%
2001	164,096	+14.6%
2011	168,027	+2.4%
2021	164,257	−2.2%
Source: INE

Cities are:

- Gondomar (1991)
- Rio Tinto (1995)
- Valbom (2005)

== Parishes ==
Administratively, the municipality is divided into 7 civil parishes (freguesias):

- Baguim do Monte
- Fânzeres e São Pedro da Cova
- Foz do Sousa e Covelo
- Lomba
- Melres e Medas
- Rio Tinto
- Gondomar (São Cosme), Valbom e Jovim

== Economy ==
Gondomar is recognized as the capital of goldsmithing in Portugal, accounting for 42% of the country's annual production in the jewelry and goldsmithing sector. The municipality is home to approximately 445 businesses in this field, 70% of which are sole proprietorships, generating an estimated turnover of 50 million euros annually and employing around 800 people, making it the fourth-largest employment sector in the municipality. Jewelry from Gondomar is exported to countries such as Spain, Hong Kong, Germany, Italy, the United States, France, and Switzerland. To further enhance the industry's identity and global reach, Gondomar launched the "Gondomar Original Jewellery" certification mark in 2023.

== Attractions ==
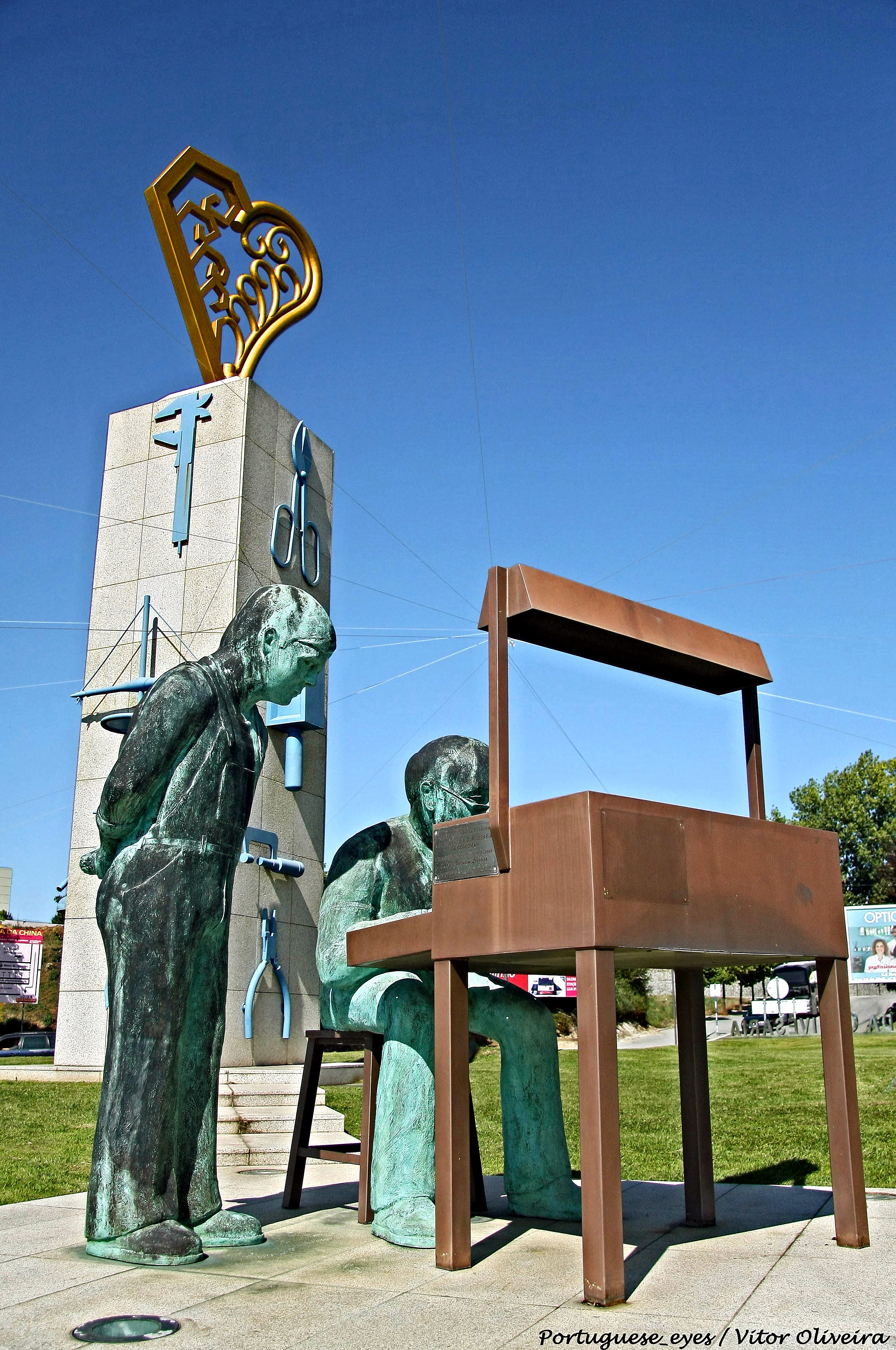
Monument to the goldsmith

Gondomar is home to two museums that highlight the region's industrial heritage: the Museu Municipal de Filigrana (Municipal Filigree Museum) and the Museu Mineiro de São Pedro da Cova (São Pedro da Cova Mining Museum).

The Museu Municipal de Filigrana, located at Casa Branca de Gramido in Valbom, showcases the municipality's rich tradition in filigree jewelry-making. Inaugurated on May 20, 2022, it features approximately 60 pieces of filigree, some of which were restored and inventoried by the municipality. It also includes tools, machinery, and furnishings donated by local artisans. Among its notable exhibits are a replica of the Belém Tower and a filigree dress designed by Micaela Oliveira in collaboration with jeweler Arlindo Moura.

The Museu Mineiro de São Pedro da Cova, established in 1989, aims to preserve and promote the geologic and mining history of the São Pedro da Cova area. It is located in one of the former "Casas da Malta".

== Sports ==
The town has one association football team called Gondomar who currently play in the Campeonato de Portugal, the fourth tier of Portuguese football. It plays in the São Miguel Stadium in São Cosme.

== Transports ==
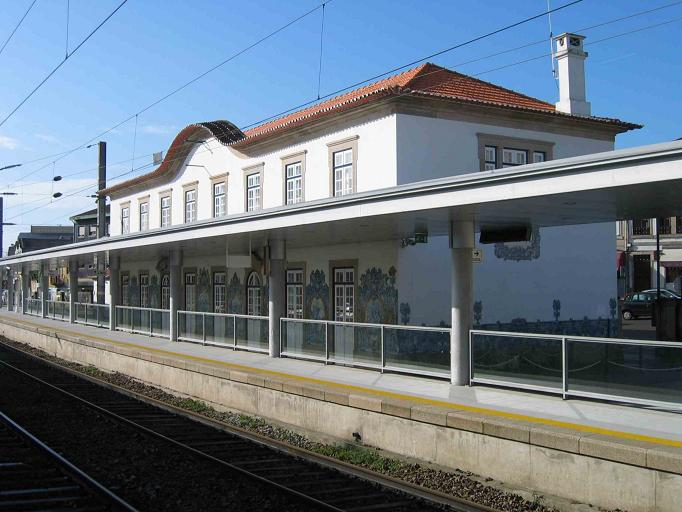
Rio Tinto railway station

Gondomar is integrated into the Porto metropolitan area's public transportation network. The Porto Metro serves the municipality with Line F (Orange Line), which connects Fânzeres, Baguim do Monte, and Rio Tinto to central Porto and the municipalities of Matosinhos, Maia, Vila do Conde and Póvoa de Varzim. The line has frequent service intervals of 15 minutes during peak hours.

The Rio Tinto railway station is part of Portugal's railway network, with Comboios de Portugal providing urban services to Porto, Braga, Guimarães, and Marco de Canaveses. It provides an interchange with the Porto Metro.

Additionally, Gondomar is served by STCP buses, which provide regular connections to Porto, and by other bus operators under the UNIR network, linking the municipality to surrounding areas.

== Notable people ==
- Raul Melo (born 1969) a politician of the Chega party in the Portuguese Parliament since 2024.
- Cláudia Pascoal (born 1994) a singer who represented Portugal at the Eurovision Song Contest 2018.
- João de Sahagún (1668–1730) a Roman Catholic prelate, Bishop of São Tomé e Príncipe 1709–1730.
- Isabel Santos (born 1968 in Valbom) a Portuguese politician and Member of the European Parliament since 2019.

=== Sport ===
- Pedro Barbosa (born 1970) a Portuguese retired footballer with 422 club caps and 22 for Portugal.
- Ricardo Braga (born 1985) known as Ricardinho a Portuguese futsal player who has played over 300 games and 160 for Portugal.
- André Castro (born 1988) known as Castro, a Portuguese footballer with over 360 club caps.
- Joaquim Ferreira da Costa (born 1953) known as Ferreira da Costa, a former football player and coach.
- Luís Frade (born 1998) a handball player who played for FC Barcelona and the Portuguese national team.
- Diogo Jota (1996–2025) a former footballer who played as central forward for Liverpool and the Portugal national team.
- Pedro Martins (born 1988) known as Coelho, a futsal player who played for Portugal's national team.
- Daniel Materazzi (born 1985) a footballer with over 320 club caps.
- Rui Óscar (born 1975) a former football player.
- Ivo Rodrigues (born 1995) a footballer who plays as a winger or attacking midfielder.
- André Silva (born 1995) a footballer who plays as a striker for RB Leipzig and the Portugal national team.
- Fábio Silva (born 2002) a footballer who plays as a forward for Borussia Dortmund and the Portugal national team.
- Jota Silva (born 1999) a footballer who plays as a winger for Olympiacos and the Portugal national team.
- Rómulo Silva (born 1976) known as Rómulo, a Portuguese former footballer with 506 club caps.
- Tiago Soares (born 1988) a former futsal player who played as a winger.

== Sister cities ==
Gondomar has the following sister cities:

- Barton-upon-Humber, United Kingdom (1993)
- Feyzin, France (1986)
- Gondomar, Spain (1981)
- Praia, Cape Verde (2001)

== See also ==
- Serras do Porto Park
