= List of J1 League transfers winter 2015–16 =

This is a list of Japanese football J1 League transfers in the winter transfer window 2015–16 by club.

== Sanfrecce Hiroshima ==
In: Note: Flags indicate national team as defined under FIFA eligibility rules; some limited exceptions apply. Players may hold more than one non-FIFA nationality.

No.	Pos.	Nation	Player
9	FW	NGR	Peter Utaka (from (Japan) Shimizu S-Pulse)
27	MF	KOR	Kim Byeom-yong (from (Japan) Montedio Yamagata)
24	MF	JPN	Yoichi Naganuma (promoted from youth ranks)
29	MF	JPN	Tsukasa Morishima (from Yokkaichi Chuo Kogyo High School)
31	FW	JPN	Takumi Miyayoshi (from (Japan) Kyoto Sanga)
35	DF	JPN	Naoki Otani (loan return from (Japan) Roasso Kumamoto)

Out: Note: Flags indicate national team as defined under FIFA eligibility rules; some limited exceptions apply. Players may hold more than one non-FIFA nationality.

No.	Pos.	Nation	Player
—	DF	KOR	Byeon Jun-Byum (loan to (Japan) Shimizu S-Pulse)
—	DF	KOR	Park Hyung-jin (to (Japan) V-Varen Nagasaki)
—	MF	KOR	Kim Jeong-Seok (released)
—	MF	JPN	Hironori Ishikawa (to (Japan) Thespakusatsu Gunma)
—	MF	JPN	Satoru Yamagishi (to (Japan) Oita Trinita)
—	MF	JPN	Kota Sameshima (to (Japan) Fujieda MYFC)
—	FW	BRA	Douglas (to (United Arab Emirates) Al Ain FC)

== Urawa Red Diamonds ==
In: Note: Flags indicate national team as defined under FIFA eligibility rules; some limited exceptions apply. Players may hold more than one non-FIFA nationality.

No.	Pos.	Nation	Player
6	MF	JPN	Wataru Endo (from (Japan) Shonan Bellmare)
18	MF	JPN	Yoshiaki Komai (from (Japan) Kyoto Sanga)
23	GK	JPN	Nao Iwadate (from (Japan) Mito Hollyhock)
26	MF	JPN	Ryotaro Ito (from Sakuyo High School)
28	GK	JPN	Haruki Fukushima (from Senshu University)
31	DF	SLO	Branko Ilić (from (Kazakhstan) Astana FC)
—	MF	JPN	Kazuki Nagasawa (from (Germany) 1. FC Köln)

Out: Note: Flags indicate national team as defined under FIFA eligibility rules; some limited exceptions apply. Players may hold more than one non-FIFA nationality.

No.	Pos.	Nation	Player
—	DF	JPN	Takuya Okamoto (loan to (Japan) Shonan Bellmare)
—	DF	JPN	Rikiya Motegi (loan to (Japan) Ehime FC)
—	MF	JPN	Shota Saito (loan to (Japan) Mito Hollyhock)
—	MF	JPN	Keita Suzuki (retired)
—	MF	JPN	Kazuki Nagasawa (loan to (Japan) JEF United Chiba)
—	FW	JPN	Toyofumi Sakano (loan to (Japan) Ehime FC)

== Gamba Osaka ==
In: Note: Flags indicate national team as defined under FIFA eligibility rules; some limited exceptions apply. Players may hold more than one non-FIFA nationality.

No.	Pos.	Nation	Player
9	FW	BRA	Ademilson (on loan from (Brazil) São Paulo)
17	MF	JPN	Kenya Okazaki (loan return from (Japan) Ehime FC)
23	FW	JPN	Hiroto Goya (from Kwansei Gakuin University Soccer Club)
24	FW	JPN	Naoki Ogawa (loan return from (Japan) Fujieda MYFC)
25	MF	JPN	Jungo Fujimoto (from (Japan) Yokohama F. Marinos)
32	DF	JPN	Hiroki Noda (from Ohzu High School Kumamoto)
33	FW	JPN	Kazunari Ichimi (from Ohzu High School)
35	DF	JPN	Ryo Hatsuse (promoted from youth ranks)
37	FW	JPN	Akito Takagi (promoted from youth ranks)
38	DF	JPN	Ritsu Doan (promoted from youth ranks)
40	MF	JPN	Shōhei Ogura (loan return from (Japan) Montedio Yamagata)
—	MF	JPN	Mizuki Ichimaru (promoted from youth ranks)

Out: Note: Flags indicate national team as defined under FIFA eligibility rules; some limited exceptions apply. Players may hold more than one non-FIFA nationality.

No.	Pos.	Nation	Player
—	DF	JPN	Yuto Uchida (to (Japan) Tokushima Vortis)
—	MF	JPN	Tomokazu Myojin (to (Japan) Nagoya Grampus)
—	FW	BRA	Lins (released)
—	FW	JPN	Shingo Akamine (on loan to (Japan) Fagiano Okayama)

== FC Tokyo ==
In: Note: Flags indicate national team as defined under FIFA eligibility rules; some limited exceptions apply. Players may hold more than one non-FIFA nationality.

No.	Pos.	Nation	Player
14	MF	KOR	Ha Dae-sung (from (China) Beijing Guoan)
44	FW	JPN	Takuma Abe (from (Japan) Ventforet Kofu)
47	GK	JPN	Yota Akimoto (from (Japan) Shonan Bellmare)
48	MF	JPN	Kota Mizunuma (from (Japan) Sagan Tosu)
50	DF	JPN	Yuichi Komano (from (Japan) Jubilo Iwata)
—	DF	JPN	Sei Muroya (from Meiji University Football Club)
—	DF	JPN	Takahiro Yanagi (promoted from youth ranks)
—	MF	KOR	Yu In-Soo (from Kwangwoon University)

Out: Note: Flags indicate national team as defined under FIFA eligibility rules; some limited exceptions apply. Players may hold more than one non-FIFA nationality.

No.	Pos.	Nation	Player
—	GK	JPN	Shuichi Gonda (on loan to (Austria) SV Horn)
—	GK	SRB	Vlada Avramov (released)
—	DF	JPN	Kosuke Ota (to (Netherlands) Vitesse Arnhem)
—	DF	JPN	Riku Matsuda (to (Japan) Cerezo Osaka)
—	DF	JPN	Tatsuki Nara (loan return to (Japan) Consadole Sapporo)
—	MF	JPN	Hirotaka Mita (on loan to (Japan) Vegalta Sendai)

== Kashima Antlers ==
In: Note: Flags indicate national team as defined under FIFA eligibility rules; some limited exceptions apply. Players may hold more than one non-FIFA nationality.

No.	Pos.	Nation	Player
1	GK	JPN	Masatoshi Kushibiki (on loan from (Japan) Shimizu S-Pulse)
6	MF	JPN	Ryota Nagaki (from (Japan) Shonan Bellmare)
15	FW	JPN	Hiroyuki Takasaki (loan return from (Japan) Montedio Yamagata)
17	DF	BRA	Daniel Bueno (from (Japan) Shimizu S-Pulse)
20	MF	JPN	Kento Misao (from (Japan) Tokyo Verdy)
36	MF	JPN	Toshiya Tanaka (promoted from youth ranks)
38	MF	JPN	Taiki Hirato (promoted from youth ranks)
39	DF	JPN	Koki Machida (promoted from youth ranks)
—	FW	JPN	Yuki Kakita (promoted from youth ranks)

Out: Note: Flags indicate national team as defined under FIFA eligibility rules; some limited exceptions apply. Players may hold more than one non-FIFA nationality.

No.	Pos.	Nation	Player
—	GK	JPN	Akihiro Sato (to (Japan) Roasso Kumamoto)
—	DF	JPN	Kazuya Yamamura (to (Japan) Cerezo Osaka)
—	DF	JPN	Ryuga Suzuki (to (Japan) Ehime FC)
—	MF	JPN	Takahide Umebachi (on loan to (Japan) Montedio Yamagata)
—	MF	JPN	Mu Kanazaki (loan return to (Portugal) Portimonense S.C.)
—	MF	JPN	Masashi Motoyama (to (Japan) Giravanz Kitakyushu)
—	FW	JPN	Yuta Toyokawa (on loan to (Japan) Fagiano Okayama)
—	FW	BRA	Davi (released)

== Kawasaki Frontale ==
In: Note: Flags indicate national team as defined under FIFA eligibility rules; some limited exceptions apply. Players may hold more than one non-FIFA nationality.

No.	Pos.	Nation	Player
1	GK	KOR	Jung Sung-ryong (from (South Korea) Suwon Samsung Bluewings)
3	DF	JPN	Tatsuki Nara (from (Japan) Consadole Sapporo)
9	FW	JPN	Takayuki Morimoto (from (Japan) JEF United Chiba)
15	MF	JPN	Riki Harakawa (from (Japan) Kyoto Sanga)
16	FW	JPN	Tatsuya Hasegawa (from Juntendo University)
21	DF	BRA	Eduardo Neto (from (Brazil) Avaí FC)
25	MF	JPN	Kenta Kano (from (Japan) Kashiwa Reysol)
27	FW	JPN	Shohei Otsuka (from (Japan) Giravanz Kitakyushu)
29	GK	JPN	Shun Takagi (from (Japan) JEF United Chiba)

Out: Note: Flags indicate national team as defined under FIFA eligibility rules; some limited exceptions apply. Players may hold more than one non-FIFA nationality.

No.	Pos.	Nation	Player
—	GK	JPN	Kenya Matsui (to (Japan) Omiya Ardija)
—	GK	JPN	Yohei Nishibe (to (Japan) Shimizu S-Pulse)
—	DF	JPN	Yuki Saneto (to (Japan) Avispa Fukuoka)
—	DF	JPN	Kyotaro Yamakoshi (to (Japan) Tochigi SC)
—	DF	JPN	Makoto Kakuda (released)
—	DF	JPN	Sota Nakazawa (to (Japan) Cerezo Osaka, previously on loan)
—	DF	JPN	Shun Morishita (to (Japan) Jubilo Iwata, previously on loan)
—	MF	JPN	Masaki Yamamoto (to (Japan) JEF United Chiba)
—	MF	JPN	Masataka Kani (on loan to (Japan) Zweigen Kanazawa)
—	MF	BRA	Arthur Maia (loan return to (Brazil) Vitória)
—	FW	JPN	Yasuhito Morishima (to (Japan) Jubilo Iwata, previously on loan)
—	FW	JPN	Kenyu Sugimoto (to (Japan) Cerezo Osaka)
—	FW	JPN	Takayuki Funayama (to (Japan) JEF United Chiba)
—	FW	PRK	An Byong-jun (on loan to (Japan) Zweigen Kanazawa)

== Yokohama F. Marinos ==
In: Note: Flags indicate national team as defined under FIFA eligibility rules; some limited exceptions apply. Players may hold more than one non-FIFA nationality.

No.	Pos.	Nation	Player
2	DF	KOR	Park Jong-su (promoted from youth ranks)
15	DF	JPN	Ikki Arai (from Juntendo University)
18	MF	JPN	Keita Endo (promoted from youth ranks)
24	DF	JPN	Takashi Kanai (from (Japan) JEF United Chiba)
25	MF	JPN	Naoki Maeda (loan return from (Japan) V-Varen Nagasaki)
31	GK	JPN	Takuya Takahashi (from (Japan) YSCC)
37	FW	JPN	Cayman Togashi (from Kanto Gakuin University)
40	FW	JPN	Masashi Wada (promoted from youth ranks)

Out: Note: Flags indicate national team as defined under FIFA eligibility rules; some limited exceptions apply. Players may hold more than one non-FIFA nationality.

No.	Pos.	Nation	Player
—	GK	JPN	Ryota Suzuki (on loan to (Japan) Tokyo Verdy)
—	DF	JPN	Fumitaka Kitatani (on loan to (Japan) Renofa Yamaguchi)
—	DF	JPN	Takashi Amano (to (Japan) Nagano Parceiro)
—	DF	JPN	Yuta Narawa (to (Japan) Shonan Bellmare)
—	DF	JPN	Yusuke Higa (to (Japan) JEF United Chiba)
—	MF	JPN	Andrew Kumagai (on loan to (Japan) Zweigen Kanazawa)
—	MF	JPN	Jungo Fujimoto (to (Japan) Gamba Osaka)
—	MF	JPN	Sho Matsumoto (released)
—	MF	JPN	Yūhei Satō (to (Japan) Montedio Yamagata)
—	FW	JPN	Takuro Yajima (to (Japan) Kyoto Sanga)
—	FW	BRA	Ademilson (loan return to (Brazil) São Paulo)
—	FW	JPN	Jin Hanato (to (Japan) Shonan Bellmare)

== Shonan Bellmare ==
In: Note: Flags indicate national team as defined under FIFA eligibility rules; some limited exceptions apply. Players may hold more than one non-FIFA nationality.

No.	Pos.	Nation	Player
1	GK	JPN	Tomohiko Murayama (from (Japan) Matsumoto Yamaga)
3	DF	JPN	Ryohei Okazaki (loan return from (Japan) Roasso Kumamoto)
5	MF	BRA	Paulinho (from (Japan) JEF United Chiba)
13	MF	JPN	Miki Yamane (from Toin University of Yokohama)
17	FW	JPN	Jin Hanato (from (Japan) Yokohama F. Marinos)
22	MF	JPN	Hokuto Shimoda (from (Japan) Ventforet Kofu)
24	DF	JPN	Yuta Narawa (from (Japan) Yokohama F. Marinos)
25	GK	JPN	Tando Velaphi (from (Australia) Melbourne City FC)
28	MF	JPN	Yuta Kamiya (from Aomori Yamada High School)
33	MF	JPN	Shota Tamura (loan return from (Japan) Fukushima United FC)
36	DF	JPN	Takuya Okamoto (loan from (Japan) Urawa Red Diamonds)

Out: Note: Flags indicate national team as defined under FIFA eligibility rules; some limited exceptions apply. Players may hold more than one non-FIFA nationality.

No.	Pos.	Nation	Player
—	GK	JPN	Yota Akimoto (to (Japan) FC Tokyo)
—	GK	KOR	Lee Ho-seung (to (South Korea) Jeonnam Dragons)
—	DF	JPN	Shota Kobayashi (to (Japan) Nagoya Grampus)
—	DF	JPN	Masashi Kamekawa (to (Japan) Avispa Fukuoka, previously on loan)
—	DF	JPN	Kenta Hirose (on loan to (Japan) Tochigi SC)
—	MF	JPN	Ryota Kajikawa (to (Japan) V-Varen Nagasaki, previously on loan)
—	MF	KOR	Kim Jong-pil (on loan to (Thailand) Chonburi FC)
—	MF	JPN	Wataru Endo (to (Japan) Urawa Red Diamonds)
—	MF	JPN	Kosuke Shirai (to (Japan) Ehime FC, previously on loan)
—	MF	JPN	Akira Ando (on loan to (Japan) Zweigen Kanazawa)
—	MF	JPN	Ken Iwao (to (Japan) Tokushima Vortis)
—	MF	JPN	Ryota Nagaki (to (Japan) Kashima Antlers)
—	MF	JPN	Atsushi Sawada (released)
—	FW	JPN	Tsuyoshi Miyaichi (on loan to (Japan) Gainare Tottori)
—	FW	BRA	Alison (released)
—	FW	BRA	Amorim (released)

== Nagoya Grampus ==
In: Note: Flags indicate national team as defined under FIFA eligibility rules; some limited exceptions apply. Players may hold more than one non-FIFA nationality.

No.	Pos.	Nation	Player
3	DF	SWE	Ludvig Öhman (from (Sweden) Kalmar)
6	DF	JPN	Shota Kobayashi (from (Japan) Shonan Bellmare)
9	FW	SWE	Robin Simović (from (Sweden) Helsingborg)
15	MF	Korea	Lee Seung-hee (from (Thailand) Suphanburi)
16	GK	JPN	Yohei Takeda (from (Japan) Oita Trinita)
17	MF	JPN	Tomokazu Myojin (from (Japan) Gamba Osaka)
23	MF	JPN	Ryota Aoki (from (Japan) Thespakusatsu Gunma)
28	GK	JPN	Kota Ogi (from (Japan) Ventforet Kofu)
33	DF	JPN	Michihiro Yasuda (from (Japan) Vissel Kobe)
38	FW	JPN	Riki Matsuda (loan return from (Japan) JEF United)

Out: Note: Flags indicate national team as defined under FIFA eligibility rules; some limited exceptions apply. Players may hold more than one non-FIFA nationality.

No.	Pos.	Nation	Player
3	DF	JPN	Yusuke Muta (to (Japan) Kyoto Sanga)
4	DF	JPN	Tulio
6	DF	JPN	Yuki Honda (to (Japan) Kyoto Sanga)
8	MF	COL	Danilson Córdoba (to (Japan) Avispa Fukuoka)
18	FW	SLO	Milivoje Novaković
23	MF	JPN	Ryota Aoki
24	DF	JPN	Nikki Havenaar
25	MF	JPN	Reo Mochizuki (on loan to (Japan) Renofa Yamaguchi)
29	DF	JPN	Kazuki Sato
30	GK	JPN	Masataka Nomura
33	MF	BRA	Leandro Domingues
35	MF	JPN	Teruki Tanaka
50	GK	JPN	Yoshinari Takagi

== Kashiwa Reysol ==
In: Note: Flags indicate national team as defined under FIFA eligibility rules; some limited exceptions apply. Players may hold more than one non-FIFA nationality.

No.	Pos.	Nation	Player
2	DF	JPN	Jiro Kamata (from (Japan) Vegalta Sendai)
9	FW	JPN	Junya Tanaka (on loan from (Portugal) Sporting CP)
11	FW	BRA	Diego Oliveira (from (Brazil) Ponte Preta)
14	FW	JPN	Junya Ito (from (Japan) Ventforet Kofu)
20	MF	BRA	Juliano Mineiro (from (Thailand) Chonburi FC)
21	DF	JPN	Masato Yuzawa (from Ryutsu Keizai University FC)
23	GK	JPN	Kosuke Nakamura (loan return from (Japan) Avispa Fukuoka)
30	MF	JPN	Kohei Tezuka (promoted from youth ranks)
32	GK	JPN	Haruhiko Takimoto (promoted from youth ranks)
33	MF	JPN	Kaito Anzai (promoted from youth ranks)

Out: Note: Flags indicate national team as defined under FIFA eligibility rules; some limited exceptions apply. Players may hold more than one non-FIFA nationality.

No.	Pos.	Nation	Player
—	GK	JPN	Ryuki Miura (to (Japan) Nagano Parceiro)
—	GK	JPN	Takanori Sugeno (to (Japan) Kyoto Sanga)
—	DF	JPN	Masato Fujita (to (Japan) Sagan Tosu)
—	DF	JPN	Daisuke Suzuki (released)
—	DF	JPN	Naoya Kondo (to (Japan) JEF United Chiba)
—	DF	KOR	Kim Chang-soo (to (South Korea) Jeonbuk Hyundai Motors FC)
—	MF	JPN	Kenta Kano (to (Japan) Kawasaki Frontale)
—	FW	JPN	Masato Kudo (to (Canada) Vancouver Whitecaps FC)
—	FW	BRA	Cristiano (loan return to (Japan) Ventforet Kofu)

== Sagan Tosu ==
In: Note: Flags indicate national team as defined under FIFA eligibility rules; some limited exceptions apply. Players may hold more than one non-FIFA nationality.

No.	Pos.	Nation	Player
2	DF	JPN	Hiromu Mitsumaru (from Tsukuba University)
8	DF	JPN	Masato Fujita (from (Japan) Kashiwa Reysol)
12	GK	JPN	Shingo Tsuji (from (Japan) JEF United Chiba)
18	FW	JPN	Takamitsu Tomiyama (from (Japan) Omiya Ardija)
19	MF	JPN	Jumpei Kusukami (from (Japan) Cerezo Osaka)
20	MF	JPN	Keiya Nakami (from (Japan) Tochigi SC)
21	GK	JPN	Ayumi Niekawa (on loan from (Japan) Jubilo Iwata)

Out: Note: Flags indicate national team as defined under FIFA eligibility rules; some limited exceptions apply. Players may hold more than one non-FIFA nationality.

No.	Pos.	Nation	Player
—	GK	JPN	Tatsuro Okuda (to (Japan) Jubilo Iwata)
—	GK	JPN	Eisuke Fujishima (on loan to (Japan) JEF United Chiba)
—	DF	JPN	Shuhei Sasahara (released)
—	MF	JPN	Kota Mizunuma (to (Japan) FC Tokyo)
—	MF	JPN	Naoyuki Fujita (to (Japan) Vissel Kobe)
—	FW	JPN	Ryosuke Tamura (end of loan, return to (Japan) Kyoto Sanga)
—	FW	JPN	Ryogo Yamasaki (on loan to (Japan) Tokushima Vortis)
—	FW	JPN	Minoru Suganuma (released)

== Vissel Kobe ==
In: Note: Flags indicate national team as defined under FIFA eligibility rules; some limited exceptions apply. Players may hold more than one non-FIFA nationality.

No.	Pos.	Nation	Player
2	DF	JPN	Yudai Tanaka (from (Japan) Mito Hollyhock)
14	MF	JPN	Naoyuki Fujita (from (Japan) Sagan Tosu)
18	GK	KOR	Kim Seung-gyu (from (South Korea) Ulsan Hyundai)
25	DF	JPN	Junya Higashi (promoted from youth ranks)
27	MF	JPN	Ryo Matsumura (loan return from (Japan) Tochigi SC)
31	MF	JPN	Yuya Nakasaka (promoted from youth ranks)
33	DF	JPN	Taisuke Muramatsu (on loan from (Japan) Shimizu S-Pulse)
34	DF	JPN	So Fujitani (promoted from youth ranks)
39	DF	JPN	Masahiko Inoha (from (Japan) Jubilo Iwata)

Out: Note: Flags indicate national team as defined under FIFA eligibility rules; some limited exceptions apply. Players may hold more than one non-FIFA nationality.

No.	Pos.	Nation	Player
—	GK	JPN	Kenshin Yoshimaru (on loan to (Japan) Oita Trinita)
—	DF	JPN	Michihiro Yasuda (to (Japan) Nagoya Grampus)
—	DF	KOR	Gang Yong-goo (released)
—	DF	JPN	Takahiro Masukawa (to (Japan) Consadole Sapporo)
—	MF	KOR	Jung Woo-young (to (China) Chongqing Lifan)
—	MF	JPN	Ryo Okui (to (Japan) Omiya Ardija)
—	MF	JPN	Ryota Morioka (to (Poland) Śląsk Wrocław)
—	MF	JPN	Tomoki Wada (released)
—	FW	BRA	Marquinhos (released)

== Ventforet Kofu ==
In: Note: Flags indicate national team as defined under FIFA eligibility rules; some limited exceptions apply. Players may hold more than one non-FIFA nationality.

No.	Pos.	Nation	Player
5	DF	JPN	Ryo Shinzato (from (Japan) Mito Hollyhock)
6	DF	BRA	Gilton Ribeiro (from (Brazil) Clube Atlético Metropolitano)
9	FW	BRA	Nilson (on loan from (Brazil) Cianorte)
10	FW	BRA	Cristiano (loan return from (Japan) Kashiwa Reysol)
13	FW	JPN	Akito Kawamoto (loan return from (Japan) Tochigi SC)
14	MF	JPN	Yusuke Tanaka (from (Japan) JEF United Chiba)
15	MF	JPN	Takamitsu Yoshino (from (Japan) Cerezo Osaka)
20	MF	JPN	Masato Kurogi (from (Japan) V-Varen Nagasaki)
22	GK	JPN	Hiroki Oka (loan return from (Japan) JEF United Chiba)
24	DF	JPN	Naoya Shibamura (from (Poland) OKS Stomil Olsztyn)
25	FW	JPN	Akira Futoshi (from (Japan) Nagoya Grampus)
27	MF	AUS	Billy Celeski (from (Australia) Newcastle Jets)
29	DF	JPN	Masaki Watanabe (loan return from (Japan) FC Gifu)

Out: Note: Flags indicate national team as defined under FIFA eligibility rules; some limited exceptions apply. Players may hold more than one non-FIFA nationality.

No.	Pos.	Nation	Player
—	GK	JPN	Kota Ogi (to (Japan) Nagoya Grampus)
—	DF	JPN	Shohei Abe (to (Japan) JEF United Chiba)
—	MF	BRA	Marquinhos Paraná (released)
—	MF	JPN	Taisuke Akiyoshi (on loan to (Japan) Fagiano Okayama)
—	MF	JPN	Hokuto Shimoda (to (Japan) Shonan Bellmare)
—	MF	JPN	Yuki Horigome (to (Japan) Kyoto Sanga)
—	FW	JPN	Takuma Abe (to (Japan) FC Tokyo)
—	FW	BRA	Baré (released)
—	FW	JPN	Daiki Matsumoto (on loan to (Japan) V-Varen Nagasaki)
—	FW	JPN	Junya Ito (to (Japan) Kashiwa Reysol)
—	FW	BRA	Maranhão (released)

== Vegalta Sendai ==
In: Note: Flags indicate national team as defined under FIFA eligibility rules; some limited exceptions apply. Players may hold more than one non-FIFA nationality.

No.	Pos.	Nation	Player
13	DF	JPN	Yasuhiro Hiraoka (on loan from (Japan) Shimizu S-Pulse)
18	MF	JPN	Hirotaka Mita (on loan from (Japan) FC Tokyo)
24	MF	JPN	Yuto Sashinami (from Meiji University)
27	DF	JPN	Kazuki Oiwa (from (Japan) JEF United Chiba)
28	MF	JPN	Takumi Sasaki (promoted from youth ranks)
29	MF	JPN	Koki Mizuno (from (Japan) JEF United Chiba)
31	MF	JPN	Shunsuke Motegi (from (Japan) Zweigen Kanazawa, previously on loan)
32	DF	JPN	Masaya Kojima (promoted from youth ranks)
33	DF	JPN	Masato Tokida (from Aomori Yamada High School)
34	MF	JPN	Keiya Shiihashi (from Ichiritsu Funabashi High School)

Out: Note: Flags indicate national team as defined under FIFA eligibility rules; some limited exceptions apply. Players may hold more than one non-FIFA nationality.

No.	Pos.	Nation	Player
—	GK	JPN	Daniel Schmidt (on loan to (Japan) Matsumoto Yamaga)
—	DF	JPN	Jiro Kamata (to (Japan) Kashiwa Reysol)
—	DF	JPN	Atsuro Tatara (to (Japan) JEF United Chiba)
—	DF	JPN	Taikai Uemoto (to (Japan) V-Varen Nagasaki)
—	DF	JPN	Kazuhiro Murakami (retired)
—	MF	JPN	Takuya Takei (to (Japan) Matsumoto Yamaga)
—	FW	JPN	Hiroki Yamamoto (to (Japan) Matsumoto Yamaga)

== Albirex Niigata ==
In: Note: Flags indicate national team as defined under FIFA eligibility rules; some limited exceptions apply. Players may hold more than one non-FIFA nationality.

No.	Pos.	Nation	Player
3	DF	JPN	Shigeto Masuda (loan return from (Japan) Machida Zelvia)
17	MF	JPN	Yuta Ito (from (Japan) Kyoto Sanga)
19	FW	JPN	Musashi Suzuki (loan return from (Japan) Mito Hollyhock)
23	MF	JPN	Noriyoshi Sakai (loan return from (Japan) Avispa Fukuoka)
24	DF	JPN	Ryoma Nishimura (loan return from (Japan) Azul Claro Numazu)
29	MF	JPN	Kiwara Miyazaki (promoted from youth ranks)
41	MF	JPN	Kazuki Kozuka (loan return from (Japan) Renofa Yamaguchi)
—	MF	PER	Romero Frank (from (Japan) Montedio Yamagata)

Out: Note: Flags indicate national team as defined under FIFA eligibility rules; some limited exceptions apply. Players may hold more than one non-FIFA nationality.

No.	Pos.	Nation	Player
—	DF	JPN	Goson Sakai (on loan to (Japan) Fukushima United)
—	DF	JPN	Kentaro Oi (to (Japan) Jubilo Iwata)
—	DF	JPN	Naoki Kawaguchi (on loan to (Japan) Shimizu S-Pulse)
—	MF	JPN	Kosuke Yamamoto (loan return to (Japan) Jubilo Iwata)
—	MF	PER	Romero Frank (on loan to (Japan) Mito Hollyhock)
—	FW	BRA	Rafael Silva (loan return to (Brazil) Ponte Preta)

== Omiya Ardija ==
In: Note: Flags indicate national team as defined under FIFA eligibility rules; some limited exceptions apply. Players may hold more than one non-FIFA nationality.

No.	Pos.	Nation	Player
5	DF	JPN	Keigo Numata (from (Japan) Kamatamare Sanuki)
7	MF	JPN	Ataru Esaka (from (Japan) Thespakusatsu Gunma)
9	FW	SLO	Nejc Pečnik (from (Japan) JEF United Chiba)
10	MF	JPN	Yuzo Iwakami (from (Japan) Matsumoto Yamaga)
19	MF	JPN	Ryo Okui (from (Japan) Vissel Kobe)
27	MF	JPN	Atsushi Kurokawa (promoted from youth ranks)
29	FW	JPN	Kento Kawata (promoted from youth ranks)
30	FW	JPN	Takumu Fujinuma (promoted from youth ranks)
32	GK	JPN	Yuuki Kato (promoted from youth ranks)
50	GK	JPN	Kenya Matsui (from (Japan) Kawasaki Frontale)

Out: Note: Flags indicate national team as defined under FIFA eligibility rules; some limited exceptions apply. Players may hold more than one non-FIFA nationality.

No.	Pos.	Nation	Player
—	GK	JPN	Shuhei Kawata (on loan to (Japan) Tochigi SC)
—	GK	JPN	Keiki Shimizu (on loan to (Japan) Thespakusatsu Gunma)
—	DF	JPN	Yosuke Kataoka (to (Japan) Gainare Tottori)
—	DF	JPN	Yuta Fujii (to (Japan) Yokohama FC)
—	DF	JPN	Yuko Takase (on loan to (Japan) Thespakusatsu Gunma)
—	MF	BRA	Carlinhos (to (Japan) Tokushima Vortis)
—	MF	JPN	Daigo Watanabe (to (South Korea) Busan IPark)
—	FW	JPN	Takamitsu Tomiyama (to (Japan) Sagan Tosu)

== Jùbilo Iwata ==
In: Note: Flags indicate national team as defined under FIFA eligibility rules; some limited exceptions apply. Players may hold more than one non-FIFA nationality.

No.	Pos.	Nation	Player
2	DF	JPN	Taisuke Nakamura (from (Japan) JEF United Chiba)
3	DF	JPN	Kentaro Oi (from (Japan) Albirex Niigata)
14	DF	JPN	Kazumichi Takagi (from (Japan) FC Gifu)
15	FW	BRA	Adailton (from (Brazil) Paraná Clube, previously on loan)
16	FW	JPN	Kazuki Saito (from (Japan) Roasso Kumamoto)
18	FW	JPN	Koki Ogawa (from Toko Gakuen High School)
20	FW	JPN	Yasuhito Morishima (from (Japan) Kawasaki Frontale, previously on loan)
23	DF	JPN	Kosuke Yamamoto (loan return from (Japan) Albirex Niigata)
25	DF	JPN	Takuma Ominami (from Kagoshima Jitsugyō High School)
27	MF	JPN	Daigo Araki (from Aoyama Gakuin University)
35	DF	JPN	Shun Morishita (from (Japan) Kawasaki Frontale, previously on loan)
36	GK	JPN	Tatsuro Okuda (from (Japan) Sagan Tosu)

Out: Note: Flags indicate national team as defined under FIFA eligibility rules; some limited exceptions apply. Players may hold more than one non-FIFA nationality.

No.	Pos.	Nation	Player
—	GK	JPN	Ayumi Niekawa (on loan to (Japan) Sagan Tosu)
—	DF	JPN	Masahiko Inoha (to (Japan) Vissel Kobe)
—	DF	JPN	Yuichi Komano (to (Japan) FC Tokyo)
—	DF	JPN	Takaaki Kinoshita (to (Japan) Mito Hollyhock)
—	DF	JPN	Shusuke Tsubouchi (to (Japan) Thespakusatsu Gunma)
—	MF	JPN	Hiroto Tanaka (on loan to (Japan) V-Varen Nagasaki)
—	MF	JPN	Sena Inami (retired)
—	GK	JPN	Ayumi Niekawa (on loan to (Japan) Sagan Tosu)

== Avispa Fukuoka ==
In: Note: Flags indicate national team as defined under FIFA eligibility rules; some limited exceptions apply. Players may hold more than one non-FIFA nationality.

No.	Pos.	Nation	Player
5	DF	JPN	Yuki Saneto (from (Japan) Kawasaki Frontale)
6	MF	COL	Danilson Córdoba (from (Japan) Nagoya Grampus)
13	FW	JPN	Hirotaka Tameda (from (Japan) Oita Trinita)
18	DF	JPN	Masashi Kamekawa (from (Japan) Shonan Bellmare, previously on loan)
20	DF	KOR	Kim Hyun-hun (from (Japan) JEF United Chiba)
23	GK	KOR	Lee Bum-young (from (South Korea) Busan IPark)
25	GK	JPN	Akishige Kaneda (from (Japan) Montedio Yamagata)
29	MF	JPN	Kenta Furube (from (Japan) V-Varen Nagasaki)
30	DF	JPN	Koki Shimokasa (from National Institute of Fitness and Sports in Kanoya)
32	DF	JPN	Takehiro Tomiyasu (promoted from youth ranks)

Out: Note: Flags indicate national team as defined under FIFA eligibility rules; some limited exceptions apply. Players may hold more than one non-FIFA nationality.

No.	Pos.	Nation	Player
—	GK	JPN	Kosuke Nakamura (loan return to (Japan) Kashiwa Reysol)
—	GK	JPN	Eita Kasagawa (to Albirex Niigata Singapore FC)
—	DF	JPN	Yuya Mitsunaga (on loan to (Japan) Azul Claro Numazu)
—	DF	JPN	Masahiro Koga (retired)
—	DF	KOR	Lee Kwang-seon (to (South Korea) Jeju United)
—	MF	JPN	Noriyoshi Sakai (loan return to (Japan) Albirex Niigata)
—	MF	BRA	Moisés Ribeiro Santos (loan return to (Brazil) CA Linense)
—	MF	JPN	Taku Ushinohama (to (Japan) Grulla Morioka)
