= 2014 J.League U-22 Selection season =

J.League U-22 Selection
2014 season
- Manager: Tsutomu Takahata
- J3 League: 10th

2014 J.League U-22 Selection season.

== J3 League ==
Match	Date	Team	Score	Team	Venue	Attendance
1	2014.03.09	FC Ryukyu	3-0	J.League U-22 Selection	Okinawa Athletic Park Stadium	1,517
2	2014.03.16	Fujieda MYFC	2-4	J.League U-22 Selection	Fujieda Soccer Stadium	2,513
3	2014.03.23	Grulla Morioka	6-1	J.League U-22 Selection	Morioka Minami Park Stadium	3,048
4	2014.03.30	Blaublitz Akita	1-2	J.League U-22 Selection	Akita Yabase Playing Field	1,273
5	2014.04.06	YSCC Yokohama	0-2	J.League U-22 Selection	NHK Spring Mitsuzawa Football Stadium	897
6	2014.04.13	Fukushima United FC	0-1	J.League U-22 Selection	Toho Stadium	1,074
7	2014.04.20	Gainare Tottori	1-0	J.League U-22 Selection	Tottori Bank Bird Stadium	2,545
8	2014.04.26	FC Machida Zelvia	4-0	J.League U-22 Selection	Machida Stadium	2,497
9	2014.04.29	SC Sagamihara	0-1	J.League U-22 Selection	Sagamihara Gion Stadium	4,079
10	2014.05.04	AC Nagano Parceiro	1-0	J.League U-22 Selection	Nagano Athletic Stadium	8,011
11	2014.05.11	Zweigen Kanazawa	2-0	J.League U-22 Selection	Ishikawa Athletics Stadium	3,309
12	2014.05.18	Fujieda MYFC	3-1	J.League U-22 Selection	Fujieda Soccer Stadium	1,070
13	2014.05.25	Gainare Tottori	1-0	J.League U-22 Selection	Tottori Bank Bird Stadium	2,338
14	2014.06.01	AC Nagano Parceiro	4-0	J.League U-22 Selection	Saku Athletic Stadium	2,325
15	2014.06.08	FC Ryukyu	0-6	J.League U-22 Selection	Okinawa City Stadium	4,362
16	2014.06.14	Zweigen Kanazawa	0-0	J.League U-22 Selection	Ishikawa Athletics Stadium	1,788
17	2014.06.22	Grulla Morioka	3-1	J.League U-22 Selection	Morioka Minami Park Stadium	1,933
18	2014.07.20	SC Sagamihara	2-3	J.League U-22 Selection	Sagamihara Gion Stadium	4,021
19	2014.07.27	FC Machida Zelvia	1-1	J.League U-22 Selection	Machida Stadium	2,593
20	2014.08.03	Blaublitz Akita	4-0	J.League U-22 Selection	Akita Yabase Playing Field	1,333
21	2014.08.10	Fukushima United FC	0-0	J.League U-22 Selection	Toho Stadium	628
25	2014.08.17	Grulla Morioka	2-1	J.League U-22 Selection	Morioka Minami Park Stadium	817
22	2014.08.24	YSCC Yokohama	2-1	J.League U-22 Selection	NHK Spring Mitsuzawa Football Stadium	815
23	2014.08.31	Fujieda MYFC	2-1	J.League U-22 Selection	Fujieda Soccer Stadium	785
24	2014.09.07	FC Machida Zelvia	3-0	J.League U-22 Selection	Machida Stadium	3,015
27	2014.10.05	AC Nagano Parceiro	5-0	J.League U-22 Selection	Saku Athletic Stadium	1,705
28	2014.10.12	SC Sagamihara	1-5	J.League U-22 Selection	Sagamihara Gion Stadium	2,307
29	2014.10.18	Fukushima United FC	0-0	J.League U-22 Selection	Toho Stadium	811
26	2014.10.26	YSCC Yokohama	1-1	J.League U-22 Selection	Shonan BMW Stadium Hiratsuka	577
30	2014.11.02	FC Ryukyu	4-2	J.League U-22 Selection	Okinawa City Stadium	5,163
31	2014.11.08	Zweigen Kanazawa	3-0	J.League U-22 Selection	Ishikawa Athletics Stadium	4,692
32	2014.11.16	Gainare Tottori	1-2	J.League U-22 Selection	Tottori Bank Bird Stadium	2,740
33	2014.11.23	Blaublitz Akita	1-1	J.League U-22 Selection	Akigin Stadium	2,478
