= Hideyuki Nozawa =

Japanese footballer

Hideyuki Nozawa 野澤 英之
Personal information
- Full name: Hideyuki Nozawa
- Date of birth: 15 August 1994 (age 32)
- Place of birth: Wakō, Saitama, Japan
- Height: 1.80 m (5 ft 11 in)
- Position: Midfielder

Team information
- Current team: Ventforet Kofu
- Number: 6

Youth career
- 2007–2012: FC Tokyo

Senior career*
Years	Team	Apps	(Gls)
2013–2019	FC Tokyo	9	(0)
2014–2015	→ J.League U-22 (loan)	13	(0)
2016	→ FC Tokyo U-23 (loan)	26	(1)
2017	→ FC Gifu (loan)	14	(0)
2018–2019	→ Ehime FC (loan)	57	(2)
2020–	Ventforet Kofu	25	(0)

International career
2011	Japan U17	2	(0)
- * Club domestic league appearances and goals as of 21:24, 12 January 2021 (UTC)

Hideyuki Nozawa (野澤 英之, Nozawa Hideyuki; born 15 August 1994) is a Japanese footballer who plays as a midfielder for Ventforet Kofu.

== Club career ==
=== FC Tokyo ===
Nozawa made his debut for FC Tokyo on 23 March 2013 against Kashima Antlers in the J.League Cup at the Kashima Soccer Stadium in which he started and played 62 minutes before being substituted for Hirotaka Mita as FC Tokyo won the match 4–2.

== International ==
Nozawa participated with the Japan U17s during the 2011 FIFA U-17 World Cup in which he played two matches against Jamaica U17s and the Argentina U17s.

== Career statistics ==
=== Club ===
Updated to end of 2018 season.

Club	Season	League		J. League Cup		Emperor's Cup		AFC		Total	
Club	Season	Apps	Goals	Apps	Goals	Apps	Goals	Apps	Goals	Apps	Goals
FC Tokyo	2013	0	0	1	0	0	0	–		1	0
FC Tokyo	2014	4	0	1	0	0	0	–		5	0
FC Tokyo	2015	3	0	1	0	0	0	–		4	0
FC Tokyo	2016	2	0	0	0	1	0	0	0	3	0
FC Tokyo U-23	2016	26	1	–		–		–		26	1
FC Gifu	2017	14	0	2	0	–		–		16	0
Ehime FC	2018	29	1	1	0	–		–		30	1
Career total		78	2	6	0	1	0	0	0	85	2
