= Koki Oshima =

Japanese footballer

Koki Oshima 大島 康樹
Personal information
- Full name: Koki Oshima
- Date of birth: 30 May 1996 (age 30)
- Place of birth: Shizuoka, Japan
- Height: 1.77 m (5 ft 10 in)
- Position: Forward

Team information
- Current team: Ventforet Kofu
- Number: 29

Youth career
- 2006–2014: Kashiwa Reysol

Senior career*
Years	Team	Apps	(Gls)
2014–2017	Kashiwa Reysol	3	(0)
2015	→ J. League U-22 (loan)	12	(1)
2016	→ Kataller Toyama (loan)	5	(1)
2018–2024	Tochigi SC	167	(15)
2018	→ Thespakusatsu Gunma (loan)	29	(10)
2025–	Ventforet Kofu	49	(2)
- * Club domestic league appearances and goals as of 17 August 2026

Koki Oshima (大島 康樹, born 30 May 1996 in Shizuoka, Japan) is a Japanese footballer who plays for Ventforet Kofu.

== Career ==
=== Kashiwa Reysol ===
Oshima made his official debut for Kashiwa Reysol in the J. League Division 1, J. League Cup on 9 October 2014 against Sanfrecce Hiroshima in Hiroshima Big Arch in Hiroshima, Japan. In the 72nd minute Oshima subbed in for Leandro. Oshima and his club lost the match 2–0.

== Club statistics ==
Updated to 23 February 2018.

Appearances and goals by club, season and competition
Club	Season	League			Emperor's Cup		J. League Cup		AFC		Total	
Club	Season	Division	Apps	Goals	Apps	Goals	Apps	Goals	Apps	Goals	Apps	Goals
Kashiwa Reysol	2014	J1 League	1	0	1	1	1	0	–		3	1
Kashiwa Reysol	2015	J1 League	1	0	0	0	1	0	1	0	3	0
Kashiwa Reysol	2016	J1 League	1	0	0	0	0	0	0	0	1	0
Kataller Toyama	2016	J3 League	5	1	1	0	–		–		6	1
Kashiwa Reysol	2017	J1 League	0	0	1	0	4	0	–		5	0
Total			7	1	3	1	6	0	1	0	17	2
