= Tasuku Hiraoka =

Japanese footballer

Tasuku Hiraoka 平岡翼
Personal information
- Full name: Tasuku Hiraoka
- Date of birth: February 23, 1996 (age 30)
- Place of birth: Kashihara, Nara, Japan
- Height: 1.65 m (5 ft 5 in)
- Position: Midfielder

Team information
- Current team: Tochigi SC
- Number: 11

Youth career
- 2011–2013: Sakuyo High School

Senior career*
Years	Team	Apps	(Gls)
2014–2018	FC Tokyo	0	(0)
2014–2015	→ J. League U-22 (loan)	22	(5)
2016–2018	→ FC Tokyo U-23 (loan)	57	(8)
2019–	Tochigi SC		
- * Club domestic league appearances and goals as of 6 January 2019

Tasuku Hiraoka (平岡 翼, Hiraoka Tasuku; born February 23, 1996 in Nara) is a Japanese football player. He plays for Tochigi SC.

== Playing career ==
Tasuku Hiraoka joined to J1 League club FC Tokyo in 2014.

== Career statistics ==
Updated to 23 February 2018.

Club	Season	League		Emperor's Cup		J. League Cup		AFC		Total	
Club	Season	Apps	Goals	Apps	Goals	Apps	Goals	Apps	Goals	Apps	Goals
FC Tokyo	2014	0	0	0	0	0	0	–		0	0
FC Tokyo	2015	0	0	0	0	0	0	–		0	0
FC Tokyo	2016	0	0	0	0	0	0	0	0	0	0
FC Tokyo U-23	2016	28	1	–		–		–		28	1
FC Tokyo	2017	0	0	0	0	0	0	–		0	0
FC Tokyo U-23	2017	0	0	–		–		–		0	0
Career total		28	1	0	0	0	0	0	0	28	1
