= Daiki Kogure =

Japanese footballer

Daiki Kogure 小暮 大器
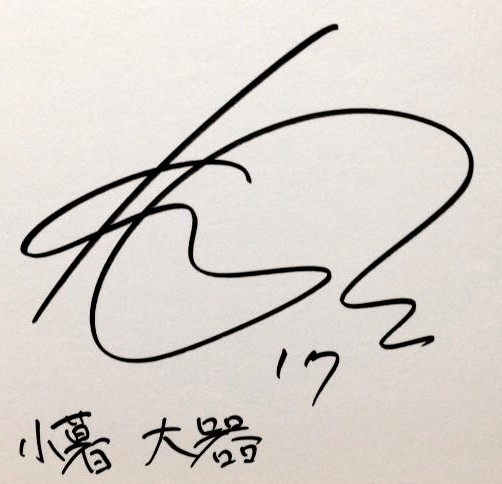

Personal information
- Full name: Daiki Kogure
- Date of birth: May 17, 1994 (age 32)
- Place of birth: Ryūgasaki, Ibaraki, Japan
- Height: 1.74 m (5 ft 8 1/2 in)
- Position: Midfielder

Team information
- Current team: Iwate Grulla Morioka
- Number: 13

Youth career
- 2010–2012: Cerezo Osaka

Senior career*
Years	Team	Apps	(Gls)
2013–2016	Cerezo Osaka	6	(0)
2014	→ Tokushima Vortis (loan)	13	(0)
2014–2015	→ J. League U-22 (loan)	6	(0)
2016	→ Cerezo Osaka U-23 (loan)	27	(0)
2017–2021	Ehime FC	124	(1)
2022–2024	Blaublitz Akita	44	(2)
2024-	Iwate Grulla Morioka	22	(0)
- * Club domestic league appearances and goals as of 3 August 2024 @ 12:30(AEST)

Daiki Kogure (小暮 大器, Kogure Daiki; born May 17, 1994 in Ryūgasaki, Ibaraki) is a Japanese footballer who plays as a midfielder for J3 League club Iwate Grulla Morioka.

== Club statistics ==
Updated to 25 November 2022.

Club performance			League		Cup		League Cup		Total	
Season	Club	League	Apps	Goals	Apps	Goals	Apps	Goals	Apps	Goals
Japan			League		Emperor's Cup		J. League Cup		Total	
2013	Cerezo Osaka	J1 League	3	0	2	0	0	0	5	0
2014	Tokushima Vortis	J1 League	13	0	2	0	4	1	19	1
2015	Cerezo Osaka	J2 League	3	0	1	0	–		4	0
2016	Cerezo Osaka	J2 League	0	0	0	0	–		0	0
2016	Cerezo Osaka U-23	J3 League	27	0	–		–		27	0
2017	Ehime FC	J2 League	32	1	2	0	–		34	1
2018	Ehime FC	J2 League	37	0	1	0	–		38	0
2019	Ehime FC	J2 League	3	0	1	0	–		4	0
2020	Ehime FC	J2 League	22	0	–		–		22	0
2021	Ehime FC	J2 League	30	0	1	0	–		31	0
2022	Blaublitz Akita	J2 League	29	1	1	1	–		30	3
2023	Blaublitz Akita	J2 League	0	0	0	0	–		0	0
Career total			199	3	11	1	4	1	214	5
