= Ryuolivier Iwamoto =

Japanese footballer

Personal information
- Date of birth: April 3, 1996 (age 30)
- Place of birth: Kagoshima, Japan
- Height: 1.83 m (6 ft 0 in)
- Position: Forward

Youth career
- 2009–2013: Kyoto Sanga
- 2014–2015: Kagoshima Jōsei High School

Senior career*
Years	Team	Apps	(Gls)
2015–2017	Júbilo Iwata	0	(0)
2015	→ J.League U-22 Selection (loan)	12	(0)
2016	→ Vanraure Hachinohe (loan)	8	(1)
2017	→ Gainare Tottori (loan)	24	(4)
Total		44	(5)
- * Club domestic league appearances and goals

Ryuolivier Iwamoto (岩元 颯オリビエ, Iwamoto Ryuolivier; born April 3, 1996) is a Japanese former professional footballer who played as a forward.

After his football career, Iwamoto went to university, and started working as a banker.

== Career ==
Iwamoto joined Kyoto Sanga's U15 team, and won the top scorer award at the 2010 U-15 All Japan Youth Championship. After joined Kyoto Sanga U18s, he decided to move to Kagoshima Jōsei High School, where he was scouted by Júbilo Iwata. During his time with Kyoto Sanga, he honed his footwork skills. He joined Júbilo Iwata on 20 October 2014, joining the team from the 2015 season. Iwamoto moved into the Júbilo Iwata dormitory, bringing along a picture of himself with Japan international Atsushi Yanagisawa. Iwamoto was loaned out to JFL side Vanraure Hachinohe on 2 September 2016.

He was loaned out to Gainare Tottori on 5 January 2017 on a development-type loan. He played 24 league matches and scored 3 goals during his time at Gainare Tottori. Although there was speculation he would be loaned out again in the 2018 season, Iwamoto decided to retire at the end of the 2017 season.

== After football ==
After retiring, Iwamoto enrolled at Hosei University. During his third year at university, he worked with Real Tech Fund, a venture capital firm.

In April 2022, Iwamoto began working at an investment bank.

== Personal life ==
Iwamoto's father was a doctor who worked for Doctors Without Borders, and his mother was a member of the Japan Overseas Cooperation Volunteers. His mother chose the name "Olivier" from the name Olive, the symbolic tree of the United Nations, and added the name Haya to ensure that "he would become a gentle wind of peace that would blow through the world".

== Career statistics ==
Updated to 23 February 2017.

Appearances and goals by club, season and competition
Club	Season	League			Emperor's Cup		J.League Cup		Total	
Club	Season	Division	Apps	Goals	Apps	Goals	Apps	Goals	Apps	Goals
Júbilo Iwata	2015	J2 League	0	0	0	0	–		0	0
Júbilo Iwata	2016	J1 League	0	0	0	0	0	0	0	0
Vanraure Hachinohe	2016	JFL	8	1	–		–		8	1
Career total			8	1	0	0	0	0	8	1
