= Tanimura =

Tanimura (written: 谷村) is a Japanese surname. Notable people with the surname include:

- Aya Tanimura, Australian writer and director
- George Tanimura, (born 1915), Japanese-American agriculture leader
- Isao Tanimura, Japanese mixed martial artist
- Kaina Tanimura (谷村 海那, born 1998), Japanese footballer
- Kenichi Tanimura (谷村 憲一, born 1995), Japanese footballer
- Mitsuki Tanimura (谷村 美月, born 1990), Japanese actress
- Nana Tanimura (谷村 奈南, born 1987), Japanese pop singer
- Shinji Tanimura (谷村 新司, 1948–2023), Japanese singer-songwriter
- Yoshitaka Tanimura (谷村 吉隆, born 1960), Japanese mathematical physicist
