= Tsubasa Nihei =

Japanese footballer

Personal information
- Date of birth: September 10, 1994 (age 32)
- Place of birth: Chiba, Japan
- Height: 1.67 m (5 ft 5 1/2 in)
- Position: Midfielder

Team information
- Current team: Vonds Ichihara
- Number: 15

Youth career
- 2010–2012: FC Tokyo

Senior career*
Years	Team	Apps	(Gls)
2013–2014	Mito HollyHock	5	(0)
2014	→J.League U-22 Selection (loan)	3	(0)
2015–	Vonds Ichihara	30	(15)
- * Club domestic league appearances and goals as of 20 February 2017

Tsubasa Nihei (二瓶 翼, Nihei Tsubasa; born September 10, 1994) is a Japanese football player.

== Playing career ==
Tsubasa Nihei played for J2 League club; Mito HollyHock from 2013 to 2014.

== Club statistics ==
Updated to 20 February 2017.

Club performance			League		Cup		Total	
Season	Club	League	Apps	Goals	Apps	Goals	Apps	Goals
Japan			League		Emperor's Cup		Total	
2013	Mito HollyHock	J2 League	4	0	-		4	0
2014	Mito HollyHock	J2 League	1	0	-		1	0
2014	J.League U-22 Selection	J3 League	3	0	-		3	0
2015	Vonds Ichihara	JRL (Kanto, Div. 1)	12	5	-		12	5
2016	Vonds Ichihara	JRL (Kanto, Div. 1)	18	10	1	1	19	11
Career total			38	15	1	1	39	16
