= Shinnosuke Hatanaka =

Japanese footballer

Shinnosuke Hatanaka 畠中 槙之輔
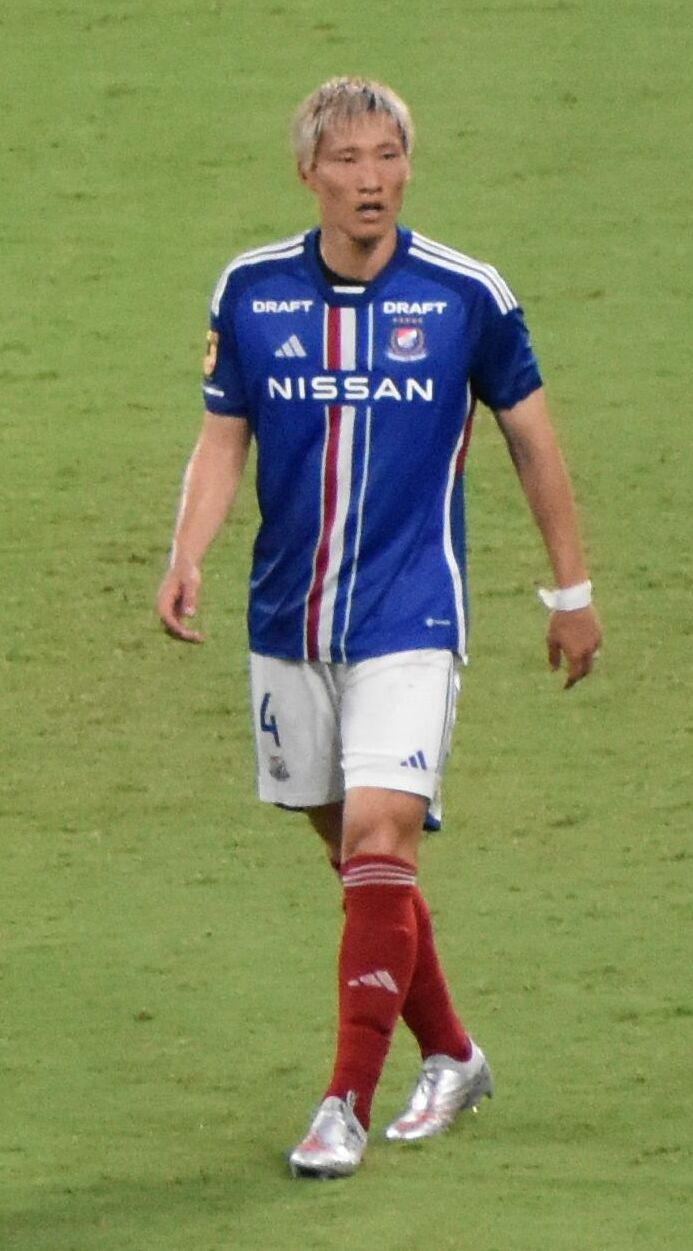

Personal information
- Full name: Shinnosuke Hatanaka
- Date of birth: 25 August 1995 (age 31)
- Place of birth: Yokohama, Kanagawa, Japan
- Height: 1.84 m (6 ft 0 in)
- Position: Centre back

Team information
- Current team: Cerezo Osaka
- Number: 44

Youth career
- 2002–2004: Yokohama Sumire SC
- 2005–2013: Tokyo Verdy

Senior career*
Years	Team	Apps	(Gls)
2014–2018	Tokyo Verdy	62	(4)
2014–2015	→ J. League U-22 (loan)	4	(0)
2016	→ FC Machida Zelvia (loan)	29	(1)
2018–2024	Yokohama F. Marinos	145	(3)
2025–	Cerezo Osaka	52	(0)

International career^{‡}
2019–	Japan	10	(0)
Medal record
Yokohama F. Marinos
Runner-up	J.League Cup	2018
Men's football
Representing Japan
EAFF Championship
Winner	2022 Japan	Team
Runner-up	2019 South Korea	Team
- * Club domestic league appearances and goals as of 10 August 2026 ‡ National team caps and goals as of 27 July 2022

Shinnosuke Hatanaka (畠中 槙之輔, Hatanaka Shinnosuke; born 25 August 1995) is a Japanese footballer who plays for J1 League club, Cerezo Osaka and the Japan national team.

== International ==
He made his debut for the Japan national football team on 26 March 2019 in a friendly against Bolivia, as a starter.

== Career statistics ==
=== Club ===
As of match played 8 December 2024.

Club	Season	League			Cup		League Cup		Continental		Other		Total	
Club	Season	Division	Apps	Goals	Apps	Goals	Apps	Goals	Apps	Goals	Apps	Goals	Apps	Goals
Tokyo Verdy	2014	J2 League	2	0	0	0	—		—		—		2	0
Tokyo Verdy	2015	J2 League	4	0	1	1	—		—		—		5	1
Tokyo Verdy	2017	J2 League	28	2	1	0	—		—		—		28	2
Tokyo Verdy	2018	J2 League	28	2	0	0	—		—		—		28	2
Tokyo Verdy	Total		62	4	2	1	—		—		—		64	5
Machida Zelvia (loan)	2016	J2 League	29	1	1	0	—		—		—		30	1
Yokohama F. Marinos	2018	J1 League	5	0	1	1	1	0	—		—		7	1
Yokohama F. Marinos	2019	J1 League	34	0	1	0	4	0	—		—		39	0
Yokohama F. Marinos	2020	J1 League	25	2	—		2	0	4	0	1	0	32	2
Yokohama F. Marinos	2021	J1 League	26	0	0	0	2	0	—		—		28	0
Yokohama F. Marinos	2022	J1 League	16	0	1	0	2	0	5	1	—		24	1
Yokohama F. Marinos	2023	J1 League	24	0	1	0	1	0	0	0	1	0	27	0
Yokohama F. Marinos	2024	J1 League	15	1	1	0	2	0	4	0	—		22	1
Yokohama F. Marinos	Total		145	3	5	1	14	0	13	1	2	0	179	5
Career total			236	8	8	2	14	0	13	1	2	0	273	11

== National team statistics ==
Japan national team
Year	Apps	Goals
2019	7	0
Total	7	0

== Honours ==
=== Club ===
Yokohama F. Marinos

- J1 League (2): 2019, 2022

=== International ===
- EAFF Championship: 2022
