= Yuto Nagasaka =

Japanese footballer

Yuto Nagasaka 永坂勇人
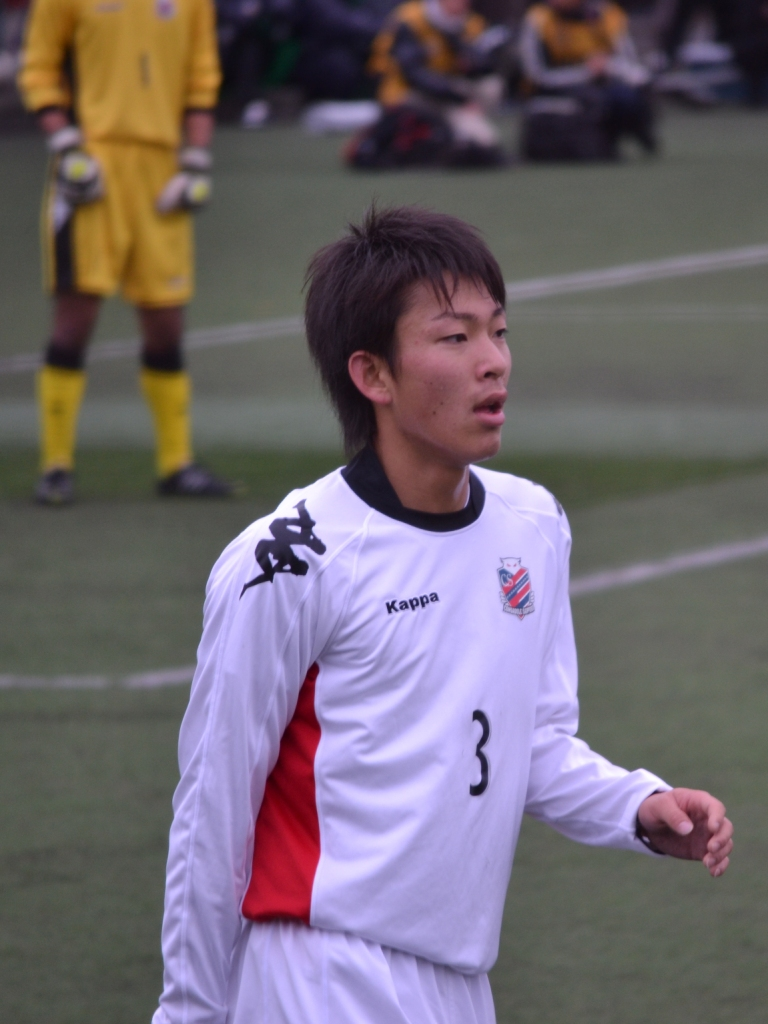

Personal information
- Full name: Yuto Nagasaka
- Date of birth: May 22, 1994 (age 32)
- Place of birth: Sapporo, Japan
- Height: 1.86 m (6 ft 1 in)
- Position: Centre back

Team information
- Current team: Hokkaido Tokachi Sky Earth

Youth career
- Masaka SSS
- –2012: Consadole Sapporo

Senior career*
Years	Team	Apps	(Gls)
2013–2018	Hokkaido Consadole Sapporo	5	(0)
2013	→ Khonkaen FC (loan)	5	(0)
2014–2015	→ J. League U-22 (loan)	7	(0)
2017–2018	→ Mito HollyHock (loan)	1	(0)
2019–	Hokkaido Tokachi Sky Earth		
- * Club domestic league appearances and goals as of 2 January 2019

Yuto Nagasaka (永坂 勇人, Nagasaka Yuto; born May 22, 1994) is a Japanese football player from Hokkaido Consadole Sapporo.

== Career ==
On 26 July 2019, Nagasaka joined Hokkaido Tokachi Sky Earth.

== Club statistics ==
Updated to 23 February 2018.

Club performance			League		Cup		League Cup		Total	
Season	Club	League	Apps	Goals	Apps	Goals	Apps	Goals	Apps	Goals
Country			League		Emperor's Cup		J. League Cup		Total	
2013	Consadole Sapporo	J2 League	0	0	0	0	–		0	0
2013	Khonkaen FC	TL1	5	0	–		–		5	0
2014	Consadole Sapporo	J2 League	0	0	0	0	–		0	0
2015	Consadole Sapporo	J2 League	2	0	2	0	–		4	0
2016	Hokkaido Consadole Sapporo	J2 League	3	0	2	0	–		5	0
2017	Hokkaido Consadole Sapporo	J1 League	0	0	1	0	4	0	5	0
2017	Mito HollyHock	J2 League	0	0	–		–		0	0
Career total			10	0	5	0	4	0	19	0
