= Keita Fujimura =

Japanese footballer

Keita Fujimura 藤村 慶太
Personal information
- Full name: Keita Fujimura
- Date of birth: September 2, 1993 (age 33)
- Place of birth: Morioka, Iwate, Japan
- Height: 1.82 m (5 ft 11 1/2 in)
- Position: Midfielder

Team information
- Current team: Kagoshima United
- Number: 8

Youth career
- 2009–2011: Morioka Shogyo High School

Senior career*
Years	Team	Apps	(Gls)
2012–2018	Vegalta Sendai	33	(0)
2014–2015	→ J.League U-22 (loan)	7	(0)
2018	→ Zweigen Kanazawa (loan)	37	(1)
2019–24	Zweigen Kanazawa	243	(8)
2024-	Kagoshima United	68	(2)
Medal record
Vegalta Sendai
Runner-up	J1 League	2012
- * Club domestic league appearances and goals as of 18 August 2026

Keita Fujimura (藤村 慶太, Fujimura Keita; born September 2, 1993 in Iwate) is a Japanese football player. He plays for Kagoshima United.

== Career statistics ==
Updated to end of 2018 season.

Appearances and goals by club, season and competition
Club	Season	League			Emperor's Cup		J.League Cup		Total	
Club	Season	Division	Apps	Goals	Apps	Goals	Apps	Goals	Apps	Goals
Vegalta Sendai	2012	J1 League	0	0	0	0	0	0	0	0
Vegalta Sendai	2013	J1 League	0	0	1	0	0	0	1	0
Vegalta Sendai	2014	J1 League	0	0	0	0	1	1	1	1
Vegalta Sendai	2015	J1 League	5	0	3	0	3	0	11	0
Vegalta Sendai	2016	J1 League	25	0	1	0	5	0	31	0
Vegalta Sendai	2017	J1 League	3	0	1	0	7	0	11	0
Zweigen Kanazawa	2018	J2 League	37	1	2	0	-		39	1
Career total			70	1	6	0	16	1	94	2
