= Keisuke Oyama =

Japanese footballer (born 1995)

Keisuke Oyama 大山 啓輔
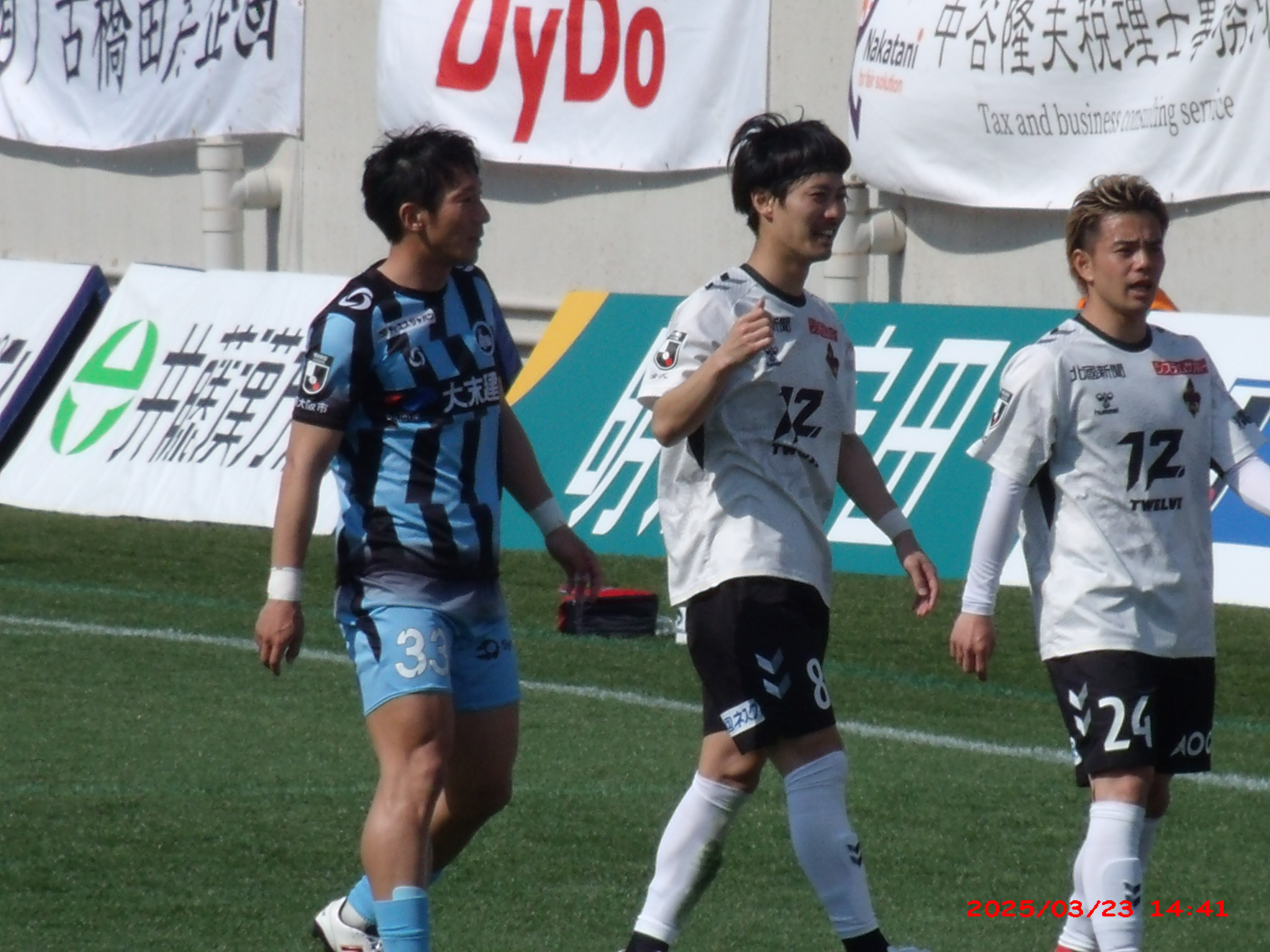
- From left: Woo Sang-ho (FC Osaka), Keisuke Oyama and Nishitani Kazuki (Tsegen Kanazawa) (March 2025, Hanazono Rugby Stadium Main Stadium, Higashiosaka City, J3 League)

Personal information
- Full name: Keisuke Oyama
- Date of birth: 7 May 1995 (age 31)
- Place of birth: Saitama, Japan
- Height: 1.74 m (5 ft 9 in)
- Position: Midfielder

Team information
- Current team: Zweigen Kanazawa
- Number: 8

Youth career
- 2008–2013: Omiya Ardija

Senior career*
Years	Team	Apps	(Gls)
2014–2023	Omiya Ardija	188	(2)
2014–2015	→ J.League U-22 (loan)	13	(1)
2024–	Zweigen Kanazawa	64	(2)
- * Club domestic league appearances and goals as of 21 August 2026

Keisuke Oyama (大山 啓輔, Ōyama Keisuke; born 7 May 1995 in Saitama) is a Japanese footballer who plays for Zweigen Kanazawa.

== Club statistics ==
Updated to end of 2018 season.

Appearances and goals by club, season and competition
Club	Season	League			Emperor's Cup		J. League Cup		Total	
Club	Season	Division	Apps	Goals	Apps	Goals	Apps	Goals	Apps	Goals
Omiya Ardija	2014	J1 League	0	0	2	0	1	0	3	0
Omiya Ardija	2015	J2 League	13	0	2	0	–		15	0
Omiya Ardija	2016	J1 League	10	0	5	1	6	1	21	2
Omiya Ardija	2017	J1 League	25	0	1	0	5	0	31	0
Omiya Ardija	2018	J2 League	38	1	1	0	–		39	1
Career total			86	1	11	1	12	1	109	3
