= Naoki Otani =

Japanese footballer

Naoki Otani 大谷 尚輝
Personal information
- Full name: Naoki Otani
- Date of birth: 24 September 1995 (age 31)
- Place of birth: Fuchū, Hiroshima, Japan
- Height: 1.83 m (6 ft 0 in)
- Position: Defender

Team information
- Current team: Tochigi SC
- Number: 15

Youth career
- 2007–2013: Sanfrecce Hiroshima Youth

Senior career*
Years	Team	Apps	(Gls)
2014–2017	Sanfrecce Hiroshima	0	(0)
2015	→ Roasso Kumamoto (loan)	5	(0)
2014–2015	→ J. League U-22 (loan)	6	(0)
2016–2017	→ Machida Zelvia (loan)	31	(2)
2018–2021	Machida Zelvia	60	(4)
2021	→ Ehime FC (loan)	17	(0)
2022–	Tochigi SC	16	(0)
Medal record
Sanfrecce Hiroshima
Runner-up	J.League Cup	2014
- * Club domestic league appearances and goals as of 21 August 2022

Naoki Otani (大谷 尚輝, Ōtani Naoki; born 24 September 1995) is a Japanese footballer who plays for Tochigi SC.

== Club statistics ==
Updated to end of 2018 season.

Club performance			League		Cup		League Cup		Continental		Total	
Season	Club	League	Apps	Goals	Apps	Goals	Apps	Goals	Apps	Goals	Apps	Goals
Japan			League		Emperor's Cup		J. League Cup		AFC		Total	
2014	Sanfrecce Hiroshima	J1 League	0	0	0	0	0	0	0	0	0	0
2015	Roasso Kumamoto	J2 League	5	0	1	0	–		–		6	0
2016	Sanfrecce Hiroshima	J1 League	0	0	0	0	0	0	1	0	1	0
2016	Machida Zelvia	J2 League	6	0	–		–		–		6	0
2017	Machida Zelvia	J2 League	25	2	1	0	–		–		26	2
2018	Machida Zelvia	J2 League	37	3	2	0	–		–		39	3
Career total			73	5	4	0	0	0	1	0	78	5
