= Kazuki Mine =

Japanese footballer

Personal information
- Date of birth: April 18, 1993 (age 33)
- Place of birth: Osaka, Japan
- Height: 1.90 m (6 ft 3 in)
- Position: Forward

Team information
- Current team: Vanraure Hachinohe
- Number: 20

Youth career
- 2009–2011: Kyoto Sanga

Senior career*
Years	Team	Apps	(Gls)
2012–2016	Kyoto Sanga FC	4	(0)
2013	→ Kataller Toyama (loan)	13	(2)
2014	→ Nagano Parceiro (loan)	1	(0)
2014–2015	→ J.League U-22 Selection (loan)	15	(4)
2016	Albirex Niigata Singapore	27	(0)
2017–2018	Vanraure Hachinohe	9	(1)
- * Club domestic league appearances and goals

Kazuki Mine (三根 和起, Mine Kazuki; born April 18, 1993) is a Japanese football player. He retired in February of 2018 after making over 50 career appearances. He began his career at Kyoto Sanga FC, before leaving on loan 3 times to play for Kataller Toyama, AC Nagano Parceiro, and J.League U-22 Selection, before moving permanently to Albirex Niigata Singapore F.C. where he would play 27 times. He finished his career in 2018 at the 5th club of his career, Vanraure Hachinohe.

== Club statistics ==
Updated to 27 April, 2025.

Club performance			League		Cup		Total	
Season	Club	League	Apps	Goals	Apps	Goals	Apps	Goals
Japan			League		Emperor's Cup		Total	
2012	Kyoto Sanga	J2 League	2	0	0	0	2	0
2013	Kataller Toyama	J2 League	13	2	0	0	13	2
2014	Nagano Parceiro	J3 League	1	0	–		1	0
2014	Kyoto Sanga	J2 League	0	0	0	0	0	0
2015	Kyoto Sanga	J2 League	2	0	0	0	2	0
2016	Albirex Niigata Singapore FC	S.League	23	0	9	0	32	0
2017	Vanraure Hachinohe	Japan Football League	7	0	2	1	9	1
Total			48	2	11	1	59	3
