= Ryuta Miyauchi =

Japanese footballer

Personal information
- Full name: Ryuta Miyauchi
- Date of birth: March 2, 1994 (age 32)
- Place of birth: Chiba, Japan
- Height: 1.70 m (5 ft 7 in)
- Position: Midfielder

Youth career
- 2009–2011: Kashima Antlers

Senior career*
Years	Team	Apps	(Gls)
2012–2014	Kashima Antlers	0	(0)
2014	→J.League U-22 (loan)	10	(0)
Total		10	(0)
Medal record
Kashima Antlers
Winner	J.League Cup	2012
- * Club domestic league appearances and goals

Ryuta Miyauchi (宮内 龍汰, Miyauchi Ryūta; born March 2, 1994) is a former Japanese football player.

== Playing career ==
Ryuta Miyauchi played for J1 League club; Kashima Antlers from 2012 to 2014.
