= Tatsuya Wada =

Japanese footballer (born 1994)

Personal information
- Date of birth: June 21, 1994 (age 32)
- Place of birth: Osaka, Japan
- Height: 1.64 m (5 ft 4 1/2 in)
- Position: Midfielder

Team information
- Current team: Tochigi SC
- Number: 24

Youth career
- 2010–2012: Kokoku High School

Senior career*
Years	Team	Apps	(Gls)
2013–2015	Matsumoto Yamaga FC	1	(0)
2014–2015	→ J.League U-22 Selection (loan)	33	(1)
2016–	Tochigi SC	57	(2)
- * Club domestic league appearances and goals as of 2 January 2019

Tatsuya Wada (和田 達也, Wada Tatsuya; born June 21, 1994 in Osaka) is a Japanese football player for Tochigi SC.

== Club statistics ==
Updated to 23 February 2017.

Club performance			League		Cup		League Cup		Total	
Season	Club	League	Apps	Goals	Apps	Goals	Apps	Goals	Apps	Goals
Japan			League		Emperor's Cup		J. League Cup		Total	
2013	Matsumoto Yamaga	J2 League	0	0	0	0	–		0	0
2014	Matsumoto Yamaga	J2 League	1	0	0	0	–		1	0
2015	Matsumoto Yamaga	J1 League	0	0	0	0	2	0	2	0
2016	Tochigi SC	J3 League	0	0	0	0	–		0	0
Career total			1	0	0	0	2	0	3	0
