= Naoya Fuji =

Japanese footballer

Personal information
- Full name: Naoya Fuji
- Date of birth: May 31, 1993 (age 33)
- Place of birth: Ehime, Japan
- Height: 1.70 m (5 ft 7 in)
- Position: Midfielder

Youth career
- –2011: Ehime FC Youth

Senior career*
Years	Team	Apps	(Gls)
2012–	Ehime FC	38	(3)
2014	→ J.League U-22 Selection (loan)	1	(0)
2017	Niisho Club		
- Lvenirosso Niihama Club
- * Club domestic league appearances and goals as of 01:34, 20 January 2024

Naoya Fuji (藤 直也, Fuji Naoya; born May 31, 1993) is a Japanese former football player.

== Early life ==
Naoya was born in Ehime. He played for Ehime FC.

== Career ==
Naoya scored on his debut for Ehime, scoring against Roasso Kumamoto in the 90th+3rd minute after being brought on as a substitute.

== Club statistics ==
Updated to 23 February 2016.

Club performance			League		Cup		Total	
Season	Club	League	Apps	Goals	Apps	Goals	Apps	Goals
Japan			League		Emperor's Cup		Total	
2012	Ehime FC	J2 League	1	1	0	0	1	1
2013	Ehime FC	J2 League	3	0	1	0	4	0
2014	Ehime FC	J2 League	26	2	1	0	27	2
2015	Ehime FC	J2 League	7	0	1	0	8	0
Total			37	3	3	0	40	3
