= Yosuke Tashiro =

Japanese footballer

Personal information
- Full name: Yosuke Tashiro
- Date of birth: June 27, 1995 (age 31)
- Place of birth: Osaka City, Japan
- Height: 1.72 m (5 ft 7 1/2 in)
- Position: Forward

Team information
- Current team: Thespakusatsu Gunma
- Number: 33

Youth career
- 2011–2013: Kokoku High School

Senior career*
Years	Team	Apps	(Gls)
2014–2016	Vissel Kobe	6	(0)
2015	→J.League U-22 selection (loan)	1	(0)
2016–	Thespakusatsu Gunma		
- * Club domestic league appearances and goals as of 23 February 2016

Yosuke Tashiro (田代 容輔, Tashiro Yosuke; born June 27, 1995 in Osaka) is a Japanese football player for Thespakusatsu Gunma.

== Career statistics ==
Updated to 23 February 2016.

Appearances and goals by club, season and competition
Club	Season	League			Emperor's Cup		J.League Cup		Total	
Club	Season	Division	Apps	Goals	Apps	Goals	Apps	Goals	Apps	Goals
Vissel Kobe	2014	J1 League	0	0	0	0	0	0	0	0
Vissel Kobe	2015	J1 League	6	0	0	0	2	0	8	0
Career total			6	0	0	0	2	0	8	0
