= Yosei Otsu =

Japanese footballer

Yosei Otsu 大津 耀誠
Personal information
- Full name: Yosei Otsu
- Date of birth: August 7, 1995 (age 31)
- Place of birth: Osaka, Japan
- Height: 1.87 m (6 ft 1 1/2 in)
- Position: Forward

Team information
- Current team: Nara Club
- Number: 13

Youth career
- 2008–2013: Cerezo Osaka Youth

Senior career*
Years	Team	Apps	(Gls)
2014–2016	Thespakusatsu Gunma	16	(1)
2014–2015	→ J. League U-22 (loan)	14	(1)
2016	→ Oita Trinita (loan)	9	(1)
2017	Oita Trinita	5	(3)
2018	SC Sagamihara	6	(0)
2018–	Nara Club	8	(0)
- * Club domestic league appearances and goals as of 18 November 2018

Yosei Otsu (大津 耀誠, Otsu Yosei; born August 7, 1995 in Osaka) is a Japanese football player for Nara Club.

== Playing career ==
Yosei Otsu joined to J2 League club; Thespakusatsu Gunma in 2014. In 2016, he moved to J3 League club; Oita Trinita. I

== Club statistics ==
Updated to 18 November 2018.

Club performance			League		Cup		Total	
Season	Club	League	Apps	Goals	Apps	Goals	Apps	Goals
Japan			League		Emperor's Cup		Total	
2014	Thespakusatsu Gunma	J2 League	10	1	1	0	11	1
2015	Thespakusatsu Gunma	J2 League	6	0	1	1	7	1
2016	Oita Trinita	J3 League	9	1	0	0	9	1
2017	Oita Trinita	J2 League	5	3	0	0	5	3
2018	SC Sagamihara	J3 League	6	0	0	0	6	0
2018	Nara Club	JFL	8	0	0	0	8	0
2019	Nara Club	JFL						
Career total			44	5	2	1	46	6
