= Daiki Yagishita =

Japanese footballer (born 1995)

Daiki Yagishita 柳下 大樹
Personal information
- Full name: Daiki Yagishita
- Date of birth: August 9, 1995 (age 31)
- Place of birth: Saitama, Japan
- Height: 1.80 m (5 ft 11 in)
- Position: Forward

Team information
- Current team: Vanraure Hachinohe
- Number: 29

Youth career
- Takashimadaira SC
- –2010: Urawa Red Diamonds
- 2011–2013: Teikyo High School

Senior career*
Years	Team	Apps	(Gls)
2014–2016	Matsumoto Yamaga FC	3	(0)
2014–2015	→ J. League U-22 (loan)	22	(2)
2017–2024	Kataller Toyama	137	(14)
2024-	Vanraure Hachinohe	33	(3)
- * Club domestic league appearances and goals as of 1 January 2026

Daiki Yagishita (柳下 大樹, Yagishita Daiki; born August 9, 1995 in Saitama) is a Japanese football player for Vanraure Hachinohe.

== Career statistics ==
Updated to 23 February 2020.

Appearances and goals by club, season and competition
Club	Season	League			Emperor's Cup		J.League Cup		Total	
Club	Season	Division	Apps	Goals	Apps	Goals	Apps	Goals	Apps	Goals
Matsumoto Yamaga FC	2014	J2 League	3	0	0	0	–		3	0
Matsumoto Yamaga FC	2015	J1 League	0	0	0	0	0	0	0	0
Matsumoto Yamaga FC	2016	J2 League	0	0	2	0	–		2	0
Kataller Toyama	2017	J3 League	14	2	1	0	–		15	2
Kataller Toyama	2018	J3 League	16	2	2	0	–		18	2
Kataller Toyama	2019	J3 League	27	3	3	0	–		30	3
Career total			60	7	8	0	0	0	68	7
