= Genki Yamada =

Japanese footballer

Genki Yamada 山田 元気
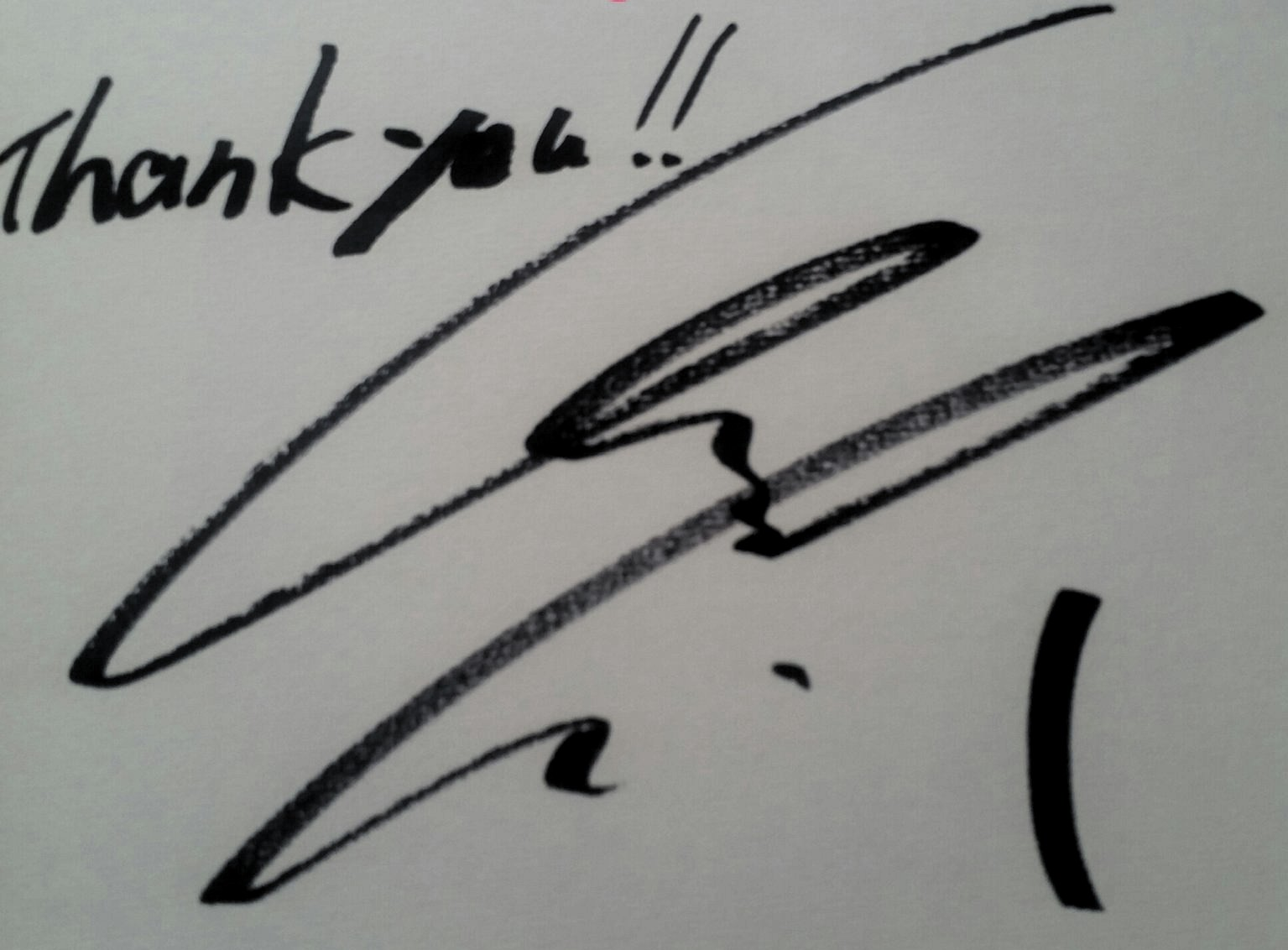

Personal information
- Full name: Genki Yamada
- Date of birth: December 16, 1994 (age 31)
- Place of birth: Nakatsugawa, Gifu, Japan
- Height: 1.87 m (6 ft 1 1/2 in)
- Position: Goalkeeper

Team information
- Current team: Blaublitz Akita
- Number: 1

Youth career
- –2009: FC XEBEC
- 2010–2012: Kyoto Sanga FC

Senior career*
Years	Team	Apps	(Gls)
2013–2018	Kyoto Sanga FC	15	(0)
2014–2015	→ J.League U-22 (loan)	8	(0)
2017–2018	→ Renofa Yamaguchi (loan)	21	(0)
2019–2022	Renofa Yamaguchi	32	(0)
2022	→ Kataller Toyama (loan)	26	(0)
2023–	Blaublitz Akita	72	(0)

International career
2009-2010	Japan U17		
- * Club domestic league appearances and goals as of 14 August 2026

Genki Yamada (山田 元気, Yamada Genki; born December 16, 1994 in Gifu) is a Japanese professional footballer who plays as a goalkeeper for J2 League club Blaublitz Akita.

== Career ==
On 27 December 2016, Yamada was announced at Renofa Yamaguchi on a one year loan.

On 14 December 2018, Yamada was announced at Renofa Yamaguchi on a permanent transfer. On 26 December 2020, the club announced that he had extended his contract for the 2021 season, and that he had undergone surgery after getting injured.

On 14 December 2022, Yamada was announced at Blaublitz Akita on a permanent transfer.

== International career ==
On 14 December 2015, Yamada was part of a 50-player provisional squad for the AFC U-23 Championship Qatar 2016.

== Club statistics ==
As of 20 March 2026.

Appearances and goals by club, season and competition
Club	Season	League			National cup (Note: Includes Emperors Cup)		League cup (Note: Includes J.League Cup)		Total	
Club	Season	Division	Apps	Goals	Apps	Goals	Apps	Goals	Apps	Goals
Kyoto Sanga F.C.	2014	J.League Division 2	0	0	0	0	–		0	0
Kyoto Sanga F.C.	2015	J2 League	15	0	0	0	–		15	0
Kyoto Sanga F.C.	2016	J2 League	0	0	0	0	–		0	0
Kyoto Sanga F.C.	Total		15	0	0	0	0	0	15	0
J.League U-22 Selection (loan)	2014	J3 League	4	0	–		–		4	0
J.League U-22 Selection (loan)	2015	J3 League	4	0	–		–		4	0
J.League U-22 Selection (loan)	Total		8	0	0	0	0	0	8	0
Renofa Yamaguchi FC (loan)	2017	J2 League	21	0	0	0	–		21	0
Renofa Yamaguchi FC (loan)	2018	J2 League	0	0	0	0	–		0	0
Renofa Yamaguchi FC (loan)	Total		21	0	0	0	0	0	21	0
Renofa Yamaguchi FC	2019	J2 League	14	0	1	0	–		15	0
Renofa Yamaguchi FC	2020	J2 League	18	0	0	0	–		18	0
Renofa Yamaguchi FC	2021	J2 League	0	0	0	0	–		0	0
Renofa Yamaguchi FC	Total		32	0	1	0	0	0	33	0
Kataller Toyama (loan)	2022	J3 League	26	0	2	0	–		28	0
Blaublitz Akita	2023	J2 League	1	0	1	0	0	0	2	0
Blaublitz Akita	2024	J2 League	14	0	1	0	3	0	18	0
Blaublitz Akita	2025	J2 League	37	0	0	0	0	0	37	0
Blaublitz Akita	2026	J2/J3 (100)	6	0	0	0	0	0	6	0
Blaublitz Akita	Total		58	0	2	0	3	0	63	0
Career total			160	0	5	0	3	0	168	0
