= Sho Sato =

Japanese footballer

Sho Sato 佐藤 祥
Personal information
- Full name: Sho Sato
- Date of birth: July 22, 1993 (age 33)
- Place of birth: Chūō-ku, Chiba, Japan
- Height: 1.73 m (5 ft 8 in)
- Position: Midfielder

Team information
- Current team: Tochigi SC
- Number: 4

Youth career
- 2000–2005: Omori SC
- 2006–2011: JEF United Chiba

Senior career*
Years	Team	Apps	(Gls)
2011–2015	JEF United Chiba	3	(0)
2014–2015	→ J.League U-22 (loan)	9	(0)
2015	→ Blaublitz Akita (loan)	13	(3)
2016–2018	Mito HollyHock	84	(0)
2019	Thespakusatsu Gunma	31	(2)
2020–	Tochigi SC	169	(3)
- * Club domestic league appearances and goals as of 17 August 2026

Sho Sato (佐藤 祥, Satō Shō; born July 22, 1993) is a Japanese footballer who plays as a midfielder for Tochigi SC.

== Career ==
He made his debut for the first team after joining from the U-18s in the away loss (0–1) against FC Tokyo on 26 November 2011.

== Career statistics ==
Updated to 23 February 2018.

Appearances and goals by club, season and competition
Club	Season	League			Emperor's Cup		Total	
Club	Season	Division	Apps	Goals	Apps	Goals	Apps	Goals
JEF United Chiba	2011	J2 League	2	0	0	0	2	0
JEF United Chiba	2012	J2 League	0	0	2	0	2	0
JEF United Chiba	2013	J2 League	0	0	0	0	0	0
JEF United Chiba	2014	J2 League	0	0	2	0	2	0
JEF United Chiba	2015	J2 League	1	0	–		1	0
Blaublitz Akita	2015	J3 League	13	3	2	0	15	3
Mito HollyHock	2016	J2 League	35	0	0	0	35	0
Mito HollyHock	2017	J2 League	39	0	0	0	39	0
Total			90	3	6	0	96	3
