= Tsuyoshi Miyaichi =

Japanese footballer (born 1995)

Tsuyoshi Miyaichi 宮市 剛
Personal information
- Full name: Tsuyoshi Miyaichi
- Date of birth: 1 June 1995 (age 31)
- Place of birth: Okazaki, Aichi, Japan
- Height: 1.85 m (6 ft 1 in)
- Position: Right winger

Team information
- Current team: Kamatamare Sanuki
- Number: 18

Youth career
- –2007: Sylphid FC
- 2008–2010: Nagoya Grampus
- 2011–2013: Chukyo University Chukyo High School

Senior career*
| Years | Team | Apps | (Gls) |
| 2014–2018 | Shonan Bellmare | 4 | (0) |
| 2015 | → Mito HollyHock (loan) | 14 | (0) |
| 2014–2015 | → J. League U-22 (loan) | 8 | (0) |
| 2016 | → Gainare Tottori (loan) | 0 | (0) |
| 2017 | → MIO Biwako Shiga (loan) | 3 | (0) |
| 2018 | → Grulla Morioka (loan) | 29 | (3) |
| 2019–2024 | Iwate Grulla Morioka | 134 | (9) |
| 2025– | Kamatamare Sanuki | 7 | (0) |
- * Club domestic league appearances and goals as of 1 January 2026

Tsuyoshi Miyaichi (宮市 剛, Miyaichi Tsuyoshi; born 1 June 1995) is a Japanese footballer who plays as a right winger for Kamatamare Sanuki.

== Career ==
=== Shonan Bellmare ===
On 13 August 2013, Miyaichi was registered as a Specially Designated Player.

Tsuyoshi Miyaichi was signed by Shonan Bellmare in 2014. He made his league debut against Tokyo Verdy on 31 May 2014. On 6 December 2018, it was announced that Shonan Bellmare would not be renewing his contract.

=== Loan to Mito Hollyhock ===
Miyaichi was loaned to Mito Hollyhock in 2015. He made his league debut against Roasso Kumamoto on 8 March 2015.

=== Loan to Gainare Tottori ===
For 2016 he was out on loan to J3 team Gainare Tottori.

=== Loan to MIO Biwako Shiga ===
On 29 June 2017, he was announced at MIO Biwako Shiga.

=== Loan to Iwate Grulla Morioka ===
In 2018, Miyaichi moved on loan to Grulla Morioka. He made his league debut against Gamba Osaka U-23 on 11 March 2018. Miyaichi scored his first league goal against Cerezo Osaka U-23 on 7 July 2018, scoring in the 13th minute.

=== Iwate Grulla Morioka ===
On 8 January 2019, Miyaichi was announced at Iwate Grulla Morioka. He made his league debut against Roasso Kumamoto on 31 March 2019. Miyaichi scored his first league goal against Azul Claro Numazu on 9 June 2019, scoring in the 36th minute. On 15 December 2020, Miyaichi's contract was renewed and he was diagnosed with Osgood syndrome.

== Personal life ==
Miyaichi is the younger brother of Ryo Miyaichi.

== Career statistics ==
=== Club ===
Updated to 2 April 2023.

Appearances and goals by club, season and competition
| Club | Season | League | | | Emperor's Cup | | Total | |
| Club | Season | Division | Apps | Goals | Apps | Goals | Apps | Goals |
|---|---|---|---|---|---|---|---|---|
| Shonan Bellmare | 2014 | J2 League | 4 | 0 | 1 | 0 | 5 | 0 |
| Mito HollyHock | 2015 | J2 League | 14 | 0 | 0 | 0 | 14 | 0 |
| Gainare Tottori | 2016 | J3 League | 17 | 1 | 1 | 2 | 18 | 3 |
| MIO Biwako Shiga | 2017 | JFL | 3 | 0 | – | | 3 | 0 |
| Grulla Morioka | 2018 | J3 League | 29 | 3 | 1 | 0 | 30 | 3 |
| Iwate Grulla Morioka | 2019 | J3 League | 25 | 3 | 1 | 0 | 26 | 3 |
| Iwate Grulla Morioka | 2020 | J3 League | 24 | 0 | 0 | 0 | 24 | 0 |
| Iwate Grulla Morioka | 2021 | J3 League | 1 | 0 | 0 | 0 | 1 | 0 |
| Iwate Grulla Morioka | 2022 | J2 League | 23 | 2 | 1 | 0 | 24 | 2 |
| Iwate Grulla Morioka | 2023 | J3 League | 5 | 3 | 0 | 0 | 5 | 3 |
| Career total | | | 153 | 12 | 5 | 2 | 158 | 14 |

== Honours ==
Shonan Bellmare

- J2 League: 2014
