= Ayumi Niekawa =

Japanese footballer (born 1994)

Ayumi Niekawa 牲川 歩見
Personal information
- Full name: Ayumi Niekawa
- Date of birth: 12 May 1994 (age 32)
- Place of birth: Hamamatsu, Shizuoka, Japan
- Height: 1.95 m (6 ft 5 in)
- Position: Goalkeeper

Team information
- Current team: Júbilo Iwata
- Number: 16

Youth career
- 2007–2012: Júbilo Iwata

Senior career*
Years	Team	Apps	(Gls)
2013–2019	Júbilo Iwata	0	(0)
2014–2015	→ J. League U-22 (loan)	21	(0)
2016	→ Sagan Tosu (loan)	0	(0)
2017	→ Thespakusatsu Gunma (loan)	11	(0)
2018–2019	→ Azul Claro Numazu (loan)	56	(0)
2020–2021	Mito HollyHock	60	(0)
2022–2026	Urawa Red Diamonds	6	(0)
2026–	Júbilo Iwata	1	(0)

International career
2011	Japan U-17	1	(0)
Medal record
Representing Japan
AFC U-23 Championship
Gold medal – first place	2016 Qatar
- * Club domestic league appearances and goals as of 14 August 2026

Ayumi Niekawa (牲川 歩見, Niekawa Ayumi; born 12 May 1994) is a Japanese professional footballer who plays as a goalkeeper for J2 League club Júbilo Iwata.

== National team career ==
In June 2011, Niekawa was elected Japan U-17 national team for 2011 U-17 World Cup. He played 1 match against Argentina.

== Club statistics ==
As of 25 June 2022

Appearances and goals by club, season and competition
Club	Season	League			Cup		League Cup		Continental		Total	
Club	Season	Division	Apps	Goals	Apps	Goals	Apps	Goals	Apps	Goals	Apps	Goals
Japan			League		Emperor's Cup		J.League Cup		AFC		Total	
Júbilo Iwata	2013	J1 League	0	0	0	0	0	0	–		0	0
Júbilo Iwata	2014	J2 League	0	0	0	0	–		–		0	0
Júbilo Iwata	Total		0	0	0	0	0	0	0	0	0	0
J.League U-22 Selection (loan)	2014	J3 League	9	0	0	0	–		–		9	0
J.League U-22 Selection (loan)	2015	J3 League	12	0	0	0	–		–		12	0
J.League U-22 Selection (loan)	Total		21	0	0	0	0	0	0	0	21	0
Sagan Tosu (loan)	2016	J1 League	0	0	0	0	0	0	–		0	0
Thespakusatsu Gunma (loan)	2017	J2 League	11	0	2	0	–		–		13	0
Azul Claro Numazu (loan)	2018	J3 League	27	0	0	0	–		–		27	0
Azul Claro Numazu (loan)	2019	J3 League	29	0	0	0	–		–		29	0
Azul Claro Numazu (loan)	Total		56	0	0	0	0	0	0	0	56	0
Mito Hollyhock	2020	J2 League	20	0	0	0	–		–		20	0
Mito Hollyhock	2021	J2 League	40	0	0	0	–		–		40	0
Mito Hollyhock	Total		60	0	0	0	0	0	0	0	60	0
Urawa Red Diamonds	2022	J1 League	0	0	0	0	0	0	1	0	1	0
Career total			148	0	2	0	0	0	1	0	151	0

== Honours ==
=== Club ===
Urawa Red Diamonds

- AFC Champions League: 2022
