= Ryosuke Tamura =

Japanese footballer

Ryosuke Tamura 田村 亮介
Personal information
- Full name: Ryosuke Tamura
- Date of birth: 8 May 1995 (age 31)
- Place of birth: Nara, Japan
- Height: 1.70 m (5 ft 7 in)
- Position: Forward

Team information
- Current team: Nara Club
- Number: 7

Youth career
- –2010: Nara YMCA
- 2011–2013: Kyoto Sanga

Senior career*
Years	Team	Apps	(Gls)
2014–2018	Kyoto Sanga	24	(1)
2014–2015	→ J. League U-22 (loan)	11	(1)
2015	→ Sagan Tosu (loan)	1	(0)
2019–2021	Fukushima United FC	68	(16)
2021	FC Anyang	19	(2)
2022–2023	Gainare Tottori	55	(12)
2024–	Nara Club	73	(7)
- * Club domestic league appearances and goals as of 25 August 2026

Ryosuke Tamura (田村 亮介, Tamura Ryōsuke; born 8 May 1995 in Nara) is a Japanese footballer who plays as Forward. He currently play for Nara Club.

== Career ==
On 5 January 2019, Tamura joined to J3 club, Fukushima United for ahead of 2019 season.

On 28 January 2021, Tamura abroad to South Korea and transferred to K League 2 club, FC Anyang for 2021 season.

On 22 January 2022, Tamura joined to J3 club, Gainare Tottori for ahead of 2022 season.

== Career statistics ==
Updated to the start of 2023 season.

Appearances and goals by club, season and competition
Club	Season	League			Emperor's Cup		J.League Cup		Total	
Club	Season	Division	Apps	Goals	Apps	Goals	Apps	Goals	Apps	Goals
Kyoto Sanga	2014	J2 League	8	0	0	0	—		8	0
Sagan Tosu	2015	J1 League	1	0	1	0	3	0	5	0
Kyoto Sanga	2016	J2 League	4	0	1	0	—		5	0
Kyoto Sanga	2017	J2 League	10	1	0	0	—		10	1
Kyoto Sanga	2018	J2 League	2	0	1	0	—		3	0
Fukushima United FC	2019	J3 League	34	7	—		—		34	7
Fukushima United FC	2020	J3 League	34	9	—		—		34	9
FC Anyang	2021	K League 2	18	2	3	0	—		22	2
Gainare Tottori	2022	J3 League	27	5	1	0	—		28	5
Gainare Tottori	2023	J3 League	0	0	0	0	—		0	0
Career total			138	24	7	0	3	0	148	24
