= Yuya Mitsunaga =

Japanese footballer

Yuya Mitsunaga 光永 祐也
Personal information
- Full name: Yuya Mitsunaga
- Date of birth: 29 November 1995 (age 30)
- Place of birth: Fukuoka, Japan
- Height: 1.78 m (5 ft 10 in)
- Position: Defender

Team information
- Current team: Shinagawa CC

Youth career
- 2011–2013: Avispa Fukuoka Youth

Senior career*
Years	Team	Apps	(Gls)
2014–2016	Avispa Fukuoka	4	(0)
2014	→ J. League U-22 (loan)	6	(0)
2015	→ Nagano Parceiro (loan)	2	(0)
2016	→ Azul Claro Numazu (loan)	0	(0)
2017	Roasso Kumamoto	16	(0)
2018	Fujieda MYFC	18	(0)
2019–2022	Thespakusatsu Gunma	50	(1)
2022	→ Vonds Ichihara (loan)	0	(0)
2023–	Shinagawa CC	0	(0)
- * Club domestic league appearances and goals as of 22 January 2023, 4:20 (UTC)

Yuya Mitsunaga (光永 祐也, Mitsunaga Yūya; born November 29, 1995) is a Japanese footballer as Defender, who currently play for Shinagawa CC. So far, as of June 2022, in his first 9 years of footballing activity, he signed for clubs in all the 4 national-wide divisions plus the regional-wide Kantō Soccer League.

== Career statistics ==
=== Club ===
Updated to the start from 2023 season.

Club performance			League		Cup		Total	
Season	Club	League	Apps	Goals	Apps	Goals	Apps	Goals
2014	Avispa Fukuoka	J2 League	4	0	0	0	4	0
2015	Nagano Parceiro	J3 League	2	0	1	0	3	0
2016	Azul Claro Numazu	JFL	0	0	0	0	0	0
2017	Roasso Kumamoto	J2 League	16	0	0	0	16	0
2018	Fujieda MYFC	J3 League	18	0	0	0	18	0
2019	Thespakusatsu Gunma	J3 League	32	1	1	0	33	1
2020	Thespakusatsu Gunma	J2 League	3	0	0	0	3	0
2021	Thespakusatsu Gunma	J2 League	11	0	1	0	12	0
2022	Thespakusatsu Gunma	J2 League	4	0	1	0	5	0
2022	Vonds Ichihara	Kantō Soccer League	10	0	0	0	10	0
2023	Shinagawa CC	Kanagawa Prefectural League	0	0	0	0	0	0
Total			102	1	4	0	106	1
