= Goson Sakai =

Japanese footballer

Personal information
- Date of birth: March 20, 1996 (age 30)
- Place of birth: Sanjō, Niigata, Japan
- Height: 1.83 m (6 ft 0 in)
- Position: Defender

Youth career
- 2011–2013: Albirex Niigata Youth

Senior career*
Years	Team	Apps	(Gls)
2014–2017	Albirex Niigata	2	(0)
2014–2015	→ J.League U-22 (loan)	4	(0)
2016	→ Fukushima United (loan)	5	(0)
2018–2019	LSK Hansa	45	(5)
2019–2021	VfR Aalen	52	(4)
2021–2022	FV Illertissen	35	(3)
Medal record
Representing Japan
AFC U-16 Championship
Silver medal – second place	2012 Iran
- * Club domestic league appearances and goals as of 14 May 2022

Goson Sakai (酒井 高聖, Sakai Gōson; born March 20, 1996) is a Japanese retired football player. He is the younger brother of Gōtoku and Noriyoshi Sakai.

== Early life ==
Sakai was born to a German mother and a Japanese father.
