= Shuhei Kawata =

Japanese footballer (born 1994)

Shuhei Kawata 川田 修平
Personal information
- Full name: Shuhei Kawata
- Date of birth: April 5, 1994 (age 32)
- Place of birth: Fukaya, Saitama, Japan
- Height: 1.87 m (6 ft 1 1/2 in)
- Position: Goalkeeper

Team information
- Current team: Tochigi SC
- Number: 1

Youth career
- Fukaya Toyozato SSS
- –2009: FC Shibuya
- 2010–2012: Omiya Ardija

Senior career*
Years	Team	Apps	(Gls)
2013–2016	Omiya Ardija	0	(0)
2014	→ J.League U-22 (loan)	1	(0)
2016	→ Tochigi SC (loan)	0	(0)
2017–	Tochigi SC	143	(0)
2018	→ Fujieda MYFC (loan)	0	(0)
- * Club domestic league appearances and goals as of 17 August 2026

Shuhei Kawata (川田 修平, Kawata Shuhei; born April 5, 1994 in Saitama) is a Japanese footballer who plays for Tochigi SC.

== Playing career ==
Shuhei Kawata joined Omiya Ardija in 2013. After three seasons with the Squirrels, he moved to Tochigi SC.
