= Takaaki Kinoshita =

Japanese footballer

Takaaki Kinoshita 木下高彰
Personal information
- Full name: Takaaki Kinoshita
- Date of birth: 11 June 1993 (age 33)
- Place of birth: Hamamatsu, Japan
- Height: 1.82 m (6 ft 0 in)
- Position: Centre back

Team information
- Current team: ReinMeer Aomori
- Number: 3

Youth career
- 2006–2011: Hamamatsu Kaiseikan

Senior career*
Years	Team	Apps	(Gls)
2012–2015	Júbilo Iwata	6	(0)
2014–2015	→ J. League U-22 (loan)	8	(2)
2016–2018	Mito HollyHock	0	(0)
2017	→ Fukushima United FC (loan)	13	(0)
2018	→ Fujieda MYFC (loan)	2	(0)
2019	Iwate Grulla Morioka	23	(3)
2020–	ReinMeer Aomori	0	(0)
- * Club domestic league appearances and goals as of 19:28, 9 July 2020 (UTC)

Takaaki Kinoshita (木下 高彰, Kinoshita Takaaki; born 11 June 1993) is a Japanese footballer who plays for ReinMeer Aomori.

== Career ==
Kinoshita moved to the Japan Football League club ReinMeer Aomori on 26 December 2019.

== Career statistics ==
Updated to 23 February 2018.

Appearances and goals by club, season and competition
Club	Season	League			Emperor's Cup		League		Total	
Club	Season	Division	Apps	Goals	Apps	Goals	Apps	Goals	Apps	Goals
Júbilo Iwata	2012	J1 League	0	0	0	0	0	0	0	0
Júbilo Iwata	2013	J1 League	0	0	0	0	0	0	0	0
Júbilo Iwata	2014	J2 League	6	0	1	0	—		7	0
Júbilo Iwata	2015	J2 League	0	0	2	0	—		2	0
Mito HollyHock	2016	J2 League	0	0	2	0	—		2	0
Fukushima United FC	2017	J3 League	13	0	—		—		13	0
Career total			19	2	5	0	0	0	19	2
