= Tsutomu Takahata =

Japanese footballer and manager

Tsutomu Takahata 高畠 勉
Personal information
- Full name: Tsutomu Takahata
- Date of birth: June 16, 1968 (age 58)
- Place of birth: Takatsuki, Osaka, Japan
- Height: 1.73 m (5 ft 8 in)
- Position: Midfielder

Youth career
- 1984–1986: Hokuyo High School
- 1987–1990: Osaka University of Health and Sport Sciences

Senior career*
Years	Team	Apps	(Gls)
1991–1995	Fujitsu		

Managerial career
- 2008: Kawasaki Frontale
- 2010: Kawasaki Frontale
- 2014–2015: J.League U-22
- 2016–2019: Hebei China Fortune Youth
- 2021–2023: Hainan Star
- 2023: China U17
- 2023–2024: Wuhan Three Towns
- 2025: Guangdong Mingtu
- * Club domestic league appearances and goals

Tsutomu Takahata (高畠 勉, Takahata Tsutomu; born June 16, 1968) is a Japanese football manager and former professional player.

== Playing career ==
Takahata was born in Takatsuki on June 16, 1968. After graduating from Osaka University of Health and Sport Sciences, he joined Fujitsu in 1991. He retired in 1995.

== Coaching career ==
After retirement, in 1996, Takahata became a coach at Fujitsu (later Kawasaki Frontale). In April 2008, manager Takashi Sekizuka resigned for health reasons, Takahata managed the club. In 2009, Sekizuka came back to a manager, Takahata returned to a coach. In 2010, Takahata became a manager again as Sekizuka successor. He left the club end of 2013 season and he became a manager for J.League U-22 Selection.

In January 2016, Takahata first came to China as the head coach of Hebei China Fortune's youth system. He was the head coach of Hainan Star from 2021 to June 2023, where he led them to promotion to China League Two in his first season at the club. On 18 June 2023, he was appointed as the new head coach of Chinese Super League's defending champions Wuhan Three Towns. On 5 January 2024, he stepped down as head coach of Wuhan Three Towns.

== Managerial statistics ==
Team	From	To	Record				
Team	From	To	G	W	D	L	Win %
Kawasaki Frontale	2008	2008	27	16	4	7	59.26
Kawasaki Frontale	2010	2010	34	15	9	10	44.12
J.League U-22	2014	2015	69	16	13	40	23.19
Hainan Star	2021	2023	14	5	2	7	35.71
Wuhan Three Towns	2023	2023	26	13	4	9	50.00
Guangdong Mingtu	2025	2025	5	0	1	4	0.00
Total			175	65	33	77	37.14
