= Fumitaka Kitatani =

Japanese footballer

Personal information
- Date of birth: 18 August 1995 (age 31)
- Place of birth: Izumisano, Japan
- Height: 1.80 m (5 ft 11 in)
- Position: Centre back

Team information
- Current team: Ventforet Kofu
- Number: 13

Youth career
- 2011–2013: Kokoku High School

Senior career*
Years	Team	Apps	(Gls)
2014–2016	Yokohama F. Marinos	0	(0)
2014–2015	→ J.League U-22 Selection (loan)	9	(1)
2016	→ Renofa Yamaguchi FC (loan)	38	(1)
2017–2018	V-Varen Nagasaki	14	(0)
2018	→ FC Gifu (loan)	11	(0)
2019–2021	FC Gifu	21	(0)
2021–	Ventforet Kofu	13	(0)
- * Club domestic league appearances and goals as of 17:15, 23 August 2022 (UTC)

Fumitaka Kitatani (北谷 史孝, Kitatani Fumitaka; born 18 August 1995 in Izumisano, Osaka, Japan) is a Japanese football player who plays for Ventforet Kofu.

== Club career statistics ==
Updated to end of 2018 season.

Club performance			League		Cup		League Cup		Total	
Season	Club	League	Apps	Goals	Apps	Goals	Apps	Goals	Apps	Goals
Japan			League		Emperor's Cup		J. League Cup		Total	
2014	Yokohama F. Marinos	J1 League	0	0	0	0	0	0	0	0
2015	Yokohama F. Marinos	J1 League	0	0	1	0	0	0	1	0
2016	Renofa Yamaguchi	J2 League	38	1	2	0	–		40	1
2017	V-Varen Nagasaki	J2 League	14	0	1	0	–		15	0
2018	V-Varen Nagasaki	J1 League	0	0	0	0	4	0	4	0
2018	FC Gifu	J2 League	11	0	0	0	–		11	0
Total			63	1	4	0	4	0	71	1

== Achievements ==
- Japanese Super Cup: 2014 runners-up
