= Kosuke Nakamura =

Japanese footballer

Kosuke Nakamura 中村 航輔
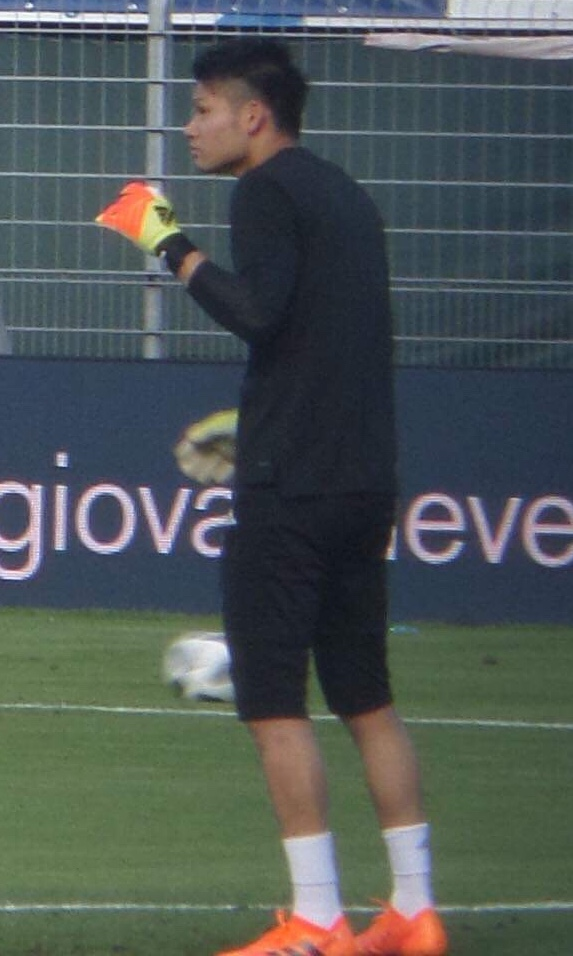
- Nakamura with Japan in 2018

Personal information
- Date of birth: 27 February 1995 (age 31)
- Place of birth: Kita, Tokyo, Japan
- Height: 1.85 m (6 ft 1 in)
- Position: Goalkeeper

Team information
- Current team: Cerezo Osaka
- Number: 23

Youth career
- 2001–2004: Koala FC
- 2005–2012: Kashiwa Reysol

Senior career*
Years	Team	Apps	(Gls)
2013–2020	Kashiwa Reysol	130	(0)
2014	→ J.League U-22 (loan)	3	(0)
2015	→ Avispa Fukuoka (loan)	20	(0)
2021–2025	Portimonense	56	(0)
2026–	Cerezo Osaka	0	(0)

International career^{‡}
2011	Japan U17	9	(0)
2016	Japan U23	6	(0)
2017–2023	Japan	8	(0)
Medal record
Kashiwa Reysol
Winner	J.League Cup	2013
- * Club domestic league appearances and goals as of 3 June 2024 ‡ National team caps and goals as of 12 September 2023

Kosuke Nakamura (中村 航輔, Nakamura Kōsuke; born 27 February 1995) is a Japanese professional footballer who plays as a goalkeeper for J1 League club Cerezo Osaka.

== International career ==
In June 2011, Nakamura was called up to the Japan U17 national team for the 2011 FIFA U-17 World Cup and he played four matches. In August 2016, he was also selected for the Japan U23 national team for the 2016 Summer Olympics and he played two matches.

In May 2018, he was named in the Japan national team's squad for the 2018 FIFA World Cup in Russia.

== Career statistics ==
=== Club ===
As of 27 May 2023

Appearances and goals by club, season and competition
Club	Season	League			National cup (Note: Includes Emperor's Cup and Taça de Portugal.)		League cup (Note: Includes J.League Cup and Taça da Liga.)		Continental (Note: Includes AFC Champions League.)		Total	
Club	Season	Division	Apps	Goals	Apps	Goals	Apps	Goals	Apps	Goals	Apps	Goals
Kashiwa Reysol	2013	J1 League	0	0	0	0	0	0	–		0	0
Kashiwa Reysol	2014	J1 League	0	0	0	0	0	0	–		0	0
Kashiwa Reysol	2016	J1 League	28	0	3	0	1	0	–		32	0
Kashiwa Reysol	2017	J1 League	34	0	4	0	0	0	–		38	0
Kashiwa Reysol	2018	J1 League	17	0	0	0	0	0	4	0	21	0
Kashiwa Reysol	2019	J2 League	41	0	2	0	1	0	–		44	0
Kashiwa Reysol	2020	J1 League	10	0	–		1	0	–		11	0
Kashiwa Reysol	Total		130	0	9	0	3	0	4	0	146	0
Avispa Fukuoka (loan)	2015	J2 League	20	0	1	0	–		–		21	0
Portimonense	2020–21	Primeira Liga	0	0	–		–		–		0	0
Portimonense	2021–22	Primeira Liga	2	0	1	0	0	0	–		3	0
Portimonense	2022–23	Primeira Liga	30	0	0	0	2	0	–		32	0
Portimonense	Total		32	0	1	0	2	0	4	0	35	0
Career total			182	0	11	0	5	0	4	0	202	0

=== International ===
As of 12 September 2023

Appearances and goals by national team and year
National team	Year	Apps	Goals
Japan	2017	2	0
Japan	2018	2	0
Japan	2019	2	0
Japan	2021	0	0
Japan	2023	2	0
Total		8	0

== Honours ==
Individual

- J.League Best XI: 2017
- J1 100 Year Vision League Regional Round West Best Eleven: 2026
