= Shota Saito (footballer, born 1996) =

Japanese footballer (born 1996)

Shota Saito 斎藤 翔太
Personal information
- Full name: Shota Saito
- Date of birth: 7 December 1996 (age 29)
- Place of birth: Ōmiya, Saitama, Japan
- Height: 1.70 m (5 ft 7 in)
- Position: Midfielder

Team information
- Current team: Reilac Shiga FC
- Number: 13

Youth career
- Urawa Red Diamonds

Senior career*
Years	Team	Apps	(Gls)
2015–2018	Urawa Red Diamonds	0	(0)
2015	→ J.League U-22 (loan)	8	(0)
2016–2017	→ Mito HollyHock (loan)	0	(0)
2018–2019	Japan Soccer College	20	(5)
2020–2022	Suzuka Point Getters	8	(0)
2023–	Reilac Shiga FC	0	(0)

International career
2013	Japan U-17	3	(0)
Medal record
Urawa Reds
Runner-up	Emperor's Cup	2015
- * Club domestic league appearances and goals as of 18 February 2023, 14:30 (UTC)

Shota Saito (斎藤 翔太, Saitō Shōta; born December 7, 1996 in Saitama) is a Japanese football player who plays as Midfielder. He currently play for Reilac Shiga FC.

== Club career ==
Saito joined to J1 League club; Urawa Red Diamonds in 2015. In 2016, he moved to J2 League club; Mito HollyHock.

On 7 January 2023, Saito announcement officially transfer to JFL club, Reilac Shiga FC for ahead of 2023 season.

== National team career ==
In October 2013, Saito was elected Japan U-17 national team for 2013 U-17 World Cup. He played 3 matches.

== Career statistics ==
=== Club ===
Updated to the start of 2023 season.

Club performance			League		Cup		League Cup		Total	
Season	Club	League	Apps	Goals	Apps	Goals	Apps	Goals	Apps	Goals
Japan			League		Emperor's Cup		J. League Cup		Total	
2015	Urawa Red Diamonds	J1 League	0	0	0	0	0	0	0	0
2016	Mito HollyHock	J2 League	0	0	2	0	–		2	0
2017	Mito HollyHock	J2 League	0	0	1	0	–		1	0
2018	Japan Soccer College	Hokushinetsu Football League	8	2	–				8	2
2019	Japan Soccer College	Hokushinetsu Football League	12	3	–				12	3
2020	Suzuka Point Getters	Japan Football League	4	0	–				4	0
2021	Suzuka Point Getters	Japan Football League	1	0	–				1	0
2022	Suzuka Point Getters	Japan Football League	3	0	–				3	0
2023	Reilac Shiga FC	Japan Football League	0	0	0	0	–		0	0
Career total			28	5	3	0	0	0	31	5
