= Kenichi Tanimura =

Japanese footballer

Kenichi Tanimura 谷村 憲一
Personal information
- Full name: Kenichi Tanimura
- Date of birth: January 26, 1995 (age 31)
- Place of birth: Morioka, Iwate, Japan
- Height: 1.85 m (6 ft 1 in)
- Position: Midfielder

Team information
- Current team: Morioka Zebra
- Number: 26

Youth career
- 2010–2012: Iwate Prefectural Morioka; Commercial High School

Senior career*
Years	Team	Apps	(Gls)
2013–2015	Montedio Yamagata	0	(0)
2014	→ J. League U-22 (loan)	3	(0)
2014	→ Gainare Tottori (loan)	3	(0)
2015	→ Grulla Morioka (loan)	6	(0)
2016–2018	Grulla Morioka	56	(6)
2019–	Morioka Zebra		
Medal record
Montedio Yamagata
Runner-up	Emperor's Cup	2014
- * Club domestic league appearances and goals as of 14 April 2019

Kenichi Tanimura (谷村 憲一, Tanimura Ken'ichi; born January 26, 1995) is a Japanese football player, who plays for Morioka Zebra as a midfielder.

== Career ==
Considered as one of the strongest prospects of Japan high school-world, Tanimura signed for Montedio Yamagata in January 2013.

Unfortunately for him, Tanimura won't be fielded with Montedio and started a series of loans in J3: first to Gainare Tottori, then to Grulla Morioka. After some negotiations, Tanimura decided to sign permanently to his home town-side.

== Career statistics ==
Updated to 14 March 2019.

Appearances and goals by club, season and competition
Club	Season	League			Emperor's Cup		Total	
Club	Season	Division	Apps	Goals	Apps	Goals	Apps	Goals
Montedio Yamagata	2013	J2 League	0	0	0	0	0	0
Montedio Yamagata	2014	J2 League	0	0	0	0	0	0
Gainare Tottori	2014	J3 League	3	0	–		3	0
Grulla Morioka	2015	J3 League	6	0	0	0	6	0
Grulla Morioka	2016	J3 League	17	2	2	0	19	2
Grulla Morioka	2017	J3 League	23	3	2	0	25	3
Grulla Morioka	2018	J3 League	16	1	0	0	16	1
Career total			65	6	4	0	69	6
