= J.League U-22 Selection =

Japanese football club

- Full name: J.League U-22 Selection
- Nickname: J-22
- Founded: 2014
- Dissolved: 2015
- Owner: J.League
- Manager: Tsutomu Takahata
- League: J3 League
- 2015: 12th

J.League U-22 Selection (Jリーグ・アンダー22選抜) was a Japanese football team which played in J3 League from 2014 season to 2015 season.

The idea of the club was to give young players minutes as they might struggle to find game time with their main club playing in the J1 League and J2 League which the U-22 team is not eligible for promotion regardless of their final position however this scheme was phased out after the 2015 J3 League season and were replaced with J1 League feeder teams such as Cerezo Osaka U-23, FC Tokyo U-23 and Gamba Osaka U-23.

== Manager ==
- 2014-2015; Tsutomu Takahata

== Players ==
Only players who played for the team in the match.

=== 2014 season ===
Player	Loan From	Position
Naoki Kawaguchi	Albirex Niigata	Defender
Kazuki Kozuka	Albirex Niigata	Midfielder
Musashi Suzuki	Albirex Niigata	Forward
Daiki Kogure	Cerezo Osaka	Midfielder
Takaya Osanai	Consadole Sapporo	Defender
Yuto Nagasaka	Consadole Sapporo	Defender
Shogo Nakahara	Consadole Sapporo	Midfielder
Naoya Fuji	Ehime FC	Midfielder
Shuto Kono	FC Tokyo	Midfielder
Ken Tajiri	Gamba Osaka	Goalkeeper
Takaharu Nishino	Gamba Osaka	Defender
Sho Sato	JEF United Chiba	Midfielder
Haruya Ide	JEF United Chiba	Midfielder
Ayumi Niekawa	Júbilo Iwata	Goalkeeper
Takaaki Kinoshita	Júbilo Iwata	Defender
Yukitoshi Ito	Kashima Antlers	Defender
Ryuta Miyauchi	Kashima Antlers	Midfielder
Yu Kimura	Kashiwa Reysol	Forward
Yuji Takahashi	Kyoto Sanga	Defender
Riki Harakawa	Kyoto Sanga	Midfielder
Kazuki Mine	Kyoto Sanga	Forward
Tatsuya Wada	Matsumoto Yamaga	Midfielder
Tsubasa Suzuki	Montedio Yamagata	Defender
Kazuki Sato	Nagoya Grampus	Defender
Ryota Tanabe	Nagoya Grampus	Midfielder
Yusuke Goto	Oita Trinita	Forward
Shuhei Kawata	Omiya Ardija	Goalkeeper
Shuto Hira	Sagan Tosu	Forward
Gakuto Notsuda	Sanfrecce Hiroshima	Midfielder
Satoru Kashiwase	Shimizu S-Pulse	Forward
Sho Kagami	Shimizu S-Pulse	Forward
Shohei Yokoyama	Thespakusatsu Gunma	Midfielder
Shinya Yajima	Urawa Red Diamonds	Midfielder
Keita Fujimura	Vegalta Sendai	Midfielder
Ryosuke Maeda	Vissel Kobe	Midfielder
Ryo Matsumura	Vissel Kobe	Midfielder
Ryota Suzuki	Yokohama F. Marinos	Goalkeeper
Andrew Kumagai	Yokohama F. Marinos	Midfielder

Hideyuki Nozawa, Takuya Kida, Yuta Toyokawa, Tsubasa Nihei, Hideki Ishige, Taishin Morikawa, Hiroki Akino, Yusuke Kobayashi, Naomichi Ueda, Tomoki Wada, Hiroto Nakagawa, Kengo Nagai, Kyohei Yoshino, Takuma Asano, Genki Yamada, Reo Mochizuki, Kenichi Tanimura, Shunta Awaka, Nikki Havenaar, Kosuke Nakamura, Genta Miura, Toru Takagiwa, Yuto Mori, Tomoya Koyamatsu, Yuto Uchida, Shota Kaneko, Masatoshi Ishida, Yuki Uchiyama, Keisuke Oyama, Ryosuke Tamura, Haruki Umemura, Tsuyoshi Miyaichi, Keita Ishii, Go Iwase, Naoki Ogawa, Koya Yuruki, Hiroyuki Mae, Yosei Otsu, Daiki Yagishita, Fumitaka Kitatani, Shinnosuke Hatanaka, Hayao Kawabe, Yuto Koizumi, Naoki Otani, Eiji Shirai, Shuhei Kamimura, Shota Fukuoka, Ado Onaiwu, Yuya Mitsunaga, Taro Sugimoto, Tasuku Hiraoka, Soya Takahashi, Ryota Aoki, Yohei Takaoka, Goson Sakai, Kazuya Miyahara, Shinnosuke Nakatani, Kenshin Yoshimaru, Yosuke Ideguchi, Koki Sugimori

=== 2015 season ===
Ryota Oshima, Masatoshi Kushibiki, Ken Matsubara, Ryota Tanabe, Kazuki Mine, Ryosuke Yamanaka, Shuto Kono, Taisuke Mizuno, Kazuki Sato, Takumi Kiyomoto, Takaaki Kinoshita, Ken Tajiri, Takaya Osanai, Daichi Sugimoto, Sho Sato, Shota Sakaki, Kento Hashimoto, Keita Fujimura, Yukitoshi Ito, Takaharu Nishino, Takayuki Mae, Tatsuki Nara, Musashi Suzuki, Sho Kagami, Ryosuke Maeda, Ayumi Niekawa, Daiki Kogure, Shogo Nakahara, Yuto Nagasaka, Naoki Kawaguchi, Gakuto Notsuda, Takuya Iwanami, Tatsuya Wada, Daichi Akiyama, Hideyuki Nozawa, Takuya Kida, Shoya Nakajima, Yuta Toyokawa, Hideki Ishige, Hiroki Akino, Naomichi Ueda, Hiroto Nakagawa, Takuma Asano, Naoki Maeda, Junki Endo, Genki Yamada, Reo Mochizuki, Genta Miura, Toru Takagiwa, Kei Koizumi, Yuto Mori, Shota Kaneko, Masatoshi Ishida, Keisuke Oyama, Ryosuke Tamura, Tsuyoshi Miyaichi, Keita Ishii, Yosuke Tashiro, Koya Yuruki, Hiroyuki Mae, Yosei Otsu, Daiki Yagishita, Fumitaka Kitatani, Shinnosuke Hatanaka, Naoki Otani, Eiji Shirai, Tasuku Hiraoka, Soya Takahashi, Yohei Takaoka, Goson Sakai, Kazuya Miyahara, Shinnosuke Nakatani, Kenshin Yoshimaru, Ryuolivier Iwamoto, Masaya Okugawa, Takuma Mizutani, Yuma Suzuki, Takaya Inui, Natsuki Mugikura, Koki Oshima, Ryosuke Shindo, Taiga Maekawa, Kota Miyamoto, Ryoma Ishida, Masaki Sakamoto, So Hirao, Kazuma Takayama, Koya Kitagawa, Yuki Onishi, Daichi Kamada, Yosuke Ideguchi, Rikiya Uehara, Ko Matsubara, Masato Kojima, Kensei Nakashima, Rikiya Motegi, Shunsuke Motegi, Takuma Nishimura, Ryoya Ogawa, Hisashi Ohashi, Shota Saito, Daisuke Sakai, Ko Itakura, Itsuki Urata, Yuta Nakayama, Koji Miyoshi, Koki Sugimori, Takahiro Kunimoto

== Club records ==
Season	League	Pos.	Pld.	Win	Draw	Lose	GF	GA	GD	Points	Manager
2014	J3 League	10	33	9	6	18	37	63	−26	33	Tsutomu Takahata
2015	J3 League	12	36	7	7	22	28	71	−43	28	Tsutomu Takahata

== Notable players ==
This section contains a list of former players who went on to represent their senior national team in the future.

- Musashi Suzuki (2019–present)
- Gakuto Notsuda (2022–present)

== See also ==
- Team America (NASL)
- Pailan Arrows
