= 2016 in Japanese football =

2016 season

Japanese football in 2016.

== Promotion and relegation ==
Teams relegated from J1 League

- Matsumoto Yamaga
- Shimizu S-Pulse
- Montedio Yamagata

Teams promoted to J1 League

- Omiya Ardija
- Júbilo Iwata
- Avispa Fukuoka

Teams relegated from J2 League

- Oita Trinita
- Tochigi SC

Teams promoted to J2 League

- FC Machida Zelvia
- Renofa Yamaguchi FC

Teams relegated from J3 League

No relegation to the Japan Football League

Teams promoted to J3 League

- Kagoshima United

== J1 League ==
Pos	Team	Pld	W	D	L	GF	GA	GD	Pts	Qualification or relegation
1	Urawa Red Diamonds	34	23	5	6	61	28	+33	74	Champions League group stage and J. League Championship Final
2	Kawasaki Frontale	34	22	6	6	68	39	+29	72	Champions League group stage and J. League Championship 1st Round
3	Kashima Antlers (C)	34	18	5	11	53	34	+19	59	Club World Cup, Champions League group stage and J. League Championship 1st Round
4	Gamba Osaka	34	17	7	10	53	42	+11	58	Champions League play-off round (Note: The winner of the 2016 Emperor's Cup qualified for the Group Stage of the 2017 AFC Champions League. Since the Emperor's Cup winner Kashima Antlers had already qualified for the AFC Champions League, the play-off round spot was awarded to the fourth-placed team.)
5	Omiya Ardija	34	15	11	8	41	36	+5	56	
6	Sanfrecce Hiroshima	34	16	7	11	58	40	+18	55	
7	Vissel Kobe	34	16	7	11	56	43	+13	55	
8	Kashiwa Reysol	34	15	9	10	52	44	+8	54	
9	FC Tokyo	34	15	7	12	39	39	0	52	
10	Yokohama F. Marinos	34	13	12	9	53	38	+15	51	
11	Sagan Tosu	34	12	10	12	36	37	−1	46	
12	Vegalta Sendai	34	13	4	17	39	48	−9	43	
13	Júbilo Iwata	34	8	12	14	37	50	−13	36	
14	Ventforet Kofu	34	7	10	17	32	58	−26	31	
15	Albirex Niigata	34	8	6	20	33	49	−16	30	
16	Nagoya Grampus (R)	34	7	9	18	38	58	−20	30	Relegation to 2017 J2 League
17	Shonan Bellmare (R)	34	7	6	21	30	56	−26	27	Relegation to 2017 J2 League
18	Avispa Fukuoka (R)	34	4	7	23	26	66	−40	19	Relegation to 2017 J2 League

Source: Meiji Yasuda J1 League
Rules for classification: 1) Points; 2) Goal difference; 3) Goals scored.
(C) Champions; (R) Relegated

== J2 League ==
Pos	Team	Pld	W	D	L	GF	GA	GD	Pts	Promotion, qualification or relegation
1	Consadole Sapporo (C, P)	42	25	10	7	65	33	+32	85	Promotion to 2017 J1 League
2	Shimizu S-Pulse (P)	42	25	9	8	85	37	+48	84	Promotion to 2017 J1 League
3	Matsumoto Yamaga	42	24	12	6	62	32	+30	84	Qualification for promotion playoffs (Note: Only teams that meet J1 license criteria can participate in promotion playoffs. If one or more teams fail to meet the criteria, only eligible teams that finished 3rd to 6th will participate and no replacement teams will be added.)
4	Cerezo Osaka (O, P)	42	23	9	10	62	46	+16	78	Qualification for promotion playoffs
5	Kyoto Sanga	42	18	15	9	50	37	+13	69	Qualification for promotion playoffs
6	Fagiano Okayama	42	17	14	11	58	44	+14	65	Qualification for promotion playoffs
7	Machida Zelvia	42	18	11	13	53	44	+9	65	
8	Yokohama FC	42	16	11	15	50	51	−1	59	
9	Tokushima Vortis	42	16	9	17	46	42	+4	57	
10	Ehime FC	42	12	20	10	41	40	+1	56	
11	JEF United Chiba	42	13	14	15	52	53	−1	53	
12	Renofa Yamaguchi	42	14	11	17	55	63	−8	53	
13	Mito HollyHock	42	10	18	14	45	49	−4	48	
14	Montedio Yamagata	42	11	14	17	43	49	−6	47	
15	V-Varen Nagasaki	42	10	17	15	39	51	−12	47	
16	Roasso Kumamoto	42	12	10	20	38	53	−15	46	
17	Thespakusatsu Gunma	42	11	12	19	52	66	−14	45	
18	Tokyo Verdy	42	10	13	19	43	61	−18	43	
19	Kamatamare Sanuki	42	10	13	19	43	62	−19	43	
20	FC Gifu	42	12	7	23	47	71	−24	43	
21	Zweigen Kanazawa (X)	42	8	15	19	36	60	−24	39	Qualification for relegation playoffs (Note: The playoffs and direct exchange between J2 and J3 are subject to eligibility of J2-licensed teams in top 2 of 2016 J3 League.)
22	Giravanz Kitakyushu (R)	42	8	14	20	43	64	−21	38	Relegation to 2017 J3 League

Updated to match(es) played on 20 November 2016. Source: 2016 MEIJI YASUDA J2 LEAGUE League table
Rules for classification: 1) Points; 2) Goal difference; 3) Goals scored
(C) Champions; (O) Play-off winners; (P) Promoted; (R) Relegated; (X) Relegation play-off winner

== J3 League ==
Pos	Team	Pld	W	D	L	GF	GA	GD	Pts	Qualification or relegation
1	Oita Trinita (C, P)	30	19	4	7	50	24	+26	61	Promotion to 2017 J2 League
2	Tochigi SC	30	17	8	5	38	20	+18	59	Qualification to J2 promotion playoffs (Note: Only teams that hold a J2 license are eligible for promotion.)
3	Nagano Parceiro	30	15	7	8	33	22	+11	52	
4	Blaublitz Akita	30	14	8	8	37	26	+11	50	
5	Kagoshima United	30	15	5	10	39	29	+10	50	
6	Kataller Toyama	30	13	10	7	37	29	+8	49	
7	Fujieda MYFC	30	14	3	13	48	42	+6	45	
8	FC Ryukyu	30	12	8	10	46	46	0	44	
9	Gamba Osaka U-23	30	10	8	12	42	41	+1	38	
10	FC Tokyo U-23	30	9	9	12	32	31	+1	36	
11	SC Sagamihara	30	9	8	13	29	46	−17	35	
12	Cerezo Osaka U-23	30	8	8	14	38	47	−9	32	
13	Grulla Morioka	30	6	12	12	43	47	−4	30	
14	Fukushima United	30	7	9	14	35	44	−9	30	
15	Gainare Tottori	30	8	6	16	30	47	−17	30	
16	YSCC Yokohama	30	5	5	20	15	51	−36	20	

Updated to match(es) played on 20 November 2016. Source: 2016 MEIJI YASUDA J3 LEAGUE League table
Rules for classification: 1) Points; 2) Goal difference; 3) Goals scored; 4th) head-to-head results; 5th) disciplinary points; 6th) draw
(C) Champions; (P) Promoted

== Japan Football League ==
Pos	Team	Pld	W	D	L	GF	GA	GD	Pts	Qualification
1	Honda FC (C)	30	18	7	5	52	29	+23	61	
2	Ryutsu Keizai Dragons	30	16	6	8	53	38	+15	54	
3	**Azul Claro Numazu** (P)	30	18	5	7	47	24	+23	59	Promotion to 2017 J3 League (Note: To qualify for promotion, a club must hold a 100 Year Plan status, obtain J3 license (marked in bold in the table), and finish both in the top 4 of the JFL, and either 1st or 2nd among the promotion-eligible clubs.)
4	Honda Lock	30	17	8	5	46	23	+23	59	
5	FC Osaka	30	18	4	8	52	31	+21	58	
6	Sony Sendai	30	17	6	7	56	27	+29	57	
7	Vanraure Hachinohe	30	13	7	10	34	27	+7	46	
8	ReinMeer Aomori	30	13	6	11	35	33	+2	45	
9	MIO Biwako Shiga	30	11	7	12	38	45	−7	40	
10	**Nara Club**	30	10	7	13	41	48	−7	37	
11	Briobecca Urayasu	30	11	3	16	39	47	−8	36	
12	Tokyo Musashino City	30	9	8	13	29	38	−9	35	
13	Verspah Oita	30	6	13	11	30	42	−12	31	
14	Maruyasu Okazaki	30	7	9	14	23	38	−15	30	
15	Tochigi Uva	30	5	1	24	34	77	−43	16	
16	Fagiano Okayama Next	30	2	1	27	19	61	−42	7	Withdrew after the season

Updated to match(es) played on 13 November 2016. Source: JFL website (in Japanese)
Rules for classification: 1) Points; 2) Goal difference; 3) Goals scored; 4) Head-to-head results; 5) Disciplinary points; 6) Draw
(C) Champions; (P) Promoted

== National team (Men) ==
=== Results ===
24 March 2018 FIFA World Cup qualification (AFC) round 2	Japan	5–0	Afghanistan	Saitama, Japan
19:34 JST	Okazaki 43'; Kiyotake 58'; Mukhammad 63' (o.g.); Yoshida 74'; Kanazaki 78'	JFA Report		Stadium: Saitama Stadium 2002; Attendance: 48,967; Referee: Mohanad Qasim Sarray (Iraq)

29 March 2018 FIFA World Cup qualification (AFC) round 2	Japan	5–0	Syria	Saitama, Japan
19:34 JST	Al Masri 17' (o.g.); Kagawa 66', 90'; Honda 86'; Haraguchi 90+3'	AFC Report		Stadium: Saitama Stadium 2002; Attendance: 57,475; Referee: Alireza Faghani (Iran)

3 June Friendly (Kirin Cup Soccer 2016)	Japan	7–2	Bulgaria	Toyota, Japan
19:42 JST	Okazaki 4'; Kagawa 27', 35'; Yoshida 38', 53'; Usami 57'; Asano 87' (pen.)	JFA Report	Aleksandrov 59'; Chochev 82'	Stadium: Toyota Stadium; Attendance: 41,940; Referee: Bartosz Frankowski (Poland)

7 June Friendly (Kirin Cup Soccer 2016)	Japan	1–2	Bosnia and Herzegovina	Suita, Japan
19:34 JST	Kiyotake 28'	JFA Report	Đurić 29', 66'	Stadium: Suita City Football Stadium; Attendance: 35,589; Referee: Jarred Gillett (Australia)

1 September 2018 FIFA World Cup qualification (AFC) round 3	Japan	1–2	United Arab Emirates	Saitama, Japan
19:35 JST	Honda 11'	JFA Report	Khalil 20', 54' (pen.)	Stadium: Saitama Stadium 2002; Attendance: 58,895; Referee: Abdulrahman Al-Jassim (Qatar)

6 September 2018 FIFA World Cup qualification (AFC) round 3	Thailand	0–2	Japan	Bangkok, Thailand
19:15 UTC+7		AFC Report	Haraguchi 19'; Asano 75'	Stadium: Rajamangala Stadium; Attendance: 44,500; Referee: Mohsen Torky (Iran)

6 October 2018 FIFA World Cup qualification (AFC) round 3	Japan	2–1	Iraq	Saitama, Japan
19:35 JST	Haraguchi 26'; Yamaguchi 90+5'	JFA Report	Abdul-Amir 60'	Stadium: Saitama Stadium 2002; Attendance: 57,768; Referee: Kim Dong-jin (South Korea)

11 October 2018 FIFA World Cup qualification (AFC) round 3	Australia	1–1	Japan	Melbourne, Australia
20:00 UTC+11	Jedinak 52' (pen.)	AFC Report	Haraguchi 5'	Stadium: Docklands Stadium; Attendance: 48,460; Referee: Nawaf Shukralla (Bahrain)

11 November Friendly (Kirin Challenge Cup 2016)	Japan	4–0	Oman	Kashima, Japan
19:23 JST	Osako 32', 42'; Kiyotake 64' (pen.); Kobayashi 90+4'	JFA Report		Stadium: Kashima Soccer Stadium; Attendance: 33,709; Referee: Liu Kwok Man (Hong Kong)

15 November 2018 FIFA World Cup qualification (AFC) round 3	Japan	2–1	Saudi Arabia	Saitama, Japan
19:35 JST	Kiyotake 45' (pen.); Haraguchi 80'	JFA Report	Om. Hawsawi 90'	Stadium: Saitama Stadium 2002; Attendance: 58,420; Referee: Muhammad Taqi Aljaafari Bin Jahari (Singapore)

Win
Draw
Loss

=== Players statistics ===
Player	-2015	03.24	03.29	06.03	06.07	09.01	09.06	10.06	10.11	11.11	11.15	2016	Total
Shinji Okazaki	98(47)	O(1)	O	O(1)	O	O	-	O	-	O	O	8(2)	106(49)
Makoto Hasebe	95(2)	O	O	O	O	O	O	O	O	-	O	9(0)	104(2)
Yuto Nagatomo	86(3)	O	O	O	O	-	-	-	-	-	O	5(0)	91(3)
Keisuke Honda	79(34)	-	O(1)	-	-	O(1)	O	O	O	O	O	7(2)	86(36)
Shinji Kagawa	77(23)	O	O(2)	O(2)	-	O	O	-	O	-	O	7(4)	84(27)
Eiji Kawashima	71(0)	-	-	O	-	-	-	-	-	-	-	1(0)	72(0)
Maya Yoshida	61(6)	O(1)	O	O(2)	O	O	O	O	O	O	O	10(3)	71(9)
Hiroshi Kiyotake	33(1)	O(1)	O	O	O(1)	O	-	O	O	O(1)	O(1)	9(4)	42(5)
Masato Morishige	29(2)	O	O	O	O	O	O	O	O	O	O	10(0)	39(2)
Hiroki Sakai	25(0)	O	-	O	-	O	O	O	-	O	O	7(0)	32(0)
Gotoku Sakai	25(0)	-	O	-	O	O	O	O	O	O	-	7(0)	32(0)
Hotaru Yamaguchi	24(1)	-	O	-	-	-	O	O(1)	O	O	O	6(1)	30(2)
Shusaku Nishikawa	23(0)	-	O	-	O	O	O	O	O	O	O	8(0)	31(0)
Tomoaki Makino	22(2)	-	-	-	O	-	-	-	O	-	-	2(0)	24(2)
Yoshinori Muto	18(2)	-	-	-	-	-	O	-	-	-	-	1(0)	19(2)
Mike Havenaar	17(4)	O	-	-	-	-	-	-	-	-	-	1(0)	18(4)
Yuya Osako	15(3)	-	-	-	-	-	-	-	-	O(2)	O	2(2)	17(5)
Takashi Usami	13(2)	-	O	O(1)	O	O	O	-	-	-	-	5(1)	18(3)
Genki Haraguchi	11(1)	O	O(1)	O	-	O	O(1)	O(1)	O(1)	O	O(1)	9(5)	20(6)
Yosuke Kashiwagi	7(0)	O	-	O	O	-	-	O	-	-	-	4(0)	11(0)
Mu Kanazaki	6(1)	O(1)	O	O	O	-	-	-	-	-	-	4(1)	10(2)
Manabu Saito	5(1)	-	-	-	-	-	-	-	-	O	-	1(0)	6(1)
Wataru Endo	5(0)	-	-	O	O	-	-	-	-	-	-	2(0)	7(0)
Takuma Asano	3(0)	-	-	O(1)	O	O	O(1)	O	O	O	-	7(2)	10(2)
Yu Kobayashi	2(0)	O	-	O	O	-	O	O	O	-	-	6(0)	8(0)
Masaaki Higashiguchi	1(0)	O	-	-	-	-	-	-	-	-	-	1(0)	2(0)
Gen Shoji	1(0)	-	-	O	-	-	-	-	-	-	-	1(0)	2(0)
Yuki Kobayashi	0(0)	-	-	-	O	-	-	-	-	O(1)	-	2(1)	2(1)
Yuichi Maruyama	0(0)	-	-	-	-	-	-	-	O	O	-	2(0)	2(0)
Yuya Kubo	0(0)	-	-	-	-	-	-	-	-	O	O	2(0)	2(0)
Ryota Oshima	0(0)	-	-	-	-	O	-	-	-	-	-	1(0)	1(0)
Ryota Nagaki	0(0)	-	-	-	-	-	-	-	-	O	-	1(0)	1(0)

== National team (Women) ==
=== Results ===
2016.02.29	Japan	1–3	Australia	Osaka, Japan
	Ogimi ?'		? ?' ? ?' ? ?'	Stadium: Nagai Football Stadium

2016.03.02	Japan	1–1	South Korea	Osaka, Japan
	Iwabuchi ?'		? ?'	Stadium: Nagai Football Stadium

2016.03.04	Japan	1–2	China	Osaka, Japan
	Yokoyama ?'		? ?' ? ?'	Stadium: Nagai Football Stadium

2016.03.07	Japan	6–1	Vietnam	Osaka, Japan
	Iwabuchi ?'; Ono ?'; Kawasumi ?'; Nakajima ?'; Yokoyama ?'; Ogimi ?'		? ?'	Stadium: Nagai Football Stadium

2016.03.09	Japan	1–0	North Korea	Osaka, Japan
	Iwabuchi ?'			Stadium: Nagai Football Stadium

2016.06.02	Japan	3–3	United States	United States
	Iwabuchi ?'; Ogimi ?'; Yokoyama ?'		? ?' ? ?' ? ?'

2016.06.05	Japan	0–2	United States	United States
			? ?' ? ?'

2016.07.21	Japan	0–3	Sweden	Sweden
			? ?' ? ?' ? ?'

=== Players statistics ===
Player	-2015	02.29	03.02	03.04	03.07	03.09	06.02	06.05	07.21	2016	Total
Aya Miyama	157(38)	O	O	O	O	O	-	-	-	5(0)	162(38)
Shinobu Ono	137(39)	O	-	-	O(1)	-	-	-	-	2(1)	139(40)
Yuki Nagasato	125(55)	O(1)	O	O	O(1)	O	O(1)	-	O	7(3)	132(58)
Azusa Iwashimizu	119(11)	O	-	-	O	O	-	-	-	3(0)	122(11)
Mizuho Sakaguchi	97(28)	O	-	O	-	O	O	O	O	6(0)	103(28)
Yukari Kinga	97(5)	-	O	O	-	O	-	-	-	3(0)	100(5)
Rumi Utsugi	87(5)	-	-	-	-	-	O	O	O	3(0)	90(5)
Miho Fukumoto	79(0)	-	O	O	-	-	-	-	-	2(0)	81(0)
Nahomi Kawasumi	78(19)	O	O	O	O(1)	-	-	-	-	4(1)	82(20)
Saki Kumagai	74(0)	O	O	O	-	O	O	O	O	7(0)	81(0)
Aya Sameshima	69(4)	O	-	O	-	O	-	-	-	3(0)	72(4)
Megumi Takase	58(9)	-	-	O	O	O	-	-	-	3(0)	61(9)
Saori Ariyoshi	42(1)	O	O	-	O	O	O	O	O	7(0)	49(1)
Yuika Sugasawa	38(10)	-	-	-	-	-	-	O	-	1(0)	39(10)
Asuna Tanaka	36(3)	-	O	O	O	-	-	-	-	3(0)	39(3)
Megumi Kamionobe	32(2)	-	O	-	O	-	-	-	-	2(0)	34(2)
Mana Iwabuchi	30(4)	O	O(1)	O	O(1)	O(1)	O(1)	O	-	7(4)	37(8)
Emi Nakajima	24(6)	O	O	O	O(1)	O	O	O	-	7(1)	31(7)
Yuri Kawamura	21(2)	O	O	O	O	O	O	O	O	8(0)	29(2)
Erina Yamane	18(0)	O	-	-	-	O	-	O	-	3(0)	21(0)
Rika Masuya	10(3)	-	-	-	-	-	O	O	O	3(0)	13(3)
Kumi Yokoyama	5(2)	O	O	O(1)	O(1)	O	O(1)	O	O	8(3)	13(5)
Saori Arimachi	5(0)	-	-	-	-	-	-	-	O	1(0)	6(0)
Ami Sugita	4(2)	-	-	-	-	-	-	O	-	1(0)	5(2)
Ayaka Yamashita	3(0)	-	-	-	O	-	O	-	O	3(0)	6(0)
Tomoko Muramatsu	2(0)	-	-	-	-	-	O	-	O	2(0)	4(0)
Mayu Sasaki	0(0)	-	-	-	-	-	O	O	O	3(0)	3(0)
Sonoko Chiba	0(0)	-	-	-	-	-	O	O	O	3(0)	3(0)
Yu Nakasato	0(0)	-	-	-	-	-	O	O	O	3(0)	3(0)
Hikari Takagi	0(0)	-	-	-	-	-	-	O	-	1(0)	1(0)
