= 2012 Emperor's Cup =

Tournament details
- Country: Japan

Final positions
- Champions: Kashiwa Reysol (3rd title)
- Runners-up: Gamba Osaka

Tournament statistics
- Matches played: 87

The 92nd Emperor's Cup (第92回天皇杯全日本サッカー選手権大会) was a regular edition of an annual Japanese national cup tournament. It started on 1 September 2012 and ended on 1 January 2013 with the final at National Stadium in Tokyo, Japan, won by Kashiwa Reysol 1–0 against Gamba Osaka.

The cup winners were guaranteed a place in the 2013 AFC Champions League. However, as a requirement of AFC in 2012, the spot is only issued if the team holds a J1 license (but not necessary being a Division 1 team).

== Calendar ==
Round	Date	Matches	Clubs	New entries this round
First round	September 1, 2	24	47+1 → 24	47 prefectural cup winners; 1 JFL seeded club (*)
Second round	September 8, 9	32	24+18+22 → 32	18 J1 clubs; 22 J2 clubs
Third round	October 10	16	32 → 16	
Fourth Round	December 15	8	16 → 8	
Quarterfinals	December 23	4	8 → 4	
Semifinals	December 29	2	4 → 2	
Final	January 1, 2013	1	2 → 1	

- The collegiate champion no longer qualifies for the Emperor Cup. Though, they may still enter the Emperor Cup if they won the prefectural cup.
- The highest ranked Japan Football League (JFL) club after the 17th match day (June 24) is to qualify for the tournament.
- December 19 was reserved for at most 1 game of Fourth Round in case of event clashes due to 2012 FIFA Club World Cup. As Sanfrecce Hiroshima, the team playing the Club World Cup was already eliminated in Emperor Cup on Second Round, the event was not postponed.

== Participating clubs ==
=== Starting in the First round ===
Prefectural cup winners – 47 teams

- Hokkaidō – Sapporo University
- Aomori – Vanraure Hachinohe
- Iwate – Grulla Morioka
- Miyagi – Sony Sendai
- Akita – Blaublitz Akita
- Yamagata – Nihon University Yamagata High School
- Fukushima – Fukushima United
- Ibaraki – University of Tsukuba
- Tochigi – Vertfee Takahara Nasu
- Gunma – Tonan Maebashi
- Saitama – Heisei International University
- Chiba – Kashiwa Reysol U-18
- Tokyo – Yokogawa Musashino
- Kanagawa – YSCC Yokohama
- Yamanashi – Yamanashi Gakuin University Orions
- Nagano – Nagano Parceiro
- Niigata – Niigata University of Management
- Toyama – Toyama Shinjo Club
- Ishikawa – Zweigen Kanazawa
- Fukui – Saurcos Fukui
- Shizuoka – Hamamatsu University
- Aichi – FC Kariya
- Mie – Suzuka Rampole
- Gifu – FC Gifu Second
- Shiga – Sagawa Shiga
- Kyoto – Amitie SC
- Osaka – Kansai University
- Hyōgo – Kwansei Gakuin University
- Nara – Nara Club
- Wakayama – Arterivo Wakayama
- Tottori – Yonago Kita High School
- Shimane – Matsue City FC
- Okayama – Fagiano Okayama Next
- Hiroshima – Fukuyama University
- Yamaguchi – Tokuyama University
- Kagawa – Kamatamare Sanuki
- Tokushima – Panasonic Energy Tokushima
- Ehime – FC Imabari
- Kochi – Kochi University
- Fukuoka – Fukuoka University
- Saga – Saga University
- Nagasaki – Nagasaki Institute of Applied Science High School (*1)
- Kumamoto – Ohzu High School
- Ōita – Hoyo Oita
- Miyazaki – Miyazaki Sangyo-keiei University
- Kagoshima – Volca Kagoshima
- Okinawa – FC Ryukyu

(*1) The team was the prefectural runners-up; Both Nagasaki Prefectural Cup finalists qualified for the final tournament, after the other finalist, V-Varen Nagasaki, had qualified to the Emperor's Cup as the JFL seeded club.

JFL seeded club – 1 team
V-Varen Nagasaki

=== Starting in the Second round ===
J.League Division 1 – 18 teams

- Consadole Sapporo
- Vegalta Sendai
- Kashima Antlers
- Kashiwa Reysol
- Omiya Ardija
- Urawa Red Diamonds
- FC Tokyo
- Kawasaki Frontale
- Yokohama F. Marinos
- Shimizu S-Pulse
- Júbilo Iwata
- Nagoya Grampus
- Albirex Niigata
- Cerezo Osaka
- Gamba Osaka
- Vissel Kobe
- Sanfrecce Hiroshima
- Sagan Tosu

J.League Division 2 – 22 teams

- Montedio Yamagata
- Mito HollyHock
- Tochigi SC
- Thespa Kusatsu
- JEF United Chiba
- Tokyo Verdy
- Machida Zelvia
- Yokohama FC
- Shonan Bellmare
- Ventforet Kofu
- Matsumoto Yamaga
- Kataller Toyama
- FC Gifu
- Kyoto Sanga
- Fagiano Okayama
- Gainare Tottori
- Tokushima Vortis
- Ehime FC
- Giravanz Kitakyushu
- Avispa Fukuoka
- Roasso Kumamoto
- Oita Trinita

== Drawing ==
Since this year, the drawing of the tournament was held twice: The first draw determined the pairings of first to third round matches; the second draw was held after the third round that determined the pairings of the fourth round to the final.

== Matches ==
=== First round ===
1 September 2012
13:00

Vertfee Takahara Nasu	1–3	Kashiwa Reysol U-18
	report

Tochigi City Athletic Stadium, Tochigi

1 September 2012
13:00

Sapporo University	0–3	Nagano Parceiro
	report

Sapporo Atsubetsu Park Stadium, Sapporo

2 September 2012
13:00

Grulla Morioka	0–2	Yokogawa Musashino
	report

Morioka Park Stadium, Morioka

1 September 2012
13:00

Suzuka Rampole	1–0	Hamamatsu University
	report

Suzuka Sports Garden, Suzuka

1 September 2012
13:00

Sagawa Shiga	6–0	Kwansei Gakuin University
	report

Nunobiki Green Stadium, Higashiōmi

1 September 2012
13:00

Ohzu High School	0–2	V-Varen Nagasaki
	report

Kumamoto Athletics Stadium, Kumamoto

2 September 2012
13:00

Kochi University	0–1	Sony Sendai
	report

Kochi Haruno Athletic Stadium, Haruno

2 September 2012
13:00

Blaublitz Akita	1–0	Heisei International University
	report

Akita Yabase Stadium, Akita

1 September 2012
13:00

Miyazaki Sangyo-keiei University	0–1 (a.e.t.)	Fukuoka University
	report

Miyazaki Ikime no Mori Ivy Stadium, Miyazaki

2 September 2012
13:00

Vanraure Hachinohe	0–2	YSCC Yokohama
	report

Takamoriyama Sports Park, Towada

2 September 2012
13:00

Nara Club	2–1	Amitie SC
	report

Kashihara Public Garden Nara Prefectural Stadium, Kashihara

1 September 2012
13:00

Tonan Maebashi	5–0	Nihon University Yamagata High School
	report

Gunma Shikishima Soccer Stadium, Maebashi

2 September 2012
13:00

Zweigen Kanazawa	0–1	FC Kariya
	report

Ishikawa Kanazawa Stadium, Kanazawa

2 September 2012
13:00

Saga University	0–5	Kamatamare Sanuki
	report

Saga Stadium, Saga

2 September 2012
13:00

Yonago Kita High School	1–2	Volca Kagoshima
	report

Tottori Bank Bird Stadium, Tottori

2 September 2012
13:00

Fukuyama University	1–2 (a.e.t.)	FC Imabari
	report

Kure Gohara Stadium, Kure

2 September 2012
13:00

Arterivo Wakayama	2–1 (a.e.t.)	FC Gifu Second
	report

Kinokawa Athletic Stadium, Kinokawa

1 September 2012
13:00

Hoyo Oita	3–0	Nagasaki Institute of Applied Science High School
	report

Saiki Athletic Stadium, Saiki

1 September 2012
13:00

Kansai University	3–2	Toyama Shinjo Club
	report

Kincho Stadium, Osaka

1 September 2012
13:00

Saurcos Fukui	3–0	Niigata University of Management
	report

Technoport Fukui Stadium, Sakai

1 September 2012
13:00

Yamanashi Gakuin University Orions	0–10	Fukushima United
	report

Yamanashi Chuo Bank Stadium, Kōfu

1 September 2012
13:00

University of Tsukuba	3–1 (a.e.t.)	FC Ryukyu
	report

Kasamatsu Stadium, Naka

1 September 2012
13:00

Matsue City FC	0–3	Tokuyama University
	report

Shimane Hamayama Stadium, Izumo

2 September 2012
13:00

Fagiano Okayama Next	4–0	Panasonic Energy Tokushima
	report

Kanko Stadium, Okayama

=== Second round ===
8 September 2012
13:00

Kashiwa Reysol	3–0	Kashiwa Reysol U-18
Leandro Domingues 14', 45+1'; Sawa 47'	report

Hitachi Kashiwa Soccer Stadium, Kashiwa
Attendance: 4,712
Referee: Hiroyuki Kimura

8 September 2012
13:00

Shonan Bellmare	1–0	Ehime FC
Otsuki 48'	report

Shonan BMW Stadium Hiratsuka, Hiratsuka
Attendance: 1,478
Referee: Masuya Ueda

8 September 2012
13:00

Consadole Sapporo	1–1 (a.e.t.)	Nagano Parceiro
Uehara 69'	report	Mukai 8'
Penalties
	3–5

Sapporo Atsubetsu Park Stadium, Sapporo
Attendance: 2,535
Referee: Ryoichi Imamura

9 September 2012
13:00

FC Tokyo	0–1	Yokogawa Musashino
	report	Keisuke Iwata 90+2'

Ajinomoto Stadium, Chōfu
Attendance: 7,287
Referee: Tetsuro Yoshida

9 September 2012
13:00

Júbilo Iwata	7–0	Suzuka Rampole
17' (o.g.); Kobayashi 40'; Oshitani 48'; Yamazaki 54', 61'; Han Sang-woon 66'; Yoshiro Abe 90+1'	report

Yamaha Stadium, Iwata
Attendance: 2,808
Referee: Toshimitsu Yoshida

8 September 2012
15:00

Matsumoto Yamaga FC	1–3	Kyoto Sanga FC
Kusunose 64'	report	Kudo 4'; Komai 13'; Nakayama 83'

Matsumotodaira Football Stadium, Matsumoto
Attendance: 6,317
Referee: Koji Morikawa

8 September 2012
13:00

Vissel Kobe	1–2	Sagawa Shiga
Lee 42'	report	Shimada 11'; Shohei Kiyohara 55'

Himeji Athletic Stadium, Himeji
Attendance: 4,102
Referee: Yudai Yamamoto

9 September 2012
13:00

JEF United Ichihara Chiba	1–0	V-Varen Nagasaki
Otsuka 36'	report

Fukuda Denshi Arena, Chiba
Attendance: 3,207
Referee: Ryoichi Imamura

8 September 2012
13:00

Vegalta Sendai	1–0	Sony Sendai
Okuno 39'	report

Yurtec Stadium Sendai, Sendai
Attendance: 4,875
Referee: Tomohiro Inoue

8 September 2012
13:00

Roasso Kumamoto	4–3 (a.e.t.)	FC Gifu
Taketomi 11', 93'; Nakama 74'; Osako 112'	report	Higuchi 48', 64'; Danilo 95'

Kumamoto Athletics Stadium, Kumamoto
Attendance: 1,823
Referee: Haruki Hidaka

9 September 2012
13:00

Omiya Ardija	2–0	Blaublitz Akita
Carlinhos 45+4'; Cho Young-Cheol 68'	report

Kumagaya Athletic Stadium, Kumagaya
Attendance: 1,439
Referee: Nobutsugu Murakami

9 September 2012
13:00

Avispa Fukuoka	4–2	Fukuoka University
Jogo 7', 44'; Osmar 59'; Samir 71'	report	Kazuto Kishida 41'; Shohei Kishida 76'

Level-5 Stadium, Fukuoka
Attendance: 2,277
Referee: Naohito Ogawa

8 September 2012
13:00

Yokohama F. Marinos	4–2	YSCC Yokohama
Ono 33'; Nakamachi 52'; Marquinhos 69'; Matsumoto 86'	report	Akio Yoshida 66'; Masao Tsuji 90+3'

Nippatsu Mitsuzawa Stadium, Yokohama
Attendance: 4,201
Referee: Takuto Okabe

8 September 2012
13:00

Tochigi SC	0–1 (a.e.t.)	Yokohama FC
	report	Kaio 112'

Tochigi Green Stadium, Utsunomiya
Attendance: 1,731
Referee: Kenta Tsukada

8 September 2012
13:00

Cerezo Osaka	4–0	Nara Club
Kempes 25'; Yamaguchi 59'; Kenyu Sugimoto 83', 86'	report

Kincho Stadium, Osaka
Attendance: 3,123
Referee: Ryuji Sato

8 September 2012
13:00

Montedio Yamagata	3–0	Tonan Maebashi
Hayashi 47'; Nishikawa 48'; Nakashima 90+2'	report

ND Soft Stadium Yamagata, Tendō
Attendance: 2,118
Referee: Hiromichi Oka

9 September 2012
13:00

Fagiano Okayama	2–0	Kataller Toyama
Tiago 55'; Goto 77'	report

Kanko Stadium, Okayama
Attendance: 3,277
Referee: Akihiko Ikeuchi

8 September 2012
15:00

Nagoya Grampus	2–0	FC Kariya
Masukawa 58'; Ogawa 66'	report

Technoport Fukui Stadium, Sakai
Attendance: 3,120
Referee: Koichiro Fukushima

9 September 2012
13:00

Sagan Tosu	0–1	Kamatamare Sanuki
	report	Nishino 90+2'

Best Amenity Stadium, Tosu
Attendance: 3,091
Referee: Takuya Maeda

8 September 2012
13:00

Urawa Red Diamonds	2–1	Volca Kagoshima
Tanaka 30'; Popó 48'	report	Kuriyama 9'

Urawa Komaba Stadium, Saitama
Attendance: 8,975
Referee: Hiroyoshi Takayama

8 September 2012
15:00

Sanfrecce Hiroshima	1–2	FC Imabari
Sato 75'	report	Ryusei Morikawa 3'; Daiki Takada 87'

Fukuyama Takegahana Stadium, Fukuyama
Attendance: 4, 021
Referee: Masaaki Iemoto

9 September 2012
13:00

F.C. Machida Zelvia	1–1 (a.e.t.)	Giravanz Kitakyushu
Kitai 22'	report	Tokiwa 51'
Penalties
	5–4

Komazawa Olympic Park Stadium, Setagaya
Attendance: 1,653
Referee: Shoichiro Mikami

8 September 2012
13:00

Shimizu S-Pulse	5–0	Arterivo Wakayama
Shirasaki 2', 25', 80'; Ito 68'; Kashiwase 90+1'	report

Outsourcing Stadium Nihondaira, Shizuoka
Attendance: 2,864
Referee: Kenji Ogiya

8 September 2012
13:00

Tokyo Verdy	3–0	Hoyo Oita
Kajikawa 18'; Iio 32'; França 90+4'	report

Ajinomoto Field Nishigaoka, Kita
Attendance: 1,093
Referee: Kazuyuki Hayakawa

8 September 2012
13:00

Gamba Osaka	3–0	Kansai University
Yokotani 2'; Myojin 39'; Abe 47'	report

Osaka Expo '70 Stadium, Suita
Attendance: 2,227
Referee: Junpei Iida

9 September 2012
13:00

Oita Trinita	2–2 (a.e.t.)	Mito HollyHock
Marutani 13', 58'	report	Dai 75'; Hashimoto 90+2'
Penalties
	3–5

Ōita Bank Dome, Ōita
Attendance: 2,515
Referee: Taku Nagaya

9 September 2012
13:00

Albirex Niigata	2–1 (a.e.t.)	Saurcos Fukui
Bruno Lopes 56', 105+1'	report	Yusuke Sakai 45+2'

Niigata City Athletic Stadium, Niigata
Attendance: 3,116
Referee: Yuichi Nishimura

8 September 2012
13:00

Ventforet Kofu	0–0 (a.e.t.)	Fukushima United
	report
Penalties
	3–4

Yamanashi Chuo Bank Stadium, Kōfu
Attendance: 2,004
Referee: Yuki Noda

8 September 2012
13:00

Kashima Antlers	7–1	University of Tsukuba
Endo 35', 38', 72'; Juninho 53'; Aoki 69'; Okamoto 76'; Shoji 84'	report	Shuhei Akasaki 90+3'

Kashima Soccer Stadium, Kashima
Attendance: 3,191
Referee: Minoru Tojo

9 September 2012
13:00

Gainare Tottori	2–1	Thespa Kusatsu
Ozaki 52'; Sumida 72'	report	Hayashi 72'

Tottori Bank Bird Stadium, Tottori
Attendance: 2,031
Referee: Kazuyoshi Enomoto

8 September 2012
13:00

Kawasaki Frontale	2–0	Tokuyama University
Yamase 49', 77'	report

Todoroki Athletics Stadium, Kawasaki
Attendance: 2,882
Referee: Itaru Hirose

8 September 2012
13:00

Tokushima Vortis	5–1	Fagiano Okayama Next
Douglas 33'; Tsuda 50'; Hamada 63'; Nasukawa 80'; Ota 90+1'	report	Nakano 88'

Pocarisweat Stadium, Naruto
Attendance: 948
Referee: Tomohiro Tsukada

=== Third round ===
10 October 2012
19:00

Kashiwa Reysol (1)	2–1	Shonan Bellmare (2)
Tanaka 30'; Neto Baiano 90+2'	report	Otsuki 15'

Hitachi Kashiwa Soccer Stadium, Kashiwa
Attendance: 3,449
Referee: Inoue

10 October 2012
19:00

Nagano Parceiro (3)	0–0 (a.e.t.)	Yokogawa Musashino (3)
	report
Penalties
Yuji Unozawa (penalty missed); Shogo Matsuo (penalty scored); Shinichi Mukai (penalty scored); Kenichi Nozawa (penalty scored); Yoshitaka Ohashi (penalty scored); Yosuke Terada (penalty scored); Keita Tanaka (penalty scored); Kohei Takano (penalty scored); Takahiro Oshima (penalty scored); Yuki Kawabe (penalty scored); Yudai Suwa (penalty missed)	9–10	(penalty scored) Keisuke Iwata; (penalty scored) Shunsuke Hayashi; (penalty scored) Tatsuya Sekino; (penalty missed) Takanori Kanamori; (penalty scored) Masaaki Yabe; (penalty scored) Daiki Koyama; (penalty scored) Sho Kaseyama; (penalty scored) Daigo Tomioka; (penalty scored) Shu Hiraiwa; (penalty scored) Ryoya Ueda; (penalty scored) Kaijiro Fujiyoshi

Sapporo Atsubetsu Park Stadium, Sapporo
Attendance: 312
Referee: Tojo

10 October 2012
19:00

Júbilo Iwata (1)	1–1 (a.e.t.)	Kyoto Sanga FC (2)
Yamamoto 109'	report	Nakamura 120'
Penalties
Ryohei Yamazaki (penalty scored); Hiroki Yamada (penalty scored); Kosuke Yamamoto (penalty scored); Rodrigo Souto (penalty scored); Jo Kanazawa (penalty scored)	5–3	(penalty scored) Jun Ando; (penalty scored) Kazuki Hara; (penalty scored) Atsutaka Nakamura; (penalty missed) Shun Nagasawa

Yamaha Stadium, Iwata
Attendance: 2,756
Referee: Matsuo

10 October 2012
19:00

Sagawa Shiga (3)	1–1 (a.e.t.)	JEF United Ichihara Chiba (2)
Gokyu 69'	report	Ricardo Lobo 47' (pen.)
Penalties
Yuya Toorikai (penalty missed); Shohei Kiyohara (penalty scored); Shinya Hatate (penalty missed); Yuta Narawa (penalty scored); Hideyuki Takeya (penalty scored); Shōgo Shimada (penalty scored); Yusuke Kushibiki (penalty scored); Tatsuya Nakamura (penalty scored); Masato Osugi (penalty missed)	6–7	(penalty scored) Masataka Sakamoto; (penalty scored) Koki Yonekura; (penalty scored) Eijiro Takeda; (penalty missed) Ryota Aoki; (penalty missed) Kei Yamaguchi; (penalty scored) Daisuke Ito; (penalty scored) Sho Sato; (penalty scored) Haruya Ide; (penalty scored) Akira Toshima

Home's Stadium Kobe, Kobe
Attendance: 615
Referee: Okabe

10 October 2012
19:00

Vegalta Sendai (1)	1–2 (a.e.t.)	Roasso Kumamoto (2)
Watanabe 64'	report	Saito 48'; Yabu 119'

Yurtec Stadium Sendai, Sendai
Attendance: 4,269
Referee: Nishimura

10 October 2012
19:00

Omiya Ardija (1)	3–1	Avispa Fukuoka (2)
Hasegawa 45'; Zlatan 54'; Novaković 87'	report	Osmar 66'

Kumagaya Athletic Stadium, Kumagaya
Attendance: 1,212
Referee: Yoshida

10 October 2012
19:00

Yokohama F. Marinos (1)	2–1	Yokohama FC (2)
Nakamura 25', 48'	report	Watanabe 58'

Nissan Stadium, Yokohama
Attendance: 8,862
Referee: Murakami

10 October 2012
19:00

Cerezo Osaka (1)	2–1	Montedio Yamagata (2)
Sugimoto 59'; Fujimoto 89'	report	Maeda 50'

Kincho Stadium, Osaka
Attendance: 3,804
Referee: Iemoto

10 October 2012
19:00

Fagiano Okayama (2)	2–3	Nagoya Grampus (1)
Sengoku 39'; Sekido 75'	report	Tulio 46', 90+1' (pen.); Nagai 62'

Toyama Athletic Stadium, Toyama
Attendance: 2,102
Referee: Imamura

10 October 2012
19:00

Kamatamare Sanuki (3)	1–2	Urawa Red Diamonds (1)
Nishino 88'	report	Yajima 75'; Popó 90+3'

Saga Stadium, Saga
Attendance: 1,583
Referee: Iida

10 October 2012
19:00

FC Imabari (4)	2–5	FC Machida Zelvia (2)
Kitabayashi 44'; Okamoto 71'	report	Ota 36', 70'; Kitai 47', 65'; Dimić 90+4'

Hiroshima Big Arch Football Ground 1, Hiroshima
Attendance: 304
Referee: Hirose

Note: The venue was changed on 21 September, originally planned to be Hiroshima Big Arch Main Stadium.

10 October 2012
19:00

Shimizu S-Pulse (1)	1–0	Tokyo Verdy (2)
Shirasaki 54'	report

Outsourcing Stadium Nihondaira, Shizuoka
Attendance: 3,223
Referee: Sato

10 October 2012
19:00

Gamba Osaka (1)	1–0	Mito HollyHock (2)
Leandro 62'	report

Osaka Expo '70 Stadium, Suita
Attendance: 2,537
Referee: Tetsuro Yoshida

10 October 2012
19:00

Albirex Niigata (1)	0–1	Fukushima United (4)
	report	Masuko 63'

Tohoku Electric Power Big Swan Stadium, Niigata
Attendance: 3,460
Referee: Fukushima

10 October 2012
19:00

Kashima Antlers (1)	2–1 (a.e.t.)	Gainare Tottori (2)
Masuda 40'; Koroki 110'	report	Mio 75'

Kashima Soccer Stadium, Kashima
Attendance: 2,606
Referee: Kimura

10 October 2012
19:00

Kawasaki Frontale (1)	3–2 (a.e.t.)	Tokushima Vortis (2)
Renato 26', 120+1'; Kusukami 78'	report	Alex 24'; Tsuda 90+1'

Todoroki Athletics Stadium, Kawasaki
Attendance: 3,710
Referee: Yamamoto

=== Fourth round ===
15 December 2012
13:00

Gamba Osaka (1)	3–2	FC Machida Zelvia (2)
Kurata 38'; Iwashita 65'; Endō 80'	Report	Kitai 27'; Suzuki 56'

Osaka Expo '70 Stadium, Suita
Attendance: 4,576
Referee: Yamamoto

15 December 2012
17:00

Cerezo Osaka (1)	4–0	Shimizu S-Pulse (1)
Minamino 24'; Yamaguchi 53'; Sugimoto 83'; Murata 90'	Report

Nagai Stadium, Osaka
Attendance: 6,547
Referee: Hirose

15 December 2012
13:00

JEF United Ichihara Chiba (2)	5–0	Fukushima United (4)
Shunsuke 14' (o.g.); Yazawa 25'; Fujita 77'; Toshima 82'; Hyodo 88'	Report

Fukuda Denshi Arena, Chiba
Attendance: 5,238
Referee: Imamura

15 December 2012
13:00

Kashima Antlers (1)	3–1	Júbilo Iwata (1)
Iwamasa 5'; Dutra 14'; Juninho 25'	Report	Maeda 1'

Kashima Soccer Stadium, Kashima
Attendance: 7,522
Referee: Iida

15 December 2012
16:00

Urawa Red Diamonds (1)	0–2	Yokohama F. Marinos (1)
	Report	Hyodo 28'; Kano 49'

Kumagaya Athletic Stadium, Kumagaya
Attendance: 12,634
Referee: Sato

15 December 2012
15:00

Nagoya Grampus (1)	5–2	Roasso Kumamoto (2)
H. Tanaka 15'; Kanazaki 43'; Ogawa 65'; Nagai 78'; Tamada 85'	Report	Saito 24', 44'

Mizuho Athletic Stadium, Nagoya
Attendance: 4,125
Referee: Matsuo

15 December 2012
13:00

Omiya Ardija (1)	4–3	Kawasaki Frontale (1)
Novakovic 63', 90'; Higashi 67', 86'	Report	Kobayashi 6', 26'; Renato 38'

Ōmiya Park Soccer Stadium, Ōmiya-ku
Attendance: 7,503
Referee: Kimura

15 December 2012
13:00

Kashiwa Reysol (1)	1–0	Yokogawa Musashino (3)
Tanaka 24'	Report

Hitachi Kashiwa Soccer Stadium, Kashiwa
Attendance: 5,298
Referee: Takayama

=== Quarter-finals ===
23 December 2012
13:00

Cerezo Osaka (1)	1–2 (a.e.t.)	Gamba Osaka (1)
Kakitani 49'	Report	Endō 19'; Ienaga 112'

Nagai Stadium, Osaka
Attendance: 21,407
Referee: Matsuo

23 December 2012
15:00

JEF United Ichihara Chiba (2)	0–1	Kashima Antlers (1)
	Report	Osako 64'

Ajinomoto Stadium, Chofu
Attendance: 12,843
Referee: Sato

23 December 2012
13:00

Nagoya Grampus (1)	0–0 (a.e.t.)	Yokohama F. Marinos (1)
	Report
Penalties
Fujimoto (penalty missed); Isomura (penalty scored); Taguchi (penalty scored); Tulio (penalty scored); Tamada (penalty scored); Nagai (penalty scored); Abe (penalty scored); H. Tanaka (penalty missed)	6–7	(penalty scored) Nakamura; (penalty scored) Hyodo; (penalty scored) Marquinhos; (penalty scored) Nakamachi; (penalty missed) Ono; (penalty scored) Kurihara; (penalty scored) Tomisawa; (penalty scored) Nakazawa

Mizuho Athletic Stadium, Nagoya
Attendance: 10,043
Referee: Toma

23 December 2012
13:00

Omiya Ardija (1)	2–3	Kashiwa Reysol (1)
Ueda 11'; Cho 23'	Report	Sawa 59'; Masushima 83'; Kudo 90'

Kumagaya Athletic Stadium, Kumagaya
Attendance: 7,090
Referee: Nishimura

=== Semi-finals ===
29 December 2012
13:00

Gamba Osaka (1)	1–0	Kashima Antlers (1)
Endō 23'

Shizuoka Stadium, Fukuroi
Attendance: 8,978
Referee: Murakami

29 December 2012
15:00

Yokohama F. Marinos (1)	0–1	Kashiwa Reysol (1)
		Kudo 23'

National Olympic Stadium, Shinjuku
Attendance: 21,267
Referee: Ogiya

=== Final ===
1 January 2013
14:05

Gamba Osaka (1)	0–1	Kashiwa Reysol (1)
		Watanabe 35'

National Olympic Stadium, Shinjuku
Attendance: 46,480
Referee: Yoshida
