= 2014 AC Nagano Parceiro season =

AC Nagano Parceiro
2014 season
- Manager: Naohiko Minobe
- Stadium: Nagano Athletic Stadium
- J3 League: 2nd
Home colours	Away colours

AC Nagano Parceiro ( AC長野パルセイロ ) was one of the twelve teams chosen (the 'original-11', plus the J-League under 22 selection squad) to participate in the 2014 inaugural season of the professional J3 League Japanese football competition. They were one of only four teams in the league licensed for the J2 League, and therefore eligible to promotion to J2 at the end of the season.

One of the major qualifications for obtaining the J2 league licence was the development of a suitable stadium. With construction of the new stadium beginning in early 2014, AC Nagano Paceiro played their home games for the season at Saku City Athletic Stadium, and Nagano Athletic Stadium. The new 15,491 capacity stadium was originally scheduled to be completed in 2016, but the project was shorted to just 8 months so that the club could use the stadium in the event that they were promoted to the J2 League.

The regular 2014 season consisted of 33 rounds, played between March 9, 2014, and November 23, 2014, with a two leg home and away relegation series played on November 30, 2014, and December 7, 2014.

Having placed second by the end of the regular season, AC Nagano Parceiro took part on the relegation series against the second lowest ranking J2 team, Kamatamare Sanuki. The first game, played at home was a 0:0 draw, and the second game, played away, was won 1:0 by Kamatamare Sanuki, meaning that AC Nagano Parceiro remained in the J3 League for the 2015 season.

== 2014 squad ==
This was the squad as of February 17, 2014 Note: Flags indicate national team as defined under FIFA eligibility rules; some limited exceptions apply. Players may hold more than one non-FIFA nationality.

No.	Pos.	Nation	Player
1	GK	JPN	Yudai Suwa
2	DF	JPN	Yuki Matsubara
3	DF	JPN	Takahiro Oshima
4	DF	JPN	Yuki Kawabe
5	MF	JPN	Yoshitaka Ohashi
6	DF	JPN	Shinya Hatate
7	FW	JPN	Yuki Sato
8	MF	JPN	Keita Tanaka
9	FW	JPN	Shunta Takahashi
10	FW	JPN	Yuji Unozawa
11	MF	JPN	Naoki Hatada
13	FW	JPN	Yoshinori Katsumata
14	DF	JPN	Kohei Takano
15	DF	JPN	Ryo Nishiguchi
16	MF	JPN	Kota Sameshima
17	FW	JPN	Shogo Matsuo

No.	Pos.	Nation	Player
18	DF	JPN	Ryosuke Kawanabe
19	MF	JPN	Shinichi Mukai
20	MF	JPN	Kenichi Nozawa
21	GK	KOR	Kim Yeong-Gi
22	FW	JPN	Kazuki Mine
23	MF	JPN	Kanta Inoue
24	MF	JPN	Minato Yoshida
25	MF	JPN	Kazuki Arinaga
26	MF	JPN	Yuta Shimomura
27	MF	KOR	Ko Kyung-Te
28	DF	JPN	Yuta Tsunami
29	FW	JPN	Masahide Hiraoka
30	MF	JPN	Teruyoshi Ito
31	GK	JPN	Kengo Tanaka

== League table ==
Pos	Team	Pld	W	D	L	GF	GA	GD	Pts	Promotion or relegation
1	Zweigen Kanazawa (C, P)	33	23	6	4	56	20	+36	75	Promotion to 2015 J2 League (Note: Only clubs that hold J2 licence are eligible for promotion.)
2	Nagano Parceiro	33	20	9	4	58	23	+35	69	Qualification for J2 promotion playoffs
3	Machida Zelvia	33	20	8	5	59	22	+37	68	
4	Gainare Tottori	33	14	11	8	34	25	+9	53	
5	Grulla Morioka	33	12	9	12	43	39	+4	45	

Source: J.League
Rules for classification: 1) Points; 2) Goal differential; 3) Goals scored; 4) Head-to-head results; 5) Disciplinary points; 6) Draw.
(C) Champions; (P) Promoted

== AC Nagano Parceiro 2014 J3 Matches ==
Match	Date	Team	Score	Team	Venue	Attendance
1	2014.03.09	AC Nagano Parceiro	1-0	Fukushima United FC	Ajinomoto Field Nishigaoka	4,312
2	2014.03.16	FC Machida Zelvia	0-0	AC Nagano Parceiro	Machida Stadium	3,416
3	2014.03.23	AC Nagano Parceiro	2-1	Zweigen Kanazawa	Saku Athletic Stadium	3,073
4	2014.03.30	AC Nagano Parceiro	1-4	Fujieda MYFC	Saku Athletic Stadium	1,655
5	2014.04.06	Gainare Tottori	1-1	AC Nagano Parceiro	Tottori Bank Bird Stadium	1,832
6	2014.04.13	AC Nagano Parceiro	0-0	YSCC Yokohama	Saku Athletic Stadium	2,235
7	2014.04.20	Grulla Morioka	0-0	AC Nagano Parceiro	Morioka Minami Park Stadium	1,200
8	2014.04.26	AC Nagano Parceiro	1-0	FC Ryukyu	Saku Athletic Stadium	1,803
9	2014.04.29	Blaublitz Akita	1-2	AC Nagano Parceiro	Akita Yabase Playing Field	1,833
10	2014.05.04	AC Nagano Parceiro	1-0	J.League U-22 Selection	Nagano Athletic Stadium	8,011
11	2014.05.11	SC Sagamihara	2-2	AC Nagano Parceiro	Sagamihara Gion Stadium	4,258
12	2014.05.18	AC Nagano Parceiro	3-0	Fukushima United FC	Saku Athletic Stadium	2,508
13	2014.05.25	FC Ryukyu	0-2	AC Nagano Parceiro	Okinawa City Stadium	864
14	2014.06.01	AC Nagano Parceiro	4-0	J.League U-22 Selection	Saku Athletic Stadium	2,325
15	2014.06.08	Fujieda MYFC	0-1	AC Nagano Parceiro	Kusanagi Athletic Stadium	734
16	2014.06.15	AC Nagano Parceiro	3-2	Grulla Morioka	Saku Athletic Stadium	2,308
17	2014.06.22	FC Machida Zelvia	1-0	AC Nagano Parceiro	Machida Stadium	3,513
18	2014.07.20	AC Nagano Parceiro	1-1	Gainare Tottori	Saku Athletic Stadium	2,268
19	2014.07.27	AC Nagano Parceiro	2-0	Blaublitz Akita	Nagano Athletic Stadium	4,329
20	2014.08.02	YSCC Yokohama	1-1	AC Nagano Parceiro	Yokohama Mitsuzawa Athletic Stadium	903
21	2014.08.10	AC Nagano Parceiro	1-2	Zweigen Kanazawa	Nagano Athletic Stadium	3,038
22	2014.08.24	SC Sagamihara	0-1	AC Nagano Parceiro	Sagamihara Gion Stadium	2,354
23	2014.08.31	AC Nagano Parceiro	2-0	FC Machida Zelvia	Nagano Athletic Stadium	6,334
24	2014.09.07	AC Nagano Parceiro	3-0	Blaublitz Akita	Saku Athletic Stadium	2,360
25	2014.09.14	Zweigen Kanazawa	3-2	AC Nagano Parceiro	Ishikawa Athletics Stadium	4,392
26	2014.09.21	FC Ryukyu	0-1	AC Nagano Parceiro	Okinawa City Stadium	1,031
27	2014.10.05	AC Nagano Parceiro	5-0	J.League U-22 Selection	Saku Athletic Stadium	1,705
28	2014.10.12	Gainare Tottori	1-1	AC Nagano Parceiro	Chubu Yajin Stadium	3,470
29	2014.10.19	AC Nagano Parceiro	2-0	SC Sagamihara	Saku Athletic Stadium	4,179
30	2014.11.01	Fujieda MYFC	2-2	AC Nagano Parceiro	Shizuoka Stadium	1,433
31	2014.11.09	Fukushima United FC	0-1	AC Nagano Parceiro	Toho Stadium	1,269
32	2014.11.16	AC Nagano Parceiro	3-0	Grulla Morioka	Nagano Athletic Stadium	5,639
33	2014.11.23	AC Nagano Parceiro	6-1	YSCC Yokohama	Nagano Athletic Stadium	6,619
