= Ri Han-jae =

North Korean footballer (born 1982)

Ri Han-Jae 李 漢宰
Personal information
- Full name: Ri Han-Jae
- Date of birth: 27 June 1982 (age 44)
- Place of birth: Kurashiki, Japan
- Height: 1.73 m (5 ft 8 in)
- Position: Midfielder

Youth career
- 1998–2000: Hiroshima Korean High School

Senior career*
Years	Team	Apps	(Gls)
2001–2009	Sanfrecce Hiroshima	151	(7)
2010	Consadole Sapporo	2	(0)
2011–2013	FC Gifu	53	(1)
2014–2020	FC Machida Zelvia	143	(7)

International career^{‡}
2004–2005	North Korea	7	(1)
- * Club domestic league appearances and goals as of 13 November 2023 ‡ National team caps and goals as of 23 July 2010

- Ri Han-jae
- Hangul: 리한재
- Hanja: 李漢宰
- RR: Ri Hanjae
- MR: Ri Hanjae

Ri Han-Jae (born 27 June 1982) is a former footballer who played for FC Machida Zelvia. Born in Japan, he represented North Korea internationally.

He played for North Korea in 2006 FIFA World Cup qualification.

== Positions ==
Ri Han-Jae's preferred position is defensive midfielder but he can also play right wing, right midfield and occasionally right back. He used to be a central attacking midfielder. Then he transferred to FC Gifu, moving his position to defensive midfielder.

== Career statistics ==
Updated to 23 February 2018.

Club performance			League		Cup		League Cup		Other		Total	
Season	Club	League	Apps	Goals	Apps	Goals	Apps	Goals	Apps	Goals	Apps	Goals
Japan			League		Emperor's Cup		J.League Cup		Other^{1}		Total	
2001	Sanfrecce Hiroshima	J1 League	0	0	0	0	0	0	–		0	0
2002	Sanfrecce Hiroshima	J1 League	1	0	4	0	1	0	–		6	0
2003	Sanfrecce Hiroshima	J2 League	22	1	4	0	-		–		26	1
2004	Sanfrecce Hiroshima	J1 League	26	1	1	0	5	0	–		32	1
2005	Sanfrecce Hiroshima	J1 League	19	1	1	0	0	0	–		20	1
2006	Sanfrecce Hiroshima	J1 League	26	2	2	0	6	0	–		34	2
2007	Sanfrecce Hiroshima	J1 League	6	0	2	0	3	0	2	0	13	0
2008	Sanfrecce Hiroshima	J2 League	37	1	4	0	-		1	0	42	1
2009	Sanfrecce Hiroshima	J1 League	14	1	2	0	3	0	–		19	1
2010	Consadole Sapporo	J2 League	2	0	0	0	-		–		2	0
2011	FC Gifu	J2 League	9	0	0	0	-		–		9	0
2012	FC Gifu	J2 League	32	1	1	0	-		–		33	1
2013	FC Gifu	J2 League	12	0	0	0	-		–		12	0
2014	FC Machida Zelvia	J3 League	27	1	0	0	-		–		27	1
2015	FC Machida Zelvia	J3 League	36	4	0	0	-		2	0	38	4
2016	FC Machida Zelvia	J2 League	41	1	0	0	-		–		41	1
2017	FC Machida Zelvia	J2 League	22	1	0	0	-		–		22	1
Career total			332	15	21	0	18	0	5	0	376	15

^{1}Includes Japanese Super Cup, J1/J2 playoffs and J2/J3 playoffs.

North Korea national team
Year	Apps	Goals
2004	1	1
2005	6	0
Total	7	1

== International goals ==
No.	Date	Venue	Opponent	Score	Result	Competition
1.	13 October 2004	Pyongyang, North Korea	Yemen	1–0	2–1	2006 FIFA World Cup qualification
