= Tatsuya Yazawa =

Japanese footballer

Tatsuya Yazawa 谷澤 達也
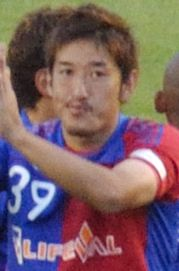

Personal information
- Full name: Tatsuya Yazawa
- Date of birth: October 3, 1984 (age 42)
- Place of birth: Yaizu, Shizuoka, Japan
- Height: 1.74 m (5 ft 8 1/2 in)
- Position: Midfielder

Youth career
- 2000–2002: Shizuoka Gakuen High School

Senior career*
Years	Team	Apps	(Gls)
2003–2007	Kashiwa Reysol	116	(6)
2008–2010	JEF United Chiba	88	(15)
2011–2012	FC Tokyo	57	(6)
2012–2015	JEF United Chiba	124	(13)
2016–2017	FC Machida Zelvia	67	(2)
2018	SC Sagamihara	31	(7)
2019–2021	Fujieda MYFC		

International career
2003	Japan U-20	5	(0)
Medal record
FC Tokyo
Winner	Emperor's Cup	2011
- * Club domestic league appearances and goals as of end of 2018 season

Tatsuya Yazawa (谷澤 達也, Yazawa Tatsuya; born October 3, 1984) is a Japanese football player who plays for Fujieda MYFC.

== Playing career ==
Yazawa was born in Yaizu on October 3, 1984. After graduating from Shizuoka Gakuen High School, he joined J1 League club Kashiwa Reysol in 2003. He played many matches as substitute offensive midfielder from first season. Although Reysol was relegated to J2 League end of 2005 season, he became a regular player from 2006 and Reysol was returned to J1 in a year. In 2008, he moved to Chiba Prefecture's cross town rivals, JEF United Chiba. Although he became a regular player soon, the club results were sluggish and was relegated to J2 end of 2009 season. In 2011, he moved to newly was relegated to J2 League club, FC Tokyo. FC Tokyo won the champions in 2011 season and was returned to J1 in a year. FC Tokyo also won the champions in 2011 Emperor's Cup. In August 2012, he re-joined JEF United Chiba. He became a regular player soon and played many matches every season. In 2016, he moved to newly was promoted to J2 League club, FC Machida Zelvia. He played many matches in 2 seasons. In 2018, he moved to J3 League club SC Sagamihara. In 2019, he moved to J3 club Fujieda MYFC.

== National team career ==
In November 2003, Yazawa was selected Japan U-20 national team for 2003 World Youth Championship. At this tournament, he played all 5 matches.

== Club statistics ==
As of end of 2018 season

Club	Season	League		Emperor's Cup		J.League Cup		AFC		Other^{1}		Total	
Club	Season	Apps	Goals	Apps	Goals	Apps	Goals	Apps	Goals	Apps	Goals	Apps	Goals
Kashiwa Reysol	2003	14	2	1	0	1	0	-		-		16	2
Kashiwa Reysol	2004	26	0	1	0	4	0	-		2	1	33	1
Kashiwa Reysol	2005	21	1	1	0	4	0	-		1	0	27	1
Kashiwa Reysol	2006	32	2	2	1	-		-		-		34	3
Kashiwa Reysol	2007	23	1	1	1	4	0	-		-		28	2
JEF United Chiba	2008	28	7	0	0	7	0	-		-		35	7
JEF United Chiba	2009	32	3	3	0	5	1	-		-		40	4
JEF United Chiba	2010	28	5	2	0	-		-		-		30	5
FC Tokyo	2011	37	5	6	3	-		-		-		43	8
FC Tokyo	2012	20	1	0	0	2	0	7	2	1	0	30	3
JEF United Chiba	2012	14	2	2	1	-		-		2	0	18	3
JEF United Chiba	2013	38	4	2	0	-		-		1	0	41	4
JEF United Chiba	2014	39	6	2	1	-		-		1	0	42	7
JEF United Chiba	2015	33	1	1	0	-		-		-		34	1
FC Machida Zelvia	2016	38	1	0	0	-		-		-		38	1
FC Machida Zelvia	2017	29	1	0	0	-		-		-		29	1
SC Sagamihara	2018	31	7	-		-		-		-		31	7
Fujieda MYFC	2019					-		-		-			
Career total		483	49	24	7	27	1	7	2	8	1	549	60

^{1}Includes Japanese Super Cup, J1/J2 Relegation Playoffs and Promotion Playoffs to J1.
