= 2017 AC Nagano Parceiro season =

AC Nagano Parceiro
2017 season
- Manager: Tetsuya Asano
- Stadium: Minami Nagano Sports Park Stadium
- J3 League: 5th
- Highest home attendance: 8,049
- Lowest home attendance: 2,652
- Average home league attendance: 4,256
| Home colours | Away colours |

2017 AC Nagano Parceiro season.

== J3 League ==
=== League table ===
| Pos | Team | Pld | W | D | L | GF | GA | GD | Pts |
|---|---|---|---|---|---|---|---|---|---|
| 3 | Azul Claro Numazu | 32 | 16 | 11 | 5 | 60 | 27 | +33 | 59 |
| 4 | Kagoshima United | 32 | 17 | 4 | 11 | 49 | 37 | +12 | 55 |
| 5 | Nagano Parceiro | 32 | 13 | 11 | 8 | 34 | 25 | +9 | 50 |
| 6 | FC Ryukyu | 32 | 13 | 11 | 8 | 44 | 36 | +8 | 50 |
| 7 | Fujieda MYFC | 32 | 12 | 11 | 9 | 50 | 43 | +7 | 47 |

Source: 2017 MEIJI YASUDA J3 LEAGUE League table
Rules for classification: 1) Points; 2) Goal difference; 3) Goals scored; 4th) head-to-head results; 5th) disciplinary points; 6th) draw

=== Match details ===
J3 League match details
| Match | Date | Team | Score | Team | Venue | Attendance |
|---|---|---|---|---|---|---|
| 1 | 2017.03.12 | SC Sagamihara | 0-1 | AC Nagano Parceiro | Sagamihara Gion Stadium | 5,562 |
| 2 | 2017.03.19 | AC Nagano Parceiro | 3-0 | YSCC Yokohama | Minami Nagano Sports Park Stadium | 6,009 |
| 3 | 2017.03.26 | Gainare Tottori | 1-0 | AC Nagano Parceiro | Tottori Bank Bird Stadium | 1,574 |
| 4 | 2017.04.02 | AC Nagano Parceiro | 0-1 | Fukushima United FC | Minami Nagano Sports Park Stadium | 4,323 |
| 5 | 2017.04.15 | Gamba Osaka U-23 | 0-2 | AC Nagano Parceiro | Suita City Football Stadium | 1,427 |
| 6 | 2017.04.30 | AC Nagano Parceiro | 0-0 | FC Tokyo U-23 | Minami Nagano Sports Park Stadium | 5,333 |
| 7 | 2017.05.07 | Grulla Morioka | 0-0 | AC Nagano Parceiro | Iwagin Stadium | 1,125 |
| 8 | 2017.05.13 | AC Nagano Parceiro | 2-1 | Kagoshima United FC | Minami Nagano Sports Park Stadium | 2,652 |
| 9 | 2017.05.21 | Blaublitz Akita | 0-0 | AC Nagano Parceiro | Akigin Stadium | 2,379 |
| 10 | 2017.05.28 | AC Nagano Parceiro | 1-0 | Kataller Toyama | Minami Nagano Sports Park Stadium | 4,987 |
| 12 | 2017.06.10 | FC Ryukyu | 1-1 | AC Nagano Parceiro | Okinawa Athletic Park Stadium | 3,222 |
| 13 | 2017.06.18 | AC Nagano Parceiro | 1-1 | Cerezo Osaka U-23 | Minami Nagano Sports Park Stadium | 4,169 |
| 14 | 2017.06.25 | Giravanz Kitakyushu | 1-2 | AC Nagano Parceiro | Mikuni World Stadium Kitakyushu | 4,160 |
| 15 | 2017.07.02 | AC Nagano Parceiro | 0-3 | Fujieda MYFC | Minami Nagano Sports Park Stadium | 3,697 |
| 16 | 2017.07.09 | Azul Claro Numazu | 1-1 | AC Nagano Parceiro | Ashitaka Park Stadium | 2,612 |
| 17 | 2017.07.15 | AC Nagano Parceiro | 0-0 | Tochigi SC | Minami Nagano Sports Park Stadium | 8,049 |
| 18 | 2017.07.23 | AC Nagano Parceiro | 1-0 | FC Ryukyu | Minami Nagano Sports Park Stadium | 3,405 |
| 19 | 2017.08.19 | Kagoshima United FC | 2-1 | AC Nagano Parceiro | Kagoshima Kamoike Stadium | 2,318 |
| 20 | 2017.08.27 | Cerezo Osaka U-23 | 0-0 | AC Nagano Parceiro | Yanmar Stadium Nagai | 727 |
| 21 | 2017.09.03 | AC Nagano Parceiro | 3-0 | Gainare Tottori | Minami Nagano Sports Park Stadium | 3,484 |
| 22 | 2017.09.10 | AC Nagano Parceiro | 1-0 | SC Sagamihara | Minami Nagano Sports Park Stadium | 3,669 |
| 23 | 2017.09.17 | FC Tokyo U-23 | 1-0 | AC Nagano Parceiro | Yumenoshima Stadium | 1,227 |
| 24 | 2017.09.24 | AC Nagano Parceiro | 3-0 | Gamba Osaka U-23 | Minami Nagano Sports Park Stadium | 3,530 |
| 25 | 2017.10.01 | Fukushima United FC | 2-0 | AC Nagano Parceiro | Toho Stadium | 1,427 |
| 26 | 2017.10.08 | AC Nagano Parceiro | 1-1 | Grulla Morioka | Minami Nagano Sports Park Stadium | 3,356 |
| 27 | 2017.10.14 | YSCC Yokohama | 1-3 | AC Nagano Parceiro | NHK Spring Mitsuzawa Football Stadium | 706 |
| 29 | 2017.10.29 | AC Nagano Parceiro | 1-2 | Blaublitz Akita | Minami Nagano Sports Park Stadium | 2,986 |
| 30 | 2017.11.05 | Fujieda MYFC | 4-2 | AC Nagano Parceiro | Fujieda Soccer Stadium | 1,503 |
| 31 | 2017.11.12 | AC Nagano Parceiro | 1-0 | Azul Claro Numazu | Minami Nagano Sports Park Stadium | 3,605 |
| 32 | 2017.11.19 | Kataller Toyama | 1-2 | AC Nagano Parceiro | Toyama Stadium | 1,929 |
| 33 | 2017.11.26 | Tochigi SC | 0-0 | AC Nagano Parceiro | Tochigi Green Stadium | 8,245 |
| 34 | 2017.12.03 | AC Nagano Parceiro | 1-1 | Giravanz Kitakyushu | Minami Nagano Sports Park Stadium | 4,841 |
