= 2015 AC Nagano Parceiro season =

AC Nagano Parceiro
2015 season
- Manager: Naohiko Minobe; Hajime Eto
- Stadium: Minami Nagano Sports Park Stadium
- J3 League: 3rd
Home colours	Away colours

2015 AC Nagano Parceiro season.

== League Table ==
Pos	Team	Pld	W	D	L	GF	GA	GD	Pts	Promotion or relegation
1	Renofa Yamaguchi (C, P)	36	25	3	8	96	36	+60	78	Promotion to 2016 J2 League
2	Machida Zelvia (P)	36	23	9	4	52	18	+34	78	Qualification to J2 League promotion playoffs (Note: Only teams that hold a J2 license are eligible for promotion.)
3	Nagano Parceiro	36	21	7	8	46	28	+18	70	
4	SC Sagamihara	36	17	7	12	59	51	+8	58	
5	Kataller Toyama	36	14	10	12	37	36	+1	52	

Updated to match(es) played on 23 November 2015. Source: JLeague.jp
Rules for classification: 1) Points; 2) Goal difference; 3) Goals scored; 4th) head-to-head results; 5th) disciplinary points; 6th) draw
(C) Champions; (P) Promoted

== J3 League ==
Match	Date	Team	Score	Team	Venue	Attendance
1	2015.03.15	FC Machida Zelvia	0-0	AC Nagano Parceiro	Machida Stadium	7,803
2	2015.03.22	AC Nagano Parceiro	1-2	SC Sagamihara	Minami Nagano Sports Park Stadium	8,681
3	2015.03.29	Fujieda MYFC	0-1	AC Nagano Parceiro	Fujieda Soccer Stadium	1,039
4	2015.04.05	AC Nagano Parceiro	2-1	FC Ryukyu	Minami Nagano Sports Park Stadium	3,849
5	2015.04.12	YSCC Yokohama	0-2	AC Nagano Parceiro	NHK Spring Mitsuzawa Football Stadium	1,117
7	2015.04.26	AC Nagano Parceiro	2-1	Renofa Yamaguchi FC	Minami Nagano Sports Park Stadium	5,062
8	2015.04.29	Fukushima United FC	1-2	AC Nagano Parceiro	Toho Stadium	1,517
9	2015.05.03	AC Nagano Parceiro	0-1	Kataller Toyama	Minami Nagano Sports Park Stadium	6,372
10	2015.05.06	AC Nagano Parceiro	2-0	J.League U-22 Selection	Minami Nagano Sports Park Stadium	3,932
11	2015.05.10	Grulla Morioka	0-2	AC Nagano Parceiro	Morioka Minami Park Stadium	1,329
12	2015.05.17	AC Nagano Parceiro	1-0	Blaublitz Akita	Minami Nagano Sports Park Stadium	3,769
13	2015.05.24	Gainare Tottori	0-1	AC Nagano Parceiro	Tottori Bank Bird Stadium	1,530
14	2015.05.31	AC Nagano Parceiro	1-0	Kataller Toyama	Minami Nagano Sports Park Stadium	4,508
15	2015.06.07	FC Machida Zelvia	2-0	AC Nagano Parceiro	Machida Stadium	3,568
16	2015.06.14	AC Nagano Parceiro	2-0	Gainare Tottori	Minami Nagano Sports Park Stadium	4,157
17	2015.06.21	AC Nagano Parceiro	0-1	Grulla Morioka	Minami Nagano Sports Park Stadium	4,882
18	2015.06.28	Blaublitz Akita	1-2	AC Nagano Parceiro	Akita Yabase Athletic Field	1,751
20	2015.07.12	Renofa Yamaguchi FC	3-2	AC Nagano Parceiro	Ishin Memorial Park Stadium	4,225
21	2015.07.19	AC Nagano Parceiro	1-0	YSCC Yokohama	Minami Nagano Sports Park Stadium	5,106
22	2015.07.26	FC Ryukyu	1-1	AC Nagano Parceiro	Okinawa Athletic Park Stadium	723
23	2015.07.29	AC Nagano Parceiro	0-0	SC Sagamihara	Minami Nagano Sports Park Stadium	3,159
24	2015.08.02	Fujieda MYFC	2-1	AC Nagano Parceiro	Fujieda Soccer Stadium	1,417
25	2015.08.09	AC Nagano Parceiro	1-0	Fukushima United FC	Minami Nagano Sports Park Stadium	4,780
26	2015.08.16	AC Nagano Parceiro	0-1	J.League U-22 Selection	Minami Nagano Sports Park Stadium	4,654
27	2015.09.06	Kataller Toyama	0-0	AC Nagano Parceiro	Toyama Stadium	2,973
28	2015.09.13	Fukushima United FC	0-1	AC Nagano Parceiro	Toho Stadium	920
29	2015.09.20	AC Nagano Parceiro	2-1	Fujieda MYFC	Minami Nagano Sports Park Stadium	4,257
31	2015.09.27	AC Nagano Parceiro	2-2	Grulla Morioka	Minami Nagano Sports Park Stadium	3,628
32	2015.10.04	AC Nagano Parceiro	1-0	Gainare Tottori	Minami Nagano Sports Park Stadium	3,616
33	2015.10.11	Blaublitz Akita	1-1	AC Nagano Parceiro	Akigin Stadium	1,916
34	2015.10.18	AC Nagano Parceiro	2-1	FC Ryukyu	Minami Nagano Sports Park Stadium	4,411
35	2015.10.25	Renofa Yamaguchi FC	1-2	AC Nagano Parceiro	Ishin Memorial Park Stadium	5,644
36	2015.11.01	AC Nagano Parceiro	2-1	J.League U-22 Selection	Minami Nagano Sports Park Stadium	4,163
37	2015.11.08	AC Nagano Parceiro	5-1	YSCC Yokohama	Minami Nagano Sports Park Stadium	4,362
38	2015.11.15	SC Sagamihara	2-0	AC Nagano Parceiro	Sagamihara Gion Stadium	3,854
39	2015.11.23	AC Nagano Parceiro	1-1	FC Machida Zelvia	Minami Nagano Sports Park Stadium	7,317
