= Yuji Unozawa =

Japanese footballer

Yuji Unozawa 宇野沢 祐次
Personal information
- Full name: Yuji Unozawa
- Date of birth: 3 May 1983 (age 43)
- Place of birth: Matsudo, Chiba, Japan
- Height: 1.76 m (5 ft 9 1/2 in)
- Position: Forward

Youth career
- 1999–2001: Kashiwa Reysol

Senior career*
Years	Team	Apps	(Gls)
2002–2006	Kashiwa Reysol	68	(4)
2007	Avispa Fukuoka	10	(0)
2008–2009	Japan Soccer College	22	(14)
2010–2019	Nagano Parceiro	213	(81)
Total		313	(99)
- * Club domestic league appearances and goals as of 2 April 2020

Yuji Unozawa (宇野沢 祐次, Unozawa Yuji; born 3 May 1983) is a former Japanese football player who last played for Nagano Parceiro.

== Club career ==
Unozawa was born in Matsudo on 3 May 1983. He joined J1 League club Kashiwa Reysol from youth team in 2002. He played many matches as forward from first season. However he could not score many goals and Reysol was relegated to J2 League end of 2005 season. Reysol won the 2nd place in 2006 season and was returned to J1 in a year. However he left Reysol end of 2006 season without playing J1 and moved to J2 club Avispa Fukuoka in 2007. However he could not play many matches in Avispa. In 2008, he moved to Regional Leagues club Japan Soccer College. He played many matches and scored many goals in 2 seasons.

In 2010, he moved to Regional Leagues club Nagano Parceiro. Parceiro was promoted to Japan Football League from 2011. He scored many goals every season and became a top scorer in 2013 season. Parceiro also won the champions in 2013 season and was promoted to new league J3 League. He has been a key-symbol for the club, opting to retire at the end of the 2019 season, after playing just four games in that year.

== National team career ==
In November 2003, Unozawa was selected Japan U-20 national team for 2003 World Youth Championship. But he did not play in the match.

== Career statistics ==
As of 2 April 2020.

Appearances and goals by club, season and competition
Club	Season	League			Emperor's Cup		J.League Cup		Total	
Club	Season	Division	Apps	Goals	Apps	Goals	Apps	Goals	Apps	Goals
Kashiwa Reysol	2002	J1 League	13	3	1	0	3	0	17	3
Kashiwa Reysol	2003	J1 League	15	0	1	0	2	1	18	1
Kashiwa Reysol	2004	J1 League	11	1	1	0	4	2	16	3
Kashiwa Reysol	2005	J1 League	13	0	2	1	4	1	19	2
Kashiwa Reysol	2006	J2 League	16	0	5	1	-		21	1
Avispa Fukuoka	2007	J2 League	10	0	0	0	-		10	0
Japan Soccer College	2008	JRL (Hokushinetsu)	11	8	-		-		11	8
Japan Soccer College	2009	JRL (Hokushinetsu)	11	6	2	2	-		13	8
Nagano Parceiro	2010	JRL (Hokushinetsu)	14	7	-		-		14	7
Nagano Parceiro	2011	JFL	33	15	-		-		33	15
Nagano Parceiro	2012	JFL	32	17	2	0	-		34	17
Nagano Parceiro	2013	JFL	34	20	4	1	-		38	21
Nagano Parceiro	2014	J3 League	33	16	2	0	-		35	16
Nagano Parceiro	2015	J3 League	25	1	1	0	-		26	1
Nagano Parceiro	2016	J3 League	6	0	2	0	-		8	0
Nagano Parceiro	2017	J3 League	13	4	1	0	-		14	4
Nagano Parceiro	2018	J3 League	19	1	0	0	-		19	1
Nagano Parceiro	2019	J3 League	4	0	1	0	-		5	0
Career total			313	99	25	5	13	4	351	108
