= 2015 FC Machida Zelvia season =

FC Machida Zelvia
2015 season
- Manager: Naoki Soma
- Stadium: Machida Stadium
- J3 League: 2nd
Home colours	Away colours

2015 FC Machida Zelvia season.

== J3 League ==
=== League table ===
Pos	Team	Pld	W	D	L	GF	GA	GD	Pts	Promotion or relegation
1	Renofa Yamaguchi (C, P)	36	25	3	8	96	36	+60	78	Promotion to 2016 J2 League
2	Machida Zelvia (P)	36	23	9	4	52	18	+34	78	Qualification to J2 League promotion playoffs (Note: Only teams that hold a J2 license are eligible for promotion.)
3	Nagano Parceiro	36	21	7	8	46	28	+18	70	
4	SC Sagamihara	36	17	7	12	59	51	+8	58	
5	Kataller Toyama	36	14	10	12	37	36	+1	52	
6	Gainare Tottori	36	14	8	14	47	41	+6	50	

Updated to match(es) played on 23 November 2015. Source: JLeague.jp
Rules for classification: 1) Points; 2) Goal difference; 3) Goals scored; 4th) head-to-head results; 5th) disciplinary points; 6th) draw
(C) Champions; (P) Promoted

=== Match details ===
J3 League match details
Match	Date	Team	Score	Team	Venue	Attendance
1	2015.03.15	FC Machida Zelvia	0-0	AC Nagano Parceiro	Machida Stadium	7,803
2	2015.03.21	YSCC Yokohama	0-1	FC Machida Zelvia	NHK Spring Mitsuzawa Football Stadium	1,723
3	2015.03.29	FC Machida Zelvia	0-1	Blaublitz Akita	Machida Stadium	2,853
4	2015.04.05	Kataller Toyama	1-2	FC Machida Zelvia	Toyama Stadium	2,552
5	2015.04.12	FC Machida Zelvia	2-0	Gainare Tottori	Machida Stadium	2,843
6	2015.04.19	SC Sagamihara	2-1	FC Machida Zelvia	Sagamihara Gion Stadium	4,862
7	2015.04.26	FC Machida Zelvia	6-0	J.League U-22 Selection	Machida Stadium	3,511
8	2015.04.29	Grulla Morioka	0-0	FC Machida Zelvia	Morioka Minami Park Stadium	1,277
9	2015.05.03	FC Machida Zelvia	1-0	FC Ryukyu	Machida Stadium	3,121
10	2015.05.06	FC Machida Zelvia	1-1	Fukushima United FC	Machida Stadium	2,802
12	2015.05.17	Fujieda MYFC	1-1	FC Machida Zelvia	Fujieda Soccer Stadium	1,516
13	2015.05.24	FC Machida Zelvia	1-0	Renofa Yamaguchi FC	Machida Stadium	3,132
14	2015.05.31	Blaublitz Akita	0-1	FC Machida Zelvia	Akigin Stadium	1,237
15	2015.06.07	FC Machida Zelvia	2-0	AC Nagano Parceiro	Machida Stadium	3,568
16	2015.06.14	Renofa Yamaguchi FC	1-2	FC Machida Zelvia	Shimonoseki Stadium	2,639
17	2015.06.21	Fukushima United FC	1-1	FC Machida Zelvia	Shonan BMW Stadium Hiratsuka	1,507
18	2015.06.28	FC Machida Zelvia	2-1	YSCC Yokohama	Machida Stadium	2,536
19	2015.07.05	Gainare Tottori	0-0	FC Machida Zelvia	Chubu Yajin Stadium	2,446
20	2015.07.12	FC Machida Zelvia	2-0	FC Ryukyu	Machida Stadium	2,543
21	2015.07.19	FC Machida Zelvia	3-1	J.League U-22 Selection	Machida Stadium	2,848
23	2015.07.29	FC Machida Zelvia	0-1	Grulla Morioka	Machida Stadium	2,005
24	2015.08.02	FC Machida Zelvia	1-0	Kataller Toyama	Machida Stadium	3,012
25	2015.08.09	SC Sagamihara	0-1	FC Machida Zelvia	Sagamihara Gion Stadium	5,549
26	2015.08.16	FC Machida Zelvia	4-0	Fujieda MYFC	Machida Stadium	2,427
27	2015.09.05	YSCC Yokohama	0-2	FC Machida Zelvia	NHK Spring Mitsuzawa Football Stadium	1,631
28	2015.09.13	Grulla Morioka	1-1	FC Machida Zelvia	Morioka Minami Park Stadium	811
29	2015.09.20	FC Machida Zelvia	1-3	Renofa Yamaguchi FC	Machida Stadium	5,191
30	2015.09.23	FC Machida Zelvia	1-0	J.League U-22 Selection	Machida Stadium	5,873
31	2015.09.27	Fujieda MYFC	1-2	FC Machida Zelvia	Shizuoka Stadium	1,406
33	2015.10.11	FC Machida Zelvia	2-0	Kataller Toyama	Machida Stadium	3,163
34	2015.10.18	FC Machida Zelvia	1-0	SC Sagamihara	Machida Stadium	7,782
35	2015.10.25	FC Ryukyu	0-2	FC Machida Zelvia	Okinawa Athletic Park Stadium	823
36	2015.11.01	FC Machida Zelvia	1-0	Fukushima United FC	Machida Stadium	3,812
37	2015.11.08	Gainare Tottori	1-1	FC Machida Zelvia	Tottori Bank Bird Stadium	1,258
38	2015.11.15	FC Machida Zelvia	2-0	Blaublitz Akita	Machida Stadium	4,487
39	2015.11.23	AC Nagano Parceiro	1-1	FC Machida Zelvia	Minami Nagano Sports Park Stadium	7,317
