= 2018 AC Nagano Parceiro season =

AC Nagano Parceiro
2018 season
- Manager: Tetsuya Asano; Yuji Sakakura
- Stadium: Nagano U Stadium
- J3 League: 10th
| Home colours | Away colours |

2018 AC Nagano Parceiro season.

== Competitions ==
=== Emperor's Cup ===
Beat Niigata University of Health and Welfare in the first round.
Lost to Omiya Ardija in the 2nd round.

=== League table ===
| Pos | Team | Pld | W | D | L | GF | GA | GD | Pts |
|---|---|---|---|---|---|---|---|---|---|
| 8 | Blaublitz Akita | 32 | 12 | 7 | 13 | 37 | 35 | +2 | 43 |
| 9 | SC Sagamihara | 32 | 12 | 6 | 14 | 42 | 53 | −11 | 42 |
| 10 | Nagano Parceiro | 32 | 10 | 11 | 11 | 39 | 37 | +2 | 41 |
| 11 | Kataller Toyama | 32 | 12 | 5 | 15 | 41 | 50 | −9 | 41 |
| 12 | Fukushima United | 32 | 9 | 13 | 10 | 36 | 43 | −7 | 40 |

Source: 2018 MEIJI YASUDA J3 LEAGUE League table
Rules for classification: 1) Points; 2) Goal difference; 3) Goals scored; 4th) head-to-head results; 5th) disciplinary points; 6th) draw

== J3 League ==
| Match | Date | Team | Score | Team | Venue | Attendance |
|---|---|---|---|---|---|---|
| 1 | 2018.03.10 | Fujieda MYFC | 1-0 | AC Nagano Parceiro | Fujieda Soccer Stadium | 1,837 |
| 2 | 2018.03.17 | SC Sagamihara | 2-2 | AC Nagano Parceiro | Sagamihara Gion Stadium | 3,569 |
| 3 | 2018.03.21 | AC Nagano Parceiro | 1-0 | FC Tokyo U-23 | Nagano U Stadium | 3,839 |
| 5 | 2018.04.01 | AC Nagano Parceiro | 1-1 | Giravanz Kitakyushu | Nagano U Stadium | 3,506 |
| 6 | 2018.04.08 | AC Nagano Parceiro | 2-2 | Azul Claro Numazu | Nagano U Stadium | 3,003 |
| 7 | 2018.04.15 | Gamba Osaka U-23 | 1-1 | AC Nagano Parceiro | Panasonic Stadium Suita | 1,575 |
| 8 | 2018.04.28 | AC Nagano Parceiro | 1-2 | Cerezo Osaka U-23 | Nagano U Stadium | 3,198 |
| 9 | 2018.05.03 | Kagoshima United FC | 2-2 | AC Nagano Parceiro | Shiranami Stadium | 4,094 |
| 10 | 2018.05.06 | AC Nagano Parceiro | 2-2 | Thespakusatsu Gunma | Nagano U Stadium | 4,667 |
| 11 | 2018.05.20 | Blaublitz Akita | 1-2 | AC Nagano Parceiro | Akigin Stadium | 2,791 |
| 12 | 2018.06.02 | FC Ryukyu | 2-0 | AC Nagano Parceiro | Okinawa Athletic Park Stadium | 2,473 |
| 13 | 2018.06.10 | AC Nagano Parceiro | 0-1 | Gainare Tottori | Nagano U Stadium | 3,457 |
| 14 | 2018.06.16 | Grulla Morioka | 3-0 | AC Nagano Parceiro | Iwagin Stadium | 1,239 |
| 15 | 2018.06.23 | YSCC Yokohama | 0-1 | AC Nagano Parceiro | NHK Spring Mitsuzawa Football Stadium | 887 |
| 16 | 2018.07.01 | AC Nagano Parceiro | 1-1 | Fukushima United FC | Nagano U Stadium | 3,576 |
| 17 | 2018.07.08 | AC Nagano Parceiro | 5-0 | Kataller Toyama | Nagano U Stadium | 3,130 |
| 18 | 2018.07.15 | Thespakusatsu Gunma | 0-1 | AC Nagano Parceiro | Shoda Shoyu Stadium Gunma | 4,301 |
| 19 | 2018.07.22 | AC Nagano Parceiro | 1-2 | Blaublitz Akita | Nagano U Stadium | 7,082 |
| 20 | 2018.08.25 | Giravanz Kitakyushu | 1-0 | AC Nagano Parceiro | Mikuni World Stadium Kitakyushu | 12,812 |
| 22 | 2018.09.09 | AC Nagano Parceiro | 4-0 | Fujieda MYFC | Nagano U Stadium | 2,797 |
| 23 | 2018.09.16 | Fukushima United FC | 1-1 | AC Nagano Parceiro | Toho Stadium | 3,199 |
| 24 | 2018.09.23 | AC Nagano Parceiro | 2-1 | SC Sagamihara | Nagano U Stadium | 3,006 |
| 25 | 2018.09.29 | Cerezo Osaka U-23 | 2-0 | AC Nagano Parceiro | Yanmar Stadium Nagai | 509 |
| 26 | 2018.10.07 | AC Nagano Parceiro | 1-1 | Kagoshima United FC | Nagano U Stadium | 2,683 |
| 27 | 2018.10.14 | AC Nagano Parceiro | 0-1 | YSCC Yokohama | Nagano U Stadium | 2,679 |
| 28 | 2018.10.21 | Kataller Toyama | 1-1 | AC Nagano Parceiro | Toyama Stadium | 3,016 |
| 29 | 2018.10.28 | AC Nagano Parceiro | 1-1 | FC Ryukyu | Nagano U Stadium | 2,993 |
| 30 | 2018.11.04 | Azul Claro Numazu | 2-3 | AC Nagano Parceiro | Ashitaka Park Stadium | 2,170 |
| 31 | 2018.11.11 | AC Nagano Parceiro | 2-1 | Gamba Osaka U-23 | Nagano U Stadium | 2,828 |
| 32 | 2018.11.18 | Gainare Tottori | 1-0 | AC Nagano Parceiro | Tottori Bank Bird Stadium | 1,906 |
| 33 | 2018.11.23 | FC Tokyo U-23 | 0-1 | AC Nagano Parceiro | Ajinomoto Field Nishigaoka | 2,438 |
| 34 | 2018.12.02 | AC Nagano Parceiro | 0-1 | Grulla Morioka | Nagano U Stadium | 4,425 |
