= 2016 AC Nagano Parceiro season =

AC Nagano Parceiro
2016 season
- Manager: Fumitake Miura
- Stadium: Minami Nagano Sports Park Stadium
- J3 League: 3rd
Home colours	Away colours

2016 AC Nagano Parceiro season.

== League table ==
Pos	Team	Pld	W	D	L	GF	GA	GD	Pts	Qualification or relegation
1	Oita Trinita (C, P)	30	19	4	7	50	24	+26	61	Promotion to 2017 J2 League
2	Tochigi SC	30	17	8	5	38	20	+18	59	Qualification to J2 promotion playoffs (Note: Only teams that hold a J2 license are eligible for promotion.)
3	Nagano Parceiro	30	15	7	8	33	22	+11	52	
4	Blaublitz Akita	30	14	8	8	37	26	+11	50	
5	Kagoshima United	30	15	5	10	39	29	+10	50	

Updated to match(es) played on 20 November 2016. Source: 2016 MEIJI YASUDA J3 LEAGUE League table
Rules for classification: 1) Points; 2) Goal difference; 3) Goals scored; 4th) head-to-head results; 5th) disciplinary points; 6th) draw
(C) Champions; (P) Promoted

== J3 League ==
Match	Date	Team	Score	Team	Venue	Attendance
1	2016.03.13	Oita Trinita	1-0	AC Nagano Parceiro	Oita Bank Dome	9,189
2	2016.03.20	AC Nagano Parceiro	1-0	Tochigi SC	Minami Nagano Sports Park Stadium	7,073
3	2016.04.03	Grulla Morioka	0-1	AC Nagano Parceiro	Iwagin Stadium	1,434
4	2016.04.10	AC Nagano Parceiro	2-1	Fujieda MYFC	Minami Nagano Sports Park Stadium	3,906
5	2016.04.16	Cerezo Osaka U-23	0-0	AC Nagano Parceiro	Yanmar Stadium Nagai	1,594
6	2016.04.24	YSCC Yokohama	0-2	AC Nagano Parceiro	NHK Spring Mitsuzawa Football Stadium	931
7	2016.05.01	AC Nagano Parceiro	0-0	Gainare Tottori	Minami Nagano Sports Park Stadium	5,440
8	2016.05.08	Kataller Toyama	2-0	AC Nagano Parceiro	Toyama Stadium	4,810
9	2016.05.15	AC Nagano Parceiro	2-1	Fukushima United FC	Minami Nagano Sports Park Stadium	3,794
10	2016.05.22	Blaublitz Akita	1-1	AC Nagano Parceiro	Akigin Stadium	2,229
11	2016.05.29	AC Nagano Parceiro	0-1	FC Tokyo U-23	Minami Nagano Sports Park Stadium	4,449
12	2016.06.12	AC Nagano Parceiro	2-0	FC Ryukyu	Minami Nagano Sports Park Stadium	3,986
13	2016.06.18	Kagoshima United FC	0-0	AC Nagano Parceiro	Kagoshima Kamoike Stadium	4,706
14	2016.06.26	AC Nagano Parceiro	2-1	SC Sagamihara	Minami Nagano Sports Park Stadium	4,468
15	2016.07.03	Gamba Osaka U-23	1-1	AC Nagano Parceiro	Suita City Football Stadium	1,862
16	2016.07.10	AC Nagano Parceiro	1-0	Blaublitz Akita	Minami Nagano Sports Park Stadium	4,810
17	2016.07.16	AC Nagano Parceiro	3-0	YSCC Yokohama	Minami Nagano Sports Park Stadium	4,020
18	2016.07.24	Gainare Tottori	2-0	AC Nagano Parceiro	Tottori Bank Bird Stadium	1,616
19	2016.07.31	AC Nagano Parceiro	0-0	Kataller Toyama	Minami Nagano Sports Park Stadium	10,377
20	2016.08.07	Fujieda MYFC	3-2	AC Nagano Parceiro	Fujieda Soccer Stadium	1,817
21	2016.09.11	AC Nagano Parceiro	4-0	Gamba Osaka U-23	Minami Nagano Sports Park Stadium	4,863
22	2016.09.18	Fukushima United FC	1-0	AC Nagano Parceiro	Shonan BMW Stadium Hiratsuka	1,423
23	2016.09.25	AC Nagano Parceiro	1-3	Cerezo Osaka U-23	Minami Nagano Sports Park Stadium	3,936
24	2016.10.02	SC Sagamihara	1-2	AC Nagano Parceiro	Sagamihara Gion Stadium	3,448
25	2016.10.16	AC Nagano Parceiro	1-0	Oita Trinita	Minami Nagano Sports Park Stadium	5,137
26	2016.10.23	FC Ryukyu	2-1	AC Nagano Parceiro	Okinawa Athletic Park Stadium	1,354
27	2016.10.30	AC Nagano Parceiro	0-0	Grulla Morioka	Minami Nagano Sports Park Stadium	3,905
28	2016.11.05	FC Tokyo U-23	1-2	AC Nagano Parceiro	Komazawa Olympic Park Stadium	7,653
29	2016.11.13	Tochigi SC	0-1	AC Nagano Parceiro	Tochigi Green Stadium	7,690
30	2016.11.20	AC Nagano Parceiro	1-0	Kagoshima United FC	Minami Nagano Sports Park Stadium	5,110
