= 2014 FC Machida Zelvia season =

FC Machida Zelvia
2014 season
- Manager: Naoki Soma
- Stadium: Machida Stadium
- J3 League: 3rd
Home colours	Away colours

FC Machida Zelvia (フットボールクラブ町田ゼルビア, Futtobōru Kurabu Machida Zerubia) was one of the twelve teams chosen (the 'original-11', plus the J-League under 22 selection squad) to participate in the 2014 inaugural season of the professional J3 LeagueJapanese football competition. The team was already licensed for the J2 league, having already played in that league for the 2013 season before being relegated. This meant they were one of only four teams in the league licensed for the J2 League, and therefore eligible to promotion to J2 at the end of the season.

== 2013 relegation ==
Having finished in last place in the J2 League in 2013, Machida faced relegation out of the J-League altogether, dropping to the semi-professional JFL league. In part to "rescue" Machida from this ignominious fate, support for the establishment of a new J3 League developed.

== J3 League ==
Match	Date	Team	Score	Team	Venue	Attendance
1	2014.03.09	FC Machida Zelvia	3-0	Fujieda MYFC	Machida Stadium	4,569
2	2014.03.16	FC Machida Zelvia	0-0	AC Nagano Parceiro	Machida Stadium	3,416
3	2014.03.23	YSCC Yokohama	1-1	FC Machida Zelvia	NHK Spring Mitsuzawa Football Stadium	1,819
4	2014.03.30	FC Machida Zelvia	2-0	SC Sagamihara	Machida Stadium	2,163
5	2014.04.06	Grulla Morioka	1-4	FC Machida Zelvia	Morioka Minami Park Stadium	1,405
6	2014.04.13	FC Machida Zelvia	0-0	Zweigen Kanazawa	Machida Stadium	2,968
7	2014.04.20	FC Ryukyu	1-7	FC Machida Zelvia	Okinawa City Stadium	856
8	2014.04.26	FC Machida Zelvia	4-0	J.League U-22 Selection	Machida Stadium	2,497
9	2014.04.29	Gainare Tottori	0-1	FC Machida Zelvia	Chubu Yajin Stadium	3,486
10	2014.05.04	FC Machida Zelvia	4-1	Blaublitz Akita	Machida Stadium	3,554
11	2014.05.11	Fukushima United FC	1-0	FC Machida Zelvia	Toho Stadium	1,197
12	2014.05.18	FC Machida Zelvia	1-1	Grulla Morioka	Machida Stadium	3,049
13	2014.05.24	Zweigen Kanazawa	0-1	FC Machida Zelvia	Ishikawa Athletics Stadium	2,516
14	2014.06.01	YSCC Yokohama	0-1	FC Machida Zelvia	NHK Spring Mitsuzawa Football Stadium	1,741
15	2014.06.08	FC Machida Zelvia	2-1	SC Sagamihara	Machida Stadium	3,519
16	2014.06.15	Fukushima United FC	0-2	FC Machida Zelvia	Toho Stadium	1,485
17	2014.06.22	FC Machida Zelvia	1-0	AC Nagano Parceiro	Machida Stadium	3,513
18	2014.07.19	Blaublitz Akita	1-4	FC Machida Zelvia	Akita Yabase Playing Field	2,130
19	2014.07.27	FC Machida Zelvia	1-1	J.League U-22 Selection	Machida Stadium	2,593
20	2014.08.03	Fujieda MYFC	1-2	FC Machida Zelvia	Fujieda Soccer Stadium	1,523
21	2014.08.10	FC Machida Zelvia	1-1	Gainare Tottori	Machida Stadium	2,231
22	2014.08.24	FC Machida Zelvia	0-1	FC Ryukyu	Machida Stadium	2,553
23	2014.08.31	AC Nagano Parceiro	2-0	FC Machida Zelvia	Nagano Athletic Stadium	6,334
24	2014.09.07	FC Machida Zelvia	3-0	J.League U-22 Selection	Machida Stadium	3,015
25	2014.09.14	Blaublitz Akita	2-1	FC Machida Zelvia	Akigin Stadium	2,191
26	2014.09.21	SC Sagamihara	1-2	FC Machida Zelvia	Sagamihara Gion Stadium	5,630
27	2014.10.05	FC Machida Zelvia	1-2	Gainare Tottori	Machida Stadium	2,012
28	2014.10.12	FC Machida Zelvia	0-0	Zweigen Kanazawa	Machida Stadium	4,312
29	2014.10.19	Grulla Morioka	1-1	FC Machida Zelvia	Morioka Minami Park Stadium	1,568
30	2014.11.02	FC Machida Zelvia	2-1	YSCC Yokohama	Machida Stadium	3,018
31	2014.11.09	FC Machida Zelvia	4-1	FC Ryukyu	Machida Stadium	2,950
32	2014.11.16	FC Machida Zelvia	2-0	Fukushima United FC	Machida Stadium	4,472
33	2014.11.23	Fujieda MYFC	0-1	FC Machida Zelvia	Fujieda Soccer Stadium	2,615
