= 2018 SC Sagamihara season =

SC Sagamihara
2018 season
- Manager: Takayuki Nishigaya
- Stadium: Sagamihara Gion Stadium
- J3 League: 9th

2018 SC Sagamihara season.

== J3 League ==
Match	Date	Team	Score	Team	Venue	Attendance
1	2018.03.09	YSCC Yokohama	2-2	SC Sagamihara	NHK Spring Mitsuzawa Football Stadium	1,141
2	2018.03.17	SC Sagamihara	2-2	AC Nagano Parceiro	Sagamihara Gion Stadium	3,569
4	2018.03.25	Cerezo Osaka U-23	2-1	SC Sagamihara	Kincho Stadium	1,009
5	2018.04.01	SC Sagamihara	2-4	Gainare Tottori	Sagamihara Gion Stadium	2,776
6	2018.04.08	Giravanz Kitakyushu	0-4	SC Sagamihara	Mikuni World Stadium Kitakyushu	3,453
7	2018.04.15	SC Sagamihara	1-0	Kataller Toyama	Sagamihara Gion Stadium	3,573
9	2018.05.03	Thespakusatsu Gunma	1-1	SC Sagamihara	Shoda Shoyu Stadium Gunma	3,300
10	2018.05.06	SC Sagamihara	1-0	Grulla Morioka	Sagamihara Gion Stadium	4,015
11	2018.05.19	Kagoshima United FC	2-1	SC Sagamihara	Shiranami Stadium	2,604
12	2018.06.02	Fujieda MYFC	2-1	SC Sagamihara	Fujieda Soccer Stadium	1,356
13	2018.06.10	SC Sagamihara	2-5	FC Ryukyu	Sagamihara Gion Stadium	1,917
14	2018.06.17	Fukushima United FC	2-2	SC Sagamihara	Toho Stadium	1,223
15	2018.06.23	SC Sagamihara	1-0	FC Tokyo U-23	Sagamihara Gion Stadium	2,531
16	2018.06.30	SC Sagamihara	2-3	Gamba Osaka U-23	Sagamihara Gion Stadium	3,256
17	2018.07.08	Blaublitz Akita	1-2	SC Sagamihara	Akigin Stadium	2,391
18	2018.07.15	Grulla Morioka	0-3	SC Sagamihara	Iwagin Stadium	1,304
19	2018.07.21	SC Sagamihara	1-1	Fukushima United FC	Sagamihara Gion Stadium	2,229
21	2018.09.02	Gainare Tottori	7-0	SC Sagamihara	Chubu Yajin Stadium	3,073
22	2018.09.08	SC Sagamihara	0-1	Blaublitz Akita	Sagamihara Gion Stadium	4,612
3	2018.09.12	SC Sagamihara	2-1	Azul Claro Numazu	Sagamihara Gion Stadium	1,602
23	2018.09.16	FC Tokyo U-23	3-0	SC Sagamihara	Yumenoshima Stadium	934
24	2018.09.23	AC Nagano Parceiro	2-1	SC Sagamihara	Nagano U Stadium	3,006
25	2018.09.30	SC Sagamihara	0-1	Thespakusatsu Gunma	Sagamihara Gion Stadium	1,998
26	2018.10.07	Kataller Toyama	3-2	SC Sagamihara	Toyama Stadium	2,232
27	2018.10.13	SC Sagamihara	1-0	Giravanz Kitakyushu	Sagamihara Gion Stadium	3,012
28	2018.10.21	SC Sagamihara	2-1	Cerezo Osaka U-23	Sagamihara Gion Stadium	1,955
29	2018.10.28	Gamba Osaka U-23	2-1	SC Sagamihara	Panasonic Stadium Suita	1,310
30	2018.11.04	SC Sagamihara	1-0	YSCC Yokohama	Sagamihara Gion Stadium	2,542
31	2018.11.11	SC Sagamihara	1-0	Fujieda MYFC	Sagamihara Gion Stadium	3,132
32	2018.11.18	Azul Claro Numazu	0-0	SC Sagamihara	Ashitaka Park Stadium	5,074
33	2018.11.23	FC Ryukyu	5-1	SC Sagamihara	Tapic Kenso Hiyagon Stadium	4,562
34	2018.12.02	SC Sagamihara	1-0	Kagoshima United FC	Sagamihara Gion Stadium	12,612
