= Yoshihiro Masuko =

Japanese footballer

Yoshihiro Masuko 益子義浩
Personal information
- Full name: Yoshihiro Masuko
- Date of birth: 12 July 1987 (age 39)
- Place of birth: Tokyo, Japan
- Height: 1.80 m (5 ft 11 in)
- Position: Midfielder

Team information
- Current team: Grulla Morioka
- Number: 7

Youth career
- 2003–2005: Tokyo Metropolitan; Board of Education
- 2006–2009: Kokushikan University

Senior career*
Years	Team	Apps	(Gls)
2010–2011	Arte Takasaki	50	(7)
2012–2014	Fukushima United FC	52	(10)
2015–	Grulla Morioka	52	(3)
- * Club domestic league appearances and goals as of 23 February 2018

Yoshihiro Masuko (益子義浩, Masuko Yoshihiro; born 12 July 1987 in Tokyo) is a Japanese footballer who plays for Grulla Morioka.

== Club statistics ==
Updated to 23 February 2018.

Club performance			League		Cup		Total	
Season	Club	League	Apps	Goals	Apps	Goals	Apps	Goals
Japan			League		Emperor's Cup		Total	
2010	Arte Takasaki	JFL	19	1	2	0	21	1
2011	Arte Takasaki	JFL	31	6	2	0	33	6
2012	Fukushima United FC	JRL (Tohoku)	12	9	3	3	15	12
2013	Fukushima United FC	JFL	25	1	2	0	27	1
2014	Fukushima United FC	J3 League	15	0	0	0	15	0
2015	Grulla Morioka	J3 League	25	3	1	0	26	3
2016	Grulla Morioka	J3 League	16	0	3	0	19	0
2017	Grulla Morioka	J3 League	11	0	0	0	11	0
Career total			154	20	13	3	167	23
