= Hamamatsu University =

Higher education institution in Shizuoka Prefecture, Japan

Coordinates: 34°48′55″N 137°42′30″E

- 浜松大学
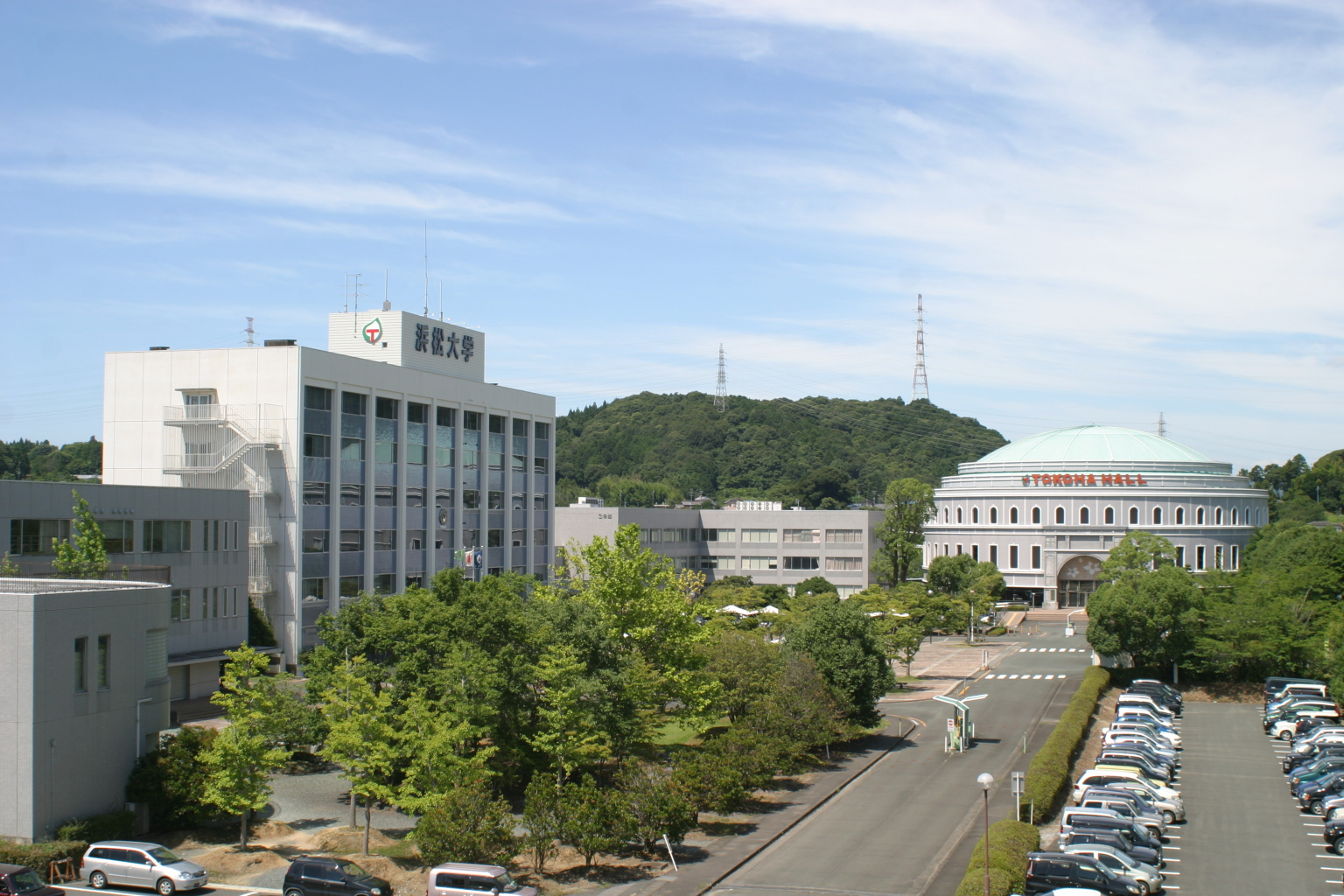
- Overview of Hamamatsu University
- Type: Private
- Active: 1988–2016
- Location: Hamamatsu, Shizuoka, Japan

Hamamatsu University (浜松大学, Hamamatsu Daigaku) was a private university in Hamamatsu City, Shizuoka Prefecture, Japan.

Hamamatsu University was established as Tokoha Gakuen Hamamatsu University (常葉学園浜松大学, Tokoha Gakuen Hamamatsu Daigaku) in 1988. It added a Department of International Economics in 1994, and a graduate studies program in 1996. In 1998, it changed its name to "Hamamatsu University". It closed in 2016.
