= 2017 FC Machida Zelvia season =

FC Machida Zelvia
2017 season
- Manager: Naoki Soma
- Stadium: FC Machida Zelvia
- J2 League: 16th
Home colours	Away colours

2017 FC Machida Zelvia season.

== J2 League ==
=== League table ===
Pos	Team	Pld	W	D	L	GF	GA	GD	Pts
15	Ehime FC	42	14	9	19	54	68	−14	51
16	Machida Zelvia	42	11	17	14	53	53	0	50
17	Zweigen Kanazawa	42	13	10	19	49	67	−18	49

Updated to match(es) played on 28 November 2017. Source: 2017 MEIJI YASUDA J2 LEAGUE League table
Rules for classification: 1) Points; 2) Goal difference; 3) Goals scored

=== Match details ===
J2 League match details
Match	Date	Team	Score	Team	Venue	Attendance
1	2017.02.26	FC Machida Zelvia	0-1	JEF United Chiba	Machida Stadium	8,124
2	2017.03.05	Kamatamare Sanuki	2-2	FC Machida Zelvia	Pikara Stadium	4,806
3	2017.03.12	FC Machida Zelvia	1-1	Fagiano Okayama	Machida Stadium	4,205
4	2017.03.19	Thespakusatsu Gunma	0-1	FC Machida Zelvia	Shoda Shoyu Stadium Gunma	4,694
5	2017.03.26	Zweigen Kanazawa	2-2	FC Machida Zelvia	Ishikawa Athletics Stadium	2,830
6	2017.04.01	FC Machida Zelvia	0-1	FC Gifu	Machida Stadium	2,819
7	2017.04.08	Avispa Fukuoka	1-3	FC Machida Zelvia	Level5 Stadium	6,021
8	2017.04.15	FC Machida Zelvia	1-0	Yokohama FC	Machida Stadium	5,034
9	2017.04.22	FC Machida Zelvia	0-1	Tokushima Vortis	Machida Stadium	2,710
10	2017.04.29	Mito HollyHock	3-2	FC Machida Zelvia	K's denki Stadium Mito	4,119
11	2017.05.03	FC Machida Zelvia	2-1	Roasso Kumamoto	Machida Stadium	3,853
12	2017.05.07	FC Machida Zelvia	0-0	Shonan Bellmare	Machida Stadium	6,203
13	2017.05.13	Matsumoto Yamaga FC	1-1	FC Machida Zelvia	Matsumotodaira Park Stadium	9,389
14	2017.05.17	Nagoya Grampus	2-1	FC Machida Zelvia	Paloma Mizuho Stadium	7,708
15	2017.05.21	FC Machida Zelvia	2-2	Oita Trinita	Machida Stadium	3,528
16	2017.05.27	Renofa Yamaguchi FC	0-1	FC Machida Zelvia	Shimonoseki Stadium	3,369
17	2017.06.04	FC Machida Zelvia	1-2	Ehime FC	Machida Stadium	3,105
18	2017.06.11	Kyoto Sanga FC	2-2	FC Machida Zelvia	Kyoto Nishikyogoku Athletic Stadium	9,119
19	2017.06.17	V-Varen Nagasaki	0-0	FC Machida Zelvia	Transcosmos Stadium Nagasaki	5,687
20	2017.06.25	FC Machida Zelvia	2-4	Tokyo Verdy	Machida Stadium	4,334
21	2017.07.01	Montedio Yamagata	1-3	FC Machida Zelvia	ND Soft Stadium Yamagata	5,423
22	2017.07.08	FC Machida Zelvia	2-0	Thespakusatsu Gunma	Machida Stadium	3,619
23	2017.07.16	FC Machida Zelvia	2-0	Mito HollyHock	Machida Stadium	5,022
24	2017.07.22	FC Gifu	0-2	FC Machida Zelvia	Gifu Nagaragawa Stadium	6,043
25	2017.07.29	FC Machida Zelvia	0-2	Kyoto Sanga FC	Machida Stadium	2,420
26	2017.08.05	FC Machida Zelvia	0-1	Avispa Fukuoka	Machida Stadium	3,334
27	2017.08.11	Oita Trinita	1-3	FC Machida Zelvia	Oita Bank Dome	9,525
28	2017.08.16	FC Machida Zelvia	3-4	Nagoya Grampus	Machida Stadium	6,007
29	2017.08.20	Ehime FC	1-1	FC Machida Zelvia	Ningineer Stadium	2,189
30	2017.08.26	FC Machida Zelvia	1-2	Matsumoto Yamaga FC	Machida Stadium	4,762
31	2017.09.02	Roasso Kumamoto	0-1	FC Machida Zelvia	Egao Kenko Stadium	3,944
32	2017.09.10	Fagiano Okayama	1-1	FC Machida Zelvia	City Light Stadium	8,546
33	2017.09.16	FC Machida Zelvia	0-0	Montedio Yamagata	Machida Stadium	2,519
34	2017.09.23	Tokushima Vortis	2-2	FC Machida Zelvia	Pocarisweat Stadium	3,941
35	2017.10.01	Tokyo Verdy	3-1	FC Machida Zelvia	Ajinomoto Stadium	6,951
36	2017.10.07	FC Machida Zelvia	1-1	V-Varen Nagasaki	Machida Stadium	3,131
37	2017.10.15	FC Machida Zelvia	1-1	Zweigen Kanazawa	Machida Stadium	2,587
38	2017.10.20	Yokohama FC	2-2	FC Machida Zelvia	Kawasaki Todoroki Stadium	2,943
39	2017.10.29	FC Machida Zelvia	1-1	Kamatamare Sanuki	Machida Stadium	2,383
40	2017.11.05	JEF United Chiba	2-1	FC Machida Zelvia	Fukuda Denshi Arena	11,052
41	2017.11.12	FC Machida Zelvia	0-1	Renofa Yamaguchi FC	Machida Stadium	5,478
42	2017.11.19	Shonan Bellmare	1-1	FC Machida Zelvia	Shonan BMW Stadium Hiratsuka	12,480
