= 2016 FC Machida Zelvia season =

FC Machida Zelvia
2016 season
- Manager: Naoki Soma
- Stadium: Machida Stadium
- J2 League: 7th
Home colours	Away colours

2016 FC Machida Zelvia season.

== J2 League ==
=== League table ===
Pos	Team	Pld	W	D	L	GF	GA	GD	Pts	Promotion, qualification or relegation
6	Fagiano Okayama	42	17	14	11	58	44	+14	65	Qualification for promotion playoffs (Note: Only teams that meet J1 license criteria can participate in promotion playoffs. If one or more teams fail to meet the criteria, only eligible teams that finished 3rd to 6th will participate and no replacement teams will be added.)
7	Machida Zelvia	42	18	11	13	53	44	+9	65	
8	Yokohama FC	42	16	11	15	50	51	−1	59	

Updated to match(es) played on 20 November 2016. Source: 2016 MEIJI YASUDA J2 LEAGUE League table
Rules for classification: 1) Points; 2) Goal difference; 3) Goals scored

=== Match details ===
J2 League match details
Match	Date	Team	Score	Team	Venue	Attendance
1	2016.02.28	FC Machida Zelvia	0-1	Cerezo Osaka	Machida Stadium	10,112
2	2016.03.06	FC Machida Zelvia	1-1	Kyoto Sanga FC	Machida Stadium	3,805
3	2016.03.13	Renofa Yamaguchi FC	0-2	FC Machida Zelvia	Ishin Memorial Park Stadium	4,711
4	2016.03.20	FC Machida Zelvia	2-1	Zweigen Kanazawa	Machida Stadium	4,013
5	2016.03.26	Tokyo Verdy	0-1	FC Machida Zelvia	Ajinomoto Stadium	5,166
6	2016.04.03	FC Machida Zelvia	2-0	Hokkaido Consadole Sapporo	Machida Stadium	7,146
7	2016.04.09	Montedio Yamagata	0-1	FC Machida Zelvia	ND Soft Stadium Yamagata	5,320
8	2016.04.17	JEF United Chiba	1-1	FC Machida Zelvia	Fukuda Denshi Arena	7,986
9	2016.04.23	FC Machida Zelvia	1-0	V-Varen Nagasaki	Machida Stadium	4,431
10	2016.04.29	Fagiano Okayama	2-2	FC Machida Zelvia	City Light Stadium	9,170
11	2016.05.03	FC Machida Zelvia	1-1	FC Gifu	Machida Stadium	6,034
12	2016.05.07	Kamatamare Sanuki	0-1	FC Machida Zelvia	Pikara Stadium	2,739
13	2016.05.15	FC Machida Zelvia	0-1	Giravanz Kitakyushu	Machida Stadium	4,722
14	2016.05.22	Matsumoto Yamaga FC	1-0	FC Machida Zelvia	Matsumotodaira Park Stadium	12,462
15	2016.05.28	Roasso Kumamoto	0-2	FC Machida Zelvia	Noevir Stadium Kobe	2,509
16	2016.06.04	FC Machida Zelvia	1-0	Tokushima Vortis	Machida Stadium	4,021
17	2016.06.08	FC Machida Zelvia	1-2	Shimizu S-Pulse	Machida Stadium	6,171
18	2016.06.12	Mito HollyHock	2-2	FC Machida Zelvia	K's denki Stadium Mito	4,280
19	2016.06.19	FC Machida Zelvia	0-1	Ehime FC	Machida Stadium	3,481
20	2016.06.26	Yokohama FC	1-0	FC Machida Zelvia	NHK Spring Mitsuzawa Football Stadium	6,871
21	2016.07.03	Thespakusatsu Gunma	2-2	FC Machida Zelvia	Shoda Shoyu Stadium Gunma	2,374
22	2016.07.10	FC Machida Zelvia	2-1	Montedio Yamagata	Machida Stadium	4,412
23	2016.07.16	FC Machida Zelvia	2-3	JEF United Chiba	Machida Stadium	6,412
24	2016.07.20	Cerezo Osaka	1-3	FC Machida Zelvia	Kincho Stadium	9,323
25	2016.07.24	FC Machida Zelvia	3-3	Mito HollyHock	Machida Stadium	3,448
26	2016.07.31	V-Varen Nagasaki	1-0	FC Machida Zelvia	Nagasaki Stadium	4,433
27	2016.08.07	FC Machida Zelvia	2-3	Renofa Yamaguchi FC	Machida Stadium	4,107
28	2016.08.11	Tokushima Vortis	1-1	FC Machida Zelvia	Pocarisweat Stadium	3,703
29	2016.08.14	Kyoto Sanga FC	1-0	FC Machida Zelvia	Kyoto Nishikyogoku Athletic Stadium	4,622
30	2016.08.21	FC Machida Zelvia	0-0	Thespakusatsu Gunma	Machida Stadium	3,679
31	2016.09.11	FC Machida Zelvia	1-1	Yokohama FC	Machida Stadium	5,101
32	2016.09.18	Zweigen Kanazawa	1-2	FC Machida Zelvia	Ishikawa Athletics Stadium	2,076
33	2016.09.26	Hokkaido Consadole Sapporo	3-2	FC Machida Zelvia	Sapporo Dome	11,914
34	2016.10.02	FC Machida Zelvia	2-1	Tokyo Verdy	Machida Stadium	5,016
35	2016.10.08	Shimizu S-Pulse	2-0	FC Machida Zelvia	IAI Stadium Nihondaira	10,607
36	2016.10.16	FC Machida Zelvia	1-0	Roasso Kumamoto	Machida Stadium	4,218
37	2016.10.22	FC Gifu	1-2	FC Machida Zelvia	Gifu Nagaragawa Stadium	4,674
38	2016.10.30	FC Machida Zelvia	0-1	Kamatamare Sanuki	Machida Stadium	3,580
39	2016.11.03	FC Machida Zelvia	1-1	Fagiano Okayama	Machida Stadium	4,163
40	2016.11.06	Giravanz Kitakyushu	1-3	FC Machida Zelvia	Honjo Stadium	2,937
41	2016.11.12	FC Machida Zelvia	2-1	Matsumoto Yamaga FC	Machida Stadium	9,519
42	2016.11.20	Ehime FC	0-1	FC Machida Zelvia	Ningineer Stadium	4,519
