= 2014 JEF United Chiba season =

JEF United Chiba
2014 season
- Manager: Jun Suzuki; Kazuo Saito; Takashi Sekizuka
- Stadium: Fukuda Denshi Arena
- J2 League: 3rd

2014 JEF United Chiba season.

== J2 League ==
Match	Date	Team	Score	Team	Venue	Attendance
1	2014.03.02	JEF United Chiba	0-2	Tochigi SC	Fukuda Denshi Arena	8,395
2	2014.03.09	JEF United Chiba	1-0	Fagiano Okayama	Fukuda Denshi Arena	7,412
3	2014.03.16	Tokyo Verdy	1-1	JEF United Chiba	Ajinomoto Stadium	5,136
4	2014.03.22	V-Varen Nagasaki	2-1	JEF United Chiba	Nagasaki Stadium	3,757
5	2014.03.30	JEF United Chiba	3-0	Roasso Kumamoto	Fukuda Denshi Arena	5,957
6	2014.04.05	Mito HollyHock	1-2	JEF United Chiba	K's denki Stadium Mito	4,140
7	2014.04.13	JEF United Chiba	0-6	Shonan Bellmare	Fukuda Denshi Arena	9,305
8	2014.04.20	Kataller Toyama	1-1	JEF United Chiba	Toyama Stadium	5,733
9	2014.04.26	JEF United Chiba	1-1	Kamatamare Sanuki	Fukuda Denshi Arena	6,581
10	2014.04.29	Júbilo Iwata	2-0	JEF United Chiba	Yamaha Stadium	6,108
11	2014.05.03	JEF United Chiba	3-2	Thespakusatsu Gunma	Fukuda Denshi Arena	11,833
12	2014.05.06	FC Gifu	2-2	JEF United Chiba	Gifu Nagaragawa Stadium	6,524
13	2014.05.11	Montedio Yamagata	1-1	JEF United Chiba	ND Soft Stadium Yamagata	5,812
14	2014.05.18	JEF United Chiba	2-0	Consadole Sapporo	Fukuda Denshi Arena	9,480
15	2014.05.24	Yokohama FC	0-0	JEF United Chiba	NHK Spring Mitsuzawa Football Stadium	5,887
16	2014.05.31	JEF United Chiba	1-0	Ehime FC	Fukuda Denshi Arena	8,083
17	2014.06.07	Avispa Fukuoka	1-0	JEF United Chiba	Level5 Stadium	6,359
18	2014.06.14	JEF United Chiba	3-0	Kyoto Sanga FC	Fukuda Denshi Arena	9,336
19	2014.06.21	Giravanz Kitakyushu	1-0	JEF United Chiba	Honjo Stadium	1,462
20	2014.06.28	JEF United Chiba	0-1	Matsumoto Yamaga FC	Fukuda Denshi Arena	13,243
21	2014.07.05	Oita Trinita	2-4	JEF United Chiba	Oita Bank Dome	6,727
22	2014.07.20	Tochigi SC	0-2	JEF United Chiba	Tochigi Green Stadium	6,325
23	2014.07.26	JEF United Chiba	1-1	V-Varen Nagasaki	Fukuda Denshi Arena	11,458
24	2014.07.30	JEF United Chiba	2-0	Montedio Yamagata	Fukuda Denshi Arena	8,149
25	2014.08.03	Shonan Bellmare	1-1	JEF United Chiba	Shonan BMW Stadium Hiratsuka	8,637
26	2014.08.10	JEF United Chiba	0-0	Yokohama FC	Fukuda Denshi Arena	7,903
27	2014.08.17	Roasso Kumamoto	0-0	JEF United Chiba	Umakana-Yokana Stadium	5,357
28	2014.08.24	Fagiano Okayama	1-0	JEF United Chiba	Kanko Stadium	7,548
29	2014.08.31	JEF United Chiba	1-0	Mito HollyHock	Fukuda Denshi Arena	7,734
30	2014.09.06	Kyoto Sanga FC	3-3	JEF United Chiba	Kyoto Nishikyogoku Athletic Stadium	6,833
31	2014.09.14	JEF United Chiba	1-3	Giravanz Kitakyushu	Fukuda Denshi Arena	8,524
32	2014.09.20	JEF United Chiba	1-0	FC Gifu	Fukuda Denshi Arena	7,276
33	2014.09.23	Ehime FC	2-2	JEF United Chiba	Ningineer Stadium	3,107
34	2014.09.28	JEF United Chiba	0-0	Tokyo Verdy	Fukuda Denshi Arena	12,346
35	2014.10.04	JEF United Chiba	3-0	Avispa Fukuoka	Fukuda Denshi Arena	7,884
36	2014.10.11	Consadole Sapporo	0-2	JEF United Chiba	Sapporo Atsubetsu Stadium	7,844
37	2014.10.19	JEF United Chiba	2-1	Oita Trinita	Fukuda Denshi Arena	10,326
38	2014.10.26	Thespakusatsu Gunma	1-2	JEF United Chiba	Shoda Shoyu Stadium Gunma	5,805
39	2014.11.01	JEF United Chiba	2-2	Júbilo Iwata	Fukuda Denshi Arena	14,575
40	2014.11.09	Matsumoto Yamaga FC	2-1	JEF United Chiba	Matsumotodaira Park Stadium	18,114
41	2014.11.15	JEF United Chiba	2-1	Kataller Toyama	Fukuda Denshi Arena	10,199
42	2014.11.23	Kamatamare Sanuki	0-1	JEF United Chiba	Kagawa Marugame Stadium	3,628
