= Kaijiro Fujiyoshi =

Japanese footballer

Kaijiro Fujiyoshi 藤吉 皆二朗
Personal information
- Full name: Kaijiro Fujiyoshi
- Date of birth: 11 January 1992 (age 34)
- Place of birth: Yokohama, Japan
- Height: 1.75 m (5 ft 9 in)
- Position: Goalkeeper

Youth career
- –2009: Yokogawa Musashino Youth

Senior career*
Years	Team	Apps	(Gls)
2010–2013	Yokogawa Musashino	35	(0)
2014–2017	SC Sagamihara	25	(0)
2018–2020	Nara Club	66	(0)
- * Club domestic league appearances and goals as of 25 April 2025

Kaijiro Fujiyoshi (藤吉皆二朗, Fujiyoshi, Kaijiro; born 11 January 1992 in Yokohama, Japan) is a Japanese footballer who played for Nara Club, SC Sagamihara, and Yokogawa Musashino FC from 2010 until his retirement in 2020.

== Club statistics ==
Updated to 23 February 2020.

Club performance			League		Cup		Total	
Season	Club	League	Apps	Goals	Apps	Goals	Apps	Goals
Japan			League		Emperor's Cup		Total	
2010	Yokogawa Musashino	JFL	1	0	–		1	0
2011	Yokogawa Musashino	JFL	2	0	–		2	0
2012	Yokogawa Musashino	JFL	8	0	2	0	10	0
2013	Yokogawa Musashino	JFL	21	0	1	0	22	0
2014	SC Sagamihara	J3 League	5	0	–		5	0
2015	SC Sagamihara	J3 League	0	0	–		0	0
2016	SC Sagamihara	J3 League	6	0	–		6	0
2017	SC Sagamihara	J3 League	14	0	–		14	0
2018	Nara Club	JFL	30	0	1	0	31	0
2019	Nara Club	JFL	30	0	0	0	30	0
2019	Nara Club	JFL	5	0	0	0	5	0
Career total			126	0	4	0	130	0
