= Saku Athletic Stadium =

Athletic stadium in Saku, Nagano, Japan

- 佐久総合運動公園陸上競技場
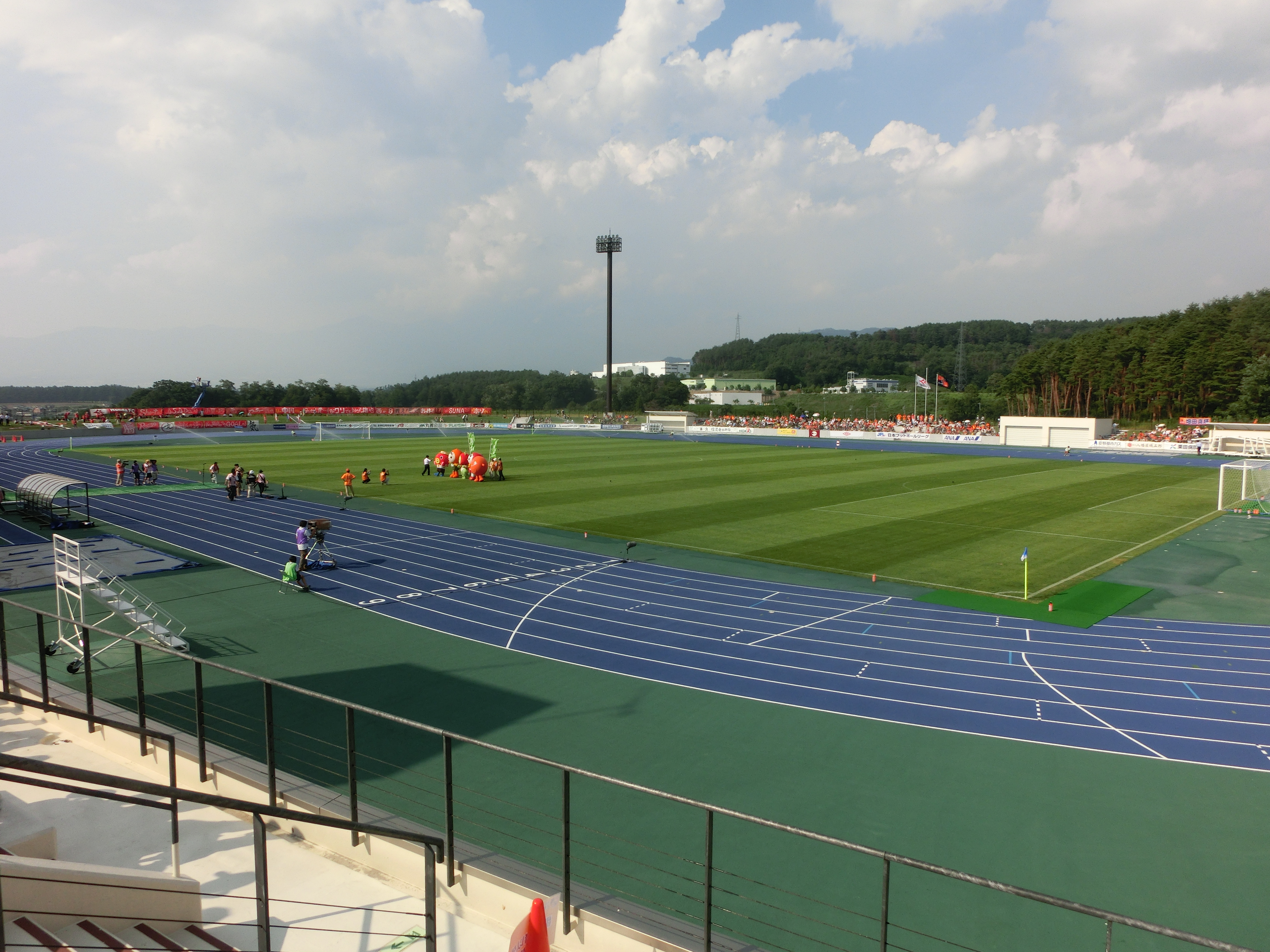
- Interactive map of Saku Athletic Stadium
- Location: Saku, Nagano, Japan
- Coordinates: 36.2382°N 138.4941°E
- Owner: Saku City
- Capacity: 9,500

Construction
- Opened: 2013

Tenant
- AC Nagano Parceiro Ladies

Website
- Official site

Saku Athletic Stadium (佐久総合運動公園陸上競技場) is an athletic stadium in Saku, Nagano Prefecture, Japan. It is one of the home stadiums of football club AC Nagano Parceiro Ladies.

It was one of the home stadiums of football club AC Nagano Parceiro in 2014.
