= Shinichi Mukai =

Japanese footballer

Personal information
- Date of birth: June 15, 1985 (age 41)
- Place of birth: Yokohama, Japan
- Height: 1.70 m (5 ft 7 in)
- Position: Midfielder

Team information
- Current team: Nara Club
- Number: 10

Youth career
- 2004–2007: Hosei University

Senior career*
Years	Team	Apps	(Gls)
2008–2009	Tochigi SC	50	(1)
2010	Tokyo Verdy	1	(0)
2011–2012	Nagano Parceiro	64	(20)
2013	Machida Zelvia	20	(4)
2014–2015	Nagano Parceiro	60	(3)
2016–	Nara Club	105	(9)
- * Club domestic league appearances and goals as of 2 January 2020

Shinichi Mukai (向 慎一, Mukai Shinichi; born June 15, 1985) is a Japanese football player. He played for Nara Club before retiring in 2022.

== Career statistics ==
Updated to 2 January 2020.

Appearances and goals by club, season and competition
Club	Season	League			Emperor's Cup		Total	
Club	Season	Division	Apps	Goals	Apps	Goals	Apps	Goals
Tochigi SC	2008	JFL	23	0	2	0	25	0
Tochigi SC	2009	J2 League	27	1	1	0	28	1
Tokyo Verdy	2010	J2 League	1	0	0	0	1	0
Nagano Parceiro	2011	JFL	32	10	—		32	10
Nagano Parceiro	2012	JFL	32	10	3	1	35	11
Machida Zelvia	2013	JFL	20	4	—		20	4
Nagano Parceiro	2014	J3 League	32	2	2	0	34	2
Nagano Parceiro	2015	J3 League	28	1	1	0	29	1
Nara Club	2016	JFL	28	3	2	0	30	3
Nara Club	2017	JFL	30	3	1	0	31	3
Nara Club	2018	JFL	25	1	1	0	26	1
Nara Club	2019	JFL	22	2	1	0	23	2
Career total			300	37	14	1	314	38
