= Takahiro Oshima =

Japanese footballer

Takahiro Oshima 大島 嵩弘
Personal information
- Full name: Takahiro Oshima
- Date of birth: April 14, 1988 (age 38)
- Place of birth: Noda, Chiba, Japan
- Height: 1.78 m (5 ft 10 in)
- Position: Defender

Team information
- Current team: Tochigi City FC
- Number: 5

Youth career
- 2001–2006: Kashiwa Reysol Youth

Senior career*
Years	Team	Apps	(Gls)
2007–2009	Kashiwa Reysol	1	(0)
2009–2019	Nagano Parceiro	245	(19)
2020–	Tochigi City FC		
Medal record
Kashiwa Reysol
Runner-up	Emperor's Cup	2008
- * Club domestic league appearances and goals as of 23 February 2020

Takahiro Oshima (大島 嵩弘, Oshima Takahiro; born April 14, 1988) is a Japanese football player currently featuring for Tochigi City FC.

== Career ==
Oshima previously played for Kashiwa Reysol in the J. League Division 1. After a decade in Nagano, Oshima joined Tochigi City FC in December 2019.

== Club statistics ==
Updated to 23 February 2020.

Club performance			League		Cup		League Cup		Other		Total	
Season	Club	League	Apps	Goals	Apps	Goals	Apps	Goals	Apps	Goals	Apps	Goals
Japan			League		Emperor's Cup		J. League Cup		Other		Total	
2007	Kashiwa Reysol	J1 League	0	0	0	0	0	0	-		0	0
2008	Kashiwa Reysol	J1 League	1	0	0	0	0	0	-		1	0
2009	Kashiwa Reysol	J1 League	0	0	0	0	0	0	-		0	0
2009	Nagano Parceiro	JRL (Hokushinetsu)	3	0	-		-		-		3	0
2010	Nagano Parceiro	JRL (Hokushinetsu)	13	6	-		-		-		13	6
2011	Nagano Parceiro	JFL	30	1	-		-		-		30	1
2012	Nagano Parceiro	JFL	19	1	3	1	-		-		22	2
2013	Nagano Parceiro	JFL	34	1	4	1	-		-		38	2
2014	Nagano Parceiro	J3 League	32	1	2	0	-		2	0	36	1
2015	Nagano Parceiro	J3 League	35	3	2	0	-		-		37	3
2016	Nagano Parceiro	J3 League	11	2	3	0	-		-		14	2
2017	Nagano Parceiro	J3 League	32	2	1	0	-		-		33	2
2018	Nagano Parceiro	J3 League	21	2	1	0	-		-		22	2
2019	Nagano Parceiro	J3 League	14	0	2	0	-		-		16	0
Total			246	19	18	2	0	0	2	0	265	21
