= Kohei Takano =

Japanese footballer

Personal information
- Full name: Kohei Takano
- Date of birth: April 3, 1985 (age 41)
- Place of birth: Chiba, Japan
- Height: 1.70 m (5 ft 7 in)
- Position: Defender

Youth career
- 2001–2003: Kashima Antlers
- 2004–2007: Tokyo Gakugei University

Senior career*
Years	Team	Apps	(Gls)
2008–2014	AC Nagano Parceiro	141	(15)
Total		141	(15)
- * Club domestic league appearances and goals

Kohei Takano (高野 耕平, Takano Kōhei; born April 3, 1985) is a former Japanese football player.

== Playing career ==
Kohei Takano played for AC Nagano Parceiro from 2008 to 2014.
