= Yoshitaka Ohashi =

Japanese footballer

Personal information
- Full name: Yoshitaka Ohashi
- Date of birth: July 1, 1983 (age 43)
- Place of birth: Saitama, Japan
- Height: 1.69 m (5 ft 6 1/2 in)
- Position: Midfielder

Youth career
- 2002–2005: Sendai University

Senior career*
Years	Team	Apps	(Gls)
2006–2007	Vegalta Sendai	0	(0)
2007–2008	NEC Tokin	17	(4)
2009–2015	AC Nagano Parceiro	172	(17)
Total		189	(21)
- * Club domestic league appearances and goals

Yoshitaka Ohashi (大橋 良隆, Ohashi Yoshitaka; born July 1, 1983) is a former Japanese football player.

== Playing career ==
Yoshitaka Ohashi joined to J2 League club; Vegalta Sendai in 2006. In July 2007, he moved to NEC Tokin. In 2009, he moved to AC Nagano Parceiro and played to 2015.
