= Yuki Kawabe =

Japanese footballer

Personal information
- Full name: Yuki Kawabe
- Date of birth: April 2, 1987 (age 39)
- Place of birth: Tokyo, Japan
- Height: 1.82 m (5 ft 11 1/2 in)
- Position: Defender

Team information
- Current team: Saurcos Fukui
- Number: 4

Youth career
- 2006–2009: Kokushikan University

Senior career*
Years	Team	Apps	(Gls)
2010–2011	FC Machida Zelvia	16	(3)
2012–2014	AC Nagano Parceiro	54	(4)
2015	FC Ryukyu	29	(1)
2016–	Saurcos Fukui		
Total		99	(8)
- * Club domestic league appearances and goals as of December 31, 2015

Yuki Kawabe (川邊 裕紀, Kawabe Yūki; born April 2, 1987) is a Japanese football player. He plays for Saurcos Fukui.

== Playing career ==
Yuki Kawabe joined the FC Machida Zelvia in 2010. He moved to AC Nagano Parceiro in 2012 and played for the club until 2014. He then moved to FC Ryukyu in 2015 and to Saurcos Fukui in 2016.
