= Minami Nagano Sports Park Stadium =

Football stadium in Nagano, Japan

- 南長野運動公園総合球技場
- Nagano U Stadium
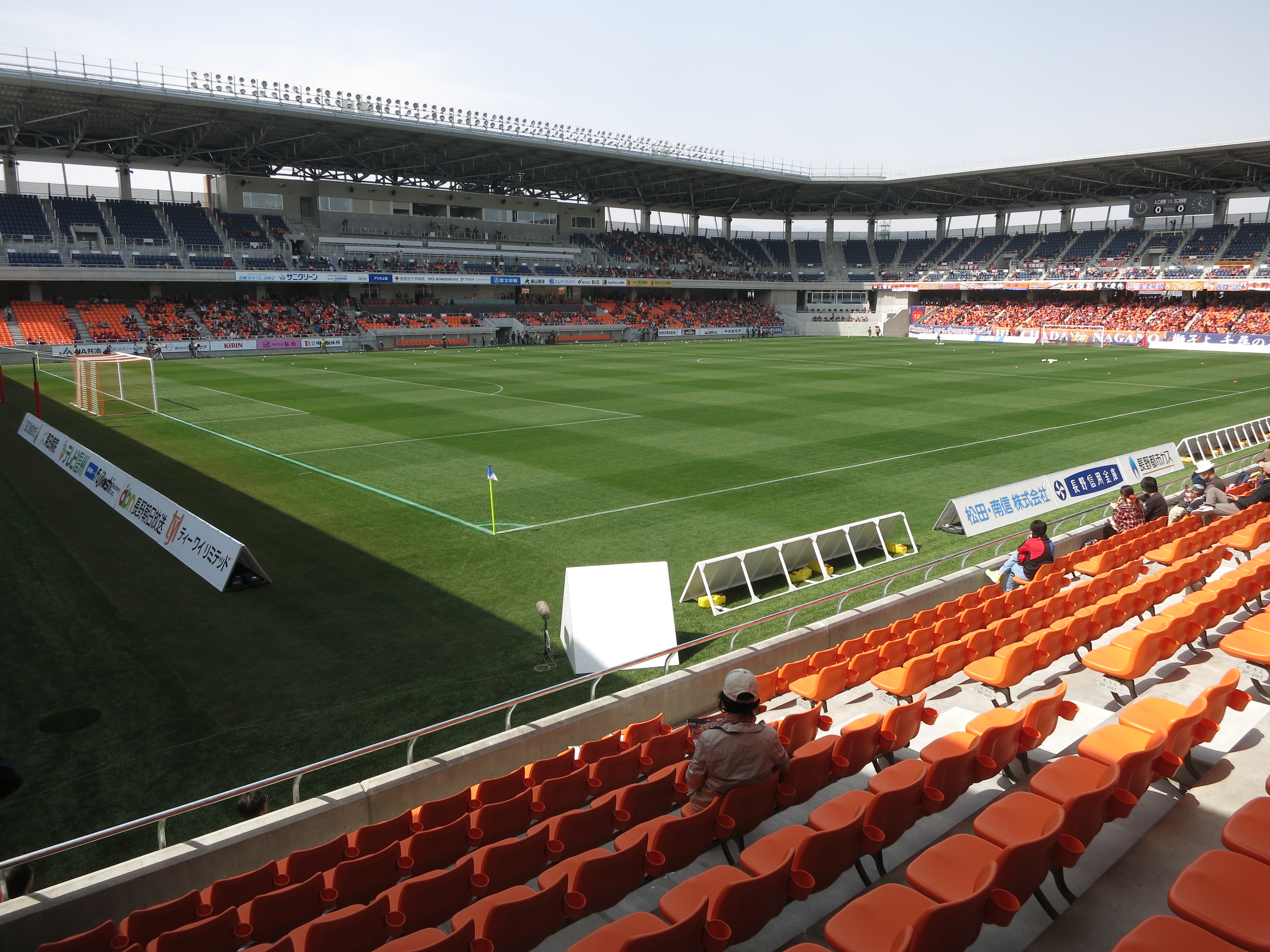

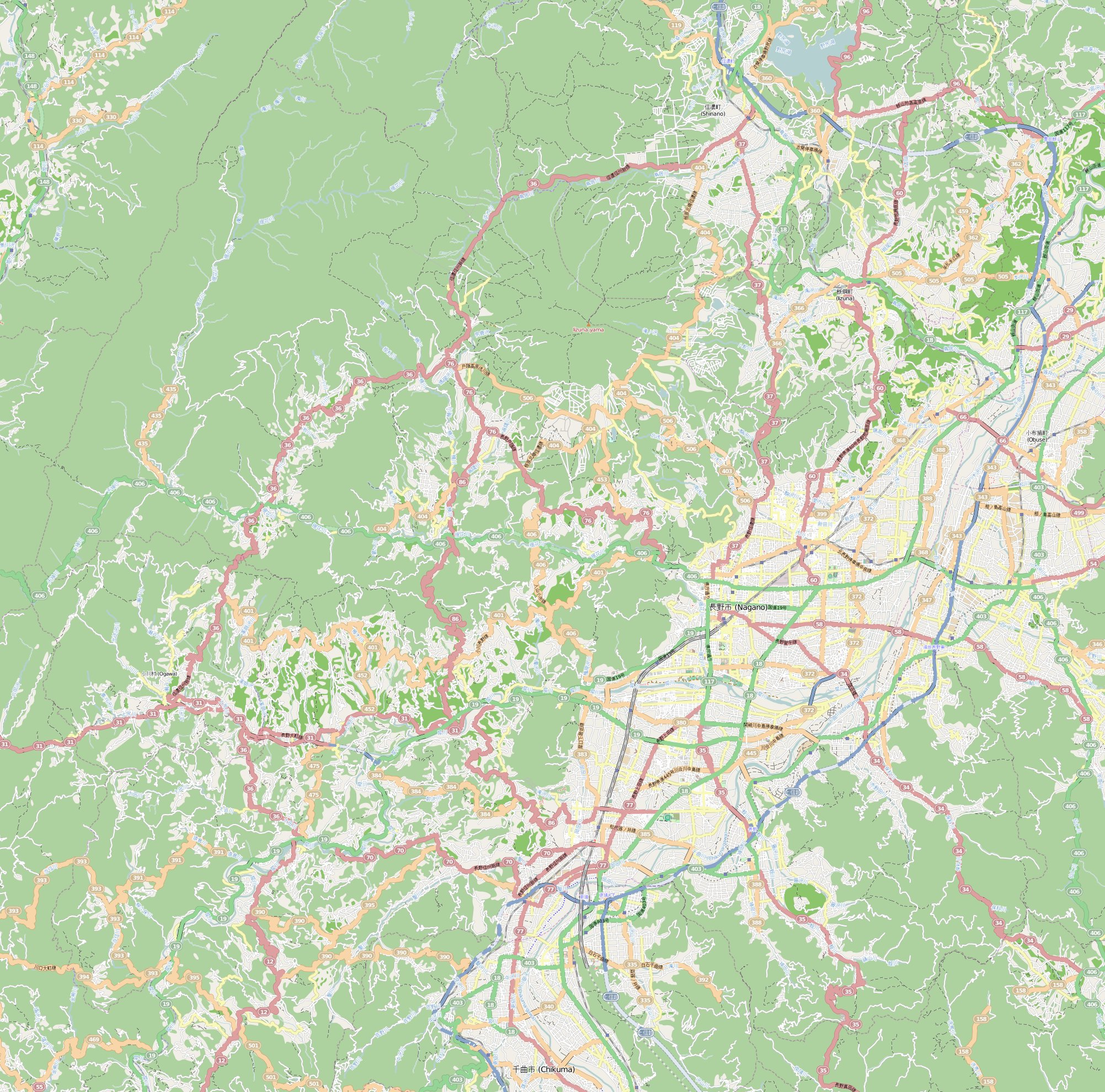
- Location within Nagano, Nagano Location within Nagano Prefecture Location within Japan
- Interactive map of Minami Nagano Sports Park Stadium
- Location: Nagano, Nagano, Japan
- Owner: Nagano City
- Operator: Minami Nagano Sports Management JV
- Capacity: 15,491

Construction
- Opened: 2015

Tenants
- AC Nagano Parceiro; AC Nagano Parceiro Ladies

Website
- Official site

Minami Nagano Sports Park Stadium (南長野運動公園総合球技場) a.k.a. Nagano U Stadium (長野Uスタジアム) is a football stadium in Nagano, Nagano, Japan. It is the home ground of J3 League club AC Nagano Parceiro and L.League club AC Nagano Parceiro Ladies.
