= Machida GION Stadium =

Multi-use stadium in Machida, Japan

- 町田GIONスタジアム
- Nozuta Stadium
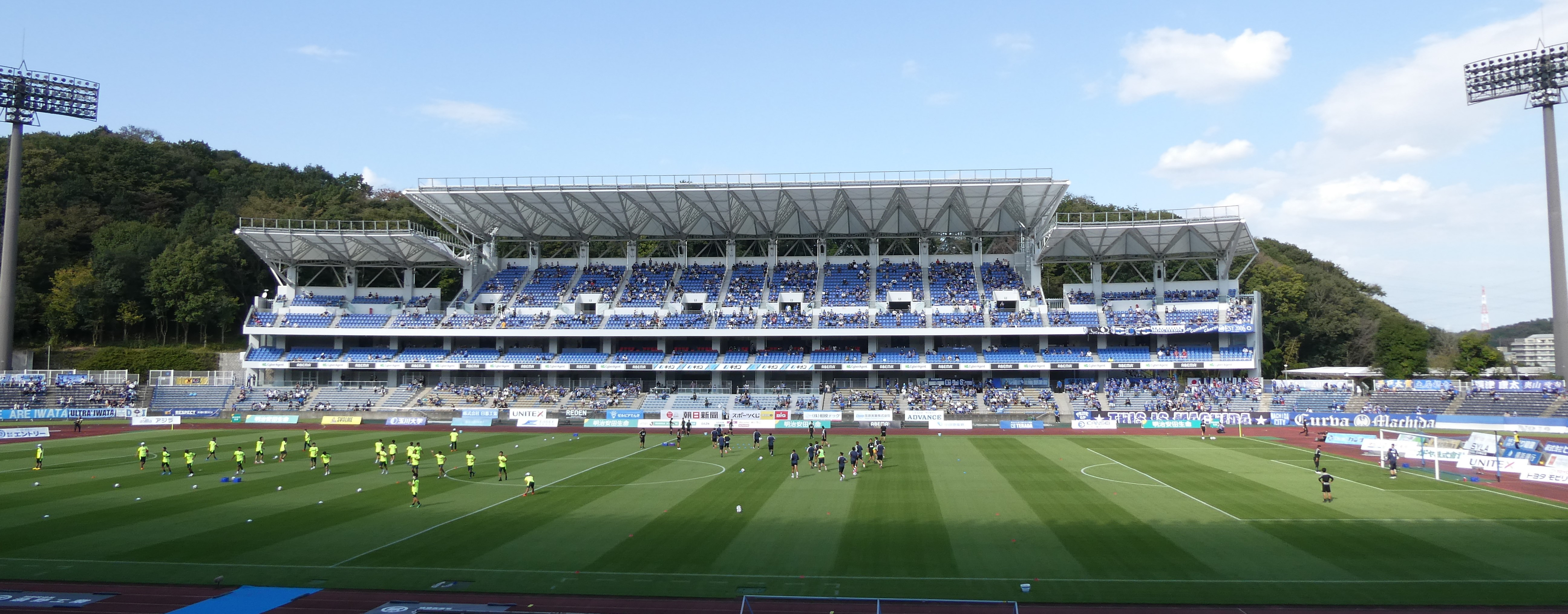
- Panoramic view of the pitch and stands (October 2021)
- Interactive map of Machida GION Stadium
- Location: Machida, Tokyo, Japan
- Coordinates: 35°35′33″N 139°26′20″E
- Owner: Machida City
- Operator: Sports Park Partners Machida
- Capacity: 15,489
- Surface: Grass

Construction
- Opened: October 1990
- Expanded: 2021

Tenants
- FC Machida Zelvia; Canon Eagles

The Machida GION Stadium (町田市立陸上競技場, Machida Shiritsu Rikujō Kyōgijō) or Machida Municipal Athletic Stadium or Machida City Nozuta Park Stadium (on AFC Competitions) is a multi-use stadium in Machida, Tokyo, Japan, a.k.a. the “Nozuta Stadium” (野津田競技場, Nozuta Kyōgijō) because it is located in Nozuta Park (野津田公園, Nozuta Kōen). It is currently used mostly for football matches and also sometimes for rugby union and athletics events. This stadium has a seating capacity of 15,489.

== Gallery ==
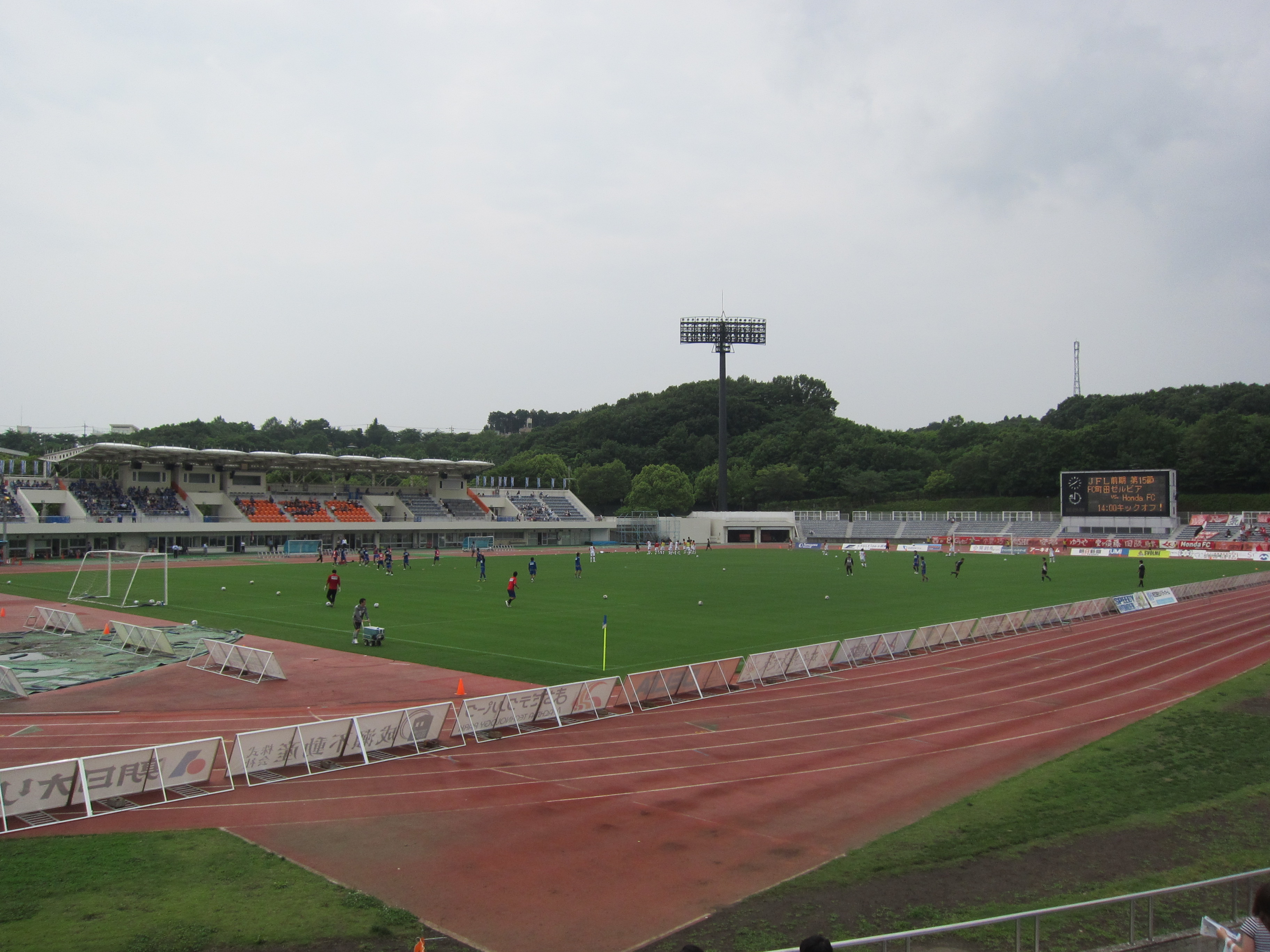

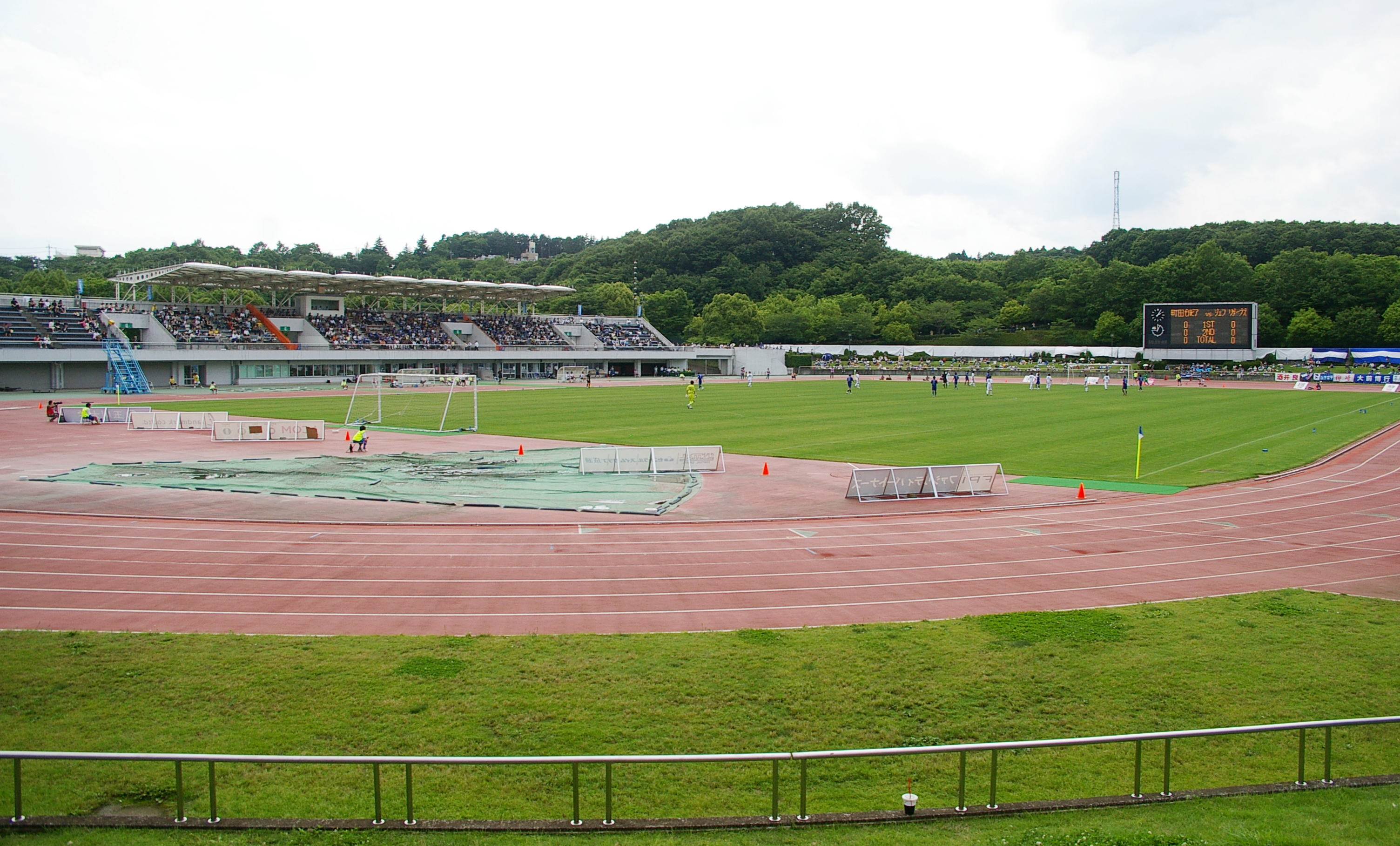

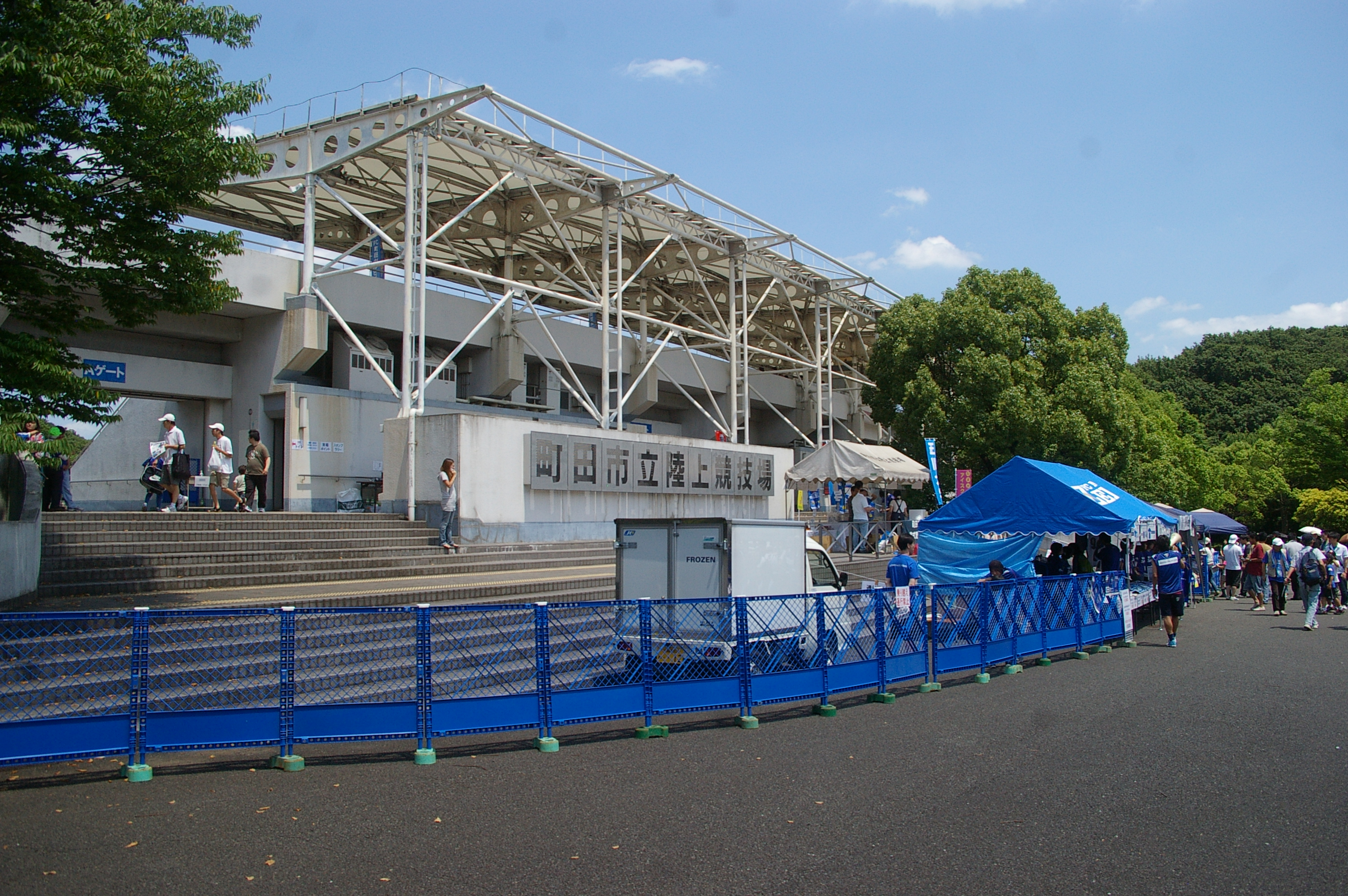

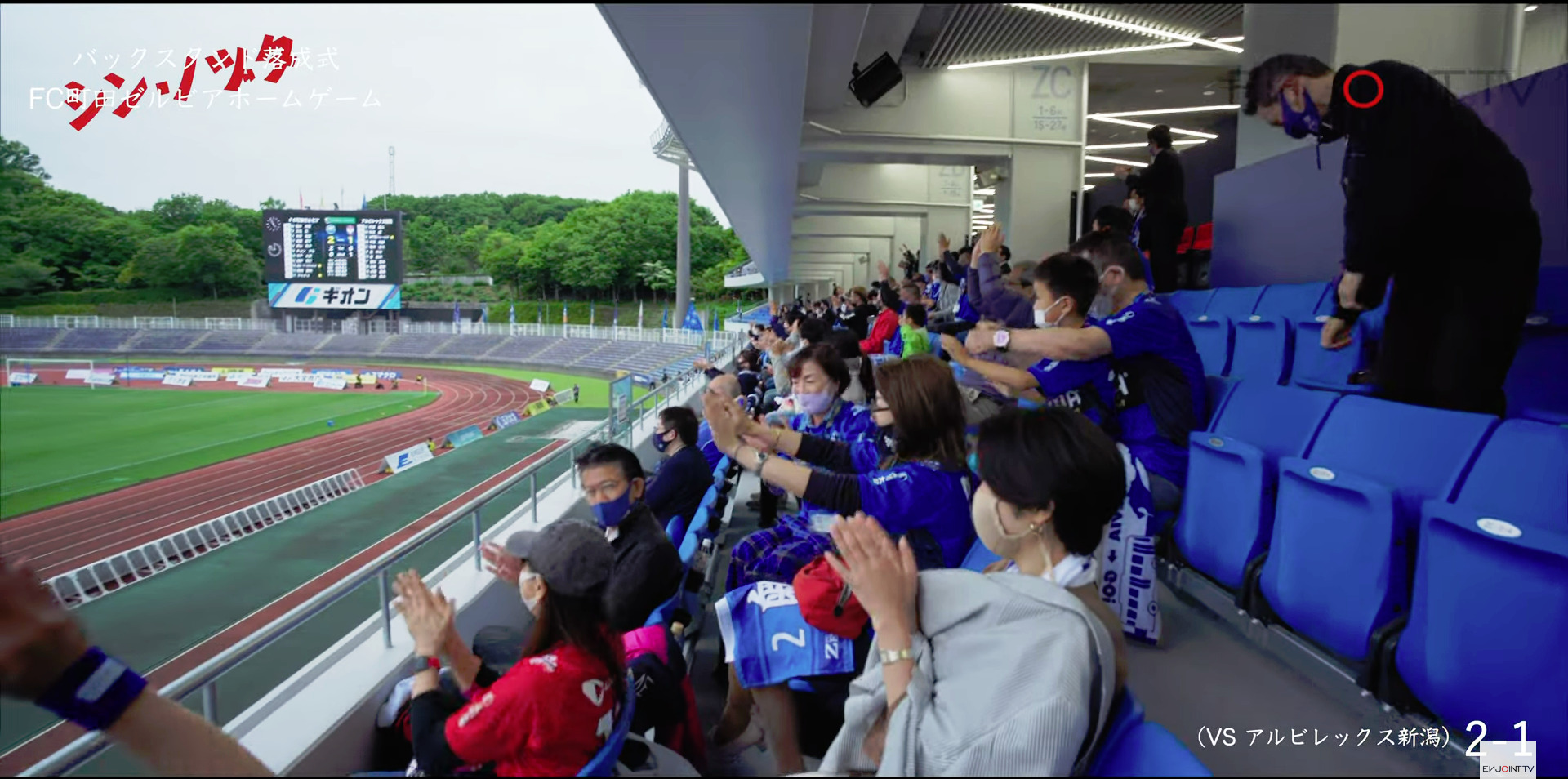
New Back Stands in 2021
