= 2012 FC Machida Zelvia season =

FC Machida Zelvia
2012 season
- Manager: Osvaldo Ardiles
- J.League Division 2: 22nd
- Emperor's Cup: 3rd Round
- Top goalscorer: League: Takafumi Suzuki (7); All: Takafumi Suzuki (7)
Home colours	Away colours

The 2012 FC Machida Zelvia season saw FC Machida Zelvia compete in J.League Division 2 for the first time after being promoted from the 2011 Japan Football League. Machida Zelvia were relegated back to the Japan Football League on the last day of the season after a 0-3 defeat to Shonan Bellmare. They are also competing in the 2012 Emperor's Cup.

== Players ==
As of March 7, 2012.

Note: Flags indicate national team as defined under FIFA eligibility rules; some limited exceptions apply. Players may hold more than one non-FIFA nationality.

No.	Pos.	Nation	Player
1	GK	JPN	Tomohito Shugyo
2	DF	JPN	Kazuki Tsuda
3	DF	JPN	Taisei Fujita
4	MF	JPN	Kazuyuki Toda
5	DF	JPN	Masakazu Tashiro
6	DF	JPN	Kosuke Ota
7	FW	JPN	Yoshinori Katsumata
8	MF	JPN	Takumi Ogawa
10	FW	SRB	Dragan Dimić
11	MF	JPN	Ryo Sakai
13	DF	JPN	Ryuto Otake
14	DF	JPN	Jun Sonoda
15	MF	JPN	Shohei Yanagizaki
16	MF	JPN	Yoshihiro Shoji

No.	Pos.	Nation	Player
17	MF	JPN	Takafumi Suzuki
18	DF	JPN	Kai Miki
19	MF	JPN	Yuki Kitai
20	FW	JPN	Koji Suzuki
21	GK	JPN	Takashi Aizawa
22	GK	JPN	Ryosuke Ishida
23	DF	JPN	Kento Kuri
25	FW	JPN	Kazuki Hiramoto
26	MF	SCO	Colin Marshall
27	MF	JPN	Kohei Kato
28	MF	JPN	Kohei Shimoda
29	DF	KOR	Lee Gang-Jin
31	GK	JPN	Takahiro Noguchi
33	MF	JPN	Shuto Kono

== Transfers ==
=== Winter ===
In: Note: Flags indicate national team as defined under FIFA eligibility rules; some limited exceptions apply. Players may hold more than one non-FIFA nationality.

No.	Pos.	Nation	Player
26	MF	SCO	Colin Marshall (from (Iceland) Víkingur)

Out: Note: Flags indicate national team as defined under FIFA eligibility rules; some limited exceptions apply. Players may hold more than one non-FIFA nationality.

No.	Pos.	Nation	Player

=== Summer ===
In: Note: Flags indicate national team as defined under FIFA eligibility rules; some limited exceptions apply. Players may hold more than one non-FIFA nationality.

No.	Pos.	Nation	Player
24	DF	JPN	Katsuya Senzaki (Transferred from Vanraure Hachinohe)
29	DF	KOR	Lee Gang-Jin (loan from (South Korea) Jeonbuk Hyundai)
33	MF	JPN	Shuto Kono (loan from F.C. Tokyo)

Out: Note: Flags indicate national team as defined under FIFA eligibility rules; some limited exceptions apply. Players may hold more than one non-FIFA nationality.

No.	Pos.	Nation	Player
8	MF	JPN	Takumi Ogawa (loan to Fujieda MYFC)
26	MF	SCO	Colin Marshall (Released)

== Competitions ==
=== J. League 2 ===
==== Matches ====
4 March 2012 1	Ehime	2 - 0	Machida Zelvia	Ningineer Stadium
Sunday 16:05	Alair 6'; Sonoda 62' (o.g.)	Report		Attendance: 3,926; Referee: Yamamoto

11 March 2012 2	Machida Zelvia	0 - 1	Avispa Fukuoka	Machida Municipal Athletic Stadium
Sunday 13:04		Report	27' Suzuki	Attendance: 4,286; Referee: Iemoto

17 March 2012 3	Gainare Tottori	0 - 3	Machida Zelvia	THE TOTTORI BANK Bird Stadium
Saturday 13:04		Report	47' Hiramoto; 89', 90' Katsumata	Attendance: 2,477; Referee: Ueda

20 March 2012 4	Machida Zelvia	1 - 0	Roasso Kumamoto	Machida Municipal Athletic Stadium
Tuesday 13:04	Kitai 59'	Report		Attendance: 4,351; Referee: Mikami

25 March 2012 5	Kyoto Sanga	2 - 1	Machida Zelvia	Kyoto Nishikyogoku Athletic Stadium
Sunday 13:00	Nakamura 61'; Hara 83'	Report	89' Hiramoto	Attendance: 4,795; Referee: Sato

1 April 2012 6	Machida Zelvia	1 - 2	Tokyo Verdy	Machida Municipal Athletic Stadium
Sunday	Kitai 66'	Summary	Abe 47'; Sugimoto 78'	Attendance: 6,288; Referee: Noda

8 April 2012 7	Shonan Bellmare	2 - 0	Machida Zelvia	Hiratsuka Athletics Stadium
Sunday	Endo 67', 90+2' (pen.)	Summary	Tsuda (yellow card) 22' (yellow-red card) 90+1'	Attendance: 7,035; Referee: Hayakawa

15 April 2012 8	Machida Zelvia	0 - 3	Tochigi	Machida Municipal Athletic Stadium
Sunday		Summary	Takagi 50'; Onodera 55'; Sabia 81'	Attendance: 3,682; Referee: Iida

22 April 2012 9	Ventforet Kofu	1 - 1	Machida Zelvia	Yamanashi Chuo Bank Stadium
Sunday	Shimoda 11'	Summary	Davi 21' (pen.)	Attendance: 7,451; Referee: Yamamoto

27 April 2012 10	Machida Zelvia	0 - 1	Matsumoto Yamaga	Machida Municipal Athletic Stadium
Friday		Summary	Funayama 76' (pen.)

30 April 2012 11	Yokohama	2 - 4	Machida Zelvia	Mitsuzawa Stadium
Monday	Okubo 69', 82'	Summary	T.Suzuki 33', 55', 72'; Hiramoto 44'	Attendance: 7,118

3 May 2012 12	Machida Zelvia	0 - 1	Giravanz Kitakyushu	Machida Municipal Athletic Stadium
Thursday		Summary	Ikemoto 77' (pen.)	Attendance: 3,021

6 May 2012 13	Kataller Toyama	1 - 1	Machida Zelvia	Toyama Athletic Recreation Park Stadium
Sunday	Fukuda 90+3'	Summary	T.Suzuki 50'	Attendance: 2,101

13 May 2012 14	Machida Zelvia	1 - 6	JEF United Chiba	Machida Municipal Athletic Stadium
Sunday	Hiramoto 69'	Summary	Tanaka 3', 62', 79'; Fujita 41', 74'; Fukai 59'	Attendance: 6,173

20 May 2012 15	Oita Trinita	2 - 1	Machida Zelvia	Ōita Bank Dome
Sunday	Mitsuhira 24'; Sakuda 84'	Summary	T.Suzuki 42'	Attendance: 7,253

27 May 2012 16	Machida Zelvia	0 - 0	Mito HollyHock	Machida Municipal Athletic Stadium
Sunday	Tashiro (yellow card) 90+4'	Report	Omoto (yellow card) 58'	Attendance: 3,642; Referee: Kazuyoshi Enomoto

1 June 2012 17	Tokushima Vortis	1 - 0	Machida Zelvia	Naruto Athletic Stadium
Friday	Eto 81'	Summary

9 June 2012 18	Machida Zelvia	0 - 2	Thespa Kusatsu	Machida Municipal Athletic Stadium
Saturday		Summary	Mikuriya 20'; Seong-Yong 76'	Attendance: 2,060

13 June 2012 19	Fagiano Okayama	2 - 1	Machida Zelvia	Momotaro Stadium
Wednesday	Kawamata 39'; Kim Min-Kyun 41'	Summary	Hiramoto 19'	Attendance: 5,916

17 June 2012 20	Machida Zelvia	0 - 0	Montedio Yamagata	Machida Municipal Athletic Stadium
Sunday		Summary		Attendance: 3,225

24 June 2012 21	Gifu	1 - 0	Machida Zelvia	Nagaragawa Stadium
Sunday	Sato 54'	Summary		Attendance: 3,670

1 July 2012 22	Machida Zelvia	0 - 4	Yokohama F.C.	Machida Municipal Athletic Stadium
Sunday		Summary	Kaio 27'; Sato 45+1'; Onose 67', 85'	Attendance: 3,261

8 July 2012 23	Machida Zelvia	0 - 1	Ventforet Kofu	Machida Municipal Athletic Stadium
Sunday		Report	Davi 16'; Yamamoto (yellow card) 38'; Izawa (yellow card) 44'	Attendance: 4,525; Referee: (Japan) Masuya Ueda

15 July 2012 24	Tochigi S.C.	1 - 0	Machida Zelvia	Tochigi Green Stadium
19:00 JST	Sabia (yellow card) 45'; Suzuki (yellow card) 56'; Hirose 80'	Report		Attendance: 4,368; Referee: (Japan) Taku Nagaya

22 July 2012 25	Thespa Kusatsu	1 - 1	Machida Zelvia	Shoda Shoyu Stadium Gunma
Sunday 20:00	Satoru Hoshino (yellow card) 11'; Lincoln 88' (pen.)	Report	Miki 57'	Attendance: 6,868; Referee: (Japan) Tomohiro Inoue

29 July 2012 26	Machida Zelvia	1 - 2	Kyoto Sanga	Machida Municipal Athletic Stadium
Sunday	Kitai 88'	Summary	Miyayoshi 45'; Nakamura 53'	Attendance: 2,822; Referee: (Japan) Kazuyoshi Enomoto

5 August 2012 27	Giravanz Kitakyushu	1 - 1	Machida Zelvia	Honjō Athletic Stadium
Sunday	Komorida (yellow card) 29' (yellow-red card) 64'; Tada 83'	Summary	Suzuki 2'	Attendance: 2,384

12 August 2012 28	JEF United Chiba	0 - 1	Machida Zelvia	Fukuda Denshi Arena
Sunday		Summary	Dimić 50'	Attendance: 9,071

19 August 2012 29	Machida Zelvia	1 - 0	Tokushima Vortis	Machida Municipal Athletic Stadium
Sunday	T.Suzuki 37'	Summary		Attendance: 2,853

22 August 2012 30	Machida Zelvia	0 - 0	Gainare Tottori	Machida Municipal Athletic Stadium
Wednesday		Summary		Attendance: 2,592

26 August 2012 31	Montedio Yamagata	3 - 1	Machida Zelvia	ND Soft Stadium Yamagata
Sunday	Akiba 20'; Hayashi 41'; Nakashima 45+5'	Summary	Kitai 90+1'	Attendance: 6,514

2 September 2012 32	Machida Zelvia	2 - 2	Fagiano Okayama	Machida Municipal Athletic Stadium
Sunday	Ota 55'; Katsumata 61'	Summary	Min-Kyun 19', 86'	Attendance: 2,170

14 September 2012 33	Matsumoto Yamaga	3 - 0	Machida Zelvia	Matsumotodaira Football Stadium
Friday	Iio 24'; Shiozawa 65'; Komatsu 74'	Summary		Attendance: 7,207

17 September 2012 34	Avispa Fukuoka	1 - 1	Machida Zelvia	Level-5 Stadium
Monday	Osmar 14'	Summary	Dimić 26'	Attendance: 3,092

23 September 2012 35	Machida Zelvia	3 - 2	Kataller Toyama	Machida Municipal Athletic Stadium
Sunday	13' (o.g.); Lee Gang-Jin 45'; Ota 84'	Summary	Kato 5'; Nishikawa 90+4'	Attendance: 1,860

30 September 2012 36	Machida Zelvia	1 - 3	Oita Trinita	Machida Municipal Athletic Stadium
Sunday	Kono 32'	Summary	Kijima 14'; Tameda 45+1'; Ishigami 72'	Attendance: 2,859

7 October 2012 37	Tokyo Verdy	1 - 1	Machida Zelvia	Ajinomoto Stadium
Sunday	Kajikawa 50'	Summary	Dimić 85' (pen.)	Attendance: 8,645; Referee: Nobutsugu Murakami

14 October 2012 38	Roasso Kumamoto	2 - 1	Machida Zelvia	Kumamoto Athletics Stadium
Sunday 19:00	Taketomi 12'; Fujimoto (yellow card) 57'; Yano 70'; Harada (yellow card) 80'	Summary	Dimić (yellow card) 38'; Hiramoto 55' (yellow card) 90+4'; Kitai (yellow card) 62'; Kohei Shimoda (yellow card) 66'	Attendance: 7,127; Referee: Haruki Hidaka

21 October 2012 39	Machida Zelvia	2 - 4	Ehime F.C.	Machida Municipal Athletic Stadium
Sunday 17:00	Ota 18', 75'; Hiramoto (yellow card) 86' (yellow-red card) 90+1'	Summary	Kato 4', 59'; Arita 13'; Ito 85'	Attendance: 2,883; Referee: Takuto Okabe

28 October 2012 40	Machida Zelvia	1 - 0	F.C. Gifu	Machida Municipal Athletic Stadium
Sunday 13:00	Dimić 46'; Miki (yellow card) 43' (yellow-red card) 76'	Summary		Attendance: 2,618; Referee: Kenji Ogiya

4 November 2012 41	Mito HollyHock	1 - 1	Machida Zelvia	K's denki Stadium Mito
Sunday 13:00	Suzuki 59'	Summary	Kitai 42'	Attendance: 6,920; Referee: Eiji Kawai

11 November 2012 42	Machida Zelvia	0 - 3	Shonan Bellmare	Machida Municipal Athletic Stadium
Sunday 13:00		Summary	Thiago Quirino 2'; K.Takayama 44'; S.Otsuki 67'	Attendance: 7,139; Referee: Jumpei Iida

==== League table ====
Pos	Team	Pld	W	D	L	GF	GA	GD	Pts	Promotion or relegation
18	Avispa Fukuoka	42	9	14	19	53	68	−15	41	
19	Kataller Toyama	42	9	11	22	38	59	−21	38	
20	Gainare Tottori	42	11	5	26	33	78	−45	38	
21	FC Gifu	42	7	14	21	27	55	−28	35	
22	Machida Zelvia (R)	42	7	11	24	34	67	−33	32	Relegation to 2013 Japan Football League (Note: The promotion and relegation between J2 and JFL will take place only if more than one promotion-eligible (i.e. having a J.League Associate Membership) JFL team finished above second place and playoff will be played only if a eligible JFL team finished in second place (See the corresponding section for further details). As only 2012 Japan Football League Champion V-Varen Nagasaki has the Associate Membership among the top 2 teams. Machida Zelvia was relegated immediately but no relegation/playoff was taken place for FC Gifu which finished 21st.)

Updated to match(es) played on 11 November 2012. Source: J.League Division 2
Rules for classification: 1st points; 2nd goal differential; 3rd goals scored; 4th head-to-head results; 5th disciplinary points; 6th draw. If two clubs are tied for first place, both clubs will be declared champions.
(R) Relegated

=== Emperor's Cup ===
9 September 2012 Second Round	Machida Zelvia	1 – 1 (a.e.t.) (5 - 4 p)	Giravanz Kitakyushu	Komazawa Olympic Park Stadium, Setagaya
13:00	Kitai 22'	report	Tokiwa 51'	Attendance: 1,653; Referee: Shoichiro Mikami
	Penalties
	Katsumata (penalty scored); Suzuki (penalty scored); Kitai (penalty scored); Tsuda (penalty scored); Tashiro (penalty scored)		(penalty scored) Ikemoto; (penalty scored) Hanato; (penalty scored) Kimura; (penalty scored) no.29 (penalty missed) Tokiwa

10 October 2012 Third Round	F.C. Imabari	2 – 5	Machida Zelvia	Hiroshima Big Arch, Hiroshima
19:00	Takanori Kitabayashi 44'; Okamoto 71'	Report	Ota 36', 70'; Kitai 47', 65'; Dimić 90+4'	Attendance: 304

15 December 2012 Fourth Round	Gamba Osaka	3 – 2	Machida Zelvia	Machida Athletic Stadium, Machida, Tokyo
20:00	Kurata 38'; Iwashita 65'; Endo 80'	Report	Kitai 27'; Suzuki 56'	Attendance: 4,576

== Squad statistics ==
=== Appearances and goals ===
As of 11 November 2012

No.	Pos	Nat	Player	Total		J. League 2		Emperor's Cup	
No.	Pos	Nat	Player	Apps	Goals	Apps	Goals	Apps	Goals
1	GK	(Japan) JPN	Tomohito Shugyo	34	0	33+0	0	1+0	0
2	DF	(Japan) JPN	Kazuki Tsuda	23	0	19+2	0	1+1	0
3	DF	(Japan) JPN	Taisei Fujita	38	0	37+0	0	1+0	0
4	MF	(Japan) JPN	Kazuyuki Toda	2	0	0+2	0	0+0	0
5	DF	(Japan) JPN	Masakazu Tashiro	35	0	33+0	0	2+0	0
6	DF	(Japan) JPN	Kosuke Ota	39	6	36+1	4	2+0	2
7	FW	(Japan) JPN	Yoshinori Katsumata	27	3	12+13	3	1+1	0
8	MF	(Japan) JPN	Takumi Ogawa	1	0	0+1	0	0+0	0
10	FW	(Serbia) SRB	Dragan Dimić	34	5	22+10	4	2+0	1
11	MF	(Japan) JPN	Ryo Sakai	3	0	1+2	0	0+0	0
13	DF	(Japan) JPN	Ryuto Otake	6	0	0+6	0	0+0	0
14	DF	(Japan) JPN	Jun Sonoda	24	0	15+7	0	2+0	0
15	MF	(Japan) JPN	Shohei Yanagizaki	19	0	11+8	0	0+0	0
16	MF	(Japan) JPN	Yoshihiro Shoji	26	0	19+7	0	0+0	0
17	MF	(Japan) JPN	Takafumi Suzuki	39	7	34+3	7	2+0	0
18	DF	(Japan) JPN	Kai Miki	34	1	31+2	1	1+0	0
19	MF	(Japan) JPN	Yuki Kitai	39	7	21+16	4	2+0	3
20	FW	(Japan) JPN	Koji Suzuki	17	0	10+7	0	0+0	0
21	GK	(Japan) JPN	Takashi Aizawa	10	0	8+1	0	1+0	0
24	DF	(Japan) JPN	Katsuya Senzaki	1	0	0+1	0	0+0	0
25	FW	(Japan) JPN	Kazuki Hiramoto	37	6	32+4	6	0+1	0
26	MF	(Scotland) SCO	Colin Marshall	27	0	24+2	0	0+1	0
27	MF	(Japan) JPN	Kohei Kato	29	0	24+3	0	2+0	0
28	MF	(Japan) JPN	Kohei Shimoda	17	1	14+2	1	1+0	0
29	DF	(South Korea) KOR	Lee Gang-Jin	11	1	10+0	1	0+1	0
33	MF	(Japan) JPN	Shuto Kono	78	2	7+71	1+1	0	
Players who appeared for Machida Zelvia no longer at the club:

=== Top scorers ===
Place	Position	Nation	Number	Name	J-League 2	Emperor's Cup	Total
1	MF	(Japan)	17	Takafumi Suzuki	7	0	7
1	MF	(Japan)	19	Yuki Kitai	4	3	7
2	FW	(Japan)	25	Kazuki Hiramoto	6	0	6
2	DF	(Japan)	6	Kosuke Ota	4	2	6
5	FW	(Serbia)	10	Dragan Dimić	4	1	5
6	FW	(Japan)	7	Yoshinori Katsumata	3	0	3
7	MF	(Japan)	19	Yuki Kitai	2	0	2
8	MF	(Japan)	28	Kohei Shimoda	1	0	1
8	DF	(Japan)	18	Kai Miki	1	0	1
8	DF	(South Korea)	29	Lee Gang-Jin	1	0	1
8	MF	(Japan)	33	Shuto Kono	1	0	1
8				Own goal	1	0	1
				TOTALS	31	6	37

=== Disciplinary record ===
Number	Nation	Position	Name	J-League 2		Emperor's Cup		Total	
Number	Nation	Position	Name	Yellow card	Red card	Yellow card	Red card	Yellow card	Red card
1	(Japan)	GK	Tomohito Shugyo	3	0	0	0	3	0
2	(Japan)	DF	Kazuki Tsuda	5	1	0	0	5	1
3	(Japan)	DF	Taisei Fujita	6	0	0	0	6	0
5	(Japan)	DF	Masakazu Tashiro	7	0	0	0	7	0
6	(Japan)	DF	Kosuke Ota	9	0	1	0	10	0
10	(Serbia)	FW	Dragan Dimić	3	0	0	0	3	0
14	(Japan)	DF	Jun Sonoda	2	0	2	1	4	1
16	(Japan)	MF	Yoshihiro Shoji	1	0	0	0	1	0
17	(Japan)	MF	Takafumi Suzuki	3	0	1	0	4	0
18	(Japan)	DF	Kai Miki	2	1	1	0	3	1
19	(Japan)	MF	Yuki Kitai	4	0	0	0	4	0
25	(Japan)	FW	Kazuki Hiramoto	6	1	0	0	6	1
26	(Scotland)	MF	Colin Marshall	5	0	1	0	6	0
27	(Japan)	MF	Kohei Kato	3	0	1	0	4	0
28	(Japan)	MF	Kohei Shimoda	3	0	0	0	3	0
29	(South Korea)	DF	Lee Gang-Jin	2	0	0	0	2	0
33	(Japan)	MF	Shuto Kono	1	0	1	0	2	0
			TOTALS	65	3	8	1	73	4
