= Takashi Aizawa =

Japanese footballer (born 1982)

Takashi Aizawa 相澤 貴志
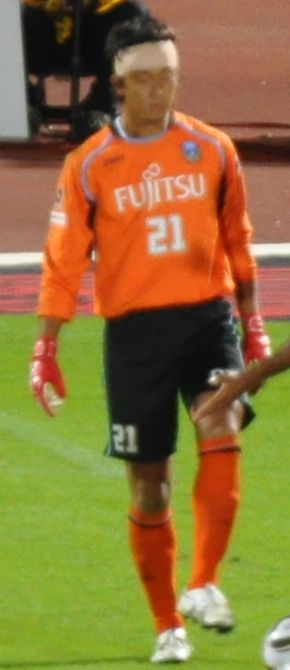

Personal information
- Full name: Takashi Aizawa
- Date of birth: January 5, 1982 (age 44)
- Place of birth: Niigata, Japan
- Height: 1.90 m (6 ft 3 in)
- Position: Goalkeeper

Youth career
- 1997–1999: Niigata Konan High School

Senior career*
Years	Team	Apps	(Gls)
2000–2011	Kawasaki Frontale	95	(0)
2008	→Cerezo Osaka (loan)	26	(0)
2012–2013	FC Machida Zelvia	40	(0)
2014	Shimizu S-Pulse	5	(0)
2015–2017	Tokushima Vortis	17	(0)
Total		183	(0)
Medal record
Kawasaki Frontale
Runner-up	J1 League	2006
Runner-up	J1 League	2009
Runner-up	J.League Cup	2000
Runner-up	J.League Cup	2007
Runner-up	J.League Cup	2009
- * Club domestic league appearances and goals

Takashi Aizawa (相澤 貴志, Aizawa Takashi; born January 5, 1982) is a former Japanese football player.

== Playing career ==
Aizawa was born in Niigata on January 5, 1982. After graduating from high school, he joined newly was promoted to J1 League club, Kawasaki Frontale in 2000. However he could not play at all in the match in 2000 and the club was relegated to J2 League from 2001. Although he played many matches in summer 2001, he could hardly play in the match behind Takeshi Urakami and Shinya Yoshihara until 2004. The club won the champions in 2004 and was promoted to J1 from 2005. From 2005, he battles with Yoshihara for the position and became a regular goalkeeper in July 2005. However he lost regular position behind Yoshihara in September 2006 and he could hardly play in the match behind new member Eiji Kawashima in 2007. In 2008, he moved to J2 club Cerezo Osaka on loan. He battles with Hiromasa Yamamoto for the position and played many matches. In 2009, he returned to Kawasaki Frontale. Although he could not play at all in the match behind Kawashima until May 2010, he became a regular goalkeeper from July instead Kawashima moved to Belgium. However he lost regular position behind Rikihiro Sugiyama in September 2011. In 2012, he moved to J2 club FC Machida Zelvia. Although he player regular player until April 2012, he could hardly play in the match behind Tomohito Shugyo from April and the club was relegated to Japan Football League from 2013. In 2013, he played many matches as regular goalkeeper. In 2014, he moved to J1 club Shimizu S-Pulse. However he could hardly play in the match behind Masatoshi Kushibiki. In 2015, he moved to J2 club Tokushima Vortis. However he could not play many matches behind Toru Hasegawa and Yuji Kajikawa. He retired end of 2017 season.

== Club statistics ==
Club performance			League		Cup		League Cup		Continental		Total	
Season	Club	League	Apps	Goals	Apps	Goals	Apps	Goals	Apps	Goals	Apps	Goals
Japan			League		Emperor's Cup		League Cup		Asia		Total	
2000	Kawasaki Frontale	J1 League	0	0	0	0	0	0	-		0	0
2001	Kawasaki Frontale	J2 League	9	0	0	0	0	0	-		9	0
2002	Kawasaki Frontale	J2 League	0	0	0	0	-		-		0	0
2003	Kawasaki Frontale	J2 League	0	0	0	0	-		-		0	0
2004	Kawasaki Frontale	J2 League	0	0	0	0	-		-		0	0
2005	Kawasaki Frontale	J1 League	22	0	3	0	2	0	-		27	0
2006	Kawasaki Frontale	J1 League	24	0	0	0	9	0	-		33	0
2007	Kawasaki Frontale	J1 League	0	0	0	0	2	0	1	0	3	0
2008	Cerezo Osaka	J2 League	26	0	0	0	-		-		26	0
2009	Kawasaki Frontale	J1 League	0	0	0	0	0	0	0	0	0	0
2010	Kawasaki Frontale	J1 League	23	0	3	0	4	0	0	0	30	0
2011	Kawasaki Frontale	J1 League	17	0	0	0	1	0	–		18	0
2012	FC Machida Zelvia	J2 League	9	0	1	0	–		–		10	0
2013	FC Machida Zelvia	Football League	31	0	0	0	–		–		31	0
2014	Shimizu S-Pulse	J1 League	5	0	1	0	1	0	–		7	0
2015	Tokushima Vortis	J2 League	5	0	0	0	–		–		5	0
2016	Tokushima Vortis	J2 League	12	0	2	0	–		–		14	0
2017	Tokushima Vortis	J2 League	0	0	0	0	–		–		0	0
Career total			183	0	10	0	19	0	1	0	213	0
