= Takeshi Hamada =

Japanese footballer

Takeshi Hamada 濱田 武
Personal information
- Full name: Takeshi Hamada
- Date of birth: 21 December 1982 (age 43)
- Place of birth: Osaka, Japan
- Height: 1.75 m (5 ft 9 in)
- Position: Midfielder

Youth career
- 1998–2000: Cerezo Osaka

Senior career*
Years	Team	Apps	(Gls)
2001–2009	Cerezo Osaka	135	(3)
2005–2006	→Sagan Tosu (loan)	53	(5)
2010–2017	Tokushima Vortis	216	(7)
Total		404	(15)
Medal record
Cerezo Osaka
Runner-up	Emperor's Cup	2001
Runner-up	Emperor's Cup	2003
- * Club domestic league appearances and goals

Takeshi Hamada (濱田 武, Hamada Takeshi; born 21 December 1982) is a former Japanese football player.

== Playing career ==
Kamada was born in Osaka on 21 December 1982. He joined J1 League club Cerezo Osaka from youth team in 2001. He could not play at all in the match in J1 League and Cerezo was relegated to J2 League end of 2001 season. He debuted in 2001 Emperor's Cup in December and Cerezo won the 2nd place. In 2002, he played many matches as defensive midfielder and Cerezo was returned to J1 in a year. Although he became a regular player, he played many matches from 2003 and won the 2nd place 2003 Emperor's Cup. However he could hardly play in the match in 2005. In September 2005, he moved to J2 club Sagan Tosu on loan. He became a regular player soon and played many matches until 2006. In 2007, he returned to Cerezo which was relegated to J2 from 2007. He played many matches and Cerezo was promoted to J1 end of 2009 season. However he moved to J2 club Tokushima Vortis in 2010. He played as regular player and Vortis was promoted to J1 end of 2013 season first time in the club history. However Vortis finished at the bottom place in 2014 season and was relegated to J2 in a year. His opportunity to play decreased from 2016 season and he retired end of 2017 season.

== Club statistics ==
Club performance			League		Cup		League Cup		Total	
Season	Club	League	Apps	Goals	Apps	Goals	Apps	Goals	Apps	Goals
Japan			League		Emperor's Cup		J.League Cup		Total	
2001	Cerezo Osaka	J1 League	0	0	5	0	0	0	5	0
2002	Cerezo Osaka	J2 League	14	0	1	0	-		15	0
2003	Cerezo Osaka	J1 League	13	0	3	1	1	0	17	1
2004	Cerezo Osaka	J1 League	18	1	1	0	3	0	22	1
2005	Cerezo Osaka	J1 League	1	0	0	0	0	0	1	0
Total			46	1	9	1	4	0	59	2
2005	Sagan Tosu	J2 League	12	1	2	0	-		14	1
2006	Sagan Tosu	J2 League	41	4	1	0	-		42	4
Total			53	5	3	0	-		56	5
2007	Cerezo Osaka	J2 League	36	0	2	0	-		38	0
2008	Cerezo Osaka	J2 League	19	0	2	0	-		21	0
2009	Cerezo Osaka	J2 League	34	2	0	0	-		34	2
Total			89	2	4	0	-		93	2
2010	Tokushima Vortis	J2 League	32	3	2	0	-		34	3
2011	Tokushima Vortis	J2 League	22	0	1	0	-		23	0
2012	Tokushima Vortis	J2 League	29	1	2	1	-		31	2
2013	Tokushima Vortis	J2 League	39	1	1	0	-		40	1
2014	Tokushima Vortis	J1 League	33	0	1	0	3	1	37	1
2015	Tokushima Vortis	J2 League	40	2	3	0	-		43	2
2016	Tokushima Vortis	J2 League	16	0	2	0	-		18	0
2017	Tokushima Vortis	J2 League	5	0	1	0	-		6	0
Total			216	7	13	1	3	1	232	9
Career total			404	15	30	2	7	1	441	18
