= Ryuto Otake =

Japanese footballer (born 1988)

Ryuto Otake 大竹 隆人
Personal information
- Full name: Ryuto Otake
- Date of birth: June 29, 1988 (age 38)
- Place of birth: Meguro, Tokyo, Japan
- Height: 1.71 m (5 ft 7 1/2 in)
- Position: Defender

Team information
- Current team: J.FC Miyazaki
- Number: 7

Youth career
- 2001–2006: Mitsubishi Yowa

College career
Years	Team	Apps	(Gls)
2007–2010	Kokushikan University		

Senior career*
Years	Team	Apps	(Gls)
2011–2016	Machida Zelvia	88	(5)
2017–2019	Fujieda MYFC	81	(7)
2020–	J.FC Miyazaki		
- * Club domestic league appearances and goals as of 1 January 2020

Ryuto Otake (大竹 隆人, Ōtake Ryūto; born June 29, 1988) is a Japanese football player for J.FC Miyazaki.

== Club statistics ==
Updated to 1 January 2020.

Club performance			League		Cup		Total	
Season	Club	League	Apps	Goals	Apps	Goals	Apps	Goals
Japan			League		Emperor's Cup		Total	
2011	Machida Zelvia	JFL	6	0	0	0	6	0
2012	Machida Zelvia	J2 League	6	0	0	0	6	0
2013	Machida Zelvia	JFL	28	4	-		28	4
2014	Machida Zelvia	J3 League	25	1	-		25	1
2015	Machida Zelvia	J3 League	17	0	1	0	18	0
2016	Machida Zelvia	J2 League	6	0	1	0	7	0
2017	Fujieda MYFC	J3 League	28	3	-		28	3
2018	Fujieda MYFC	J3 League	29	3	-		29	3
2019	Fujieda MYFC	J3 League	24	1	-		24	1
Total			169	12	2	0	171	12
