= Taisei Fujita =

Japanese footballer

Taisei Fujita 藤田 泰成
Personal information
- Full name: Taisei Fujita
- Date of birth: January 31, 1982 (age 44)
- Place of birth: Kuroshio, Kochi, Japan
- Height: 1.73 m (5 ft 8 in)
- Positions: Midfielder; defender

Youth career
- 1997–1999: Tatara Gakuen High School

Senior career*
Years	Team	Apps	(Gls)
2000–2004	Nagoya Grampus Eight	19	(1)
2005	FC Tokyo	0	(0)
2006–2007	Tokyo Verdy	36	(0)
2008–2009	Tokushima Vortis	52	(1)
2010–2014	FC Machida Zelvia	132	(2)
Total		239	(4)
- * Club domestic league appearances and goals

Taisei Fujita (藤田 泰成, Fujita Taisei; born January 31, 1982) is a former Japanese football player.

== Playing career ==
Fujita was born in Kuroshio, Kochi on January 31, 1982. After graduating from high school, he joined J1 League club Nagoya Grampus Eight in 2000. He played many matches as right and left side back in the first season. From 2001-2004 he seldom played in matches. In 2005, he moved to FC Tokyo. Although he played as right side back in all matches in J.League Cup, he could not play at all in league competition. In 2006, he moved to J2 League club Tokyo Verdy. He played many matches as right and left side back in 2006. However he could not play many matches in 2007. In 2008, he moved to J2 club Tokushima Vortis and became a regular player as left side back. However his opportunity to play decreased in 2009. In 2010, he moved to Japan Football League (JFL) club FC Machida Zelvia. He became a regular player and the club was promoted to J2 from 2012. Although the club was relegated to JFL in 2013, the club was promoted to the new J3 League in 2014. However he did not play in many matches, and retired at the end of the 2014 season.

== Club statistics ==
Club performance			League		Cup		League Cup		Continental		Total	
Season	Club	League	Apps	Goals	Apps	Goals	Apps	Goals	Apps	Goals	Apps	Goals
Japan			League		Emperor's Cup		J.League Cup		Asia		Total	
2000	Nagoya Grampus Eight	J1 League	10	1	0	0	1	0	-		11	1
2001	Nagoya Grampus Eight	J1 League	3	0	0	0	0	0	-		3	0
2002	Nagoya Grampus Eight	J1 League	0	0	3	0	1	0	-		4	0
2003	Nagoya Grampus Eight	J1 League	0	0	0	0	0	0	-		0	0
2004	Nagoya Grampus Eight	J1 League	6	0	1	0	1	0	-		8	0
2005	FC Tokyo	J1 League	0	0	0	0	6	0	-		6	0
2006	Tokyo Verdy	J2 League	26	0	0	0	-		2	0	28	0
2007	Tokyo Verdy	J2 League	10	0	1	0	-		-		11	0
2008	Tokushima Vortis	J2 League	37	0	1	0	-		-		38	0
2009	Tokushima Vortis	J2 League	15	1	0	0	-		-		15	1
2010	FC Machida Zelvia	Football League	32	0	2	0	-		-		34	0
2011	FC Machida Zelvia	Football League	30	0	2	0	-		-		32	0
2012	FC Machida Zelvia	J2 League	38	0	1	0	-		-		39	0
2013	FC Machida Zelvia	Football League	30	2	-		-		-		30	2
2014	FC Machida Zelvia	J3 League	2	0	-		-		-		2	0
Total			239	4	11	0	9	0	2	0	261	4
