= Kosuke Ota (footballer, born 1982) =

Japanese footballer

Kosuke Ota 太田 康介
Personal information
- Full name: Kosuke Ota
- Date of birth: 26 October 1982 (age 44)
- Place of birth: Urawa, Saitama, Japan
- Height: 1.75 m (5 ft 9 in)
- Position: Defender

Senior career*
Years	Team	Apps	(Gls)
2005	Saitama SC	14	(4)
2006	Thespa Kusatsu; Reserves	0	(0)
2007–2009	Yokogawa Musashino	97	(18)
2010–2013	Machida Zelvia	115	(11)
2014–2017	Zweigen Kanazawa	138	(13)
2018–2019	FC Imabari	46	(1)
2020	ReinMeer Aomori	15	(2)
- * Club domestic league appearances and goals as of 12 January 2021, 11:00 (UTC)

Kosuke Ota (太田 康介, Ota Kosuke; born October 26, 1982) is a Japanese former football player who plays as defender and midfielder.

== Club statistics ==
Updated to the end of 2020 season.

Club performance			League		Cup		Total	
Season	Club	League	Apps	Goals	Apps	Goals	Apps	Goals
Japan			League		Emperor's Cup		Total	
2005	Saitama SC	JLR (Kantō, Div. 1)	14	4	1	0	15	4
2007	Yokogawa Musashino	JFL	34	7	–		34	7
2008	Yokogawa Musashino	JFL	31	7	–		31	7
2009	Yokogawa Musashino	JFL	32	4	1	0	33	4
2010	Machida Zelvia	JFL	29	2	2	1	31	3
2011	Machida Zelvia	JFL	31	2	2	1	33	3
2012	Machida Zelvia	J2 League	38	4	3	2	41	6
2013	Machida Zelvia	JFL	17	3	–		17	3
2014	Zweigen Kanazawa	J3 League	33	7	2	0	35	7
2015	Zweigen Kanazawa	J2 League	39	3	1	0	40	3
2016	Zweigen Kanazawa	J2 League	37	3	0	0	37	3
2017	Zweigen Kanazawa	J2 League	29	0	1	0	30	0
2018	FC Imabari	JFL	30	1	1	0	31	1
2019	FC Imabari	JFL	16	0	–		16	0
2020	ReinMeer Aomori	JFL	15	2	1	0	16	2
Total			424	49	15	4	439	53
