= Hashimura =

Hashimura (written: 橋村, lit. "bridge village") is a Japanese surname. Notable people with the surname include:

- Ryujoseph Hashimura (橋村 龍ジョセフ, born 2000), Japanese footballer
- Yuta Hashimura (橋村 祐太, born 1991), Japanese footballer
