= Weslley (footballer, born January 1992) =

Brazilian footballer

Personal information
- Full name: Weslley Silva Santos Rodrigues
- Date of birth: January 16, 1992 (age 34)
- Place of birth: Salvador, Bahia, Brazil
- Height: 1.84 m (6 ft 1/2 in)
- Position: Defender

Team information
- Current team: Kagoshima United FC
- Number: 3

Youth career
- 2008–2011: Cruzeiro

Senior career*
Years	Team	Apps	(Gls)
2013	Sertãozinho	2	(0)
2013–2014	SC Sagamihara	32	(6)
2015–2016	Tokyo Verdy	23	(0)
2017	Anápolis	2	(0)
2018	Jequié	8	(2)
2018	Galícia		
2019	Iwaki		
2021–	Kagoshima United	31	(2)
- * Club domestic league appearances and goals as of 17:27, 13 September 2023

Weslley Silva Santos Rodrigues (born January 16, 1992) is a Brazilian football player for Kagoshima United.

== Career ==
Weslley made his debut for Kagoshima on 14 March 2021, playing the full 90 minutes against Gainare Tottori.

== Club statistics ==
Updated to 23 February 2017.

Club performance			League		Cup		Total	
Season	Club	League	Apps	Goals	Apps	Goals	Apps	Goals
Japan			League		Emperor's Cup		Total	
2013	SC Sagamihara	JFL	10	2	–		10	2
2014	SC Sagamihara	J3 League	22	4	–		22	4
2015	Tokyo Verdy	J2 League	10	0	1	0	11	0
2016	Tokyo Verdy	J2 League	13	0	0	0	13	0
Career total			55	6	1	0	56	6
