= Kai Miki =

Japanese footballer

Kai Miki 三鬼 海
Personal information
- Full name: Kai Miki
- Date of birth: 19 April 1993 (age 33)
- Place of birth: Kuwana, Mie, Japan
- Height: 1.74 m (5 ft 8 1/2 in)
- Position: Defender

Team information
- Current team: SC Sagamihara
- Number: 18

Youth career
- –2010: Nagoya Grampus

Senior career*
Years	Team	Apps	(Gls)
2011–2016	FC Machida Zelvia	104	(1)
2015	→ V-Varen Nagasaki (loan)	27	(0)
2017	Roasso Kumamoto	21	(0)
2018–2020	Montedio Yamagata	73	(1)
2021-2024	FC Machida Zelvia	40	(1)
2024-	SC Sagamihara	29	(0)
- * Club domestic league appearances and goals as of 17 August 2026

Kai Miki (三鬼 海, born 19 April 1993) is a Japanese football player for SC Sagamihara.

== Career statistics ==
=== Club ===
Updated to end of 2018 season.

Club	Season	League		Cup^{1}		Other^{2}		Total	
Club	Season	Apps	Goals	Apps	Goals	Apps	Goals	Apps	Goals
Machida Zelvia	2011	5	0	0	0	-		5	0
Machida Zelvia	2012	34	1	2	0	-		36	1
Machida Zelvia	2013	22	0	-		-		22	0
Machida Zelvia	2014	24	0	-		-		24	0
V-Varen Nagasaki	2015	27	0	-		1	0	28	0
Machida Zelvia	2016	19	0	-		-		19	0
Roasso Kumamoto	2017	21	0	2	0	-		23	0
Montedio Yamagata	2018	32	1	1	0	-		33	1
Total		184	2	5	0	1	0	190	2

^{1}Includes Emperor's Cup.

^{2}Includes J2/J3 Playoffs.
