= 2017 Tokushima Vortis season =

Tokushima Vortis
2017 season
- Manager: Ricardo Rodríguez
- Stadium: Pocarisweat Stadium
- J2 League: 7th

2017 Tokushima Vortis season.

== J2 League ==
=== League table ===
Pos	Team	Pld	W	D	L	GF	GA	GD	Pts	Promotion, qualification or relegation
6	JEF United Chiba	42	20	8	14	70	58	+12	68	Qualification for promotion playoffs (Note: Only teams that meet J1 license criteria can participate in promotion playoffs. If one or more teams fail to meet the criteria, only eligible teams that finished 3rd to 6th will participate and no replacement teams will be added.)
7	Tokushima Vortis	42	18	13	11	71	45	+26	67	
8	Matsumoto Yamaga	42	19	9	14	61	45	+16	66	

Updated to match(es) played on 28 November 2017. Source: 2017 MEIJI YASUDA J2 LEAGUE League table
Rules for classification: 1) Points; 2) Goal difference; 3) Goals scored

=== Match details ===
J2 League match details
Match	Date	Team	Score	Team	Venue	Attendance
1	2017.02.26	Tokushima Vortis	1-0	Tokyo Verdy	Pocarisweat Stadium	6,149
2	2017.03.04	Kyoto Sanga FC	1-0	Tokushima Vortis	Kyoto Nishikyogoku Athletic Stadium	5,948
3	2017.03.12	Tokushima Vortis	3-1	V-Varen Nagasaki	Pocarisweat Stadium	4,777
4	2017.03.18	Oita Trinita	0-1	Tokushima Vortis	Oita Bank Dome	7,150
5	2017.03.25	Yokohama FC	0-2	Tokushima Vortis	NHK Spring Mitsuzawa Football Stadium	4,124
6	2017.04.01	Tokushima Vortis	0-2	Matsumoto Yamaga FC	Pocarisweat Stadium	4,782
7	2017.04.08	Renofa Yamaguchi FC	1-1	Tokushima Vortis	Ishin Memorial Park Stadium	4,013
8	2017.04.15	Tokushima Vortis	2-2	Nagoya Grampus	Pocarisweat Stadium	6,078
9	2017.04.22	FC Machida Zelvia	0-1	Tokushima Vortis	Machida Stadium	2,710
10	2017.04.29	JEF United Chiba	2-0	Tokushima Vortis	Fukuda Denshi Arena	9,077
11	2017.05.03	Tokushima Vortis	2-1	Avispa Fukuoka	Pocarisweat Stadium	5,832
12	2017.05.07	Fagiano Okayama	3-2	Tokushima Vortis	City Light Stadium	8,931
13	2017.05.13	Tokushima Vortis	1-1	FC Gifu	Pocarisweat Stadium	3,762
14	2017.05.17	Tokushima Vortis	1-1	Zweigen Kanazawa	Pocarisweat Stadium	3,106
15	2017.05.21	Mito HollyHock	1-1	Tokushima Vortis	K's denki Stadium Mito	4,307
16	2017.05.27	Tokushima Vortis	1-1	Kamatamare Sanuki	Pocarisweat Stadium	5,409
17	2017.06.03	Thespakusatsu Gunma	0-2	Tokushima Vortis	Shoda Shoyu Stadium Gunma	4,186
18	2017.06.10	Tokushima Vortis	0-1	Shonan Bellmare	Pocarisweat Stadium	4,342
19	2017.06.17	Tokushima Vortis	3-0	Roasso Kumamoto	Pocarisweat Stadium	3,873
20	2017.06.25	Montedio Yamagata	1-6	Tokushima Vortis	ND Soft Stadium Yamagata	5,795
21	2017.07.01	Tokushima Vortis	4-1	Ehime FC	Pocarisweat Stadium	7,583
22	2017.07.08	Nagoya Grampus	0-2	Tokushima Vortis	Toyota Stadium	12,959
23	2017.07.16	Tokushima Vortis	1-1	Kyoto Sanga FC	Pocarisweat Stadium	6,344
24	2017.07.23	Avispa Fukuoka	0-1	Tokushima Vortis	Level5 Stadium	8,063
25	2017.07.29	Shonan Bellmare	2-0	Tokushima Vortis	Shonan BMW Stadium Hiratsuka	7,744
26	2017.08.05	Tokushima Vortis	0-1	JEF United Chiba	Pocarisweat Stadium	4,678
27	2017.08.11	Tokushima Vortis	2-2	Yokohama FC	Pocarisweat Stadium	5,958
28	2017.08.16	Zweigen Kanazawa	0-4	Tokushima Vortis	Ishikawa Athletics Stadium	3,727
29	2017.08.20	Tokushima Vortis	5-0	Renofa Yamaguchi FC	Pocarisweat Stadium	4,430
30	2017.08.26	Tokushima Vortis	1-1	Montedio Yamagata	Pocarisweat Stadium	4,567
31	2017.09.02	Matsumoto Yamaga FC	3-1	Tokushima Vortis	Matsumotodaira Park Stadium	14,661
32	2017.09.10	V-Varen Nagasaki	2-1	Tokushima Vortis	Transcosmos Stadium Nagasaki	4,744
33	2017.09.16	Tokushima Vortis	3-3	Fagiano Okayama	Pocarisweat Stadium	4,203
34	2017.09.23	Tokushima Vortis	2-2	FC Machida Zelvia	Pocarisweat Stadium	3,941
35	2017.10.01	Kamatamare Sanuki	0-0	Tokushima Vortis	Pikara Stadium	6,753
36	2017.10.07	Tokushima Vortis	4-1	Thespakusatsu Gunma	Pocarisweat Stadium	3,860
37	2017.10.14	FC Gifu	0-2	Tokushima Vortis	Gifu Nagaragawa Stadium	5,359
38	2017.10.22	Roasso Kumamoto	1-1	Tokushima Vortis	Egao Kenko Stadium	7,153
39	2017.10.28	Tokushima Vortis	2-3	Mito HollyHock	Pocarisweat Stadium	3,915
40	2017.11.05	Ehime FC	1-3	Tokushima Vortis	Ningineer Stadium	5,203
41	2017.11.11	Tokushima Vortis	1-0	Oita Trinita	Pocarisweat Stadium	6,968
42	2017.11.19	Tokyo Verdy	2-1	Tokushima Vortis	Ajinomoto Stadium	14,541
