= Dragan Dimić =

Serbian footballer

Personal information
- Full name: Dragan Dimić
- Date of birth: October 14, 1981 (age 45)
- Place of birth: Gnjilane, SFR Yugoslavia
- Height: 1.75 m (5 ft 9 in)
- Position: Striker

Senior career*
Years	Team	Apps	(Gls)
2004–2007	ASC Götzendorf	30	(14)
2007–2010	Austria Wien	1	(0)
2007–2010	Austria Wien II	89	(13)
2010	Horn	11	(5)
2011–2012	Machida Zelvia	64	(17)
2013	Wiener SC	15	(5)
2013	SC Wiener Viktoria	13	(1)
2014–2015	Vorwärts Steyr	30	(4)
2015–2021	ASK Mannersdorf	111	(61)
2021–2023	ASC Götzendorf	41	(24)
- * Club domestic league appearances and goals

Dragan Dimić (Serbian Cyrillic: Драган Димић; born October 14, 1981, in Gnjilane, Kosovo) is a Serbian retired football player.
