= Jun Sonoda =

Japanese footballer

Jun Sonoda 薗田 淳
Personal information
- Full name: Jun Sonoda
- Date of birth: 23 January 1989 (age 37)
- Place of birth: Shizuoka, Japan
- Height: 1.82 m (6 ft 0 in)
- Position: Defender

Youth career
- 2004–2006: Tokoha Univ. Tachibana High School

Senior career*
Years	Team	Apps	(Gls)
2007–2013	Kawasaki Frontale	8	(0)
2012	→ Machida Zelvia (loan)	21	(0)
2014–2015	Consadole Sapporo	8	(0)
2016–2017	Roasso Kumamoto	14	(1)
2017	→ Fujieda MYFC (loan)	4	(0)
2018	Blaublitz Akita	1	(0)
Medal record
Kawasaki Frontale
Runner-up	J1 League	2008
Runner-up	J1 League	2009
Runner-up	J.League Cup	2007
Runner-up	J.League Cup	2009
Representing Japan
Asian Games
Gold medal – first place	2010 Guangzhou	Team
- * Club domestic league appearances and goals as of 23 February 2019

Jun Sonoda (薗田 淳, Sonoda Jun; born 23 January 1989) is a former Japanese football player who last played for Blaublitz Akita.

== Career statistics ==
Updated to 23 February 2019.

Club performance			League		Cup		League Cup		Continental		Total	
Season	Club	League	Apps	Goals	Apps	Goals	Apps	Goals	Apps	Goals	Apps	Goals
Japan			League		Emperor's Cup		League Cup		AFC		Total	
2007	Kawasaki Frontale	J1 League	0	0	0	0	0	0	1	0	1	0
2008	Kawasaki Frontale	J1 League	0	0	0	0	0	0	-		0	0
2009	Kawasaki Frontale	J1 League	3	0	1	0	0	0	0	0	4	0
2010	Kawasaki Frontale	J1 League	3	0	1	0	0	0	0	0	4	0
2011	Kawasaki Frontale	J1 League	2	0	0	0	1	0	-		3	0
2012	Machida Zelvia	J2 League	21	0	2	0	-		-		23	0
2013	Kawasaki Frontale	J1 League	0	0	0	0	0	0	-		0	0
2014	Consadole Sapporo	J2 League	8	0	2	1	-		-		10	1
2015	Consadole Sapporo	J2 League	0	0	0	0	-		-		0	0
2016	Roasso Kumamoto	J2 League	14	1	1	0	-		-		15	1
2017	Roasso Kumamoto	J2 League	0	0	0	0	-		-		0	0
2017	Fujieda MYFC	J3 League	4	0	-		-		-		4	0
2018	Blaublitz Akita	J3 League	1	0	0	0	-		-		1	0
Career total			56	1	7	1	1	0	1	0	65	2
