= Yuki Kitai =

Japanese footballer

Yuki Kitai 北井 佑季
Personal information
- Full name: Yuki Kitai
- Date of birth: January 27, 1990 (age 36)
- Place of birth: Yokohama, Kanagawa, Japan
- Height: 1.69 m (5 ft 6 1/2 in)
- Position: Midfielder

Team information
- Current team: SC Sagamihara
- Number: 7

Youth career
- 20062009: Kindai University

Senior career*
Years	Team	Apps	(Gls)
2010–2012	Machida Zelvia	80	(11)
2013–2014	Matsumoto Yamaga	26	(0)
2015–2017	Kataller Toyama	86	(6)
2018	SC Sagamihara		
- * Club domestic league appearances and goals as of 23 February 2018

Yuki Kitai (北井 佑季, Kitai Yūki; born January 27, 1990) was a Japanese former football player belonged to SC Sagamihara. Now, he is a professional track cyclist.

== Club statistics ==
Updated to 23 February 2018.

Club performance			League		Cup		Total	
Season	Club	League	Apps	Goals	Apps	Goals	Apps	Goals
Japan			League		Emperor's Cup		Total	
2010	Machida Zelvia	JFL	12	0	1	0	13	0
2011	Machida Zelvia	JFL	30	6	2	0	32	6
2012	Machida Zelvia	J2 League	38	5	3	4	41	9
2013	Matsumoto Yamaga	J2 League	23	0	0	0	23	0
2014	Matsumoto Yamaga	J2 League	3	0	0	0	3	0
2015	Kataller Toyama	J3 League	35	5	0	0	35	5
2016	Kataller Toyama	J3 League	24	1	1	0	25	1
2017	Kataller Toyama	J3 League	27	0	2	0	29	0
Total			192	17	9	4	201	21
