= Colin Marshall (footballer, born 1984) =

Scottish footballer

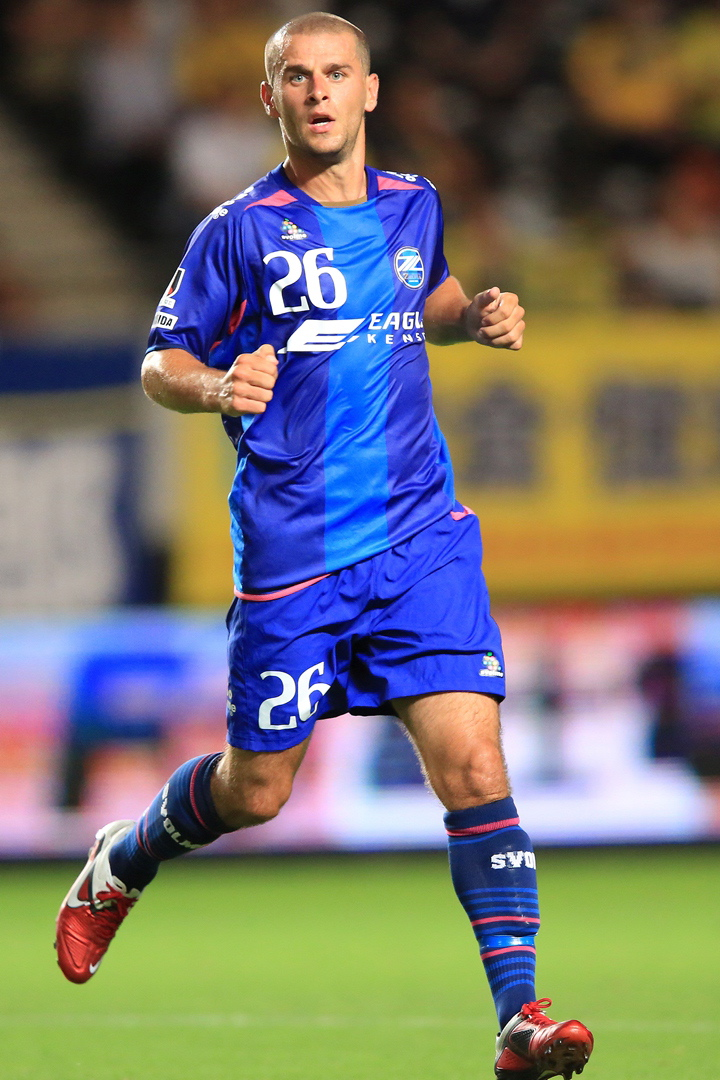

Personal information
- Full name: Colin Jenkins Marshall
- Date of birth: 25 October 1984 (age 42)
- Place of birth: Glasgow, Scotland
- Height: 5 ft 9 in (1.75 m)
- Position: Midfielder

Youth career
- 2000–2002: Aston Villa

Senior career*
Years	Team	Apps	(Gls)
2002–2004	Aston Villa	0	(0)
2003–2004	→ Clyde (loan)	25	(2)
2004	St Johnstone	5	(0)
2004–2005	Falkirk	12	(1)
2005–2006	Stranraer	10	(2)
2006	Dundee	13	(1)
2009–2010	Tiverton Town	35	(4)
2010	Crevillente Deportivo	16	(4)
2011	BÍ/Bolungarvík	14	(2)
2011	Knattspyrnufélagið Víkingur	7	(0)
2012	Machida Zelvia	27	(0)
2014	Amicale		
2014–2015	Cowdenbeath	24	(0)
2016	Amicale		
Total		188	(16)
- * Club domestic league appearances and goals as of 23:23, 28 December 2014 (UTC) ‡ National team caps and goals as of 8 December 2017

Colin Jenkins Marshall (born 25 October 1984) is a Scottish footballer who is a midfielder. Previously Marshall has played professional football in England, Scotland, Spain, Iceland, Japan, and Vanuatu.

== Career ==
Marshall began his career with Aston Villa, for whom he won the FA Youth Cup in 2002. He spent the 2003-04 season on loan at Clyde, signing initially for six months, then extending the deal until the end of the season in January 2004. During his time at Clyde he won the SFL Young Player of the Month award for February 2004.

Looking to play first team football, he moved to St Johnstone in June 2004. After only two months at the club, his contract was terminated by mutual consent on 31 August 2004. One month later, Marshall signed for Falkirk on a short-term contract, which was later extended for the rest of the 2004–05 season. He was released by Falkirk at the end of the season.

In March 2011, Marshall signed for Icelandic club BÍ/Bolungarvík and in August 2011, moved to fellow Icelandic side Knattspyrnufélagið Víkingur.

In March 2012, Marshall signed a contract with J2 League side FC Machida Zelvia. He made 27 league appearances for the club before falling out of favour with manager Ossie Ardiles and leaving the club in late September. In February 2014, Marshall signed for Amicale FC of Vanuatu During his spell in Vanuatu he earned a runners-up medal in the 2013–14 OFC Champions League as Amicale lost 3–2 on aggregate to Auckland City, with Marshall missing a penalty in the second leg.

On 8 September 2014, Marshall returned to Scotland, agreeing a deal with Championship club Cowdenbeath, although the deal was held up as Cowdenbeath couldn't get clearance for him. On 14 October 2014, Cowdenbeath announced the deal for Marshall had been completed. After one season with Cowden, Marshall left the club.

On 16 February 2016 Marshall has returned to Amicale FC.

In January 2017, Marshall joined Gartcairn in the West of Scotland League Central District Second Division, but was subsequently released in March of the same year. Marshall has since gone on to join Drumchapel United amateurs in the Sunday central league.

== Honours ==
Aston Villa

- FA Youth Cup: 2001–02

Clyde

- Scottish First Division Runner Up: 2003–04

Falkirk

- Scottish First Division Winner: 2004–05
