= 2016 Tokushima Vortis season =

Tokushima Vortis
2016 season
- Manager: Hiroaki Nagashima
- Stadium: Pocarisweat Stadium
- J2 League: 9th

2016 Tokushima Vortis season.

== J2 League ==
=== League table ===
Pos	Team	Pld	W	D	L	GF	GA	GD	Pts
8	Yokohama FC	42	16	11	15	50	51	−1	59
9	Tokushima Vortis	42	16	9	17	46	42	+4	57
10	Ehime FC	42	12	20	10	41	40	+1	56

Updated to match(es) played on 20 November 2016. Source: 2016 MEIJI YASUDA J2 LEAGUE League table
Rules for classification: 1) Points; 2) Goal difference; 3) Goals scored

=== Match details ===
J2 League match details
Match	Date	Team	Score	Team	Venue	Attendance
1	2016.02.28	JEF United Chiba	2-1	Tokushima Vortis	Fukuda Denshi Arena	12,063
2	2016.03.06	Tokushima Vortis	0-1	Roasso Kumamoto	Pocarisweat Stadium	4,413
3	2016.03.13	Tokushima Vortis	2-2	Montedio Yamagata	Pocarisweat Stadium	4,358
4	2016.03.20	Tokyo Verdy	1-0	Tokushima Vortis	Ajinomoto Stadium	3,813
5	2016.03.26	Kamatamare Sanuki	1-2	Tokushima Vortis	Pikara Stadium	4,947
6	2016.04.03	Tokushima Vortis	1-3	FC Gifu	Pocarisweat Stadium	3,508
7	2016.04.09	Matsumoto Yamaga FC	1-0	Tokushima Vortis	Matsumotodaira Park Stadium	10,976
8	2016.04.17	Tokushima Vortis	1-1	Renofa Yamaguchi FC	Pocarisweat Stadium	3,380
9	2016.04.23	Kyoto Sanga FC	0-1	Tokushima Vortis	Kyoto Nishikyogoku Athletic Stadium	4,731
10	2016.04.29	Hokkaido Consadole Sapporo	1-0	Tokushima Vortis	Sapporo Dome	14,186
11	2016.05.03	Tokushima Vortis	1-0	Mito HollyHock	Pocarisweat Stadium	3,698
12	2016.05.07	Tokushima Vortis	0-3	Yokohama FC	Pocarisweat Stadium	4,313
13	2016.05.15	Shimizu S-Pulse	0-1	Tokushima Vortis	IAI Stadium Nihondaira	10,469
14	2016.05.22	Tokushima Vortis	1-1	Thespakusatsu Gunma	Pocarisweat Stadium	3,649
15	2016.05.28	Tokushima Vortis	1-0	Giravanz Kitakyushu	Pocarisweat Stadium	3,490
16	2016.06.04	FC Machida Zelvia	1-0	Tokushima Vortis	Machida Stadium	4,021
17	2016.06.08	Tokushima Vortis	2-3	Fagiano Okayama	Pocarisweat Stadium	3,218
18	2016.06.12	Ehime FC	0-2	Tokushima Vortis	Ningineer Stadium	4,460
19	2016.06.19	Cerezo Osaka	3-2	Tokushima Vortis	Kincho Stadium	8,464
20	2016.06.26	Tokushima Vortis	0-1	Zweigen Kanazawa	Pocarisweat Stadium	3,525
21	2016.07.03	Tokushima Vortis	0-0	V-Varen Nagasaki	Pocarisweat Stadium	3,243
22	2016.07.10	Yokohama FC	0-2	Tokushima Vortis	NHK Spring Mitsuzawa Football Stadium	3,034
23	2016.07.16	Tokushima Vortis	2-1	Kyoto Sanga FC	Pocarisweat Stadium	4,191
24	2016.07.20	Roasso Kumamoto	1-0	Tokushima Vortis	Umakana-Yokana Stadium	3,701
25	2016.07.24	Tokushima Vortis	2-0	Ehime FC	Pocarisweat Stadium	8,962
26	2016.07.31	Tokushima Vortis	2-2	Matsumoto Yamaga FC	Pocarisweat Stadium	4,642
27	2016.08.07	Fagiano Okayama	1-0	Tokushima Vortis	City Light Stadium	10,443
28	2016.08.11	Tokushima Vortis	1-1	FC Machida Zelvia	Pocarisweat Stadium	3,703
29	2016.08.14	FC Gifu	1-1	Tokushima Vortis	Gifu Nagaragawa Stadium	4,109
30	2016.08.21	Tokushima Vortis	3-1	Tokyo Verdy	Pocarisweat Stadium	3,618
31	2016.09.11	Giravanz Kitakyushu	0-1	Tokushima Vortis	Honjo Stadium	2,654
32	2016.09.18	Montedio Yamagata	2-1	Tokushima Vortis	ND Soft Stadium Yamagata	4,772
33	2016.09.25	Tokushima Vortis	0-1	Cerezo Osaka	Pocarisweat Stadium	7,657
34	2016.10.02	V-Varen Nagasaki	1-2	Tokushima Vortis	Transcosmos Stadium Nagasaki	3,687
35	2016.10.08	Tokushima Vortis	0-0	Kamatamare Sanuki	Pocarisweat Stadium	4,177
36	2016.10.16	Renofa Yamaguchi FC	2-1	Tokushima Vortis	Ishin Memorial Park Stadium	4,008
37	2016.10.23	Tokushima Vortis	1-0	JEF United Chiba	Pocarisweat Stadium	3,946
38	2016.10.30	Zweigen Kanazawa	0-0	Tokushima Vortis	Ishikawa Athletics Stadium	4,612
39	2016.11.03	Mito HollyHock	0-3	Tokushima Vortis	K's denki Stadium Mito	4,247
40	2016.11.06	Tokushima Vortis	2-1	Hokkaido Consadole Sapporo	Pocarisweat Stadium	4,402
41	2016.11.12	Thespakusatsu Gunma	0-3	Tokushima Vortis	Shoda Shoyu Stadium Gunma	5,515
42	2016.11.20	Tokushima Vortis	1-2	Shimizu S-Pulse	Pocarisweat Stadium	9,767
