= Takafumi Suzuki =

Japanese footballer (born 1987)

Takafumi Suzuki 鈴木 崇文
Personal information
- Full name: Takafumi Suzuki
- Date of birth: November 17, 1987 (age 38)
- Place of birth: Moriya, Ibaraki, Japan
- Height: 1.70 m (5 ft 7 in)
- Position: Midfielder

Youth career
- 2006–2009: Tokyo Gakugei University

Senior career*
Years	Team	Apps	(Gls)
2010–2012	Machida Zelvia	87	(19)
2013	Fagiano Okayama	4	(0)
2014	→ Machida Zelvia	27	(9)
2015–2016	Machida Zelvia	60	(12)
2017–2018	Thespakusatsu Gunma	36	(1)
- * Club domestic league appearances and goals as of 23 February 2019

Takafumi Suzuki (鈴木 崇文, born November 17, 1987) is a Japanese football player for Thespakusatsu Gunma.

== Career statistics ==
Updated to 23 February 2019.

Appearances and goals by club, season and competition
Club	Season	League			Emperor's Cup		Total	
Club	Season	Division	Apps	Goals	Apps	Goals	Apps	Goals
Machida Zelvia	2010	JFL	16	2	2	0	18	2
Machida Zelvia	2011	JFL	33	10	2	1	35	11
Machida Zelvia	2012	J2 League	38	7	3	1	41	8
Fagiano Okayama	2013	J2 League	4	0	0	0	4	0
Machida Zelvia	2014	J3 League	27	9	–		27	9
Machida Zelvia	2015	J3 League	36	10	1	0	37	10
Machida Zelvia	2016	J2 League	24	2	–		0	0
Thespakusatsu Gunma	2017	J2 League	26	1	2	0	28	1
Thespakusatsu Gunma	2018	J3 League	10	0	0	0	10	0
Career total			214	41	10	2	224	43
