= Ryujoseph Hashimura =

Japanese footballer

Ryu Joseph Hashimura 橋村 龍ジョセフ
Personal information
- Full name: Ryu Joseph Hashimura
- Date of birth: August 23, 2000 (age 26)
- Place of birth: Fuchū, Tokyo, Japan
- Height: 1.77 m (5 ft 10 in)
- Position: Forward

Team information
- Current team: Machida Zelvia
- Number: 28

Youth career
- Hijirigaoka SC
- –2017: Machida Zelvia

Senior career*
Years	Team	Apps	(Gls)
2017–	Machida Zelvia	1	(0)
2019	→ PSTC (loan)		

International career
2017	Japan U17	4	(0)
- * Club domestic league appearances and goals as of 30 December 2018

Ryu Joseph Hashimura (橋村 龍ジョセフ, Hashimura Ryujosefu; born August 23, 2000) is a Japanese ex-football player and current Futsal player. He currently plays for Jonetu Loneliness Fuchu.

== Career ==
Ryujoseph Hashimura joined the J2 League club FC Machida Zelvia in 2017. In the same year, he would tour the US as part of Japan national under-17 football team.

On 7 February 2019, Hashimura was loaned out to the Brazilian club PSTC, playing in the Campeonato Paranaense Second Division. He appeared in three games, but scored no goals. He would return to Machida in 2020, but in the same year their contract would be cancelled due mutual decision.

In 2021, Ryu was transferred to Artista Asama.

In 2023, he was transferred to Japan Football League's team ReinMeer Aomori. He played only once for the team, entering at the 89th minute in a match against Briobecca Urayasu Ichikawa, where ReinMeer lost 2x1. At the end of the season, Ryu left the club.

In 2025, he played for Football seven-a-side team Svabo Tokyo, leaving at the end of the season, in which the team won the Tokyo League 2nd Division. In the same year, he was called by Japan's Football 7 national team.

In 2026, he joined Futsal team Jonetu Loneliness Fuchū.

== Club statistics ==
Updated to 22 February 2018.

Club performance			League		Cup		Total	
Season	Club	League	Apps	Goals	Apps	Goals	Apps	Goals
Japan			League		Emperor's Cup		Total	
2017	Machida Zelvia	J2 League	1	0	0	0	1	0
Total			1	0	0	0	1	0
