= 2015 Tokushima Vortis season =

Tokushima Vortis
2015 season
- Manager: Shinji Kobayashi
- Stadium: Pocarisweat Stadium
- J2 League: 14th

2015 Tokushima Vortis season.

== J2 League ==
=== League table ===
Pos	Team	Pld	W	D	L	GF	GA	GD	Pts
13	Roasso Kumamoto	42	13	14	15	42	45	−3	53
14	Tokushima Vortis	42	13	14	15	35	44	−9	53
15	Yokohama FC	42	13	13	16	33	58	−25	52

Source: Meiji Yasuda J2 League Standing
Rules for classification: 1) Points; 2) Goal difference; 3) Goals scored

=== Match details ===
J2 League match details
Match	Date	Team	Score	Team	Venue	Attendance
1	2015.03.08	Tokushima Vortis	0-0	Ehime FC	Pocarisweat Stadium	7,860
2	2015.03.15	Giravanz Kitakyushu	2-0	Tokushima Vortis	Honjo Stadium	3,556
3	2015.03.21	Tokushima Vortis	1-0	FC Gifu	Pocarisweat Stadium	4,733
4	2015.03.29	Tochigi SC	2-1	Tokushima Vortis	Tochigi Green Stadium	2,846
5	2015.04.01	Roasso Kumamoto	2-2	Tokushima Vortis	Umakana-Yokana Stadium	4,072
6	2015.04.05	Tokushima Vortis	1-2	Fagiano Okayama	Pocarisweat Stadium	5,086
7	2015.04.11	Mito HollyHock	3-0	Tokushima Vortis	Kasamatsu Stadium	2,290
8	2015.04.19	Tokushima Vortis	1-0	Kyoto Sanga FC	Pocarisweat Stadium	4,552
9	2015.04.26	Yokohama FC	1-1	Tokushima Vortis	NHK Spring Mitsuzawa Football Stadium	6,660
10	2015.04.29	Tokushima Vortis	0-0	Omiya Ardija	Pocarisweat Stadium	4,316
11	2015.05.03	Oita Trinita	1-1	Tokushima Vortis	Oita Bank Dome	6,615
12	2015.05.06	Tokushima Vortis	0-0	Zweigen Kanazawa	Pocarisweat Stadium	4,831
13	2015.05.09	V-Varen Nagasaki	1-1	Tokushima Vortis	Nagasaki Stadium	3,130
14	2015.05.17	Tokyo Verdy	0-0	Tokushima Vortis	Ajinomoto Stadium	3,648
15	2015.05.24	Tokushima Vortis	1-2	Consadole Sapporo	Pocarisweat Stadium	4,595
16	2015.05.31	Tokushima Vortis	2-2	Júbilo Iwata	Pocarisweat Stadium	5,606
17	2015.06.06	Avispa Fukuoka	1-0	Tokushima Vortis	Level5 Stadium	5,341
18	2015.06.14	Tokushima Vortis	2-2	Kamatamare Sanuki	Pocarisweat Stadium	6,304
19	2015.06.21	Cerezo Osaka	1-0	Tokushima Vortis	Kincho Stadium	11,332
20	2015.06.28	Tokushima Vortis	2-1	JEF United Chiba	Pocarisweat Stadium	4,120
21	2015.07.04	Thespakusatsu Gunma	2-1	Tokushima Vortis	Shoda Shoyu Stadium Gunma	2,781
22	2015.07.08	Kyoto Sanga FC	0-1	Tokushima Vortis	Kyoto Nishikyogoku Athletic Stadium	3,793
23	2015.07.12	Tokushima Vortis	0-1	Giravanz Kitakyushu	Pocarisweat Stadium	3,979
24	2015.07.18	Fagiano Okayama	0-3	Tokushima Vortis	City Light Stadium	8,276
25	2015.07.22	Tokushima Vortis	1-0	Oita Trinita	Pocarisweat Stadium	3,509
26	2015.07.26	Zweigen Kanazawa	0-1	Tokushima Vortis	Ishikawa Athletics Stadium	4,046
27	2015.08.01	JEF United Chiba	1-0	Tokushima Vortis	Fukuda Denshi Arena	8,391
28	2015.08.08	Tokushima Vortis	1-0	Mito HollyHock	Pocarisweat Stadium	3,958
29	2015.08.15	Tokushima Vortis	1-0	Tokyo Verdy	Pocarisweat Stadium	4,564
30	2015.08.23	Júbilo Iwata	3-1	Tokushima Vortis	Yamaha Stadium	9,435
31	2015.09.13	Tokushima Vortis	0-0	V-Varen Nagasaki	Pocarisweat Stadium	8,684
32	2015.09.20	Kamatamare Sanuki	0-1	Tokushima Vortis	Pikara Stadium	8,249
33	2015.09.23	Tokushima Vortis	0-0	Yokohama FC	Pocarisweat Stadium	4,876
34	2015.09.27	Tokushima Vortis	1-1	Cerezo Osaka	Pocarisweat Stadium	7,988
35	2015.10.04	FC Gifu	1-2	Tokushima Vortis	Gifu Nagaragawa Stadium	5,693
36	2015.10.10	Tokushima Vortis	0-1	Thespakusatsu Gunma	Pocarisweat Stadium	3,307
37	2015.10.18	Omiya Ardija	1-2	Tokushima Vortis	NACK5 Stadium Omiya	9,559
38	2015.10.25	Tokushima Vortis	0-3	Avispa Fukuoka	Pocarisweat Stadium	4,772
39	2015.11.01	Tokushima Vortis	1-1	Tochigi SC	Pocarisweat Stadium	3,634
40	2015.11.07	Consadole Sapporo	2-0	Tokushima Vortis	Sapporo Dome	14,428
41	2015.11.14	Tokushima Vortis	2-1	Roasso Kumamoto	Pocarisweat Stadium	4,124
42	2015.11.23	Ehime FC	3-0	Tokushima Vortis	Ningineer Stadium	9,158
