= Yoshinori Katsumata =

Japanese footballer (born 1985)

Yoshinori Katsumata 勝又 慶典
Personal information
- Full name: Yoshinori Katsumata
- Date of birth: December 7, 1985 (age 40)
- Place of birth: Fuji, Shizuoka, Japan
- Height: 1.74 m (5 ft 8 1/2 in)
- Position: Forward

Team information
- Current team: Ococias Kyoto AC
- Number: 10

Youth career
- 2004–2007: Toin University of Yokohama

Senior career*
Years	Team	Apps	(Gls)
2008–2012	Machida Zelvia	103	(54)
2013	Tochigi SC	8	(0)
2014–2018	Nagano Parceiro	115	(23)
2019–	Ococias Kyoto AC	12	(4)
- * Club domestic league appearances and goals as of 23 February 2020

Yoshinori Katsumata (勝又 慶典, born December 7, 1985) is a Japanese football player for Ococias Kyoto AC.

== Club statistics ==
Updated to 23 February 2020.

Club performance			League		Cup		Other		Total	
Season	Club	League	Apps	Goals	Apps	Goals	Apps	Goals	Apps	Goals
Japan			League		Emperor's Cup		Other^{1}		Total	
2008	Machida Zelvia	JRL (Kanto, Div. 1)	14	17	-		-		14	17
2009	Machida Zelvia	JFL	3	0	-		-		3	0
2010	Machida Zelvia	JFL	33	18	2	0	-		35	18
2011	Machida Zelvia	JFL	27	16	2	2	-		29	18
2012	Machida Zelvia	J2 League	26	3	3	0	-		29	3
2013	Tochigi SC	J2 League	8	0	1	0	-		9	0
2014	Nagano Parceiro	J3 League	32	9	2	0	2	0	36	9
2015	Nagano Parceiro	J3 League	32	8	1	0	-		33	8
2016	Nagano Parceiro	J3 League	21	4	2	2	-		23	6
2017	Nagano Parceiro	J3 League	19	2	1	0	-		20	2
2018	Nagano Parceiro	J3 League	11	0	2	0	-		13	0
2019	Ococias Kyoto AC	JRL (Kansai, Div. 1)	12	4	-		6	1	18	5
Total			238	81	16	4	8	1	262	86

^{1}Includes J2/J3 Playoffs and 2019 Japanese Regional Promotion Series.
