= Koji Suzuki (footballer) =

Japanese footballer (born 1989)

Personal information
- Date of birth: 25 July 1989 (age 37)
- Place of birth: Miura, Kanagawa, Japan
- Height: 1.78 m (5 ft 10 in)
- Position: Forward

Youth career
- Hasse JFC
- –2004: Yokohama F. Marinos
- 2005–2007: Toko Gakuen High School

College career
Years	Team	Apps	(Gls)
2008–2011	Hosei University		

Senior career*
Years	Team	Apps	(Gls)
2012–2018	Machida Zelvia	183	(68)
2019	FC Ryukyu	27	(15)
2019–2020	Cerezo Osaka	25	(1)
2021–2024	Albirex Niigata	100	(24)
Total		335	(108)
- * Club domestic league appearances and goals

Koji Suzuki (鈴木 孝司, born 25 July 1989) is a Japanese former professional footballer who played as a forward.

== Career ==
=== Machida Zelvia ===
Suzuki made his league debut against Tokyo Verdy on 1 April 2012. During the 2014 season, he won the J3 top goalscorer award, scoring 19 goals during the season. Suzuki won the SURUGA I DREAM Award for his goal against Nagoya Grampus on 9 September 2015, scoring in the 90th+3rd minute. On 1 February 2017, it was announced that Suzuki had surgery due to a Achilles tendon injury. On 7 December 2018, it was announced that FC Machida Zelvia would not be renewing Suzuki's contract for the 2019 season.

=== FC Ryukyu ===
Suzuki scored on his league debut, scoring a brace against Avispa Fukuoka on 24 February 2019. After scoring 8 goals, Suzuki won the 2019 February and March KONAMI Monthly MVP award.

=== Cerezo Osaka ===
On 13 August 2019, Suzuki was announced at Cerezo Osaka. He made his league debut against Yokohama F. Marinos on 17 August 2019. Suzuki scored his first league goal against Kawasaki Frontale on 1 September 2019.

=== Albirex Niigata ===
On 25 December 2020, Suzuki was announced at Albirex Niigata. He scored on his league debut, scoring against Giravanz Kitakyushu in the 57th minute on 27 February 2021. On 3 January 2022, his contract with the club was extended for the 2022 season. On 6 December 2022, Suzuki's contract was extended for the 2023 season. On 27 December 2023, his contract was extended for the 2024 season. After starting the game against Sagan Tosu on 24 February 2024, he was sidelined with an injury to his right foot. On 26 November 2024, it was announced that Suzuki's contract would not be renewed for the 2025 season.

On 21 January 2025, Suzuki announced his retirement from football, joining Yokohama F. Marinos as a school coach.

== Club statistics ==
Appearances and goals by club, season and competition
Club	Season	League			National cup (Note: Includes Emperors Cup)		League cup (Note: Includes J.League Cup)		Other		Total	
Club	Season	Division	Apps	Goals	Apps	Goals	Apps	Goals	Apps	Goals	Apps	Goals
Machida Zelvia	2012	J.League Division 2	18	0	1	0	–		0	0	19	0
Machida Zelvia	2013	JFL	32	15	0	0	–		0	0	32	15
Machida Zelvia	2014	J3 League	33	19	0	0	–		0	0	33	19
Machida Zelvia	2015	J3 League	31	12	2	1	–		2 (Note: Appearances in J2/J3 play-offs)	3	35	16
Machida Zelvia	2016	J2 League	25	12	0	0	–		0	0	25	12
Machida Zelvia	2017	J2 League	12	2	0	0	–		0	0	12	2
Machida Zelvia	2018	J2 League	30	5	1	0	–		0	0	31	5
Machida Zelvia	Total		181	65	4	1	0	0	2	3	187	69
FC Ryukyu	2019	J2 League	27	15	–		–		–		27	15
Cerezo Osaka	2019	J1 League	11	1	1	0	0	0	–		12	1
Cerezo Osaka	2020	J1 League	14	0	0	0	2	0	–		16	0
Cerezo Osaka	Total		25	1	1	0	2	0	0	0	28	1
Albirex Niigata	2021	J2 League	33	9	1	0	0	0	–		34	9
Albirex Niigata	2022	J2 League	21	9	0	0	0	0	–		21	9
Albirex Niigata	2023	J1 League	28	4	2	0	1	0	–		31	4
Albirex Niigata	2024	J1 League	18	2	1	1	4	0	–		23	3
Albirex Niigata	Total		100	24	4	1	5	0	0	0	109	25
Career total			333	105	9	2	7	0	2	3	351	110
