= 2014 J3 League =

J3 League
- Season: 2014
- Champions: Zweigen Kanazawa; 1st J3 title 1st D3 title
- Promoted: Zweigen Kanazawa
- Matches: 198
- Goals: 495 (2.5 per match)
- Top goalscorer: Koji Suzuki (19 goals)
- Highest attendance: 8,115; Zweigen vs MYFC
- Lowest attendance: 504; Fukushima vs Gainare
- Average attendance: 2,247

The 2014 J3 League (referred to as the 2014 Meiji Yasuda J3 League (2014 明治安田生命J3リーグ) for sponsorship reasons) was the 18th season of the third tier of the Japanese football, and the inaugural season of the professional J3 League. The season commenced on 9 March and will finish on November 23, with a 3-week break after the 17th week matches on 21 and 22 June (except one on 25 June), then will resume from 19 and 20 July, due to prefectural qualifiers, followed by the 1st and 2nd round matches of the 2014 Emperor's Cup scheduled during the intermission.

== Establishment ==
After the discussion on J1-J2 Joint Committee on 16 January 2013, all J. League clubs agreed in principle with an establishment of the new league starting 2014. This decision was formally put into force by J. League Council on 26 February executive meeting. The league was planned to launch with 10 teams, but another session of J. League Council in July decided that inaugural season of J3 will feature 12 teams.

== Clubs ==
Locations of the 2014 J3 League teams

In order to participate, a club must have held an associate membership, or had submitted an application before 30 June 2013, and then passed an inspection in order to obtain a participation licence issued by J. League Council. On November 19, J. League has confirmed the following clubs to participate in the inaugural J3 season:

Club name	Home town	Notes
Blaublitz Akita	All cities/towns in Akita	
Fukushima United	Fukushima, Fukushima	
Gainare Tottori	All cities/towns in Tottori	Relegated from 2013 J2, eligible for J2 promotion
Grulla Morioka	Morioka, Iwate	The only club promoted from Regional Leagues
Fujieda MYFC	Fujieda, Shizuoka	
Nagano Parceiro	Nagano, Nagano	Eligible for J2 promotion
FC Ryukyu	All cities/towns in Okinawa	
SC Sagamihara	Sagamihara, Kanagawa	
YSCC Yokohama	Yokohama, Kanagawa	
Machida Zelvia	Machida, Tokyo	Eligible for J2 promotion
Zweigen Kanazawa	Kanazawa, Ishikawa	Eligible for J2 promotion
J.League U-22 Selection	n/a	A special team, composed of best J1 and J2 youngsters in order to prepare them for 2016 Olympics

On 29 September the J. League licensing board issued J2 licenses to the following clubs: Machida Zelvia, Nagano Parceiro, Zweigen Kanazawa, and Gainare Tottori. Tottori's license was issued provisionally, under conditions of financial improvement before 30 October when the league re-assessed the club's financial stance and confirmed the passage of the licensing.

== Competition rules ==
The league will be played in three rounds, each team playing a total of 33 matches. J.League U-22 Selection will play all their matches on the road.

Each team must feature at least 3 players holding professional contracts. Two foreign players are allowed per team, plus 1 more from the ASEAN partner country of J. League. The matchday roster will consist of 16 players, and up to 5 substitutes will be allowed in a game.

=== Promotion and relegation ===
Rules for promotion to J2 will be largely similar to those of Japan Football League in the recent seasons: in order to be promoted, a club must hold a J2 license and finish in top 2 of the league. The U-22 team is not eligible for promotion regardless of their final position. The champions will be promoted directly, in exchange to 22nd-placed J2 club; and the runners-up will participate in the playoffs with 21st J2 club. If either or both top 2 finishers are ineligible for promotion, the playoffs and/or direct exchange will not be held in accordance to the exact positions of promotion-eligible clubs.

No relegation to JFL is planned. Up to 2 clubs may be promoted if they are licensed by J. League for J3 participation and finish in top-4 of JFL.

== Foreign players ==
Club	Player 1	Player 2	Player 3	Asian player	Non-visa foreign	Type-C contract
Blaublitz Akita	(Brazil) Leonardo			(South Korea) Lee Keun-ho		
Fukushima United	(South Korea) Kim Kong-Chyong			(North Korea) Kim Hong-Yeon		
Gainare Tottori						
Grulla Morioka						
Fujieda MYFC				(South Korea) Park Il-gyu		
Nagano Parceiro				(South Korea) Kim Yeong-Gi		
FC Ryukyu						
SC Sagamihara	(Brazil) Weslley	(United States) Mobi Fehr				
YSCC Yokohama					(Egypt) Osama Elsamni	
Machida Zelvia				(South Korea) Bae Dae-Won		
Zweigen Kanazawa				(South Korea) Choi Ji-Hoon		
J.League U-22 Selection^{1}						

Note:
^1A special team, composed of best J1 and J2 youngsters in order to prepare them to 2016 Olympics

== League table ==
Pos	Team	Pld	W	D	L	GF	GA	GD	Pts	Promotion or relegation
1	Zweigen Kanazawa (C, P)	33	23	6	4	56	20	+36	75	Promotion to 2015 J2 League (Note: Only clubs that hold J2 licence are eligible for promotion.)
2	Nagano Parceiro	33	20	9	4	58	23	+35	69	Qualification for J2 promotion playoffs
3	Machida Zelvia	33	20	8	5	59	22	+37	68	
4	Gainare Tottori	33	14	11	8	34	25	+9	53	
5	Grulla Morioka	33	12	9	12	43	39	+4	45	
6	SC Sagamihara	33	12	7	14	44	48	−4	43	
7	Fukushima United	33	9	9	15	30	38	−8	36	
8	Blaublitz Akita	33	10	4	19	38	57	−19	34	
9	FC Ryukyu	33	8	10	15	31	50	−19	34	
10	J.League U-22 Selection	33	9	6	18	37	63	−26	33	
11	Fujieda MYFC	33	7	9	17	36	52	−16	30	
12	YSCC Yokohama	33	4	12	17	29	58	−29	24	

Source: J.League
Rules for classification: 1) Points; 2) Goal differential; 3) Goals scored; 4) Head-to-head results; 5) Disciplinary points; 6) Draw.
(C) Champions; (P) Promoted

== Results ==
=== Rounds 1–11 ===
Home \ Away	BLA	FUK	GAI	GRU	MYF	PAR	RYU	SGM	YSC	ZEL	ZWE	J22
Blaublitz Akita		2–2	1–0	2–1	2–1	1–2						1–2
Fukushima United			0–1	0–2				1–2		1–0	0–1	0–1
Gainare Tottori				0–0		1–1	0–0	1–0		0–1		1–0
Grulla Morioka					4–1	0–0		2–3	3–0	1–4		6–1
Fujieda MYFC		0–0	0–2				2–2		1–2		0–0	2–4
Nagano Parceiro		1–0			1–4		1–0		0–0		2–1	1–0
FC Ryukyu	2–0	1–3		0–1				0–0		1–7		3–0
SC Sagamihara	3–0				2–1	2–2			2–0		0–4	0–1
YSCC Yokohama	1–1	0–1	0–2				1–4			1–1		0–2
Machida Zelvia	4–1				3–0	0–0		2–0			0–0	4–0
Zweigen Kanazawa	1–0		1–1	2–0			2–1		4–0			2–0
J.League U-22 Selection												

Updated to match(es) played on 11 May 2014. Source: J. League
Legend: Blue = home team win; Yellow = draw; Red = away team win.

=== Rounds 12–22 ===
Home \ Away	BLA	FUK	GAI	GRU	MYF	PAR	RYU	SGM	YSC	ZEL	ZWE	J22
Blaublitz Akita		0–1			2–2			1–0	3–4	1–4		4–0
Fukushima United			2–0		2–3		2–2	2–2		0–2		0–0
Gainare Tottori	1–4			1–0	0–0				0–0		4–2	1–0
Grulla Morioka	3–0	1–2					2–1		1–1		0–1	3–1
Fujieda MYFC				0–1		0–1	1–0		2–1	1–2		3–1
Nagano Parceiro	2–0	3–0	1–1	3–2							1–2	4–0
FC Ryukyu	2–0		0–3			0–2			1–1		1–0	0–6
SC Sagamihara			0–1	0–0	2–2	0–1	4–0					2–3
YSCC Yokohama		0–0				1–1		2–3		0–1	0–3	2–1
Machida Zelvia			1–1	1–1		1–0	0–1	2–1				1–1
Zweigen Kanazawa	1–0	2–2			3–1			2–1		0–1		0–0
J.League U-22 Selection												

Updated to match(es) played on 26 October 2014. Source: J. League
Legend: Blue = home team win; Yellow = draw; Red = away team win.

=== Rounds 23–33 ===
Home \ Away	BLA	FUK	GAI	GRU	MYF	PAR	RYU	SGM	YSC	ZEL	ZWE	J22
Blaublitz Akita				1–3			0–1		2–1	2–1	1–2	1–1
Fukushima United	2–0			0–1		0–1	2–1		2–2			0–0
Gainare Tottori	1–2	2–0			2–1	1–1					0–1	1–2
Grulla Morioka			1–1		0–2			0–3		1–1	0–2	2–1
Fujieda MYFC	1–2	0–2				2–2		1–1		0–1		2–1
Nagano Parceiro	3–0			3–0				2–0	6–1	2–0		5–0
FC Ryukyu			0–0	1–1	0–0	0–1					0–1	4–2
SC Sagamihara	2–1	1–0	1–0				1–1			1–2		1–5
YSCC Yokohama			1–2	0–0	2–0		0–0	2–4				1–1
Machida Zelvia		2–0	1–2				4–1		2–1		0–0	3–0
Zweigen Kanazawa		2–1			2–0	3–2		4–0	2–1			3–0
J.League U-22 Selection												

Updated to match(es) played on 23 November 2014. Source: J. League
Legend: Blue = home team win; Yellow = draw; Red = away team win.

== J2 promotion playoffs ==
2014 J2/J3 Play-Offs (2014 J2・J3入れ替え戦)
J3 runners-up Nagano Parceiro played the 21st-placed J2 club Kamatamare Sanuki in a two-legged playoffs. The winning club will play in J2 in 2015 season.

Team 1	Agg.	Team 2	1st leg	2nd leg
Kamatamare Sanuki	1–0	Nagano Parceiro	0–0	1–0

30 November 2014
12:30

Nagano Parceiro	0–0	Kamatamare Sanuki
	Report

Nagano Athletic Stadium, Nagano, Nagano
Attendance: 8,944
Referee: Itaru Hirose

7 December 2014
12:30

Kamatamare Sanuki	1–0	Nagano Parceiro

Kagawa Marugame Stadium, Marugame, Kagawa
Attendance: 6,170

Nagano Parceiro remains in J3 League.
Kamatamare Sanuki remains in J2 League.

== Top scorers ==
Rank	Scorer	Club	Goals
1	(Japan) Koji Suzuki	Machida Zelvia	19
2	(Japan) Tsugutoshi Oishi	Fujieda MYFC	17
3	(Japan) Yuji Unozawa	Nagano Parceiro	16
4	(Japan) Ryota Doi	Grulla Morioka	11
4	(Japan) Hirochika Miyoshi	Blaublitz Akita	11
6	(Japan) Akio Yoshida	YSCC Yokohama	10
7	(Japan) Yoshinori Katsumata	Nagano Parceiro	9
7	(Japan) Shohei Kiyohara	Zweigen Kanazawa	9
7	(Japan) Yuki Sato	Nagano Parceiro	9
7	(Japan) Takafumi Suzuki	Machida Zelvia	9

Updated per games played on 23 November 2014
Source: J. League data

== Attendance ==
Pos	Team	Total	High	Low	Average	Change
1	Nagano Parceiro	64,701	8,011	1,655	3,595	+53.7%
2	Zweigen Kanazawa	61,920	8,115	658	3,440	+66.7%
3	Machida Zelvia	56,404	4,569	2,012	3,134	−1.3%
4	SC Sagamihara	56,388	7,860	921	3,133	+62.8%
5	Gainare Tottori	55,242	5,892	1,832	3,069	−25.1%^{†}
6	Blaublitz Akita	31,921	2,488	1,057	1,773	+0.3%
7	Grulla Morioka	27,403	3,048	741	1,522	+103.5%^{‡}
8	FC Ryukyu	25,162	5,163	520	1,398	−32.4%
9	Fukushima United	23,769	4,163	504	1,321	+28.6%
10	Fujieda MYFC	23,733	3,302	612	1,319	+38.4%
11	YSCC Yokohama	18,323	1,819	512	1,018	+30.0%
	League total	444,966	8,115	504	2,247	+70.0%

Updated to games played on 23 November 2014
Source: J. League data
Notes:
League average is compared to JFL average of 2013.
^{†} Team played previous season in J2.
^{‡} Team played previous season in the Regional Leagues.
