= Naruto Athletic Stadium =

Stadium in Naruto, Tokushima, Japan

Pocari Sweat Stadium
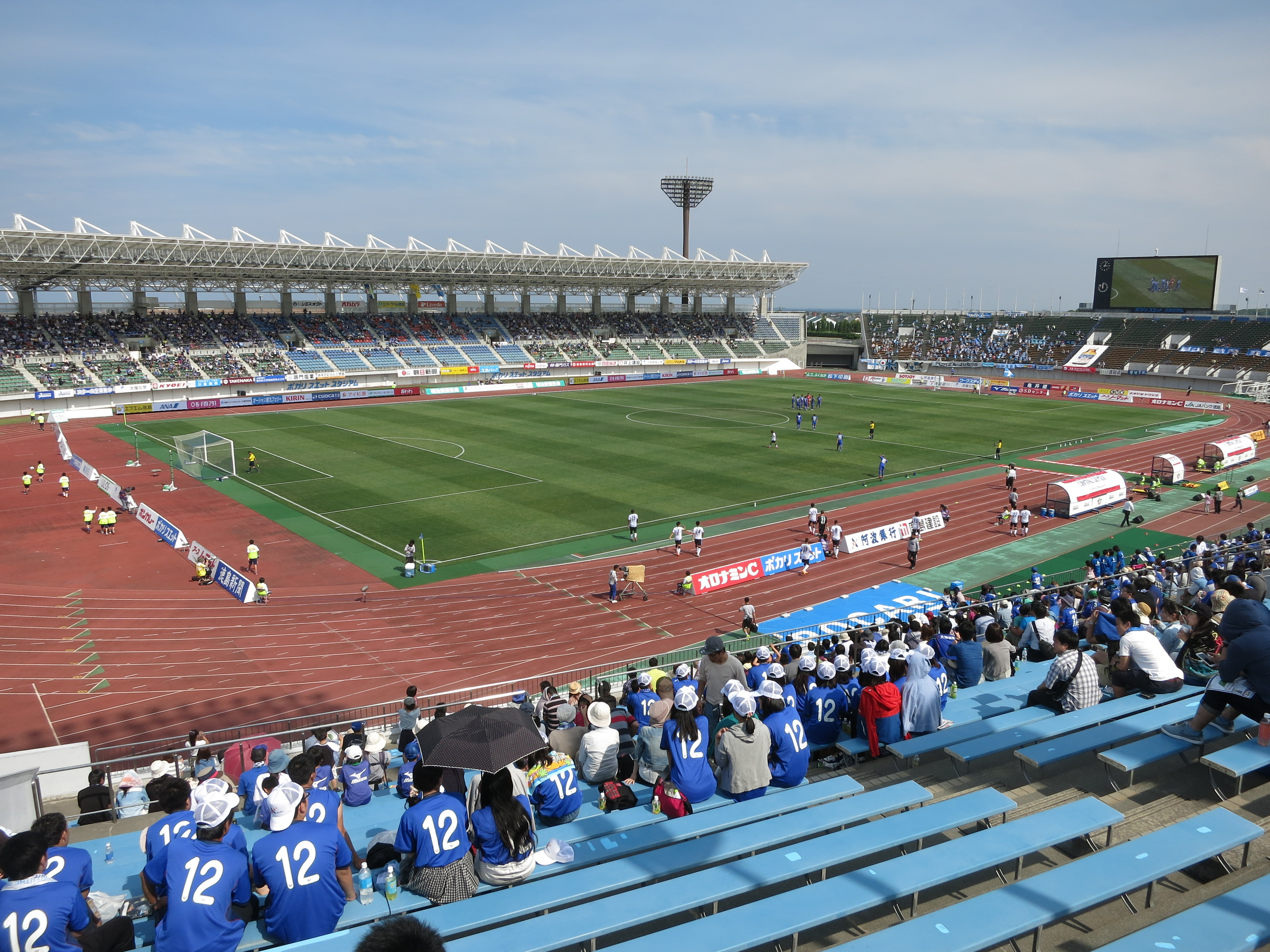
- Interactive map of Pocari Sweat Stadium
- Former names: Tokushima Naruto Stadium (1971–2007)
- Location: Naruto, Japan
- Coordinates: 34°10′06″N 134°37′04″E
- Owner: Tokushima Prefecture
- Capacity: 17,924
- Surface: Grass

Construction
- Opened: 1971
- Renovated: 1993, 2004

Tenant
- Tokushima Vortis

Pocari Sweat Stadium (ポカリスエットスタジアム) or Naruto Otsuka Sports Park Pocari Sweat Stadium (Japanese: 鳴門・大塚スポーツパークポカリスエットスタジアム) is a multi-purpose stadium in Naruto, Tokushima, Japan.

Its original name was Tokushima Naruto Stadium (Japanese: 徳島県鳴門総合運動公園陸上競技場), which was renamed by the naming rights by Otsuka Pharmaceutical and after its product Pocari Sweat.

It is currently used mostly for football matches. It serves as a home ground of Tokushima Vortis. The stadium holds 17,924 people since the most recent renovation works.
