= 2013 Japan Football League =

Japan Football League
- Season: 2013
- Champions: Nagano Parceiro; 1st JFL title 1st D3 title
- Promoted: Kamatamare Sanuki
- Matches: 306
- Goals: 784 (2.56 per match)
- Top goalscorer: Yuji Unozawa (20 goals)
- Highest attendance: 10,116; F.C. Ryukyu vs Uva
- Lowest attendance: 103; Printing vs Uva
- Average attendance: 1,322

The 2013 Japan Football League (Japanese: 第15回日本フットボールリーグ, Hepburn: Dai Jūgo-kai Nihon Futtobōru Rīgu) was the 17th season of the third tier of the Japanese football, and the 15th season since the establishment of Japan Football League. It started on 10 March and finished on 24 November.

== Clubs ==
Due to unfortunate withdrawal of Arte Takasaki, the previous season has featured only 17 teams, but for 2013 the league has brought the number of teams back to 18. After having another team (Sagawa Shiga) ceasing its operations and withdrawing after the season, the league has welcomed into its ranks two newcomers, SC Sagamihara and Fukushima United. Both clubs looked forward to eventual J. League promotion, with Sagamihara holding the associate membership status, and Fukushima having applied for it in 2007, though unsuccessfully.

Last season has for the first time ever featured direct exchange of teams between JFL and J. League. JFL champions and J. League associate members V-Varen Nagasaki were promoted at the expense of Machida Zelvia, who returned to JFL after only a single season in J2.

Tochigi Uva were on the brink of relegation, as their play-off series against Norbritz Hokkaido was tied after two rounds. It was decided in penalty shootout, which Tochigi club has won 4–1 and retained their place in the JFL.

On 26 February Blaublitz Akita and Zweigen Kanazawa were granted J. League associate membership status, bringing the number of such clubs to six, an all-time high mark for the league. On 20 August YSCC Yokohama's application was also granted by J. League, further increasing associate members count to seven. It raised again to 10 members after another J. League board session on 16 September, when applications of Fukushima United, FC Ryukyu and Fujieda MYFC were approved.

Club name	Home town	Notes
Blaublitz Akita	All cities/towns in Akita	J. League associate member
Fukushima United	Fukushima, Fukushima	Promoted from Tohoku league D1 in 2012. J.League associate member
Honda FC	Hamamatsu, Shizuoka	
Honda Lock	Miyazaki, Miyazaki	
Hoyo Oita	Ōita, Ōita	
Kamatamare Sanuki	All cities/towns in Kagawa	J. League associate member
MIO Biwako Shiga	Kusatsu, Shiga	
Fujieda MYFC	Fujieda, Shizuoka	J.League associate member
Nagano Parceiro	Nagano, Nagano	J. League associate member
SP Kyoto	Mukō, Kyoto	
FC Ryukyu	All cities/towns in Okinawa	J.League associate member
SC Sagamihara	Sagamihara, Kanagawa	Promoted from Kantō league D1 in 2012. J. League associate member
Sony Sendai	Tagajō, Miyagi	
Tochigi Uva	Tochigi, Tochigi	
Yokogawa Musashino	Musashino, Tokyo	
YSCC Yokohama	Yokohama, Kanagawa	J.League associate member
Machida Zelvia	Machida, Tokyo	Relegated from J2 in 2012, eligible for J2 promotion
Zweigen Kanazawa	Kanazawa, Ishikawa	J. League associate member

== Change in rules ==
Promotion to J. League Division 2
As in the previous year, the league winner was promoted to J. League Division 2 (J2) if it met promotion criteria, and the runner-up also promoted to J2 if it met the criteria and won a home-and-away play-off against a J2 club.
As the establishment of J3 League, if a playoff took place, the losing team would go to J3, but not staying to JFL.
Relegation to regional leagues
As the establishment of J3 League leads to a number of teams' transfer in next year, only promotion of teams from regional leagues took place, not relegation.

== Table ==
Pos	Team	Pld	W	D	L	GF	GA	GD	Pts	Qualification or relegation
1	Nagano Parceiro (C)	34	21	9	4	61	25	+36	72	Formed J3 League
2	**Kamatamare Sanuki** (Note: Kamatamare Sanuki topped the table at the end of the 17th round and thus were awarded JFL seed for 2013 Emperor's Cup.) (O, P)	34	21	5	8	49	26	+23	68	Qualification for promotion playoffs (Note: Direct promotion and pro/rele series took place only if there were promotion-eligible teams (shown in bold) that claimed either of two top spots in JFL.)
3	SC Sagamihara	34	18	7	9	58	42	+16	61	Formed J3 League
4	**Machida Zelvia**	34	18	7	9	51	44	+7	61	Formed J3 League
5	Honda FC	34	14	11	9	54	38	+16	53	
6	SP Kyoto	34	14	11	9	36	25	+11	53	
7	**Zweigen Kanazawa**	34	14	8	12	60	48	+12	50	Formed J3 League
8	Blaublitz Akita	34	14	8	12	48	45	+3	50	Formed J3 League
9	Sony Sendai	34	12	14	8	33	34	−1	50	
10	Yokogawa Musashino	34	13	10	11	36	36	0	49	
11	FC Ryukyu	34	12	10	12	47	51	−4	46	Formed J3 League
12	YSCC Yokohama	34	11	6	17	45	56	−11	39	Formed J3 League
13	Fujieda MYFC	34	9	9	16	40	58	−18	36	Formed J3 League
14	Fukushima United	34	8	10	16	35	42	−7	34	Formed J3 League
15	Hoyo Oita	34	9	5	20	32	45	−13	32	
16	MIO Biwako Shiga	34	8	6	20	40	56	−16	30	
17	Tochigi Uva	34	9	3	22	34	66	−32	30	
18	Honda Lock	34	6	11	17	25	47	−22	29	

Updated to match(es) played on 8 December 2013. Source: Japan Football League
Rules for classification: 1) Points; 2) Goal differential; 3) Goals scored; 4) Head-to-head results; 5) Disciplinary points; 6) draw. If two clubs were tied for first place, both clubs would be declared champions.
(C) Champions; (O) Play-off winners; (P) Promoted

== Results ==
Home \ Away	BLA	FUK	HON	LOC	HOY	KAM	MIO	MYF	PAR	PRI	RYU	SGM	SON	UVA	YMC	YSC	ZEL	ZWE
Blaublitz Akita		1–0	2–0	1–1	1–1	2–1	2–1	3–6	1–1	1–0	2–2	2–1	4–0	2–0	1–1	4–0	2–2	1–4
Fukushima United	2–3		3–3	0–1	0–2	1–2	0–3	2–1	0–1	0–0	0–0	1–2	0–2	0–2	2–0	0–1	1–2	3–0
Honda FC	3–1	1–1		2–0	3–2	0–2	1–1	3–2	1–3	1–1	1–2	2–1	0–1	5–0	0–0	2–0	3–0	0–0
Honda Lock	0–1	2–2	0–0		2–0	0–1	1–0	1–1	0–4	0–3	2–2	2–4	2–2	1–1	1–2	0–0	2–0	1–5
Hoyo Oita	0–2	3–0	0–2	0–2		1–3	2–1	2–0	1–3	0–0	0–1	0–1	1–1	0–1	0–1	3–2	1–2	0–3
Kamatamare Sanuki	1–0	0–0	2–0	2–0	0–1		2–1	2–2	0–0	0–0	3–0	1–0	2–0	1–0	1–0	1–0	0–1	3–2
MIO Biwako Shiga	3–0	1–0	0–2	1–0	2–0	0–4		0–2	1–5	0–1	4–1	0–1	0–0	0–4	1–2	1–2	2–3	2–2
Fujieda MYFC	2–1	0–2	3–3	2–0	0–0	0–1	0–3		2–1	1–0	1–5	2–2	1–2	2–0	1–4	1–2	1–0	1–1
Nagano Parceiro	1–0	1–0	1–1	1–0	2–0	1–1	2–2	0–0		2–1	1–0	1–0	5–0	0–2	1–0	3–1	5–1	2–1
SP Kyoto	2–0	0–2	0–1	2–0	2–1	3–1	0–2	2–0	1–1		3–2	2–1	0–0	2–1	1–1	0–1	1–2	3–0
FC Ryukyu	1–1	1–1	1–1	1–1	1–0	2–1	3–1	0–0	0–1	2–1		2–2	1–1	1–2	1–0	0–3	1–2	0–1
SC Sagamihara	1–1	3–2	0–4	2–1	3–2	0–1	2–1	3–1	2–1	0–0	0–1		0–0	2–0	1–0	4–0	1–4	1–1
Sony Sendai	2–1	0–0	3–1	3–1	0–0	1–0	0–0	1–1	2–1	0–1	2–3	0–2		2–1	1–0	2–0	0–1	1–1
Tochigi Uva	1–2	1–5	0–3	0–1	0–5	2–1	3–2	1–2	2–3	1–2	2–1	3–4	1–1		1–2	0–1	0–0	0–4
Yokogawa Musashino	1–0	1–1	2–2	1–0	0–1	2–3	2–0	2–0	0–0	0–0	2–1	0–4	0–0	1–0		0–5	0–1	4–2
YSCC Yokohama	0–2	1–2	2–1	0–0	2–1	2–4	1–1	1–2	1–1	0–0	1–4	1–4	0–1	4–0	1–3		1–1	5–2
Machida Zelvia	2–0	0–1	1–2	0–0	1–0	2–1	3–1	3–0	0–4	0–0	3–4	1–2	1–1	3–1	2–2	3–2		2–1
Zweigen Kanazawa	2–1	1–1	1–0	1–0	1–2	0–1	3–2	4–1	1–2	1–2	5–0	2–2	2–1	2–0	0–0	3–2	1–2	

Updated to match(es) played on 24 November 2013. Source: Japan Football League: first round, second round
Legend: Blue = home team win; Yellow = draw; Red = away team win.

== Top scorers ==
Rank	Scorer	Club	Goals
1	(Japan) Yuji Unozawa	Nagano Parceiro	20
2	(Japan) Ryosuke Kijima	Kamatamare Sanuki	15
2	(Japan) Koji Suzuki	Machida Zelvia	15
4	(Japan) Shohei Kiyohara	Zweigen Kanazawa	13
4	(Japan) Yuki Matsumoto	SC Sagamihara	13
4	(Japan) Yatsunori Shimaya	Hoyo Oita	13
4	(Japan) Shunta Takahashi	FC Ryukyu	13
8	(Japan) Kazuki Ganaha	FC Ryukyu	12
8	(Japan) Sho Gokyu	SC Sagamihara	12
8	(Japan) Goshi Okubo	Sony Sendai	12

Updated to games played on 24 November 2013
Source: Japan Football League

== Attendances ==
Pos	Team	Total	High	Low	Average	Change
1	Machida Zelvia	53,956	6,379	2,317	3,174	−12.5%^{†}
2	Kamatamare Sanuki	53,129	8,968	1,037	3,125	+33.3%
3	Nagano Parceiro	39,768	3,213	1,418	2,339	−16.8%
4	FC Ryukyu	35,180	10,116	846	2,069	−4.4%
5	Zweigen Kanazawa	35,074	8,112	699	2,063	−10.8%
6	SC Sagamihara	32,705	4,893	513	1,924	n/a^{‡}
7	Blaublitz Akita	30,057	4,889	1,011	1,768	+55.6%
8	Fukushima United	17,464	2,195	339	1,027	−19.2%^{‡}
9	Fujieda MYFC	16,209	1,563	565	953	+79.1%
10	YSCC	13,310	1,889	355	783	+10.3%
11	Yokogawa Musashino	13,085	2,257	298	770	+7.7%
12	Honda FC	12,824	1,238	354	754	−8.4%
13	Sony Sendai	10,929	951	334	643	+9.4%
14	Tochigi Uva	10,276	1,679	239	604	+23.0%
15	MIO Biwako Shiga	9,233	1,091	224	543	−14.8%
16	Honda Lock	8,727	1,153	283	513	−5.9%
17	SP Kyoto	6,982	1,004	103	405	+3.8%
18	Hoyo Oita	5,654	641	218	333	−30.5%
	League total	404,472	10,116	103	1,322	+6.6%

Updated to games played on 24 November 2013
Source: Japan Football League: first round, second round
Notes:
^{†} Team played previous season in J2
^{‡} Team played previous season in Regional Leagues.

== Post-season promotion and relegation ==
=== J2 Promotion playoffs ===
2013 J2/JFL Play-Offs (2013 J2・JFL入れ替え戦)
After conclusion of the JFL and J2 seasons, playoffs for participation in 2014 J2 season were contested by lowest-placed J2 club Gainare Tottori and Kamatamare Sanuki, who possess J2 license and have finished second in JFL. The playoffs took place on 1 and 8 December.

Team 1	Agg.	Team 2	1st leg	2nd leg
Gainare Tottori	1–2	Kamatamare Sanuki	1–1	0–1

1 December 2013
13:03

Kamatamare Sanuki	1–1	Gainare Tottori
Takahashi 47'	Report	50' Mori

Kagawa Marugame Stadium, Marugame, Kagawa
Attendance: 5,793
Referee: Yosuke Kubota

8 December 2013
13:00

Gainare Tottori	0–1	Kamatamare Sanuki
	Report	20' Takahashi

Tottori Bank Bird Stadium, Tottori, Tottori
Attendance: 6,313
Referee: Koichiro Fukushima

Kamatamare Sanuki won the playoffs on aggregate and were promoted to 2014 J. League Division 2. Gainare Tottori were relegated to the newly created 2014 J3 League.

=== Promotion from Regional Leagues ===
After 10 of 18 teams were set to leave JFL for the newly created J3, the league announced that it would suffer a contraction and only 14 teams would participate in 2014. The league accommodated all winners of the Regional League promotion series and accepted applications from other Regional clubs that were willing to participate in the nationwide league.

The top three spots of the Regional League promotion series were occupied by Grulla Morioka, Fagiano Okayama Next and FC Kagoshima respectively, and Volca Kagoshima took the last spot. However, the Morioka club has been chosen by J. League for participation in the 2014 J3 season, and both Kagoshima clubs have announced their post-season merger to Kagoshima United. On 4 December the league announced the final list of promoted teams:

- Fagiano Okayama Next – Chūgoku Soccer League champions, 2nd place in Regional promotion play-offs.
- Kagoshima United – new club, created on merger of Volca Kagoshima and FC Kagoshima, Kyushu Soccer League respective champions and runners-up
- Vanraure Hachinohe – Tōhoku Soccer League runners-up, and J. League associate members
- Azul Claro Numazu – Tōkai Soccer League 4th place, and J. League associate members
- Maruyasu Industries – Tōkai Soccer League champions
- Renofa Yamaguchi – Chūgoku Soccer League 3rd place, Shakaijin Cup winners, and J. League associate members
