= FC Machida Zelvia =

Japanese football club

Machida Zelvia 町田ゼルビア
- Full name: Football Club Machida Zelvia
- Nickname: Zelvia
- Founded: 1989; 37 years ago as FC Machida
- Ground: Machida GION Stadium; Machida, Tokyo
- Capacity: 15,489
- Owner: CyberAgent
- Chairman: Takehisa Otomo
- Manager: Go Kuroda
- League: J1 League
- 2026: J1 League, 5th of 20
- Website: zelvia.co.jp
Home colours	Away colours

Football Club Machida Zelvia (フットボールクラブ町田ゼルビア, Futtobōru Kurabu Machida Zerubia), commonly known as Machida Zelvia (町田ゼルビア, Efu Shi Machida Zerubia), is a Japanese professional football club based in Machida, Tokyo. They currently play in the J1 League, following promotion as J2 League champions in 2023.

Throughout the club history, they have won 1 J2 League and 1 Emperor's Cup. In the club first season in AFC Champions League Elite, they finished as runners-up.

== History ==
=== Formation and election to the Prefectural League (1989–2002) ===
The roots of the current iteration of Machida Zelvia originated from a training center for youth football players, known as the "FC Machida Training Center". In 1989, at the suggestion of the chairman of the city football association, Sadao Shigeta, FC Machida Top was founded.

=== From non-League to Japan Football League (2002–2011) ===
In 2003, they became a multi-sport club under the name Athletic Club Machida, and in 2005 were promoted to the Kanto League, having won the Tokyo Prefectural League (First Division). They came first in the Kanto league (Second Division) the following year and were promoted to First Division, where they stayed until promotion to the Japan Football League as champions of the Regional Promotion Playoff Series in 2008.

In 2009, they adopted the current nickname "Zelvia", a portmanteau of the Latin words zelkova (Machida City's official tree) and salvia (Machida city's official flower) thus renaming themselves as Machida Zelvia.

The same year, the club declared its intent to be promoted to J. League's 2nd division, and its status of semi-affiliate was officially approved by the J. League. However, its home stadium capacity and light specifications did not meet the J. League's requirements, average attendance did not reach 3,000, and the team's final position of 6th place did not allow for Zelvia's promotion to the J. League.

In 2010, Machida appointed Naoki Soma, a former star player who played in the 1998 FIFA World Cup, as its new head coach. The stadium's lighting was renewed, and the club added several J. League players to its roster. Machida also announced its partnership with Major League Soccer's D.C. United, which became the first historic partnership between a Japanese and American club. The reborn team beat Tokyo Verdy, its arch-rival from the J. League, in the 2010 Emperor's Cup, but was knocked out by Albirex Niigata in the third round. Soma left at the end of the season and was replaced by Serbian Ranko Popović, former coach of Oita Trinita.

=== Yo-yo years (2012–2022) ===
The stadium's capacity and conditions were still short of fulfilling J. League criteria, so the club completed another renovation between the end of the 2010 and the start of the 2011 seasons. Machida finished the 2011 season in third place after beating Kamatamare Sanuki in the final match of that season, thereby granting them promotion to J. League (Second Division), but were relegated after a bottom-placed finish. They became one of the original J3 clubs after finishing in 4th place in the 2014 JFL season and returned to J2 as 2015 runners-up by beating Oita Trinita in the promotion/relegation play-off. In the first return to J2 in the 2016 season, Machida were able to finish in 7th position, only four points short of the play-offs spot.

In 2017, Machida fell off more than a half place down to 15th with fifty points, twelve points up of relegation zone. In the 2018 season, while Machida culminated a great campaign by finishing inside the promotion play-offs zone of 4th place, Machida were unable to participate in the phase because they did not have a J1 League-level license. The 2019 season also saw the club fell down far on the table as they finished in 18th position, three points up from relegation places occupied by Kagoshima United and FC Gifu. At the end of this season the club acquired a J1 license.

In 2020, Machida finished in 19th. While they were able to conclude their 2021 campaign by finishing in 5th position, no promotion play-offs were held in this season, mainly because no relegation in the previous season due to COVID-19 pandemic, so Machida remain in J2. In 2022 season, Machida once again fell far below their position of the previous campaign by finishing in the 15th position. After the conclusion of the 2022 season, manager Ranko Popović left the club.

=== Go Kuroda's era (2023–present) ===
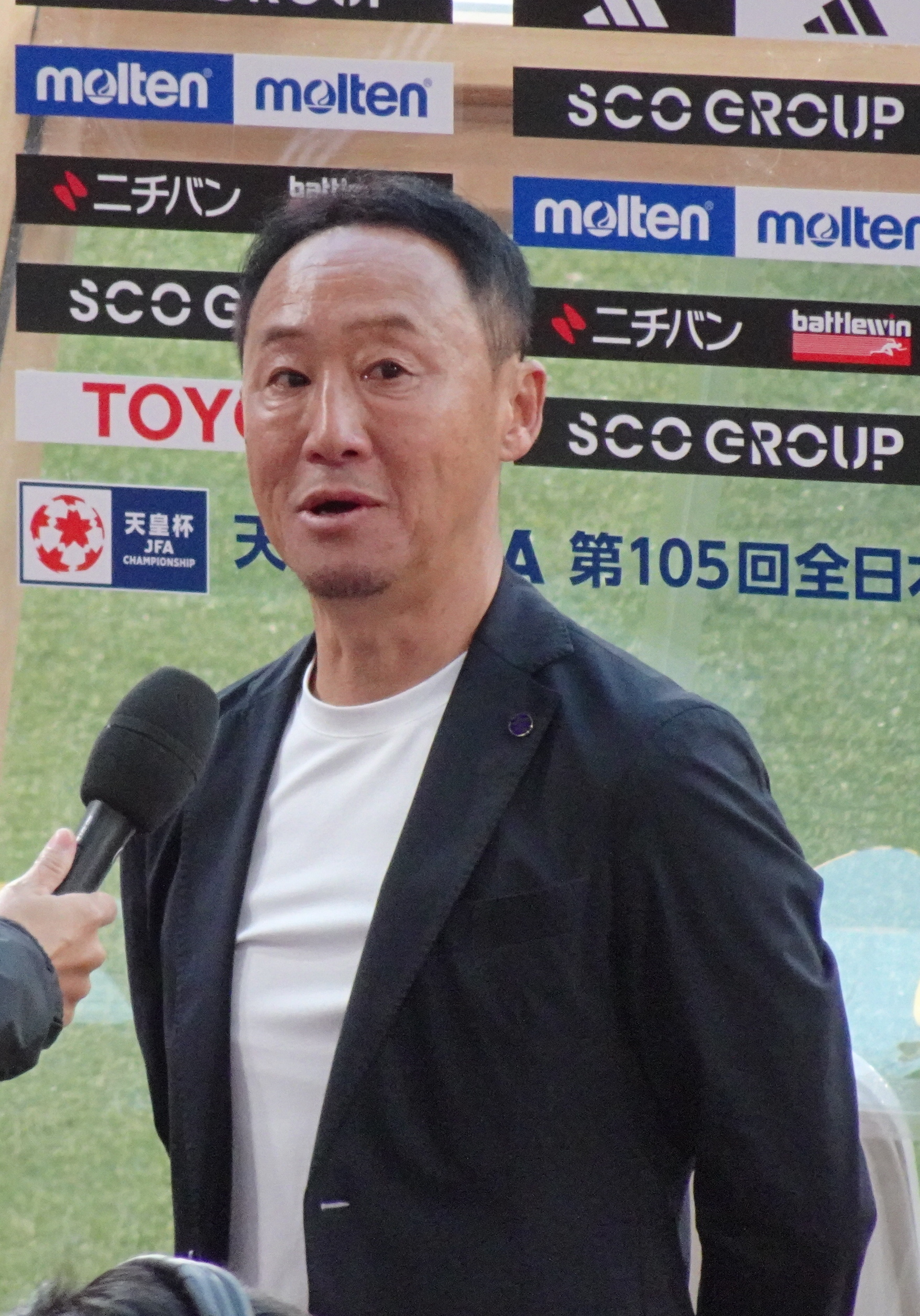
Go Kuroda made history by transitioning directly from nearly 28 years of coaching high school to the professional ranks, rapidly guiding Machida from the second division to the top flight and continental prominence

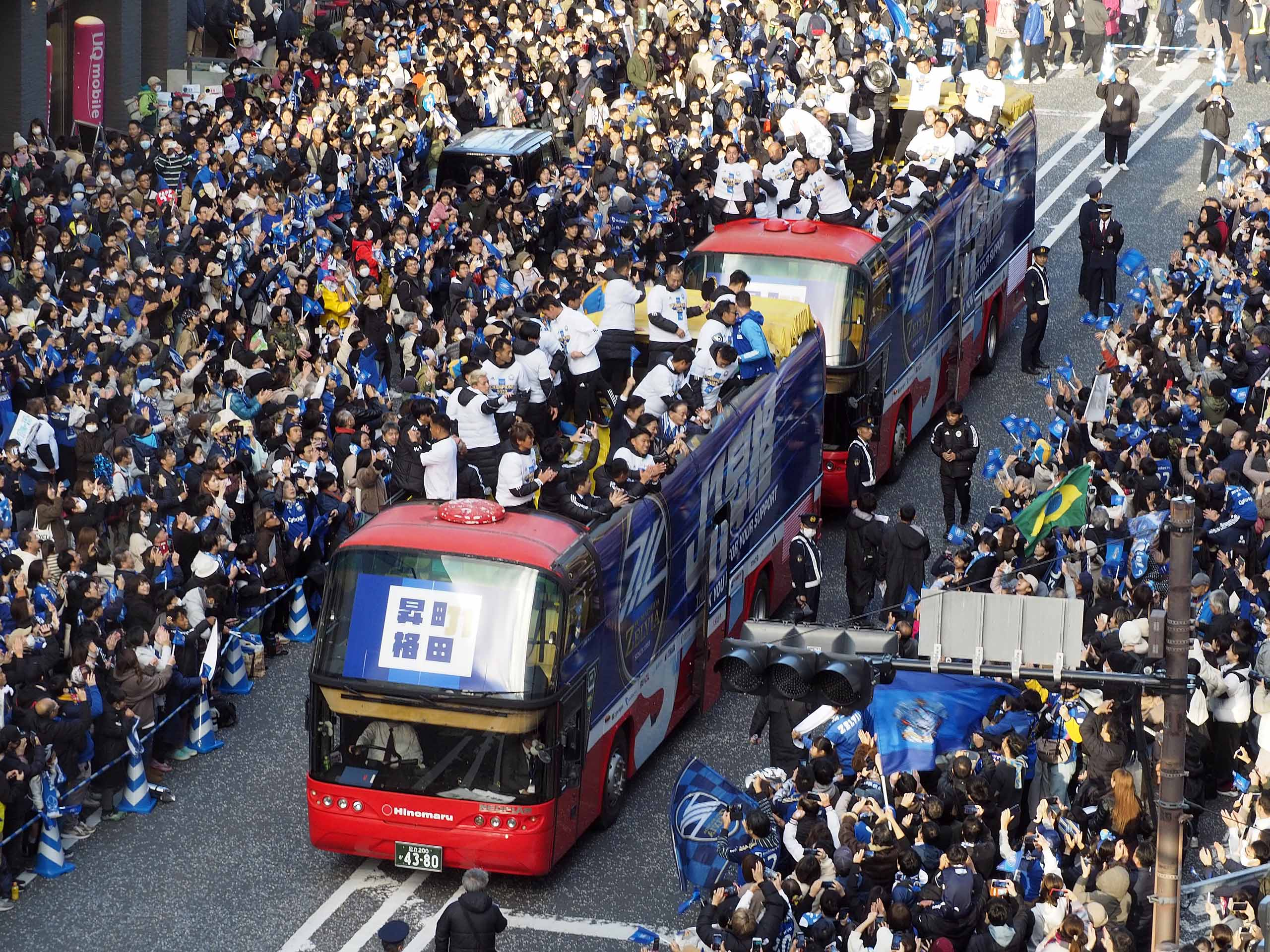
Machida Zelvia's victory parade on 18 November 2023 after winning the J2 League title.

==== First silverware of professional era and J1 League debut ====
In February 2023, Machida appointed Go Kuroda as their manager ahead of the 2023 season. It was Kuroda first professional managerial career after he spend 28 years building Aomori Yamada High School into a national powerhouse. Machida emerged as one of the league's strongest and on 22 October 2023, after a seven-year run in J2 League, Machida eventually achieved promotion to the J1 League for the first time in the club history with manager Go Kuroda guiding Machida to the 2023 J2 League title with 87 points following their 3–0 away win against Roasso Kumamoto in matchweek 39 on 28 October after a 1–0 victory over Zweigen Kanazawa. The club also confirmed their status as champions of the second division on 28 October 2023 after Kumamoto defeated Shimizu S-Pulse 3–1. Machida established themselves near the top of the standings early in the season and maintained their position throughout the campaign. The team combined one of the league's most productive attacks with one of its strongest defensive records. Brazilian forward Erik was a key contributor, scoring 18 league goals and providing six assists.

==== AFC Champions League Elite debut and finalist ====
Machida started off their debut 2024 J1 League season on 24 February 2024 against Gamba Osaka in a 1–1 draw with Junya Suzuki scoring their historic first top-tier league goal for the club. Machida went on to have a magnificent run in the first few matches leading at the top of the J1 League table with three wins, one draw and zero lost with 10 points. Machida then went on to finished in third place in their debut season where they also qualified for the 2025–26 AFC Champions League Elite. On 16 September 2025, Machida played their first continental match in a 1–1 draw to Korean club FC Seoul and they secured their historic first win by a score of 2–0, away against the Chinese club, Shanghai Port. Machida went on to top the league phase as group leaders with 17 points in their debut season which sees them qualified to the knockout stage. Machida then faced off against Korean club Gangwon FC in the round of 16 tie. Hotaka Nakamura scored the only goal in the tie in the 2nd leg which saw Machida qualifying to the quarter-finals on a 1–0 aggregate. Machida then faced off against Saudi Arabian club Al-Ittihad in the quarter-finals. Tete Yengi then went on to scored the only goal thus seeing Machida qualified to the semi-finals. In the semi-finals, Machida faced off against Emirati club Shabab Al Ahli where Yūki Sōma then scored the only goal in the match to secured Machida in the final of the tournament. In the 2026 AFC Champions League Elite final, Machida faced off against defending champions, Al-Ahli. The match ended in extra time which then saw Machida lost the final.

==== Emperor's Cup winner ====
On 22 November 2025, Machida took home Emperor's Cup for the first time in their history after defeating Vissel Kobe 3–1 at the Japan National Stadium which saw the club qualified to the 2026–27 AFC Champions League Two. Machida was then drawn in Group G alongside Chinese club Shanghai Shenghua, Cambodian club Preah Khan Reach Svay Rieng and Singaporean club Tampines Rovers.

== Stadium ==
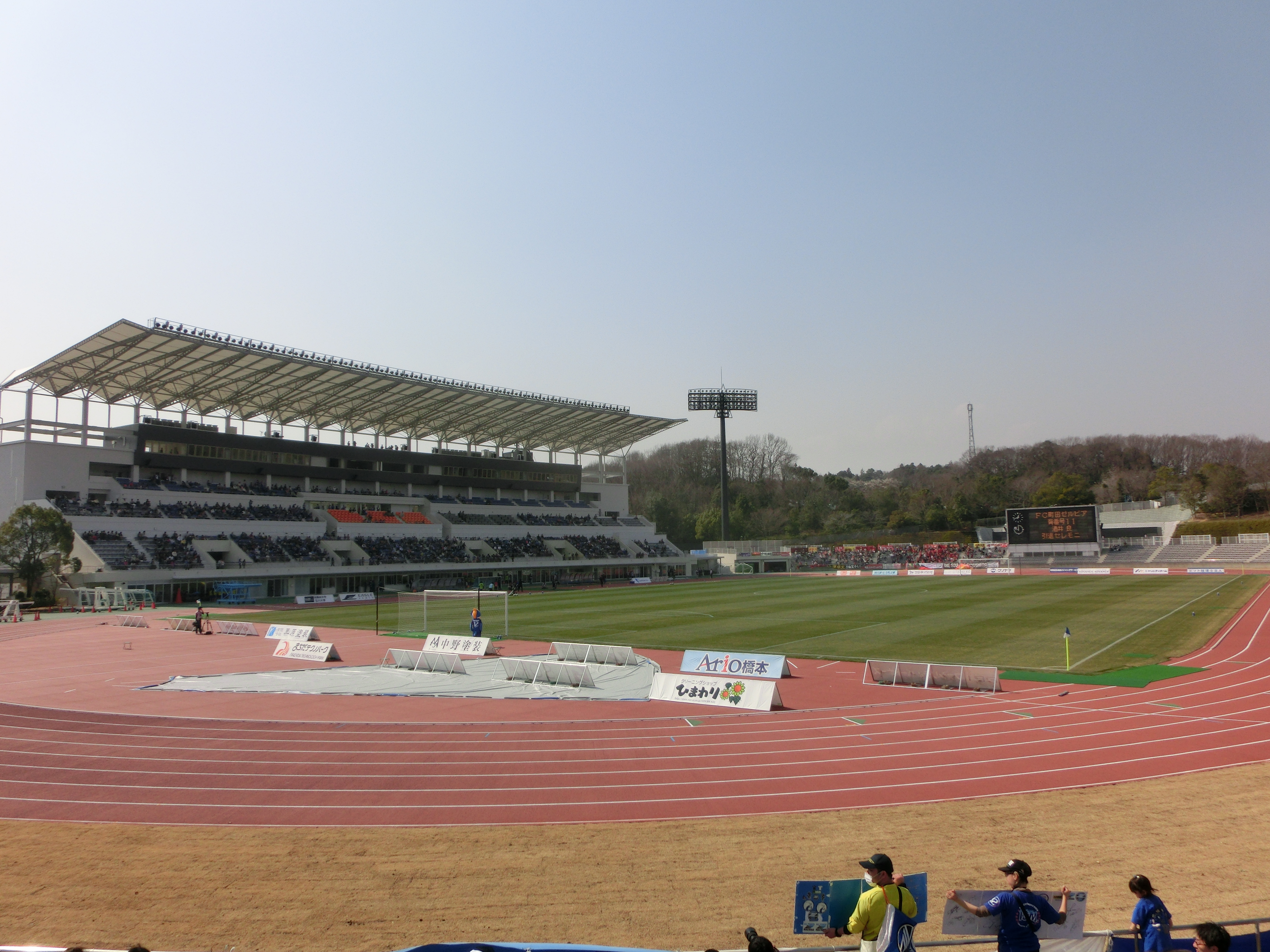
Machida GION Stadium.

Machida currently play their home matches at Machida GION Stadium, also known as Nozuta Stadium. Until 2011, the stadium's capacity was 6,200, including grassy areas, and it has featured lighting for night games since 2009. The stadium underwent renovations between the 2010 and 2011 seasons and now offers all-seated accommodations.

Although the J2 League requires a minimum seating capacity of 10,000, the stadium initially did not meet this criterion. Nonetheless, an agreement with J-League officials allows for home games expecting large crowds to be held at alternative stadiums for such occasions. Meanwhile, GION Stadium was upgraded to fulfill the 10,000-seat minimum. Its current capacity stands at 15,489. In the 2024 season, the club's inaugural season in the top division of Japanese football, they hosted four matches at the new Japan National Stadium.

== Kit suppliers and shirt sponsors ==
=== Sponsors ===
Year	Kit Manufacturer	Main Sponsor
2004–2006	(Italy) Dell'erba	No main sponsor
2007–2008	(Denmark) Hummel	(Japan) Pherrow's Sportswear
2009	In house production	No main sponsor
2010–2011	(Japan) SVOLME	(Japan) Odakyu
2012–2018	(Japan) SVOLME	(Japan) Eagle Kenso
2019–2022	(Japan) SVOLME	(Japan) Abema
2023–present	(Germany) Adidas	(Japan) CyberAgent

=== Kit evolution ===
Home kit - 1st
2010	2011	2012	2013	2014
2015	2016	2017	2018	2019
2020	2021	2022	2023	2024
2025	2026 -			

Away kit - 2nd
2010	2011	2012	2013	2014
2015	2016	2017	2018	2019
2020	2021	2022	2023	2024
2025

Special kit - 3rd
2014; 25th anniv.	2019; 30th anniv.	2022 - 3rd	2024; 35th anniv.	ACLE; 2025/26; 1st
ACLE; 2025/26; 2nd

== Players ==
=== First-team squad ===
As of 16 September 2026.

Note: Flags indicate national team as defined under FIFA eligibility rules; some limited exceptions apply. Players may hold more than one non-FIFA nationality.

No.	Pos.	Nation	Player
1	GK	JPN	Kōsei Tani
2	DF	NED	Thomas Ouwejan
3	DF	JPN	Gen Shoji (captain)
4	DF	JPN	Ryuho Kikuchi
5	DF	KOS	Ibrahim Drešević
6	DF	JPN	Henry Heroki Mochizuki
7	FW	JPN	Yūki Sōma
8	MF	JPN	Keiya Sento
9	FW	JPN	Kōki Ogawa
13	GK	JPN	Tatsuya Morita
14	MF	JPN	Yūsuke Matsuo
15	FW	AUS	Mitch Duke
16	MF	JPN	Hiroyuki Mae
18	MF	JPN	Hokuto Shimoda (vice-captain)

No.	Pos.	Nation	Player
20	FW	JPN	Takuma Nishimura
23	MF	JPN	Ryōhei Shirasaki
24	DF	KOR	Kim Min-tae
28	MF	KOR	Cha Je-hoon
29	DF	JPN	Futo Nishikawa ^{DSP}
31	MF	ISR	Neta Lavi
33	MF	JPN	Takahiro Akimoto
34	FW	JPN	Futa Tokumura
50	DF	JPN	Daihachi Okamura
66	GK	JPN	Aki Koch-Kobayashi
88	DF	JPN	Hotaka Nakamura
89	GK	PHI	Nicholas Guimarães
99	FW	AUS	Tete Yengi

=== Out on loan ===
Note: Flags indicate national team as defined under FIFA eligibility rules; some limited exceptions apply. Players may hold more than one non-FIFA nationality.

No.	Pos.	Nation	Player
—	GK	USA	Anton Burns (at Gainare Tottori)
—	DF	JPN	Takumi Narasaka (at Giravanz Kitakyushu)
—	MF	JPN	Atsushi Kurokawa (at (Latvia) FK Tukums 2000)

No.	Pos.	Nation	Player
—	MF	JPN	Kosei Ashibe (at Fukushima United)
—	MF	JPN	Tenshiro Takasaki (at (Brazil) Grêmio)
—	MF	JPN	Asahi Masuyama (at V-Varen Nagasaki)

== Management and staff ==
Club officials for 2025 season.

Position	Name
Manager	(Japan) Go Kuroda
Assistant manager	(Japan) Kenji Arima
First-team coach	(Japan) Shin Yamanaka (Japan) Hikaru Mita (Japan) Daiki Ueda
Goalkeeping coach	(Japan) Yukiya Hamano
Fitness coach	(Japan) Shunsuke Otsuka
Interpreter and first-team coach	(Japan) Leonardo Moreira
Analytics coach and Head of analysts	(Japan) Yasuhiko Nishimura
Analytical coach	(Japan) Yoshiro Akano
Technical staff	(Japan) Sota Kinoshita (Japan) Ryang Yoon-ho
Interpreter	(Japan) Go Murakami (Japan) Ken Takahashi (South Korea) Lee Seong-ang
Chief trainer	(Japan) Yasuyuki Sasaki
Trainer	(Japan) Yuta Hamada (Japan) Shin Osawa (Japan) Takashi Imai
Physiotherapist	(Japan) Takuro Yoshitake
Medical coordinator	(Japan) Akihisa Yamamoto
Chief manager	(Japan) Naoya Watanabe
Sub manager	(Japan) Ryota Kiyofuji
Kit manager	(Japan) Hiroyuki Kawakita (Japan) Yuto Suzuki
Nutrition management advisor	(Japan) Jun Hamano
Chief doctor	(Japan) Takahiro Fujisawa (Japan) Keisuke Irako

== Honours ==
Type	Honours	Titles	Season
League	J2 League	1	2023
League	Kantō Soccer League Division 1	1	2007, 2008
League	Kantō Soccer League Division 2	1	
League	Japanese Regional Football Champions League	1	2008
Cup	Emperor's Cup	1	2025

Bold is for those competition that are currently active or meant for professional leagues.

== Records and statistics ==
As of 23 March 2026.

Top 10 all-time appearances
Rank	Player	Years	Club appearance
1	(Japan) Kota Fukatsu	2009–2010, 2013–2023	379
2	(Japan) Yuki Nakashima	2016–2026	287
3	(Japan) Masayuki Okuyama	2017–2024	273
4	(Japan) Taiki Hirato	2019–2022	208
5	(Japan) Koji Suzuki	2012–2018	187
6	(Japan) Takafumi Suzuki	2010–2012, 2014–2016	184
7	(Japan) Kota Morimura	2015–2020	182
8	(North Korea) Ri Han-jae	2014–2020	148
9	(Japan) Toshiyasu Takahara	2014–2018	147
10	(Japan) Kai Miki	2021–2024	144

Top 10 all-time goalscorer
Rank	Player	Club appearance	Total goals
1	(Japan) Koji Suzuki	187	69
2	(Japan) Yoshinori Katsumata	103	54
3	(Japan) Yuki Nakashima	287	51
4	(Japan) Takafumi Suzuki	184	42
5	(Japan) Taiki Hirato	208	40
6	(Japan) Shōta Fujio	126	27
7	(Brazil) Erik	69	26
8	(Japan) Shusuke Ota	79	20
8	(Australia) Mitchell Duke	110	20
10	(Japan) Yūki Sōma	66	19

- Biggest wins: 11–0 vs T.F.S.C. (20 May 2007)
- Heaviest defeats: 1–7 vs Urawa Red Diamonds (11 November 2015)
- Youngest goal scorers: Shota Saito ~ 18 years 11 months 25 days old (On 9 June 2013 vs Honda FC)
- Oldest goal scorers: Yuki Nakashima ~ 40 years 3 months 19 days old (On 5 October 2024 vs Kawasaki Frontale)
- Youngest ever debutant: Ryu Joseph Hashimura ~ 16 years 6 months 17 days old (On 12 March 2017 vs Fagiano Okayama)
- Oldest ever player: Yuki Nakashima ~ 40 years 4 months 24 days old (On 9 November 2024 vs FC Tokyo)

=== Continental record ===
Competition	Pld	W	D	L	GF	GA	GD	Win%
AFC Champions League Elite	13	8	3	2	18	8	+10	61.54
AFC Champions League Two	4	4	0	0	6	1	+5	100.00
Total	17	12	3	2	24	9	+15	70.59

Season	Competition	Round	Club	Home	Away	Aggregate
2025–26	AFC Champions League Elite	League stage	(South Korea) FC Seoul	1–1	—N/a	1st out of 12
2025–26	AFC Champions League Elite	League stage	(Malaysia) Johor Darul Ta'zim	—N/a	0–0	1st out of 12
2025–26	AFC Champions League Elite	League stage	(China) Shanghai Port	—N/a	2–0	1st out of 12
2025–26	AFC Champions League Elite	League stage	(Australia) Melbourne City	1–2	—N/a	1st out of 12
2025–26	AFC Champions League Elite	League stage	(South Korea) Gangwon	—N/a	3–1	1st out of 12
2025–26	AFC Champions League Elite	League stage	(South Korea) Ulsan HD	3–1	—N/a	1st out of 12
2025–26	AFC Champions League Elite	League stage	(China) Shanghai Shenhua	—N/a	2–0	1st out of 12
2025–26	AFC Champions League Elite	League stage	(China) Chengdu Rongcheng	3–2	—N/a	1st out of 12
2025–26	AFC Champions League Elite	Round of 16	(South Korea) Gangwon	1–0	0–0	1–0
2025–26	AFC Champions League Elite	Quarter-final	(Saudi Arabia) Al-Ittihad Jeddah	1–0		
2025–26	AFC Champions League Elite	Semi-final	(United Arab Emirates) Shabab Al-Ahli Dubai	1–0		
2025–26	AFC Champions League Elite	Final	(Saudi Arabia) Al-Ahli Saudi	0–1 (a.e.t.)		
2026–27	AFC Champions League Two	Group G	(Cambodia) PKR Svay Rieng	2–0		
2026–27	AFC Champions League Two	Group G	(Singapore) Tampines Rovers		1–0	
2026–27	AFC Champions League Two	Group G	(China) Shanghai Shenhua	2–1	1–0	

== Award winners ==
As of the end of the 2025 season.

J.League Best XI

J1 League

- (Japan) Yūki Sōma (2025)

J2 League

- (Brazil) Erik (2023)

== Managerial history ==
Manager	Period	Honours
(Japan) Sadao Shigeta	1991–1995	
(Japan) Shoji Komoda	1996–2002	
(Japan) Minoru Moriya	2003–2007	– 2006 Kanto Soccer League Division 2 – 2007 Kanto Soccer League Division 1
(Japan) Tetsuya Totsuka	1 February 2008–31 January 2010	– 2008 Japanese Regional Football Champions League
(Japan) Naoki Soma	1 February 2010–31 January 2011	
(Serbia) Ranko Popović	1 February 2011–31 January 2012	
(Argentina) Osvaldo Ardiles	1 February 2012–17 November 2012	
(Japan) Yutaka Akita	26 November 2012–25 June 2013	
(Japan) Naoki Kusunose	25 June 2013–31 January 2014	
(Japan) Naoki Soma (2)	1 February 2014–31 January 2020	
(Serbia) Ranko Popović (2)	1 February 2020–31 January 2023	
(Japan) Go Kuroda	1 February 2023–present	– 2023 J2 League – 2025 Emperor's Cup

== Season by season record ==
Champions	Runners-up	Third place	Promoted	Relegated

Season	Div.	Tier	Teams	Pos.	P	W	D	L	F	A	GD	Pts	Attendance/G	J. League Cup	Emperor's Cup	ACL Elite
2009	JFL	3	18	6th	34	14	12	8	38	30	8	54	1,886	Not eligible	–	—
2010	JFL	3	18	3rd	34	19	4	11	71	44	27	61	3,503	Not eligible	3rd round	—
2011	JFL	3	18	3rd	33	18	7	8	61	28	33	61	3,515	Not eligible	2nd round	—
2012	J2	2	22	22nd	42	7	11	24	34	67	-33	32	3,627	Not eligible	4th round	—
2013	JFL	3	18	4th	34	18	7	9	51	44	7	61	3,174	Not eligible	–	—
2014	J3	3	12	3rd	33	20	8	5	59	23	37	68	3,134	Not eligible	–	—
2015	J3	3	13	2nd	36	23	9	4	52	18	34	78	3,766	Not eligible	4th round	—
2016	J2	2	22	7th	42	18	11	13	53	44	9	65	5,123	Not eligible	1st round	—
2017	J2	2	22	16th	42	11	17	14	53	53	0	50	4,056	Not eligible	2nd round	—
2018	J2	2	22	4th	42	21	13	8	62	44	18	76	4,915	Not eligible	3rd round	—
2019	J2	2	22	18th	42	9	16	17	36	59	-23	43	4,718	Not eligible	2nd round	—
2020 †	J2	2	22	19th	42	12	13	17	41	52	-11	49	1,302	Not eligible	Did not qualify	—
2021 †	J2	2	22	5th	42	20	12	10	64	38	26	72	2,577	Not eligible	2nd round	—
2022	J2	2	22	15th	42	14	9	19	51	50	1	51	3,243	Not eligible	2nd round	—
2023	J2	2	22	1st	42	26	9	7	79	35	44	87	7,426	Not eligible	Round of 16	—
2024	J1	1	20	3rd	38	19	9	10	54	34	20	68	17,610	Quarter-finals	2nd round	—
2025	J1	1	20	6th	38	17	9	12	52	38	14	60	14,018	3rd round	Winners	Runner-up
2026	J1	1	10	TBD	18									N/A	N/A	
2026–27	J1	1	20	TBD	38									TBD	TBD	

Key

- Pos. = Position in league; P = Games played; W = Games won; D = Games drawn; L = Games lost; F = Goals scored; A = Goals conceded; GD = Goals difference; Pts = Points gained
- Attendance/G = Average home league attendance
- † 2020 & 2021 seasons attendances reduced by COVID-19 worldwide pandemic
- Source: J. League Data Site
