= List of J2 League transfers winter 2016–17 =

This is a list of Japanese football J2 League transfers in the winter transfer window 2016–17 by club.

== Nagoya Grampus ==
In: Note: Flags indicate national team as defined under FIFA eligibility rules; some limited exceptions apply. Players may hold more than one non-FIFA nationality.

No.	Pos.	Nation	Player
3	DF	JPN	Kazuki Kushibiki (from (Japan) Consadole Sapporo)
4	DF	BRA	Charles (from (Brazil) Ceará)
8	MF	BRA	Washington (from (Brazil) Brasil de Pelotas)
10	FW	BRA	Felipe Garcia (from (Brazil) Brasil de Pelotas)
11	FW	JPN	Hisato Satō (from (Japan) Sanfrecce Hiroshima)
15	DF	JPN	Kazuya Miyahara (from (Japan) Sanfrecce Hiroshima)
17	MF	JPN	Yuki Kobayashi (from (Japan) Albirex Niigata)
18	GK	JPN	Tsubasa Shibuya (from (Japan) Yokohama)
19	FW	JPN	Yuki Oshitani (from (Japan) Fagiano Okayama)
21	MF	JPN	Kohei Hattanda (from (Japan) Shimizu S-Pulse)
25	MF	JPN	Ryuji Sugimoto (from (Japan) Tokyo Verdy)
28	FW	JPN	Keiji Tamada (from (Japan) Cerezo Osaka)
38	FW	JPN	Ryo Nagai (from (Japan) V-Varen Nagasaki)
39	MF	JPN	Kenta Uchida (from (Japan) Ehime)

Out: Note: Flags indicate national team as defined under FIFA eligibility rules; some limited exceptions apply. Players may hold more than one non-FIFA nationality.

No.	Pos.	Nation	Player
2	DF	JPN	Akira Takeuchi (to (Japan) Oita Trinita)
4	DF	JPN	Tulio (to (Japan) Kyoto Sanga)
8	MF	KOR	Ha Dae-sung (loan return to (Japan) FC Tokyo)
10	MF	JPN	Yoshizumi Ogawa (to (Japan) Sagan Tosu)
11	FW	JPN	Kensuke Nagai (to (Japan) Tokyo)
15	MF	KOR	Lee Seung-hee (to (South Korea) Pohang Steelers)
17	MF	JPN	Tomokazu Myojin (to (Japan) AC Nagano Parceiro)
18	FW	JPN	Ryunosuke Noda (to (Japan) Shonan Bellmare)
19	FW	JPN	Kisho Yano (to (Japan) Albirex Niigata)
21	GK	JPN	Koji Nishimura (Retired)
22	FW	JPN	Tomoya Koyamatsu (to (Japan) Kyoto Sanga)
26	MF	JPN	Yuto Mori (to (Japan) Gamba Osaka)
31	MF	JPN	Takahiro Ogihara (to (Japan) Yokohama F. Marinos)
32	FW	JPN	Kengo Kawamata (to (Japan) Júbilo Iwata)
34	FW	BRA	Gustavo (to (Japan) Roasso Kumamoto)
38	MF	JPN	Riki Matsuda (to (Japan) Avispa Fukuoka)
—	GK	JPN	Masataka Nomura (to (Japan) Roasso Kumamoto, previously on loan to (Japan) Blaublitz Akita)
—	MF	JPN	Reo Mochizuki (to (Japan) Kyoto Sanga, previously on loan to (Japan) Renofa Yamaguchi)

== Shonan Bellmare ==
In: Note: Flags indicate national team as defined under FIFA eligibility rules; some limited exceptions apply. Players may hold more than one non-FIFA nationality.

No.	Pos.	Nation	Player
1	GK	JPN	Yota Akimoto (from (Japan) FC Tokyo)
5	MF	JPN	Hiroki Akino (on loan from (Japan) Kashiwa Reysol)
10	MF	BRA	Chiquinho (on loan from (Brazil) Coimbra EC)
15	FW	JPN	Ryunosuke Noda (from (Japan) Nagoya Grampus)
19	FW	JPN	Genta Omotehara (from (Japan) Ehime FC)
26	FW	JPN	Tsuyoshi Miyaichi (back from (Japan) Gainare Tottori, previously on loan)
27	MF	JPN	Akira Ando (back from (Japan) Zweigen Kanazawa, previously on loan)
28	DF	JPN	Hirokazu Ishihara (promoted from youth ranks)
29	DF	JPN	Daiki Sugioka (from Ichiritsu Funabashi High School)
31	GK	JPN	Masaaki Goto (from Waseda University)

Out: Note: Flags indicate national team as defined under FIFA eligibility rules; some limited exceptions apply. Players may hold more than one non-FIFA nationality.

No.	Pos.	Nation	Player
1	GK	JPN	Tomohiko Murayama (to (Japan) Matsumoto Yamaga)
5	MF	JPN	Tomotaka Okamoto (back to (Japan) Sagan Tosu, previously on loan)
7	FW	JPN	Yohei Otake (to (Japan) Fagiano Okayama)
9	FW	BRA	Thiago Quirino (released)
10	MF	JPN	Daisuke Kikuchi (to (Japan) Urawa Red Diamonds)
15	MF	JPN	Ariajasuru Hasegawa (to (Japan) Omiya Ardija)
19	FW	JPN	Shuhei Otsuki (to (Japan) Vissel Kobe)
21	GK	JPN	Yuji Kajikawa (on loan to (Japan) Tokushima Vortis)
29	FW	BRA	Weslley (back to (Thailand) Burinam United, previously on loan)
33	MF	JPN	Shota Tamura (on loan to (Japan) Fukushima United FC)
37	DF	KOR	Park Tae-hwan (to (Japan) Verspah Oita)
—	DF	JPN	Shota Fukuoka (to (Japan) Tochigi SC)
—	DF	KOR	Kim Jong-pil (to (Japan) Tokushima Vortis, previously on loan at (Japan) Chonburi)
—	MF	JPN	Yuto Misao (to (Japan) Kashima Antlers, previously on loan)

== Avispa Fukuoka ==
In: Note: Flags indicate national team as defined under FIFA eligibility rules; some limited exceptions apply. Players may hold more than one non-FIFA nationality.

No.	Pos.	Nation	Player
3	DF	JPN	Yūichi Komano (from (Japan) FC Tokyo, previously on loan)
8	FW	JPN	Riki Matsuda (from (Japan) Nagoya Grampus)
16	FW	JPN	Daisuke Ishizu (back from (Japan) Vissel Kobe, previously on loan)
21	FW	BRA	Willian Popp (from (South Korea) Busan IPark)
23	GK	JPN	Rikihiro Sugiyama (from (Japan) Shimizu S-Pulse)
29	FW	BRA	Gilsinho (from (Brazil) Atlético Goianiense)
31	GK	JPN	Takumi Yamanoi (from Shizuoka Gakuen High School)
32	FW	JPN	Yusuke Sakimura (promoted from youth ranks)
33	MF	JPN	Koji Yamase (from (Japan) Kyoto Sanga)
36	DF	JPN	Keisuke Iwashita (from (Japan) Gamba Osaka)

Out: Note: Flags indicate national team as defined under FIFA eligibility rules; some limited exceptions apply. Players may hold more than one non-FIFA nationality.

No.	Pos.	Nation	Player
3	DF	JPN	Takumi Abe (to (Japan) Thespakusatsu Gunma)
7	FW	JPN	Takeshi Kanamori (to (Japan) Kashima Antlers)
8	MF	JPN	Shuto Nakahara (to (Japan) Giravanz Kitakyushu)
14	FW	JPN	Shoki Hirai (to (Japan) Giravanz Kitakyushu)
17	DF	JPN	Yu Tamura (on loan to (Japan) Urawa Red Diamonds)
23	GK	KOR	Lee Bum-young (to (South Korea) Gangwon FC)
29	MF	JPN	Kenta Furube (to (Japan) V-Varen Nagasaki)
33	MF	JPN	Jun Suzuki (on loan to (Japan) Oita Trinita)
—	DF	JPN	Yuya Mitsunaga (to (Japan) Roasso Kumamoto, previously on loan at (Japan) Azul Claro Numazu)

== Matsumoto Yamaga ==
In: Note: Flags indicate national team as defined under FIFA eligibility rules; some limited exceptions apply. Players may hold more than one non-FIFA nationality.

No.	Pos.	Nation	Player
1	GK	JPN	Eisuke Fujishima (on loan from (Japan) Sagan Tosu)
2	DF	KOR	Yeo Sung-hye (from (South Korea) Gyeongnam)
8	MF	BRA	Serginho (from (Brazil) Ceará)
9	FW	JPN	Hiroyuki Takasaki (from (Japan) Kashima Antlers, previously on loan)
16	GK	JPN	Tomohiko Murayama (from (Japan) Shonan Bellmare)
17	DF	BRA	Diego (on loan from (Brazil) Joinville)
22	DF	JPN	Kenta Hoshihara (from (Japan) Giravanz Kitakyushu)
23	MF	JPN	Tomotaka Okamoto (from (Japan) Sagan Tosu)
26	FW	JPN	Yoshiki Oka (from Momoyama Gakuin University)
28	DF	JPN	Kenshiro Tanioku (back from (Japan) Azul Claro Numazu, previously on loan)
30	GK	KOR	Goh Dong-min (from Daeryun High School)
31	DF	JPN	Yuya Hashiuchi (from (Japan) Tokushima Vortis)

Out: Note: Flags indicate national team as defined under FIFA eligibility rules; some limited exceptions apply. Players may hold more than one non-FIFA nationality.

No.	Pos.	Nation	Player
1	GK	USA	Daniel Schmidt (back to (Japan) Vegalta Sendai, previously on loan)
8	FW	BRA	Willians (from (Brazil) Atlético Goiainiense)
9	FW	BRA	Obina (released)
11	MF	JPN	Kohei Kiyama (to (Japan) Fagiano Okayama)
16	DF	JPN	Hiroshi Tetsuto (retired)
17	MF	JPN	Ryutaro Iio (to (Japan) V-Varen Nagasaki)
25	GK	JPN	Yuto Shirai (to (Japan) Zweigen Kanazawa)
26	FW	KOR	Han Seung-hyeong (on loan to (Japan) Kataller Toyama)
35	GK	JPN	Niall Killoran (released)
38	FW	JPN	Daizen Maeda (on loan to (Japan) Mito HollyHock)
41	FW	JPN	Daiki Yagishita (to (Japan) Kataller Toyama)
—	MF	JPN	Kohei Kurata (to (Japan) Azul Claro Numazu, previously on loan)
—	MF	JPN	Junto Matsushita (retired, previously on loan at (Japan) Machida Zelvia)
—	MF	JPN	Hayato Michiue (to (Japan) Veertien Mie, previously on loan at (Japan) Azul Claro Numazu)
—	MF	JPN	Nobuyuki Shiina (to (Japan) Kataller Toyama, previously on loan)

== Kyoto Sanga FC ==
In: Note: Flags indicate national team as defined under FIFA eligibility rules; some limited exceptions apply. Players may hold more than one non-FIFA nationality.

No.	Pos.	Nation	Player
2	DF	JPN	Masato Yuzawa (on loan from (Japan) Kashiwa Reysol)
4	DF	JPN	Tulio (from (Japan) Nagoya Grampus)
8	MF	KOR	Ha Sung-min (from (South Korea) Ulsan Hyundai)
9	FW	BEL	Kevin Oris (from (South Korea) Incheon United)
13	FW	JPN	Yuto Iwasaki (from Kyoto Tachibana High School)
14	MF	JPN	Keiya Sento (from Toyo University)
18	MF	JPN	Reo Mochizuki (from (Japan) Nagoya Grampus)
19	FW	JPN	Yohei Ono (from Kyoto Tachibana High School)
20	MF	JPN	Shun Ito (from (Japan) Montedio Yamagata)
22	MF	JPN	Tomoya Koyamatsu (from (Japan) Nagoya Grampus)
23	MF	JPN	Takuya Shimamura (promoted from youth ranks)
25	DF	JPN	Shogo Asada (promoted from youth ranks)
29	GK	JPN	Tatsunari Nagai (from (Japan) Roasso Kumamoto)
31	FW	JPN	Masashi Oguro (back from (Japan) Montedio Yamagata, previously on loan)

Out: Note: Flags indicate national team as defined under FIFA eligibility rules; some limited exceptions apply. Players may hold more than one non-FIFA nationality.

No.	Pos.	Nation	Player
2	DF	JPN	Shunya Suganuma (to (Japan) Montedio Yamagata)
5	MF	JPN	Shunsuke Iwanuma (to (Japan) Nagano Parceiro)
8	MF	BRA	Andrei Girotto (back to (Brazil) Palmeiras, previously on loan)
9	FW	BRA	Daniel Lovinho (released)
11	MF	JPN	Yuki Horigome (to (Japan) Ventforet Kofu)
14	MF	JPN	Koji Yamase (to (Japan) Avispa Fukuoka)
17	FW	JPN	Koki Arita (to (Japan) Ehime FC)
19	FW	JPN	Takuro Yajima (retired)
22	MF	JPN	Kentaro Sato (released)
23	MF	JPN	Atsuki Wada (released)
25	MF	JPN	Ippei Kokuryo (to (Japan) Nagano Parceiro)
27	MF	JPN	Yushi Nagashima (on loan to (Japan) FC Gifu)
28	DF	JPN	Ryusei Saito (on loan to (Japan) Mito HollyHock)
29	FW	JPN	Daiki Numa (on loan to (Japan) Gainare Tottori)
33	GK	JPN	Genki Yamada (on loan to (Japan) Renofa Yamaguchi)
36	FW	BRA	Kiros (to (Brazil) Resende)
—	GK	JPN	Daichi Sugimoto (to (Japan) Yokohama F. Marinos, previously on loan at (Japan) Tokushima Vortis)
—	FW	JPN	Masatoshi Ishida (on loan to (Japan) Thespakusatsu Gunma, previously on loan at (Japan) SC Sagamihara)
—	FW	JPN	Kazuki Mine (to (Japan) Vanraure Hachinohe)

== Fagiano Okayama ==
In: Note: Flags indicate national team as defined under FIFA eligibility rules; some limited exceptions apply. Players may hold more than one non-FIFA nationality.

No.	Pos.	Nation	Player
8	MF	JPN	Hideki Ishige (on loan from (Japan) Shimizu S-Pulse)
10	FW	JPN	Yohei Otake (from (Japan) Shonan Bellmare)
13	GK	JPN	Masatoshi Kushibiki (on loan from (Japan) Shimizu S-Pulse)
14	MF	JPN	Kohei Kiyama (from (Japan) Matsumoto Yamaga)
17	MF	KOR	Park Hyung-jin (from (Japan) V-Varen Nagasaki)
22	GK	JPN	Jun Ichimori (from (Japan) Renofa Yamaguchi)
24	FW	JPN	Shingo Akamine (from (Japan) Gamba Osaka, previously on loan)
25	MF	JPN	Shohei Takeda (from Kanagawa University)
27	DF	JPN	Koki Tsukagawa (from Ryutsu Keizai University)
29	GK	JPN	Kota Nitadori (back from (Japan) Yokohama FC, previously on loan)
31	DF	JPN	Shimoguchi Wakaba (from JFA Academy Fukushima)
33	DF	KOR	Jang Suk-won (from (South Korea) Seongnam)
34	FW	JPN	Ryuta Ishikawa (promoted from youth ranks)

Out: Note: Flags indicate national team as defined under FIFA eligibility rules; some limited exceptions apply. Players may hold more than one non-FIFA nationality.

No.	Pos.	Nation	Player
1	GK	JPN	Hirotsugu Nakabayashi (to (Japan) Sanfrecce Hiroshima)
10	MF	JPN	Shinya Yajima (to (Japan) Urawa Red Diamonds, back from loan)
14	FW	JPN	Yuki Oshitani (to (Japan) Nagoya Grampus)
17	MF	JPN	Yuzuru Shimada (to (Japan) V-Varen Nagasaki)
18	MF	JPN	Taisuke Akiyoshi (back to (Japan) Ventforet Kofu, previously on loan)
23	MF	JPN	Noriyoshi Sakai (back to (Japan) Albirex Niigata, previously on loan)
29	GK	JPN	Shuhei Matsubara (to (Japan) Kamatamare Sanuki)
33	DF	KOR	Kim Jin-kyu (released)
34	DF	JPN	Yuki Tanaka (retired)
35	DF	JPN	Daiki Iwamasa (to (Japan) Tokyo United FC)
36	DF	JPN	Naoto Kidoku (to (Japan) SC Sagamihara)
—	GK	JPN	Tadashi Kiwada (on loan to (Japan) Vanraure Hachinohe)
—	DF	JPN	Yoshitatsu Itano (to (Japan) Tokyo 23 F.C.)
—	DF	JPN	Yasuaki Yamashita (released)
—	DF	JPN	Naoki Nishiyabashi (to (Japan) Mitsubishi Motors Mizushima FC)
—	DF	JPN	Koshi Miyagawa (released)
—	DF	JPN	Mikiharu Miyamoto (retired)
—	DF	JPN	Kento Sasaki (to (Japan) MIO Biwako Shiga)
—	DF	JPN	(retired)
—	DF	JPN	Koki Yamashita (to (Japan) Iwaki FC)
—	MF	JPN	Kazuki Chibu (to (Japan) Verspah Oita)
—	MF	JPN	Ryobu Watanabe (released)
—	FW	JPN	Kosuke Fujioka (released)
—	FW	JPN	Kwon Roan (released)
—	FW	JPN	Hideya Okamoto (to (Japan) Renofa Yamaguchi, previously on loan)
—	FW	JPN	Hidemasa Kobayashi (to (Japan) Nagano Parceiro)
—	FW	JPN	Yuichi Kubo (to (Japan) SC Sagamihara, previously on loan at (Japan) Mito HollyHock)

== Machida Zelvia ==
In: Note: Flags indicate national team as defined under FIFA eligibility rules; some limited exceptions apply. Players may hold more than one non-FIFA nationality.

No.	Pos.	Nation	Player
1	GK	JPN	Kempei Usui (on loan from (Japan) Shimizu S-Pulse)
2	DF	JPN	Masayuki Okuyama (from (Japan) Renofa Yamaguchi)
3	DF	JPN	Kodai Fujii (from (Japan) Kamatamare Sanuki)
4	DF	MNE	Boris Tatar (from (Finland) F.C. Lahti)
8	MF	JPN	Tatsuya Yazawa (from (Japan) JEF United Chiba, previously on loan)
13	DF	JPN	Shunsuke Ota (from Ritsumeikan University)
14	MF	JPN	Shohei Yokoyama (from (Japan) Thespakusatsu Gunma, previously on loan)
17	FW	JPN	Junki Endo (from (Japan) FC Gifu)
18	MF	JPN	Taiki Hirato (on loan from (Japan) Kashima Antlers)
31	GK	JPN	Kenta Watanabe (from Gamba Osaka Youth)

Out: Note: Flags indicate national team as defined under FIFA eligibility rules; some limited exceptions apply. Players may hold more than one non-FIFA nationality.

No.	Pos.	Nation	Player
1	GK	JPN	Keisuke Naito (to (Japan) Tokyo Verdy)
3	DF	JPN	Shinnosuke Hatanaka (back to (Japan) Tokyo Verdy, previously on loan)
13	MF	JPN	Ryuto Otake (to (Japan) Fujieda MYFC)
16	DF	JPN	Shingo Arizono (to (Japan) Blaublitz Akita)
17	MF	JPN	Takafumi Suzuki (to (Japan) Thespakusatsu Gunma)
18	MF	JPN	Taisuke Miyazaki (to (Japan) Tochigi SC, previously on loan)
19	MF	JPN	Teruhito Nakagawa (back to (Japan) Yokohama F. Marinos, previously on loan)
20	MF	JPN	Junto Matsushita (back to (Japan) Matsumoto Yamaga, previously on loan)
22	GK	JPN	Kyohei Shimazaki (to (Japan) FC Kariya)
27	DF	JPN	Tomoya Fukuda (on loan to (Japan) Grulla Morioka)
37	DF	NED	Calvin Jong-A-Pin (to (Japan) Yokohama FC)
38	FW	JPN	Satoshi Kukino (retired)
—	GK	JPN	Sota Chiba (to (Japan) Sarcos Fukui, previously on loan)
—	MF	JPN	Takuya Kakine (to (Japan) Grulla Morioka, previously on loan)
—	MF	JPN	Yuta Inagaki (to (Japan) MIO Biwako Shiga, previously on loan)
—	FW	JPN	Shota Saito (to (Japan) Tokyo 23 FC, previously on loan)
—	FW	JPN	Keisuke Endo (to (Japan) Fujieda MYFC, previously on loan)

== Yokohama FC ==
In: Note: Flags indicate national team as defined under FIFA eligibility rules; some limited exceptions apply. Players may hold more than one non-FIFA nationality.

No.	Pos.	Nation	Player
4	DF	JPN	Masaki Watanabe (from (Japan) Ventforet Kofu)
15	FW	JPN	Yuki Nakayama (from Waseda University)
16	DF	JPN	Jumpei Arai (from Waseda University)
19	MF	KOR	Jeong Chung-geun (from (France) FC Nantes)
20	DF	NED	Calvin Jong-A-Pin (from (Japan) Machida Zelvia)
21	MF	JPN	Asahi Masuyama (on loan from (Japan) Vissel Kobe)
25	MF	JPN	Keita Ishii (back from (Japan) Grulla Morioka, previously on loan)
26	GK	JPN	Akinori Ichikawa (from Seisa Kokusai Shonan High School)
29	MF	JPN	Ryotaro Yamamoto (promoted from youth ranks)
30	DF	JPN	Takanobu Komiyama (from (Japan) Kawasaki Frontale)

Out: Note: Flags indicate national team as defined under FIFA eligibility rules; some limited exceptions apply. Players may hold more than one non-FIFA nationality.

No.	Pos.	Nation	Player
1	GK	JPN	Tsubasa Shibuya (to (Japan) Nagoya Grampus)
7	MF	JPN	Tomoya Uchida (to (Hong Kong) Southern District FC)
15	DF	JPN	Atsushi Ichimura (to (Japan) Kamatamare Sanuki)
17	MF	PRK	An Yong-hak (released)
19	MF	JPN	Kosuke Onose (to (Japan) Renofa Yamaguchi)
20	MF	JPN	Reo Osaki (to (Japan) Tokushima Vortis)
24	MF	JPN	Toshihiro Matsushita (to (Japan) Kagoshima United FC)
20	MF	SLO	Rok Straus (released)
32	MF	VIE	Nguyễn Tuấn Anh (back to (Vietnam) Hoàng Anh Gia Lai F.C., previously on loan)
36	GK	JPN	Kota Nitadori (back to (Japan) Fagiano Okayama, previously on loan)

== Tokushima Vortis ==
In: Note: Flags indicate national team as defined under FIFA eligibility rules; some limited exceptions apply. Players may hold more than one non-FIFA nationality.

No.	Pos.	Nation	Player
2	DF	SRB	Nikola Vasiljević (from (Romania) Pandurii Târgu Jiu)
3	MF	JPN	Reo Osaki (from (Japan) Yokohama FC)
9	FW	SRB	Nikola Ašćerić (from (Serbia) FK Vojvodina)
11	MF	JPN	Yatsunori Shimaya (from (Japan) Renofa Yamaguchi)
17	FW	JPN	Ryogo Yamasaki (from (Japan) Sagan Tosu, previously on loan)
20	DF	KOR	Kim Jong-pil (from (Japan) Shonan Bellmare)
21	GK	JPN	Yuji Kajikawa (on loan from (Japan) Shonan Bellmare)
24	FW	JPN	Chie Edoojon Kawakami (from Urawa Red Diamonds Youth)
26	MF	JPN	Taro Sugimoto (on loan from (Japan) Kashima Antlers)
27	DF	JPN	Kazuaki Mawatari (from (Japan) Zweigen Kanazawa)
29	GK	JPN	Koki Matsuzawa (from (Japan) Vissel Kobe)
32	FW	JPN	Yudai Konishi (from Gamba Osaka Youth)

Out: Note: Flags indicate national team as defined under FIFA eligibility rules; some limited exceptions apply. Players may hold more than one non-FIFA nationality.

No.	Pos.	Nation	Player
2	DF	JPN	Yohei Fukumoto (to (Japan) Renofa Yamaguchi)
3	MF	BRA	Alex (released)
8	MF	KOR	Kim Kyung-jung (to (South Korea) Gangwon FC)
13	FW	JPN	Ikki Sasaki (to (Japan) Kataller Toyama)
20	FW	CMR	Achille Emana (to (Spain) Gimnàstic de Tarragona)
21	GK	JPN	Yasuhiro Watanabe (back to (Japan) Albirex Niigata, previously on loan)
24	MF	JPN	Yoji Sasaki (on loan to (Japan) Kataller Toyama)
26	DF	JPN	Yuya Hashiuchi (to (Japan) Matsumoto Yamaga)
29	GK	JPN	Daichi Sugimoto (back to (Japan) Kyoto Sanga, previously on loan)

== Ehime FC ==
In: Note: Flags indicate national team as defined under FIFA eligibility rules; some limited exceptions apply. Players may hold more than one non-FIFA nationality.

No.	Pos.	Nation	Player
9	FW	JPN	Koki Arita (from (Japan) Kyoto Sanga)
11	MF	JPN	Yumemi Kanda (from (Japan) Hokkaido Consadole Sapporo)
15	FW	JPN	Shion Niwa (from (Japan) Meiji University)
16	MF	JPN	Hiroto Tanaka (on loan from (Japan) Júbilo Iwata)
17	MF	JPN	Daiki Kogure (from (Japan) Cerezo Osaka)
19	DF	JPN	Shuhei Hotta (from (Japan) Blaublitz Akita)
21	GK	JPN	Hiroki Mawatari (from (Japan) National Institute of Fitness & Sports Kanoya)
37	GK	JPN	Yutaro Hara (from (Japan) Roasso Kumamoto, previously on loan)
41	MF	JPN	Junki Koike (on loan from (Japan) JEF United Chiba)

Out: Note: Flags indicate national team as defined under FIFA eligibility rules; some limited exceptions apply. Players may hold more than one non-FIFA nationality.

No.	Pos.	Nation	Player
1	GK	JPN	Tsuyoshi Kodama (to (Japan) Montedio Yamagata)
10	FW	JPN	Yuji Senuma (back to (Japan) Shimizu S-Pulse, previously on loan)
11	FW	JPN	Genta Omotehara (to (Japan) Shonan Bellmare)
15	DF	JPN	Rikiya Motegi (back to (Japan) Urawa Red Diamonds, previously on loan)
16	MF	JPN	Nao Eguchi (from (Japan) Blaublitz Akita)
17	MF	JPN	Toyofumi Sakano (back to (Japan) Urawa Red Diamonds, previously on loan)
21	GK	JPN	Yuya Hikichi (to (Japan) Suzuka Unlimited FC)
25	DF	KOR	Park Chan-yong (to (Japan) Renofa Yamaguchi)
26	MF	JPN	Naoya Fuji (retired)
31	GK	JPN	Shogo Onishi (to (Japan) Azul Claro Numazu)
36	MF	PRK	Park Kwang-il (released)
39	MF	JPN	Kenta Uchida (to (Japan) Nagoya Grampus)
—	FW	JPN	Ryota Watanabe (to (Japan) Azul Claro Numazu, previously on loan at (Japan) Nagano Parceiro)

== JEF United Chiba ==
In: Note: Flags indicate national team as defined under FIFA eligibility rules; some limited exceptions apply. Players may hold more than one non-FIFA nationality.

No.	Pos.	Nation	Player
8	MF	JPN	Koki Kiyotake (from (Japan) Sagan Tosu)
9	FW	ARG	Joaquin Larrivey (from (United Arab Emirates) Baniyas)
14	MF	JPN	Andrew Kumagai (on loan from (Japan) Yokohama F. Marinos)
21	MF	PAR	Jorge Salinas (from (Paraguay) Olimpia)
22	MF	JPN	Naotake Hanyu (from (Japan) FC Tokyo)
29	GK	JPN	Kaito Yamamoto (from (Japan) Vissel Kobe)
30	DF	JPN	Yushi Mizubochi (from (Japan) Keio University)
32	MF	JPN	Issei Takahashi (from Aomori Yamada High School)
33	DF	JPN	Takaharu Nishino (on loan from (Japan) Gamba Osaka)

Out: Note: Flags indicate national team as defined under FIFA eligibility rules; some limited exceptions apply. Players may hold more than one non-FIFA nationality.

No.	Pos.	Nation	Player
8	MF	JPN	Haruya Ide (from (Japan) Gamba Osaka)
9	FW	BRA	Élton (to (Brazil) Corinthians)
10	MF	JPN	Kazuki Nagasawa (to (Japan) Urawa Red Diamonds, previously on loan)
15	DF	JPN	Seitaro Tomisawa (to (Japan) Albirex Niigata)
16	MF	JPN	Junki Koike (on loan to (Japan) Ehime FC)
19	FW	JPN	Ado Onaiwu (to (Japan) Urawa Red Diamonds)
21	GK	JPN	Eisuke Fujishima (back to Sagan Tosu, previously on loan)
29	DF	JPN	Itsuki Urata (on loan to (Japan) Giravanz Kitakyushu)
33	DF	JPN	Ryuhei Niwa (back to Sagan Tosu, previously on loan)
—	MF	JPN	Kyoga Nakamura (to (Japan) YSCC, previously on loan at (Japan) FC Ryukyu)
—	MF	JPN	Tatsuya Yazawa (to (Japan) Machida Zelvia, previously on loan)

== Renofa Yamaguchi ==
In: Note: Flags indicate national team as defined under FIFA eligibility rules; some limited exceptions apply. Players may hold more than one non-FIFA nationality.

No.	Pos.	Nation	Player
3	DF	JPN	Kodai Watanabe (from (Japan) Montedio Yamagata)
4	DF	JPN	Yohei Fukumoto (from (Japan) Tokushima Vortis)
6	MF	JPN	Takayuki Mae (on loan from (Japan) Hokkaido Consadole Sapporo)
7	FW	JPN	Hideya Okamoto (from (Japan) Fagiano Okayama, previously on loan)
8	MF	JPN	Kosuke Onose (from (Japan) Yokohama FC)
13	FW	JPN	Rei Yonezawa (on loan from (Japan) Cerezo Osaka)
14	MF	JPN	Issei Takayanagi (from (Japan) Roasso Kumamoto)
15	MF	JPN	Joji Ikegami (from Osaka University of Health and Sport Sciences)
16	DF	KOR	Park Chan-yong (from (Japan) Ehime FC)
20	MF	JPN	Takeru Kiyonaga (from Kansai University)
22	FW	JPN	Masashi Wada (on loan from (Japan) Yokohama F. Marinos)
27	FW	JPN	Tsugutoshi Oishi (from (Japan) Tochigi SC)
42	GK	JPN	Daisuke Yoshimitsu (from (Japan) Tochigi SC)
33	GK	JPN	Genki Yamada (on loan from (Japan) Kyoto Sanga)
40	MF	JPN	Kazuki Kozuka (on loan from (Japan) Albirex Niigata)

Out: Note: Flags indicate national team as defined under FIFA eligibility rules; some limited exceptions apply. Players may hold more than one non-FIFA nationality.

No.	Pos.	Nation	Player
1	GK	JPN	Jun Ichimori (to (Japan) Fagiano Okayama)
4	DF	JPN	Ryuta Koike (to (Japan) Kashiwa Reysol)
5	DF	JPN	Kyohei Kuroki (to (Japan) Oita Trinita)
6	MF	JPN	Reo Mochizuki (back to (Japan) Nagoya Grampus, previously on loan)
7	MF	JPN	Takaki Fukimitsu (to (Japan) Cerezo Osaka)
8	MF	JPN	Yatsunori Shimaya (to (Japan) Tokushima Vortis)
10	MF	JPN	Yoshihiro Shoji (to (Japan) FC Gifu)
13	MF	JPN	Naoto Ando (to (Japan) Tochigi SC)
14	DF	JPN	Ryoji Fukui (to (Japan) Mito HollyHock, previously on loan)
15	MF	JPN	Shuto Kono (back to (Japan) FC Tokyo, previously on loan)
16	GK	JPN	Nobushige Tabata (retired])
18	FW	JPN	Takuto Haraguchi (to (Japan) Gainare Tottori)
22	DF	KOR	Yoon Shin-young (to (South Korea) Daejon Citizen)
24	MF	JPN	Hirohito Shinohara (to (Japan) Fujieda MYFC)
26	MF	ARG	Luciano Romero (released)
32	FW	JPN	Masato Nakayama (to (Japan) Montedio Yamagata)
33	DF	JPN	Fumitaka Kitakani (back to (Japan) Yokohama F. Marinos, previously on loan)
34	DF	JPN	Masayuki Okuyama (to (Japan) Machida Zelvia)
39	MF	JPN	Kiyohiro Hirabayashi (retired)
—	DF	JPN	Keita Furusawa (to (Japan) Tokyo Musashino City FC, previously on loan)
—	MF	JPN	Toshio Shimakawa (to (Japan) Ventforet Kofu, previously on loan at (Japan) Tochigi SC)

== Mito HollyHock ==
In: Note: Flags indicate national team as defined under FIFA eligibility rules; some limited exceptions apply. Players may hold more than one non-FIFA nationality.

No.	Pos.	Nation	Player
8	FW	JPN	Ryohei Hayashi (from (Japan) Montedio Yamagata)
13	MF	JPN	Keita Tanaka (from (Japan) FC Ryukyu)
15	FW	JPN	Taisei Kadoguchi (back from (Japan) Suzuka Unlimited FC, previously on loan)
22	MF	JPN	Yosuke Nakagawa (promoted from youth ranks)
23	GK	JPN	Akihisa Okada (back from (Japan) Suzuka Unlimited FC, previously on loan)
25	DF	JPN	Takuma Hamasaki (from (Japan) FC Osaka)
26	MF	JPN	Masato Kojima (on loan from (Japan) Omiya Ardija)
27	MF	JPN	Shota Saito (on loan from (Japan) Urawa Red Diamonds)
30	MF	JPN	Ryo Toyama (from Hannan University)
31	DF	KOR	Kwon Young-jin (from (South Korea) Gangneung City FC)
32	DF	JPN	Paulão (on loan from (Japan) Hokkaido Consadole Sapporo)
33	DF	JPN	Ryoji Fukui (from (Japan) Renofa Yamaguchi, previously on loan)
35	DF	JPN	Ryusei Saito (on loan from (Japan) Kyoto Sanga)
38	FW	JPN	Daizen Maeda (on loan from (Japan) Matsumoto Yamaga)

Out: Note: Flags indicate national team as defined under FIFA eligibility rules; some limited exceptions apply. Players may hold more than one non-FIFA nationality.

No.	Pos.	Nation	Player
4	DF	JPN	Takaaki Kinoshita (on loan to (Japan) Fukushima United FC)
6	DF	JPN	Kosei Ishigami (to (Japan) Gainare Tottori)
7	MF	JPN	Akihiro Hyodo (to (Japan) Ventforet Kofu)
8	MF	PER	Romero Frank (back to (Japan) Albirex Niigata, previously on loan)
13	DF	JPN	Natsuki Mugikura (to (Japan) SC Sagamihara)
28	GK	JPN	Ryo Ishii (on loan to (Japan) Azul Claro Numazu)
30	DF	KOR	Song Ju-hun (back to (Japan) Albirex Niigata, previously on loan)
32	FW	VIE	Nguyễn Công Phượng (back to (Vietnam) Hoàng Anh Gia Lai F.C., previously on loan)
34	FW	JPN	Shu Hiramatsu (back to (Japan) Albirex Niigata, previously on loan)
36	DF	KOR	Yoo Lo-mon (released)
—	MF	JPN	Ryuya Motoda (on loan to Albirex Niigata Singapore)
—	DF	JPN	Takamasa Yamazaki (to (Japan) Vanraure Hachinohe, previously on loan)
—	MF	JPN	Hayato Ikegaya (to (Japan) Gainare Tottori, previously on loan)

== Montedio Yamagata ==
In: Note: Flags indicate national team as defined under FIFA eligibility rules; some limited exceptions apply. Players may hold more than one non-FIFA nationality.

No.	Pos.	Nation	Player
1	GK	JPN	Tsuyoshi Kodama (from (Japan) Ehime FC)
2	DF	JPN	Kenichi Kaga (from (Japan) Urawa Red Diamonds)
8	MF	JPN	Koki Kazama (from (Japan) Giravanz Kitakyushu)
9	FW	JPN	Yuji Senuma (on loan from (Japan) Shimizu S-Pulse)
11	FW	JPN	Toyofumi Sakano (from (Japan) Urawa Red Diamonds)
14	MF	JPN	Takuya Honda (from (Japan) Shimizu S-Pulse)
17	MF	JPN	Shun Nakamura (from (Japan) Thespakusatsu Gunma)
18	MF	JPN	Shuto Minami (from (Japan) Tokyo Verdy)
20	DF	JPN	Rikiya Motegi (on loan from (Japan) Urawa Red Diamonds)
30	DF	JPN	Naruki Takahashi (promoted from youth ranks)
39	FW	JPN	Masato Nakayama (from (Japan) Renofa Yamaguchi)

Out: Note: Flags indicate national team as defined under FIFA eligibility rules; some limited exceptions apply. Players may hold more than one non-FIFA nationality.

No.	Pos.	Nation	Player
1	GK	JPN	Norihiro Yamagishi (on loan to (Japan) Giravanz Kitakyushu)
2	DF	JPN	Masakazu Tashiro (to (Japan) V-Varen Nagasaki)
3	DF	JPN	Kodai Watanabe (to (Japan) Renofa Yamaguchi)
5	MF	BRA	Alceu (released)
8	FW	JPN	Ryohei Hayashi (to (Japan) Mito HollyHock)
9	FW	BRA	Diego Rosa (to (Brazil) EC Bahia)
10	MF	JPN	Shun Ito (to (Japan) Kyoto Sanga)
11	FW	BRA	Diego Souza (to (Brazil) Volta Redonda)
14	MF	JPN	Kohei Higa (retired)
18	MF	JPN	Shota Kawanishi (to (Japan) Oita Trinita)
19	MF	JPN	Takahide Umebachi (back to (Japan) Kashima Antlers, previously on loan)
21	GK	JPN	Hayato Nakamura (released)
33	FW	JPN	Masashi Oguro (back to (Japan) Kyoto Sanga, previously on loan)

== V-Varen Nagasaki ==
In: Note: Flags indicate national team as defined under FIFA eligibility rules; some limited exceptions apply. Players may hold more than one non-FIFA nationality.

No.	Pos.	Nation	Player
1	GK	JPN	Takuya Masuda (on loan from (Japan) Sanfrecce Hiroshima)
2	DF	JPN	Masakazu Tashiro (from (Japan) Montedio Yamagata)
3	MF	JPN	Ryutaro Iio (from (Japan) Matsumoto Yamaga)
7	MF	JPN	Shuto Kono (from (Japan) FC Tokyo)
8	MF	JPN	Yu Kimura (from (Japan) Kashiwa Reysol, previously on loan)
9	FW	ESP	Juanma (from (Scotland) Heart of Midlothian)
11	FW	JPN	Junki Hata (from Tokai Gakuen University)
13	DF	JPN	Daichi Inui (from (Japan) Thespakusatsu Gunma)
15	MF	JPN	Yuzuru Shimada (from (Japan) Fagiano Okayama)
17	MF	JPN	Kenta Furube (from (Japan) Avispa Fukuoka)
18	MF	JPN	Masakazu Yoshioka (from Komazawa University)
19	FW	JPN	Takeshi Sawada (from (Japan) Shimizu S-Pulse)
22	GK	JPN	Tatsuro Okuda (from (Japan) Júbilo Iwata)
23	DF	JPN	Fumitaka Kitatani (from (Japan) Yokohama F. Marinos)
24	MF	JPN	Ryusuke Hayashida (promoted from youth ranks)
28	MF	JPN	Hijiri Onaga (from Chuo University)
29	DF	JPN	Kensuke Fukuda (from (Japan) Ventforet Kofu)

Out: Note: Flags indicate national team as defined under FIFA eligibility rules; some limited exceptions apply. Players may hold more than one non-FIFA nationality.

No.	Pos.	Nation	Player
1	GK	JPN	Takuo Okubo (to (Japan) FC Tokyo)
2	DF	JPN	Tatsuya Sakai (back to (Japan) Sagan Tosu, previously on loan)
3	GK	KOR	Cho Min-woo (to (South Korea) Pohang Steelers)
6	MF	KOR	Lee Yon-jick (to (Japan) Kamatamare Sanuki)
9	FW	JPN	Ryo Nagai (to (Japan) Nagoya Grampus)
11	MF	JPN	Daisuke Kanzaki (to (Japan) Giravanz Kitakyushu)
13	MF	KOR	Park Hyung-jin (to (Japan) Fagiano Okayama)
15	DF	JPN	Shohei Kishida (back to (Japan) Sagan Tosu, previously on loan)
16	MF	JPN	Hiroto Tanaka (back to (Japan) Júbilo Iwata, previously on loan)
18	FW	JPN	Koichi Sato (to (Japan) Zweigen Kanazawa)
23	MF	JPN	Ryota Kajikawa (to (Japan) Tokyo Verdy)
24	MF	JPN	Tatsuya Onodera (on loan to (Japan) Giravanz Kitakyushu)
29	DF	JPN	Taikai Uemoto (to (Japan) Kagoshima United FC)
33	MF	KOR	Baek Sung-dong (back to (Japan) Sagan Tosu, previously on loan)
—	FW	JPN	Yosuke Kamigata (to (Japan) Tochigi SC, previously on loan)
—	FW	BRA	Rodrigo (released, previously on loan at (Japan) Giravanz Kitakyushu)

== Roasso Kumamoto ==
In: Note: Flags indicate national team as defined under FIFA eligibility rules; some limited exceptions apply. Players may hold more than one non-FIFA nationality.

No.	Pos.	Nation	Player
3	DF	KOR	Lim Jin-woo (from (South Korea) Yeungnam University)
9	FW	PRK	An Byong-jun (from (Japan) Kawasaki Frontale)
11	FW	BRA	Gustavo (from (Japan) Nagoya Grampus)
13	DF	JPN	Kai Miki (from (Japan) Machida Zelvia)
14	FW	JPN	Tatsuya Tanaka (back from (Japan) FC Gifu, previously on loan)
16	DF	KOR	Yang Sang-jun (from (South Korea) Hankuk University of Foreign Studies)
20	MF	JPN	Kazumasa Uesato (from (Japan) Hokkaido Consadole Sapporo)
21	GK	JPN	Masataka Nomura (from (Japan) Nagoya Grampus)
23	DF	JPN	Yuki Kotani (on loan from (Japan) Cerezo Osaka, previously on loan)
26	DF	JPN	Yuya Mitsunaga (from (Japan) Avispa Fukuoka)
28	FW	JPN	Shota Hayashi (from Kokushikan University)
32	MF	JPN	Shunsuke Yonehara (promoted from youth ranks)

Out: Note: Flags indicate national team as defined under FIFA eligibility rules; some limited exceptions apply. Players may hold more than one non-FIFA nationality.

No.	Pos.	Nation	Player
5	DF	JPN	Shuto Suzuki (on loan to (Japan) Giravanz Kitakyushu)
8	MF	JPN	Issei Takayanagi (to (Japan) Renofa Yamaguchi)
10	MF	JPN	Koki Kiyotake (back to (Japan) Sagan Tosu, previously on loan)
14	MF	KOR	Kim Tae-hyon (released)
16	MF	JPN	Masanobu Komaki (on loanto (Japan) Azul Claro Numazu)
18	GK	JPN	Tatsunari Nagai (to (Japan) Kyoto Sanga)
21	GK	JPN	Daiki Kanei (released)
23	DF	JPN	Yohei Kurakawa (released)
25	FW	JPN	Takuya Wakasugi (released)
—	GK	JPN	Yutaro Hara (to (Japan) Ehime FC, previously on loan)
—	DF	JPN	Taishin Morikawa (to (Japan) Verspah Oita, previously on loan at (Japan) Fujieda MYFC)

== Thespakusatsu Gunma ==
In: Note: Flags indicate national team as defined under FIFA eligibility rules; some limited exceptions apply. Players may hold more than one non-FIFA nationality.

No.	Pos.	Nation	Player
5	DF	JPN	Takumi Abe (from (Japan) Avispa Fukuoka)
8	MF	JPN	Takafumi Suzuki (from (Japan) Machida Zelvia)
14	FW	JPN	Masatoshi Ishida (on loan from (Japan) Kyoto Sanga)
15	FW	JPN	Shohei Okada (from (Japan) Sagan Tosu)
16	DF	JPN	Keita Ichikawa (from (Japan) Giravanz Kitakyushu)
17	DF	JPN	Masato Fujiwara (from Ryutsu Keizai University)
18	FW	JPN	Kento Kawata (on loan from (Japan) Omiya Ardija)
20	MF	KOR	Park Kun (from (Japan) Nagano Parceiro, previously on loan)
22	MF	JPN	Sho Murata (from (Japan) Briobecca Urayasu)
25	FW	JPN	Takuya Iwata (from Meiji University)
26	MF	JPN	Kazuma Takai (from Nippon Sport Science University)
27	MF	JPN	Daiki Deoka (from Kwansei Gakuin University)
28	MF	JPN	Yuki Okaniwa (from Tokyo University of Agriculture)
29	MF	JPN	Junki Sato (from Senshu University)
32	DF	JPN	Toshiki Nakamura (from (Japan) Tonan Maebashi)
35	FW	JPN	Yuta Kobayashi (from Honjo Daiichi High School)
39	MF	JPN	Ryonosuke Hayasaka (from Meiji University)
40	FW	JPN	Kohei Morita (from (Japan) Ventforet Kofu)
41	GK	JPN	Ayumi Niekawa (on loan from (Japan) Júbilo Iwata)
42	GK	KOR	Han Ho-dong (from (South Korea) Hankuk University)

Out: Note: Flags indicate national team as defined under FIFA eligibility rules; some limited exceptions apply. Players may hold more than one non-FIFA nationality.

No.	Pos.	Nation	Player
3	DF	JPN	Ryota Aoki (retired)
5	DF	JPN	Daichi Inui (to (Japan) V-Varen Nagasaki)
9	FW	BRA	Lucas Gaúcho (released)
14	MF	KOR	Lim Jung-bim (released)
15	MF	JPN	Ryohei Yoshihama (released)
17	FW	JPN	Satoshi Tokiwa (retired)
20	DF	JPN	Hironori Ishikawa (retired)
22	DF	JPN	Ryota Ukai (to (Japan) Tochigi UVA F.C.)
26	MF	JPN	Yusuke Segawa (to (Japan) Omiya Ardija)
27	FW	JPN	Ryota Oiwa (released)
32	MF	JPN	Shun Nakamura (to (Japan) Montedio Yamagata)
35	FW	JPN	Ryo Fukushima (retired)
38	FW	KOR	Oh Han-bin (released)
—	DF	JPN	Nobuyuki Kawashima (to (Japan) Fujieda MYFC, previously on loan)
—	MF	JPN	Shohei Yokoyama (to (Japan) Machida Zelvia, previously on loan)
—	FW	JPN	Yosei Otsu (to (Japan) Oita Trinita, previously on loan)

== Tokyo Verdy ==
In: Note: Flags indicate national team as defined under FIFA eligibility rules; some limited exceptions apply. Players may hold more than one non-FIFA nationality.

No.	Pos.	Nation	Player
4	DF	JPN	Shinnosuke Hatanaka (back from (Japan) Machida Zelvia, previously on loan)
10	MF	JPN	Yoshiaki Takagi (from (Japan) Shimizu S-Pulse, previously on loan)
17	MF	JPN	Tatsuya Uchida (on loan from (Japan) Gamba Osaka)
19	DF	JPN	Mitsuru Nagata (from (Japan) Urawa Red Diamonds)
27	MF	JPN	Hideo Hashimoto (from (Japan) Cerezo Osaka)
31	GK	JPN	Hiroyuki Takeda (on loan from (Japan) Cerezo Osaka)
33	FW	JPN	Kota Watanabe (promoted from youth ranks)
34	GK	JPN	Keisuke Naito (from (Japan) Machida Zelvia)
38	MF	JPN	Ryota Kajikawa (from (Japan) V-Varen Nagasaki)

Out: Note: Flags indicate national team as defined under FIFA eligibility rules; some limited exceptions apply. Players may hold more than one non-FIFA nationality.

No.	Pos.	Nation	Player
7	MF	JPN	Ryuji Sugimoto (to (Japan) Nagoya Grampus)
11	MF	JPN	Shuto Minami (to (Japan) Montedio Yamagata)
13	MF	JPN	Yuji Funayama (retired)
15	DF	BRA	Weslley (to (Brazil) Anapolis FC)
19	GK	JPN	Satoru Oki (on loan to (Japan) Nagano Parceiro)
27	FW	JPN	Hiromu Kori (on loan to (Japan) Gamba Osaka)
28	MF	JPN	Keishi Kusumi (to (Japan) FC Imabari)
29	FW	JPN	Kenji Kitawaki (to (Japan) YSCC)
31	GK	JPN	Ryota Suzuki (back to (Japan) Yokohama F. Marinos, previously on loan)
45	MF	JPN	Hideki Nagai (retired)
—	GK	JPN	William Popp (on loan to (Japan) Kawasaki Frontale, previously on loan at (Japan) FC Gifu)
—	MF	JPN	Ryo Shibuya (on loan to (Japan) ReinMeer Aomori)

== Kamatamare Sanuki ==
In: Note: Flags indicate national team as defined under FIFA eligibility rules; some limited exceptions apply. Players may hold more than one non-FIFA nationality.

No.	Pos.	Nation	Player
3	DF	JPN	Taiki Nakashima (from Fukuoka University)
6	DF	JPN	Atsushi Ichimura (from (Japan) Yokohama FC)
7	MF	KOR	Lee Yon-jick (from (Japan) V-Varen Nagasaki)
16	GK	JPN	Shuhei Matsubara (from (Japan) Fagiano Okayama)
20	FW	JPN	Kazuki Hara (from (Japan) Giravanz Kitakyushu)
28	DF	JPN	Takuya Nagasawa (from Ryukoku University)
30	DF	BRA	Evson (from (Brazil) Corinthians Alagoano, previously on loan)

Out: Note: Flags indicate national team as defined under FIFA eligibility rules; some limited exceptions apply. Players may hold more than one non-FIFA nationality.

No.	Pos.	Nation	Player
2	DF	JPN	Yuki Ozawa (released)
3	DF	JPN	Kodai Fujii (to (Japan) Machida Zelvia)
6	MF	JPN	Kohei Fujita (to (Japan) Suzuka Unlimited FC)
16	GK	JPN	Kenta Ishii (released)
18	FW	BRA	Miguel Bianconi (back to (Japan) Palmeiras, previously on loan)
27	GK	JPN	Daiki Shinagawa (released)
31	MF	KOR	Han Chang-joo (released)

== FC Gifu ==
In: Note: Flags indicate national team as defined under FIFA eligibility rules; some limited exceptions apply. Players may hold more than one non-FIFA nationality.

No.	Pos.	Nation	Player
4	DF	JPN	Kentaro Kai (from Hannan University)
6	MF	ESP	Sisinio (from (Greece) Veria FC)
8	MF	JPN	Hideyuki Nozawa (on loan from (Japan) FC Tokyo)
9	FW	BRA	Cristian (from (Lithuania) FC Stumbras)
10	MF	JPN	Yoshihiro Shoji (from (Japan) Renofa Yamaguchi)
11	FW	JPN	Kyogo Furuhashi (from Chuo University)
16	DF	JPN	Takayuki Fukumura (on loan from (Japan) Shimizu S-Pulse)
17	MF	JPN	Yuki Omoto (from Hannan University)
19	FW	JPN	Kento Yabuuchi (from Osaka Sangyo University)
25	GK	ESP	Víctor (from (Spain) CE L'Hospitalet)
27	DF	BRA	Henik (from (Brazil) Botafogo)
28	MF	JPN	Yushi Nagashima (on loan from (Japan) Kyoto Sanga)

Out: Note: Flags indicate national team as defined under FIFA eligibility rules; some limited exceptions apply. Players may hold more than one non-FIFA nationality.

No.	Pos.	Nation	Player
4	DF	JPN	Naoya Okane (to (Japan) SC Sagamihara)
6	MF	JPN	Keiji Takachi (released)
9	FW	BRA	Evandro (released)
10	MF	BRA	Leonardo Rocha (released)
11	FW	JPN	Junki Endo (to (Japan) Machida Zelvia)
17	DF	JPN	Shun Nogaito (to (Japan) Vanraure Hachinohe)
18	DF	JPN	Yuki Fuji (to (Japan) Suzuka Unlimited FC)
19	MF	JPN	Tsukasa Masuyama (retired)
22	GK	JPN	William Popp (back to (Japan) Tokyo Verdy, previously on loan)
26	DF	JPN	Keigo Omi (to (Japan) Kochi United SC)
28	MF	JPN	Taisuke Mizuno (to (Japan) Fujieda MYFC)
29	FW	JPN	Bruno Suzuki (to (Malaysia) Negeri Sembilan FA)
32	MF	JPN	Yudai Ogawa (released)
33	FW	BRA	Léo Mineiro (back to (Brazil) Atletico Paranaense, previously on loan)
34	FW	JPN	Tatsuya Tanaka (back to (Japan) Roasso Kumamoto, previously on loan)
37	MF	KOR	Choi Sung-keun (back to (Japan) Sagan Tosu, previously on loan)
—	MF	JPN	Masaru Akiba (to (Japan) Zweigen Kanazawa, previously on loan)
—	MF	JPN	Ryoto Higa (to (Japan) Blaublitz Akita, previously on loan)
—	MF	JPN	Takumi Kiyomoto (to (Japan) Oita Trinita, previously on loan)

== Zweigen Kanazawa ==
In: Note: Flags indicate national team as defined under FIFA eligibility rules; some limited exceptions apply. Players may hold more than one non-FIFA nationality.

No.	Pos.	Nation	Player
6	MF	JPN	Hisashi Ohashi (from (Japan) Kashima Antlers)
7	MF	JPN	Masaru Akiba (from (Japan) FC Gifu, previously on loan)
9	FW	JPN	Koichi Sato (from (Japan) V-Varen Nagasaki)
11	MF	JPN	Kyohei Sugiura (from (Japan) Vegalta Sendai)
13	DF	JPN	Kodai Enomoto (from Senshu University)
19	FW	JPN	Yuki Kakita (on loan from (Japan) Kashima Antlers)
23	GK	JPN	Yuto Shirai (from (Japan) Matsumoto Yamaga)
28	DF	JPN	Ryoma Ishida (on loan from (Japan) Júbilo Iwata)

Out: Note: Flags indicate national team as defined under FIFA eligibility rules; some limited exceptions apply. Players may hold more than one non-FIFA nationality.

No.	Pos.	Nation	Player
6	MF	JPN	Akira Ando (back to (Japan) Shonan Bellmare, previously on loan)
7	MF	JPN	Masataka Kani (back to (Japan) Kawasaki Frontale, previously on loan)
9	FW	PRK	An Byong-jun (back to (Japan) Kawasaki Frontale, previously on loan)
10	MF	JPN	Andrew Kumagai (back to (Japan) Yokohama F. Marinos, previously on loan)
11	DF	JPN	Hiroyuki Furuta (on loan to (Japan) Blaublitz Akita)
13	FW	JPN	Shoma Mizunaga (on loan to (Japan) Giravanz Kitakyushu)
15	MF	JPN	Shinji Tsujio (to (Japan) SC Sagamihara)
17	FW	BRA	Romarinho (to (Brazil) Macaé)
19	MF	JPN	Shungo Tamashiro (to (Japan) FC Imabari)
21	GK	JPN	Motofumi Ohashi (retired)
23	DF	JPN	Kazuaki Mawatari (to (Japan) Tokushima Vortis)
39	FW	BRA	David (to (Kuwait) Qadsia SC)
—	MF	JPN	Shingo Honda (released, previously on loan at (Japan) Honda FC)
—	FW	JPN	Shoichiro Sakamoto (to Albirex Niigata Singapore, previously on loan at (Japan) Tegevajaro Miyazaki)
—	FW	JPN	Shogo Yoshikawa (to (Japan) Vanraure Hachinohe, previously on loan)

== Oita Trinita ==
In: Note: Flags indicate national team as defined under FIFA eligibility rules; some limited exceptions apply. Players may hold more than one non-FIFA nationality.

No.	Pos.	Nation	Player
3	DF	JPN	Kyohei Kuroki (from (Japan) Renofa Yamaguchi)
4	DF	JPN	Akira Takeuchi (from (Japan) Nagoya Grampus)
11	FW	JPN	Yohei Hayashi (from (Japan) FC Tokyo)
14	DF	JPN	Shohei Kishida (from (Japan) Sagan Tosu)
15	MF	JPN	Takumi Kiyomoto (from (Japan) FC Gifu, previously on loan)
17	MF	JPN	Shintaro Kobuku (from Ritsumeikan University)
19	FW	JPN	Yosei Otsu (from (Japan) Thespakusatsu Gunma, previously on loan)
20	MF	JPN	Koki Kotegawa (from (Japan) Giravanz Kitakyushu)
29	GK	JPN	Shun Takagi (from (Japan) Kawasaki Frontale)
32	MF	JPN	Ryosuke Maeda (on loan from (Japan) Vissel Kobe)
33	MF	JPN	Jun Suzuki (on loan from (Japan) Avispa Fukuoka)
35	DF	JPN	Tatsuya Sakai (on loan from (Japan) Sagan Tosu, previously on loan at (Japan) V-Varen Nagasaki)
36	MF	JPN	Takuya Nogami (promoted from youth ranks)
48	MF	JPN	Shota Kawanishi (from (Japan) Montedio Yamagata)

Out: Note: Flags indicate national team as defined under FIFA eligibility rules; some limited exceptions apply. Players may hold more than one non-FIFA nationality.

No.	Pos.	Nation	Player
10	MF	JPN	Masaya Matsumoto (to (Japan) Júbilo Iwata)
11	FW	BRA	Paulinho (released)
13	FW	JPN	Daiki Takamatsu (retired)
14	MF	JPN	Takanori Chiaki (to (Japan) SC Sagamihara)
17	FW	BRA	Thiago Quirino (back to (Japan) Shonan Bellmare, previously on loan)
22	MF	JPN	Yuki Yamanouchi (to Albirex Niigata Singapore)
26	MF	JPN	Kazuki Egashira (on loan to (Japan) Suzuka Unlimited FC)
31	GK	JPN	Kenshin Yoshimaru (back to (Japan) Vissel Kobe, previously on loan)
35	DF	BRA	Daniel Silva dos Santos (to (Brazil) Cabofriense)
38	FW	KOR	Kim Dong-wook (released)
50	DF	JPN	Shinji Yamaguchi (back to (Japan) Vissel Kobe, previously on loan)
