= Yamanoi =

Yamanoi (written: 山ノ井 lit. "mountain well") is a Japanese surname. Notable people with the surname include:

- Eri Yamanoi (born 1978), Japanese swimmer
- Jin Yamanoi (born 1962), Japanese voice actor
- Kazunori Yamanoi (born 1962), Japanese politician
- Takumi Yamanoi (山ノ井 拓己, born 1998), Japanese footballer
- Tomohiro Yamanoi (born 1977), Japanese swimmer
