= Motofumi =

- Gender: Male

Origin
- Origin: Japanese
- Meaning: Different meanings depending on the kanji used

Motofumi (written: 源文 or 基史) is a masculine Japanese given name. Notable people with the name include:

- Motofumi Kobayashi (小林 源文; born 1951), Japanese manga artist
- Motofumi Ohashi (大橋 基史; born 1987), Japanese footballer
