= Shuhei Matsubara =

Japanese footballer (born 1992)

Shuhei Matsubara 松原 修平
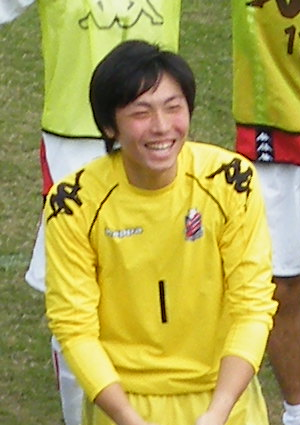
- Matsubara with Consadole Sapporo in 2010

Personal information
- Full name: Shuhei Matsubara
- Date of birth: August 11, 1992 (age 34)
- Place of birth: Hakodate, Hokkaido, Japan
- Height: 1.83 m (6 ft 0 in)
- Position: Goalkeeper

Team information
- Current team: Mito HollyHock
- Number: 21

Youth career
- 2005–2010: Consadole Sapporo

Senior career*
Years	Team	Apps	(Gls)
2011–2016	Fagiano Okayama	0	(0)
2011–2016	→ Fagiano Okayama Next (loan)	65	(0)
2017	Kamatamare Sanuki	1	(0)
2018	Thespakusatsu Gunma	32	(0)
2019	Shonan Bellmare	1	(0)
2020–2021	Thespakusatsu Gunma	29	(0)
2022	Kyoto Sanga FC	0	(0)
2022–24	Hokkaido Consadole Sapporo	1	(0)
2024-	Mito HollyHock	34	(0)
- * Club domestic league appearances and goals as of 12 August 2026

Shuhei Matsubara (松原 修平, Matsubara Shuhei; born August 11, 1992) is a Japanese football player who plays as a goalkeeper for Mito HollyHock.

== Club statistics ==
Updated to 11 April 2022.

Club performance			League		Cup		Total	
Season	Club	League	Apps	Goals	Apps	Goals	Apps	Goals
Japan			League		Emperor's Cup		Total	
2011	Fagiano Okayama	J2 League	0	0	0	0	0	0
2012	Fagiano Okayama	J2 League	0	0	0	0	0	0
2013	Fagiano Okayama	J2 League	0	0	0	0	0	0
2014	Fagiano Okayama	J2 League	0	0	0	0	0	0
2015	Fagiano Okayama	J2 League	0	0	0	0	0	0
2016	Fagiano Okayama	J2 League	0	0	0	0	0	0
2017	Kamatamare Sanuki	J2 League	1	0	1	0	2	0
2018	Thespakusatsu Gunma	J3 League	32	0	1	0	33	0
2019	Shonan Bellmare	J1 League	0	0	0	0	0	0
2020	Thespakusatsu Gunma	J2 League	10	0	1	0	11	0
2021	Thespakusatsu Gunma	J2 League	17	0	0	0	17	0
2022	Consadole Sapporo	J1 League	0	0	0	0	0	0
Total			50	0	3	0	53	0
