= Junki Endo =

Japanese footballer (born 1994)

Junki Endo 遠藤 純輝
Personal information
- Full name: Junki Endo
- Date of birth: 8 December 1994 (age 31)
- Place of birth: Seki, Gifu, Japan
- Height: 1.78 m (5 ft 10 in)
- Position: Forward

Team information
- Current team: J-Lease FC
- Number: 8

Youth career
- 2010–2012: Chukyo High School

Senior career*
| Years | Team | Apps | (Gls) |
| 2013 | → FC Gifu Second (loan) | 13 | (5) |
| 2014–2016 | FC Gifu | 48 | (4) |
| 2015 | → J. League U-22 (loan) | 2 | (0) |
| 2017 | Machida Zelvia | 8 | (1) |
| 2018 | Fujieda MYFC | 22 | (4) |
| 2019–2022 | Suzuka U/Suzuka PG | 68 | (14) |
| 2023– | J-Lease FC | 0 | (0) |
- * Club domestic league appearances and goals as of 27 November 2022, 2:28 (UTC)

Junki Endo (遠藤 純輝, born 8 December 1994) is a Japanese footballer who plays for J-Lease FC from 2023.

== Career ==
After end of the 2022 season, Endo leave from Suzuka Point Getters after four years at club.

On 20 December 2022, Endo joined to J-Lease FC for upcoming 2023 season.

== Club statistics ==
Updated to the end 2022 season.

| Club performance | | | League | | Cup | | League Cup | | Total | |
| Season | Club | League | Apps | Goals | Apps | Goals | Apps | Goals | Apps | Goals |
| Japan | | | League | | Emperor's Cup | | J. League Cup | | Total | |
|---|---|---|---|---|---|---|---|---|---|---|
| 2013 | FC Gifu Second | JRL (Tokai) | 13 | 5 | 1 | 0 | - | | 14 | 5 |
| 2014 | FC Gifu | J2 League | 26 | 3 | 1 | 0 | - | | 27 | 3 |
| 2015 | FC Gifu | J2 League | 22 | 1 | 2 | 0 | - | | 24 | 1 |
| 2016 | FC Gifu | J2 League | 0 | 0 | 0 | 0 | - | | 0 | 0 |
| 2017 | Machida Zelvia | J2 League | 8 | 1 | 1 | 0 | - | | 9 | 1 |
| 2018 | Fujieda MYFC | J3 League | 22 | 4 | - | | - | | 22 | 4 |
| 2019 | Suzuka U/Suzuka PG | Japan Football League | 30 | 8 | - | | - | | 30 | 8 |
| 2020 | Suzuka U/Suzuka PG | Japan Football League | 12 | 2 | 1 | 1 | - | | 13 | 3 |
| 2021 | Suzuka U/Suzuka PG | Japan Football League | 17 | 3 | 2 | 1 | - | | 19 | 4 |
| 2022 | Suzuka U/Suzuka PG | Japan Football League | 9 | 1 | 0 | 0 | - | | 9 | 1 |
| 2023 | J-Lease | Japanese Regional Leagues | 0 | 0 | 0 | 0 | - | | 0 | 0 |
| Total | | | 159 | 28 | 8 | 2 | - | | 167 | 30 |
