= Keisuke Naito =

Japanese footballer

Keisuke Naito 内藤 圭佑
Personal information
- Full name: Keisuke Naito
- Date of birth: August 11, 1987 (age 39)
- Place of birth: Hiroshima, Japan
- Height: 1.86 m (6 ft 1 in)
- Position: Goalkeeper

Youth career
- 2006–2009: Kokushikan University FC

Senior career*
Years	Team	Apps	(Gls)
2010–2011	Kataller Toyama	17	(0)
2012–2014	Thespakusatsu Gunma	26	(0)
2015–2016	Machida Zelvia	0	(0)
2017	Tokyo Verdy	0	(0)
- * Club domestic league appearances and goals as of 23 February 2018

Keisuke Naito (内藤 圭佑, Naito Keisuke; born August 11, 1987 in Hiroshima) is a Japanese footballer who plays for Tokyo Verdy.

== Career statistics ==
Updated to 23 February 2018.

Appearances and goals by club, season and competition
Club	Season	League			Emperor's Cup		J.League Cup		Total	
Club	Season	Division	Apps	Goals	Apps	Goals	Apps	Goals	Apps	Goals
Kataller Toyama	2010	J2 League	3	0	0	0	-		3	0
Kataller Toyama	2011	J2 League	14	0	0	0	-		0	0
Thespakusatsu Gunma	2012	J2 League	2	0	1	0	-		3	0
Thespakusatsu Gunma	2013	J2 League	10	0	1	0	-		11	0
Thespakusatsu Gunma	2014	J2 League	14	0	0	0	-		14	0
Machida Zelvia	2015	J3 League	0	0	4	0	-		4	0
Machida Zelvia	2016	J2 League	0	0	1	0	-		1	0
Tokyo Verdy	2017	J2 League	0	0	1	0	-		1	0
Career total			43	0	8	0	-		51	0
