= Kenta Ishii =

Japanese footballer (born 1987)

Kenta Ishii 石井健太
Personal information
- Full name: Kenta Ishii
- Date of birth: 8 December 1987 (age 38)
- Place of birth: Shizuoka, Japan
- Height: 1.80 m (5 ft 11 in)
- Position: Goalkeeper

Team information
- Current team: Tegevajaro Miyazaki
- Number: 61

Youth career
- 2003–2005: Tokai University Shoyo High School
- 2006–2009: Tokai University

Senior career*
Years	Team	Apps	(Gls)
2010–2012	Honda Lock SC	53	(0)
2013–2016	Kamatamare Sanuki	5	(0)
2017–	Tegevajaro Miyazaki	84	(0)
- * Club domestic league appearances and goals as of 23 February 2020

Kenta Ishii (石井健太, Ishii Kenta; born 8 December 1987 in Shizuoka), is a Japanese former footballer who played as a goalkeeper. He last played for Tegevajaro Miyazaki and FC Nobeoka Agata.

== Career ==
After three seasons with Honda Lock SC in Miyazaki, Ishii joined Kamatamare Sanuki, who then got promoted to J2 League in 2014. In 2017, he signed for Tegevaro Miyazaki. He helped the team get promoted to J3 League in 2021. He stayed at the club until 2024 and made 84 games for them.

== Club statistics ==
Last updated:14/09/2027

Club performance			League		Cup		Total	
Season	Club	League	Apps	Goals	Apps	Goals	Apps	Goals
Japan			League		Emperor's Cup		Total	
2010	Honda Lock SC	JFL	19	0	0	0	19	0
2011	Honda Lock SC	JFL	19	0	0	0	19	0
2012	Honda Lock SC	JFL	15	0	–		15	0
2013	Kamatamare Sanuki	JFL	0	0	1	0	1	0
2014	Kamatamare Sanuki	J2 League	5	0	0	0	5	0
2015	Kamatamare Sanuki	J2 League	0	0	0	0	0	0
2016	Kamatamare Sanuki	J2 League	0	0	0	0	0	0
2017	Tegevajaro Miyazaki	JRL (Kyushu)	20	0	–		20	0
2018	Tegevajaro Miyazaki	JFL	26	0	0	0	26	0
2019	Tegevajaro Miyazaki	JFL	24	0	–		24	0
2020	Tegevajaro Miyazaki	JFL	4	0	0	0	4	0
2021	Tegevajaro Miyazaki	J3 League	9	0	0	0	9	0
2022	Tegevajaro Miyazaki	J3 League	9	0	0	0	9	0
2023	Tegevajaro Miyazaki	J3 League	0	0	0	0	0	0
Career total			142	0	1	0	143	0
