= Yatsunori Shimaya =

Japanese footballer

Yatsunori Shimaya 島屋 八徳
Personal information
- Full name: Yatsunori Shimaya
- Date of birth: 20 January 1989 (age 37)
- Place of birth: Kitakyushu, Fukuoka, Japan
- Height: 1.70 m (5 ft 7 in)
- Position: Attacking midfielder

Team information
- Current team: Renofa Yamaguchi

Youth career
- 2004–2007: Orio Aishin Junior College
- 2008–2009: Tegevajaro Miyazaki
- 2008–2011: Miyazaki Sangyo-keiei University

Senior career*
Years	Team	Apps	(Gls)
2012–2013	Hoyo Oita	55	(19)
2014–2016	Renofa Yamaguchi	100	(32)
2017–2018	Tokushima Vortis	56	(15)
2018–2019	Sagan Tosu	2	(0)
2019	→ Tokushima Vortis (loan)	12	(0)
2020	Tokushima Vortis	7	(0)
2021–2023	Renofa Yamaguchi	34	(1)
2023–	SONIO Takamatsu		
- * Club domestic league appearances and goals as of 14:22, 3 June 2025 (UTC)

Yatsunori Shimaya (島屋 八徳, Shimaya Yatsunori; born 3 April 1990) is a Japanese footballer who plays as an attacking midfielder for SONIO Takamatsu.

== Career ==
Born in Kitakyushu, Shimaya attended Orio Aishin Junior College during his youth career. Whilst attending the Miyazaki Sangyo-keiei University, he scored in the 91st Emperor's Cup against Kumamoto Teachers' Football Club.

During the 2015 season with Renofa Yamaguchi, Shimaya won promotion to the J2 League with the club. On 11 December 2015, the club announced that Shimaya had signed a new contract with the club through the 2016 season.

On 22 December 2016, Shimaya was announced at Tokushima Vortis on a permanent transfer. Before transferring to Sagan Tosu, he scored his last goal for the club against Renofa Yamaguchi on 12 August 2018, scoring in the 90th+4th minute.

On 16 August 2018, Shimaya was announced at Sagan Tosu on a permanent transfer. On 24 December 2018, the club announced that he extended his contract through the 2019 season.

On 24 July 2019, Shimaya was announced at Tokushima Vortis on a six month loan spell. On 9 January 2020, he joined Tokushima Vortis on a permanent transfer.

On 8 January 2021, Shimaya was announced at fellow J2 club Renofa Yamaguchi on a permanent transfer. On 3 March 2021, the club announced he had suffered an injured left ankle ligament, and would be out for four weeks. During the 2022 season on 21 October 2022, the club announced that it would not be renewing his contract for the 2023 season.

On 1 March 2023, Shimaya was announced at SONIO Takamatsu.

== Career statistics ==
Updated to 24 February 2019.

Appearances and goals by club, season and competition
Club	Season	League			Emperor's Cup		J.League Cup		Total	
Club	Season	Division	Apps	Goals	Apps	Goals	Apps	Goals	Apps	Goals
Hoyo Oita	2012	JFL	27	6	2	0	—		29	6
Hoyo Oita	2013	JFL	28	13	2	0	—		30	13
Renofa Yamaguchi	2014	JFL	22	6	—		—		22	6
Renofa Yamaguchi	2015	J3 League	36	16	1	0	—		37	16
Renofa Yamaguchi	2016	J2 League	42	10	1	0	—		43	10
Tokushima Vortis	2017	J2 League	32	7	0	0	—		32	7
Tokushima Vortis	2018	J2 League	24	8	2	0	—		26	8
Sagan Tosu	2018	J1 League	1	0	0	0	0	0	1	0
Total			212	66	8	0	0	0	220	66
