= Tomohiko Murayama =

Japanese footballer

Tomohiko Murayama 村山智彦
Personal information
- Full name: Tomohiko Murayama
- Date of birth: 22 August 1987 (age 39)
- Place of birth: Ichihara, Chiba, Japan
- Height: 1.84 m (6 ft 0 in)
- Position: Goalkeeper

Team information
- Current team: Matsumoto Yamaga FC
- Number: 16

Youth career
- 2005–2009: Shizuoka Sangyo University SC

Senior career*
Years	Team	Apps	(Gls)
2010–2012	Sagawa Shiga FC	40	(0)
2013–2015	Matsumoto Yamaga FC	85	(1)
2016	Shonan Bellmare	27	(0)
2017–	Matsumoto Yamaga FC	31	(0)
- * Club domestic league appearances and goals as of 29 December 2018

Tomohiko Murayama (村山智彦, Murayama Tomohiko; born 22 August 1987 in Ichihara, Chiba) is a Japanese footballer who plays for Matsumoto Yamaga.

== Youth career ==
In his youth, Murayama played for Mitsui Chiba SC, Jeff United Ichihara JR Youth Tatsumichi, and Municipal Funabashi High School. It was during his first year playing for Municipal Funabashi Hugh School that he first trained to become a full time goal keeper.

== University ==
Murayama played for the Shizuoka Sangyo University SC while attending that university from 2005 to 2009.

== Professional career ==
Murayama joined Sagawa Shiga FC in 2010, and played for them for three seasons until the team suspended operations at the end of the 2012 season. Fortunately he was able to sign a contract with Matsumoto Yamaga FC for the 2013 season. Murayama has played for Matsumoto ever since, except for on season in 2016 when he played for Shonan Bellmare. Murayama's 41 appearances in goal in the 2014 season strongly contributed to Matsumoto's first promotion to the J1 League for the 2015 season.

It was during his single season with Bellmare in 2016 that Murayama achieved his 100 J-League game milestone. Murayama played his 200th J-League game on July 22, 2023, and Matsumoto Yamaga released a range of limited time memorabilia to commemorate this milestone.

== Controversy ==
After an incident in a 2021 game, where Murayama was kicked in the head by a Tochigi player during a save, he made comments on social media which some took to suggest that Tochigi coaches had asked the player involved to do this intentionally. This resulted in a back and forth between the various parties leading eventually to a round of apologies from all concerned.

== Career statistics ==
Updated to end of 2023.

Appearances and goals by club, season and competition
Club	Season	League			Emperor's Cup		J.League Cup		Total	
Club	Season	Division	Apps	Goals	Apps	Goals	Apps	Goals	Apps	Goals
Sagawa Shiga FC	2010	JFL	3	0	0	0	–		3	0
Sagawa Shiga FC	2011	JFL	26	0	1	0	–		27	0
Sagawa Shiga FC	2012	JFL	11	0	0	0	–		11	0
Matsumoto Yamaga	2013	J2 League	10	1	2	0	–		12	1
Matsumoto Yamaga	2014	J2 League	41	0	1	0	–		42	0
Matsumoto Yamaga	2015	J1 League	34	0	4	0	2	0	40	0
Shonan Bellmare	2016	J1 League	27	0	1	0	3	0	31	0
Matsumoto Yamaga	2017	J2 League	28	0	2	0	–		30	0
Matsumoto Yamaga	2018	J2 League	3	0	–		–		3	0
Matsumoto Yamaga	2019	J1 League	3	0	1	0	5	0	9	0
Matsumoto Yamaga	2020	J2 League	27	0	–		1	0	28	0
Matsumoto Yamaga	2021	J2 League	16	0	2	0	–		18	0
Matsumoto Yamaga	2022	J3 League	1	0	2	0	–		3	0
Matsumoto Yamaga	2023	J3 League	23	0	–		–		23	0
Career total			253	1	16	0	11	0	280	1
