= Kodai Fujii =

Japanese footballer

Kodai Fujii 藤井 航大
Personal information
- Full name: Kodai Fujii
- Date of birth: January 13, 1991 (age 35)
- Place of birth: Toyama, Japan
- Height: 1.86 m (6 ft 1 in)
- Position: Centre back

Team information
- Current team: J-Lease FC
- Number: 3

Youth career
- 2006–2008: Kashima Antlers

College career
| Years | Team | Apps | (Gls) |
| 2009–2012 | Tokyo Gakugei University | | |

Senior career*
| Years | Team | Apps | (Gls) |
| 2013–2016 | Kamatamare Sanuki | 114 | (4) |
| 2017–2019 | Machida Zelvia | 65 | (4) |
| 2020–2021 | Iwate Grulla Morioka | 30 | (0) |
| 2022 | Vanraure Hachinohe | 22 | (1) |
| 2023– | J-Lease FC | 0 | (0) |
- * Club domestic league appearances and goals as of 28 December 2022, 20:15 (UTC)

Kodai Fujii (藤井 航大, Fujii Kōdai; born January 13, 1991 in Toyama) is a Japanese footballer. He plays for J-Lease FC from 2023.

== Career statistics ==
Updated to the end 2022 season.

| Club performance | | | League | | Cup | | Other | | Total | |
| Season | Club | League | Apps | Goals | Apps | Goals | Apps | Goals | Apps | Goals |
| Japan | | | League | | Emperor's Cup | | Other^{1} | | Total | |
|---|---|---|---|---|---|---|---|---|---|---|
| 2013 | Kamatamare Sanuki | JFL | 6 | 0 | 1 | 0 | 1 | 0 | 8 | 0 |
| 2014 | Kamatamare Sanuki | J2 League | 38 | 1 | 1 | 0 | 2 | 0 | 41 | 1 |
| 2015 | Kamatamare Sanuki | J2 League | 40 | 1 | 2 | 0 | - | | 42 | 1 |
| 2016 | Kamatamare Sanuki | J2 League | 30 | 2 | 1 | 0 | - | | 31 | 2 |
| 2017 | Machida Zelvia | J2 League | 18 | 0 | 1 | 0 | - | | 19 | 0 |
| 2018 | Machida Zelvia | J2 League | 25 | 3 | 2 | 0 | - | | 27 | 3 |
| 2019 | Machida Zelvia | J2 League | 22 | 1 | 2 | 0 | - | | 27 | 3 |
| 2020 | Iwate Grulla Morioka | J3 League | 29 | 0 | 0 | 0 | - | | 29 | 0 |
| 2021 | Iwate Grulla Morioka | J3 League | 1 | 0 | 0 | 0 | - | | 1 | 0 |
| 2022 | Vanraure Hachinohe | J3 League | 22 | 1 | 0 | 0 | - | | 22 | 1 |
| 2023 | J-Lease FC | Kyushu Soccer League | 0 | 0 | 0 | 0 | - | | 0 | 0 |
| Career total | | | 231 | 9 | 8 | 0 | 3 | 0 | 242 | 9 |

^{1}Includes J2/JFL and J2/J3 play-offs.
