= Takumi Yamanoi =

Japanese footballer (born 1998)

Takumi Yamanoi 山ノ井 拓己
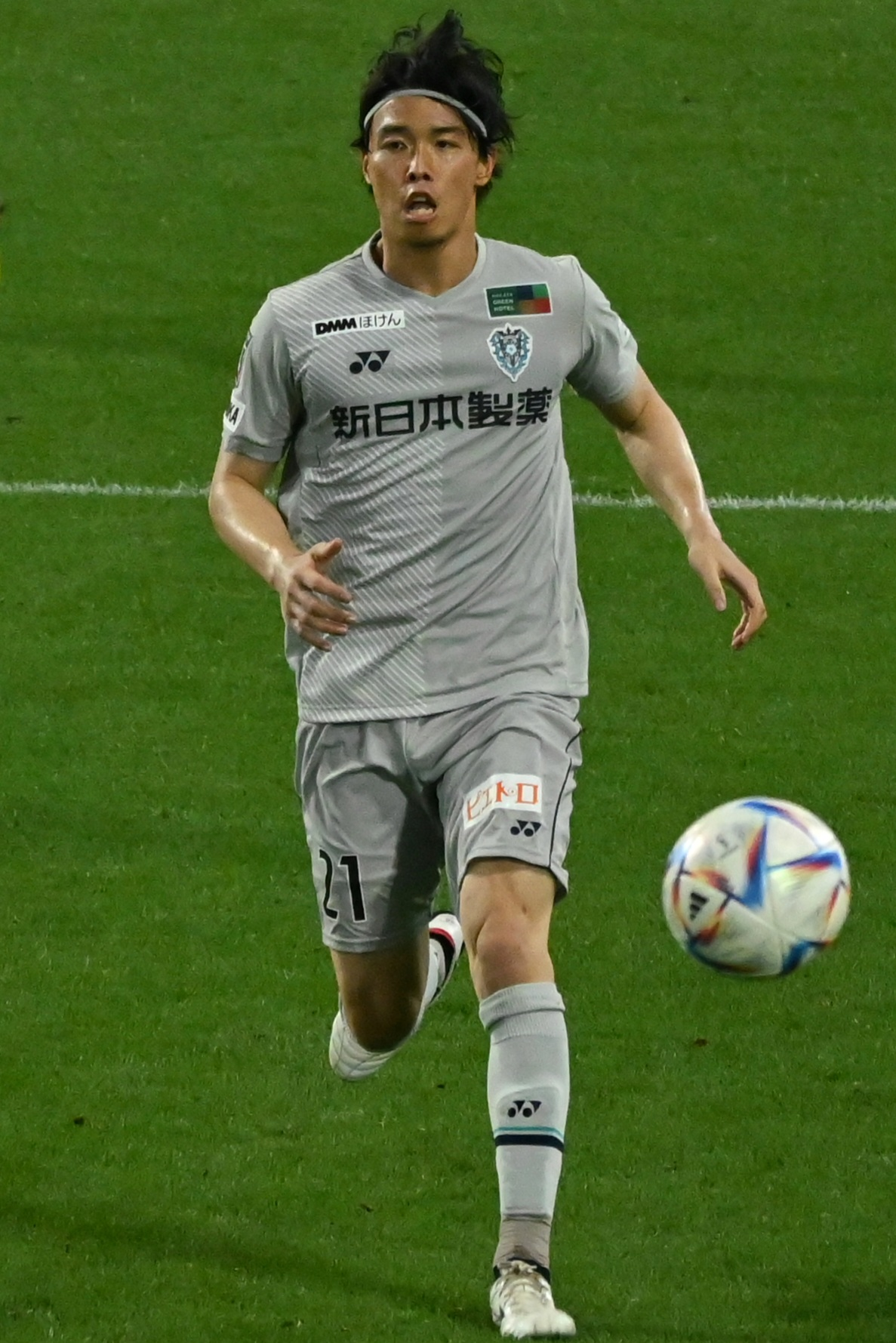
- Takumi Yamanoi Avispa Fukuoka

Personal information
- Full name: Takumi Yamanoi
- Date of birth: October 25, 1998 (age 28)
- Place of birth: Mobara, Chiba, Japan
- Height: 1.85 m (6 ft 1 in)
- Position: Goalkeeper

Team information
- Current team: Zweigen Kanazawa
- Number: 21

Youth career
- 2014–2016: Shizuoka Gakuen High School

Senior career*
Years	Team	Apps	(Gls)
2017–2023	Avispa Fukuoka	1	(0)
2024-	Zweigen Kanazawa	34	(0)
Total		35	(0)
- * Club domestic league appearances and goals as of 1 January 2026

Takumi Yamanoi (山ノ井 拓己, Yamanoi Takumi; born October 25, 1998) is a Japanese football player who plays for Zweigen Kanazawa in the J3 League.

== Playing career ==
Yamanoi was born in Chiba Prefecture on October 25, 1998. After graduating from Shizuoka Gakuen High School, he joined J2 League club Avispa Fukuoka in 2017. On June 6, 2018, he debuted against Kagoshima United FC in Emperor's Cup.

== Career statistics ==
Updated to 21 July 2022.

Appearances and goals by club, season and competition
Club	Season	League			Emperor's Cup		J.League Cup		Total	
Club	Season	Division	Apps	Goals	Apps	Goals	Apps	Goals	Apps	Goals
Avispa Fukuoka	2017	J2 League	0	0	1	0	—		1	0
Avispa Fukuoka	2018	J2 League	0	0	1	0	—		1	0
Avispa Fukuoka	2019	J2 League	0	0	2	0	—		2	0
Avispa Fukuoka	2020	J2 League	1	0	–		–		1	0
Avispa Fukuoka	2021	J1 League	0	0	0	0	1	0	1	0
Avispa Fukuoka	2022	J1 League	0	0	0	0	2	0	2	0
Total			1	0	4	0	3	0	8	0
