= Motofumi Ohashi =

Japanese footballer

Personal information
- Full name: Motofumi Ohashi
- Date of birth: June 24, 1987 (age 39)
- Place of birth: Saitama, Japan
- Height: 1.78 m (5 ft 10 in)
- Position: Goalkeeper

Team information
- Current team: Zweigen Kanazawa
- Number: 21

Senior career*
Years	Team	Apps	(Gls)
2010–2016	Zweigen Kanazawa	108	(0)
- * Club domestic league appearances and goals as of December 31, 2015

Motofumi Ohashi (大橋 基史, Ōhashi Motofumi; born June 24, 1987 in Saitama) is a Japanese football player. He plays for Zweigen Kanazawa.

== Playing career ==
Motofumi Ohashi joined to Zweigen Kanazawa in 2010.
