= Yuki =

Yuki, Yūki or Yuuki may refer to:

== Places ==
- Yuki, Hiroshima (Jinseki), a town in Jinseki District, Hiroshima, Japan
- Yuki, Hiroshima (Saeki), a town in Saeki District, Hiroshima, Japan
- Yūki, Ibaraki, a city on Honshu island in Japan
- Yuki, Tokushima, a town in Kaifu District, Japan
- Yuki, North Korea, now officially called 'Sonbong', a sub-division of the North Korean city of Rason

== People ==
- Yuki (given name), including a list of people named Yuki or Yūki
- Yūki clan, a clan in 14th century Japan
- Yuki people, an indigenous people of northwestern California
- Yuqui people, also spelled Yuki, an indigenous people of Bolivia
- Yu~ki, a 1990s bassist of Malice Mizer
- Yuuki, a referee for various puroresu promotions

== Family name ==
- Yūki (surname), Japanese surname (結城, 夕樹, 結木, etc.)
- Hiroe Yuki (1948–2011), Japanese badminton player
- Kaori Yuki, manga artist active since 1987

== Characters ==
=== First names ===
- Yuki-onna, a character in Japanese folklore
- Yuki (King of Fighters), a character in The King of Fighters video game series
- Yuki (The Last Blade), a character in The Last Blade video game series
- Yuki (Neo Geo Battle Coliseum), a character in the Neo Geo Battle Coliseum video game
- Yuki Cross, a character in the Vampire Knight manga series
- Yuki Funahara, a character in the Psycho-Pass anime series
- Yuuki Konno, a character in the Sword Art Online light novel series
- Yuki Nagato, a character in the Haruhi Suzumiya light novel series
- Yuki "Yukio" ("Yuki O.") Ohara, a character in the Deadpool film series and the Negasonic Teenage Warhead comic-book series
- Yuki Soma (Fruits Basket), a character from the Fruits Basket manga series
- Yuki Suou, a character from the Alya Sometimes Hides Her Feelings in Russian light novel series
- Yuki Takeya, a character in the School-Live! manga series
- Yūki Terumi, a character in the BlazBlue video game series
- Yukiteru Amano, nicknamed Yuki, a character in the Future Diary manga series
- Yuki, an alias used by the character Mafuyu Asahina in Hatsune Miku: Colorful Stage!
- Yuki Tsukishiro, the main antagonist of the mystery adventure game Magical Girl Witch Trials

=== Surnames ===
- Asuna Yuuki, a character in the Sword Art Online light novel series
- Mikan Yuuki, a character in the To Love Ru manga series
- Eiri Yuki, a character in the Gravitation manga series
- Judai Yuki, known as Jaden Yuki in the English dub, a character in the Yu-Gi-Oh! Duel Monsters GX anime series
- Ringo Yuuki, a character in the To Love Ru manga series
- Rito Yuuki, a character in the To Love Ru manga series
- Saibai Yuuki, a character in the To Love Ru manga series
- Setsu Yuuki, known as Dylan Yuki in the English anime dub, a character in the Mirmo de Pon! manga series

== Other uses ==
- Yuki Enterprise, former name of Examu, a Japanese video game company
- Yuki language, an extinct language of California
- Yuki (dog), dog owned by Lyndon B. Johnson
- Kaai Yuki (歌愛ユキ), a vocal synth software

== See also ==
- Yūki Domain, a Japanese domain of the Edo period, located in Shimōsa Province
- Yuki Ito (disambiguation)
- Yuki Kato (disambiguation)
- Yuki Saito (disambiguation)
- Yuki Sato (disambiguation)
- Yuki Station (disambiguation)
- Yukie (disambiguation)
- Yukio
- Yukigassen, a snowball fighting-competition from Japan
- Yukimura, a Japanese family and given name
