= Yuki (given name) =

- Pronunciation: [juki] (Yuki) [jɯːki] (Yūki)
- Gender: Unisex

Origin
- Origin: Japanese
- Meaning: Depends on the kanji used
- Region of origin: Japan

Other names
- Related names: Yukie; Yukiko; Yukio

Yuki (ゆき, ユキ) and Yūki/Yuuki (ゆうき, ユーキ) are separate Japanese given names used for females or males, though they can be romanized the same way when vowel length is not transliterated. Generally, Yuki is more common for females, while Yūki is more common for males.

Possible spellings of Yuki include 雪, 幸, 由紀, 由貴, 由岐, 由樹, 友紀, 夕希 and 有希. Possible spellings of Yūki include 勇気, 有機, 祐樹, 雄輝 and 雄樹.

== Notable people named Yuki ==
- Yuki Aino (愛野ユキ, born 1994), is a Japanese professional wrestler and former ring announcer
- Yuki Arai (荒井優希, born 1998), is a Japanese professional wrestler and idol
- Yuki Baba (馬場雄基, born 1992), Japanese politician
- Yuki Ebihara (海老原 有希; born 1985), Japanese javelin thrower
- Yuki Fukushima (福島 由紀; born 1993), Japanese badminton player
- Yuki Hashimoto (judoka) (橋本 優貴; born 1989), Japanese judoka
- Yuki Inoue (井上 由起; born 1970), better known as Satsuki Yukino, Japanese voice actress
- Yuki Irie (入江 ゆき; born 1992), Japanese sport wrestler
- Yuki Ishii (石井 優希; born 1991), Japanese volleyball player
- Yuki Ishikawa (石川 友紀; born 1987), Japanese female volleyball player
- Yuki Ishikawa (石川祐希; born 1995), Japanese male volleyball player
- Yuki Iwata (岩田 ユキ; born 1972), Japanese film director and illustrator
- Yuki Kaida (甲斐田 ゆき; born 1974), Japanese voice actress and radio personality
- Yuki Kajiura (梶浦 由記; born 1965), Japanese composer and music producer
- Yuki Kamifuku (上福佑季, born 1993)is a Japanese professional wrestler
- Yuki Kashiwagi (柏木 由紀; born 1991), Japanese idol and singer
- Yuki Kato (geisha) (加藤 ユキ; 1881–1963), Japanese geisha
- Yuki Kato (athlete) (加藤 有希), Japanese Paralympic athlete
- Yuki Kato (actress) (born 1995), Indonesian actress
- Yuki Katsura (桂 ゆき; 1913–1991), Japanese artist
- Yuki Kawai (河合 由貴; born 1990), Japanese volleyball player
- Yuki Kihara (born 1975), Samoan artist
- Yuki Kimura (木村 有希; born 1996), better known as Yukipoyo, Japanese model and television personality
- Yuki Kiriga (霧賀 ユキ), Japanese mangaka
- Yuki Kobayashi (skier) (小林 由貴; born 1987), Japanese cross-country skier
- Yuki Kodama (小玉 ユキ), Japanese manga artist
- Yuki Konagaya (小長谷 有紀; born 1957), Japanese academic
- Yuki Koyanagi (小柳 ゆき; born 1982), Japanese pop singer
- Yuki Kuramochi (倉持 有希; born 1972), better known as YUKI, Japanese singer
- Yuki Kure (呉 由姫), Japanese manga artist and illustrator
- Yuki Maeda (前田 有紀; born 1979), Japanese enka singer
- Yuki Mamiya (間宮 夕貴; born 1991), Japanese actress
- Yuki Masuda (増田 ゆき; born 1973), Japanese voice actress
- Yuki Matsunaga (松永 雪希), Japanese voice actress
- Yuki Matsushita (actress) (松下 由樹; born 1968), Japanese actress
- Yuki Matsuoka (松岡 由貴; born 1970), Japanese voice actress
- Yuki Midorikawa (緑川 ゆき; born 1976), Japanese manga artist
- Yuki Miyazawa (宮澤 夕貴; born 1993), Japanese women's basketball player
- Yuki Motobuchi (元渕 幸; born 1968), Japanese diver
- Yuki Nagaku (長久 友紀; born 1990), Japanese voice actress
- Yuki Nakajima (中島 由貴; born 1990), Japanese biathlete
- Yuki Nakata (中田 有紀; born 1977), Japanese heptathlete
- Yuki Naoi (直井 由紀; born 1963), Japanese goalball player
- Yuki Ninagawa (蜷川 有紀; born 1960), Japanese actress
- Yuki Ogura (小倉 遊亀; 1895–2000), Japanese painter
- Yuki Onodera (オノデラ ユキ; born 1962), Japanese photographer
- Yuki Saito (actress) (斉藤 由貴; born 1966), Japanese singer-songwriter, actress, writer and poet
- Yuki Sato (softball) (佐藤 由希; born 1980), Japanese softball player
- Yuki Shibamoto (柴本 幸; born 1983), Japanese actress
- Yuki Nakashima (voice actress) (中島 由貴; born 1997), Japanese voice actress
- Yuki Shimizu (志水 ゆき), Japanese manga artist
- Yuki Suetsugu (末次 由紀; born 1975), Japanese manga artist
- Yuki Sunaga (須長 由季; born 1980), Japanese windsurfer
- Yuki Tanabe (田邉 夕貴; born 1989), Japanese team handball player
- Yuki Tanada (タナダ ユキ; born 1975), Japanese film director and screenwriter
- Yuki Tanaka (volleyball) (田中 弓貴; born 1981), Japanese volleyball player
- Yuki Taniguchi (谷口 由紀; born 1993), Japanese shogi player
- Yuki Tsubota (born 1994), Canadian freestyle skier
- Yuki Uchida (内田 有紀; born 1975), Japanese actress, idol, singer and model
- Yuki Uchiyama (artistic gymnast) (内山 由綺), Japanese artistic gymnast
- Yuki Urushibara (漆原 友紀; born 1974), Japanese manga artist
- Yuki Yamasaki (山﨑 夕貴; born 1987), Japanese announcer
- Yuki Yokosawa (横澤 由貴; born 1980), Japanese judoka

=== Other people ===
- Yuki Bhambri (born 1992), Indian tennis player
- Yuki Hsu (born 1978), Taiwanese pop singer
- Yuki Ip, Hong Kong opera singer
- Yuki Ip (born 1995), Macanese model, YouTuber, and entertainer.

=== Fictional characters ===
- Yuki Funahara (船原 ゆき), a character in the anime series Psycho-Pass
- Yuki Himekawa (姫川 友紀), a character in the video game The Idolmaster Cinderella Girls
- Yuki Kojima (小島 有希), a character in the manga series Whistle!
- Yuki Kaizuka (界塚 ユキ), a character in the anime series Aldnoah.Zero
- Yuki Kurihara (栗原 雪), a character in the manga series Momokuri
- Yuki Kusakabe (日下部 雪), a character in the manga series Interviews with Monster Girls
- Yuki Mori (森 雪), a character in the anime series Space Battleship Yamato
- Yuki Nagato (長門 有希), a character in the light novel series The Melancholy of Haruhi Suzumiya
- Yuki Ōyama, a character in the webcomic Ménage à 3
- Yuki Rurikawa (瑠璃川 幸), a character in the video game A3!
- Yuki Soma (Fruits Basket) (草摩 由希), a character in the manga series Fruits Basket
- Yuki Suou (周防 有希), a character in the light novel series Alya Sometimes Hides Her Feelings in Russian
- Yuki Takeya (丈槍 由紀), a character in the manga series School-Live!
- Yuki Ueno (上野 ユキ), a character in the tokusatsu series Battle Fever J
- Yuki Urakawa (浦川 由貴), a character in the manga series Ceres, Celestial Legend
- Yuki Yoshikawa (吉川 由紀), a character in the manga series Horimiya
- Yuki, Otakuthon mascot
- Yuki (雪), a character in the video game World's End Club
- Yuki Nekoyashiki (猫屋敷 ユキ), a character in the anime series Wonderful PreCure!
- Yuki Tsukumo (九十九 由基), a character from the manga and anime series Jujutsu Kaisen

== Notable people named Yūki ==
- Yuhki (keyboardist), a keyboard player of Japanese metal band Galneryus
- Yuuki (keyboardist), a keyboard player of Japanese group An Cafe
- Yuki Abe (阿部 勇樹; born 1981), Japanese footballer
- Yuki Aida (相田 勇樹; born 1998), Japanese footballer
- Yuki Aizu (会津 雄生; born 1996), Japanese footballer
- Yūki Akiyoshi (秋吉 夕紀; born 1985), Japanese ten-pin bowler
- Yūki Amami (天海 祐希; born 1967), Japanese actress
- Yuki Chikudate (筑館 祐樹), Japanese-American musician
- Chiyoōtori Yūki (千代鳳 祐樹; born 1992), Japanese sumo wrestler
- Yuki Egawa (江川 優生; born 1998), Japanese kickboxer
- Yuki Fuji (冨士 祐樹; born 1981), Japanese footballer
- Yūki Fujikura (藤倉 勇樹; born 1979), Japanese shogi player
- Yuki Fukaya (深谷 友基; born 1982), Japanese footballer
- Yuki Fuke (福家 勇輝; born 1991), Japanese footballer
- Yuki Furukawa (古川 雄輝; born 1987), Japanese actor and model
- Yuki Furuta (古田 佑紀; born 1942), Japanese prosecutor
- Yuki Fushimi (伏見 有希), Japanese women's footballer
- Yuki Goto (singer, born 1986), rapper of the Japanese group EE Jump
- Yuki Hamamoto (濱本 裕基; born 1985), Japanese motorcycle racer
- Yuki Hamano (濵野 勇気; born 1978), Japanese footballer
- Yūki Hasegawa (長谷川 優貴; born 1995), Japanese shogi player
- Yūki Hashimoto (baseball) (橋本 侑樹; born 1998), Japanese baseball player
- Yuki Hashimoto (footballer) (橋本 裕貴; born 1994), Japanese footballer
- Yuki Hashioka (橋岡 優輝; born 1999), Japanese long jumper
- Yuki Hashizume (橋爪 勇樹; born 1990), Japanese footballer
- Yuki Hayashi (archer) (林 勇気; born 1984), Japanese archer
- Yuki Hayashi (composer) (林 ゆうき; born 1980), Japanese composer and music arranger
- Yūki Himura (日村 勇紀; born 1972), Japanese comedian
- Yuki Honda (本多 勇喜; born 1991), Japanese footballer
- Yuki Horigome (堀米 勇輝; born 1992), Japanese footballer
- Yuki Ichikawa (市川 祐樹; born 1987), Japanese footballer
- Yuki Ikari (井狩 裕貴; born 2000), Japanese swimmer
- Yuki Ikeya (池谷 友喜; born 1995), Japanese footballer
- Yuki Imai (今井 悠貴; born 1998), Japanese actor
- Yuki Inamori (稲森 佑貴; born 1994), Japanese golfer
- Yuki Inoue (footballer) (井上 雄幾; born 1977), Japanese footballer
- Yuki Ishida (石田 祐樹; born 1980), Japanese footballer
- Yūki Ishikawa (石川 祐希; born 1995), Japanese volleyball player
- Yuki Ito (actor) (伊藤 友樹; born 1985), Japanese actor and musician
- Yuki Ito (cellist) (伊藤 悠貴), Japanese classical cellist
- Yuuki Ito (motorcyclist) (伊藤 勇樹; born 1991), Japanese motorcyclist
- Yuki Ito (ski jumper) (伊藤 有希; born 1994), Japanese ski jumper
- Yuki Kadono (角野 友基; born 1996), Japanese snowboarder
- Yuki Kadono (water polo) (角野 友紀; born 1990), Japanese water polo player
- Yuki Kagawa (香川 勇気; born 1992), Japanese footballer
- Yūki Kaji (梶 裕貴; born 1985), Japanese voice actor
- Yuki Kajiura (footballer) (梶浦 勇輝; born 2004), Japanese footballer
- Yuki Kakita (垣田 裕暉; born 1997), Japanese footballer
- Yuhki Kamatani (鎌谷 悠希; born 1983), Japanese manga artist and illustrator
- Yūki Kaneko (金子 有希; born 1987), Japanese voice actress
- Yuki Kaneko (footballer, born 1982) (金子 勇樹), Japanese footballer
- Yuki Kaneko (badminton) (金子 祐樹; born 1994), Japanese badminton player
- Yuki Karakawa (唐川 侑己; born 1989), Japanese baseball player
- Yuki Kasahara (笠原 友希; born 2001), Japanese kickboxer
- Yūki Katō (footballer) (加藤 有輝; born 1997), Japanese footballer
- Yuki Kawabe (川邊 裕紀; born 1897), Japanese footballer
- Yuki Kawakami (川上 優樹; born 1997), Japanese footballer
- Yuki Kawata (河田 悠希; born 1997), Japanese archer
- Yuki Kawauchi (川内 優輝; born 1987), Japanese marathon runner
- Yuki Kikuchi (菊池 悠希; born 1990), Japanese speed skater
- Yuki Kikumoto (菊本 侑希; born 1993), Japanese footballer
- Yuki Kitai (北井 佑季; born 1990), Japanese footballer
- Yuki Kobayashi (footballer, born 1988) (小林 裕紀), Japanese footballer
- Yuki Kobayashi (footballer, born 1992) (小林 祐希), Japanese footballer
- Yuki Kobayashi (footballer, born 2000) (小林 友希), Japanese footballer
- Yuki Kobori (小堀 勇氣; born 1993), Japanese swimmer
- Yuki Koike (sprinter) (小池 祐貴; born 1995), Japanese sprinter
- Yuki Kohara (小原 裕貴; born 1980), Japanese idol, actor and singer
- Yuki Kondo (近藤 有己; born 1975), Japanese mixed martial artist
- Yuki Kotani (小谷 祐喜; born 1991), Japanese footballer
- Yuki Koyama (小山 雄輝; born 1988), Japanese baseball player
- Yuki Kubota (久保田 悠来; born 1981), Japanese actor and model
- Yuki Kuniyoshi (国吉 佑樹; born 1991), Japanese baseball player
- Yuki Kusano (草野 侑己; born 1996), Japanese footballer
- Yūki Kuwahara (桑原 由気; born 1991), Japanese voice actress
- Yuki Maki (巻 佑樹; born 1984), Japanese footballer
- Yuki Matsubara (松原 優吉; born 1988), Japanese footballer
- Yūki Masuda (増田 裕生; born 1979), Japanese voice actor
- Yuuki Matsuda (松田 佑貴), Japanese voice actor
- Yuki Matsui (松井 裕樹; born 1995), Japanese baseball player
- Yuki Matsumoto (松本 祐樹; born 1989), Japanese footballer
- Yuki Matsushita (footballer) (松下 裕樹; born 1981), Japanese footballer
- Yuki Matsushita (athlete) (松下 祐樹; born 1991), Japanese hurdler
- Yuki Matsuzaki (松崎 悠希; born 1981), Japanese actor
- Yuki Mawatari (馬渡 勇喜; 1909–?), Japanese swimmer
- Yūki Mihara (三原 勇希; born 1990), Japanese model and gravure idol
- Yuki Mitsuhara (満原 優樹; born 1989), Japanese basketball player
- Yūki Mizuhara (水原 ゆう紀; born 1953), Japanese actress
- Yuki Morikawa (森川 裕基; born 1993), Japanese footballer
- Yuki Muto (武藤 雄樹; born 1988), Japanese footballer
- Yuki Nagahata (永畑 祐樹; born 1989), Japanese footballer
- Yūki Nagasato (永里 優季; born 1987), Japanese women's footballer
- Yuki Naito (内藤 祐希; born 2001), Japanese tennis player
- Yuki Nakai (中井 祐樹; born 1970), Japanese mixed martial artist and sport wrestler
- Yuki Nakamura (中村 祐輝; born 1987), Japanese footballer
- Yuki Nakashima (footballer) (中島 裕希; born 1984), Japanese footballer
- Yuhki Nakayama (中山 友貴; born 1987), Japanese racing driver
- Yuki Natsume (棗 佑喜; born 1988), Japanese footballer
- Yuki Nishi (西 勇輝; born 1990), Japanese baseball pitcher
- Yuki Nishino (西野 友毬; born 1993), Japanese figure skater
- Yuki Nishiya (西谷 優希; born 1993), Japanese footballer
- Yuki Nogami (野上 結貴; born 1991), Japanese footballer
- Yuki Ochi (越智 友己; born 1990), Japanese actor
- Yuki Ogaki (大垣 勇樹; born 2000), Japanese footballer
- Yuuki Ogoe (小越 勇輝; born 1994), Japanese actor
- Yūki Okabayashi (岡林 勇希; born 2002), Japanese baseball player
- Yuki Okada (footballer, born 1983) (岡田 佑樹), Japanese footballer
- Yuki Okada (footballer, born 1996) (岡田 優希), Japanese footballer
- Yuki Okamoto (岡本 勇輝; born 1983), Japanese footballer
- Yuki Okaniwa (岡庭 裕貴; born 1995), Japanese footballer
- Yuki Okubo (大久保 裕樹; born 1984), Japanese footballer
- Yuki Omoto (大本 祐槻; born 1994), Japanese footballer
- Yūki Ono (小野 友樹; born 1984), Japanese voice actor
- Yūki Ōno (大野 勇樹; born 1985), Japanese professional wrestler
- Yuki Oogane (大金 佑輝; born 1982), Japanese motorcycle racer
- Yuki Oshitani (押谷 祐樹; born 1989), Japanese footballer
- Yuki Ota (太田 雄貴; born 1985), Japanese fencer
- Yūki Ōtsu (大津 祐樹; born 1990), Japanese footballer
- Yuuki Ozaki (尾崎 雄貴; born 1991), Japanese musician
- Yuki Ozawa (小澤 雄希; born 1983), Japanese footballer
- Yuki Saito (pitcher, born 1987) (齊藤 悠葵; born 1987), Japanese baseball player
- Yuki Saito (pitcher, born 1988) (斎藤 佑樹; born 1988), Japanese baseball player
- Yuki Saneto (實藤 友紀; born 1989), Japanese footballer
- Yuki Saotome (早乙女 友貴; born 1996), Japanese actor
- Yuki Sasahara (笹原 友希; born 1994), Japanese skeleton racer
- Yūki Sasaki (shogi) (佐々木 勇気; born 1994), Japanese shogi player
- Yuki Sato (athlete) (佐藤 悠基; born 1986), Japanese long-distance runner
- Yuki Sato (footballer) (佐藤 悠希; born 1988), Japanese footballer
- Yuki Sato (voice actor) (佐藤 佑暉), Japanese voice actor
- Yuki Sato (wrestler) (佐藤 悠己; born 1985), Japanese professional wrestler
- Yuki Sawamukai (澤向 裕希), Japanese curler
- Yuki Shichijo (七條 祐樹; born 1984), Japanese baseball player
- Yuki Shimada (島田 祐輝; born 1986), Japanese footballer
- Yuki Shoujou (正城 ユウキ; born 1980), Japanese mixed martial artist
- Yuki Suzuki (鈴木 祐貴; born 1997), Japanese volleyball player
- Yūki Tabata (田畠裕基), Japanese manga artist
- Yūki Tai (泰 勇気; born 1977), Japanese voice actor
- Yūki Takada (高田 憂希; born 1993), Japanese voice actress
- Yuki Takahashi (高橋 裕紀; born 1984), Japanese motorcycle racer
- Yūki Takahashi (baseball) (髙橋 優貴; born 1997), Japanese baseball player
- Yuki Takahashi (wrestler) (高橋 侑希), Japanese sport wrestler
- Yuki Takamiya (高宮 祐樹; born 1987), Japanese long-distance runner
- Yuki Takita (田北 雄気; born 1967), Japanese footballer
- Yuki Tamura (田村 祐基; born 1985), Japanese footballer
- Yuuki Tanaka (田中 優季; born 1990), Japanese tennis player
- Tochiōyama Yūki (栃王山 裕規; 1943–2001), Japanese sumo wrestler
- Yuki Togashi (富樫 勇樹; born 1993), Japanese basketball player
- Yūki Tokiwa (常盤 祐貴; born 1991), Japanese voice actor
- Yuki Tsunoda (角田 裕毅; born 2000), Japanese racing driver
- Yuki Uchiyama (footballer) (内山 裕貴; born 1995), Japanese footballer
- Yuki Uekusa (植草 裕樹; born 1982), Japanese footballer
- Yuki Yamada (actor) (山田 裕貴; born 1990), Japanese actor
- Yuki Yamada (darts player) (山田 勇樹; born 1983), Japanese darts player
- Yuki Yamaguchi (山口 有希; born 1984), Japanese sprinter
- Yuki Yamamoto (footballer) (山本 悠樹; born 1997), Japanese footballer
- Yuuki Yamamoto (model) (山本 優希; born 1987), Japanese fashion model
- Yuki Yamamura (山村 佑樹; born 1990), Japanese footballer
- Yuki Yamazaki (racewalker) (山崎 勇喜; born 1984), Japanese racewalker
- Yuki Yamazaki (footballer) (山崎 侑輝; born 1990), Japanese footballer
- Yuki Yanagita (柳田 悠岐; born 1988), Japanese baseball player
- Yuki Yatomi (矢富 勇毅; born 1985), Japanese rugby union player
- Yūki Yoda (与田 祐希; born 2000), Japanese idol and actress
- Yuki Yoshimura (baseball) (吉村 裕基; born 1984), Japanese baseball player

=== Fictional characters ===
- Yuki Aihara (藍原 ゆうき), a character in the anime series Go! Princess PreCure
- Yuki Amagi (天城 勇樹), a character in the manga series Legendz
- Yuki Aoyama (青山 ユウキ), a character in the anime series Chance Pop Session
- Yuki Cross (黒主 優姫), a character in the manga series Vampire Knight
- Yuuki Konno (紺野 木綿季), a character in the light novel series Sword Art Online
- Yūki Kusakabe (草壁 優季), a character in the visual novel To Heart 2
- Yuki Mitani (三谷 祐輝), a character in the manga series Hikaru no Go
- Yuki Nomura (野村 ユウキ), a character in the manga series No Bra
- Yuki Nonaka (野中 柚希), a character in the light novel series The Testament of Sister New Devil
- Yūki Nozaki (野崎 夕姫), a character in the game series Cinderella Nine
- Yūki Onozawa (小野沢 悠貴), a character in the anime series Tokyo Magnitude 8.0
- Yuuki Sakurano (さくら野 結城), a character in the anime series Sky Girls
- Yuuki Shibayama (芝山 優生), a character in the anime series Haikyu!!
- Yūki Terumi (ユウキ＝テルミ), a character in the video game series BlazBlue
- Yuki Tsukumo (九十九 由基), a character in the anime series Jujutsu Kaisen
