= Yuki Ono =

Yuki Ono may refer to:

- Yūki Ono (小野 友樹, born 1984), Japanese voice actor and singer
- Yūki Ōno (大野 勇樹, born 1985), Japanese wrestler

== See also ==
- Yuki Onodera
- Yoko Ono
- Yoko Ono (judoka)
- Yūko Ōno
- Yuji Ohno
- Yukari Ohno
- Yuki Onishi
- Yuki (given name)
- Yuki (disambiguation)
- Ono (surname)
- Ono (disambiguation)
