= Kikumoto =

Kikumoto (written: 菊本) is a Japanese surname. Notable people with the surname include:

- Tadao Kikumoto, Japanese engineer
- Yuki Kikumoto (菊本 侑希, born 1993), Japanese footballer
