= Saotome =

In ancient Japan, the saotome (“early maiden” 早乙女) were unmarried girls tasked with planting rice in paddies for Ta-no-Kami.

Saotome is also a Japanese family name. It may refer to:

== People ==
- Mitsugi Saotome, aikido master instructor
- Taichi Saotome, traditional Japanese stage actor
- Yuki Saotome (早乙女 友貴; born 1996), Japanese actor

== Fictional characters ==
- Ako Saotome from Aikatsu Stars!
- Alto Saotome from Macross Frontier
- Genma, Nodoka, and Ranma Saotome from Ranma ½
- Haruna Saotome from Negima! Magister Negi Magi
- Jin Saotome from Cyberbots: Full Metal Madness
- Junko Saotome, a supporting character from the manga series NANA
- Makoto Saotome from Kannazuki no Miko
- Mary Saotome from Kakegurui
- Mondonosuke Saotome a.k.a. Bored Hatamoto from the series of movies starring Utaemon Ichikawa and later his son Kin'ya Kitaōji
- Otome Saotome from Shimoneta
- Rei Saotome from Yu-Gi-Oh! GX
- Yae Saotome from Saotome Senshu, Hitakakusu
- Yoichi Saotome from Seraph of the End

== See also ==
- Saotomea, a genus of sea snails
- São Tomé (disambiguation)
