= Konagaya =

Konagaya (written: 小長谷) is a Japanese surname. Notable people with the surname include:

- Yuki Konagaya (小長谷 有紀, born 1957), Japanese academic
- Yuta Konagaya (小長谷 勇太, born 1993), Japanese footballer
