= Yuki Kato =

Yuki Kato may refer to:

- Yuki Kato (geisha) (加藤 ユキ, 1881–1963), Japanese wife of Pierpont Morgan's nephew
- Yuki Kato (athlete) (加藤 有希), Japanese Paralympic athlete
- Yuki Kato (actress) (born 1995), Indonesian actress
- Yūki Katō (footballer) (加藤 有輝, born 1997), Japanese footballer
