= Yūki (surname) =

Yūki (written: 結城, 夕樹, 結木, etc.) is a Japanese surname. Notable people with the surname include:

- Aira Yuhki (born 1981), Japanese singer
- Yuki Hide a.k.a. Hideyuki Hirano (1940–1998), Japanese singer
- Yūki Hideyasu (1574–1607), Japanese daimyō
- Hiro Yūki (born 1965), Japanese voice actor
- Kousei Yuki (結木 滉星, born 1994), Japanese actor
- Masahiko Yuki (born 1975), Japanese guitarist
- Yūki Masakatsu (1503–1559), Japanese samurai
- Nobuteru Yūki (born 1962), Japanese manga artist, illustrator, and animator
- Satoshi Yuki (born 1972), Japanese Go player
- Satoshi Yūki (結城 智史), a pseudonym of Kouji Miura (b. 1995), a Japanese manga artist
- Shoji Yuki (結城 昭二, born 1950), Japanese basketball player

== Fictional characters ==
- Akira Yuki, the main character in the game series Virtua Fighter
- Asuna Yuuki, a character in the light novel series Sword Art Online
- Jaden Yuki, the main character in the anime series Yu-Gi-Oh! GX
- Mikan Yuuki, a character in theTo Love Ru manga series
- Ringo Yuuki, a character in theTo Love Ru manga series
- Rito Yuuki, a character in theTo Love Ru manga series
- Saibai Yuuki, a character in theTo Love Ru manga series

== See also ==
- Yūki clan
