= Yukiko =

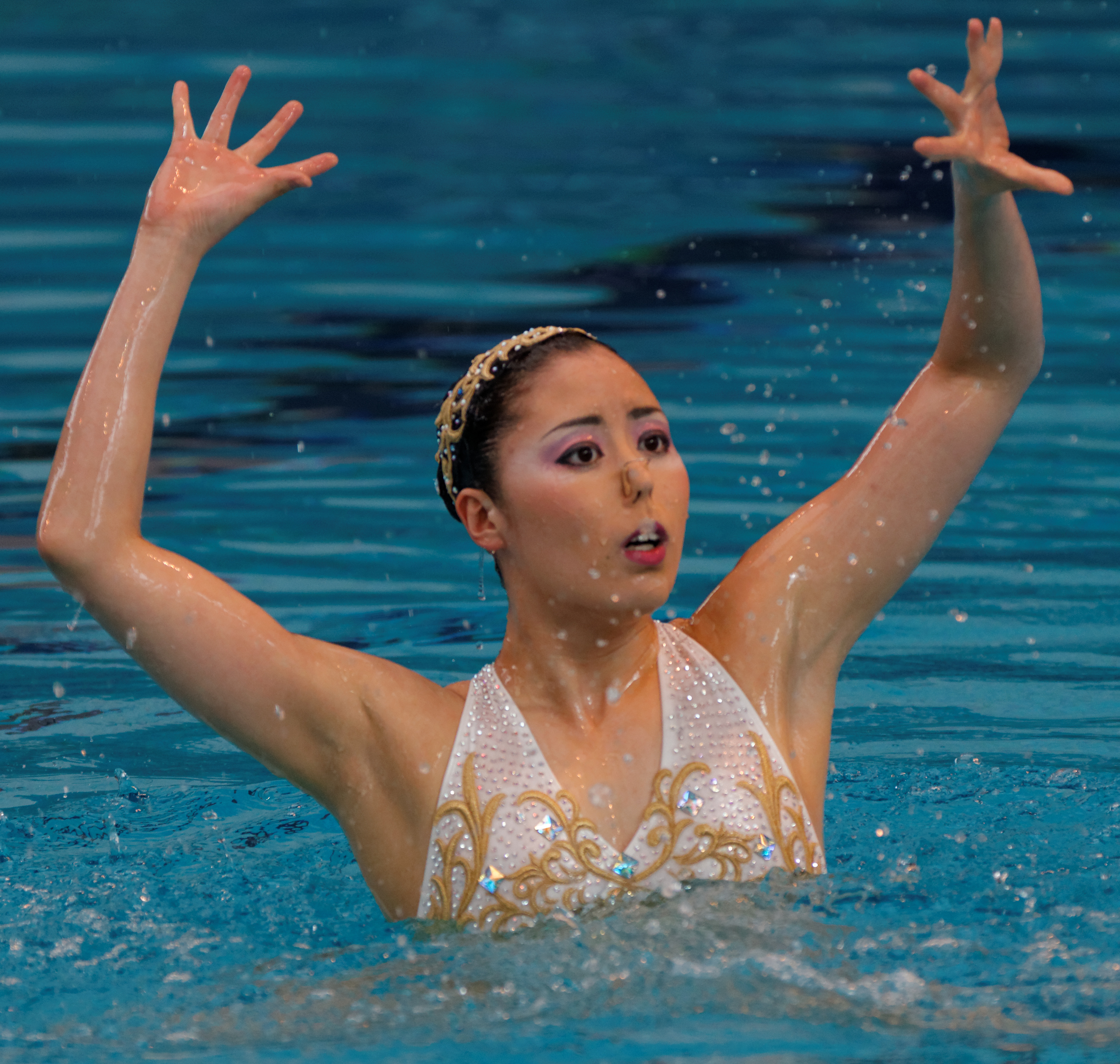
- Yukiko Inui, Japanese synchronized swimmer. French Open in Montreuil, March 16, 2013.
- Pronunciation: jɯkʲiko (IPA)
- Gender: Female
- Language: Japanese

Origin
- Meaning: Multiple meanings depending on the kanji used
- Region of origin: Japan

Other names
- Alternative spelling: Yukiko (Kunrei-shiki) Yukiko (Nihon-shiki) Yukiko (Hepburn)

Yukiko is a feminine Japanese given name.

== Written forms ==
Yukiko can be written using different combinations of kanji characters. Here are some examples:

- 雪子, "snow, child"
- 幸子, "happiness, child"
- 由紀子, "reason, chronicle, child"
- 由起子, "reason, to rise, child"
- 有紀子, "possession, chronicle, child"
- 有希子, "possession, hope, child"
- 夕紀子, "evening, chronicle, child"

The name can also be written in hiragana ゆきこ or katakana ユキコ.

== Notable people with the name ==
- Princess Yukiko (幸子女王; 1680–1720), was an empress consort of Emperor Higashiyama of Japan
- Yukiko Akaba (赤羽 有紀子; born 1979), Japanese long-distance runner
- Yukiko Duke (born 1966), Swedish translator, journalist, editor and presenter
- Yukiko Ebata (江畑 幸子; born 1989), Japanese retired volleyball player
- Yukiko Ehara (江原 由希子; born 1964), Japanese television personality actress, former singer and model
- Yukiko Fujisawa (藤澤 亮子; born 1995), Japanese figure skater
- Yukiko Goda, Japanese molecular biologist
- Yukiko Goushi (合志 幸子; born 1951), Japanese former backstroke swimmer
- Yukiko Haneda (羽根田 征子; born 1966), Japanese singer
- Yukiko Horiguchi (堀口 悠紀子; born 1983), Japanese animator and illustrator
- Yukiko Ikeda (池田 裕紀子; born 1971), Japanese archer
- Yukiko Inoue (井上 雪子; 1915–2012), Japanese actress
- Yukiko Inui (乾 友紀子; born 1990), Japanese synchronized swimmer
- Yukiko Ishizaka (石坂 有紀子; born 1968), Japanese beach volleyball player
- Yukiko Iwai (voice actress) (岩居 由希子; born 1972), Japanese voice actress
- Yukiko Iwai (Onyanko Club) (岩井 由紀子; born 1968), Japanese singer, actress and former member of the all-female J-pop group Onyanko Club
- Yukiko Jinbo (神保 雪子; 1845-1868), Japanese noble lady
- Yukiko Kada (嘉田 由紀子; born 1950), the governor of Shiga Prefecture, Japan
- Yukiko Kai (花郁 悠紀子; 1954–1980), Japanese manga artist
- Yukiko Kashihara (柏原 由紀子; born 1971), retired Japanese competitive figure skater
- Yukiko Kashiwagi (柏木 由紀子; born 1947), Japanese actress
- Yukiko Kato (加藤 幸子; 1936–2024), Japanese writer
- Yukiko Kawamorita, Japanese former international table tennis player
- Yukiko Kawasaki (川崎 由紀子; born 1977), Japanese figure skater
- Yukiko Kawashima (川島 有紀子; born 1996), Japanese ice hockey player
- Yukiko Kinoshita (木下 有希子; born 1993), Japanese member of SKE48
- Yukiko Kobayashi (小林 夕岐子; born 1946), Japanese actress
- Yukiko Koga (born 1969), Japanese anthropologist
- Yukiko Maki (1902–1989), Japanese educator
- Yukiko Mishima (三島 有紀子; born 1969), Japanese film director
- Yukiko Miyake (三宅 雪子; 1965–2020), Japanese politician
- Yukiko Motoya (本谷 有希子; born 1979), Japanese writer, playwright and theatre director
- Yukiko Ogawa (小川 由希子; born 1975), Japanese materials science researcher
- Yukiko Okada (岡田 有希子; 1967–1986), former Japanese pop singer
- Yukiko Okamoto (actress) (岡元 夕紀子; born 1979), Japanese singer
- Yukiko Okamoto (athlete) (岡本 幸子; born 1979), Japanese female distance runner
- Yukiko Osada (長田 友喜子; born 1981), retired Japanese swimmer who specialized in the butterfly stroke
- Yukiko Otaka (大高 幸子; born 1940), Japanese swimmer
- Yukiko Sakamoto (坂本 由紀子; born 1949), Japanese politician and member of the Liberal Democratic Party
- Yukiko Shimazaki (島崎 雪子; 1931–2014), Japanese actress and singer
- Yukiko Shinozaki, Japanese dancer and choreographer
- Yukiko Sugawara (菅原 幸子), Japanese pianist
- Yukiko Sumiyoshi (住吉 文子; born 1982), Japanese manga author
- Yukiko Takaguchi (高口 幸子; born 1974), Japanese voice actress
- Yukiko Takahashi (高橋 有紀子; born 1967), Japanese former volleyball and beach volleyball player
- Yukiko Takahata (高畑 祐紀子; born 1998), Japanese badminton player
- Yukiko Takayama (高山 由紀子; died 2023), Japanese screenwriter and director
- Yukiko Tamaki (玉木 有紀子; born 1980), Japanese voice actress
- Yukiko Todoroki (轟 夕起子; 1917–1967), Japanese former actress
- Yukiko Tomoe (巴 ゆき子; born 1935), Japanese retired professional wrestler
- Yukiko Tsukuba (筑波 雪子; 1906–1977), Japanese actress
- Yukiko Ueno (上野 由岐子; born 1982), Japanese softball pitcher
- Yukiko Umeno (梅野 倖子; born 2003), Japanese racewalking athlete
- Yukiko Yamashita (山下 幸子; born 1972), American developmental biologist
- Yukiko Yoshida (吉田 起子; born 1989), Japanese female handballer

== Fictional characters ==
- Yukiko Amagi (天城 雪子), character from Persona 4
- Yukiko Date (ユキコ・ダテ), a character in Super Robot Wars: Original Generations
- Yukiko Hirohara (広原 雪子), character in the 11 Eyes manga and anime series
- Yukiko Kitano (北野 雪子), character from the novel, manga and film Battle Royale
- Yukiko Kudō (工藤 有希子), character in the Detective Conan manga and anime series
- Yukiko Steavens (ユキコ・スティーブンス), character in the Gun Sword anime series
- Yukiko Kanzaki (神崎 有希子), character from the Assassination Classroom manga and anime series
- Yukiko Satō (佐藤 雪子), character from The Station Master, a novel by Jirō Asada, which was made into a movie: Poppoya, Railroad Man
