= Yuki Sato =

Yuki Sato may refer to:

- Yuki Sato (actor) (佐藤祐基; born 1984), Japanese actor
- Yuki Sato (footballer) (佐藤 悠希; born 1988), Japanese footballer
- Yuki Sato (runner) (佐藤 悠基; born 1986), Japanese long-distance runner
- Yuki Sato (sepak takraw) (佐藤 優樹; born 1988), Japanese sepak takraw player
- Yuki Sato (softball) (佐藤 由希; born 1980), Japanese softball player
- Yuki Sato (voice actor) (佐藤 佑暉), Japanese voice actor
- Yuki Sato (wrestler) (佐藤 悠己; born 1985), Japanese professional wrestler
