= Yukiko Goda =

Japanese molecular biologist and academic

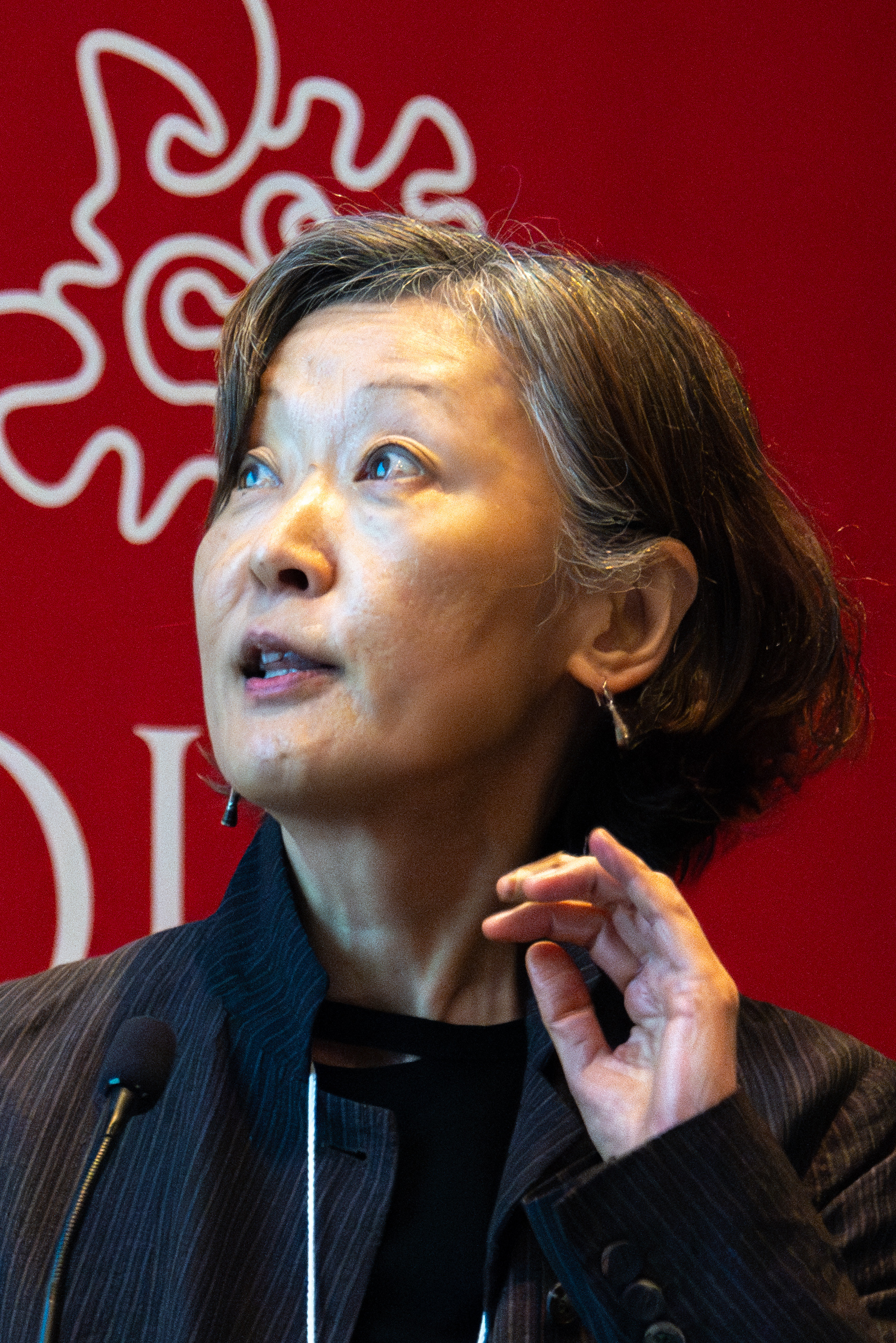
- Goda in 2024
- Born: Osaka
- Education: Stanford University
- Scientific career
- Workplaces: Salk Institute; Cold Spring Harbor Laboratory; University of California, San Diego; University College London; Riken
- Thesis: Molecular analysis of vesicular transport from endosomes to the trans Golgi network (1990)
- Academic advisors: Charles F. Stevens

Yukiko Goda is a Japanese molecular biologist who is a professor and group leader at the Okinawa Institute of Science and Technology. Her research considers neural communication through synapses. She was elected a Member of the European Molecular Biology Organization in 2023.

== Early life ==
Goda was born in Osaka, but grew up between Japan and Canada because her father worked in a trading company. She was at high school in Toronto, and secured a scholarship to attend the University of Toronto. Despite initially considering literature, Goda became interested in science during her undergraduate studies, and spent her summer holidays on research placements in chemistry and biology. She worked in Jack Greenblatt's laboratory, where she studied bacteriophage transcription. She trained in cell biology, and completed her doctoral research at Stanford University with Suzanne Pfeffer, where she studied vesicular transport from endosomes to the Golgi complex. She completed a course on developmental neurobiology at Cold Spring Harbor Laboratory, where she learned that Stevens' group were investigating synaptic plasticity in vivo. Goda moved to the Salk Institute for Biological Studies as a postdoctoral researcher with Charles F. Stevens, where she specialised in electrophysiology, and studied how neurons alter their synaptic strengths. Goda eventually set up her own laboratory at University of California, San Diego. In 2001, she moved to the Medical Research Council at University College London.

== Research and career ==
In 2011, Goda returned to Japan, where she established her own research group at Riken. She joined the Okinawa Institute of Science and Technology in 2022. Her research has uncovered the processes involved in trans-synaptic interactions. Goda has dedicated her career to understanding the molecular mechanisms of synaptic function, including synaptic homeostasis and other types of plasticity.

== Awards and honours ==
- 2013 Tsukahara Memorial Award
- 2014 Elected to the Science Council of Japan
- 2023 Elected to the European Molecular Biology Organization

== Selected publications ==
- Karine Pozo; Yukiko Goda (1 May 2010). "Unraveling mechanisms of homeostatic synaptic plasticity". Neuron. 66 (3): 337–351. doi:10.1016/j.neuron.2010.04.028. ISSN 0896-6273. PMC 3021747. PMID 20471348. Wikidata Q37752834.
- Martin Geppert; Yukiko Goda; Robert E. Hammer; Cai Li; Thomas W. Rosahl; Charles F. Stevens; Thomas C. Südhof (18 November 1994). "Synaptotagmin I: a major Ca2+ sensor for transmitter release at a central synapse". Cell. 79 (4): 717–727. doi:10.1016/0092-8674(94)90556-8. ISSN 0092-8674. PMID 7954835. Wikidata Q28587672.
- Lorenzo A Cingolani; Yukiko Goda (1 May 2008). "Actin in action: the interplay between the actin cytoskeleton and synaptic efficacy". Nature Reviews Neuroscience. 9 (5): 344–356. doi:10.1038/nrn2373. ISSN 1471-003X. PMID 18425089. Wikidata Q37143121.
