= Yuki Station =

Yuki Station may refer to any of the following railway stations in Japan:

- Yuki Station (Hiroshima) (油木駅)
- Yuki Station (Tokushima) (由岐駅)
- Yūki Station (結城駅)
