= Yukimura =

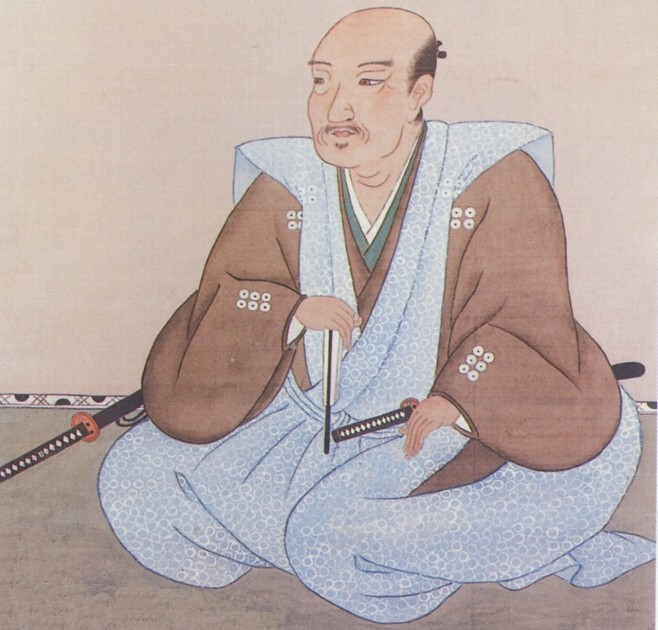
- Yukimura Sanada (1567–1615), Japanese samurai
- Pronunciation: jɯkʲimɯɾa (IPA)

Origin
- Origin: Japanese

Yukimura is a masculine Japanese given name and a Japanese surname.

== Written forms ==
Yukimura can be written using different combinations of kanji characters. Here are some examples:

- 幸村, "happiness, village"
- 幸斑, "happiness, speck"
- 幸邑, "happiness, village"
- 行村, "to go, village"
- 行斑, "to go, speck"
- 行邑, "to go, village"
- 恭村, "respectful, village"
- 之村, "of, village"
- 雪村, "snow, village"
- 雪斑, "snow, speck"
- 雪邑, "snow, village"

The name can also be written in hiragana ゆきむら or katakana ユキムラ.

== Notable people with the given name Yukimura ==
- Yukimura Sanada (1567–1615), Japanese samurai

== Notable people with the surname Yukimura ==
- Eri Yukimura (幸村 恵理, born 1998), Japanese voice actress
- Izumi Yukimura (雪村 いづみ, born 1937), Japanese singer and actress
- Makoto Yukimura (幸村 誠, born 1976), Japanese manga artist

== Fictional characters ==
- Tokine Yukimura (雪村 時音), a main character in Kekkaishi
- Keiko Yukimura (雪村 螢子), a character in the YuYu Hakusho series
- Yukimura (幸村), one of Weed's brothers in Ginga Legend Weed
- Anzu Yukimura (雪村 杏), a character from Da Capo II
- Seiichi Yukimura (幸村 精市), a character from The Prince of Tennis
- Kira Yukimura (キラ・ユキムラ), a character from Teen Wolf (2011 TV series)
- Yukimura Kusunoki (楠 幸村), a character from Haganai
- Tooru Yukimura (雪村 透), a character from Aoharu x Machinegun
- Aguri Yukimura (雪村 あぐり), a character from Assassination Classroom
- Chizuru Yukimura (雪村 千鶴), a character from Hakuouki
- Yukimura (ユキムラ), a character from Fire Emblem Fates

== Places ==
- Yukimura (restaurant), Michelin 3-star sushi restaurant in Azabu-Jūban, Minato, Tokyo, Japan
