= Yūki Masakatsu =

Japanese samurai (1503–1559)

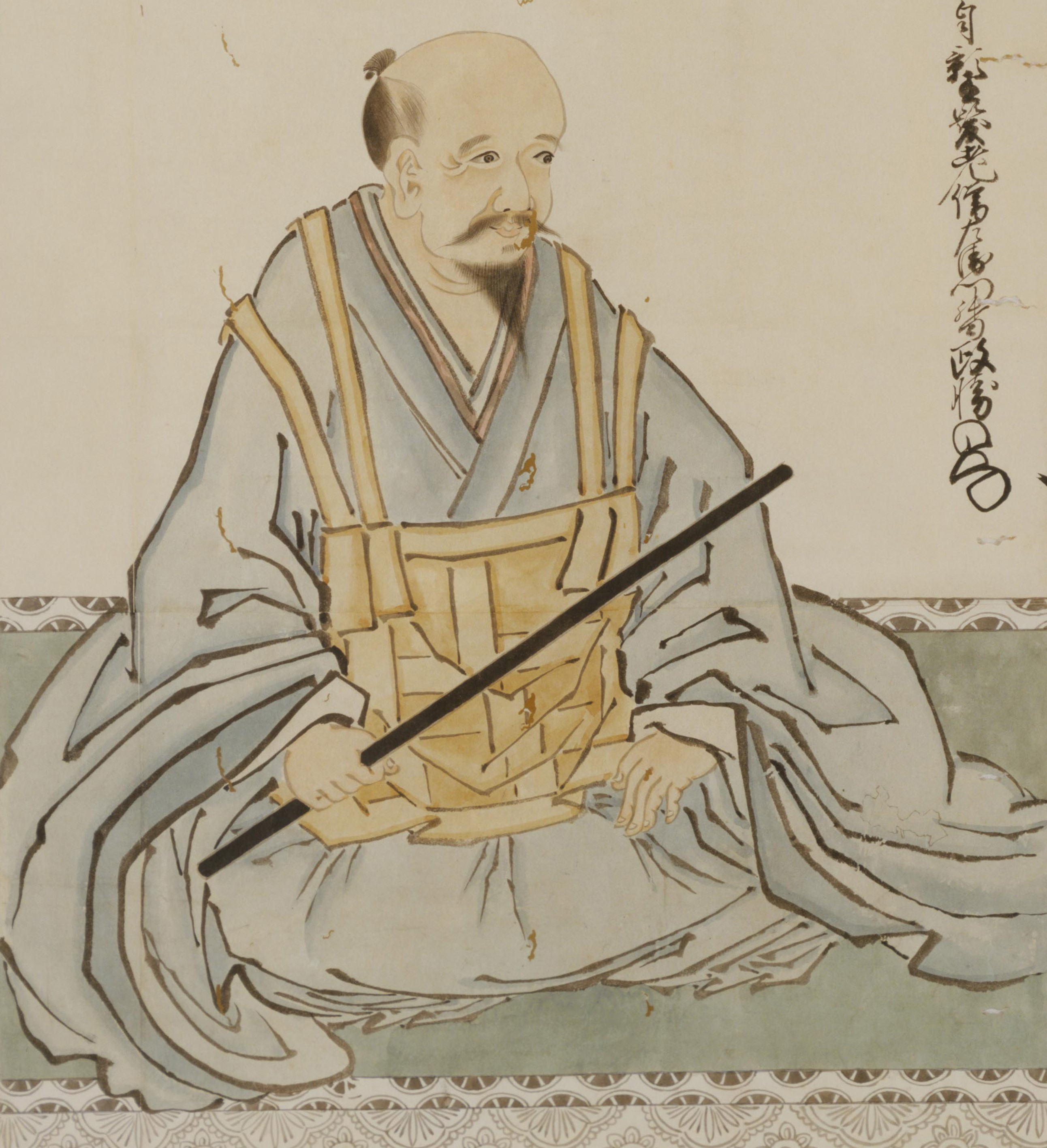
Yuuki Masakatsu

Yūki Masakatsu (結城 政勝; 1503 – September 2, 1559) was a Japanese samurai during the Sengoku period. He was the head of the Yūki clan.

== Early life ==
He was the son of Yūki Masatomo.

== Daimyo ==
As clan leader, Masakatsu developed a code of provincial laws (bunkoku-hō). In 1556, he published "new laws of the Yūki family" (結城氏法度, Yūki-shi Hatto).
