= Yuki Konagaya =

Japanese cultural anthropologist

- Born: November 7, 1957; Japan Toyonaka, Osaka Prefecture
- Other name: 小長谷 有紀
- Occupation: Anthropologist (Ethnology)

Yuki Konagaya (小長谷 有紀, Konagaya Yuki; born November 7, 1957 in Toyonaka, Osaka) is a Japanese professor specializing in the history and cultural anthropology of Central Asia and Mongolia.

== Biography ==
Yuki Konagaya was born in Toyonaka, Osaka Prefecture in 1957. She entered Kyoto University, Faculty of Letters. She went to Mongolian People's Republic as the first female international student and studied at National University of Mongolia in September 1979 (one year). She completed a Bachelor's degree in 1981 and a Master's degree in 1983.

She became a researcher at the National Museum of Ethnology, and visited Inner Mongolia for her research. She was promoted to assistant professor in 1983 and became a professor in 2003. She served as the director of National Institutes for the Humanities from 2014. From 2020 to 2023, she was an inspector of Japan Society for the Promotion of Science.

She is currently a researcher of Tōyō Bunko. She is also the President of the International Association for Mongol Studies.

== Publications ==
- Konagaya, Y., Lkhagvasu̇rėn, I., & Rossabi, M. (2011). Socialist devotees and dissenters: Three twentieth-century Mongolian leaders. Osaka: National Museum of Ethnology.
- Konagaya, Y., Lkhagvasu̇rėn, I., & Rossabi, M. (2014). Mongolia's transition from socialism to captitalism: Four views. Suita-shi: Kokuritsu Minzokugaku Hakubutsukan, Heisei 26.
- Konagaya, Y. (2016). Northeast Asian borders: History, politics, and local societies. Osaka: National Museum of Ethnology.

== Awards and honors ==
- 2025 - Person of Cultural Merit
