= Yūki Katō (footballer) =

Japanese footballer

Personal information
- Date of birth: 20 September 1997 (age 29)
- Place of birth: Ina, Saitama, Japan
- Height: 1.87 m (6 ft 2 in)
- Position: Goalkeeper

Team information
- Current team: RB Omiya Ardija
- Number: 21

Youth career
- Ina Kobari SSS
- 2010–2019: Omiya Ardija

Senior career*
Years	Team	Apps	(Gls)
2019–	RB Omiya Ardija	16	(0)
2021–2023	→ Giravanz Kitakyushu (loan)	30	(0)
- * Club domestic league appearances and goals as of 23:14, 8 December 2025 (UTC)

Yūki Katō (加藤 有輝, Katō Yūki; born 20 September 1997) is a Japanese professional footballer who plays as a goalkeeper for J2 League club RB Omiya Ardija.

== Career statistics ==
As of match played 7 December 2025

Appearances and goals by club, season and competition
Club	Season	League			Emperor's Cup		J.League Cup		Other		Total	
Club	Season	Division	Apps	Goals	Apps	Goals	Apps	Goals	Apps	Goals	Apps	Goals
RB Omiya Ardija	2019	J2 League	10	0	1	0	0	0	0	0	11	0
RB Omiya Ardija	2020	J2 League	0	0	0	0	0	0	0	0	0	0
RB Omiya Ardija	2024	J3 League	0	0	0	0	2	0	0	0	2	0
RB Omiya Ardija	2025	J2 League	6	0	1	0	2	0	1 (Note: Appearance in J2 League promotion play-offs)	0	10	0
RB Omiya Ardija	Total		16	0	2	0	4	0	1	0	23	0
Giravanz Kitakyushu (loan)	2021	J2 League	5	0	1	0	0	0	0	0	6	0
Giravanz Kitakyushu (loan)	2022	J3 League	17	0	0	0	0	0	0	0	17	0
Giravanz Kitakyushu (loan)	2023	J3 League	8	0	0	0	0	0	0	0	8	0
Giravanz Kitakyushu (loan)	Total		30	0	1	0	0	0	0	0	31	0
Career total			46	0	3	0	4	0	1	0	54	0
