= Yuki Kikumoto =

Japanese footballer

Personal information
- Full name: Yuki Kikumoto
- Date of birth: July 10, 1993 (age 33)
- Place of birth: Yamaguchi, Japan
- Height: 1.67 m (5 ft 5 1/2 in)
- Position: Defender

Youth career
- 2009–2011: Avispa Fukuoka
- 2012–2013: Chukyo University

Senior career*
Years	Team	Apps	(Gls)
2014–2015	Renofa Yamaguchi FC	23	(0)
2016	Briobecca Urayasu	0	(0)
2018–2019	LAAC	26	(8)
Total		46	(8)
- * Club domestic league appearances and goals

Yuki Kikumoto (菊本 侑希, Kikumoto Yūki; born July 10, 1993) is a former Japanese football player.

== Playing career ==
Yuki Kikumoto joined to Renofa Yamaguchi FC in 2014. In 2016, he moved to Briobecca Urayasu.
