= Yūki clan =

Japanese samurai kin group

Yūki 結城
- Home province: Shimōsa; Mutsu
- Parent house: Ashikaga clan (Fujiwara)
- Founder: Yūki Tomomitsu
- Cadet branches: Yūki Shimōsa; Yūki Shirakawa

Yūki clan (結城氏, Yūki-shi) is a Japanese samurai kin group.

== History ==
The Yūki claim descent from Fujiwara no Hidesato.

The clan is composed of two branches: the Shimōsa Yūki and the Shirakawa Yūki. The split happened during the Nanboku-chō period. One branch supported the Southern Imperial Court, and the other branch the Northern Pretenders.

Like many samurai clans, the Yūki developed a code of provincial laws (bunkoku-hō). In 1556, Yūki Masakatsu published New Laws of the Yūki family (結城氏法度, Yūki-shi Hatto).

The Shirakawa branch was destroyed by Toyotomi Hideyoshi; but the Shimōsa branch survived as daimyōs of Yūki Domain in Shimōsa Province.

The Shimōsa Yūki became part of the Tokugawa clan.

The main samurai vassals of the Yūki (Yūki shi-ten) included the Tagaya clan, the Mizutani clan, the Yamakawa clan and the Iwakami clan.

== Select list ==
- Yūki Tomomitsu, 1168-1254, 1st head of Yūki Domain
- Yūki Tomohiro, son of Tomomitsu
- Yūki Hirotsugu, son of Tomohiro
- Yūki Sukehiro, son of Tomohiro at Shirakawa in Mutsu, 1298
- Yūki Munehiro, d. c. 1340
- Yūki Chikatomo, d. 1347
- Yūki Chikamitsu, d. 1336
- Yūki Akitomo, d. c. 1370, son of Chikatomo
- Yūki Ujitomo, 1398-1441
- Yūki Noritomo, 1439-1462
- Yūki Masatomo, 1477-1545
- Yūki Masakatsu, 1504-1559
- Yūki Harutomo, 1534-1616, adopted son of Oyama Taketomo
- Yūki Hideyasu, adopted son of Tokugawa Ieyasu
- Yūki Naomoto

== See also ==
- Yūki Kassen Ekotoba, scroll painting depicting Yūki Ujitomo's rebellion against the Ashikaga shogunate
