= Yuki Saotome =

Japanese actor (born 1996)

- 早乙女 友貴
- Born: 西村 友貴 (Nishimura Yūki); May 14, 1996 (age 29); Kitakyushu, Fukuoka, Japan
- Occupations: Actor; singer; Internet idol
- Years active: 1997 – present
- Agents: Gekidan Sujaku; Avex Management
- Height: 1.72 m (5 ft 8 in)
- Relatives: Taichi Saotome (brother); Maki Nishiyama (sister-in-law)
- Website: avex-management.jp/artists/SOTMY/ (in Japanese)

Yuki Saotome (早乙女 友貴, Saotome Yūki; born 14 May 1996) is a Japanese actor.

He is represented by Avex Management. Saotome was previously represented by Gekidan Sujaku until its dissolution.

== Biography ==
Saotome's height is 1.72 metres, and his shoe size is 27 centimetres. His skills are sword fighting and dancing nichibu.

Saotome is nicknamed Yukkun (ゆっくん).

He is good in table tennis and association football. Saotome's favorite food is meat, in particular grilled liver.

== Filmography ==
=== Stage ===
Year	Title	Role	Notes	Ref.
2010	Nemuri Kyoshirō			
2010	Yuki Saotome Buyō Show			
2012	Satomi Hakkenden	Inue Shinbee		
2013	Ryū to Botan 2013 Yukimura Sanada: Musuba Reshi Tamashī	Hanzo Hattori, Tsunamune Date		
2013	Shinshū Tenma Kyō	Ensaku		
2014	Aoi no Ran			
2014	Orenokataware: Sōten no Shō	Sanshiro Tokieda, Joe Kazamatsuri	Lead role	
2015	Trump	Sophie Anderson, Ur Deriko	Lead role; co-starring with Mahiro Takasugi	
2016	Tsumuru o Okami Kuroki Kamo	Yamakawa Hiroshi		

=== Variety series ===
Year	Title	Network
2012	Masahiro Nakai no Ayashī Uwasa no Atsumaru Toshokan	ABC
