= Yukie =

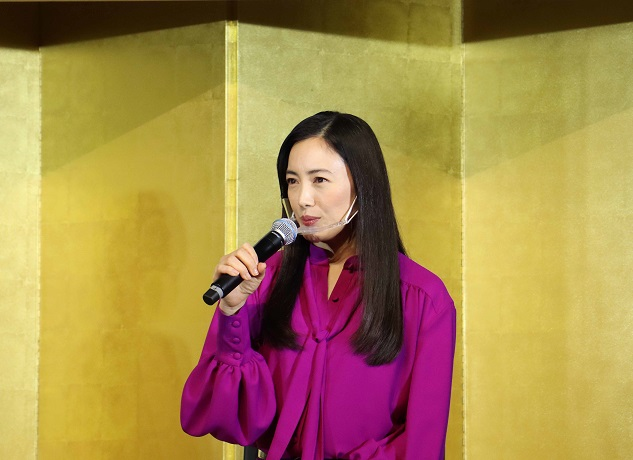
- Yukie Nakama. Japanese actress, singer and idol.
- Pronunciation: [jɯkie]
- Gender: Female

Origin
- Origin: Japanese
- Meaning: Depends on the kanji used

Other names
- Alternative spelling: Yukie (Kunrei-shiki) Yukie (Nihon-shiki) Yukie (Hepburn)

Yukie (or Yukié) is a feminine Japanese given name.

== Written forms ==
Yukie can be written using different combinations of kanji characters. Here are some examples:

- 幸恵, "happiness, blessing/favor"
- 幸栄, "happiness, prosperous"
- 幸江, "happiness, creek"
- 由紀恵, "reason, era, blessing"
- 由紀江, "reason, era, creek"
- 雪映, "snow, shine"
- 雪瑛, "snow, crystal"
- 雪絵, "snow, picture"
- 雪恵, "snow, blessing/favor"
- 雪枝, "snow, branch"
- 雪江, "snow, creek"

The name can also be written in hiragana ゆきえ or katakana ユキエ.

== Notable people with the name ==
- Yukie Arata (荒田 雪江, 1914 – date of death unknown), Japanese swimmer
- Yukie Chiri (知里 幸恵, 1903–1922), Japanese transcriber and translator
- Yukie Kawamura (川村 ゆきえ, born 1986), Japanese gravure idol, tarento and actress
- Yukie Koizumi (born 1958), Japanese former professional tennis player
- Yukie Nakama (仲間 由紀恵, born 1979), Japanese actress, singer and idol
- Yukie Nakayama| (中山 由起枝, born 1979), Japanese sport shooter
- Yukie Nishimura (西村 由紀江, born 1967), Japanese pianist
- Yukie Ohzeki (大関 行江, born 1949), Japanese table tennis player
- Yukie Sakaguchi (坂口 優希恵, born 1994), Japanese professional soft-tip and steel-tip darts player

== Notable people with the surname ==
- Hiroto Yukie (雪江 悠人, born 1996), Japanese footballer

== Fictional Characters ==
- Yukie Kaufmann (由季江・カウフマン), character in Message to Adolf (originally titled Adolf in English)
- Yukie Mayuzumi (黛 由紀江), character in Maji de Watashi ni Koi Shinasai! (Majikoi ~ Oh! Samurai Girls)
- Yukie Mishiro (三代 雪絵), a character from the light novel series Ginban Kaleidoscope
- Yukie Utsumi (内海 幸枝), character in the novel, film, and manga Battle Royale
- Yukie Shirofuku (白福 雪絵), a manager of Fukurōdani Academy in Haikyū!!
- Yukie, Kumiko's aunt and Mr Miyagi's lifelong love in Karate Kid 2, remembered in Cobra Kai Season 3.
