= Yuki Sato (footballer) =

Japanese footballer

Yuki Sato 佐藤 悠希
Personal information
- Full name: Yuki Sato
- Date of birth: February 13, 1988 (age 38)
- Place of birth: Nara, Japan
- Height: 1.81 m (5 ft 11 1/2 in)
- Positions: Forward; attacking midfielder

Team information
- Current team: FC Kariya
- Number: 9

Youth career
- 2000–2002: Tomio Junior HS
- 2003–2005: Nara Ikuei Gakuen HS
- 2006–2009: Kansai University

Senior career*
Years	Team	Apps	(Gls)
2010–2011	JEF Reserves	46	(10)
2012–2018	Nagano Parceiro	207	(40)
2019–	FC Kariya	14	(10)
- * Club domestic league appearances and goals as of 23 February 2020

Yuki Sato (佐藤 悠希, Satō Yūki; born February 13, 1988) is a Japanese football player for FC Kariya.

== Club statistics ==
Updated to 23 February 2020.

Club performance			League		Cup		Other		Total	
Season	Club	League	Apps	Goals	Apps	Goals	Apps	Goals	Apps	Goals
Japan			League		Emperor's Cup		Other^{1}		Total	
2010	JEF Reserves	JFL	24	2	-		-		24	2
2011	JEF Reserves	JFL	22	8	-		-		22	8
2012	Nagano Parceiro	JFL	28	2	3	0	-		31	2
2013	Nagano Parceiro	JFL	32	8	3	1	-		35	9
2014	Nagano Parceiro	J3 League	33	9	2	0	2	0	37	9
2015	Nagano Parceiro	J3 League	36	12	1	0	-		37	12
2016	Nagano Parceiro	J3 League	30	7	2	0	-		32	7
2017	Nagano Parceiro	J3 League	29	2	3	1	-		32	3
2018	Nagano Parceiro	J3 League	19	0	2	2	-		21	2
2019	FC Kariya	JRL (Tōkai, Div. 1)	14	10	1	0	-		15	10
Total			267	60	17	4	2	0	286	64

^{1}Includes Promotion Playoffs to J2.
