= Yukio =

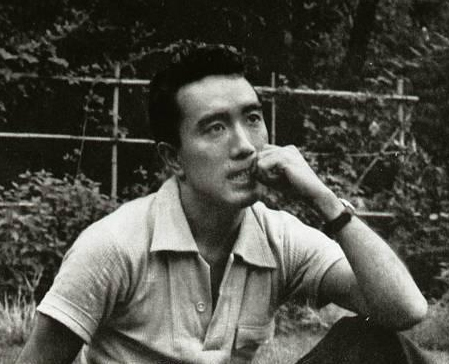
- Yukio Mishima (1925–1970), Japanese writer.
- Pronunciation: Japanese: [jɯkʲio]
- Gender: Male

Origin
- Origin: Japanese
- Meaning: Different meanings depending on the kanji used

Other names
- Alternative spelling: Yukio (Kunrei-shiki) Yukio (Nihon-shiki) Yukio (Hepburn)

Yukio is a masculine Japanese given name, commonly used as a feminine given name in works of fiction.

== Written forms ==
Yukio can be written using different combinations of kanji characters. Here are some examples:

- 幸夫, "happiness, man"
- 幸生, "happiness, live"
- 幸男, "happiness, man"
- 幸雄, "happiness, male"
- 行夫, "to go, man"
- 行男, "to go, man"
- 行雄, "to go, male"
- 之夫, "of, man"
- 之男, "of, man"
- 之雄, "of, male"
- 由起夫, "reason, to rise, man"
- 由紀夫, "reason, chronicle, man"
- 由記雄, "reason, scribe, male"
- 悠紀夫, "long time, chronicle, man"
- 雪雄, "snow, male"

The name can also be written in hiragana ゆきお or katakana ユキオ.

== Notable people with the name ==
- Yukio Akagariyama (赤狩山 幸男; born 1975), Japanese pocket billiards player
- Yukio Aki (阿木 由紀夫; 1930–2015), pseudonym of Akiyuki Nosaka (野坂 昭如), Japanese novelist, singer, lyricist, and politician
- Yukio Aoshima (青島 幸男; 1932–2006), Japanese politician who was Governor of Tokyo
- Yukio Arai (荒井 幸雄; born 1964), Japanese baseball player
- Yukio Araki (荒木 幸雄; 1928–1945), youngest-known Japanese Kamikaze pilot killed in World War II
- Yukio Edano (枝野 幸男; born 1964), Japanese politician
- Yukio Endō (遠藤 幸雄; 1937–2009), Japanese gymnast
- Yukio Futatsugi (二木 幸生; born 1970), Japanese video game developer
- Yukio Furuyama (古山 征男; born 1938), Japanese equestrian
- Yukio Hashi (橋 幸夫; 1943–2025), Japanese popular singer
- Yukio Hatoyama (鳩山 由紀夫; born 1947), Japanese Prime Minister
- Yukio Hattori (服部 幸應; born 1945), Japanese cook and television presenter
- Yukio Horigome (堀籠 幸男; born 1940), Japanese lawyer
- Yukio Iketani (池谷 幸雄; born 1970), Japanese gymnast
- Yukio Jitsukawa (実川 幸夫; born 1943), Japanese politician
- Yukio Kagayama (加賀山 就臣; born 1974), Japanese motorcycle racer
- Yukio Kasahara (笠原 幸雄; 1889–1988), Japanese soldier
- Yukio Kasaya (笠谷 幸生; born 1943), Japanese ski jumper
- Yukio Matsuda (松田 征男; born 1942), Japanese rower
- Yukio Mishima (三島 由紀夫; 1925–1970), Japanese writer
- Yukio Motoki (元木 由記雄; born 1971), Japanese rugby football player
- Yukio Ninagawa (蜷川 幸雄; 1935–2016), Japanese theatre director
- Yukio Odagiri (小田桐 幸雄; born 1956), Japanese boxer
- Yukio Okutsu (1921–2003), Hawaiian soldier who won the US Congressional Medal of Honor
- Yukio Ozaki (尾崎 行雄; 1859–1954), Japanese politician
- Yukio Ozaki (artist) (born 1948) Japanese-born American visual artist
- Yukio Peter (born 1984), Nauruan weightlifter
- Yukio Roho (露鵬 幸生; born 1980), Russian sumo wrestler
- Yukio Sakaguchi (坂口 征夫; born 1973), Japanese mixed martial artist and professional wrestler
- Yukio Segawa (瀬川 幸雄; born 1954), Japanese boxer
- Yukio Seki (関 行男; 1921–1944), Japanese naval aviator who led the first official kamikaze attack
- Yukio Shimoda (1921–1981), American actor
- Yukio Shmull (died 2018), Palauan politician
- Yukio Tabuchi (田淵 行男; 1905-1989), Japanese photographer
- Yukio Takeuchi (竹内 行夫; born 1943), Japanese Supreme Court justice
- Yukio Tanaka (田中 幸雄; born 1967), Japanese baseball player
- Yukio Tani (谷 幸雄; 1881-1950), Japanese judoka
- Yukio Tomioka (富岡 由紀夫; born 1964), Japanese politician
- Yukio Tsuchiya (土屋 征夫; born 1974), Japanese musician
- Yukio Yamaji (山地 悠紀夫; 1983-2009), Japanese murderer
- Yukio Yung, pseudonym of Terry Burrows, English writer and musician

== Fictional characters ==
- Yukio (雪緒), a heroine in the X-Men comics
- Yukio, female character in the Eric Van Lustbader novel, The Ninja
- Yukio Haibara (灰原 由起夫) (Johnny) in the anime Mahoraba
- Yukio Mashimi in the anime Teenage Mutant Ninja Turtles
- Yukio Oikawa (及川 悠紀夫) in the anime Digimon
- Yukio Tanaka (田中 幸雄) in the manga Beck
- Yukio Okumura (奥村 雪男), the twin character of the main protagonist Rin Okumura from the anime/manga, Blue Exorcist
- Yukio Washimine (鷲峰 雪緒), a character from the anime/manga, Black Lagoon
- Yukio Tonegawa (利根川 幸雄), one of the main antagonists in the anime/manga, Kaiji
- Yukio Hirayama (平山 幸雄), also known as "Fake Akagi", a character from the anime/manga, Akagi
- Yukio Hidaka (ヒダカ・ユキオ), a character from the anime Gundam Build Divers
- Yuki "Yukio" ("Yuki O.") Ohara, a character in the Deadpool film series and the Negasonic Teenage Warhead comic-book series

== Other ==
- 5513 Yukio, asteroid
- "Death and Night and Blood (Yukio)", a song by The Stranglers from Black and White
