= Yuki Kato (geisha) =

Geisha (1881–1963)

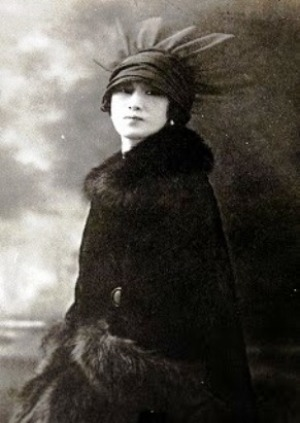
Yuki Kato Morgan in Paris

Yuki Kato (加藤ユキ), also known as Morgan O-Yuki (モルガンお雪) (Kyoto, August 7, 1881 - May 18, 1963), was a Japanese geisha who married George Denison Morgan, nephew of Pierpont Morgan of the Morgan banking dynasty.

== History with Morgans ==
Yuki Kato was the daughter of a samurai swordsmith. As a Gion geisha, she was known as "Kokyū no Sekka" (胡弓の雪香) for her "sublime" performances on the traditional kokyū instrument. George Morgan arrived in Japan in 1902 and saw Yuki performing at Miyako Odori geisha theater. He courted Yuki for two years, paid her debt to the Okiya house for $20,000.00 and married her in 1904.

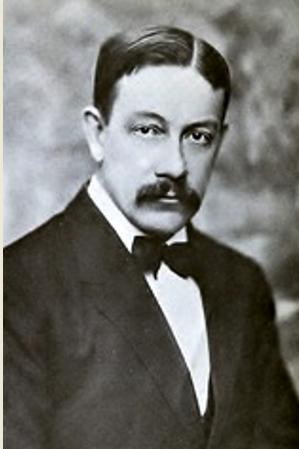
George Denison Morgan

It was reported to the Morgan family in the US that the young lady he married came from an excellent family. However, according to some accounts of their reception in the US, she was rejected and ostracized by the Morgans. She accompanied Morgan to Paris, France. He died of heart failure in Spain in 1915.

Yuki then returned to Kyoto in 1938 and became a Roman Catholic in 1953, taking the Christian name "Theresa" in honor of her favorite saint, Thérèse of Lisieux. During this time, Kato experienced close police surveillance. The Morgan family found Yuki after the Second World War and supported her. She became well known in Japan as a result of a 1951 musical based on her life. She never had children. She was buried in Kyoto.
