= 2015 Jeonbuk Hyundai Motors season =

Jeonbuk Hyundai Motors
2015 season
- Chairman: Chung Eui-sun
- Manager: Choi Kang-hee
- K League Classic: 1st
- Korean FA Cup: Round of 16
- Champions League: Quarter-finals
- Top goalscorer: League: Lee Dong-gook (13); All: Lee Dong-gook (18)
Home colours	Away colours

The 2015 season was Jeonbuk Hyundai Motors' twenty-first season in the K League Classic in South Korea. Jeonbuk Hyundai Motors also competed in the Korean FA Cup and AFC Champions League.

== Current squad ==
As of 5 January 2015

Note: Flags indicate national team as defined under FIFA eligibility rules; some limited exceptions apply. Players may hold more than one non-FIFA nationality.

No.	Pos.	Nation	Player
1	GK	KOR	Kwon Sun-tae
3	DF	KOR	Kim Hyung-il
4	MF	KOR	Kim Kee-hee
5	MF	KOR	Lee Ho
6	DF	KOR	Choi Bo-kyung
7	MF	KOR	Han Kyo-won
8	MF	BRA	Eninho
9	FW	BRA	Edu
10	MF	BRA	Leonardo
11	MF	KOR	Lee Seung-hyun
13	MF	KOR	Jung Hoon
14	FW	KOR	Lee Seung-yeoul
16	DF	KOR	Cho Sung-hwan
17	MF	KOR	Lee Jae-sung
18	DF	AUS	Alex Wilkinson
19	DF	KOR	Park Won-jae
20	FW	KOR	Lee Dong-gook (Captain)
21	GK	KOR	Hong Jeong-nam

No.	Pos.	Nation	Player
22	FW	KOR	Lee Sang-hyup
23	FW	KOR	Kim Dong-chan
24	FW	KOR	Yoo Chang-hyun
25	DF	KOR	Choi Chul-soon
26	DF	KOR	Lee Jae-myung
28	MF	KOR	Choi Chi-won
29	DF	KOR	Lee Kyu-ro
30	DF	KOR	Kim Young-chan
31	GK	KOR	Kim Joon-ho
32	DF	KOR	Lee Ju-yong
34	MF	KOR	Jang Yoon-ho
35	DF	KOR	Ong Dong-kyun
36	DF	KOR	Ko Min-kook
37	DF	KOR	Lee Won-woo
39	FW	KOR	Cho Seok-jae
41	GK	KOR	Hwang Byeong-geun
44	DF	KOR	Kim Jae-hoan
47	MF	KOR	Moon Sang-yun

=== Out on loan ===
Note: Flags indicate national team as defined under FIFA eligibility rules; some limited exceptions apply. Players may hold more than one non-FIFA nationality.

No.	Pos.	Nation	Player
—	DF	KOR	Kwon Young-jin (to Gangneung FC)
—	MF	KOR	Seo Sang-min (to Sangju Sangmu for military service)
—	MF	KOR	Park Hee-do (to Ansan Police for military service)
—	MF	KOR	Shin Hyung-min (to Ansan Police for military service)
—	MF	KOR	Jeong Hyuk (to Ansan Police for military service)

No.	Pos.	Nation	Player
—	MF	KOR	Lee Seung-gi (to Sangju Sangmu for military service)
—	MF	KOR	Jeong Jong-hee (to Ulsan Hyundai Mipo)
—	FW	KOR	Song Je-heon (to Sangju Sangmu for military service)
—	FW	KOR	Kim Shin (to Olympique Lyonnais)

== Coaching staff ==
Position	Staff
Manager (interim)	(South Korea) Choi Kang-hee
GK Coach	(South Korea) Choi Eun-sung
Fitness Coach	(Brazil) Fabio Lefundes
Coach	(South Korea) Park Choong-kyun
Coach	(South Korea) Kim Sang-sik
Scouter	(South Korea) Cha Jong-Bok

Last updated: 29 February 2012
Source: Jeonbuk Hyundai Motors

== Match results ==
=== Training camp ===
- Training camp location: Dubai, United Arab Emirates

24 January 1	Jeonbuk (South Korea)	6 - 3	(United Arab Emirates) Emirates Club	Dubai, United Arab Emirates

27 January 2	Jeonbuk (South Korea)	4 - 0	(Russia) FC Rostov	Dubai, United Arab Emirates

28 January 3	Jeonbuk (South Korea)	1 - 0	(United Arab Emirates) Al Shabab	Dubai, United Arab Emirates
	Lee Dong-gook

29 January 4	Jeonbuk (South Korea)	1 - 0	(Russia) FC Krasnodar	Dubai, United Arab Emirates
	Eninho

30 January 5	Jeonbuk (South Korea)	4 - 1	(United Arab Emirates) Al-Ahli	Dubai, United Arab Emirates
	Edu; Choi Chul-soon; Eninho; Kwon Kyung-won		Goal

3 February 6	Jeonbuk (South Korea)	3 - 1	(Ukraine) FC Olimpik Donetsk	Dubai, United Arab Emirates
	Edu; Moon Sang-yoon		Goal

4 February 7	Jeonbuk (South Korea)	2 - 1	(Ukraine) FC Olimpik Donetsk	Dubai, United Arab Emirates
	Kim Hyung-il; Lee Sang-hyup		Goal

6 February 8	Jeonbuk (South Korea)	3 - 0	(Kazakhstan) FC Kairat	Dubai, United Arab Emirates

=== K-League Classic ===
All times are Korea Standard Time (KST) – UTC+9

Date Round	Home	Score	Away	Location

7 March 1	Jeonbuk	2-0	Seongnam	Jeonju, Jeonbuk
15:00	Edu (21 (pen.)), 83'	report		Stadium: Jeonju World Cup Stadium; Attendance: 23,810; Referee: Kim Jong-hyeok

14 March 2	FC Seoul	1-2	Jeonbuk	Seoul
14:00	Kim Hyun-sung 79'	report	Edu 63'; Eninho 70'	Stadium: Seoul World Cup Stadium; Attendance: 32,516; Referee: Kim Sang-woo

22 March 2015 3	Incheon United	0-0	Jeonbuk	Incheon
14:00	Kwon Wan-kyu (yellow card) 13' (yellow-red card); Oris (yellow card) 24'; Kim In-sung (yellow card) 39'; Kim Yong-hwan (yellow card) 81'	Summary	Cho Sung-hwan (yellow card) 6'; Ho Lee (yellow card) 30'; Eninho (yellow card) 66'	Stadium: Incheon Football Stadium; Attendance: 9,039; Referee: (South Korea) Lee Dong-Jun

4 April 2015 4	Jeonbuk	1-0	Pohang Steelers	Jeonju, Jeonbuk
13:00	Edu 72'	Summary	Bae Seul-ki (yellow card) 37'; André Moritz (yellow card) 90+3'	Stadium: Jeonju World Cup Stadium; Attendance: 16,638; Referee: (South Korea) Kim Jong-hyeok

12 April 2015 5	Gwangju FC	2-3	Jeonbuk	Gwangju
15:00	Cho Yong-tae 21'; Kim Young-bin (yellow card) 89'; Kim Kee-hee 90+1' (o.g.)	Summary	Han Kyo-won (yellow card) 5' (goal) 45'; Leonardo 41' 54'; Eninho (yellow card) 63'; Kwoun Sun-tae (yellow card) 85'	Stadium: Gwangju World Cup Stadium; Attendance: 3,064; Referee: (South Korea) Kim Dong-jin (referee)

15 April 2015 6	Busan IPark	1-2	Jeonbuk	Busan
20:00	Park Yong-ji 53'	Summary	Kim Kee-hee (yellow card) 15'; Lee Dong-gook 78' (yellow card) 88'; Leonardo 87'	Stadium: Busan Asiad Main Stadium; Attendance: 2,038; Referee: (South Korea) Ko Hyung-jin

18 April 2015 7	Jeonbuk	1-0	Jeju United	Jeonju, Jeonbuk
13:00	Choi Bo-kyung (yellow card) 28'; Leonardo 58'; Lee Sang-hyup (yellow card) 82'; Edu (yellow card) 90+2'	Summary	Jovanović (yellow card) 13'	Stadium: Jeonju World Cup Stadium; Attendance: 13,120; Referee: (South Korea) Lee Dong-Jun

26 April 2015 8	Jeonnam Dragons	2-1	Jeonbuk	Gwangyang
13:00	Lee Chang-min 21' 62'; Lee Ji-nam (yellow card) 28'; Lee Seul-chan (yellow card) 73'	Summary	Ho Lee (yellow card) 36'; Lee Jae-sung 41'; Cho Sung-hwan (yellow card) 45'; Lee Ju-yong (yellow card) 70'; Lee Sang-hyup (yellow card) 75'	Stadium: Gwangyang Football Stadium; Attendance: 6,772; Referee: (South Korea) Kim Sang-woo

==== Results by round ====
Round	1	2	3	4	5	6	7	8	9	10	11	12	13	14	15	16	17	18	19	20	21	22	23	24	25	26	27	28	29	30	31	32	33	34	35	36	37	38
Ground	H	A	A	H	A	A	H	A	H	A	H	H	A	A	H	H	A	H	H	A	H	A	H	H	A	H	H	A	A	H	H	A	A					
Result	W	W	D																																			
Position	1	2	3																																			

Updated to match(es) played on 27 February 2015. Source: League Fixtures and Results
A = Away; H = Home; W = Win; D = Draw; L = Loss

=== AFC Champions League ===
==== Group stage ====
Pos	Team	Pld	W	D	L	GF	GA	GD	Pts	Qualification	KSW	JHM	SLT	BBD
1	(Japan) Kashiwa Reysol	6	3	2	1	14	9	+5	11	Advance to knockout stage	—	3–2	2–1	5–1
2	(South Korea) Jeonbuk Hyundai Motors	6	3	2	1	14	6	+8	11	Advance to knockout stage	0–0	—	4–1	3–0
3	(China) Shandong Luneng Taishan	6	2	1	3	13	17	−4	7		4–4	1–4	—	3–1
4	(Vietnam) Becamex Bình Dương	6	1	1	4	6	15	−9	4		1–0	1–1	2–3	—

Source: AFC
Rules for classification: Group stage tiebreakers

24 February E1	Jeonbuk (South Korea)	0-0	(Japan) Kashiwa Reysol	Jeonju, Jeonbuk
19:00		report		Stadium: Jeonju World Cup Stadium; Attendance: 13,422; Referee: CHRISTOPHER BEATH (AUSTRALIA); MVP: Han Kyo-won

3 March E2	Shandong Luneng (China)	1-4	(South Korea) Jeonbuk	Jinan, China
15:30 (UTC+8)	Yang Xu 61'	report	Edu 21'; Han Kyo-won 71'; Lee Jae-sung 76'; Leonardo 90+3'	Stadium: Jinan Olympic Sports Center Stadium; Attendance: 27,386; Referee: MOHAMMED ABDULLA HASSAN (UNITED ARAB EMIRATES); MVP: Han Kyo-won
