= 2014 Kashiwa Reysol season =

Kashiwa Reysol
2014 season
- Manager: Nelsinho
- Stadium: Hitachi Kashiwa Stadium
- J1 League: 4th
- J.League Cup: Semifinals
- Emperor's Cup: Third round
- Suruga Bank Championship: Winners
Home colours	Away colours

2014 Kashiwa Reysol season.

== J1 League ==
=== League table ===
Pos	Team	Pld	W	D	L	GF	GA	GD	Pts	Qualification or relegation
2	Urawa Red Diamonds	34	18	8	8	52	32	+20	62	Qualification for 2015 AFC Champions League group stage (Note: Because Gamba Osaka also won the 2014 Emperor's Cup, the group stage spot has been given to third-placed Kashima Antlers, while ACL qualification spot was awarded to the fourth-placed Kashiwa Reysol.)
3	Kashima Antlers	34	18	6	10	64	39	+25	60	Qualification for 2015 AFC Champions League group stage
4	Kashiwa Reysol	34	17	9	8	48	40	+8	60	Qualification for 2015 AFC Champions League Third qualifying round
5	Sagan Tosu	34	19	3	12	41	33	+8	60	
6	Kawasaki Frontale	34	16	7	11	56	43	+13	55	

Updated to match(es) played on 8 December 2014. Source: J.League Data
Rules for classification: 1) points; 2) goal difference; 3) number of goals scored.

=== Match details ===
Match	Date	Team	Score	Team	Venue	Attendance
1	2014.03.01	Kashiwa Reysol	1–1	FC Tokyo	Hitachi Kashiwa Stadium	14,623
2	2014.03.08	Vissel Kobe	1–1	Kashiwa Reysol	Noevir Stadium Kobe	13,143
3	2014.03.15	Kashiwa Reysol	0–1	Nagoya Grampus	Hitachi Kashiwa Stadium	9,265
4	2014.03.23	Tokushima Vortis	0–2	Kashiwa Reysol	Pocarisweat Stadium	8,097
5	2014.03.29	Kashiwa Reysol	2–2	Omiya Ardija	Hitachi Kashiwa Stadium	11,568
6	2014.04.06	Kashiwa Reysol	2–1	Cerezo Osaka	Hitachi Kashiwa Stadium	13,731
7	2014.04.11	Kawasaki Frontale	1–1	Kashiwa Reysol	Kawasaki Todoroki Stadium	12,379
8	2014.04.19	Kashiwa Reysol	0–0	Yokohama F. Marinos	Hitachi Kashiwa Stadium	11,436
9	2014.04.26	Kashiwa Reysol	3–2	Urawa Reds	Hitachi Kashiwa Stadium	12,367
10	2014.04.29	Gamba Osaka	1–2	Kashiwa Reysol	Expo '70 Commemorative Stadium	13,845
11	2014.05.03	Kashiwa Reysol	1–0	Kashima Antlers	Hitachi Kashiwa Stadium	13,650
12	2014.05.06	Sagan Tosu	1–0	Kashiwa Reysol	Best Amenity Stadium	14,457
13	2014.05.10	Kashiwa Reysol	1–0	Albirex Niigata	Hitachi Kashiwa Stadium	11,003
14	2014.05.17	Ventforet Kofu	3–0	Kashiwa Reysol	Yamanashi Chuo Bank Stadium	10,073
15	2014.07.19	Kashiwa Reysol	0–0	Vegalta Sendai	Hitachi Kashiwa Stadium	8,982
16	2014.07.23	Sanfrecce Hiroshima	5–2	Kashiwa Reysol	Edion Stadium Hiroshima	12,673
17	2014.07.27	Shimizu S-Pulse	3–0	Kashiwa Reysol	IAI Stadium Nihondaira	11,095
18	2014.08.02	Kashiwa Reysol	4–1	Kawasaki Frontale	Hitachi Kashiwa Stadium	11,963
19	2014.08.09	Yokohama F. Marinos	2–2	Kashiwa Reysol	Nissan Stadium	24,544
20	2014.08.16	Kashiwa Reysol	2–0	Vissel Kobe	Hitachi Kashiwa Stadium	9,219
21	2014.08.23	Nagoya Grampus	1–1	Kashiwa Reysol	Toyota Stadium	15,124
22	2014.08.30	Kashiwa Reysol	3–0	Ventforet Kofu	Hitachi Kashiwa Stadium	9,022
23	2014.09.13	Cerezo Osaka	2–0	Kashiwa Reysol	Yanmar Stadium Nagai	22,941
24	2014.09.20	Urawa Reds	3–1	Kashiwa Reysol	Saitama Stadium 2002	31,652
25	2014.09.23	Kashiwa Reysol	2–0	Sagan Tosu	Hitachi Kashiwa Stadium	9,022
26	2014.09.27	FC Tokyo	4–0	Kashiwa Reysol	Ajinomoto Stadium	22,945
27	2014.10.05	Kashiwa Reysol	0–0	Sanfrecce Hiroshima	Hitachi Kashiwa Stadium	6,115
28	2014.10.18	Kashima Antlers	2–3	Kashiwa Reysol	Kashima Soccer Stadium	15,577
29	2014.10.22	Kashiwa Reysol	1–0	Gamba Osaka	Hitachi Kashiwa Stadium	7,474
30	2014.10.26	Vegalta Sendai	1–2	Kashiwa Reysol	Yurtec Stadium Sendai	15,184
31	2014.11.02	Kashiwa Reysol	2–0	Tokushima Vortis	Hitachi Kashiwa Stadium	9,251
32	2014.11.22	Omiya Ardija	1–2	Kashiwa Reysol	NACK5 Stadium Omiya	11,836
33	2014.11.29	Kashiwa Reysol	3–1	Shimizu S-Pulse	Hitachi Kashiwa Stadium	13,470
34	2014.12.08	Albirex Niigata	0–2	Kashiwa Reysol	Kashima Soccer Stadium	2,104

== J.League Cup ==
=== Group stage ===
Team	Pld	W	D	L	GF	GA	GD	Pts
Urawa Red Diamonds	6	5	0	1	15	9	+6	15
Kashiwa Reysol	6	3	2	1	11	5	+6	11
Ventforet Kofu	6	3	1	2	10	5	+5	10
Nagoya Grampus	6	3	1	2	10	10	0	10
Albirex Niigata	6	2	2	2	7	8	-1	8
Omiya Ardija	6	0	3	3	3	9	-6	3
Tokushima Vortis	6	0	1	5	8	18	-10	1

19 March 2014 1	Kashiwa Reysol	2–1	Urawa Red Diamonds	Kashiwa
19:04	Tanaka 43'; Watanabe 79'	Report	Umesaki 17'	Stadium: Hitachi Kashiwa Stadium; Attendance: 9,585; Referee: Takuto Okabe

2 April 2014 2	Ventforet Kofu	1–1	Kashiwa Reysol	Kōfu
19:03	Cristiano 84'	Report	Leandro 3'	Stadium: Yamanashi Chuo Bank Stadium; Attendance: 6,174; Referee: Yosuke Kubota

16 April 2014 3	Omiya Ardija	1–1	Kashiwa Reysol	Ōmiya-ku
19:02	K. Hashimoto 37'	Report	W. Hashimoto 55'	Stadium: NACK5 Stadium; Attendance: 5,082; Referee: Kenji Ogiya

21 May 2014 4	Kashiwa Reysol	3–0	Albirex Niigata	Kashiwa
19:04	Tanaka 9'; Barada 34'; Watanabe 58'	Report		Stadium: Hitachi Kashiwa Stadium; Attendance: 5,517; Referee: Koichiro Fukushima

5	Bye

28 May 2014 6	Nagoya Grampus	1–0	Kashiwa Reysol	Nagoya
19:04	Túlio 85'	Report		Stadium: Mizuho Park Athletics Stadium; Attendance: 5,941; Referee: Kenji Ogiya

1 June 2014 7	Kashiwa Reysol	4–1	Tokushima Vortis	Kashiwa
15:03	Tanaka 40'; Kudo 45', 54'; Leandro 67'	Report	Osaki 83'	Stadium: Hitachi Kashiwa Stadium; Attendance: 7,554; Referee: Kazuyoshi Enomoto

=== Knock-out stage ===
Quarterfinals

3 September 2014 1st leg	Yokohama F. Marinos	1–2	Kashiwa Reysol	Yokohama
19:30	Nakamachi 65'	Report	Leandro 63'; Kudo 74'	Stadium: NHK Spring Mitsuzawa Football Stadium; Attendance: 6,237; Referee: Jumpei Iida

7 September 2014 2nd leg	Kashiwa Reysol	3–1 (5–2 agg.)	Yokohama F. Marinos	Kashiwa
19:03	Kudo 31'; Leandro 64'; Eduardo 82'	Report	Nakazawa 23'	Stadium: Hitachi Kashiwa Stadium; Attendance: 8,087; Referee: Minoru Tōjō

Semifinals

9 October 2014 1st leg	Sanfrecce Hiroshima	2–0	Kashiwa Reysol	Hiroshima
19:03	Satō 41', 50'	Report		Stadium: Edion Stadium Hiroshima; Attendance: 5,516; Referee: Toshimitsu Yoshida

12 October 2014 2nd leg	Kashiwa Reysol	2–1 (2–3 agg.)	Sanfrecce Hiroshima	Kashiwa
16:00	Leandro 38', 51'	Report	Ishihara 74'	Stadium: Hitachi Kashiwa Stadium; Attendance: 9,010; Referee: Masaaki Iemoto

== Emperor's Cup ==
Kashiwa Reysol received a bye to the second round, as being part of the J.League Division 1.

12 July 2014 2nd round	Kashiwa Reysol	4–0	Fagiano Okayama Next	Kashiwa
16:00	Hashimoto 30'; Leandro 44'; Otani 79'; Oshima 90+3'	Report		Stadium: Hitachi Kashiwa Stadium; Attendance: 3,003; Referee: Junpei Iida

20 August 2014 3rd round	Kashiwa Reysol	1–1 (a.e.t.) (11–12 p)	JEF United Chiba	Kashiwa
19:03	Hashimoto 116'	Report	Onaiwu 108'	Stadium: Hitachi Kashiwa Stadium; Attendance: 6,077; Referee: Takuto Okabe

== Suruga Bank Championship ==
Kashiwa Reysol qualified for this tournament after winning the 2013 J.League Cup.

6 August 2014 Final	Kashiwa Reysol (Japan)	2–1	(Argentina) Lanús	Kashiwa, Japan
19:00 UTC+9	Takayama 43'; Leandro 88' (pen.) (yellow card) 90+4'	Report	Masushima 59' (o.g.); Araujo (yellow card) 82'; Braghieri (yellow card) 87'; González (red card) 90+3'	Stadium: Hitachi Kashiwa Stadium; Attendance: 10,140; Referee: Kim Jong-hyeok (South Korea)
