= 2015 AFC Champions League group stage =

Football tournament group stage

The 2015 AFC Champions League group stage was played from 24 February to 6 May 2015. A total of 32 teams competed in the group stage to decide the 16 places in the knockout stage of the 2015 AFC Champions League.

== Draw ==
The draw for the group stage was held on 11 December 2014, 16:00 UTC+8, at the Petaling Jaya Hilton Hotel in Kuala Lumpur, Malaysia. The 32 teams were drawn into eight groups of four. Teams from the same association could not be drawn into the same group.

The following 32 teams (16 from West Zone, 16 from East Zone) were entered into the group stage draw, which included the 24 automatic qualifiers and the eight qualifying play-off winners, whose identity was not known at the time of the draw:

Zone	Teams
West Zone (Groups A–D)	(Saudi Arabia) Al-Nassr; (Saudi Arabia) Al-Shabab; (Saudi Arabia) Al-Hilal; (Iran) Foolad; (Iran) Tractor Sazi; (Iran) Persepolis; (Uzbekistan) Pakhtakor; (Uzbekistan) Lokomotiv Tashkent; (Uzbekistan) Nasaf Qarshi; (United Arab Emirates) Al-Ahli; (United Arab Emirates) Al-Ain; (Qatar) Lekhwiya; (Saudi Arabia) Al-Ahli (Winner Play-off West 1); (Iran) Naft Tehran (Winner Play-off West 2); (Uzbekistan) Bunyodkor (Winner Play-off West 3); (Qatar) Al-Sadd (Winner Play-off West 4)
East Zone (Groups E–H)	(South Korea) Jeonbuk Hyundai Motors; (South Korea) Seongnam FC; (South Korea) Suwon Samsung Bluewings; (Japan) Gamba Osaka; (Japan) Urawa Red Diamonds; (Japan) Kashima Antlers; (Australia) Brisbane Roar; (Australia) Western Sydney Wanderers; (China) Guangzhou Evergrande; (China) Shandong Luneng Taishan; (Thailand) Buriram United; (Vietnam) Becamex Bình Dương; (South Korea) FC Seoul (Winner Play-off East 1); (Japan) Kashiwa Reysol (Winner Play-off East 2); (China) Guangzhou R&F (Winner Play-off East 3); (China) Beijing Guoan (Winner Play-off East 4)

== Format ==
In the group stage, each group was played on a home-and-away round-robin basis. The winners and runners-up of each group advanced to the round of 16.

=== Tiebreakers ===
The teams are ranked according to points (3 points for a win, 1 point for a draw, 0 points for a loss). If tied on points, tiebreakers are applied in the following order:

1. Greater number of points obtained in the group matches between the teams concerned;
2. Goal difference resulting from the group matches between the teams concerned;
3. Greater number of goals scored in the group matches between the teams concerned;
4. Greater number of away goals scored in the group matches between the teams concerned;
5. If, after applying criteria 1 to 4, teams still have an equal ranking, criteria 1 to 4 are reapplied exclusively to the matches between the teams in question to determine their final rankings. If this procedure does not lead to a decision, criteria 6 to 10 apply;
6. Goal difference in all the group matches;
7. Greater number of goals scored in all the group matches;
8. Penalty shoot-out if only two teams are involved and they are both on the field of play;
9. Fewer score calculated according to the number of yellow and red cards received in the group matches (1 point for a single yellow card, 3 points for a red card as a consequence of two yellow cards, 3 points for a direct red card, 4 points for a yellow card followed by a direct red card);
10. Team who belongs to the member association with the higher AFC ranking.

== Groups ==
The matchdays were 24–25 February, 3–4 March, 17–18 March, 7–8 April, 21–22 April, and 5–6 May 2015.

=== Group A ===
Pos	Team	Pld	W	D	L	GF	GA	GD	Pts	Qualification	LEK	PER	NSR	BYD
1	(Qatar) Lekhwiya	6	4	1	1	9	5	+4	13	Advance to knockout stage	—	3–0	1–1	1–0
2	(Iran) Persepolis	6	4	0	2	7	7	0	12	Advance to knockout stage	3–0	—	1–0	2–1
3	(Saudi Arabia) Al-Nassr	6	2	2	2	7	6	+1	8		1–3	3–0	—	1–1
4	(Uzbekistan) Bunyodkor	6	0	1	5	2	7	−5	1		0–1	0–1	0–1	—

Source: AFC
Rules for classification: Group stage tiebreakers
24 February 2015
18:30 UTC+3:30

Persepolis (Iran)	3–0	(Qatar) Lekhwiya
Bengar 60'; Norouzi 66'; Nouri 83' (pen.)	Report

Azadi Stadium, Tehran
Attendance: 15,350
Referee: Hettikamkanamge Perera (Sri Lanka)
24 February 2015
20:25 UTC+3

Al-Nassr (Saudi Arabia)	1–1	(Uzbekistan) Bunyodkor
Estoyanoff 51'	Report	Urinboev 14'

King Fahd International Stadium, Riyadh
Attendance: 23,664
Referee: Muhammad Taqi Aljaafari Bin Jahari (Singapore)

3 March 2015
18:00 UTC+5

Bunyodkor (Uzbekistan)	0–1	(Iran) Persepolis
	Report	Nouri 21' (pen.)

Bunyodkor Stadium, Tashkent
Attendance: 21,285
Referee: Kim Dong-jin (South Korea)
3 March 2015
18:15 UTC+3

Lekhwiya (Qatar)	1–1	(Saudi Arabia) Al-Nassr
Weiss 51'	Report	Musa 47' (o.g.)

Abdullah bin Khalifa Stadium, Doha
Attendance: 3,840
Referee: Mohanad Qasim Eesee Sarray (Iraq)

17 March 2015
18:00 UTC+5

Bunyodkor (Uzbekistan)	0–1	(Qatar) Lekhwiya
	Report	Nam Tae-hee 28' (pen.)

Bunyodkor Stadium, Tashkent
Attendance: 9,820
Referee: Jumpei Iida (Japan)
17 March 2015
20:30 UTC+3

Al-Nassr (Saudi Arabia)	3–0	(Iran) Persepolis
Mierzejewski 32'; Estoyanoff 86'; Al-Raheb 90+5'	Report

King Fahd International Stadium, Riyadh
Attendance: 20,315
Referee: Ryuji Sato (Japan)

8 April 2015
18:30 UTC+4:30

Persepolis (Iran)	1–0	(Saudi Arabia) Al-Nassr
Taremi 62' (pen.)	Report

Azadi Stadium, Tehran
Attendance: 100,000
Referee: Ma Ning (China)
8 April 2015
18:30 UTC+3

Lekhwiya (Qatar)	1–0	(Uzbekistan) Bunyodkor
Weiss 43'	Report

Abdullah bin Khalifa Stadium, Doha
Attendance: 3,188
Referee: Abdullah Al Hilali (Oman)

22 April 2015
19:00 UTC+5

Bunyodkor (Uzbekistan)	0–1	(Saudi Arabia) Al-Nassr
	Report	Mierzejewski 33'

Bunyodkor Stadium, Tashkent
Attendance: 3,153
Referee: Liu Kwok Man (Hong Kong)
22 April 2015
18:30 UTC+3

Lekhwiya (Qatar)	3–0	(Iran) Persepolis
Msakni 69'; Nam Tae-hee 83'; Afif 90+3'	Report

Abdullah bin Khalifa Stadium, Doha
Attendance: 4,877
Referee: Ben Williams (Australia)

6 May 2015
19:05 UTC+3

Al-Nassr (Saudi Arabia)	1–3	(Qatar) Lekhwiya
Al-Raheb 36'	Report	Msakni 28'; Nam Tae-hee 32'; Soria 58' (pen.)

King Fahd International Stadium, Riyadh
Attendance: 40,915
Referee: Kim Jong-hyeok (South Korea)
6 May 2015
20:35 UTC+4:30

Persepolis (Iran)	2–1	(Uzbekistan) Bunyodkor
Nouri 49' (pen.); Jurabaev 73' (o.g.)	Report	Rashidov 61'

Azadi Stadium, Tehran
Attendance: 100,000
Referee: Yudai Yamamoto (Japan)

=== Group B ===
Pos	Team	Pld	W	D	L	GF	GA	GD	Pts	Qualification	AIN	NAF	PAK	SHB
1	(United Arab Emirates) Al-Ain	6	3	3	0	7	2	+5	12	Advance to knockout stage	—	3–0	1–1	0–0
2	(Iran) Naft Tehran	6	2	2	2	8	8	0	8	Advance to knockout stage	1–1	—	1–1	2–1
3	(Uzbekistan) Pakhtakor	6	1	3	2	6	8	−2	6		0–1	2–1	—	0–2
4	(Saudi Arabia) Al-Shabab	6	1	2	3	5	8	−3	5		0–1	0–3	2–2	—

Source: AFC
Rules for classification: Group stage tiebreakers
24 February 2015
16:30 UTC+5

Pakhtakor (Uzbekistan)	2–1	(Iran) Naft Tehran
Makharadze 48'; Sergeev 85'	Report	Ghorbani 59'

Pakhtakor Markaziy Stadium, Tashkent
Attendance: 4,913
Referee: Masaaki Toma (Japan)
24 February 2015
19:00 UTC+4

Al-Ain (United Arab Emirates)	0–0	(Saudi Arabia) Al-Shabab
	Report

Hazza Bin Zayed Stadium, Al Ain
Attendance: 15,426
Referee: Mohd Amirul Izwan Bin Yaacob (Malaysia)

3 March 2015
18:00 UTC+3:30

Naft Tehran (Iran)	1–1	(United Arab Emirates) Al-Ain
Kouroshi 50'	Report	Gyan 58' (pen.)

Azadi Stadium, Tehran
Attendance: 3,300
Referee: Tan Hai (China)
3 March 2015
20:20 UTC+3

Al-Shabab (Saudi Arabia)	2–2	(Uzbekistan) Pakhtakor
Al-Khaibari 35'; Hazazi 84'	Report	Sergeev 62'; Makharadze 71' (pen.)

Prince Faisal bin Fahd Stadium, Riyadh
Attendance: 5,404
Referee: Peter Green (Australia)

18 March 2015
17:00 UTC+5

Pakhtakor (Uzbekistan)	0–1	(United Arab Emirates) Al-Ain
	Report	Stoch 61'

Pakhtakor Markaziy Stadium, Tashkent
Attendance: 8,675
Referee: Kim Jong-hyeok (South Korea)
18 March 2015
18:00 UTC+3:30

Naft Tehran (Iran)	2–1	(Saudi Arabia) Al-Shabab
Motahari 86'; Padovani 90'	Report	Hazazi 43' (pen.)

Azadi Stadium, Tehran
Attendance: 1,560
Referee: Kim Dong-jin (South Korea)

7 April 2015
19:15 UTC+4

Al-Ain (United Arab Emirates)	1–1	(Uzbekistan) Pakhtakor
Kembo 20'	Report	Sergeev 45+2'

Hazza Bin Zayed Stadium, Al Ain
Attendance: 6,872
Referee: Fahad Al-Marri (Qatar)
7 April 2015
20:35 UTC+3

Al-Shabab (Saudi Arabia)	0–3	(Iran) Naft Tehran
	Report	Amiri 57'; Motahari 83'; Aliyari 90+1'

Prince Faisal bin Fahd Stadium, Riyadh
Attendance: 5,035
Referee: Hettikamkanamge Perera (Sri Lanka)

22 April 2015
19:00 UTC+4:30

Naft Tehran (Iran)	1–1	(Uzbekistan) Pakhtakor
Rezaei 25'	Report	Kozak 36'

Azadi Stadium, Tehran
Attendance: 1,840
Referee: Kim Sang-woo (South Korea)
22 April 2015
20:40 UTC+3

Al-Shabab (Saudi Arabia)	0–1	(United Arab Emirates) Al-Ain
	Report	Gyan 58'

Prince Faisal bin Fahd Stadium, Riyadh
Attendance: 1,977
Referee: Minoru Tōjō (Japan)

6 May 2015
20:30 UTC+5

Pakhtakor (Uzbekistan)	0–2	(Saudi Arabia) Al-Shabab
	Report	Al-Shameri 6'; Al Asta 65' (pen.)

Pakhtakor Markaziy Stadium, Tashkent
Attendance: 3,638
Referee: Mohd Amirul Izwan Bin Yaacob (Malaysia)
6 May 2015
19:30 UTC+4

Al-Ain (United Arab Emirates)	3–0	(Iran) Naft Tehran
Abdulrahman 63'; Gyan 74'; Kembo 87'	Report

Hazza Bin Zayed Stadium, Al Ain
Attendance: 4,299
Referee: Peter Green (Australia)

=== Group C ===
Pos	Team	Pld	W	D	L	GF	GA	GD	Pts	Qualification	HIL	SAD	FOO	LOK
1	(Saudi Arabia) Al-Hilal	6	4	1	1	9	4	+5	13	Advance to knockout stage	—	2–1	2–0	3–1
2	(Qatar) Al-Sadd	6	3	1	2	9	9	0	10	Advance to knockout stage	1–0	—	1–0	6–2
3	(Iran) Foolad	6	1	3	2	2	4	−2	6		0–0	0–0	—	1–0
4	(Uzbekistan) Lokomotiv Tashkent	6	1	1	4	10	13	−3	4		1–2	5–0	1–1	—

Source: AFC
Rules for classification: Group stage tiebreakers
25 February 2015
16:00 UTC+3:30

Foolad (Iran)	0–0	(Qatar) Al-Sadd
	Report

Ghadir Stadium, Ahvaz
Attendance: 37,843
Referee: Kim Sang-woo (South Korea)
25 February 2015
20:30 UTC+3

Al-Hilal (Saudi Arabia)	3–1	(Uzbekistan) Lokomotiv Tashkent
Kariri 11'; Al-Salem 14'; Neves 71'	Report	Mirzayev 39'

King Fahd International Stadium, Riyadh
Attendance: 17,440
Referee: Kim Jong-hyeok (South Korea)

4 March 2015
15:00 UTC+5

Lokomotiv Tashkent (Uzbekistan)	1–1	(Iran) Foolad
Zoteev 6'	Report	Jama'ati 32'

Lokomotiv Stadium, Tashkent
Attendance: 7,456
Referee: Ryuji Sato (Japan)
4 March 2015
18:45 UTC+3

Al-Sadd (Qatar)	1–0	(Saudi Arabia) Al-Hilal
Ibrahim 29'	Report

Jassim Bin Hamad Stadium, Al Rayyan
Attendance: 6,843
Referee: Ahmed Al-Kaf (Oman)

17 March 2015
16:00 UTC+3:30

Foolad (Iran)	0–0	(Saudi Arabia) Al-Hilal
	Report

Ghadir Stadium, Ahvaz
Attendance: 37,452
Referee: Jarred Gillett (Australia)
17 March 2015
18:45 UTC+3

Al-Sadd (Qatar)	6–2	(Uzbekistan) Lokomotiv Tashkent
Ibrahim 27' (pen.), 50'; Al-Haydos 34'; Belhadj 40'; Hassan 63'; Grafite 66'	Report	Kojašević 56'; J. J. Hasanov 77' (pen.)

Jassim Bin Hamad Stadium, Al Rayyan
Attendance: 4,100
Referee: Ben Williams (Australia)

8 April 2015
16:00 UTC+5

Lokomotiv Tashkent (Uzbekistan)	5–0	(Qatar) Al-Sadd
Bikmaev 7', 14'; Shoakhmedov 55'; Kojašević 79'; Koryan 90+1'	Report

Lokomotiv Stadium, Tashkent
Attendance: 3,852
Referee: Kim Dong-jin (South Korea)
8 April 2015
20:45 UTC+3

Al-Hilal (Saudi Arabia)	2–0	(Iran) Foolad
Al-Shamrani 46'; Al-Shahrani 61'	Report

King Fahd International Stadium, Riyadh
Attendance: 20,087
Referee: Masaaki Toma (Japan)

21 April 2015
16:00 UTC+5

Lokomotiv Tashkent (Uzbekistan)	1–2	(Saudi Arabia) Al-Hilal
Abdukholiqov 90+4'	Report	Al Abed 56'; Al-Zori 72'

Lokomotiv Stadium, Tashkent
Attendance: 3,974
Referee: Nagor Amir Noor Mohamed (Malaysia)
21 April 2015
19:00 UTC+3

Al-Sadd (Qatar)	1–0	(Iran) Foolad
Muriqui 42'	Report

Jassim Bin Hamad Stadium, Al Rayyan
Attendance: 3,455
Referee: Mohd Amirul Izwan Bin Yaacob (Malaysia)

5 May 2015
20:35 UTC+4:30

Foolad (Iran)	1–0	(Uzbekistan) Lokomotiv Tashkent
Jahantigh 89'	Report

Ghadir Stadium, Ahvaz
Attendance: 2,142
Referee: Ma Ning (China)
5 May 2015
19:05 UTC+3

Al-Hilal (Saudi Arabia)	2–1	(Qatar) Al-Sadd
Al-Salem 20'; Kasola 69' (o.g.)	Report	Al-Haydos 32' (pen.)

King Fahd International Stadium, Riyadh
Attendance: 9,394
Referee: Ko Hyung-jin (South Korea)

=== Group D ===
Pos	Team	Pld	W	D	L	GF	GA	GD	Pts	Qualification	AHS	AHU	NSF	TRA
1	(Saudi Arabia) Al-Ahli	6	3	3	0	11	7	+4	12	Advance to knockout stage	—	2–1	2–1	2–0
2	(United Arab Emirates) Al-Ahli	6	2	2	2	8	8	0	8	Advance to knockout stage	3–3	—	0–0	3–2
3	(Uzbekistan) Nasaf Qarshi	6	2	2	2	5	5	0	8		0–0	0–1	—	2–1
4	(Iran) Tractor Sazi	6	1	1	4	7	11	−4	4		2–2	1–0	1–2	—

Source: AFC
Rules for classification: Group stage tiebreakers
25 February 2015
18:00 UTC+5

Nasaf Qarshi (Uzbekistan)	2–1	(Iran) Tractor Sazi
Shomurodov 46'; Karimov 52'	Report	Edinho 32'

Qarshi Markaziy Stadium, Qarshi
Attendance: 11,160
Referee: Abdullah Al Hilali (Oman)
25 February 2015
20:25 UTC+4

Al-Ahli (United Arab Emirates)	3–3	(Saudi Arabia) Al-Ahli
Al Hammadi 19', 79'; Khalil 43'	Report	Osvaldo 2'; Al-Mogahwi 41'; Al-Jassim 57'

Al-Rashid Stadium, Dubai
Attendance: 7,200
Referee: Minoru Tōjō (Japan)

4 March 2015
16:00 UTC+3:30

Tractor Sazi (Iran)	1–0	(United Arab Emirates) Al-Ahli
Ahmadzadeh 40'	Report

Sahand Stadium, Tabriz
Attendance: 25,830
Referee: Ko Hyung-jin (South Korea)
4 March 2015
20:15 UTC+3

Al-Ahli (Saudi Arabia)	2–1	(Uzbekistan) Nasaf Qarshi
Al Soma 22'; Al-Amari 78'	Report	Geworkýan 65'

King Abdullah Sports City, Jeddah
Attendance: 19,855
Referee: Strebre Delovski (Australia)

18 March 2015
20:35 UTC+4

Al-Ahli (United Arab Emirates)	0–0	(Uzbekistan) Nasaf Qarshi
	Report

Al-Rashid Stadium, Dubai
Attendance: 3,121
Referee: Mohanad Qasim Eesee Sarray (Iraq)
18 March 2015
20:20 UTC+3

Al-Ahli (Saudi Arabia)	2–0	(Iran) Tractor Sazi
Al-Jassim 71', 79'	Report

King Abdullah Sports City, Jeddah
Attendance: 45,482
Referee: Ahmed Al-Kaf (Oman)

7 April 2015
16:00 UTC+4:30

Tractor Sazi (Iran)	2–2	(Saudi Arabia) Al-Ahli
Edinho 60'; Saghebi 77'	Report	Al Soma 74', 90'

Sahand Stadium, Tabriz
Attendance: 32,500
Referee: Ryuji Sato (Japan)
7 April 2015
19:00 UTC+5

Nasaf Qarshi (Uzbekistan)	0–1	(United Arab Emirates) Al-Ahli
	Report	Ribeiro 81'

Qarshi Markaziy Stadium, Qarshi
Attendance: 15,500
Referee: Kim Jong-hyeok (South Korea)

21 April 2015
18:00 UTC+4:30

Tractor Sazi (Iran)	1–2	(Uzbekistan) Nasaf Qarshi
Kiani 52'	Report	Geworkýan 59', 71'

Sahand Stadium, Tabriz
Attendance: 15,000
Referee: Muhammad Taqi Aljaafari Bin Jahari (Singapore)
21 April 2015
20:30 UTC+3

Al-Ahli (Saudi Arabia)	2–1	(United Arab Emirates) Al-Ahli
Abu Radeah 78'; Bruno César 90+4'	Report	Ribeiro 16'

King Abdullah Sports City, Jeddah
Attendance: 15,842
Referee: Abdullah Balideh (Qatar)

5 May 2015
19:30 UTC+4

Al-Ahli (United Arab Emirates)	3–2	(Iran) Tractor Sazi
Ribeiro 58'; Khalil 77', 88'	Report	Bayrami 21'; Nariman Jahan 67'

Al-Rashid Stadium, Dubai
Attendance: 3,540
Referee: Kim Dong-jin (South Korea)
5 May 2015
20:30 UTC+5

Nasaf Qarshi (Uzbekistan)	0–0	(Saudi Arabia) Al-Ahli
	Report

Qarshi Markaziy Stadium, Qarshi
Attendance: 16,000
Referee: Masaaki Toma (Japan)

=== Group E ===
Pos	Team	Pld	W	D	L	GF	GA	GD	Pts	Qualification	KSW	JHM	SLT	BBD
1	(Japan) Kashiwa Reysol	6	3	2	1	14	9	+5	11	Advance to knockout stage	—	3–2	2–1	5–1
2	(South Korea) Jeonbuk Hyundai Motors	6	3	2	1	14	6	+8	11	Advance to knockout stage	0–0	—	4–1	3–0
3	(China) Shandong Luneng Taishan	6	2	1	3	13	17	−4	7		4–4	1–4	—	3–1
4	(Vietnam) Becamex Bình Dương	6	1	1	4	6	15	−9	4		1–0	1–1	2–3	—

Source: AFC
Rules for classification: Group stage tiebreakers
24 February 2015
19:00 UTC+9

Jeonbuk Hyundai Motors (South Korea)	0–0	(Japan) Kashiwa Reysol
	Report

Jeonju World Cup Stadium, Jeonju
Attendance: 13,422
Referee: Chris Beath (Australia)
24 February 2015
18:00 UTC+7

Becamex Bình Dương (Vietnam)	2–3	(China) Shandong Luneng Taishan
Oseni 48'; Wang Qiang 56' (o.g.)	Report	Wang Yongpo 47'; Yang Xu 61', 81'

Gò Đậu Stadium, Thủ Dầu Một
Attendance: 8,913
Referee: Ben Williams (Australia)

3 March 2015
15:30 UTC+8

Shandong Luneng Taishan (China)	1–4	(South Korea) Jeonbuk Hyundai Motors
Yang Xu 61'	Report	Edu 21'; Han Kyo-won 71'; Lee Jae-sung 76'; Leonardo 90+3'

Jinan Olympic Sports Center Stadium, Jinan
Attendance: 27,386
Referee: Mohammed Abdulla Hassan Mohamed (United Arab Emirates)
3 March 2015
19:00 UTC+9

Kashiwa Reysol (Japan)	5–1	(Vietnam) Becamex Bình Dương
Kudo 42', 67'; Vranković 44' (o.g.); Kim Chang-soo 56'; Otani 75'	Report	Oseni 82'

Hitachi Kashiwa Soccer Stadium, Kashiwa
Attendance: 5,694
Referee: Fahad Al-Marri (Qatar)

17 March 2015
19:00 UTC+9

Kashiwa Reysol (Japan)	2–1	(China) Shandong Luneng Taishan
Taketomi 23'; Wako 90+2'	Report	Montillo 51'

Hitachi Kashiwa Soccer Stadium, Kashiwa
Attendance: 7,657
Referee: Ravshan Irmatov (Uzbekistan)
17 March 2015
19:00 UTC+9

Jeonbuk Hyundai Motors (South Korea)	3–0	(Vietnam) Becamex Bình Dương
Eninho 16'; Lee Dong-gook 41', 88'	Report

Jeonju World Cup Stadium, Jeonju
Attendance: 6,704
Referee: Abdullah Balideh (Qatar)

8 April 2015
19:00 UTC+8

Shandong Luneng Taishan (China)	4–4	(Japan) Kashiwa Reysol
Wang Yongpo 4'; Júnior Urso 34'; Montillo 37'; Yang Xu 49' (pen.)	Report	Leandro 23'; Kudo 29'; Cristiano 32', 76'

Jinan Olympic Sports Center Stadium, Jinan
Attendance: 21,631
Referee: Alireza Faghani (Iran)
8 April 2015
18:00 UTC+7

Becamex Bình Dương (Vietnam)	1–1	(South Korea) Jeonbuk Hyundai Motors
Dieng 90+3'	Report	Eninho 31'

Gò Đậu Stadium, Thủ Dầu Một
Attendance: 4,000
Referee: Jarred Gillett (Australia)

22 April 2015
19:00 UTC+9

Kashiwa Reysol (Japan)	3–2	(South Korea) Jeonbuk Hyundai Motors
Eduardo 9'; Taketomi 20', 39'	Report	Lee Dong-gook 67', 81'

Hitachi Kashiwa Soccer Stadium, Kashiwa
Attendance: 7,424
Referee: Nawaf Shukralla (Bahrain)
22 April 2015
19:00 UTC+8

Shandong Luneng Taishan (China)	3–1	(Vietnam) Becamex Bình Dương
Yang Xu 27', 70'; Júnior Urso 61'	Report	Nguyễn Trọng Hoàng 19'

Jinan Olympic Sports Center Stadium, Jinan
Attendance: 12,566
Referee: Ammar Al-Jeneibi (United Arab Emirates)

6 May 2015
19:30 UTC+9

Jeonbuk Hyundai Motors (South Korea)	4–1	(China) Shandong Luneng Taishan
Lee Jae-sung 25'; Kim Hyung-il 51'; Eninho 80' (pen.); Edu 88'	Report	Wang Tong 45+1'

Jeonju World Cup Stadium, Jeonju
Attendance: 11,131
Referee: Hettikamkanamge Perera (Sri Lanka)
6 May 2015
17:30 UTC+7

Becamex Bình Dương (Vietnam)	1–0	(Japan) Kashiwa Reysol
Lê Công Vinh 56'	Report

Gò Đậu Stadium, Thủ Dầu Một
Attendance: 4,600
Referee: Fahad Al-Mirdasi (Saudi Arabia)

=== Group F ===
Pos	Team	Pld	W	D	L	GF	GA	GD	Pts	Qualification	GAM	SNM	BUR	GRF
1	(Japan) Gamba Osaka	6	3	1	2	10	7	+3	10	Advance to knockout stage	—	2–1	1–1	0–2
2	(South Korea) Seongnam FC	6	3	1	2	7	5	+2	10	Advance to knockout stage	2–0	—	2–1	0–0
3	(Thailand) Buriram United	6	3	1	2	12	7	+5	10		1–2	2–1	—	5–0
4	(China) Guangzhou R&F	6	1	1	4	3	13	−10	4		0–5	0–1	1–2	—

Source: AFC
Rules for classification: Group stage tiebreakers
24 February 2015
19:00 UTC+9

Gamba Osaka (Japan)	0–2	(China) Guangzhou R&F
	Report	Hamdallah 10'; Wang Song 80'

Osaka Expo '70 Stadium, Suita
Attendance: 8,848
Referee: Mohsen Torky (Iran)
24 February 2015
18:00 UTC+7

Buriram United (Thailand)	2–1	(South Korea) Seongnam FC
Prakit 16'; Macena 18'	Report	Narubadin 87' (o.g.)

New I-Mobile Stadium, Buriram
Attendance: 8,959
Referee: Mohammed Abdulla Hassan Mohamed (United Arab Emirates)

3 March 2015
19:30 UTC+9

Seongnam FC (South Korea)	2–0	(Japan) Gamba Osaka
Bueno 8' (pen.); Hwang Ui-jo 67'	Report

Tancheon Sports Complex, Seongnam
Attendance: 7,813
Referee: Ravshan Irmatov (Uzbekistan)
3 March 2015
19:30 UTC+8

Guangzhou R&F (China)	1–2	(Thailand) Buriram United
Lu Lin 27'	Report	Go Seul-ki 44'; Macena 90'

Yuexiushan Stadium, Guangzhou
Attendance: 9,308
Referee: Mohd Amirul Izwan Bin Yaacob (Malaysia)

17 March 2015
19:30 UTC+8

Guangzhou R&F (China)	0–1	(South Korea) Seongnam FC
	Report	Hwang Ui-jo 27'

Yuexiushan Stadium, Guangzhou
Attendance: 8,638
Referee: Fahad Al-Marri (Qatar)
18 March 2015
19:00 UTC+9

Gamba Osaka (Japan)	1–1	(Thailand) Buriram United
Abe 39'	Report	Theeraton 62'

Osaka Expo '70 Stadium, Suita
Attendance: 6,469
Referee: Alireza Faghani (Iran)

7 April 2015
19:30 UTC+9

Seongnam FC (South Korea)	0–0	(China) Guangzhou R&F
	Report

Tancheon Sports Complex, Seongnam
Attendance: 5,777
Referee: Nawaf Shukralla (Bahrain)
7 April 2015
18:00 UTC+7

Buriram United (Thailand)	1–2	(Japan) Gamba Osaka
Theeraton 9'	Report	Lins 41'; Omori 87'

New I-Mobile Stadium, Buriram
Attendance: 23,987
Referee: Ahmed Al-Kaf (Oman)

22 April 2015
19:30 UTC+9

Seongnam FC (South Korea)	2–1	(Thailand) Buriram United
Kim Do-heon 27' (pen.); Nam Joon-jae 38'	Report	Diogo 77'

Tancheon Sports Complex, Seongnam
Attendance: 3,762
Referee: Fahad Al-Mirdasi (Saudi Arabia)
22 April 2015
19:30 UTC+8

Guangzhou R&F (China)	0–5	(Japan) Gamba Osaka
	Report	Patric 14', 45'; Abe 44', 68'; Usami 70'

Yuexiushan Stadium, Guangzhou
Attendance: 8,647
Referee: Adham Makhadmeh (Jordan)

6 May 2015
19:15 UTC+9

Gamba Osaka (Japan)	2–1	(South Korea) Seongnam FC
Usami 64'; Lins 82'	Report	Hwang Ui-jo 15'

Osaka Expo '70 Stadium, Suita
Attendance: 12,821
Referee: Mohammed Abdulla Hassan Mohamed (United Arab Emirates)
6 May 2015
17:15 UTC+7

Buriram United (Thailand)	5–0	(China) Guangzhou R&F
Diogo 12', 38', 56'; Túñez 36'; Macena 59'	Report

New I-Mobile Stadium, Buriram
Attendance: 17,331
Referee: Ammar Al-Jeneibi (United Arab Emirates)

=== Group G ===
Pos	Team	Pld	W	D	L	GF	GA	GD	Pts	Qualification	BJG	SSB	BRI	URA
1	(China) Beijing Guoan	6	3	2	1	6	3	+3	11	Advance to knockout stage	—	1–0	0–1	2–0
2	(South Korea) Suwon Samsung Bluewings	6	3	2	1	11	8	+3	11	Advance to knockout stage	1–1	—	3–1	2–1
3	(Australia) Brisbane Roar	6	2	1	3	7	9	−2	7		0–1	3–3	—	1–2
4	(Japan) Urawa Red Diamonds	6	1	1	4	5	9	−4	4		1–1	1–2	0–1	—

Source: AFC
Rules for classification: Group stage tiebreakers
25 February 2015
19:30 UTC+10

Brisbane Roar (Australia)	0–1	(China) Beijing Guoan
	Report	Shao Jiayi 90+3'

Robina Stadium, Gold Coast
Attendance: 6,851
Referee: Ahmed Al-Kaf (Oman)
25 February 2015
19:30 UTC+9

Suwon Samsung Bluewings (South Korea)	2–1	(Japan) Urawa Red Diamonds
Oh Beom-seok 56'; Léo 87'	Report	Moriwaki 45+1'

Suwon World Cup Stadium, Suwon
Attendance: 13,846
Referee: Ammar Al-Jeneibi (United Arab Emirates)

4 March 2015
19:30 UTC+9

Urawa Red Diamonds (Japan)	0–1	(Australia) Brisbane Roar
	Report	Borrello 3'

Saitama Stadium 2002, Saitama
Attendance: 13,527
Referee: Ilgiz Tantashev (Uzbekistan)
4 March 2015
19:30 UTC+8

Beijing Guoan (China)	1–0	(South Korea) Suwon Samsung Bluewings
Damjanović 65'	Report

Workers Stadium, Beijing
Attendance: 35,567
Referee: Hettikamkanamge Perera (Sri Lanka)

17 March 2015
19:30 UTC+8

Beijing Guoan (China)	2–0	(Japan) Urawa Red Diamonds
Batalla 78'; Yu Dabao 84'	Report

Workers Stadium, Beijing
Attendance: 38,355
Referee: Mohammed Abdulla Hassan Mohamed (United Arab Emirates)
18 March 2015
19:30 UTC+10

Brisbane Roar (Australia)	3–3	(South Korea) Suwon Samsung Bluewings
Borrello 13'; Clut 22', 80'	Report	Seo Jung-jin 39', 50'; Jong Tae-se 71'

Robina Stadium, Gold Coast
Attendance: 5,197
Referee: Fahad Al-Mirdasi (Saudi Arabia)

8 April 2015
19:30 UTC+9

Urawa Red Diamonds (Japan)	1–1	(China) Beijing Guoan
Makino 74'	Report	Yu Dabao 33'

Saitama Stadium 2002, Saitama
Attendance: 13,683
Referee: Abdullah Balideh (Qatar)
8 April 2015
19:30 UTC+9

Suwon Samsung Bluewings (South Korea)	3–1	(Australia) Brisbane Roar
Kwon Chang-hoon 51'; Seo Jung-jin 59'; Yeom Ki-hun 65'	Report	DeVere 76'

Suwon World Cup Stadium, Suwon
Attendance: 6,771
Referee: Abdulrahman Al-Jassim (Qatar)

21 April 2015
19:30 UTC+9

Urawa Red Diamonds (Japan)	1–2	(South Korea) Suwon Samsung Bluewings
Ljubijankić 69'	Report	Ko Cha-won 74'; Kaio 89'

Saitama Stadium 2002, Saitama
Attendance: 13,924
Referee: Ahmed Al-Kaf (Oman)
21 April 2015
19:30 UTC+8

Beijing Guoan (China)	0–1	(Australia) Brisbane Roar
	Report	Kaluđerović 39'

Workers Stadium, Beijing
Attendance: 35,578
Referee: Valentin Kovalenko (Uzbekistan)

5 May 2015
19:00 UTC+10

Brisbane Roar (Australia)	1–2	(Japan) Urawa Red Diamonds
Kaluđerović 70'	Report	Koroki 24'; Muto 57'

Robina Stadium, Gold Coast
Attendance: 5,941
Referee: Alireza Faghani (Iran)
5 May 2015
18:00 UTC+9

Suwon Samsung Bluewings (South Korea)	1–1	(China) Beijing Guoan
Léo 27'	Report	Damjanović 25'

Suwon World Cup Stadium, Suwon
Attendance: 14,380
Referee: Ravshan Irmatov (Uzbekistan)

=== Group H ===
Pos	Team	Pld	W	D	L	GF	GA	GD	Pts	Qualification	GET	SEO	WSW	KSM
1	(China) Guangzhou Evergrande	6	3	1	2	9	9	0	10	Advance to knockout stage	—	1–0	0–2	4–3
2	(South Korea) FC Seoul	6	2	3	1	5	4	+1	9	Advance to knockout stage	0–0	—	0–0	1–0
3	(Australia) Western Sydney Wanderers	6	2	2	2	9	7	+2	8		2–3	1–1	—	1–2
4	(Japan) Kashima Antlers	6	2	0	4	10	13	−3	6		2–1	2–3	1–3	—

Source: AFC
Rules for classification: Group stage tiebreakers
25 February 2015
19:00 UTC+9

Kashima Antlers (Japan)	1–3	(Australia) Western Sydney Wanderers
Doi 68'	Report	Shoji 54' (o.g.); Takahagi 86'; Bridge 90+3'

Kashima Soccer Stadium, Kashima
Attendance: 7,736
Referee: Fahad Al-Mirdasi (Saudi Arabia)
25 February 2015
20:00 UTC+8

Guangzhou Evergrande (China)	1–0	(South Korea) FC Seoul
Goulart 31'	Report

Tianhe Stadium, Guangzhou
Attendance: 46,749
Referee: Mohanad Qasim Eesee Sarray (Iraq)

4 March 2015
19:30 UTC+11

Western Sydney Wanderers (Australia)	2–3	(China) Guangzhou Evergrande
La Rocca 57'; Castelen 90+5'	Report	Goulart 19', 58', 64'

Parramatta Stadium, Sydney
Attendance: 11,418
Referee: Nagor Amir Noor Mohamed (Malaysia)
4 March 2015
19:30 UTC+9

FC Seoul (South Korea)	1–0	(Japan) Kashima Antlers
Kim Jin-kyu 66'	Report

Seoul World Cup Stadium, Seoul
Attendance: 5,790
Referee: Alireza Faghani (Iran)

18 March 2015
19:30 UTC+9

FC Seoul (South Korea)	0–0	(Australia) Western Sydney Wanderers
	Report

Seoul World Cup Stadium, Seoul
Attendance: 5,645
Referee: Ammar Al-Jeneibi (United Arab Emirates)
18 March 2015
20:00 UTC+8

Guangzhou Evergrande (China)	4–3	(Japan) Kashima Antlers
Goulart 10', 62'; Elkeson 57'; Zhao Xuri 90+2'	Report	Takasaki 36'; Doi 51'; Shibasaki 90+3'

Tianhe Stadium, Guangzhou
Attendance: 48,651
Referee: Mohd Amirul Izwan Bin Yaacob (Malaysia)

7 April 2015
19:30 UTC+10

Western Sydney Wanderers (Australia)	1–1	(South Korea) FC Seoul
Bulut 12'	Report	Go Yo-han 72'

Parramatta Stadium, Sydney
Attendance: 7,073
Referee: Valentin Kovalenko (Uzbekistan)
7 April 2015
19:00 UTC+9

Kashima Antlers (Japan)	2–1	(China) Guangzhou Evergrande
Endo 19' (pen.); Takasaki 90+3'	Report	Elkeson 75'

Kashima Soccer Stadium, Kashima
Attendance: 7,033
Referee: Ammar Al-Jeneibi (United Arab Emirates)

21 April 2015
19:30 UTC+10

Western Sydney Wanderers (Australia)	1–2	(Japan) Kashima Antlers
Rukavytsya 24'	Report	Doi 66'; Kanazaki 90+1'

Parramatta Stadium, Sydney
Attendance: 5,221
Referee: Khamis Al-Marri (Qatar)
21 April 2015
19:30 UTC+9

FC Seoul (South Korea)	0–0	(China) Guangzhou Evergrande
	Report

Seoul World Cup Stadium, Seoul
Attendance: 17,157
Referee: Abdulrahman Al-Jassim (Qatar)

5 May 2015
19:00 UTC+8

Guangzhou Evergrande (China)	0–2	(Australia) Western Sydney Wanderers
	Report	Bridge 33'; Juric 90+3'

Tianhe Stadium, Guangzhou
Attendance: 35,641
Referee: Nawaf Shukralla (Bahrain)
5 May 2015
20:00 UTC+9

Kashima Antlers (Japan)	2–3	(South Korea) FC Seoul
Akasaki 8'; Shibasaki 79'	Report	Lee Woong-hee 36'; Osmar 51'; Molina 90+1'

Kashima Soccer Stadium, Kashima
Attendance: 19,233
Referee: Abdullah Al Hilali (Oman)
