= 2015 AFC Champions League final =

- Event: 2015 AFC Champions League
Al-Ahli	Guangzhou Evergrande
(United Arab Emirates)	(China)
0	1
- on aggregate

First leg
Al-Ahli	Guangzhou Evergrande
0	0
- Date: 7 November 2015
- Venue: Al-Rashid Stadium, Dubai
- AFC Man of the Match: Zheng Zhi (Guangzhou Evergrande)
- Referee: Kim Jong-hyeok (South Korea)
- Attendance: 9,480
- Weather: Clear and warm 25 °C (77 °F); 62% humidity

Second leg
Guangzhou Evergrande	Al-Ahli
1	0
- Date: 21 November 2015
- Venue: Tianhe Stadium, Guangzhou
- AFC Man of the Match: Elkeson (Guangzhou Evergrande)
- Referee: Ravshan Irmatov (Uzbekistan)
- Attendance: 42,499
- Weather: Hot; 27 °C (81 °F); 88% humidity

The 2015 AFC Champions League final was the final of the 2015 AFC Champions League, the 34th edition of the top-level Asian club football tournament organized by the Asian Football Confederation (AFC), and the 13th under the current AFC Champions League title.

The final was contested in two-legged home-and-away format between Emirati team Al-Ahli and Chinese team Guangzhou Evergrande. The first leg hosted by Al-Ahli at Al-Rashid Stadium in Dubai on 7 November 2015, while the second leg hosted by Guangzhou Evergrande at the Tianhe Stadium in Guangzhou on 21 November 2015. Having previously won the tournament in 2013 Guangzhou Evergrande has making its second final appearance in three years.

Guangzhou Evergrande won the final 1–0 on aggregate and as Asian champions earned the right to represent the AFC at the 2015 FIFA Club World Cup in Japan, entering at the quarterfinal stage.

== Qualified teams ==
Team	Previous finals appearances (bold indicates winners)
(United Arab Emirates) Al-Ahli	None
(China) Guangzhou Evergrande	**2013**

== Venues ==
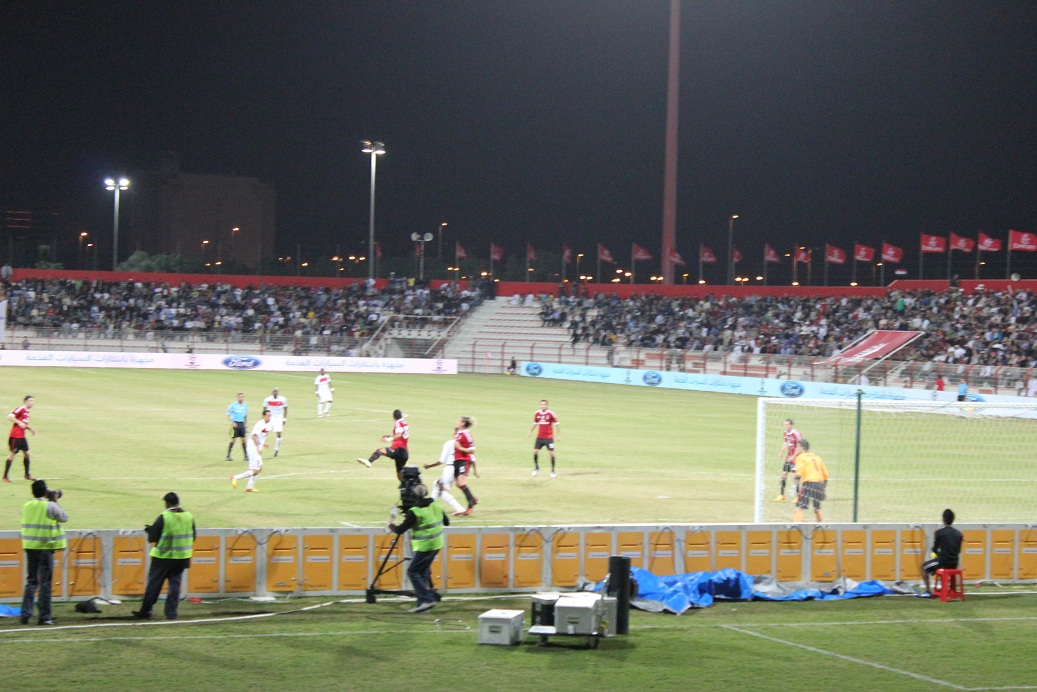
The Al-Rashid Stadium hosted first leg of the final.

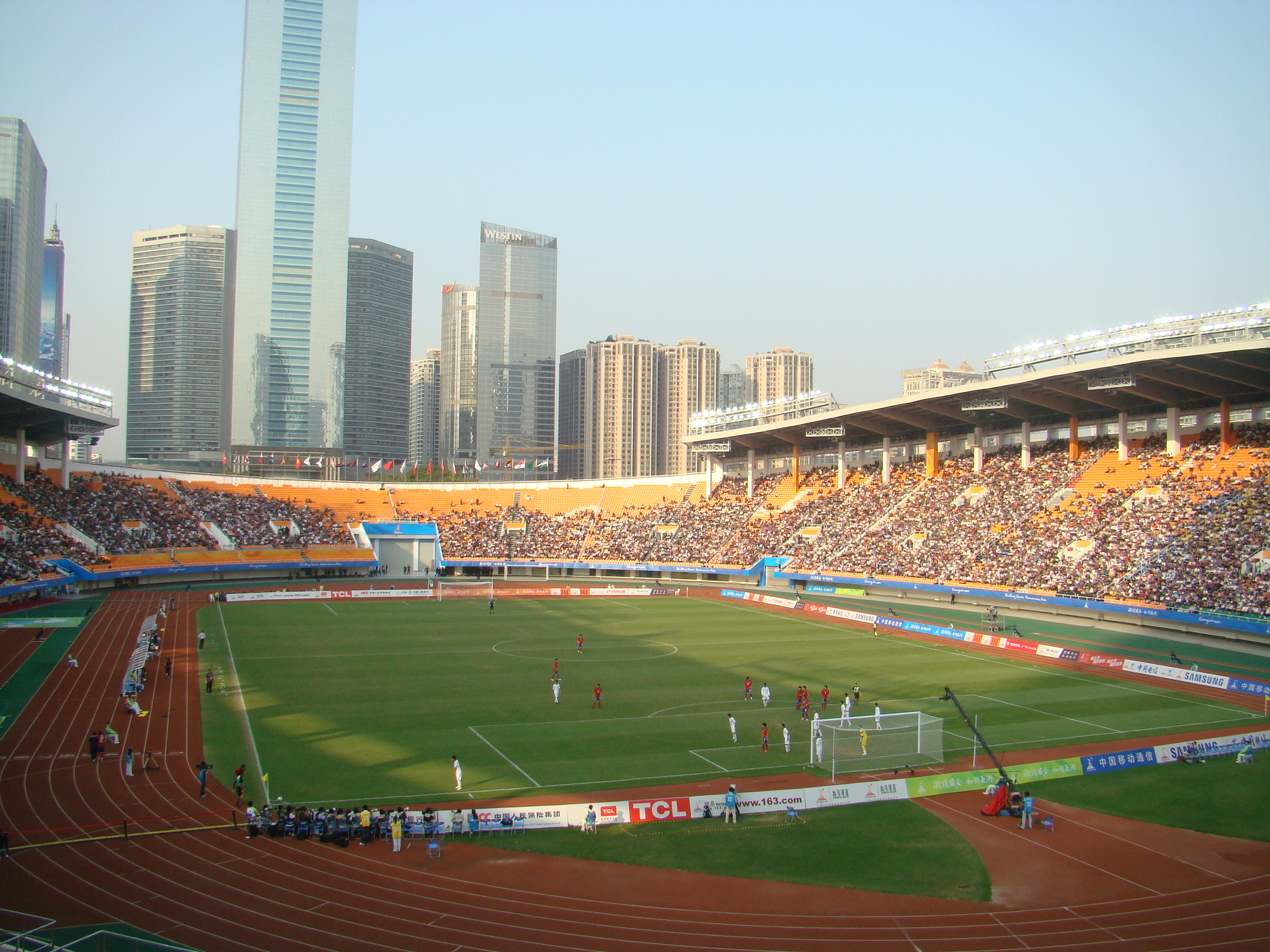
The Tianhe Stadium hosted second leg of the final.

The 2015 AFC Champions League Final was contested in two-legged home-and-away format, held at the home of both finalists. It was the third consecutive year that the AFC adopted such an arrangement.

Al-Ahli's home venue, Al-Rashid Stadium, is a 9,415 seated stadium located in the city of Dubai.

Two previous final has been held in United Arab Emirates. The first one was in the first leg of the 2002–03 final, Al Ain defeated BEC Tero Sasana F.C. 2–0 in Tahnoun bin Mohammed Stadium in the city of Al Ain, and they eventually claimed the title 2–1 on aggregate. The second one was 10 years ago, in the first leg of the 2005 final, Al Ain was defeated by Saudis' team, Al-Ittihad, and they eventually lost the title 3–5 on aggregate.

Guangzhou Evergrande's home venue, Tianhe Stadium, is a 58,500 seated stadium located in the city of Guangzhou.

In the history of the competition, two finals have been held in China and this final will be the third, and the second that Guangzhou hosted. The first final hosted by a Chinese city in 1989–90, which was won by Chinese side Liaoning FC 3–2 against Nissan Yokohama in the city of Shenyang. The next final, the 2013 and second leg of the 2013, was hosted in Guangzhou. The 2013 final was won by Guangzhou Evergrande on the away goals rule with 3–3 on aggregate.

== Road to the final ==
Note: In all results below, the score of the finalist is given first (H: home; A: away).

(United Arab Emirates) Al-Ahli				Round	(China) Guangzhou Evergrande			
Opponent	Result			Group stage	Opponent	Result		
(Saudi Arabia) Al-Ahli	3–3 (H)			Matchday 1	(South Korea) FC Seoul	1–0 (H)		
(Iran) Tractor Sazi	0–1 (A)			Matchday 2	(Australia) Western Sydney Wanderers	3–2 (A)		
(Uzbekistan) FC Nasaf	0–0 (H)			Matchday 3	(Japan) Kashima Antlers	4–3 (H)		
(Uzbekistan) FC Nasaf	1–0 (A)			Matchday 4	(Japan) Kashima Antlers	1–2 (A)		
(Saudi Arabia) Al-Ahli	1–2 (A)			Matchday 5	(South Korea) FC Seoul	0–0 (A)		
(Iran) Tractor Sazi	3–2 (H)			Matchday 6	(Australia) Western Sydney Wanderers	0–2 (H)		
**Group D runners-up**: Pos / Team / Pld / Pts; 1 / (Saudi Arabia) Al-Ahli / 6 / **12**; **2** / (United Arab Emirates) Al-Ahli / **6** / **8**; 3 / (Uzbekistan) Nasaf Qarshi / 6 / **8**; 4 / (Iran) Tractor Sazi / 6 / **4**; Source: AFC				Final standings	**Group H winner**: Pos / Team / Pld / Pts; **1** / (China) Guangzhou Evergrande / **6** / **10**; 2 / (South Korea) FC Seoul / 6 / **9**; 3 / (Australia) Western Sydney Wanderers / 6 / **8**; 4 / (Japan) Kashima Antlers / 6 / **6**; Source: AFC			
Opponent	Agg.	1st leg	2nd leg	Knockout stage	Opponent	Agg.	1st leg	2nd leg
(United Arab Emirates) Al-Ain	3–3 (a)	0–0 (H)	3–3 (A)	Round of 16	(South Korea) Seongnam FC	3–2	1–2 (A)	2–0 (H)
(Iran) Naft Tehran	3–1	1–0 (A)	2–1 (H)	Quarter-finals	(Japan) Kashiwa Reysol	4–2	3–1 (A)	1–1 (H)
(Saudi Arabia) Al-Hilal	4–3	1–1 (A)	3–2 (H)	Semi-finals	(Japan) Gamba Osaka	2–1	2–1 (H)	0–0 (A)

== Rules ==
The final was played on a home-and-away two-legged basis, with the order of legs decided by draw. The away goals rule, extra time (away goals do not apply in extra time) and penalty shoot-out were used to decide the winner if necessary.

== Match details ==
=== First leg ===
==== Details ====
7 November 2015
19:45 UTC+4

Al-Ahli (United Arab Emirates)	0–0	(China) Guangzhou Evergrande
	Report

Al-Rashid Stadium, Dubai
Attendance: 9,480
Referee: Kim Jong-hyeok (South Korea)

**Al-Ahli**	**Guangzhou Evergrande**

GK	12	(United Arab Emirates) Ahmed Mahmoud
RB	26	(United Arab Emirates) Abdulaziz Haikel	(red card) 84'
CB	2	(United Arab Emirates) Salmeen Khamis
CB	21	(South Korea) Kwon Kyung-won	(yellow card) 90+3'
LB	62	(United Arab Emirates) Abdelaziz Sanqour		(substituted off) 72'
RM	8	(Brazil) Everton Ribeiro		(substituted off) 90'
CM	88	(United Arab Emirates) Majed Hassan
LM	4	(United Arab Emirates) Habib Fardan
RF	11	(United Arab Emirates) Ahmed Khalil (c)		(substituted off) 88'
CF	9	(Brazil) Lima
LF	7	(United Arab Emirates) Ismail Al Hammadi
Substitutes:
GK	55	(United Arab Emirates) Majed Naser
DF	5	(United Arab Emirates) Walid Abbas		(substituted on) 72'
DF	80	(United Arab Emirates) Humaid Abdulla		(substituted on) 88'
DF	77	(United Arab Emirates) Yousef Al Sayed
MF	6	(United Arab Emirates) Hassan Abdurahman
MF	71	(United Arab Emirates) Nawaf Mubarak
FW	14	(Morocco) Oussama Assaidi		(substituted on) 90'
Manager:
(Romania) Cosmin Olăroiu

GK	19	(China) Zeng Cheng
RB	5	(China) Zhang Linpeng
CB	3	(China) Mei Fang	(yellow card) 80'
CB	6	(China) Feng Xiaoting
LB	35	(China) Li Xuepeng		(substituted off) 70'
CM	8	(Brazil) Paulinho
CM	10	(China) Zheng Zhi (c)
RW	16	(China) Huang Bowen
AM	11	(Brazil) Ricardo Goulart		(substituted off) 59'
LW	27	(China) Zheng Long		(substituted off) 46'
CF	9	(Brazil) Elkeson	(yellow card) 36'
Substitutes:
GK	22	(China) Li Shuai
DF	17	(China) Liu Jian
MF	2	(China) Liao Lisheng
MF	12	(China) Wang Shangyuan
MF	20	(China) Yu Hanchao		(substituted on) 59'
MF	25	(China) Zou Zheng		(substituted on) 70'
DF	28	(South Korea) Kim Young-gwon
FW	29	(China) Gao Lin		(substituted on) 46'
Manager:
(Brazil) Luiz Felipe Scolari

AFC Man of the Match:
(China) Zheng Zhi (Guangzhou Evergrande)

Assistant referees:
Jeong Hae-sang (South Korea)
Yoon Kwang-yeol (South Korea)
Fourth official:
Kim Hee-gon (South Korea)

==== Statistics ====
First half
	Al-Ahli	Guangzhou Evergrande
Goals scored	0	0
Total shots	2	5
Shots on target	1	1
Saves	1	1
Ball possession	41%	59%
Corner kicks	3	5
Fouls committed	7	4
Offsides	1	0
Yellow cards	0	1
Red cards	0	0

Second half
	Al-Ahli	Guangzhou Evergrande
Goals scored	0	0
Total shots	4	3
Shots on target	3	3
Saves	2	3
Ball possession	47%	53%
Corner kicks	4	1
Fouls committed	13	4
Offsides	1	0
Yellow cards	1	1
Red cards	1	0

Overall
	Al-Ahli	Guangzhou Evergrande
Goals scored	0	0
Total shots	6	8
Shots on target	4	4
Saves	3	4
Ball possession	47%	53%
Corner kicks	7	6
Fouls committed	20	8
Offsides	2	0
Yellow cards	1	2
Red cards	1	0

=== Second leg ===
==== Details ====
21 November 2015
20:00 UTC+8

Guangzhou Evergrande (China)	1–0	(United Arab Emirates) Al-Ahli
Elkeson 54'	Report

Tianhe Stadium, Guangzhou
Attendance: 42,499
Referee: Ravshan Irmatov (Uzbekistan)

**Guangzhou Evergrande**	**Al-Ahli**

GK	19	(China) Zeng Cheng		(substituted off) 38'
RB	5	(China) Zhang Linpeng
CB	6	(China) Feng Xiaoting
CB	28	(South Korea) Kim Young-gwon
LB	25	(China) Zou Zheng	(yellow card) 72'
DM	10	(China) Zheng Zhi (c)
DM	8	(Brazil) Paulinho
AM	11	(Brazil) Ricardo Goulart		(substituted off) 90+1'
RW	16	(China) Huang Bowen	(yellow card) 76'
LW	27	(China) Zheng Long		(substituted off) 87'
CF	9	(Brazil) Elkeson
Substitutes:
GK	22	(China) Li Shuai		(substituted on) 38'
DF	3	(China) Mei Fang
DF	33	(China) Rong Hao
DF	35	(China) Li Xuepeng
MF	17	(China) Liu Jian		(substituted on) 87'
MF	20	(China) Yu Hanchao
FW	29	(China) Gao Lin		(substituted on) 90+1'
Manager:
(Brazil) Luiz Felipe Scolari

GK	12	(United Arab Emirates) Ahmed Mahmoud
RB	62	(United Arab Emirates) Abdelaziz Sanqour
CB	2	(United Arab Emirates) Salmeen Khamis	(red card) 67'
CB	21	(South Korea) Kwon Kyung-won
LB	5	(United Arab Emirates) Walid Abbas
RM	8	(Brazil) Everton Ribeiro
CM	88	(United Arab Emirates) Majed Hassan	(yellow card) 11'	(substituted off) 90+3'
LM	4	(United Arab Emirates) Habib Fardan		(substituted off) 65'
RF	9	(Brazil) Lima
CF	11	(United Arab Emirates) Ahmed Khalil (c)		(substituted off) 63'
LF	7	(United Arab Emirates) Ismail Al Hammadi
Substitutes:
GK	55	(United Arab Emirates) Majed Naser
DF	57	(United Arab Emirates) Mohamed Sebil		(substituted on) 90+3'
DF	80	(United Arab Emirates) Humaid Abbas		(substituted on) 65'
MF	6	(United Arab Emirates) Hassan Abdurahman
MF	70	(United Arab Emirates) Waleed Hussain
MF	71	(United Arab Emirates) Nawaf Mubarak
FW	14	(Morocco) Oussama Assaidi		(substituted on) 63'
Manager:
(Romania) Cosmin Olăroiu

AFC Man of the Match:
(Brazil) Elkeson (Guangzhou Evergrande)

Assistant referees:
Abdukhamidullo Rasulov (Uzbekistan)
Jahongir Saidov (Uzbekistan)
Fourth official:
Valentin Kovalenko (Uzbekistan)

==== Statistics ====
First half
	Guangzhou Evergrande	Al-Ahli
Goals scored	0	0
Total shots	6	3
Shots on target	3	2
Saves	2	3
Ball possession	53%	47%
Corner kicks	3	0
Fouls committed	5	5
Offsides	1	1
Yellow cards	0	1
Red cards	0	0

Second half
	Guangzhou Evergrande	Al-Ahli
Goals scored	1	0
Total shots	3	1
Shots on target	1	0
Saves	0	0
Ball possession	57%	43%
Corner kicks	2	1
Fouls committed	7	11
Offsides	0	3
Yellow cards	2	0
Red cards	0	1

Overall
	Guangzhou Evergrande	Al-Ahli
Goals scored	1	0
Total shots	9	4
Shots on target	4	2
Saves	2	3
Ball possession	57%	43%
Corner kicks	5	1
Fouls committed	12	16
Offsides	1	4
Yellow cards	2	1
Red cards	0	1
