= 2015 AFC Champions League qualifying play-off =

International football tournament

The 2015 AFC Champions League qualifying play-off was played from 4 to 17 February 2015. A total of 25 teams competed in the qualifying play-off to decide eight of the 32 places in the group stage of the 2015 AFC Champions League.

== Format ==
The bracket for the qualifying play-off, which consisted of three rounds (preliminary round 1, preliminary round 2, and play-off round), was determined by the AFC based on the association ranking of each team. Each tie was played as a single match, with the team from the higher-ranked association hosting the match. Extra time and penalty shoot-out were used to decide the winner if necessary. The winners of each tie in the play-off round advanced to the group stage to join the 24 automatic qualifiers. All losers in each round which were from associations with only play-off slots entered the AFC Cup group stage.

== Teams ==
The following 25 teams (11 from West Zone, 14 from East Zone) were involved in the qualifying play-off:

Zone	Teams entering in play-off round	Teams entering in preliminary round 2	Teams entering in preliminary round 1
West Zone	(Saudi Arabia) Al-Ahli; (Iran) Naft Tehran; (Uzbekistan) Bunyodkor; (United Arab Emirates) Al-Wahda; (United Arab Emirates) Al-Jazira	(Qatar) Al-Sadd; (Qatar) El Jaish; (Kuwait) Al-Qadsia; (Jordan) Al-Wehdat; (Oman) Al-Nahda; (Bahrain) Riffa	
East Zone	(South Korea) FC Seoul; (Japan) Kashiwa Reysol; (Australia) Central Coast Mariners; (China) Beijing Guoan	(China) Guangzhou R&F; (Thailand) Bangkok Glass; (Thailand) Chonburi; (Vietnam) Hà Nội T&T; (Indonesia) Persib Bandung; (Hong Kong) Kitchee	(Myanmar) Yadanarbon; (Malaysia) Johor Darul Ta'zim; (India) Bengaluru FC; (Singapore) Warriors

== Schedule ==
The schedule of the competition was as follows.

Round	Match date
Preliminary round 1	4 February 2015
Preliminary round 2	10 February 2015
Play-off round	17 February 2015

== Bracket ==
=== Play-off West 1 ===
Al-Ahli advanced to Group D.

Preliminary round 1	Preliminary round 2		Play-off round
			(Saudi Arabia) Al-Ahli (a.e.t.)	2
			(Kuwait) Al-Qadsia	1
	(Kuwait) Al-Qadsia	1
	(Jordan) Al-Wehdat	0

=== Play-off West 2 ===
Naft Tehran advanced to Group B.

Preliminary round 1	Preliminary round 2		Play-off round
			(Iran) Naft Tehran	1
			(Qatar) El Jaish	0
	(Qatar) El Jaish	2
	(Oman) Al-Nahda	1

=== Play-off West 3 ===
Bunyodkor advanced to Group A.

Preliminary round 1	Preliminary round 2	Play-off round
		(Uzbekistan) Bunyodkor	2
		(United Arab Emirates) Al-Jazira	1

=== Play-off West 4 ===
Al-Sadd advanced to Group C.

Preliminary round 1	Preliminary round 2		Play-off round
			(United Arab Emirates) Al-Wahda	4(4)
			(Qatar) Al-Sadd (p)	4(5)
	(Qatar) Al-Sadd (p)	1(11)
	(Bahrain) Riffa	1(10)

=== Play-off East 1 ===
FC Seoul advanced to Group H.

Preliminary round 1	Preliminary round 2		Play-off round
			(South Korea) FC Seoul	7
			(Vietnam) Hà Nội T&T	0
	(Vietnam) Hà Nội T&T	4
	(Indonesia) Persib Bandung	0

=== Play-off East 2 ===
Kashiwa Reysol advanced to Group E.

Preliminary round 1	Preliminary round 2		Play-off round
			(Japan) Kashiwa Reysol (a.e.t.)	3
			(Thailand) Chonburi	2
	(Thailand) Chonburi	4
	(Hong Kong) Kitchee	1

=== Play-off East 3 ===
Guangzhou R&F advanced to Group F.

Preliminary round 1		Preliminary round 2		Play-off round
				(Australia) Central Coast Mariners	1
				(China) Guangzhou R&F	3
		(China) Guangzhou R&F	3
(Myanmar) Yadanarbon	1(5)	(Singapore) Warriors	0
(Singapore) Warriors (p)	1(6)

=== Play-off East 4 ===
Beijing Guoan advanced to Group G.

Preliminary round 1		Preliminary round 2		Play-off round
				(China) Beijing Guoan	3
				(Thailand) Bangkok Glass	0
		(Thailand) Bangkok Glass	3
(Malaysia) Johor Darul Ta'zim (a.e.t.)	2	(Malaysia) Johor Darul Ta'zim	0
(India) Bengaluru FC	1

== Preliminary round 1 ==
East Zone
Team 1	Score	Team 2
Yadanarbon (Myanmar)	1–1 (a.e.t.) (5–6 p)	(Singapore) Warriors
Johor Darul Ta'zim (Malaysia)	2–1 (a.e.t.)	(India) Bengaluru FC

4 February 2015
16:00 UTC+6:30

Yadanarbon (Myanmar)	1–1 (a.e.t.)	(Singapore) Warriors
Ye Win Aung 102'	Report	Andy 99'
Penalties
Djawa (penalty scored); Yan Paing (penalty scored); Okpechi (penalty scored); Thiha Sithu (penalty scored); Boakay (penalty scored); Sithu Aung (penalty missed)	5–6	(penalty scored) Shi J.Y. (penalty scored) Beattie; (penalty scored) Bennett; (penalty scored) Vidošević; (penalty scored) Vélez; (penalty scored) Andy

Mandalarthiri Stadium, Mandalay
Attendance: 21,400
Referee: Hettikamkanamge Perera (Sri Lanka)

4 February 2015
20:45 UTC+8

Johor Darul Ta'zim (Malaysia)	2–1 (a.e.t.)	(India) Bengaluru FC
Hariss 47'; Chanturu 97'	Report	Lyngdoh 90'

Larkin Stadium, Johor Bahru
Attendance: 17,455
Referee: Yudai Yamamoto (Japan)

== Preliminary round 2 ==
West Zone
Team 1	Score	Team 2
Al-Qadsia (Kuwait)	1–0	(Jordan) Al-Wehdat
El Jaish (Qatar)	2–1	(Oman) Al-Nahda
Al-Sadd (Qatar)	0–0 (a.e.t.) (11–10 p)	(Bahrain) Riffa

East Zone
Team 1	Score	Team 2
Hà Nội T&T (Vietnam)	4–0	(Indonesia) Persib Bandung
Chonburi (Thailand)	4–1	(Hong Kong) Kitchee
Guangzhou R&F (China)	3–0	(Singapore) Warriors
Bangkok Glass (Thailand)	3–0	(Malaysia) Johor Darul Ta'zim

10 February 2015
18:00 UTC+7

Hà Nội T&T (Vietnam)	4–0	(Indonesia) Persib Bandung
Marronkle 33' (pen.), 57'; Samson 46', 71'	Report

Mỹ Đình National Stadium, Hanoi
Attendance: 2,500
Referee: Jarred Gillett (Australia)

10 February 2015
19:30 UTC+8

Guangzhou R&F (China)	3–0	(Singapore) Warriors
Jiang Zhipeng 53'; Jang Hyun-soo 60'; Zhang Shuo 75'	Report

Yuexiushan Stadium, Guangzhou
Attendance: 7,883
Referee: Minoru Tōjō (Japan)

10 February 2015
19:00 UTC+7

Chonburi (Thailand)	4–1	(Hong Kong) Kitchee
Assumpção 8', 39', 55'; Nurul 27'	Report	E. Wan 35'

Chonburi Stadium, Chonburi
Attendance: 3,432
Referee: Kim Sang-woo (South Korea)

10 February 2015
19:00 UTC+7

Bangkok Glass (Thailand)	3–0	(Malaysia) Johor Darul Ta'zim
Narong 28'; Kaimbi 52', 62'	Report

Leo Stadium, Pathum Thani
Attendance: 5,299
Referee: Chris Beath (Australia)

10 February 2015
18:00 UTC+3

El Jaish (Qatar)	2–1	(Oman) Al-Nahda
Wagner Ribeiro 78'; Romarinho 90+2'	Report	Voullany 4'

Thani bin Jassim Stadium, Al Rayyan
Attendance: 5,507
Referee: Mohd Amirul Izwan Bin Yaacob (Malaysia)

10 February 2015
18:15 UTC+3

Al-Qadsia (Kuwait)	1–0	(Jordan) Al-Wehdat
Said 60'	Report

Al Kuwait Sports Club Stadium, Kuwait City
Attendance: 9,200
Referee: Mohanad Qasim Eesee Sarray (Iraq)

10 February 2015
18:30 UTC+3

Al-Sadd (Qatar)	0–0 (a.e.t.)	(Bahrain) Riffa
	Report
Penalties
Ibrahim (penalty scored); Al-Haydos (penalty scored); Majid (penalty missed); Hassan (penalty scored); Belhadj (penalty scored); Kasola (penalty scored); Nabeel (penalty scored); Lee J.S. (penalty scored); Yahia (penalty scored); Khoder (penalty scored); Al-Sheeb (penalty scored); Ibrahim (penalty scored)	11–10	(penalty missed) Ozéia; (penalty scored) João Luiz; (penalty scored) Galeb; (penalty scored) Deeb; (penalty scored) Salman; (penalty scored) Saeed; (penalty scored) Mubarak; (penalty scored) Al Amer; (penalty scored) Shalal; (penalty scored) Al-Hooti; (penalty scored) Alawi; (penalty missed) Ozéia

Jassim Bin Hamad Stadium, Al Rayyan
Attendance: 2,500
Referee: Muhammad Taqi Aljaafari Bin Jahari (Singapore)

== Play-off round ==
West Zone
Team 1	Score	Team 2
Al-Ahli (Saudi Arabia)	2–1 (a.e.t.)	(Kuwait) Al-Qadsia
Naft Tehran (Iran)	1–0	(Qatar) El Jaish
Bunyodkor (Uzbekistan)	2–1	(United Arab Emirates) Al-Jazira
Al-Wahda (United Arab Emirates)	4–4 (a.e.t.) (4–5 p)	(Qatar) Al-Sadd

East Zone
Team 1	Score	Team 2
FC Seoul (South Korea)	7–0	(Vietnam) Hà Nội T&T
Kashiwa Reysol (Japan)	3–2 (a.e.t.)	(Thailand) Chonburi
Central Coast Mariners (Australia)	1–3	(China) Guangzhou R&F
Beijing Guoan (China)	3–0	(Thailand) Bangkok Glass

17 February 2015
19:30 UTC+11

Central Coast Mariners (Australia)	1–3	(China) Guangzhou R&F
Trifiro 90+2'	Report	Jiang Ning 8'; Lu Lin 57'; J. Rose 89' (o.g.)

Central Coast Stadium, Gosford
Attendance: 2,776
Referee: Kim Dong-jin (South Korea)

17 February 2015
19:00 UTC+9

Kashiwa Reysol (Japan)	3–2 (a.e.t.)	(Thailand) Chonburi
Taketomi 8'; Leandro 58' (pen.), 115'	Report	Assumpção 10'; Kroekrit 65'

Hitachi Kashiwa Soccer Stadium, Kashiwa
Attendance: 6,344
Referee: Peter Green (Australia)

17 February 2015
18:00 UTC+8

Beijing Guoan (China)	3–0	(Thailand) Bangkok Glass
Song Boxuan 17'; Batalla 64' (pen.), 72'	Report

Workers Stadium, Beijing
Attendance: 21,017
Referee: Ko Hyung-jin (South Korea)

17 February 2015
19:30 UTC+9

FC Seoul (South Korea)	7–0	(Vietnam) Hà Nội T&T
Yun Il-lok 14'; Éverton Santos 20'; Jung Jo-gook 30', 46'; Escudero 40'; Lee Seok-hyun 70'; Koh Myong-jin 72'	Report

Seoul World Cup Stadium, Seoul
Attendance: 6,718
Referee: Ryuji Sato (Japan)

17 February 2015
17:00 UTC+5

Bunyodkor (Uzbekistan)	2–1	(United Arab Emirates) Al-Jazira
Shodiev 23'; Rashidov 52'	Report	Mabkhout 45+1' (pen.)

Bunyodkor Stadium, Tashkent
Attendance: 9,263
Referee: Alireza Faghani (Iran)

17 February 2015
18:00 UTC+3:30

Naft Tehran (Iran)	1–0	(Qatar) El Jaish
Motahari 50'	Report

Azadi Stadium, Tehran
Attendance: 5,750
Referee: Ravshan Irmatov (Uzbekistan)

17 February 2015
19:10 UTC+4

Al-Wahda (United Arab Emirates)	4–4 (a.e.t.)	(Qatar) Al-Sadd
Díaz 8'; Omar 72'; Al-Shehhi 90+2'; Matar 108'	Report	Ahmed 55'; Ibrahim 66', 90+7', 98'
Penalties
Al-Shehhi (penalty scored); Al-Noubi (penalty scored); Omar (penalty missed); Matar (penalty scored); Saleh (penalty scored); Fadhel (penalty missed)	4–5	(penalty scored) Ibrahim; (penalty scored) Al-Haidos; (penalty missed) Grafite; (penalty scored) Majid; (penalty scored) Belhadj; (penalty scored) Hassan

Al Nahyan Stadium, Abu Dhabi
Attendance: 4,208
Referee: Abdullah Al Hilali (Oman)

17 February 2015
20:10 UTC+3

Al-Ahli (Saudi Arabia)	2–1 (a.e.t.)	(Kuwait) Al-Qadsia
Al Soma 85' (pen.); Al-Bassas 115'	Report	Al-Mutawa 33'

King Abdullah Sports City, Jeddah
Attendance: 34,028
Referee: Nawaf Shukralla (Bahrain)
