= 2015 AFC Champions League knockout stage =

Football tournament knockout stage

The 2015 AFC Champions League knockout stage was played from 19 May to 21 November 2015. A total of 16 teams competed in the knockout stage to decide the champions of the 2015 AFC Champions League.

== Qualified teams ==
The winners and runners-up of each of the eight groups in the group stage qualified for the knockout stage. Both West Zone and East Zone had eight teams qualified.

Zone	Group	Winners	Runners-up
West Zone (Groups A–D)	A	(Qatar) Lekhwiya	(Iran) Persepolis
West Zone (Groups A–D)	B	(United Arab Emirates) Al-Ain	(Iran) Naft Tehran
West Zone (Groups A–D)	C	(Saudi Arabia) Al-Hilal	(Qatar) Al-Sadd
West Zone (Groups A–D)	D	(Saudi Arabia) Al-Ahli	(United Arab Emirates) Al-Ahli
East Zone (Groups E–H)	E	(Japan) Kashiwa Reysol	(South Korea) Jeonbuk Hyundai Motors
East Zone (Groups E–H)	F	(Japan) Gamba Osaka	(South Korea) Seongnam FC
East Zone (Groups E–H)	G	(China) Beijing Guoan	(South Korea) Suwon Samsung Bluewings
East Zone (Groups E–H)	H	(China) Guangzhou Evergrande	(South Korea) FC Seoul

== Format ==
In the knockout stage, the 16 teams played a single-elimination tournament, with the teams split between the two zones until the final. Each tie was played on a home-and-away two-legged basis. The away goals rule, extra time (away goals do not apply in extra time) and penalty shoot-out were used to decide the winner if necessary.

== Schedule ==
The schedule of each round was as follows.

Round	First leg	Second leg
Round of 16	19–20 May 2015	26–27 May 2015
Quarter-finals	25–26 August 2015	15–16 September 2015
Semi-finals	29–30 September 2015	20–21 October 2015
Final	7 November 2015	21 November 2015

== Bracket ==
In the round of 16, the winners of one group played the runners-up of another group in the same zone, with the group winners hosting the second leg. The matchups are determined as follows:

West Zone

- Winner Group A vs. Runner-up Group C
- Winner Group C vs. Runner-up Group A
- Winner Group B vs. Runner-up Group D
- Winner Group D vs. Runner-up Group B

East Zone

- Winner Group E vs. Runner-up Group G
- Winner Group G vs. Runner-up Group E
- Winner Group F vs. Runner-up Group H
- Winner Group H vs. Runner-up Group F

The draw for the quarter-finals was held on 18 June 2015, 16:00 UTC+8, at the Grand Millennium Hotel in Kuala Lumpur, Malaysia. Teams from different zones could not be drawn into the same tie, and there was no seeding or country protection, so teams from the same association could be drawn into the same tie.

In the semi-finals, the matchups were determined by the quarter-final draw: Winner QF1 vs. Winner QF2 (West Zone) and Winner QF3 vs. Winner QF4 (East Zone), with winners QF2 and QF4 hosting the second leg.

In the final, the finalist from the West Zone hosted the first leg, while the finalist from the East Zone hosted the second leg (no draw was held to determine the order of legs, as it was reversed from the previous season's final).

Round of 16
(Iran) Persepolis	1	0	1
(Saudi Arabia) Al-Hilal	0	3	3
(Qatar) Al-Sadd	1	2	3
(Qatar) Lekhwiya	2	2	4
(Iran) Naft Tehran (a)	1	1	2
(Saudi Arabia) Al-Ahli	0	2	2
(United Arab Emirates) Al-Ahli (a)	0	3	3
(United Arab Emirates) Al-Ain	0	3	3
(South Korea) Suwon Bluewings	2	2	4
(Japan) Kashiwa Reysol (a)	3	1	4
(South Korea) Seongnam FC	2	0	2
(China) Guangzhou Evergrande	1	2	3
(South Korea) Jeonbuk Motors	1	1	2
(China) Beijing Guoan	1	0	1
(South Korea) FC Seoul	1	2	3
(Japan) Gamba Osaka	3	3	6

Quarter-finals
(Saudi Arabia) Al-Hilal	4	2	6
(Qatar) Lekhwiya	1	2	3
(Iran) Naft Tehran	0	1	1
(United Arab Emirates) Al-Ahli	1	2	3
(Japan) Kashiwa Reysol	1	1	2
(China) Guangzhou Evergrande	3	1	4
(South Korea) Jeonbuk Motors	0	2	2
(Japan) Gamba Osaka	0	3	3

Semi-finals
(Saudi Arabia) Al-Hilal	1	2	3
(United Arab Emirates) Al-Ahli	1	3	4
(China) Guangzhou Evergrande	2	0	2
(Japan) Gamba Osaka	1	0	1

Final
(United Arab Emirates) Al-Ahli	0	0	0
(China) Guangzhou Evergrande	0	1	1

== Round of 16 ==
West Zone
Team 1	Agg.	Team 2	1st leg	2nd leg
Al-Sadd (Qatar)	3–4	(Qatar) Lekhwiya	1–2	2–2
Persepolis (Iran)	1–3	(Saudi Arabia) Al-Hilal	1–0	0–3
Al-Ahli (United Arab Emirates)	3–3 (a)	(United Arab Emirates) Al-Ain	0–0	3–3
Naft Tehran (Iran)	2–2 (a)	(Saudi Arabia) Al-Ahli	1–0	1–2

East Zone
Team 1	Agg.	Team 2	1st leg	2nd leg
Suwon Samsung Bluewings (South Korea)	4–4 (a)	(Japan) Kashiwa Reysol	2–3	2–1
Jeonbuk Hyundai Motors (South Korea)	2–1	(China) Beijing Guoan	1–1	1–0
FC Seoul (South Korea)	3–6	(Japan) Gamba Osaka	1–3	2–3
Seongnam FC (South Korea)	2–3	(China) Guangzhou Evergrande	2–1	0–2

=== First leg ===
19 May 2015
19:00 UTC+9

Jeonbuk Hyundai Motors (South Korea)	1–1	(China) Beijing Guoan
Kim Kee-hee 13'	Report	Batalla 85' (pen.)

Jeonju World Cup Stadium, Jeonju
Attendance: 12,409
Referee: Valentin Kovalenko (Uzbekistan)

19 May 2015
19:30 UTC+9

Suwon Samsung Bluewings (South Korea)	2–3	(Japan) Kashiwa Reysol
Yeom Ki-hun 1'; Jong Tae-se 59'	Report	Barada 12'; Leandro 29' (pen.), 56'

Suwon World Cup Stadium, Suwon
Attendance: 6,164
Referee: Ammar Al-Jeneibi (United Arab Emirates)

19 May 2015
19:30 UTC+4:30

Persepolis (Iran)	1–0	(Saudi Arabia) Al-Hilal
Digão 90+2' (o.g.)	Report

Azadi Stadium, Tehran
Attendance: 100,000
Referee: Nagor Amir Noor Mohamed (Malaysia)

19 May 2015
19:15 UTC+3

Al-Sadd (Qatar)	1–2	(Qatar) Lekhwiya
Al-Haydos 37'	Report	Soria 13'; Msakni 36'

Jassim Bin Hamad Stadium, Al Rayyan
Attendance: 4,682
Referee: Ravshan Irmatov (Uzbekistan)

20 May 2015
19:30 UTC+9

Seongnam FC (South Korea)	2–1	(China) Guangzhou Evergrande
Jorginho 23'; Kim Do-heon 90+5' (pen.)	Report	Huang Bowen 42'

Tancheon Sports Complex, Seongnam
Attendance: 13,792
Referee: Mohsen Torky (Iran)

20 May 2015
19:30 UTC+9

FC Seoul (South Korea)	1–3	(Japan) Gamba Osaka
Yun Ju-tae 90+2'	Report	Usami 63', 86'; Yonekura 74'

Seoul World Cup Stadium, Seoul
Attendance: 10,607
Referee: Mohanad Qasim Eesee Sarray (Iraq)

20 May 2015
20:00 UTC+4:30

Naft Tehran (Iran)	1–0	(Saudi Arabia) Al-Ahli
Rezaei 34'	Report

Azadi Stadium, Tehran
Attendance: 13,370
Referee: Yudai Yamamoto (Japan)

20 May 2015
19:45 UTC+4

Al-Ahli (United Arab Emirates)	0–0	(United Arab Emirates) Al-Ain
	Report

Al-Rashid Stadium, Dubai
Attendance: 8,900
Referee: Ko Hyung-jin (South Korea)

=== Second leg ===
26 May 2015
19:00 UTC+9

Kashiwa Reysol (Japan)	1–2	(South Korea) Suwon Samsung Bluewings
Kobayashi 65'	Report	Jong Tae-se 26'; Koo Ja-ryong 54'

Hitachi Kashiwa Soccer Stadium, Kashiwa
Attendance: 9,142
Referee: Nawaf Shukralla (Bahrain)

4–4 on aggregate. Kashiwa Reysol won on away goals.

26 May 2015
19:30 UTC+8

Beijing Guoan (China)	0–1	(South Korea) Jeonbuk Hyundai Motors
	Report	Edu 73'

Workers Stadium, Beijing
Attendance: 43,526
Referee: Mohammed Abdulla Hassan Mohamed (United Arab Emirates)

Jeonbuk Hyundai Motors won 2–1 on aggregate.

26 May 2015
19:00 UTC+3

Lekhwiya (Qatar)	2–2	(Qatar) Al-Sadd
Msakni 13'; Mohammad 83'	Report	Muriqui 36'; Assadalla 63'

Abdullah bin Khalifa Stadium, Doha
Attendance: 4,241
Referee: Masaaki Toma (Japan)

Lekhwiya won 4–3 on aggregate.

26 May 2015
21:05 UTC+3

Al-Hilal (Saudi Arabia)	3–0	(Iran) Persepolis
Al-Salem 29'; Al-Shalhoub 57' (pen.); A. Al-Dawsari 90+1'	Report

King Fahd International Stadium, Riyadh
Attendance: 23,590
Referee: Valentin Kovalenko (Uzbekistan)

Al-Hilal won 3–1 on aggregate.

27 May 2015
19:00 UTC+9

Gamba Osaka (Japan)	3–2	(South Korea) FC Seoul
Patric 16'; Kurata 45'; Lins 86'	Report	Yun Ju-tae 58', 90+2'

Osaka Expo '70 Stadium, Suita
Attendance: 9,597
Referee: Alireza Faghani (Iran)

Gamba Osaka won 6–3 on aggregate.

27 May 2015
20:00 UTC+8

Guangzhou Evergrande (China)	2–0	(South Korea) Seongnam FC
Goulart 27' (pen.), 57'	Report

Tianhe Stadium, Guangzhou
Attendance: 48,761
Referee: Ravshan Irmatov (Uzbekistan)

Guangzhou Evergrande won 3–2 on aggregate.

27 May 2015
19:50 UTC+4

Al-Ain (United Arab Emirates)	3–3	(United Arab Emirates) Al-Ahli
Gyan 5', 78'; Eisa 90+2'	Report	Khamis 51'; Khalil 53', 56'

Hazza Bin Zayed Stadium, Al Ain
Attendance: 14,270
Referee: Mohanad Qasim Eesee Sarray (Iraq)

3–3 on aggregate. Al-Ahli won on away goals.

27 May 2015
20:45 UTC+3

Al-Ahli (Saudi Arabia)	2–1	(Iran) Naft Tehran
Al Soma 36', 42'	Report	Padovani 31'

King Abdullah Sports City, Jeddah
Attendance: 35,488
Referee: Kim Dong-jin (South Korea)

2–2 on aggregate. Naft Tehran won on away goals.

== Quarter-finals ==
West Zone
Team 1	Agg.	Team 2	1st leg	2nd leg
Al-Hilal (Saudi Arabia)	6–3	(Qatar) Lekhwiya	4–1	2–2
Naft Tehran (Iran)	1–3	(United Arab Emirates) Al-Ahli	0–1	1–2

East Zone
Team 1	Agg.	Team 2	1st leg	2nd leg
Kashiwa Reysol (Japan)	2–4	(China) Guangzhou Evergrande	1–3	1–1
Jeonbuk Hyundai Motors (South Korea)	2–3	(Japan) Gamba Osaka	0–0	2–3

=== First leg ===
25 August 2015
19:00 UTC+9

Kashiwa Reysol (Japan)	1–3	(China) Guangzhou Evergrande
Kudo 89'	Report	Suzuki 5' (o.g.); Paulinho 40'; Gao Lin 58'

Hitachi Kashiwa Soccer Stadium, Kashiwa
Attendance: 14,030
Referee: Fahad Al-Mirdasi (Saudi Arabia)

25 August 2015
20:50 UTC+3

Al-Hilal (Saudi Arabia)	4–1	(Qatar) Lekhwiya
Aílton 11'; Kaabi 34'; Eduardo 36', 86'	Report	Msakni 17'

King Fahd International Stadium, Riyadh
Attendance: 1,190
Referee: Ben Williams (Australia)

26 August 2015
19:00 UTC+9

Jeonbuk Hyundai Motors (South Korea)	0–0	(Japan) Gamba Osaka
	Report

Jeonju World Cup Stadium, Jeonju
Attendance: 23,633
Referee: Mohd Amirul Izwan Bin Yaacob (Malaysia)

26 August 2015
19:00 UTC+4:30

Naft Tehran (Iran)	0–1	(United Arab Emirates) Al-Ahli
	Report	Lima 62'

Azadi Stadium, Tehran
Attendance: 23,300
Referee: Minoru Tōjō (Japan)

Notes

1. Al-Hilal played their quarter-final home match behind closed doors due to crowd trouble.

=== Second leg ===
15 September 2015
20:00 UTC+8

Guangzhou Evergrande (China)	1–1	(Japan) Kashiwa Reysol
Huang Bowen 30'	Report	Cristiano 12'

Tianhe Stadium, Guangzhou
Attendance: 48,643
Referee: Alireza Faghani (Iran)

Guangzhou Evergrande won 4–2 on aggregate.

15 September 2015
19:00 UTC+3

Lekhwiya (Qatar)	2–2	(Saudi Arabia) Al-Hilal
Mohammad 45+2'; Flores 72'	Report	Eduardo 26'; Digão 87'

Abdullah bin Khalifa Stadium, Doha
Attendance: 5,439
Referee: Ryuji Sato (Japan)

Al-Hilal won 6–3 on aggregate.

16 September 2015
19:00 UTC+9

Gamba Osaka (Japan)	3–2	(South Korea) Jeonbuk Hyundai Motors
Patric 14'; Kurata 76'; Yonekura 90+3'	Report	Leonardo 13' (pen.); Vera 88'

Osaka Expo '70 Stadium, Suita
Attendance: 9,284
Referee: Mohammed Abdulla Hassan Mohamed (United Arab Emirates)

Gamba Osaka won 3–2 on aggregate.

16 September 2015
20:25 UTC+4

Al-Ahli (United Arab Emirates)	2–1	(Iran) Naft Tehran
Lima 26'; Khalil 48' (pen.)	Report	Amiri 50'

Al-Rashid Stadium, Dubai
Attendance: 9,353
Referee: Kim Jong-hyeok (South Korea)

Al-Ahli won 3–1 on aggregate.

== Semi-finals ==
West Zone
Team 1	Agg.	Team 2	1st leg	2nd leg
Al-Hilal (Saudi Arabia)	3–4	(United Arab Emirates) Al-Ahli	1–1	2–3

East Zone
Team 1	Agg.	Team 2	1st leg	2nd leg
Guangzhou Evergrande (China)	2–1	(Japan) Gamba Osaka	2–1	0–0

=== First leg ===
29 September 2015
20:15 UTC+3

Al-Hilal (Saudi Arabia)	1–1	(United Arab Emirates) Al-Ahli
Aílton 82'	Report	Lima 57'

King Fahd International Stadium, Riyadh
Attendance: 53,268
Referee: Valentin Kovalenko (Uzbekistan)

30 September 2015
20:00 UTC+8

Guangzhou Evergrande (China)	2–1	(Japan) Gamba Osaka
Huang Bowen 36'; Zheng Zhi 57'	Report	Feng Xiaoting 13' (o.g.)

Tianhe Stadium, Guangzhou
Attendance: 48,946
Referee: Nawaf Shukralla (Bahrain)

=== Second leg ===
20 October 2015
19:45 UTC+4

Al-Ahli (United Arab Emirates)	3–2	(Saudi Arabia) Al-Hilal
Lima 17'; Ribeiro 45'; Kwon Kyung-won 90+5'	Report	Aílton 51'; Eduardo 64'

Al-Rashid Stadium, Dubai
Attendance: 9,800
Referee: Nawaf Shukralla (Bahrain)

Al-Ahli won 4–3 on aggregate.

21 October 2015
19:00 UTC+9

Gamba Osaka (Japan)	0–0	(China) Guangzhou Evergrande
	Report

Osaka Expo '70 Stadium, Suita
Attendance: 17,310
Referee: Chris Beath (Australia)

Guangzhou Evergrande won 2–1 on aggregate.

== Final ==
Team 1	Agg.	Team 2	1st leg	2nd leg
Al-Ahli (United Arab Emirates)	0–1	(China) Guangzhou Evergrande	0–0	0–1

7 November 2015
19:45 UTC+4

Al-Ahli (United Arab Emirates)	0–0	(China) Guangzhou Evergrande
	Report

Al-Rashid Stadium, Dubai
Attendance: 9,480
Referee: Kim Jong-hyeok (South Korea)
21 November 2015
20:00 UTC+8

Guangzhou Evergrande (China)	1–0	(United Arab Emirates) Al-Ahli
Elkeson 54'	Report

Tianhe Stadium, Guangzhou
Attendance: 42,499
Referee: Ravshan Irmatov (Uzbekistan)

Guangzhou Evergrande won 1–0 on aggregate.
