= Kwon Yeong-jin =

Kwon Yeong-jin (권영진) may refer to:

- Kwon Yong-jin, North Korean general
- Kwon Young-jin (politician) (born 1962), South Korean politician
- Kwon Young-jin (footballer) (born 1991), South Korean footballer
- Kwon Young-jin (wrestler), South Korean freestyle wrestler
