= Hamza Karimov =

Uzbekistani footballer

Personal information
- Full name: Hamza Karimov
- Date of birth: 10 December 1980 (age 45)
- Place of birth: Uzbek SSR, Soviet Union
- Height: 1.82 m (6 ft 0 in)
- Positions: Midfielder; defender

Team information
- Current team: FC Andijon
- Number: 14

Senior career*
Years	Team	Apps	(Gls)
2003–2005	Buxoro FK	78	(8)
2006–2007	FK Mashʼal Mubarek	55	(1)
2008–2010	FC Nasaf	61	(2)
2011–2013	FC Shurtan Guzar	37	(1)
2013–2015	FC Nasaf	56	(1)
2016	Qizilqum	4	(0)
2017	FC Neftchi	10	(0)
2017–	FC Andijon	?	(?)

International career
2007–2009	Uzbekistan	7	(0)
- * Club domestic league appearances and goals as of 9 November 2017

Hamza Karimov (born 10 December 1980) is an Uzbekistanassociation footballer currently playing for FC Andijon in the Uzbek League. Karimov has also represented Uzbekistan at full senior level.

== Career ==
Karimov is a seasoned Uzbek League defender, having represented 4 clubs. In 2015, he scored his first Asian Champions League goal against Iranian club Tractor Sazi F.C. in a 2–1 win.

== International career ==
Karimov has represented Uzbekistan on 7 occasions, with his debut coming in 2007 in a friendly game against Ukraine which they lost 2–1.
