= Han Kyo-won =

South Korean footballer (born 1990)

Personal information
- Full name: Han Kyo-won
- Date of birth: 15 June 1990 (age 36)
- Place of birth: Chungju, South Korea
- Height: 1.82 m (6 ft 0 in)
- Position: Winger

Team information
- Current team: Chungnam Asan
- Number: 7

Senior career*
Years	Team	Apps	(Gls)
2011–2013	Incheon United	91	(15)
2014–2024	Jeonbuk Hyundai Motors	238	(53)
2017	→ Hwaseong FC (draft)	10	(2)
2024	→ Suwon FC (loan)	10	(0)
2025–	Chungnam Asan	45	(8)

International career
2014–2018	South Korea	9	(1)
Medal record
Men's football
Representing South Korea
AFC Asian Cup
Runner-up	2015 Australia
- * Club domestic league appearances and goals as of 6 August 2026

Han Kyo-won (Korean: 한교원; Hanja: 韓敎元; born 15 June 1990) is a South Korean association football forward, who plays for Chungnam Asan. He was also a South Korean representative in the sport.

== Club career ==
Han joined Incheon United for the 2011 K-League season. His first game for Incheon was as a late substitute in the loss to Gyeongnam FC in the fourth week of the league. Three days later, Han was a starter in the 2011 K-League Cup group game against Daegu, which finished in a goalless draw. Increasingly being included in the starting lineup for Incheon despite his relative youth, Han scored his first goal in the opening minutes of the match against Jeonbuk Hyundai Motors, which ultimately ended up in a 6 - 2 thrashing at the hands of the Jeonju based club.

== National career ==
Han represented South Korea at national level on a number of occasions, playing in 10 games from 2014 to 2015. He has scored one goal, in a friendly game against Jordan. He also played in the 2015 AFC Asian Cup.

== Career statistics ==
=== Club ===
As of match played 23 November 2024

Appearances and goals by club, season and competition
Team	Season	League			National Cup		League Cup		Continental		Other		Total	
Team	Season	Division	Apps	Goals	Apps	Goals	Apps	Goals	Apps	Goals	Apps	Goals	Apps	Goals
Incheon United	2011	K League 1	27	3	2	0	2	0	–		–		31	3
Incheon United	2012	K League 1	28	6	1	0	–		–		–		29	6
Incheon United	2013	K League 1	36	6	2	0	–		–		–		38	6
Incheon United	Total		91	15	5	0	2	0	–		–		98	15
Jeonbuk Hyundai Motors	2014	K League 1	32	11	2	1	–		8	1	–		42	13
Jeonbuk Hyundai Motors	2015	K League 1	26	1	0	0	–		7	1	–		33	2
Jeonbuk Hyundai Motors	2016	K League 1	19	4	2	0	–		8	2	1	0	30	6
Jeonbuk Hyundai Motors	2017	K League 1	12	1	1	0	–		–		–		13	1
Jeonbuk Hyundai Motors	2018	K League 1	23	7	1	0	–		6	1	–		30	8
Jeonbuk Hyundai Motors	2019	K League 1	14	0	0	0	–		4	1	–		18	1
Jeonbuk Hyundai Motors	2020	K League 1	24	11	3	1	–		5	1	–		32	13
Jeonbuk Hyundai Motors	2021	K League 1	22	6	2	0	–		8	1	–		32	7
Jeonbuk Hyundai Motors	2022	K League 1	23	7	4	2	–		9	2	–		36	7
Jeonbuk Hyundai Motors	2023	K League 1	28	5	3	0	–		4	1	–		35	6
Jeonbuk Hyundai Motors	2024	K League 1	15	0	1	0	–		3	0	–		19	0
Jeonbuk Hyundai Motors	Total		238	53	19	4	–		62	11	1	0	320	64
Hwaseong FC (draft)	2017	K3 League	10	2	1	0	–		–		–		11	2
Suwon FC (loan)	2024	K League 1	10	0	–		–		–		–		10	0
Career total			349	70	25	4	2	0	62	11	1	0	439	74

=== International ===
Scores and results list South Korea's goal tally first.

#	Date	Venue	Opponent	Score	Result	Competition
1.	14 November 2014	Amman International Stadium, Amman	Jordan	1–0	1–0	Friendly

== Honours ==
=== Club ===
Jeonbuk Hyundai Motors

- K League 1: 2014, 2015, 2017, 2018, 2019, 2020, 2021
- Korean FA Cup: 2020, 2022
- AFC Champions League: 2016

=== International ===
South Korea

- AFC Asian Cup runner-up: 2015

=== Individual ===
- K League Best XI: 2014, 2020
