= 2015 AFC Champions League =

34th edition of premier club football tournament organized by the AFC

Tournament details
- Dates: 4 February – 21 November 2015
- Teams: 49 (from 21 associations)

Final positions
- Champions: (China) Guangzhou Evergrande (2nd title)
- Runners-up: (United Arab Emirates) Al-Ahli

Tournament statistics
- Matches played: 126
- Goals scored: 334 (2.65 per match)
- Attendance: 2,123,583 (16,854 per match)
- Top scorer: Ricardo Goulart (8 goals)
- Best player: Ricardo Goulart

The 2015 AFC Champions League was the 34th edition of Asia's premier club football tournament organized by the Asian Football Confederation (AFC), and the 13th under the current AFC Champions League title.

Guangzhou Evergrande won the tournament after defeating Al-Ahli in the final. Guangzhou also qualified for the 2015 FIFA Club World Cup.

Western Sydney Wanderers were the defending champions, but they were eliminated in the group stage.

== Association team allocation ==
The AFC Competitions Committee proposed a revamp of the AFC club competitions on 25 January 2014, which was ratified by the AFC Executive Committee on 16 April 2014. The member associations are ranked based on their national team's and clubs' performance over the last four years in AFC competitions, with the allocation of slots for the 2015 and 2016 editions of the AFC club competitions determined by the 2014 rankings:

- The top 24 member associations (MAs) as per the AFC rankings are eligible to receive direct slots in the AFC Champions League, as long as they fulfill the AFC Champions League criteria.
- In both the East and West zones, there are a total of 12 direct slots in the group stage, with the 4 remaining slots filled through play-offs.
- The top six MAs in both the East and West zones get direct slots in the group stage, while the remaining MAs get play-off slots:
  - The first- and second-ranked MAs each get three direct slots and one play-off slot.
  - The third- and fourth-ranked MAs each get two direct slots and two play-off slots.
  - The fifth-ranked MAs each get one direct slot and two play-off slots.
  - The sixth-ranked MAs each get one direct slot and one play-off slot.
  - The seventh- to twelfth-ranked MAs each get one play-off slot.
- The maximum number of slots for each MA is one-third of the total number of clubs in the top division (e.g., Australia can only get a maximum of three total slots as there are only nine Australia-based clubs in the A-League).

The AFC Competitions Committee finalised the slot allocation for the 2015 and 2016 editions of the AFC Champions League based on the criteria, including AFC's MA rankings and the implementation of club licensing regulations, on 28 November 2014.

Participation for 2015 AFC Champions League
Fulfills participation criteria
Does not fulfill participation criteria

West Zone
Rank		Member Association	Points	Slots		
Rank		Member Association	Points	Group stage	Play-off	
Zone	All	Member Association	Points	Group stage	Play-off round	Prelim. round 2
1	2	(Saudi Arabia) Saudi Arabia	88.268	3	1	0
2	3	Iran	80.794	3	1	0
3	5	Uzbekistan	62.272	3	1	0
4	7	(United Arab Emirates) United Arab Emirates	57.792	2	2	0
5	9	Qatar	56.103	1	0	2
6	10	Iraq	47.106	0	0	0
7	11	Kuwait	45.423	0	0	1
8	12	Jordan	44.309	0	0	1
9	14	Oman	30.586	0	0	1
10	16	Bahrain	25.547	0	0	1
11	17	Lebanon	25.043	0	0	0
12	19	Syria	22.883	0	0	0
Total				12	5	6
Total				12	11	

East Zone
Rank		Member Association	Points	Slots			
Rank		Member Association	Points	Group stage	Play-off		
Zone	All	Member Association	Points	Group stage	Play-off round	Prelim. round 2	Prelim. round 1
1	1	(South Korea) South Korea	94.866	3	1	0	0
2	4	Japan	77.107	3	1	0	0
3	6	Australia	57.940	2	1	0	0
4	8	China	57.660	2	1	1	0
5	13	Thailand	33.049	1	0	2	0
6	15	Vietnam	27.753	1	0	1	0
7	18	Indonesia	25.004	0	0	1	0
8	20	(Hong Kong) Hong Kong	20.077	0	0	1	0
9	21	Myanmar	18.949	0	0	0	1
10	22	Malaysia	18.153	0	0	0	1
11	23	India	16.756	0	0	0	1
12	24	Singapore	16.097	0	0	0	1
Total				12	4	6	4
Total				12	14		

Notes

1. Iraq (2 play-off slots), Lebanon and Syria (1 play-off slot each) were allocated slots for the 2015 and 2016 AFC Champions League, but were not allowed to participate in the 2015 AFC Champions League as none of their teams passed the club licensing requirements for 2015.

== Teams ==
The following 49 teams from 21 associations entered the competition.

In the following table, the number of appearances and last appearance count only those since the 2002–03 season (including qualifying rounds), when the competition was rebranded as the AFC Champions League. TH means title holders.

West Zone
Team	Qualifying method	App	Last App
Group stage direct entrants (Groups A–D)
(Saudi Arabia) Al-Nassr	2013–14 Saudi Professional League champions	2nd	2011
(Saudi Arabia) Al-Shabab	2014 King Cup of Champions winners	9th	2014
(Saudi Arabia) Al-Hilal	2013–14 Saudi Professional League runners-up	11th	2014
(Iran) Foolad	2013–14 Iran Pro League champions	3rd	2014
(Iran) Tractor	2013–14 Hazfi Cup winners	3rd	2014
(Iran) Pirozi	2013–14 Iran Pro League runners-up	5th	2012
(Uzbekistan) Pakhtakor	2014 Uzbek League champions	12th	2013
(Uzbekistan) Lokomotiv Tashkent	2014 Uzbekistan Cup winners 2014 Uzbek League runners-up	3rd	2014
(Uzbekistan) Nasaf Qarshi	2014 Uzbek League 3rd place	3rd	2014
(United Arab Emirates) Al-Ahli	2013–14 Arabian Gulf League champions	6th	2014
(United Arab Emirates) Al-Ain	2013–14 UAE President's Cup winners	10th	2014
(Qatar) Lekhwiya	2013–14 Qatar Stars League champions	4th	2014
Qualifying play-off participants
Entering in play-off round
(Saudi Arabia) Al-Ahli	2013–14 Saudi Professional League 3rd place	7th	2013
(Iran) Naft Tehran	2013–14 Iran Pro League 3rd place	1st	none
(Uzbekistan) Bunyodkor	2014 Uzbek League 4th place	8th	2014
(United Arab Emirates) Al-Wahda	2013–14 Arabian Gulf League runners-up	7th	2011
(United Arab Emirates) Al-Jazira	2013–14 Arabian Gulf League 3rd place	7th	2014
Entering in preliminary round 2
(Qatar) Al-Sadd	2014 Emir of Qatar Cup winners	10th	2014
(Qatar) El Jaish	2013–14 Qatar Stars League runners-up	3rd	2014
(Kuwait) Al-Qadsia	2013–14 Kuwaiti Premier League champions	5th	2014
(Jordan) Al-Wehdat	2013–14 Jordan League champions	2nd	2002–03
(Oman) Al-Nahda	2013–14 Oman Professional League champions	1st	none
(Bahrain) Riffa	2013–14 Bahrain First Division League champions	3rd	2004

East Zone
Team	Qualifying method	App	Last App
Group stage direct entrants (Groups E–H)
(South Korea) Jeonbuk Hyundai Motors	2014 K League Classic champions	9th	2014
(South Korea) Seongnam FC	2014 Korean FA Cup winners	6th	2012
(South Korea) Suwon Samsung Bluewings	2014 K League Classic runners-up	6th	2013
(Japan) Gamba Osaka	2014 J.League Division 1 champions and 2014 Emperor's Cup winners	7th	2012
(Japan) Urawa Red Diamonds	2014 J.League Division 1 runners-up	4th	2013
(Japan) Kashima Antlers	2014 J.League Division 1 3rd place	6th	2011
(Australia) Brisbane Roar	2013–14 A-League and 2014 A-League Grand Final winners	3rd	2013
(Australia) Western Sydney Wanderers^{TH}	2013–14 A-League regular season runners-up	2nd	2014
(China) Guangzhou Evergrande	2014 Chinese Super League champions	4th	2014
(China) Shandong Luneng Taishan	2014 Chinese FA Cup winners	7th	2014
(Thailand) Buriram United	2014 Thai Premier League champions	5th	2014
(Vietnam) Becamex Bình Dương	2014 V.League 1 champions	2nd	2008
Qualifying play-off participants
Entering in play-off round
(South Korea) FC Seoul	2014 K League Classic 3rd place	5th	2014
(Japan) Kashiwa Reysol	2014 J.League Division 1 4th place	3rd	2013
(Australia) Central Coast Mariners	2013–14 A-League regular season 3rd place	5th	2014
(China) Beijing Guoan	2014 Chinese Super League runners-up	7th	2014
Entering in preliminary round 2
(China) Guangzhou R&F	2014 Chinese Super League 3rd place	1st	none
(Thailand) Bangkok Glass	2014 Thai FA Cup winners	1st	none
(Thailand) Chonburi	2014 Thai Premier League runners-up	4th	2014
(Vietnam) Hà Nội T&T	2014 V.League 1 runners-up	2nd	2014
(Indonesia) Persib Bandung	2014 Indonesia Super League champions	1st	none
(Hong Kong) Kitchee	2013–14 Hong Kong First Division League champions	1st	none
Entering in preliminary round 1
(Myanmar) Yadanarbon	2014 Myanmar National League champions	1st	none
(Malaysia) Johor Darul Ta'zim	2014 Malaysia Super League champions	1st	none
(India) Bengaluru FC	2013–14 I-League champions	1st	none
(Singapore) Warriors	2014 S.League champions	3rd	2010

Notes

1. Vietnam (VIE): Hà Nội T&T entered the AFC Champions League instead of Hải Phòng, the 2014 Vietnamese Cup winners, as Hải Phòng did not pass the club licensing requirements.
Location of teams of the 2015 AFC Champions League.
West Zone
East Zone
(p) Qualifying play-off participants

== Schedule ==
The schedule of the competition was as follows (all draws were held in Kuala Lumpur, Malaysia).

Stage	Round	Draw date	First leg	Second leg
Preliminary stage	Preliminary round 1	No draw	4 February 2015	
Preliminary stage	Preliminary round 2	No draw	10 February 2015	
Play-off stage	Play-off round	No draw	17 February 2015	
Group stage	Matchday 1	11 December 2014	24–25 February 2015	
Group stage	Matchday 2	11 December 2014	3–4 March 2015	
Group stage	Matchday 3	11 December 2014	17–18 March 2015	
Group stage	Matchday 4	11 December 2014	7–8 April 2015	
Group stage	Matchday 5	11 December 2014	21–22 April 2015	
Group stage	Matchday 6	11 December 2014	5–6 May 2015	
Knockout stage	Round of 16	11 December 2014	19–20 May 2015	26–27 May 2015
Knockout stage	Quarter-finals	18 June 2015	25–26 August 2015	15–16 September 2015
Knockout stage	Semi-finals	18 June 2015	29–30 September 2015	20–21 October 2015
Knockout stage	Final	18 June 2015	7 November 2015	21 November 2015

== Qualifying play-off ==
The bracket for the qualifying play-off, which consisted of three rounds (preliminary round 1, preliminary round 2, and play-off round), was determined by the AFC based on the association ranking of each team. Each tie was played as a single match, with the team from the higher-ranked association hosting the match. Extra time and penalty shoot-out were used to decide the winner if necessary. The winners of each tie in the play-off round advanced to the group stage to join the 24 automatic qualifiers. All losers in each round which were from associations with only play-off slots entered the 2015 AFC Cup group stage.

=== Preliminary round 1 ===
East Zone
Team 1	Score	Team 2
Yadanarbon (Myanmar)	1–1 (a.e.t.) (5–6 p)	(Singapore) Warriors
Johor Darul Ta'zim (Malaysia)	2–1 (a.e.t.)	(India) Bengaluru FC

=== Preliminary round 2 ===
West Zone
Team 1	Score	Team 2
Al-Qadsia (Kuwait)	1–0	(Jordan) Al-Wehdat
El Jaish (Qatar)	2–1	(Oman) Al-Nahda
Al-Sadd (Qatar)	0–0 (a.e.t.) (11–10 p)	(Bahrain) Riffa

East Zone
Team 1	Score	Team 2
Hà Nội T&T (Vietnam)	4–0	(Indonesia) Persib Bandung
Chonburi (Thailand)	4–1	(Hong Kong) Kitchee
Guangzhou R&F (China)	3–0	(Singapore) Warriors
Bangkok Glass (Thailand)	3–0	(Malaysia) Johor Darul Ta'zim

=== Play-off round ===
West Zone
Team 1	Score	Team 2
Al-Ahli (Saudi Arabia)	2–1 (a.e.t.)	(Kuwait) Al-Qadsia
Naft Tehran (Iran)	1–0	(Qatar) El Jaish
Bunyodkor (Uzbekistan)	2–1	(United Arab Emirates) Al-Jazira
Al-Wahda (United Arab Emirates)	4–4 (a.e.t.) (4–5 p)	(Qatar) Al-Sadd

East Zone
Team 1	Score	Team 2
FC Seoul (South Korea)	7–0	(Vietnam) Hà Nội T&T
Kashiwa Reysol (Japan)	3–2 (a.e.t.)	(Thailand) Chonburi
Central Coast Mariners (Australia)	1–3	(China) Guangzhou R&F
Beijing Guoan (China)	3–0	(Thailand) Bangkok Glass

== Group stage ==
The draw for the group stage was held on 11 December 2014. The 32 teams were drawn into eight groups of four. Teams from the same association could not be drawn into the same group. Each group was played on a home-and-away round-robin basis. The winners and runners-up of each group advanced to the round of 16.

Tiebreakers

The teams are ranked according to points (3 points for a win, 1 point for a draw, 0 points for a loss). If tied on points, tiebreakers are applied in the following order:

1. Greater number of points obtained in the group matches between the teams concerned;
2. Goal difference resulting from the group matches between the teams concerned;
3. Greater number of goals scored in the group matches between the teams concerned;
4. Greater number of away goals scored in the group matches between the teams concerned;
5. If, after applying criteria 1 to 4, teams still have an equal ranking, criteria 1 to 4 are reapplied exclusively to the matches between the teams in question to determine their final rankings. If this procedure does not lead to a decision, criteria 6 to 10 apply;
6. Goal difference in all the group matches;
7. Greater number of goals scored in all the group matches;
8. Penalty shoot-out if only two teams are involved and they are both on the field of play;
9. Fewer score calculated according to the number of yellow and red cards received in the group matches (1 point for a single yellow card, 3 points for a red card as a consequence of two yellow cards, 3 points for a direct red card, 4 points for a yellow card followed by a direct red card);
10. Team who belongs to the member association with the higher AFC ranking.

=== Group A ===
Pos	Team	Pld	W	D	L	GF	GA	GD	Pts	Qualification	LEK	PER	NSR	BYD
1	(Qatar) Lekhwiya	6	4	1	1	9	5	+4	13	Advance to knockout stage	—	3–0	1–1	1–0
2	(Iran) Persepolis	6	4	0	2	7	7	0	12	Advance to knockout stage	3–0	—	1–0	2–1
3	(Saudi Arabia) Al-Nassr	6	2	2	2	7	6	+1	8		1–3	3–0	—	1–1
4	(Uzbekistan) Bunyodkor	6	0	1	5	2	7	−5	1		0–1	0–1	0–1	—

Source: AFC

=== Group B ===
Pos	Team	Pld	W	D	L	GF	GA	GD	Pts	Qualification	AIN	NAF	PAK	SHB
1	(United Arab Emirates) Al-Ain	6	3	3	0	7	2	+5	12	Advance to knockout stage	—	3–0	1–1	0–0
2	(Iran) Naft Tehran	6	2	2	2	8	8	0	8	Advance to knockout stage	1–1	—	1–1	2–1
3	(Uzbekistan) Pakhtakor	6	1	3	2	6	8	−2	6		0–1	2–1	—	0–2
4	(Saudi Arabia) Al-Shabab	6	1	2	3	5	8	−3	5		0–1	0–3	2–2	—

Source: AFC

=== Group C ===
Pos	Team	Pld	W	D	L	GF	GA	GD	Pts	Qualification	HIL	SAD	FOO	LOK
1	(Saudi Arabia) Al-Hilal	6	4	1	1	9	4	+5	13	Advance to knockout stage	—	2–1	2–0	3–1
2	(Qatar) Al-Sadd	6	3	1	2	9	9	0	10	Advance to knockout stage	1–0	—	1–0	6–2
3	(Iran) Foolad	6	1	3	2	2	4	−2	6		0–0	0–0	—	1–0
4	(Uzbekistan) Lokomotiv Tashkent	6	1	1	4	10	13	−3	4		1–2	5–0	1–1	—

Source: AFC

=== Group D ===
Pos	Team	Pld	W	D	L	GF	GA	GD	Pts	Qualification	AHS	AHU	NSF	TRA
1	(Saudi Arabia) Al-Ahli	6	3	3	0	11	7	+4	12	Advance to knockout stage	—	2–1	2–1	2–0
2	(United Arab Emirates) Al-Ahli	6	2	2	2	8	8	0	8	Advance to knockout stage	3–3	—	0–0	3–2
3	(Uzbekistan) Nasaf Qarshi	6	2	2	2	5	5	0	8		0–0	0–1	—	2–1
4	(Iran) Tractor Sazi	6	1	1	4	7	11	−4	4		2–2	1–0	1–2	—

Source: AFC

=== Group E ===
Pos	Team	Pld	W	D	L	GF	GA	GD	Pts	Qualification	KSW	JHM	SLT	BBD
1	(Japan) Kashiwa Reysol	6	3	2	1	14	9	+5	11	Advance to knockout stage	—	3–2	2–1	5–1
2	(South Korea) Jeonbuk Hyundai Motors	6	3	2	1	14	6	+8	11	Advance to knockout stage	0–0	—	4–1	3–0
3	(China) Shandong Luneng Taishan	6	2	1	3	13	17	−4	7		4–4	1–4	—	3–1
4	(Vietnam) Becamex Bình Dương	6	1	1	4	6	15	−9	4		1–0	1–1	2–3	—

Source: AFC

=== Group F ===
Pos	Team	Pld	W	D	L	GF	GA	GD	Pts	Qualification	GAM	SNM	BUR	GRF
1	(Japan) Gamba Osaka	6	3	1	2	10	7	+3	10	Advance to knockout stage	—	2–1	1–1	0–2
2	(South Korea) Seongnam FC	6	3	1	2	7	5	+2	10	Advance to knockout stage	2–0	—	2–1	0–0
3	(Thailand) Buriram United	6	3	1	2	12	7	+5	10		1–2	2–1	—	5–0
4	(China) Guangzhou R&F	6	1	1	4	3	13	−10	4		0–5	0–1	1–2	—

Source: AFC

=== Group G ===
Pos	Team	Pld	W	D	L	GF	GA	GD	Pts	Qualification	BJG	SSB	BRI	URA
1	(China) Beijing Guoan	6	3	2	1	6	3	+3	11	Advance to knockout stage	—	1–0	0–1	2–0
2	(South Korea) Suwon Samsung Bluewings	6	3	2	1	11	8	+3	11	Advance to knockout stage	1–1	—	3–1	2–1
3	(Australia) Brisbane Roar	6	2	1	3	7	9	−2	7		0–1	3–3	—	1–2
4	(Japan) Urawa Red Diamonds	6	1	1	4	5	9	−4	4		1–1	1–2	0–1	—

Source: AFC

=== Group H ===
Pos	Team	Pld	W	D	L	GF	GA	GD	Pts	Qualification	GET	SEO	WSW	KSM
1	(China) Guangzhou Evergrande	6	3	1	2	9	9	0	10	Advance to knockout stage	—	1–0	0–2	4–3
2	(South Korea) FC Seoul	6	2	3	1	5	4	+1	9	Advance to knockout stage	0–0	—	0–0	1–0
3	(Australia) Western Sydney Wanderers	6	2	2	2	9	7	+2	8		2–3	1–1	—	1–2
4	(Japan) Kashima Antlers	6	2	0	4	10	13	−3	6		2–1	2–3	1–3	—

Source: AFC

== Knockout stage ==
In the knockout stage, the 16 teams played a single-elimination tournament, with the teams split between the two zones until the final. Each tie was played on a home-and-away two-legged basis. The away goals rule, extra time (away goals do not apply in extra time) and penalty shoot-out were used to decide the winner if necessary.

=== Bracket ===
Round of 16
(Iran) Persepolis	1	0	1
(Saudi Arabia) Al-Hilal	0	3	3
(Qatar) Al-Sadd	1	2	3
(Qatar) Lekhwiya	2	2	4
(Iran) Naft Tehran (a)	1	1	2
(Saudi Arabia) Al-Ahli	0	2	2
(United Arab Emirates) Al-Ahli (a)	0	3	3
(United Arab Emirates) Al-Ain	0	3	3
(South Korea) Suwon Bluewings	2	2	4
(Japan) Kashiwa Reysol (a)	3	1	4
(South Korea) Seongnam FC	2	0	2
(China) Guangzhou Evergrande	1	2	3
(South Korea) Jeonbuk Motors	1	1	2
(China) Beijing Guoan	1	0	1
(South Korea) FC Seoul	1	2	3
(Japan) Gamba Osaka	3	3	6

Quarter-finals
(Saudi Arabia) Al-Hilal	4	2	6
(Qatar) Lekhwiya	1	2	3
(Iran) Naft Tehran	0	1	1
(United Arab Emirates) Al-Ahli	1	2	3
(Japan) Kashiwa Reysol	1	1	2
(China) Guangzhou Evergrande	3	1	4
(South Korea) Jeonbuk Motors	0	2	2
(Japan) Gamba Osaka	0	3	3

Semi-finals
(Saudi Arabia) Al-Hilal	1	2	3
(United Arab Emirates) Al-Ahli	1	3	4
(China) Guangzhou Evergrande	2	0	2
(Japan) Gamba Osaka	1	0	1

Final
(United Arab Emirates) Al-Ahli	0	0	0
(China) Guangzhou Evergrande	0	1	1

=== Round of 16 ===
In the round of 16, the winners of one group played the runners-up of another group in the same zone, with the group winners hosting the second leg.

West Zone
Team 1	Agg.	Team 2	1st leg	2nd leg
Al-Sadd (Qatar)	3–4	(Qatar) Lekhwiya	1–2	2–2
Persepolis (Iran)	1–3	(Saudi Arabia) Al-Hilal	1–0	0–3
Al-Ahli (United Arab Emirates)	3–3 (a)	(United Arab Emirates) Al-Ain	0–0	3–3
Naft Tehran (Iran)	2–2 (a)	(Saudi Arabia) Al-Ahli	1–0	1–2

East Zone
Team 1	Agg.	Team 2	1st leg	2nd leg
Suwon Samsung Bluewings (South Korea)	4–4 (a)	(Japan) Kashiwa Reysol	2–3	2–1
Jeonbuk Hyundai Motors (South Korea)	2–1	(China) Beijing Guoan	1–1	1–0
FC Seoul (South Korea)	3–6	(Japan) Gamba Osaka	1–3	2–3
Seongnam FC (South Korea)	2–3	(China) Guangzhou Evergrande	2–1	0–2

=== Quarter-finals ===
The draw for the quarter-finals was held on 18 June 2015. Teams from different zones could not be drawn into the same tie, and there was no seeding or country protection, so teams from the same association could be drawn into the same tie.

West Zone
Team 1	Agg.	Team 2	1st leg	2nd leg
Al-Hilal (Saudi Arabia)	6–3	(Qatar) Lekhwiya	4–1	2–2
Naft Tehran (Iran)	1–3	(United Arab Emirates) Al-Ahli	0–1	1–2

East Zone
Team 1	Agg.	Team 2	1st leg	2nd leg
Kashiwa Reysol (Japan)	2–4	(China) Guangzhou Evergrande	1–3	1–1
Jeonbuk Hyundai Motors (South Korea)	2–3	(Japan) Gamba Osaka	0–0	2–3

=== Semi-finals ===
In the semi-finals, the matchups were determined by the quarter-final draw.

West Zone
Team 1	Agg.	Team 2	1st leg	2nd leg
Al-Hilal (Saudi Arabia)	3–4	(United Arab Emirates) Al-Ahli	1–1	2–3

East Zone
Team 1	Agg.	Team 2	1st leg	2nd leg
Guangzhou Evergrande (China)	2–1	(Japan) Gamba Osaka	2–1	0–0

=== Final ===
In the final, the finalist from the West Zone hosted the first leg, while the finalist from the East Zone hosted the second leg (no draw was held to determine the order of legs, as it was reversed from the previous season's final).

7 November 2015
19:45 UTC+4

Al-Ahli (United Arab Emirates)	0–0	(China) Guangzhou Evergrande
	Report

Al-Rashid Stadium, Dubai
Attendance: 9,480
Referee: Kim Jong-hyeok (South Korea)
21 November 2015
20:00 UTC+8

Guangzhou Evergrande (China)	1–0	(United Arab Emirates) Al-Ahli
Elkeson 54'	Report

Tianhe Stadium, Guangzhou
Attendance: 42,499
Referee: Ravshan Irmatov (Uzbekistan)

Guangzhou Evergrande won 1–0 on aggregate.

== Awards ==
Award	Player	Team
Most Valuable Player	(Brazil) Ricardo Goulart	(China) Guangzhou Evergrande
Top Goalscorer	(Brazil) Ricardo Goulart	(China) Guangzhou Evergrande
Fair Play Award	—	(China) Guangzhou Evergrande

=== Dream team ===
The AFC selected the following 11 players as 2015 AFC Champions League dream team.

Pos.	Player	Team
GK	(Japan) Masaaki Higashiguchi	(Japan) Gamba Osaka
DF	(China) Zhang Linpeng	(China) Guangzhou Evergrande
DF	(South Korea) Kwon Kyung-won	(United Arab Emirates) Al-Ahli
DF	(South Korea) Kim Young-gwon	(China) Guangzhou Evergrande
DF	(Saudi Arabia) Yasser Al-Shahrani	(Saudi Arabia) Al-Hilal
MF	(China) Huang Bowen	(China) Guangzhou Evergrande
MF	(China) Zheng Zhi	(China) Guangzhou Evergrande
MF	(United Arab Emirates) Majed Hassan	(United Arab Emirates) Al-Ahli
FW	(United Arab Emirates) Ahmed Khalil	(United Arab Emirates) Al-Ahli
FW	(Brazil) Elkeson	(China) Guangzhou Evergrande
FW	(Brazil) Ricardo Goulart	(China) Guangzhou Evergrande

== Top scorers ==
Rank	Player	Team	MD1	MD2	MD3	MD4	MD5	MD6	2R1	2R2	QF1	QF2	SF1	SF2	F1	F2	Total
1	(Brazil) Ricardo Goulart	(China) Guangzhou Evergrande	1	3	2					2							8
2	(China) Yang Xu	(China) Shandong Luneng Taishan	2	1		1	2										6
2	(United Arab Emirates) Ahmed Khalil	(United Arab Emirates) Al-Ahli	1					2		2		1					6
4	(Tunisia) Youssef Msakni	(Qatar) Lekhwiya					1	1	1	1	1						5
4	(Ba'athist Syria) Omar Al Soma	(Saudi Arabia) Al-Ahli		1		2				2							5
4	(Ghana) Asamoah Gyan	(United Arab Emirates) Al-Ain		1			1	1		2							5
7	(Brazil) Patric	(Japan) Gamba Osaka					2			1		1					4
7	(Japan) Takashi Usami	(Japan) Gamba Osaka					1	1	2								4
7	(Japan) Masato Kudo	(Japan) Kashiwa Reysol		2		1					1						4
7	(South Korea) Lee Dong-gook	(South Korea) Jeonbuk Hyundai Motors			2		2										4
7	(Brazil) Carlos Eduardo	(Saudi Arabia) Al-Hilal									2	1		1			4
7	(Brazil) Diogo	(Thailand) Buriram United					1	3									4
7	(Brazil) Lima	(United Arab Emirates) Al-Ahli									1	1	1	1			4
7	(Brazil) Everton Ribeiro	(United Arab Emirates) Al-Ahli				1	1	1						1			4

Note: Goals scored in qualifying play-off not counted when determining top scorer (see regulations, Article 77.4).

Source: the-AFC.com

== See also ==
- 2015 AFC Cup
- 2015 FIFA Club World Cup
