= Kwon Young-jin (footballer) =

South Korean footballer

Personal information
- Date of birth: January 23, 1991 (age 35)
- Place of birth: South Korea
- Height: 1.76 m (5 ft 9 in)
- Position: Midfielder

Team information
- Current team: PSMS Medan

Youth career
- 2006–2008: Jinju High School
- 2009–2012: Sungkyunkwan University

Senior career*
Years	Team	Apps	(Gls)
2013–2016	Jeonbuk Hyundai Motors	3	(0)
2015	→Gangneung City	14	(0)
2017	Mito HollyHock	10	(0)
2018–	PSMS Medan	0	(0)
- * Club domestic league appearances and goals

Kwon Young-jin (Korean: 권영진; born January 23, 1991) is a South Korean football player who plays as a midfielder for Liga 1 club PSMS Medan.
