= Mohanad Qasim Sarray =

Iraqi professional football referee (born 1980)

Mohanad Qasim Eesee Sarray مهند قاسم
- Born: 22 May 1980 (age 46)

Domestic
Years	League	Role

International
Years	League	Role
2011–	FIFA listed	Referee

Mohanad Qasim Eessee Sarray (Arabic: مهند قاسم; born 1980) is an Iraqi professional football referee. He has been a full international for FIFA since 2010. He refereed some matches in AFC Champions League.

== AFC Asian Cup ==
2019 AFC Asian Cup – United Arab Emirates
Date	Match	Venue	Round
15 January 2019	Palestine – Jordan	Abu Dhabi	Group stage
