= Kim Sang-woo (referee) =

South Korean football referee

Kim Sang-Woo 김상우
- Born: 4 August 1975 (age 51); South Korea

International
Years	League	Role
2008–2017	FIFA listed	Referee

Kim Sang-Woo (born 4 August 1975) is a South Korean football referee. He has refereed internationally in the ASEAN Football Championship, Kor Royal Cup and FIFA World Cup qualifiers. He is also a referee at the K-League.
