= Kim Dong-jin (referee) =

South Korean football referee

- Full name: Kim Dong-jin
- Born: 9 June 1973 (age 53); South Korea

International
Years	League	Role
2005-	FIFA	Referee

- Kim Dong-jin
- Hangul: 김동진
- Hanja: 金東真
- RR: Gim Dongjin
- MR: Kim Tongjin

Kim Dong-jin (Korean: 김동진; born 9 June 1973) is a South Korean football referee. He is listed in FIFA's international referee from 2005.

Kim has served as a referee for competitions including the 2011 FIFA U-20 World Cup and qualifying for the 2010 and 2014 World Cups.

Preceded by (Saudi Arabia) Khalil Al Ghamdi	AFC Cup final match referees 2011 (South Korea) Kim Dong-jin	Succeeded by (Uzbekistan) Valentin Kovalenko
Preceded by (Singapore) Abdul Malik Abdul Bashir	AFC Cup final match referees 2014 (South Korea) Kim Dong-jin	Succeeded by (Japan) Minoru Tōjō
