= Minoru Tōjō =

Japanese association football referee (born 1976)

- Full name: Minoru Tōjō
- Born: August 30, 1976 (age 50); Tokorozawa, Saitama, Japan

Domestic
| Years | League | Role |
| 2008–present | J-League | Referee |
| 2008–present | J. League Division 2 | Referee |

International
| Years | League | Role |
| 2007–present | FIFA | Referee |

Minoru Tōjō (東城 穣, Tōjō Minoru; born August 30, 1976) is a Japanese association football referee who currently officiates in the J-League, and Div. 2. Since 2007 he has been an international referee.

== Career ==
Since becoming a professional referee in 2008, Minoru has been refereeing in the J-League and Div. 2. He has also officiated the 2008 AFC President's Cup group stage game between Dordoi-Dynamo Naryn and Nagacorp FC. He has refereed in the 2008 AFC Cup, officiating 3 matches. He has also covered in the 2009 AFC Champions League officiating 3 games, likewise in the 2010 AFC Champions League. He also, as a guest referee, officiated the final game of the Polish Ekstraklasa between Legia Warsaw and Lech Poznan.

International matches

To date, Minoru has officiated four full internationals, as well as being a referee in the 2008 AFC U-16 Championship. He has also refereed three friendlies, and a 2011 Asian Cup qualification game.

He refereed the FIFA World Cup 2014 third round qualifier match between Singapore and Iraq on 6 September 2011, making a controversial decision where he denied Singapore a blatant penalty.

He was the referee for the Southeast Asian Games final match between Malaysia and Indonesia on 21 November 2011 and was widely praised for his calm refereeing of the match between the two great rivals.

| Date | Home | Away | Result | Competition |
|---|---|---|---|---|
| August 4, 2008 | Syria U16s | Indonesia U16s | 2 – 1 | 2008 AFC U-16 Championship |
| August 6, 2008 | Uzbekistan U16s | Iran U16s | 1 – 2 | 2008 AFC U-16 Championship |
| August 8, 2008 | Syria U16s | South Korea U16s | 1 – 1 | 2008 AFC U-16 Championship |
| August 12, 2008 | Australia U16s | (United Arab Emirates) UAE U16s | 2 – 3 | 2008 AFC U-16 Championship |
| May 29, 2009 | Belgium | Chile | 1 – 1 | Kirin Cup |
| October 10, 2009 | Australia | Netherlands | 0 – 0 | Friendly Match |
| November 18, 2009 | Indonesia | Kuwait | 1 – 1 | 2011 AFC Asian Cup qualification |
| June 5, 2011 | Australia | New Zealand | 3 – 0 | Friendly Match |
| June 7, 2011 | Australia | Serbia | 0 – 0 | Friendly Match |
| September 6, 2011 | Singapore | Iraq | 0 – 2 | 2014 FIFA World Cup qualification (AFC) |
| November 21, 2011 | Indonesia | Malaysia | 1 – 1 (a.e.t.); 3 – 4 (Penalties) | 2011 Southeast Asian Games Football Tournament Final |
| December 9, 2012 | Iran | Saudi Arabia | 0 – 0 | 2012 WAFF Championship |
| December 14, 2012 | Oman | Palestine | 2 – 1 | 2012 WAFF Championship |
| February 6, 2013 | Iraq | Indonesia | 1 – 0 | 2015 AFC Asian Cup qualification |

== See also ==
- List of football referees

| Preceded by (South Korea) Kim Dong Jin | AFC Cup final match referees 2015 (Japan) Minoru Tōjō | Succeeded by (South Korea) Kim Jong-hyeok |
