= Kim Jong-hyeok =

South Korean football referee

- Born: 31 March 1983 (age 43); South Korea

Domestic
Years	League	
2009–2016	K League Classic	
2016-2021	AFC Cup	
2021	UEFA Champions League	

International
Years	League	Role
2009–2021	FIFA	Referee

- Kim Jong-hyeok
- Hangul: 김종혁
- Hanja: 金鐘赫
- RR: Gim Jonghyeok
- MR: Kim Chonghyŏk

Kim Jong-hyeok (born 31 March 1983) is a South Korean football referee who has been a full international referee for FIFA.

Kim became a FIFA referee in 2009. He also refereed in the 2014 FIFA World Cup qualifiers, beginning with the opening-round match between Mongolia and Myanmar.

Preceded by (Japan) Minoru Tōjō	AFC Cup final match referees 2016 (South Korea) Kim Jong-hyeok	Succeeded by (United Arab Emirates) Mohammed Abdulla Hassan Mohamed
