= 2013 Kashiwa Reysol season =

Kashiwa Reysol
2013 season
- Chairman: Shigeyuki Onodera
- Manager: Nelsinho Baptista
- J.League: 10th
- Emperor's Cup: Fourth Round
- J.League Cup: Champions
- Champions League: Semifinal vs Guangzhou Evergrande
- Super Cup: Runners Up vs Sanfrecce Hiroshima
- Top goalscorer: League: Masato Kudo (19); All: Masato Kudo (27)
- Highest home attendance: 34,021 vs Urawa Red Diamonds; 26 May 2013
- Lowest home attendance: 6,083 vs Guizhou Renhe; 23 April 2013
- Average home league attendance: 11,510 16 July 2013
Home colours	Away colours

The 2013 Kashiwa Reysol season was Kashiwa Reysol's 3rd season back in the J.League Division 1 since promotion in 2010, making it their 41st season in the top flight overall. They finished 10th in the league, won the J.League Cup and were knocked out of the Emperor's Cup and AFC Champions League at the fourth round Semifinals respectively.

== Squad ==
As of January 31, 2013 Note: Flags indicate national team as defined under FIFA eligibility rules; some limited exceptions apply. Players may hold more than one non-FIFA nationality.

No.	Pos.	Nation	Player
1	GK	JPN	Kazushige Kirihata
2	DF	JPN	Masato Fujita
3	DF	JPN	Naoya Kondo
4	DF	JPN	Daisuke Suzuki
5	DF	JPN	Tatsuya Masushima
7	MF	JPN	Hidekazu Otani (captain)
8	FW	JPN	Masakatsu Sawa
9	FW	JPN	Masato Kudo
10	MF	BRA	Leandro Domingues
11	FW	BRA	Cléo (on loan from Guangzhou Evergrande)
14	DF	JPN	Kenta Kano
15	MF	BRA	Jorge Wagner
16	GK	JPN	Koji Inada
17	MF	JPN	Hiroki Akino

No.	Pos.	Nation	Player
18	MF	JPN	Junya Tanaka
19	FW	JPN	Yū Kimura
20	MF	JPN	Akimi Barada
21	GK	JPN	Takanori Sugeno
22	DF	JPN	Wataru Hashimoto
23	DF	JPN	Hirofumi Watanabe
25	MF	JPN	Yūsuke Kobayashi
26	MF	JPN	Tetsuro Ota
27	DF	KOR	Kim Chang-Soo
28	MF	JPN	Ryoichi Kurisawa
29	MF	JPN	Hiroyuki Taniguchi
30	FW	JPN	Ryosuke Yamanaka
31	GK	JPN	Kosuke Nakamura

=== Out on loan ===
Note: Flags indicate national team as defined under FIFA eligibility rules; some limited exceptions apply. Players may hold more than one non-FIFA nationality.

No.	Pos.	Nation	Player
—	GK	JPN	Goro Kawanami (to Tokushima Vortis)
—	DF	KOR	Kweon Han-Jin (to Shonan Bellmare)
—	MF	JPN	Kosuke Taketomi (to Shonan Bellmare)

No.	Pos.	Nation	Player
—	MF	JPN	Taishi Soma (to Machida Zelvia)
—	MF	JPN	Hiroto Nakagawa (to Shonan Bellmare)

== Transfers ==
=== Winter ===
In Note: Flags indicate national team as defined under FIFA eligibility rules; some limited exceptions apply. Players may hold more than one non-FIFA nationality.

No.	Pos.	Nation	Player
4	DF	JPN	Daisuke Suzuki (Transferred from Albirex Niigata)
11	FW	BRA	Cléo (loan from (China) Guangzhou Evergrande)
14	MF	JPN	Kenta Kano (Transferred from Yokohama F. Marinos)
17	MF	JPN	Hiroki Akino (Promoted from youth team)
19	FW	JPN	Yu Kimura (Promoted from youth team)
25	MF	JPN	Yusuke Kobayashi (Promoted from youth team)
26	MF	JPN	Tetsuro Ota (Transferred from Montedio Yamagata)
27	DF	KOR	Kim Chang-Soo (Transferred from (South Korea) Busan IPark)
29	MF	JPN	Hiroyuki Taniguchi (Transferred from Yokohama F. Marinos)
31	GK	JPN	Kosuke Nakamura (Promoted from youth team)
—	MF	JPN	Hiroto Nakagawa (Promoted from youth team)

Out Note: Flags indicate national team as defined under FIFA eligibility rules; some limited exceptions apply. Players may hold more than one non-FIFA nationality.

No.	Pos.	Nation	Player
6	DF	JPN	Daisuke Nasu (Transferred to Urawa Red Diamonds)
11	FW	BRA	Neto Baiano (Transferred to (Brazil) Goiás)
14	DF	KOR	Kweon Han-Jin (loan to Shonan Bellmare)
17	MF	PRK	Ahn Young-Hak (Released)
26	DF	JPN	Ryoji Fukui (Transferred to Tokyo Verdy)
29	MF	JPN	Koki Mizuno (Transferred to Ventforet Kofu)
31	GK	JPN	Goro Kawanami (loan to Tokushima Vortis)
—	GK	JPN	Yuya Miura (Released, previously on loan at Matsumoto Yamaga)
—	MF	JPN	Hiroto Nakagawa (loan to Shonan Bellmare)
—	MF	JPN	Taishi Soma (loan to F.C. Machida Zelvia, previously on loan at F.C. Ryukyu)
—	MF	JPN	Kosuke Taketomi (loan to Shonan Bellmare, previously on loan at Roasso Kumamoto)
—	FW	BRA	Efrain Rintaro (Transferred to FC Ryukyu, previously on loan at Blaublitz Akita)

== Competitions ==
=== Super Cup ===
23 February 2013	Sanfrecce Hiroshima	1–0	Kashiwa Reysol	Tokyo
13:35 JST (UTC+9)	Satō 29'	Summary		Stadium: National Olympic Stadium; Attendance: 34,972; Referee: Minoru Tōjō

=== J.League ===
==== Results summary ====
Overall								Home						Away					
Pld	W	D	L	GF	GA	GD	Pts	W	D	L	GF	GA	GD	W	D	L	GF	GA	GD
34	13	9	12	56	56	0	48	8	5	4	34	28	+6	5	4	8	22	28	−6

Last updated: 9 December 2013.
Source: [ World-Football.net]

==== Results by round ====
Round	1	2	3	4	5	6	7	8	9	10	11	12	13	14	15	16	17	18	19	20	21	22	23	24	25	26	27	28	29	30	31	32	33	34
Ground	H	A	A	H	H	A	A	H	H	A	H	H	A	A	A	H	H	A	H	A	H	A	H	A	H	A	H	A	H	A	H	A	H	A
Result	W	L	L	W	D	L	W	L	W	W	L	L	D	L	W	W	D	D	W	D	D	W	W	L	L	D	D	L	W	L	D	L	W	W
Position	2	8	11	9	8	11	8	11	9	8	10	11	11	12	10	9	9	10	10	11	11	7	7	9	10	10	10	11	9	11	11	12	12	9

Updated to match(es) played on 9 December 2013. Source: See below
A = Away; H = Home; W = Win; D = Draw; L = Loss

==== Results ====
3 March 2013 Round 1	Kashiwa Reysol	3–1	Kawasaki Frontale	Kashiwa
13:00 JST (UTC+9)	Cléo 4', 63'; Kudo 72'	Report	Renatinho 79'	Stadium: Hitachi Kashiwa Soccer Stadium; Attendance: 13,785; Referee: Yuichi Nishimura

9 March 2013 Round 2	FC Tokyo	3–0	Kashiwa Reysol	Chōfu
14:00 JST (UTC+9)	Watanabe 9', 29'; Hasegawa 78'	Report		Stadium: Ajinomoto Stadium; Attendance: 26,256; Referee: Toshimitsu Yoshida

16 March 2013 Round 3	Vegalta Sendai	2–1	Kashiwa Reysol	Izumi-ku
14:00 JST (UTC+9)	Matsushita 8'; Wilson 86'	Report	Domingues 52'	Stadium: Yurtec Stadium Sendai; Attendance: 13,232; Referee: Nobutsugu Murakami

30 March 2013 Round 4	Kashiwa Reysol	3–1	Oita Trinita	Kashiwa
15:00 JST (UTC+9)	Kudo 38', 90+3'; Tanaka 63'	Report	Matsumoto 53'	Stadium: Hitachi Kashiwa Soccer Stadium; Attendance: 9,144; Referee: Koichiro Fukushima

6 April 2013 Round 5	Kashiwa Reysol	3–3	Nagoya Grampus	Kashiwa
17:00 JST (UTC+9)	Kudo 4', 63'; Domingues 14'; Kurisawa (yellow card) 6' (yellow-red card) 45+1'	Report	T.Tanaka 3'; Masukawa 49'; Tamada 71'	Stadium: Hitachi Kashiwa Soccer Stadium; Attendance: 8,180; Referee: Takuto Okabe

13 April 2013 Round 6	Ventforet Kofu	3–1	Kashiwa Reysol	Kōfu
14:00 JST (UTC+9)	Fukuda 7'; Hugo 12'; Tsuchiya 77'	Report	Aoyama 26' (o.g.)	Stadium: Yamanashi Chuo Bank Stadium; Attendance: 10,569; Referee: Hajime Matsuo

20 April 2013 Round 7	Sagan Tosu	0–3	Kashiwa Reysol	Tosu
15:00 JST (UTC+9)		Report	Cléo 13'; Masushima 73'; Kudo 76'	Stadium: Tosu Stadium; Attendance: 7,287; Referee: Minoru Tojo

26 April 2013 Round 8	Kashiwa Reysol	0–4	Omiya Ardija	Kashiwa
19:00 JST (UTC+9)		Report	Novaković 19', 55' (pen.); Takahashi 45'; Cho 63'	Stadium: Hitachi Kashiwa Soccer Stadium; Attendance: 8,086; Referee: Toma Iemoto

6 May 2013 Round 9	Kashiwa Reysol	2–1	Yokohama F. Marinos	Kashiwa
19:00 JST (UTC+9)	Cléo 8'; Kudo 60'	Report	Hyōdō 22'	Stadium: Hitachi Kashiwa Soccer Stadium; Attendance: 13,621; Referee: Yudai Yamamoto

11 May 2013 Round 10	Júbilo Iwata	0–1	Kashiwa Reysol	Iwata
15:00 JST (UTC+9)		Report	Wagner 62'	Stadium: Yamaha Stadium; Attendance: 9,444; Referee: Jumpei Iida

18 May 2013 Round 11	Kashiwa Reysol	1–3	Cerezo Osaka	Kashiwa
15:00 JST (UTC+9)	Kudo 26'	Report	Yamaguchi 45+3'; Kakitani 77', 90+4'	Stadium: Hitachi Kashiwa Soccer Stadium; Attendance: 11,056; Referee: Hajime Matsuo

26 May 2013 Round 12	Kashiwa Reysol	2–6	Urawa Red Diamonds	Kashiwa
17:00 JST (UTC+9)	Tanaka 76'; Kondo 86'	Report	Haraguchi 17'; Kashiwagi 45', 63'; Márcio Richardes 69', 87'; Moriwaki 79'	Stadium: Hitachi Kashiwa Soccer Stadium; Attendance: 34,021; Referee: Nobutsugu Murakami

29 May 2013 Round 13	Sanfrecce Hiroshima	0–0	Kashiwa Reysol	Hiroshima
19:00 JST (UTC+9)		Report		Stadium: Hiroshima Big Arch; Attendance: 10,045; Referee: Yoshiro Imamura

6 July 2013 Round 14	Albirex Niigata	3–2	Kashiwa Reysol	Niigata
19:00 JST (UTC+9)	Kawamata 49'; Tanaka 88'; Okamoto 90+4'	Report	Kudo 57'; Cléo 83'	Stadium: Niigata Stadium; Attendance: 26,547; Referee: Jumpei Iida

10 July 2013 Round 15	Shonan Bellmare	1–2	Kashiwa Reysol	Hiratsuka
20:00 JST (UTC+9)	Masashi Kamekawa (yellow card) 54' (goal) 61'; Ono (yellow card) 59'	Summary	Fujita (yellow card) 41'; Otani (yellow card) 73'; Tanaka 79'; Kondo 81'; Kudo (yellow card) 84'	Stadium: Shonan BMW Stadium Hiratsuka; Attendance: 7,319; Referee: Ryuji Sato

13 July 2013 Round 16	Kashiwa Reysol	2–1	Kashima Antlers	Kashiwa
19:00 JST (UTC+9)	Cléo 67', 90+2'	Report	Davi 42'	Stadium: Hitachi Kashiwa Soccer Stadium; Attendance: 25,904; Referee: Yoshiro Imamura

17 July 2013 Round 17	Kashiwa Reysol	2–2	Shimizu S-Pulse	Kashiwa
19:00 JST (UTC+9)	Suzuki 45'; Kudo 90+3'	Report	Muramatsu 50'; Ito 56'	Stadium: Hitachi Kashiwa Soccer Stadium; Attendance: 7,013; Referee: Kenji Ogiya

31 July 2013 Round 18	Yokohama F. Marinos	1–1	Kashiwa Reysol	Nissan Stadium
19:30 JST (UTC+9)	Marquinhos 31' (pen.)	Report	Nakazawa 89' (o.g.)	Attendance: 20,294; Referee: Nobutsugu Murakami

3 August 2013 Round 19	Kashiwa Reysol	2–1	Sagan Tosu	Kashiwa
19:00 JST (UTC+9)	Kudo 30', 65'	Report	Nilson 88'	Stadium: Hitachi Kashiwa Soccer Stadium; Attendance: 8,815; Referee: Futoshi Nakamura

10 August 2013 Round 20	Oita Trinita	0–0	Kashiwa Reysol	Ōita
19:00 JST (UTC+9)		Report		Stadium: Ōita Bank Dome; Attendance: 23,814; Referee: Hajime Matsuo

17 August 2013 Round 21	Kashiwa Reysol	0–0	Vegalta Sendai	Kashiwa
19:00 JST (UTC+9)		Report		Stadium: Hitachi Kashiwa Soccer Stadium; Attendance: 11,838; Referee: Toshimitsu Yoshida

24 August 2013 Round 22	Omiya Ardija	2–3	Kashiwa Reysol	Ōmiya-ku
19:00 JST (UTC+9)	Ljubijankič 45' (pen.); Watanabe 50'	Report	Tanaka 4', 27'; Sawa 65'	Stadium: NACK5 Stadium Omiya; Attendance: 11,661; Referee: Yuichi Nishimura

28 August 2013 Round 23	Kashiwa Reysol	5–2	Shonan Bellmare	Kashiwa
19:00 JST (UTC+9)	Kudo 17', 62'; Kano 51', 58'; Tanaka 67'	Report	Nagaki 45'; Otake 71'	Stadium: Hitachi Kashiwa Soccer Stadium; Attendance: 8,110; Referee: Hiroyuki Kimura

31 August 2013 Round 24	Kashima Antlers	3–1	Kashiwa Reysol	Kashima
19:30 JST (UTC+9)	Osako 3'; Juninho 14', 66'; Maeno (yellow card) 72'	Summary	Jorge Wagner (yellow card) 33'; Kudo 53'; Otani (yellow card) 60'	Stadium: Kashima Soccer Stadium; Attendance: 16,212; Referee: (Japan) Itaru Hirose

13 September 2013 Round 25	Kashiwa Reysol	1–3	Júbilo Iwata	Kashiwa
JST (UTC+9)	Tanaka 56'	Report	Suganuma 2'; Maeda 7', 63'	Stadium: Hitachi Kashiwa Soccer Stadium; Attendance: 8,499; Referee: Hajime Matsuo

20 September 2013 Round 26	Cerezo Osaka	1–1	Kashiwa Reysol	Osaka
17:00 JST (UTC+9)	Kakitani 82'	Report	Kudo 39'	Stadium: Kincho Stadium; Attendance: 33,174; Referee: Minoru Tojo

27 September 2013 Round 27	Kashiwa Reysol	1–1	Albirex Niigata	Kashiwa
15:00 JST (UTC+9)	Cléo 75'	Report	Kawamata 32'	Stadium: Hitachi Kashiwa Soccer Stadium; Attendance: 10,290; Referee: Kenji Ogiya

6 October 2013 Round 28	Kawasaki Frontale	3–2	Kashiwa Reysol	Kawasaki
14:00 JST (UTC+9)	Okubo 6', 50' (pen.); Renatinho 86'	Report	Wagner 57' (pen.)	Stadium: Todoroki Athletics Stadium; Attendance: 14,388; Referee: Takuya Maeda

19 October 2013 Round 29	Kashiwa Reysol	2–0	Ventforet Kofu	Kashiwa
15:00 JST (UTC+9)	Watanabe 70'; Cléo 90+3'	Report		Stadium: Hitachi Kashiwa Soccer Stadium; Attendance: 9,011; Referee: Hiroyoshi Takayama

27 October 2013 Round 30	Urawa Red Diamonds	2–1	Kashiwa Reysol	Saitama
16:00 JST (UTC+9)	Kashiwagi 6', 11'	Report	Kudo 14'	Stadium: Saitama Stadium 2002; Attendance: 34,814; Referee: Yudai Yamamoto

10 November 2013 Round 31	Kashiwa Reysol	1–1	Sanfrecce Hiroshima	Kashiwa
13:00 JST (UTC+9)	Ota 75'	Report	Aoyama 79'	Stadium: Hitachi Kashiwa Soccer Stadium; Attendance: 12,103; Referee: Masaaki Iemoto Toma

23 November 2013 Round 32	Nagoya Grampus	3–2	Kashiwa Reysol	Toyota
17:00 JST (UTC+9)	Ogawa 19', 60'; Daniel 90+3'	Report	Ota 41'; Kudo 81'	Stadium: Toyota Stadium; Attendance: 17,483; Referee: Nobutsugu Murakami

29 November 2013 Round 33	Kashiwa Reysol	4–1	FC Tokyo	Kashiwa
JST (UTC+9)	Tanaka 39' (pen.), 45+3' (pen.), 86'; Kudo 46'	Report	Ishikawa 82'	Stadium: Hitachi Kashiwa Soccer Stadium; Attendance: 13,930; Referee: Itaru Hirose

7 December 2013 Round 34	Shimizu S-Pulse	1–2	Kashiwa Reysol	Shizuoka
15:30 JST (UTC+9)	Takagi 10'; Radončić (yellow card) 18' (yellow-red card) 72'	Report	Ota 35'; Tanaka 82'	Stadium: Outsourcing Stadium Nihondaira; Attendance: 14,185; Referee: Hajime Matsuo

==== League table ====
Pos	Team	Pld	W	D	L	GF	GA	GD	Pts
8	FC Tokyo	34	16	6	12	61	47	+14	54
9	Shimizu S-Pulse	34	15	5	14	48	57	−9	50
10	Kashiwa Reysol	34	13	9	12	56	59	−3	48
11	Nagoya Grampus	34	13	8	13	47	48	−1	47
12	Sagan Tosu	34	13	7	14	54	63	−9	46

Updated to match(es) played on 7 December 2013. Source: J.League Division 1
Rules for classification: 1) points; 2) goal difference; 3) number of goals scored.

=== J.League Cup ===
23 June 2013 Quarter-finals 1st leg	Sanfrecce Hiroshima	1–2	Kashiwa Reysol	Hiroshima
19:03 JST (UTC+9)	59' Takahagi	Report	55' Tanaka; 61' Kudo	Stadium: EDION Stadium Hiroshima; Attendance: 9,427; Referee: Kimura

30 June 2013 Quarter-finals 2nd leg	Kashiwa Reysol	0–1 (a 2–2 agg.)	Sanfrecce Hiroshima	Kashiwa
19:00 JST (UTC+9)		Report	Sato 59'; Shimizu (yellow card) 72' (yellow-red card) 86'	Stadium: Hitachi Kashiwa Stadium; Attendance: 7,775; Referee: Tojo

7 September 2013 Semi-final 1st leg	Kashiwa Reysol	4–0	Yokohama F. Marinos	Kashiwa
19:00 JST (UTC+9)	Tanaka 18', 44'; Jorge Wagner 45+2', 85'	Report		Stadium: Hitachi Kashiwa Stadium; Attendance: 10,532; Referee: Toshimitsu Yoshida

12 October 2013 Semi-final 2nd leg	Yokohama F. Marinos	2–0 (2–4 agg.)	Kashiwa Reysol	Yokohama
13:00 JST (UTC+9)	Marquinhos 32'; Sato 45+3'	Report		Stadium: Nissan Stadium; Attendance: 10,071; Referee: Masaaki Iemoto Toma

2 November 2013 Final	Urawa Reds	0–1	Kashiwa Reysol	Tokyo
13:10 JST (UTC+9)		Summary	Kudo 45+2'	Stadium: Tokyo National Stadium; Attendance: 46,675; Referee: Kenji Ogiya

=== Emperor's Cup ===
4 September 2013 Second Round	Kashiwa Reysol	4–2	University of Tsukuba	Kashiwa
19:00 JST (UTC+9)	Cléo 13', 22'; Hashimoto 39'; Ota 70'	Report	Nakano 17'; Akazaki 84'	Stadium: Hitachi Kashiwa Soccer Stadium; Attendance: 2,635; Referee: Masaaki Lehon

16 October 2013 Third Round	Kashiwa Reysol	1–0	Fagiano Okayama	Kashiwa
19:03 JST (UTC+9)	Cléo 89' (pen.)	Report		Stadium: Hitachi Kashiwa Soccer Stadium; Attendance: 2,838

16 November 2013 Fourth Round	Kashiwa Reysol	0–1	Oita Trinita	Okayama
13:00 JST (UTC+9)		Report	Nishi 90+1'	Stadium: Kanko Stadium; Attendance: 2,510; Referee: Toshimitsu Yoshida

=== AFC Champions League ===
==== Group stage ====
Pos	Team	Pld	W	D	L	GF	GA	GD	Pts	Qualification	KSW	CCM	GUI	SUW
1	(Japan) Kashiwa Reysol	6	4	2	0	14	4	+10	14	Advance to knockout stage	—	3–1	1–1	0–0
2	(Australia) Central Coast Mariners	6	2	1	3	5	9	−4	7	Advance to knockout stage	0–3	—	2–1	0–0
3	(China) Guizhou Renhe	6	1	3	2	6	7	−1	6		0–1	2–1	—	2–2
4	(South Korea) Suwon Samsung Bluewings	6	0	4	2	4	9	−5	4		2–6	0–1	0–0	—

27 February 2013 1	Guizhou Renhe (China)	0–1	(Japan) Kashiwa Reysol	Guiyang, China
20:30 JST (UTC+9)		Report; Summary	Cléo 45+1'	Stadium: Guiyang Olympic Sports Center; Attendance: 28,411; Referee: Khalil Al Ghamdi (Saudi Arabia)

13 March 2013 2	Kashiwa Reysol (Japan)	3–1	(Australia) Central Coast Mariners	Kashiwa, Japan
19:00 JST (UTC+9)	Leandro Domingues 21', 88'; Kano 67'	Report; Summary	Zwaanswijk 8'	Stadium: Hitachi Kashiwa Soccer Stadium; Attendance: 6,472; Referee: Ali Al-Badwawi (UAE)

3 April 2013 3	Suwon Samsung Bluewings (South Korea)	2–6	(Japan) Kashiwa Reysol	Suwon, South Korea
19:30 JST (UTC+9)	Choi 52'; Ristić 73' (pen.)	Report	Tanaka 16', 67'; Kurisawa 51', 75'; Kudo 55', 90+3'	Stadium: Suwon World Cup Stadium; Attendance: 7,845; Referee: Mohsen Torky (Iran)

9 April 2013 4	Kashiwa Reysol (Japan)	0–0	(South Korea) Suwon Samsung Bluewings	Kashiwa, Japan
19:00 JST (UTC+9)		Report		Stadium: Hitachi Kashiwa Soccer Stadium; Attendance: 7,269; Referee: Banjar Al-Dosari (Qatar)

23 April 2013 5	Kashiwa Reysol (Japan)	1–1	(China) Guizhou Renhe	Kashiwa, Japan
19:00 JST (UTC+9)	Masushima 50'	Report	Li Kai 86'	Stadium: Hitachi Kashiwa Soccer Stadium; Attendance: 6,083; Referee: Saeid Mozaffarizadeh (Iran)

30 April 2013 6	Central Coast Mariners (Australia)	0–3	(Japan) Kashiwa Reysol	Gosford, Australia
18:00 JST (UTC+9)		Report	Kudo 59'; Cléo 79'; Domingues 85'	Stadium: Bluetongue Stadium; Attendance: 7,623; Referee: Valentin Kovalenko (Uzbekistan)

==== Knockout stage ====
15 May 2013 Round of 16 1st leg	Jeonbuk Hyundai Motors (South Korea)	0–2	(Japan) Kashiwa Reysol	Jeonju, South Korea
19:00 JST (UTC+9)		Report	Kudo 3'; Masushima 74'	Stadium: Jeonju World Cup Stadium; Attendance: 9,431; Referee: Mohamed Al Zarouni (United Arab Emirates)

22 May 2013 Round of 16 2nd leg	Kashiwa Reysol (Japan)	3–2 (5–2 agg.)	(South Korea) Jeonbuk Hyundai Motors	Kashiwa, Japan
19:00 JST (UTC+9)	Watanabe 43'; Jorge Wagner 50'; Kudo 69'	Report	Masushima 22' (o.g.); Oris 87'	Stadium: Hitachi Kashiwa Soccer Stadium; Attendance: 8,897; Referee: Abdullah Al Hilali (Oman)

21 August 2013 Quarterfinal 1st leg	Kashiwa Reysol (Japan)	1–1	(Saudi Arabia) Al Shabab	Kashiwa, Japan
19:00 JST (UTC+9)	Kudo 21'	Report	Fernando 44'	Stadium: Hitachi Kashiwa Soccer Stadium; Attendance: 11,299; Referee: Kim Jong-Hyeok (South Korea)

19 September 2013 Quarterfinal 2nd leg	Al Shabab (Saudi Arabia)	2–2 (3 – 3 (a) agg.)	(Japan) Kashiwa Reysol	Riyadh, Saudi Arabia
02:15 JST (UTC+9)	Hazazi 10'; Fallatah 85'	Report	Kwak Tae-Hwi 13' (o.g.); Kondo 73'	Stadium: King Fahd International Stadium; Attendance: 6,830; Referee: Nawaf Shukralla (Bahrain)

25 September 2013 Semifinal 1st leg	Kashiwa Reysol (Japan)	1–4	(China) Guangzhou Evergrande	Kashiwa, Japan
19:00 JST (UTC+9)	Wagner 10'	Report	Muriqui 58', 90+1'; Conca 67', 82'	Stadium: Hitachi Kashiwa Soccer Stadium; Attendance: 11,932; Referee: Valentin Kovalenko (Uzbekistan)

2 October 2013 Semifinal 2nd leg	Guangzhou Evergrande (China)	4–0 (8–1 agg.)	(Japan) Kashiwa Reysol	Guangzhou, China
21:00 JST (UTC+9)	Elkeson 16'; Conca 57'; Muriqui 79', 88'	Report		Stadium: Tianhe Stadium; Referee: Abdulrahman Abdou (Qatar)

== Squad statistics ==
As of 8 December 2013

=== Appearances and goals ===
No.	Pos	Nat	Player	Total		J-League		J-League Cup		Emperor's Cup		Champions League	
No.	Pos	Nat	Player	Apps	Goals	Apps	Goals	Apps	Goals	Apps	Goals	Apps	Goals
2	DF	(Japan) JPN	Masato Fujita	27	0	13+2	0	4+1	0	2+0	0	5+0	0
3	DF	(Japan) JPN	Naoya Kondo	49	3	31+0	2	5+0	0	2+0	0	11+0	1
4	DF	(Japan) JPN	Daisuke Suzuki	36	1	22+1	1	2+0	0	2+0	0	9+0	0
5	DF	(Japan) JPN	Tatsuya Masushima	39	3	22+3	1	2+1	0	2+0	0	8+1	2
7	MF	(Japan) JPN	Hidekazu Otani	46	0	31+0	0	4+0	0	2+0	0	9+0	0
8	FW	(Japan) JPN	Masakatsu Sawa	14	1	3+4	1	0+2	0	1+1	0	0+3	0
9	FW	(Japan) JPN	Masato Kudo	50	27	33+0	19	4+0	2	1+0	0	12+0	6
10	MF	(Brazil) BRA	Leandro Domingues	20	5	12+0	2	1+0	0	1+0	0	6+0	3
11	FW	(Brazil) BRA	Cléo	45	14	21+6	9	2+3	0	2+0	3	10+1	2
14	DF	(Japan) JPN	Kenta Kano	26	3	14+3	2	2+0	0	2+0	0	3+2	1
15	MF	(Brazil) BRA	Jorge Wagner	42	6	18+9	2	5+0	2	0+0	0	9+1	2
16	GK	(Japan) JPN	Koji Inada	3	0	1+1	0	0+0	0	1+0	0	0+0	0
17	MF	(Japan) JPN	Hiroki Akino	5	0	0+2	0	0+0	0	0+2	0	0+1	0
18	MF	(Japan) JPN	Junya Tanaka	46	16	21+10	11	4+0	3	1+1	0	7+2	2
19	FW	(Japan) JPN	Yū Kimura	4	0	0+3	0	0+0	0	0+0	0	0+1	0
20	MF	(Japan) JPN	Akimi Barada	34	0	15+8	0	1+1	0	1+1	0	7+0	0
21	GK	(Japan) JPN	Takanori Sugeno	52	0	33+0	0	5+0	0	2+0	0	12+0	0
22	DF	(Japan) JPN	Wataru Hashimoto	31	1	19+1	0	4+0	0	3+0	1	4+0	0
23	DF	(Japan) JPN	Hirofumi Watanabe	21	2	12+0	1	2+0	0	2+0	0	5+0	1
26	MF	(Japan) JPN	Tetsuro Ota	17	3	5+7	2	0+1	0	2+1	1	0+1	0
27	DF	(South Korea) KOR	Kim Chang-Soo	30	0	17+6	0	0+0	0	0+0	0	5+2	0
28	MF	(Japan) JPN	Ryoichi Kurisawa	44	2	22+4	0	5+0	0	3+0	0	9+1	2
29	MF	(Japan) JPN	Hiroyuki Taniguchi	13	0	5+3	0	1+0	0	0+0	0	2+2	0
30	FW	(Japan) JPN	Ryosuke Yamanaka	15	0	4+6	0	2+0	0	0+2	0	1+0	0
Players who appeared for Kashiwa Reysol that left during the season:

=== Top scorers ===
Place	Position	Nation	Number	Name	J-League	J-League Cup	Emperor's Cup	Champions League	Total
1	FW	(Japan)	9	Masato Kudo	19	2	0	6	27
2	MF	(Japan)	18	Junya Tanaka	11	3	0	2	16
3	FW	(Brazil)	11	Cléo	9	0	3	2	14
4	MF	(Brazil)	15	Jorge Wagner	2	2	0	2	6
5	MF	(Brazil)	10	Leandro Domingues	2	0	0	3	5
6	MF	(Japan)	26	Tetsuro Ota	2	0	1	0	3
6	DF	(Japan)	14	Kenta Kano	2	0	0	1	3
6	DF	(Japan)	3	Naoya Kondo	2	0	0	1	3
6	DF	(Japan)	5	Tatsuya Masushima	1	0	0	2	3
6				Own goal	2	0	0	1	3
11	DF	(Japan)	23	Hirofumi Watanabe	1	0	0	1	2
11	MF	(Japan)	28	Ryoichi Kurisawa	0	0	0	2	2
13	DF	(Japan)	4	Daisuke Suzuki	1	0	0	0	1
13	FW	(Japan)	8	Masakatsu Sawa	1	0	0	0	1
13	DF	(Japan)	22	Wataru Hashimoto	0	0	1	0	1
				TOTALS	54	7	5	23	89

=== Disciplinary record ===
Number	Nation	Position	Name	J-League		J.League Cup		Emperor's Cup		Champions League		Total	
Number	Nation	Position	Name	Yellow card	Red card	Yellow card	Red card	Yellow card	Red card	Yellow card	Red card	Yellow card	Red card
2	(Japan)	DF	Masato Fujita	3	0	0	0	0	0	2	0	4	0
3	(Japan)	DF	Naoya Kondo	8	0	0	0	0	0	3	0	11	0
4	(Japan)	DF	Daisuke Suzuki	2	0	0	0	0	0	1	0	3	0
5	(Japan)	DF	Tatsuya Masushima	2	0	0	0	0	0	0	0	2	0
7	(Japan)	MF	Hidekazu Otani	5	0	2	0	0	0	2	0	9	0
9	(Japan)	FW	Masato Kudo	4	0	0	0	0	0	1	0	5	0
10	(Brazil)	MF	Leandro Domingues	2	0	1	0	0	0	2	0	5	0
11	(Brazil)	FW	Cléo	1	0	1	0	0	0	1	0	3	0
14	(Japan)	DF	Kenta Kano	1	0	0	0	1	0	0	0	2	0
15	(Brazil)	MF	Jorge Wagner	3	0	2	0	0	0	2	0	7	0
17	(Japan)	MF	Hiroki Akino	1	0	0	0	1	0	0	0	2	0
18	(Japan)	MF	Junya Tanaka	0	0	0	0	0	0	1	0	1	0
20	(Japan)	MF	Akimi Barada	3	0	0	0	0	0	0	0	3	0
21	(Japan)	GK	Takanori Sugeno	1	0	1	0	0	0	1	0	3	0
22	(Japan)	DF	Wataru Hashimoto	1	0	2	0	0	0	1	0	4	0
23	(Japan)	DF	Hirofumi Watanabe	5	0	0	0	0	0	0	0	5	0
26	(Japan)	MF	Tetsuro Ota	1	0	0	0	0	0	0	0	1	0
27	(South Korea)	DF	Kim Chang-Soo	2	0	0	0	0	0	3	0	5	0
28	(Japan)	MF	Ryoichi Kurisawa	9	1	0	0	1	0	2	0	12	1
29	(Japan)	MF	Hiroyuki Taniguchi	2	0	1	0	0	0	0	0	3	0
			TOTALS	56	1	10	0	3	0	25	0	94	1
