= 2013 J.League Cup final =

Kashiwa Reysol	Urawa Reds
1	0
- Date: November 2, 2013
- Venue: National Stadium, Tokyo

2013 J.League Cup final was the 21st final of the J.League Cup competition. The final was played at National Stadium in Tokyo on November 2, 2013. Kashiwa Reysol won the championship.

== Match details ==
November 2, 2013

Kashiwa Reysol	1–0	Urawa Reds
Masato Kudo 45+2'	Report

National Stadium

Kashiwa Reysol
GK	21	(Japan) Takanori Sugeno
DF	2	(Japan) Masato Fujita	(substituted off) 46'
DF	29	(Japan) Hiroyuki Taniguchi	(substituted off) 76'
DF	3	(Japan) Naoya Kondo
DF	23	(Japan) Hirofumi Watanabe
MF	10	(Brazil) Leandro Domingues
MF	28	(Japan) Ryoichi Kurisawa
MF	20	(Japan) Akimi Barada
MF	15	(Brazil) Jorge Wagner
FW	11	(Brazil) Cleo
FW	9	(Japan) Masato Kudo
Substitutes:
GK	16	(Japan) Koji Inada
DF	5	(Japan) Tatsuya Masushima	(substituted on) 76'
MF	26	(Japan) Tetsuro Ota	(substituted on) 46'
MF	25	(Japan) Yusuke Kobayashi
MF	14	(Japan) Kenta Kano
FW	8	(Japan) Masakatsu Sawa
FW	18	(Japan) Junya Tanaka
Manager:
(Brazil) Nelsinho

Urawa Reds
GK	1	(Japan) Norihiro Yamagishi
DF	46	(Japan) Ryota Moriwaki
DF	4	(Japan) Daisuke Nasu
DF	5	(Japan) Tomoaki Makino
MF	14	(Japan) Tadaaki Hirakawa	(substituted off) 69'
MF	22	(Japan) Yuki Abe
MF	13	(Japan) Keita Suzuki	(substituted off) 77'
MF	3	(Japan) Tomoya Ugajin
MF	8	(Japan) Yosuke Kashiwagi
MF	24	(Japan) Genki Haraguchi
FW	30	(Japan) Shinzo Koroki
Substitutes:
GK	18	(Japan) Nobuhiro Kato
DF	2	(Japan) Keisuke Tsuboi
DF	17	(Japan) Mitsuru Nagata
DF	6	(Japan) Nobuhisa Yamada
MF	7	(Japan) Tsukasa Umesaki
MF	11	(Japan) Kunimitsu Sekiguchi	(substituted on) 69'
MF	10	(Brazil) Marcio Richardes	(substituted on) 77'
Manager:
(Serbia) Petrovic

== See also ==
- 2013 J.League Cup
