= 2014 Suruga Bank Championship =

2014 スルガ銀行チャンピオンシップ 2014 Copa Suruga Bank
Kashiwa Reysol	Lanús
(Japan)	(Argentina)
2	1
- Date: August 6, 2014
- Venue: Hitachi Kashiwa Soccer Stadium, Kashiwa
- Referee: Kim Jong-hyeok (South Korea)
- Attendance: 10,140
- Weather: Cloudy; 27.9 °C (82.2 °F); 81% humidity

The 2014 Suruga Bank Championship (Japanese: スルガ銀行チャンピオンシップ2014; Spanish: Copa Suruga Bank 2014) was the seventh edition of the Suruga Bank Championship, the club football match co-organized by the Japan Football Association, the football governing body of Japan, CONMEBOL, the football governing body of South America, and J. League, the professional football league of Japan, between the winners of the previous season's J. League Cup and Copa Sudamericana.

The match was contested between Japanese team Kashiwa Reysol, the 2013 J. League Cup champion, and Argentine team Lanús, the 2013 Copa Sudamericana champion. It was hosted by Kashiwa Reysol at the Hitachi Kashiwa Soccer Stadium in Kashiwa on August 6, 2014.

For the fifth consecutive year, the match was won by the Japanese host team, as Kashiwa Reysol won 2–1 to earn their first Suruga Bank Championship.

== Qualified teams ==
Team	Qualification	Previous appearances
(Japan) Kashiwa Reysol	2013 J. League Cup champion	None
(Argentina) Lanús	2013 Copa Sudamericana champion	None

== Format ==
The Suruga Bank Championship was played as a single match, with the J. League Cup champion hosting the match. If the score was tied at the end of regulation, the penalty shoot-out was used to determine the winner (no extra time was played). A maximum of seven substitutions may be made during the match.

== Match details ==
August 6, 2014
19:00 UTC+9

Kashiwa Reysol (Japan)	2–1	(Argentina) Lanús
Takayama 43'; Leandro 88' (pen.)	Report	Masushima 59' (o.g.)

Hitachi Kashiwa Soccer Stadium, Kashiwa
Attendance: 10,140
Referee: Kim Jong-hyeok (South Korea)

Kashiwa Reysol	Lanús

GK	21	(Japan) Takanori Sugeno
DF	2	(Japan) Masato Fujita
DF	4	(Japan) Daisuke Suzuki
DF	5	(Japan) Tatsuya Masushima
DF	22	(Japan) Wataru Hashimoto
MF	17	(Japan) Hiroki Akino
MF	28	(Japan) Ryoichi Kurisawa
MF	7	(Japan) Hidekazu Otani (c)		(substituted off) 77'
MF	13	(Japan) Kaoru Takayama		(substituted off) 90+2'
FW	11	(Brazil) Leandro	(yellow card) 90+4'
FW	9	(Japan) Masato Kudo
Substitutes:
GK	1	(Japan) Kazushige Kirihata
DF	23	(Japan) Hirofumi Watanabe		(substituted on) 90+2'
DF	27	(South Korea) Kim Chang-soo
MF	20	(Japan) Akimi Barada
MF	25	(Japan) Yusuke Kobayashi		(substituted on) 77'
MF	26	(Japan) Tetsuro Ota
FW	19	(Japan) Yu Kimura
Manager:
(Brazil) Nelsinho Baptista

GK	1	(Argentina) Agustín Marchesín
DF	4	(Argentina) Carlos Araujo	(yellow card) 82'
DF	14	(Paraguay) Gustavo Gómez
DF	2	(Argentina) Diego Braghieri	(yellow card) 87'
DF	6	(Argentina) Maximiliano Velázquez (c)		(substituted off) 90+3'
MF	5	(Argentina) Diego González	(red card) 90+3'
MF	15	(Argentina) Leandro Somoza
MF	22	(Argentina) Jorge Ortiz
MF	16	(Paraguay) Víctor Ayala		(substituted off) 56'
FW	10	(Argentina) Silvio Romero		(substituted off) 74'
FW	9	(Uruguay) Santiago Silva
Substitutes:
GK	12	(Argentina) Matías Ibáñez
DF	24	(Argentina) Matías Martínez
DF	3	(Uruguay) Alejandro Silva
MF	21	(Argentina) Nicolás Pasquini		(substituted on) 90+3'
MF	11	(Argentina) Jorge Valdez Chamorro		(substituted on) 56'
FW	23	(Argentina) Oscar Benítez
FW	18	(Argentina) Lucas Melano		(substituted on) 74'
Manager:
(Argentina) Guillermo Barros Schelotto

Assistant referees:
Yang Byoung-eun (South Korea)
Yoon Kwang-yeol (South Korea)
Fourth official:
Hiroyuki Kimura (Japan)
