= 2011 Kashiwa Reysol season =

Kashiwa Reysol
2011 season
- Manager: Nelsinho Baptista
- J.League Division 1: Champions
- Emperor's Cup: Fourth Round
- J.League Cup: First Round
- Club World Cup: 4th
Home colours	Away colours

The 2011 Kashiwa Reysol season was Kashiwa Reysol's first season in J.League Division 1 since 2009 and 39th overall in the Japanese top flight. It also includes the 2011 J.League Cup, and the 2011 Emperor's Cup.

As a result of their first J.League title win (their second overall counting the 1972 JSL title), they were participants in the 2011 FIFA Club World Cup as Japan were the tournament hosts. Their title win was the first immediate win for a second-tier champion.

== Competitions ==
=== J.League ===
==== League table ====
Pos	Team	Pld	W	D	L	GF	GA	GD	Pts	Qualification or relegation
1	Kashiwa Reysol (C)	34	23	3	8	65	42	+23	72	Qualification for 2012 AFC Champions League group stage (Note: League champions also qualified for the 2011 FIFA Club World Cup play-off stage.; The winners of the 2011 Emperor's Cup, FC Tokyo, which played in the 2011 J.League Division 2, also qualified for the group stage of the 2012 AFC Champions League.)
2	Nagoya Grampus	34	21	8	5	67	36	+31	71	Qualification for 2012 AFC Champions League group stage
3	Gamba Osaka	34	21	7	6	78	51	+27	70	Qualification for 2012 AFC Champions League group stage
4	Vegalta Sendai	34	14	14	6	39	25	+14	56	
5	Yokohama F. Marinos	34	16	8	10	46	40	+6	56	

Updated to match(es) played on December 3, 2011. Source: J.League Division 1
Rules for classification: 1st points; 2nd goal differential; 3rd goals scored; 4th head-to-head results; 5th disciplinary points; 6th draw. If two clubs are tied for first place, both clubs will be declared.
(C) Champions

==== Results summary ====
5 March 2011 Round 1	Kashiwa Reysol	3 – 0	Shimizu S-Pulse	Kashiwa Hitachi Stadium
Saturday 19:04	Wagner 21', Park 65', Leandro 68'	Report		Attendance: 10,390; Referee: Sato

12 March 2011 Round 2	Cerezo Osaka	v	Kashiwa Reysol
Saturday 15:00

19 March 2011 Round 3	Kashiwa Reysol	v	Vegalta Sendai
Saturday 15:00

2 April 2011 Round 4	Kashiwa Reysol	v	Sanfrecce Hiroshima
Saturday 13:00

9 April 2011 Round 5	Kawasaki Frontale	v	Kashiwa Reysol
Saturday 15:00

16 April 2011 Round 6	Kashiwa Reysol	v	Kashima Antlers
Saturday 15:30

23 April 2011 Round 7	Omiya Ardija	v	Kashiwa Reysol
Saturday 16:00

29 April 2011 Round 8	Kashiwa Reysol	v	Ventforet Kofu
Friday 14:00

3 May 2011 Round 9	Montedio Yamagata	v	Kashiwa Reysol
Tuesday 19:00

7 May 2011 Round 10	Kashiwa Reysol	v	Urawa Red Diamonds
Saturday 16:00

14 May 2011 Round 11	Albirex Niigata	v	Kashiwa Reysol
Saturday 19:00

21 May 2011 Round 12	Nagoya Grampus	v	Kashiwa Reysol
Saturday 16:00

28 May 2011 Round 13	Kashiwa Reysol	v	Vissel Kobe
Saturday 14:00

11 June 2011 Round 14	Yokohama F. Marinos	v	Kashiwa Reysol
Saturday 14:00

15 June 2011 Round 15	Kashiwa Reysol	v	Júbilo Iwata
Wednesday 19:00

18 June 2011 Round 16	Avispa Fukuoka	v	Kashiwa Reysol
Saturday 19:00

22 June 2011 Round 17	Kashiwa Reysol	v	Gamba Osaka
Wednesday 19:00

25 June 2011 Round 18	Ventforet Kofu	v	Kashiwa Reysol
Saturday 19:00

31 July 2011 Round 19	Vegalta Sendai	v	Kashiwa Reysol
Sunday 19:00

6 August 2011 Round 20	Kashiwa Reysol	v	Yokohama F. Marinos
Saturday 19:00

14 August 2011 Round 21	Júbilo Iwata	v	Kashiwa Reysol
Sunday 19:00

20 August 2011 Round 22	Kashiwa Reysol	v	Avispa Fukuoka
Saturday 19:00

24 August 2011 Round 23	Gamba Osaka	v	Kashiwa Reysol
Wednesday 19:00

28 August 2011 Round 24	Kashiwa Reysol	v	Kawasaki Frontale
Sunday 18:00

10 September 2011 Round 25	Kashiwa Reysol	v	Nagoya Grampus
Saturday

17 September 2011 Round 26	Vissel Kobe	v	Kashiwa Reysol
Saturday

25 September 2011 Round 27	Kashiwa Reysol	v	Omiya Ardija
Sunday

2 October 2011 Round 28	Kashima Antlers	v	Kashiwa Reysol
Sunday

16 October 2011 Round 29	Kashiwa Reysol	v	Montedio Yamagata
Sunday

22 October 2011 Round 30	Sanfrecce Hiroshima	v	Kashiwa Reysol
Saturday

29 October 2011 Round 31	Kashiwa Reysol	v	Albirex Niigata
Saturday

20 November 2011 Round 32	Shimizu S-Pulse	v	Kashiwa Reysol
Sunday

26 November 2011 Round 33	Kashiwa Reysol	v	Cerezo Osaka
Saturday

3 December 2011 Round 34	Urawa Red Diamonds	v	Kashiwa Reysol
Saturday

==== Results by round ====
Round	1	2	3	4	5	6	7	8	9	10	11	12	13	14	15	16	17	18	19	20	21	22	23	24	25	26	27	28	29	30	31	32	33	34
Ground	H	A	H	H	A	H	A	H	A	H	A	A	H	A	H	A	H	A	A	H	A	H	A	H	H	A	H	A	H	A	H	A	H	A
Result	W																																	
Position	1																																	

Updated to match(es) played on 6 March 2011. Source: "World-Football.net".
A = Away; H = Home; W = Win; D = Draw; L = Loss

=== Emperor's Cup ===
2011-10-08 Second Round	Kashiwa Reysol	2 – 0	Tochigi Uva	Kashiwanoha Park Stadium, Kashiwa
13:00	Masushima 4'; Leandro 59'	Report		Attendance: 3,110; Referee: Takuto Okabe

2011-11-16 Third Round	Kashiwa Reysol	6 – 1	Ventforet Kofu	Hitachi Kashiwa Soccer Stadium, Kashiwa
19:00	Jorge Wagner 10'; Kudo 26'; Kitajima 29'; Hashimoto 37'; Tanaka 67', 80'	Report	Yabu 13'	Attendance: 3,950; Referee: Takuya Maeda

2011-12-21 Fourth Round	Nagoya Grampus	3 – 3 (a.e.t.) (9 – 8 p)	Kashiwa Reysol	Mizuho Athletic Stadium, Nagoya
19:00	Nagai 77', 96'; Masukawa 88'	Report	Leandro Domingues 42', 115'; Kudo 66'	Attendance: 5,618; Referee: Hiroyoshi Takayama
	Penalties
	Fujimoto (penalty scored); Alex (penalty scored); Yoshimura (penalty scored); Kanazaki (penalty scored); K. Hashimoto (penalty scored); Nagai (penalty missed); Masukawa (penalty scored); Chiyotanda (penalty scored); Narazaki (penalty scored); Córdoba (penalty scored)		(penalty scored) Leandro Domingues; (penalty scored) Sawa; (penalty scored) Otani; (penalty scored) Kondo; (penalty scored) Mizuno; (penalty missed) Kudo; (penalty scored) W. Hashimoto; (penalty scored) Masushima; (penalty scored) Kitajima; (penalty missed) Sugeno

=== FIFA Club World Cup ===
8 December 2011 Play-off	Kashiwa Reysol (Japan)	2 – 0	(New Zealand) Auckland City	Toyota Stadium, Toyota
19:45	Tanaka 37'; Kudo 40'	Report		Attendance: 18,754; Referee: Nicola Rizzoli (Italy)

11 December 2011 Quarter-finals	Kashiwa Reysol (Japan)	1 – 1 (a.e.t.) (4 – 3 p)	(Mexico) Monterrey	Toyota Stadium, Toyota
19:30	Leandro Domingues 53'	Report	Suazo 58'	Attendance: 27,525; Referee: Peter O'Leary (New Zealand)
	Penalties
	Leandro Domingues (penalty scored); Jorge Wagner (penalty scored); Kurisawa (penalty scored); Tanaka (penalty missed); Hayashi (penalty scored)		(penalty missed) L. Pérez; (penalty scored) Suazo; (penalty scored) Ayoví; (penalty missed) Orozco; (penalty scored) Delgado

14 December 2011 Semi-finals	Kashiwa Reysol (Japan)	1 – 3	(Brazil) Santos	Toyota Stadium, Toyota
19:30	Sakai 54'	Report	Neymar 19'; Borges 24'; Danilo 63'	Attendance: 29,173; Referee: Nicola Rizzoli (Italy)

18 December 2011 3rd Place Match	Kashiwa Reysol (Japan)	0 – 0 (3 – 5 p)	(Qatar) Al-Sadd	International Stadium Yokohama
16:30		Report		Attendance: 60,527; Referee: Noumandiez Doué (Ivory Coast)
	Penalties
	Jorge Wagner (penalty scored); Sawa (penalty scored); Hayashi (penalty missed); Otani (penalty scored)		(penalty scored) Niang; (penalty scored) Keïta; (penalty scored) Majid; (penalty scored) Al Haidos; (penalty scored) Belhadj
