= 2011 in Japanese football =

2011 season

Japanese football in 2011

== J.League Division 1 ==
Pos	Team	Pld	W	D	L	GF	GA	GD	Pts	Qualification or relegation
1	Kashiwa Reysol (C)	34	23	3	8	65	42	+23	72	Qualification to 2011 Club World Cup and 2012 Champions League
2	Nagoya Grampus	34	21	8	5	67	36	+31	71	Qualification to 2012 Champions League
3	Gamba Osaka	34	21	7	6	78	51	+27	70	Qualification to 2012 Champions League
4	Vegalta Sendai	34	14	14	6	39	25	+14	56	
5	Yokohama F. Marinos	34	16	8	10	46	40	+6	56	
6	Kashima Antlers	34	13	11	10	53	40	+13	50	
7	Sanfrecce Hiroshima	34	14	8	12	52	49	+3	50	
8	Júbilo Iwata	34	13	8	13	53	45	+8	47	
9	Vissel Kobe	34	13	7	14	44	45	−1	46	
10	Shimizu S-Pulse	34	11	12	11	42	51	−9	45	
11	Kawasaki Frontale	34	13	5	16	52	53	−1	44	
12	Cerezo Osaka	34	11	10	13	67	53	+14	43	
13	Omiya Ardija	34	10	12	12	38	48	−10	42	
14	Albirex Niigata	34	10	9	15	38	46	−8	39	
15	Urawa Red Diamonds	34	8	12	14	36	43	−7	36	
16	Ventforet Kofu (R)	34	9	6	19	42	63	−21	33	Relegation to 2012 J.League Division 2
17	Avispa Fukuoka (R)	34	6	4	24	34	75	−41	22	Relegation to 2012 J.League Division 2
18	Montedio Yamagata (R)	34	5	6	23	23	64	−41	21	Relegation to 2012 J.League Division 2

Updated to match(es) played on December 3, 2011. Source: J. League Division 1
Rules for classification: 1st points; 2nd goal differential; 3rd goals scored; 4th head-to-head results; 5th disciplinary points; 6th draw. The winners of the 2011 Emperor's Cup, FC Tokyo, which played in the 2011 J.League Division 2, also qualified for the group stage of the 2012 AFC Champions League. If two clubs are tied for first place, both clubs will be declared champions.
(C) Champions; (R) Relegated

== J.League Division 2 ==
Pos	Team	Pld	W	D	L	GF	GA	GD	Pts	Promotion or relegation
1	FC Tokyo (C, P)	38	23	8	7	67	22	+45	77	Promotion to 2012 J.League Division 1 and Qualification to 2012 Champions League (Note: FC Tokyo, as winners of the 2011 Emperor's Cup, also qualified for the group stage of the 2012 AFC Champions League)
2	Sagan Tosu (P)	38	19	12	7	68	34	+34	69	Promotion to 2012 J.League Division 1
3	Consadole Sapporo (P)	38	21	5	12	49	32	+17	68	Promotion to 2012 J.League Division 1
4	Tokushima Vortis	38	19	8	11	51	38	+13	65	
5	Tokyo Verdy	38	16	11	11	69	45	+24	59	
6	JEF United Chiba	38	16	10	12	46	39	+7	58	
7	Kyoto Sanga	38	17	7	14	50	45	+5	58	
8	Giravanz Kitakyushu	38	16	10	12	45	46	−1	58	
9	Thespa Kusatsu	38	16	9	13	51	51	0	57	
10	Tochigi SC	38	15	11	12	44	39	+5	56	
11	Roasso Kumamoto	38	13	12	13	33	44	−11	51	
12	Oita Trinita	38	12	14	12	42	45	−3	50	
13	Fagiano Okayama	38	13	9	16	43	58	−15	48	
14	Shonan Bellmare	38	12	10	16	46	48	−2	46	
15	Ehime FC	38	10	14	14	44	54	−10	44	
16	Kataller Toyama	38	11	10	17	36	53	−17	43	
17	Mito HollyHock	38	11	9	18	40	49	−9	42	
18	Yokohama FC	38	11	8	19	40	54	−14	41	
19	Gainare Tottori	38	8	7	23	36	60	−24	31	
20	FC Gifu	38	6	6	26	39	83	−44	24	

Updated to match(es) played on December 3, 2011. Source: J.League Division 2
Rules for classification: 1st points; 2nd goal differential; 3rd goals scored; 4th head-to-head results; 5th disciplinary points; 6th draw. If two clubs are tied for first place, both clubs will be declared champions.
(C) Champions; (P) Promoted

== Japan Football League ==
Pos	Team	Pld	W	D	L	GF	GA	GD	Pts	Promotion or relegation
1	Sagawa Shiga (C)	33	23	1	9	60	34	+26	70	
2	Nagano Parceiro	33	19	6	8	51	27	+24	63	
3	Machida Zelvia (P)	33	18	7	8	61	28	+33	61	Promotion to 2012 J. League Division 2 (Note: Must hold J. League Associate Membership, pass a final inspection by J. League and finish no less than in fourth place to be promoted. V-Varen Nagasaki, though being an associate members, have announced that their stadium is not matching the J. League standards so they are not eligible for the promotion until the completion of necessary renovations. The target date is set for 2013 season. Because the maximum capacity of Division 2 set by J. League is 22 teams, no more than two clubs can be promoted.)
4	Matsumoto Yamaga (Note: J. League Associate Membership and passed a final inspection by J. League.) (P)	33	17	8	8	60	38	+22	59	Promotion to 2012 J. League Division 2
5	V-Varen Nagasaki	33	15	11	7	61	44	+17	56	
6	Honda FC	33	15	7	11	40	36	+4	52	
7	Zweigen Kanazawa	33	13	8	12	49	40	+9	47	
8	Honda Lock (Note: FC Ryukyu and Honda Lock occupied top 2 places at the end of the 17th round (11th week) and were seeded for 2011 Emperor's Cup. These clubs were automatically qualified for the tournament, while each of other JFL clubs had to go through the prefectural qualifier.)	33	12	11	10	47	45	+2	47	
9	FC Ryukyu	33	14	4	15	47	51	−4	46	
10	Tochigi Uva	33	12	9	12	40	43	−3	45	
11	Kamatamare Sanuki	33	11	7	15	39	49	−10	40	
12	SP Kyoto	33	11	5	17	43	61	−18	38	
13	MIO Biwako Kusatsu	33	11	5	17	43	65	−22	38	
14	Blaublitz Akita	33	10	7	16	38	52	−14	37	
15	Yokogawa Musashino	33	9	9	15	33	37	−4	36	
16	Arte Takasaki (R)	33	9	7	17	39	55	−16	34	Withdrawn (Note: Arte Takasaki decided to withdraw from JFL and fold the club after the end of the season, when clubs promoted from regional leagues were already determined. JFL decided that the next season will be contested by 17 clubs (i.e. without supplying an additional club from a regional league).)
17	JEF Reserves (R)	33	4	7	22	27	63	−36	19	Withdrawn (Note: JEF Reserves had submitted a request of withdrawal from the league at the end of the season regardless of team's performance. It was approved by league board on 12 September.)
18	Sony Sendai	17	3	7	7	14	24	−10	16	

Updated to match(es) played on 11 December 2011. Source: Japan Football League
Rules for classification: 1) points; 2) goal difference; 3) number of goals scored.
(C) Champions; (P) Promoted; (R) Relegated

== Emperor's Cup ==
2012-01-01
14:00

Kyoto Sanga	2–4	FC Tokyo
Nakayama 13'; Kubo 71'	Report	Konno 15'; Morishige 36'; Lucas 42', 66'

National Olympic Stadium, Shinjuku
Attendance: 41,974
Referee: Yuichi Nishimura

== J.League Cup ==
2011-10-29
13:10

Urawa Red Diamonds	0–1 (a.e.t.)	Kashima Antlers
	Report (in Japanese)	Osako 105'

Tokyo National Stadium, Tokyo
Attendance: 46,599
Referee: Minoru Tojo

== Japanese Super Cup ==
26 February 2011
Saturday 13:37

Nagoya Grampus	1–1	Kashima Antlers
Masukawa 54'	Report	66' Nozawa
Penalties
Kennedy (penalty missed); Fujimoto (penalty scored); Santos (penalty scored); Ogawa (penalty scored)	3–1	(penalty missed) Iwamasa; (penalty scored) Motoyama; (penalty missed) Alex; (penalty missed) Araiba

Nissan Stadium
Attendance: 35,963
Referee: Nishimura

== Suruga Bank Championship ==
August 3, 2011
19:00 UTC+09:00

Júbilo Iwata (Japan)	2–2	(Argentina) Independiente
Battión 9' (o.g.); Arata 58'	Report	Tuzzio 32'; Parra 47'
Penalties
Kobayashi (penalty scored); Yamada (penalty scored); Nasu (penalty missed); Komano (penalty scored); Fujita (penalty scored)	4–2	(penalty scored) Núñez; (penalty missed) Pellerano; (penalty missed) Velázquez; (penalty scored) Parra

Shizuoka Stadium, Fukuroi
Attendance: 19,034
Referee: Lee Probert (England)

== FIFA Club World Cup ==
8 December 2011 Play-off for quarter-finals	Kashiwa Reysol (Japan)	2–0	(New Zealand) Auckland City	Toyota Stadium, Toyota
19:45	Tanaka 37'; Kudo 40'	Report		Attendance: 18,754; Referee: Nicola Rizzoli (Italy)

11 December 2011 Quarter-finals	Kashiwa Reysol (Japan)	1–1 (a.e.t.) (4–3 p)	(Mexico) Monterrey	Toyota Stadium, Toyota
19:30	Leandro Domingues 53'	Report	Suazo 58'	Attendance: 27,525; Referee: Peter O'Leary (New Zealand)
	Penalties
	Leandro Domingues (penalty scored); Jorge Wagner (penalty scored); Kurisawa (penalty scored); Tanaka (penalty missed); Hayashi (penalty scored)		(penalty missed) L. Pérez; (penalty scored) Suazo; (penalty scored) Ayoví; (penalty missed) Orozco; (penalty scored) Delgado

14 December 2011 Semi-finals	Kashiwa Reysol (Japan)	1–3	(Brazil) Santos	Toyota Stadium, Toyota
19:30	Sakai 54'	Report	Neymar 19'; Borges 24'; Danilo 63'	Attendance: 29,173; Referee: Nicola Rizzoli (Italy)

18 December 2011 Third place playoff	Kashiwa Reysol (Japan)	0–0 (3–5 p)	(Qatar) Al-Sadd	International Stadium Yokohama
16:30		Report		Attendance: 60,527; Referee: Noumandiez Doué (Ivory Coast)
	Penalties
	Jorge Wagner (penalty scored); Sawa (penalty scored); Hayashi (penalty missed); Otani (penalty scored)		(penalty scored) Niang; (penalty scored) Keïta; (penalty scored) Majid; (penalty scored) Al Haidos; (penalty scored) Belhadj

== National team (Men) ==
=== Results ===
Competition	GP	W	D	L	GF	GA
2011 AFC Asian Cup	6	4	2	0	14	6
2011 Kirin Cup	2	0	2	0	0	0
International Friendly	2	2	0	0	4	0
2014 FIFA World Cup qualification (AFC)	5	3	1	1	14	2
Total	15	9	5	1	32	8

2011.01.09 2011 Asian Cup	Japan	1–1	Jordan	Doha, Qatar
	Yoshida 90'	JFA	Abdel-Fattah 45'	Stadium: Qatar SC Stadium; Attendance: 6,255

2011.01.13 2011 Asian Cup	Syria	1–2	Japan	Doha, Qatar
	Al Khatib 76' (pen.)	JFA	Hasebe 35'; K. Honda 82'	Stadium: Qatar SC Stadium; Attendance: 10,453

2011.01.17 2011 Asian Cup	Saudi Arabia	0–5	Japan	Al Rayyan, Al Rayyan
		JFA	Okazaki 8', 13', 80'; Maeda 19', 51'	Stadium: Ahmed bin Ali Stadium; Attendance: 2,022

2011.01.21 2011 Asian Cup	Japan	3–2	Qatar	Doha, Qatar
	Kagawa 29', 71'; Inoha 90'	JFA	Soria 13'; Fábio César 63'	Stadium: Al-Gharafa Stadium; Attendance: 19,479

2011.01.25 2011 Asian Cup	Japan	2–2 (a.e.t.) (3–0 p)	South Korea	Doha, Qatar
	Maeda 36'; Hosogai 97'	JFA	Ki Sung-Yueng 23' (pen.); Hwang Jae-Won 120'	Stadium: Al-Gharafa Stadium; Attendance: 16,171
	Penalties
	K. Honda (penalty scored); Okazaki (penalty scored); Nagatomo (penalty missed); Konno (penalty scored)		(penalty missed) Koo Ja-Cheol; (penalty missed) Lee Yong-Rae; (penalty missed) Hong Jeong-Ho

2011.01.29 2011 Asian Cup	Australia	0–1 (a.e.t.)	Japan	Doha, Qatar
		JFA	Lee 109'	Stadium: Khalifa International Stadium; Attendance: 37,174

2011.06.01 Kirin Cup	Japan	0–0	Peru	Niigata, Japan
		JFA		Stadium: Niigata Stadium; Attendance: 39,048

2011.06.07 Kirin Cup	Japan	0–0	Czech Republic	Kanagawa, Japan
		JFA		Stadium: International Stadium Yokohama; Attendance: 65,856

2011.08.10 International Friendly	Japan	3–0	South Korea	Hokkaido, Japan
	Kagawa 35', 55'; K. Honda 53'	JFA		Stadium: Sapporo Dome; Attendance: 38,263

2011.09.02 2014 World Cup Qualifier	Japan	1–0	North Korea	Saitama, Japan
	Yoshida 90'	JFA		Stadium: Saitama Stadium 2002; Attendance: 54,624

2011.09.06 2014 World Cup Qualifier	Uzbekistan	1–1	Japan	Tashkent, Uzbekistan
	Djeparov 8'	JFA	Okazaki 65'	Stadium: Pakhtakor Markaziy Stadium; Attendance: 32,000

2011.10.07 International Friendly	Japan	1–0	Vietnam	Hyōgo, Japan
	Lee 24'	JFA		Stadium: Kobe Wing Stadium; Attendance: 27,522

2011.10.11 2014 World Cup Qualifier	Japan	8–0	Tajikistan	Osaka, Japan
	Havenaar 11', 47'; Okazaki 19', 74'; Komano 35'; Kagawa 41', 68'; Nakamura 56'	JFA		Stadium: Osaka Nagai Stadium; Attendance: 44,688

2011.11.11 2014 World Cup Qualifier	Tajikistan	0–4	Japan	Dushanbe, Tajikistan
		JFA	=Konno 36'; Okazaki 62', 90'; Maeda 83'	Stadium: Central Stadium; Attendance: 18,000

2011.11.15 2014 World Cup Qualifier	North Korea	1–0	Japan	Pyongyang, North Korea
	Pak Nam-Chol 50'	JFA		Stadium: Kim Il-sung Stadium, (Note: Moved from the original venue at Yanggakdo Stadium due to the poor condition of the pitch.); Attendance: 50,000

=== Players statistics ===
Player	-2010	01.09	01.13	01.17	01.21	01.29	06.01	06.07	08.10	09.02	09.06	10.07	10.11	11.11	11.15	2011	Total	
Yasuhito Endō	100(9)	O	O	O	O	O	O	O	O	O	O	O	-	O	O	-	13(0)	113(9)
Yūichi Komano	60(0)	-	-	-	-	-	-	-	-	O	O	O	O	O(1)	O	O	7(1)	67(1)
Kengo Nakamura	52(5)	-	-	-	-	-	-	-	-	-	-	-	O	O(1)	O	O	4(1)	56(6)
Yuki Abe	50(3)	-	-	-	-	-	-	-	-	O	-	O	O	-	-	-	3(0)	53(3)
Yasuyuki Konno	40(0)	O	O	O	O	O	O	O	O	O	O	O	O	O	O(1)	O	15(1)	55(1)
Makoto Hasebe	37(1)	O	O(1)	O	O	O	O	O	O	O	O	O	O	O	O	O	15(1)	52(2)
Shinji Okazaki	35(18)	O	O	O(3)	O	O	O	O	O	O	O	O(1)	-	O(2)	O(2)	O	14(8)	49(26)
Atsuto Uchida	34(1)	O	O	O	-	O	O	-	O	O	O	O	-	-	O	O	11(0)	45(1)
Yuto Nagatomo	34(3)	O	O	O	O	O	O	O	O	-	-	-	O	O	-	-	10(0)	44(3)
Daisuke Matsui	29(1)	O	O	-	-	-	-	-	-	-	-	-	-	-	-	-	2(0)	31(1)
Keisuke Honda	23(6)	O	O(1)	-	O	O	O	O	O	O(1)	-	-	-	-	-	-	8(2)	31(8)
Shinji Kagawa	17(3)	O	O	O	O(2)	O	-	-	-	O(2)	O	O	O	O(2)	O	-	11(6)	28(9)
Eiji Kawashima	16(0)	O	O	-	O	O	O	O	O	O	O	O	-	O	O	-	12(0)	28(0)
Shinzo Koroki	11(0)	-	-	-	-	-	-	O	-	-	-	-	-	-	-	-	1(0)	12(0)
Ryoichi Maeda	7(2)	O	O	O(2)	O	O(1)	O	O	-	-	-	-	-	-	O(1)	O	9(4)	16(6)
Michihiro Yasuda	6(1)	-	-	-	-	-	-	O	-	-	-	-	-	-	-	-	1(0)	7(1)
Jungo Fujimoto	6(0)	O	-	-	-	-	O	-	-	-	-	-	O	O	-	-	4(0)	10(0)
Yuzo Kurihara	5(0)	-	-	-	-	-	-	O	-	-	-	-	O	-	-	O	3(0)	8(0)
Daiki Iwamasa	4(0)	-	-	O	O	O	O	-	-	-	-	-	-	-	-	-	4(0)	8(0)
Tomoaki Makino	4(0)	-	-	-	-	-	-	-	O	O	-	O	O	-	-	-	4(0)	8(0)
Hajime Hosogai	3(0)	-	O	-	-	O(1)	-	O	-	O	-	-	O	O	-	O	7(1)	10(1)
Shusaku Nishikawa	3(0)	-	O	O	-	-	-	-	-	-	-	-	O	-	-	O	4(0)	7(0)
Maya Yoshida	1(0)	O(1)	O	O	O	-	O	-	O	O	O(1)	O	O	O	O	-	12(2)	13(2)
Yōsuke Kashiwagi	1(0)	-	-	O	-	-	-	-	-	-	O	-	-	-	-	-	2(0)	3(0)
Kunimitsu Sekiguchi	1(0)	-	-	-	-	-	-	O	O	-	-	-	-	-	-	-	2(0)	3(0)
Akihiro Ienaga	1(0)	-	-	-	-	-	-	-	O	O	-	-	-	-	-	-	2(0)	3(0)
Mitsuru Nagata	1(0)	-	-	-	O	-	-	-	-	-	-	-	-	-	-	-	1(0)	2(0)
Tadanari Lee	0(0)	O	-	-	-	-	O(1)	O	O	O	O	O	O(1)	O	-	O	10(2)	10(2)
Masahiko Inoha	0(0)	-	-	O	O(1)	O	O	O	O	-	-	-	O	-	O	O	9(1)	9(1)
Mike Havenaar	0(0)	-	-	-	-	-	-	-	-	-	O	O	-	O(2)	O	O	5(2)	5(2)
Hiroshi Kiyotake	0(0)	-	-	-	-	-	-	-	-	O	O	O	-	-	O	O	5(0)	5(0)
Takuya Honda	0(0)	-	-	O	-	O	-	-	-	-	-	-	-	-	-	-	2(0)	2(0)
Daigo Nishi	0(0)	-	-	-	-	-	-	O	-	-	-	-	-	-	-	-	1(0)	1(0)
Ryota Moriwaki	0(0)	-	-	-	-	-	-	O	-	-	-	-	-	-	-	-	1(0)	1(0)
Genki Haraguchi	0(0)	-	-	-	-	-	-	-	-	-	-	-	O	-	-	-	1(0)	1(0)

=== Goal scorers ===
Place	Position	Name	Friendlies	Asian Cup	Kirin Cup	WC Qualifying	Total
1	FW	Shinji Okazaki	0	0	0	0	8
1	FW	Shinji Kagawa	0	0	0	0	6
1	FW	Ryoichi Maeda	0	0	0	0	4
1	FW	Mike Havenaar	0	0	0	0	2
1	FW	Keisuke Honda	0	0	0	0	2
1	FW	Maya Yoshida	0	0	0	0	2
1	FW	Tadanari Lee	0	0	0	0	2
1	FW	Yasuyuki Konno	0	0	0	0	1
1	FW	Kengo Nakamura	0	0	0	0	1
1	FW	Yūichi Komano	0	0	0	0	1
1	FW	Hajime Hosogai	0	0	0	0	1
1	FW	Masahiko Inoha	0	0	0	0	1
1	FW	Makoto Hasebe	0	0	0	0	1
		TOTALS	34	0	1	1	35

== National team (Women) ==
=== Results ===
2011.03.02	Japan	1–2	United States	Portugal
	Miyama (?)		? (?) ? (?)

2011.03.04	Japan	5–0	Finland	Portugal
	Ono (?); Kawasumi (?); Nagasato (?); Yamaguchi (?)

2011.03.07	Japan	1–0	Norway	Portugal
	Nagasato (?)

2011.03.09	Japan	2–1	Sweden	Portugal
	Kamionobe (?); Kawasumi (?)		? (?)

2011.05.14	Japan	0–2	United States	United States
			? (?) ? (?)

2011.05.18	Japan	0–2	United States	United States
			? (?) ? (?)

2011.06.18	Japan	1–1	South Korea	Ehime, Japan
	Miyama (?)		? (?)	Stadium: Ehime Matsuyama Athletic Stadium

2011.06.27	Japan	2–1	New Zealand	Germany
	Nagasato (?); Miyama (?)		? (?)

2011.07.01	Japan	4–0	Mexico	Germany
	Sawa (?); Ono (?)

2011.07.05	Japan	0–2	England	Germany
			? (?) ? (?)

2011.07.09	Japan	1–0	Germany	Germany
	Maruyama (?)

2011.07.13	Japan	3–1	Sweden	Germany
	Kawasumi (?); Sawa (?)		? (?)

2011.07.17	Japan	2–2 (3–1 p)	United States	Germany
	Miyama (?); Sawa (?)		? (?) ? (?)

2011.09.01	Japan	3–0	Thailand	China
	Kawasumi (?); Tanaka (?) (?)

2011.09.03	Japan	2–1	South Korea	China
	Sakaguchi (?); Ono (?)		? (?)

2011.09.05	Japan	1–0	Australia	China
	Kawasumi (?)

2011.09.08	Japan	1–1	North Korea	China
	(?)		? (?)

2011.09.11	Japan	1–0	China	China
	Tanaka (?)

=== Players statistics ===
Player	-2010	03.02	03.04	03.07	03.09	05.14	05.18	06.18	06.27	07.01	07.05	07.09	07.13	07.17	09.01	09.03	09.05	09.08	09.11	2011	Total
Homare Sawa	161(75)	O	O	O	O	O	O	O	O	O(3)	O	O	O(1)	O(1)	-	O	O	O	-	16(5)	177(80)
Nozomi Yamago	95(0)	-	-	-	O	-	-	-	-	-	-	-	-	-	-	-	-	-	-	1(0)	96(0)
Aya Miyama	86(22)	O(1)	O	O	O	O	O	O(1)	O(1)	O	O	O	O	O(1)	O	O	O	O	O	18(4)	104(26)
Shinobu Ono	80(33)	O	O(1)	O	O	O	O	O	O	O(1)	O	O	O	O	O	O(1)	O	O	-	17(3)	97(36)
Kozue Ando	79(17)	O	O	O	O	O	O	O	O	O	O	O	O	O	O	O	O	O	O	18(0)	97(17)
Eriko Arakawa	69(20)	O	O	-	O	-	-	-	-	-	-	-	-	-	-	-	-	-	-	3(0)	72(20)
Kyoko Yano	65(1)	O	-	O	-	-	-	-	-	-	-	-	-	-	O	-	-	-	O	4(0)	69(1)
Karina Maruyama	60(13)	-	-	-	-	-	O	O	O	-	O	O(1)	-	O	-	-	O	-	O	8(1)	68(14)
Yuki Nagasato	58(29)	O	O(1)	O(1)	O	O	-	O	O(1)	O	O	O	O	O	O	O	O	O	O	17(3)	75(32)
Azusa Iwashimizu	57(8)	O	O	O	O	O	O	O	O	O	O	O	O	O	-	O	O	O	O	17(0)	74(8)
Yukari Kinga	55(4)	O	O	O	O	O	O	O	O	O	O	O	O	O	O	O	O	O	-	17(0)	72(4)
Miho Fukumoto	51(0)	O	-	O	-	-	O	-	-	-	-	-	-	-	O	-	-	-	O	5(0)	56(0)
Rumi Utsugi	38(5)	O	O	O	-	O	O	-	-	O	-	O	-	-	O	-	-	-	O	9(0)	47(5)
Mizuho Sakaguchi	33(15)	O	O	-	-	O	O	O	O	O	O	O	O	O	-	O(1)	O	O	-	14(1)	47(16)
Aya Sameshima	20(2)	O	O	O	O	O	O	O	O	O	O	O	O	O	O	O	O	O	O	18(0)	38(2)
Saki Kumagai	17(0)	O	O	-	O	O	O	O	O	O	O	O	O	O	O	O	O	O	-	16(0)	33(0)
Mami Yamaguchi	16(6)	-	O(2)	O	-	-	-	-	-	-	-	-	-	-	-	-	-	-	-	2(2)	18(8)
Ayumi Kaihori	13(0)	-	O	O	-	O	O	O	O	O	O	O	O	O	-	O	O	O	-	14(0)	27(0)
Megumi Takase	12(4)	O	-	O	O	O	-	-	-	-	-	-	O	-	O	-	-	-	O	7(0)	19(4)
Megumi Kamionobe	11(1)	-	O	-	O(1)	-	-	-	-	-	-	-	O	-	O	O	-	-	O	6(1)	17(2)
Nahomi Kawasumi	10(0)	O	O(1)	-	O(1)	-	O	-	-	O	O	-	O(2)	O	O(1)	O	O(1)	O	O	13(6)	23(6)
Mana Iwabuchi	3(2)	-	-	-	-	O	O	O	O	O	O	O	-	O	-	-	-	-	-	8(0)	11(2)
Asano Nagasato	3(0)	-	-	-	-	-	-	-	-	-	-	-	-	-	-	-	-	-	O	1(0)	4(0)
Maiko Nasu	2(0)	-	-	-	-	-	O	-	-	-	-	-	-	-	-	-	-	-	-	1(0)	3(0)
Asuna Tanaka	0(0)	-	O	-	O	-	-	O	O	-	-	-	-	-	O(1)	-	-	-	O(1)	6(2)	6(2)
Emi Nakajima	0(0)	-	-	-	-	O	O	-	-	-	-	-	-	-	-	-	-	-	-	2(0)	2(0)
Akane Saito	0(0)	-	-	-	O	-	-	-	-	-	-	-	-	-	-	-	-	-	-	1(0)	1(0)
Yuki Sakai	0(0)	-	-	-	O	-	-	-	-	-	-	-	-	-	-	-	-	-	-	1(0)	1(0)
