= Naoya Kondo =

Japanese footballer (born 1983)

Naoya Kondo 近藤 直也
Personal information
- Full name: Naoya Kondo
- Date of birth: 3 October 1983 (age 43)
- Place of birth: Utsunomiya, Tochigi, Japan
- Height: 1.82 m (6 ft 0 in)
- Position: Defender

Youth career
- 1990–1995: Takezono Nishi FC
- 1996–1998: Takezono Higashi Junior High School
- 1999–2001: Kashiwa Reysol

Senior career*
Years	Team	Apps	(Gls)
2002–2015	Kashiwa Reysol	246	(11)
2016–2018	JEF United Chiba	110	(8)
2019–2020	Tokyo Verdy	45	(1)
Total		401	(20)

International career
2003	Japan U-20	3	(0)
2012	Japan	1	(0)
Medal record
Kashiwa Reysol
Winner	J1 League	2011
Winner	J.League Cup	2013
Winner	Emperor's Cup	2012
Runner-up	Emperor's Cup	2008
- * Club domestic league appearances and goals as of 19 December 2020

Naoya Kondo (近藤 直也, Kondo Naoya; born 3 October 1983) is a Japanese former professional footballer who played as a defender for Kashiwa Reysol, JEF United Chiba and Tokyo Verdy. He also made one appearance for the Japan national football team.

== Club career ==
Kondo was born in Utsunomiya on 3 October 1983. He joined J1 League club Kashiwa Reysol from the youth team in 2002. He got an opportunity to play in 2003 and became a regular center back in 2004. However he could not play many matches for repeated injuries from 2005. He became a regular player again in summer 2009. However Reysol was relegated J2 League end of 2009 season. In 2010, he played all 34 matches except 2 matches for suspension. Reysol also won the champions in J2 League and was returned to J1 in a year. In 2011, Reysol won the champions in J1 League. He was also selected Best Eleven award. From 2012, Reysol won the champions in 2012 Emperor's Cup and 2013 J.League Cup. However his opportunity to play decreased from 2014. In 2016, he moved to Chiba Prefecture's cross town rivals, JEF United Chiba in J2 League. He played as regular center back in 3 seasons. In 2019, he moved to J2 club Tokyo Verdy.

Kondo retired from professional football in December 2020.

== National team career ==
Kondo was a member of Japan U-20 national football team for 2003 World Youth Championship held in United Arab Emirates.

On 24 February 2012, Kondo debuted for Japan national team against Iceland.

== Club statistics ==
Appearances and goals by club, season and competition
Club performance			League		Cup		League Cup		Continental		Other		Total	
Season	Club	League	Apps	Goals	Apps	Goals	Apps	Goals	Apps	Goals	Apps	Goals	Apps	Goals
Japan			League		Emperor's Cup		J.League Cup		AFC		Other^{1}		Total	
2002	Kashiwa Reysol	J1 League	0	0	0	0	0	0	–		–		0	0
2003	Kashiwa Reysol	J1 League	15	1	0	0	2	0	–		–		17	1
2004	Kashiwa Reysol	J1 League	26	1	1	0	5	0	–		2	0	34	1
2005	Kashiwa Reysol	J1 League	12	0	0	0	4	0	–		–		16	0
2006	Kashiwa Reysol	J2 League	3	0	2	0	–		–		–		5	0
2007	Kashiwa Reysol	J1 League	16	1	1	0	2	0	–		–		19	1
2008	Kashiwa Reysol	J1 League	5	0	0	0	3	0	–		–		8	0
2009	Kashiwa Reysol	J1 League	22	0	2	0	2	0	–		–		26	0
2010	Kashiwa Reysol	J2 League	34	3	3	1	–		–		–		37	4
2011	Kashiwa Reysol	J1 League	31	1	3	0	2	0	–		–		36	1
2012	Kashiwa Reysol	J1 League	26	2	5	0	4	0	4	0	1	0	40	2
2013	Kashiwa Reysol	J1 League	31	2	2	0	5	0	11	1	1	0	50	3
2014	Kashiwa Reysol	J1 League	18	0	1	0	7	0	–		–		26	0
2015	Kashiwa Reysol	J1 League	7	0	0	0	1	0	1	0	–		9	0
Total			246	11	20	0	37	0	16	1	4	0	323	12
2016	JEF United Chiba	J2 League	35	2	0	0	–		–		–		35	2
2017	JEF United Chiba	J2 League	38	4	1	0	–		–		1	0	39	4
2018	JEF United Chiba	J2 League	37	2	0	0	–		–		–		37	2
Total			110	8	1	0	–		–		1	0	112	8
2019	Tokyo Verdy	J2 League	28	0	1	0	–		–		–		29	0
2020	Tokyo Verdy	J2 League	17	1	0	0	–		–		–		17	1
Total			45	1	1	0	0	0	0	0	0	0	46	1
Career total			401	20	22	1	37	0	16	1	5	0	480	22

^{1}Includes Japanese Super Cup.

== National team statistics ==
Japan national team
Year	Apps	Goals
2012	1	0
Total	1	0

== Honours ==
=== Club ===
Kashiwa Reysol

- J1 League (1) : 2011
- J2 League (1) : 2010
- Emperor's Cup (1) : 2012
- Japanese Super Cup (1) : 2012
- J.League Cup (1) : 2013

=== Individual ===
- J.League Best XI (1) : 2011
