= Hidekazu Otani =

Japanese footballer

Hidekazu Otani 大谷 秀和
Personal information
- Full name: Hidekazu Otani
- Date of birth: 6 November 1984 (age 42)
- Place of birth: Nagareyama, Chiba, Japan
- Height: 1.74 m (5 ft 9 in)
- Position: Defensive midfielder

Team information
- Current team: Kashiwa Reysol (Assistant Manager)

Youth career
- 2000–2002: Kashiwa Reysol

Senior career*
Years	Team	Apps	(Gls)
2003–2022	Kashiwa Reysol	478	(23)
Total		478	(23)

Managerial career
- 2023–: Kashiwa Reysol (assistant)
Medal record
Kashiwa Reysol
Winner	J1 League	2011
Winner	J.League Cup	2013
Winner	Emperor's Cup	2012
Runner-up	Emperor's Cup	2008
- * Club domestic league appearances and goals as of 5 November 2022

Hidekazu Otani (大谷 秀和, Otani Hidekazu; born 6 November 1984) is a Japanese football manager and former professional player who played as a defensive midfielder. He made over 600 career appearances for Kashiwa Reysol and stayed with them for his entire career. He is the currently coach for J1 League club Kashiwa Reysol.

== Playing career ==
Otani was born in Nagareyama on 6 November 1984. He joined J1 League club Kashiwa Reysol from youth team in 2003. He debuted in 2003 and played many matches as defensive midfielder from 2004. Although he became a regular player summer 2005, Reysol was relegated to J2 League end of 2005 season. In 2006, he played many matches as left side back and left side midfielder and was promoted to J1 in a year. From 2007, he played as regular left side back.

From Summer 2009, he was returned to his original position, defensive midfielder under new manager Nelsinho Baptista and played as regular defensive midfielder for a long time. Reysol also won the 2nd place in 2008 Emperor's Cup. However the club results were sluggish and was relegated to J2 end of 2009 season again. Reysol won the champions in 2010 season and was returned to J1 in a year. In 2011, Reysol won the champions in J1 League first time in the club history.

From 2012, Reysol won the champions in 2012 Emperor's Cup and 2013 J.League Cup.

== Career statistics ==
Appearances and goals by club, season and competition
Club	Season	League			Emperor's Cup		J.League Cup		Asia		Other		Total	
Club	Season	Division	Apps	Goals	Apps	Goals	Apps	Goals	Apps	Goals	Apps	Goals	Apps	Goals
Kashiwa Reysol	2003	J1 League	4	0	–		5	0	–		–		9	0
Kashiwa Reysol	2004	J1 League	16	1	1	0	4	1	–		–		21	2
Kashiwa Reysol	2005	J1 League	20	3	2	2	2	0	–		2	0	26	5
Kashiwa Reysol	2006	J2 League	29	1	–		–		–		–		29	1
Kashiwa Reysol	2007	J1 League	31	0	1	0	2	0	–		–		34	0
Kashiwa Reysol	2008	J1 League	33	3	4	0	5	0	–		–		42	3
Kashiwa Reysol	2009	J1 League	20	1	2	0	3	0	–		–		25	1
Kashiwa Reysol	2010	J2 League	35	2	3	0	–		–		–		38	2
Kashiwa Reysol	2011	J1 League	28	0	3	0	2	0	–		4	0	33	0
Kashiwa Reysol	2012	J1 League	31	1	6	0	4	0	6	0	1	0	48	1
Kashiwa Reysol	2013	J1 League	31	0	2	0	4	0	9	0	1	0	47	0
Kashiwa Reysol	2014	J1 League	30	0	2	1	10	0	–		1	0	43	1
Kashiwa Reysol	2015	J1 League	31	2	3	0	–		9	1	1	0	43	3
Kashiwa Reysol	2016	J1 League	20	1	2	0	4	0	–		–		26	2
Kashiwa Reysol	2017	J1 League	32	5	3	0	–		–		–		35	5
Kashiwa Reysol	2018	J1 League	25	0	2	0	3	1	6	0	–		36	1
Kashiwa Reysol	2019	J2 League	30	0	1	0	1	0	–		–		32	0
Kashiwa Reysol	2020	J1 League	23	2	–		3	0	–		–		26	2
Kashiwa Reysol	2021	J1 League	6	1	1	0	1	0	–		–		8	0
Kashiwa Reysol	2022	J1 League	4	0	–		3	0	–		–		7	0
Career total			478	23	38	3	56	2	30	1	8	0	610	29

== Honours ==
Kashiwa Reysol

- J.League Division 1: 2011
- J.League Division 2: 2010, 2019
- J.League Cup: 2013
- Emperor's Cup: 2012
- Japanese Super Cup: 2012
- Suruga Bank Championship: 2014
