= Hiroki Akino =

Japanese footballer (born 1994)

Hiroki Akino 秋野 央樹
Personal information
- Full name: Hiroki Akino
- Date of birth: 8 October 1994 (age 32)
- Place of birth: Inzai, Chiba, Japan
- Height: 1.76 m (5 ft 9 in)
- Position: Midfielder

Team information
- Current team: Avispa Fukuoka
- Number: 15

Youth career
- 2004–2012: Kashiwa Reysol

Senior career*
Years	Team	Apps	(Gls)
2013–2018	Kashiwa Reysol	48	(1)
2014–2015	→J. League U-22(loan)	11	(0)
2017–2018	→Shonan Bellmare (loan)	58	(4)
2019	Shonan Bellmare	4	(0)
2019	→V-Varen Nagasaki (loan)	17	(0)
2020–2024	V-Varen Nagasaki	104	(0)
2025–	Avispa Fukuoka	22	(0)

International career^{‡}
2009–2011	Japan U17	9	(2)
2014	Japan U23	3	(0)
Medal record
Kashiwa Reysol
Winner	J.League Cup	2013
Shonan Bellmare
Winner	J.League Cup	2018
- * Club domestic league appearances and goals as of 12 August 2026 ‡ National team caps and goals as of 18:48, 25 October 2023

Hiroki Akino (秋野 央樹, Akino Hiroki; born October 8, 1994, in Inzai, Chiba) is a Japanese footballer who plays midfielder and currently play for J1 League club, Avispa Fukuoka.

== Career ==
=== Kashiwa Reysol ===
Akino made his debut for Kashiwa Reysol in the J. League Division 1 on 16 March 2013 against Vegalta Sendai in which he came on as an 87th-minute substitute for Kenta Kano as Reysol lost the match 2–1. He scored his first goal for Kashiwa against Júbilo Iwata on 12 March 2016, in the 55th minute.

=== Loan to Shonan Bellmare ===
During his loan spell, Akino made his league debut for the club against Mito HollyHock on 26 February 2017. He scored his first goal for Shonan against Tokyo Verdy on 16 July 2017, in the 78th minute.

=== Shonan Bellmare ===
Akino made his league debut for Shonan against Vegalta Sendai on 17 March 2019.

=== Loan to V-Varen Nagasaki ===
During his loan spell with the club, Akino made his debut for V-Varen against Ehime FC on 31 July 2019.

=== V-Varen Nagasaki ===
Akino made his league debut for V-Varen against Tochigi SC on 23 February 2020.

Ahead of the 2024 J2 League season, he was appointed captain.

=== Avispa Fukuoka ===
On 23 December 2024, Akino was announced at J1 club Avispa Fukuoka from the 2025 season.

== International career ==
Akino was part of the Japanese u17 team that went to the 2011 FIFA U-17 World Cup. On 24 June 2011 in Japan's final group-stage match against Argentina U17's, Akino scored the final goal for Japan in the 74th minute as Japan's under-17's went on to win the match 3–1 and top the group with seven points before going out in the quarter-finals to Brazil's under-17's.

Akino was also called up to the 2014 Asian Games with the Japan U23s, making his debut against Nepal U23s.

== Career statistics ==
=== Club ===
As of the start for 2025 season.

Club	Season	League			Emperor's Cup		J. League Cup		AFC		Total	
Club	Season	Division	Apps	Goals	Apps	Goals	Apps	Goals	Apps	Goals	Apps	Goals
Kashiwa Reysol	2013	J.League Div 1	2	0	2	0	0	0	1	0	5	0
Kashiwa Reysol	2014	J.League Div 1	7	0	0	0	1	0	–		8	0
Kashiwa Reysol	2015	J1 League	16	0	2	0	1	0	2	0	21	0
Kashiwa Reysol	2016	J1 League	23	1	1	0	0	0	–		24	1
Shonan Bellmare (loan)	2017	J2 League	38	4	1	0	–		–		39	4
Shonan Bellmare (loan)	2018	J1 League	20	0	1	0	4	0	–		25	0
Shonan Bellmare	2019	J1 League	4	0	1	0	6	0	–		11	0
V-Varen Nagasaki (loan)	2019	J2 League	17	0	–						17	0
V-Varen Nagasaki	2020	J2 League	40	0	–						40	0
V-Varen Nagasaki	2021	J2 League	13	0	0	0	–				13	0
V-Varen Nagasaki	2022	J2 League	1	0	2	0	–				3	0
V-Varen Nagasaki	2023	J2 League	14	0	0	0	–				14	0
V-Varen Nagasaki	2024	J2 League	36	0	0	0	2	0	–		38	0
Avispa Fukuoka	2025	J1 League	0	0	0	0	0	0	–		0	0
Career Total			131	5	10	0	14	0	3	0	158	5
