= Daisuke Suzuki (footballer) =

Japanese footballer

Daisuke Suzuki 鈴木 大輔
Personal information
- Full name: Daisuke Suzuki
- Date of birth: 29 January 1990 (age 36)
- Place of birth: Tokyo, Japan
- Height: 1.81 m (5 ft 11 in)
- Position: Centre back

Team information
- Current team: JEF United Chiba
- Number: 13

Youth career
- 2002–2004: Teihens
- 2005–2007: Seiryo High School

Senior career*
Years	Team	Apps	(Gls)
2008–2012	Albirex Niigata	57	(1)
2013–2015	Kashiwa Reysol	89	(7)
2016–2018	Gimnàstic	69	(1)
2018	Kashiwa Reysol	9	(1)
2019–2020	Urawa Red Diamonds	20	(0)
2021–	JEF United Chiba	151	(14)

International career^{‡}
2007	Japan U-17	2	(0)
2012	Japan U-23	6	(0)
2013–2014	Japan	2	(0)
Medal record
Kashiwa Reysol
Winner	J.League Cup	2013
Representing Japan
Asian Games
Gold medal – first place	2010 Guangzhou	Team
- * Club domestic league appearances and goals as of 12 August 2026 ‡ National team caps and goals as of 13 August 2012

Daisuke Suzuki (鈴木 大輔, Suzuki Daisuke; born 29 January 1990) is a Japanese footballer who plays as a central defender and captain for J1 League club, JEF United Chiba. He represented his country at the 2012 Summer Olympics.

== Club career ==
Suzuki joined Albirex Niigata as an apprentice professional in 2007. He turned full-time professional with Albirex at the start of the 2008 season and made his first team debut against Nara Club in the second round of the Emperor's Cup. His first J. League appearance was in the 2–1 away win over Vissel Kobe on 1 May 2010.

He made 24 appearances during the 2010 season, scoring his first goal against Urawa Red Diamonds at Saitama Stadium on 28 May 2011.

In January 2016, he announced the departure from Kashiwa Reysol after three seasons to look for new opportunities for his career. On 16 February, he signed for Spanish Segunda División club Gimnàstic de Tarragona.

On 9 September 2018, Suzuki return to former club, Kashiwa Reysol for mid 2018 season. He return to club since leaving in 2015.

On 19 December 2018, Suzuki signed to fellow J1 club, Urawa Red Diamonds from 2019 season.

On 28 December 2020, Suzuki joined to J2 club, JEF United Chiba from 2021 season. On 13 December 2025, Suzuki was brought his club promotion to J1 League from next season after defeat Tokushima Vortis with narrowly 1–0 in Promotion play-off final at Fukuda Denshi Arena and return to top tier after 16 years absence.

== International career ==
In 2007, Suzuki received a call-up to the Japan U-17 national team squad for the 2007 U-17 World Cup. He played 2 matches. He was then also selected as part of the Japan U-23 national team for the 2010 Asian Games and 2012 Summer Olympics. He played all 6 matches as center back with Maya Yoshida and Japan won the 4th place.

In July 2013, Suzuki was elected Japan national team for 2013 East Asian Cup. At this tournament, on 25 July, he debuted against Australia. He played 2 games for Japan until 2014.

== Career statistics ==
=== Club ===
As of the start from 2026–27 season.

Club	Season	League			National Cup		League Cup		Continental		Other^{1}		Total	
Club	Season	Division	Apps	Goals	Apps	Goals	Apps	Goals	Apps	Goals	Apps	Goals	Apps	Goals
Albirex Niigata	2008	J.League Div 1	0	0	0	0	0	0	-		-		0	0
Albirex Niigata	2009	J.League Div 1	0	0	1	0	0	0	-		-		1	0
Albirex Niigata	2010	J.League Div 1	5	0	2	1	1	1	-		-		8	2
Albirex Niigata	2011	J.League Div 1	24	1	1	0	3	0	-		-		28	1
Albirex Niigata	2012	J.League Div 1	28	0	0	0	4	0	-		-		32	0
Albirex Niigata	Total		57	1	4	1	8	1	0	0	0	0	69	3
Kashiwa Reysol	2013	J.League Div 1	23	1	2	0	3	0	9	0	1	0	38	1
Kashiwa Reysol	2014	J.League Div 1	32	3	2	0	8	0	-		-		42	3
Kashiwa Reysol	2015	J1 League	34	3	2	0	1	0	9	0	-		46	3
Kashiwa Reysol	Total		89	7	6	0	12	0	18	0	1	0	126	7
Gimnàstic	2015–16	Segunda Division	15	0	0	0	-		-		0	0	15	0
Gimnàstic	2016–17	Segunda Division	34	1	2	0	-		-		-		36	1
Gimnàstic	2017–18	Segunda Division	20	0	1	0	-		-		-		21	0
Gimnàstic	Total		69	1	3	0	0	0	0	0	0	0	71	1
Kashiwa Reysol	2018	J1 League	9	1	0	0	2	0	-		-		11	1
Urawa Red Diamonds	2019	J1 League	15	0	2	1	1	0	10	0	0	0	28	1
Urawa Red Diamonds	2020	J1 League	5	0	-		1	0	-		-		6	0
Urawa Red Diamonds	Total		20	0	2	1	2	0	10	0	0	0	34	1
JEF United Chiba	2021	J2 League	41	3	1	0	-		-		-		42	3
JEF United Chiba	2022	J2 League	20	2	1	0	-		-		-		21	2
JEF United Chiba	2023	J2 League	40	4	1	0	-		-		1	0	42	4
JEF United Chiba	2024	J2 League	14	3	1	0	-		-		-		15	3
JEF United Chiba	2025	J2 League	30	2	1	0	-		-		2	0	33	2
JEF United Chiba	2026–27	J1 League	0	0	0	0	0	0	-		-		0	0
JEF United Chiba	Total		145	14	5	0	0	0	0	0	3	0	153	14
Career total			380	24	19	2	24	1	28	0	4	0	455	27

^{1}Includes Japanese Super Cup.

^{2}Includes J1 Promotion play-off.

=== National team ===
Japan national team
Year	Apps	Goals
2013	1	0
2014	1	0
Total	2	0

== Honours ==
=== Club ===
Kashiwa Reysol

- J. League Cup：2013
- Suruga Bank Championship：2014

=== International ===
Japan U21

- Asian Games: 2010

Japan

- EAFF East Asian Cup：2013

=== Individual ===
- AFC Champions League Dream team：2013
