= 2017 JEF United Chiba season =

JEF United Chiba
2017 season
- Manager: Juan Esnáider
- Stadium: Fukuda Denshi Arena
- J2 League: 6th

2017 JEF United Chiba season.

== J2 League ==
=== League table ===
Pos	Team	Pld	W	D	L	GF	GA	GD	Pts	Promotion, qualification or relegation
5	Tokyo Verdy	42	20	10	12	64	49	+15	70	Qualification for promotion playoffs (Note: Only teams that meet J1 license criteria can participate in promotion playoffs. If one or more teams fail to meet the criteria, only eligible teams that finished 3rd to 6th will participate and no replacement teams will be added.)
6	JEF United Chiba	42	20	8	14	70	58	+12	68	Qualification for promotion playoffs
7	Tokushima Vortis	42	18	13	11	71	45	+26	67	

Updated to match(es) played on 28 November 2017. Source: 2017 MEIJI YASUDA J2 LEAGUE League table
Rules for classification: 1) Points; 2) Goal difference; 3) Goals scored

=== Match details ===
J2 League match details
Match	Date	Team	Score	Team	Venue	Attendance
1	2017.02.26	FC Machida Zelvia	0-1	JEF United Chiba	Machida Stadium	8,124
2	2017.03.04	JEF United Chiba	1-1	Montedio Yamagata	Fukuda Denshi Arena	11,807
3	2017.03.11	JEF United Chiba	2-0	Nagoya Grampus	Fukuda Denshi Arena	13,877
4	2017.03.19	Matsumoto Yamaga FC	3-1	JEF United Chiba	Matsumotodaira Park Stadium	15,688
5	2017.03.25	Shonan Bellmare	2-0	JEF United Chiba	Shonan BMW Stadium Hiratsuka	10,211
6	2017.04.01	JEF United Chiba	2-2	Kyoto Sanga FC	Fukuda Denshi Arena	7,716
7	2017.04.08	JEF United Chiba	1-1	Thespakusatsu Gunma	Fukuda Denshi Arena	7,361
8	2017.04.15	Renofa Yamaguchi FC	0-1	JEF United Chiba	Ishin Memorial Park Stadium	4,287
9	2017.04.22	Yokohama FC	4-0	JEF United Chiba	NHK Spring Mitsuzawa Football Stadium	5,367
10	2017.04.29	JEF United Chiba	2-0	Tokushima Vortis	Fukuda Denshi Arena	9,077
11	2017.05.03	Kamatamare Sanuki	1-1	JEF United Chiba	Pikara Stadium	3,867
12	2017.05.07	Zweigen Kanazawa	2-1	JEF United Chiba	Ishikawa Athletics Stadium	4,490
13	2017.05.13	JEF United Chiba	5-0	V-Varen Nagasaki	Fukuda Denshi Arena	6,230
14	2017.05.17	Tokyo Verdy	3-0	JEF United Chiba	Ajinomoto Stadium	4,436
15	2017.05.21	JEF United Chiba	1-1	Roasso Kumamoto	Fukuda Denshi Arena	10,068
16	2017.05.27	JEF United Chiba	4-2	Ehime FC	Fukuda Denshi Arena	7,647
17	2017.06.03	Fagiano Okayama	2-1	JEF United Chiba	City Light Stadium	9,644
18	2017.06.10	JEF United Chiba	0-0	Avispa Fukuoka	Fukuda Denshi Arena	10,497
19	2017.06.17	Mito HollyHock	3-1	JEF United Chiba	K's denki Stadium Mito	5,666
20	2017.06.25	FC Gifu	4-6	JEF United Chiba	Gifu Nagaragawa Stadium	4,521
21	2017.07.01	JEF United Chiba	4-1	Oita Trinita	Fukuda Denshi Arena	9,298
22	2017.07.08	JEF United Chiba	4-3	Kamatamare Sanuki	Fukuda Denshi Arena	9,498
23	2017.07.16	Roasso Kumamoto	1-0	JEF United Chiba	Egao Kenko Stadium	5,692
24	2017.07.22	JEF United Chiba	2-0	Zweigen Kanazawa	Fukuda Denshi Arena	9,799
25	2017.07.29	Ehime FC	1-0	JEF United Chiba	Ningineer Stadium	3,908
26	2017.08.05	Tokushima Vortis	0-1	JEF United Chiba	Pocarisweat Stadium	4,678
27	2017.08.11	JEF United Chiba	2-1	Renofa Yamaguchi FC	Fukuda Denshi Arena	11,550
28	2017.08.16	JEF United Chiba	0-1	Shonan Bellmare	Fukuda Denshi Arena	12,485
29	2017.08.20	Montedio Yamagata	2-2	JEF United Chiba	ND Soft Stadium Yamagata	7,044
30	2017.08.26	JEF United Chiba	1-3	FC Gifu	Fukuda Denshi Arena	7,900
31	2017.09.02	JEF United Chiba	2-2	Tokyo Verdy	Fukuda Denshi Arena	9,996
32	2017.09.10	Thespakusatsu Gunma	2-0	JEF United Chiba	Shoda Shoyu Stadium Gunma	4,448
33	2017.09.16	JEF United Chiba	2-1	Mito HollyHock	Fukuda Denshi Arena	7,334
34	2017.09.24	V-Varen Nagasaki	2-1	JEF United Chiba	Transcosmos Stadium Nagasaki	5,602
35	2017.09.30	Kyoto Sanga FC	2-0	JEF United Chiba	Kyoto Nishikyogoku Athletic Stadium	6,604
36	2017.10.07	JEF United Chiba	3-1	Fagiano Okayama	Fukuda Denshi Arena	8,708
37	2017.10.14	JEF United Chiba	5-1	Matsumoto Yamaga FC	Fukuda Denshi Arena	11,743
38	2017.10.22	Avispa Fukuoka	0-1	JEF United Chiba	Level5 Stadium	10,490
39	2017.10.28	Oita Trinita	1-2	JEF United Chiba	Oita Bank Dome	7,356
40	2017.11.05	JEF United Chiba	2-1	FC Machida Zelvia	Fukuda Denshi Arena	11,052
41	2017.11.11	Nagoya Grampus	0-3	JEF United Chiba	Toyota Stadium	28,697
42	2017.11.19	JEF United Chiba	2-1	Yokohama FC	Fukuda Denshi Arena	15,994
