= Yu Kimura (footballer) =

Japanese footballer

Yu Kimura 木村 裕
Personal information
- Full name: Yu Kimura
- Date of birth: 3 June 1994 (age 32)
- Place of birth: Kashiwa, Chiba, Japan
- Height: 1.75 m (5 ft 9 in)
- Position: Forward

Youth career
- 2004–2012: Kashiwa Reysol Youth

Senior career*
Years	Team	Apps	(Gls)
2013–2016	Kashiwa Reysol	11	(0)
2014	→ J. League U-22 (loan)	3	(1)
2015–2016	→ V-Varen Nagasaki (loan)	51	(5)
2017–2018	V-Varen Nagasaki	18	(5)
2018	→ Kataller Toyama (loan)	14	(1)
2019–2020	Nagano Parceiro	26	(1)
Total		123	(13)
Medal record
Kashiwa Reysol
Winner	J.League Cup	2013
- * Club domestic league appearances and goals as of 21:25, 1 December 2023 (UTC)

Yu Kimura (木村 裕, Kimura Yū; born 3 June 1994) is a Japanese former professional footballer who played as a forward.

== Youth career ==
On 4 August 2012, Kimura scored the winning goal against Yokohama F. Marinos youth to win the championship.

== Career ==
=== Kashiwa Reysol ===
Kimura made his debut for Kashiwa against Ventforet Kofu on 13 April 2013.

=== Loan to V-Varen Nagasaki ===
Yu made his debut for V-Varen against JEF United on 8 March 2015. He scored his first goal for the club against Hokkaido Consadole Sapporo on 15 March 2015, scoring the only goal in the 20th minute. On 11 April 2015, Kimura scored V-Varen's 100th goal in the J2 League.

=== V-Varen Nagasaki ===
On 29 December 2016, Kimura was announced at V-Varen Nagasaki.

=== Loan to Kataller Toyama ===
On 19 June 2018, Kimura was announced at Kataller Toyama. He scored on his debut for Kataller against Thespakusatsu Gunma on 1 July 2018, scoring the only goal in the 86th minute.

=== Nagano Parceiro ===
On 21 December 2018, Kimura was announced at Nagano Parceiro. He made his debut for Nagano against Roasso Kumamoto on 10 March 2019. Kimura scored his first goal for the club against Thespakusatsu Gunma on 31 August 2019, scoring in the 82nd minute.

On 17 December 2020, Kimura announced his retirement.

== Club statistics ==
Updated to 23 February 2018.

Club	Season	League		Emperor's Cup		J. League Cup		AFC		Other^{1}		Total	
Club	Season	Apps	Goals	Apps	Goals	Apps	Goals	Apps	Goals	Apps	Goals	Apps	Goals
Kashiwa Reysol	2013	3	0	0	0	0	0	1	0	0	0	4	0
Kashiwa Reysol	2014	8	0	1	0	0	0	–		–		9	0
V-Varen Nagasaki	2015	26	4	1	0	–		–		1	0	28	4
V-Varen Nagasaki	2016	24	1	2	3	–		–		–		26	4
V-Varen Nagasaki	2017	18	5	0	0	–		–		–		18	5
Career total		79	10	4	3	0	0	1	0	1	0	85	13

^{1}Includes Japanese Super Cup.

== Honours ==
Kashiwa Reysol

- Emperor's Cup (1): 2012
- J. League Cup (1): 2013
