= Kazushige Kirihata =

Japanese footballer (born 1987)

Kazushige Kirihata 桐畑 和繁
Personal information
- Full name: Kazushige Kirihata
- Date of birth: 30 June 1987 (age 39)
- Place of birth: Kōfu, Yamanashi, Japan
- Height: 1.87 m (6 ft 2 in)
- Position: Goalkeeper

Youth career
- 2003–2005: Kashiwa Reysol

Senior career*
Years	Team	Apps	(Gls)
2006–2022	Kashiwa Reysol	51	(0)
2021–2022	→ FC Gifu (loan)	38	(0)
Medal record
Kashiwa Reysol
Winner	J1 League	2011
Winner	J.League Cup	2013
Winner	Emperor's Cup	2012
Runner-up	Emperor's Cup	2008
Representing Japan
AFC U-19 Championship
Silver medal – second place	2006 India
- * Club domestic league appearances and goals as of 31 December 2022, 23:59 (UTC)

Kazushige Kirihata (桐畑 和繁, Kirihata Kazushige; born June 30, 1987) is a Japanese former footballer who played as a goalkeeper. He started his career with Kashiwa Reysol and played the majority of his career for the club, before spending two years on loan at FC Gifu. He retired in January 2023 after a 16 year professional career and took up a coaching role with Criacao Shinjuku.

== National team career ==
In July 2007, Kirihata was called up to the Japan U-20 national team for the 2007 U-20 World Cup but did not play in any of the matches.

== Club statistics ==
Appearances and goals by club, season and competition
Club performance			League		Cup		League Cup		Continental		Other		Total	
Season	Club	League	Apps	Goals	Apps	Goals	Apps	Goals	Apps	Goals	Apps	Goals	Apps	Goals
Japan			League		Emperor's Cup		J.League Cup		AFC		Other^{1}		Total	
2006	Kashiwa Reysol	J2 League	0	0	0	0	-		-		-		0	0
2007	Kashiwa Reysol	J1 League	0	0	0	0	0	0	-		-		0	0
2008	Kashiwa Reysol	J1 League	0	0	0	0	0	0	-		-		0	0
2009	Kashiwa Reysol	J1 League	0	0	0	0	0	0	-		-		0	0
2010	Kashiwa Reysol	J2 League	2	0	0	0	-		-		-		2	0
2011	Kashiwa Reysol	J1 League	8	0	0	0	0	0	-		0	0	8	0
2012	Kashiwa Reysol	J1 League	0	0	0	0	0	0	0	0	0	0	0	0
2013	Kashiwa Reysol	J1 League	0	0	0	0	0	0	0	0	-		0	0
2014	Kashiwa Reysol	J1 League	11	0	0	0	2	0	-		0	0	13	0
2015	Kashiwa Reysol	J1 League	5	0	0	0	1	0	0	0	-		6	0
2016	Kashiwa Reysol	J1 League	6	0	0	0	5	0	–		–		11	0
2017	Kashiwa Reysol	J1 League	0	0	1	0	6	0	–		–		7	0
2018	Kashiwa Reysol	J1 League	18	0	2	0	0	0	2	0	–		22	0
2019	Kashiwa Reysol	J2 League	1	0	0	0	4	0	–		–		5	0
2020	Kashiwa Reysol	J1 League	0	0	0	0	0	0	–		–		0	0
Total			51	0	3	0	18	0	2	0	-		74	0
2021	FC Gifu (loan)	J3 League	19	0	1	0	-		-		-		20	0
2021	FC Gifu (loan)	J3 League	19	0	0	0	-		-		-		19	0
Total			38	0	1	0	0	0	0	0	-		39	0
Career Total			89	0	4	0	18	0	2	0	0	0	113	0

^{1}Includes Japanese Super Cup, Suruga Bank Championship and FIFA Club World Cup.
