= 2015 Kashiwa Reysol season =

Kashiwa Reysol
2015 season
- Manager: Tatsuma Yoshida
- Stadium: Hitachi Kashiwa Stadium
- J1 League: 10th

2015 Kashiwa Reysol season.

== J1 League ==
=== League table ===
Pos	Team	Pld	W	D	L	GF	GA	GD	Pts
9	Nagoya Grampus	34	13	7	14	44	48	−4	46
10	Kashiwa Reysol	34	12	9	13	46	43	+3	45
11	Sagan Tosu	34	9	13	12	37	54	−17	40

Updated to match(es) played on 28 November 2015. Source: Meiji Yasuda J1 League Standings
Rules for classification: 1) Points; 2) Goal difference; 3) Goals scored

=== Match details ===
J1 League match details
Match	Date	Team	Score	Team	Venue	Attendance
1-1	2015.03.07	Vissel Kobe	0-1	Kashiwa Reysol	Noevir Stadium Kobe	24,027
1-2	2015.03.13	Kashiwa Reysol	1-1	Vegalta Sendai	Hitachi Kashiwa Stadium	9,082
1-3	2015.03.22	Albirex Niigata	3-2	Kashiwa Reysol	Denka Big Swan Stadium	18,193
1-4	2015.04.04	Kashiwa Reysol	1-2	Yokohama F. Marinos	Hitachi Kashiwa Stadium	12,378
1-5	2015.04.12	Matsumoto Yamaga FC	1-3	Kashiwa Reysol	Matsumotodaira Park Stadium	18,514
1-6	2015.04.16	Kashiwa Reysol	1-3	Kashima Antlers	Hitachi Kashiwa Stadium	10,076
1-7	2015.04.25	Sagan Tosu	1-1	Kashiwa Reysol	Best Amenity Stadium	9,242
1-8	2015.04.29	Kawasaki Frontale	1-4	Kashiwa Reysol	Kawasaki Todoroki Stadium	20,961
1-9	2015.05.02	Kashiwa Reysol	0-0	Shimizu S-Pulse	Hitachi Kashiwa Stadium	13,960
1-11	2015.05.10	Montedio Yamagata	3-0	Kashiwa Reysol	ND Soft Stadium Yamagata	8,285
1-12	2015.05.14	Kashiwa Reysol	0-0	Shonan Bellmare	Hitachi Kashiwa Stadium	6,701
1-14	2015.05.30	FC Tokyo	2-1	Kashiwa Reysol	Ajinomoto Stadium	23,439
1-10	2015.06.03	Kashiwa Reysol	3-3	Urawa Reds	Hitachi Kashiwa Stadium	12,620
1-15	2015.06.07	Kashiwa Reysol	2-3	Sanfrecce Hiroshima	Hitachi Kashiwa Stadium	11,352
1-16	2015.06.20	Nagoya Grampus	1-0	Kashiwa Reysol	Toyota Stadium	15,848
1-13	2015.06.23	Kashiwa Reysol	1-0	Gamba Osaka	Hitachi Kashiwa Stadium	9,997
1-17	2015.06.27	Ventforet Kofu	1-1	Kashiwa Reysol	Yamanashi Chuo Bank Stadium	11,019
2-1	2015.07.11	Kashiwa Reysol	2-3	Sagan Tosu	Hitachi Kashiwa Stadium	11,371
2-2	2015.07.15	Yokohama F. Marinos	0-1	Kashiwa Reysol	NHK Spring Mitsuzawa Football Stadium	8,038
2-3	2015.07.19	Kashiwa Reysol	1-0	Kawasaki Frontale	Hitachi Kashiwa Stadium	14,055
2-4	2015.07.25	Vegalta Sendai	0-1	Kashiwa Reysol	Yurtec Stadium Sendai	13,070
2-5	2015.07.29	Shonan Bellmare	3-0	Kashiwa Reysol	Shonan BMW Stadium Hiratsuka	10,411
2-6	2015.08.12	Kashiwa Reysol	2-0	Vissel Kobe	Hitachi Kashiwa Stadium	12,383
2-7	2015.08.16	Sanfrecce Hiroshima	0-3	Kashiwa Reysol	Edion Stadium Hiroshima	14,471
2-8	2015.08.20	Kashiwa Reysol	2-0	Matsumoto Yamaga FC	Hitachi Kashiwa Stadium	7,385
2-9	2015.08.30	Kashiwa Reysol	2-2	Ventforet Kofu	Hitachi Kashiwa Stadium	8,002
2-10	2015.09.11	Urawa Reds	1-0	Kashiwa Reysol	Saitama Stadium 2002	23,957
2-11	2015.09.20	Kashiwa Reysol	0-0	Montedio Yamagata	Hitachi Kashiwa Stadium	10,520
2-12	2015.09.26	Gamba Osaka	3-1	Kashiwa Reysol	Expo '70 Commemorative Stadium	16,438
2-13	2015.10.03	Kashiwa Reysol	3-1	Nagoya Grampus	Hitachi Kashiwa Stadium	10,103
2-14	2015.10.17	Kashima Antlers	3-2	Kashiwa Reysol	Kashima Soccer Stadium	13,633
2-15	2015.10.24	Shimizu S-Pulse	0-3	Kashiwa Reysol	IAI Stadium Nihondaira	12,238
2-16	2015.11.07	Kashiwa Reysol	0-1	FC Tokyo	Hitachi Kashiwa Stadium	12,497
2-17	2015.11.22	Kashiwa Reysol	1-1	Albirex Niigata	Hitachi Kashiwa Stadium	13,127
