= Yusuke Kobayashi (footballer, born 1994) =

Japanese footballer

Yusuke Kobayashi 小林 祐介
Personal information
- Full name: Yusuke Kobayashi
- Date of birth: 23 October 1994 (age 32)
- Place of birth: Urawa, Saitama, Japan
- Height: 1.72 m (5 ft 8 in)
- Position: Midfielder

Team information
- Current team: JEF United Chiba
- Number: 5

Youth career
- 2007–2012: Kashiwa Reysol

Senior career*
Years	Team	Apps	(Gls)
2013–2021	Kashiwa Reysol	85	(1)
2014	→ J. League U-22 (loan)	4	(0)
2018	→ Shonan Bellmare (loan)	1	(0)
2021–	JEF United Chiba	124	(0)
Medal record
Kashiwa Reysol
Winner	J.League Cup	2013
Shonan Bellmare
Winner	J.League Cup	2018
- * Club domestic league appearances and goals as of 12 August 2026

Yusuke Kobayashi (小林 祐介, Kobayashi Yusuke; born 23 October 1994 in Urawa, Saitama) is a Japanese professional footballer who plays as a midfielder for J1 League club JEF United Chiba.

== Club statistics ==
As of 3 March 2023.

Appearances and goals by club, season and competition
Club	Season	League			Emperor's Cup		J.League Cup		Other		Total	
Club	Season	Division	Apps	Goals	Apps	Goals	Apps	Goals	Apps	Goals	Apps	Goals
Kashiwa Reysol	2014	J1 League	10	0	1	0	2	0	1 (Note: Appearance in the Suruga Bank Championship)	0	14	0
Kashiwa Reysol	2015	J1 League	14	0	1	0	1	0	5 (Note: Appearances in the AFC Champions League)	1	21	1
Kashiwa Reysol	2016	J1 League	22	0	2	0	4	0	–		28	0
Kashiwa Reysol	2017	J1 League	14	1	3	0	3	0	–		20	1
Kashiwa Reysol	2019	J2 League	16	0	2	0	4	0	–		22	0
Kashiwa Reysol	2020	J1 League	9	0	0	0	3	0	–		12	0
Kashiwa Reysol	Total		85	1	9	0	17	0	6	1	117	2
J.League U-22 (loan)	2014	J3 League	4	0	–		–		–		4	0
Shonan Bellmare (loan)	2018	J1 League	1	0	0	0	1	0	–		2	0
JEF United Chiba	2021	J2 League	24	0	2	0	–		–		26	0
JEF United Chiba	2022	J2 League	23	0	1	0	–		–		24	0
JEF United Chiba	2023	J2 League	2	0	0	0	–		–		2	0
JEF United Chiba	Total		49	0	3	0	0	0	0	0	52	0
Career total			139	1	12	0	18	0	6	1	175	2
