= Kenta Kano =

Japanese footballer

Personal information
- Full name: Kenta Kano
- Date of birth: 2 May 1986 (age 40)
- Place of birth: Shizuoka, Japan
- Height: 1.76 m (5 ft 9 in)
- Position: Attacking midfielder

Youth career
- 2002–2004: Shizuoka Gakuen High School

Senior career*
Years	Team	Apps	(Gls)
2005–2012	Yokohama F. Marinos	107	(9)
2013–2015	Kashiwa Reysol	34	(3)
2016–2017	Kawasaki Frontale	7	(1)
2018–2019	Tokushima Vortis	29	(1)
Total		177	(14)
- * Club domestic league appearances and goals

Kenta Kano (Japanese: 狩野 健太, born 2 May 1986) is a Japanese former footballer who played as an attacking midfielder.

== J-League Firsts ==
- Appearance: 24 April 2005. Yokohama F. Marinos 1 vs 2 Omiya Ardija, Nissan Stadium
- Goal: 15 April 2006. Yokohama F. Marinos 3 vs 4 Gamba Osaka, Nissan Stadium

== Club career stats ==
Updated to end of 2018 season.

Club performance			League		Cup		League Cup		Continental		Total	
Season	Club	League	Apps	Goals	Apps	Goals	Apps	Goals	Apps	Goals	Apps	Goals
Japan			League		Emperor's Cup		League Cup		Asia		Total	
2005	Yokohama F. Marinos	J1 League	1	0	0	0	0	0	0	0	1	0
2006	Yokohama F. Marinos	J1 League	13	1	3	0	8	1	-		24	2
2007	Yokohama F. Marinos	J1 League	18	0	2	1	4	1	-		24	2
2008	Yokohama F. Marinos	J1 League	13	3	4	2	0	0	-		17	5
2009	Yokohama F. Marinos	J1 League	28	4	3	1	9	1	-		40	6
2010	Yokohama F. Marinos	J1 League	20	1	0	0	5	0	-		25	1
2011	Yokohama F. Marinos	J1 League	10	0	0	0	3	0	-		13	0
2012	Yokohama F. Marinos	J1 League	4	0	4	1	4	0	-		12	1
2013	Kashiwa Reysol	J1 League	18	2	2	0	2	0	4	1	26	3
2014	Kashiwa Reysol	J1 League	13	1	1	0	2	0	-		16	1
2015	Kashiwa Reysol	J1 League	3	0	1	0	0	0	1	0	5	0
2016	Kawasaki Frontale	J1 League	5	1	0	0	4	2	-		9	3
2017	Kawasaki Frontale	J1 League	2	0	2	0	2	0	0	0	6	0
2018	Tokushima Vortis	J2 League	17	1	1	0	-		-		18	1
Career total			165	14	23	5	43	6	5	1	236	26
