= Wataru Hashimoto =

Japanese footballer (born 1986)

Wataru Hashimoto 橋本 和
Personal information
- Full name: Wataru Hashimoto
- Date of birth: 14 September 1986 (age 40)
- Place of birth: Nagahama, Shiga, Japan
- Height: 1.81 m (5 ft 11 in)
- Position: Left back

Team information
- Current team: FC Gifu Second

Youth career
- 2005–2008: Osaka University of Health and Sport Sciences

Senior career*
Years	Team	Apps	(Gls)
2009–2014	Kashiwa Reysol	135	(5)
2015–2016	Urawa Red Diamonds	7	(0)
2016	→ Vissel Kobe (loan)	14	(0)
2017–2019	Vissel Kobe	31	(1)
2020–2022	FC Gifu	66	(4)
2024–	FC Gifu Second	3	(0)
Medal record
Kashiwa Reysol
Winner	J1 League	2011
Winner	J.League Cup	2013
Winner	Emperor's Cup	2012
Urawa Red Diamonds
Runner-up	J1 League	2016
Winner	J.League Cup	2016
Runner-up	Emperor's Cup	2015
- * Club domestic league appearances and goals as of 2 June 2024

Wataru Hashimoto (橋本 和, Hashimoto Wataru; born 14 September 1986) is a Japanese football player who plays in the sixth-tier Tōkai Adult Soccer League for FC Gifu Second, the reserve team of FC Gifu.

== Club statistics ==
Updated to 23 February 2018.

Club performance			League		Cup		League Cup		Continental		Other		Total	
Season	Club	League	Apps	Goals	Apps	Goals	Apps	Goals	Apps	Goals	Apps	Goals	Apps	Goals
Japan			League		Emperor's Cup		J. League Cup		AFC		Other^{1}		Total	
2009	Kashiwa Reysol	J1 League	4	0	1	0	0	0	-		-		5	0
2010	Kashiwa Reysol	J2 League	29	0	2	0	-		-		-		31	0
2011	Kashiwa Reysol	J1 League	25	1	3	1	0	0	-		4	0	32	2
2012	Kashiwa Reysol	J1 League	25	1	5	0	4	0	3	0	1	0	38	1
2013	Kashiwa Reysol	J1 League	20	0	3	0	4	0	4	0	-		31	0
2014	Kashiwa Reysol	J1 League	32	3	2	2	9	1	-		1	0	44	6
2015	Urawa Red Diamonds	J1 League	6	0	2	1	2	0	5	0	0	0	15	1
2016	Urawa Red Diamonds	J1 League	1	0	–		–		2	0	–		3	0
2016	Vissel Kobe	J1 League	14	0	3	0	0	0	–		–		17	0
2017	Vissel Kobe	J1 League	14	1	1	0	5	0	–		–		20	1
2018	Vissel Kobe	J1 League	14	0	0	0	3	0	–		–		17	0
Total			184	6	22	4	27	1	14	0	6	0	238	10

^{1}Includes FIFA Club World Cup, J. League Championship, Suruga Bank Championship and Japanese Super Cup.
