= Tatsuya Masushima =

Japanese footballer (born 1985)

Tatsuya Masushima 増嶋 竜也
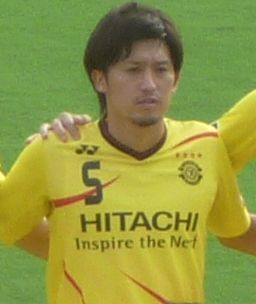
- Masushima with Kashiwa Reysol in 2014

Personal information
- Full name: Tatsuya Masushima
- Date of birth: April 22, 1985 (age 41)
- Place of birth: Chiba, Chiba, Japan
- Height: 1.79 m (5 ft 10 in)
- Position: Defender

Team information
- Current team: Shibuya City FC (manager)

Youth career
- 2001–2003: Ichiritsu Funabashi High School

Senior career*
Years	Team	Apps	(Gls)
2004–2008	FC Tokyo	25	(1)
2007	→ Ventforet Kofu (loan)	25	(4)
2008	→ Kyoto Sanga FC (loan)	32	(0)
2009–2010	Kyoto Sanga FC	46	(0)
2011–2019	Kashiwa Reysol	115	(6)
2017	→ Vegalta Sendai (loan)	22	(1)
2018–2019	→ JEF United Chiba (loan)	54	(5)
2020	JEF United Chiba	18	(2)

International career
2003–2005	Japan U-20	12	(3)

Managerial career
- 2023–: Shibuya City FC
Medal record
FC Tokyo
Winner	J.League Cup	2004
Kashiwa Reysol
Winner	J1 League	2011
Winner	J.League Cup	2013
Winner	Emperor's Cup	2012
Representing Japan
AFC U-19 Championship
Bronze medal – third place	2004 Malaysia
- * Club domestic league appearances and goals as of 4 January 2021

Tatsuya Masushima (増嶋 竜也, Masushima Tatsuya; born April 22, 1985) is a Japanese football manager and former player who play as a Defender and currently manager of Shibuya City FC.

== Career ==
After three seasons playing for JEF United Chiba, Masushima retired in December 2020.

== National team career ==
In June 2005, Masushima was selected Japan U-20 national team for 2005 World Youth Championship. At this tournament, he played all 4 matches as center back.

== Managerial career ==
On 8 January 2023, Masushima announcement officially manager of Shibuya City FC for ahead of 2023 season.

== Personal life ==
Masushima married badminton player Reiko Shiota on September 30, 2012.

== Club statistics ==
As of the end 2018 season.

Club	Season	League		Cup		League Cup		Continental^{1}		Other^{2}		Total	
Club	Season	Apps	Goals	Apps	Goals	Apps	Goals	Apps	Goals	Apps	Goals	Apps	Goals
FC Tokyo	2004	7	0	1	0	2	0	-		-		10	0
FC Tokyo	2005	4	0	0	0	0	0	-		-		4	0
FC Tokyo	2006	14	1	2	2	3	0	-		-		19	3
Total		25	1	3	2	5	0	-		-		33	3
Ventforet Kofu	2007	25	4	0	0	7	1	-		-		32	5
Total		25	4	0	0	7	1	-		-		32	5
Kyoto Sanga FC	2008	32	0	2	0	6	0	-		-		40	0
Kyoto Sanga FC	2009	21	0	1	0	5	0	-		-		27	0
Kyoto Sanga FC	2010	25	0	0	0	6	0	-		-		31	0
Total		78	0	3	0	17	0	-		-		98	0
Kashiwa Reysol	2011	25	0	3	1	1	0	-		4	0	33	1
Kashiwa Reysol	2012	30	4	5	1	4	0	7	0	1	0	47	5
Kashiwa Reysol	2013	25	1	2	0	3	0	9	2	1	0	40	3
Kashiwa Reysol	2014	16	1	1	0	3	0	-		1	0	21	1
Kashiwa Reysol	2015	2	0	0	0	0	0	3	0	-		5	0
Kashiwa Reysol	2016	17	0	2	0	3	2	-		-		22	2
Total		115	6	13	2	14	2	19	2	7	0	173	12
Vegalta Sendai	2017	22	1	0	0	5	0	-		-		27	1
Total		22	1	0	0	5	0	-		-		27	1
JEF United Chiba	2018	23	3	1	0	-		-		-		24	3
JEF United Chiba	2019	31	2	0	0	-		-		-		31	2
JEF United Chiba	2020					-		-		-			
Total		54	5	1	0	-		-		-		55	5
Career total		319	17	20	4	48	3	19	2	7	0	413	26

^{1}Includes AFC Champions League.

^{2}Includes FIFA Club World Cup, Japanese Super Cup and Suruga Bank Championship.

== National team statistics ==
=== Appearances in major competitions ===
Team	Competition	Category	Appearances		Goals	Team record
Team	Competition	Category	Start	Sub	Goals	Team record
Japan	AFC Youth Championship 2004 Qualification	U-18	2	0	3	Qualified
Japan	AFC Youth Championship 2004	U-19	6	0	0	3rd Place
Japan	FIFA World Youth Championship 2005	U-20	4	0	0	Round of 16

== Honours ==
=== Player ===
FC Tokyo

- J.League Cup (1): 2004

Kashiwa Reysol

- J1 League (1): 2011
- Emperor's Cup (1): 2012
- Japanese Super Cup (1): 2012
- J.League Cup (1): 2013
- Suruga Bank Championship (1): 2014

=== Manager ===
Shibuya City FC

- Tokyo Prefectural League Division 1 Runner-up: 2024
