= Hirofumi Watanabe =

Japanese footballer

Hirofumi Watanabe 渡部博文
Personal information
- Full name: Hirofumi Watanabe
- Date of birth: July 7, 1987 (age 39)
- Place of birth: Nagai, Yamagata, Japan
- Height: 1.86 m (6 ft 1 in)
- Position: Defender

Team information
- Current team: Renofa Yamaguchi FC
- Number: 6

Youth career
- 2003–2005: Yamagata Chūō High School
- 2006–2009: Senshu University

Senior career*
Years	Team	Apps	(Gls)
2010–2014	Kashiwa Reysol	42	(2)
2011	→ Tochigi SC (loan)	33	(3)
2015–2016	Vegalta Sendai	63	(6)
2017–2020	Vissel Kobe	79	(3)
2021–2022	Renofa Yamaguchi FC		
Medal record
Kashiwa Reysol
Winner	J.League Cup	2013
Winner	Emperor's Cup	2012
- * Club domestic league appearances and goals as of 18 Apr 2021

Hirofumi Watanabe (渡部 博文, Watanabe Hirofumi; born July 7, 1987 in Nagai, Yamagata) is a former Japanese football player who last played for Renofa Yamaguchi FC.

== Career statistics ==
Updated to 4 December 2020.

Club performance			League		Cup		League Cup		Continental		Total	
Season	Club	League	Apps	Goals	Apps	Goals	Apps	Goals	Apps	Goals	Apps	Goals
Japan			League		Emperor's Cup		League Cup		AFC		Total	
2010	Kashiwa Reysol	J2 League	2	0	0	0	–		–		2	0
2011	Tochigi SC	J2 League	33	3	2	0	–		–		35	3
2012	Kashiwa Reysol	J1 League	5	0	2	1	1	0	2	0	10	1
2013	Kashiwa Reysol	J1 League	12	1	2	0	2	0	5	1	21	2
2014	Kashiwa Reysol	J1 League	23	1	2	0	8	2	–		33	3
2015	Vegalta Sendai	J1 League	30	3	3	0	5	0	–		38	3
2016	Vegalta Sendai	J1 League	33	3	1	0	2	0	–		36	3
2017	Vissel Kobe	J1 League	33	3	5	0	4	0	–		42	3
2018	Vissel Kobe	J1 League	26	0	3	0	2	0	–		31	0
2019	Vissel Kobe	J1 League	6	0	2	0	6	0	–		14	0
2020	Vissel Kobe	J1 League	15	0	–		1	0	3	1	19	1
Career total			218	14	22	0	31	2	10	2	281	18
