= Tetsuro Ota =

Japanese footballer

Personal information
- Date of birth: July 2, 1989 (age 37)
- Place of birth: Tsuchiura, Japan
- Height: 1.76 m (5 ft 9 in)
- Position: Midfielder

Youth career
- 2002–2007: Kashiwa Reysol

Senior career*
Years	Team	Apps	(Gls)
2008–2012	Montedio Yamagata	54	(4)
2013–2016	Kashiwa Reysol	57	(9)
2017	Sagan Tosu	0	(0)
2017	→ Montedio Yamagata (loan)	9	(0)
2018–2019	ReinMeer Aomori	46	(5)
Medal record
Kashiwa Reysol
Winner	J.League Cup	2013
- * Club domestic league appearances and goals as of 1 January 2020

Tetsuro Ota (太田 徹郎, Ōta Tetsuro; born July 2, 1989 in Ibaraki) is a retired Japanese football player who last featured for ReinMeer Aomori.

== Career statistics ==
Updated to 1 January 2020.

Club performance			League		Cup		League Cup		Continental		Total	
Season	Club	League	Apps	Goals	Apps	Goals	Apps	Goals	Apps	Goals	Apps	Goals
Japan			League		Emperor's Cup		League Cup		AFC		Total	
2008	Montedio Yamagata	J2 League	3	0	0	0	-		-		3	0
2009	Montedio Yamagata	J1 League	3	0	0	0	1	0	–		4	0
2010	Montedio Yamagata	J1 League	7	0	3	1	0	0	–		10	1
2011	Montedio Yamagata	J1 League	26	3	1	0	2	0	–		29	3
2012	Montedio Yamagata	J2 League	15	1	0	0	–		–		15	1
2013	Kashiwa Reysol	J1 League	12	3	3	1	1	0	1	0	17	4
2014	Kashiwa Reysol	J1 League	18	4	1	0	6	0	–		25	4
2015	Kashiwa Reysol	J1 League	22	2	3	0	2	0	7	0	34	2
2016	Kashiwa Reysol	J1 League	5	0	1	0	5	0	–		11	0
2017	Sagan Tosu	J1 League	0	0	0	0	4	0	–		4	0
2017	Montedio Yamagata	J2 League	9	0	0	0	–		–		9	0
2018	ReinMeer Aomori	JFL	30	5	2	2	-		-		32	7
2019	ReinMeer Aomori	JFL	16	0	-		-		-		16	0
Career total			166	18	14	4	21	0	8	0	209	22
