= Jorge Wagner =

Brazilian footballer

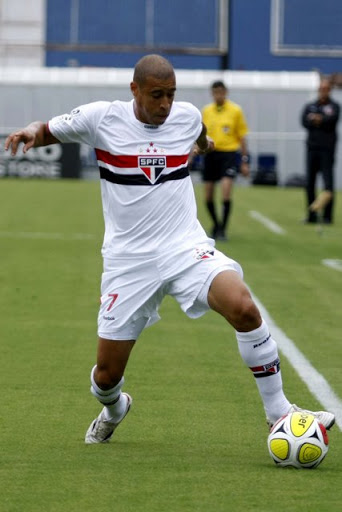
- Wagner with São Paulo in 2010

Personal information
- Full name: Jorge Wagner Goés Conceição
- Date of birth: 17 November 1978 (age 47)
- Place of birth: Feira de Santana, Brazil
- Height: 1.78 m (5 ft 10 in)
- Position: Midfielder

Youth career
- 1996–1998: Bahia

Senior career*
Years	Team	Apps	(Gls)
1998–2000	Bahia	24	(9)
2001–2003	Cruzeiro	33	(4)
2003	→ Corinthians (loan)	18	(0)
2003–2006	Lokomotiv Moscow	18	(2)
2005–2006	→ Internacional (loan)	46	(12)
2006–2007	Real Betis	10	(0)
2007	→ São Paulo (loan)	34	(4)
2008–2010	São Paulo	91	(9)
2011–2013	Kashiwa Reysol	91	(20)
2014	Botafogo	1	(1)
2014	Kashima Antlers	8	(0)
2015	Vitória	0	(0)
2017	Fluminense de Feira		
- * Club domestic league appearances and goals

Jorge Wagner Goés Conceição, or simply Jorge Wagner (born 17 November 1978), is a Brazilian former footballer.

Mainly an attacking midfielder, he could also play as a left midfielder, left wing-back, left winger, central midfielder and left back; Wagner was known for his versatility, creativity and fierce shot.

== Career ==
=== Bahia ===
Wágner played for Esporte Clube Bahia during the 2000/2001 season, scoring 7 goals in 23 appearances.

=== Cruzeiro ===
He then moved to Cruzeiro Esporte Clube where he made 33 league appearances, scoring 4 goals.

=== Lokomotiv Moscow ===
Wágner then moved to FC Lokomotiv Moscow in 2003. He made only 7 league appearances before being loaned to Corinthians where he made 18 league appearances. He returned to FC Lokomotiv Moscow where he made only 6 more league appearances.

=== Internacional ===
Wágner then moved to Internacional in 2005 where he made 13 first team appearances, scoring 4 goals. In 2006, during his second season with Internacional he won the Copa Libertadores beating rivals São Paulo Futebol Clube.

=== Real Betis ===
Wágner moved to Betis in August 2006. He was purchased for €200,000. Wágner made his Betis debut against Athletic Bilbao on 10 September 2006 at the Manuel Ruiz de Lopera stadium, which Betis won 3–0. He came on as a second-half substitute.

=== São Paulo ===
Wágner was then loaned to São Paulo from Betis for 2007 season where he missed the early rounds of the season through injury. However, after regaining full fitness he enjoyed 1st team football and went on to win the Campeonato Brasileiro in 2007 and was voted the best left midfielder by the CBF. São Paulo have since agreed a permanent deal with Betis and Wágner has signed a 3-year deal.

=== In Japan ===
On 7 July 2010, Wagner sign a contract to 2011 with Japanese club Kashiwa Reysol. He was one of the key players in Reysol's first ever J1 League winning campaign, recording 11 goals in 31 appearances. He was also named as one of the players in the J. League Best Eleven after the season.

=== Vitória ===
On 20 January 2015, Wágner was signed by Brazilian club Vitória.

=== Brazilian team ===
In 2008, Wagner, still uncapped for the national team at any level, according to O Globo, was in a list of 74 players who could be called up by coach Dunga to play 2008 Summer Olympics for Brazilian team. However, Wagner was not called up to play that competition.

== Club statistics ==
Club performance			League		state League		Cup		League Cup		International		Total	
Season	Club	League	Apps	Goals	Apps	Goals	Apps	Goals	Apps	Goals	Apps	Goals	Apps	Goals
Brazil			B.League		P.League		Copa do Brasil		League Cup		International		Total	
2005	Internacional	Série A	37	10	-	-	-	-	-	-	-	-	37	10
2006	Internacional	Série A	9	2	-	-	-	-	-	-	-	-	9	2
Spain			League		-		Copa del Rey		League Cup		International		Total	
2006–07	Real Betis	La Liga	10	0	-	-	-	-	-	-	-	-	10	0
Brazil			B.League		P.League		Copa del Rey		League Cup		International		Total	
2007	São Paulo	Série A	34	10	-	-	-	-	-	-	-	-	34	10
2008	São Paulo	Série A	36	8	-	-	-	-	-	-	-	-	36	8
2009	São Paulo	Série A	34	8	17	3	-	-	-	-	6	0	57	11
2010	São Paulo	Série A	21	0	15	1	-	-	-	-	7	0	43	1
Japan			League				Emperor's Cup		League Cup		Asia		Total	
2011	Kashiwa Reysol	J1 League	31	11	-	-	3	1	2	0	4	0	40	12
2012	Kashiwa Reysol	J1 League	33	8	-	-	4	1	3	1	7	0	47	10
2013	Kashiwa Reysol	J1 League	17	1	-	-	3	0	-	-	7	1	27	2
Total	Brazil		171	38	32	4	0	0	0	0	13	0	216	42
Total	Spain		10	0	0	0	0	0	0	0	0	0	10	0
Total	Japan		81	20	0	0	10	2	5	1	18	1	114	24
Total			160	57	0	0	8	9	5	4	17	8	340	66

== Honours ==
Bahia

- Bahia State League: 1 1998

Cruzeiro

- South Minas Cup: 2 2001, 2002
- Minas Gerais State League: 2 2001, 2002

Corinthians

- São Paulo State League: 1 2003

Lokomotiv Moscow

- Championship of Russia: 1 2004

Internacional

- Rio Grande do Sul State League: 1 2005
- Copa Libertadores: 1 2006

São Paulo

- Brazilian League: 2 2007, 2008

Kashiwa Reysol

- J1 League: 1 2011

Individual

- J. League Best Eleven: 1 2011
