= Masakatsu Sawa =

Peruvian football player

Masakatsu Sawa 澤 昌克
Personal information
- Full name: Masakatsu Sawa
- Date of birth: January 12, 1983 (age 43)
- Place of birth: Moriya, Ibaraki, Japan
- Height: 1.73 m (5 ft 8 in)
- Position: Midfielder

Team information
- Current team: Deportivo Municipal
- Number: 30

Youth career
- 2002–2004: River Plate

Senior career*
Years	Team	Apps	(Gls)
2005	Sporting Cristal	5	(1)
2006	Coronel Bolognesi	40	(11)
2007	Deportivo Municipal	38	(10)
2008	Cienciano	21	(3)
2008–2013	Kashiwa Reysol	91	(11)
2014–2017	Deportivo Municipal	115	(21)
2018	Kashiwa Reysol	0	(0)
2019	Unión Huaral	6	(3)
2020	Deportivo Municipal	7	(0)
Medal record
Kashiwa Reysol
Winner	J1 League	2011
Winner	J.League Cup	2013
Winner	Emperor's Cup	2012
Runner-up	Emperor's Cup	2008
- * Club domestic league appearances and goals as of 20:33, 16 January 2020 (UTC)

Masakatsu Sawa (澤 昌克, Sawa Masakatsu; born January 12, 1983) is a former Japanese nationalized Peruvian football player. He plays for Deportivo Municipal. His preferred position is as an attacking midfielder.

== Career ==
On 13 September 2006, he became the first Japanese goalscorer in Copa Sudamericana, scoring 1 goal for Coronel Bolognesi against Chilean club Colo-Colo. After impressive performances for Coronel Bolognesi and Deportivo Municipal, he was offered to play for Peru national team. But he refused the offer because he did not want to lose Japanese nationality. In July 2008, he joined Japanese club Kashiwa Reysol, located near his hometown, Moriya across the prefectural line.

Sawa was a Kashiwa Reysol player in the 2018 season but did never play a game for the club due to injuries. The club then announced on 11 January 2019, that the player had left the club by mutual consent.

== Club statistics ==
Updated to 22 February 2018.

Club performance			League		Cup		League Cup		Continental		Other^{1}		Total	
Season	Club	League	Apps	Goals	Apps	Goals	Apps	Goals	Apps	Goals	Apps	Goals	Apps	Goals
2005	Sporting Cristal	Primera División	5	1	–		–		–		–		5	1
2006	Coronel Bolognesi	Primera División	40	11	–		–		–		–		40	11
2007	Deportivo Municipal	Primera División	38	10	–		–		–		–		3	0
2008	Cienciano	Primera División	21	3	–		–		6	0	–		27	3
2008	Kashiwa Reysol	J1 League	0	0	0	0	0	0	–		–		0	0
2009	Kashiwa Reysol	J1 League	9	0	1	0	0	0	–		–		10	0
2010	Kashiwa Reysol	J2 League	26	2	1	0	–		–		–		27	2
2011	Kashiwa Reysol	J1 League	23	2	1	0	0	0	–		2	0	26	2
2012	Kashiwa Reysol	J1 League	26	6	6	2	3	0	3	0	1	0	26	2
2013	Kashiwa Reysol	J1 League	7	1	2	0	2	0	2	0	–		13	1
2014	Deportivo Municipal	Segunda División	30	12	–		–		–		–		30	12
2015	Deportivo Municipal	Primera División	29	5	–		–		–		–		29	5
2016	Deportivo Municipal	Primera División	35	4	–		–		–		–		35	4
2017	Deportivo Municipal	Primera División	21	0	–		–		–		–		21	0
Total			310	57	11	2	5	0	11	0	3	0	340	59

^{1}Includes FIFA Club World Cup and Japanese Super Cup.
