= Masato Kudo =

Japanese footballer (1990–2022)

Masato Kudo 工藤 壮人
Personal information
- Full name: Masato Kudo
- Date of birth: 6 May 1990
- Place of birth: Suginami, Tokyo, Japan
- Date of death: 21 October 2022 (aged 32)
- Place of death: Miyazaki, Japan
- Height: 1.77 m (5 ft 10 in)
- Position: Forward

Youth career
- 2000–2008: Kashiwa Reysol

Senior career*
Years	Team	Apps	(Gls)
2009–2015	Kashiwa Reysol	189	(66)
2016	Vancouver Whitecaps	16	(2)
2017–2020	Sanfrecce Hiroshima	30	(4)
2019–2020	→ Renofa Yamaguchi (loan)	27	(4)
2020–2021	Brisbane Roar	14	(1)
2022	Tegevajaro Miyazaki	21	(3)
Total		297	(80)

International career
2010	Japan U23	2	(0)
2013	Japan	4	(2)
- * Club domestic league appearances and goals as of 25 September 2022

Masato Kudo (工藤 壮人, Kudō Masato; 6 May 1990 – 21 October 2022) was a Japanese footballer who played as a forward.

== International career ==
On 23 September 2010, Kudo was selected for the Japan Under-21 squad for the 2010 Asian Games held in Guangzhou, China.

On 23 May 2013, Kudo was called up to Japan's senior team for the first time prior to an international exhibition game against Bulgaria.

== Personal life and death ==
On 11 May 2016, during a match, Kudo accidentally violently collided with goalkeeper Matt Lampson and suffered a fractured jaw.

Kudo died from complications of brain surgery on 21 October 2022. He was 32 years old.

== Career statistics ==
=== Club ===
As of the end of the 2018 season

Appearances and goals by club, season and competition
Club	Season	League		National cup (Note: Includes Emperor's Cup and Canadian Championship.)		League cup (Note: Includes J. League Cup and MLS Cup Playoffs.)		Continental (Note: Includes AFC Champions League and CONCACAF Champions League.)		Other (Note: Includes FIFA Club World Cup and Japanese Super Cup.)		Total	
Club	Season	Apps	Goals	Apps	Goals	Apps	Goals	Apps	Goals	Apps	Goals	Apps	Goals
Kashiwa Reysol	2009	3	0	2	0	0	0	—		—		5	0
Kashiwa Reysol	2010	27	10	2	1	—		—		—		29	11
Kashiwa Reysol	2011	25	7	3	2	2	0	—		3	1	33	10
Kashiwa Reysol	2012	33	13	5	2	4	2	6	0	—		48	17
Kashiwa Reysol	2013	33	19	2	0	4	2	12	6	1	0	52	27
Kashiwa Reysol	2014	34	7	0	0	10	4	1	0	0	0	45	11
Kashiwa Reysol	2015	34	10	1	1	2	1	10	4	0	0	47	16
Kashiwa Reysol	Total	189	66	15	6	22	9	29	10	4	1	259	92
Vancouver Whitecaps	2016	16	2	0	0	0	0	1	0	—		17	2
Sanfrecce Hiroshima	2017	18	3	3	3	4	1	—		—		25	7
Sanfrecce Hiroshima	2018	12	1	2	2	5	2	—		—		19	5
Sanfrecce Hiroshima	Total	30	4	5	5	9	3	0	0	0	0	44	12
Total		235	72	20	11	31	12	30	10	4	1	320	106

=== International ===
Appearances and goals by national team and year
National team	Year	Apps	Goals
Japan	2013	4	2
Total		4	2

Scores and results list Japan's goal tally first, score column indicates score after each Kudo goal.

List of international goals scored by Masato Kudo
No.	Date	Venue	Opponent	Score	Result	Competition
1	21 July 2013	Seoul World Cup Stadium, Seoul, South Korea	China	3–1	3–3	2013 EAFF East Asian Cup
2	6 September 2013	Nagai Stadium, Osaka, Japan	Guatemala	2–0	3–0	Friendly

== Honours ==
Kashiwa Reysol

- J. League Division 1: 2011
- J. League Division 2: 2010
- Emperor's Cup: 2012
- Japanese Super Cup: 2012
- J. League Cup: 2013
- Suruga Bank Championship: 2014

Japan

- Asian Games: 2010
- EAFF East Asian Cup: 2013
