= Ryoichi Kurisawa =

Japanese footballer

Ryoichi Kurisawa 栗澤 僚一
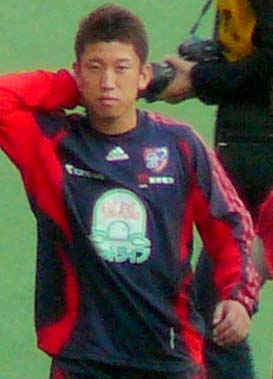
- Kurisawa with FC Tokyo in 2007

Personal information
- Full name: Ryoichi Kurisawa
- Date of birth: 5 September 1982 (age 44)
- Place of birth: Matsudo, Chiba, Japan
- Height: 1.70 m (5 ft 7 in)
- Position: Midfielder

Team information
- Current team: Kashiwa Reysol (Assistant Manager)

Youth career
- 1998–2000: Narashino High School
- 2001–2004: Ryutsu Keizai University

Senior career*
Years	Team	Apps	(Gls)
2004–2008	FC Tokyo	79	(4)
2008–2018	Kashiwa Reysol	217	(2)
Total		296	(6)

Managerial career
- 2019–: Kashiwa Reysol (assistant)
Medal record
FC Tokyo
Winner	J.League Cup	2004
Kashiwa Reysol
Winner	J1 League	2011
Winner	J.League Cup	2013
Winner	Emperor's Cup	2012
Runner-up	Emperor's Cup	2008
- * Club domestic league appearances and goals

Ryoichi Kurisawa (栗澤 僚一, Kurisawa Ryōichi; born 5 September 1982) is a Japanese football manager, he is the currently assistant manager for J1 League club Kashiwa Reysol and former player.

== Club statistics ==
Updated to 23 February 2019.

Club performance			League		Cup		League Cup		Continental		Other		Total	
Season	Club	League	Apps	Goals	Apps	Goals	Apps	Goals	Apps	Goals	Apps	Goals	Apps	Goals
Japan			League		Emperor's Cup		J.League Cup		AFC		Other^{1}		Total	
2004	FC Tokyo	J1 League	6	0	-		3	1	-		-		9	1
2005	FC Tokyo	J1 League	34	3	2	0	5	1	-		-		41	4
2006	FC Tokyo	J1 League	13	1	1	0	2	0	-		-		16	1
2007	FC Tokyo	J1 League	22	0	3	0	5	0	-		-		30	0
2008	FC Tokyo	J1 League	4	0	-		2	0	-		-		6	0
2008	Kashiwa Reysol	J1 League	11	1	5	0	-		-		-		16	1
2009	Kashiwa Reysol	J1 League	32	0	2	0	4	0	-		-		38	0
2010	Kashiwa Reysol	J2 League	31	0	3	0	-		-		-		34	0
2011	Kashiwa Reysol	J1 League	31	0	3	0	2	0	-		3	0	39	0
2012	Kashiwa Reysol	J1 League	26	0	4	0	3	0	4	0	-		37	0
2013	Kashiwa Reysol	J1 League	26	0	3	0	5	0	10	2	-		44	2
2014	Kashiwa Reysol	J1 League	14	0	0	0	5	0	-		-		19	0
2015	Kashiwa Reysol	J1 League	19	0	2	0	1	0	3	0	-		25	0
2016	Kashiwa Reysol	J1 League	18	1	2	0	2	0	-		-		22	1
2017	Kashiwa Reysol	J1 League	7	0	2	0	6	0	-		-		15	0
2018	Kashiwa Reysol	J1 League	2	0	2	0	0	0	0	0	-		4	0
Total			296	6	34	0	45	2	17	2	3	0	395	10

^{1}Includes Japanese Super Cup and FIFA Club World Cup.
