= 2012 Kashiwa Reysol season =

Kashiwa Reysol
2011 season
- Chairman: Shigeyuki Onoder
- Manager: Nelsinho Baptista
- J. League Division 1: 6th
- Emperor's Cup: Champions
- J. League Cup: Semi-final vs Kashima Antlers
- AFC Champions League: Last 16 vs Ulsan Hyundai
- Top goalscorer: League: Masato Kudo (13); All: Leandro Domingues (22)
Home colours	Away colours

The 2012 Kashiwa Reysol season was Kashiwa Reysol's second season in J. League Division 1 since 2009 and 40th overall in the Japanese top flight. It also includes the 2011 J. League Cup, and the 2011 Emperor's Cup.

== Transfers ==
=== Winter ===
In: Note: Flags indicate national team as defined under FIFA eligibility rules; some limited exceptions apply. Players may hold more than one non-FIFA nationality.

No.	Pos.	Nation	Player

Out: Note: Flags indicate national team as defined under FIFA eligibility rules; some limited exceptions apply. Players may hold more than one non-FIFA nationality.

No.	Pos.	Nation	Player
—	MF	JPN	Taishi Soma (loan to F.C. Ryukyu)
—	MF	JPN	Roasso Kumamoto (loan to Roasso Kumamoto)
—	FW	BRA	Efrain Rintaro (loan to Blaublitz Akita)

=== Summer ===
In: Note: Flags indicate national team as defined under FIFA eligibility rules; some limited exceptions apply. Players may hold more than one non-FIFA nationality.

No.	Pos.	Nation	Player
11	FW	BRA	Neto Baiano (Transferred from (Brazil) Vitória)

Out: Note: Flags indicate national team as defined under FIFA eligibility rules; some limited exceptions apply. Players may hold more than one non-FIFA nationality.

No.	Pos.	Nation	Player
2	DF	JPN	Takanori Nakajima (loan to Yokohama F.C.)
4	DF	JPN	Hiroki Sakai (Transferred to (Germany) Hannover 96)
9	FW	JPN	Hideaki Kitajima (loan to Roasso Kumamoto)
11	FW	JPN	Ryohei Hayashi (loan to Montedio Yamagata)
25	FW	BRA	Ricardo Lobo (loan to JEF United Chiba)
32	GK	JPN	Yuya Miura (loan to Matsumoto Yamaga)

== Competitions ==
=== Super Cup ===
3 March 2012 Final	Kashiwa Reysol	2–1	F.C. Tokyo	Tokyo
13:35 JST (UTC+9)	Jorge Wagner 26'; Barada (yellow card) 39'; Leandro Domingues 43' (pen.)	Summary	Hasegawa 65'	Stadium: National Olympic Stadium (Tokyo); Attendance: 35,453; Referee: (Japan) Yuichi Nishimura

=== J. League ===
==== Results ====
11 March 2012 1	Kashiwa Reysol	3–3	Yokohama F. Marinos	Kashiwa Hitachi Stadium
Sunday 14:04	Sakai 3'; Tanaka 12'; Domingues 64'	Report	7' Oguro; 60' Saito; 90+1' Taniguchi	Attendance: 13,082; Referee: Murakami

17 March 2012 2	Urawa Red Diamonds	1–0	Kashiwa Reysol	Saitama Stadium
Saturday 14:04	Despotović 36'	Report		Attendance: 41,069; Referee: Tojo

24 March 2012 3	Kashiwa Reysol	2–1	Shimizu S-Pulse	Kashiwa Hitachi Stadium
Saturday 19:04	Masushima 81', 86'	Report	38' Iwashita	Attendance: 12,209; Referee: Yoshida

31 March 2012 4	Jubilo Iwata	1–0	Kashiwa Reysol	Yamaha Stadium
Saturday 15:04	Maeda 26'	Report		Attendance: 9,042; Referee: Nakamura

7 April 2012 5	Consadole Sapporo	0–2	Kashiwa Reysol	Sapporo Dome
15:00 JST		Report	Kudo 33'; Tanaka (yellow card) 55'; Kondo 63'; Barada (yellow card) 90+3'	Attendance: 14,023; Referee: (Japan) Masaaki Iemoto

14 April 2012 6	Kashiwa Reysol	2–3	Vegalta Sendai	Kashiwa Hitachi Stadium
14:00 JST	Fujita (yellow card) 36'; Leandro Domingues 55', 66' (yellow card) 85' (yellow-red card) 88'; Sakai (yellow card) 80'	Report	Sugai 2'; Wilson (yellow card) 15'; Uemoto (yellow card) 34'; Ota (yellow card) 37'; Sekiguchi 56'; Akamine 78'; Uchiyama (yellow card) 90+3'	Attendance: 12,318; Referee: (Japan) Kenji Ogiya

21 April 2012 7	Vissel Kobe	3–1	Kashiwa Reysol	Home's Stadium Kobe
15:00 JST	Nozawa 14'; Takagi (yellow card) 35'; Ōkubo (yellow card) 64'; Okui (yellow card) 78'; Ogawa 85'; Tashiro 90+1'	Report	Sawa (yellow card) 30' (goal) 41'	Attendance: 10,859; Referee: (Japan) Ryuji Sato

28 April 2012 8	Kashiwa Reysol	1–1	Sagan Tosu	Kashiwa Hitachi Stadium
15:00 JST	Kitajima 45+1'; Masushima (yellow card) 69'	Report	Tozin (yellow card) 1'; Kim Min-Woo (yellow card) 64'; Kobayashi 70'; Fujita (yellow card) 90+2'	Attendance: 10,351; Referee: (Japan) Hiroyuki Kimura

27 June 2012 9	F.C. Tokyo	0–1	Kashiwa Reysol	Ajinomoto Stadium
20:00 JST	Yonemoto (yellow card) 54'; Kawano (yellow card) 89'	Report	Masushima 45+1'; Jorge Wagner (yellow card) 60'	Attendance: 25,813; Referee: (Japan) Nobutsugu Murakami

6 May 2012 10	Kashiwa Reysol	2–5	Sanfrecce Hiroshima	Kashiwa Hitachi Stadium
16:00 JST	Tanaka 61'; Ricardo Lobo (yellow card) 64'; Masushima (yellow card) 75'; Jorge Wagner 78'	Report	Satō 10', 47'; Mizumoto (yellow card) 40'; Ishihara (yellow card) 58' (goal) 90', 90+3'; Takahagi 85'	Attendance: 12,875; Referee: (Japan) Masaaki Iemoto

12 May 2012 11	Kawasaki Frontale	0–2	Kashiwa Reysol	Todoroki Athletics Stadium
16:00 JST		Report	Hashimoto (yellow card) 57'; Kudo 63'; Tanaka (yellow card) 74'; Jorge Wagner 90+2'	Attendance: 16,054; Referee: (Japan) Itaru Hirose

19 May 2012 12	Cerezo Osaka	1–2	Kashiwa Reysol	Kincho Stadium
20:00 JST	Kempes 36'; Fujimoto (yellow card) 85'; Ogihara (yellow card) 90+3'	Report	Leandro Domingues 63'; Tanaka 66'	Attendance: 19,643; Referee: (Japan) Yuichi Nishimura

26 May 2012 13	Kashiwa Reysol	2–0	Albirex Niigata	Kashiwa Hitachi Stadium
19:30 JST	Ishikawa 32' (o.g.); Kondo (yellow card) 36'; Nasu (yellow card) 71'; Otani (yellow card) 84'; Sawa 86'	Report	Murakami (yellow card) 13'; Tanaka (yellow card) 16'; Yano (yellow card) 63'	Attendance: 12,931; Referee: (Japan) Futoshi Nakamura

16 June 2012 14	Omiya Ardija	2–4	Kashiwa Reysol	NACK5 Stadium Omiya
20:00 JST	Carlinhos Paraíba 10' (yellow card) 35'; Kikuchi (yellow card) 32'; Cho Young-Cheol 58' (yellow card) 61'	Report	Leandro Domingues 23'; Jorge Wagner 26'; Masushima (yellow card) 28'; Kudo 34', 47'	Attendance: 9,025; Referee: (Japan) Jumpei Iida

23 June 2012 15	Kashiwa Reysol	1–1	Kashima Antlers	Kashiwa Hitachi Stadium
19:30 JST	Jorge Wagner (yellow card) 16'; Leandro Domingues (yellow card) 60'; Kondo 90+4' (pen.)	Report	Iwamasa (yellow card) 12'; Ogasawara 50'; Shibasaki (yellow card) 61'; Dutra (yellow card) 89'; Nishi (yellow card) 90+3'	Attendance: 13,987; Referee: (Paraguay) Antonio Arias

30 June 2012 16	Gamba Osaka	2–6	Kashiwa Reysol	Osaka Expo '70 Stadium
20:00 JST	Endō 35'; Sato 45+1'; Kurata (yellow card) 90+5'	Report	Sawa 3', 7', 68' (yellow card) 26'; Kudo 20'; Msushima (yellow card) 48'; Leandro Domingues 56'; Tanaka 90+2'	Attendance: 14,006; Referee: (Japan) Kenji Ogiya

7 July 2012 17	Kashiwa Reysol	1–2	Nagoya Grampus	Kashiwa Hitachi Stadium
20:00 JST	Leandro Domingues 17' (yellow card) 90+7'; Hashimoto (yellow card) 45+4'; Otani (yellow card) 56'; Kondo (yellow card) 90+5'	Report	Kennedy 9'; Córdoba (yellow card) 45+3'; Otani 63' (o.g.); Narazaki (yellow card) 83'; Tanaka (yellow card) 86'	Attendance: 25,459; Referee: (Japan) Masaaki Iemoto

14 July 2012 18	Shimizu S-Pulse	3–5	Kashiwa Reysol	Outsourcing Stadium Nihondaira
19:00 JST	Yoshida (yellow card) 30' (yellow-red card) 67'; Iwashita (yellow card) 32' (yellow-red card) 44'; Omae 37'; Takahara 53'; Brosque 63'	Report	Jorge Wagner (yellow card) 4' (red card) 66'; Barada (yellow card) 8'; Masushima (yellow card) 23'; Leandro Domingues 33' (pen.); Kudo 75', 90+5'; Hashimoto 88'; Mizuno 90+2'	Attendance: 14,092; Referee: (Japan) Yuichi Nishimura

28 July 2012 19	Kashiwa Reysol	4–1	Cerezo Osaka	Kashiwa Hitachi Stadium
20:00 JST	Kudo 28', 41', 50'; Sawa 68'	Report	Fujimoto (yellow card) 21'; Kakitani (yellow card) 35'; Bando 39'; Funatsu (yellow card) 73'	Attendance: 11,844; Referee: (Japan) Yoshiro Imamura

4 August 2012 20	Albirex Niigata	1–1	Kashiwa Reysol	Tohoku Electric Power Big Swan Stadium
20:00 JST	Bruno Lopes (yellow card) 29'; Homma (yellow card) 62' (yellow-red card) 69'; Yano 63' (yellow card) 69'	Report	Leandro Domingues (yellow card) 28'; Nasu (yellow card) 41'; Jorge Wagner 45'; Tanaka (yellow card) 77'; Hashimoto (yellow card) 89'	Attendance: 25,050; Referee: (England) Darren Deadman

11 August 2012 21	Kashiwa Reysol	1–1	F.C. Tokyo	Kashiwa Hitachi Stadium
20:00 JST	Fujita (yellow card) 10'; Leandro Domingues (yellow card) 44'; Jorge Wagner 67'	Report	Severino 11' (pen.); Hasegawa (yellow card) 35'; Kaga (yellow card) 52' (yellow-red card) 72'	Attendance: 13,478; Referee: (Japan) Ryuji Sato

18 August 2012 22	Vegalta Sendai	0–0	Kashiwa Reysol	Yurtec Stadium Sendai
20:00 JST	Matsushita (yellow card) 37'	Summary	Kudo (yellow card) 12'	Attendance: 17,715; Referee: (Japan) Hiroyoshi Takayama

25 August 2012 23	Kashiwa Reysol	0–3	Júbilo Iwata	Kashiwa Hitachi Stadium
20:00 JST	Kondo (red card) 18'; Jorge Wagner (yellow card) 44'; Masushima (yellow card) 55'; Sugeno (yellow card) 74'; Leandro Domingues (yellow card) 87'	Summary	Yamada 5'; Kobayashi (yellow card) 6'; Komano 28'; Fujita (yellow card) 68'; Maeda 78'; Chiyotanda (yellow card) 87'	Attendance: 13,248; Referee: (Japan) Kenji Ogiya

1 September 2012 24	Nagoya Grampus	1–0	Kashiwa Reysol	Toyota Stadium
20:00 JST	Nagai (yellow card) 41'; Abe (yellow card) 51'; Tulio (yellow card) 69'; Tamada 79'; Daniel (yellow card) 88'	Summary	Watanabe (yellow card) 15'; Kurisawa (yellow card) 62'	Attendance: 14,193; Referee: (Japan) Kazuhiko Matsumura

15 September 2012 25	Kashiwa Reysol	3–1	Consadole Sapporo	Kashiwa Hitachi Stadium
20:00	Otani 8'; Kudo 39'; Tanaka 90+4'	Summary	Uchimura (yellow card) 16'; Takaki (yellow card) 36'; Sakaki 81'	Attendance: 10,445; Referee: (Japan) Tomoya Maeda

22 September 2012 26	Sagan Tosu	3–1	Kashiwa Reysol	Tosu Stadium
20:00	Niwa (yellow card) 29'; Yeo Sung-Hye 43'; Fujita 45+1'; Kim Min-Woo 53'; Kobayashi (yellow card) 83'	Summary	Masushima (yellow card) 20'; Leandro Domingues 66'; Barada (yellow card) 90+2'	Attendance: 12,651; Referee: (Japan) Toshimitsu Yoshida

29 September 2012 27	Kashiwa Reysol	1–2	Urawa Red Diamonds	Kashiwa Hitachi Stadium
20:00 JST	Kondo (yellow card) 4'; Nagata 15' (o.g.); Fujita (yellow card) 17'	Summary	Makino (yellow card) 32'; Umesaki 39'; Popó 90+3'	Attendance: 26,106; Referee: (Japan) Nobutsugu Murakami

6 October 2012 28	Kashiwa Reysol	1–0	Kawasaki Frontale	Kashiwa Hitachi Stadium
16:00 JST	Kurisawa (yellow card) 31'; Fujita (yellow card) 50'; Jorge Wagner 66'; Sugeno (yellow card) 87'	Summary	Oshima (yellow card) 16'; Saneto (yellow card) 43'; Renê Ferreira dos Santos (yellow card) 79'	Attendance: 10,769; Referee: (Japan) Minoru Tojo

20 October 2012 29	Sanfrecce Hiroshima	1–2	Kashiwa Reysol	Hiroshima Big Arch
20:00 JST	Morisaki 52'	Summary	Kweon Han-Jin (yellow card) 21' (goal) 45+1'; An Yong-Hak (yellow card) 81'; Masushima 90+4'	Attendance: 24,839; Referee: (Japan) Jumpei Iida

27 October 2012 30	Kashiwa Reysol	1–4	Omiya Ardija	Kashiwa Hitachi Stadium
15:00 JST	Neto Baiano 90+4'	Summary	Ljubijankič 21', 47', 49'; Watanabe 79'	Attendance: 12,167; Referee: (Japan) Ryuji Sato

7 November 2012 31	Kashiwa Reysol	2–2	Gamba Osaka	Kashiwa Hitachi Stadium
19:00 JST	Kudo 12', 45'	Summary	Leandro 37', 90'	Attendance: 10,389; Referee: (Japan) Hajime Matsuo

17 November 2012 32	Yokohama F. Marinos	1–2	Kashiwa Reysol	International Stadium Yokohama
14:00 JST	Kondo 13' (o.g.)	Summary	Wagner 13'; Domingues 48'	Attendance: 22,647; Referee: (Japan) Futoshi Nakamura

24 November 2012 33	Kashiwa Reysol	1–0	Vissel Kobe	Kashiwa Hitachi Stadium
17:30 JST	Wagner 71'	Summary	Tanaka (yellow card) 23' (yellow-red card)	Attendance: 12,406; Referee: (Japan) Minoru Tojo

1 December 2012 34	Kashima Antlers	2–0	Kashiwa Reysol	Kashima Soccer Stadium
15:30 JST	Osako 41', 68'; Cajá (yellow card) 74' (yellow-red card)	Summary	Domingues (yellow card) 48' (yellow-red card) 89'	Attendance: 19,141; Referee: (Japan) Kenji Ogiya

==== League table ====
Pos	Team	Pld	W	D	L	GF	GA	GD	Pts	Qualification or relegation
4	Yokohama F. Marinos	34	13	14	7	44	33	+11	53	
5	Sagan Tosu	34	15	8	11	48	39	+9	53	
6	Kashiwa Reysol	34	15	7	12	57	52	+5	52	Qualification to 2013 Champions League (Note: The winners of the 2012 Emperor's Cup qualified for the group stage of the 2013 AFC Champions League.)
7	Nagoya Grampus	34	15	7	12	46	47	−1	52	
8	Kawasaki Frontale	34	14	8	12	51	50	+1	50	

Updated to match(es) played on 1 December 2012. Source: J.League Division 1
Rules for classification: 1) points; 2) goal difference; 3) number of goals scored.

=== J. League Cup ===
25 July 2012 Quarter-finals First Leg	Gamba Osaka	1–3	Kashiwa Reysol	Osaka
20:00 JST	Konno (yellow card) 12'; Kurata (yellow card) 53'; Niwa 83'	Report	Kudo 47'; Kurisawa (yellow card) 60'; Leandro Domingues 76', 90+5'; Sawa (yellow card) 82'; Barada (yellow card) 90'; Sugeno (yellow card) 90+5'	Stadium: Osaka Expo '70 Stadium; Attendance: 7,083; Referee: (Japan) Toshimitsu Yoshida

8 August 2012 Quarter-finals Second Leg	Kashiwa Reysol	2–1 (5–2 agg.)	Gamba Osaka	Kashiwa
20:00 JST	Leandro Domingues 17'; Kudo 60'	Report	Sato 30'; Leandro (yellow card) 77'	Stadium: Hitachi Kashiwa Soccer Stadium; Attendance: 6,910; Referee: (Japan) Jumpei Iida

5 September 2012 Semi-finals First Leg	Kashima Antlers	3–2	Kashiwa Reysol	Kashima
20:00	Osako 7', 69'; Aoki (yellow card) 29'; Renato Cajá 36'; Ogasawara (yellow card) 85'	Summary	Leandro Domingues (yellow card) 20' (goal) 62'; Barada 35'; Kurisawa (yellow card) 39'; Nasu (yellow card) 59'	Stadium: Kashima Soccer Stadium; Attendance: 9,115; Referee: (Japan) Hajime Matsuo

13 October 2012 Second leg	Kashiwa Reysol	2–2 (4–5 agg.)	Kashima Antlers	Kashiwa
20:00	Jorge Wagner 37'; Barada (yellow card) 38'; Neto Baiano 90+4'	Summary	Dutra 12'; Osako 24'	Stadium: Hitachi Kashiwa Soccer Stadium; Attendance: 13,527; Referee: (Japan) Yuichi Nishimura

=== Emperor's Cup ===
8 September 2012 Round 2	Kashiwa Reysol	3–0	Kashiwa Reysol U-18	Kashiwa, Chiba
13:00 JST	Leandro Domingues 14', 45+1'; Sawa 47'	Report		Stadium: Hitachi Kashiwa Soccer Stadium; Attendance: 4,712; Referee: Hiroyuki Kimura

10 October 2012 Round 3	Kashiwa Reysol	2–1	Shonan Bellmare	Kashiwa, Chiba
19:00 JST	Tanaka 30'; Neto Baiano 90+2'	Report	Otsuki 15'	Stadium: Hitachi Kashiwa Soccer Stadium; Attendance: 3,449; Referee: Tomohiro Inoue

15 December 2012 Round 4	Kashiwa Reysol	1–0	Yokogawa Musashino	Kashiwa, Chiba
13:00 JST	Tanaka 24'	Report		Stadium: Hitachi Kashiwa Soccer Stadium; Attendance: 5,298; Referee: Hiroyoshi Takayama

23 December 2012 Quarterfinals	Omiya Ardija	2–3	Kashiwa Reysol	Kumagaya
13:00 JST	Ueda 11'; Cho 23'	Summary	Sawa 59'; Masushima 83'; Kudo 90'	Stadium: Kumagaya Athletic Stadium; Attendance: 7,090; Referee: Yuichi Nishimura

29 December 2012 Semifinals	Yokohama F. Marinos	0–1	Kashiwa Reysol	Shinjuku
15:00 JST		Summary	Kudo 23'	Stadium: National Olympic Stadium; Attendance: 21,267; Referee: Kenji Ogiya

1 January 2013 Final	Gamba Osaka	0–1	Kashiwa Reysol	Shinjuku
14:05 JST		Summary	Watanabe 35'	Stadium: National Olympic Stadium; Attendance: 46,480; Referee: Toshimitsu Yoshida

=== AFC Champions League ===
Pos	Team	Pld	W	D	L	GF	GA	GD	Pts	Qualification	GEG	KSR	JHM	BRU
1	(China) Guangzhou Evergrande	6	3	1	2	12	8	+4	10 (Note: Guangzhou Evergrande and Kashiwa Reysol are ranked by their head-to-head record (Guangzhou Evergrande: 4 pts; Kashiwa Reysol: 1 pt).)	Advance to knockout stage	—	3–1	1–3	1–2
2	(Japan) Kashiwa Reysol	6	3	1	2	11	7	+4	10	Advance to knockout stage	0–0	—	5–1	1–0
3	(South Korea) Jeonbuk Hyundai Motors	6	3	0	3	10	15	−5	9		1–5	0–2	—	3–2
4	(Thailand) Buriram United	6	2	0	4	8	11	−3	6		1–2	3–2	0–2	—

Source: WorldFootball.net
Notes:

7 March 2012 Group stage	Buriram United (Thailand)	3–2	(Japan) Kashiwa Reysol	Buriram
18:30 UTC+07:00	Jirawat 10', 77'; Jadigerov 38'	Report	Tanaka 55'; Sakai 64'	Stadium: Buriram Stadium; Attendance: 15,089; Referee: (Uzbekistan) Ravshan Irmatov

21 March 2012 Group stage	Kashiwa Reysol (Japan)	5–1	(South Korea) Jeonbuk Hyundai Motors	Kashiwa
19:00 UTC+09:00	Nasu 40'; Leandro Domingues 45' (pen.) 45+2'; Tanaka 89'; Barada 90+3'	Report	Jin Kyung-Sun (yellow card) 45'; Huang Bowen 51'; Jung Hoon (yellow card) 54'; Park Won-Jae (yellow card) 64'; Choi Chul-Soon (yellow card) 85'	Stadium: Hitachi Kashiwa Soccer Stadium; Attendance: 8,175; Referee: (Australia) Peter Green

4 April 2012 Group stage	Kashiwa Reysol (Japan)	0–0	(China) Guangzhou Evergrande	Kashiwa
19:00 UTC+09:00	Fukui (yellow card) 14'; Kurisawa (yellow card) 64'	Report		Stadium: Hitachi Kashiwa Soccer Stadium; Attendance: 8,787; Referee: (United Arab Emirates) Ali Hamad Madhad Saif Al Badwawi

17 April 2012 Group stage	Guangzhou Evergrande (China)	3–1	(Japan) Kashiwa Reysol	Guangzhou
19:30 UTC+08:00	Qin Sheng (yellow card) 8'; Conca 28' (pen.); Zhao Xuri (yellow card) 54'; Muriqui 57', 84'	Report	Watanabe (yellow card) 28'; Sakai 50' (yellow card) 74'	Stadium: Tianhe Stadium; Attendance: 40,000; Referee: (Qatar) Abdulrahman Abdou

1 May 2012 Group stage	Kashiwa Reysol (Japan)	1–0	(Thailand) Buriram United	Kashiwa
19:00 UTC+09:00	Ricardo Lobo (yellow card) 15'; Leandro Domingues 23' (yellow card) 23'	report	Ekwalla (yellow card) 4' (yellow-red card) 41'; Chalermpong Kerdkaew (yellow card) 90'	Stadium: Hitachi Kashiwa Soccer Stadium; Attendance: 8,099; Referee: (Saudi Arabia) Khalil Al Ghamdi

15 May 2012 Group stage	Jeonbuk Hyundai Motors (South Korea)	0–2	(Japan) Kashiwa Reysol	Jeonju
19:00 UTC+09:00	Jin Kyung-Sun (yellow card) 53'; Park Won-Jae (yellow card) 75'	Report	Leandro Domingues 49'; Tanaka 62'; Otani (yellow card) 67'; Masushima (yellow card) 90+2'	Stadium: Jeonju World Cup Stadium; Attendance: 11,459; Referee: (Bahrain) Ali Abdulnabi

==== Knockout stages ====
30 May 2012 Last 16	(South Korea) Ulsan Hyundai	3–2	(Japan) Kashiwa Reysol	Ulsan
20:30	Kim Shin-Wook 55' (yellow card) 59'; Kondo 72' (o.g.); Lee Keun-Ho 89'	Report	Sakai (yellow card) 21'; Leandro Domingues (yellow card) 61' (goal) 68'; Tanaka 90+2'	Stadium: Big Crown; Attendance: 14,341; Referee: (United Arab Emirates) Mohamed Abdelkarim Mohamed Ismail Al Zarouni

== Squad statistics ==
=== Appearances and goals ===
No.	Pos	Nat	Player	Total		J-League		J-League Cup		Emperor's Cup		Champions League	
No.	Pos	Nat	Player	Apps	Goals	Apps	Goals	Apps	Goals	Apps	Goals	Apps	Goals
3	DF	(Japan) JPN	Naoya Kondo	41	2	26+2	2	4+0	0	5+0	0	4+0	0
5	DF	(Japan) JPN	Tatsuya Masushima	46	5	30+0	4	3+1	0	5+0	1	7+0	0
6	DF	(Japan) JPN	Daisuke Nasu	34	1	20+3	0	3+0	0	5+0	0	3+0	1
7	MF	(Japan) JPN	Hidekazu Otani	47	1	30+1	1	4+0	0	6+0	0	6+0	0
8	FW	(Japan) JPN	Masakatsu Sawa	38	8	14+12	6	2+1	0	3+3	2	0+3	0
10	MF	(Brazil) BRA	Leandro Domingues	40	21	28+0	10	3+0	4	2+0	2	7+0	5
11	FW	(Brazil) BRA	Neto Baiano	15	3	3+8	1	0+2	1	1+1	1	0+0	0
14	DF	(South Korea) KOR	Kweon Han-Jin	4	1	3+1	1	0+0	0	0+0	0	0+0	0
15	MF	(Brazil) BRA	Jorge Wagner	48	9	31+2	8	3+0	1	5+0	0	7+0	0
16	GK	(Japan) JPN	Koji Inada	5	0	4+0	0	0+0	0	0+0	0	1+0	0
17	MF	(North Korea) PRK	Ahn Young-Hak	10	0	2+4	0	0+1	0	0+1	0	1+1	0
18	MF	(Japan) JPN	Junya Tanaka	45	11	18+12	5	1+2	0	3+3	2	5+1	4
19	FW	(Japan) JPN	Masato Kudo	48	17	27+6	13	4+0	2	5+0	2	4+2	0
20	MF	(Japan) JPN	Akimi Barada	43	2	19+10	0	2+2	1	4+0	0	4+2	1
21	GK	(Japan) JPN	Takanori Sugeno	46	0	30+0	0	4+0	0	6+0	0	6+0	0
22	DF	(Japan) JPN	Wataru Hashimoto	37	1	25+0	1	3+1	0	5+0	0	3+0	0
23	DF	(Japan) JPN	Hirofumi Watanabe	10	0	3+2	0	1+0	0	1+1	0	2+0	0
26	DF	(Japan) JPN	Ryoji Fukui	4	0	2+1	0	0+0	0	0+0	0	1+0	0
27	DF	(Japan) JPN	Masato Fujita	22	0	12+2	0	2+1	0	3+1	0	1+0	0
28	MF	(Japan) JPN	Ryoichi Kurisawa	37	0	21+5	0	3+0	0	3+1	0	4+0	0
29	MF	(Japan) JPN	Koki Mizuno	21	1	4+10	1	2+0	0	2+2	0	0+1	0
30	FW	(Japan) JPN	Ryosuke Yamanaka	2	0	0+0	0	0+0	0	2+0	0	0+0	0
Players who appeared for Kashiwa Reysol that left on loan during the season:
9	FW	(Japan) JPN	Hideaki Kitajima	6	1	3+1	1	0+0	0	0+0	0	2+0	0
11	FW	(Japan) JPN	Ryohei Hayashi	6	0	0+4	0	0+0	0	0+0	0	0+2	0
25	FW	(Brazil) BRA	Ricardo Lobo	12	0	4+3	0	0+0	0	0+0	0	2+3	0
Players who appeared for Kashiwa Reysol that left during the season:
4	DF	(Japan) JPN	Hiroki Sakai	22	3	15+0	1	0+0	0	0+0	0	7+0	2

=== Top scorers ===
Place	Position	Nation	Number	Name	J-League	J-League Cup	Emperor's Cup	Champions League	Super Cup	Total
1	FW	(Brazil)	10	Leandro Domingues	10	4	2	5	1	22
2	FW	(Japan)	19	Masato Kudo	13	1	2	0	0	17
3	MF	(Japan)	18	Junya Tanaka	5	0	2	4	0	11
4	MF	(Brazil)	15	Jorge Wagner	8	1	0	0	1	10
5	FW	(Japan)	8	Masakatsu Sawa	6	0	2	0	0	8
6	DF	(Japan)	5	Tatsuya Masushima	4	0	1	0	0	5
7	DF	(Japan)	3	Naoya Kondo	2	1	0	0	0	3
7	DF	(Japan)	4	Hiroki Sakai	1	0	0	2	0	3
7	FW	(Brazil)	11	Neto Baiano	1	1	1	0	0	3
10	MF	(Japan)	20	Akimi Barada	0	1	0	1	0	2
10				Own goal	2	0	0	0	0	2
12	FW	(Japan)	9	Hideaki Kitajima	1	0	0	0	0	1
12	DF	(Japan)	22	Wataru Hashimoto	1	0	0	0	0	1
12	MF	(Japan)	29	Koki Mizuno	1	0	0	0	0	1
12	MF	(Japan)	7	Hidekazu Otani	1	0	0	0	0	1
12	DF	(South Korea)	14	Kweon Han-Jin	1	0	0	0	0	1
12	DF	(Japan)	23	Hirofumi Watanabe	0	0	1	0	0	1
12	DF	(Japan)	6	Daisuke Nasu	0	0	0	1	0	1
				TOTALS	57	9	11	13	2	92

=== Disciplinary record ===
Number	Nation	Position	Name	J-League		J. League Cup		Emperor's Cup		Champions League		Total	
Number	Nation	Position	Name	Yellow card	Red card	Yellow card	Red card	Yellow card	Red card	Yellow card	Red card	Yellow card	Red card
3	(Japan)	DF	Naoya Kondo	2	1	0	0	0	0	0	0	2	1
4	(Japan)	DF	Hiroki Sakai	5	0	0	0	0	0	2	0	7	0
5	(Japan)	DF	Tatsuya Masushima	8	0	0	0	0	0	1	0	9	0
6	(Japan)	DF	Daisuke Nasu	3	0	1	0	1	0	0	0	5	0
7	(Japan)	MF	Hidekazu Otani	6	0	0	0	1	0	1	0	8	0
8	(Japan)	FW	Masakatsu Sawa	3	0	1	0	0	0	0	0	4	0
10	(Brazil)	MF	Leandro Domingues	9	2	1	0	0	2	0	0	12	2
11	(Brazil)	FW	Neto Baiano	3	0	0	0	0	0	0	0	3	0
14	(South Korea)	DF	Kweon Han-Jin	1	0	0	0	0	0	0	0	1	0
15	(Brazil)	MF	Jorge Wagner	5	1	0	0	1	0	0	0	6	1
17	(North Korea)	MF	Ahn Young-Hak	2	0	0	0	1	0	0	0	3	0
18	(Japan)	MF	Junya Tanaka	3	0	0	0	0	0	0	0	3	0
19	(Japan)	FW	Masato Kudo	2	0	0	0	2	0	0	0	4	0
20	(Japan)	MF	Akimi Barada	4	0	2	0	2	0	0	0	8	0
21	(Japan)	GK	Takanori Sugeno	2	0	1	0	1	0	0	0	4	0
22	(Japan)	DF	Wataru Hashimoto	4	0	0	0	2	0	1	0	7	0
23	(Japan)	DF	Hirofumi Watanabe	1	0	0	0	0	0	0	0	1	0
25	(Brazil)	FW	Ricardo Lobo	3	0	0	0	0	0	1	0	4	0
26	(Japan)	DF	Ryoji Fukui	0	0	0	0	0	0	0	0	1	0
27	(Japan)	DF	Masato Fujita	6	0	0	0	1	0	0	0	7	0
28	(Japan)	MF	Ryoichi Kurisawa	4	0	2	0	1	0	1	0	3	0
30	(Japan)	FW	Ryosuke Yamanaka	0	0	0	0	1	0	0	0	3	0
			TOTALS	76	4	8	0	14	0	11	0	109	4
