= List of Kashiwa Reysol records and statistics =

This article contains records and statistics for the Japanese professional football club, Kashiwa Reysol.

== J.League ==
Season	League	Place	GP	Pts	Win	Draw	Lose	Average Crowd
1995	J1 1st stage	14 / 14	26	22	7	-	19	16,102
1995	J1 2nd stage	5 / 14	26	43	14	-	12	16,102
1995	J1 Total	12 / 14	52	65	21	-	31	16,102
1996	J1	5 / 16	30	60	20	-	10	13,033
1997	J1 1st stage	3 / 17	16	32	11	-	5	8,664
1997	J1 2nd stage	10 / 17	16	20	7	-	9	8,664
1997	J1 Total	7 / 17	32	52	18	-	14	8,664
1998	J1 1st stage	10 / 18	17	22	9	-	8	9,932
1998	J1 2nd stage	8 / 18	17	25	9	-	8	9,932
1998	J1 Total	8 / 18	34	47	18	-	16	9,932
1999	J1 1st stage	4 / 16	15	29	10	0	5	10,122
1999	J1 2nd stage	4 / 16	15	29	10	1	4	10,122
1999	J1 Total	3 / 16	30	58	20	1	9	10,122
2000	J1 1st stage	4 / 16	15	26	10	0	5	10,037
2000	J1 2nd stage	Runners-up / 16	15	32	11	1	3	10,037
2000	J1 Total	3 / 16	30	58	21	1	8	10,037
2001	J1 1st stage	6 / 16	15	22	8	0	7	12,477
2001	J1 2nd stage	7 / 16	15	21	6	3	6	12,477
2001	J1 Total	6 / 16	30	43	14	3	13	12,477
2002	J1 1st stage	14 / 16	15	11	4	0	11	11,314
2002	J1 2nd stage	9 / 16	15	21	6	3	6	11,314
2002	J1 Total	12 / 16	30	32	10	3	17	11,314
2003	J1 1st stage	9 / 16	15	21	6	3	6	10,873
2003	J1 2nd stage	11 / 16	15	16	3	7	5	10,873
2003	J1 Total	12 / 16	30	37	9	10	11	10,873
2004	J1 1st stage	15 / 16	15	12	3	3	9	10,513
2004	J1 2nd stage	15 / 16	15	13	2	7	6	10,513
2004	J1 Total	16 / 16	30	25	5	10	15	10,513
2005	J1	16 / 18	34	35	8	11	15	12,492
2006	J2	Runners-up / 13	48	88	27	7	14	8,328
2007	J1	8 / 18	34	50	14	8	12	12,967
2008	J1	11 / 18	34	46	13	7	14	12,308
2009	J1	16 / 18	34	34	7	13	14	11,738
2010	J2	Champions / 18	36	80	23	11	2	8,098

Key to colors
Played in 1st division league
Played in 2nd division league

== Domestic cup competitions ==
Year	Emperor's Cup	J. League Cup
1993	1st Round	Group Stage
1994	Didn't qualify	1st Round
1995	2nd Round	Not Held
1996	4th Round	Semi-finals
1997	Quarter-finals	Quarter-finals
1998	4th Round	Group Stage
1999	Semi-finals	Champions
2000	4th Round	2nd Round
2001	3rd Round	2nd Round
2002	3rd Round	Quarter-finals
2003	4th Round	Group Stage
2004	4th Round	Group Stage
2005	5th Round	Group Stage
2006	4th Round	-
2007	4th Round	Group Stage
2008	Runners-up	Group Stage
2009	3rd Round	Group Stage
2010	4th Round	-
2011	4th Round	1st Round
2012	Champions	Semi-finals
2013	4th Round	Champions
2014		

== Top scorers by season ==
Season	Player	Total goals	Ref
2010	(Brazil) Leandro Domingues	17	
2011	(Brazil) Leandro Domingues	18	
2012	(Brazil) Leandro Domingues	20	
