= Junya Tanaka =

Japanese footballer

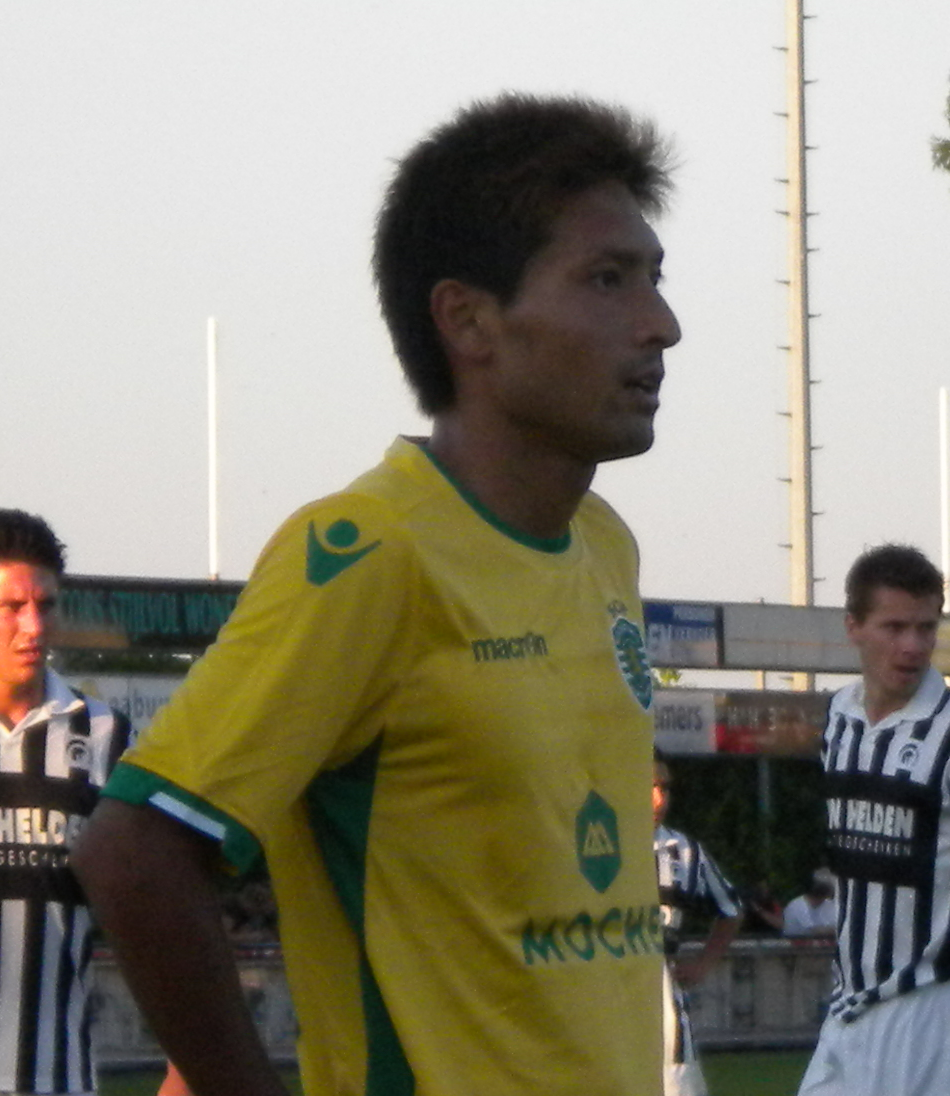
- Tanaka with Sporting CP in 2014

Personal information
- Full name: Junya Tanaka
- Date of birth: 15 July 1987 (age 39)
- Place of birth: Itabashi, Tokyo, Japan
- Height: 1.80 m (5 ft 11 in)
- Positions: Forward; midfielder

Youth career
- 2000–2005: Mitsubishi Yowa

College career
Years	Team	Apps	(Gls)
2006–2009	Juntendo University		

Senior career*
Years	Team	Apps	(Gls)
2009–2014	Kashiwa Reysol	138	(40)
2014–2016	Sporting CP	20	(5)
2016	→ Kashiwa Reysol (loan)	21	(4)
2017–2021	Vissel Kobe	93	(13)
2022–2023	FC Gifu	48	(6)

International career
2012–2014	Japan	4	(0)
Medal record
Kashiwa Reysol
Winner	J1 League	2011
Winner	J.League Cup	2013
Winner	Emperor's Cup	2012
- * Club domestic league appearances and goals

Junya Tanaka (田中 順也, Tanaka Jun'ya; born 15 July 1987) is a Japanese former professional footballer.

== Career ==
He played 9 games for Kashiwa Reysol in 2009 as a specially-designated player during his graduation year at Juntendo University. After spending nearly six years playing for Reysol, he signed a five-year deal with Primeira Liga side Sporting CP on 29 June 2014.

== Personal life ==
On 21 December 2013, Tanaka married model Manami Ui, and on 16 July 2014, they welcomed the birth of their first child.

== Career statistics ==
=== Club ===
Updated to 19 December 2020.

Club	Season	League		Cup^{1}		League Cup^{2}		Continental^{3}		Other^{4}		Total	
Club	Season	Apps	Goals	Apps	Goals	Apps	Goals	Apps	Goals	Apps	Goals	Apps	Goals
Kashiwa Reysol
Kashiwa Reysol	2009	9	0	0	0	0	0	-		0	0	9	0
Kashiwa Reysol	2010	24	6	3	1	-		-		0	0	27	7
Kashiwa Reysol	2011	30	13	3	2	2	0	-		4	1	39	16
Kashiwa Reysol	2012	31	5	6	2	3	0	6	4	1	0	47	11
Kashiwa Reysol	2013	32	11	0	0	4	3	9	2	1	0	46	16
Kashiwa Reysol	2014	12	5	-		6	3	-		-		18	8
Kashiwa Reysol	2016	21	4	1	0	4	1	-		-		23	4
Kashiwa Reysol	Total	159	44	13	5	19	7	15	6	6	1	209	62
Sporting CP
Sporting CP	2014–15	17	5	4	1	5	1	2	0	0	0	28	7
Sporting CP	2015–16	3	0	0	0	2	0	1	0	0	0	6	0
Sporting CP	Total	20	5	4	1	7	1	3	0	0	0	34	7
Vissel Kobe
Vissel Kobe	2017	24	1	1	0	7	4	-		-		32	5
Vissel Kobe	2018	20	2	2	0	2	0	-		-		24	2
Vissel Kobe	2019	23	6	6	4	6	1	-		-		35	11
Vissel Kobe	2020	19	2	-		0	0	4	0	1	0	24	2
Vissel Kobe	Total	86	11	9	4	15	5	4	0	1	0	115	20
Career total		265	60	26	10	41	13	22	6	7	1	361	90

^{1}Includes Emperor's Cup.

^{2}Includes J. League Cup.

^{3}Includes AFC Champions League.

^{4}Includes FIFA Club World Cup and Japanese Super Cup.

=== International ===
Japan national team
Year	Apps	Goals
2012	1	0
2013	0	0
2014	3	0
Total	4	0

== Honours ==
Kashiwa Reysol

- J1 League: 2011
- J2 League: 2010
- Emperor's Cup: 2012
- J.League Cup: 2013
- Japanese Super Cup: 2012

Sporting

- Taça de Portugal: 2014–15
- Supertaça Cândido de Oliveira: 2015

Vissel Kobe

- Emperor's Cup: 2019
- Japanese Super Cup: 2020
