= Akimi =

- Gender: Both

Origin
- Origin: Japanese
- Meaning: Different meanings depending on the kanji used

Akimi (written: 陽生 or 秋生) is a unisex Japanese given name. Notable people with the name include:

- Akimi Barada (茨田 陽生; born 1991), Japanese footballer
- Akimi Yoshida (吉田 秋生; born 1956), Japanese manga artist
