= Ryosuke Yamanaka =

Japanese footballer

Ryosuke Yamanaka 山中 亮輔
Personal information
- Full name: Ryosuke Yamanaka
- Date of birth: 20 April 1993 (age 33)
- Place of birth: Kashiwa, Chiba, Japan
- Height: 1.71 m (5 ft 7 in)
- Position: Left back

Team information
- Current team: Kyoto Sanga
- Number: 66

Youth career
- 2000–2001: Kashiwa Effort
- 2003–2011: Kashiwa Reysol

Senior career*
Years	Team	Apps	(Gls)
2012–2016	Kashiwa Reysol	35	(1)
2014	→ JEF United Chiba (loan)	23	(3)
2015	→ J. League U-22 (loan)	4	(0)
2017–2018	Yokohama F. Marinos	54	(5)
2019–2021	Urawa Red Diamonds	77	(2)
2022–2023	Cerezo Osaka	44	(0)
2024–2026	Nagoya Grampus	27	(1)
2026–	Kyoto Sanga	0	(0)

International career^{‡}
2011–2012	Japan U-19	25	(0)
2013	Japan U-22	6	(0)
2018–	Japan	2	(1)
Medal record
Kashiwa Reysol
Winner	J.League Cup	2013
Winner	Emperor's Cup	2012
Yokohama F. Marinos
Runner-up	J.League Cup	2018
Runner-up	Emperor's Cup	2017
Representing Japan
AFC U-23 Championship
Gold medal – first place	2016 Qatar
- * Club domestic league appearances and goals as of 1 August 2026 ‡ National team caps and goals as of 9 June 2019

Ryosuke Yamanaka (山中 亮輔, Yamanaka Ryōsuke; born 20 April 1993) is a Japanese professional footballer who plays as a left back for J1 League club Kyoto Sanga.

== Career ==
On 20 February 2010, Yamanaka was registered to the team as a type-2 player. On 27 December 2011, he was promoted to the first team of Kashiwa Reysol for the 2012 season. After playing 450 minutes for Kashiwa Reysol, Yamanaka signed a Professional A contract with the club.

On 28 December 2013, Yamanaka was announced at JEF United Chiba on a one year loan.

On 7 January 2015, Yamanaka returned to Kashiwa Reysol after his loan with JEF United Chiba expired. Then manager Tatsuma Yoshida was quoted as saying "We have Yamanaka." and said that he "basically tried to stop" Yamanaka from leaving on loan last season.

On 18 November 2016, Yamanaka was announced at Yokohama F. Marinos.

On 10 January 2019, Yamanaka was announced at Urawa Reds on a permanent transfer.

On 26 December 2021, Yamanaka was announced at Cerezo Osaka.

On 20 December 2023, Yamanaka was announced at Nagoya Grampus on a permanent transfer. During his time at Nagoya Grampus, he won the 2024 J.League Cup.

== International career ==
He made his Japan national football team debut on 20 November 2018 in a friendly against Kyrgyzstan and scored a goal in the second minute of the eventual 4–0 victory. The goal was the fastest goal scored by a Japanese player in the history of the national team.

== Style of play ==
Yamanaka's former teammate Adam Taggart described his crosses as "unbelievable".

== Club statistics ==
Updated to 22 October 2022.

Club	Season	League			Emperor's Cup		J. League Cup		AFC		Other^{1}		Total	
Club	Season	Division	Apps	Goals	Apps	Goals	Apps	Goals	Apps	Goals	Apps	Goals	Apps	Goals
Kashiwa Reysol U-18	2011		0	0	1	0	-		-		-		1	0
Kashiwa Reysol	2012	J. League Division 1	1	0	2	0	0	0	0	0	0	0	3	0
Kashiwa Reysol	2013	J. League Division 1	10	0	2	0	2	0	1	0	1	0	16	0
JEF United Chiba	2014	J. League Division 2	23	3	2	0	-		-		-		25	3
Kashiwa Reysol	2015	J1 League	11	0	1	0	2	0	5	0	–		19	0
Kashiwa Reysol	2016	J1 League	13	1	1	0	1	0	–		–		15	1
Yokohama F. Marinos	2017	J1 League	22	1	4	0	4	0	–		–		30	1
Yokohama F. Marinos	2018	J1 League	32	4	2	0	5	0	–		–		39	4
Urawa Red Diamonds	2019	J1 League	22	0	2	0	0	0	5	0	1	0	30	0
Urawa Red Diamonds	2020	J1 League	31	2	–		1	0	–		–		32	2
Urawa Red Diamonds	2021	J1 League	24	0	3	0	7	0	–		–		34	0
Cerezo Osaka	2022	J1 League	23	0	2	0	10	0	–		–		35	0
Cerezo Osaka	2023	J1 League	0	0	0	0	0	0	–		–		0	0
Career total			212	22	22	0	32	0	11	0	2	0	279	11

^{1}Includes Japanese Super Cup.

== National team statistics ==
As of 11 November 2012

National team	Year	Apps	Goals
Japan U18
Japan U18	2011	3	0
Japan U19
Japan U19	2012	4	0

Japan national team
Year	Apps	Goals
2018	1	1
2019	1	0
Total	2	1

International appearances and goals
#	Date	Venue	Opponent	Result	Goal	Competition
2011
	31 October	Thai-Japanese Stadium, Bangkok, Thailand	Guam U18	26–0	0	2012 AFC U-19 Championship qualification / Japan U18
	5 November	Thephasadin Stadium, Bangkok, Thailand	Chinese Taipei U18	5–0	0	2012 AFC U-19 Championship qualification / Japan U18
	7 November	Thephasadin Stadium, Bangkok, Thailand	Thailand U18	0–0	0	2012 AFC U-19 Championship qualification / Japan U18
2012
	3 November	Emirates Club Stadium, Ras al-Khaimah, UAE	Iran U-19	0–2	0	2012 AFC U-19 Championship / Japan U19
	5 November	Emirates Club Stadium, Ras al-Khaimah, UAE	Kuwait U-19	1–0	0	2012 AFC U-19 Championship / Japan U19
	7 November	Emirates Club Stadium, Ras al-Khaimah, UAE	United Arab Emirates U-19	0–0	0	2012 AFC U-19 Championship / Japan U19
	11 November	Emirates Club Stadium, Ras al-Khaimah, UAE	Iraq U-19	1–2	0	2012 AFC U-19 Championship / Japan U19

=== International goals ===
Scores and results list Japan's goal tally first.

No.	Date	Venue	Opponent	Score	Result	Competition
1.	20 November 2018	Toyota Stadium, Toyota, Japan	Kyrgyzstan	1–0	4–0	2018 Kirin Challenge Cup

== Honours ==
Kashiwa Reysol

- Emperor's Cup: 2012
- Japanese Super Cup: 2012
- J. League Cup: 2013

Nagoya Grampus

- J.League Cup: 2024
