= Hideaki Kitajima =

Japanese footballer

Hideaki Kitajima 北嶋 秀朗
Personal information
- Full name: Hideaki Kitajima
- Date of birth: 23 May 1978 (age 48)
- Place of birth: Narashino, Chiba, Japan
- Height: 1.82 m (6 ft 0 in)
- Position: Forward

Team information
- Current team: Criacao Shinjuku (manager from 2024)

Youth career
- 1994–1996: Funabashi High School

Senior career*
Years	Team	Apps	(Gls)
1997–2002	Kashiwa Reysol	108	(36)
2003–2005	Shimizu S-Pulse	48	(7)
2006–2012	Kashiwa Reysol	115	(27)
2012–2013	Roasso Kumamoto	32	(3)
Total		303	(73)

International career
2000	Japan	3	(1)

Managerial career
- 2024–: Criacao Shinjuku
Medal record
Kashiwa Reysol
Winner	J1 League	2011
Winner	J.League Cup	1999
Winner	Emperor's Cup	2012
Runner-up	Emperor's Cup	2008
Shimizu S-Pulse
Runner-up	Emperor's Cup	2005
Representing Japan
AFC Asian Cup
Gold medal – first place	2000 Lebanon
- * Club domestic league appearances and goals

Hideaki Kitajima (北嶋 秀朗, Kitajima Hideaki; born May 23, 1978) is a former Japanese football player and last play for Japan national team. He's to set manager of JFL club, Criacao Shinjuku from 2024.

== Club career ==
Kitajima was born in Narashino on May 23, 1978. After graduating from high school, he joined Kashiwa Reysol in 1997. In 1999, he played many matches and the club won J.League Cup. The club also won the 3rd place 1999 and 2000 J1 League. However his opportunity to play decreased, he moved to Shimizu S-Pulse in 2003. He returned to Kashiwa Reysol in 2006. In 2011, the club won the champions 2011 J1 League. He moved to Roasso Kumamoto in June 2012. He retired end of 2013 season.

== International career ==
In October 2000, Kitajima was selected Japan national team for 2000 Asian Cup. At this competition, on October 17, he debuted and scored a goal against Uzbekistan. He played 2 games and Japan won the champions. He played 3 games and scored 1 goal for Japan in 2000.

== Managerial career ==
On 16 November 2023, Kitajima appointment manager of JFL club Criacao Shinjuku for upcoming 2024 season.

== Club statistics ==
Club	Season	League		Emperor's Cup		J.League Cup		Asia		Other^{1}		Total	
Club	Season	Apps	Goals	Apps	Goals	Apps	Goals	Apps	Goals	Apps	Goals	Apps	Goals
Kashiwa Reysol	1997	6	0	0	0	0	0	-		-		6	0
Kashiwa Reysol	1998	9	2	0	0	3	0	-		-		12	2
Kashiwa Reysol	1999	17	7	4	2	6	2	-		-		27	11
Kashiwa Reysol	2000	30	18	2	0	2	0	-		-		34	18
Kashiwa Reysol	2001	28	7	1	0	4	1	-		-		33	8
Kashiwa Reysol	2002	18	2	1	1	6	0	-		-		25	3
Kashiwa Reysol	Total	108	36	8	3	21	3	-		-		137	42
Shimizu S-Pulse	2003	18	2	2	0	2	0	2	1	-		24	3
Shimizu S-Pulse	2004	27	5	0	0	7	0	-		-		34	5
Shimizu S-Pulse	2005	3	0	2	0	1	1	-		-		6	1
Shimizu S-Pulse	Total	48	7	4	0	10	1	2	1	-		64	9
Kashiwa Reysol	2006	24	7	0	0	-		-		-		24	7
Kashiwa Reysol	2007	12	1	1	0	0	0	-		-		13	1
Kashiwa Reysol	2008	12	1	1	0	3	0	-		-		16	1
Kashiwa Reysol	2009	22	4	2	0	5	2	-		-		29	6
Kashiwa Reysol	2010	17	4	2	0	-		-		-		19	4
Kashiwa Reysol	2011	23	9	3	1	2	1	-		3	0	31	11
Kashiwa Reysol	2012	5	1	0	0	0	0	2	0	1	0	8	1
Kashiwa Reysol	Total	115	27	9	1	10	3	0	0	4	0	140	31
Roasso Kumamoto	2012	8	3	2	0	-		-		-		10	3
Roasso Kumamoto	2013	24	0	0	0	-		-		-		24	0
Roasso Kumamoto	Total	32	3	2	0	-		-		-		34	3

^{1}Includes FIFA Club World Cup and Japanese Super Cup.

== International statistics ==
Japan national team
Year	Apps	Goals
2000	3	1
Total	3	1

International appearances and goals
#	Date	Venue	Opponent	Result	Goal	Competition
2000
1.	17 October	Saida Municipal Stadium, Sidon, Lebanon	Uzbekistan	8–1	1	2000 AFC Asian Cup
2.	20 October	Sports City Stadium, Beirut, Lebanon	Qatar	1–1	0	2000 AFC Asian Cup
3.	20 December	National Stadium, Tokyo, Japan	South Korea	1–1	0	Friendly Match

== Managerial statistics ==
As of the start from 2024 season

Managerial record by club and tenure
Team	From	To	Record				
Team	From	To	G	W	D	L	Win %
Criacao Shinjuku	16 November 2023	present	0	0	0	0	—
Total			0	0	0	0	—

== Honours ==
Kashiwa Reysol

- J.League Cup : 1999
- J2 League : 2010
- J1 League : 2011
- Japanese Super Cup : 2012

Japan National Team

- AFC Asian Cup : 2000
