= Akimi Barada =

Japanese footballer

Akimi Barada 茨田 陽生
Personal information
- Full name: Akimi Barada
- Date of birth: 30 May 1991 (age 35)
- Place of birth: Urayasu, Chiba, Japan
- Height: 1.73 m (5 ft 8 in)
- Position: Attacking midfielder

Team information
- Current team: Shonan Bellmare
- Number: 14

Youth career
- 1997–2000: FC Urayasu Blue Wings
- 2001–2009: Kashiwa Reysol

Senior career*
Years	Team	Apps	(Gls)
2009–2016	Kashiwa Reysol	179	(7)
2017–2019	Omiya Ardija	105	(12)
2020–	Shonan Bellmare	148	(2)

International career
2009	Japan U18	1	(0)
2011	Japan U22	1	(0)
Medal record
Kashiwa Reysol
Winner	J1 League	2011
Winner	J.League Cup	2013
Winner	Emperor's Cup	2012
- * Club domestic league appearances and goals as of 16 September 2025

Akimi Barada (茨田 陽生, born 30 May 1991) is a Japanese football player. He currently plays for Shonan Bellmare.

== Career statistics ==
=== Club ===
Updated to end of 2018 season

Club	Season	League		Emperor's Cup		J. League Cup		ACL		Other^{1}		Total	
Club	Season	Apps	Goals	Apps	Goals	Apps	Goals	Apps	Goals	Apps	Goals	Apps	Goals
Kashiwa Reysol	2009	0	0	0	0	2	0	-		-		2	0
Kashiwa Reysol	2010	26	3	2	1	-		-		-		28	4
Kashiwa Reysol	2011	27	1	1	0	0	0	-		2	0	30	1
Kashiwa Reysol	2012	28	0	4	0	4	1	6	1	1	0	43	2
Kashiwa Reysol	2013	23	0	2	0	2	0	7	0	1	0	35	0
Kashiwa Reysol	2014	23	1	2	0	8	1	-		0	0	33	2
Kashiwa Reysol	2015	28	0	2	0	1	0	10	1	-		41	1
Kashiwa Reysol	2016	24	2	2	0	4	0	-		-		30	2
Omiya Ardija	2017	30	1	1	0	2	0	-		-		33	1
Omiya Ardija	2018	36	6	2	1	-		-		-		38	7
Total		245	14	18	2	23	2	23	2	4	0	313	20

^{1}Includes FIFA Club World Cup and Japanese Super Cup.

=== International ===
As of 10 August 2011

National team	Year	Apps	Goals
Japan U18
Japan U18	2009	1	0
Japan U22
Japan U22	2011	1	0

International appearances and goals
#	Date	Venue	Opponent	Result	Goal	Competition
2009
	14 November	Jalak Harupat Soreang Stadium, Bandung, Indonesia	Singapore U18	2–0	0	2010 AFC U-19 Championship qualification / Japan U18
2011
	10 August	Sapporo Dome, Sapporo, Japan	Egypt U22	2–1	0	Friendly / Japan U22

== Honours ==
=== Club ===
Kashiwa Reysol

- J. League Division 1 : 2011
- J. League Division 2 : 2010
- Emperor's Cup : 2012
- Japanese Super Cup : 2012
- J. League Cup : 2013
- Suruga Bank Championship : 2014
