= 2012 Japanese Super Cup =

Association football championship game in Japan

| Kashiwa Reysol | F.C. Tokyo |
| 2 | 1 |
- Date: 3 March 2012
- Venue: National Olympic Stadium, Tokyo
- Man of the Match: Leandro Domingues (Kashiwa Reysol)
- Referee: Yuichi Nishimura
- Attendance: 35,453

The 2012 Japanese Super Cup was a football competition held on 3 March 2012 between the 2011 J. League champions Kashiwa Reysol and the 2011 Emperor's Cup winner F.C. Tokyo. Kashiwa Reysol won the match 2–1 in regulation time.

== Background ==
This was the first time both teams had participated in the competition. Kashiwa, having won its first League title since 1972 (when no Super Cup was played) and FC Tokyo, having become the third club to win both the second-tier title and the Emperor's Cup since Yamaha (Júbilo Iwata) in 1982, both had qualified to the Asian Champions League by virtue of winning their titles.

== Match ==
3 March 2012
13:35 JST

| Kashiwa Reysol | 2–1 | FC Tokyo |
|---|---|---|
| Wagner 27'; Leandro 45' (pen.) | Report | 64' Aria |

National Olympic Stadium, Tokyo
Attendance: 35,453
Referee: (Japan) Yuichi Nishimura

| Kashiwa Reysol | FC Tokyo |

KASHIWA REYSOL (4-4-2):
| GK | 21 | (Japan) Takanori Sugeno |
| RB | 4 | (Japan) Hiroki Sakai |
| CB | 5 | (Japan) Tatsuya Masushima |
| CB | 3 | (Japan) Naoya Kondo |
| LB | 22 | (Japan) Wataru Hashimoto |
| RM | 20 | (Japan) Akimi Barada | (yellow card) 39' |
| LM | 7 | (Japan) Hidekazu Otani | | (substituted off) 81' |
| RW | 10 | (Brazil) Leandro Domigues | 45' (pen.) |
| LW | 15 | (Brazil) Jorge Wagner | 27' |
| CF | 18 | (Japan) Junya Tanaka | | (substituted off) 68' |
| CF | 9 | (Japan) Hideaki Kitajima | | (substituted off) 68' |
Substitutes:
| GK | 16 | (Japan) Koji Inada |
| CM | 17 | (North Korea) An Yong-Hak | | (substituted in) 81' |
| CB | 6 | (Japan) Daisuke Nasu |
| AM | 8 | (Japan) Masakatsu Sawa | | (substituted in) 68' |
| RW | 29 | (Japan) Koki Mizuno |
| CF | 19 | (Japan) Masato Kudo |
| CF | 25 | (Brazil) Ricardo Lobo | | (substituted in) 68' |
Manager:
(Brazil) Nelsinho Baptista

FC TOKYO (4-2-3-1):
| GK | 1 | (Japan) Hitoshi Shiota |
| RB | 33 | (Japan) Kenta Mukuhara |
| CB | 2 | (Japan) Yuhei Tokunaga |
| CB | 3 | (Japan) Masato Morishige |
| LB | 6 | (Japan) Kosuke Ota |
| RM | 10 | (Japan) Yohei Kajiyama |
| AM | 8 | (Japan) Aria Jasuru Hasegawa | 64' |
| LM | 4 | (Japan) Hideto Takahashi | | (substituted off) 84' |
| RW | 18 | (Japan) Naohiro Ishikawa | | (substituted off) 57' |
| LW | 39 | (Japan) Tatsuya Yazawa | (yellow card) 50' | (substituted off) 72' |
| CF | 49 | (Brazil) Lucas Severino |
Substitutes:
| GK | 20 | (Japan) Shuichi Gonda |
| CB | 5 | (Japan) Kenichi Kaga |
| RW | 17 | (Japan) Hiroki Kawano | | (substituted in) 84' |
| AM | 22 | (Japan) Naotake Hanyu | | (substituted in) 72' |
| CM | 27 | (Japan) Sotan Tanabe |
| CF | 11 | (Japan) Kazuma Watanabe | | (substituted in) 57' |
| CF | 13 | (Japan) Sōta Hirayama |
Manager:
(Serbia) Ranko Popović

Man of the Match:
(Brazil) Leandro Domingues (Kashiwa Reysol)

Assistant referees:
(Japan) Toshiyuki Nagi
(Japan) Akane Yagi
Fourth official:
(Japan) Hiroyuki Kimura

== See also ==
- 2011 J. League Division 1
- 2011 Emperor's Cup
