= Ryohei Hayashi =

Japanese footballer

Ryohei Hayashi 林 陵平
Personal information
- Full name: Ryohei Hayashi
- Date of birth: September 8, 1986 (age 40)
- Place of birth: Hachiōji, Tokyo, Japan
- Height: 1.86 m (6 ft 1 in)
- Position: Forward

Youth career
- 2005–2008: Meiji University FC

Senior career*
Years	Team	Apps	(Gls)
2009	Tokyo Verdy	32	(6)
2010–2012	Kashiwa Reysol	37	(11)
2012–2016	Montedio Yamagata	106	(22)
2017	Mito HollyHock	41	(14)
2018–2020	Tokyo Verdy	44	(12)
2019	→ Machida Zelvia (loan)	4	(0)
2020	→ Thespakusatsu Gunma (loan)	36	(2)

Managerial career
- 2021–: Tokyo University Association; Football Club
Medal record
Kashiwa Reysol
Winner	J1 League	2011
Winner	Emperor's Cup	2012
Montedio Yamagata
Runner-up	Emperor's Cup	2014
- * Club domestic league appearances and goals as of 1 March 2021

Ryohei Hayashi (林 陵平, Hayashi Ryōhei; born September 8, 1986) is a retired Japanese football player.

== Club statistics ==
Updated to 1 March 2021.

Club performance			League		Cup		League Cup		Total	
Season	Club	League	Apps	Goals	Apps	Goals	Apps	Goals	Apps	Goals
Japan			League		Emperor's Cup		J. League Cup		Total	
2009	Tokyo Verdy	J2 League	32	6	1	0	-		33	6
2010	Kashiwa Reysol	J2 League	24	10	2	1	-		26	11
2011	Kashiwa Reysol	J1 League	10	1	1	0	1	0	12	1
2012	Kashiwa Reysol	J1 League	3	0	-		-		3	0
2012	Montedio Yamagata	J2 League	16	2	2	1	-		18	3
2013	Montedio Yamagata	J2 League	34	12	2	1	-		36	13
2014	Montedio Yamagata	J2 League	3	0	2	0	-		5	0
2015	Montedio Yamagata	J1 League	23	2	0	0	4	0	27	2
2016	Montedio Yamagata	J2 League	30	6	2	2	-		32	8
2017	Mito HollyHock	J2 League	41	14	0	0	-		41	14
2018	Tokyo Verdy	J2 League	28	7	2	1	-		30	8
2019	Tokyo Verdy	J2 League	16	5	0	0	-		16	5
2019	Machida Zelvia	J2 League	4	0	-		-		4	0
2020	Tokyo Verdy	J2 League	0	0	-		-		0	0
2020	Thespakusatsu Gunma	J2 League	36	2	-		-		36	2
Total			300	67	14	6	5	0	319	73
