= Ryoji Fukui =

Japanese footballer

Ryoji Fukui 福井 諒司
Personal information
- Full name: Ryoji Fukui
- Date of birth: August 7, 1987 (age 39)
- Place of birth: Hyogo, Japan
- Height: 1.80 m (5 ft 11 in)
- Position: Defender

Youth career
- 2006–2009: Fukuoka University

Senior career*
Years	Team	Apps	(Gls)
2010	Tokyo Verdy	1	(0)
2011	Giravanz Kitakyushu	33	(3)
2012	Kashiwa Reysol	3	(0)
2013–2015	Tokyo Verdy	48	(2)
2016	Renofa Yamaguchi FC	0	(0)
2016	→ Mito HollyHock (loan)	19	(0)
2017–2018	Mito HollyHock	59	(1)
2019–2021	FC Ryukyu	66	(1)
Medal record
Kashiwa Reysol
Winner	Emperor's Cup	2012
- * Club domestic league appearances and goals

Ryoji Fukui (福井 諒司, born August 7, 1987) is a Japanese former football player.

== Career statistics ==
Updated to end of 2018 season.

Appearances and goals by club, season and competition
Club	Season	League			Emperor's Cup		J.League Cup		Asia		Total	
Club	Season	Division	Apps	Goals	Apps	Goals	Apps	Goals	Apps	Goals	Apps	Goals
Tokyo Verdy	2010	J2 League	1	0	0	0	—		—		1	0
Giravanz Kitakyushu	2011	J2 League	33	3	1	0	—		—		34	3
Kashiwa Reysol	2012	J1 League	3	0	0	0	0	0	1	0	4	0
Tokyo Verdy	2013	J2 League	27	1	2	0	—		—		29	1
Tokyo Verdy	2014	J2 League	2	1	0	0	—		—		2	1
Tokyo Verdy	2015	J2 League	19	0	0	0	—		—		19	0
Renofa Yamaguchi FC	2016	J2 League	0	0	0	0	—		—		0	0
Mito HollyHock	2016	J2 League	19	3	0	0	—		—		19	3
Mito HollyHock	2017	J2 League	38	1	0	0	—		—		38	1
Mito HollyHock	2018	J2 League	21	0	0	0	—		—		21	0
Career total			163	9	3	0	0	0	1	0	167	9
