= Takanori Sugeno =

Japanese footballer

Takanori Sugeno 菅野 孝憲
Personal information
- Full name: Takanori Sugeno
- Date of birth: 3 May 1984 (age 42)
- Place of birth: Fujimi, Saitama, Japan
- Height: 1.78 m (5 ft 10 in)
- Position: Goalkeeper

Team information
- Current team: Hokkaido Consadole Sapporo
- Number: 1

Youth career
- Kitahara SC
- 2000–2002: Tokyo Verdy

Senior career*
Years	Team	Apps	(Gls)
2003–2007	Yokohama FC	186	(1)
2008–2015	Kashiwa Reysol	236	(0)
2016–2019	Kyoto Sanga	73	(0)
2018–2019	→ Hokkaido Consadole Sapporo (loan)	1	(0)
2020–	Hokkaido Consadole Sapporo	154	(0)
Medal record
Kashiwa Reysol
Winner	J1 League	2011
Winner	J.League Cup	2013
Winner	Emperor's Cup	2012
Runner-up	Emperor's Cup	2008
- * Club domestic league appearances and goals as of 3 July 2026

Takanori Sugeno (菅野 孝憲, Sugeno Takanori; born 3 May 1984) is a Japanese football player who plays for Hokkaido Consadole Sapporo.

== Playing career ==
Although considered short for a goalkeeper, standing at 178 cm, he makes up for his lack of height with superb agility and reflexes.

In 2006, he was a part of the Yokohama FC defense that set a J.League record when they did not concede a goal for 770 consecutive minutes, breaking Shimizu S-Pulse's 731 minutes recorded in 1993. They also kept 7 consecutive clean sheets (which was also a tied J2 League record) en route to promotion to the J1 League.

In 2007, Sugeno was named J.league rookie of the year. In 2008, he was signed by Kashiwa Reysol, a move which some consider unwise as Kashiwa already have a good and relatively young goalkeeper in Yuta Minami.

== Club statistics ==
As of end of 2024 season

Club performance			League		Cup		League Cup		Asia		Total	
Season	Club	League	Apps	Goals	Apps	Goals	Apps	Goals	Apps	Goals	Apps	Goals
Japan			League		Emperor's Cup		J.League Cup		AFC		Total	
2003	Yokohama FC	J2 League	24	0	2	0	-		-		26	0
2004	Yokohama FC	J2 League	43	1	3	0	-		-		46	1
2005	Yokohama FC	J2 League	37	0	1	0	-		-		38	0
2006	Yokohama FC	J2 League	48	0	0	0	-		-		48	0
2007	Yokohama FC	J1 League	34	0	2	0	5	0	-		41	0
2008	Kashiwa Reysol	J1 League	24	0	4	0	5	0	-		33	0
2009	Kashiwa Reysol	J1 League	34	0	2	0	3	0	-		39	0
2010	Kashiwa Reysol	J2 League	35	0	3	0	-		-		38	0
2011	Kashiwa Reysol	J1 League	26	0	3	0	2	0	-		31	0
2012	Kashiwa Reysol	J1 League	30	0	6	0	4	0	6	0	46	0
2013	Kashiwa Reysol	J1 League	33	0	2	0	5	0	12	0	52	0
2014	Kashiwa Reysol	J1 League	24	0	2	0	8	0	-		34	0
2015	Kashiwa Reysol	J1 League	30	0	3	0	1	0	10	0	44	0
2016	Kyoto Sanga	J2 League	40	0	0	0	–		–		40	0
2017	Kyoto Sanga	J2 League	32	0	0	0	–		–		32	0
2018	Hokkaido Consadole Sapporo	J1 League	0	0	1	0	6	0	–		7	0
2019	Hokkaido Consadole Sapporo	J1 League	1	0	1	0	12	0	–		14	0
2020	Hokkaido Consadole Sapporo	J1 League	28	0	–		1	0	–		29	0
2021	Hokkaido Consadole Sapporo	J1 League	36	0	0	0	5	0	–		41	0
2022	Hokkaido Consadole Sapporo	J1 League	27	0	0	0	1	0	–		28	0
2023	Hokkaido Consadole Sapporo	J1 League	14	0	0	0	1	0	–		15	0
2024	Hokkaido Consadole Sapporo	J1 League	35	0	0	0	2	0	–		37	0
Total			635	1	35	0	61	0	28	0	759	1

== Honours ==
Kashiwa Reysol

- J1 League: 2011
- J2 League: 2010
- Emperor's Cup: 2012
- J.League Cup: 2013
- Japanese Super Cup: 2012

Yokohama

- J2 League: 2006

Individual Honors

- J.League Rookie of the Year: 2007
