= Bae Chun-suk =

South Korean footballer (born 1990)

Bae Chun-Suk 배천석
Personal information
- Full name: Bae Chun-Suk
- Date of birth: April 27, 1990 (age 36)
- Place of birth: Daegu, South Korea
- Height: 1.87 m (6 ft 1 1/2 in)
- Position: Striker

Team information
- Current team: Jeonnam Dragons
- Number: 18

Youth career
- 2006–2008: Pohang Steelers U-18
- 2009–2011: Soongsil University

Senior career*
Years	Team	Apps	(Gls)
2011–2014	Pohang Steelers	24	(4)
2011–2012	→ Vissel Kobe (loan)	3	(0)
2015	Busan IPark	21	(1)
2016–	Jeonnam Dragons	31	(3)
- * Club domestic league appearances and goals as of 2 January 2018

Bae Chun-Suk (born April 27, 1990) is a South Korean football player who plays for Jeonnam Dragons as a striker.

== Club statistics ==
Statistics accurate as of 6 December 2015

Club Performance			League		Cup^{1}		League Cup^{2}		Continental		Total	
Club	Season	League	Apps	Goals	Apps	Goals	Apps	Goals	Apps	Goals	Apps	Goals
Japan			League		Emperor's Cup		J.League Cup		Asia		Total	
Vissel Kobe	2011	J1 League	3	0	1	0	0	0	—		4	0
Vissel Kobe	2012	J1 League	0	0	0	0	1	0	—		1	0
South Korea			League		Korean FA Cup		—		Asia		Total	
Pohang Steelers	2013	KL Classic	20	4	0	0	—		5	1	25	5
Pohang Steelers	2014	KL Classic	4	0	0	0	—		3	1	7	1
Busan I'Park	2015	KL Classic	21	1	0	0	—		0	0	21	1
Country	Japan		3	0	1	0	1	0	0	0	5	0
Country	South Korea		45	5	0	0	—		8	2	53	7
Total			48	5	1	0	1	0	8	2	58	7

^{1}Includes Emperor's Cup. ^{2}Includes J.League Cup.
