= Max Carrasco =

Brazilian footballer (born 1984)

Personal information
- Full name: Max Willian Carrasco
- Date of birth: May 3, 1984 (age 42)
- Place of birth: Belo Horizonte, Brazil
- Height: 1.78 m (5 ft 10 in)
- Position: Midfielder

Team information
- Current team: Anápolis

Senior career*
Years	Team	Apps	(Gls)
2007	Marília		
2007–2008	Grêmio Barueri		
2009	Noroeste		
2009–2012	Betim	94	(1)
2011	→ Vegalta Sendai (loan)	2	(0)
2013	Villa Nova		
2013	Luverdense	12	(0)
2014	Anápolis		
2015	Arapiracara		
- * Club domestic league appearances and goals as of 1 June 2014

Max Willian Carrasco (born May 3, 1984) is a Brazilian football player.

== Career ==
Born in Belo Horizonte, Carrasco has played in the Campeonato Brasileiro Série B with Betim Esporte Clube (formerly known as Ipatinga Futebol Clube) on multiple occasions.

== Club statistics ==
Statistics accurate as of 5 February 2012

Club	Season	League	League		Cup^{1}		League Cup^{2}		Total	
Club	Season	League	Apps	Goals	Apps	Goals	Apps	Goals	Apps	Goals
Ipatinga	2009	Série B	34	0						
Ipatinga	2010	Série B	35	1						
Ipatinga	Total		69	1						
Vegalta Sendai	2011	J1 League	2	0	0	0	0	0	2	0
Vegalta Sendai	Total		2	0	0	0	0	0	2	0
Career total			71	1						

^{1}Includes Emperor's Cup.

^{2}Includes J.League Cup.
