= Masato Fujita =

Japanese footballer (born 1986)

Personal information
- Full name: Masato Fujita
- Date of birth: 8 May 1986 (age 40)
- Place of birth: Ōita, Ōita, Japan
- Height: 1.76 m (5 ft 9 in)
- Position: Right back

Team information
- Current team: Ventforet Kofu
- Number: 2

Youth career
- 2002–2004: Kunimi High School
- 2005–2008: Meiji University

Senior career*
Years	Team	Apps	(Gls)
2009	Tokyo Verdy	46	(0)
2010	Yokohama F. Marinos	5	(0)
2011	Yokohama FC	34	(2)
2012–2015	Kashiwa Reysol	52	(1)
2016–2019	Sagan Tosu	75	(1)
2020–	Ventforet Kofu	4	(0)
Medal record
Kashiwa Reysol
Winner	J.League Cup	2013
Winner	Emperor's Cup	2012
- * Club domestic league appearances and goals as of 11:29, 19 July 2020 (UTC)

Masato Fujita (藤田 優人, Fujita Masato; born 8 May 1986 in Ōita, Ōita) is a Japanese football player who has played for the J2 League team Ventforet Kofu.

== Career statistics ==
Updated to 24 February 2019.

Club performance			League		Cup		League Cup		Continental		Total	
Season	Club	League	Apps	Goals	Apps	Goals	Apps	Goals	Apps	Goals	Apps	Goals
Japan			League		Emperor's Cup		League Cup		AFC		Total	
2009	Tokyo Verdy	J2 League	46	0	1	0	-		-		47	0
2010	Yokohama F. Marinos	J1 League	5	0	0	0	2	0	-		7	0
2011	Yokohama FC	J2 League	34	2	1	0	0	0	-		35	2
2012	Kashiwa Reysol	J1 League	14	0	4	0	3	0	2	0	23	0
2013	Kashiwa Reysol	J1 League	15	0	2	0	5	0	5	0	27	0
2014	Kashiwa Reysol	J1 League	13	1	0	0	3	0	-		16	1
2015	Kashiwa Reysol	J1 League	10	0	1	0	0	0	3	0	14	0
2016	Sagan Tosu	J1 League	32	1	2	0	4	0	-		38	1
2017	Sagan Tosu	J1 League	23	0	2	0	5	0	-		30	0
2018	Sagan Tosu	J1 League	12	0	1	0	6	0	-		19	0
Career total			204	4	14	0	28	0	10	0	256	4
