= Kweon Han-jin =

South Korean footballer

Kweon Han-Jin
Personal information
- Full name: Kweon Han-Jin
- Date of birth: May 19, 1988 (age 38)
- Place of birth: Changwon, South Korea
- Height: 1.87 m (6 ft 1 1/2 in)
- Position: Defender

Team information
- Current team: Incheon United
- Number: 55

Senior career*
Years	Team	Apps	(Gls)
2011–2012	Kashiwa Reysol	4	(1)
2013	Shonan Bellmare	4	(0)
2013–2014	Thespakusatsu Gunma	55	(1)
2015	Roasso Kumamoto	41	(4)
2016–2021	Jeju United	154	(10)
2022	Daejeon Hana Citizen	14	(0)
2023–2024	Incheon United	25	(1)
- * Club domestic league appearances and goals as of 26 June 2024

Kweon Han-Jin (Korean: 권한진; born May 19, 1988) is a South Korean football player who plays for Incheon United.

== Career statistics ==
As of match played 26 June 2024

Appearances and goals by club, season and competition
Club	Season	League			Cup		League Cup		Continental		Other		Total	
Club	Season	Division	Apps	Goals	Apps	Goals	Apps	Goals	Apps	Goals	Apps	Goals	Apps	Goals
Kashiwa Reysol	2011	J1 League	0	0	0	0	0	0	—		0	0	0	0
Kashiwa Reysol	2012	J1 League	4	1	0	0	0	0	0	0	—		4	1
Kashiwa Reysol	Total		4	1	0	0	0	0	0	0	0	0	4	1
Shonan Bellmare	2013	J1 League	4	0	—		5	0	—		—		9	0
Thespakusatsu Gunma	2013	J2 League	16	1	0	0	—		—		0	0	0	0
Thespakusatsu Gunma	2014	J2 League	39	0	3	0	—		—		—		42	0
Thespakusatsu Gunma	Total		55	1	3	0	—		—		—		58	1
Roasso Kumamoto	2015	J2 League	41	4	2	0	—		—		—		43	4
Jeju United	2016	K League 1	37	5	1	0	—		—		0	0	38	5
Jeju United	2017	K League 1	26	0	1	0	—		4	0	—		31	0
Jeju United	2018	K League 1	32	3	1	0	—		3	0	—		36	3
Jeju United	2019	K League 1	8	0	0	0	—		—		—		8	0
Jeju United	2020	K League 2	21	1	0	0	—		—		—		21	1
Jeju United	2021	K League 1	30	1	0	0	—		—		—		30	1
Jeju United	Total		154	10	3	0	—		7	0	—		164	10
Daejeon Hana Citizen	2022	K League 2	14	1	1	0	—		—		—		15	1
Incheon United	2023	K League 1	18	1	1	0	—		3	0	—		22	1
Incheon United	2024	K League 1	7	0	3	0	—		—		—		10	0
Incheon United	Total		25	1	4	0	—		3	0	—		32	1
Total			104	6	5	0	5	0	0	0	0	0	114	6
