= An Yong-hak =

North Korean footballer (born 1978)

An Yong-Hak
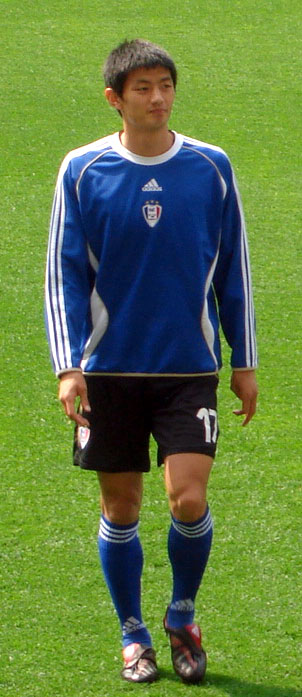
- An Yong-hak with Suwon Bluewings in 2008

Personal information
- Full name: An Yong-Hak
- Date of birth: 25 October 1978 (age 47)
- Place of birth: Kurashiki, Okayama, Japan
- Height: 1.82 m (6 ft 0 in)
- Position: Defensive midfielder

Youth career
- 1998–2001: Rissho University

Senior career*
Years	Team	Apps	(Gls)
2002–2004	Albirex Niigata	94	(7)
2005	Nagoya Grampus Eight	21	(0)
2006–2007	Busan IPark	59	(5)
2008–2009	Suwon Bluewings	18	(2)
2010	Omiya Ardija	17	(0)
2011–2012	Kashiwa Reysol	8	(0)
2014–2017	Yokohama	34	(3)

International career^{‡}
2002–2012	North Korea	40	(3)
2018	United Koreans in Japan	1	(0)

Managerial career
- 2018: United Koreans in Japan
- * Club domestic league appearances and goals as of 23 February 2016 ‡ National team caps and goals as of 31 May 2018

- An Yong-hak
- Hangul: 안영학
- Hanja: 安英學
- RR: An Yeonghak
- MR: An Yŏnghak

An Yong-Hak (Korean: 안영학; born 25 October 1978) is a former professional footballer who played as a midfielder. Born in Japan, he represented North Korea internationally.

== Club statistics ==
Updated to 23 February 2016.

Club performance			League		Cup		League Cup		Continental		Total	
Season	Club	League	Apps	Goals	Apps	Goals	Apps	Goals	Apps	Goals	Apps	Goals
2002	Albirex Niigata	J2 League	39	3	2	2	—		—		41	5
2003	Albirex Niigata	J2 League	29	1	0	0	—		—		29	1
2004	Albirex Niigata	J1 League	26	3	1	0	4	0	—		31	3
2005	Nagoya Grampus Eight	J1 League	21	0	2	0	0	0	—		23	0
2006	Busan IPark	K League 1	17	2	1	0	12	1	—		30	3
2007	Busan IPark	K League 1	22	3	2	0	8	1	—		32	4
2008	Suwon Bluewings	K League 1	4	0	1	0	5	0	—		10	0
2009	Suwon Bluewings	K League 1	14	2	3	0	0	0	—		17	2
2010	Omiya Ardija	J1 League	17	0	1	0	1	0	—		19	0
2011	Kashiwa Reysol	J1 League	2	0	0	0	1	0	—		3	0
2012	Kashiwa Reysol	J1 League	6	0	1	0	1	0	2	0	10	0
2014	Yokohama FC	J2 League	27	2	0	0	—		—		27	2
2015	Yokohama FC	J2 League	7	1	0	0	—		—		0	0
Total			251	17	14	2	32	2	2	0	299	21

== Honours ==
=== Albirex Niigata ===
- J2 League (1): 2003

=== Suwon Bluewings ===
- K League 1 (1): 2008
- Korean FA Cup (1): 2009
- Korean League Cup (1): 2008

=== Kashiwa Reysol ===
- J1 League (1): 2011
- Japanese Super Cup (1): 2012

== International goals ==
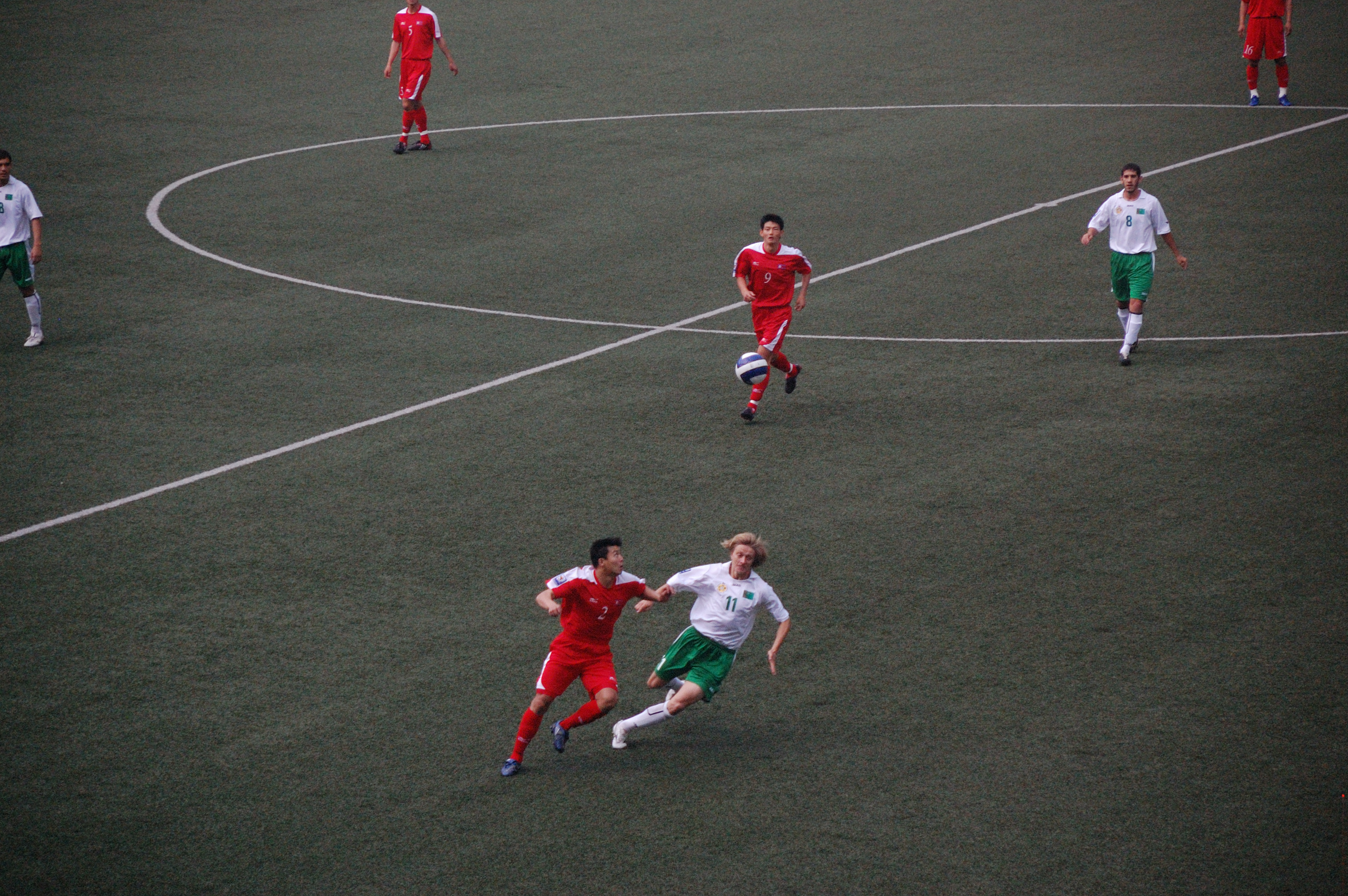
An Yong Hak (№9) against Turkmenistan

.Scores and results are list North Korea's goal tally first.

No.	Date	Venue	Opponent	Score	Result	Competition
1.	8 September 2004	Yanggakdo Stadium, Pyongyang, North Korea	Thailand	1–0	4–1	2006 FIFA World Cup qualification
2.	8 September 2004	Yanggakdo Stadium, Pyongyang, North Korea	Thailand	4–1	4–1	2006 FIFA World Cup qualification
3.	5 December 2012	Hong Kong Stadium, Hong Kong	Australia	1–1	1–1	2013 EAFF East Asian Cup
