= Leandro Domingues =

Brazilian footballer (1983–2025)

- Domingues wearing jersey of Esporte Clube Vitória (c. 2009)

Personal information
- Full name: Leandro Domingues Barbosa
- Date of birth: 24 August 1983
- Place of birth: Vitória da Conquista, Bahia, Brazil
- Date of death: 1 April 2025 (aged 41)
- Place of death: Salvador, Bahia, Brazil
- Height: 1.72 m (5 ft 8 in)
- Position: Attacking midfielder

Youth career
- 2000: Vitória

Senior career*
Years	Team	Apps	(Gls)
2001–2006	Vitória	33	(5)
2007–2008	Cruzeiro	23	(7)
2008	→ Vitória (loan)	15	(3)
2009	→ Fluminense (loan)	0	(0)
2009	→ Vitória (loan)	30	(8)
2010–2014	Kashiwa Reysol	107	(40)
2014–2015	Nagoya Grampus	11	(2)
2016	Vitória	9	(1)
2017	Portuguesa	0	(0)
2017–2021	Yokohama FC	98	(20)
2022	Betim	1	(0)
- * Club domestic league appearances and goals

Leandro Domingues Barbosa (24 August 1983 – 1 April 2025), known as Leandro Domingues, was a Brazilian professional footballer who played as an attacking midfielder.

== Career ==
After four seasons with Kashiwa Reysol, Domingues was transferred to Nagoya Grampus. After playing for one and a half seasons, he was released in November 2015. After a brief return to Brazil, he signed with Yokohama FC in mid-season 2017.

== Death ==
Domingues died from testicular cancer on 1 April 2025, at the age of 41.

== Career statistics ==
Appearances and goals by club, season and competition
Club	Season	League			National cup (Note: Includes Copa do Brasil, Emperor's Cup.)		League cup (Note: Includes J.League Cup.)		Continental		Total	
Club	Season	Division	Apps	Goals	Apps	Goals	Apps	Goals	Apps	Goals	Apps	Goals
Cruzeiro	2007	Série A	23	7							23	7
Vitória	2008	Série A	15	3							15	3
Vitória	2009	Série A	30	8					4	0	34	8
Vitória	Total		45	11					4	0	49	11
Kashiwa Reysol	2010	J2 League	32	13	3	4	–		–		35	17
Kashiwa Reysol	2011	J1 League	30	15	3	3	2	0	3	1	38	19
Kashiwa Reysol	2012	J1 League	28	10	2	2	3	4	7	5	40	21
Kashiwa Reysol	2013	J1 League	12	2	1	0	1	0	6	3	20	5
Kashiwa Reysol	2014	J1 League	5	0	0	0	1	0	0	0	6	0
Kashiwa Reysol	Total		107	40	9	9	7	4	16	9	139	62
Nagoya Grampus	2014	J1 League	11	2	2	1	0	0	0	0	13	3
Nagoya Grampus	2015	J1 League	3	0	0	0	0	0	0	0	3	0
Nagoya Grampus	Total		14	2	2	1	0	0	0	0	16	3
Yokohama FC	2017	J2 League	19	3	0	0	–		–		19	3
Yokohama FC	2018	J2 League	38	11	0	0	–		–		38	11
Yokohama FC	Total		57	14	0	0	0	0	0	0	57	14
Career total			246	74	11	10	7	4	20	9	284	97

== Honours ==
Vitória

- Campeonato Baiano: 2002, 2003, 2004, 2005, 2009, 2016
- Copa do Nordeste: 2003

Cruzeiro

- Campeonato Mineiro: 2008

Kashiwa Reysol

- J.League Division 1: 2011
- J.League Division 2: 2010
- Japanese Super Cup: 2012
- Emperor's Cup: 2012
- J.League Cup: 2013

Individual

- J.League Most Valuable Player: 2011
- J.League Best XI: 2011, 2012
