= Ricardo Lobo =

Brazilian footballer (born 1984)

Personal information
- Full name: Ricardo Lobo
- Date of birth: May 20, 1984 (age 42)
- Place of birth: Campinas, Brazil
- Height: 1.77 m (5 ft 10 in)
- Position: Striker

Team information
- Current team: Cascavel

Senior career*
Years	Team	Apps	(Gls)
2004	Guarani	9	(2)
2005	Ulbra	8	(5)
2005	Criciúma	12	(3)
2005	Atlético Sorocaba	5	(2)
2006	Criciúma	5	(2)
2007	CENE	22	(13)
2007	Criciúma	6	(3)
2008	Águia Negra	13	(6)
2009	Criciúma	12	(4)
2009–2011	Metropolitano	14	(7)
2010–2011	→ Tochigi SC (loan)	31	(16)
2012	Kashiwa Reysol	7	(0)
2012	→ JEF United Chiba (loan)	12	(0)
2013–2014	Doxa Katokopias	15	(8)
2014	Brusque	16	(5)
2014	→ Ehime FC (loan)	13	(3)
2015–2016	Doxa Katokopias	23	(13)
2016	Tochigi SC	5	(1)
2017	Brusque	0	(0)
2017	Joinville	12	(2)
2018	Villa Nova	?	(?)
2018	Novo Hamburgo	?	(?)
2019–	Cascavel	?	(?)
- * Club domestic league appearances and goals as of 14 April 2019

Ricardo Lobo (リカルド・ロボ | born May 20, 1984) is a Brazilian football striker who plays for Cascavel.

On January 14, 2010, Ricardo Lobo transferred to Tochigi S.C. in J. League Division 2. In January 2015, he re-signed for Cypriot club Doxa Katokopias.

== Club statistics ==
As of match played on 22 March 2015.

Club	Season	League			Cup		Other		Total	
Club	Season	Division	Apps	Goals	Apps	Goals	Apps	Goals	Apps	Goals
Veranópolis	2009	Série C	0	0	0	0	1 (Note: Appearance in Campeonato Gaucho)	0	1	0
Criciúma	2009	Série C	3	0	0	0	—		3	0
Tochigi	2010	J2 League	31	16	0	0	—		31	16
Tochigi	2011	J2 League	36	12	0	0	—		36	12
Kashiwa Reysol	2012	J1 League	7	0	1	0	5 (Note: Appearances in AFC Champions League)	0	13	0
JEF United Chiba	2012	J2 League	12	0	0	0	—		13	0
Doxa	2013–14	Cyta Championship	15	8	0	0	—		15	8
Brusque	2014	Série D	0	0	0	0	16 (Note: Appearances in Campeonato Catarinense)	5	16	5
Ehime FC	2014	J2 League	13	3	1	0	—		14	3
Doxa	2014–15	Cyta Championship	10	5	1	0	—		11	5
Career total			127	44	3	0	22	5	152	49
