= 2012 J.League Division 1 =

20th season of J1 League

J.League Division 1
- Season: 2012
- Champions: Sanfrecce Hiroshima; 1st J.League title 6th Japanese title
- Relegated: Vissel Kobe; Gamba Osaka; Consadole Sapporo
- Champions League: Sanfrecce Hiroshima; Vegalta Sendai; Urawa Red Diamonds; Kashiwa Reysol
- Matches: 306
- Goals: 855 (2.79 per match)
- Top goalscorer: Hisato Satō (22 goals)
- Biggest home win: Kashima Antlers 7–0 Consadole Sapporo
- Biggest away win: Gamba Osaka 2–6 Kashiwa Reysol; Shimizu S-Pulse 3–5 Kashiwa Reysol
- Highest scoring: Gamba Osaka 7–2 Consadole Sapporo (9 goals)
- Highest attendance: 51,879; Reds vs Grampus
- Lowest attendance: 5,432; Sagan vs Albirex
- Average attendance: 17,566

The 2012 J.League Division 1 season was the 47th season of Japanese top-flight football and 20th since the establishment of the J.League. The season started on March 10 and finished on December 1.

Sanfrecce Hiroshima won the 2012 J.League Division 1 championship on 24 November and advanced to the 2012 FIFA Club World Cup as the host team, entering the qualifying play-off round. This was their first title in the J.League era and first league title since 1970, marking their sixth title overall. Additionally, this was the first time since 1966 that clubs from the traditional regions of Kantō, Tōkai or Kansai – the corridor from Tokyo to Osaka – did not make the top two, and this time it was a team from Tōhoku, Vegalta Sendai, who finished in second place despite leading the table most of the season.

== Clubs ==
Ventforet Kofu, Avispa Fukuoka and Montedio Yamagata were relegated at the end of the 2011 season after finishing in the bottom three places of the table. Avispa Fukuoka and Ventforet Kofu returned to J2 after only one season in the top flight, while Montedio Yamagata were relegated after three seasons in J1.

The three relegated teams were replaced by 2011 J.League Division 2 champions FC Tokyo, runners-up Sagan Tosu and third-placed team Consadole Sapporo. FC Tokyo made an immediate return to the top division, while Consadole Sapporo ended a three-year absence. In the end, Sagan Tosu reached J1 after thirteen seasons in the second division.

Locations of the 2012 J.League 1 teams

Club name	Home town(s)	Note(s)
Albirex Niigata	Niigata & Seirō, Niigata	
Kashima Antlers	Southwestern cities/towns of Ibaraki	
Omiya Ardija	Omiya, Saitama	
Cerezo Osaka	Osaka	
Consadole Sapporo	Sapporo, Hokkaidō	Promoted from J2 League (3rd place in J2 2011)
Yokohama F. Marinos	Yokohama, Kanagawa & Yokosuka, Kanagawa	
Kawasaki Frontale	Kawasaki, Kanagawa	
Gamba Osaka	Suita, Osaka	2012 ACL participant (3rd place in J1 2011)
Nagoya Grampus	Nagoya, Aichi	2012 ACL participant (Runners-up in J1 2011)
Júbilo Iwata	Iwata, Shizuoka	
Urawa Red Diamonds	Urawa, Saitama	
Kashiwa Reysol	Kashiwa, Chiba	2012 ACL participant 2011 Defending Champions
Shimizu S-Pulse	Shizuoka	
Sagan Tosu	Tosu, Saga	Promoted from J2 League (Runners-up in J2 2011)
Sanfrecce Hiroshima	Hiroshima	
FC Tokyo	Tokyo	Promoted from J2 League (Champions in J2 2011); 2012 ACL participant (2011 Emperor's Cup winners)
Vegalta Sendai	Sendai, Miyagi	
Vissel Kobe	Kobe, Hyōgo	

=== Personnel and kits ===
Club	Head coach	Kit manufacturer	Front shirt sponsor
Albirex Niigata	(Japan) Masaaki Yanagishita	Adidas	Kameda Seika
Cerezo Osaka	(Brazil) Levir Culpi	Mizuno	Yanmar
Consadole Sapporo	(Japan) Nobuhiro Ishizaki	Kappa	Shiroi Koibito
FC Tokyo	(Serbia) Ranko Popović	Adidas	Lifeval
Gamba Osaka	(Japan) Masanobu Matsunami	Umbro	Panasonic
Júbilo Iwata	(Japan) Hitoshi Morishita	Puma	Yamaha
Kashima Antlers	(Brazil) Jorginho	Nike	Lixil
Kashiwa Reysol	(Brazil) Nelsinho Baptista	Yonex	Hitachi
Kawasaki Frontale	(Japan) Yahiro Kazama	Puma	Fujitsu
Nagoya Grampus	(Serbia) Dragan Stojković	Le Coq Sportif	Toyota
Omiya Ardija	(Slovenia) Zdenko Verdenik	Under Armour	NTT Docomo
Sagan Tosu	(South Korea) Yoon Jong-hwan	Umbro	DHC
Sanfrecce Hiroshima	(Japan) Hajime Moriyasu	Nike	EDION
Shimizu S-Pulse	(Iran) Afshin Ghotbi	Puma	Suzuyo
Urawa Red Diamonds	(Serbia) Mihailo Petrović	Nike	Savas
Vegalta Sendai	(Japan) Makoto Teguramori	Asics	Iris Ohyama
Vissel Kobe	(Japan) Ryo Adachi	Asics	Rakuten
Yokohama F. Marinos	(Japan) Yasuhiro Higuchi	Adidas	Nissan

=== Foreign players ===
Club	Player 1	Player 2	Player 3	AFC player	Non-visa foreign	Type-C contract	Former player(s)
Albirex Niigata	(Brazil) Alan Mineiro	(Brazil) Bruno Lopes	(Brazil) Michael	(South Korea) Kim Jin-su	(Brazil) Bruno Suzuki	(South Korea) Kim Sung-ju	
Cerezo Osaka	(Brazil) Fábio Simplício	(Brazil) Heberty	(Brazil) Kempes	(South Korea) Kim Jin-hyeon	(North Korea) Kim Song-gi	(South Korea) Gu Sung-yun	(Brazil) Branquinho (South Korea) Kim Bo-kyung
Consadole Sapporo	(Australia) Jade North	(Brazil) Ramón	(Brazil) Tele	(South Korea) Kim Jae-hwan			(Brazil) Alcides Junior (Brazil) Thiago Quirino
FC Tokyo	(Brazil) Edmílson	(Brazil) Lucas Severino	(Serbia) Nemanja Vučićević	(South Korea) Jang Hyun-soo			
Gamba Osaka	(Brazil) Eduardo Diniz	(Brazil) Leandro	(Brazil) Paulinho		(South Korea) Kim Jung-ya		(Brazil) Rafinha (South Korea) Lee Seung-yeoul
Júbilo Iwata	(Brazil) Rodrigo Souto	(South Korea) Baek Sung-dong	(South Korea) Cho Byung-kuk	(South Korea) Han Sang-woon	(North Korea) Hwang Song-su		
Kashima Antlers	(Brazil) Juninho	(Brazil) Junior Dutra	(Brazil) Renato Cajá				(Brazil) Alex
Kashiwa Reysol	(Brazil) Jorge Wagner	(Brazil) Leandro Domingues	(Brazil) Neto Baiano	(South Korea) Kweon Han-jin	(North Korea) An Yong-hak		(Brazil) Ricardo Lobo
Kawasaki Frontale	(Brazil) Jeci	(Brazil) Renatinho				(Brazil) Renê Santos	
Nagoya Grampus	(Brazil) Daniel Tijolo	(Colombia) Danilson Córdoba		(Australia) Joshua Kennedy			
Omiya Ardija	(Brazil) Carlinhos Paraíba	(Slovenia) Milivoje Novaković	(Slovenia) Zlatan Ljubijankić	(South Korea) Cho Young-cheol		(South Korea) Lee Keun-ho	(Brazil) Rafael Marques (South Korea) Kim Young-gwon
Sagan Tosu	(Brazil) Tozin	(South Korea) Kim Kun-hoan	(South Korea) Kim Min-woo	(South Korea) Yeo Sung-hae			
Sanfrecce Hiroshima	(Croatia) Mihael Mikić			(South Korea) Hwang Seok-ho		(South Korea) Lee Dae-heon	
Shimizu S-Pulse	(Netherlands) Calvin Jong-a-Pin	(South Korea) Kim Hyun-sung		(South Korea) Lee Ki-je	(North Korea) Kang Song-ho		(Australia) Alex Brosque (Brazil) Jymmy
Urawa Red Diamonds	(Brazil) Márcio Richardes	(Brazil) Popó	(Serbia) Ranko Despotović				(Australia) Matthew Spiranovic
Vegalta Sendai	(Brazil) Deyvid Sacconi	(Brazil) Wilson		(South Korea) Park Ju-sung	(North Korea) Ryang Yong-gi		
Vissel Kobe	(Brazil) Anderson Carvalho	(South Korea) Bae Chun-suk		(South Korea) Lee Kwang-seon	(South Korea) Park Kang-jo	(Brazil) Fernando Andrade	
Yokohama F. Marinos	(Brazil) Dutra	(Brazil) Marquinhos					

== League table ==
Pos	Team	Pld	W	D	L	GF	GA	GD	Pts	Qualification or relegation
1	Sanfrecce Hiroshima (C)	34	19	7	8	63	34	+29	64	Qualification to 2012 Club World Cup and 2013 Champions League
2	Vegalta Sendai	34	15	12	7	59	43	+16	57	Qualification to 2013 Champions League (Note: The winners of the 2012 Emperor's Cup qualified for the group stage of the 2013 AFC Champions League.)
3	Urawa Red Diamonds	34	15	10	9	47	42	+5	55	Qualification to 2013 Champions League
4	Yokohama F. Marinos	34	13	14	7	44	33	+11	53	
5	Sagan Tosu	34	15	8	11	48	39	+9	53	
6	Kashiwa Reysol	34	15	7	12	57	52	+5	52	Qualification to 2013 Champions League
7	Nagoya Grampus	34	15	7	12	46	47	−1	52	
8	Kawasaki Frontale	34	14	8	12	51	50	+1	50	
9	Shimizu S-Pulse	34	14	7	13	39	40	−1	49	
10	FC Tokyo	34	14	6	14	47	44	+3	48	
11	Kashima Antlers	34	12	10	12	50	43	+7	46	
12	Júbilo Iwata	34	13	7	14	57	53	+4	46	
13	Omiya Ardija	34	11	11	12	38	45	−7	44	
14	Cerezo Osaka	34	11	9	14	47	53	−6	42	
15	Albirex Niigata	34	10	10	14	29	34	−5	40	
16	Vissel Kobe (R)	34	11	6	17	41	50	−9	39	Relegation to 2013 J.League Division 2
17	Gamba Osaka (R)	34	9	11	14	67	65	+2	38	Relegation to 2013 J.League Division 2
18	Consadole Sapporo (R)	34	4	2	28	25	88	−63	14	Relegation to 2013 J.League Division 2

Updated to match(es) played on 1 December 2012. Source: J.League Division 1
Rules for classification: 1) points; 2) goal difference; 3) number of goals scored.
(C) Champions; (R) Relegated

== Results ==
Home \ Away	ALB	ANT	ARD	CER	CON	FMA	FRO	GAM	GRA	JÚB	RED	REY	SAG	SFR	SSP	TOK	VEG	VIS
Albirex Niigata		1–1	1–2	0–1	4–1	0–0	0–1	1–1	5–0	1–6	0–0	1–1	0–2	0–2	1–0	0–2	0–1	0–0
Kashima Antlers	0–1		1–0	3–2	7–0	1–2	0–1	5–0	2–3	2–1	1–3	2–0	0–0	2–2	1–2	5–1	3–3	1–0
Omiya Ardija	1–1	0–0		0–3	2–1	0–0	0–2	1–0	1–1	2–0	2–0	2–4	1–0	1–2	1–0	0–1	1–3	2–2
Cerezo Osaka	0–1	0–1	1–3		4–0	2–0	2–2	2–1	0–2	3–2	1–1	1–2	3–2	1–4	3–2	1–1	1–2	1–2
Consadole Sapporo	0–1	0–0	0–5	1–0		0–2	2–3	0–4	2–1	0–0	1–2	0–2	2–3	1–3	0–2	0–1	2–1	2–4
Yokohama F. Marinos	3–2	0–0	1–1	1–1	2–1		2–2	0–0	1–1	4–0	1–2	1–2	1–0	0–0	3–0	1–0	0–2	3–1
Kawasaki Frontale	1–0	2–2	4–1	0–1	1–0	0–0		2–3	0–1	4–3	4–2	0–2	1–2	1–4	2–1	0–1	3–2	0–1
Gamba Osaka	1–1	2–2	3–1	2–2	7–2	1–2	3–2		2–2	1–2	1–2	2–6	2–3	1–1	3–1	2–2	1–1	2–3
Nagoya Grampus	2–1	1–2	0–0	0–1	3–1	1–1	2–3	0–5		2–0	1–2	1–0	1–0	1–2	1–0	1–0	0–0	5–1
Júbilo Iwata	0–0	3–0	4–0	4–3	4–1	1–0	2–2	2–1	0–2		2–2	1–0	2–1	1–1	0–1	3–1	1–1	1–3
Urawa Red Diamonds	1–1	2–1	1–1	0–0	1–2	1–2	1–1	0–5	2–0	2–0		1–0	4–3	2–0	1–0	2–2	0–0	2–0
Kashiwa Reysol	2–0	1–1	1–4	4–1	3–1	3–3	1–0	2–2	1–2	0–3	1–2		1–1	2–5	2–1	1–1	2–3	1–0
Sagan Tosu	1–0	2–0	1–1	0–0	1–0	1–0	0–1	4–1	1–3	3–2	3–1	3–1		1–0	0–1	1–0	1–1	3–0
Sanfrecce Hiroshima	0–1	2–0	0–0	4–1	3–0	1–3	3–0	4–1	1–1	2–0	1–0	1–2	4–1		1–2	0–1	2–1	3–2
Shimizu S-Pulse	0–1	3–0	0–0	1–1	1–0	0–0	0–0	1–3	3–2	3–2	0–2	3–5	1–1	2–1		1–1	3–1	1–1
FC Tokyo	0–2	1–2	0–1	2–0	5–0	3–1	1–2	3–2	3–2	2–1	1–1	0–1	3–2	0–1	0–1		6–2	0–1
Vegalta Sendai	0–1	1–0	4–1	1–1	4–1	2–2	2–1	2–1	4–0	2–2	3–2	0–0	1–1	2–2	0–1	4–0		2–1
Vissel Kobe	1–0	1–2	3–0	2–3	2–1	1–2	3–3	1–1	0–1	1–2	1–0	3–1	0–0	0–1	0–1	0–2	0–1	

Updated to match(es) played on 1 December 2012. Source: J. League Division 1
Legend: Blue = home team win; Yellow = draw; Red = away team win.

== Season statistics ==
=== Top scorers ===
Rank	Scorer	Club	Goals
1	(Japan) Hisato Satō	Sanfrecce Hiroshima	22
2	(Japan) Yohei Toyoda	Sagan Tosu	19
3	(Brazil) Leandro	Gamba Osaka	14
3	(Japan) Shingo Akamine	Vegalta Sendai	14
5	(Brazil) Wilson	Vegalta Sendai	13
5	(Japan) Genki Omae	Shimizu S-Pulse	13
5	(Japan) Masato Kudo	Kashiwa Reysol	13
5	(Japan) Ryoichi Maeda	Júbilo Iwata	13
9	(Japan) Akihiro Sato	Gamba Osaka	11
9	(Japan) Shinzo Koroki	Kashima Antlers	11
9	(Japan) Yoichiro Kakitani	Cerezo Osaka	11
12	(Brazil) Leandro Domingues	Kashiwa Reysol	10
12	(Brazil) Lucas Severino	FC Tokyo	10
12	(Brazil) Marquinhos	Yokohama F. Marinos	10
12	(Brazil) Renatinho	Kawasaki Frontale	10
12	(Japan) Kensuke Nagai	Nagoya Grampus	10
17	(Brazil) Márcio Richardes	Urawa Red Diamonds	9
17	(Japan) Hiroki Yamada	Júbilo Iwata	9
17	(Japan) Keijiro Ogawa	Vissel Kobe	9
17	(Japan) Marcus Tulio Tanaka	Nagoya Grampus	9
17	(Japan) Toshiyuki Takagi	Shimizu S-Pulse	9
17	(Japan) Yuya Osako	Kashima Antlers	9

Source: J. League Division 1

== Attendances ==
Pos	Team	Total	High	Low	Average	Change
1	Urawa Red Diamonds	622,772	51,879	25,743	36,634	+8.0%
2	Albirex Niigata	425,309	35,506	15,854	25,018	−4.0%
3	FC Tokyo	407,243	34,822	16,229	23,955	+36.4%^{†}
4	Yokohama F. Marinos	390,078	36,412	7,101	22,946	+9.1%
5	Kawasaki Frontale	302,719	20,996	12,509	17,807	+2.7%
6	Sanfrecce Hiroshima	301,249	32,724	11,123	17,721	+34.2%
7	Nagoya Grampus	291,632	30,354	7,959	17,155	+2.5%
8	Cerezo Osaka	287,524	36,723	8,226	16,913	+19.6%
9	Vegalta Sendai	282,200	18,722	11,831	16,600	+6.0%
10	Kashima Antlers	261,484	23,507	10,626	15,381	−4.8%
11	Shimizu S-Pulse	257,054	23,188	8,710	15,121	−4.3%
12	Gamba Osaka	251,232	19,393	8,218	14,778	−10.0%
13	Vissel Kobe	248,853	22,766	8,755	14,638	+10.6%
14	Kashiwa Reysol	234,064	26,106	10,351	13,768	+15.5%
15	Júbilo Iwata	223,071	28,745	8,978	13,122	+11.2%
16	Consadole Sapporo	204,141	25,353	6,870	12,008	+14.6%^{†}
17	Sagan Tosu	203,844	22,116	5,432	11,991	+55.1%^{†}
18	Omiya Ardija	180,831	12,709	7,936	10,637	+16.9%
	League total	5,375,300	51,879	5,432	17,566	+11.2%

Updated to games played on 1 December 2012
Source: J. League Division 1
Notes:
^{†} Team played previous season in J2.

== Awards ==
=== Individual awards ===
Award	Recipient	Club
Most Valuable Player	(Japan) Hisato Satō	Sanfrecce Hiroshima
Rookie of the Year	(Japan) Gaku Shibasaki	Kashima Antlers
Manager of the Year	(Japan) Hajime Moriyasu	Sanfrecce Hiroshima
Top Scorer	(Japan) Hisato Satō	Sanfrecce Hiroshima

=== Best Eleven ===
Pos	Footballer	Club	Nationality
GK	Shusaku Nishikawa	Sanfrecce Hiroshima	Japan
DF	Hiroki Mizumoto	Sanfrecce Hiroshima	Japan
DF	Marcus Tulio Tanaka	Nagoya Grampus	Japan
DF	Yūichi Komano	Júbilo Iwata	Japan
MF	Leandro Domingues	Kashiwa Reysol	Brazil
MF	Toshihiro Aoyama	Sanfrecce Hiroshima	Japan
MF	Yasuhito Endō	Gamba Osaka	Japan
MF	Yojiro Takahagi	Sanfrecce Hiroshima	Japan
FW	Wilson	Vegalta Sendai	Brazil
FW	Hisato Satō	Sanfrecce Hiroshima	Japan
FW	Yohei Toyoda	Sagan Tosu	Japan
