= 2011 J.League Division 1 =

19th season of J1 League

J.League Division 1
- Season: 2011
- Champions: Kashiwa Reysol; 1st J.League title 2nd Japanese title
- Relegated: Ventforet Kofu; Avispa Fukuoka; Montedio Yamagata
- Champions League: Kashiwa Reysol; Nagoya Grampus; Gamba Osaka; FC Tokyo
- Matches: 306
- Goals: 869 (2.84 per match)
- Top goalscorer: Joshua Kennedy (19 goals)
- Highest attendance: 54,441; Reds vs Reysol
- Lowest attendance: 4,028; Avispa vs Ardija
- Average attendance: 15,797

The 2011 J.League Division 1 season was the 46th season of professional football in Japan, and the 19th since the establishment of the J.League. The season began on March 5 and concluded on December 3. The season was put on hold from March 12 to April 23 due to the aftermath of the 2011 Tōhoku earthquake and tsunami, therefore canceling a planned five-week summer break between June 27–July 29 in order to allow preparation of the Japan national team for the 2011 Copa América.

The 2011 J.League Division 1 champion also qualified to the 2011 FIFA Club World Cup as the host team, entering the qualifying play-off round.

Kashiwa Reysol won a second league title, their first in 39 years and first in the professional J.League era. They also became the first champions to win the title the season after being promoted as second division champions.

== Clubs ==
FC Tokyo, Kyoto Sanga and Shonan Bellmare were relegated at the end of the 2010 season after finishing in the bottom three places of the table. Shonan had only played one season in Division 1 while Kyoto had enjoyed a three-year stay. FC Tokyo had been in the top flight for eleven seasons.

The three relegated teams were replaced by 2010 J.League Division 2 champions Kashiwa Reysol, runners-up Ventforet Kofu and third-placed team Avispa Fukuoka. Kashiwa had made an immediate return to the top division, while Kofu and Fukuoka ended three- and four-year absences respectively.

Locations of the 2011 J.League 1 teams

Club name	Home town(s)	Notes
Albirex Niigata	Niigata & Seirō, Niigata	
Avispa Fukuoka	Fukuoka	Promoted from J2 League in 2010
Cerezo Osaka	Osaka	2011 ACL participant
Gamba Osaka	Suita, Osaka	2011 ACL participant
Júbilo Iwata	Iwata, Shizuoka	
Kashima Antlers	Southwestern cities/towns of Ibaraki	2011 ACL participant
Kashiwa Reysol	Kashiwa, Chiba	Promoted from J2 League in 2010
Kawasaki Frontale	Kawasaki, Kanagawa	
Montedio Yamagata	All cities/towns in Yamagata	
Nagoya Grampus	Nagoya, Aichi	2011 ACL participant 2010 Defending champions
Omiya Ardija	Omiya, Saitama	
Sanfrecce Hiroshima	Hiroshima	
Shimizu S-Pulse	Shizuoka	
Urawa Red Diamonds	Urawa, Saitama	
Vegalta Sendai	Sendai, Miyagi	
Ventforet Kofu	All cities/towns in Yamanashi	Promoted from J2 League in 2010
Vissel Kobe	Kobe, Hyōgo	
Yokohama F. Marinos	Yokohama & Yokosuka	

=== Personnel and kits ===
Club	Head coach^{1}	Captain^{1}	Kit manufacturer^{1}	Shirt sponsor^{1}
Albirex Niigata	(Japan) Hisashi Kurosaki	(Japan) Isao Homma	Adidas	Kameda Seika
Avispa Fukuoka	(Japan) Tetsuya Asano	(Japan) Kosuke Nakamachi	svolme	EVERLIFE
Cerezo Osaka	(Brazil) Levir Culpi	(Japan) Teruyuki Moniwa	Mizuno	Yanmar
Gamba Osaka	(Japan) Akira Nishino	(Japan) Tomokazu Myojin	Umbro	Panasonic
Júbilo Iwata	(Japan) Masaaki Yanagishita	(Japan) Daisuke Nasu	Puma	Yamaha
Kashima Antlers	(Brazil) Oswaldo de Oliveira	(Japan) Mitsuo Ogasawara	Nike	LIXIL
Kashiwa Reysol	(Brazil) Nelsinho Baptista	(Japan) Hidekazu Otani	Yonex	Hitachi
Kawasaki Frontale	(Japan) Naoki Soma	(Japan) Yusuke Igawa	Puma	Fujitsu
Montedio Yamagata	(Japan) Shinji Kobayashi	(Japan) Katsuyuki Miyazawa	Puma	Tsuyahime
Nagoya Grampus	(Serbia) Dragan Stojković	(Japan) Seigo Narazaki	Le Coq Sportif	Toyota
Omiya Ardija	(Japan) Jun Suzuki	(Japan) Chikara Fujimoto	Under Armour	NTT Docomo
Sanfrecce Hiroshima	(Serbia) Mihailo Petrović	(Japan) Hisato Satō	Nike	Deodeo
Shimizu S-Pulse	(Iran) Afshin Ghotbi	(Japan) Shinji Ono	Puma	Suzuyo
Urawa Red Diamonds	(Japan) Takafumi Hori	(Japan) Keita Suzuki	Nike	Savas
Vegalta Sendai	(Japan) Makoto Teguramori	(Japan) Atsushi Yanagisawa	Asics	IRIS OHYAMA
Ventforet Kofu	(Japan) Satoru Sakuma	(Japan) Hideomi Yamamoto	Mizuno	Hakubaku
Vissel Kobe	(Japan) Masahiro Wada	(Japan) Takayuki Yoshida	Asics	Rakuten
Yokohama F. Marinos	(Japan) Kazushi Kimura	(Japan) Shunsuke Nakamura	Nike	Nissan

^{1} Subject to change during the season.

=== Foreign players ===
club	Player 1	Player 2	Player 3	AFC player	Non-visa foreign	Type-C contract	Former player(s)
Albirex Niigata	(Brazil) Anderson Gonzaga	(Brazil) Bruno Lopes	(Brazil) Michael	(South Korea) Cho Young-cheol			
Avispa Fukuoka	(Brazil) Rafael Ramazotti					(South Korea) Kim Min-je	
Cerezo Osaka	(Brazil) Fábio Lopes	(Brazil) Martinez		(South Korea) Kim Jin-hyeon		(South Korea) Kim Bo-kyung	(Brazil) Rodrigo Pimpão
Gamba Osaka	(Brazil) Rafinha	(South Korea) Kim Seung-yong		(South Korea) Lee Keun-ho	(South Korea) Kim Jung-ya	(Brazil) Afonso	(Brazil) Adriano
Júbilo Iwata	(Brazil) Gilsinho	(Brazil) Rodrigo Souto					(South Korea) Lee Woo-jin (South Korea) Park Joo-ho
Kashima Antlers	(Brazil) Alex	(Brazil) Fellype Gabriel	(Brazil) Tartá			(Brazil) Igor Sartori	(Brazil) Carlão
Kashiwa Reysol	(Brazil) Jorge Wagner	(Brazil) Leandro Domingues		(South Korea) Park Dong-hyuk	(North Korea) An Yong-hak	(South Korea) Kweon Han-jin	(Brazil) Roger
Kawasaki Frontale	(Brazil) Juninho						
Montedio Yamagata	(Brazil) Maicon Souza						(Brazil) Hugo Alcântara
Nagoya Grampus	(Colombia) Danilson Córdoba	(Montenegro) Igor Burzanović		(Australia) Joshua Kennedy			
Omiya Ardija	(Brazil) Rafael Marques	(Brazil) Rodrigo Pimpão	(South Korea) Kim Young-gwon	(South Korea) Lee Chun-soo			
Sanfrecce Hiroshima	(Croatia) Ante Tomić	(Croatia) Mihael Mikić	(Georgia (country)) Davit Mujiri				
Shimizu S-Pulse	(Australia) Alex Brosque	(Netherlands) Calvin Jong-a-Pin	(Sweden) Freddie Ljungberg	(Australia) Eddy Bosnar			
Urawa Red Diamonds	(Brazil) Márcio Richardes	(Brazil) Mazola	(Serbia) Ranko Despotović	(Australia) Matthew Spiranovic			
Vegalta Sendai	(Brazil) Diego Souza	(Brazil) Max Carrasco	(South Korea) Cho Byung-kuk	(South Korea) Park Ju-sung	(North Korea) Ryang Yong-gi		(Brazil) Marquinhos
Ventforet Kofu	(Brazil) Daniel Tijolo	(Brazil) Davi	(Brazil) Paulinho	(South Korea) Kim Jin-kyu			(Brazil) Rudnei
Vissel Kobe	(Brazil) Popó	(Brazil) Raphael Botti	(Brazil) Rogerinho	(South Korea) Bae Chun-suk	(South Korea) Park Kang-jo		(South Korea) Lee Jae-min
Yokohama F. Marinos				(South Korea) Kim Kun-hoan			(Argentina) Pablo Bastianini

== League table ==
Pos	Team	Pld	W	D	L	GF	GA	GD	Pts	Qualification or relegation
1	Kashiwa Reysol (C)	34	23	3	8	65	42	+23	72	Qualification to 2011 Club World Cup and 2012 Champions League
2	Nagoya Grampus	34	21	8	5	67	36	+31	71	Qualification to 2012 Champions League
3	Gamba Osaka	34	21	7	6	78	51	+27	70	Qualification to 2012 Champions League
4	Vegalta Sendai	34	14	14	6	39	25	+14	56	
5	Yokohama F. Marinos	34	16	8	10	46	40	+6	56	
6	Kashima Antlers	34	13	11	10	53	40	+13	50	
7	Sanfrecce Hiroshima	34	14	8	12	52	49	+3	50	
8	Júbilo Iwata	34	13	8	13	53	45	+8	47	
9	Vissel Kobe	34	13	7	14	44	45	−1	46	
10	Shimizu S-Pulse	34	11	12	11	42	51	−9	45	
11	Kawasaki Frontale	34	13	5	16	52	53	−1	44	
12	Cerezo Osaka	34	11	10	13	67	53	+14	43	
13	Omiya Ardija	34	10	12	12	38	48	−10	42	
14	Albirex Niigata	34	10	9	15	38	46	−8	39	
15	Urawa Red Diamonds	34	8	12	14	36	43	−7	36	
16	Ventforet Kofu (R)	34	9	6	19	42	63	−21	33	Relegation to 2012 J.League Division 2
17	Avispa Fukuoka (R)	34	6	4	24	34	75	−41	22	Relegation to 2012 J.League Division 2
18	Montedio Yamagata (R)	34	5	6	23	23	64	−41	21	Relegation to 2012 J.League Division 2

Updated to match(es) played on December 3, 2011. Source: J. League Division 1
Rules for classification: 1st points; 2nd goal differential; 3rd goals scored; 4th head-to-head results; 5th disciplinary points; 6th draw. The winners of the 2011 Emperor's Cup, FC Tokyo, which played in the 2011 J.League Division 2, also qualified for the group stage of the 2012 AFC Champions League. If two clubs are tied for first place, both clubs will be declared champions.
(C) Champions; (R) Relegated

== Results ==
Home \ Away	ALB	ANT	ARD	AVI	CER	FRO	GAM	GRA	JÚB	MON	REY	SFR	SSP	RED	VEG	VEN	VIS	FMA
Albirex Niigata		2–2	0–0	3–1	1–1	1–0	2–2	0–1	1–1	2–0	0–3	0–1	4–0	2–3	1–1	1–2	1–0	4–2
Kashima Antlers	1–2		3–3	6–0	2–1	2–2	1–4	1–1	2–0	3–1	0–1	2–0	3–0	0–0	3–0	0–1	1–1	0–3
Omiya Ardija	0–0	1–1		0–2	0–0	0–5	2–3	2–3	2–0	1–1	0–1	0–1	1–4	2–2	2–2	3–1	1–1	1–1
Avispa Fukuoka	0–3	1–2	1–0		0–3	2–1	2–3	0–3	1–2	0–2	0–2	2–1	2–2	1–2	0–3	1–0	2–2	0–1
Cerezo Osaka	1–1	1–3	0–1	7–1		3–3	1–1	2–3	2–3	6–0	5–0	5–4	4–0	3–1	1–1	0–4	0–3	0–1
Kawasaki Frontale	1–2	3–2	0–1	3–2	1–2		2–1	1–2	1–0	2–0	3–2	2–0	1–1	0–1	1–2	2–2	0–3	3–0
Gamba Osaka	2–1	1–0	2–0	2–0	2–1	6–3		2–2	2–2	3–2	2–0	5–3	2–2	1–0	1–0	0–2	3–2	2–1
Nagoya Grampus	4–0	2–1	2–2	5–2	3–1	2–0	4–1		2–1	3–0	0–0	3–2	1–1	1–1	0–1	4–1	3–1	1–1
Júbilo Iwata	1–0	1–2	1–2	4–1	0–4	2–1	1–2	0–1		4–0	6–1	1–1	2–1	1–1	1–1	2–1	3–0	1–2
Montedio Yamagata	0–1	0–2	0–1	0–5	0–0	0–1	0–5	0–2	1–1		2–1	1–3	1–1	0–0	0–1	3–1	2–0	0–2
Kashiwa Reysol	4–0	2–1	1–3	3–2	1–1	3–2	2–4	2–1	0–3	1–0		3–1	3–0	3–1	1–0	2–1	3–0	2–0
Sanfrecce Hiroshima	1–0	2–1	4–2	0–0	1–3	2–3	4–1	0–3	3–1	3–2	1–3		4–0	0–0	0–0	1–1	1–0	3–2
Shimizu S-Pulse	2–1	0–0	3–0	1–0	3–3	2–3	1–3	2–0	0–0	2–1	1–2	0–1		1–0	1–0	3–0	1–5	0–0
Urawa Red Diamonds	1–1	2–2	0–1	3–0	1–1	2–0	1–1	3–0	0–3	0–1	1–3	1–1	1–3		0–0	2–0	2–3	0–2
Vegalta Sendai	2–0	0–1	0–1	1–0	2–1	0–0	2–1	1–1	3–3	2–1	0–0	0–0	0–0	1–0		4–0	2–0	1–1
Ventforet Kofu	3–0	1–1	1–1	2–1	0–2	0–1	4–3	3–1	0–1	1–1	1–4	0–2	1–2	3–2	1–2		1–1	1–2
Vissel Kobe	2–1	0–1	0–1	0–0	4–1	1–0	0–4	0–1	3–1	2–0	0–4	1–0	1–1	1–0	1–1	4–2		2–0
Yokohama F. Marinos	1–0	1–1	1–0	3–2	2–1	2–1	1–1	1–2	1–0	2–1	0–2	1–1	1–1	1–2	1–3	4–0	1–0	

Updated to match(es) played on December 3, 2011. Source: J. League Division 1
Legend: Blue = home team win; Yellow = draw; Red = away team win.

== Top scorers ==
Rank	Scorer	Club	Goals
1	(Australia) Joshua Kennedy	Nagoya Grampus	19
2	(Japan) Mike Havenaar	Ventforet Kofu	17
3	(Brazil) Leandro Domingues	Kashiwa Reysol	15
3	(Japan) Tadanari Lee	Sanfrecce Hiroshima	15
3	(South Korea) Lee Keun-ho	Gamba Osaka	15
6	(Japan) Keiji Tamada	Nagoya Grampus	14
6	(Japan) Ryoichi Maeda	Júbilo Iwata	14
6	(Japan) Shingo Akamine	Vegalta Sendai	14
9	(Brazil) Bruno Lopes	Albirex Niigata	13
9	(Japan) Junya Tanaka	Kashiwa Reysol	13
11	(Japan) Hidetaka Kanazono	Júbilo Iwata	12
11	(Japan) Yu Kobayashi	Kawasaki Frontale	12
11	(Japan) Yūzō Tashiro	Kashima Antlers	12
14	(Brazil) Rafinha	Gamba Osaka	11
15	(Brazil) Jorge Wagner	Kashiwa Reysol	10
15	(Brazil) Paulinho	Ventforet Kofu	10
15	(Brazil) Rafael Marques	Omiya Ardija	10
15	(Japan) Hisato Satō	Sanfrecce Hiroshima	10
15	(Japan) Ryūji Bando	Cerezo Osaka	10
20	(Brazil) Adriano	Gamba Osaka	9
20	(Japan) Genki Haraguchi	Urawa Red Diamonds	9
20	(Japan) Hideaki Kitajima	Kashiwa Reysol	9
20	(Japan) Jungo Fujimoto	Nagoya Grampus	9
20	(Japan) Masashi Oguro	Yokohama F. Marinos	9
20	(Japan) Takayuki Yoshida	Vissel Kobe	9
20	(Japan) Yoshito Ōkubo	Vissel Kobe	9
27	(Brazil) Juninho	Kawasaki Frontale	8
27	(Japan) Genki Omae	Shimizu S-Pulse	8
27	(Japan) Hideya Okamoto	Avispa Fukuoka	8
27	(Japan) Shu Kurata	Cerezo Osaka	8

== Awards ==
=== MVP ===
- (Brazil) Leandro Domingues

=== Top scorer ===
- (Australia) Joshua Kennedy

=== Best XI ===
Position	Player
GK	(Japan) Seigo Narazaki
DF	(Japan) Hiroki Sakai
DF	(Japan) Marcus Tulio Tanaka
DF	(Japan) Naoya Kondo
MF	(Brazil) Jorge Wagner
MF	(Brazil) Leandro Domingues
MF	(Japan) Hiroshi Kiyotake
MF	(Japan) Jungo Fujimoto
MF	(Japan) Yasuhito Endō
FW	(Australia) Joshua Kennedy
FW	(Japan) Mike Havenaar

== Attendance ==
Pos	Team	Total	High	Low	Average	Change
1	Urawa Red Diamonds	576,477	54,441	20,240	33,910	−15.1%
2	Albirex Niigata	442,836	37,830	13,644	26,049	−14.7%
3	Yokohama F. Marinos	357,647	37,725	7,104	21,038	−18.1%
4	Kawasaki Frontale	294,776	20,973	13,111	17,340	−6.6%
5	Nagoya Grampus	284,590	28,515	6,793	16,741	−16.2%
6	Gamba Osaka	278,981	20,991	11,364	16,411	−1.5%
7	Kashima Antlers	274,655 ^{1}	25,061	7,810	16,156	−22.9%
8	Shimizu S-Pulse	268,614	21,524	10,745	15,801	−12.2%
9	Vegalta Sendai	266,144	19,224	11,356	15,656	−9.7%
10	Cerezo Osaka	240,465	37,172	5,351	14,145	−5.9%
11	Vissel Kobe	224,962	19,913	6,151	13,233	+3.2%
12	Sanfrecce Hiroshima	224,447	18,788	7,099	13,203	−9.3%
13	Ventforet Kofu	205,808	21,589	6,893	12,106	−2.4%^{†}
14	Kashiwa Reysol	202,593	30,807	6,855	11,917	+47.2%^{†}
15	Júbilo Iwata	200,525	30,516	6,386	11,796	−2.8%
16	Avispa Fukuoka	177,054	19,421	4,028	10,415	+18.1%^{†}
17	Montedio Yamagata	158,527	18,008	5,053	9,325	−20.4%
18	Omiya Ardija	154,681	12,221	5,627	9,099	−17.8%
	League total	4,833,782	54,441	4,028	15,797	−14.3%

Updated to games played on December 3, 2011
Source: J. League Division 1
Notes:
^{†} Team played previous season in J2.

Notes

- Note 1: Kashima Antlers played one game at the Japan National Stadium in Tokyo as the Kashima Soccer Stadium in Kashima was damaged in the 2011 Tōhoku earthquake and tsunami.

== In popular culture ==
This particular season was used as reference in the movie Detective Conan: The Eleventh Striker. Many players in real life actually provide cameo roles for the film, including Kazuyoshi Miura (Yokohama FC), Yasuhito Endō (Gamba Osaka), Yasuyuki Konno (Gamba Osaka), Kengo Nakamura (Kawasaki Frontale), and Seigo Narazaki (Nagoya Grampus). In the movie, a bomber threatens to bomb all the stadiums unless certain conditions are met. The main character, Conan Edogawa, must solve the case and find the culprit. In the movie, two additional fictional teams are added to the squad: Tokyo Spirits and Big Osaka, making the league with 20 teams.
