= 2010 J.League Division 2 =

J.League Division 2
- Season: 2010
- Champions: Kashiwa Reysol; 1st J2 title 2nd D2 title
- Promoted: Kashiwa Reysol; Ventforet Kofu; Avispa Fukuoka
- Matches: 342
- Goals: 835 (2.44 per match)
- Top goalscorer: Mike Havenaar (20 goals total)
- Highest attendance: 26,875 (Round 19, Consadole vs. Yokohama)
- Lowest attendance: 1,456 (Round 27, HollyHock vs. Fagiano)
- Average attendance: 6,696

The 2010 J. League Division 2 season was the 39th season of the second-tier club football in Japan and the 12th season since the establishment of J2 League. The season began on March 6 and ended on December 4.

In this season, the number of participating clubs was increased by one, making the total number, nineteen. As opposed to the last two seasons, clubs will play double-round robin, instead of triple-round robin. At the end of the season, the top three clubs were promoted to J. League Division 1 for the 2011 season. Furthermore, there was no relegation to the third-tier Japan Football League.

== Clubs ==
Locations of the 2010 J.League 2 teams

The following nineteen clubs will play in J. League Division 2 during the 2010 season. Of these clubs, JEF United Chiba, Kashiwa Reysol, and Oita Trinita were relegated from J1 League last year. Also, Giravanz Kitakyushu (formerly known as New Wave Kitakyushu) newly joined from Japan Football League.

| Club name | Home town(s) | Note(s) |
|---|---|---|
| Avispa Fukuoka | Fukuoka, Fukuoka | |
| Consadole Sapporo | Sapporo, Hokkaidō | |
| Ehime FC | All cities/towns in Ehime | |
| Fagiano Okayama | All cities/towns in Okayama | |
| FC Gifu | All cities/towns in Gifu | |
| Giravanz Kitakyushu | Kitakyushu, Fukuoka | Promoted from JFL in 2009; Renamed from New Wave Kitakyushu |
| JEF United Chiba | Chiba & Ichihara, Chiba | Relegated from J1 League in 2009 |
| Kashiwa Reysol | Kashiwa, Chiba | Relegated from J1 League in 2009 |
| Kataller Toyama | All cities/towns in Toyama | |
| Mito HollyHock | Mito, Ibaraki | |
| Oita Trinita | All cities/towns in Oita | Relegated from J1 League in 2009 |
| Roasso Kumamoto | Kumamoto, Kumamoto | |
| Sagan Tosu | Tosu, Saga | |
| Thespa Kusatsu | All cities/towns in Gunma | |
| Tochigi SC | Utsunomiya, Tochigi | |
| Tokushima Vortis | All cities/towns in Tokushima | |
| Tokyo Verdy | All cities/towns in Tokyo | |
| Ventforet Kofu | All cities/towns in Yamanashi | |
| Yokohama FC | Yokohama, Kanagawa | |

== League format ==
Nineteen clubs will play in double round-robin (home and away) format, a total of 36 games each. A club receives 3 points for a win, 1 point for a tie, and 0 points for a loss. The clubs are ranked by points, and tie breakers are, in the following order:

- Goal differential
- Goals scored
- Head-to-head results
- Disciplinary points

A draw would be conducted, if necessary. However, if two clubs are tied at the first place, both clubs will be declared as the champions. Three top clubs will be promoted to J1 (see below).

Changes from Previous Year

- Nineteen participating clubs, increased by one, Giravanz Kitakyushu, from last year
- Due to abolishment of triple round-robin format, which has been applied for the past two seasons, and installation of double round-robin, the number of games per club decreased to 36, down from 51, the fewest games played in J2, as same as 1999 J2 season. Therefore, regular season schedule had a month break after June 13 games during 2010 FIFA World Cup, first World Cup break as J2 since the 2002 events held in Japan, then the season resumed from July 17.
- As in J1, J2 teams may now have 7 substitute players per match, up from 5.

== League table ==
| Pos | Team | Pld | W | D | L | GF | GA | GD | Pts | Promotion or relegation |
|---|---|---|---|---|---|---|---|---|---|---|
| 1 | Kashiwa Reysol (C, P) | 36 | 23 | 11 | 2 | 71 | 24 | +47 | 80 | Promotion to 2011 J. League Division 1 |
| 2 | Ventforet Kofu (P) | 36 | 19 | 13 | 4 | 71 | 40 | +31 | 70 | Promotion to 2011 J. League Division 1 |
| 3 | Avispa Fukuoka (P) | 36 | 21 | 6 | 9 | 63 | 34 | +29 | 69 | Promotion to 2011 J. League Division 1 |
| 4 | JEF United Chiba | 36 | 18 | 7 | 11 | 58 | 37 | +21 | 61 | |
| 5 | Tokyo Verdy | 36 | 17 | 7 | 12 | 47 | 34 | +13 | 58 | |
| 6 | Yokohama FC | 36 | 16 | 6 | 14 | 54 | 47 | +7 | 54 | |
| 7 | Roasso Kumamoto | 36 | 14 | 12 | 10 | 39 | 43 | −4 | 54 | |
| 8 | Tokushima Vortis | 36 | 15 | 6 | 15 | 51 | 47 | +4 | 51 | |
| 9 | Sagan Tosu | 36 | 13 | 12 | 11 | 42 | 41 | +1 | 51 | |
| 10 | Tochigi SC | 36 | 14 | 8 | 14 | 46 | 42 | +4 | 50 | |
| 11 | Ehime FC | 36 | 12 | 12 | 12 | 34 | 34 | 0 | 48 | |
| 12 | Thespa Kusatsu | 36 | 14 | 6 | 16 | 36 | 48 | −12 | 48 | |
| 13 | Consadole Sapporo | 36 | 11 | 13 | 12 | 37 | 38 | −1 | 46 | |
| 14 | FC Gifu | 36 | 13 | 6 | 17 | 32 | 45 | −13 | 45 | |
| 15 | Oita Trinita | 36 | 10 | 11 | 15 | 39 | 49 | −10 | 41 | |
| 16 | Mito HollyHock | 36 | 8 | 14 | 14 | 29 | 45 | −16 | 38 | |
| 17 | Fagiano Okayama | 36 | 8 | 8 | 20 | 27 | 51 | −24 | 32 | |
| 18 | Kataller Toyama | 36 | 8 | 4 | 24 | 39 | 71 | −32 | 28 | |
| 19 | Giravanz Kitakyushu | 36 | 1 | 12 | 23 | 20 | 65 | −45 | 15 | |

Updated to match(es) played on December 4, 2010. Source: J.League Division 2
Rules for classification: 1) points; 2) goal difference; 3) number of goals scored.
(C) Champions; (P) Promoted

== Results ==
| Home \ Away | AVI | CON | EHI | FAG | GIF | GIR | HOL | JEF | KAT | REY | ROS | SAG | SPA | TOC | TRI | VEN | VER | VOR | YFC |
|---|---|---|---|---|---|---|---|---|---|---|---|---|---|---|---|---|---|---|---|
| Avispa Fukuoka | | 0–0 | 2–0 | 0–0 | 0–2 | 2–0 | 5–0 | 2–1 | 5–0 | 0–2 | 6–1 | 0–1 | 2–1 | 2–3 | 2–1 | 3–1 | 3–2 | 1–0 | 2–1 |
| Consadole Sapporo | 0–3 | | 2–2 | 2–0 | 0–0 | 2–0 | 1–2 | 1–0 | 3–1 | 1–1 | 4–0 | 0–1 | 0–1 | 0–0 | 2–2 | 1–1 | 0–0 | 1–0 | 1–2 |
| Ehime FC | 2–1 | 2–1 | | 0–1 | 0–0 | 1–1 | 0–0 | 0–1 | 1–2 | 0–3 | 2–0 | 1–1 | 1–0 | 0–0 | 2–1 | 1–2 | 1–0 | 1–0 | 2–0 |
| Fagiano Okayama | 1–2 | 1–0 | 1–2 | | 2–2 | 0–0 | 2–1 | 2–1 | 1–2 | 0–2 | 0–0 | 2–1 | 0–1 | 1–2 | 1–0 | 0–4 | 0–1 | 1–2 | 0–1 |
| FC Gifu | 0–2 | 3–0 | 1–1 | 1–0 | | 1–0 | 1–0 | 1–0 | 2–1 | 0–2 | 1–1 | 0–1 | 2–1 | 4–2 | 2–0 | 0–1 | 0–1 | 2–1 | 0–1 |
| Giravanz Kitakyushu | 0–1 | 0–1 | 0–3 | 2–2 | 0–1 | | 1–1 | 0–3 | 1–2 | 0–2 | 2–2 | 0–1 | 0–1 | 1–1 | 1–1 | 0–0 | 1–0 | 1–3 | 1–4 |
| Mito HollyHock | 1–0 | 1–1 | 1–1 | 1–1 | 1–2 | 0–0 | | 1–0 | 3–1 | 1–4 | 0–1 | 0–0 | 1–1 | 2–1 | 2–1 | 2–2 | 0–4 | 0–2 | 3–1 |
| JEF United Chiba | 1–1 | 0–3 | 3–0 | 4–0 | 2–0 | 2–1 | 1–0 | | 2–1 | 2–3 | 2–0 | 2–0 | 2–1 | 2–1 | 5–0 | 1–2 | 2–1 | 1–1 | 4–0 |
| Kataller Toyama | 1–2 | 0–2 | 3–3 | 4–0 | 3–2 | 1–0 | 0–0 | 0–1 | | 1–2 | 0–2 | 2–1 | 1–2 | 0–3 | 1–3 | 0–3 | 2–3 | 2–3 | 2–1 |
| Kashiwa Reysol | 1–0 | 5–1 | 1–0 | 1–1 | 3–0 | 2–0 | 1–0 | 2–2 | 2–1 | | 0–0 | 2–0 | 3–2 | 1–1 | 2–1 | 2–2 | 0–1 | 6–0 | 2–0 |
| Roasso Kumamoto | 2–1 | 0–0 | 1–0 | 2–1 | 1–0 | 3–0 | 0–0 | 1–1 | 1–1 | 1–3 | | 2–0 | 0–1 | 0–2 | 0–0 | 0–1 | 3–2 | 2–1 | 0–2 |
| Sagan Tosu | 0–1 | 1–1 | 2–1 | 0–0 | 3–0 | 3–2 | 1–0 | 1–1 | 2–2 | 1–1 | 1–1 | | 0–0 | 3–1 | 0–0 | 1–2 | 0–1 | 1–0 | 4–4 |
| Thespa Kusatsu | 2–1 | 1–1 | 0–1 | 2–1 | 2–1 | 1–1 | 0–0 | 2–0 | 2–1 | 0–4 | 1–2 | 0–2 | | 2–1 | 1–3 | 1–4 | 1–0 | 1–4 | 0–3 |
| Tochigi SC | 1–2 | 0–1 | 1–0 | 1–2 | 2–0 | 2–0 | 0–1 | 2–2 | 1–0 | 0–0 | 1–2 | 2–1 | 0–0 | | 2–0 | 0–2 | 0–1 | 2–0 | 2–1 |
| Oita Trinita | 0–0 | 1–2 | 0–2 | 1–0 | 3–1 | 0–0 | 1–1 | 0–2 | 1–0 | 1–0 | 1–1 | 3–4 | 1–0 | 1–4 | | 0–1 | 1–1 | 1–0 | 2–2 |
| Ventforet Kofu | 2–2 | 4–1 | 1–1 | 1–0 | 0–0 | 6–0 | 1–1 | 2–2 | 5–0 | 1–1 | 3–3 | 0–2 | 2–4 | 4–3 | 3–3 | | 0–1 | 1–0 | 0–0 |
| Tokyo Verdy | 1–1 | 2–1 | 1–0 | 1–0 | 2–0 | 4–0 | 3–1 | 1–2 | 1–0 | 0–2 | 1–2 | 1–1 | 3–0 | 0–0 | 0–1 | 1–2 | | 1–1 | 1–1 |
| Tokushima Vortis | 2–3 | 0–0 | 0–0 | 2–3 | 4–0 | 4–4 | 3–1 | 3–1 | 1–0 | 1–1 | 1–0 | 2–1 | 1–0 | 4–0 | 0–3 | 0–1 | 2–3 | | 1–0 |
| Yokohama FC | 1–3 | 1–0 | 0–0 | 2–0 | 2–0 | 2–0 | 1–0 | 1–0 | 4–1 | 2–2 | 1–2 | 4–0 | 0–1 | 0–2 | 2–1 | 3–4 | 3–2 | 1–2 | |

Updated to match(es) played on December 4, 2010. Source: J. League Division 2
Legend: Blue = home team win; Yellow = draw; Red = away team win.

== Top scorers ==
| Rank | Scorer | Club | Goals |
|---|---|---|---|
| 1 | (Japan) Mike Havenaar | Ventforet Kofu | 20 |
| 2 | (Brazil) Ricardo Lobo | Tochigi SC | 16 |
| 2 | (Japan) Tomohiro Tsuda | Tokushima Vortis | 16 |
| 4 | (Japan) Genki Nagasato | Avispa Fukuoka | 15 |
| 5 | (Brazil) Paulinho | Ventforet Kofu | 14 |
| 6 | (Brazil) Leandro Domingues | Kashiwa Reysol | 13 |
| 6 | (Japan) Yohei Toyoda | Sagan Tosu | 13 |
| 8 | (Japan) Masashi Oguro (Note: Moved on loan to FC Tokyo after 17th week.) | Yokohama FC | 12 |
| 9 | (Japan) Ryohei Hayashi | Kashiwa Reysol | 11 |
| 10 | (Japan) Kazuki Hiramoto | Tokyo Verdy | 10 |
| 10 | (Japan) Masato Kudo | Kashiwa Reysol | 10 |
| 10 | (Japan) Kosuke Nakamachi | Avispa Fukuoka | 10 |
| 10 | (Brazil) Neto Baiano | JEF United Chiba | 10 |

== Attendance ==
| Pos | Team | Total | High | Low | Average | Change |
|---|---|---|---|---|---|---|
| 1 | Ventforet Kofu | 223,309 | 16,431 | 10,316 | 12,406 | +12.2% |
| 2 | JEF United Chiba | 210,394 | 18,031 | 8,381 | 11,689 | −20.6%^{†} |
| 3 | Consadole Sapporo | 193,280 | 26,875 | 5,429 | 10,738 | +5.2% |
| 4 | Oita Trinita | 188,340 | 14,518 | 4,594 | 10,463 | −43.2%^{†} |
| 5 | Avispa Fukuoka | 158,777 | 14,713 | 5,012 | 8,821 | +13.6% |
| 6 | Kashiwa Reysol | 145,766 | 10,768 | 6,844 | 8,098 | −31.0%^{†} |
| 7 | Fagiano Okayama | 128,900 | 11,290 | 4,025 | 7,161 | +16.2% |
| 8 | Roasso Kumamoto | 124,317 | 16,098 | 2,803 | 6,907 | +15.0% |
| 9 | Sagan Tosu | 119,392 | 12,301 | 3,658 | 6,633 | +11.7% |
| 10 | Yokohama FC | 104,230 | 10,809 | 3,553 | 5,791 | +63.8% |
| 11 | Tokyo Verdy | 100,297 | 25,110 | 2,512 | 5,639 | +1.2% |
| 12 | Tokushima Vortis | 83,057 | 11,115 | 2,117 | 4,614 | +13.3% |
| 13 | Kataller Toyama | 80,327 | 10,726 | 2,542 | 4,463 | +19.3% |
| 14 | Thespa Kusatsu | 79,638 | 9,382 | 2,232 | 4,424 | +2.2% |
| 15 | Ehime FC | 78,945 | 10,630 | 2,787 | 4,386 | +18.7% |
| 16 | Giravanz Kitakyushu | 75,393 | 7,470 | 2,389 | 4,189 | +22.9%^{‡} |
| 17 | Tochigi SC | 74,821 | 6,933 | 1,913 | 4,157 | −11.7% |
| 18 | Mito HollyHock | 64,949 | 10,181 | 1,456 | 3,608 | +35.0% |
| 19 | FC Gifu | 55,950 | 5,133 | 2,006 | 3,108 | −27.8% |
| | League total | 2,290,082 | 26,875 | 1,456 | 6,696 | +5.8% |

Updated to games played on December 4, 2010
Source: J. League Division 2
Notes:
^{†} Team played previous season in J1.
^{‡} Team played previous season in JFL.
