= 2012–13 Central Coast Mariners FC season =

Central Coast Mariners
2012–13 season
- Chairman: Peter Turnbull
- Manager: Graham Arnold
- A-League premiership (regular season): 2nd
- A-League championship (finals): 1st
- Asian Champions League: Round of 16 vs Guangzhou Evergrande
- Top goalscorer: League: Daniel McBreen (17); All: Daniel McBreen (19)
- Highest home attendance: 18,721 vs Western Sydney Wanderers; 2 March 2013
- Lowest home attendance: 6,885 vs Adelaide United; 1 December 2012
- Average home league attendance: 9,994; 17 December 2012
| Home colours | Away colours | Third colours |

The 2012–13 Central Coast Mariners season was the Central Coast Mariners's eighth A-League season. It included the 2012–13 A-League season (and the competition's subsequent finals) as well as the 2013 AFC Champions League.

== Squad ==
Note: Flags indicate national team as defined under FIFA eligibility rules; some limited exceptions apply. Players may hold more than one non-FIFA nationality.

| No. | Pos. | Nation | Player |
|---|---|---|---|
| 1 | GK | AUS | Mathew Ryan |
| 2 | FW | AUS | Daniel McBreen |
| 3 | DF | AUS | Joshua Rose |
| 4 | DF | AUS | Pedj Bojić |
| 5 | DF | AUS | Zachary Anderson |
| 6 | DF | NED | Patrick Zwaanswijk (Vice-captain) |
| 7 | MF | MLT | John Hutchinson (Captain) |
| 8 | MF | AUS | Adriano Pellegrino |
| 9 | FW | AUS | Bernie Ibini-Isei (Youth) |
| 10 | MF | AUS | Tom Rogić (Youth) |
| 11 | MF | AUS | Oliver Bozanić |
| 12 | MF | AUS | Troy Hearfield |
| 13 | DF | AUS | Brent Griffiths |
| 14 | MF | NZL | Michael McGlinchey |

| No. | Pos. | Nation | Player |
|---|---|---|---|
| 15 | DF | PNG | Brad McDonald |
| 16 | DF | AUS | Trent Sainsbury (Youth) |
| 17 | MF | AUS | Anthony Caceres (Youth) |
| 18 | MF | SCO | Nick Montgomery |
| 19 | FW | AUS | Mitchell Duke |
| 20 | GK | AUS | Justin Pasfield |
| 21 | FW | AUS | Mile Sterjovski |
| 22 | DF | AUS | Jimmy Oates |
| 23 | FW | AUS | Adam Kwasnik |
| 24 | DF | AUS | Hayden Morton |
| 25 | DF | AUS | Michael Neill |
| 29 | MF | AUS | Nicholas Fitzgerald |
| 30 | GK | AUS | David Bradasevic |

=== Transfers ===
In

| Name | Position | Moving from | Notes |
|---|---|---|---|
| (Australia) Mitchell Duke | Forward | Youth Squad | Two year contract |
| (Australia) James Oates | Defender | Youth Squad | One year contract |
| (Australia) Anthony Caceres | Midfielder | Youth Squad | One year contract |
| (Australia) Zachary Anderson | Defender | Gold Coast United | Two year contract |
| (Australia) Mile Sterjovski | Forward | (China) Dalian Aerbin | One year contract |
| (Australia) Brent Griffiths | Defender | Wellington Phoenix | One year contract |
| (Scotland) Nick Montgomery | Midfielder | (England) Sheffield United | Three year contract |
| (Australia) Nicholas Fitzgerald | Midfielder | Brisbane Roar | |

Out

| Name | Position | Moving to | Notes |
|---|---|---|---|
| (Australia) Stuart Musialik | Midfielder | Free agent | Contract not renewed |
| (England) John Sutton | Forward | (Scotland) Heart of Midlothian | End of loan deal |
| (Australia) Sam Gallagher | Defender | Melbourne Victory | |
| (Australia) Mustafa Amini | Midfielder | (Germany) Borussia Dortmund | End of loan deal |
| (Australia) Brad Porter | Midfielder | Retired | |
| (Australia) Alex Wilkinson | Defender | (South Korea) Jeonbuk Motors | |
| (Australia) Trent McClenahan | Defender | Sydney FC | ACL squad player |
| (Australia) Tom Rogic | Midfielder | (Scotland) Celtic FC | Reported transfer fee: A$600 000 |

== Pre-season and friendlies ==
| 16 August 2012 | New Caledonia | 1–1 | Central Coast Mariners | Stade Numa-Daly Magenta, Noumea |
| | Kayara 56' | Report | Ibini-Isei 10' |

| 18 August 2012 | New Caledonia | 2–4 | Central Coast Mariners | Stade Numa-Daly Magenta, Noumea |
| | Kayara 61', 81' | Report | Duke 3', 74'; Hearfield 42'; Ibini-Isei 75' |

| 29 August 2012 | Bankstown City Lions | 0–4 | Central Coast Mariners | Jensen Oval, Sefton |
| Wednesday, 19:30 | | Report | McBreen 28' (pen.); Hearfield 29', 72'; Rogic 85' |

| 6 September 2012 | Central Coast Football Select XI | 0–7 | Central Coast Mariners | Bluetongue Stadium, Gosford |
| | | Report | Duke 9', 37'; Hutchinson 30'; Kwasnik 42'; Hearfield 45+1'; Sainsbury 48'; Gibbs 84' | Attendance: 1 430; Referee: Adam Gehrig |

| 12 September 2012 | Adelaide United | 2–0 | Central Coast Mariners | Hindmarsh Stadium, Adelaide |
| Wednesday, 19:30 | Cassio 61' van Dijk 90+2' | Report |

| 16 September 2012 | Central Coast Mariners | 1–1 | Melbourne Victory | Knox Grammar School, Wahroonga |
| Sunday, 15:00 | Zwaanswijk 3' | Report | Thompson 61' | Attendance: 2 000 |

| 19 September 2012 | Central Coast Mariners | 1–2 | Newcastle Jets | Central Coast Mariners Centre of Excellence, Tuggerah |
| | Peterson 74' | Report | Ribeiro 13'; Cooper 42' | Attendance: N/A (training match) |

| 23 September 2012 | Brisbane Roar | 0–1 | Central Coast Mariners | Stockland Park, Sunshine Coast |
| Sunday, 15:00 | | Report | Rogic 80' |

== Competitions ==
All times listed in Gosford local time.

=== Overall ===
| Competition | Started round | Current position / round | Final position / round | First match | Last match |
|---|---|---|---|---|---|
| A-League | — | — | runner-up | 6 October 2012 | 30 March 2013 |
| AFC Champions League | Group Stages | — | Round of 16 | 27 February 2013 | 22 May 2013 |
| A-League Final series | Semi-finals | — | champions | 14 April 2013 | 21 April 2013 |

=== A-League ===
==== League table ====
| Pos | Team | Pld | W | D | L | GF | GA | GD | Pts | Qualification |
|---|---|---|---|---|---|---|---|---|---|---|
| 1 | Western Sydney Wanderers | 27 | 18 | 3 | 6 | 41 | 21 | +20 | 57 | Qualification for 2014 AFC Champions League group stage and finals series |
| 2 | Central Coast Mariners (C) | 27 | 16 | 6 | 5 | 48 | 22 | +26 | 54 | Qualification for 2014 AFC Champions League group stage and finals series |
| 3 | Melbourne Victory | 27 | 13 | 5 | 9 | 48 | 45 | +3 | 44 | Qualification for 2014 AFC Champions League qualifying play-off and finals series (Note: Since the winner of 2013 A-League Grand Final (Central Coast Mariners) qualified for the 2014 AFC Champions League group stage, the 3rd placed team qualified for the qualifying play-off of 2014 AFC Champions League.) |
| 4 | Adelaide United | 27 | 12 | 5 | 10 | 38 | 37 | +1 | 41 | Qualification for Finals series |
| 5 | Brisbane Roar | 27 | 10 | 5 | 12 | 33 | 29 | +4 | 35 | Qualification for Finals series |
| 6 | Perth Glory | 27 | 9 | 5 | 13 | 29 | 31 | −2 | 32 | Qualification for Finals series |
| 7 | Sydney FC | 27 | 9 | 5 | 13 | 41 | 51 | −10 | 32 | |
| 8 | Newcastle Jets | 27 | 8 | 7 | 12 | 30 | 45 | −15 | 31 | |
| 9 | Melbourne Heart | 27 | 8 | 3 | 16 | 31 | 40 | −9 | 27 | |
| 10 | Wellington Phoenix (Note: Wellington Phoenix cannot qualify for the AFC Champions League as they are not recognised as an AFC club.) | 27 | 7 | 6 | 14 | 31 | 49 | −18 | 27 | |

Updated to match(es) played on 30 March 2013. Source: ultimatealeague.com
Rules for classification: 1) points; 2) goal difference; 3) number of goals scored.
(C) Champions

==== Matches ====
| 6 October 2012 1 | Western Sydney Wanderers | 0–0 | Central Coast Mariners | Parramatta, Australia |
| 20:45 AEST (UTC+10) | | Report | | Stadium: Parramatta Stadium; Attendance: 10,458; Referee: Alan Milliner |

| 14 October 2012 2 | Central Coast Mariners | 1–0 | Perth Glory | Gosford, Australia |
| 18:00 AEST (UTC+11) | McBreen 70' | Report | | Stadium: Bluetongue Stadium; Attendance: 9,192; Referee: Jarred Gillett |

| 20 October 2012 3 | Newcastle Jets | 2–1 | Central Coast Mariners | Newcastle, Australia |
| 18:30 AEST (UTC+11) | Griffiths 5' (pen.); Heskey 60' | Report | Ibini-Isei 71' | Stadium: Hunter Stadium; Attendance: 15,289; Referee: Ben Williams |

| 28 October 2012 4 | Melbourne Heart | 0–1 | Central Coast Mariners | Melbourne, Australia |
| 15:00 AEST (UTC+11) | | Report | Bojic 51' | Stadium: AAMI Park; Attendance: 6,357; Referee: Chris Beath |

| 3 November 2012 5 | Central Coast Mariners | 7–2 | Sydney FC | Gosford, Australia |
| 19:30 AEST (UTC+11) | Rogic 16', 62'; Ryall 29' (o.g.); McBreen 39' (pen.), 65', 67'; McGlinchey 55' | Report | Yau 8'; Abbas 54' | Stadium: Bluetongue Stadium; Attendance: 15,686; Referee: Strebre Delovski |

| 11 November 2012 6 | Wellington Phoenix | 0–1 | Central Coast Mariners | Wellington, New Zealand |
| 14:30 AEST (UTC+11) | | Report | McBreen 69' | Stadium: Westpac Stadium; Attendance: 6,568; Referee: Lucien Laverdure |

| 17 November 2012 7 | Melbourne Victory | 2–2 | Central Coast Mariners | Melbourne, Australia |
| 19:45 AEST (UTC+11) | Nabbout 10'; Milligan 40' | Report | McBreen 4', 22'; Zwaanswijk (yellow card) 6' (yellow-red card) 51' | Stadium: Etihad Stadium; Attendance: 19,462; Referee: Strebre Delovski |

| 25 November 2012 8 | Central Coast Mariners | 2–1 | Brisbane Roar | Gosford, Australia |
| 17:00 AEST (UTC+11) | Ibini-Isei 4'; Rogic 81' | Report | Murdocca 32' | Stadium: Bluetongue Stadium; Attendance: 9,084; Referee: Chris Beath |

| 1 December 2012 9 | Central Coast Mariners | 2–1 | Adelaide United | Gosford, Australia |
| 17:30 AEST (UTC+11) | Rose 45'; Montgomery 76' | Report | Djite 17' | Stadium: Bluetongue Stadium; Attendance: 6,885; Referee: Alan Milliner |

| 8 December 2012 10 | Newcastle Jets | 0–2 | Central Coast Mariners | Newcastle, Australia |
| 19:45 AEST (UTC+11) | | Report | McBreen 49', 66' | Stadium: Hunter Stadium; Attendance: 13,112; Referee: Jarred Gillett |

| 14 December 2012 11 | Central Coast Mariners | 2–0 | Melbourne Heart | Gosford, Australia |
| 19:30 AEST (UTC+11) | Bojić 50', 69' | Summary | | Stadium: Bluetongue Stadium; Attendance: 6,921; Referee: Lucien Laverdure |

| 22 December 2012 12 | Wellington Phoenix | 1–1 | Central Coast Mariners | Wellington, New Zealand |
| 15:00 AEST (UTC+11) | Sánchez 84' | Summary | McBreen 45' | Stadium: Westpac Stadium; Referee: Peter O'Leary |

| 27 December 2012 13 | Sydney FC | 1–0 | Central Coast Mariners | Sydney, Australia |
| 19:30 AEST (UTC+11) | Emerton 89' | Summary | Hutchinson (yellow card) 85' (yellow-red card) 90+4'; Rogić (red card) 90+6' | Stadium: Allianz Stadium; Attendance: 16,887; Referee: Peter Green |

| 31 December 2012 14 | Central Coast Mariners | 1–0 | Perth Glory | Gosford, Australia |
| 18:00 AEST (UTC+11) | Ibini-Isei 68' | Summary | van den Brink (yellow card) 58' (yellow-red card) 76' | Stadium: Bluetongue Stadium; Attendance: 14,591; Referee: Strebre Delovski |

| 6 January 2013 15 | Western Sydney Wanderers | 0–2 | Central Coast Mariners | Parramatta, Australia |
| 18:00 AEST (UTC+11) | Trifiro (yellow card) 23' (yellow-red card) 54' | Summary | McBreen 42', 90' | Stadium: Parramatta Stadium; Attendance: 16,387; Referee: Chris Beath |

| 12 January 2013 16 | Melbourne Victory | 1–1 | Central Coast Mariners | Launceston, Australia |
| 17:30 AEST (UTC+11) | Flores 42' | Summary | McBreen 78' (pen.) | Stadium: Aurora Stadium; Attendance: 6,238; Referee: Jarred Gillett |

| 19 January 2013 17 | Central Coast Mariners | 0–0 | Newcastle Jets | Gosford, Australia |
| 19:45 AEST (UTC+11) | | Summary | | Stadium: Bluetongue Stadium; Attendance: 11,249; Referee: Alan Milliner |

| 25 January 2013 18 | Central Coast Mariners | 3–1 | Adelaide United | Gosford, Australia |
| 19:30 AEST (UTC+11) | Duke 67', 72'; McGlinchey 88' | Summary | Bowles 39' | Stadium: Bluetongue Stadium; Referee: Peter O'Leary |

| 1 February 2013 19 | Brisbane Roar | 2–2 | Central Coast Mariners | Brisbane, Australia |
| 20:00 AEST (UTC+11) | Berisha 47', 69' | Summary | McGlinchey 8'; McBreen 80' | Stadium: Suncorp Stadium; Referee: Lucien Laverdue |

| 7 February 2013 20 | Central Coast Mariners | 5–0 | Wellington Phoenix | Gosford, Australia |
| 19:00 AEST (UTC+11) | Ibini-Isei 30', 86'; Hutchinson 65'; McBreen 69'; Duke 89' | Summary | | Stadium: Bluetongue Stadium; Referee: Kristian Griffiths-Jones |

| 16 February 2013 21 | Perth Glory | 2–1 | Central Coast Mariners | Perth, Australia |
| 21:45 AEST (UTC+11) | Dodd 27'; Smeltz 65' | Summary | Ibini-Isei 13' | Stadium: NIB Stadium; Attendance: 5,909; Referee: Jarred Gillett |

| 23 February 2013 22 | Central Coast Mariners | 6–2 | Melbourne Victory | Gosford, Australia |
| 19:45 AEST (UTC+11) | Duke 18', 32'; McGlinchey 57', 87', 90'; Fitzgerald 81' | Summary | Milligan 23' (pen.); Sainsbury 68' (o.g.) | Stadium: Bluetongue Stadium; Attendance: 6081; Referee: Strebre Delovski |

| 2 March 2013 23 | Central Coast Mariners | 0–1 | Western Sydney Wanderers | Gosford, Australia |
| 19:45 AEST (UTC+11) | | Summary | Haliti 81' | Stadium: Bluetongue Stadium; Attendance: 18,721; Referee: Alan Milliner |

| 9 March 2013 24 | Sydney FC | 2–0 | Central Coast Mariners | Sydney, Australia |
| 17:30 AEST (UTC+11) | Ryall 25'; Chianese 73' | Summary | | Stadium: Allianz Stadium; Attendance: 16,155; Referee: Jarred Gillett |

| 17 March 2013 25 | Central Coast Mariners | 1–0 | Brisbane Roar | Gosford, Australia |
| 17:00 AEST (UTC+11) | Ibini-Isei 34' | Summary | | Stadium: Bluetongue Stadium; Attendance: 7,221; Referee: Alan Milliner |

| 24 March 2013 26 | Adelaide United | 0–2 | Central Coast Mariners | Adelaide, Australia |
| 19:00 AEST (UTC+11) | | Summary | McBreen 4'; Sterjovski 90+4' | Stadium: Hindmarsh Stadium; Attendance: 8,069; Referee: Shaun Evans |

| 30 March 2013 27 | Central Coast Mariners | 2–1 | Melbourne Heart | Gosford, Australia |
| 17:30 AEST (UTC+11) | McBreen 35' (pen.); Duke 63' | Summary | Gerhardt (red card) 34'; Garcia 73' | Stadium: Bluetongue Stadium; Attendance: 8,271; Referee: Jarred Gillett |

=== A-League Finals series ===
| 14 April 2013 Semi-final | Central Coast Mariners | 1–0 | Melbourne Victory | Gosford, Australia |
| 17:00 AEST (UTC+11) | McBreen 42'; Montgomery (yellow card) 59' (yellow-red card) 90+1' | Report | | Stadium: Bluetongue Stadium; Attendance: 10,651; Referee: Strebre Delovski |

| 21 April 2013 Grand Final | Western Sydney Wanderers | 0–2 | Central Coast Mariners | Sydney, Australia |
| 16:00 AEST (UTC+11) | | Report | Zwaanswijk 44'; McBreen 68' (pen.) | Stadium: Allianz Stadium; Attendance: 42,102; Referee: Peter Green |

=== AFC Champions League ===
==== Group stage ====
| Pos | Team | Pld | W | D | L | GF | GA | GD | Pts | Qualification | KSW | CCM | GUI | SUW |
|---|---|---|---|---|---|---|---|---|---|---|---|---|---|---|
| 1 | (Japan) Kashiwa Reysol | 6 | 4 | 2 | 0 | 14 | 4 | +10 | 14 | Advance to knockout stage | — | 3–1 | 1–1 | 0–0 |
| 2 | (Australia) Central Coast Mariners | 6 | 2 | 1 | 3 | 5 | 9 | −4 | 7 | Advance to knockout stage | 0–3 | — | 2–1 | 0–0 |
| 3 | (China) Guizhou Renhe | 6 | 1 | 3 | 2 | 6 | 7 | −1 | 6 | | 0–1 | 2–1 | — | 2–2 |
| 4 | (South Korea) Suwon Samsung Bluewings | 6 | 0 | 4 | 2 | 4 | 9 | −5 | 4 | | 2–6 | 0–1 | 0–0 | — |

| 27 February 2013 1 | Central Coast Mariners (Australia) | 0–0 | (South Korea) Suwon Samsung Bluewings | Gosford, Australia |
| 19:00 AEST (UTC+11) | | Report; Summary | | Stadium: Bluetongue Stadium; Attendance: 4,529; Referee: Ali Abdulnabi (Bahrain) |

| 13 March 2013 2 | Kashiwa Reysol (Japan) | 3–1 | (Australia) Central Coast Mariners | Kashiwa, Japan |
| 21:00 AEST (UTC+11) | Leandro Domingues 21', 88'; Kano 67' | Report; Summary | Zwaanswijk 8' | Stadium: Hitachi Kashiwa Soccer Stadium; Attendance: 6,472; Referee: Ali Al-Badwawi (UAE) |

| 3 April 2013 3 | Central Coast Mariners (Australia) | 2–1 | (China) Guizhou Renhe | Gosford, Australia |
| 19:00 AEST (UTC+11) | Bojić 50'; Sainsbury 80' | Report | Ryan 71' (o.g.) | Stadium: Bluetongue Stadium; Referee: Abdullah Balideh (Qatar) |

| 9 April 2013 4 | Guizhou Renhe (China) | 2–1 | (Australia) Central Coast Mariners | Guiyang, China |
| 21:30 AEST (UTC+10) | Muslimović 84'; Qu Bo 86' | Report | Duke 43' (pen.) | Stadium: Guiyang Olympic Sports Center; Referee: Abdulla Hassan Mohamed (United Arab Emirates) |

| 23 April 2013 5 | Suwon Samsung Bluewings (South Korea) | 0–1 | (Australia) Central Coast Mariners | Suwon, South Korea |
| 20:30 AEST (UTC+10) | | [ Summary] | McGlinchey 81' | Stadium: Suwon World Cup Stadium; Referee: Marai Al Awaji (Saudi Arabia) |

| 30 April 2013 6 | Central Coast Mariners (Australia) | 0–3 | (Japan) Kashiwa Reysol | Gosford, Australia |
| 20:30 AEST (UTC+10) | | Report | Kudo 59'; Cléo 79'; Domingues 85' | Stadium: Bluetongue Stadium; Referee: Valentin Kovalenko (Uzbekistan) |

==== Knockout stage ====
| 15 May 2013 Round of 16 1st Leg | Central Coast Mariners (Australia) | 1–2 | (China) Guangzhou Evergrande | Gosford, Australia |
| 19:30 AEST (UTC+10) | Duke 7' | Report | Barrios 28'; Muriqui 76' | Stadium: Bluetongue Stadium; Attendance: 8,953; Referee: Abdul Malik Abdul Bashir (Singapore) |

| 22 May 2013 Round of 16 2nd Leg | Guangzhou Evergrande (China) | 3–0 (5–1 agg.) | (Australia) Central Coast Mariners | Guangzhou, China |
| 22:00 AEST (UTC+10) | Muriqui 7'; Conca 45+1' (pen.); Gao Lin 68' | Report | | Stadium: Tianhe Stadium; Attendance: 39,564; Referee: Abdulrahman Abdou (Qatar) |

== Squad statistics ==
As of 22 May 2013

=== Appearances and goals ===
| No. | Pos | Nat | Player | Total | | A League | | Finals | | AFC Champions League | |
| No. | Pos | Nat | Player | Apps | Goals | Apps | Goals | Apps | Goals | Apps | Goals |
|---|---|---|---|---|---|---|---|---|---|---|---|
| 1 | GK | (Australia) AUS | Mathew Ryan | 33 | 0 | 23+0 | 0 | 2+0 | 0 | 8+0 | 0 |
| 2 | FW | (Australia) AUS | Daniel McBreen | 33 | 19 | 24+1 | 17 | 2+0 | 2 | 6+0 | 0 |
| 3 | DF | (Australia) AUS | Joshua Rose | 34 | 1 | 26+0 | 1 | 2+0 | 0 | 6+0 | 0 |
| 4 | DF | (Australia) AUS | Pedj Bojić | 30 | 4 | 23+0 | 3 | 2+0 | 0 | 5+0 | 1 |
| 5 | DF | (Australia) AUS | Zachary Anderson | 29 | 0 | 11+12 | 0 | 0+0 | 0 | 6+0 | 0 |
| 6 | DF | (Netherlands) NED | Patrick Zwaanswijk | 31 | 2 | 22+1 | 0 | 2+0 | 1 | 5+1 | 1 |
| 7 | MF | (Malta) MLT | John Hutchinson | 33 | 1 | 24+1 | 1 | 2+0 | 0 | 6+0 | 0 |
| 8 | MF | (Australia) AUS | Adriano Pellegrino | 9 | 0 | 2+5 | 0 | 0+0 | 0 | 2+0 | 0 |
| 9 | FW | (Australia) AUS | Bernie Ibini-Isei | 35 | 7 | 16+9 | 7 | 2+0 | 0 | 5+3 | 0 |
| 11 | MF | (Australia) AUS | Oliver Bozanic | 23 | 0 | 9+5 | 0 | 1+0 | 0 | 4+4 | 0 |
| 13 | DF | (Australia) AUS | Brent Griffiths | 7 | 0 | 1+4 | 0 | 0+0 | 0 | 2+0 | 0 |
| 14 | MF | (New Zealand) NZL | Michael McGlinchey | 33 | 7 | 24+0 | 6 | 2+0 | 0 | 5+2 | 1 |
| 15 | MF | (Papua New Guinea) PNG | Brad McDonald | 2 | 0 | 1+0 | 0 | 0+0 | 0 | 0+1 | 0 |
| 16 | DF | (Australia) AUS | Trent Sainsbury | 33 | 1 | 24+0 | 0 | 2+0 | 0 | 7+0 | 1 |
| 17 | MF | (Australia) AUS | Anthony Caceres | 5 | 0 | 2+1 | 0 | 0+0 | 0 | 2+0 | 0 |
| 18 | MF | (Scotland) SCO | Nick Montgomery | 33 | 1 | 23+2 | 1 | 1+0 | 0 | 6+1 | 0 |
| 19 | FW | (Australia) AUS | Mitchell Duke | 28 | 8 | 5+14 | 6 | 0+2 | 0 | 5+2 | 2 |
| 20 | GK | (Australia) AUS | Justin Pasfield | 4 | 0 | 4+0 | 0 | 0+0 | 0 | 0+0 | 0 |
| 21 | FW | (Australia) AUS | Mile Sterjovski | 26 | 1 | 16+3 | 1 | 2+0 | 0 | 3+2 | 0 |
| 23 | FW | (Australia) AUS | Adam Kwasnik | 4 | 0 | 3+1 | 0 | 0+0 | 0 | 0+0 | 0 |
| 24 | DF | (Australia) AUS | Hayden Morton | 3 | 0 | 1+1 | 0 | 0+0 | 0 | 1+0 | 0 |
| 25 | DF | (Australia) AUS | Michael Neill | 0 | 0 | 0+0 | 0 | 0+0 | 0 | 0+0 | 0 |
| 29 | FW | (Australia) AUS | Nicholas Fitzgerald | 15 | 1 | 2+6 | 1 | 0+1 | 0 | 4+2 | 0 |
| 30 | GK | (Australia) AUS | David Bradasevic | 0 | 0 | 0+0 | 0 | 0+0 | 0 | 0+0 | 0 |
Players no longer at the club:
| 10 | MF | (Australia) AUS | Tom Rogić | 11 | 3 | 11+0 | 3 | 0+0 | 0 | 0+0 | 0 |
| 12 | MF | (Australia) AUS | Troy Hearfield | 4 | 0 | 0+4 | 0 | 0+0 | 0 | 0+0 | 0 |
| 22 | DF | (Australia) AUS | Jimmy Oates | 0 | 0 | 0+0 | 0 | 0+0 | 0 | 0+0 | 0 |

=== Goal scorers ===
| Rank | Player | | A League | | | | | | | | | | | | | | | | | | | | | | | | | | | | Finals | | | Champions League | | | | | | | | | Total |
| Rank | Player | | 1 | 2 | 3 | 4 | 5 | 6 | 7 | 8 | 9 | 10 | 11 | 12 | 13 | 14 | 15 | 16 | 17 | 18 | 19 | 20 | 21 | 22 | 23 | 24 | 25 | 26 | 27 | Total | SF | GF | Total | 1 | 2 | 3 | 4 | 5 | 6 | R16-1 | R16-2 | Total | Total |
|---|---|---|---|---|---|---|---|---|---|---|---|---|---|---|---|---|---|---|---|---|---|---|---|---|---|---|---|---|---|---|---|---|---|---|---|---|---|---|---|---|---|---|---|
| 1 | (Australia) | Daniel McBreen | | 1 | | | 3 | 1 | 2 | | | 2 | | 1 | | | 2 | 1 | | | 1 | 1 | | | | | | 1 | 1 | 17 | 1 | 1 | 2 | | | | | | | | | 0 | 19 |
| 2 | (Australia) | Mitchell Duke | | | | | | | | | | | | | | | | | 2 | | | 1 | | 2 | | | | | 1 | 6 | | | 0 | | | | 1 | | | 1 | | 2 | 8 |
| 3 | (Australia) | Bernie Ibini-Isei | | | 1 | | | | | 1 | | | | | | 1 | | | | | | 2 | 1 | | | | 1 | | | 7 | | | 0 | | | | | | | | | 0 | 7 |
| 3 | (New Zealand) | Michael McGlinchey | | | | | 1 | | | | | | | | | | | | 1 | | 1 | | | 3 | | | | | | 6 | | | 0 | | | | | 1 | | | | 1 | 7 |
| 5 | (Australia) | Pedj Bojić | | | | 1 | | | | | | | 2 | | | | | | | | | | | | | | | | | 3 | | | 0 | | | 1 | | | | | | 1 | 4 |
| 6 | (Australia) | Tom Rogić | | | | | 2 | | | 1 | | | | | | | | | | | | | | | | | | | | 3 | | | 0 | | | | | | | | | 0 | 3 |
| 7 | (Netherlands) | Patrick Zwaanswijk | | | | | | | | | | | | | | | | | | | | | | | | | | | | 0 | | 1 | 1 | | 1 | | | | | | | 1 | 2 |
| 8 | | Own goal | | | | | 1 | | | | | | | | | | | | | | | | | | | | | | | 1 | | | 0 | | | | | | | | | 0 | 1 |
| 8 | (Australia) | Joshua Rose | | | | | | | | | 1 | | | | | | | | | | | | | | | | | | | 1 | | | 0 | | | | | | | | | 0 | 1 |
| 8 | (Scotland) | Nick Montgomery | | | | | | | | | 1 | | | | | | | | | | | | | | | | | | | 1 | | | 0 | | | | | | | | | 0 | 1 |
| 8 | (Malta) | John Hutchinson | | | | | | | | | | | | | | | | | | | | 1 | | | | | | | | 1 | | | 0 | | | | | | | | | 0 | 1 |
| 8 | (Australia) | Nicholas Fitzgerald | | | | | | | | | | | | | | | | | | | | | | 1 | | | | | | 1 | | | 0 | | | | | | | | | 0 | 1 |
| 8 | (Australia) | Mile Sterjovski | | | | | | | | | | | | | | | | | | | | | | | | | | 1 | | 1 | | | 0 | | | | | | | | | 0 | 1 |
| 8 | (Australia) | Trent Sainsbury | | | | | | | | | | | | | | | | | | | | | | | | | | | | 0 | | | 0 | | | 1 | | | | | | 1 | 1 |

| A goal was scored from a penalty kick |
| 2 were scored from penalty kicks |

=== Disciplinary record ===
| No. | Position | Name | A League | | | Finals | | | Champions League | | | Total | | |
| No. | Position | Name | Yellow card | Yellow card Yellow card Red card | Red card | Yellow card | Yellow card Yellow card Red card | Red card | Yellow card | Yellow card Yellow card Red card | Red card | Yellow card | Yellow card Yellow card Red card | Red card |
|---|---|---|---|---|---|---|---|---|---|---|---|---|---|---|
| 1 | GK | (Australia) Mathew Ryan | 1 | 0 | 0 | 0 | 0 | 0 | 1 | 0 | 0 | 2 | 0 | 0 |
| 2 | FW | (Australia) Daniel McBreen | 7 | 0 | 0 | 1 | 0 | 0 | 2 | 0 | 0 | 10 | 0 | 0 |
| 3 | DF | (Australia) Joshua Rose | 2 | 0 | 0 | 0 | 0 | 0 | 0 | 0 | 0 | 1 | 0 | 0 |
| 4 | DF | (Australia) Pedj Bojić | 6 | 0 | 0 | 0 | 0 | 0 | 0 | 0 | 0 | 6 | 0 | 0 |
| 6 | DF | (Netherlands) Patrick Zwaanswijk | 6 | 1 | 0 | 0 | 0 | 0 | 2 | 0 | 0 | 8 | 1 | 0 |
| 7 | MF | (Malta) John Hutchinson | 8 | 1 | 0 | 0 | 0 | 0 | 3 | 0 | 0 | 11 | 1 | 0 |
| 9 | FW | (Australia) Bernie Ibini-Isei | 1 | 0 | 0 | 0 | 0 | 0 | 1 | 0 | 0 | 2 | 0 | 0 |
| 10 | MF | (Australia) Tom Rogić | 0 | 0 | 1 | – | – | – | – | – | – | 0 | 0 | 1 |
| 11 | MF | (Australia) Oliver Bozanic | 1 | 0 | 0 | 0 | 0 | 0 | 0 | 0 | 0 | 1 | 0 | 0 |
| 13 | DF | (Australia) Brent Griffiths | 0 | 0 | 0 | 0 | 0 | 0 | 2 | 0 | 0 | 2 | 0 | 0 |
| 14 | MF | (New Zealand) Michael McGlinchey | 4 | 0 | 0 | 1 | 0 | 0 | 0 | 0 | 0 | 5 | 0 | 0 |
| 16 | DF | (Australia) Trent Sainsbury | 3 | 0 | 0 | 0 | 0 | 0 | 1 | 0 | 0 | 4 | 0 | 0 |
| 18 | MF | (Scotland) Nick Montgomery | 6 | 0 | 0 | 0 | 1 | 0 | 0 | 0 | 0 | 6 | 1 | 0 |
| 19 | FW | (Australia) Mitchell Duke | 1 | 0 | 0 | 0 | 0 | 0 | 1 | 0 | 0 | 2 | 0 | 0 |
| 21 | FW | (Australia) Mile Sterjovski | 2 | 0 | 0 | 0 | 0 | 0 | 0 | 0 | 0 | 2 | 0 | 0 |
| 24 | DF | (Australia) Hayden Morton | 1 | 0 | 0 | 0 | 0 | 0 | 0 | 0 | 0 | 1 | 0 | 0 |
| 29 | MF | (Australia) Nicholas Fitzgerald | 1 | 0 | 0 | 0 | 0 | 0 | 0 | 0 | 0 | 1 | 0 | 0 |

== Awards ==
- Australia U20 Player of the year: Mathew Ryan
- A-League Young Player of the Month (November): Tom Rogic
- A-League Young Player of the Month (February): Bernie Ibini-Isei
- A-League Young Player of the Month (March): Trent Sainsbury
- 2012-13 A-League Golden Boot: Daniel McBreen
- Joe Marston Medal: Daniel McBreen
- PFA A-League Team of the Year: Daniel McBreen, Michael McGlinchey, Trent Sainsbury
