= 2013 AFC Champions League knockout stage =

Association football tournament

The knock-out stage of the 2013 AFC Champions League was played from 14 May to 9 November 2013. A total of 16 teams competed in the knock-out stage.

== Qualified teams ==
The winners and runners-up of each of the eight groups in the group stage qualified for the knock-out stage. Both West Zone and East Zone had eight teams qualified.

Group	Winners	Runners-up
West Zone (Groups A–D)
A	(Saudi Arabia) Al-Shabab	(Qatar) El Jaish
B	(Qatar) Lekhwiya	(United Arab Emirates) Al-Shabab Al-Arabi
C	(Saudi Arabia) Al-Ahli	(Qatar) Al-Gharafa
D	(Iran) Esteghlal	(Saudi Arabia) Al-Hilal
East Zone (Groups E–H)
E	(South Korea) FC Seoul	(Thailand) Buriram United
F	(China) Guangzhou Evergrande	(South Korea) Jeonbuk Hyundai Motors
G	(Uzbekistan) Bunyodkor	(China) Beijing Guoan
H	(Japan) Kashiwa Reysol	(Australia) Central Coast Mariners

== Format ==
In the knock-out stage, the 16 teams played a single-elimination tournament. Each tie was played on a home-and-away two-legged basis. The away goals rule, extra time (away goals do not apply in extra time) and penalty shoot-out were used to decide the winner if necessary.

== Schedule ==
The schedule of each round was as follows.

Round	First leg	Second leg
Round of 16	14–15 May 2013	21–22 May 2013
Quarter-finals	21 August 2013	18 September 2013
Semi-finals	25 September 2013	2 October 2013
Final	25 or 26 October 2013	8 or 9 November 2013

== Bracket ==
In the round of 16, the winners of one group played the runners-up of another group in the same zone, with the group winners hosting the second leg. The matchups were determined as follows:

West Zone

- Winner Group A vs. Runner-up Group C
- Winner Group C vs. Runner-up Group A
- Winner Group B vs. Runner-up Group D
- Winner Group D vs. Runner-up Group B

East Zone

- Winner Group E vs. Runner-up Group G
- Winner Group G vs. Runner-up Group E
- Winner Group F vs. Runner-up Group H
- Winner Group H vs. Runner-up Group F

The draw for the quarter-finals, semi-finals, and final (to decide the order of two legs) was held on 20 June 2013, 16:00 UTC+8, at the AFC House in Kuala Lumpur, Malaysia. In this draw, teams from different zones could play each other, and the "country protection" rule was applied: if there are exactly two teams from the same association, they may not play each other in the quarter-finals; however, if there are more than two teams from the same association, they may play each other in the quarter-finals.

Round of 16
(Qatar) El Jaish	1	0	1
(Saudi Arabia) Al-Ahli	1	2	3
(China) Beijing Guoan	0	1	1
(South Korea) FC Seoul	0	3	3
(United Arab Emirates) Al-Shabab Al-Arabi	2	0	2
(Iran) Esteghlal	4	0	4
(Thailand) Buriram United	2	0	2
(Uzbekistan) Bunyodkor	1	0	1
(South Korea) Jeonbuk Hyundai Motors	0	2	2
(Japan) Kashiwa Reysol	2	3	5
(Qatar) Al-Gharafa	1	0	1
(Saudi Arabia) Al-Shabab	2	3	5
(Australia) Central Coast Mariners	1	0	1
(China) Guangzhou Evergrande	2	3	5
(Saudi Arabia) Al-Hilal	0	2	2
(Qatar) Lekhwiya	1	2	3

Quarter-finals
(Saudi Arabia) Al-Ahli	1	0	1
(South Korea) FC Seoul	1	1	2
(Iran) Esteghlal	1	2	3
(Thailand) Buriram United	0	1	1
(Japan) Kashiwa Reysol (a)	1	2	3
(Saudi Arabia) Al-Shabab	1	2	3
(China) Guangzhou Evergrande	2	4	6
(Qatar) Lekhwiya	0	1	1

Semi-finals
(South Korea) FC Seoul	2	2	4
(Iran) Esteghlal	0	2	2
(Japan) Kashiwa Reysol	1	0	1
(China) Guangzhou Evergrande	4	4	8

Final
(South Korea) FC Seoul	2	1	3
(China) Guangzhou Evergrande (a)	2	1	3

== Round of 16 ==
The first legs were played on 14 and 15 May 2013, and the second legs were played on 21 and 22 May 2013.

West Zone
Team 1	Agg.	Team 2	1st leg	2nd leg
Al-Gharafa (Qatar)	1–5	(Saudi Arabia) Al-Shabab	1–2	0–3
El Jaish (Qatar)	1–3	(Saudi Arabia) Al-Ahli	1–1	0–2
Al-Hilal (Saudi Arabia)	2–3	(Qatar) Lekhwiya	0–1	2–2
Al-Shabab Al-Arabi (United Arab Emirates)	2–4	(Iran) Esteghlal	2–4	0–0

East Zone
Team 1	Agg.	Team 2	1st leg	2nd leg
Beijing Guoan (China)	1–3	(South Korea) FC Seoul	0–0	1–3
Buriram United (Thailand)	2−1	(Uzbekistan) Bunyodkor	2–1	0−0
Central Coast Mariners (Australia)	1–5	(China) Guangzhou Evergrande	1–2	0–3
Jeonbuk Hyundai Motors (South Korea)	2–5	(Japan) Kashiwa Reysol	0–2	2–3

=== First leg ===
14 May 2013
18:00 UTC+7

Buriram United (Thailand)	2–1	(Uzbekistan) Bunyodkor
Anawin 17'; Ekkachai 76'	Report	Taran 45+1'

New I-Mobile Stadium, Buriram
Attendance: 18,603
Referee: Ben Williams (Australia)

14 May 2013
19:30 UTC+8

Beijing Guoan (China)	0–0	(South Korea) FC Seoul
	Report

Workers Stadium, Beijing
Attendance: 36,458
Referee: Andre El Haddad (Lebanon)

14 May 2013
18:45 UTC+3

Al-Gharafa (Qatar)	1–2	(Saudi Arabia) Al-Shabab
Bresciano 42'	Report	Tagliabué 56'; Al-Shamrani 83'

Thani bin Jassim Stadium, Al Rayyan
Attendance: 4,212
Referee: Kim Jong-Hyeok (South Korea)

14 May 2013
19:00 UTC+3

El Jaish (Qatar)	1–1	(Saudi Arabia) Al-Ahli
Anderson 76'	Report	Al-Musa 45+1'

Abdullah bin Khalifa Stadium, Doha
Attendance: 8,291
Referee: Ali Abdulnabi (Bahrain)

15 May 2013
19:30 UTC+10

Central Coast Mariners (Australia)	1–2	(China) Guangzhou Evergrande
Duke 7'	Report	Barrios 28'; Muriqui 76'

Central Coast Stadium, Gosford
Attendance: 8,953
Referee: Abdul Malik Abdul Bashir (Singapore)

15 May 2013
19:00 UTC+9

Jeonbuk Hyundai Motors (South Korea)	0–2	(Japan) Kashiwa Reysol
	Report	Kudo 3'; Masushima 74'

Jeonju World Cup Stadium, Jeonju
Attendance: 9,431
Referee: Mohamed Al Zarouni (United Arab Emirates)

15 May 2013
19:40 UTC+4

Al-Shabab Al-Arabi (United Arab Emirates)	2–4	(Iran) Esteghlal
Luiz Henrique 45+2'; Edgar 85'	Report	Samuel 55'; Nekounam 72'; Majidi 80'; Heydari 89'

Maktoum Bin Rashid Al Maktoum Stadium, Dubai
Attendance: 6,375
Referee: Yuichi Nishimura (Japan)

15 May 2013
21:00 UTC+3

Al-Hilal (Saudi Arabia)	0–1	(Qatar) Lekhwiya
	Report	Msakni 81'

Prince Faisal bin Fahd Stadium, Riyadh
Attendance: 14,810
Referee: Kim Dong-Jin (South Korea)

=== Second leg ===
21 May 2013
19:30 UTC+9

FC Seoul (South Korea)	3–1	(China) Beijing Guoan
Adi 60'; Yun Il-Lok 70'; Koh Myong-Jin 90+4'	Report	Kanouté 9'

Seoul World Cup Stadium, Seoul
Attendance: 14,437
Referee: Mohsen Torky (Iran)

FC Seoul won 3–1 on aggregate.

21 May 2013
19:00 UTC+5

Bunyodkor (Uzbekistan)	0–0	(Thailand) Buriram United
	Report

Bunyodkor Stadium, Tashkent
Attendance: 11,672
Referee: Abdullah Balideh (Qatar)

Buriram United won 2–1 on aggregate.

21 May 2013
20:45 UTC+3

Al-Ahli (Saudi Arabia)	2–0	(Qatar) El Jaish
Bruno César 24'; Al-Bassas 37'	Report

King Abdul Aziz Stadium, Makkah
Attendance: 17,246
Referee: Valentin Kovalenko (Uzbekistan)

Al-Ahli won 3–1 on aggregate.

21 May 2013
20:50 UTC+3

Al-Shabab (Saudi Arabia)	3–0	(Qatar) Al-Gharafa
Tagliabué 35', 48'; Radeah 90+2'	Report

King Fahd International Stadium, Riyadh
Attendance: 4,716
Referee: Masaaki Toma (Japan)

Al-Shabab won 5–1 on aggregate.

22 May 2013
19:00 UTC+9

Kashiwa Reysol (Japan)	3–2	(South Korea) Jeonbuk Hyundai Motors
Watanabe 41'; Wagner 51'; Kudo 69'	Report	Masushima 21' (o.g.); Oris 86'

Hitachi Kashiwa Soccer Stadium, Kashiwa
Attendance: 8,897
Referee: Abdullah Al Hilali (Oman)

Kashiwa Reysol won 5–2 on aggregate.

22 May 2013
20:00 UTC+8

Guangzhou Evergrande (China)	3–0	(Australia) Central Coast Mariners
Muriqui 7'; Conca 45+1' (pen.); Gao Lin 68'	Report

Tianhe Stadium, Guangzhou
Attendance: 39,564
Referee: Abdulrahman Abdou (Qatar)

Guangzhou Evergrande won 5–1 on aggregate.

22 May 2013
18:30 UTC+3

Lekhwiya (Qatar)	2–2	(Saudi Arabia) Al-Hilal
Dia 14'; Musa 52'	Report	Al-Faraj 64'; Al-Shalhoub 78' (pen.)

Abdullah bin Khalifa Stadium, Doha
Attendance: 10,221
Referee: Peter Green (Australia)

Lekhwiya won 3–2 on aggregate.

22 May 2013
21:00 UTC+4:30

Esteghlal (Iran)	0–0	(United Arab Emirates) Al-Shabab Al-Arabi
	Report

Azadi Stadium, Tehran
Attendance: 25,700
Referee: Tan Hai (China PR)

Esteghlal won 4–2 on aggregate.

== Quarter-finals ==
The first legs were played on 21 August 2013, and the second legs were played on 18 September 2013.

Team 1	Agg.	Team 2	1st leg	2nd leg
Al-Ahli (Saudi Arabia)	1–2	(South Korea) FC Seoul	1–1	0–1
Esteghlal (Iran)	3–1	(Thailand) Buriram United	1–0	2–1
Kashiwa Reysol (Japan)	3–3 (a)	(Saudi Arabia) Al-Shabab	1–1	2–2
Guangzhou Evergrande (China)	6–1	(Qatar) Lekhwiya	2–0	4–1

=== First leg ===
21 August 2013
19:00 UTC+9

Kashiwa Reysol (Japan)	1–1	(Saudi Arabia) Al-Shabab
Kudo 21'	Report	Fernando 44'

Hitachi Kashiwa Soccer Stadium, Kashiwa
Attendance: 11,299
Referee: Kim Jong-Hyeok (South Korea)

21 August 2013
20:00 UTC+8

Guangzhou Evergrande (China)	2–0	(Qatar) Lekhwiya
Conca 73' (pen.); Elkeson 76'	Report

Tianhe Stadium, Guangzhou
Attendance: 52,384
Referee: Kim Dong-Jin (South Korea)

21 August 2013
20:15 UTC+4:30

Esteghlal (Iran)	1–0	(Thailand) Buriram United
Heydari 2'	Report

Azadi Stadium, Tehran
Attendance: 95,300
Referee: Abdulrahman Abdou (Qatar)

21 August 2013
21:00 UTC+3

Al-Ahli (Saudi Arabia)	1–1	(South Korea) FC Seoul
Al-Sawadi 81'	Report	Damjanović 10'

King Abdul Aziz Stadium, Makkah
Attendance: 25,012
Referee: Abdullah Balideh (Qatar)

=== Second leg ===
18 September 2013
19:30 UTC+9

FC Seoul (South Korea)	1–0	(Saudi Arabia) Al-Ahli
Damjanović 90'	Report

Seoul World Cup Stadium, Seoul
Attendance: 18,094
Referee: Masaaki Toma (Japan)

FC Seoul won 2–1 on aggregate.

18 September 2013
18:00 UTC+7

Buriram United (Thailand)	1–2	(Iran) Esteghlal
Osmar 38'	Report	Omranzadeh 53'; Teymourian 90+2'

New I-Mobile Stadium, Buriram
Attendance: 19,006
Referee: Ryuji Sato (Japan)

Esteghlal won 3–1 on aggregate.

18 September 2013
18:15 UTC+3

Lekhwiya (Qatar)	1–4	(China) Guangzhou Evergrande
Zhang Linpeng 51' (o.g.)	Report	Conca 14'; Elkeson 16', 77'; Muriqui 31'

Abdullah bin Khalifa Stadium, Doha
Attendance: 3,251
Referee: Mohamed Al Zarouni (United Arab Emirates)

Guangzhou Evergrande won 6–1 on aggregate.

18 September 2013
20:15 UTC+3

Al-Shabab (Saudi Arabia)	2–2	(Japan) Kashiwa Reysol
Hazazi 10'; Fallatah 85'	Report	Kwak Tae-Hwi 13' (o.g.); Kondo 73'

King Fahd International Stadium, Riyadh
Attendance: 6,830
Referee: Nawaf Shukralla (Bahrain)

3–3 on aggregate. Kashiwa Reysol won on away goals.

== Semi-finals ==
The first legs were played on 25 September 2013, and the second legs were played on 2 October 2013.

Team 1	Agg.	Team 2	1st leg	2nd leg
FC Seoul (South Korea)	4–2	(Iran) Esteghlal	2–0	2–2
Kashiwa Reysol (Japan)	1–8	(China) Guangzhou Evergrande	1–4	0–4

=== First leg ===
25 September 2013
19:00 UTC+9

Kashiwa Reysol (Japan)	1–4	(China) Guangzhou Evergrande
Wagner 10'	Report	Muriqui 58', 90+1'; Conca 67', 82'

Hitachi Kashiwa Soccer Stadium, Kashiwa
Attendance: 11,932
Referee: Valentin Kovalenko (Uzbekistan)

25 September 2013
19:30 UTC+9

FC Seoul (South Korea)	2–0	(Iran) Esteghlal
Damjanović 39'; Go Yo-Han 47'	Report

Seoul World Cup Stadium, Seoul
Attendance: 12,774
Referee: Ben Williams (Australia)

=== Second leg ===
2 October 2013
20:00 UTC+8

Guangzhou Evergrande (China)	4–0	(Japan) Kashiwa Reysol
Elkeson 16'; Conca 57'; Muriqui 79', 87'	Report

Tianhe Stadium, Guangzhou
Attendance: 41,000
Referee: Abdulrahman Abdou (Qatar)

Guangzhou Evergrande won 8–1 on aggregate.

2 October 2013
19:00 UTC+3:30

Esteghlal (Iran)	2–2	(South Korea) FC Seoul
Samuel 50'; Ghazi 75'	Report	Ha Dae-Sung 37'; Kim Jin-Kyu 80' (pen.)

Azadi Stadium, Tehran
Attendance: 88,330
Referee: Khalil Al Ghamdi (Saudi Arabia)

FC Seoul won 4–2 on aggregate.

== Final ==
The first leg was played on 26 October 2013, and the second leg was played on 9 November 2013.

Team 1	Agg.	Team 2	1st leg	2nd leg
FC Seoul (South Korea)	3–3 (a)	(China) Guangzhou Evergrande	2–2	1–1

26 October 2013
19:30 UTC+9

FC Seoul (South Korea)	2–2	(China) Guangzhou Evergrande
Escudero 11'; Damjanović 83'	Report	Elkeson 30'; Gao Lin 58'

Seoul World Cup Stadium, Seoul
Attendance: 55,501
Referee: Ravshan Irmatov (Uzbekistan)
9 November 2013
20:00 UTC+8

Guangzhou Evergrande (China)	1–1	(South Korea) FC Seoul
Elkeson 58'	Report	Damjanović 63'

Tianhe Stadium, Guangzhou
Attendance: 55,847
Referee: Nawaf Shukralla (Bahrain)

3–3 on aggregate. Guangzhou Evergrande won on away goals.
