= 2012 in Thai football =

Football in Thailand
- Season: 2012

2012 in Thai football involves the national competitions of the Thai football league system and the national team.

== Domestic leagues ==
=== Thai Premier League ===
Pos	Team	Pld	W	D	L	GF	GA	GD	Pts	Qualification or relegation
1	Muangthong United (C)	34	25	9	0	78	31	+47	84	2013 AFC Champions League Group stage
2	Chonburi	34	21	7	6	65	33	+32	70	
3	BEC Tero Sasana	34	16	9	9	53	43	+10	57	
4	Buriram United	34	14	12	8	60	40	+20	54	2013 AFC Champions League Qualifying play-off (Note: Buriram United qualified for the 2013 AFC Champions League as winners of the 2012 Thai FA Cup.)
5	Osotspa Saraburi	34	16	4	14	55	48	+7	52	
6	Esan United	34	11	14	9	41	42	−1	47	
7	Samut Songkhram	34	12	10	12	37	39	−2	46	
8	Bangkok Glass	34	10	15	9	53	39	+14	45	
9	Chiangrai United	34	11	11	12	40	47	−7	44	
10	Army United	34	10	13	11	34	38	−4	43	
11	Police United	34	10	12	12	37	38	−1	42	
12	TOT	34	10	12	12	43	46	−3	42	
13	Wuachon United	34	9	14	11	46	54	−8	41	
14	Chainat	34	9	12	13	59	72	−13	39	
15	Pattaya United	34	9	10	15	35	47	−12	37	
16	Thai Port (R)	34	8	9	17	32	48	−16	33	Relegation to the 2013 Thai Division 1 League
17	BBCU (R)	34	4	13	17	32	63	−31	25	Relegation to the 2013 Thai Division 1 League
18	TTM Chiangmai (R)	34	2	12	20	25	57	−32	18	Relegation to the 2013 Thai Division 1 League

Updated to match(es) played on 28 October 2012. Source: Thai Premier League
Rules for classification: 1st points; 2nd head-to-head (only match result, not used aggregate); 3rd match win; 4th goal difference; 5th goals scored.
(C) Champions; (R) Relegated

=== Division 1 League ===
Pos	Team	Pld	W	D	L	GF	GA	GD	Pts	Promotion or relegation
1	Ratchaburi (C, P)	34	24	6	4	85	31	+54	78	Promotion to 2013 Thai League 1
2	Suphanburi (P)	34	23	6	5	58	17	+41	75	Promotion to 2013 Thai League 1
3	Bangkok United (P)	34	23	5	6	57	29	+28	74	Promotion to 2013 Thai League 1
4	Sriracha	34	21	4	9	70	41	+29	67	
5	PTT Rayong	34	19	5	10	61	33	+28	62	
6	Krabi	34	17	6	11	49	28	+21	57	
7	Siam Navy	34	13	11	10	54	42	+12	50	
8	Nakhon Ratchasima	34	12	11	11	42	46	−4	47	
9	Air Force United	34	12	8	14	45	45	0	44	
10	Bangkok F.C.	34	11	9	14	62	56	+6	42	
11	Khonkaen	34	12	6	16	36	50	−14	42	
12	Saraburi	34	11	8	15	49	53	−4	41	
13	Phuket	34	10	10	14	41	47	−6	40	
14	Songkhla	34	9	10	15	38	51	−13	37	
15	Phattalung (R)	34	7	13	14	37	58	−21	34	Relegation to the 2013 Regional League Division 2
16	J.W. Rangsit (R)	34	8	7	19	36	65	−29	31	Relegation to the 2013 Regional League Division 2
17	Raj Pracha (R)	34	6	7	21	33	66	−33	25	Relegation to the 2013 Regional League Division 2
18	Chanthaburi (R)	34	0	4	30	21	115	−94	4	Relegation to the 2013 Regional League Division 2

Updated to match(es) played on 27 October 2012. Source: Thai Premier League
Rules for classification: 1st points; 2nd head-to-head (only match result, not used aggregate); 3rd match win; 4th goal difference; 5th goals scored.
(C) Champions; (P) Promoted; (R) Relegated
