= 2013 AFC Champions League qualifying play-off =

Asian club football tournament

The qualifying play-off of the 2013 AFC Champions League was played on 9 and 13 February 2013, to decide three of the 32 places in the group stage.

== Draw ==
The draw for the qualifying play-off was held on 6 December 2012, 16:00 UTC+8, at the AFC House in Kuala Lumpur, Malaysia.

The following six teams (four from West Zone, two from East Zone) were entered into the qualifying play-off draw:

West Zone

- (Iran) Saba Qom
- (United Arab Emirates) Al-Nasr
- (United Arab Emirates) Al-Shabab Al-Arabi
- (Uzbekistan) Lokomotiv Tashkent

East Zone

- (Australia) Brisbane Roar
- (Thailand) Buriram United

== Format ==
Each tie was played as a single match, with extra time and penalty shoot-out used to decide the winner if necessary. The winners of each tie advanced to the group stage to join the 29 automatic qualifiers.

== Matches ==
West Zone
Team 1	Score	Team 2
Saba Qom (Iran)	1–1 (a.e.t.) (3–5 p)	(United Arab Emirates) Al-Shabab Al-Arabi
Al-Nasr (United Arab Emirates)	3–2	(Uzbekistan) Lokomotiv Tashkent

East Zone
Team 1	Score	Team 2
Buriram United (Thailand)	0–0 (a.e.t.) (3–0 p)	(Australia) Brisbane Roar

Notes

1. Brisbane Roar was given home advantage in the original draw, but the match was later switched to be hosted by Buriram United per agreement between the two teams due to rescheduling of the match from the original date.

=== West Zone ===
9 February 2013
17:00 UTC+3:30

Qom (Iran)	1–1 (a.e.t.)	(United Arab Emirates) Al-Shabab Al-Arabi
Razaghirad 4'	Report	Dhahi 89'
Penalties
Bakhtiarizadeh (penalty scored); Eslami (penalty missed); Fallah (penalty scored); Rezaian (penalty scored)	3–5	(penalty scored) Edgar; (penalty scored) Ibrahim; (penalty scored) Ciel; (penalty scored) Masood; (penalty scored) Marzooq

Yadegar-e Emam Stadium, Qom
Attendance: 6,552
Referee: Abdul Malik Abdul Bashir (Singapore)

9 February 2013
20:00 UTC+4

Al-Nasr (United Arab Emirates)	3–2	(Uzbekistan) Lokomotiv Tashkent
Morimoto 30'; Fardan 78'; Léo Lima 89' (pen.)	Report	Karpenko 71'; Kholmatov 76'

Al-Maktoum Stadium, Dubai
Attendance: 3,825
Referee: Masaaki Toma (Japan)

=== East Zone ===
13 February 2013
18:00 UTC+7

Buriram United (Thailand)	0–0 (a.e.t.)	(Australia) Brisbane Roar
	Report
Penalties
Osmar (penalty scored); Chappuis (penalty scored); Jirawat (penalty scored)	3–0	(penalty missed) Broich; (penalty missed) Berisha; (penalty missed) Meyer

New I-Mobile Stadium, Buriram
Attendance: 14,482
Referee: Kim Dong-Jin (South Korea)
