= 2013 AFC Champions League group stage =

Football tournament group stage

The group stage of the 2013 AFC Champions League was played from 26 February to 1 May 2013. A total of 32 teams competed in the group stage.

== Draw ==
The draw for the group stage was held on 6 December 2012, 16:00 UTC+8, at the AFC House in Kuala Lumpur, Malaysia. The 32 teams were drawn into eight groups of four. Teams from the same association could not be drawn into the same group.

The following 32 teams (16 from West Zone, 16 from East Zone) were entered into the group-stage draw, which included the 29 automatic qualifiers and the three qualifying play-off winners, whose identity was not known at the time of the draw:

West Zone (Groups A–D)

- (Saudi Arabia) Al-Shabab
- (Saudi Arabia) Al-Ahli
- (Saudi Arabia) Al-Hilal
- (Saudi Arabia) Al-Ettifaq
- (Qatar) Lekhwiya
- (Qatar) Al-Gharafa
- (Qatar) El Jaish
- (Qatar) Al-Rayyan
- (Iran) Sepahan
- (Iran) Esteghlal
- (Iran) Tractor Sazi
- (United Arab Emirates) Al-Ain
- (United Arab Emirates) Al-Jazira
- (Uzbekistan) Pakhtakor
- Winner of play-off West 1: (United Arab Emirates) Al-Shabab Al-Arabi
- Winner of play-off West 2: (United Arab Emirates) Al-Nasr

East Zone (Groups E–H)

- (Japan) Sanfrecce Hiroshima
- (Japan) Kashiwa Reysol
- (Japan) Vegalta Sendai
- (Japan) Urawa Red Diamonds
- (South Korea) FC Seoul
- (South Korea) Pohang Steelers
- (South Korea) Jeonbuk Hyundai Motors
- (South Korea) Suwon Samsung Bluewings
- (China) Guangzhou Evergrande
- (China) Jiangsu Sainty
- (China) Beijing Guoan
- (China) Guizhou Renhe
- (Uzbekistan) Bunyodkor
- (Australia) Central Coast Mariners
- (Thailand) Muangthong United
- Winner of play-off East: (Thailand) Buriram United

== Format ==
In the group stage, each group was played on a home-and-away round-robin basis. The winners and runners-up of each group advanced to the round of 16.

=== Tiebreakers ===
The teams are ranked according to points (3 points for a win, 1 point for a tie, 0 points for a loss). If tied on points, tiebreakers are applied in the following order:

1. Greater number of points obtained in the group matches between the teams concerned
2. Goal difference resulting from the group matches between the teams concerned
3. Greater number of goals scored in the group matches between the teams concerned (away goals do not apply)
4. Goal difference in all the group matches
5. Greater number of goals scored in all the group matches
6. Penalty shoot-out if only two teams are involved and they are both on the field of play
7. Fewer score calculated according to the number of yellow and red cards received in the group matches (1 point for a single yellow card, 3 points for a red card as a consequence of two yellow cards, 3 points for a direct red card, 4 points for a yellow card followed by a direct red card)
8. Drawing of lots

== Groups ==
The matchdays were 26–27 February, 12–13 March, 2–3 April, 9–10 April, 23–24 April, and 30 April–1 May 2013.

=== Group A ===
Pos	Team	Pld	W	D	L	GF	GA	GD	Pts	Qualification	SHB	JSH	JAZ	TRA
1	(Saudi Arabia) Al-Shabab	6	4	1	1	7	5	+2	13	Advance to knockout stage	—	2–0	2–1	1–0
2	(Qatar) El Jaish	6	3	2	1	14	9	+5	11	Advance to knockout stage	3–0	—	3–1	3–3
3	(United Arab Emirates) Al-Jazira	6	1	2	3	7	10	−3	5		1–1	1–1	—	2–0
4	(Iran) Tractor Sazi	6	1	1	4	8	12	−4	4		0–1	2–4	3–1	—

26 February 2013
16:30 UTC+3:30

Tractor Sazi (Iran)	3–1	(United Arab Emirates) Al-Jazira
Seyed-Salehi 36'; Kazemian 60'; Ebrahimzadeh 80'	Report	Mabkhout 79'

Sahand Stadium, Tabriz
Attendance: 69,839
Referee: Tan Hai (China PR)
26 February 2013
20:25 UTC+3

Al-Shabab (Saudi Arabia)	2–0	(Qatar) El Jaish
Anderson 33' (o.g.); Al-Ghamdi 39'	Report

King Fahd International Stadium, Riyadh
Attendance: 7,361
Referee: Abdullah Al Hilali (Oman)

12 March 2013
18:30 UTC+3

El Jaish (Qatar)	3–3	(Iran) Tractor Sazi
Ribeiro 35', 88'; Adriano 67' (pen.)	Report	Paixão 24'; Seyed-Salehi 51'; Geílson 90+2'

Ahmed bin Ali Stadium, Al Rayyan
Attendance: 9,622
Referee: Yuichi Nishimura (Japan)
12 March 2013
19:30 UTC+4

Al-Jazira (United Arab Emirates)	1–1	(Saudi Arabia) Al-Shabab
Esmaeel 55'	Report	Fallatah 44'

Mohammed Bin Zayed Stadium, Abu Dhabi
Attendance: 13,450
Referee: Ravshan Irmatov (Uzbekistan)

2 April 2013
18:30 UTC+3

El Jaish (Qatar)	3–1	(United Arab Emirates) Al-Jazira
Ribeiro 7', 58'; Yousef 17'	Report	Khater 45+2'

Ahmed bin Ali Stadium, Al Rayyan
Attendance: 8,839
Referee: Andre El Haddad (Lebanon)
2 April 2013
20:05 UTC+3

Al-Shabab (Saudi Arabia)	1–0	(Iran) Tractor Sazi
Al-Shamrani 30'	Report

King Fahd International Stadium, Riyadh
Attendance: 3,785
Referee: Kim Dong-Jin (South Korea)

10 April 2013
19:40 UTC+4

Al-Jazira (United Arab Emirates)	1–1	(Qatar) El Jaish
Bargash 25'	Report	Adriano 33'

Mohammed Bin Zayed Stadium, Abu Dhabi
Attendance: 13,756
Referee: Lee Min-Hu (South Korea)
10 April 2013
20:15 UTC+4:30

Tractor Sazi (Iran)	0–1	(Saudi Arabia) Al-Shabab
	Report	Tagliabué 84'

Sahand Stadium, Tabriz
Attendance: 51,330
Referee: Valentin Kovalenko (Uzbekistan)

24 April 2013
18:30 UTC+3

El Jaish (Qatar)	3–0	(Saudi Arabia) Al-Shabab
Ribeiro 3', 82', 90+3'	Report

Ahmed bin Ali Stadium, Al Rayyan
Attendance: 8,112
Referee: Ryuji Sato (Japan)
24 April 2013
19:45 UTC+4

Al-Jazira (United Arab Emirates)	2–0	(Iran) Tractor Sazi
Oliveira 7'; Khater 90+2'	Report

Mohammed Bin Zayed Stadium, Abu Dhabi
Attendance: 13,246
Referee: Strebre Delovski (Australia)

1 May 2013
20:20 UTC+3

Al-Shabab (Saudi Arabia)	2–1	(United Arab Emirates) Al-Jazira
Al-Shamrani 47'; Al-Sulaitin 80'	Report	Diaky 30'

King Fahd International Stadium, Riyadh
Attendance: 3,436
Referee: Kim Sang-Woo (South Korea)
1 May 2013
21:50 UTC+4:30

Tractor Sazi (Iran)	2–4	(Qatar) El Jaish
Geílson 3', 66'	Report	Sayed 48' (pen.); Bakur 52', 71' (pen.); Go Seul-Ki 83'

Sahand Stadium, Tabriz
Attendance: 1,100
Referee: Kim Jong-Hyeok (South Korea)

=== Group B ===
Pos	Team	Pld	W	D	L	GF	GA	GD	Pts	Qualification	LEK	SHA	ETT	PAK
1	(Qatar) Lekhwiya	6	3	2	1	10	7	+3	11	Advance to knockout stage	—	2–1	2–0	3–1
2	(United Arab Emirates) Al-Shabab Al-Arabi	6	3	0	3	8	9	−1	9	Advance to knockout stage	3–1	—	1–0	0–1
3	(Saudi Arabia) Al-Ettifaq	6	2	1	3	6	5	+1	7		0–0	4–1	—	2–0
4	(Uzbekistan) Pakhtakor	6	2	1	3	6	9	−3	7		2–2	1–2	1–0	—

Tiebreakers

- Al-Ettifaq are ranked ahead of Pakhtakor on head-to-head record.
26 February 2013
16:00 UTC+5

Pakhtakor (Uzbekistan)	1–0	(Saudi Arabia) Al-Ettifaq
Abdukholiqov 73'	Report

Pakhtakor Markaziy Stadium, Tashkent
Attendance: 10,000
Referee: Kim Jong-Hyeok (South Korea)
26 February 2013
18:00 UTC+3

Lekhwiya (Qatar)	2–1	(United Arab Emirates) Al-Shabab Al-Arabi
Soria 20'; Msakni 33'	Report	Edgar 10'

Abdullah bin Khalifa Stadium, Doha
Attendance: 3,193
Referee: Andre El Haddad (Lebanon)

12 March 2013
19:15 UTC+4

Al-Shabab Al-Arabi (United Arab Emirates)	0–1	(Uzbekistan) Pakhtakor
	Report	Iskanderov 85'

Maktoum Bin Rashid Al Maktoum Stadium, Dubai
Attendance: 815
Referee: Ali Abdulnabi (Bahrain)
12 March 2013
19:45 UTC+3

Al-Ettifaq (Saudi Arabia)	0–0	(Qatar) Lekhwiya
	Report

Prince Mohamed bin Fahd Stadium, Dammam
Attendance: 2,471
Referee: Kim Dong-Jin (South Korea)

3 April 2013
18:15 UTC+3

Lekhwiya (Qatar)	3–1	(Uzbekistan) Pakhtakor
Dia 21'; Soria 84', 90+1'	Report	Urunov 40'

Abdullah bin Khalifa Stadium, Doha
Attendance: 3,414
Referee: Masaaki Toma (Japan)
3 April 2013
19:20 UTC+4

Al-Shabab Al-Arabi (United Arab Emirates)	1–0	(Saudi Arabia) Al-Ettifaq
Masood 81'	Report

Maktoum Bin Rashid Al Maktoum Stadium, Dubai
Attendance: 600
Referee: Minoru Tōjō (Japan)

9 April 2013
16:00 UTC+5

Pakhtakor (Uzbekistan)	2–2	(Qatar) Lekhwiya
Urunov 26'; Traoré 56' (o.g.)	Report	Soria 1'; Msakni 67'

Pakhtakor Markaziy Stadium, Tashkent
Attendance: 8,900
Referee: Tan Hai (China PR)
9 April 2013
20:00 UTC+3

Al-Ettifaq (Saudi Arabia)	4–1	(United Arab Emirates) Al-Shabab Al-Arabi
Bashir 16', 71'; Al-Shehri 42'; Al-Salem 80'	Report	Edgar 51'

Prince Mohamed bin Fahd Stadium, Dammam
Attendance: 430
Referee: Abdullah Al Hilali (Oman)

24 April 2013
19:30 UTC+4

Al-Shabab Al-Arabi (United Arab Emirates)	3–1	(Qatar) Lekhwiya
Obaid 46'; Ciel 76'; Edgar 90+2'	Report	Msakni 36'

Maktoum Bin Rashid Al Maktoum Stadium, Dubai
Attendance: 934
Referee: Lee Min-Hu (South Korea)
24 April 2013
20:10 UTC+3

Al-Ettifaq (Saudi Arabia)	2–0	(Uzbekistan) Pakhtakor
Al-Shehri 24'; Al-Jamaan 41'	Report

Prince Mohamed bin Fahd Stadium, Dammam
Attendance: 883
Referee: Hiroyoshi Takayama (Japan)

1 May 2013
19:00 UTC+3

Lekhwiya (Qatar)	2–0	(Saudi Arabia) Al-Ettifaq
Luiz Jr. 12'; Muftah 65'	Report

Abdullah bin Khalifa Stadium, Doha
Attendance: 2,114
Referee: Ali Abdulnabi (Bahrain)
1 May 2013
21:00 UTC+5

Pakhtakor (Uzbekistan)	1–2	(United Arab Emirates) Al-Shabab Al-Arabi
Makharadze 19' (pen.)	Report	Dhahi 1'; Makharadze 64' (o.g.)

Pakhtakor Markaziy Stadium, Tashkent
Attendance: 8,556
Referee: Mohsen Torky (Iran)

=== Group C ===
Pos	Team	Pld	W	D	L	GF	GA	GD	Pts	Qualification	AHL	GHA	SEP	NAS
1	(Saudi Arabia) Al-Ahli	6	4	2	0	16	8	+8	14	Advance to knockout stage	—	2–0	4–1	2–2
2	(Qatar) Al-Gharafa	6	3	1	2	13	11	+2	10	Advance to knockout stage	2–2	—	3–1	3–1
3	(Iran) Sepahan	6	3	0	3	12	13	−1	9		2–4	3–1	—	3–0
4	(United Arab Emirates) Al-Nasr	6	0	1	5	7	16	−9	1		1–2	2–4	1–2	—

27 February 2013
19:30 UTC+3:30

Sepahan (Iran)	3–0	(United Arab Emirates) Al-Nasr
Sukaj 22', 81'; Ebrahimi 87'	Report

Foolad Shahr Stadium, Fuladshahr
Attendance: 5,700
Referee: Yuichi Nishimura (Japan)
27 February 2013
20:30 UTC+3

Al-Ahli (Saudi Arabia)	2–0	(Qatar) Al-Gharafa
Al-Bassas 35'; Victor Simões 90+4'	Report

King Abdul Aziz Stadium, Makkah
Attendance: 9,556
Referee: Ryuji Sato (Japan)

13 March 2013
18:15 UTC+3

Al-Gharafa (Qatar)	3–1	(Iran) Sepahan
Cissé 16', 58'; Siddiq 90+2'	Report	Ahmadi 13'

Thani bin Jassim Stadium, Al Rayyan
Attendance: 5,685
Referee: Lee Min-Hu (South Korea)
13 March 2013
20:00 UTC+4

Al-Nasr (United Arab Emirates)	1–2	(Saudi Arabia) Al-Ahli
Morimoto 13'	Report	Al Hosni 17', 36'

Al-Maktoum Stadium, Dubai
Attendance: 4,714
Referee: Kim Jong-Hyeok (South Korea)

2 April 2013
20:00 UTC+4

Al-Nasr (United Arab Emirates)	2–4	(Qatar) Al-Gharafa
Fardan 56'; Correa 58'	Report	Cissé 24'; Shami 31'; Nenê 45+1' (pen.); Quaye 84'

Al-Maktoum Stadium, Dubai
Attendance: 5,132
Referee: Ben Williams (Australia)
2 April 2013
20:30 UTC+4:30

Sepahan (Iran)	2–4	(Saudi Arabia) Al-Ahli
Sukaj 3'; Talebi 86'	Report	Victor Simões 23', 65'; Bruno César 39'; Al Hosni 46'

Foolad Shahr Stadium, Fuladshahr
Attendance: 9,124
Referee: Vladislav Tseytlin (Uzbekistan)

10 April 2013
18:30 UTC+3

Al-Gharafa (Qatar)	3–1	(United Arab Emirates) Al-Nasr
Quaye 8'; Nenê 55'; Al Shammari 79'	Report	Morimoto 16'

Thani bin Jassim Stadium, Al Rayyan
Attendance: 5,121
Referee: Ali Abdulnabi (Bahrain)
10 April 2013
20:45 UTC+3

Al-Ahli (Saudi Arabia)	4–1	(Iran) Sepahan
Al-Bassas 44', 62'; Bruno César 68' (pen.); Al-Khamees 90+1'	Report	Đalović 82'

King Abdul Aziz Stadium, Makkah
Attendance: 11,158
Referee: Strebre Delovski (Australia)

23 April 2013
18:30 UTC+3

Al-Gharafa (Qatar)	2–2	(Saudi Arabia) Al-Ahli
Alex 24'; Cissé 54' (pen.)	Report	Al Hosni 31'; Palomino 68'

Thani bin Jassim Stadium, Al Rayyan
Attendance: 4,551
Referee: Valentin Kovalenko (Uzbekistan)
23 April 2013
20:00 UTC+4

Al-Nasr (United Arab Emirates)	1–2	(Iran) Sepahan
Taher 71'	Report	Đalović 29'; Gholami 79'

Al-Maktoum Stadium, Dubai
Attendance: 400
Referee: Abdullah Al Hilali (Oman)

30 April 2013
20:30 UTC+4:30

Sepahan (Iran)	3–1	(Qatar) Al-Gharafa
Jahan Alian 11'; Gholami 48'; Khalatbari 55'	Report	Siddiq 44'

Foolad Shahr Stadium, Fuladshahr
Attendance: 1,200
Referee: Jumpei Iida (Japan)
30 April 2013
21:00 UTC+3

Al-Ahli (Saudi Arabia)	2–2	(United Arab Emirates) Al-Nasr
Bakshween 8' (pen.); Al-Jassim 77'	Report	Léo Lima 23' (pen.); Malullah 55'

King Abdul Aziz Stadium, Makkah
Attendance: 1,730
Referee: Tan Hai (China PR)

=== Group D ===
Pos	Team	Pld	W	D	L	GF	GA	GD	Pts	Qualification	EST	HIL	AIN	RAY
1	(Iran) Esteghlal	6	4	1	1	11	5	+6	13	Advance to knockout stage	—	0–1	2–0	3–0
2	(Saudi Arabia) Al-Hilal	6	4	0	2	10	6	+4	12	Advance to knockout stage	1–2	—	2–0	3–1
3	(United Arab Emirates) Al-Ain	6	2	0	4	6	9	−3	6		0–1	3–1	—	2–1
4	(Qatar) Al-Rayyan	6	1	1	4	7	14	−7	4		3–3	0–2	2–1	—

Source: ScoresPro
27 February 2013
19:15 UTC+4

Al-Ain (United Arab Emirates)	3–1	(Saudi Arabia) Al-Hilal
Abdulrahman 27'; Brosque 46'; Gyan 90+2'	Report	Al-Zori 9'

Tahnoun bin Mohammed Stadium, Al Ain
Attendance: 8,819
Referee: Peter Green (Australia)
27 February 2013
18:20 UTC+3

Al-Rayyan (Qatar)	3–3	(Iran) Esteghlal
Tabata 37' (pen.); Omranzadeh 58' (o.g.); Nilmar 87'	Report	Samuel 27'; Borhani 45+1'; Nekounam 86' (pen.)

Ahmed bin Ali Stadium, Al Rayyan
Attendance: 5,026
Referee: Ben Williams (Australia)

13 March 2013
19:00 UTC+3:30

Esteghlal (Iran)	2–0	(United Arab Emirates) Al-Ain
Samuel 64'; Majidi 73'	Report

Azadi Stadium, Tehran
Attendance: 21,330
Referee: Valentin Kovalenko (Uzbekistan)
13 March 2013
20:35 UTC+3

Al-Hilal (Saudi Arabia)	3–1	(Qatar) Al-Rayyan
Al-Qahtani 57', 74'; Al-Shalhoub 88'	Report	Ismail 86'

Prince Faisal bin Fahd Stadium, Riyadh
Attendance: 11,090
Referee: Abdullah Al Hilali (Oman)

3 April 2013
19:30 UTC+4

Al-Ain (United Arab Emirates)	2–1	(Qatar) Al-Rayyan
Ekoko 34'; Brosque 70'	Report	Nilmar 32'

Tahnoun bin Mohammed Stadium, Al Ain
Attendance: 8,102
Referee: Ryuji Sato (Japan)
3 April 2013
20:40 UTC+3

Al-Hilal (Saudi Arabia)	1–2	(Iran) Esteghlal
Al-Dossari 68'	Report	Montazeri 80'; Borhani 86'

Prince Faisal bin Fahd Stadium, Riyadh
Attendance: 11,475
Referee: Nawaf Shukralla (Bahrain)

9 April 2013
18:40 UTC+3

Al-Rayyan (Qatar)	2–1	(United Arab Emirates) Al-Ain
Nilmar 59'; Al-Marri 86'	Report	Ahmed 78'

Ahmed bin Ali Stadium, Al Rayyan
Attendance: 2,000
Referee: Kim Jong-Hyeok (South Korea)
9 April 2013
21:00 UTC+4:30

Esteghlal (Iran)	0–1	(Saudi Arabia) Al-Hilal
	Report	Al Abed 35'

Azadi Stadium, Tehran
Attendance: 80,300
Referee: Abdul Malik Abdul Bashir (Singapore)

23 April 2013
21:00 UTC+4:30

Esteghlal (Iran)	3–0	(Qatar) Al-Rayyan
Majidi 45'; Beikzadeh 73'; Borhani 90+1'	Report

Azadi Stadium, Tehran
Attendance: 28,330
Referee: Andre El Haddad (Lebanon)
23 April 2013
20:50 UTC+3

Al-Hilal (Saudi Arabia)	2–0	(United Arab Emirates) Al-Ain
Al-Dossari 4'; Wesley 24'	Report

Prince Faisal bin Fahd Stadium, Riyadh
Attendance: 13,067
Referee: Vladislav Tseytlin (Uzbekistan)

30 April 2013
19:50 UTC+4

Al-Ain (United Arab Emirates)	0–1	(Iran) Esteghlal
	Report	Nekounam 80' (pen.)

Tahnoun bin Mohammed Stadium, Al Ain
Attendance: 4,173
Referee: Masaaki Toma (Japan)
30 April 2013
18:50 UTC+3

Al-Rayyan (Qatar)	0–2	(Saudi Arabia) Al-Hilal
	Report	Al Abed 78'; Al-Harthi 83'

Ahmed bin Ali Stadium, Al Rayyan
Attendance: 5,563
Referee: Minoru Tōjō (Japan)

=== Group E ===
Pos	Team	Pld	W	D	L	GF	GA	GD	Pts	Qualification	SEO	BUR	JIA	SEN
1	(South Korea) FC Seoul	6	3	2	1	11	5	+6	11	Advance to knockout stage	—	2–2	5–1	2–1
2	(Thailand) Buriram United	6	1	4	1	6	6	0	7	Advance to knockout stage	0–0	—	2–0	1–1
3	(China) Jiangsu Sainty	6	2	1	3	5	10	−5	7		0–2	2–0	—	0–0
4	(Japan) Vegalta Sendai	6	1	3	2	5	6	−1	6		1–0	1–1	1–2	—

Tiebreakers

- Buriram United and Jiangsu Sainty are tied on head-to-head record, and so are ranked by overall goal difference.
26 February 2013
19:00 UTC+9

Vegalta Sendai (Japan)	1–1	(Thailand) Buriram United
Ryang Yong-Gi 53' (pen.)	Report	Osmar 76'

Yurtec Stadium Sendai, Sendai
Attendance: 10,206
Referee: Liu Kwok Man (Hong Kong)
26 February 2013
19:30 UTC+9

FC Seoul (South Korea)	5–1	(China) Jiangsu Sainty
Damjanović 8', 61'; Yun Il-Lok 33', 56'; Molina 87'	Report	Salihi 80'

Seoul World Cup Stadium, Seoul
Attendance: 6,231
Referee: Mohsen Torky (Iran)

12 March 2013
18:00 UTC+7

Buriram United (Thailand)	0–0	(South Korea) FC Seoul
	Report

New I-Mobile Stadium, Buriram
Attendance: 20,271
Referee: Abdul Malik Abdul Bashir (Singapore)
12 March 2013
19:40 UTC+8

Jiangsu Sainty (China)	0–0	(Japan) Vegalta Sendai
	Report

Nanjing Olympic Sports Center, Nanjing
Attendance: 44,785
Referee: Abdullah Balideh (Qatar)

2 April 2013
19:30 UTC+9

FC Seoul (South Korea)	2–1	(Japan) Vegalta Sendai
Escudero 6'; Kim Jin-Kyu 22'	Report	Wilson 87' (pen.)

Seoul World Cup Stadium, Seoul
Attendance: 9,762
Referee: Valentin Kovalenko (Uzbekistan)
2 April 2013
19:40 UTC+8

Jiangsu Sainty (China)	2–0	(Thailand) Buriram United
Lu Bofei 42'; Sun Ke 43'	Report

Nanjing Olympic Sports Center, Nanjing
Attendance: 35,756
Referee: Ali Al-Badwawi (United Arab Emirates)

10 April 2013
19:00 UTC+9

Vegalta Sendai (Japan)	1–0	(South Korea) FC Seoul
Yanagisawa 16'	Report

Yurtec Stadium Sendai, Sendai
Attendance: 8,874
Referee: Mohamed Al Zarouni (United Arab Emirates)
10 April 2013
18:00 UTC+7

Buriram United (Thailand)	2–0	(China) Jiangsu Sainty
Suchao 39'; Charyl 60'	Report

New I-Mobile Stadium, Buriram
Attendance: 18,083
Referee: Abdulrahman Abdou (Qatar)

24 April 2013
18:00 UTC+7

Buriram United (Thailand)	1–1	(Japan) Vegalta Sendai
Osmar 53'	Report	Nakahara 90+3'

New I-Mobile Stadium, Buriram
Attendance: 19,237
Referee: Ali Abdulnabi (Bahrain)
24 April 2013
19:40 UTC+8

Jiangsu Sainty (China)	0–2	(South Korea) FC Seoul
	Report	Koh Myong-Jin 32'; Yun Il-Lok 72'

Nanjing Olympic Sports Center, Nanjing
Attendance: 33,587
Referee: Abdul Malik Abdul Bashir (Singapore)

1 May 2013
19:30 UTC+9

FC Seoul (South Korea)	2–2	(Thailand) Buriram United
Jung Seung-Yong 55'; Kim Hyun-Sung 74'	Report	Ekkachai 56'; Theeraton 75'

Seoul World Cup Stadium, Seoul
Attendance: 7,561
Referee: Alireza Faghani (Iran)
1 May 2013
19:30 UTC+9

Vegalta Sendai (Japan)	1–2	(China) Jiangsu Sainty
Sugai 24'	Report	Liu Jianye 38'; Salihi 62'

Yurtec Stadium Sendai, Sendai
Attendance: 11,241
Referee: Ravshan Irmatov (Uzbekistan)

=== Group F ===
Pos	Team	Pld	W	D	L	GF	GA	GD	Pts	Qualification	GUA	JEO	URA	MUA
1	(China) Guangzhou Evergrande	6	3	2	1	14	5	+9	11	Advance to knockout stage	—	0–0	3–0	4–0
2	(South Korea) Jeonbuk Hyundai Motors	6	2	4	0	10	6	+4	10	Advance to knockout stage	1–1	—	2–2	2–0
3	(Japan) Urawa Red Diamonds	6	3	1	2	11	11	0	10		3–2	1–3	—	4–1
4	(Thailand) Muangthong United	6	0	1	5	4	17	−13	1		1–4	2–2	0–1	—

Tiebreakers

- Jeonbuk Hyundai Motors are ranked ahead of Urawa Red Diamonds on head-to-head record.
26 February 2013
20:00 UTC+8

Guangzhou Evergrande (China)	3–0	(Japan) Urawa Red Diamonds
Barrios 16'; Muriqui 65'; Suzuki 90+1' (o.g.)	Report

Tianhe Stadium, Guangzhou
Attendance: 39,876
Referee: Banjar Al-Dosari (Qatar)
26 February 2013
19:00 UTC+7

Muangthong United (Thailand)	2–2	(South Korea) Jeonbuk Hyundai Motors
Gjurovski 45+1' (pen.); Kim Yoo-Jin 89'	Report	Lee Dong-Gook 6' (pen.); Oris 78'

SCG Stadium, Nonthaburi
Attendance: 10,317
Referee: Alireza Faghani (Iran)

12 March 2013
19:00 UTC+9

Jeonbuk Hyundai Motors (South Korea)	1–1	(China) Guangzhou Evergrande
Kim Jung-Woo 28'	Report	Muriqui 64'

Jeonju World Cup Stadium, Jeonju
Attendance: 10,949
Referee: Nawaf Shukralla (Bahrain)
12 March 2013
19:30 UTC+9

Urawa Red Diamonds (Japan)	4–1	(Thailand) Muangthong United
Kashiwagi 8'; Sekiguchi 65'; Haraguchi 69'; Thritthi 78' (o.g.)	Report	Siaka 90'

Saitama Stadium 2002, Saitama
Attendance: 23,246
Referee: Ben Williams (Australia)

3 April 2013
19:30 UTC+9

Urawa Red Diamonds (Japan)	1–3	(South Korea) Jeonbuk Hyundai Motors
Haraguchi 6'	Report	Lee Seung-Gi 52'; Lee Dong-Gook 64'; Eninho 70'

Saitama Stadium 2002, Saitama
Attendance: 22,005
Referee: Khalil Al Ghamdi (Saudi Arabia)
3 April 2013
20:00 UTC+8

Guangzhou Evergrande (China)	4–0	(Thailand) Muangthong United
Conca 51', 90+2' (pen.); Muriqui 58'; Gao Lin 84'	Report

Tianhe Stadium, Guangzhou
Attendance: 39,841
Referee: Abdullah Al Hilali (Oman)

9 April 2013
19:00 UTC+9

Jeonbuk Hyundai Motors (South Korea)	2–2	(Japan) Urawa Red Diamonds
Eninho 51'; Seo Sang-Min 90+2'	Report	Nasu 3'; Umesaki 7'

Jeonju World Cup Stadium, Jeonju
Attendance: 10,152
Referee: Vladislav Tseytlin (Uzbekistan)
9 April 2013
19:00 UTC+7

Muangthong United (Thailand)	1–4	(China) Guangzhou Evergrande
Sarawut 53'	Report	Muriqui 40', 43'; Zheng Zhi 56'; Feng Xiaoting 86'

SCG Stadium, Nonthaburi
Attendance: 10,207
Referee: Andre El Haddad (Lebanon)

24 April 2013
19:00 UTC+9

Jeonbuk Hyundai Motors (South Korea)	2–0	(Thailand) Muangthong United
Lee Dong-Gook 56' (pen.); Park Hee-Do 58'	Report

Jeonju World Cup Stadium, Jeonju
Attendance: 4,493
Referee: Abdullah Balideh (Qatar)
24 April 2013
19:30 UTC+9

Urawa Red Diamonds (Japan)	3–2	(China) Guangzhou Evergrande
Koroki 52'; Abe 63'; Márcio Richardes 67' (pen.)	Report	Barrios 37'; Muriqui 87'

Saitama Stadium 2002, Saitama
Attendance: 19,687
Referee: Mohsen Torky (Iran)

1 May 2013
20:00 UTC+8

Guangzhou Evergrande (China)	0–0	(South Korea) Jeonbuk Hyundai Motors
	Report

Tianhe Stadium, Guangzhou
Attendance: 40,000
Referee: Khalil Al Ghamdi (Saudi Arabia)
1 May 2013
19:00 UTC+7

Muangthong United (Thailand)	0–1	(Japan) Urawa Red Diamonds
	Report	Nasu 48'

SCG Stadium, Nonthaburi
Attendance: 7,348
Referee: Abdulla Hassan Mohamed (United Arab Emirates)

=== Group G ===
Pos	Team	Pld	W	D	L	GF	GA	GD	Pts	Qualification	BUN	BEI	POH	HIR
1	(Uzbekistan) Bunyodkor	6	2	4	0	6	3	+3	10	Advance to knockout stage	—	0–0	2–2	0–0
2	(China) Beijing Guoan	6	2	3	1	4	2	+2	9	Advance to knockout stage	0–1	—	2–0	2–1
3	(South Korea) Pohang Steelers	6	1	4	1	5	6	−1	7		1–1	0–0	—	1–1
4	(Japan) Sanfrecce Hiroshima	6	0	3	3	2	6	−4	3		0–2	0–0	0–1	—

27 February 2013
19:00 UTC+9

Sanfrecce Hiroshima (Japan)	0–2	(Uzbekistan) Bunyodkor
	Report	Pyschur 45'; Musaev 86'

Hiroshima Big Arch, Hiroshima
Attendance: 6,607
Referee: Mohamed Al Zarouni (United Arab Emirates)
27 February 2013
19:30 UTC+9

Pohang Steelers (South Korea)	0–0	(China) Beijing Guoan
	Report

Pohang Steel Yard, Pohang
Attendance: 6,832
Referee: Abdullah Balideh (Qatar)

13 March 2013
19:30 UTC+8

Beijing Guoan (China)	2–1	(Japan) Sanfrecce Hiroshima
Lang Zheng 21'; Piao Cheng 79'	Report	Ishihara 75'

Workers Stadium, Beijing
Attendance: 29,616
Referee: Saeid Mozaffarizadeh (Iran)
13 March 2013
17:00 UTC+5

Bunyodkor (Uzbekistan)	2–2	(South Korea) Pohang Steelers
Pyschur 15'; Murzoev 90+4'	Report	Lee Myung-Joo 60'; Lee Gwang-Hoon 67'

JAR Stadium, Tashkent
Attendance: 5,000
Referee: Alireza Faghani (Iran)

2 April 2013
19:00 UTC+9

Sanfrecce Hiroshima (Japan)	0–1	(South Korea) Pohang Steelers
	Report	Bae Chun-Suk 18'

Hiroshima Big Arch, Hiroshima
Attendance: 5,365
Referee: Marai Al Awaji (Saudi Arabia)
2 April 2013
17:00 UTC+5

Bunyodkor (Uzbekistan)	0–0	(China) Beijing Guoan
	Report

Bunyodkor Stadium, Tashkent
Attendance: 7,520
Referee: Ali Abdulnabi (Bahrain)

10 April 2013
19:30 UTC+9

Pohang Steelers (South Korea)	1–1	(Japan) Sanfrecce Hiroshima
Hwang Jin-Sung 67'	Report	Ishihara 62'

Pohang Steel Yard, Pohang
Attendance: 5,882
Referee: Nagor Amir Noor Mohamed (Malaysia)
10 April 2013
19:30 UTC+8

Beijing Guoan (China)	0–1	(Uzbekistan) Bunyodkor
	Report	Musaev 32'

Workers Stadium, Beijing
Attendance: 37,811
Referee: Marai Al Awaji (Saudi Arabia)

23 April 2013
19:30 UTC+8

Beijing Guoan (China)	2–0	(South Korea) Pohang Steelers
Guerrón 47'; Shao Jiayi 87'	Report

Workers Stadium, Beijing
Attendance: 33,205
Referee: Mohamed Al Zarouni (United Arab Emirates)
23 April 2013
18:00 UTC+5

Bunyodkor (Uzbekistan)	0–0	(Japan) Sanfrecce Hiroshima
	Report

Bunyodkor Stadium, Tashkent
Attendance: 8,448
Referee: Abdulla Hassan Mohamed (United Arab Emirates)

30 April 2013
19:00 UTC+9

Sanfrecce Hiroshima (Japan)	0–0	(China) Beijing Guoan
	Report

Hiroshima Big Arch, Hiroshima
Attendance: 5,719
Referee: Abdulrahman Abdou (Qatar)
30 April 2013
19:00 UTC+9

Pohang Steelers (South Korea)	1–1	(Uzbekistan) Bunyodkor
Park Sung-Ho 90+3'	Report	Pyschur 79'

Pohang Steel Yard, Pohang
Attendance: 7,357
Referee: Banjar Al-Dosari (Qatar)

=== Group H ===
Pos	Team	Pld	W	D	L	GF	GA	GD	Pts	Qualification	KSW	CCM	GUI	SUW
1	(Japan) Kashiwa Reysol	6	4	2	0	14	4	+10	14	Advance to knockout stage	—	3–1	1–1	0–0
2	(Australia) Central Coast Mariners	6	2	1	3	5	9	−4	7	Advance to knockout stage	0–3	—	2–1	0–0
3	(China) Guizhou Renhe	6	1	3	2	6	7	−1	6		0–1	2–1	—	2–2
4	(South Korea) Suwon Samsung Bluewings	6	0	4	2	4	9	−5	4		2–6	0–1	0–0	—

27 February 2013
19:00 UTC+11

Central Coast Mariners (Australia)	0–0	(South Korea) Suwon Samsung Bluewings
	Report

Central Coast Stadium, Gosford
Attendance: 4,529
Referee: Ali Abdulnabi (Bahrain)
27 February 2013
19:30 UTC+8

Guizhou Renhe (China)	0–1	(Japan) Kashiwa Reysol
	Report	Cléo 45+1'

Guiyang Olympic Sports Center, Guiyang
Attendance: 28,411
Referee: Khalil Al Ghamdi (Saudi Arabia)

13 March 2013
19:00 UTC+9

Kashiwa Reysol (Japan)	3–1	(Australia) Central Coast Mariners
Leandro Domingues 21', 88'; Kano 67'	Report	Zwaanswijk 8'

Hitachi Kashiwa Soccer Stadium, Kashiwa
Attendance: 6,472
Referee: Ali Al-Badwawi (United Arab Emirates)
13 March 2013
19:30 UTC+9

Suwon Samsung Bluewings (South Korea)	0–0	(China) Guizhou Renhe
	Report

Suwon World Cup Stadium, Suwon
Attendance: 5,553
Referee: Mohamed Al Zarouni (United Arab Emirates)

3 April 2013
19:00 UTC+11

Central Coast Mariners (Australia)	2–1	(China) Guizhou Renhe
Bojić 50'; Sainsbury 80'	Report	Rose 71' (o.g.)

Central Coast Stadium, Gosford
Attendance: 3,518
Referee: Abdullah Balideh (Qatar)
3 April 2013
19:30 UTC+9

Suwon Samsung Bluewings (South Korea)	2–6	(Japan) Kashiwa Reysol
Choi Jae-Soo 52'; Ristić 73' (pen.)	Report	Tanaka 16', 67'; Kurisawa 51', 75'; Kudo 55', 90+3'

Suwon World Cup Stadium, Suwon
Attendance: 7,845
Referee: Mohsen Torky (Iran)

9 April 2013
19:00 UTC+9

Kashiwa Reysol (Japan)	0–0	(South Korea) Suwon Samsung Bluewings
	Report

Hitachi Kashiwa Soccer Stadium, Kashiwa
Attendance: 7,269
Referee: Banjar Al-Dosari (Qatar)
9 April 2013
19:30 UTC+8

Guizhou Renhe (China)	2–1	(Australia) Central Coast Mariners
Muslimović 83'; Qu Bo 85'	Report	Duke 42' (pen.)

Guiyang Olympic Sports Center, Guiyang
Attendance: 18,988
Referee: Abdulla Hassan Mohamed (United Arab Emirates)

23 April 2013
19:00 UTC+9

Kashiwa Reysol (Japan)	1–1	(China) Guizhou Renhe
Masushima 51'	Report	Li Kai 85'

Hitachi Kashiwa Soccer Stadium, Kashiwa
Attendance: 6,083
Referee: Saeid Mozaffarizadeh (Iran)
23 April 2013
19:30 UTC+9

Suwon Samsung Bluewings (South Korea)	0–1	(Australia) Central Coast Mariners
	Report	McGlinchey 80'

Suwon World Cup Stadium, Suwon
Attendance: 3,120
Referee: Marai Al Awaji (Saudi Arabia)

30 April 2013
20:30 UTC+10

Central Coast Mariners (Australia)	0–3	(Japan) Kashiwa Reysol
	Report	Kudo 59'; Cléo 79'; Leandro Domingues 85'

Central Coast Stadium, Gosford
Attendance: 7,623
Referee: Valentin Kovalenko (Uzbekistan)
30 April 2013
18:30 UTC+8

Guizhou Renhe (China)	2–2	(South Korea) Suwon Samsung Bluewings
Sun Jihai 45'; Zhang Chenglin 86'	Report	Lee Jong-Min 35'; Kwon Chang-Hoon 55'

Guiyang Olympic Sports Center, Guiyang
Attendance: 28,000
Referee: Nawaf Shukralla (Bahrain)
