= Luiz Guilherme =

Brazilian footballer

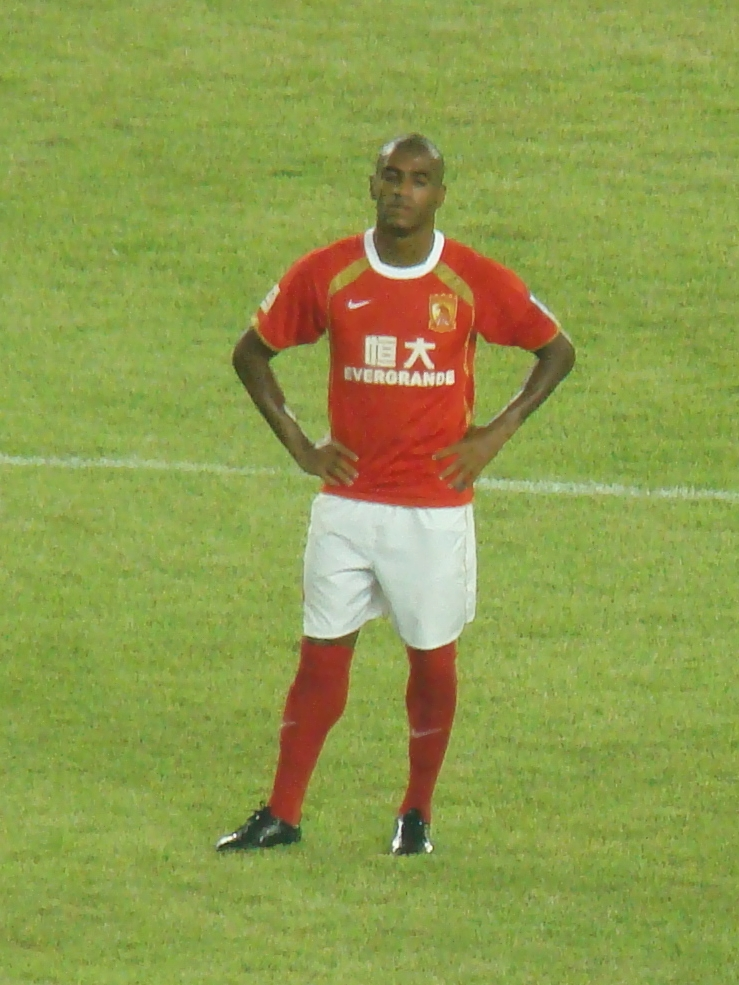
- Luiz Guilherme with Guangzhou Evergrande in 2011

Personal information
- Full name: Luiz Guilherme da Conceição Silva
- Date of birth: 16 June 1986 (age 40)
- Place of birth: Mangaratiba, Rio de Janeiro, Brazil
- Height: 1.71 m (5 ft 7 in)
- Positions: Second striker; winger

Youth career
- 2001–2003: Madureira

Senior career*
Years	Team	Apps	(Gls)
2004–2008	Madureira	0	(0)
2004–2005	→ Vasco da Gama (loan)	15	(3)
2006	→ Paysandu (loan)	12	(1)
2006	→ Iraty (loan)	0	(0)
2007	→ Avaí FC (loan)	20	(5)
2008–2010	Desportivo Brasil	0	(0)
2008	→ Vitória (loan)	12	(0)
2009	→ Ituano (loan)	0	(0)
2009	→ Avaí FC (loan)	31	(9)
2010	→ Atlético Mineiro (loan)	7	(4)
2010–2014	Guangzhou Evergrande	117	(61)
2014–2016	Al Sadd	23	(15)
2016	→ FC Tokyo (loan)	20	(4)
2016	→ FC Tokyo U-23 (loan)	3	(1)
2017	Vasco da Gama	2	(0)
2017	Guangzhou Evergrande	13	(6)
2018	Meizhou Meixian Techand	20	(16)
2019–2021	Cangzhou Mighty Lions	40	(26)
2022	Avaí FC	37	(8)
2023	Remo	32	(12)
2024	Joinville	4	(0)
- * Club domestic league appearances and goals as of 27 November 2023

Luiz Guilherme da Conceição Silva (born 16 June 1986), commonly known as Muriqui, is a Brazilian professional footballer.

His nickname, Muriqui, comes from the district where he was born, Muriqui, Mangaratiba.

== Club career ==
=== Early career ===
Luiz Guilherme started his senior career in 2004 with Madureira. Considered as a talented player, he was loaned to several higher level Brazilian clubs including Vasco da Gama, Avaí and transferred to Desportivo Brasil in 2008. Luiz Guilherme was called up for Brazil U-20 while he was playing for Vasco da Gama.

On 14 April 2009, Luiz Guilherme was loaned to Campeonato Brasileiro Série A club Avaí again. In season 2009, he was considered as one of the best players in the club, with 139 fouls suffered throughout the season, which was the highest in the league.

At the end of 2009, it was reported that Luiz Guilherme decided to leave from the club. He joined Atlético Mineiro on 13 January 2010.

=== Guangzhou Evergrande ===
==== 2010 season ====
On 30 June 2010, China League One club Guangzhou Evergrande confirmed that they had signed Luiz Guilherme on a four-year deal from Atlético Mineiro with a club record fee (as well as the domestic record fee) of US$3.5 million. He made his League One debut for Guangzhou against Nanjing Yoyo on 21 July and scored four goals in the match. In season 2010, Luiz Guilherme scored 13 goals in 14 appearances as Guangzhou finished first place in the League One and won promotion back to the top flight at the first attempt.

==== 2011 season ====
Although Guangzhou signed a few strong players to strengthened the team's attacking power including Argentinian Darío Conca and Brazilian Cléo in the 2011 league season, Luiz Guilherme was still the most important part of the club. He scored his first two CSL goals in a 2–2 home draw against Beijing Guoan on 17 April 2011. On 4 May, Luiz Guilherme scored a hat-trick in a 2011 Chinese FA Cup match which Guangzhou Evergrande beat China League One side Guizhou Zhicheng at Yuexiushan Stadium. He became Guangzhou's first player to score a hat-trick in the Chinese FA Cup.

On 12 August 2011, a conflict near the end of first half in the match while Guangzhou played away against Liaoning Whowin became the center of attention. In a hearing held by Chinese Football Association 4 days later, the CFA believed that Luiz Guilherme struck Zhao Junzhe in the conflict, which resulted in a ban of 5 matches (including reserve league) and him being fined ¥25,000. Luiz Guilherme expressed his disappointment about the ban which he believed to be unfair in his Weibo and said he would leave China at the end of the season. However, after several talks with the club, Luiz Guilherme changed his mind and said he would happy to stay in China and fulfil his contract. Although missing 4 matches of the league, Luiz Guilherme scored 16 goals in 26 appearances in the season which made him the top goal scorer of the league. Guangzhou successfully achieved Super League champion for the first time in the club's history. Luiz Guilherme won the CFA Footballer of the Year award in December 2011.

==== 2012 season ====
At the start of the 2012 season, Luiz Guilherme helped Guangzhou win the 2012 Chinese FA Super Cup by beating Tianjin Teda 2–1 on 25 February. He scored his first AFC Champions League goal in a 2012 AFC Champions League group stage match, the club's first AFC Champions League match, as Guangzhou defeated K-League champions Jeonbuk Hyundai Motors 5–1 away on 7 March. He scored twice in another Champions League match which Guangzhou beat J.League Division 1 champions Kashiwa Reysol 3–1 at home on 17 April. His three goals in the group stage ensured Guangzhou Evergrande to reach the knockout phase of the AFC Champions League. Luiz Guilherme scored his first hat-trick in the Super League, in a 5–1 home victory against Jiangsu Sainty on 17 June. On 3 July, Luiz Guilherme signed a new contract with Guangzhou Evergrande, keeping him at the club until 30 June 2016. On 19 September, Luiz Guilherme was injured after being tackled heavily by Osama Al-Muwallad during a Champions League match against Al-Ittihad at Prince Abdullah al-Faisal Stadium. The injury prevented Luiz Guilherme from playing for Guangzhou Evergrande for the rest of Super League and Champions League match and they won the league narrowly but was knocked out of their first Champions League journey by Al-Ittihad in the quarter-finals. Luiz Guilherme made his return from injury in the second leg of 2012 Chinese FA Cup final as Guangzhou won their first FA Cup title by defeating Guizhou Renhe 5–3 on aggregate.

==== 2013 season ====
Luiz Guilherme started the 2013 season by scoring a goal and an assist in the first round of 2013 AFC Champions League group stage match, a 3–0 home victory over J.League side Urawa Red Diamonds. The goal he scored in this match made him the top scorer of Guangzhou's professional history, overtaking Luis Ramírez's previous club record of 48 goals. He continued his excellent form in the Champions League, scoring six goals in the first five group stage match including one goal in the 3–0 home victory against Urawa Red Diamonds, one goal in the 1–1 away draw against Jeonbuk Hyundai Motors, one goal in the 4–0 home victory against Muangthong United, two goals in the 4–1 away victory against Muangthong United and one goal in the 3–2 away defeat against Urawa Red Diamonds. Luiz Guilherme scored his seventh and eighth Champions League goals in both legs of round of 16 against Australia's A-League side Central Coast Mariners while Guangzhou won 5–1 on aggregate. On 18 September 2013, he scored his ninth goal in the second leg of quarter-finals against Qatar's Lekhwiya in a 4–1 away win. On 25 September 2013, he scored twice in the first leg of semi-finals during a 4–1 away win against Kashiwa Reysol. He hit a brace in the second leg at Tianhe Stadium in a 4–0 home victory against Kashiwa Reysol on 2 October, bringing his tally to 13 goals in 12 Champions League games. It was also the highest number of goals ever scored by one player at a single AFC Champions League tournament, breaking Brazilian striker Ricardo Oliveira's record of 12 goals in the 2012 AFC Champions League.

Although Luiz Guilherme didn't score in either leg of the 2013 AFC Champions League Final against K-League side FC Seoul, he provided a crucial assist in the second leg on 9 November 2013 which Elkeson converted into the goal. Guangzhou Evergrande secured the title on the away goals rule and became the first Chinese club to be crowned Asian club champions since 1990. Luiz Guilherme won the top goalscorer and Most Valuable Player award of the competition. On 26 November, he was named AFC Foreign Player of the Year at the AFC Annual Awards ceremony. Luiz Guilherme played all three matches for Guangzhou Evergrande in the 2013 FIFA Club World Cup. On 21 December 2013, he scored a goal in the third place match against his former team Atlético Mineiro.

==== 2014 season ====
Luiz Guilherme was linked with Qatar Stars League side Al Sadd and Saudi Premier League side Al Shabab after the end of the 2013 season. However, he eventually decided to stay in Guangzhou for the 2014 season. He suffered a muscle bruise in the pre-season training. Although Luiz Guilherme caught up the first match of the season against Melbourne Victory in the 2014 AFC Champions League just in time, he was substituted off by Liao Lisheng when Guangzhou was losing 2–0 in the first half. He had to fight with the injury in the first half of the season and scored his first goal of the season against Liaoning Whowin on 26 April 2014. He scored twice in the first leg of the Round of 16 in the 2014 AFC Champions League, which ensured Guangzhou beat J.League side Cerezo Osaka 5–1 at Nagai Stadium.

He left Guangzhou as the top scorer of the club, scoring 77 goals in 133 appearances. Liu Yongzhuo, chairman of Guangzhou Evergrande, promised that the club would resign Luiz Guilherme in 2017 after he finished his contract at Al Sadd.

=== Al Sadd ===
On 10 July 2014, Al Sadd announced that they had officially signed Luiz Guilherme. According to Guangzhou Evergrande, the transfer fee was up to US$8 million. On 13 August 2014, Luiz Guilherme made his official debut for Al Sadd in the 2014 Sheikh Jassem Cup and scored two goals in the match, which ensured Al Sadd beat Lekhwiya 3–2. He kept on playing in the quarter-finals of 2014 AFC Champions League against Saudi Arabian team Al-Hilal. He didn't score in both legs as Al Sadd was eliminated with 1–0 on aggregate. He suffered a muscle bruise recurrence in late August and received surgical treatment in early September 2014. Luiz Guilherme made his return on 28 February 2015 in a league match against Lekhwiya. On 22 March 2015, he scored first time in the Qatar Stars League against Al-Khor, which ensured Al Sadd's 5–1 away victory. In February 2016, Luiz Guilherme was removed from Al Sadd's squad.

=== FC Tokyo ===
On 1 April 2016, Luiz Guilherme was loaned to J.League Division 1 side FC Tokyo for one season. He also played for FC Tokyo U-23 in the J.League Division 3. He made his debut for FC Tokyo on 10 April 2016 against Kashiwa Reysol. On 1 May 2016, he scored his first goal in a J3 League against Tochigi SC with 1–1 draw. He scored his first J1 League goal on 22 June 2016 in a 3–2 away defeat against Urawa Red Diamonds. On 31 August 2016, Luiz Guilherme suffered an injury of fibular collateral ligament in his left knee in the first leg of 2016 J.League Cup quarter-finals against Avispa Fukuoka. Although he was evaluated to return field in two months, he didn't play for FC Tokyo for the rest of the season.

Luiz Guilherme signed an intent contract with FC Tokyo in December 2016 after he terminated his contract with Al Sadd in advance. However, he was recruited by his former club Vasco da Gama in January 2017. FC Tokyo officially announced Luiz Guilherme's leave on 6 January 2017.

=== Vasco da Gama ===
Luiz Guilherme signed a one-and-a-half-year contract with Vasco da Gama in January 2017. Failing to establish himself within the team, he terminated his contract with the club by mutual consent in July 2017.

=== Return to Guangzhou ===
On 12 July 2017, Luiz Guilherme returned to Guangzhou Evergrande Taobao on a free transfer, signing a half-year contract. He made his return debut on 19 July 2017 in a 4–2 defeat against city rivals Guangzhou R&F at Yuexiushan Stadium in the first leg of 2017 Chinese FA Cup fifth round, coming on as a substitute for Zhang Wenzhao in the 57th minute. He assisted Alan Carvalho's goal in the 85th minute. He scored two goals in the second leg on 1 August 2017, which ensured Guangzhou Evergrande's 7–2 home win and advance to the semi-final. On 10 August 2017, Luiz Guilherme made his return league debut in a 3–0 away win against Liaoning FC. Luiz Guilherme was named in Guangzhou's squad for the 2017 AFC Champions League on 15 August 2017 after Paulinho's leave for FC Barcelona. On 19 August 2017, he scored twice in a 3–0 away win over Shanghai Greenland Shenhua in the Chinese Super League. Luiz Guilherme scored four goals in eight league appearances and won his fourth Chinese Super League title in the 2017 season. On 9 November 2017, Luiz Guilherme suggested that he would not extent his contract with Guangzhou.

=== Meizhou Meixian Techand ===
On 16 January 2018, Luiz Guilherme joined China League One newcomer Meizhou Meixian Techand. On 10 March 2018, he made his debut in the season's opener against Yanbian Funde and was substituted off in the 44th minute due to injury. He scored his first goal in his 4th appearance on 14 April 2018 in a 3–2 away defeat to Shanghai Shenxin. On 22 April 2018, he scored a hat-trick in a 4–2 home win over Zhejiang Yiteng. Luiz Guilherme continued his promising performance in the following matches, scoring eight goals in six matches. However, he received a ban of 8 matches on 16 May 2018 for his unsporting act during a league match against Beijing Enterprises Group. Luiz Guilherme scored 16 goals in 20 appearances in the 2018 season; however, Meizhou Meixian Techand renounced to extend his contract at the end of the season.

=== Shijiazhuang Ever Bright ===
On 4 January 2019, Luiz Guilherme transferred to fellow League One side Shijiazhuang Ever Bright.

=== Avaí ===
In January 2022, Luiz Guilherme returned to Avaí.

== International career ==
In 2004, Luiz Guilherme was called up to the Brazil under-20 national team training camp.

== Personal life ==
Luiz Guilherme married Aline Pimenta on 6 December 2010. On 18 April 2013, their son, Gabriel, was born in Guangzhou, China.

== Career statistics ==
As of match played 11 November 2020

Appearances and goals by club, season and competition
Club	Season	League			National cup (Note: Includes Copa do Brasil, Chinese FA Cup, Emir Cup)		League cup (Note: Includes Qatar Cup, J.League Cup)		Continental		Other		Total	
Club	Season	Division	Apps	Goals	Apps	Goals	Apps	Goals	Apps	Goals	Apps	Goals	Apps	Goals
Vasco da Gama (loan)	2004	Série A	13	3	0	0	–		–		0	0	13	3
Vasco da Gama (loan)	2005	Série A	2	0	0	0	–		–		0	0	2	0
Vasco da Gama (loan)	Total		15	3	0	0	–		–		0	0	15	3
Paysandu (loan)	2006	Série B	12	1	0	0	–		–		0	0	12	1
Avaí (loan)	2007	Série B	20	5	0	0	–		–		0	0	20	5
Vitória (loan)	2008	Série A	12	0	0	0	–		–		0	0	12	0
Ituano (loan)	2009	Série A1	–		–		–		–		16 (Note: Appearances in Campeonato Paulista)	2	16	2
Avaí (loan)	2009	Série A	31	9	–		–		–		0	0	31	9
Atlético Mineiro (loan)	2010	Série A	7	4	7	1	–		–		1 (Note: Appearance in Campeonato Mineiro)	0	15	5
Guangzhou Evergrande	2010	China League One	14	13	–		–		–		–		14	13
Guangzhou Evergrande	2011	Chinese Super League	26	16	2	4	–		–		–		28	20
Guangzhou Evergrande	2012	Chinese Super League	20	12	2	0	–		8 (Note: Appearances in AFC Champions League)	3	1 (Note: Appearance in Chinese FA Super Cup)	0	31	15
Guangzhou Evergrande	2013	Chinese Super League	26	9	3	2	–		14	13	4 (Note: One appearance in Chinese FA Super Cup, three appearances and one goal in FIFA Club World Cup)	1	47	25
Guangzhou Evergrande	2014	Chinese Super League	6	2	0	0	–		7	2	0	0	13	4
Guangzhou Evergrande	Total		92	52	7	6	–		29	18	5	1	133	77
Al Sadd	2014–15	Qatar Stars League	7	4	3	2	1	0	2	0	1 (Note: Appearance in Sheikh Jassem Cup)	2	14	8
Al Sadd	2015–16	Qatar Stars League	16	11	0	0	0	0	7	2	1	0	24	13
Al Sadd	Total		23	15	3	2	1	0	9	2	2	2	38	21
FC Tokyo (loan)	2016	J1 League	19	4	0	0	1	0	0	0	–		20	4
FC Tokyo U-23 (loan)	2016	J3 League	3	1	–		–		–		–		3	1
Vasco da Gama	2017	Série A	2	0	2	0	–		–		7 (Note: Appearances in Campeonato Carioca)	0	11	0
Guangzhou Evergrande	2017	Chinese Super League	8	4	3	2	–		2	0	–		13	6
Meizhou Meixian Techand	2018	China League One	20	16	0	0	–		–		–		20	16
Cangzhou Mighty Lions	2019	China League One	24	21	1	1	–		–		–		25	22
Cangzhou Mighty Lions	2020	Chinese Super League	16	5	0	0	–		–		–		16	5
Cangzhou Mighty Lions	Total		40	26	1	1	–		–		–		41	27
Career total			304	140	23	12	2	0	40	20	31	5	400	177

== Honours ==
Atlético Mineiro

- Campeonato Mineiro: 2010

Guangzhou Evergrande

- AFC Champions League: 2013
- Chinese Super League: 2011, 2012, 2013, 2017
- Chinese FA Cup: 2012
- Chinese FA Super Cup: 2012
- China League One: 2010

Al Sadd

- Emir of Qatar Cup: 2015
- Sheikh Jassim Cup: 2014
