= 2013 AFC Champions League =

32nd edition of premier club football tournament organized by the AFC

Tournament details
- Dates: 9 February – 9 November 2013
- Teams: 35 (from 10 associations)

Final positions
- Champions: (China) Guangzhou Evergrande (1st title)
- Runners-up: (South Korea) FC Seoul

Tournament statistics
- Matches played: 126
- Goals scored: 342 (2.71 per match)
- Attendance: 1,996,166 (15,843 per match)
- Top scorer(s): Muriqui (13 goals)
- Best player: Muriqui

The 2013 AFC Champions League was the 32nd edition of the top-level Asian club football tournament organized by the Asian Football Confederation (AFC), and the 11th under the current AFC Champions League title. The defending champions, Ulsan Hyundai, failed to qualify for the tournament.

In the final, Chinese team Guangzhou Evergrande defeated South Korean team FC Seoul on away goals to win their first title, becoming the first Chinese team to win the AFC Champions League (and the second Chinese team to be crowned Asian club champions after Liaoning FC and Third Final of a Chinese team after Dalian Shide lost to Pohang Steelers in the final of the 1997–98 Asian Club Championship), and qualified for the 2013 FIFA Club World Cup.

== Allocation of entries per association ==
The AFC laid out the procedure for deciding the participating associations and the allocation of slots, with inspection of the associations interested in participating in the AFC Champions League to be done in 2012, and the final decision to be made by the AFC in November 2012.

The following criteria for participation in the AFC Champions League were proposed by the AFC in July 2012:

- The member association (MA) has to acquire a minimum number of 600 points out of a possible 1000 according to the AFC evaluating system to qualify for participation.
- The slots for each eligible MA are decided based on the points ranking of the MAs:
  - The top two ranked MAs in both the East and West zones get four direct slots each.
  - The third-ranked MAs get three direct and one play-off slot.
  - The fourth-ranked MAs get two direct and one play-off slot.
  - The fifth-ranked MAs get one direct and one play-off slot.
  - The sixth, seventh and eighth-ranked MAs get only a play-off slot each.
- The maximum number of slots for each MA is one-third of the total number of clubs in the top division (e.g., Australia can only get a maximum of three total slots as there are only nine Australia-based clubs in the A-League).

On 29 November 2012, the AFC Executive Committee approved the slots for the 2013 edition of the AFC Champions League. However, this final allocation of slots did not fully follow the proposal above.

Evaluation for 2013 AFC Champions League
Fulfills criteria (> 600 points)
Does not fulfill criteria, but allocated slots
Does not fulfill criteria, not allocated slots

West Zone
Rank	Member Association	Points	Slots	
Rank	Member Association	Points	Group stage	Play-off
1	Saudi Arabia	860.5	4	0
2	Qatar	838.2	4	0
3	Iran	813.5	3	1
4	United Arab Emirates	750.2	2	2
5	Uzbekistan	680.8	2	1
6	India	−106.4	0	0
7	Jordan	−128.7	0	0
Total			14	4

East Zone
Rank	Member Association	Points	Slots	
Rank	Member Association	Points	Group stage	Play-off
1	Japan	946.8	4	0
2	South Korea	886.6	4	0
3	China PR	796.7	4	0
4	Australia	567.0	1	1
5	Thailand	177.2	1	1
6	Singapore	−135.1	0	0
7	Vietnam	−815.7	0	0
Total			15	2

Notes

1. One of the two group stage direct entrants from Uzbekistan was moved to the East Zone.

== Teams ==
The following teams entered the competition.

In the following table, the number of appearances and last appearance count only those since the 2002–03 season (including qualifying rounds), when the competition was rebranded as the AFC Champions League.

West Zone
Team	Qualifying method	App	Last App
Group stage direct entrants (Groups A–D)
(Saudi Arabia) Al-Shabab	2011–12 Saudi Professional League champions	7th	2011
(Saudi Arabia) Al-Ahli	2012 King Cup of Champions winners 2011–12 Saudi Professional League runners-up	6th	2012
(Saudi Arabia) Al-Hilal	2011–12 Saudi Professional League 3rd place	9th	2012
(Saudi Arabia) Al-Ettifaq	2011–12 Saudi Professional League 4th place	3rd	2012
(Qatar) Lekhwiya	2011–12 Qatar Stars League champions	2nd	2012
(Qatar) Al-Gharafa	2012 Emir of Qatar Cup winners	8th	2012
(Qatar) El Jaish	2011–12 Qatar Stars League runners-up	1st	none
(Qatar) Al-Rayyan	2011–12 Qatar Stars League 3rd place	5th	2012
(Iran) Sepahan	2011–12 Iran Pro League champions super cup Iran 2012	9th	2012
(Iran) Esteghlal	2011–12 Hazfi Cup winners 2011–12 Iran Pro League 3rd place super cup Iran 2012	6th	2012
(Iran) Tractor	2011–12 Iran Pro League runners-up	1st	none
(United Arab Emirates) Al-Ain	2011–12 UAE Pro-League champions	8th	2011
(United Arab Emirates) Al-Jazira	2011–12 UAE President's Cup winners	5th	2012
(Uzbekistan) Pakhtakor	2012 Uzbek League champions	11th	2012
Qualifying play-off participants
(Iran) Saba Qom	2011–12 Iran Pro League 4th place	3rd	2009
(United Arab Emirates) Al-Nasr	2011–12 UAE Pro-League runners-up	2nd	2012
(United Arab Emirates) Al-Shabab Al-Arabi	2011–12 UAE Pro-League 3rd place	3rd	2012
(Uzbekistan) Lokomotiv Tashkent	2012 Uzbek League 3rd place	1st	none

East Zone
Team	Qualifying method	App	Last App
Group stage direct entrants (Groups E–H)
(Japan) Sanfrecce Hiroshima	2012 J. League Division 1 champions	2nd	2010
(Japan) Kashiwa Reysol	2012 Emperor's Cup winners	2nd	2012
(Japan) Vegalta Sendai	2012 J. League Division 1 runners-up	1st	none
(Japan) Urawa Red Diamonds	2012 J. League Division 1 3rd place	3rd	2008
(South Korea) FC Seoul	2012 K-League champions	3rd	2011
(South Korea) Pohang Steelers	2012 Korean FA Cup winners 2012 K-League 3rd place	5th	2012
(South Korea) Jeonbuk Hyundai Motors	2012 K-League runners-up	7th	2012
(South Korea) Suwon Samsung Bluewings	2012 K-League 4th place	5th	2011
(China) Guangzhou Evergrande	2012 Chinese Super League champions 2012 Chinese FA Cup winners	2nd	2012
(China) Jiangsu Sainty	2012 Chinese Super League runners-up	1st	none
(China) Beijing Guoan	2012 Chinese Super League 3rd place	5th	2012
(China) Guizhou Renhe	2012 Chinese Super League 4th place	1st	none
(Uzbekistan) Bunyodkor	2012 Uzbekistan Cup winners 2012 Uzbek League runners-up	6th	2012
(Australia) Central Coast Mariners	2011–12 A-League premiers	3rd	2012
(Thailand) Muangthong United	2012 Thai Premier League champions	3rd	2011
Qualifying play-off participants
(Australia) Brisbane Roar	2012 A-League Grand Final winners	2nd	2012
(Thailand) Buriram United	2012 Thai FA Cup winners	3rd	2012

== Schedule ==
The schedule of the competition was as follows (all draws held at AFC headquarters in Kuala Lumpur, Malaysia).

Phase	Round	Draw date	First leg	Second leg
Qualifying play-off	Round 1	6 December 2012	9 February 2013	
Group stage	Matchday 1	6 December 2012	26–27 February 2013	
Group stage	Matchday 2	6 December 2012	12–13 March 2013	
Group stage	Matchday 3	6 December 2012	2–3 April 2013	
Group stage	Matchday 4	6 December 2012	9–10 April 2013	
Group stage	Matchday 5	6 December 2012	23–24 April 2013	
Group stage	Matchday 6	6 December 2012	30 April–1 May 2013	
Knock-out stage	Round of 16	6 December 2012	14–15 May 2013	21–22 May 2013
Knock-out stage	Quarter-finals	20 June 2013	21 August 2013	18 September 2013
Knock-out stage	Semi-finals	20 June 2013	25 September 2013	2 October 2013
Knock-out stage	Final	20 June 2013	25 or 26 October 2013	8 or 9 November 2013

=== Format changes ===
The following changes in the format of the competition were made compared with the previous year:

- Losers of the AFC Champions League qualifying play-off did not participate in the AFC Cup.
- The round of 16 was played over two legs on a home-and-away basis instead of as a single match.
- The final was played over two legs on a home-and-away basis instead of as a single match.

== Qualifying play-off ==
The draw for the qualifying play-off was held on 6 December 2012. Each tie was played as a single match, with extra time and penalty shoot-out used to decide the winner if necessary. The winners of each tie advanced to the group stage to join the 29 automatic qualifiers.

Team 1	Score	Team 2
West Zone
Saba Qom (Iran)	1–1 (aet)(3–5p)	(United Arab Emirates) Al-Shabab Al-Arabi
Al-Nasr (United Arab Emirates)	3–2	(Uzbekistan) Lokomotiv Tashkent
East Zone
Buriram United (Thailand)	0–0 (a.e.t.) (3–0p)	(Australia) Brisbane Roar

Notes

2. Brisbane Roar was given home advantage in the original draw, but the match was later switched to be hosted by Buriram United per agreement between the two teams due to rescheduling of the match from the original date.

== Group stage ==

The draw for the group stage was held on 6 December 2012. The 32 teams were drawn into eight groups of four. Teams from the same association could not be drawn into the same group. Each group was played on a home-and-away round-robin basis. The winners and runners-up of each group advanced to the round of 16.

Tiebreakers

The teams are ranked according to points (3 points for a win, 1 point for a tie, 0 points for a loss). If tied on points, tiebreakers are applied in the following order:

1. Greater number of points obtained in the group matches between the teams concerned
2. Goal difference resulting from the group matches between the teams concerned
3. Greater number of goals scored in the group matches between the teams concerned (away goals do not apply)
4. Goal difference in all the group matches
5. Greater number of goals scored in all the group matches
6. Penalty shoot-out if only two teams are involved and they are both on the field of play
7. Fewer score calculated according to the number of yellow and red cards received in the group matches (1 point for a single yellow card, 3 points for a red card as a consequence of two yellow cards, 3 points for a direct red card, 4 points for a yellow card followed by a direct red card)
8. Drawing of lots

=== Group A ===
Pos	Team	Pld	W	D	L	GF	GA	GD	Pts	Qualification	SHB	JSH	JAZ	TRA
1	(Saudi Arabia) Al-Shabab	6	4	1	1	7	5	+2	13	Advance to knockout stage	—	2–0	2–1	1–0
2	(Qatar) El Jaish	6	3	2	1	14	9	+5	11	Advance to knockout stage	3–0	—	3–1	3–3
3	(United Arab Emirates) Al-Jazira	6	1	2	3	7	10	−3	5		1–1	1–1	—	2–0
4	(Iran) Tractor Sazi	6	1	1	4	8	12	−4	4		0–1	2–4	3–1	—

=== Group B ===
Pos	Team	Pld	W	D	L	GF	GA	GD	Pts	Qualification	LEK	SHA	ETT	PAK
1	(Qatar) Lekhwiya	6	3	2	1	10	7	+3	11	Advance to knockout stage	—	2–1	2–0	3–1
2	(United Arab Emirates) Al-Shabab Al-Arabi	6	3	0	3	8	9	−1	9	Advance to knockout stage	3–1	—	1–0	0–1
3	(Saudi Arabia) Al-Ettifaq	6	2	1	3	6	5	+1	7		0–0	4–1	—	2–0
4	(Uzbekistan) Pakhtakor	6	2	1	3	6	9	−3	7		2–2	1–2	1–0	—

Tiebreakers

- Al-Ettifaq are ranked ahead of Pakhtakor on head-to-head record.

=== Group C ===
Pos	Team	Pld	W	D	L	GF	GA	GD	Pts	Qualification	AHL	GHA	SEP	NAS
1	(Saudi Arabia) Al-Ahli	6	4	2	0	16	8	+8	14	Advance to knockout stage	—	2–0	4–1	2–2
2	(Qatar) Al-Gharafa	6	3	1	2	13	11	+2	10	Advance to knockout stage	2–2	—	3–1	3–1
3	(Iran) Sepahan	6	3	0	3	12	13	−1	9		2–4	3–1	—	3–0
4	(United Arab Emirates) Al-Nasr	6	0	1	5	7	16	−9	1		1–2	2–4	1–2	—

=== Group D ===
Pos	Team	Pld	W	D	L	GF	GA	GD	Pts	Qualification	EST	HIL	AIN	RAY
1	(Iran) Esteghlal	6	4	1	1	11	5	+6	13	Advance to knockout stage	—	0–1	2–0	3–0
2	(Saudi Arabia) Al-Hilal	6	4	0	2	10	6	+4	12	Advance to knockout stage	1–2	—	2–0	3–1
3	(United Arab Emirates) Al-Ain	6	2	0	4	6	9	−3	6		0–1	3–1	—	2–1
4	(Qatar) Al-Rayyan	6	1	1	4	7	14	−7	4		3–3	0–2	2–1	—

Source: ScoresPro

=== Group E ===
Pos	Team	Pld	W	D	L	GF	GA	GD	Pts	Qualification	SEO	BUR	JIA	SEN
1	(South Korea) FC Seoul	6	3	2	1	11	5	+6	11	Advance to knockout stage	—	2–2	5–1	2–1
2	(Thailand) Buriram United	6	1	4	1	6	6	0	7	Advance to knockout stage	0–0	—	2–0	1–1
3	(China) Jiangsu Sainty	6	2	1	3	5	10	−5	7		0–2	2–0	—	0–0
4	(Japan) Vegalta Sendai	6	1	3	2	5	6	−1	6		1–0	1–1	1–2	—

Tiebreakers

- Buriram United and Jiangsu Sainty are tied on head-to-head record, and so are ranked by overall goal difference.

=== Group F ===
Pos	Team	Pld	W	D	L	GF	GA	GD	Pts	Qualification	GUA	JEO	URA	MUA
1	(China) Guangzhou Evergrande	6	3	2	1	14	5	+9	11	Advance to knockout stage	—	0–0	3–0	4–0
2	(South Korea) Jeonbuk Hyundai Motors	6	2	4	0	10	6	+4	10	Advance to knockout stage	1–1	—	2–2	2–0
3	(Japan) Urawa Red Diamonds	6	3	1	2	11	11	0	10		3–2	1–3	—	4–1
4	(Thailand) Muangthong United	6	0	1	5	4	17	−13	1		1–4	2–2	0–1	—

Tiebreakers

- Jeonbuk Hyundai Motors are ranked ahead of Urawa Red Diamonds on head-to-head record.

=== Group G ===
Pos	Team	Pld	W	D	L	GF	GA	GD	Pts	Qualification	BUN	BEI	POH	HIR
1	(Uzbekistan) Bunyodkor	6	2	4	0	6	3	+3	10	Advance to knockout stage	—	0–0	2–2	0–0
2	(China) Beijing Guoan	6	2	3	1	4	2	+2	9	Advance to knockout stage	0–1	—	2–0	2–1
3	(South Korea) Pohang Steelers	6	1	4	1	5	6	−1	7		1–1	0–0	—	1–1
4	(Japan) Sanfrecce Hiroshima	6	0	3	3	2	6	−4	3		0–2	0–0	0–1	—

=== Group H ===
Pos	Team	Pld	W	D	L	GF	GA	GD	Pts	Qualification	KSW	CCM	GUI	SUW
1	(Japan) Kashiwa Reysol	6	4	2	0	14	4	+10	14	Advance to knockout stage	—	3–1	1–1	0–0
2	(Australia) Central Coast Mariners	6	2	1	3	5	9	−4	7	Advance to knockout stage	0–3	—	2–1	0–0
3	(China) Guizhou Renhe	6	1	3	2	6	7	−1	6		0–1	2–1	—	2–2
4	(South Korea) Suwon Samsung Bluewings	6	0	4	2	4	9	−5	4		2–6	0–1	0–0	—

== Knockout stage ==
In the knock-out stage, the 16 teams played a single-elimination tournament. Each tie was played on a home-and-away two-legged basis. The away goals rule, extra time (away goals do not apply in extra time) and penalty shoot-out were used to decide the winner if necessary.

=== Bracket ===
Round of 16
(Qatar) El Jaish	1	0	1
(Saudi Arabia) Al-Ahli	1	2	3
(China) Beijing Guoan	0	1	1
(South Korea) FC Seoul	0	3	3
(United Arab Emirates) Al-Shabab Al-Arabi	2	0	2
(Iran) Esteghlal	4	0	4
(Thailand) Buriram United	2	0	2
(Uzbekistan) Bunyodkor	1	0	1
(South Korea) Jeonbuk Hyundai Motors	0	2	2
(Japan) Kashiwa Reysol	2	3	5
(Qatar) Al-Gharafa	1	0	1
(Saudi Arabia) Al-Shabab	2	3	5
(Australia) Central Coast Mariners	1	0	1
(China) Guangzhou Evergrande	2	3	5
(Saudi Arabia) Al-Hilal	0	2	2
(Qatar) Lekhwiya	1	2	3

Quarter-finals
(Saudi Arabia) Al-Ahli	1	0	1
(South Korea) FC Seoul	1	1	2
(Iran) Esteghlal	1	2	3
(Thailand) Buriram United	0	1	1
(Japan) Kashiwa Reysol (a)	1	2	3
(Saudi Arabia) Al-Shabab	1	2	3
(China) Guangzhou Evergrande	2	4	6
(Qatar) Lekhwiya	0	1	1

Semi-finals
(South Korea) FC Seoul	2	2	4
(Iran) Esteghlal	0	2	2
(Japan) Kashiwa Reysol	1	0	1
(China) Guangzhou Evergrande	4	4	8

Final
(South Korea) FC Seoul	2	1	3
(China) Guangzhou Evergrande (a)	2	1	3

=== Round of 16 ===
In the round of 16, the winners of one group played the runners-up of another group in the same zone, with the group winners hosting the second leg.

West Zone
Team 1	Agg.	Team 2	1st leg	2nd leg
Al-Gharafa (Qatar)	1–5	(Saudi Arabia) Al-Shabab	1–2	0–3
El Jaish (Qatar)	1–3	(Saudi Arabia) Al-Ahli	1–1	0–2
Al-Hilal (Saudi Arabia)	2–3	(Qatar) Lekhwiya	0–1	2–2
Al-Shabab Al-Arabi (United Arab Emirates)	2–4	(Iran) Esteghlal	2–4	0–0

East Zone
Team 1	Agg.	Team 2	1st leg	2nd leg
Beijing Guoan (China)	1–3	(South Korea) FC Seoul	0–0	1–3
Buriram United (Thailand)	2−1	(Uzbekistan) Bunyodkor	2–1	0−0
Central Coast Mariners (Australia)	1–5	(China) Guangzhou Evergrande	1–2	0–3
Jeonbuk Hyundai Motors (South Korea)	2–5	(Japan) Kashiwa Reysol	0–2	2–3

=== Quarter-finals ===
The draw for the quarter-finals, semi-finals, and final (to decide the order of two legs) was held on 20 June 2013. In this draw, teams from different zones could play each other, and the "country protection" rule was applied: if there are exactly two teams from the same association, they may not play each other in the quarter-finals; however, if there are more than two teams from the same association, they may play each other in the quarter-finals.

Team 1	Agg.	Team 2	1st leg	2nd leg
Al-Ahli (Saudi Arabia)	1–2	(South Korea) FC Seoul	1–1	0–1
Esteghlal (Iran)	3–1	(Thailand) Buriram United	1–0	2–1
Kashiwa Reysol (Japan)	3–3 (a)	(Saudi Arabia) Al-Shabab	1–1	2–2
Guangzhou Evergrande (China)	6–1	(Qatar) Lekhwiya	2–0	4–1

=== Semi-finals ===
Team 1	Agg.	Team 2	1st leg	2nd leg
FC Seoul (South Korea)	4–2	(Iran) Esteghlal	2–0	2–2
Kashiwa Reysol (Japan)	1–8	(China) Guangzhou Evergrande	1–4	0–4

=== Final ===
26 October 2013
19:30 UTC+9

FC Seoul (South Korea)	2–2	(China) Guangzhou Evergrande
Escudero 11'; Damjanović 83'	Report	Elkeson 30'; Gao Lin 58'

Seoul World Cup Stadium, Seoul
Attendance: 55,501
Referee: Ravshan Irmatov (Uzbekistan)
9 November 2013
20:00 UTC+8

Guangzhou Evergrande (China)	1–1	(South Korea) FC Seoul
Elkeson 58'	Report	Damjanović 63'

Tianhe Stadium, Guangzhou
Attendance: 55,847
Referee: Nawaf Shukralla (Bahrain)

3–3 on aggregate. Guangzhou Evergrande won on away goals.

== Awards ==
Award	Player	Team
Most Valuable Player	(Brazil) Muriqui	(China) Guangzhou Evergrande
Top Goalscorer	(Brazil) Muriqui	(China) Guangzhou Evergrande

AFC Champions League 2013 Dream Team
Starting XI
Pos.	Player	Team
GK	(South Korea) Kim Yong-Dae	(South Korea) FC Seoul
DF	(China) Zhang Linpeng	(China) Guangzhou Evergrande
DF	(Iran) Hanif Omranzadeh	(Iran) Esteghlal
DF	(Japan) Daisuke Suzuki	(Japan) Kashiwa Reysol
DF	(China) Sun Xiang	(China) Guangzhou Evergrande
MF	(China) Zheng Zhi	(China) Guangzhou Evergrande
MF	(Argentina) Darío Conca	(China) Guangzhou Evergrande
MF	(Iran) Javad Nekounam	(Iran) Esteghlal
FW	(Brazil) Muriqui	(China) Guangzhou Evergrande
FW	(Montenegro) Dejan Damjanović	(South Korea) FC Seoul
FW	(Brazil) Elkeson	(China) Guangzhou Evergrande
Substitutes
GK	(Japan) Takanori Sugeno	(Japan) Kashiwa Reysol
DF	(South Korea) Kwak Tae-Hwi	(Saudi Arabia) Al-Shabab
DF	(Thailand) Theeraton Bunmathan	(Thailand) Buriram United
DF	(South Korea) Kim Jin-Kyu	(South Korea) FC Seoul
MF	(South Korea) Ha Dae-Sung	(South Korea) FC Seoul
MF	(Brazil) Jorge Wagner	(Japan) Kashiwa Reysol
FW	(Japan) Masato Kudo	(Japan) Kashiwa Reysol

== Top scorers ==
Rank	Player	Team	MD1	MD2	MD3	MD4	MD5	MD6	2R1	2R2	QF1	QF2	SF1	SF2	F1	F2	Total
1	(Brazil) Muriqui	(China) Guangzhou Evergrande	1	1	1	2	1		1	1		1	2	2			13
2	(Argentina) Darío Conca	(China) Guangzhou Evergrande			2					1	1	1	2	1			8
3	(Montenegro) Dejan Damjanović	(South Korea) FC Seoul	2								1	1	1		1	1	7
3	(Brazil) Wagner Ribeiro	(Qatar) El Jaish		2	2		3										7
5	(Brazil) Elkeson	(China) Guangzhou Evergrande									1	2		1	1	1	6
5	(Japan) Masato Kudo	(Japan) Kashiwa Reysol			2			1	1	1	1						6
7	(Saudi Arabia) Mustafa Al-Bassas	(Saudi Arabia) Al-Ahli	1			2				1							4
7	(Oman) Amad Al Hosni	(Saudi Arabia) Al-Ahli		2	1		1										4
7	(France) Djibril Cissé	(Qatar) Al-Gharafa		2	1		1										4
7	(Brazil) Edgar	(United Arab Emirates) Al-Shabab Al-Arabi	1			1	1		1								4
7	(Tunisia) Youssef Msakni	(Qatar) Lekhwiya	1			1	1		1								4
7	(Qatar) Sebastián Soria	(Qatar) Lekhwiya	1		2	1											4
7	(Argentina) Sebastián Tagliabué	(Saudi Arabia) Al-Shabab				1			1	2							4
7	(South Korea) Yun Il-Lok	(South Korea) FC Seoul	2				1			1							4

Note: Goals scored in qualifying play-off not counted.

== See also ==
- 2013 AFC Cup
- 2013 AFC President's Cup
- 2013 FIFA Club World Cup
