= Ali Abdulnabi =

Bahraini football referee

- Full name: Ali Hasan Ebrahim Abdulnabi
- Born: 14 October 1971 (age 55); Bahrain

International
Years	League	Role
2009–	FIFA listed	Referee

Ali Hasan Ebrahim Abdulnabi (Arabic: علي حسن إبراهيم عبدالنبي; born 14 October 1971) is a Bahraini football referee.

Abdulnabi became a FIFA referee in 2009. He has refereed internationally in 2014 World Cup qualifiers, the ASEAN Football Championship, AFC Cup, and 2013 AFC U-22 Asian Cup qualification. He is also a referee at the Bahraini Premier League.
