= Abdullah Balideh =

Qatari football referee

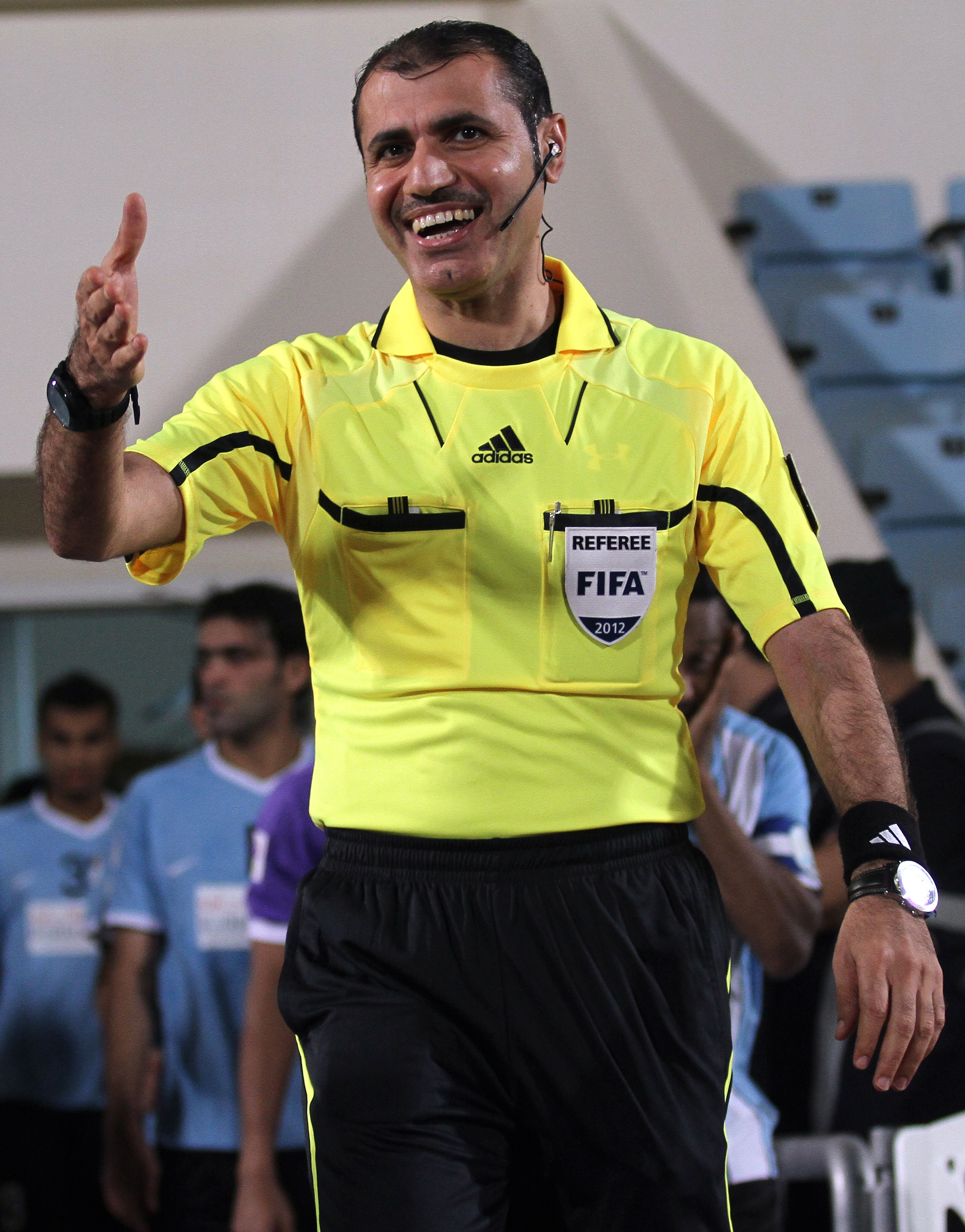
- Full name: Abdullah Dor Mohammad Balideh Baloushi
- Born: 14 February 1970 (age 56); Qatar

International
Years	League	Role
2005-	FIFA listed	Referee

Abdullah Dor Mohammad Balideh Baloushi (born 14 February 1970) is a Qatari football referee who has been a full international referee for FIFA.

Balideh became a FIFA referee in 2005. He served as a referee in the 2010 and 2014 FIFA World Cup qualifiers, as well as the Pan Arab Games.
