= 2012 FC Tokyo season =

FC Tokyo
2012 season
- Chairman: Yutaka Murabayashi
- Manager: Ranko Popović
- J.League: 6th
- Fuji Xerox Super Cup: Runners-up
- Emperor's Cup: Round of 64
- J.League Cup: Quarterfinals
- AFC Champions League: Round of 16
- Top goalscorer: League: Watanabe (4); All: Watanabe (7)
Home colours	Away colours

The 2012 F.C. Tokyo season was the season in which F.C. Tokyo return to the J.League after their unexpected relegation following the 2010 season, making this their 12th top flight season overall. In addition, after winning the first Emperor's Cup in the club's history on January 1, F.C. Tokyo will also play the AFC Champions League, accompanied by the top 3 of the last J-League campaign at the highest club tournament in Asia. Kiyoshi Okuma and the club reached an agreement to end the contractual relationship that bound them together at the end of the 2011 season. With this, Ranko Popović became the new coach for this season.

== Trophies balance ==
Trophy	Started round	First match	Result	Last match
J.League	—	10 March 2012	6th	2 December 2012
Fuji Xerox Super Cup	Final	3 March 2012	Runners-up	3 March 2012
Emperor's Cup	Round of 64	9 September 2012	Round of 64	2012
J.League Cup	Quarterfinals	September 2012	Quarterfinals	2012
AFC Champions League	Group Stage	6 March 2012	Round of 16	30 May 2012

=== Competitive Balance ===
Biggest win
	Home				Away			
J.League	17 March 2012	Matchday 2	v. Yokohama F. Marinos	3 – 1	24 March 2012	Matchday 3	v. Vissel Kobe	0 – 2
J.League	6 May 2012	Matchday 10	v. Albirex Niigata					0 – 2
Emperor's Cup	Date	Matchday	Yokogawa Musashino	0–1	9 September 2012	Matchday 2	Rival	Result
J.League Cup	Date	Matchday	Rival	Result	Date	Matchday	Rival	Result
AFC Champions League	17 April 2012	Group Stage, Matchday 4	v. (China) Beijing Guoan	3 – 0	6 March 2012	Group Stage, Matchday 1	v. (Australia) Brisbane Roar	0 – 2
Biggest loss
J.League	31 March 2012	Matchday 4	v. Sanfrecce Hiroshima	0 – 1	21 April 2012	Matchday 7	v. Vegalta Sendai	4 – 0
J.League	28 April 2012	Matchday 8	v. Shimizu S-Pulse	0 – 1	21 April 2012	Matchday 7	v. Vegalta Sendai	4 – 0
J.League	14 April 2012	Matchday 6	v. Kashima Antlers	1 – 2	21 April 2012	Matchday 7	v. Vegalta Sendai	4 – 0
Emperor's Cup	Date	Matchday	Rival	Result	Date	Matchday	Rival	Result
J.League Cup	Date	Matchday	Rival	Result	Date	Matchday	Rival	Result
AFC Champions League	None registered				16 May 2012	Group Stage, Matchday 6	v. (South Korea) Ulsan Horang	1 – 0
AFC Champions League	None registered				30 May 2012	Round of 16	v. (China) Guangzhou Evergrande	1 – 0

== Winter transfers ==
=== In ===
(substituted on) In (9 players)
Player	From	Fee
(Japan) Kenichi Kaga	(Japan) Júbilo Iwata	Free
(Japan) Yuichi Maruyama	(Japan) Meiji University	Drafted
(South Korea) Jang Hyun-Soo	(South Korea) Yonsei University	Drafted
(Japan) Aria Jasuru Hasegawa	(Japan) Yokohama F. Marinos	Free
(Japan) Kento Hashimoto	(Japan) FC Tokyo Youth Team	Free
(Japan) Kazuma Watanabe	(Japan) Yokohama F. Marinos	Free
(Japan) Yohei Hayashi	(Japan) Chuo University	Drafted
(Japan) Kosuke Ota	(Japan) Shimizu S-Pulse	TBA
(Japan) Hiroki Kawano	(Japan) Tokyo Verdy	TBA

=== Out ===
(substituted off) Out (7 players)
Player	New Team	Fee
(Japan) Tomokazu Nagira	(Japan) Gainare Tottori	Free
(Australia) Jade North	(Japan) Consadole Sapporo	Free
(Japan) Kota Morimura	(Japan) Giravanz Kitakyushu	Free
(Japan) Toshihiro Matsushita	(Japan) Vegalta Sendai	Free
(Japan) Yasuyuki Konno	(Japan) Gamba Osaka	¥100M
(Japan) Tatsuya Suzuki	(Japan) Tokushima Vortis	Free
(Japan) Daisuke Sakata	(Japan) Avispa Fukuoka	TBA

=== Loan out ===
(substituted off) Loan out (3 players)
Player	Team
(Japan) Ryo Hiraide	(Japan) Kataller Toyama
(Japan) Takumi Abe	(Japan) Yokohama FC
(Brazil) Roberto César	(Brazil) Coritiba

=== Loan return ===
(substituted on) Loan return (3 players)
Italics for players returning to the club but left it during pre-season
Player	From
(Japan) Shuto Kono	(Japan) Ōita Trinita
(Japan) Yohei Otake	(Japan) Cerezo Osaka
(Japan) Kentaro Shigematsu	(Japan) Avispa Fukuoka
(Japan) Toshihiro Matsushita	(Japan) Vegalta Sendai
(Japan) Ryo Hiraide	(Japan) Kataller Toyama
(Japan) Kota Morimura	(Japan) Giravanz Kitakyushu

=== Loan end ===
(substituted off) Loan end (4 players)
Player	Returns to
(Brazil) Pedro Júnior	(Japan) Gamba Osaka
(Japan) Daiki Takamatsu	(Japan) Ōita Trinita
(Japan) Kazumasa Uesato	(Japan) Consadole Sapporo
(Japan) Genki Nagasato	(Japan) Ventforet Kofu

== Current squad ==
- Updated to 4 February 2012

Note: Flags indicate national team as defined under FIFA eligibility rules; some limited exceptions apply. Players may hold more than one non-FIFA nationality.

No.	Pos.	Nation	Player
30	GK	BRA	DominiK Markovič
1	GK	JPN	Hitoshi Shiota
2	DF	JPN	Yuhei Tokunaga
3	DF	JPN	Masato Morishige
4	DF	JPN	Hideto Takahashi
5	DF	JPN	Kenichi Kaga
6	DF	JPN	Kosuke Ota
7	MF	JPN	Takuji Yonemoto
8	MF	JPN	Aria Jasuru Hasegawa
10	MF	JPN	Yohei Kajiyama
11	FW	JPN	Kazuma Watanabe
13	FW	JPN	Sōta Hirayama
14	MF	JPN	Hokuto Nakamura
15	DF	JPN	Daishi Hiramatsu
16	DF	JPN	Yuichi Maruyama
17	MF	JPN	Hiroki Kawano
18	MF	JPN	Naohiro Ishikawa

No.	Pos.	Nation	Player
19	MF	JPN	Yohei Otake
20	GK	JPN	Shuichi Gonda
21	GK	JPN	Ryotaro Hironaga
22	MF	JPN	Naotake Hanyu
23	FW	JPN	Yohei Hayashi
24	FW	JPN	Kentaro Shigematsu
27	MF	JPN	Sotan Tanabe
28	MF	JPN	Shuto Kono
29	DF	JPN	Kazunori Yoshimoto
30	DF	KOR	Jang Hyun-Soo
31	GK	JPN	Satoshi Tokizawa
33	DF	JPN	Kenta Mukuhara
35	MF	JPN	Kohei Shimoda
37	MF	JPN	Kento Hashimoto
39	MF	JPN	Tatsuya Yazawa
49	FW	BRA	Lucas Severino

== Match stats ==
- Updated to 30 May 2012

No.	Pos.	Player	Goal					Yellow card					(yellow card) (yellow-red card)					Red card				
No.	Pos.	Player	JL	EC	LC	ACL	SC	JL	EC	LC	ACL	SC	JL	EC	LC	ACL	SC	JL	EC	LC	ACL	SC
1	GK	(Japan) Hitoshi Shiota						1														
2	DF	(Japan) Yuhei Tokunaga				1		1														
3	DF	(Japan) Masato Morishige	2								1											
4	DF	(Japan) Hideto Takahashi				1		2			2											
6	DF	(Japan) Kosuke Ota						2														
8	MF	(Japan) Aria Jasuru Hasegawa	1			2	1	2			1		2									
10	MF	(Japan) Yohei Kajiyama	2			1																
11	FW	(Japan) Kazuma Watanabe	4			3																
18	MF	(Japan) Naohiro Ishikawa	3					1														
19	MF	(Japan) Yohei Otake				1		1			1											
20	GK	(Japan) Shuichi Gonda						1														
27	MF	(Japan) Sotan Tanabe	1								1											
30	DF	(South Korea) Jang Hyun-Soo						1														
33	DF	(Japan) Kenta Mukuhara				1		1														
39	MF	(Japan) Tatsuya Yazawa	1			2		2				1										
49	GK	(Brazil) Dominik Markovič	1					3														

== Match results ==
=== Pre-season ===
==== Friendly matches ====
19 February 2012	Kawasaki Frontale (Japan)	2 – 2	(Japan) FC Tokyo	(Japan) Miyazaki
			23' Kawano; 59' Yazawa

21 February 2012	FC Tokyo (Japan)	3 – 2	(South Korea) FC Seoul	(Japan) Tokyo
	Mukuhara 17'; Yazawa 37'; Shigematsu 81'		Molina; Hyun Young-Min	Stadium: Ajinomoto Stadium

23 February 2012	FC Tokyo (Japan)	2 – 1 (a.e.t.)	(Japan) Giravanz Kitakyushu	(Japan) Tokyo
	Otake 67'; Lucas 100'			Stadium: Ajinomoto Stadium

25 February 2012	FC Tokyo (Japan)	2 – 2	(Japan) Shonan Bellmare	(Japan) Tokyo
				Stadium: Ajinomoto Stadium

=== Fuji Xerox Super Cup ===
==== Final ====
3 March 2012
13:35 JST

Kashiwa Reysol	2 – 1	FC Tokyo
Wagner 27'; Barada (yellow card) 39'; Leandro 45' (pen.)	(Report)	(yellow card) 50' Yazawa; 64' Aria

National Olympic Stadium, Tokyo
Attendance: 35,453
Referee: (Japan) Yuichi Nishimura

Kashiwa Reysol	FC Tokyo

KASHIWA REYSOL (4–4–2):
GK	21	(Japan) Takanori Sugeno
RB	4	(Japan) Hiroki Sakai
CB	5	(Japan) Tatsuya Masushima
CB	3	(Japan) Naoya Kondo
LB	22	(Japan) Wataru Hashimoto
RM	20	(Japan) Akimi Barada	(yellow card) 39'
LM	7	(Japan) Hidekazu Otani		(substituted off) 81'
RW	10	(Brazil) Leandro Domigues	45' (pen.)
LW	15	(Brazil) Jorge Wagner	27'
CF	18	(Japan) Junya Tanaka		(substituted off) 68'
CF	9	(Japan) Hideaki Kitajima		(substituted off) 68'
Substitutes:
GK	16	(Japan) Koji Inada
CM	17	(North Korea) An Yong-Hak		(substituted on) 81'
CB	6	(Japan) Daisuke Nasu
AM	8	(Japan) Masakatsu Sawa		(substituted on) 68'
RW	29	(Japan) Koki Mizuno
CF	19	(Japan) Masato Kudo
CF	25	(Brazil) Ricardo Lobo		(substituted on) 68'
Manager:
(Brazil) Nelsinho Baptista

FC TOKYO (4-2-3-1):
GK	1	(Japan) Hitoshi Shiota
RB	33	(Japan) Kenta Mukuhara
CB	2	(Japan) Yuhei Tokunaga
CB	3	(Japan) Masato Morishige
LB	6	(Japan) Kosuke Ota
RM	10	(Japan) Yohei Kajiyama
LM	8	(Japan) Aria Jasuru Hasegawa	64'
RW	4	(Japan) Hideto Takahashi		(substituted off) 84'
AM	18	(Japan) Naohiro Ishikawa		(substituted off) 57'
LW	39	(Japan) Tatsuya Yazawa	(yellow card) 50'	(substituted off) 72'
CF	49	(Brazil) Lucas Severino
Substitutes:
GK	20	(Japan) Shuichi Gonda
CB	5	(Japan) Kenichi Kaga
RW	17	(Japan) Hiroki Kawano		(substituted on) 84'
AM	22	(Japan) Naotake Hanyu		(substituted on) 72'
CM	27	(Japan) Sotan Tanabe
CF	11	(Japan) Kazuma Watanabe		(substituted on) 57'
CF	13	(Japan) Sōta Hirayama
Manager:
(Serbia) Ranko Popović

Man of the Match:
(Brazil) Leandro Domingues (Kashiwa Reysol)

Assistant referees:
(Japan) Toshiyuki Nagi
(Japan) Akane Yagi
Fourth official:
(Japan) Hiroyuki Kimura

=== J.League ===
Matchday	1	2	3	4	5	6	7	8	10	11	12	13	14	15	9	16	17	18	19	20	21	22	23	24	25	26	27	28	29	30	31	32	33	34
Against	OMI	NAG	VIS	SAN	KAW	KAS	VEG	SHI	ALB	CON	SAG	URA	YOK	CER	KSR	JÚB	GAM	SAG	ALB	URA	KSR	OMI	SAN	YOK	SHI	KAW	JÚB	KAS	CER	CON	NAG	VIS	GAM	VEG
Venue	A	H	A	H	A	H	A	H	A	A	H	H	A	H	H	A	H	A	H	A	A	H	A	H	A	H	H	A	A	H	A	H	A	H
Position	2	3	2	3	3	5	8	9	8	6	6	6	7																					

Win Draw Lost

		All							Home							Away						
		Pts	W	D	L	F	A	Dif.	Pts	W	D	L	F	A	Dif.	Pts	W	D	L	F	A	Dif.
6	FC Tokyo	21	7	0	4	14	12	+2	6	2	0	3	7	8	–1	15	5	0	1	7	4	+3

J.League Winner (also qualified for 2013 AFC Champions League Group Stage)
2013 AFC Champions League Group Stage
Relegation to J.League 2

10 March 2012 1	Omiya Ardija	0 – 1	FC Tokyo	Saitama
19:00 JST		(Report)	61' Lucas	Stadium: NACK5 Stadium; Attendance: 11,437; Referee: Junpei Iida

17 March 2012 2	FC Tokyo	3 – 2	Nagoya Grampus	Tokyo
19:00 JST	Ishikawa 59', 73'; Aria 67'; Gonda (yellow card) 90+1'	(Report)	(yellow card) 13' H. Tanaka; (yellow card) 34' Yoshimura; 36' Tamada; (yellow card) 84' Daniel; 87' Nagai; (red card) 90+3' Córdoba	Stadium: Ajinomoto Stadium; Attendance: 21,757; Referee: Shinji Murakami

24 March 2012 3	Vissel Kobe	0 – 2	FC Tokyo	Kobe
14:00 JST	Tokura (yellow card) 69'	(Report)	32' Ishikawa; (yellow card) 56' (yellow-red card) 86' Aria; 90+6' Watanabe	Stadium: Home's Stadium Kobe; Attendance: 11,839; Referee: Yudai Yamamoto

31 March 2012 4	FC Tokyo	0 – 1	Sanfrecce Hiroshima	Tokyo
14:00 JST	Yazawa (yellow card) 10'; Tokunaga (yellow card) 61'; Lucas (yellow card) 81'; Ishikawa (yellow card) 89'	(Report)	(yellow card) 31' Morisaki; 56' Satō	Stadium: Ajinomoto Stadium; Attendance: 16,229; Referee: Ryuji Sato

8 April 2012 5	Kawasaki Frontale	0 – 1	FC Tokyo	Kawasaki
16:00 JST	Renato (yellow card) 50'	(Report)	(yellow card) 43' (yellow-red card) 48' Aria; (yellow card) 45+2' Takahashi; 87' Morishige	Stadium: Todoroki Athletics Stadium; Attendance: 20,996; Referee: Kenji Ogiya

14 April 2012 6	FC Tokyo	1 – 2	Kashima Antlers	Tokyo
13:00 JST	Yazawa (yellow card) 45+8'; Shiota (yellow card) 58'; Tanabe 84'	(Report)	(yellow card) 40' Umebachi; (yellow card) 45', (goal) 66' Koroki; (yellow card) 78' Osako; (yellow card) 81' Iwamasa; (yellow card) 83' Ogasawara; (yellow card) 84' Juninho; 90+4' Y. Endo; (yellow card) 90+7' Masuda	Stadium: Ajinomoto Stadium; Attendance: 19,279; Referee: Toshimitsu Yoshida

21 April 2012 7	Vegalta Sendai	4 – 0	FC Tokyo	Sendai
19:00 JST	Kakuda (yellow card) 20'; Kamata (yellow card) 37'; Akamine 45+3'; Uemoto (yellow card) 53'; Sekiguchi 58'; Wilson (yellow card) 75'; Y. Ota 76'; Kamata 87'	(Report)	(yellow card) 45+2' Otake; (yellow card) 50' Ota; (yellow card) 72' Lucas	Stadium: Yurtec Stadium Sendai; Attendance: 17,192; Referee: Minoru Tojo

28 April 2012 8	FC Tokyo	0 – 1	Shimizu S-Pulse	Tokyo
13:00 JST	Takahashi (yellow card) 50'	(Report)	(yellow card) 5' (yellow-red card) 56' França; (yellow card) 24' (yellow-red card) 73' Brosque; (yellow card) 45+1' Jong-a-Pin; (yellow card) 49' Ono; (yellow card) 53' Ki-Je; (yellow card) 65' Yoshida; 77' Takagi	Stadium: Ajinomoto Stadium; Attendance: 22,405; Referee: Yuichi Nishimura

6 May 2012 10	Albirex Niigata	0 – 2	FC Tokyo	Niigata
19:00 JST	Kim (yellow card) 83'	(Report)	(yellow card) 47' Mukuhara; 51' Kajiyama; 71' Yazawa	Stadium: Tohoku Denryoku Big Swan Stadium; Attendance: 21,827; Referee: Nobutsugu Murakami

12 May 2012 11	Consadole Sapporo	0 – 1	FC Tokyo	Sapporo
13:00 JST	Kawai (yellow card) 75'	(Report)	1' Kajiyama; (yellow card) 45' Ota; (yellow card) 48' Lucas	Stadium: Sapporo Dome; Attendance: 10,816; Referee: Hajime Matsuo

20 May 2012 12	FC Tokyo	3 – 2	Sagan Tosu	Tokyo
15:00 JST	Watanabe 75', 81', 88'	(Report)	(yellow card) 13' Okamoto; 42' Mizunuma; 59' Toyoda; (yellow card) 87' T. Kobayashi	Stadium: Ajinomoto Stadium; Attendance: 25,803; Referee: Kazuhiko Matsumura

26 May 2012 13	FC Tokyo	1 – 1	Urawa Red Diamonds	Tokyo
19:00 JST	Jang Hyun-Soo (yellow card) 33'; Morishige 90+1'	(Report)	88' Marcio	Stadium: Ajinomoto Stadium; Attendance: 33,836; Referee: Toshimitsu Yoshida

16 June 2012 14	Yokohama F. Marinos	1 – 0	FC Tokyo	Yokohama
19:00 JST	Hyodo 32'; Nakamura (yellow card) 39'; Saito (yellow card) 77'	Report		Stadium: Nissan Stadium; Attendance: 23,273; Referee: Masaaki Toma

23 June 2012 15	FC Tokyo	2 – 0	Cerezo Osaka	Tokyo
18:00 JST	Hasegawa 60'; Lucas 76'	Report		Stadium: Ajinomoto Stadium; Attendance: 22,685; Referee: Hiroyoshi Takayama

27 June 2012 9	FC Tokyo	0 – 1	Kashiwa Reysol	Tokyo
19:00 JST	Yonemoto (yellow card) 54'	Report	45+1' Masushima; (yellow card) 60' Jorge Wagner	Stadium: National Olympic Stadium; Attendance: 25,813; Referee: Nobutsugu Murakami

30 June 2012 16	Júbilo Iwata	3 – 1	FC Tokyo	Iwata
19:00 JST	Yamamoto 6'; Suganuma (yellow card) 55'; Miyazaki 70'; Cho 84'; Oshitani (yellow card) 88'	Report	89' Kawano	Stadium: Yamaha Stadium; Attendance: 13,923; Referee: Minoru Tōjō

7 July 2012 17	FC Tokyo	3 – 2	Gamba Osaka	Ajinomoto Stadium
Saturday 19:30 JST	Nakamura 3'; Lucas 17', 44'; Gonda (yellow card) 30'	Report	31' (pen.) Endō; (yellow card) 35' Takei; (yellow card) 59' Kim; 62' (yellow card) 77' Sato; (yellow card) 67' Abe	Attendance: 24,633; Referee: Jumpei Iida

14 July 2012 18	Sagan Tosu	1 – 0	FC Tokyo	Tosu
19:00 JST	Ikeda (yellow card) 24'; Kim Kun-Hoan (yellow card) 52'; Tozin 87'	Report	Takahashi (yellow card) 34'; Hasegawa (yellow card) 51'; Morishige (yellow card) 65'; Tokunaga (yellow card) 82'	Stadium: Best Amenity Stadium; Attendance: 13,891; Referee: (Japan) Yoshiro Imamura

28 July 2012 19	FC Tokyo	0 – 2	Albirex Niigata	Tokyo
18:30 JST		Report	Mikado 32'; Alan Mineiro 67'; Michael (yellow card) 85'	Stadium: Ajinomoto Stadium; Attendance: 23,430; Referee: (Japan) Tomoya Maeda

4 August 2012 20	Urawa Red Diamonds	2 – 2	FC Tokyo	Saitama
19:00 JST	Ugajin 12'; Marcio Richardes 36'	Report	Mukuhara (yellow card) 3' (goal) 60'; Takahashi (yellow card) 63'; Hasegawa 72'; Kaga (yellow card) 81'	Stadium: Saitama Stadium 2002; Attendance: 34,267; Referee: (Japan) Nobutsugu Murakami

11 August 2012 21	Kashiwa Reysol	1 – 1	FC Tokyo	Kashiwa
20:00 JST	Fujita (yellow card) 10'; Leandro Domingues (yellow card) 44'; Jorge Wagner 67'	Report	Lucas Severino 11' (pen.); Hasegawa (yellow card) 35'; Kaga (yellow card) 52' (yellow-red card) 72'; Yazawa (yellow card) 90+3'	Stadium: Hitachi Kashiwa Soccer Stadium; Attendance: 13,478; Referee: (Japan) Ryuji Sato

18 August 2012 22	FC Tokyo	0 – 1	Omiya Ardija	Tokyo
19:30 JST	Hasegawa (yellow card) 56'	Report	Higashi (yellow card) 33'; Novaković 78'	Stadium: Ajinomoto Stadium; Attendance: 18,342; Referee: (Japan) Futoshi Nakamura

25 August 2012 23	Sanfrecce Hiroshima	0 – 1	FC Tokyo	Hiroshima
20:00 JST		Report	Lucas Severino 46'	Stadium: Hiroshima Big Arch; Attendance: 23,656; Referee: (Japan) Tomoya Maeda

1 September 2012 24	FC Tokyo	3 – 1	Yokohama F. Marinos	Tokyo
19:30 JST	Tanabe 36'; Lucas Severino 42', 71'; Hasegawa (yellow card) 90+2'	Summary	Nakazawa (yellow card) 14'; Nakamachi (yellow card) 27'; Hyodo 66' (yellow card) 70'	Stadium: Ajinomoto Stadium; Attendance: 26,950; Referee: (Japan) Nobutsugu Murakami

15 September 2012 25	Shimizu S-Pulse	1 – 1	FC Tokyo	Shimizu-ku
20:00	Omae 41'; Jong-a-Pin (yellow card) 63'; Hattanda (yellow card) 72'	Summary	Kaga (yellow card) 12'; Vučićević 59'; Gonda (yellow card) 70'	Stadium: Outsourcing Stadium Nihondaira; Attendance: 13,714; Referee: (Japan) Masaaki Iemoto

22 September 2012 26	FC Tokyo	1 – 2	Kawasaki Frontale	Tokyo
20:00 JST	Morishige (yellow card) 53'; Edmilson (yellow card) 85' (goal) 88'; Vučićević (yellow card) 86'	Summary	Kazama (yellow card) 3'; Kusukami 46' (yellow card) 51'; Jeci 54'; Sugiyama (yellow card) 88'	Stadium: Ajinomoto Stadium; Attendance: 34,822; Referee: (Japan) Hajime Matsuo

29 September 2012 27	FC Tokyo	2 – 1	Júbilo Iwata	Tokyo
15:00 JST	Edmilson 54'; Vučićević 85'	Summary	Suganuma 9'; Hatta (yellow card) 77'	Stadium: Ajinomoto Stadium; Attendance: 22,165; Referee: (Japan) Ryuji Sato

6 October 2012 28	Kashima Antlers	5 – 1	FC Tokyo	Kashima
16:00 JST	Dutra 18', 71', 87'; Shibasaki 38'; Endo 69'	Summary	Takahashi 83'	Stadium: Kashima Soccer Stadium; Attendance: 15,118; Referee: (Japan) Takuto Okabe

20 October 2012 29	Cerezo Osaka	1 – 1	FC Tokyo	Osaka
19:00 JST	Maruhashi 50'	Summary	Hasegawa (yellow card) 54' (yellow-red card) 90+3'; Yonemoto (yellow card) 70'; Vučićević 74'	Stadium: Nagai Ball Gall Field; Attendance: 14,268; Referee: (Japan) Tomoya Maeda

27 October 2012 30	FC Tokyo	v	Consadole Sapporo	Tokyo
				Stadium: Ajinomoto Stadium

7 November 2012 31	Nagoya Grampus	v	FC Tokyo	Nagoya
				Stadium: Mizuho Athletic Stadium

17 November 2012 32	FC Tokyo	v	Vissel Kobe	Tokyo
				Stadium: Ajinomoto Stadium

24 November 2012 33	Gamba Osaka	v	FC Tokyo	Osaka
				Stadium: Osaka Expo '70 Stadium

1 December 2012 34	FC Tokyo	v	Vegalta Sendai	Tokyo
				Stadium: Ajinomoto Stadium

=== AFC Champions League ===
==== Group stage ====
Pos	Team	Pld	W	D	L	GF	GA	GD	Pts	Qualification	ULS	TOK	BBR	BEG
1	(South Korea) Ulsan Hyundai	6	4	2	0	11	7	+4	14	Advance to knockout stage	—	1–0	1–1	2–1
2	(Japan) FC Tokyo	6	3	2	1	12	6	+6	11	Advance to knockout stage	2–2	—	4–2	3–0
3	(Australia) Brisbane Roar	6	0	3	3	6	11	−5	3 (Note: Brisbane Roar and Beijing Guoan are tied on their head-to-head record (2 pts, 0 GD, 2 GF), overall goal difference and overall goals scored, and so are ranked by their fair play record (Brisbane Roar: 12 pts; Beijing Guoan: 18 pts).)		1–2	0–2	—	1–1
4	(China) Beijing Guoan	6	0	3	3	6	11	−5	3		2–3	1–1	1–1	—

Source: WorldFootball.net
Notes:

6 March 2012 1	Brisbane Roar (Australia)	0 – 2	(Japan) FC Tokyo	(Australia) Brisbane
18:30 JST; 19:30 Local time	Franjic (yellow card) 68'; Stefanutto (yellow card) 73'; Adnan (yellow card) 85'	(Report)	45+1' Yazawa; 55' Aria	Stadium: Suncorp Stadium; Attendance: 12,037; Referee: (Uzbekistan) Valentin Kovalenko

20 March 2012 2	FC Tokyo (Japan)	2 – 2	(South Korea) Ulsan Hyundai	(Japan) Tokyo
14:00 JST	Tokunaga 37'; Takahashi (yellow card) 39'; Kajiyama 83'	(Report)	(yellow card) 39' Lee Ho; (yellow card) 53' Kang Min-Soo; 80' Kim Seung-Yong; 88' Maranhão	Stadium: National Olympic Stadium; Attendance: 14,110; Referee: (Uzbekistan) Ravshan Irmatov

4 April 2012 3	Beijing Guoan (China)	1 – 1	(Japan) FC Tokyo	(China) Beijing
21:00 JST; 20:00 Local time	Xiaolong 10' (pen.); Yunlong (yellow card) 37'; Yang (yellow card) 39'	(Report)	(yellow card) 10' Takahashi; 44', (yellow card) 87' Aria	Stadium: Workers Stadium; Attendance: 31,256; Referee: (Iran) Saeid Mozaffarizadeh

17 April 2012 4	FC Tokyo (Japan)	3 – 0	(China) Beijing Guoan	(Japan) Tokyo
19:30 JST	Watanabe 7'; Otake 45+1'; Yazawa 57'; Tanabe (yellow card) 62'; Otake (yellow card) 81'	(Report)	(yellow card) 21' Xiaolong; (yellow card) 35' Matić; (yellow card) 90+3' Xiaobin	Stadium: Ajinomoto Stadium; Attendance: 9,537; Referee: (Bahrain) Ali Abdulnabi

2 May 2012 5	FC Tokyo (Japan)	4 – 2	(Australia) Brisbane Roar	(Japan) Tokyo
19:30 JST	Takahashi 5'; Mukuhara 20'; Watanabe 44' (pen.), 60'	(Report)	4' Berisha; 33' Broich	Stadium: National Olympic Stadium; Attendance: 8,492; Referee: (Qatar) Abdullah Balideh

16 May 2012 6	Ulsan Hyundai (South Korea)	1 – 0	(Japan) FC Tokyo	(South Korea) Ulsan
19:30 JST	Kim Young-Sam (yellow card) 6'; Kang Min-Soo 37'	(Report)		Stadium: Ulsan Munsu; Attendance: 5,746; Referee: (Saudi Arabia) Khalil Al Ghamdi

==== Round of 16 ====
30 May 2012	Guangzhou Evergrande (China)	1 – 0	(Japan) FC Tokyo	(China) Guangzhou
20:00 Local time 21:00 JST	Cléo 31'; Zhang Linpeng (yellow card) 69'; Zhao Xuri (yellow card) 83'		(yellow card) 61' Morishige	Stadium: Tianhe Stadium; Referee: (Qatar) Abdullah Al-Bloushi

=== Emperor's Cup ===
==== Round of 64 ====
9 September 2012 Round 2	F.C. Tokyo	0 – 1	Yokogawa Musashino	Chōfu, Tokyo
13:00		Report	Keisuke Iwata 90+2'	Stadium: Ajinomoto Stadium; Attendance: 7,287; Referee: Tetsuro Yoshida

=== J.League Cup ===
==== Quarterfinals ====
25 July 2012 First leg	Vegalta Sendai	2 – 2	FC Tokyo	Sendai
19:04	Tamura 32', (yellow card) 42'; Kamata (yellow card) 44'; Wilson 50'; Watanabe (yellow card) 59'	(Report)	16' Watanabe; 30' Ishikawa; (yellow card) 90+1' Kaga	Stadium: Yurtec Stadium Sendai; Attendance: 8,873; Referee: (England) Darren Deadman

8 August 2012 Second leg	FC Tokyo	2 – 0 (4 – 2 agg.)	Vegalta Sendai	Tokyo
20:00	Tanabe (yellow card) 30'; Yazawa (yellow card) 42'; Ishikawa 81'; Watanabe 90+3'	Report	Wilson (yellow card) 37'; Uchiyama (yellow card) 51'; Kamata (yellow card) 62'; Park Ju-Sung (yellow card) 73'	Stadium: Ajinomoto Stadium; Attendance: 10,573; Referee: (Japan) Kenji Ogiya

==== Semifinals ====
5 September 2012 First leg	FC Tokyo	2 – 1	Shimizu S-Pulse	Tokyo
20:00	Kajiyama 35'; Tanabe (yellow card) 62'; Lucas Severino 80' (pen.)	Summary	Hiraoka 23'; Muramatsu (yellow card) 40'; Kim Hyun-Sung (yellow card) 53'; Lee Ki-Je (yellow card) 75'; Kawai (yellow card) 78'; Sugiyama (yellow card) 90+2'	Stadium: Ajinomoto Stadium; Attendance: 10,347; Referee: (Japan) Toshimitsu Yoshida

13 October 2012 Second leg	Shimizu S-Pulse	3 – 0 (4 – 2 agg.)	FC Tokyo	Shimizu, Shizuoka
15:00	Omae 26', 63', 90+6'; Sugiyama (yellow card) 58'; Hayashi (yellow card) 74'; Jong-a-Pin (yellow card) 90'	Summary	Edmilson (yellow card) 18'; Mukuhara (yellow card) 49'; Tokunaga (yellow card) 88'; Morishige (red card) 90+6'	Stadium: Outsourcing Stadium Nihondaira; Attendance: 12,155; Referee: (Japan) Kenji Ogiya

=== Goals ===
R	Player	Position	J.League	AFC Champions League	Fuji Xerox Super Cup	Emperor's Cup	J.League Cup	Total
1	(Japan) Kazuma Watanabe	FW	4	3	0	0	1	8
2	(Japan) Aria	MF	2	2	1	0	0	5
3	(Japan) Naohiro Ishikawa	MF	3	0	0	0	1	4
3	(Brazil) Lucas Severino	FW	4	0	0	0	0	4
4	(Japan) Tatsuya Yazawa	MF	1	2	0	0	0	3
4	(Japan) Yohei Kajiyama	MF	2	1	0	0	0	3
5	(Japan) Masato Morishige	DF	2	0	0	0	0	2
6	(Japan) Sotan Tanabe	MF	1	0	0	0	0	1
6	(Japan) Hiroki Kawano	MF	1	0	0	0	0	1
6	(Japan) Hokuto Nakamura	MF	1	0	0	0	0	1
6	(Japan) Yuhei Tokunaga	MF	0	1	0	0	0	1
6	(Japan) Yohei Otake	MF	0	1	0	0	0	1
6	(Japan) Kenta Mukuhara	DF	0	1	0	0	0	1
6	(Japan) Hideto Takahashi	DF	0	1	0	0	0	1

Last updated: 13 May 2012
Source: Match reports in Competitive matches

== Kits ==
Home	Home AFC CL	Away	Away AFC CL
