= 2011 FC Tokyo season =

F.C. Tokyo
2011 season
- Manager: Kiyoshi Okuma
- J. League Division 2: Champions
- Emperor's Cup: Champions
Home colours	Away colours

The 2011 F.C. Tokyo season was F.C. Tokyo's first season in J. League Division 2 since 1999. F.C. Tokyo won promotion back into the 2012 J. League Division 1, F.C. Tokyo also won the 2011 Emperor's Cup.

== Players ==
=== Current squad ===
As of July 17, 2010 Note: Flags indicate national team as defined under FIFA eligibility rules; some limited exceptions apply. Players may hold more than one non-FIFA nationality.

No.	Pos.	Nation	Player
1	GK	JPN	Hitoshi Shiota
2	DF	JPN	Yuhei Tokunaga
3	DF	JPN	Masato Morishige
4	DF	JPN	Hideto Takahashi
6	DF	JPN	Yasuyuki Konno
7	MF	JPN	Takuji Yonemoto
9	FW	BRA	Roberto César
10	MF	JPN	Yohei Kajiyama
11	FW	JPN	Tatsuya Suzuki
13	FW	JPN	Sōta Hirayama
14	MF	JPN	Hokuto Nakamura
15	DF	JPN	Daishi Hiramatsu
16	MF	BRA	Roberto
17	FW	BRA	Pedro Júnior
18	MF	JPN	Naohiro Ishikawa

No.	Pos.	Nation	Player
19	MF	JPN	Yohei Otake
20	GK	JPN	Shuichi Gonda
21	GK	JPN	Ryotaro Hironaga
22	MF	JPN	Naotake Hanyu
26	DF	JPN	Takumi Abe
27	MF	JPN	Sotan Tanabe
29	DF	JPN	Kazunori Yoshimoto
30	FW	JPN	Daiki Takamatsu
31	GK	JPN	Satoshi Tokizawa
32	MF	JPN	Kazumasa Uesato
33	DF	JPN	Kenta Mukuhara
34	DF	JPN	Tomokazu Nagira
35	MF	JPN	Kohei Shimoda
39	MF	JPN	Tatsuya Yazawa

=== Out on loan ===
Note: Flags indicate national team as defined under FIFA eligibility rules; some limited exceptions apply. Players may hold more than one non-FIFA nationality.

No.	Pos.	Nation	Player
—	DF	JPN	Ryo Hiraide (to Kataller Toyama)
—	MF	JPN	Toshihiro Matsushita (to Vegalta Sendai)
—	MF	JPN	Kota Morimura (to Giravanz Kitakyushu)
—	MF	JPN	Shuto Kono (to Oita Trinita)
—	FW	JPN	Kentaro Shigematsu (to Avispa Fukuoka)

=== 2011 season transfers ===
In Note: Flags indicate national team as defined under FIFA eligibility rules; some limited exceptions apply. Players may hold more than one non-FIFA nationality.

No.	Pos.	Nation	Player
9	FW	BRA	Roberto César (Transferred from Avaí)
16	MF	BRA	Roberto (Transferred from Yokohama F.C.)
17	FW	BRA	Pedro Júnior (Loan from Gamba Osaka)
21	GK	JPN	Ryotaro Hironaga (Loan return from Fagiano Okayama)
26	DF	JPN	Takumi Abe (Loan return from Yokohama FC)
29	DF	JPN	Kazunori Yoshimoto (Loan return from F.C. Gifu)
30	FW	JPN	Daiki Takamatsu (Loan from Oita Trinita)
31	GK	JPN	Satoshi Tokizawa (Transferred from Thespa Kusatsu)
32	MF	JPN	Kazumasa Uesato (Loan from Consadole Sapporo)
34	DF	JPN	Tomokazu Nagira (Transferred from Avispa Fukuoka)
35	MF	JPN	Kohei Shimoda (Loan return from Mito HollyHock)
39	MF	JPN	Tatsuya Yazawa (Transferred from JEF United Ichihara Chiba)
—	MF	JPN	Kota Morimura (Loan return from Mito HollyHock)

Out Note: Flags indicate national team as defined under FIFA eligibility rules; some limited exceptions apply. Players may hold more than one non-FIFA nationality.

No.	Pos.	Nation	Player
8	MF	JPN	Toshihiro Matsushita (Loan to Vegalta Sendai)
16	FW	BRA	Ricardinho (Loan return to Atlético-PR)
17	DF	KOR	Kim Young-Gwon (Transferred to Omiya Ardija)
21	GK	JPN	Nobuyuki Abe (Transferred to Shonan Bellmare)
24	FW	JPN	Kentaro Shigematsu (Loan to Avispa Fukuoka)
25	DF	JPN	Ryo Hiraide (Loan to Kataller Toyama)
28	MF	JPN	Shuto Kono (Loan to Oita Trinita)
30	MF	KOR	Seo Yong-Duk (Loan return to Omiya Ardija)
32	FW	JPN	Shunsuke Maeda (Loan return to Oita Trinita)
39	FW	JPN	Masashi Oguro (Loan return to Tokyo Verdy)
—	DF	JPN	Yuto Nagatomo (Transferred to A.C. Cesena)
—	MF	JPN	Kota Morimura (Loan to Giravanz Kitakyushu)
—	FW	JPN	Shingo Akamine (Transferred to Vegalta Sendai)

== Competitions ==
=== J. League ===
==== League table ====
Pos	Team	Pld	W	D	L	GF	GA	GD	Pts	Promotion or relegation
1	FC Tokyo (C, P)	38	23	8	7	67	22	+45	77	Promotion to 2012 J.League Division 1 and Qualification to 2012 Champions League (Note: FC Tokyo, as winners of the 2011 Emperor's Cup, also qualified for the group stage of the 2012 AFC Champions League)
2	Sagan Tosu (P)	38	19	12	7	68	34	+34	69	Promotion to 2012 J.League Division 1
3	Consadole Sapporo (P)	38	21	5	12	49	32	+17	68	Promotion to 2012 J.League Division 1
4	Tokushima Vortis	38	19	8	11	51	38	+13	65	
5	Tokyo Verdy	38	16	11	11	69	45	+24	59	

Updated to match(es) played on December 3, 2011. Source: J.League Division 2
Rules for classification: 1st points; 2nd goal differential; 3rd goals scored; 4th head-to-head results; 5th disciplinary points; 6th draw. If two clubs are tied for first place, both clubs will be declared champions.
(C) Champions; (P) Promoted

==== Results summary ====
5 March 2011 Round 1	F.C. Tokyo	1 - 0	Sagan Tosu	Ajinomoto Stadium
Saturday 14:00	Yazawa 61'	Report		Attendance: 21,408; Referee: Kenji Ogiya

29 June 2011 Round 2	Fagiano Okayama	0 - 2	F.C. Tokyo	Momotaro Stadium
Wednesday 19:30		Report	Morishige 40'; Takahashi 75'	Attendance: 8,403; Referee: Yoshiro Imamura

7 August 2011 Round 3	F.C. Gifu	0 - 2	F.C. Tokyo	Nagaragawa Stadium
Sunday 18:00		Report	Tokunaga 17'; Yazawa 42'	Attendance: 6,684; Referee: Minoru Tojo

4 September 2011 Round 4	F.C. Tokyo	0 - 0	Tochigi S.C.	Kumagaya Athletic Stadium
Sunday 18:00		Report		Attendance: 6,795; Referee: Kazuyuki Hayakawa

28 September 2011 Round 5	F.C. Tokyo	2 - 0	Giravanz Kitakyushu	Ajinomoto Stadium
Wednesday 19:00	Mukuhara 47'; Lucas 75'	Report		Attendance: 10,229; Referee: Takuto Okabe

19 October 2011 Round 6	Yokohama F.C.	0 - 1	F.C. Tokyo	Mitsuzawa Stadium
Wednesday 19:00		Report	Ishikawa 90+5'	Attendance: 6,230; Referee: Koichiro Fukushima

26 October 2011 Round 7	F.C. Tokyo	1 - 2	Oita Trinita	Ajinomoto Stadium
Wednesday 19:00	Own Goal 22'	Report	Maeda 45+1'; Hasegawa 90+4'	Attendance: 10,660; Referee: Ryuji Sato

24 April 2011 Round 8	JEF United Chiba	3 - 0	F.C. Tokyo	Fukuda Denshi Arena
Sunday 14:00	Aarøy 77'; Yonekura 83'; Aarøy 89'	Report		Attendance: 16,360; Referee: Futoshi Nakamura

30 April 2011 Round 9	F.C. Tokyo	0 - 0	Consadole Sapporo	Ajinomoto Stadium
Saturday 13:00		Report		Attendance: 17,572; Referee: Nobutsugu Murakami

4 May 2011 Round 10	Tokyo Verdy	0 - 0	F.C. Tokyo	Ajinomoto Stadium
Wednesday 15:00		Report		Attendance: 28,832; Referee: Jumpei Iida

8 May 2011 Round 11	F.C. Tokyo	1 - 0	Kataller Toyama	Ajinomoto Stadium
Sunday 16:00	Hanyu 81'	Report		Attendance: 14,174; Referee: Koichiro Fukushima

14 May 2011 Round 12	Thespa Kusatsu	2 - 1	F.C. Tokyo	Shikishima Stadium
Saturday 16:00	Rafinha 31', 66'	Report	Kajiyama 28'	Attendance: 6,520; Referee: Takuto Okabe

22 May 2011 Round 13	F.C. Tokyo	1 - 1	Shonan Bellmare	Ajinomoto Stadium
Sunday 16:00	Roberto César 1'	Report	Nakamura 78'	Attendance: 15,423; Referee: Toshimitsu Yoshida

28 May 2011 Round 14	Kyoto Sanga F.C.	1 - 4	F.C. Tokyo	Nishikyogoku Athletic Stadium
Saturday 16:00	Naitoh 20'	Report	Kajiyama 14'; Tanabe 30', 58'; Otake 37'	Attendance: 5,330; Referee: Futoshi Nakamura

5 June 2011 Round 15	F.C. Tokyo	1 - 1	Ehime F.C.	Komazawa Olympic Park Stadium
Sunday 14:00	Tanabe 17'	Report	Ishii 63'	Attendance: 13,105; Referee: Hajime Matsuo

12 June 2011 Round 16	Roasso Kumamoto	0 - 1	F.C. Tokyo	KKWing Stadium
Sunday 19:00		Report	Roberto César 20'	Attendance: 5,204; Referee: Naohito Ogawa

19 June 2011 Round 17	F.C. Tokyo	1 - 0	Tokushima Vortis	Ajinomoto Stadium
Sunday 18:00	Kajiyama 45+1'	Report		Attendance: 14,530; Referee: Hiroyuki Onishi

25 June 2011 Round 18	Mito HollyHock	2 - 3	F.C. Tokyo	K's denki Stadium Mito
Saturday 16:00	Hozaki 66'; Murata 89'	Report	Morishige 54'; Kajiyama 60'; Ishikawa 79'	Attendance: 5,021; Referee: Hiroshi Yamauchi

2 July 2011 Round 19	F.C. Tokyo	3 - 0	Gainare Tottori	Ajinomoto Stadium
Saturday 18:30	Roberto César 59'; Takahashi 67'; Morishige 89'	Report		Attendance: 16,337; Referee: Tomohiro Tsukada

9 July 2011 Round 20	Oita Trinita	0 - 0	F.C. Tokyo	Ōita Stadium
Saturday 19:00		Report		Attendance: 27,519; Referee: Futoshi Nakamura

17 July 2011 Round 21	F.C. Tokyo	4 - 0	F.C. Gifu	Ajinomoto Stadium
Sunday 18:30	Tokunaga 22'; Tanabe 52'; Roberto César 75', 80'	Report		Attendance: 17,183; Referee: Yuki Noda

24 July 2011 Round 22	F.C. Tokyo	5 - 0	Roasso Kumamoto	National Stadium
Sunday 18:30	Roberto César 44'; Hanyu 48'; Yazawa 67'; Tokunaga 73'; Lucas 87'	Report		Attendance: 18,195; Referee: Robert Madley

30 July 2011 Round 23	Giravanz Kitakyushu	1 - 0	F.C. Tokyo	Honjō Athletic Stadium
Saturday 18:00		Report	Ikemoto 59'	Attendance: 6,909; Referee: Tetsuro Yoshida

13 August 2011 Round 24	F.C. Tokyo	1 - 0	Thespa Kusatsu	Ajinomoto Stadium
Saturday 18:30	Roberto César 69'	Report		Attendance: 20,790; Referee: Masaaki Iemoto

21 August 2011 Round 25	Tochigi S.C.	2 - 1	F.C. Tokyo	Tochigi Green Stadium
Sunday 18:00	Sabia 11'; Mizunuma 79'	Report	Suzuki 90+5'	Attendance: 9,953; Referee: Ryuji Sato

28 August 2011 Round 26	Kataller Toyama	1 - 0	F.C. Tokyo	Toyama Athletic Recreation Park Stadium
Sunday 18:00	Kurobe 34'	Report		Attendance: 8,663; Referee: Itaru Hirose

10 September 2011 Round 27	F.C. Tokyo	6 - 1	Kyoto Sanga F.C.	Ajinomoto Stadium
Saturday 18:30	Lucas 31', 57', 85'; Mukuhara 36'; Morishige 47'; Sakata 90+3'	Report	Miyayoshi 11'	Attendance: 15,517; Referee: Kenji Ogiya

17 September 2011 Round 28	Ehime F.C.	0 - 5	F.C. Tokyo	Ningineer Stadium
Saturday 18:00		Report	Tanabe 28'; Konno 45+2'; Hanyu 53'; Lucas 71'; Nagasato 84'	Attendance: 4,269; Referee: Takumi Shinoto

25 September 2011 Round 29	F.C. Tokyo	3 - 0	Yokohama F.C.	National Stadium
Sunday 15:00	Kajiyama 8'; Hanyu 66', 68'	Report		Attendance: 21,330; Referee: Futoshi Nakamura

2 October 2011 Round 30	Tokushima Vortis	0 - 2	F.C. Tokyo	Naruto Athletic Stadium
Sunday 16:00		Report	Nagasato 16'; Ishikawa 77'	Attendance: 9,118; Referee: Toshimitsu Yoshida

16 October 2011 Round 31	F.C. Tokyo	3 - 0	Fagiano Okayama	Ajinomoto Stadium
Sunday 13:00	Morishige 10'; Takahashi 35'; Kajiyama 41'	Report		Attendance: 17,384; Referee: Hiroshi Yamauchi

23 October 2011 Round 32	Sagan Tosu	0 - 0	F.C. Tokyo	Tosu Stadium
Sunday 17:00		Report		Attendance: 15,489; Referee: Hajime Matsuo

30 October 2011 Round 33	F.C. Tokyo	1 - 1	Tokyo Verdy	Ajinomoto Stadium
Sunday 13:00	Lucas 45+1'	Report	Own Goal 61'	Attendance: 35,911; Referee: Kazuyuki Hayakawa

6 November 2011 Round 34	Shonan Bellmare	1 - 2	F.C. Tokyo	Hiratsuka Athletics Stadium
Sunday 16:00	Adiel 75'	Report	Roberto César 72', 81'	Attendance: 9,292; Referee: Nobutsugu Murakami

12 November 2011 Round 35	F.C. Tokyo	2 - 0	Mito HollyHock	Ajinomoto Stadium
Saturday 16:00	Takahashi 49'; Roberto César 79'	Report		Attendance: 22,896; Referee: Tomohiro Inoue

19 November 2011 Round 36	Gainare Tottori	1 - 5	F.C. Tokyo	Tottori Soccer Stadium
Saturday 17:00	Fukui 85'	Report	Morishige 23'; Lucas 51'; Yazawa 70'; Suzuki 80'; Uesato 90+2'	Attendance: 5,746; Referee: Takuto Okabe

26 November 2011 Round 37	F.C. Tokyo	1 - 0	JEF United Chiba	Ajinomoto Stadium
Saturday 17:30	Lucas 77'	Report		Attendance: 24,241; Referee: Jumpei Iida

3 December 2011 Round 38	Consadole Sapporo	2 - 1	F.C. Tokyo	Sapporo Dome
Saturday 13:30	Uchimura 40', 45+2'	Report	Yazawa 80'	Attendance: 39,243; Referee: Hajime Matsuo

=== Results by round ===
Round	1	2	3	4	5	6	7	8	9	10	11	12	13	14	15	16	17	18	19	20	21	22	23	24	25	26	27	28	29	30	31	32	33	34	35	36	37	38
Ground	H	A	A	H	H	A	H	A	H	A	H	A	H	A	H	A	H	A	H	A	H	H	A	H	A	A	H	A	H	A	H	A	H	A	H	A	H	A
Result	W	W	W	D	W	W	L	L	D	D	W	L	D	W	D	W	W	W	W	D	W	W	L	W	L	L	W	W	W	W	W	D	D	W	W	W	W	L
Position	7	3	1	1	1	1	1	14	13	13	7	11	12	9	9	8	4	3	3	4	1	1	2	1	1	1	1	1	1	1	1	1	1	1	1	1	1	1

Updated to match(es) played on 03 December 2011. Source: "World-Football".
A = Away; H = Home; W = Win; D = Draw; L = Loss

=== Emperor's Cup ===
2011-10-08 Second round	FC Tokyo	4 – 0	F.C. Kagoshima	Ajinomoto Stadium, Chōfu
13:00	Yazawa 14', 90'; Morishige 30'; Lucas 76'	Report		Attendance: 5,301; Referee: Akihiko Ikeuchi

2011-11-16 Third round	FC Tokyo	2 – 1 (a.e.t.)	Vissel Kobe	Ajinomoto Stadium, Chōfu
19:00	Takahashi 13'; Morishige 120+1'	Report	Komoto 37'	Attendance: 5,937; Referee: Kenji Ogiya

2011-12-17 Fourth round	Mito HollyHock	0 – 1	FC Tokyo	K's denki Stadium Mito, Mito
13:00		Report	Shiotani 8' (o.g.)	Attendance: 6,242; Referee: Yoshiro Imamura

2011-12-24 Quarter-finals	FC Tokyo	1 – 0	Urawa Red Diamonds	Kumagaya Athletic Stadium, Kumagaya
13:00	Ishikawa 20'	Report		Attendance: 11,612; Referee: Kenji Ogiya

2011-12-29 Semi-finals	FC Tokyo	1 – 0	Cerezo Osaka	Nagai Stadium, Osaka
13:00	Yazawa 77'	Report		Attendance: 11,982; Referee: Masaaki Toma

2012-01-01 Final	Kyoto Sanga	2 – 4	FC Tokyo	National Olympic Stadium, Shinjuku
14:00	Nakayama 13'; Kubo 71'	Report	Konno 15'; Morishige 36'; Lucas 42', 66'	Attendance: 41,974; Referee: Yuichi Nishimura
