= 2010 FC Tokyo season =

FC Tokyo
2010 season
- Manager: Hiroshi Jofuku; Kiyoshi Okuma
- Stadium: Ajinomoto Stadium
- J.League 1: 16th
- Emperor's Cup: Semifinals
- J.League Cup: Quarterfinals
- Top goalscorer: Sōta Hirayama (7); Masashi Oguro (7)
Home colours	Away colours

The 2010 FC Tokyo season was the team's 12th as a member of J.League Division 1.

== Competitions ==
Competitions	Position
J.League 1	16th / 18 clubs
Emperor's Cup	Semifinals
J.League Cup	Quarterfinals

=== J. League 1 ===
Pos	Team	Pld	W	D	L	GF	GA	GD	Pts	Qualification or relegation
14	Vegalta Sendai	34	10	9	15	40	46	−6	39	
15	Vissel Kobe	34	9	11	14	37	45	−8	38	
16	FC Tokyo (R)	34	8	12	14	36	41	−5	36	Relegation to 2011 J.League Division 2
17	Kyoto Sanga (R)	34	4	7	23	30	60	−30	19	Relegation to 2011 J.League Division 2
18	Shonan Bellmare (R)	34	3	7	24	31	82	−51	16	Relegation to 2011 J.League Division 2

Updated to match(es) played on December 4, 2010. Source: J.League Division 1
Rules for classification: 1) points; 2) goal difference; 3) number of goals scored.
(R) Relegated

=== J. League Cup ===
Group A

Team	Pld	W	D	L	GF	GA	GD	Pts
F.C. Tokyo	6	4	1	1	7	4	+3	13
Vegalta Sendai	6	3	3	0	7	1	+6	12
Kyoto Sanga	6	3	2	1	9	5	+4	11
Albirex Niigata	6	3	1	2	5	5	0	10
Omiya Ardija	6	2	1	3	6	9	−3	7
Nagoya Grampus	6	0	3	3	4	9	−5	3
Cerezo Osaka	6	0	1	5	4	9	−5	1

31 March 2010 1	FC Tokyo	2–2	Nagoya Grampus	Tokyo
19:00	Kim Young-gwon (yellow card) 31'; Hiramatsu (yellow card) 48'; Morishige (yellow card) 58'; Hirayama 68'; Shigematsu 90+2'	Report	Kennedy (yellow card) 16' (goal) 30'; Chiyotanda 74'; Ogawa (yellow card) 86'	Stadium: National Stadium; Attendance: 12,291; Referee: Yudai Yamamoto

14 April 2010 2	Ōmiya Ardija	0–1	FC Tokyo	Ōmiya
19:03	Fukaya (yellow card) 71'	Report	Ricardinho (yellow card) 25' (goal) 39'; Kim Young-gwon (yellow card) 51'; Mukuhara (red card) 55'; Suzuki (yellow card) 79'	Stadium: NACK5 Stadium Omiya; Attendance: 6,598; Referee: Yoshiro Imamura

22 May 2010 3	FC Tokyo	1–0	Albirex Niigata	Setagaya, Tokyo
14:00	Matsushita (yellow card) 34'; Kajiyama (yellow card) 44'; Otake 90+4'	Report	Nagata (yellow card) 3'; Kobayashi (yellow card) 33'; Nishi (yellow card) 58'	Stadium: Komazawa Olympic Park Stadium; Attendance: 13,098; Referee: Yuichi Nishimura

26 May 2010 4	Vegalta Sendai	1–0	FC Tokyo	Sendai
19:00	Sekiguchi 5'; Ota (yellow card) 80'	Report		Stadium: Yurtec Stadium Sendai; Attendance: 9,157; Referee: Toshimitsu Yoshida

5	Bye

6 June 2010 6	FC Tokyo	1–0	Kyoto Sanga	Tokyo
15:00	Kim Young-gwon 53'; Matsushita (yellow card) 65'	Report	Kakuda (yellow card) 42'; Masushima (yellow card) 75'	Stadium: Ajinomoto Stadium; Attendance: 17,014; Referee: Masayoshi Okada

9 June 2010 7	Cerezo Osaka	1–2	FC Tokyo	Osaka
19:00	Komatsu 44'; Kim Jin-hyeon (yellow card) 67'; Amaral (yellow card) 78'; Fujimoto (yellow card) 81'; Inui (yellow card) 90'	Report	Kim Young-gwon (yellow card) 42'; Akamine 61'; Kajiyama 90+3'	Stadium: Nagai Stadium; Attendance: 6,296; Referee: Nobutsugu Murakami

Quarter-finals

1 September 2010 1st Leg	FC Tokyo	1–1	Shimizu S-Pulse	Tokyo
19:00	Ricardinho (yellow card) 7'; Morishige 79'	Report	Tsujio (yellow card) 54'; Okazaki 68'	Stadium: Ajinomoto Stadium; Attendance: 12,510; Referee: Hiroyoshi Takayama

8 September 2010 2nd Leg	Shimizu S-Pulse	0–0 (1a–1 agg.)	FC Tokyo	Shizuoka
19:00		Report	Suzuki (yellow card) 13'; Nakamura (yellow card) 86'	Stadium: Outsourcing Stadium Nihondaira; Attendance: 5,683; Referee: Hajime Matsuo

=== Suruga Bank Championship ===
FC Tokyo qualified for this tournament as winners of the 2009 J.League Cup.

4 August 2010 Final	FC Tokyo (Japan)	2–2 (4–3 p)	(Ecuador) LDU Quito	Tokyo
19:00 UTC+9	Hirayama 34'; Oguro 90+1'	Report	Barcos 29'; Urrutia 63' (pen.)	Stadium: National Stadium; Attendance: 19,423; Referee: Stuart Attwell (England)
	Penalties
	Oguro (penalty scored); Matsushita (penalty scored); Shigematsu (penalty missed); Konno (penalty scored); Kajiyama (penalty scored)		(penalty missed) Urrutia; (penalty scored) de la Cruz; (penalty scored) Lara; (penalty missed) Luna; (penalty scored) Calle

== Player statistics ==
No.	Pos.	Player	D.o.B. (Age)	Height / Weight	J.League 1		Emperor's Cup		J.League Cup		Total	
No.	Pos.	Player	D.o.B. (Age)	Height / Weight	Apps	Goals	Apps	Goals	Apps	Goals	Apps	Goals
1	GK	Hitoshi Shiota	May 28, 1981 (aged 28)	cm / kg	4	0						
2	DF	Yuhei Tokunaga	September 25, 1983 (aged 26)	cm / kg	30	0						
3	DF	Masato Morishige	May 21, 1987 (aged 22)	cm / kg	30	3						
4	DF	Hideto Takahashi	October 17, 1987 (aged 22)	cm / kg	3	0						
5	DF	Yuto Nagatomo	September 12, 1986 (aged 23)	cm / kg	12	1						
6	DF	Yasuyuki Konno	January 25, 1983 (aged 27)	cm / kg	34	5						
7	MF	Takuji Yonemoto	December 3, 1990 (aged 19)	cm / kg	7	0						
8	MF	Toshihiro Matsushita	October 17, 1983 (aged 26)	cm / kg	21	1						
9	FW	Shingo Akamine	December 8, 1983 (aged 26)	cm / kg	12	0						
10	MF	Yōhei Kajiyama	September 24, 1985 (aged 24)	cm / kg	24	2						
11	FW	Tatsuya Suzuki	August 1, 1982 (aged 27)	cm / kg	14	0						
13	FW	Sōta Hirayama	June 6, 1985 (aged 24)	cm / kg	30	7						
14	DF	Hokuto Nakamura	July 10, 1985 (aged 24)	cm / kg	28	0						
15	DF	Daishi Hiramatsu	July 3, 1983 (aged 26)	cm / kg	1	0						
16	FW	Ricardinho	August 8, 1988 (aged 21)	cm / kg	29	1						
17	DF	Kim Young-Kwon	February 27, 1990 (aged 20)	cm / kg	23	0						
18	MF	Naohiro Ishikawa	May 12, 1981 (aged 28)	cm / kg	31	2						
19	MF	Yohei Otake	May 2, 1989 (aged 20)	cm / kg	14	2						
20	GK	Shuichi Gonda	March 3, 1989 (aged 21)	cm / kg	30	0						
21	GK	Nobuyuki Abe	April 27, 1984 (aged 25)	cm / kg	0	0						
22	MF	Naotake Hanyu	December 22, 1979 (aged 30)	cm / kg	25	2						
24	FW	Kentaro Shigematsu	April 15, 1991 (aged 18)	cm / kg	19	3						
25	DF	Ryo Hiraide	July 18, 1991 (aged 18)	cm / kg	0	0						
26	DF	Takumi Abe	May 26, 1991 (aged 18)	cm / kg	0	0						
27	MF	Sotan Tanabe	April 6, 1990 (aged 19)	cm / kg	0	0						
28	MF	Shuto Kono	May 4, 1993 (aged 16)	cm / kg	0	0						
30	MF	Seo Yong-Duk	September 10, 1989 (aged 20)	cm / kg	0	0						
32	FW	Shunsuke Maeda	June 9, 1986 (aged 23)	cm / kg	6	0						
33	DF	Kenta Mukuhara	July 6, 1989 (aged 20)	cm / kg	24	0						
39	FW	Masashi Oguro	May 4, 1980 (aged 29)	cm / kg	22	7						

== Other pages ==
- (in Japanese) J. League official site
