= 2014 FC Tokyo season =

FC Tokyo
2014 season
- Manager: Massimo Ficcadenti
- Stadium: Ajinomoto Stadium
- J1 League: 9th
- Emperor's Cup: Round of 16
- J.League Cup: Group stage
- Top goalscorer: League: Yoshinori Muto (13); All: Edu (17)
- Average home league attendance: 25,187
Home colours	Away colours

The 2014 FC Tokyo season was the club's 14th year in existence and third consecutive season in the J.League Division 1, the top tier of Japanese football.

== Players ==
=== Senior squad ===
As of February 6, 2014 Note: Flags indicate national team as defined under FIFA eligibility rules; some limited exceptions apply. Players may hold more than one non-FIFA nationality.

No.	Pos.	Nation	Player
1	GK	(Japan) JPN	Hitoshi Shiota
2	DF	(Japan) JPN	Yuhei Tokunaga
3	DF	(Japan) JPN	Masato Morishige (captain)
4	MF	(Japan) JPN	Hideto Takahashi
5	DF	(Japan) JPN	Kenichi Kaga
6	DF	(Japan) JPN	Kosuke Ota
7	MF	(Japan) JPN	Takuji Yonemoto
8	MF	(Japan) JPN	Hitotaka Mita
9	FW	(Japan) JPN	Kazuma Watanabe
10	MF	(Japan) JPN	Yohei Kajiyama
11	FW	(Brazil) BRA	Edu
13	FW	(Japan) JPN	Sota Hirayama
14	MF	(Japan) JPN	Yoshinori Muto
15	MF	(Japan) JPN	Daishi Hiramatsu
17	MF	(Japan) JPN	Hiroki Kawano

No.	Pos.	Nation	Player
18	MF	(Japan) JPN	Naohiro Ishikawa
19	MF	(Japan) JPN	Tasuka Hiraoka
20	GK	(Japan) JPN	Shūichi Gonda
21	GK	(Japan) JPN	Ryotaro Hironaga
22	MF	(Japan) JPN	Naotake Hanyu
24	DF	(South Korea) KOR	Kwak Hee-Ju
25	DF	(Brazil) BRA	Matheus Ferraz
28	MF	(Japan) JPN	Shuto Kono
29	DF	(Japan) JPN	Kazunori Yoshimoto
31	GK	(Japan) JPN	Kentaro Kakoi
33	DF	(Japan) JPN	Kenta Mukuhara
34	MF	(Japan) JPN	Hideyuki Nozawa
38	MF	(Japan) JPN	Keigo Higashi
50	DF	(Japan) JPN	Riku Matsuda

=== Out on loan ===
Note: Flags indicate national team as defined under FIFA eligibility rules; some limited exceptions apply. Players may hold more than one non-FIFA nationality.

No.	Pos.	Nation	Player
16	DF	(Japan) JPN	Yuichi Maruyama (to Shonan Bellmare)
23	FW	(Japan) JPN	Yohei Hayashi (to Fagiano Okayama)
27	MF	(Japan) JPN	Sotan Tanabe (to CE Sabadell)
37	MF	(Japan) JPN	Kento Hashimoto (to Roasso Kumamoto)

== J1 League ==
=== League table ===
Pos	Team	Pld	W	D	L	GF	GA	GD	Pts
7	Yokohama F. Marinos	34	14	9	11	37	29	+8	51
8	Sanfrecce Hiroshima	34	13	11	10	44	37	+7	50
9	FC Tokyo	34	12	12	10	47	33	+14	48
10	Nagoya Grampus	34	13	9	12	47	48	−1	48
11	Vissel Kobe	34	11	12	11	49	50	−1	45

Updated to match(es) played on 8 December 2014. Source: J.League Data
Rules for classification: 1) points; 2) goal difference; 3) number of goals scored.

=== Matches ===
Match	Date	Team	Score	Team	Venue	Attendance
1	2014.03.01	Kashiwa Reysol	1-1	FC Tokyo	Hitachi Kashiwa Stadium	14,623
2	2014.03.08	FC Tokyo	1-1	Ventforet Kofu	Ajinomoto Stadium	22,398
3	2014.03.15	Vissel Kobe	2-1	FC Tokyo	Noevir Stadium Kobe	10,089
4	2014.03.23	FC Tokyo	0-4	Kawasaki Frontale	Ajinomoto Stadium	23,172
5	2014.03.29	Shimizu S-Pulse	1-3	FC Tokyo	IAI Stadium Nihondaira	14,420
6	2014.04.06	FC Tokyo	2-1	Sagan Tosu	Ajinomoto Stadium	14,165
7	2014.04.12	Sanfrecce Hiroshima	1-0	FC Tokyo	Edion Stadium Hiroshima	12,529
8	2014.04.19	FC Tokyo	2-0	Cerezo Osaka	Ajinomoto Stadium	40,761
9	2014.04.26	Yokohama F. Marinos	0-1	FC Tokyo	Nissan Stadium	26,058
10	2014.04.29	FC Tokyo	0-1	Nagoya Grampus	Tokyo National Stadium	25,851
11	2014.05.03	Urawa Reds	1-0	FC Tokyo	Saitama Stadium 2002	43,564
12	2014.05.06	FC Tokyo	0-1	Omiya Ardija	Ajinomoto Stadium	23,722
13	2014.05.10	Tokushima Vortis	0-0	FC Tokyo	Pocarisweat Stadium	7,451
14	2014.05.17	FC Tokyo	3-0	Gamba Osaka	Ajinomoto Stadium	26,485
15	2014.07.19	FC Tokyo	1-1	Kashima Antlers	Ajinomoto Stadium	27,387
16	2014.07.23	Albirex Niigata	0-1	FC Tokyo	Denka Big Swan Stadium	17,348
17	2014.07.27	FC Tokyo	3-0	Vegalta Sendai	Ajinomoto Stadium	15,491
18	2014.08.02	FC Tokyo	4-0	Shimizu S-Pulse	Ajinomoto Stadium	24,119
19	2014.08.09	Cerezo Osaka	0-0	FC Tokyo	Yanmar Stadium Nagai	16,211
20	2014.08.16	Sagan Tosu	0-2	FC Tokyo	Best Amenity Stadium	18,100
21	2014.08.23	FC Tokyo	4-4	Urawa Reds	Ajinomoto Stadium	32,759
22	2014.08.30	Kashima Antlers	2-2	FC Tokyo	Kashima Soccer Stadium	19,839
23	2014.09.13	FC Tokyo	1-1	Vissel Kobe	Ajinomoto Stadium	19,097
24	2014.09.20	Kawasaki Frontale	0-0	FC Tokyo	Kawasaki Todoroki Stadium	18,805
25	2014.09.23	FC Tokyo	4-0	Tokushima Vortis	Ajinomoto Stadium	22,187
26	2014.09.27	FC Tokyo	4-0	Kashiwa Reysol	Ajinomoto Stadium	22,945
27	2014.10.05	Vegalta Sendai	1-0	FC Tokyo	Yurtec Stadium Sendai	13,699
28	2014.10.18	Omiya Ardija	1-0	FC Tokyo	NACK5 Stadium Omiya	11,901
29	2014.10.22	FC Tokyo	2-1	Sanfrecce Hiroshima	Ajinomoto Stadium	13,048
30	2014.10.26	Gamba Osaka	2-1	FC Tokyo	Expo '70 Commemorative Stadium	15,695
31	2014.11.02	Nagoya Grampus	2-2	FC Tokyo	Nagoya Mizuho Athletic Stadium	13,983
32	2014.11.22	FC Tokyo	1-3	Albirex Niigata	Ajinomoto Stadium	42,059
33	2014.11.29	Ventforet Kofu	0-0	FC Tokyo	Yamanashi Chuo Bank Stadium	15,071
34	2014.12.06	FC Tokyo	1-1	Yokohama F. Marinos	Ajinomoto Stadium	32,538
