= Sōta Hirayama =

Japanese footballer (born 1985)

Sota Hirayama 平山 相太
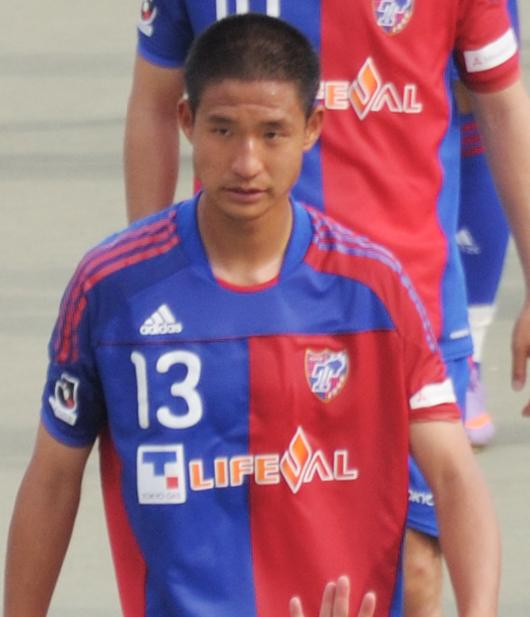
- Hirayama in 2010

Personal information
- Full name: Sota Hirayama
- Date of birth: 6 June 1985 (age 41)
- Place of birth: Kitakyushu, Fukuoka, Japan
- Height: 1.90 m (6 ft 3 in)
- Position: Forward

Youth career
- 2001–2003: Kunimi High School

College career
Years	Team	Apps	(Gls)
2004–2005	University of Tsukuba		

Senior career*
Years	Team	Apps	(Gls)
2005–2006	Heracles Almelo	32	(8)
2006–2016	FC Tokyo	169	(33)
2017	Vegalta Sendai	0	(0)
Total		201	(41)

International career
2003–2005	Japan U-20	8	(3)
2004	Japan U-23	1	(0)
2010	Japan	4	(3)
Medal record
FC Tokyo
Winner	J.League Cup	2009
Winner	Emperor's Cup	2011
Representing Japan
AFC U-19 Championship
Bronze medal – third place	2004 Malaysia
- * Club domestic league appearances and goals

Sota Hirayama (平山 相太, Hirayama Sōta; born 6 June 1985) is a Japanese former footballer. He played for Japan national team.

== Club career ==
As a teenager, Hirayama attended Kunimi High School in Nagasaki Prefecture. There, he won the All Japan High School Soccer Tournament in all years bar 2002. He is the tournament's top scorer, with 17 goals scored between 2001 and 2003, with his school participating in all three years of his high school days. After graduation in 2004, he enrolled at University of Tsukuba.

In July 2005, Hirayama joined the Eredivisie club Feyenoord on trial and a week later, he joined another Dutch side, the newly promoted Heracles Almelo. He made his professional debut with Heracles on 20 August 2005 against ADO Den Haag, playing 15 minutes and scoring 2 goals. He finished the 2005–2006 season with 31 appearances and 8 goals. Although both Japan's senior side manager Zico and Japan Football Association chairman Saburo Kawabuchi praised Hirayama's progress with Heracles, he was not called up to Japan's squad for the 2006 World Cup. On 4 September 2006, after the transfer period ended Heracles Almelo announced that Hirayama left the club by mutual consent and after being released he returned to Japan to finish his study. Only a few days later he signed a contract with FC Tokyo without informing Heracles as a free agent, while he still had a contract until 2008 before his release. Heracles appealed to this unexpected move by Hirayama.

Hirayama debuted in J1 League on 30 September 2006. After debut, his opportunity to play increased and he became a regular player from 2009. At 2009 J.League Cup, he scored a goal at Final and the club won the champions. However the club was relegated to J2 League end of 2010 season. In April 2011, he also broke his leg and he could only play one game. In 2012, the club returned to J1 League, however in May, he broke his leg again and he could hardly play in the season. From 2013 he played many matches as a substitute. He moved to Vegalta Sendai in 2017. However he got hurt on the day after the opening game. He could not play because of the injury in this season. In January 2018, he announced his retirement after too many injuries.

== International career ==
In 2003, Hirayama played for Japan U-20 national team in the 2003 World Youth Championship as a 17-year-old and scored two goals, including the game winner against Egypt to put Japan through to the knockout stage. In 2004, he played for Japan U-23 national team in the 2004 Summer Olympics and the following year, played in his second 2005 World Youth Championship.

His debut for the senior team came on 6 January 2010 in a 2011 Asian Cup qualification against Yemen, and would be a game he would never forget. After 30 minutes, Japan were down 2–0, but Hirayama scored a hat trick to help Japan to a 3–2 victory. It was the first time in 80 years and the second time overall for a Japan player to score three goals on his debut. Takeo Wakabayashi last managed that in 1930. He also played at 2010 East Asian Football Championship in February. He played 4 games and scored 3 goals for Japan in 2010.

== Club statistics ==
Club	Season	League		Cup		League Cup		UEFA		Other^{*}		Total	
Club	Season	!Apps	Goals	Apps	Goals	Apps	Goals	Apps	Goals	Apps	Goals	Apps	Goals
Kunimi H.S.	2001	-		2	1	-		-		-		2	1
Kunimi H.S.	2002	-		3	3	-		-		-		3	3
Kunimi H.S.	Total	-		5	4	-		-		-		5	4
Heracles Almelo	2005/06	31	8	0	0	-		-		2	0	33	8
Heracles Almelo	2006/07	1	0	0	0	-		-		-		1	0
Heracles Almelo	Total	32	8	0	0	-		-		2	0	34	8
FC Tokyo	2006	7	2	0	0	0	0	-		-		7	2
FC Tokyo	2007	20	5	3	2	2	0	-		-		25	7
FC Tokyo	2008	24	2	3	2	8	4	-		-		35	8
FC Tokyo	2009	26	4	3	1	9	4	-		-		38	9
FC Tokyo	2010	29	7	3	3	6	1	-		1	1	39	12
FC Tokyo	2011	1	0	0	0	-		-		-		1	0
FC Tokyo	2012	4	0	0	0	1	0	1	0	-		6	0
FC Tokyo	2013	21	5	3	1	3	0	-		-		27	6
FC Tokyo	2014	19	3	2	2	6	1	-		-		27	6
FC Tokyo	2015	2	0	0	0	2	0	-		-		4	0
FC Tokyo	2016	15	5	2	1	2	0	2	0	-		21	6
FC Tokyo	Total	168	33	19	12	39	10	3	0	1	1	230	56
Vegalta Sendai	2017	0	0	0	0	0	0	-		-		0	0
Vegalta Sendai	Total	0	0	0	0	0	0	-		-		0	0
Career total		200	41	24	16	39	10	3	0	3	1	269	68

^{*}Includes other competitive competitions, including the UEFA Intertoto Cup Play-offs and Suruga Bank Championship.

== Career statistics ==
=== International ===
Japan national team
Year	Apps	Goals
2010	4	3
Total	4	3

=== National team goals ===
Scores and results list Japan's goal tally first.

==== Under-20 ====
#	Date	Venue	Opponent	Score	Result	Competition
1.	19 October 2003	Sendai Stadium, Sendai	Chinese Taipei	2–0	7–0	AFC Youth Championship 2004 qualification
2.	23 October 2003	Sendai Stadium, Sendai	Macau	2–0	7–0	AFC Youth Championship 2004 qualification
3.	23 October 2003	Sendai Stadium, Sendai	Macau	3–0	7–0	AFC Youth Championship 2004 qualification
4.	23 October 2003	Sendai Stadium, Sendai	Macau	5–0	7–0	AFC Youth Championship 2004 qualification
5.	23 October 2003	Sendai Stadium, Sendai	Macau	6–0	7–0	AFC Youth Championship 2004 qualification
6.	23 October 2003	Sendai Stadium, Sendai	Macau	7–0	7–0	AFC Youth Championship 2004 qualification
7.	5 December 2003	Al-Maktoum Stadium, Dubai	Egypt	1–0	1–0	2003 FIFA World Youth Championship
8.	12 December 2003	Al-Rashid Stadium, Dubai	Brazil	1–4	1–5	2003 FIFA World Youth Championship
9.	25 September 2004	Larkin Stadium, Johor Bahru	Nepal	2–0	3–0	2004 AFC Youth Championship
10.	6 October 2004	Cheras Stadium, Kuala Lumpur	South Korea	2–2	2–2	2004 AFC Youth Championship
11.	10 June 2005	Parkstad Limburg Stadion, Kerkrade	Netherlands	1–2	1–2	2005 FIFA World Youth Championship

==== Under-23 ====
#	Date	Venue	Opponent	Score	Result	Competition
1.	8 February 2004	Saitama Stadium, Saitama	Iran	1–0	1–1	Friendly Match (2004 Kirin Challenge Cup)
2.	30 July 2004	National Stadium, Tokyo	Venezuela	2–0	4–0	Friendly Match (2004 Kirin Challenge Cup)
3.	3 December 2006	Qatar SC Stadium, Doha	Syria	1–0	1–0	2006 Asian Games

==== Senior team ====
#	Date	Venue	Opponent	Score	Result	Competition
1.	6 January 2010	Ali Muhesen Stadium, Sanaa	Yemen	1–2	3–2	2011 AFC Asian Cup qualification
2.	6 January 2010	Ali Muhesen Stadium, Sanaa	Yemen	2–2	3–2	2011 AFC Asian Cup qualification
3.	6 January 2010	Ali Muhesen Stadium, Sanaa	Yemen	3–2	3–2	2011 AFC Asian Cup qualification

== Awards and honours ==
=== Club ===
FC Tokyo

- J.League Cup: 1

2009

- Suruga Bank Championship: 1

2010

- J2 League: 1

2011

- Emperor's Cup: 1

2011
