= Yōhei Kajiyama =

Japanese footballer

Yohei Kajiyama 梶山 陽平
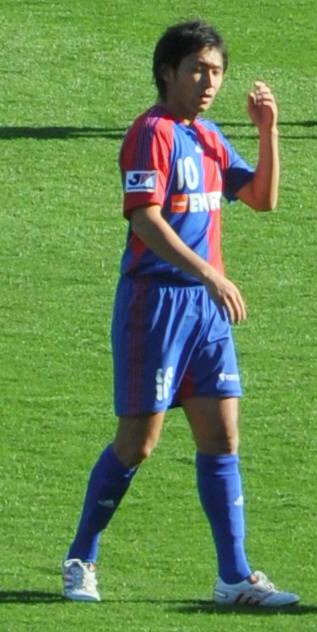

Personal information
- Full name: Yohei Kajiyama
- Date of birth: 24 September 1985 (age 41)
- Place of birth: Koto, Tokyo, Japan
- Height: 1.80 m (5 ft 11 in)
- Position: Midfielder

Youth career
- 1998–2003: FC Tokyo

Senior career*
Years	Team	Apps	(Gls)
2003–2018	FC Tokyo	292	(21)
2013	→ Panathinaikos (loan)	7	(0)
2013	→ Oita Trinita (loan)	9	(1)
2016–2018	→ FC Tokyo U-23 (loan)	13	(0)
2018	Albirex Niigata	3	(0)
Total		324	(22)

International career
2005	Japan U–20	3	(0)
2008	Japan U–23	3	(0)
Medal record
FC Tokyo
Winner	J.League Cup	2004
Winner	J.League Cup	2009
Winner	Emperor's Cup	2011
- * Club domestic league appearances and goals

Yohei Kajiyama (梶山 陽平, Kajiyama Yōhei; born 24 September 1985) is a former Japanese football player.

== Club career ==
Kajiyama was born in Koto, Tokyo on 24 September 1985. He joined FC Tokyo from youth team in 2003. He is a skilful playmaker renowned for his passing and ball control, as well as his shooting with either foot. He debuted in 2003 and played many matches from 2004. FC Tokyo won the champions in 2004 J.League Cup first major title in the club history. He became a regular defensive midfielder in 2005 and played many matches every season. He was given "number 10" shirt in 2008. FC Tokyo won the champions in 2009 J.League Cup. However FC Tokyo finished at 16th place in 2010 season and was relegated to J2 League. In 2011, FC Tokyo won the champions and was returned to J1 in a year. FC Tokyo also won the champions in 2011 Emperor's Cup.

In 2013, Kajiyama was loaned to Super League Greece club Panathinaikos. In July, he returned to FC Tokyo. However he could not play at all in the match. In August, he was loaned to Oita Trinita. Although he played many matches, Trinita finished at the bottom place in 2013 season. In 2014, he returned to FC Tokyo. However his opportunity to play decreased year by year and he could hardly play in the match in 2018. In July 2018, he moved to J2 League club Albirex Niigata. He retired end of 2018 season.

== National team career ==
In June 2005, Kajiyama was selected Japan U-20 national team for 2005 World Youth Championship. At this tournament, he played 3 matches as defensive midfielder with Yuzo Kobayashi. In August 2008, he was selected Japan U-23 national team for 2008 Summer Olympics. At this tournament, he wore the number 10 shirt for Japan and played all 3 matches as defensive midfielder.

== Club statistics ==
Updated to 8 January 2019.

Club	Season	League		Emperor's Cup		J.League Cup		Continental^{1}		Total	
Club	Season	Apps	Goals	Apps	Goals	Apps	Goals	Apps	Goals	Apps	Goals
FC Tokyo	2003	3	0	1	0	3	0	–		7	0
FC Tokyo	2004	16	2	1	0	5	2	–		22	4
FC Tokyo	2005	26	2	2	0	1	0	–		29	2
FC Tokyo	2006	30	3	2	1	5	1	–		37	5
FC Tokyo	2007	24	1	2	1	6	0	–		32	2
FC Tokyo	2008	28	1	4	1	5	0	–		37	2
FC Tokyo	2009	31	2	3	1	10	1	–		44	4
FC Tokyo	2010	24	2	3	0	6	1	1	0	34	3
FC Tokyo	2011	34	6	6	0	–		–		40	6
FC Tokyo	2012	26	2	1	0	3	1	4	1	34	4
Total		242	21	25	4	44	6	5	1	316	32
Panathinaikos	2012–13	7	0	0	0	–		–		7	0
Total		7	0	0	0	–		–		7	0
FC Tokyo	2013	0	0	0	0	0	0	–		0	0
Total		0	0	0	0	0	0	–		0	0
Oita Trinita	2013	9	1	0	0	0	0	–		9	1
Total		9	1	0	0	0	0	–		9	1
FC Tokyo	2014	7	0	1	0	0	0	–		8	0
FC Tokyo	2015	18	0	0	0	0	0	–		18	0
FC Tokyo	2016	14	0	1	0	2	0	0	0	17	0
FC Tokyo	2017	11	0	1	0	5	0	–		17	0
FC Tokyo	2018	0	0	0	0	3	1	–		3	1
Total		50	0	3	0	10	1	0	0	63	1
FC Tokyo U-23	2016	3	0	–		–		–		3	0
FC Tokyo U-23	2017	5	0	–		–		–		5	0
FC Tokyo U-23	2018	5	0	–		–		–		5	0
Total		13	0	–		–		–		13	0
Albirex Niigata	2018	3	0	0	0	0	0	–		3	0
Total		3	0	0	0	0	0	–		3	0
Career total		324	22	28	4	54	7	5	1	411	34

^{1}Includes AFC Champions League and Suruga Bank Championship.

== Honours ==
FC Tokyo

- J2 League (1) : 2011
- Emperor's Cup (1) : 2011
- J.League Cup (2) : 2004, 2009
- Suruga Bank Championship (1) : 2010
