= Naotake Hanyu =

Japanese footballer (born 1979)

Naotake Hanyu 羽生 直剛
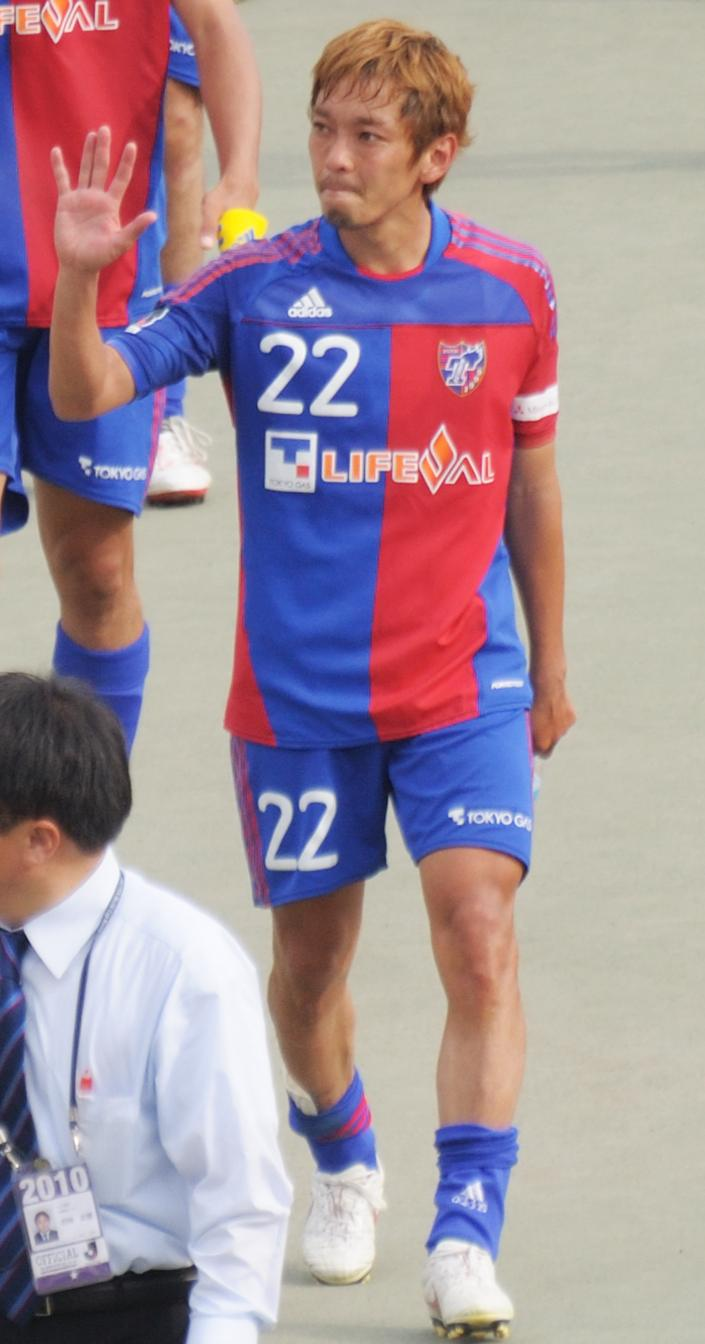

Personal information
- Full name: Naotake Hanyu
- Date of birth: December 22, 1979 (age 46)
- Place of birth: Chiba, Chiba, Japan
- Height: 1.67 m (5 ft 5 1/2 in)
- Position: Midfielder

Youth career
- 1995–1997: Yachiyo High School

College career
Years	Team	Apps	(Gls)
1998–2001	University of Tsukuba		

Senior career*
Years	Team	Apps	(Gls)
2002–2007	JEF United Chiba	165	(24)
2008–2016	FC Tokyo	196	(10)
2013	→Ventforet Kofu (loan)	20	(0)
2017	JEF United Chiba	8	(0)
Total		389	(34)

International career
2006–2008	Japan	17	(0)
Medal record
JEF United Chiba
Winner	J.League Cup	2005
Winner	J.League Cup	2006
FC Tokyo
Winner	J.League Cup	2009
Winner	Emperor's Cup	2011
- * Club domestic league appearances and goals

Naotake Hanyu (羽生 直剛, Hanyū Naotake; born December 22, 1979) is a former Japanese football player. He played for the Japan national team.

== Club career ==
Hanyu was born in Chiba on December 22, 1979. After graduating from University of Tsukuba, he joined his local club JEF United Ichihara (later JEF United Chiba) in 2002. He immediately broke into the first team and played in the opening league match against Kyoto Purple Sanga on March 3, 2002. He eventually played 22 games and scored 2 goals in his first professional season. He played many matches as an offensive midfielder. The club won the 2005 and 2006 J.League Cup. He moved to FC Tokyo in 2008. The club won the 2009 J.League Cup. The club was relegated to J2 League end of the 2010 season. In 2011, the club won the J2 League and Emperor's Cup. His opportunity to play decreased from 2012 due to injury and he moved to Ventforet Kofu on loan in 2013. He returned to FC Tokyo in 2014. He moved to JEF United Chiba in 2017. He played the club for the first time in 10 years and retired at the end of the season.

== National team career ==
Hanyu represented Japan for the 2001 Summer Universiade held in Beijing, when he was a student at the University of Tsukuba. He was instrumental in Japan winning the tournament by scoring 3 goals, including the lone goal in the final against Ukraine.

On August 13, 2006, he debuted for the Japan national team in a 2007 Asian Cup qualification match against Yemen, when he replaced Yuichi Komano at half time. He was a member of the Japan team for the 2007 Asian Cup and played five games as a substitute. In the third place play-off against South Korea, Hanyu was substituted on to replace Kengo Nakamura in the 72nd minute, in a 0-0 draw. A penalty shootout was required to break the deadlock and he missed the sixth penalty shot for Japan. Japan lost the shootout and finished 4th in the tournament. He played 17 games for Japan until 2008.

== Club statistics ==
Club	Season	League		Emperor's Cup		J.League Cup		Continental		Total	
Club	Season	Apps	Goals	Apps	Goals	Apps	Goals	Apps	Goals	Apps	Goals
University of Tsukuba	1999	–		1	0	–		–		1	0
University of Tsukuba	2000	–		2	0	–		–		2	0
JEF United Ichihara	2002	23	2	4	0	5	0	–		32	2
JEF United Ichihara	2003	25	6	3	1	2	0	–		30	7
JEF United Ichihara	2004	25	1	0	0	6	0	–		31	1
JEF United Chiba	2005	31	2	1	0	10	2	–		42	4
JEF United Chiba	2006	32	7	1	0	9	2	–		42	9
JEF United Chiba	2007	29	6	1	0	4	1	–		34	7
FC Tokyo	2008	27	1	4	0	4	0	–		35	1
FC Tokyo	2009	34	2	3	0	8	0	–		45	2
FC Tokyo	2010	25	2	2	0	7	0	–		34	2
FC Tokyo	2011	37	5	5	0	–		–		37	5
FC Tokyo	2012	13	0	1	0	1	0	4	0	19	0
Ventforet Kofu	2013	20	0	3	0	2	0	–		25	0
FC Tokyo	2014	21	0	2	0	4	0	–		27	0
FC Tokyo	2015	25	0	1	0	6	0	–		32	0
FC Tokyo	2016	14	0	1	0	2	0	5	0	22	0
JEF United Chiba	2017	8	0	1	0	–		–		9	0
Career total		389	34	36	1	70	5	9	0	504	40

== National team statistics ==
Japan national team
Year	Apps	Goals
2006	5	0
2007	7	0
2008	5	0
Total	17	0

=== Appearances in major competitions ===
Year	Competition	Category	Appearances		Goals	Team record
Year	Competition	Category	Start	Sub	Goals	Team record
2006	2007 AFC Asian Cup qualification	Senior	1	3	0	Qualified
2007	2007 AFC Asian Cup	Senior	0	5	0	4th place

== Honors and awards ==
=== Teams ===
JEF United Chiba

- J.League Cup: 2005, 2006

FC Tokyo

- J2 League: 2011
- Emperor's Cup: 2011
- J.League Cup: 2009
