= Shinji Murakami =

Japanese contemporary artist (born 1980)

- 村上真司
- Born: 1980 (age 45–46); Osaka Prefecture, Japan
- Known for: Sculpture, painting, augmented reality, installation
- Movement: 8-bit art, new media art
- Website: murakamishinji.com

Shinji Murakami (Japanese: 村上真司, born 1980) is a Japanese contemporary artist based in Brooklyn, New York. He is known for translating 8-bit video-game aesthetics into physical sculptures, paintings, LED works and augmented reality, often rendering flat pixel imagery using materials such as wood, acrylic and resin.

== Early life ==
Murakami was born in 1980 in Osaka Prefecture, Japan. He began as a street artist in Tokyo in his twenties, and relocated to New York in 2009.

== Work ==
Murakami's work is inspired by 8-bit video game culture and draws on the design philosophy of Gunpei Yokoi, the inventor of Nintendo's Game Boy, known as "Lateral Thinking with Withered Technology" — the idea of finding new uses for mature, inexpensive technology. He is known for three-dimensional renderings of flat, 8-bit pixel imagery, working in materials such as wood, acrylic and LED panels. Beginning in 2021 he produced original games for the Atari 2600 console and incorporated augmented reality into his paintings; he later used these games as source material for LED and sculptural works.

== Exhibitions ==
Murakami has been represented by Catinca Tabacaru Gallery since the gallery opened in 2014. His solo exhibitions include 🌺🌷🌼❤️🐴✨🌈🌸🌹, an emoji-titled show at the gallery in New York (2016); Lateral Thinking with Withered Technology at the same gallery (2017); Pizza Boy at Atelier 35, Bucharest (2023); and 2600 at NOWHERE, New York (2024).

== Public commissions and collections ==
Murakami has created site-specific ceramic-tile wall murals for Salesforce offices in cities worldwide, including San Francisco, New York, Tokyo, Sydney, Hyderabad, Dublin, and Chicago. His 2012 work Chippewa Square, an acrylic-and-resin panel rendering the Savannah square in 8-bit form, is held in the permanent collection of the Telfair Museums in Savannah, Georgia, a gift of the artist.

== Recognition ==
In 2011 Murakami was named in Modern Painters' "100 Artists to Watch" feature. His work has been covered by publications including Vogue, Juxtapoz, Hyperallergic and Artnet.
