= Kota Morimura =

Japanese footballer

Kota Morimura 森村 昂太
Personal information
- Full name: Kota Morimura
- Date of birth: August 14, 1988 (age 38)
- Place of birth: Kodaira, Tokyo, Japan
- Height: 1.80 m (5 ft 11 in)
- Position: Midfielder

Team information
- Current team: Criacao Shinjuku
- Number: 29

Youth career
- 2001–2006: FC Tokyo Youth

Senior career*
Years	Team	Apps	(Gls)
2007–2008	FC Tokyo	3	(0)
2009–2010	Mito HollyHock	68	(6)
2011–2013	Giravanz Kitakyushu	84	(7)
2014–2015	Avispa Fukuoka	32	(1)
2015–2020	Machida Zelvia	182	(10)
2020-	Criacao Shinjuku	66	(2)
Total		435	(26)

International career
2004	Japan U-16		
- * Club domestic league appearances and goals as of 23/1/24 @ 06:45(AEST)

Kota Morimura (森村 昂太, Morimura Kōta; born August 14, 1988 in Kodaira, Tokyo) is a Japanese football player currently playing for Criacao Shinjuku.

== Career statistics ==
Updated to end of 2018 season.

Club performance			League		Cup		League Cup		Total	
Season	Club	League	Apps	Goals	Apps	Goals	Apps	Goals	Apps	Goals
Japan			League		Emperor's Cup		League Cup		Total	
2007	FC Tokyo	J1 League	1	0	0	0	0	0	1	0
2008	FC Tokyo	J1 League	2	0	0	0	0	0	2	0
2009	Mito HollyHock	J2 League	46	5	1	0	-		47	5
2010	Mito HollyHock	J2 League	22	1	2	0	-		24	1
2011	Giravanz Kitakyushu	J2 League	33	3	2	0	-		35	3
2012	Giravanz Kitakyushu	J2 League	19	0	1	0	-		20	0
2013	Giravanz Kitakyushu	J2 League	32	4	1	1	-		33	5
2014	Avispa Fukuoka	J2 League	31	1	1	0	-		32	1
2015	Avispa Fukuoka	J2 League	1	0	-		-		1	0
2015	Machida Zelvia	J3 League	18	2	3	0	-		21	2
2016	Machida Zelvia	J2 League	39	1	1	0	-		40	1
2017	Machida Zelvia	J2 League	36	2	1	0	-		37	2
2018	Machida Zelvia	J2 League	31	2	0	0	-		31	2
Career total			311	21	13	1	0	0	324	22
