= Kosuke Ota =

Japanese footballer

Kosuke Ota 太田 宏介
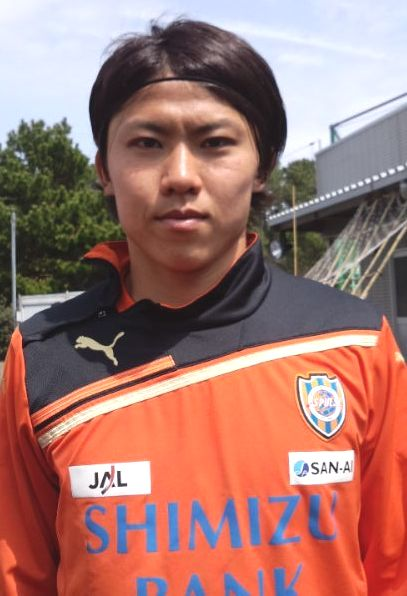

Personal information
- Full name: Kosuke Ota
- Date of birth: 23 July 1987 (age 39)
- Place of birth: Tokyo, Japan
- Height: 1.78 m (5 ft 10 in)
- Position: Left back

Youth career
- 1994–1999: Tsukushino SSS
- 2000–2002: Machida Zelvia
- 2002–2005: Azabu University High School

Senior career*
Years	Team	Apps	(Gls)
2006–2008	Yokohama FC	49	(0)
2009–2011	Shimizu S-Pulse	85	(2)
2012–2015	FC Tokyo	112	(7)
2016–2017	Vitesse	26	(0)
2017–2019	FC Tokyo	61	(2)
2019–2020	Nagoya Grampus	21	(0)
2020–2022	Perth Glory	30	(0)
2022–2023	Machida Zelvia	18	(0)

International career
2007	Japan U20	1	(0)
2010–2015	Japan	7	(0)
Medal record
Shimizu S-Pulse
Runner-up	Emperor's Cup	2010
- * Club domestic league appearances and goals as of 12 November 2023, 8:20 (UTC)

Kosuke Ota (太田 宏介, Ōta Kōsuke; born July 23, 1987) is a Japanese former football player who played as a defender.

== Club career ==
Ota began his footballing career with Yokohama FC in 2006, before a move to J1 League side Shimizu S-Pulse in 2009. After making 85 league appearances and scoring two goals, Ota joined FC Tokyo in 2012. He remained in Tokyo for three years before leaving Japanese football for the first time as he completed a transfer to Eredivisie team Vitesse, based in Arnhem. He played in 28 matches in all competitions during the 2015–16 and 2016–17 seasons before returning to FC Tokyo, having struggled to adapt to life in the Netherlands.

He would subsequently play for FC Tokyo and Nagoya Grampus before joining Perth Glory FC in Australia. Ota's debut for Perth Glory in 2021 was as a substitute against Brisbane Roar, in which he contributed two assists. On 18 July 2022, Ota signed to J2 club, Machida Zelvia for during mid 2022 season. On 3 October 2023, Ota officially announced his retirement from football at the end of this season after getting minimal game time at Machida Zelvia.

== International career ==
In July 2007, Ota was selected as a member for the Japan U-20 national team for the 2007 U-20 World Cup. At the tournament, he played 1 match as a left-back against Nigeria.

He made his full international debut for Japan on January 6, 2010, in a 2011 Asian Cup qualification match against Yemen. He would make 7 appearances for the Samurai Blue over a five year span, with his last one coming in 2015.

== Career statistics ==
=== Club ===
As of the end 2023 season.

Club performance			League		Cup		League Cup		Continental		Other^{1}		Total	
Season	Club	League	Apps	Goals	Apps	Goals	Apps	Goals	Apps	Goals	Apps	Goals	Apps	Goals
Japan			League		Emperor's Cup		J.League Cup		Asia				Total	
2006	Yokohama FC	J2 League	1	0	1	0	-		-		-		2	0
2007	Yokohama FC	J1 League	17	0	0	0	3	0	-		-		20	0
2008	Yokohama FC	J2 League	31	0	1	0	-		-		-		32	0
2009	Shimizu S-Pulse	J1 League	23	0	5	0	4	0	-		-		32	0
2010	Shimizu S-Pulse	J1 League	28	1	5	0	9	0	-		-		42	1
2011	Shimizu S-Pulse	J1 League	34	1	3	0	3	0	-		-		40	1
2012	FC Tokyo	J1 League	14	0	0	0	0	0	4	0	1	0	19	0
2013	FC Tokyo	J1 League	34	3	5	2	5	0	-		-		44	5
2014	FC Tokyo	J1 League	34	1	2	1	5	1	-		-		41	3
2015	FC Tokyo	J1 League	30	3	5	0	1	0	-		-		36	3
Netherlands			League		KNVB Cup				Europe				Total	
2015–16	Vitesse	Eredivisie	16	0	0	0	-		-		-		16	0
2016–17	Vitesse	Eredivisie	10	0	2	0	-		-		-		12	0
Japan			League		Emperor's Cup		J.League Cup		Asia				Total	
2017	FC Tokyo	J1 League	32	1	0	0	1	0	-		-		33	1
2018	FC Tokyo	J1 League	25	1	2	0	2	0	-		-		29	1
2019	FC Tokyo	J1 League	3	0	0	0	8	1	-		-		11	1
2019	Nagoya Grampus	J1 League	12	0	0	0	0	0	-		-		12	0
2020	Nagoya Grampus	J1 League	9	0	0	0	2	0	-		-		11	0
Australia			League		FFA Cup				Asia				Total	
2020–21	Perth Glory	A-League	19	0	-		-		-		-		19	0
2021–22	Perth Glory	A-League	11	0	-		-		-		-		11	0
Japan			League		Emperor's Cup		J.League Cup		Asia				Total	
2022	Machida Zelvia	J2 League	7	0	0	0	-		-		-		7	0
2023	Machida Zelvia	J2 League	11	0	0	0	-		-		-		0	0
Career total			401	11	28	4	50	2	4	0	1	0	484	17

^{1}Includes Japanese Super Cup.

=== International ===
Japan national team
Year	Apps	Goals
2010	1	0
2011	0	0
2012	0	0
2013	0	0
2014	3	0
2015	3	0
Total	7	0
