= Ryo Hiraide =

Japanese footballer (born 1991)

Ryo Hiraide 平出涼
Personal information
- Full name: Ryo Hiraide
- Date of birth: July 18, 1991 (age 35)
- Place of birth: Kai, Yamanashi, Japan
- Height: 1.76 m (5 ft 9 1/2 in)
- Position: Defender

Team information
- Current team: Atletico Suzuka Club
- Number: 5

Youth career
- 1998–2006: Fortuna SC
- 2007–2009: FC Tokyo

Senior career*
Years	Team	Apps	(Gls)
2010–2013	FC Tokyo	0	(0)
2011–2013	→ Kataller Toyama (loan)	86	(0)
2014–2017	Kataller Toyama	115	(5)
2018–2021	Kagoshima United FC	43	(1)
2021–2022	ReinMeer Aomori	27	(2)
2022–	Atletico Suzuka Club	50	(3)
- * Club domestic league appearances and goals as of 26/1/24 @ 06:08(AEST)

Ryo Hiraide (平出 涼, Hiraide Ryō; born July 18, 1991 in Yamanashi) is a Japanese football player.

== Club statistics ==
Updated to end of 2018 season.

Appearances and goals by club, season and competition
Club	Season	League			Emperor's Cup		J.League Cup		Total	
Club	Season	Division	Apps	Goals	Apps	Goals	Apps	Goals	Apps	Goals
FC Tokyo	2010	J1 League	0	0	2	0	0	0	2	0
Kataller Toyama	2011	J2 League	26	0	0	0	-		26	0
Kataller Toyama	2012	J2 League	26	0	0	0	-		26	0
Kataller Toyama	2013	J2 League	34	0	0	0	-		34	0
Kataller Toyama	2014	J2 League	24	0	1	0	-		25	0
Kataller Toyama	2015	J3 League	32	0	-		-		32	0
Kataller Toyama	2016	J3 League	30	3	2	0	-		32	3
Kataller Toyama	2017	J3 League	29	2	2	0	-		31	2
Kagoshima United	2018	J3 League	32	0	1	0	-		33	0
Total			233	5	8	0	0	0	241	5
