= Yohei Otake =

Japanese footballer (born 1989)

Yohei Otake 大竹 洋平
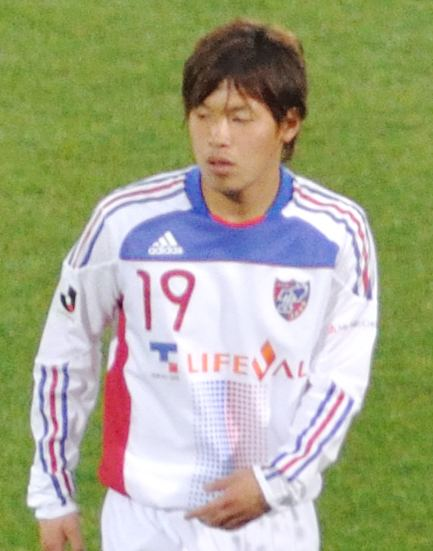

Personal information
- Full name: Yohei Otake
- Date of birth: 2 May 1989 (age 37)
- Place of birth: Yashio, Saitama, Japan
- Height: 1.66 m (5 ft 5 in)
- Position: Midfielder

Team information
- Current team: Albirex Niigata (S)
- Number: 10

Youth career
- 2002–2007: FC Tokyo

Senior career*
Years	Team	Apps	(Gls)
2008–2013	FC Tokyo	53	(7)
2011	→ Cerezo Osaka (loan)	5	(1)
2013–2016	Shonan Bellmare	47	(2)
2017–2018	Fagiano Okayama	46	(4)
2019–2023	V-Varen Nagasaki	97	(9)
2024–	Albirex Niigata (S)	15	(3)
Medal record
FC Tokyo
Winner	J.League Cup	2009
Winner	Emperor's Cup	2011
- * Club domestic league appearances and goals as of 29 August 2022

Yohei Otake (大竹 洋平, Ōtake Yōhei; born 2 May 1989 in Yashio, Saitama) is a Japanese footballer who currently plays as a midfielder for Singapore Premier League club Albirex Niigata (S).

== Club statistics ==
Updated to 1 March 2019.

Club performance			League		Cup		League Cup		Total	
Season	Club	League	Apps	Goals	Apps	Goals	Apps	Goals	Apps	Goals
Japan			League		Cup		League Cup		Total	
2008	FC Tokyo	J1 League	23	4	0	0	4	0	27	4
2009	FC Tokyo	J1 League	13	0	1	0	6	1	20	1
2010	FC Tokyo	J1 League	14	2	5	2	6	1	25	5
2011	FC Tokyo	J1 League	11	1	0	0	0	0	11	1
Total			61	7	6	2	16	2	83	11
2011	Cerezo Osaka	J1 League	5	1	3	1	1	0	9	2
Total			5	1	3	1	1	0	9	2
2012	FC Tokyo	J1 League	3	0	1	0	0	0	4	0
2013	FC Tokyo	J1 League	0	0	–		1	0	1	0
Total			3	0	1	0	1	0	5	0
2013	Shonan Bellmare	J1 League	9	1	1	0	–		10	1
2014	Shonan Bellmare	J2 League	13	0	1	0	–		14	0
2015	Shonan Bellmare	J1 League	17	0	0	0	3	0	20	0
2016	Shonan Bellmare	J1 League	8	1	0	0	5	0	13	1
Total			47	2	2	0	8	0	57	2
2017	Fagiano Okayama	J2 League	29	3	2	0	–		31	3
2018	Fagiano Okayama	J2 League	17	1	0	0	–		17	1
Total			46	4	2	0	0	0	48	4
2019	V-Varen Nagasaki	J2 League	39	4	3	0	2	0	44	4
2020	V-Varen Nagasaki	J2 League	24	5	0	0	0	0	24	5
2021	V-Varen Nagasaki	J2 League	10	0	0	0	2	2	12	2
2022	V-Varen Nagasaki	J2 League	18	0	0	0	3	0	21	0
2023	V-Varen Nagasaki	J2 League	6	0	0	0	0	0	6	0
Total			97	9	3	0	7	2	107	11
2024–25	Albirex Niigata (S)	Singapore Premier League	0	0	0	0	0	0	0	0
Total			0	0	0	0	0	0	0	0
Career total			247	23	17	3	33	4	298	30

== Honours ==
=== FC Tokyo ===
- J.League Cup: 2009
