= Tatsuya Suzuki (footballer, born 1982) =

Japanese footballer

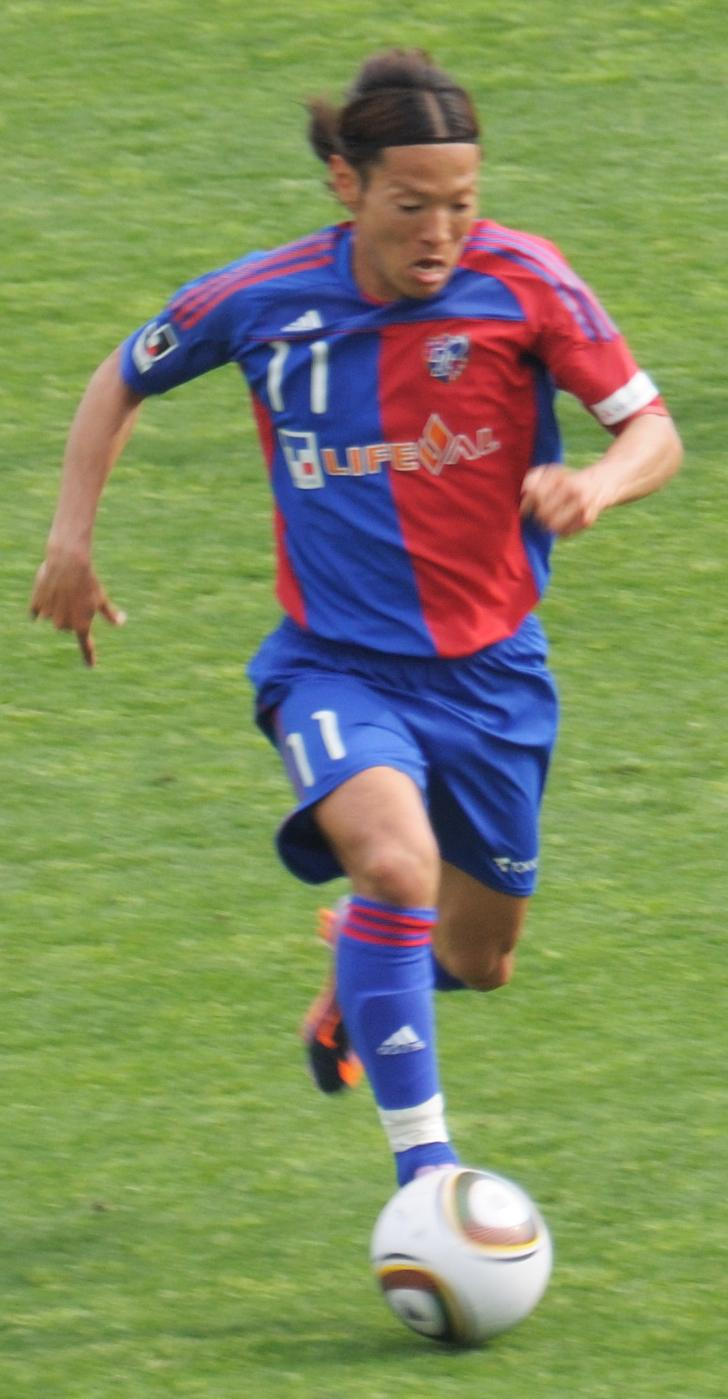

Personal information
- Full name: Tatsuya Suzuki
- Date of birth: August 1, 1982 (age 44)
- Place of birth: Kanagawa, Japan
- Height: 1.71 m (5 ft 7 1/2 in)
- Position: Forward

Youth career
- 1998–2000: Yokohama F. Marinos
- 2001–2004: University of Tsukuba

Senior career*
Years	Team	Apps	(Gls)
2005–2008	Kashiwa Reysol	65	(7)
2008–2011	FC Tokyo	73	(7)
2012–2013	Tokushima Vortis	43	(2)
Total		181	(16)
Medal record
Kashiwa Reysol
Runner-up	Emperor's Cup	2008
FC Tokyo
Winner	J.League Cup	2009
Winner	Emperor's Cup	2011
- * Club domestic league appearances and goals

Tatsuya Suzuki (鈴木 達也, Suzuki Tatsuya; born August 1, 1982) is a former Japanese football player.

== Career statistics ==
Appearances and goals by club, season and competition
Club	Season	League			Emperor's Cup		J.League Cup		Total	
Club	Season	Division	Apps	Goals	Apps	Goals	Apps	Goals	Apps	Goals
Kashiwa Reysol	2005	J1 League	1	0	2	0	1	2	4	2
Kashiwa Reysol	2006	J2 League	33	5	1	0	—		34	5
Kashiwa Reysol	2007	J1 League	16	2	1	0	4	1	21	3
Kashiwa Reysol	2008	J1 League	15	0	0	0	0	0	15	0
FC Tokyo	2008	J1 League	8	1	3	1	0	0	11	2
FC Tokyo	2009	J1 League	33	4	2	1	10	0	45	5
FC Tokyo	2010	J1 League	14	0	3	0	7	0	24	0
Career total			120	12	11	4	23	1	154	17
