= Kenta Mukuhara =

Japanese footballer

Kenta Mukuhara 椋原 健太
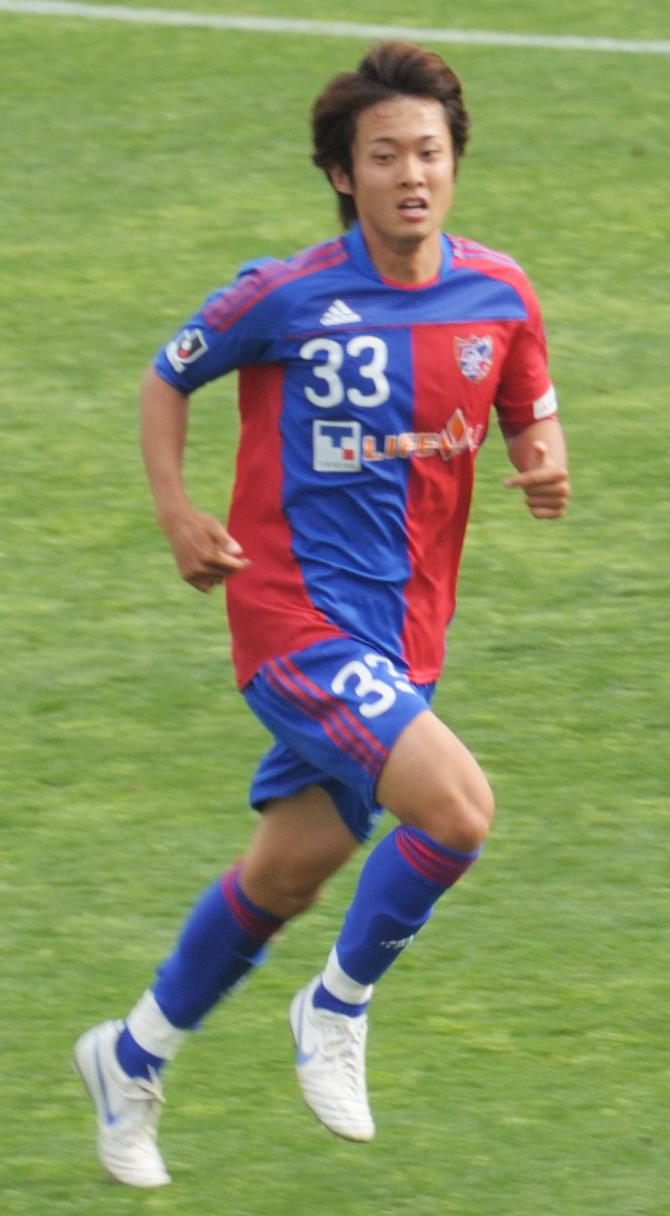

Personal information
- Full name: Kenta Mukuhara
- Date of birth: 6 July 1989 (age 37)
- Place of birth: Ōta, Tokyo, Japan
- Height: 1.72 m (5 ft 8 in)
- Position: Defender

Youth career
- 2002–2007: FC Tokyo Youth

Senior career*
Years	Team	Apps	(Gls)
2008–2014	FC Tokyo	83	(3)
2013	→ Cerezo Osaka (loan)	4	(0)
2015–2017	Cerezo Osaka	17	(0)
2016–2017	→ Cerezo Osaka U-23 (loan)	16	(0)
2017	→ Sanfrecce Hiroshima (loan)	8	(0)
2018–2020	Fagiano Okayama	98	(0)
Total		226	(3)
Medal record
FC Tokyo
Winner	J.League Cup	2009
Winner	Emperor's Cup	2011
Cerezo Osaka
Winner	J.League Cup	2017
Winner	Emperor's Cup	2017
- * Club domestic league appearances and goals as of 4 January 2021

Kenta Mukuhara (椋原 健太, Mukuhara Kenta; born 6 July 1989 in Ōta, Tokyo) is a Japanese former professional footballer who played as a defender.

== Career ==
Mukuhara played for Fagiano Okayama, which is in the J2 League. However, he retired after three seasons in December of 2020.

== Career statistics ==
Appearances and goals by club, season and competition
Club	Season	League			National cup (Note: Includes Emperors Cup)		League cup (Note: Includes J.League Cup)		Continental		Other		Total	
Club	Season	Division	Apps	Goals	Apps	Goals	Apps	Goals	Apps	Goals	Apps	Goals	Apps	Goals
FC Tokyo	2008	J.League Division 1	3	0	0	0	3	0	0	0	0	0	6	0
FC Tokyo	2009	J.League Division 1	11	0	3	0	9	0	0	0	0	0	23	0
FC Tokyo	2010	J.League Division 1	24	0	4	0	8	0	0	0	1 (Note: Appearance in Suruga Bank Championship)	0	37	0
FC Tokyo	2011	J.League Division 2	26	2	6	0	0	0	0	0	0	0	32	2
FC Tokyo	2012	J.League Division 1	19	1	1	0	4	0	3 (Note: Appearances in AFC Champions League Elite)	1	1 (Note: Appearance in Japanese Super Cup)	0	28	2
FC Tokyo	2014	J.League Division 1	0	0	1	0	1	0	0	0	0	0	2	0
FC Tokyo	Total		83	3	15	0	25	0	3	1	2	0	128	4
Cerezo Osaka (loan)	2013	J.League Division 1	4	0	1	0	1	0	–		–		6	0
Cerezo Osaka	2013	J.League Division 1	4	0	1	0	1	0	–		–		6	0
Cerezo Osaka	2015	J2 League	16	0	1	0	0	0	–		–		17	0
Cerezo Osaka	2016	J2 League	1	0	1	0	0	0	–		–		2	0
Cerezo Osaka	2017	J1 League	0	0	0	0	0	0	–		–		0	0
Cerezo Osaka	Total		17	0	2	0	0	0	0	0	0	0	19	0
Cerezo Osaka U-23 (loan)	2016	J3 League	7	0	–		–		–		–		7	0
Cerezo Osaka U-23 (loan)	2017	J3 League	9	0	–		–		–		–		9	0
Cerezo Osaka U-23 (loan)	Total		16	0	0	0	0	0	0	0	0	0	16	0
Sanfrecce Hiroshima (loan)	2017	J1 League	8	0	–		–		–		–		8	0
Fagiano Okayama	2018	J2 League	32	0	0	0	–		–		–		32	0
Fagiano Okayama	2019	J2 League	30	0	1	0	–		–		–		31	0
Fagiano Okayama	2020	J2 League	36	0	0	0	–		–		–		36	0
Fagiano Okayama	Total		98	0	1	0	0	0	0	0	0	0	99	0
Career total			226	3	19	0	26	0	3	1	2	0	276	4

== Honours ==
=== Club ===
F.C. Tokyo

- J. League Division 2 (1) : 2011
- Emperor's Cup (1) : 2011
- J. League Cup (1) : 2009
- Suruga Bank Championship (1) : 2010
