= Shūichi Gonda =

Japanese footballer (born 1989)

Shūichi Gonda 権田 修一
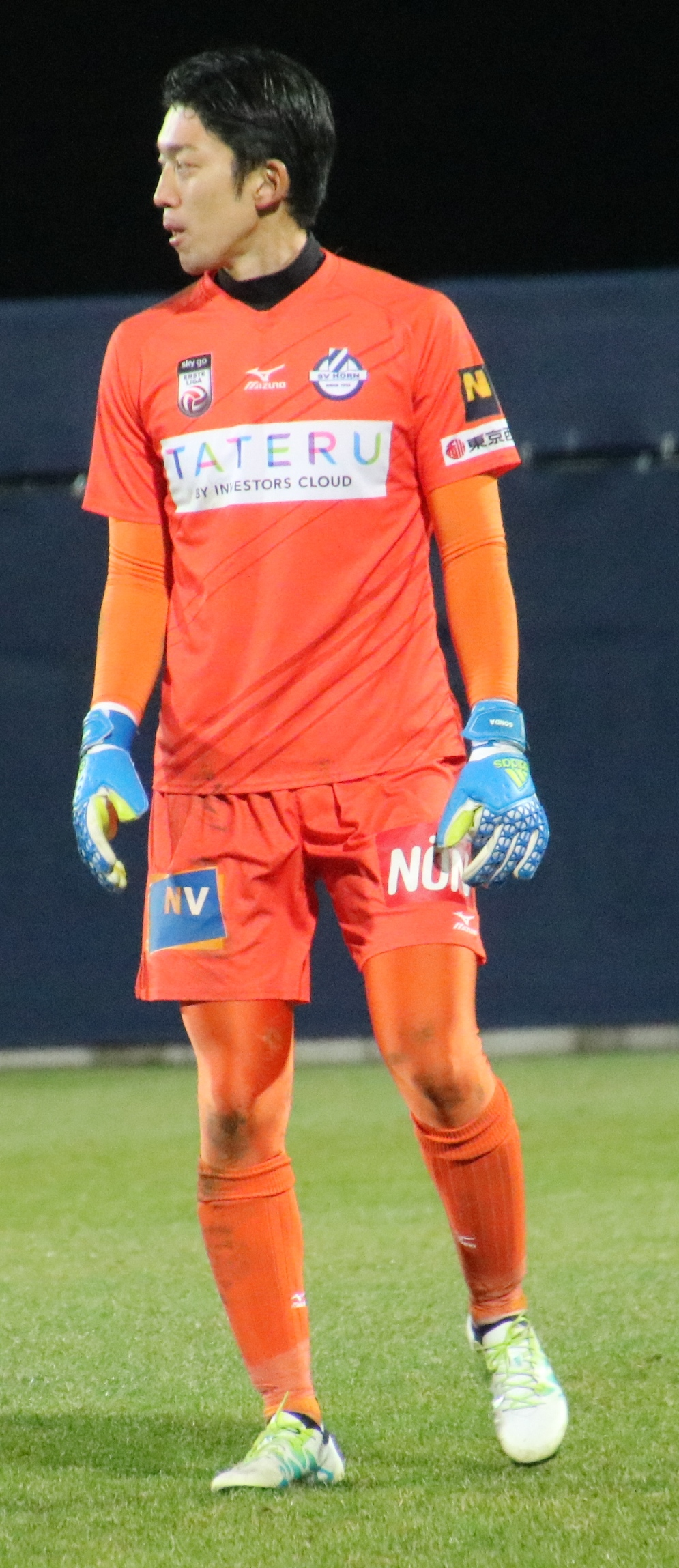
- Gonda with SV Horn

Personal information
- Full name: Shūichi Gonda
- Date of birth: 3 March 1989 (age 37)
- Place of birth: Setagaya, Tokyo, Japan
- Height: 1.87 m (6 ft 2 in)
- Position: Goalkeeper

Team information
- Current team: Vissel Kobe
- Number: 71

Youth career
- 1995–2000: Saginuma SC
- 2001–2006: FC Tokyo

Senior career*
Years	Team	Apps	(Gls)
2007–2017	FC Tokyo	203	(0)
2016–2017	→ SV Horn (loan)	17	(0)
2017–2018	Sagan Tosu	67	(0)
2019–2021	Portimonense	15	(0)
2021	→ Shimizu S-Pulse (loan)	38	(0)
2022–2024	Shimizu S-Pulse	148	(0)
2025	Debreceni VSC	4	(0)
2025-	Vissel Kobe	9	(0)

International career^{‡}
2008–2009	Japan U20	11	(0)
2011–2012	Japan U23	21	(0)
2010–2022	Japan	38	(0)
Medal record
Representing Japan
AFC Asian Cup
Gold medal – first place	2011 Qatar
Silver medal – second place	2019 United Arab Emirates
- * Club domestic league appearances and goals as of 10 August 2026 ‡ National team caps and goals as of 5 December 2022, 12:20 (UTC)

Shūichi Gonda (権田 修一, Gonda Shūichi; born 3 March 1989) is a Japanese professional footballer who plays as a goalkeeper for J1 League club Vissel Kobe. He also represented the Japan national team at the 2014 and 2022 FIFA World cup.

== Career ==
Gonda has made 244 appearances in all competitions for current J1 League club FC Tokyo between 2007 and 2016. During that time, he has won four honours with Tokyo and two with the Japan national team, with whom he made his full international debut on 6 January 2010 in a 2011 AFC Asian Cup qualifier against Yemen. He has made 32 appearances at various youth levels for Japan. After nine years with FC Tokyo, Gonda left Japanese football for the first time on 9 January 2016 as he agreed to join Keisuke Honda's Austrian Regional League side SV Horn on loan until 31 December 2016. Gonda returned to Japan and Joined Sagan Tosu in 2017 until he left the club in 2018. Gonda went abroad to Portugal and joined to Portuguese club, Portimonense SC in 2019. Gonda then returned again to Japan and transferred to J1 club, Shimizu S-Pulse in 2021 as a loan initially, before later permanently transferring after a season at Shimizu due to Portimonense SC's relegation from the top tier in 2022.

== Career statistics ==
=== Club ===
As of 25 May 2025.

Appearances and goals by club, season and competition
Club	Season	League			National cup		League cup		Continental (Note: Includes AFC Champions League.)		Other (Note: Includes Suruga Bank Championship.)		Total	
Club	Season	Division	Apps	Goals	Apps	Goals	Apps	Goals	Apps	Goals	Apps	Goals	Apps	Goals
FC Tokyo	2007	J League Div. 1	0	0	0	0	0	0	—				0	0
FC Tokyo	2008	J League Div. 1	0	0	0	0	0	0	—				0	0
FC Tokyo	2009	J League Div. 1	34	0	1 (Note: Appearances at the Emperor's Cup)	0	10 (Note: Appearances at the J.League Cup)	0	—				45	0
FC Tokyo	2010	J League Div. 1	30	0	2	0	7	0	—		1	0	40	0
FC Tokyo	2011	J League Div. 2	20	0	5	0	—						25	0
FC Tokyo	2012	J League Div. 1	31	0	0	0	0	0	5	0	—		36	0
FC Tokyo	2013	J League Div. 1	33	0	2	0	0	0	—				35	0
FC Tokyo	2014	J League Div. 1	33	0	1	0	0	0	—				34	0
FC Tokyo	2015	J1 League	22	0	0	0	5	0	—				27	0
FC Tokyo	Total		203	0	11	0	22	0	5	0	1	0	242	0
SV Horn (loan)	2015–16	Austrian Regional Leagues	2	0	0	0	—						2	0
SV Horn (loan)	2016–17	Austrian Football First League	15	0	1 (Note: Appearances at the Austrian Cup)	0	—						16	0
SV Horn (loan)	Total		17	0	1	0	0	0	0	0	0	0	18	0
Sagan Tosu	2017	J1 League	33	0	2	0	4	0	—				39	0
Sagan Tosu	2018	J1 League	34	0	4	0	3	0	—				41	0
Sagan Tosu	Total		67	0	6	0	7	0	0	0	0	0	80	0
Portimonense	2018–19	Primeira Liga	1	0	0	0	0	0	—				1	0
Portimonense	2019–20	Primeira Liga	14	0	1 (Note: Appearances at the Taça de Portugal)	0	3 (Note: Appearances at the Taça da Liga)	0	—				18	0
Portimonense	2020–21	Primeira Liga	0	0	0	0	0	0	—				0	0
Portimonense	Total		15	0	1	0	3	0	0	0	0	0	19	0
Shimizu S-Pulse (loan)	2021	J1 League	38	0	0	0	0	0	—				38	0
Shimizu S-Pulse	2022	J1 League	33	0	1	0	1	0	—				35	0
Shimizu S-Pulse	2023	J2 League	2	0	0	0	0	0	—				2	0
Shimizu S-Pulse	Total		73	0	1	0	1	0	0	0	0	0	75	0
Debreceni VSC	2025	Nemzeti Bajnokság I	4	0	0	0	0	0	—				4	0
Career total			379	0	19	0	33	0	5	0	1	0	438	0

=== International ===
As of 17 November 2022

Appearances and goals by national team and year
National team	Year	Apps	Goals
Japan U20	2007	2	0
Japan U20	2008	8	0
Japan U20	2009	1	0
Total		11	0
Japan U23	2011	5	0
Total		5	0
Japan	2010	1	0
Japan	2011	0	0
Japan	2012	0	0
Japan	2013	1	0
Japan	2014	0	0
Japan	2015	1	0
Japan	2016	0	0
Japan	2017	0	0
Japan	2018	2	0
Japan	2019	11	0
Japan	2020	2	0
Japan	2021	10	0
Japan	2022	6	0
Total		34	0

== Honours ==
FC Tokyo

- J. League Division 2: 2011
- Emperor's Cup: 2011
- J. League Cup: 2009
- Suruga Bank Championship: 2010

Vissel Kobe

- J1 100 Year Vision League: 2026

Japan

- AFC Asian Cup: 2011; runner-up 2019
- EAFF East Asian Cup: 2013

Individual

- AFC Asian Cup Team of the Tournament: 2019
- J2 League Best XI: 2023
