= Daishi Hiramatsu =

Japanese footballer

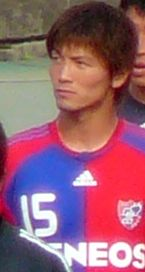

Personal information
- Full name: Daishi Hiramatsu
- Date of birth: 3 July 1983 (age 43)
- Place of birth: Tochigi, Japan
- Height: 1.76 m (5 ft 9 1/2 in)
- Position: Defender

Youth career
- 2002–2005: Chuo University

Senior career*
Years	Team	Apps	(Gls)
2006–2008	Mito HollyHock	92	(4)
2009–2013	FC Tokyo	8	(1)
Total		100	(5)
Medal record
FC Tokyo
Winner	J.League Cup	2009
Winner	Emperor's Cup	2011
- * Club domestic league appearances and goals

Daishi Hiramatsu (平松 大志, Hiramatsu Daishi; born 3 July 1983) is a former Japanese football player.

== Club statistics ==
Japan			League		Emperor's Cup		League Cup		Total	
Season	Club	League	Apps	Goals	Apps	Goals	Apps	Goals	Apps	Goals
2006	Mito HollyHock	J2 League	13	0	1	0	-		14	0
2007	Mito HollyHock	J2 League	41	0	2	0	-		43	0
2008	Mito HollyHock	J2 League	38	4	2	0	-		40	4
2009	FC Tokyo	J1 League	7	1	3	0	5	0	15	1
2010	FC Tokyo	J1 League								
Career total			99	5	8	0	5	0	112	5
