= Hitoshi Shiota =

Japanese footballer

Hitoshi Shiota 塩田 仁史
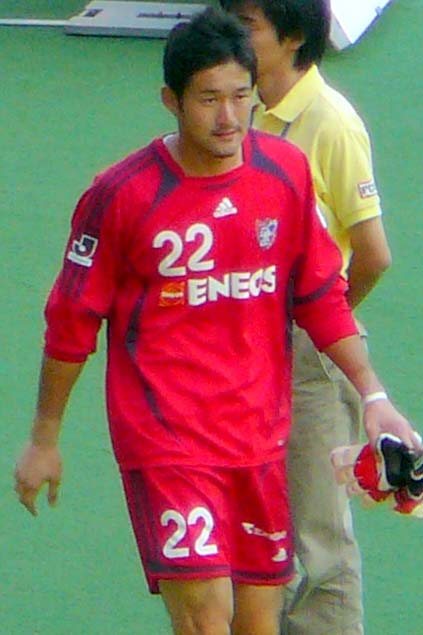

Personal information
- Full name: Hitoshi Shiota
- Date of birth: May 28, 1981 (age 45)
- Place of birth: Hitachi, Ibaraki, Japan
- Height: 1.85 m (6 ft 1 in)
- Position: Goalkeeper

Team information
- Current team: Tochigi SC
- Number: 22

Youth career
- 1997–1999: Mito Junior College High School
- 2000–2003: Ryutsu Keizai University

Senior career*
Years	Team	Apps	(Gls)
2004–2014	FC Tokyo	85	(0)
2015–2019	Omiya Ardija	45	(0)
2020–	Tochigi SC	5	(0)
Medal record
FC Tokyo
Winner	J.League Cup	2004
Winner	J.League Cup	2009
Winner	Emperor's Cup	2011
- * Club domestic league appearances and goals as of 13:40, 19 July 2020 (UTC)

Hitoshi Shiota (塩田 仁史, Shiota Hitoshi; born May 28, 1981) is a Japanese football player who plays for Tochigi SC.

== Club statistics ==
Updated to 23 February 2018.

Club performance			League		Cup		League Cup		Continental		Other^{1}		Total	
Season	Club	League	Apps	Goals	Apps	Goals	Apps	Goals	Apps	Goals	Apps	Goals	Apps	Goals
Japan			League		Emperor's Cup		J.League Cup		AFC		Other		Total	
2004	FC Tokyo	J1 League	0	0	0	0	8	0	-		-		8	0
2005	FC Tokyo	J1 League	0	0	0	0	6	0	-		-		6	0
2006	FC Tokyo	J1 League	2	0	2	0	4	0	-		-		8	0
2007	FC Tokyo	J1 League	20	0	3	0	4	0	-		-		27	0
2008	FC Tokyo	J1 League	34	0	4	0	7	0	-		-		45	0
2009	FC Tokyo	J1 League	0	0	2	0	1	0	-		-		3	0
2010	FC Tokyo	J1 League	4	0	0	0	1	0	-		-		5	0
2011	FC Tokyo	J2 League	18	0	1	0	-		-		-		19	0
2012	FC Tokyo	J1 League	4	0	1	0	4	0	2	0	1	0	12	0
2013	FC Tokyo	J1 League	1	0	4	0	5	0	-		-		10	0
2014	FC Tokyo	J1 League	2	0	0	0	6	0	-		-		8	0
2015	Omiya Ardija	J2 League	5	0	1	0	-		-		-		6	0
2016	Omiya Ardija	J1 League	15	0	3	0	5	0	-		-		23	0
2017	Omiya Ardija	J1 League	9	0	2	0	1	0	-		-		12	0
Career total			114	0	23	0	52	0	2	0	1	0	192	0

^{1}Includes Japanese Super Cup.
