= Sotan Tanabe =

Japanese footballer

Sotan Tanabe 田邉 草民
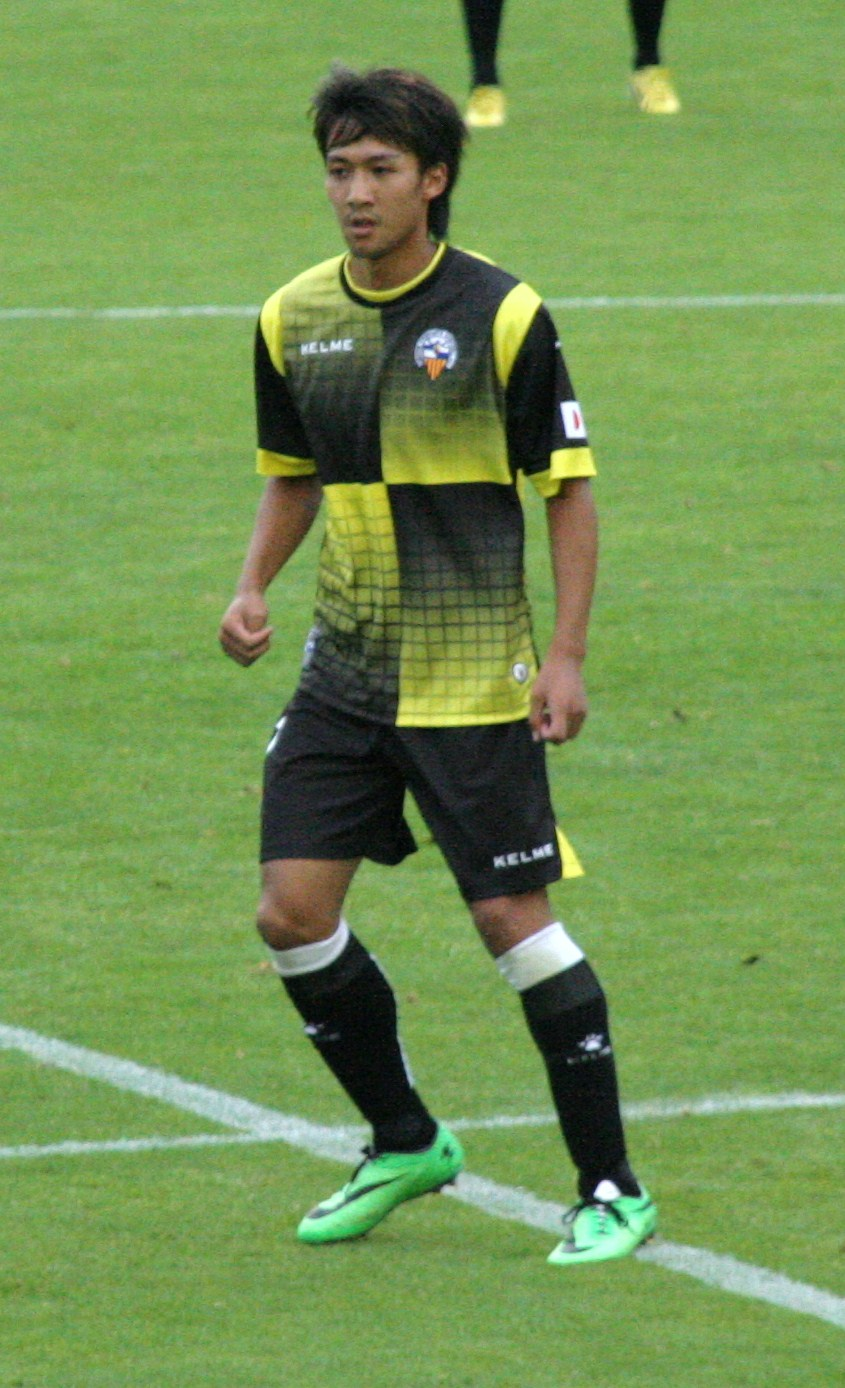

Personal information
- Full name: Sotan Tanabe
- Date of birth: 6 April 1990 (age 36)
- Place of birth: Suginami, Tokyo, Japan
- Height: 1.75 m (5 ft 9 in)
- Position: Winger

Youth career
- 2006–2008: Kokugakuin Kugayama High School

Senior career*
Years	Team	Apps	(Gls)
2009–2018	FC Tokyo	107	(11)
2013–2015	→ Sabadell (loan)	64	(5)
2016—2018	→ FC Tokyo U-23 (loan)	11	(2)
2019–2023	Avispa Fukuoka	107	(2)
Total		289	(20)
Medal record
FC Tokyo
Winner	J.League Cup	2009
Winner	Emperor's Cup	2011
- * Club domestic league appearances and goals

Sotan Tanabe (田邉 草民, Tanabe Sōtan; born 6 April 1990 in Suginami, Tokyo) is a Japanese former footballer who played as a right winger.

== Career statistics ==
=== Club ===
Appearances and goals by club, season and competition
Club	Season	League			National cup (Note: Includes Emperors Cup and Copa del Rey)		League cup (Note: Includes J.League Cup)		Continental		Other		Total	
Club	Season	Division	Apps	Goals	Apps	Goals	Apps	Goals	Apps	Goals	Apps	Goals	Apps	Goals
FC Tokyo	2009	J.League Division 1	10	0	1	0	6	0	0	0	0	0	17	0
FC Tokyo	2010	J.League Division 1	0	0	2	0	1	0	0	0	1 (Note: Appearance in Suruga Bank Championship)	0	4	0
FC Tokyo	2011	J.League Division 2	31	5	4	0	0	0	0	0	0	0	35	5
FC Tokyo	2012	J.League Division 1	18	3	1	0	2	0	3 (Note: Appearances in AFC Champions League Elite)	0	0	0	24	3
FC Tokyo	2013	J.League Division 1	2	0	0	0	3	0	0	0	0	0	5	0
FC Tokyo	2015	J1 League	0	0	0	0	0	0	0	0	0	0	0	0
FC Tokyo	2016	J1 League	24	1	2	0	4	1	4	0	0	0	34	2
FC Tokyo	2017	J1 League	8	1	1	0	6	0	0	0	0	0	15	1
FC Tokyo	2018	J1 League	14	1	2	0	2	0	0	0	0	0	18	1
FC Tokyo	Total		107	11	13	0	24	1	7	0	1	0	152	12
CE Sabadell FC (loan)	2013–14	Segunda División	29	4	0	0	–		–		–		29	4
CE Sabadell FC (loan)	2014–15	Segunda División	35	1	2	0	–		–		–		37	1
CE Sabadell FC (loan)	Total		64	5	2	0	0	0	0	0	0	0	66	5
FC Tokyo U-23 (loan)	2016	J3 League	3	2	–		–		–		–		3	2
FC Tokyo U-23 (loan)	2018	J3 League	8	0	–		–		–		–		8	0
FC Tokyo U-23 (loan)	Total		11	2	0	0	0	0	0	0	0	0	11	2
Avispa Fukuoka	2019	J2 League	34	1	2	0	0	0	–		–		36	1
Avispa Fukuoka	2020	J2 League	20	1	0	0	0	0	–		–		20	1
Avispa Fukuoka	2021	J1 League	27	0	0	0	3	0	–		–		30	0
Avispa Fukuoka	2022	J1 League	22	0	4	0	9	0	–		–		35	0
Avispa Fukuoka	2023	J1 League	4	0	0	0	2	0	–		–		6	0
Avispa Fukuoka	Total		107	2	6	0	14	0	0	0	0	0	127	2
Career total			289	20	21	0	38	1	7	0	1	0	354	21

== Honours ==
=== Club ===
FC Tokyo

- J.League Division 2 (1) : 2011
- Emperor's Cup (1) : 2011
- J.League Cup (2) : 2009, 2023
- Suruga Bank Championship (1) : 2010
