= Masato Morishige =

Japanese footballer

Masato Morishige 森重 真人
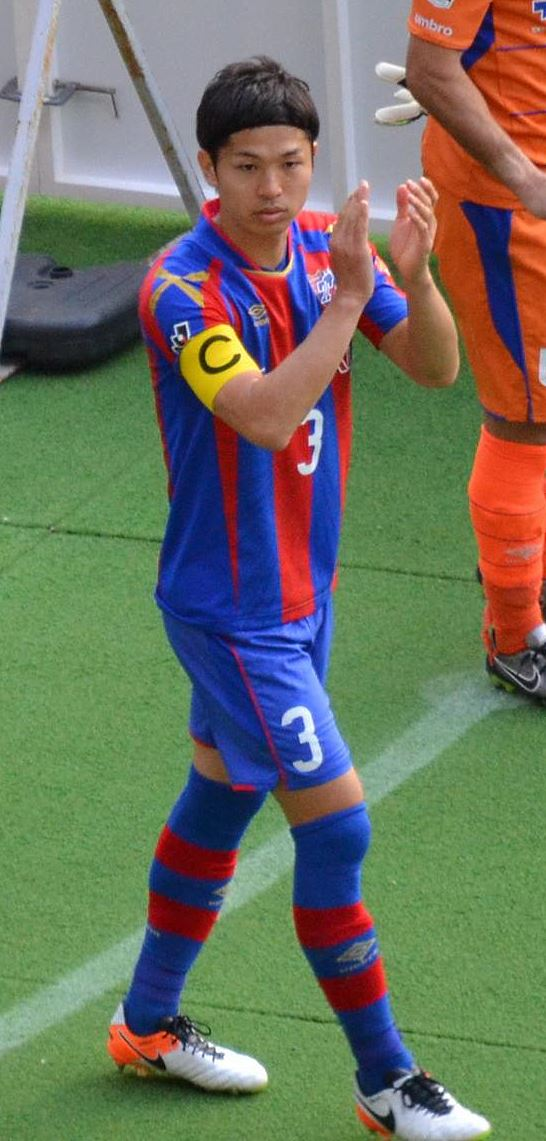
- Morishige with FC Tokyo in 2016

Personal information
- Full name: Masato Morishige
- Date of birth: 21 May 1987 (age 39)
- Place of birth: Asakita-ku, Hiroshima, Japan
- Height: 1.83 m (6 ft 0 in)
- Position: Centre-back

Team information
- Current team: FC Tokyo
- Number: 3

Youth career
- 2000–2002: Sanfrecce Hiroshima
- 2003–2005: Hiroshima Minami High School

Senior career*
Years	Team	Apps	(Gls)
2006–2009	Oita Trinita	73	(5)
2010–	FC Tokyo	469	(37)

International career^{‡}
2007	Japan U-20	3	(0)
2008	Japan U-23	3	(0)
2013–2017	Japan	41	(2)
Medal record
Oita Trinita
Winner	J.League Cup	2008
FC Tokyo
Winner	Emperor's Cup	2011
Representing Japan
AFC U-19 Championship
Silver medal – second place	2006 India
- * Club domestic league appearances and goals as of 13 September 2025 ‡ National team caps and goals as of 13 December 2018, 15:20 (UTC)

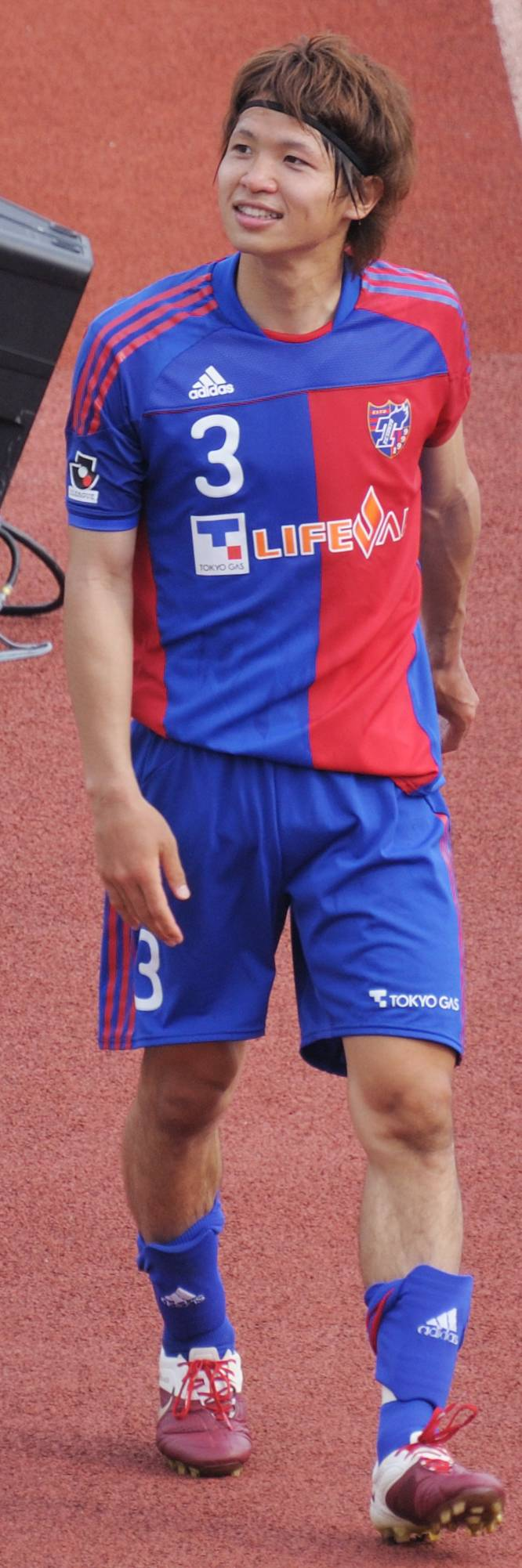
Morishige in 2010

Masato Morishige (森重 真人, Morishige Masato; born 21 May 1987) is a Japanese professional footballer who plays as a centre-back, captain and currently play for J1 League club, FC Tokyo.

== International career ==
In July 2007, Morishige was elected Japan U20 national team for 2007 FIFA U-20 World Cup. At this tournament, he played three matches as defensive midfielder. In August 2008, he was elected Japan U23 national team for 2008 Summer Olympics. At this tournament, he played full time in all three matches as defender.

== Career statistics ==
=== Club ===
As of match played 30 May 2026.

Appearances and goals by club, season and competition
Club	Season	League			Emperor's Cup		J. League Cup		ACL		Other (Note: Includes Pan-Pacific Championship, Suruga Bank Championship and Japanese Super Cup.)		Total	
Club	Season	Division	Apps	Goals	Apps	Goals	Apps	Goals	Apps	Goals	Apps	Goals	Apps	Goals
Oita Trinita	2006	J.League Div 1	2	0	0	0	0	0	—		—		2	0
Oita Trinita	2007	J.League Div 1	20	1	2	1	3	0	—		—		25	2
Oita Trinita	2008	J.League Div 1	28	3	0	0	7	1	—		—		35	4
Oita Trinita	2009	J.League Div 1	23	1	0	0	2	0	—		1	0	26	1
Oita Trinita	Total		73	5	2	1	12	1	—		1	0	88	7
FC Tokyo	2010	J.League Div 1	30	3	5	0	8	1	—		1	0	44	4
FC Tokyo	2011	J.League Div 2	37	6	6	3	—		—		—		43	9
FC Tokyo	2012	J.League Div 1	33	2	1	0	4	0	7	0	1	0	46	2
FC Tokyo	2013	J.League Div 1	33	1	2	0	5	0	—		—		43	1
FC Tokyo	2014	J.League Div 1	33	1	2	1	3	0	—		—		39	1
FC Tokyo	2015	J1 League	32	7	1	0	4	0	—		—		41	7
FC Tokyo	2016	J1 League	32	4	1	0	0	0	8	2	0	0	41	6
FC Tokyo	2017	J1 League	17	1	0	0	4	1	—		—		21	2
FC Tokyo	2018	J1 League	30	2	3	0	0	0	—		—		33	2
FC Tokyo	2019	J1 League	34	2	0	0	4	0	—		—		38	2
FC Tokyo	2020	J1 League	28	1	—		3	0	7	0	—		38	1
FC Tokyo	2021	J1 League	35	4	0	0	6	0	—		—		41	4
FC Tokyo	2022	J1 League	28	2	2	0	3	0	—		—		33	2
FC Tokyo	2023	J1 League	29	0	0	0	5	1	—		—		34	1
FC Tokyo	2024	J1 League	23	0	2	1	3	1	—		—		28	2
FC Tokyo	2025	J1 League	23	1	1	0	1	0	—		—		25	1
FC Tokyo	2026	J1 (100)	3	0	—		—		—		—		3	0
FC Tokyo	Total		480	37	26	5	53	2	22	2	2	0	583	46
Career total			598	42	28	6	65	3	22	2	3	0	671	53

=== International ===
Appearances and goals by national team and year
National team	Year	Apps	Goals
Japan	2013	6	0
Japan	2014	11	1
Japan	2015	12	1
Japan	2016	10	0
Japan	2017	2	0
Total		41	2

Scores and results list Japan's goal tally first, score column indicates score after each Morishige goal.

List of international goals scored by Masato Morishige
No.	Date	Venue	Opponent	Score	Result	Competition
1	5 April 2014	Tokyo, Japan	New Zealand	3–0	4–2	Friendly
2	8 September 2015	Tehran, Iran	Afghanistan	2–0	6–0	2018 FIFA World Cup qualification

== Honours ==
Oita Trinita

- J.League Cup: 2008

FC Tokyo

- Suruga Bank Championship: 2010
- J2 League: 2011
- Emperor's Cup: 2011
- J.League Cup: 2020

Japan

- EAFF East Asian Cup: 2013, 2015

Individual

- J. League Best Eleven: 2013, 2014, 2015, 2016, 2019
