= 2015 FC Tokyo season =

FC Tokyo
2015 season
- Chairman: Toyo Kato
- Manager: Massimo Ficcadenti
- J1 League: 4th
- Emperor's Cup: Quarter-final (vs. Kashima Antlers)
- J. League Cup: Quarter-final (vs. Sanfrecce Hiroshima)
- Top goalscorer: League: Yoshinori Muto (10); All: Yoshinori Muto (12)
- Highest home attendance: 42,604
- Lowest home attendance: 12,727
- Average home league attendance: 28,784
Home colours	Away colours

The 2015 FC Tokyo season was the club's 15th season and the fourth consecutive in the top division of Japanese football. It was Massimo Ficcadenti's second season as manager.

== Squad ==
Note: Flags indicate national team as defined under FIFA eligibility rules; some limited exceptions apply. Players may hold more than one non-FIFA nationality.

No.	Pos.	Nation	Player
1	GK	JPN	Shūichi Gonda
2	DF	JPN	Yuhei Tokunaga
3	DF	JPN	Masato Morishige (captain)
4	MF	JPN	Hideto Takahashi
5	DF	JPN	Yuichi Maruyama
6	DF	JPN	Kosuke Ota
7	MF	JPN	Takuji Yonemoto
8	MF	JPN	Hirotaka Mita
9	FW	JPN	Sota Hirayama
10	MF	JPN	Yohei Kajiyama
13	GK	JPN	Tatsuya Enomoto
16	FW	AUS	Nathan Burns
17	MF	JPN	Hiroki Kawano
18	MF	JPN	Naohiro Ishikawa
19	MF	JPN	Tasuka Hiraoka
20	FW	JPN	Ryoichi Maeda

No.	Pos.	Nation	Player
21	FW	ESP	Francisco Sandaza
22	MF	JPN	Naotake Hanyu
23	FW	JPN	Yohei Hayashi
24	DF	JPN	Wataru Sasaki
25	DF	JPN	Ryota Ogawa
27	MF	JPN	Sotan Tanabe
28	MF	JPN	Shuto Kono
29	DF	JPN	Kazunori Yoshimoto
31	GK	JPN	Kentaro Kakoi
33	MF	JPN	Tatsuki Nara
34	MF	JPN	Hideyuki Nozawa
37	MF	JPN	Kento Hashimoto
38	MF	JPN	Keigo Higashi
39	MF	JPN	Shoya Nakajima
46	GK	SRB	Vlada Avramov
50	DF	JPN	Riku Matsuda

=== Out on loan ===
Note: Flags indicate national team as defined under FIFA eligibility rules; some limited exceptions apply. Players may hold more than one non-FIFA nationality.

No.	Pos.	Nation	Player
—	GK	JPN	Ryotaro Hironaga (at Kataller Toyama)

== Transfers ==
=== Winter ===
In: Note: Flags indicate national team as defined under FIFA eligibility rules; some limited exceptions apply. Players may hold more than one non-FIFA nationality.

No.	Pos.	Nation	Player
5	DF	JPN	Yuichi Maruyama (loan return from (Japan) Shonan Bellmare)
13	GK	JPN	Tatsuya Enomoto (from (Japan) Tochigi SC)
15	FW	TUN	Lassad Nouioui (from (Portugal) Arouca)
20	FW	JPN	Ryoichi Maeda (from (Japan) Jubilo Iwata)
23	FW	JPN	Yohei Hayashi (loan return from (Japan) Oita Trinita)
24	MF	JPN	Wataru Sasaki (promoted from youth team)
25	DF	JPN	Ryota Ogawa (from (Japan) Ryutsu Keizai University)
27	MF	JPN	Shuto Kono (loan return from (Japan) JEF United Chiba)
33	DF	JPN	Tatsuki Nara (loan from (Japan) Consadole Sapporo)
37	MF	JPN	Kento Hashimoto (loan return from (Japan) Roasso Kumamoto)

Out: Note: Flags indicate national team as defined under FIFA eligibility rules; some limited exceptions apply. Players may hold more than one non-FIFA nationality.

No.	Pos.	Nation	Player
1	GK	JPN	Hitoshi Shiota (to (Japan) Omiya Ardija)
5	DF	JPN	Kenichi Kaga (to (Japan) Urawa Reds)
9	FW	JPN	Kazuma Watanabe (to (Japan) Vissel Kobe)
11	FW	BRA	Edu (to (South Korea) Jeonbuk Hyundai Motors)
23	DF	JPN	Kenta Mukuhara (to (Japan) Cerezo Osaka)
—	GK	JPN	Ryotaro Hironaga (to (Japan) Sanfrecce Hiroshima, previously on loan to (Japan) Kataller Toyama)

=== Summer ===
In: Note: Flags indicate national team as defined under FIFA eligibility rules; some limited exceptions apply. Players may hold more than one non-FIFA nationality.

No.	Pos.	Nation	Player
16	FW	AUS	Nathan Burns (from (New Zealand) Wellington Phoenix)
21	FW	ESP	Francisco Sandaza (from (Spain) Girona)
27	MF	JPN	Sotan Tanabe (loan return from (Spain) CE Sabadell)
46	GK	SRB	Vlada Avramov (from (Italy) Torino)

Out: Note: Flags indicate national team as defined under FIFA eligibility rules; some limited exceptions apply. Players may hold more than one non-FIFA nationality.

No.	Pos.	Nation	Player
14	FW	JPN	Yoshinori Muto (to (Germany) Mainz 05)
15	FW	TUN	Lassad Nouioui (to (Tunisia) Club Africain)
30	DF	ITA	Michele Canini (loan return to (Italy) Atalanta)

== Competitions ==
=== J. League ===
==== First stage ====
===== Results summary =====
Overall								Home						Away					
Pld	W	D	L	GF	GA	GD	Pts	W	D	L	GF	GA	GD	W	D	L	GF	GA	GD
17	11	2	4	24	18	+6	35	4	1	3	9	8	+1	7	1	1	15	10	+5

Last updated: 29 June 2015.
Source: see below

===== Results =====
7 March 2015 1	Gamba Osaka	2–2	FC Tokyo	Suita
14:00 JST (UTC+9)	Oh (yellow card) 32'; Patric 45+1'; Usami 52' (pen.); Kurata (yellow card) 90+5'	Report	Muto (yellow card) 18' (goal) 75', 90+1'; Kajiyama (yellow card) 52'; Yonemoto (yellow card) 90+4'	Stadium: Osaka Expo '70 Stadium; Attendance: 18,332; Referee: Takuto Okabe

14 March 2015 2	FC Tokyo	0–0	Yokohama F. Marinos	Tokyo
14:00 JST (UTC+9)		Report		Stadium: Ajinomoto Stadium; Attendance: 30,492; Referee: Yuichi Nishimura

22 March 2015 3	Vissel Kobe	0–2	FC Tokyo	Kobe
16:00 JST (UTC+9)	Jung (yellow card) 37'; Takahashi (yellow card) 86'	Report	Morishige 33'; Muto 68'	Stadium: Noevir Stadium Kobe; Attendance: 21,218; Referee: Toshimitsu Yoshida

4 April 2015 4	FC Tokyo	1–0	Ventforet Kofu	Tokyo
16:00 JST (UTC+9)	Ishikawa 15'; Kajiyama (yellow card) 42'	Report	Arai (yellow card) 28'; Noda (yellow card) 61'; Abe (yellow card) 68'; Hosaka (yellow card) 76'	Stadium: Ajinomoto Stadium; Attendance: 20,743; Referee: Akihiko Ikeuchi

12 April 2015 5	Shonan Bellmare	0–1	FC Tokyo	Hiratsuka
16:00 JST (UTC+9)	Misao (yellow card) 76'	Report	Kawano (yellow card) 45+1'; Canini (yellow card) 57'; Muto 64'; Takahashi (yellow card) 76'	Stadium: Shonan BMW Stadium Hiratsuka; Attendance: 14,581; Referee: Itaru Hirose

18 April 2015 6	FC Tokyo	1–2	Sanfrecce Hiroshima	Tokyo
16:00 JST (UTC+9)	Muto 1'	Report	Shibasaki 11'; Morisaki (yellow card) 36'; Asano 82'	Stadium: Ajinomoto Stadium; Attendance: 24,369; Referee: Yudai Yamamoto

25 April 2015 7	Montedio Yamagata	0–1	FC Tokyo	Tendō
18:30 JST (UTC+9)	Alceu (yellow card) 23'; Frank (yellow card) 73'	Report	Ota 22'; Mita (yellow card) 34'; Kajiyama (yellow card) 78'	Stadium: ND Soft Stadium Yamagata; Attendance: 11,524; Referee: Ryuji Sato

29 April 2015 8	Albirex Niigata	0–1	FC Tokyo	Niigata
14:00 JST (UTC+9)	L.Silva (yellow card) 90+5'; R.Silva (yellow card) 90+5'	Report	Tokunaga (yellow card) 23'; Yoshimoto (yellow card) 55'; Morishige 87'; Mita (yellow card) 90+5'	Stadium: Denka Big Swan Stadium; Attendance: 22,318; Referee: Hiroyuki Kimura

2 May 2015 9	FC Tokyo	2–1	Kawasaki Frontale	Tokyo
16:00 JST (UTC+9)	Yoshimoto (yellow card) 32'; Hanyu (yellow card) 46'; Morishige (yellow card) 47'; Ota 71'; Higashi (yellow card) 79'; Muto 88'	Report	Ōkubo 21'; Oshima (yellow card) 22'; Kurumaya (yellow card) 29' (yellow-red card) 64'	Stadium: Ajinomoto Stadium; Attendance: 42,604; Referee: Minoru Tojo

6 May 2015 10	Vegalta Sendai	2–3	FC Tokyo	Sendai
19:00 JST (UTC+9)	Futami (yellow card) 47'; Ishikawa 89'; Lopes 90'	Report	Maeda (yellow card) 6'; Yoshimoto (yellow card) 24'; Morishige 34'; Muto 48' (pen.), 52'; Tokunaga (yellow card) 90+5'	Stadium: Yurtec Stadium Sendai; Attendance: 14,368; Referee: Kenji Ogiya

10 May 2015 11	FC Tokyo	0–1	Kashima Antlers	Tokyo
16:00 JST (UTC+9)	Yonemoto (yellow card) 60'; Higashi (yellow card) 79'; Ota (yellow card) 83'; Canini (yellow card) 89'	Report	Doi 34'	Stadium: Ajinomoto Stadium; Attendance: 42,070; Referee: Yuichi Nishimura

16 May 2015 12	Urawa Red Diamonds	4–1	FC Tokyo	Midori-ku
15:30 JST (UTC+9)	Lee 5'; Sekine 42'; Muto 47'; Umesaki 77'	Report	Morishige (yellow card) 55'; Higashi (yellow card) 57'; Canini (yellow card) 64'; Maeda 74'	Stadium: Saitama Stadium 2002; Attendance: 42,995; Referee: Nobutsugu Murakami

23 May 2015 13	FC Tokyo	0–1	Nagoya Grampus	Tokyo
19:00 JST (UTC+9)	Tokunaga (yellow card) 39'	Report	Morishige 73' (o.g.); Isomura (yellow card) 79' (yellow-red card) 84'	Stadium: Ajinomoto Stadium; Attendance: 23,460; Referee: Futoshi Nakamura

30 May 2015 14	FC Tokyo	2–1	Kashiwa Reysol	Tokyo
19:00 JST (UTC+9)	Mita 33'; Morishige (yellow card) 60'; Muto 69' (pen.)	Report	Leandro 62' (pen.); Cristiano (yellow card) 66'; Eduardo (yellow card) 90'	Stadium: Ajinomoto Stadium; Attendance: 23,439; Referee: Kazuyoshi Enomoto

7 June 2015 15	Matsumoto Yamaga	1–2	FC Tokyo	Matsumoto
16:00 JST (UTC+9)	Sakai (yellow card) 28'; Iwama (yellow card) 32'; Okubo 63'	Report	Hashimoto 26'; Takahashi (yellow card) 43'; Muto 45+3'; Yoshimoto (yellow card) 90+4'	Stadium: Matsumotodaira Football Stadium; Attendance: 17,617; Referee: Kenji Ogiya

20 June 2015 16	Sagan Tosu	1–2	FC Tokyo	Tosu
16:00 JST (UTC+9)	Kim 17'; Hayashi (yellow card) 74'	Report	Nakajima 69'; Morishige 75' (pen.)	Stadium: Tosu Stadium; Attendance: 16,871; Referee: Hiroyoshi Takayama

27 June 2015 17	FC Tokyo	3–2	Shimizu S-Pulse	Tokyo
19:00 JST (UTC+9)	Higashi 38'; Maeda 60', 66'	Report	Omae 50'; Kaneko (yellow card) 54'; Ishige 82' (yellow card) 84'	Stadium: Ajinomoto Stadium; Attendance: 41,363; Referee: Yudai Yamamoto

===== League table =====
Pos	Team	Pld	W	D	L	GF	GA	GD	Pts	Qualification
1	Urawa Red Diamonds (Q)	17	12	5	0	39	17	+22	41	Qualification to J.League Championship Stage
2	FC Tokyo	17	11	2	4	24	18	+6	35	
3	Sanfrecce Hiroshima	17	10	4	3	29	16	+13	34	

Updated to match(es) played on 27 June 2015. Source: Meiji Yasuda J1 League Standings
Rules for classification: 1) Points; 2) Goal difference; 3) Goals scored
(Q) Qualified for the phase indicated

==== Second stage ====
===== Results summary =====
Overall								Home						Away					
Pld	W	D	L	GF	GA	GD	Pts	W	D	L	GF	GA	GD	W	D	L	GF	GA	GD
17	8	4	5	21	15	+6	28	5	2	2	16	9	+7	3	2	3	5	6	−1

Last updated: 23 November 2015.
Source: see below

===== Results =====
11 July 2015 1	Kawasaki Frontale	2–0	FC Tokyo	Kawasaki
18:30 JST (UTC+9)	Elsinho (yellow card) 48' (goal) 52'; Renatinho 75'	Report	Yoshimoto (yellow card) 73'	Stadium: Todoroki Athletics Stadium; Attendance: 23,793; Referee: Ryuji Sato

15 July 2015 2	FC Tokyo	3–1	Albirex Niigata	Tokyo
19:00 JST (UTC+9)	Higashi 9'; Takahashi 49' (yellow card) 65'; Morishige 78' (yellow card) 90+4'; Tokunaga (yellow card) 85'; Nakajima (yellow card) 88'	Report	Fitzgerald (yellow card) 61'; L.Silva 90+5' (pen.)	Stadium: Ajinomoto Stadium; Attendance: 12,727; Referee: Shoichiro Mikami

19 July 2015 3	FC Tokyo	0–0	Montedio Yamagata	Tokyo
19:00 JST (UTC+9)	Nakajima (yellow card) 3'; Sandaza (yellow card) 61'; Takahashi (yellow card) 72'; Morishige (yellow card) 75'	Report		Stadium: Ajinomoto Stadium; Attendance: 22,175; Referee: Akihiko Ikeuchi

25 July 2015 4	Kashima Antlers	2–1	FC Tokyo	Kashima
18:30 JST (UTC+9)	Shibasaki 30' (yellow card) 90'; Yamamoto (yellow card) 72'; Shoji 82'	Report	Yonemoto 33'; Kawano (yellow card) 50'; Burns 70'; Takahashi (yellow card) 71'	Stadium: Kashima Soccer Stadium; Attendance: 17,804; Referee: Nobutsugu Murakami

29 July 2015 5	FC Tokyo	3–1	Vegalta Sendai	Tokyo
19:00 JST (UTC+9)	Morishige 9'; Maeda 23', 34'; Gonda (yellow card) 84'	Report	Kanakubo 68'	Stadium: Ajinomoto Stadium; Attendance: 16,635; Referee: Koichiro Fukushima

12 August 2015 6	Ventforet Kofu	0–1	FC Tokyo	Kōfu
19:00 JST (UTC+9)	Matsumoto (yellow card) 77'	Report	Takahashi 62'	Stadium: Yamanashi Chuo Bank Stadium; Attendance: 12,164; Referee: Hajime Matsuo

16 August 2015 7	FC Tokyo	2–1	Gamba Osaka	Tokyo
18:00 JST (UTC+9)	Yonemoto 15'; Morishige (yellow card) 55'; Burns 59'; Mita (yellow card) 81'	Report	Patric 47'; Konno (yellow card) 50'	Stadium: Ajinomoto Stadium; Attendance: 37,978; Referee: Kenji Ogiya

22 August 2015 8	Nagoya Grampus	0–0	FC Tokyo	Nagoya
19:00 JST (UTC+9)	Isomura (yellow card) 82'	Report	Takahashi (yellow card) 57'; Sandaza (yellow card) 75'	Stadium: Mizuho Athletic Stadium; Attendance: 19,011; Referee: Yoshiro Imamura

29 August 2015 9	Shimizu S-Pulse	1–1	FC Tokyo	Shizuoka
18:00 JST (UTC+9)	Jong 50'	Report	Maeda (yellow card) 62'; Takahashi (yellow card) 67'; Ota 70'; Nakajima (yellow card) 75'	Stadium: IAI Stadium Nihondaira; Attendance: 14,954; Referee: Toshimitsu Yoshida

12 September 2015 10	FC Tokyo	3–0	Vissel Kobe	Tokyo
19:00 JST (UTC+9)	Takahashi (yellow card) 33'; Kawano (yellow card) 44'; Maeda 38', 69', 78'	Report	Mihara (yellow card) 11'	Stadium: Ajinomoto Stadium; Attendance: 22,328; Referee: Hajime Matsuo

19 September 2015 11	Yokohama F. Marinos	1–0	FC Tokyo	Yokohama
19:00 JST (UTC+9)	Saitō (yellow card) 29'; Togashi 88'	Report		Stadium: Nissan Stadium; Attendance: 30,999; Referee: Hiroyuki Kimura

26 September 2015 12	FC Tokyo	1–0	Matsumoto Yamaga	Tokyo
18:30 JST (UTC+9)	Sandaza (yellow card) 8'; Maeda 19'; Hanyu (yellow card) 90'	Report	Ando (yellow card) 34'; Tanaka (yellow card) 74'	Stadium: Ajinomoto Stadium; Attendance: 36,671; Referee: Yoshiro Imamura

3 October 2015 13	Sanfrecce Hiroshima	0–1	FC Tokyo	Hiroshima
19:00 JST (UTC+9)		Report	Ota (yellow card) 39'; Takahashi (yellow card) 41'; Kawano 70'	Stadium: Hiroshima Big Arch; Attendance: 18,810; Referee: Toshimitsu Yoshida

17 October 2015 14	FC Tokyo	1–2	Shonan Bellmare	Tokyo
14:00 JST (UTC+9)	Higashi 50' (yellow card) 82'; Ota (yellow card) 60'	Report	Kobayashi 45+1'; D.Kikuchi 55'; S.Kikuchi (yellow card) 73'; Takayama (yellow card) 85'	Stadium: Ajinomoto Stadium; Attendance: 22,577; Referee: Koichiro Fukushima

24 October 2015 15	FC Tokyo	3–4	Urawa Red Diamonds	Tokyo
14:00 JST (UTC+9)	Higashi 17'; Morishige (yellow card) 41'; Takahashi 74', 85'	Report	Kashiwagi 12' (yellow card) 38'; Muto 14'; Sekine 27'; Makino 62'; Moriwaki (yellow card) 79'	Stadium: Ajinomoto Stadium; Attendance: 38,952; Referee: Ryuji Sato

7 November 2015 16	Kashiwa Reysol	0–1	FC Tokyo	Kashiwa
14:00 JST (UTC+9)	Taketomi (yellow card) 39'; Eduardo (yellow card) 59'	Report	Morishige 16' (pen.); Tokunaga (yellow card) 52'; Avramov (yellow card) 53'; Maruyama (yellow card) 90+5'	Stadium: Hitachi Kashiwa Soccer Stadium; Attendance: 12,497; Referee: Kenji Ogiya

22 November 2015 17	FC Tokyo	0–0	Sagan Tosu	Tokyo
15:30 JST (UTC+9)	Maruyama (yellow card) 59'	Report	Yoshida (yellow card) 61'	Stadium: Ajinomoto Stadium; Attendance: 30,753; Referee: Yudai Yamamoto

===== League table =====
Pos	Team	Pld	W	D	L	GF	GA	GD	Pts
5	Yokohama F. Marinos	17	8	5	4	24	15	+9	29
6	FC Tokyo	17	8	4	5	21	15	+6	28
7	Kawasaki Frontale	17	8	3	6	30	22	+8	27

Updated to match(es) played on 22 November 2015. Source: Meiji Yasuda J1 League 2nd Stage Standings
Rules for classification: 1) Points; 2) Goal difference; 3) Goals scored

==== Overall ====
Pos	Team	Pld	W	D	L	GF	GA	GD	Pts	Qualification or relegation
2	Urawa Red Diamonds	34	21	9	4	69	40	+29	72	Champions League group stage and J.League Championship 1st Round
3	Gamba Osaka	34	18	9	7	56	37	+19	63	Champions League group stage and J.League Championship 1st Round
4	FC Tokyo	34	19	6	9	45	33	+12	63	Champions League qualifying play-off (Note: The winner of the 2015 Emperor's Cup qualified for the Group Stage of the 2016 AFC Champions League. Since the Emperor's Cup winner was Gamba Osaka who were the third-placed team, the qualifying play-off spot was awarded to the fourth-placed team.)
5	Kashima Antlers	34	18	5	11	57	41	+16	59	
6	Kawasaki Frontale	34	17	6	11	62	48	+14	57	

Updated to match(es) played on 28 November 2015. Source: Meiji Yasuda J1 League Standings
Rules for classification: 1) Points; 2) Goal difference; 3) Goals scored

=== J. League Cup ===
==== Group stage ====
18 March 2015 1	FC Tokyo	2–1	Albirex Niigata	Tokyo
19:00 JST (UTC+9)	Ishikawa 65'; Hayashi 78'; Hanyu (yellow card) 81'	Report	Yamamoto 2'	Stadium: Ajinomoto Stadium; Attendance: 9,476; Referee: Kazuyoshi Enomoto

28 March 2015 2	Matsumoto Yamaga	1–1	FC Tokyo	Matsumoto
16:00 JST (UTC+9)	Maeda 33' (o.g.); Goto (yellow card) 56'; Sakai (yellow card) 73'	Report	Higashi 57'	Stadium: Matsumotodaira Football Stadium; Attendance: 13,870; Referee: Masuya Ueda

22 April 2015 4	FC Tokyo	2–0	Sagan Tosu	Tokyo
19:00 JST (UTC+9)	Mita 18', 57'	Report	Okamoto (yellow card) 25'; Choi (yellow card) 79'	Stadium: Ajinomoto Stadium; Attendance: 8,583; Referee: Hajime Matsuo

20 May 2015 5	FC Tokyo	2–1	Ventforet Kofu	Tokyo
19:00 JST (UTC+9)	Muto 41', 90+4'	Report	Morita (yellow card) 53'; Matsumoto (yellow card) 74' (goal) 85'; Arai (yellow card) 79'	Stadium: Ajinomoto Stadium; Attendance: 8,699; Referee: Masaaki Iemoto

27 May 2015 6	Sanfrecce Hiroshima	1–1	FC Tokyo	Hiroshima
19:00 JST (UTC+9)	Shimizu (yellow card) 57' (goal) 79'; Shiotani (yellow card) 90+2'	Report	Hayashi 90+1'	Stadium: Hiroshima Big Arch; Attendance: 6,701; Referee: Hiroyuki Kimura

3 June 2015 7	Shonan Bellmare	0–0	FC Tokyo	Hiratsuka
19:00 JST (UTC+9)		Report	Maruyama (yellow card) 83'; Morishige (yellow card) 85'	Stadium: Shonan BMW Stadium Hiratsuka; Attendance: 6,582; Referee: Nobutsugu Murakami

==== Knockout stage ====
2 September 2015 Quarter-final 1st leg	FC Tokyo	2–2	Kashima Antlers	Tokyo
19:00 JST (UTC+9)	Kawano 15'; Ota (yellow card) 28'; Nara (yellow card) 75'; Nakajima 88'	Report	Akasaki 43'; Endo 61'; Kanazaki (yellow card) 81'	Stadium: Ajinomoto Stadium; Attendance: 10,443; Referee: Masaaki Iemoto

6 September 2015 Quarter-final 2nd leg	Kashima Antlers	3–0 (5–2 agg.)	FC Tokyo	Kashima
18:30 JST (UTC+9)	Kanazaki 7', 60'; Ogasawara (yellow card) 71'; Endo 90+5'	Report	Nakajima (yellow card) 85'	Stadium: Kashima Soccer Stadium; Attendance: 8,568; Referee: Minoru Tojo

=== Emperor's Cup ===
14 November 2015 Fourth Round	FC Tokyo	2–0	Mito HollyHock	Tokyo
19:00 JST (UTC+9)	Maeda 14'; Hashimoto 57'	Report		Stadium: Ajinomoto Stadium; Attendance: 7,294; Referee: Shinji Murakami

26 December 2015 Quarterfinal	FC Tokyo	1–2 (a.e.t.)	Sanfrecce Hiroshima	Isahaya
15:00 JST (UTC+9)	Higashi (yellow card) 13' (yellow-red card) 66' (goal) 37'; Maeda (yellow card) 56'; Morishige (yellow card) 95' (yellow-red card) 114'	Report	Asano 85', 103'; Shiotani (yellow card) 89'; Morisaki (yellow card) 92'	Stadium: Nagasaki Athletic Stadium; Attendance: 9,933; Referee: Minoru Tōjō

== Squad statistics ==
As of match played 22 November 2015

=== Appearances and goals ===
No.	Pos	Nat	Player	Total		J-League		J-League Cup		Emperor's Cup	
No.	Pos	Nat	Player	Apps	Goals	Apps	Goals	Apps	Goals	Apps	Goals
1	GK	(Japan) JPN	Shūichi Gonda	27	0	22	0	5	0	0	0
2	DF	(Japan) JPN	Yūhei Tokunaga	42	0	33	0	7	0	2	0
3	DF	(Japan) JPN	Masato Morishige	37	6	32	6	4	0	1	0
4	MF	(Japan) JPN	Hideto Takahashi	39	4	20+9	4	8	0	2	0
5	DF	(Japan) JPN	Yuichi Maruyama	27	0	15+5	0	6	0	1	0
6	DF	(Japan) JPN	Kosuke Ota	38	3	30	3	6	0	2	0
7	MF	(Japan) JPN	Takuji Yonemoto	38	1	31	1	5	0	2	0
8	MF	(Japan) JPN	Hirotaka Mita	25	4	8+10	2	4+2	2	1	0
9	FW	(Japan) JPN	Sōta Hirayama	4	0	0+2	0	0+2	0	0	0
10	MF	(Japan) JPN	Yōhei Kajiyama	18	0	18	0	0	0	0	0
13	GK	(Japan) JPN	Tatsuya Enomoto	9	0	4	0	3	0	2	0
16	FW	(Australia) AUS	Nathan Burns	11	2	7+3	2	0	0	0+1	0
17	MF	(Japan) JPN	Hiroki Kawano	29	2	21+1	1	2+3	1	1+1	0
18	MF	(Japan) JPN	Naohiro Ishikawa	13	2	6+4	1	2+1	1	0	0
20	FW	(Japan) JPN	Ryoichi Maeda	38	10	23+7	9	4+2	0	2	1
21	FW	(Spain) ESP	Francisco Sandaza	9	0	3+5	0	0+1	0	0	0
22	MF	(Japan) JPN	Naotake Hanyu	32	0	18+7	0	3+3	0	0+1	0
23	FW	(Japan) JPN	Yohei Hayashi	17	2	3+8	0	3+2	2	0+1	0
29	DF	(Japan) JPN	Kazunori Yoshimoto	25	0	15+4	0	5	0	1	0
33	MF	(Japan) JPN	Tatsuki Nara	3	0	0	0	2	0	1	0
34	MF	(Japan) JPN	Hideyuki Nozawa	4	0	2+1	0	1	0	0	0
37	MF	(Japan) JPN	Kento Hashimoto	19	3	7+6	2	1+3	0	1+1	1
38	MF	(Japan) JPN	Keigo Higashi	35	6	18+7	4	7+1	1	2	1
39	MF	(Japan) JPN	Shoya Nakajima	17	3	1+12	2	2	1	1+1	0
46	GK	(Serbia) SRB	Vlada Avramov	8	0	8	0	0	0	0	0
50	DF	(Japan) JPN	Riku Matsuda	11	0	4+5	0	2	0	0	0
Players who left FC Tokyo during the season:
14	FW	(Japan) JPN	Yoshinori Muto	21	12	17	10	4	2	0	0
15	FW	(Tunisia) TUN	Lassad Nouioui	4	0	1+1	0	1+1	0	0	0
30	DF	(Italy) ITA	Michele Canini	8	0	7	0	1	0	0	0

=== Goal Scorers ===
Place	Position	Nation	Number	Name	J-League	J-League Cup	Emperor's Cup	Total
1	FW	(Japan)	14	Yoshinori Muto	10	2	0	12
2	FW	(Japan)	20	Ryoichi Maeda	9	0	1	10
3	DF	(Japan)	3	Masato Morishige	6	0	0	6
3	FW	(Japan)	38	Keigo Higashi	4	1	1	6
5	MF	(Japan)	4	Hideto Takahashi	4	0	0	4
5	MF	(Japan)	8	Hirotaka Mita	2	2	0	4
7	DF	(Japan)	6	Kosuke Ota	3	0	0	3
8	FW	(Australia)	16	Nathan Burns	2	0	0	2
8	MF	(Japan)	18	Naohiro Ishikawa	1	1	0	2
8	FW	(Japan)	17	Hiroki Kawano	1	1	0	2
8	MF	(Japan)	39	Shoya Nakajima	1	1	0	2
8	MF	(Japan)	37	Kento Hashimoto	1	0	1	2
8	FW	(Japan)	23	Yohei Hayashi	0	2	0	2
14	MF	(Japan)	7	Takuji Yonemoto	1	0	0	1
				TOTALS	45	10	3	58

=== Disciplinary record ===
Number	Nation	Position	Name	J-League		J. League Cup		Emperor's Cup		Total	
Number	Nation	Position	Name	Yellow card	Red card	Yellow card	Red card	Yellow card	Red card	Yellow card	Red card
1	(Japan)	GK	Shūichi Gonda	1	0	0	0	0	0	1	0
2	(Japan)	DF	Yūhei Tokunaga	5	0	0	0	0	0	5	0
3	(Japan)	DF	Masato Morishige	7	0	1	0	2	1	10	1
4	(Japan)	MF	Hideto Takahashi	9	0	0	0	0	0	9	0
5	(Japan)	DF	Yuichi Maruyama	2	0	1	0	0	0	3	0
6	(Japan)	MF	Kosuke Ota	3	0	1	0	0	0	4	0
7	(Japan)	MF	Takuji Yonemoto	2	0	0	0	0	0	2	0
8	(Japan)	MF	Hirotaka Mita	3	0	0	0	0	0	3	0
10	(Japan)	MF	Yōhei Kajiyama	3	0	0	0	0	0	3	0
14	(Japan)	FW	Yoshinori Muto	1	0	0	0	0	0	1	0
17	(Japan)	FW	Hiroki Kawano	3	0	0	0	0	0	3	0
20	(Japan)	FW	Ryoichi Maeda	2	0	0	0	1	0	3	0
21	(Spain)	FW	Francisco Sandaza	3	0	0	0	0	0	3	0
22	(Japan)	MF	Naotake Hanyu	2	0	1	0	0	0	3	0
29	(Japan)	DF	Kazunori Yoshimoto	5	0	0	0	0	0	5	0
30	(Italy)	DF	Michele Canini	3	0	0	0	0	0	3	0
33	(Japan)	MF	Tatsuki Nara	0	0	1	0	0	0	1	0
38	(Japan)	MF	Keigo Higashi	4	0	0	0	2	1	6	1
39	(Japan)	MF	Shoya Nakajima	3	0	1	0	0	0	4	0
46	(Serbia)	GK	Vlada Avramov	1	0	0	0	0	0	1	0
			TOTALS	62	0	6	0	5	2	73	2
