= 2013 FC Tokyo season =

FC Tokyo
2013 season
- Chairman: Yutaka Murabayashi
- Manager: Ranko Popović
- J. League: 8th
- Emperor's Cup: Semi-final
- J. League Cup: Group stage
- Top goalscorer: League: Watanabe (17); All: Watanabe (19)
Home colours	Away colours

The 2013 FC Tokyo season was FC Tokyo's second season back in the J. League Division 1 since the unexpected relegation in the 2010 season. They also competed in the 2013 J. League Cup and 2013 Emperor's Cup.

== Trophies balance ==
Trophy	Started round	First match	Result	Last match
J. League	3rd	2 March 2013	8th	7 December 2013
Emperor's Cup	Second Round	7–8 September 2013	Semi-final	29 December 2013
J. League Cup	Group stage	20 March 2013	Group stage	15 May 2013

=== Competitive Balance ===
Biggest win
	Home				Away			
J. League	9 March 2013	Matchday 2	v. Kashiwa Reysol	3 – 0	28 September 2013	Matchday 27	v. Omiya Ardija	2 – 5
Emperor's Cup	7 September 2013	Second Round	v. Yokogawa Musashino	1 – 0	13 October 2013	Third Round	JEF United Ichihara Chiba	5 – 6(pen.)
J. League Cup	15 May 2013	Matchday 6	v. Albirex Niigata	2 – 1	23 March 2013	Matchday 2	v. Kashima Antlers	2 – 4
Biggest loss
J. League	5 October 2013	Matchday 28	v. Kashima Antlers	1 – 4	30 November 2013	Matchday 33	v. Kashiwa Reysol	4 – 1
Emperor's Cup	29 December 2013	Semifinals	v. Sanfrecce Hiroshima	4 – 5(pen.)	None registered			
J. League Cup	None registered				10 April 2013	Matchday 4	v. Cerezo Osaka	2 – 1

== Winter transfers ==
=== In ===
(substituted on) In (3 players)
Player	From
(Japan) Hideyuki Nozawa	Promoted from youth team
(Japan) Hirotaka Mita	(Japan) Meiji University
(Japan) Keigo Higashi	(Japan) Omiya Ardija

=== Out ===
(substituted off) Out (2 players)
Player	New Team
(Japan) Satoshi Tokizawa	(Japan) Montedio Yamagata
(Japan) Kohei Shimoda	(Japan) V-Varen Nagasaki

=== Loan in ===
(substituted on) Loan in (1 players)
Player	Team
(Japan) Tadanari Lee	(England) Southampton F.C.

=== Loan out ===
(substituted off) Loan out (6 players)
Player	Team
(Japan) Kenta Mukuhara	(Japan) Cerezo Osaka
(Japan) Yohei Kajiyama	(Greece) Panathinaikos F.C.
(Japan) Naotake Hanyu	(Japan) Ventforet Kofu
(Japan) Shuto Kono	(Japan) V-Varen Nagasaki
(Japan) Kentaro Shigematsu	(Japan) Ehime F.C.
(Brazil) Roberto César	(South Korea) Ulsan Hyundai F.C.

=== Loan return ===
(substituted on) Loan return (2 players)
Player	From
(Japan) Takumi Abe	(Japan) Yokohama F.C.
(Japan) Kazunori Yoshimoto	(Japan) Mito HollyHock

=== Loan end ===
(substituted off) Loan end (1 players)
Player	Returns to
(Brazil) Edmilson	(Qatar) Al-Gharafa Sports Club

== Current squad ==
As of February 14, 2013 Note: Flags indicate national team as defined under FIFA eligibility rules; some limited exceptions apply. Players may hold more than one non-FIFA nationality.

No.	Pos.	Nation	Player
1	GK	JPN	Hitoshi Shiota
2	DF	JPN	Yuhei Tokunaga
3	DF	JPN	Masato Morishige
4	DF	JPN	Hideto Takahashi
5	DF	JPN	Kenichi Kaga
6	DF	JPN	Kosuke Ota
7	MF	JPN	Takuji Yonemoto
8	MF	JPN	Aria Jasuru Hasegawa
9	FW	JPN	Kazuma Watanabe
11	FW	JPN	Tadanari Lee (on loan from Southampton)
13	FW	JPN	Sota Hirayama
14	MF	JPN	Hokuto Nakamura
15	DF	JPN	Daishi Hiramatsu
16	DF	JPN	Yuichi Maruyama
17	MF	JPN	Hiroki Kawano

No.	Pos.	Nation	Player
18	MF	JPN	Naohiro Ishikawa
19	MF	JPN	Yohei Otake
20	GK	JPN	Shuichi Gonda
21	GK	JPN	Ryotaro Hironaga
23	FW	JPN	Yohei Hayashi
26	DF	JPN	Takumi Abe
27	MF	JPN	Sotan Tanabe
29	DF	JPN	Kazunori Yoshimoto
30	DF	KOR	Jang Hyun-Soo
32	MF	SRB	Nemanja Vučićević
34	MF	JPN	Hideyuki Nozawa
34	MF	JPN	Hirotaka Mita
37	MF	JPN	Kento Hashimoto
38	MF	JPN	Keigo Higashi
49	FW	BRA	Lucas

== Match stats ==
- Updated to 29 December 2013

No.	Pos.	Player	Goal			Booked			(yellow card) (yellow-red card)			Sent off (straight red)		
No.	Pos.	Player	JL	EC	LC	JL	EC	LC	JL	EC	LC	JL	EC	LC
2	DF	(Japan) Yūhei Tokunaga	1	1		3	1							
3	DF	(Japan) Masato Morishige	1	1		6								
4	MF	(Japan) Hideto Takahashi	2			5								
5	DF	(Japan) Kenichi Kaga				6								
6	DF	(Japan) Kosuke Ota	3	4		3								
7	MF	(Japan) Takuji Yonemoto	1	2		7	1							
8	MF	(Japan) Aria Jasuru Hasegawa	5	1		3								
9	FW	(Japan) Kazuma Watanabe	17	1	1	4	1	1						
11	FW	(Japan) Tadanari Lee	4		2									
13	FW	(Japan) Sōta Hirayama	5	2		1	2	2						
16	DF	(Japan) Yuichi Maruyama					1							
18	MF	(Japan) Naohiro Ishikawa	1		1	1								
20	GK	(Japan) Shuichi Gonda				2								
23	FW	(Japan) Yohei Hayashi		1										
30	DF	(South Korea) Jang Hyun-Soo	3*	1		4	2	1						
32	MF	(Serbia) Nemanja Vučićević	3			3								
36	MF	(Japan) Hirotaka Mita	2	1	1									
38	MF	(Japan) Keigo Higashi	2		1	5	1							
49	FW	(Brazil) Lucas Severino	11	2	1	3		1						

(*) One Own-Goal

== Match results ==
=== Pre-season ===
==== Friendly matches ====
16 February 2013	Sagan Tosu (Japan)	1–2	(Japan) FC Tokyo	(Japan) Tosu
14:01 JST	Roni 31'	(Report)	(yellow card) 16' Ota; (yellow card) 49' Jang Hyun-Soo; 75' Kawano; 80' Watanabe	Stadium: Best Amenity Stadium; Attendance: 5,292; Referee: Yudai Yamamoto

24 February 2013	Thespa Kusatsu (Japan)	0–1	(Japan) FC Tokyo	(Japan) Maebashi
13:04 JST	Tada (yellow card) 13'	(Report)	(yellow card) 79' Kaga; 81' Ota	Stadium: Shikishima Stadium; Attendance: 2,814; Referee: Kenji Ogiya

=== J. League ===
Matchday	1	2	3	4	5	6	7	8	9	10	11	12	13	14	15	16	17	18	19	20	21	22	23	24	25	26	27	28	29	30	31	32	33	34
Against	OIT	KSR	CRZ	YOK	OMI	VEG	NAG	KAW	SAG	JÚB	BEL	SHI	KAS	SAN	URA	ALB	KOF	SHI	OIT	KAW	YOK	JÚB	SAG	SAN	URA	NAG	OMI	KAS	ALB	KOF	CRZ	BEL	KSR	VEG
Venue	A	H	A	A	H	A	H	H	A	H	A	H	A	H	A	A	H	A	H	A	H	A	H	A	H	A	A	H	H	A	H	H	A	H
Position	3	2	4	7	9	12	9	6	5	5	7	7	7	8	9	8	8	8	6	7	9	8	12	10	8	6	5	7	7	6	7	7	8	8

Win Draw Lost

		All							Home							Away						
		Pts	W	D	L	F	A	Dif.	Pts	W	D	L	F	A	Dif.	Pts	W	D	L	F	A	Dif.
8	FC Tokyo	54	16	6	12	61	47	+14	31	10	1	6	31	20	+11	23	6	5	6	30	27	+3

J. League Winner (also qualified for 2014 AFC Champions League Group Stage)
2014 AFC Champions League Group Stage
Relegation to J. League 2

2 March 2013 1	Oita Trinita	1–2	FC Tokyo	Ōita
19:04 JST	Choi 17'	(Report)	26' Watanabe; 57' Aria	Stadium: Ōita Stadium; Attendance: 17,055; Referee: Masaaki Iemoto

9 March 2013 2	FC Tokyo	3–0	Kashiwa Reysol	Tokyo
14:04 JST	Watanabe 6', 28'; Aria 78'	(Report)	(yellow card) 8' Masushima; (yellow card) 88' Leandro Domingues	Stadium: Ajinomoto Stadium; Attendance: 26,256; Referee: Toshimitsu Yoshida

16 March 2013 3	Cerezo Osaka	1–0	FC Tokyo	Osaka
15:04 JST	Edno (yellow card) 27'; Yamaguchi 47'; Kim Jin-Hyeon (yellow card) 90+2'	(Report)	(yellow card) 90+5' Higashi; (yellow card) after the match' Gonda	Stadium: Nagai Stadium; Attendance: 13,702; Referee: Ryuji Sato

30 March 2013 4	Yokohama F. Marinos	3–2	FC Tokyo	Yokohama
19:04 JST	Nakamura 61'; Fujita 68', 90'	(Report)	27' Lee; 82' Watanabe; (yellow card) 83' Yonemoto	Stadium: Nissan Stadium; Attendance: 23,698; Referee: Itaru Hirose

6 April 2013 5	FC Tokyo	0–1	Omiya Ardija	Tokyo
14:03 JST	Takahashi (yellow card) 57'	(Report)	(yellow card) 56' Watanabe; 78' Zlatan	Stadium: Ajinomoto Stadium; Attendance: 13,859; Referee: Takuya Maeda

13 April 2013 6	Vegalta Sendai	2–1	FC Tokyo	Sendai
14:04 JST	Sugai (yellow card) 37'; Kakuda 47'; Wilson 60'; Kamata (yellow card) 60'	(Report)	79' Lee; (yellow card) 90+1' Kaga	Stadium: Yurtec Stadium Sendai; Attendance: 13,655; Referee: Minoru Tojo

20 April 2013 7	FC Tokyo	3–1	Nagoya Grampus	Tokyo
14:04 JST	Morishige (yellow card) 8'; Takahashi (yellow card) 22'; Ota (yellow card) 39'; Lucas 45+4', 51', (yellow card) 52'; Watanabe 59'; Kaga (yellow card) 79'	(Report)	30' Kennedy; (yellow card) 45+3' Honda; (yellow card) 50' Tanaka; (yellow card) 65' Danilson; (yellow card) 72' (yellow-red card) 85' Taguchi; (yellow card) 81' Kennedy; (yellow card) 87' Masukawa	Stadium: Ajinomoto Stadium; Attendance: 16,804; Referee: Tomohiro Inoue

27 April 2013 8	FC Tokyo	2–0	Kawasaki Frontale	Tokyo
19:04 JST	Lucas 22'; Higashi 65'	(Report)	(yellow card) 26' Saneto	Stadium: Ajinomoto Stadium; Attendance: 26,555; Referee: Yudai Yamamoto

3 May 2013 9	Sagan Tosu	2–3	FC Tokyo	Tosu
18:04 JST	Kim Min-Woo (yellow card) 56'; Toyoda 77'; Mizunuma 90+1'	(Report)	28' Higashi; 46', 49', (yellow card) 73' Watanabe; (yellow card) 76' Kaga	Stadium: Best Amenity Stadium; Attendance: 14,024; Referee: Itaru Hirose

6 May 2013 10	FC Tokyo	2–2	Júbilo Iwata	Tokyo
15:03 JST	Higashi (yellow card) 15'; Ishikawa 73'; Lee 90+3'	(Report)	29', (yellow card) 63' Inoha; 40' Kobayashi	Stadium: Ajinomoto Stadium; Attendance: 28,565; Referee: Takuto Okabe

11 May 2013 11	Shonan Bellmare	3–2	FC Tokyo	Hiratsuka
17:04 JST	Takayama 11'; Baba 65'; Nagaki (yellow card) 53', (goal) 82'	(Report)	54' Ota; 57' Watanabe; (yellow card) 61' Jang Hyun-Soo	Stadium: Shonan BMW Stadium Hiratsuka; Attendance: 8,248; Referee: Yoshiro Imamura

18 May 2013 12	FC Tokyo	2–0	Shimizu S-Pulse	Tokyo
19:04 JST	Takahashi 53'; Lucas 61'	(Report)	(yellow card) 77' Baré; (yellow card) 90+3' Lee Ki-Je	Stadium: Ajinomoto Stadium; Attendance: 24,003; Referee: Nobutsugu Murakami

25 May 2013 13	Kashima Antlers	3–2	FC Tokyo	Kashima
17:05 JST	Endo (yellow card) 33'; Osako 47', 65'; Jang Hyun-Soo 56' (o.g.)	(Report)	7' Lee; 44' Watanabe; (yellow card) 55' Morishige; (yellow card) 62' Jang Hyun-Soo	Stadium: Kashima Soccer Stadium; Attendance: 17,969; Referee: Jumpei Iida

6 July 2013 14	FC Tokyo	0–1	Sanfrecce Hiroshima	Tokyo
18:34 JST	Kaga (yellow card) 47'; Yonemoto (yellow card) 58'	(Report)	(yellow card) 45+1' Mizumoto; (yellow card) 90' Mikić; 90+4' Park Hyung-Jin	Stadium: Ajinomoto Stadium; Attendance: 27,852; Referee: Kenji Ogiya

10 July 2013 15	Urawa Red Diamonds	2–2	FC Tokyo	Saitama
19:35 JST	Hirakawa (yellow card) 50'; Márcio Richardes (yellow card) 58'; Koroki 81'; Haraguchi 86'	(Report)	11' Mita; (yellow card) 34', (goal) 56' Aria; (yellow card) 69' Morishige	Stadium: Saitama Stadium 2002; Attendance: 25,638; Referee: Hiroyuki Kimura

13 July 2013 16	Albirex Niigata	0–3	FC Tokyo	Niigata
19:03 JST		(Report)	3' Takahashi; 10' Watanabe; (yellow card) 40' Morishige; (yellow card) 44' Higashi; (yellow card) 48' Ota; (yellow card) 53' Aria; 88' Lucas; (yellow card) 90+4' Tokunaga	Stadium: Tohoku Denryoku Big Swan Stadium; Attendance: 26,547; Referee: Koichiro Fukushima

17 July 2013 17	FC Tokyo	4–1	Ventforet Kofu	Tokyo
19:34 JST	Lucas 18'; Vučićević (yellow card) 61', (goal) 82'; Watanabe 69', 89'	(Report)	1' Hiramoto; (yellow card) 49' Tsuchiya	Stadium: Ajinomoto Stadium; Attendance: 12,905; Referee: Yuichi Nishimura

31 July 2013 18	Shimizu S-Pulse	0–0	FC Tokyo	Shimizu
19:05 JST	Lee Ki-Je (yellow card) 63' (yellow-red card)	(Report)	(yellow card) 71' Watanabe; (yellow card) 90+2' Yonemoto	Stadium: IAI Stadium Nihondaira; Attendance: 10,781; Referee: Toshimitsu Yoshida

3 August 2013 19	FC Tokyo	2–0	Oita Trinita	Tokyo
19:04 JST	Higashi (yellow card) 28'; Watanabe 37', 47'	(Report)	(yellow card) 39' Kim Jeong-Hyun	Stadium: Ajinomoto Stadium; Attendance: 22,309; Referee: Hiroyoshi Takayama

10 August 2013 20	Kawasaki Frontale	2–2	FC Tokyo	Kawasaki
19:04 JST	Renato (yellow card) 15'; Ōkubo 33'; Nakamura 46'; Moriya (yellow card) 63'; Alan (yellow card) 90+5'	(Report)	(yellow card) 23' Morishige; 39' Watanabe; (yellow card) 45' Aria; 56' Ota	Stadium: Todoroki Athletics Stadium; Attendance: 17,864; Referee: (Poland) Marciniak Szymon

17 August 2013 21	FC Tokyo	0–2	Yokohama F. Marinos	Tokyo
18:34 JST		(Report)	31' Hyōdō; (yellow card) 53' Marquinhos; (yellow card) 59' Tomisawa; 89' Nakamura	Stadium: Ajinomoto Stadium; Attendance: 30,698; Referee: Jumpei Iida

24 August 2013 22	Júbilo Iwata	0–0	FC Tokyo	Iwata
19:04 JST	Carlinhos (yellow card) 26'; Fujita (yellow card) 64'; Hatta (yellow card) 76'	(Report)	(yellow card) 13' Yonemoto; (yellow card) 80' Kaga	Stadium: Yamaha Stadium; Attendance: 12,809; Referee: Masaaki Iemoto

28 August 2013 23	FC Tokyo	2–3	Sagan Tosu	Tokyo
19:04 JST	Tokunaga (yellow card) 66'; Hirayama 81', (yellow card) 89'; Watanabe 84'	(Report)	40', 85' Toyoda; 41', (yellow card) 61' Ikeda; (yellow card) 73' Hayashi	Stadium: National Olympic Stadium; Attendance: 19,666; Referee: Hajime Matsuo

31 August 2013 24	Sanfrecce Hiroshima	1–2	FC Tokyo	Hiroshima
19:06 JST	Satō 62'; Ishihara (yellow card) 78'; Chiba (yellow card) 90+1'	(Report)	16' Watanabe; (yellow card) 40', (goal) 81' Yonemoto; (yellow card) 57' Lucas	Stadium: Hiroshima Big Arch; Attendance: 13,896; Referee: Minoru Tojo

14 September 2013 25	FC Tokyo	3–2	Urawa Red Diamonds	Tokyo
18:35 JST	Jang Hyun-Soo 8'; Higashi (yellow card) 25'; Yonemoto (yellow card) 32'; Morishige 36'; Hirayama 90'	(Report)	(yellow card) 37' Koroki; 51' Makino; 53' Nasu; (yellow card) 62' Ugajin; (yellow card) 64' Nasu	Stadium: National Olympic Stadium; Attendance: 34,756; Referee: Toshimitsu Yoshida

21 September 2013 26	Nagoya Grampus	0–2	FC Tokyo	Nagoya
19:04 JST	Ogawa (yellow card) 23'	(Report)	38' Aria; 88' Vučićević; (yellow card) 90+2' Gonda	Stadium: Mizuho Athletic Stadium; Attendance: 13,329; Referee: Futoshi Nakamura

28 September 2013 27	Omiya Ardija	2–5	FC Tokyo	Saitama
19:04 JST	Watanabe 13'; Novaković 37'; Wada (yellow card) 64'	(Report)	7', 45+2', 66' Lucas; (yellow card) 84' Tokunaga; 90' Mita; 90+4' Hirayama	Stadium: NACK5 Stadium; Attendance: 11,539; Referee: Nobutsugu Murakami

5 October 2013 28	FC Tokyo	1–4	Kashima Antlers	Tokyo
19:04 JST	Kaga (yellow card) 45+2'; Takahashi (yellow card) 46'; Hirayama 83'	(Report)	6' Endo; 9' Davi; 67' Ogasawara; 81' Osako	Stadium: National Olympic Stadium; Attendance: 30,673; Referee: Itaru Hirose

19 October 2013 29	FC Tokyo	2–0	Albirex Niigata	Tokyo
17:04 JST	Ota 53'; Watanabe (yellow card) 78'; Lucas 79'	(Report)	(yellow card) 51' Michael	Stadium: Ajinomoto Stadium; Attendance: 21,743; Referee: Hiroyuki Kimura

27 October 2013 30	Ventforet Kofu	1–1	FC Tokyo	Kōfu
13:04 JST	Hiramoto 28', (yellow card) 55'; Yamamoto (yellow card) 68'	(Report)	(yellow card) 21' Morishige; (yellow card) 21' Takahashi; 80' Tokunaga	Stadium: Yamanashi Chuo Bank Stadium; Attendance: 14,414; Referee: Minoru Tojo

10 November 2013 31	FC Tokyo	1–2	Cerezo Osaka	Tokyo
13:05 JST	Aria 70'; Lucas (yellow card) 80'; Jang Hyun-Soo (yellow card) 84'; Ota (yellow card) 90'	(Report)	31' Minamino; (yellow card) 74' Yamaguchi; 87' Kakitani	Stadium: Ajinomoto Stadium; Attendance: 40,371; Referee: Toshimitsu Yoshida

23 November 2013 32	FC Tokyo	2–1	Shonan Bellmare	Tokyo
17:03 JST	Jang Hyun-Soo 68'; Vučićević 90+2', (yellow card) 90+3'	(Report)	(yellow card) 60' Kikuchi; 66' Takayama	Stadium: Ajinomoto Stadium; Attendance: 21,648; Referee: Ryuji Sato

30 November 2013 33	Kashiwa Reysol	4–1	FC Tokyo	Kashiwa
17:03 JST	Tanaka 39', 45+3', 87'; Kurisawa (yellow card) 42'; Kudo 46'; Kondo (yellow card) 52'	(Report)	(yellow card) 45+1' Jang Hyun-Soo; 83' Ishikawa	Stadium: Kashiwa Soccer Stadium; Attendance: 13,930; Referee: Itaru Hirose

7 December 2013 34	FC Tokyo	2–0	Vegalta Sendai	Tokyo
15:33 JST	Vučićević (yellow card) 39'; Lucas 53'; Takahashi (yellow card) 70'; Hirayama 90+2'	(Report)	(yellow card) 55' Watanabe; (yellow card) 80' Ryang Yong-Gi	Stadium: Ajinomoto Stadium; Attendance: 27,583; Referee: Futoshi Nakamura

=== J. League Cup ===
==== Group stage ====
===== Group B =====
Team	Pld	W	D	L	GF	GA	GD	Pts
Cerezo Osaka	6	4	1	1	10	7	+3	13
Kashima Antlers	6	4	0	2	8	7	+1	12
FC Tokyo	6	2	3	1	7	5	+2	9
Nagoya Grampus	6	2	3	1	6	5	+1	9
Oita Trinita	6	1	3	2	6	7	−1	6
Sagan Tosu	6	1	1	4	6	8	−2	4
Albirex Niigata	6	1	1	4	6	10	−4	4

20 March 2013 1	FC Tokyo	0–0	Sagan Tosu	Tokyo
14:04 JST		(Report)	(yellow card) 10' Kanai; (yellow card) 90+1' Sueyoshi	Stadium: Komazawa Olympic Stadium; Attendance: 11,039; Referee: Yuichi Nishimura

23 March 2013 2	Kashima Antlers	2–4	FC Tokyo	Kashima
16:00 JST	Endo (yellow card) 27'; Osako 28'; Davi 78'; Maeno (yellow card) 89'	(Report)	(yellow card) 19', (goal) 57' Lucas; 45+1' Watanabe; 77' Lee; 81' Higashi	Stadium: Kashima Soccer Stadium; Attendance: 11,839; Referee: Yudai Yamamoto

3 April 2013 3	FC Tokyo	0–0	Nagoya Grampus	Tokyo
19:04 JST	Hirayama (yellow card) 72'	(Report)	(yellow card) 85' Tanaka	Stadium: Ajinomoto Stadium; Attendance: 9,900; Referee: Hajime Matsuo

10 April 2013 4	Cerezo Osaka	2–1	FC Tokyo	Osaka
19:05 JST	Kakitani 55'; Simplício 69'; Edno (yellow card) 77'; Bando (yellow card) 89' (yellow-red card) 90+2'	(Report)	61' Lee; (yellow card) 64' Watanabe	Stadium: Nagai Stadium; Attendance: 7,296; Referee: Yosuke Kubota

24 April 2013 5	Oita Trinita	0–0	FC Tokyo	Ōita
19:00 JST	Hayashi (yellow card) 33'; Choi Jung-Han (yellow card) 67'; Kijima (yellow card) 80'	(Report)	(yellow card) 64' Hirayama; (yellow card) 79' Jang Hyun-Soo	Stadium: Ōita Stadium; Attendance: 4,623; Referee: Jumpei Iida

15 May 2013 6	FC Tokyo	2–1	Albirex Niigata	Tokyo
19:04 JST	Ishikawa 51'; Mita 82'	(Report)	(yellow card) 55' Hamada; 65' Okamoto; (yellow card) 86' Homma; (yellow card) 90+1' Tanaka	Stadium: National Olympic Stadium; Attendance: 12,724; Referee: Masaaki Iemoto

=== Emperor's Cup ===
==== Second Round ====
7 September 2013 Match Nº48	FC Tokyo	1–0 (a.e.t.)	Yokogawa Musashino	Tokyo
16:00 JST	Jang Hyun-Soo (yellow card) 81'; Maruyama (yellow card) 92'; Hirayama 105+3', (yellow card) 120+1'	(Report)	(yellow card) 26' Iizuka; (yellow card) 55' Iwata; (yellow card) 78' Ono	Stadium: Ajinomoto Stadium; Attendance: 7,469; Referee: Takuto Okabe

==== Third Round ====
13 October 2013 Match Nº68	JEF United Ichihara Chiba	1–1 (a.e.t.) (5–6 p)	FC Tokyo	Chiba
19:04 JST	Yonekura (yellow card) 40'; Machida (yellow card) 75'; Fukai 90'	(Report)	(yellow card) 36' Yonemoto; 41' (pen.) Lucas; (yellow card) 71' Watanabe; (yellow card) 90+3' Tokunaga	Stadium: Fukuda Denshi Arena; Attendance: 9,347; Referee: Yoshiro Imamura
	Penalties
	Yamaguchi (penalty scored); Fukai (penalty scored); Yonekura (penalty scored); Takeuchi (penalty missed); Otsuka (penalty scored); Yazawa (penalty missed); Sato (penalty scored); Takahashi (penalty missed)		(penalty scored) Lucas; (penalty scored) Ota; (penalty scored) Hirayama; (penalty missed) Kawano; (penalty scored) Aria; (penalty missed) Takahashi; (penalty scored) Yonemoto; (penalty scored) Tokunaga

==== Fourth Round ====
16 November 2013 Match Nº78	Omiya Ardija	0–3	FC Tokyo	Saitama
19:03 JST	Kataoka (yellow card) 88'	(report)	45+1' Mita; 54' Watanabe; 82' Ota	Stadium: NACK5 Stadium; Attendance: 8,434; Referee: Hiroyoshi Takayama

==== Quarterfinals ====
22 December 2013 Match Nº83	Vegalta Sendai	1–2	FC Tokyo	Sendai
13:04 JST	Wilson 3'; Kakuda (yellow card) 117'	(report)	(yellow card) 74' Higashi; 90+3' Ota; (yellow card) 115' Hirayama; 120' Hayashi	Stadium: Yurtec Stadium Sendai; Attendance: 15,018; Referee: Masaaki Iemoto

==== Semifinals ====
29 December 2013 Match Nº86	FC Tokyo	0–0 (a.e.t.) (4–5 p)	Sanfrecce Hiroshima	Tokyo
15:04 JST	Jang Hyun-Soo (yellow card) 40'	(report)		Stadium: National Olympic Stadium; Attendance: 26,709; Referee: Nobutsugu Murakami
	Penalties
	Ota (penalty scored); Morishige (penalty scored); Jang Hyun-Soo (penalty scored); Mita (penalty missed); Aria (penalty missed); Yonemoto (penalty scored); Ishikawa (penalty missed)		(penalty missed) Aoyama; (penalty scored) Mizumoto; (penalty missed) Chiba; (penalty scored) Nishikawa; (penalty scored) Shiotani; (penalty scored) Asano; (penalty scored) Notsuda
