= 2016 FC Tokyo season =

FC Tokyo
2016 season
- Manager: Hiroshi Jofuku; Yoshiyuki Shinoda
- Stadium: Ajinomoto Stadium
- J1 League: 10th
- Emperor's Cup: Quarter-finals
- J.League Cup: Semi-finals
- Top goalscorer: League: Ryoichi Maeda (6); All: Ryoichi Maeda (9)
Home colours	Away colours

The 2016 FC Tokyo season was the club's 16th year in existence and fifth consecutive season in the J1 League.

== Players ==
=== Senior squad ===
Note: Flags indicate national team as defined under FIFA eligibility rules; some limited exceptions apply. Players may hold more than one non-FIFA nationality.

No.	Pos.	Nation	Player
2	DF	JPN	Yuhei Tokunaga
3	DF	JPN	Masato Morishige (captain)
4	MF	JPN	Hideto Takahashi
5	DF	JPN	Yuichi Maruyama
6	DF	JPN	Sei Muroya
7	MF	JPN	Takuji Yonemoto
9	FW	JPN	Sota Hirayama
10	MF	JPN	Yohei Kajiyama
13	GK	JPN	Tatsuya Enomoto
14	MF	KOR	Ha Dae-sung
16	FW	AUS	Nathan Burns
17	MF	JPN	Hiroki Kawano
18	MF	JPN	Naohiro Ishikawa
19	MF	JPN	Tasuku Hiraoka
20	FW	JPN	Ryoichi Maeda
22	MF	JPN	Naotake Hanyu

No.	Pos.	Nation	Player
23	FW	JPN	Yohei Hayashi
24	DF	JPN	Wataru Sasaki
25	DF	JPN	Ryoya Ogawa
26	DF	JPN	Takahiro Yanagi
27	MF	JPN	Sotan Tanabe
28	MF	JPN	Shuto Kono
29	DF	JPN	Kazunori Yoshimoto
31	GK	JPN	Kentaro Kakoi
32	MF	KOR	Yu In-soo
34	MF	JPN	Hideyuki Nozawa
37	MF	JPN	Kento Hashimoto
38	MF	JPN	Keigo Higashi
39	MF	JPN	Shoya Nakajima
44	FW	JPN	Takuma Abe
47	GK	JPN	Yota Akimoto
48	MF	JPN	Kota Mizunuma
50	DF	JPN	Yuichi Komano

=== Out on loan ===
Note: Flags indicate national team as defined under FIFA eligibility rules; some limited exceptions apply. Players may hold more than one non-FIFA nationality.

No.	Pos.	Nation	Player
—	GK	JPN	Shuichi Gonda (at SV Horn)
—	MF	JPN	Hirotaka Mita (at Vegalta Sendai)

== J1 League ==
=== League table ===
Pos	Team	Pld	W	D	L	GF	GA	GD	Pts
8	Júbilo Iwata	17	6	5	6	21	23	−2	23
9	FC Tokyo	17	6	5	6	16	18	−2	23
10	Vegalta Sendai	17	7	2	8	20	25	−5	23

Source: 2016 MEIJI YASUDA J1 LEAGUE 1st Stage League table
Rules for classification: 1) Points; 2) Goal difference; 3) Goals scored.

Pos	Team	Pld	W	D	L	GF	GA	GD	Pts
8	Sagan Tosu	17	8	5	4	26	22	+4	29
9	FC Tokyo	17	9	2	6	23	21	+2	29
10	Sanfrecce Hiroshima	17	8	2	7	26	22	+4	26

Source: 2016 MEIJI YASUDA J1 LEAGUE 2nd Stage League table
Rules for classification: 1) Points; 2) Goal difference; 3) Goals scored.

Pos	Team	Pld	W	D	L	GF	GA	GD	Pts
8	Kashiwa Reysol	34	15	9	10	52	44	+8	54
9	FC Tokyo	34	15	7	12	39	39	0	52
10	Yokohama F. Marinos	34	13	12	9	53	38	+15	51

Source: Meiji Yasuda J1 League
Rules for classification: 1) Points; 2) Goal difference; 3) Goals scored.

=== Matches ===
Match	Date	Team	Score	Team	Venue	Attendance
1-1	2016.02.27	FC Tokyo	0-1	Omiya Ardija	Ajinomoto Stadium	25,776
1-2	2016.03.06	Vegalta Sendai	1-2	FC Tokyo	Yurtec Stadium Sendai	16,918
1-3	2016.03.11	FC Tokyo	1-0	Vissel Kobe	Ajinomoto Stadium	11,488
1-4	2016.03.19	Kashima Antlers	2-0	FC Tokyo	Kashima Soccer Stadium	15,996
1-5	2016.04.02	FC Tokyo	3-2	Nagoya Grampus	Ajinomoto Stadium	20,249
1-6	2016.04.10	Kashiwa Reysol	1-0	FC Tokyo	Hitachi Kashiwa Stadium	10,470
1-7	2016.04.16	FC Tokyo	2-4	Kawasaki Frontale	Ajinomoto Stadium	29,208
1-8	2016.04.24	Ventforet Kofu	1-1	FC Tokyo	Yamanashi Chuo Bank Stadium	12,123
1-9	2016.04.29	FC Tokyo	0-1	Avispa Fukuoka	Ajinomoto Stadium	23,625
1-11	2016.05.08	Shonan Bellmare	0-1	FC Tokyo	Shonan BMW Stadium Hiratsuka	13,029
1-12	2016.05.13	FC Tokyo	0-0	Sagan Tosu	Ajinomoto Stadium	13,046
1-14	2016.05.29	FC Tokyo	1-0	Gamba Osaka	Ajinomoto Stadium	37,805
1-15	2016.06.11	Júbilo Iwata	0-0	FC Tokyo	Shizuoka Stadium	20,969
1-10	2016.06.15	FC Tokyo	1-1	Sanfrecce Hiroshima	Ajinomoto Stadium	15,358
1-16	2016.06.18	FC Tokyo	1-1	Albirex Niigata	Ajinomoto Stadium	24,793
1-13	2016.06.22	Urawa Reds	3-2	FC Tokyo	Saitama Stadium 2002	24,368
1-17	2016.06.25	Yokohama F. Marinos	0-1	FC Tokyo	Nissan Stadium	21,240
2-1	2016.07.02	Sagan Tosu	3-2	FC Tokyo	Best Amenity Stadium	9,858
2-2	2016.07.09	FC Tokyo	1-0	Ventforet Kofu	Ajinomoto Stadium	17,978
2-3	2016.07.13	Avispa Fukuoka	2-1	FC Tokyo	Level5 Stadium	6,497
2-4	2016.07.17	FC Tokyo	0-1	Kashiwa Reysol	Ajinomoto Stadium	22,374
2-5	2016.07.23	Kawasaki Frontale	1-0	FC Tokyo	Kawasaki Todoroki Stadium	24,103
2-6	2016.07.30	Albirex Niigata	0-1	FC Tokyo	Denka Big Swan Stadium	23,510
2-7	2016.08.06	FC Tokyo	3-2	Júbilo Iwata	Ajinomoto Stadium	28,291
2-8	2016.08.13	Vissel Kobe	4-1	FC Tokyo	Noevir Stadium Kobe	13,419
2-9	2016.08.20	FC Tokyo	1-0	Yokohama F. Marinos	Ajinomoto Stadium	27,880
2-10	2016.08.27	Nagoya Grampus	1-1	FC Tokyo	Toyota Stadium	14,379
2-11	2016.09.10	FC Tokyo	3-0	Shonan Bellmare	Ajinomoto Stadium	18,744
2-12	2016.09.17	FC Tokyo	1-3	Urawa Reds	Ajinomoto Stadium	33,493
2-13	2016.09.25	Gamba Osaka	3-3	FC Tokyo	Suita City Football Stadium	30,141
2-14	2016.10.01	Sanfrecce Hiroshima	0-1	FC Tokyo	Edion Stadium Hiroshima	14,975
2-15	2016.10.22	FC Tokyo	2-1	Kashima Antlers	Ajinomoto Stadium	37,317
2-16	2016.10.29	FC Tokyo	1-0	Vegalta Sendai	Ajinomoto Stadium	21,198
2-17	2016.11.03	Omiya Ardija	0-1	FC Tokyo	NACK5 Stadium Omiya	12,377
