= Shōya Nakajima =

Japanese footballer

Shōya Nakajima 中島 翔哉
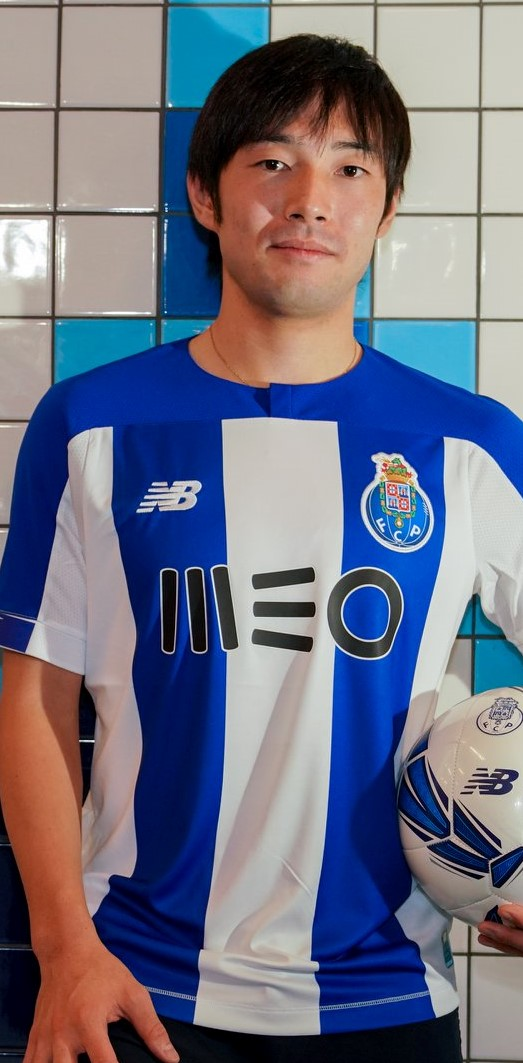
- Nakajima with Porto in 2019

Personal information
- Full name: Shoya Nakajima
- Date of birth: 23 August 1994 (age 32)
- Place of birth: Hachiōji, Japan
- Height: 1.64 m (5 ft 5 in)
- Positions: Winger; second striker

Team information
- Current team: Portimonense
- Number: 10

Youth career
- 2001–2003: Matsugaya FC
- 2004–2012: Tokyo Verdy

Senior career*
Years	Team	Apps	(Gls)
2012–2013	Tokyo Verdy	29	(6)
2014–2018	FC Tokyo	51	(6)
2014	→ Kataller Toyama (loan)	28	(2)
2017–2018	→ Portimonense (loan)	29	(10)
2018–2019	Portimonense	13	(5)
2019	Al-Duhail	7	(1)
2019–2022	Porto	20	(0)
2021	→ Al Ain (loan)	2	(0)
2021–2022	→ Portimonense (loan)	22	(1)
2022–2023	Antalyaspor	15	(0)
2023–2026	Urawa Red Diamonds	56	(3)
2026–	Portimonense	2	(0)

International career
2011	Japan U17	2	(1)
2013	Japan U20	4	(3)
2014–2016	Japan U23	30	(19)
2018–2019	Japan	19	(5)
Medal record
Representing Japan
AFC U-23 Championship
Gold medal – first place	2016 Qatar
- * Club domestic league appearances and goals as of 12 September 2026

Shōya Nakajima (中島 翔哉, Nakajima Shōya; born 23 August 1994) is a Japanese professional footballer who plays for Liga Portugal 2 club Portimonense. Primarily a left winger, he has also played on the right flank and as a central second striker.

After starting his career with Tokyo Verdy of the J2 League and FC Tokyo of the J1 League, he spent several years in Portugal's Primeira Liga with Portimonense and Porto. He also had brief spells in Qatar, the United Arab Emirates and Turkey.

He was part of the Japanese under-23 team at the 2016 Olympics. First capped at senior level in 2018, he was part of the Japan team at the 2019 Copa América.

== Club career ==
=== Portimonense ===
On 27 August 2017, Nakajima moved abroad for the first time, signing a season-long loan with Portimonense of Portugal's Primeira Liga. After scoring 10 goals and as many assists in 32 total matches for the team from the Algarve, he signed a permanent deal in May 2018.

=== Al Duhail ===
In February 2019, Nakajima joined Qatar Stars League side Al Duhail for a reported transfer fee of €35 million. He played seven games for the eventual runners-up, and scored once in a 6–0 home win over Al Ahli on 28 February.

=== Porto ===
On 5 July 2019, Porto announced an agreement with Al-Duhail for the acquisition of Nakajima's sports rights, in a €12 million transfer fee (50% of the player economic rights). He signed a five-year contract, keeping him contractually linked until 30 June 2024, with an €80 million release clause.

Nakajima made his Porto debut on 13 August 2019 in the second leg of the UEFA Champions League third qualifying round away to Krasnodar, playing the full 90 minutes of a 3–2 loss that eliminated the team on the away goals rule. He scored his first goal on 19 December 2019, the only one of a home win over Santa Clara in the fifth round of the Taça de Portugal, his 17th appearance. On 16 January 2021, Nakajima joined Al Ain of the UAE Pro League on a six-month loan deal including an optional €40 million transfer clause. After his time in the Middle East was ended by a tibia break, on 25 August that year he returned on loan to Portimonense for a season.

=== Antalyaspor ===
Nakajima signed for Turkish club Antalyaspor in 2022. He made his debut on 18 September 2022 against Adana Demirspor, coming on the 59th minute only to be sent off in just 20 seconds after receiving a red card for a late sliding tackle.

=== Urawa Red Diamonds ===
On 25 July 2023, J1 League side Urawa Red Diamonds announced the signing of Nakajima. The duration of the contract was undisclosed.

=== Return to Portimonense ===
In August 2026, Nakajima returned to Portimonense, now in Liga Portugal 2.

== International career ==
=== Youth level and under-23 career ===
Nakajima was first selected to represent the Japanese under-17 national team when he was called up to the Slovakia Cup, a friendly tournament in early May 2011 that served the purpose of preparing the squad for the FIFA U-17 World Cup. A month later, he was in Mexico playing at the 2011 U-17 World Cup, where he appeared in two matches and scored one goal in a 3–2 loss against Brazil in the quarter-finals. In August 2013, Nakajima was called for the Japanese under-20 national team (Note: The Japanese under-20 national team comprises the U-19 and U-20 youth categories.) to participate in the L'Alcúdia International Football Tournament in Spain. The squad was eliminated in the group stage, and he scored in a 2–1 win against Argentina.

In January 2014, Nakajima played for the Japanese under-23 national team (Note: The Japanese under-23 national team comprises the U-21, U-22 and U-23 youth categories.) in the 2013 AFC U-22 Championship. He appeared in all three matches of the group stage, scoring once against Iran and twice against Australia, as the team reached the quarter-finals. In September 2014, Nakajima was called for the 2014 Asian Games, scoring against Iraq and Nepal in the group stage. The team reached the quarter-finals.

In March 2015, he played two matches in the AFC U-23 Championship qualification and scored a double against Vietnam. The team reached the first place of the group and was granted the qualification for the 2016 AFC U-23 Championship. In January 2016, he participated in the championship, scoring a double in the extra-time of the quarter-finals match against Iraq and eventually won the competition with a 3–2 triumph against South Korea. Nakajima was also crown the Most Valuable Player of the Tournament.

In August 2016, he was selected for the Japanese Olympic national team (under-23) that competed in the 2016 Summer Olympics in Rio de Janeiro. He played three matches and scored a goal against Colombia, while the team came third in the group stage.

=== Senior career ===
On 15 March 2018, Nakajima was called by national manager Vahid Halilhodžić for upcoming matches against Mali and Ukraine. Eight days later, he debuted and scored his first goal for Japan national team against Mali in a 1–1 draw.

Hajime Moriyasu named Nakajima in the squad for the 2019 Copa América in Brazil, which Japan guest entered with a mainly under-23 team. He scored the opening goal against Ecuador in the last group game in Belo Horizonte, but the 1–1 draw eliminated the team.

== Career statistics ==
=== Club ===
As of match played 25 August 2023

Appearances and goals by club, season and competition
Club	Season	League			National cup (Note: Includes the Emperor's Cup, Taça de Portugal and Qatar Emir Cup)		League cup (Note: Includes the J.League Cup and Taça da Liga)		Continental		Total	
Club	Season	Division	Apps	Goals	Apps	Goals	Apps	Goals	Apps	Goals	Apps	Goals
Tokyo Verdy	2012	J2 League	8	4	2	0	0	0	—		10	4
Tokyo Verdy	2013	J2 League	21	2	2	0	0	0	—		23	2
Tokyo Verdy	Total		29	6	4	0	0	0	—		33	6
Kataller Toyama (loan)	2014	J2 League	28	2	2	0	0	0	—		30	2
FC Tokyo	2014	J1 League	5	0	0	0	0	0	—		5	0
FC Tokyo	2015	J1 League	13	1	2	0	2	1	—		17	2
FC Tokyo	2016	J1 League	12	3	2	1	4	2	—		18	6
FC Tokyo	2017	J1 League	21	2	1	1	7	3	—		29	6
FC Tokyo	Total		51	6	5	2	13	6	—		69	14
Portimonense (loan)	2017–18	Primeira Liga	29	10	2	0	2	0	—		33	10
Portimonense	2018–19	Primeira Liga	13	5	0	0	1	0	—		14	5
Portimonense	Total		42	15	2	0	3	0	—		47	15
Al-Duhail	2018–19	Qatar Stars League	7	1	3	0	0	0	6 (Note: Appearances in AFC Champions League)	1	16	2
Porto	2019–20	Primeira Liga	16	0	4	1	3	0	5 (Note: One appearance in UEFA Champions League, four appearances in UEFA Europa League)	0	28	1
Porto	2020–21	Primeira Liga	4	0	1	0	0	0	4 (Note: Appearances in UEFA Champions League)	0	9	0
Porto	Total		20	0	5	1	3	0	9	0	37	1
Al Ain (loan)	2020–21	UAE Pro League	2	0	—		—		0	0	2	0
Portimonense (loan)	2021–22	Primeira Liga	22	1	3	1	0	0	—		25	2
Antalyaspor	2022–23	Süper Lig	15	0	1	0	—		—		16	0
Urawa Red Diamonds	2023	J1 League	3	0	0	0	0	0	1	0	4	0
Career total			219	31	25	4	19	6	16	1	279	42

=== International ===
Appearances and goals by national team and year
National team	Year	Apps	Goals
Japan	2018	6	2
Japan	2019	13	3
Total		19	5

Scores and results list Japan's goal tally first, score column indicates score after each Nakajima goal.

List of international goals scored by Shoya Nakajima
No.	Date	Venue	Opponent	Score	Result	Competition
1	23 March 2018	Stade Maurice Dufrasne, Liège, Belgium	Mali	1–1	1–1	Friendly
2	20 November 2018	Toyota Stadium, Toyota, Japan	Kyrgyzstan	4–0	4–0	2018 Kirin Challenge Cup
3	26 March 2019	Noevir Stadium Kobe, Kobe, Japan	Bolivia	1–0	1–0	2019 Kirin Challenge Cup
4	24 June 2019	Estádio Mineirão, Belo Horizonte, Brazil	Ecuador	1–0	1–1	2019 Copa América
5	10 September 2019	Thuwunna Stadium, Yangon, Myanmar	Myanmar	1–0	2–0	2022 FIFA World Cup qualification

== Honours ==
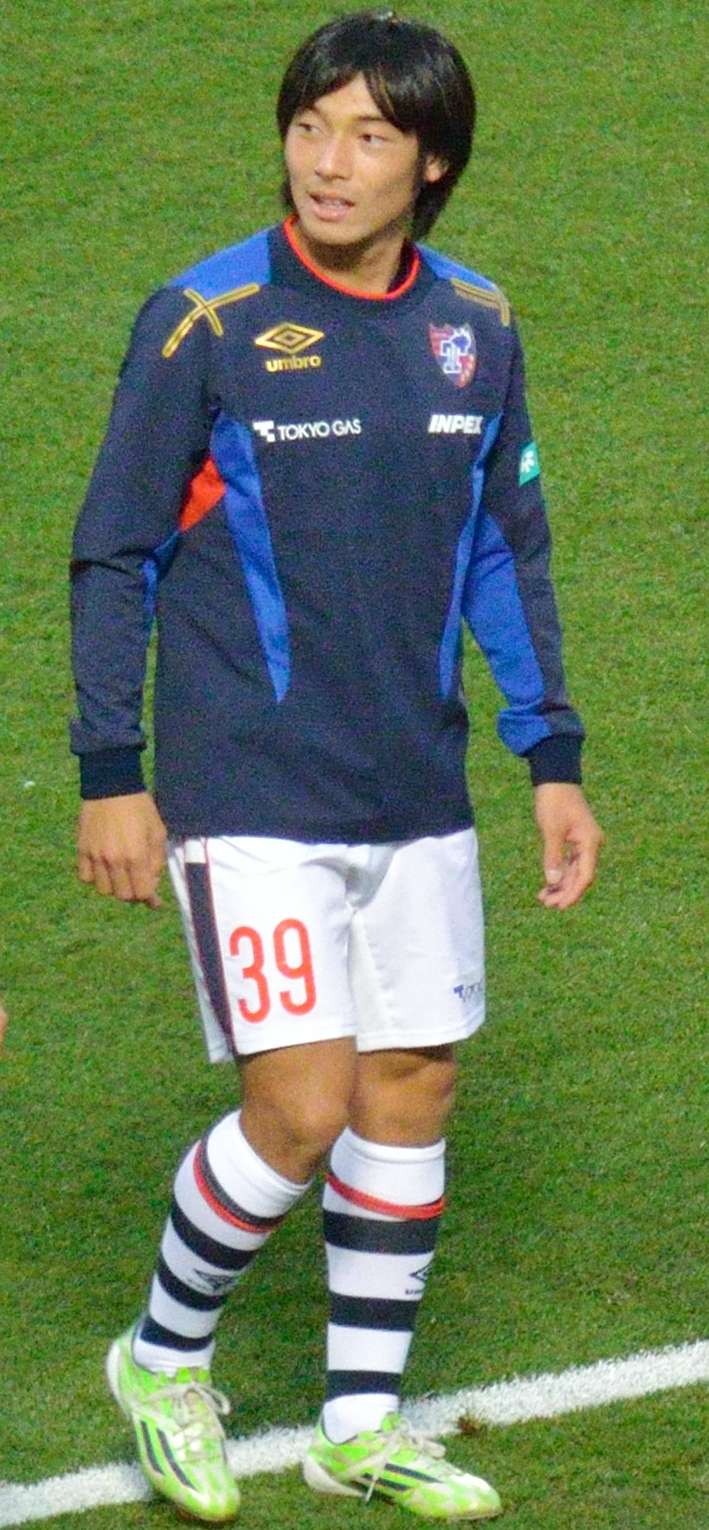
Nakajima with FC Tokyo in 2015

Al-Duhail

- Qatar Emir Cup: 2019

Porto

- Primeira Liga: 2019–20
- Taça de Portugal: 2019–20

Japan U23

- AFC U-23 Championship: 2016

Individual

- AFC U-23 Championship Most Valuable Player: 2016
- Primeira Liga Forward of the Month: October/November 2017
- Primeira Liga Player of the Month: September 2018
- SPJF Goal of the Month: November 2017 vs Tondela
- SPJF Goal of the Month: February 2018 vs Feirense
