= Hideto Takahashi =

Japanese footballer (born 1987)

Hideto Takahashi 高橋秀人
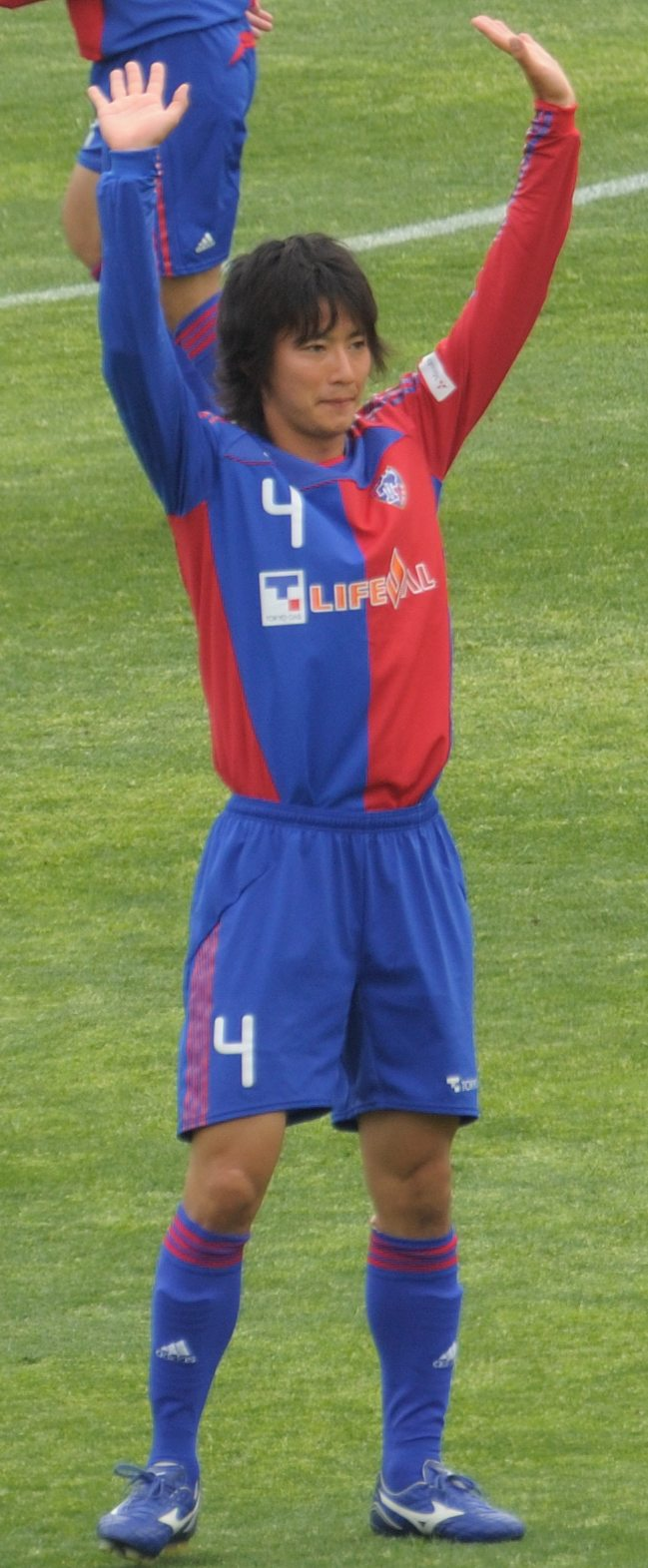

Personal information
- Full name: Hideto Takahashi
- Date of birth: 17 October 1987 (age 39)
- Place of birth: Isesaki, Gunma, Japan
- Height: 1.82 m (6 ft 0 in)
- Positions: Midfielder; defender

Team information
- Current team: Auckland United (youth coach)

Youth career
- 2003–2005: Maebashi Shogyo High School

College career
Years	Team	Apps	(Gls)
2006–2009	Tokyo Gakugei University		

Senior career*
Years	Team	Apps	(Gls)
2010–2016	FC Tokyo	180	(14)
2016	→ FC Tokyo U-23 (loan)	2	(0)
2017	Vissel Kobe	22	(1)
2018–2020	Sagan Tosu	78	(4)
2021–2022	Yokohama FC	36	(0)
2023–2025	Auckland United	81	(10)
Total		399	(29)

International career
2012–2013	Japan	7	(0)

Managerial career
- 2026–: Auckland United (youth coach)
Medal record
FC Tokyo
Winner	Emperor's Cup	2011
- * Club domestic league appearances and goals

Hideto Takahashi (高橋 秀人; born 17 October 1987) is a Japanese football coach and former player who is a youth coach for Auckland United.

== Club career ==
On 28 December 2016, it was announced that Takahashi would leave FC Tokyo after 6 years and join Vissel Kobe.

Takahashi joined Auckland United on 16 February 2023.

== Personal life ==
Takahashi had his first born child on 2 August 2015.

== Club statistics ==
Club	Season	League			Cup^{1}		League Cup^{2}		Continental^{3}		Total	
Club	Season	Division	Apps	Goals	Apps	Goals	Apps	Goals	Apps	Goals	Apps	Goals
FC Tokyo	2010	J. League Division 1	3	0	1	0	3	0	—		7	0
FC Tokyo	2011	J. League Division 2	32	4	6	1	—		—		38	5
FC Tokyo	2012	J. League Division 1	33	1	3	0	5	0	6	1	47	2
FC Tokyo	2013	J. League Division 1	32	2	4	0	4	0	—		40	2
FC Tokyo	2014	J. League Division 1	32	3	3	0	5	0	—		40	3
FC Tokyo	2015	J1 League	29	4	2	0	8	0	—		39	4
FC Tokyo	2016	J1 League	19	0	2	0	4	1	4	0	29	1
FC Tokyo U-23	2016	J3 League	2	0	—		—		—		2	0
FC Tokyo U-23	Total		182	14	21	1	29	1	10	1	242	17
Vissel Kobe	2017	J1 League	22	1	3	0	6	0	—		31	1
Vissel Kobe	Total		22	1	3	0	6	0	0	0	31	1
Sagan Tosu	2018	J1 League	33	3	3	0	2	0	—		38	3
Sagan Tosu	2019	J1 League	32	1	3	0	4	0	—		39	3
Sagan Tosu	2020	J1 League	13	0	0	0	1	0	—		14	0
Sagan Tosu	Total		78	4	6	0	7	0	0	0	91	6
Yokohama FC	2021	J1 League	22	0	1	0	2	0	—		25	0
Yokohama FC	2022	J2 League	14	0	0	0	—		—		14	0
Yokohama FC	Total		36	0	1	0	2	0	0	0	39	0
Auckland United	2023	National League	30	2	0	0	—		—		30	2
Auckland United	2024	National League	22	5	1	0	—		—		23	5
Auckland United	2025	National League	29	3	3	0	—		—		32	3
Auckland United	Total		81	10	4	0	0	0	0	0	85	10
Career total			399	29	35	1	44	1	10	1	488	34

^{1}Includes Emperor's Cup.

^{2}Includes J. League Cup.

^{3}Includes AFC Champions League.

== National team statistics ==
National team	Year	Apps	Goals
Japan	2012	4	0
Japan	2013	3	0
Total		7	0

== Honours ==
=== Club ===
FC Tokyo

- J2 League (1) : 2011
- Emperor's Cup (1) : 2011

=== Japan ===
- EAFF East Asian Cup (1) : 2013
