= Naohiro Ishikawa =

Japanese footballer (born 1981)

Naohiro Ishikawa 石川 直宏
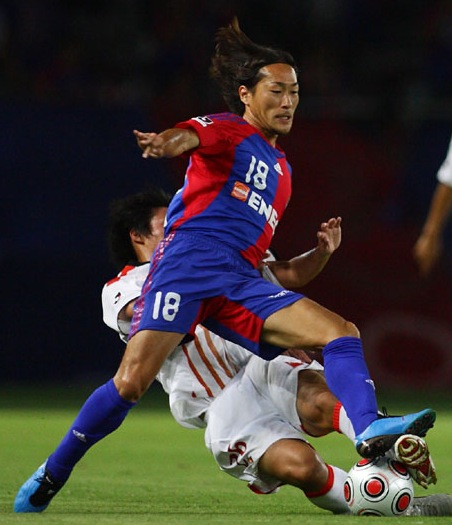

Personal information
- Full name: Naohiro Ishikawa
- Date of birth: 12 May 1981 (age 45)
- Place of birth: Yokosuka, Kanagawa, Japan
- Height: 1.75 m (5 ft 9 in)
- Position: Midfielder

Youth career
- 1997–1999: Yokohama F. Marinos

Senior career*
Years	Team	Apps	(Gls)
2000–2002	Yokohama F. Marinos	15	(1)
2002–2017	FC Tokyo	298	(51)
2016–2017	→FC Tokyo U-23	3	(0)
Total		316	(52)

International career
2001	Japan U-20	3	(0)
2004	Japan U-23	1	(0)
2003–2012	Japan	6	(0)
Medal record
Yokohama F. Marinos
Runner-up	J1 League	2000
Runner-up	J1 League	2002
Winner	J.League Cup	2001
FC Tokyo
Winner	J.League Cup	2004
Winner	J.League Cup	2009
Winner	Emperor's Cup	2011
Representing Japan
Asian Games
Silver medal – second place	2002 Busan	Team
AFC U-19 Championship
Silver medal – second place	2000 Iran
- * Club domestic league appearances and goals

Naohiro Ishikawa (石川 直宏, Ishikawa Naohiro; born 12 May 1981) is a former Japanese footballer who played as a midfielder for the Japan national team.

== Club career ==
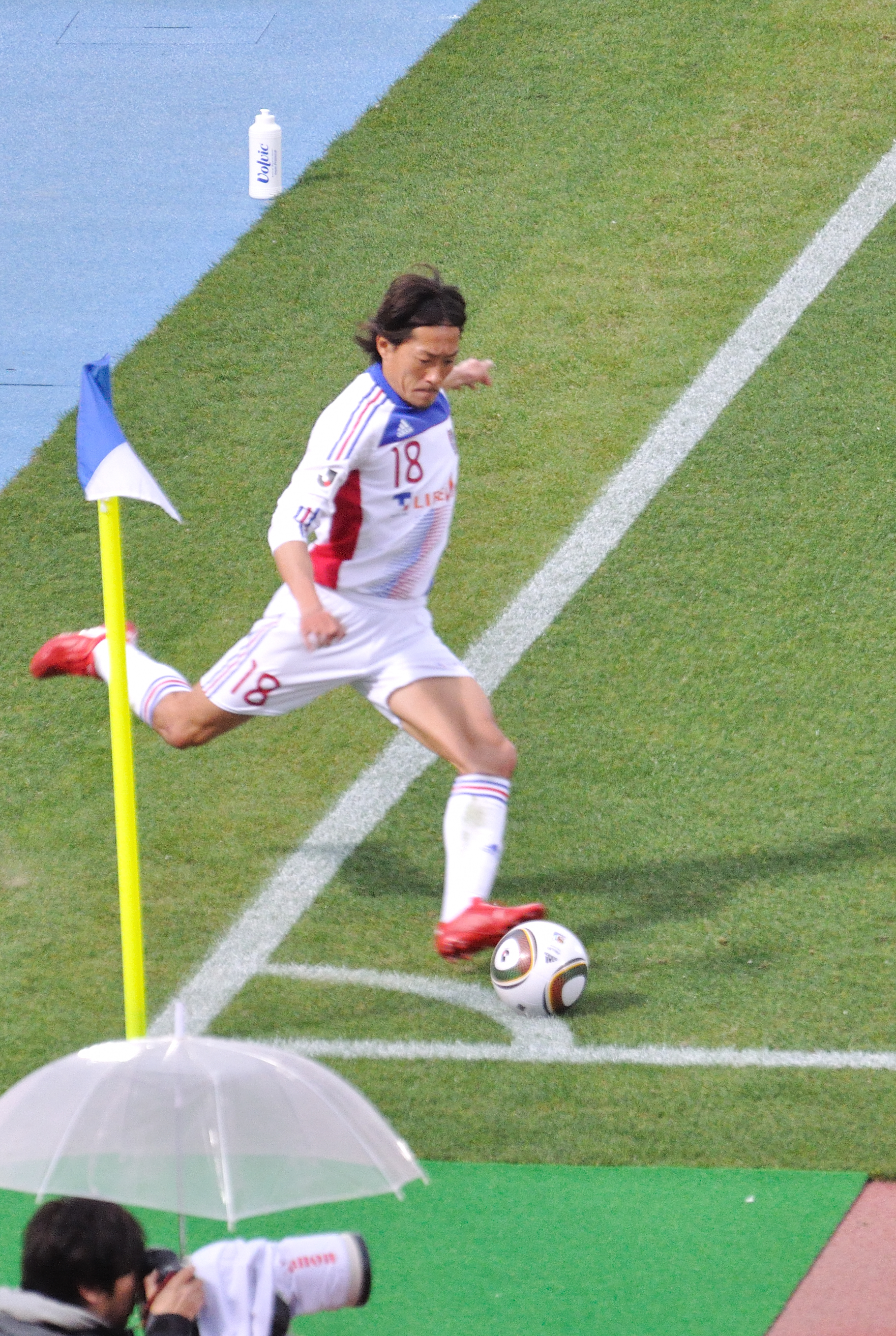
Ishikawa taking a corner

Ishikawa was born in Yokosuka on 12 May 1981. He joined Yokohama F. Marinos from youth team in 2000. Although he was Japan U-20 national team player, he could not play many matches in the club. He moved to FC Tokyo in April 2002. He got many opportunities to play soon. In the 2000s, the club won the champions 2004 and 2009 J.League Cup. In 2009, he also scored 15 goals and was elected Best Eleven. In the 2010s, the club was relegated to J2 League end of 2010 season. In 2011, the club won the champions J2 League and Emperor's Cup. From 2012, the club played in J1 League. However he could not play many matches for injury from 2014. He retired at the end of the 2017 season.

== International career ==
In June 2001, Ishikawa was selected Japan U-20 national team for 2001 World Youth Championship. He wore the number 10 shirt and played full time in all 3 matches.

In December 2003, Ishikawa was selected Japan national team for 2003 East Asian Football Championship. At this tournament, on 7 December, he debuted against Hong Kong. He also played Japan for in 2004. In August, he was also selected Japan U-23 national team for 2004 Summer Olympics.

In August 2009, Ishikawa was selected Japan for the first time in 5 years. He played 6 games for Japan until 2012.

== Club statistics ==
Club performance			League		Cup		League Cup		Continental		Total	
Season	Club	League	Apps	Goals	Apps	Goals	Apps	Goals	Apps	Goals	Apps	Goals
Japan			League		Emperor's Cup		J.League Cup		Asia		Total	
2000	Yokohama F. Marinos	J1 League	2	0	2	0	1	0	-		5	0
2001	Yokohama F. Marinos	J1 League	13	1	0	0	2	0	-		15	1
2002	Yokohama F. Marinos	J1 League	0	0	0	0	0	0	-		0	0
2002	FC Tokyo	J1 League	19	4	1	0	3	0	-		23	4
2003	FC Tokyo	J1 League	29	5	1	0	7	3	-		37	8
2004	FC Tokyo	J1 League	17	0	3	2	4	0	-		24	2
2005	FC Tokyo	J1 League	23	3	0	0	6	1	-		29	4
2006	FC Tokyo	J1 League	20	5	1	0	0	0	-		21	5
2007	FC Tokyo	J1 League	27	4	3	0	7	1	-		37	5
2008	FC Tokyo	J1 League	21	2	3	0	6	1	-		30	3
2009	FC Tokyo	J1 League	24	15	0	0	8	3	-		32	18
2010	FC Tokyo	J1 League	31	2	3	3	5	0	-		39	5
2011	FC Tokyo	J2 League	23	3	6	1	-		-		29	4
2012	FC Tokyo	J1 League	28	5	1	0	4	2	6	0	39	7
2013	FC Tokyo	J1 League	22	2	4	0	3	1	-		29	3
2014	FC Tokyo	J1 League	3	0	1	0	2	0	-		6	0
2015	FC Tokyo	J1 League	10	1	0	0	3	1	-		13	2
2016	FC Tokyo	J1 League	0	0	0	0	0	0	0	0	0	0
2017	FC Tokyo	J1 League	1	0	0	0	0	0	–		1	0
2016	FC Tokyo U-23	J3 League	2	0	-		-		-		2	0
2017	FC Tokyo U-23	J3 League	1	0	-		-		-		1	0
Career total			316	52	29	6	61	13	6	0	412	71

== National team statistics ==
Japan national team
Year	Apps	Goals
2003	1	0
2004	1	0
2005	0	0
2006	0	0
2007	0	0
2008	0	0
2009	2	0
2010	1	0
2011	0	0
2012	1	0
Total	6	0

=== Appearances in major competitions ===
Year	Competition	Category	Appearances		Goals	Team record
Year	Competition	Category	Start	Sub	Goals	Team record
2001	2001 FIFA World Youth Championship	U-20	3	0	0	Round 1
2003	2003 East Asian Football Championship	Senior	0	1	0	2nd place
2003 - 2004	2004 Summer Olympics Qualifiers	U-22 to U-23	3	3	2	Qualified
2004	2004 Summer Olympics	U-23	1	0	0	Round 1

== Honours ==
=== Individual ===
- J.League Best XI : 2009

=== Team ===
- J.League Cup : 2004
- J2 League : 2011
- Emperor's Cup : 2011
