= Michele Canini =

Italian footballer

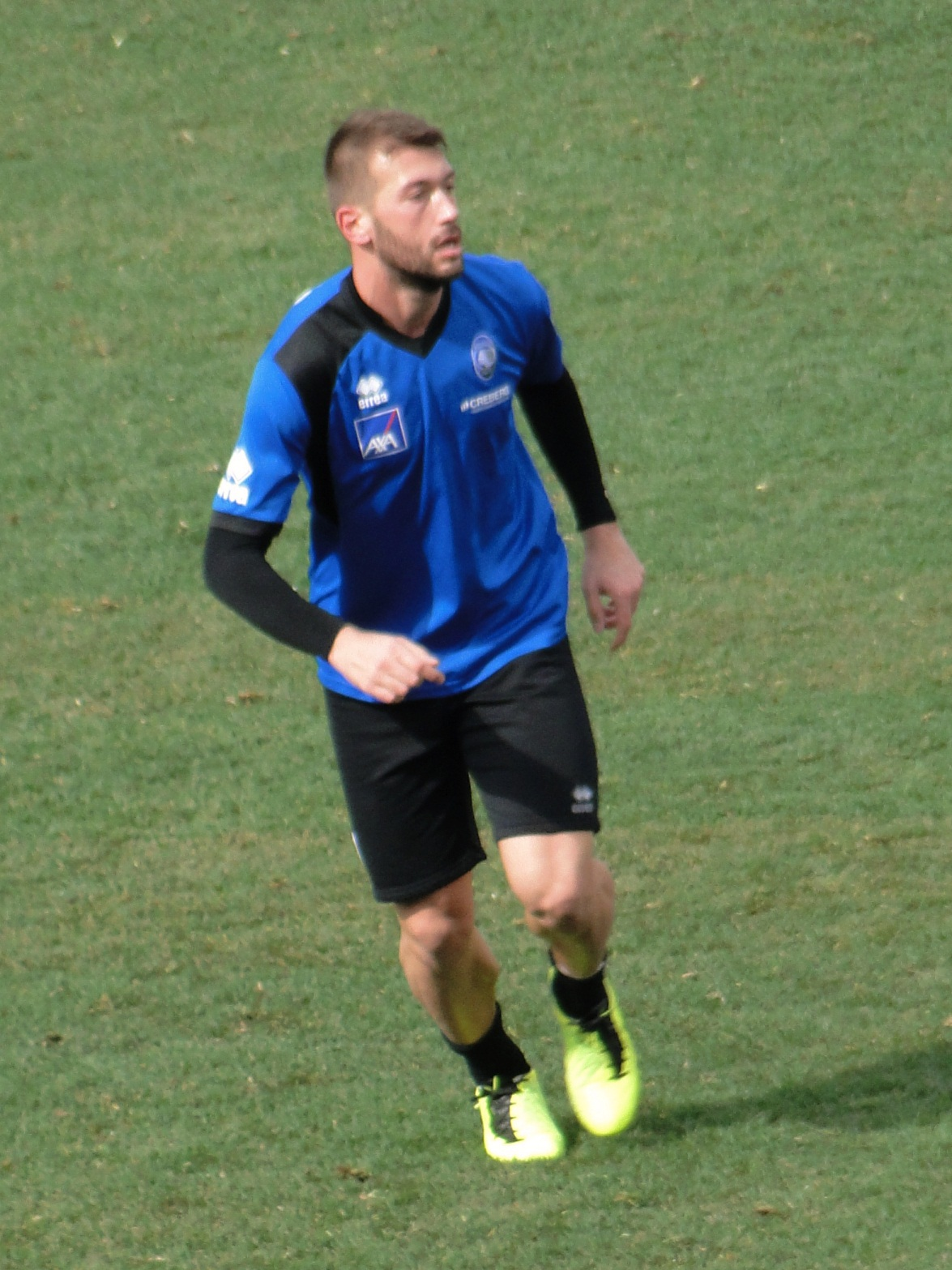

Personal information
- Date of birth: 5 June 1985 (age 41)
- Place of birth: Brescia, Italy
- Height: 1.87 m (6 ft 1 1/2 in)
- Position: Centre back

Youth career
- 1993–2004: Atalanta

Senior career*
Years	Team	Apps	(Gls)
2004–2005	Atalanta	0	(0)
2004–2005	→ Sambenedettese (loan)	31	(0)
2005–2012	Cagliari	176	(2)
2012–2013	Genoa	14	(0)
2013–2018	Atalanta	20	(0)
2014	→ Chievo (loan)	6	(0)
2014–2015	→ FC Tokyo (loan)	10	(0)
2015–2016	→ Ascoli (loan)	25	(2)
2016–2017	→ Parma (loan)	21	(0)
2017–2018	→ Cremonese (loan)	50	(2)
2018–2019	FeralpiSalò	21	(0)
2019	Pergolettese	12	(1)

International career
2003–2004	Italy U19	7	(0)
2004–2007	Italy U20	11	(1)
2005–2007	Italy U21	9	(0)
- * Club domestic league appearances and goals as of 8 December 2019

Michele Canini (born 5 June 1985) is an Italian former footballer who played as a defender.

== Club career ==
=== Cagliari & early career ===
After a loan spell in Serie C1 team Sambenedettese, his first club Atalanta sold him to Cagliari Calcio in co-ownership deal, for €570,000 (with Simone Loria moved to Atalanta for an undisclosed fee). He earned a permanent move to Cagliari in June 2006, for an additional €1.5 million, and spent a seven-year spell playing 176 league matches for the team until the 2011–12 season.

=== Genoa ===
On 12 July 2012, Canini joined Genoa on a four-year deal for €2.9 million.

=== Atalanta return ===
He returned to former club Atalanta on 9 January 2013 for €1 million in a co-ownership deal on a 4 1/2-year contract, as part of Thomas Manfredini's deal for €1.25 million. In June 2013, Canini's co-ownership was renewed.

==== Chievo (loan) ====
On 27 January 2014, he was signed by Chievo in a temporary deal. In June 2014, Atalanta acquired Canini outright from Genoa.

==== FC Tokyo (loan) ====
On 27 July 2014, he was signed by J1 League side FC Tokyo in a temporary deal. Canini left Japan on 24 June 2015.

==== Ascoli (loan) ====
On 18 September 2015, Canini was signed by Ascoli.

==== Parma (loan) ====
On 12 August 2016, Canini was signed by Lega Pro newcomers Parma on another temporary deal.

==== Cremonese (loan) ====
On 31 January 2017, Canini left for Cremonese on a temporary deal for 1 1/2 seasons.

=== FeralpiSalò ===
On 20 July 2018 Canini was signed by FeralpiSalò on a 1-year contract.

=== Pergolettese ===
On 12 August 2019 he joined Pergolettese on a 1-year contract. He was released from his contract with Pergolettese for personal reasons on 12 December 2019.

== International career ==
Canini played for Italy at youth level in the 2005 FIFA World Youth Championship, and in the 2006 and 2007 UEFA European Under-21 Football Championships.
