= Daiki Matsumoto =

Japanese footballer

Personal information
- Full name: Daiki Matsumoto
- Date of birth: May 29, 1991 (age 35)
- Place of birth: Kumamoto, Japan
- Height: 1.84 m (6 ft 1/2 in)
- Position: Forward

Youth career
- 2007–2009: Ohzu High School

College career
Years	Team	Apps	(Gls)
2010–2013	Hosei University		

Senior career*
Years	Team	Apps	(Gls)
2014–2015	Ventforet Kofu	14	(0)
2016	→ V-Varen Nagasaki (loan)		
2017	Tonan Maebashi		
2018	National Defense Ministry	4	(1)
- * Club domestic league appearances and goals as of 23 February 2016

Daiki Matsumoto (松本 大輝, Matsumoto Daiki; born May 29, 1991 in Kumamoto) is a Japanese football player for V-Varen Nagasaki.

== Career statistics ==
Updated to 23 February 2016.

Appearances and goals by club, season and competition
Club	Season	League			Emperor's Cup		J.League Cup		Total	
Club	Season	Division	Apps	Goals	Apps	Goals	Apps	Goals	Apps	Goals
Ventforet Kofu	2014	J1 League	3	0	1	0	3	0	7	0
Ventforet Kofu	2015	J1 League	11	0	2	0	4	1	17	1
Career total			0	0	0	0	0	0	0	0
