= Ryotaro Hironaga =

Japanese footballer

Ryotaro Hironaga 廣永 遼太郎
Personal information
- Full name: Ryotaro Hironaga
- Date of birth: 9 January 1990 (age 36)
- Place of birth: Nishitōkyō, Tokyo, Japan
- Height: 1.86 m (6 ft 1 in)
- Position: Goalkeeper

Youth career
- 2002–2007: FC Tokyo Youth

Senior career*
Years	Team	Apps	(Gls)
2008–2013	FC Tokyo	0	(0)
2008	→ Yokogawa Musashino (loan)	0	(0)
2009–2010	→ Fagiano Okayama (loan)	5	(0)
2014	Kataller Toyama	11	(0)
2015–2021	Sanfrecce Hiroshima	1	(0)
2021–2023	Vissel Kobe	2	(0)

International career
2007	Japan U-17	3	(0)
Medal record
FC Tokyo
Winner	J.League Cup	2009
Winner	Emperor's Cup	2011
Sanfrecce Hiroshima
Winner	J1 League	2015
Runner-up	J1 League	2018
Representing Japan
AFC U-16 Championship
Gold medal – first place	2006 Singapore
- * Club domestic league appearances and goals as of 17 December 2018

Ryotaro Hironaga (廣永 遼太郎, born 9 January 1990) is a Japanese former footballer who played as a goalkeeper.

== National team career ==
In August 2007, Hironaga was elected Japan U-17 national team for 2007 U-17 World Cup. He played full time in all 3 matches.

== Career statistics ==
Appearances and goals by club, season and competition
Club	Season	League			National cup (Note: Includes Emperors Cup)		League cup (Note: Includes J.League Cup)		Total	
Club	Season	Division	Apps	Goals	Apps	Goals	Apps	Goals	Apps	Goals
FC Tokyo	2009	J.League Division 1	0	0	0	0	0	0	0	0
FC Tokyo	2011	J.League Division 2	0	0	0	0	0	0	0	0
FC Tokyo	2012	J.League Division 1	0	0	0	0	0	0	0	0
FC Tokyo	2013	J.League Division 1	0	0	0	0	0	0	0	0
FC Tokyo	2014	J.League Division 1	0	0	0	0	0	0	0	0
FC Tokyo	Total		0	0	0	0	0	0	0	0
Yokogawa Musashino FC (loan)	2008	JFL	0	0	–		–		0	0
Fagiano Okayama (loan)	2009	J.League Division 2	0	0	0	0	–		0	0
Fagiano Okayama (loan)	2010	J.League Division 2	5	0	0	0	–		5	0
Fagiano Okayama (loan)	Total		5	0	0	0	0	0	5	0
Kataller Toyama	2014	J.League Division 2	11	0	–		–		11	0
Sanfrecce Hiroshima	2015	J1 League	0	0	0	0	0	0	0	0
Sanfrecce Hiroshima	2016	J1 League	0	0	0	0	0	0	0	0
Sanfrecce Hiroshima	2017	J1 League	1	0	1	0	4	0	6	0
Sanfrecce Hiroshima	2018	J1 League	0	0	0	0	0	0	0	0
Sanfrecce Hiroshima	2019	J1 League	0	0	1	0	0	0	1	0
Sanfrecce Hiroshima	2020	J1 League	0	0	0	0	0	0	0	0
Sanfrecce Hiroshima	Total		1	0	2	0	4	0	7	0
Vissel Kobe	2021	J1 League	2	0	0	0	1	0	3	0
Vissel Kobe	2022	J1 League	0	0	0	0	0	0	0	0
Vissel Kobe	2023	J1 League	0	0	0	0	0	0	0	0
Vissel Kobe	Total		2	0	0	0	1	0	3	0
Career total			19	0	2	0	5	0	26	0
