= Yūhei Tokunaga =

Japanese footballer

Yuhei Tokunaga 徳永 悠平
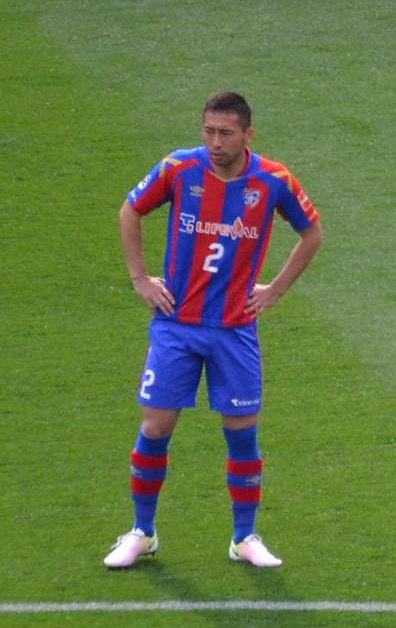

Personal information
- Full name: Yuhei Tokunaga
- Date of birth: 25 September 1983 (age 43)
- Place of birth: Unzen, Nagasaki, Japan
- Height: 1.80 m (5 ft 11 in)
- Position: Defender

Youth career
- 1999–2001: Kunimi High School

College career
Years	Team	Apps	(Gls)
2002–2005	Waseda University		

Senior career*
Years	Team	Apps	(Gls)
2003–2004	FC Tokyo	14	(0)
2006–2017	FC Tokyo	382	(7)
2018–2020	V-Varen Nagasaki	68	(2)
Total		464	(9)

International career
2003	Japan U-20	5	(0)
2004	Japan U-23	2	(0)
2012	Japan Olympic (O.P.)	5	(0)
2009–2013	Japan	9	(0)
Medal record
FC Tokyo
Winner	J.League Cup	2004
Winner	J.League Cup	2009
Winner	Emperor's Cup	2011
Representing Japan
AFC U-19 Championship
Silver medal – second place	2002 Qatar
- * Club domestic league appearances and goals

Yuhei Tokunaga (徳永 悠平, Tokunaga Yūhei; born 25 September 1983) is a Japanese former footballer who played as a defender, most notably for FC Tokyo.

== Playing career ==
Tokunaga was born in Unzen on 25 September 1983. When he was a Waseda University student, he played for J1 League club FC Tokyo in 2003 and 2004. FC Tokyo won the champions in 2004 J.League Cup first major title in the club history. After graduating from Waseda University, he joined FC Tokyo in 2006. He became a regular player as right side back as Akira Kaji successor soon and played many matches every season for a long time. Although his original position is right side back, he also played as many defensive position. FC Tokyo won the champions in 2009 J.League Cup. In 2010, he played many matches as defensive midfielder instead Takuji Yonemoto, who was injured. However FC Tokyo finished at the 16th place of 18 clubs in 2010 season and was relegated to J2 League. In 2011, he returned to right side back and FC Tokyo won the champions and was returned to J1 in a year. FC Tokyo also won the champions in 2011 Emperor's Cup. He played as regular right side back until 2017. In 2018, he moved to his local club V-Varen Nagasaki which newly was promoted to J1 from 2018. He played many matches as right back of three backs defense. However V-Varen finished at the bottom place in 2018 season and was relegated to J2 in a year.

== National team career ==
In November 2003, Tokunaga was selected Japan U-20 national team for 2003 World Youth Championship. At this tournament, he played full-time in all 5 matches as right side midfielder.

Tokunaga was part of the Japan U-23 national team for 2004 Summer Olympics, who exited in the first round, having finished fourth in group B, below group winners Paraguay, Italy and Ghana. He played 2 matches as right side midfielder and right side back.

On October 8, 2009, Tokunaga debuted for Japan national team against Hong Kong at 2011 Asian Cup qualification under manager Takeshi Okada. He played many matches as right side back while battling with Atsuto Uchida for the position until early 2010. However he was not select for 2010 World Cup.

In July 2012, Tokunaga was selected Japan U-23 national team as over aged for 2012 Summer Olympics. He played 5 matches as left side back and Japan reached the semi-finals where they lost to eventual gold medalists, Mexico, and then lost the bronze medal play-off match to South Korea.

In July 2013, Tokunaga was selected Japan under manager Alberto Zaccheroni for 2013 East Asian Cup for the first time in 3 years. At the tournament, he played 2 matches as left side back and Japan won the champions. This tournament is his last game for Japan. He played 9 games for Japan until 2013.

== Club statistics ==
Appearances and goals by club, season and competition
Club	Season	League			National cup (Note: Includes Emperor's Cup)		League cup (Note: Includes J.League Cup)		Continental		Other		Total	
Club	Season	Division	Apps	Goals	Apps	Goals	Apps	Goals	Apps	Goals	Apps	Goals	Apps	Goals
FC Tokyo	2003	J.League Division 1	8	0	0	0	2	0	0	0	0	0	10	0
FC Tokyo	2004	J.League Division 1	6	0	0	0	4	0	0	0	0	0	10	0
FC Tokyo	2006	J.League Division 1	32	1	2	0	5	0	0	0	0	0	39	1
FC Tokyo	2007	J.League Division 1	33	0	3	0	7	0	0	0	0	0	43	0
FC Tokyo	2008	J.League Division 1	30	1	4	0	8	0	0	0	0	0	42	1
FC Tokyo	2009	J.League Division 1	34	0	0	0	10	0	0	0	0	0	44	0
FC Tokyo	2010	J.League Division 1	30	0	5	0	7	0	0	0	0	0	42	0
FC Tokyo	2011	J.League Division 2	37	3	6	0	0	0	0	0	0	0	43	3
FC Tokyo	2012	J.League Division 1	31	1	0	0	2	0	7 (Note: Appearances in AFC Champions League)	1	1 (Note: Appearance in Japanese Super Cup)	0	41	2
FC Tokyo	2013	J.League Division 1	34	1	5	0	5	0	0	0	0	0	44	1
FC Tokyo	2014	J.League Division 1	34	0	3	0	3	1	0	0	0	0	40	1
FC Tokyo	2015	J1 League	33	0	2	0	7	0	0	0	0	0	42	0
FC Tokyo	2016	J1 League	30	0	1	0	2	0	8	0	0	0	41	0
FC Tokyo	2017	J1 League	24	0	1	0	7	0	0	0	0	0	32	0
FC Tokyo	Total		396	7	32	0	69	1	15	1	1	0	513	9
V-Varen Nagasaki	2018	J1 League	27	0	2	0	0	0	–		–		29	0
V-Varen Nagasaki	2019	J2 League	31	1	1	0	2	0	–		–		34	1
V-Varen Nagasaki	2020	J2 League	10	1	0	0	0	0	–		–		10	1
V-Varen Nagasaki	Total		68	2	3	0	2	0	0	0	0	0	73	2
Career total			464	9	35	0	71	1	15	1	1	0	586	11

== National team statistics ==
Japan national team
Year	Apps	Goals
2009	5	0
2010	2	0
2011	0	0
2012	0	0
2013	2	0
Total	9	0

== Honours ==
=== Japan ===
- EAFF East Asian Cup (1) : 2013

=== Club ===
FC Tokyo

- J2 League (1) : 2011
- Emperor's Cup (1) : 2011
- J.League Cup (2) : 2004, 2009
