= Hirotaka Mita =

Japanese footballer (born 1990)

Hirotaka Mita 三田 啓貴
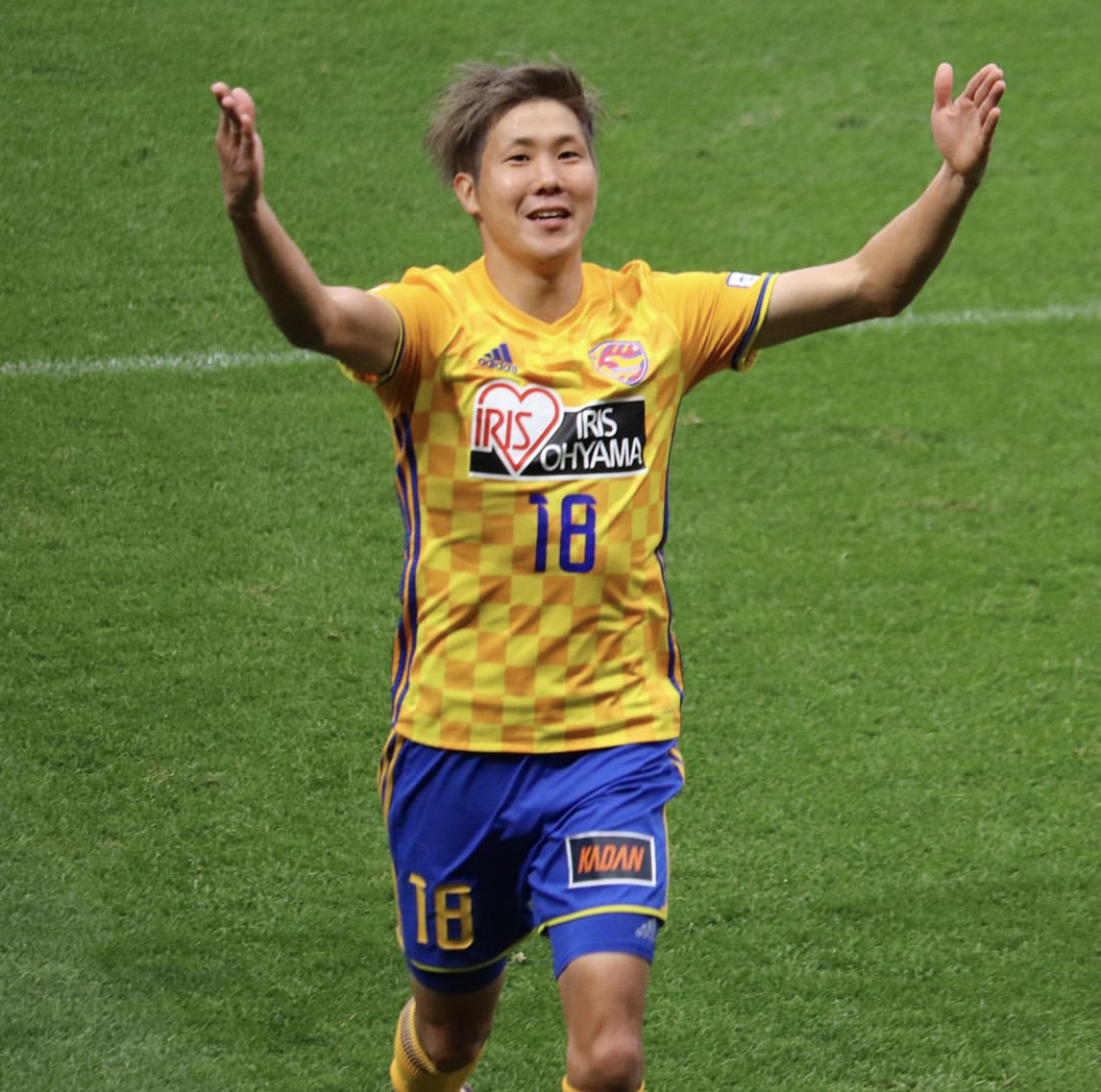

Personal information
- Full name: Hirotaka Mita
- Date of birth: 14 September 1990 (age 36)
- Place of birth: Setagaya, Japan
- Height: 1.73 m (5 ft 8 in)
- Position: Attacking midfielder

Team information
- Current team: Ayutthaya United

Youth career
- 2000–2002: Buddy FC
- 2003–2008: FC Tokyo

College career
Years	Team	Apps	(Gls)
2009–2012	Meiji University		

Senior career*
Years	Team	Apps	(Gls)
2012–2016	FC Tokyo	60	(5)
2016	→ Vegalta Sendai (loan)	31	(3)
2017	Vegalta Sendai	33	(5)
2018–2019	Vissel Kobe	47	(7)
2019–2022	FC Tokyo	88	(3)
2023–2024	Yokohama FC	43	(2)
2025	Oliveirense	6	(0)
2025–2026	Nakhon Ratchasima	29	(3)
2026–	Ayutthaya United	0	(0)
- * Club domestic league appearances and goals as of 1 May 2026, 16:27 (UTC+7)

Hirotaka Mita (三田 啓貴, Mita Hirotaka, born September 14, 1990) is a Japanese professional footballer who plays as an attacking midfielder and currently plays for Thai League 1 club, Ayutthaya United. Known for his versatility and work rate, Mita has played over 300 matches in Japan's top tiers and has recently ventured into international leagues, showcasing his adaptability at age 35.

== Early life ==
Born in Setagaya, Tokyo, Mita grew up in a vibrant urban environment that fostered his early interest in football. He began his youth career with Buddy FC from 2000 to 2002 before joining the prestigious FC Tokyo youth academy from 2003 to 2008. Mita opted for higher education at Meiji University, a renowned institution for developing football talent in Japan, where he played university football from 2009 to 2012. During his time at Meiji, he made 4 appearances and scored 2 goals in the Emperor's Cup as a special designated player for the JFA and J.League in 2012, demonstrating his early potential. His decision to pursue university football before turning professional reflects a thoughtful approach to his career, prioritizing development over an immediate leap to professional football.

== Playing style ==
Capable of playing as a central midfielder or right midfielder, he excels in linking play between defense and attack, often serving as a creative hub with precise left-footed passes and through balls. His work rate allows him to contribute defensively by pressing opponents and tracking back, making him a well-rounded midfielder. While not a prolific goal-scorer, with 25 goals in 308 league appearances, Mita’s playmaking ability is evident in his capacity to create scoring opportunities and maintain possession. His standout performance, including a hat-trick in a 2018 J.League Cup match.

== Career ==
Mita began his professional career with FC Tokyo in 2012, where he played 60 matches and scored 5 goals over four years. In 2016, he was loaned to Vegalta Sendai, where he made 31 appearances and scored 3 goals, before signing permanently in 2017 for 33 appearances and 5 goals. In 2018, Mita joined Vissel Kobe, where he played alongside global superstar Andrés Iniesta, a World Cup and European Championship winner with Spain, and Lukas Podolski, a German World Cup winner, contributing to Vissel Kobe’s 2019 Japanese Super Cup victory. He made 47 appearances and scored 7 goals during his time at Kobe. Mita returned to FC Tokyo in 2019, achieving a milestone of 200 J1 League appearances in 2020, a testament to his durability and consistency. He played 88 matches and scored 3 goals in his second stint at FC Tokyo, also winning the 2020 J.League Cup. In 2023, he joined Yokohama FC, making 43 appearances and scoring 2 goals over two seasons.

On 6 February 2025, Mita joined Liga Portugal 2 club, Oliveirense, marking his first overseas transfer at the age of 34. He played 6 matches for the club in the 2024–25 season. 2025, Mita transferred to Thai League 1 club, Nakhon Ratchasima, continuing his overseas career in Thailand’s top-tier league.

== Notable teammates ==
During his time at Vissel Kobe in 2018–2019, Mita played alongside high-profile teammates including spanish midfielder Andrés Iniesta and german striker Lukas Podolski. At FC Tokyo, Mita shared the pitch with established Japanese internationals such as Yuto Nagatomo.

While these experiences provided Mita with significant exposure to elite-level talent, he is generally characterized as a reliable and versatile professional rather than a superstar.

== Career statistics ==
=== Club ===
As of 31 May 2025.

Appearances and goals by club, season and competition
Club performance			League		Cup		League Cup		Continental		Total	
Club	Season	League	Apps	Goals	Apps	Goals	Apps	Goals	Apps	Goals	Apps	Goals
Japan			League		Emperor's Cup		J. League Cup		AFC		Total	
FC Tokyo	2012	J.League Div 1	1	0	0	0	1	0	–		2	0
FC Tokyo	2013	J.League Div 1	17	2	4	1	4	1	–		25	4
FC Tokyo	2014	J.League Div 1	24	2	2	0	3	1	–		29	3
FC Tokyo	2015	J1 League	18	1	1	0	6	2	–		25	3
FC Tokyo	Total		60	5	7	1	14	4	–		81	10
Vegalta Sendai (loan)	2016	J1 League	31	3	1	0	5	0	–		37	3
Vegalta Sendai	2017	J1 League	33	5	0	0	9	2	–		42	7
Vissel Kobe	2018	J1 League	32	6	3	3	2	0	–		37	9
Vissel Kobe	2019	J1 League	15	1	1	0	5	0	–		21	1
Vissel Kobe	Total		!47	7	4	3	7	0	–		58	10
FC Tokyo	2019	J1 League	14	1	0	0	2	0	–		16	1
FC Tokyo	2020	J1 League	26	1	0	0	3	0	4	0	33	1
FC Tokyo	2021	J1 League	32	1	1	0	11	1	–		44	2
FC Tokyo	2022	J1 League	16	0	0	0	5	1	–		21	1
FC Tokyo	Total		88	3	1	0	21	2	4	0	114	5
Yokohama FC	2023	J1 League	31	0	2	0	3	0	–		0	0
Yokohama FC	2024	J2 League	12	2	1	1	2	0	–		0	0
Yokohama FC	Total		43	2	3	1	5	0	–		51	3
Oliveirense	2025	Liga Portugal 2	6	0	0	0	–				6	0
Nakhon Ratchasima	2025	Thai League 1	2	1	0	0	–				2	1
Career total			308	25	16	5	61	8	4	0	389	38

== Honours ==
=== Club ===
Vissel Kobe

- Japanese Super Cup: 2019

FC Tokyo

- J.League Cup: 2020
