= Yohei Hayashi =

Japanese footballer

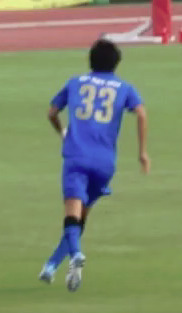

Personal information
- Full name: Yohei Hayashi
- Date of birth: July 16, 1989 (age 37)
- Place of birth: Sayama, Saitama, Japan
- Height: 1.77 m (5 ft 9 1/2 in)
- Position: Forward

Team information
- Current team: Briobecca Urayasu
- Number: 24

Youth career
- 2008–2011: Chuo University FC

Senior career*
Years	Team	Apps	(Gls)
2012–2016	FC Tokyo	15	(0)
2014	→ Fagiano Okayama (loan)	15	(1)
2014	→ Oita Trinita (loan)	20	(7)
2016	→ FC Tokyo U-23 (loan)	20	(7)
2017–2018	Oita Trinita	26	(3)
2019–2020	Blaublitz Akita	50	(8)
2021	Briobecca Urayasu	0	(0)

International career
2008	Japan U-19		
2010	Japan U-21		
- * Club domestic league appearances and goals as of 19 December 2020

Yohei Hayashi (林 容平, Hayashi Yōhei; born July 16, 1989) is a Japanese football player for Blaublitz Akita.

== Club statistics ==
Updated to 31 December 2020.

Club performance			League		Cup		League Cup		Continental		Total	
Season	Club	League	Apps	Goals	Apps	Goals	Apps	Goals	Apps	Goals	Apps	Goals
Japan			League		Emperor's Cup		J. League Cup		Asia		Total	
2012	FC Tokyo	J1 League	1	0	0	0	0	0	2	0	3	0
2013	FC Tokyo	J1 League	3	0	2	1	1	0	-		6	1
2014	Fagiano Okayama	J2 League	15	1	1	1	-		-		16	2
2014	Oita Trinita	J2 League	20	7	-		-		-		20	7
2015	FC Tokyo	J1 League	11	0	1	0	5	2	-		17	2
2016	FC Tokyo	J1 League	0	0	1	0	0	0	0	0	1	0
2016	FC Tokyo U-23	J3 League	20	7	–		–		–		20	7
2017	Oita Trinita	J2 League	14	1	0	0	–		–		20	7
2018	Oita Trinita	J2 League	12	2	1	0	–				13	2
2019	Blaublitz Akita	J3 League	21	5	1	0	–		–		22	5
2020	Blaublitz Akita	J3 League	29	3	0	0	–		–		29	3
Total			115	19	5	2	6	2	2	0	121	23

== Honours ==
Blaublitz Akita

- J3 League (1): 2020

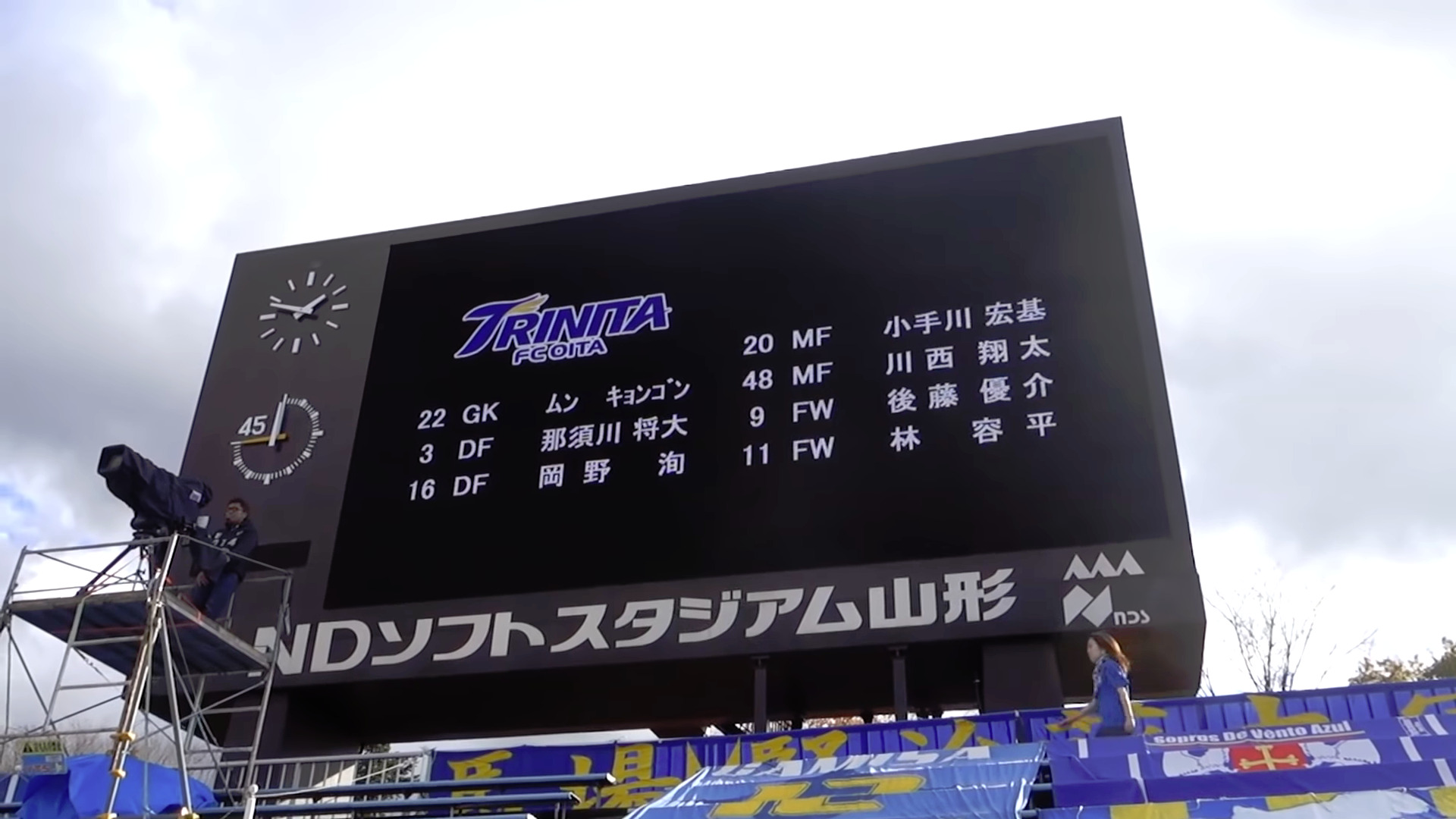
ND Stadium Yamagata scoreboard

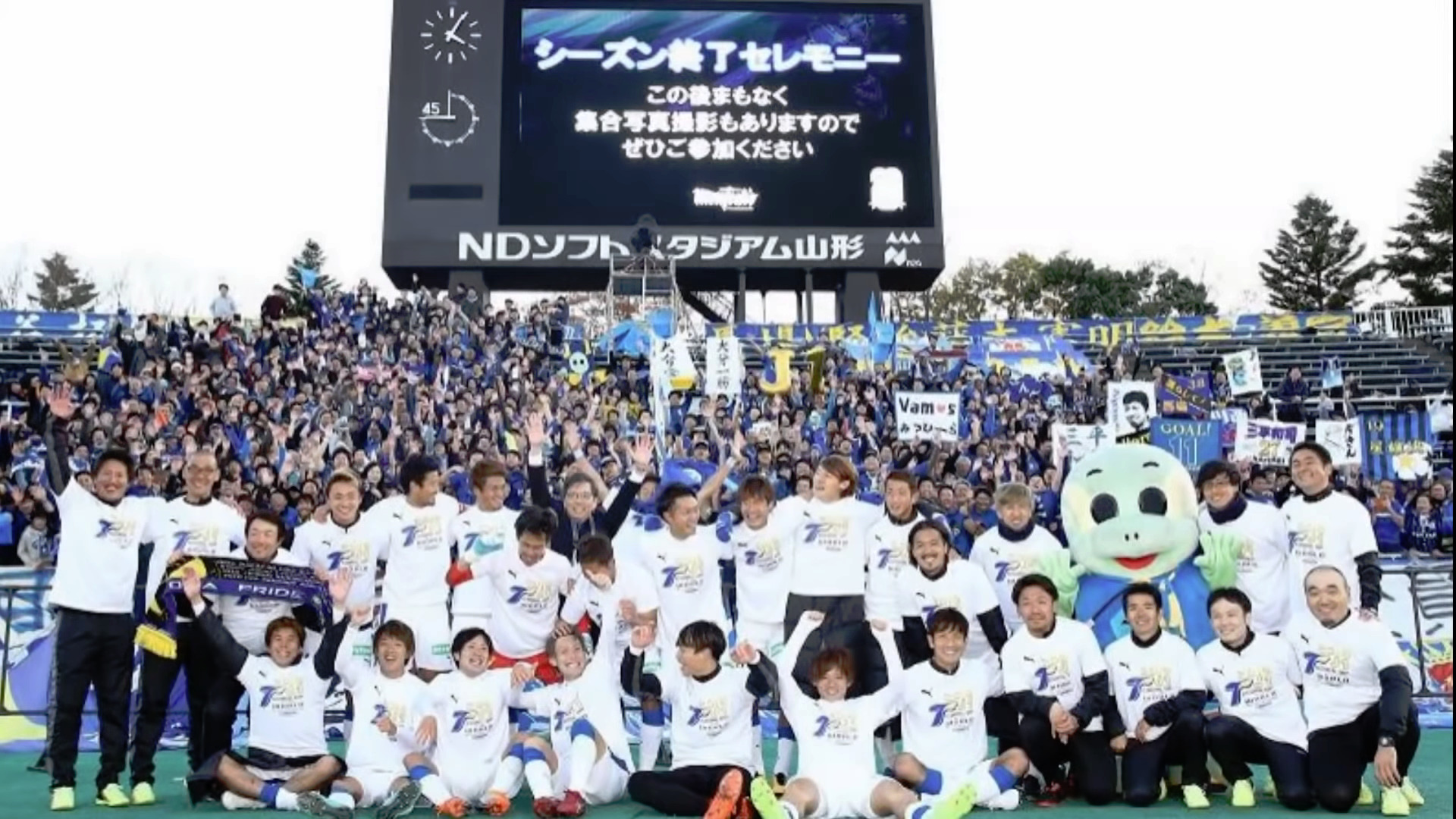
Oita got promoted to J1
