= Kazunori Yoshimoto =

Japanese footballer

Kazunori Yoshimoto 吉本 一謙
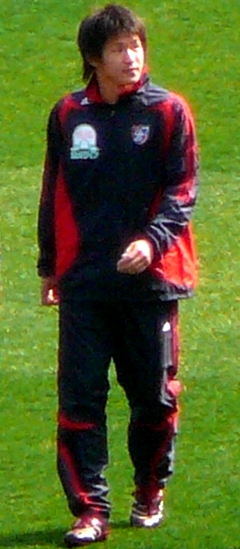

Personal information
- Full name: Kazunori Yoshimoto
- Date of birth: April 24, 1988 (age 38)
- Place of birth: Kodaira, Tokyo, Japan
- Height: 1.85 m (6 ft 1 in)
- Position: Centre back

Youth career
- 2002–2006: FC Tokyo Youth

Senior career*
Years	Team	Apps	(Gls)
2007–	FC Tokyo	65	(2)
2009–2010	→ FC Gifu (loan)	44	(2)
2012	→ Mito HollyHock (loan)	2	(1)
2016	→ FC Tokyo U-23 (loan)	17	(0)
2018–2019	→ Avispa Fukuoka (loan)	18	(1)
2019–2020	Shimizu S-Pulse	7	(0)

International career
2004	Japan U-17	3	(0)
Medal record
FC Tokyo
Winner	J.League Cup	2009
Winner	Emperor's Cup	2011
- * Club domestic league appearances and goals as of 21:35, 4 January 2021 (UTC)

Kazunori Yoshimoto (吉本 一謙, Yoshimoto Kazunori; born April 24, 1988) is a Japanese retired footballer.

== Club career ==
=== Avispa Fukuoka ===
In June 2018, FC Tokyo loaned Yoshimoto to Avispa Fukuoka.

=== Shimizu S-Pulse ===
In July 2019, Yoshimoto signed with Shimizu S-Pulse. He retired in December 2020.

== Club statistics ==
Updated to end of 2018 season.

Club performance			League		Cup		League Cup		Continental		Total	
Season	Club	League	Apps	Goals	Apps	Goals	Apps	Goals	Apps	Goals	Apps	Goals
Japan			League		Emperor's Cup		J. League Cup		AFC		Total	
2007	FC Tokyo	J1 League	1	0	0	0	1	0	-		2	0
2008	FC Tokyo	J1 League	2	1	0	0	2	0	-		4	1
2009	FC Tokyo	J1 League	0	0	0	0	0	0	-		0	0
2009	FC Gifu	J2 League	11	2	4	2	-		-		15	4
2010	FC Gifu	J2 League	33	0	1	1	-		-		34	1
2011	FC Tokyo	J2 League	0	0	0	0	-		-		0	0
2012	FC Tokyo	J1 League	0	0	0	0	0	0	-		0	0
2012	Mito HollyHock	J2 League	2	1	0	0	-		-		2	1
2013	FC Tokyo	J1 League	0	0	0	0	0	0	-		0	0
2014	FC Tokyo	J1 League	25	0	3	0	5	0	-		33	0
2015	FC Tokyo	J1 League	19	0	1	0	3	0	-		23	0
2016	FC Tokyo	J1 League	7	0	1	0	4	0	3	0	14	0
2017	FC Tokyo	J1 League	11	1	1	0	7	1	-		19	2
2018	FC Tokyo	J1 League	0	0	0	0	5	0	-		5	0
2018	Avispa Fukuoka	J2 League	11	1	0	0	-		-		11	1
Total			122	6	11	3	27	1	3	0	163	10

== Reserves performance ==
Last Updated: 3 March 2019

Club performance			League		Total	
Season	Club	League	Apps	Goals	Apps	Goals
Japan			League		Total	
2016	FC Tokyo U-23	J3	10	0	10	0
2017	FC Tokyo U-23	J3	4	0	4	0
2018	FC Tokyo U-23	J3	3	0	3	0
Career total			17	0	17	0

== National team career statistics ==
=== Appearances in major competitions ===
Team	Competition	Category	Appearances		Goals	Team record
Team	Competition	Category	Start	Sub	Goals	Team record
Japan	AFC U-17 Championship 2004	U-16	3	0	0	Group Stage
