= Hiroki Kawano =

Japanese footballer

Hiroki Kawano 河野 広貴
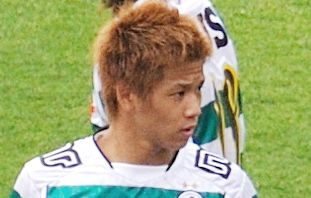

Personal information
- Full name: Hiroki Kawano
- Date of birth: 30 March 1990 (age 36)
- Place of birth: Sagamihara, Kanagawa, Japan
- Height: 1.68 m (5 ft 6 in)
- Positions: Second striker; winger

Youth career
- 2005–2007: Tokyo Verdy 1969 Youth

Senior career*
Years	Team	Apps	(Gls)
2007–2011	Tokyo Verdy	114	(19)
2012–2017	FC Tokyo	102	(13)
2017–2018	Sagan Tosu	9	(0)
2019	→ Tokyo Verdy (loan)	15	(2)
2020	Tokyo Verdy	4	(0)
2021–2022	Nankatsu SC	5	(0)

International career
2006–2007	Japan U-17	7	(3)
2008	Japan U-19	3	(0)
Medal record
Representing Japan
AFC U-16 Championship
Gold medal – first place	2006 Singapore
- * Club domestic league appearances and goals as of 20:01, 16 January 2021 (UTC)

Hiroki Kawano (河野 広貴, Kawano Hiroki; born 30 March 1990 in Sagamihara, Kanagawa) is a Japanese former football player who played as a forward or winger. He made over 300 appearances over a 16-year career, playing for Tokyo Verdy, FC Tokyo, Sagan Tosu and finishing his career at Nankatsu SC.

== National team career ==
In August 2007, Kawano was elected Japan U-17 national team for 2007 U-17 World Cup. He played all 3 matches and scored a goal against Haiti.

== Club statistics ==
Appearances and goals by club, season and competition
Club	Season	League			National Cup		League Cup		Continental		Other		Total	
Club	Season	Division	Apps	Goals	Apps	Goals	Apps	Goals	Apps	Goals	Apps	Goals	Apps	Goals
Japan			League		Emperor's Cup		J. League Cup		AFC		Other		Total	
Tokyo Verdy	2007	J.League Division 2	1	0	0	0	–		–		–		1	0
Tokyo Verdy	2008	J.League Division 1	17	2	0	0	5	0	–		–		22	2
Tokyo Verdy	2009	J.League Division 2	35	6	1	0	–		–		–		36	6
Tokyo Verdy	2010	J.League Division 2	29	3	1	0	–		–		–		30	3
Tokyo Verdy	2011	J.League Division 2	32	8	0	0	–		–		–		32	8
Tokyo Verdy	Total		114	19	2	0	5	0	0	0	0	0	121	19
FC Tokyo	2012	J.League Division 1	9	1	0	0	0	0	3	0	1 (Note: Appearance in the Japanese Super Cup)	0	13	1
FC Tokyo	2013	J.League Division 1	4	0	1	0	5	0	–		–		10	0
FC Tokyo	2014	J.League Division 1	30	6	3	3	6	1	–		–		39	9
FC Tokyo	2015	J1 League	22	1	2	0	5	1	–		–		29	2
FC Tokyo	2016	J1 League	29	5	1	0	4	0	5	2	–		39	7
FC Tokyo	2017	J1 League	8	0	1	0	1	0	–		–		10	0
FC Tokyo	Total		102	13	8	3	21	2	8	2	1	0	140	19
Sagan Tosu	2017	J1 League	7	0	0	0	0	0	–		–		7	0
Sagan Tosu	2018	J1 League	2	0	3	1	6	0	–		–		11	1
Sagan Tosu	Total		9	0	3	1	6	0	0	0	0	0	18	1
Tokyo Verdy (loan)	2019	J2 League	15	2	1	0	–		–		–		16	2
Tokyo Verdy	2020	J2 League	4	0	0	0	–		–		–		4	0
Nankatsu SC	2021	KSL 2nd Div.	5	0	0	0	–		–		–		5	0
Nankatsu SC	2022	KSL 1st Div.	0	0	0	0	–		–		–		0	0
Nankatsu SC	Total		5	0	0	0	0	0	0	0	0	0	5	0
Career total			249	34	14	4	32	2	8	2	1	0	304	41

== National team career statistics ==
=== Appearances in major competitions ===
Team	Competition	Category	Appearances		Goals	Team record
Team	Competition	Category	Start	Sub	Goals	Team record
Japan	AFC U-17 Championship 2006	U-16	0	4	2	Champions
Japan	2007 FIFA U-17 World Cup	U-17	0	3	1	Round 1
Japan	AFC U-19 Championship 2008	U-19	0	3	0	Quarterfinal

== Honours ==
Japan National Team

- AFC U-17 Championship : 2006

Individual

J1 League Goal of the Month (September 2016)
