= Takuji Yonemoto =

Japanese footballer

Takuji Yonemoto 米本 拓司
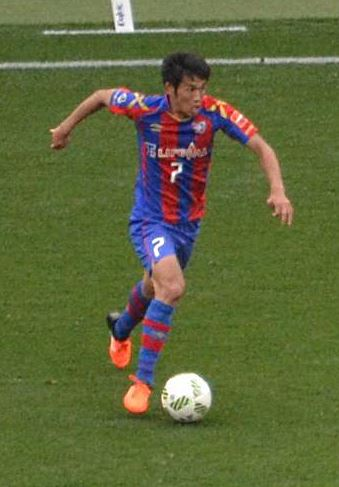
- Yonemoto with FC Tokyo in April 2016

Personal information
- Full name: Takuji Yonemoto
- Date of birth: 3 December 1990 (age 35)
- Place of birth: Itami, Hyōgo, Japan
- Height: 1.77 m (5 ft 9 1/2 in)
- Position: Defensive midfielder

Team information
- Current team: Kyoto Sanga
- Number: 8

Youth career
- 1997–2002: Mizuho SC
- 2003–2005: Itami FC
- 2006–2008: Itami High School

Senior career*
Years	Team	Apps	(Gls)
2009–2018	FC Tokyo	215	(5)
2017	→ FC Tokyo U-23 (loan)	13	(0)
2019–2025	Nagoya Grampus	122	(1)
2022	→ Shonan Bellmare (loan)	27	(0)
2024–2025	→ Kyoto Sanga (loan)	11	(0)
2025–	Kyoto Sanga	25	(2)

International career^{‡}
2007	Japan U-17	2	(0)
2010	Japan	1	(0)
Medal record
FC Tokyo
Winner	J.League Cup	2009
Winner	Emperor's Cup	2011
- * Club domestic league appearances and goals as of 1 August 2026 ‡ National team caps and goals as of 28 July 2015

Takuji Yonemoto (米本 拓司, Yonemoto Takuji; born 3 December 1990) is a Japanese footballer who plays as defensive midfielder for J1 League club Kyoto Sanga.

== National team career ==
In August 2007, Yonemoto was elected Japan U-17 national team for 2007 U-17 World Cup. He played 2 matches.

Yonemoto made his full international debut for Japan on 6 January 2010 in a 2011 AFC Asian Cup qualifier against Yemen.

On 7 May 2015, Japan's coach Vahid Halilhodžić called him for a two-days training camp. On 23 July 2015, he was called again for the upcoming 2015 EAFF East Asian Cup.

== Career statistics ==
=== Club ===
As of match played 5 November 2022.

Club	Season	League			Emperor's Cup		J. League Cup		AFC		Total	
Club	Season	Division	Apps	Goals	Apps	Goals	Apps	Goals	Apps	Goals	Apps	Goals
FC Tokyo	2009	J1 League	28	1	3	0	8	3	-		39	4
FC Tokyo	2010	J1 League	7	0	2	0	0	0	-		9	0
FC Tokyo	2011	J2 League	1	0	0	0	-		-		1	0
FC Tokyo	2012	J1 League	27	0	1	0	4	0	5	0	37	0
FC Tokyo	2013	J1 League	33	1	5	0	4	0	-		42	1
FC Tokyo	2014	J1 League	33	2	3	0	6	0	-		42	2
FC Tokyo	2015	J1 League	31	1	2	0	5	0	-		38	1
FC Tokyo	2016	J1 League	21	0	0	0	0	0	8	1	29	1
FC Tokyo	2017	J1 League	11	0	1	0	7	0	–		19	0
FC Tokyo	2018	J1 League	23	0	2	0	3	0	–		28	0
FC Tokyo	Total		215	5	19	0	37	3	13	1	284	9
Nagoya Grampus	2019	J1 League	28	0	0	0	2	0	–		30	0
Nagoya Grampus	2020	J1 League	27	1	–		2	0	–		29	1
Nagoya Grampus	2021	J1 League	28	0	3	0	2	0	6	0	39	0
Nagoya Grampus	Total		83	1	3	0	6	0	6	0	98	1
Shonan Bellmare (loan)	2022	J1 League	27	0	1	0	6	0	–		34	0
Career Total			325	6	23	0	49	3	19	1	416	10

== Reserves performance ==
Last Updated: 21 February 2019

Club performance			League		Total	
Season	Club	League	Apps	Goals	Apps	Goals
Japan			League		Total	
2017	FC Tokyo U-23	J3	10	0	10	0
2018	FC Tokyo U-23	J3	3	0	3	0
Career total			13	0	13	0

== National team statistics ==
Japan national team
Year	Apps	Goals
2010	1	0
Total	1	0

== Honors ==
FC Tokyo

- J2 League: 2011
- J.League Cup: 2009

Individual

- J.League Cup MVP: 2009
- J. League Cup New Hero Award: 2009
