= 2016 Avispa Fukuoka season =

Avispa Fukuoka
2016 season
- Manager: Masami Ihara
- Stadium: Level-5 Stadium
- J1 League: First stage: 18th Second stage: 16th Overall: 18th
- J.League Cup: Knock-out stage
Home colours	Away colours

The 2016 Avispa Fukuoka season was the club's ninth season in the J1 League, they returned to the Japanese top flight after winning the 2015 J2 League playoffs. Avispa Fukuoka also competed in the J.League Cup and the Emperor's Cup.

== Transfers ==
=== Winter ===
In: Note: Flags indicate national team as defined under FIFA eligibility rules; some limited exceptions apply. Players may hold more than one non-FIFA nationality.

No.	Pos.	Nation	Player
5	DF	JPN	Yuki Saneto (from (Japan) Kawasaki Frontale)
6	MF	COL	Danilson Córdoba (from (Japan) Nagoya Grampus)
13	FW	JPN	Hirotaka Tameda (from (Japan) Oita Trinita)
18	DF	JPN	Masashi Kamekawa (from (Japan) Shonan Bellmare, previously on loan)
20	DF	KOR	Kim Hyun-hun (from (Japan) JEF United Chiba)
23	GK	KOR	Lee Bum-young (from (South Korea) Busan IPark)
25	GK	JPN	Akishige Kaneda (from (Japan) Montedio Yamagata)
29	MF	JPN	Kenta Furube (from (Japan) V-Varen Nagasaki)
30	DF	JPN	Koki Shimosaka (from National Institute of Fitness and Sports in Kanoya)
32	DF	JPN	Takehiro Tomiyasu (promoted from youth ranks)

Out: Note: Flags indicate national team as defined under FIFA eligibility rules; some limited exceptions apply. Players may hold more than one non-FIFA nationality.

No.	Pos.	Nation	Player
—	GK	JPN	Kosuke Nakamura (loan return to (Japan) Kashiwa Reysol)
—	GK	JPN	Eita Kasagawa (to Albirex Niigata Singapore FC)
—	DF	JPN	Yuya Mitsunaga (on loan to (Japan) Azul Claro Numazu)
—	DF	JPN	Masahiro Koga (retired)
—	DF	KOR	Lee Kwang-seon (to (South Korea) Jeju United)
—	MF	JPN	Noriyoshi Sakai (loan return to (Japan) Albirex Niigata)
—	MF	BRA	Moisés Ribeiro Santos (loan return to (Brazil) CA Linense)
—	MF	JPN	Taku Ushinohama (to (Japan) Grulla Morioka)

=== Summer ===
In: Note: Flags indicate national team as defined under FIFA eligibility rules; some limited exceptions apply. Players may hold more than one non-FIFA nationality.

No.	Pos.	Nation	Player
4	MF	JPN	Yuta Mikado (from (Japan) Yokohama F. Marinos)
24	DF	JPN	Yūichi Komano (from (Japan) FC Tokyo)

Out:

== Squad ==
As of 12 July 2016

Squad No.	Name	Nationality	Position(s)	Date of Birth (Age)
Goalkeepers
1	Ryuichi Kamiyama	(Japan)	GK	10 November 1984 (aged 31)
23	Lee Bum-young	(South Korea)	GK	2 April 1989 (aged 26)
25	Akishige Kaneda	(Japan)	GK	26 February 1990 (aged 25)
Defenders
2	Mizuki Hamada	(Japan)	CB / DM	18 May 1990 (aged 25)
3	Takumi Abe	(Japan)	DF	26 May 1991 (aged 24)
5	Yuki Saneto	(Japan)	DF	19 January 1989 (aged 26)
16	Yuta Mishima	(Japan)	DF	10 May 1994 (aged 21)
18	Masashi Kamekawa	(Japan)	DF	28 May 1993 (aged 22)
19	Shunsuke Tsutsumi	(Japan)	RB / CB	8 June 1987 (aged 28)
20	Kim Hyun-hun	(South Korea)	DF	30 April 1991 (aged 24)
21	Takehiro Tomiyasu	(Japan)	DF	5 November 1998 (aged 17)
22	Hokuto Nakamura	(Japan)	DF	10 July 1985 (aged 30)
24	Yūichi Komano	(Japan)	DF	25 July 1981 (aged 34)
26	Yu Tamura	(Japan)	DF	22 November 1992 (aged 23)
30	Koki Shimosaka	(Japan)	DF	25 September 1993 (aged 22)
Midfielders
4	Yuta Mikado	(Japan)	MF	26 December 1986 (aged 29)
6	Danilson Córdoba	(Colombia)	MF	6 September 1986 (aged 29)
8	Shuto Nakahara	(Japan)	MF	29 October 1990 (aged 25)
13	Hirotaka Tameda	(Japan)	MF	24 August 1993 (aged 22)
15	Toshiya Sueyoshi	(Japan)	MF	18 November 1987 (aged 28)
29	Kenta Furube	(Japan)	MF / FW	30 November 1985 (aged 30)
33	Jun Suzuki	(Japan)	MF	22 April 1989 (aged 26)
Strikers
7	Takeshi Kanamori	(Japan)	FW	4 April 1994 (aged 21)
9	Takayuki Nakahara	(Japan)	ST	18 November 1984 (aged 31)
10	Hisashi Jogo	(Japan)	ST / MF	16 April 1986 (aged 29)
11	Daisuke Sakata	(Japan)	FW	16 January 1983 (aged 32)
14	Shoki Hirai	(Japan)	ST	4 December 1987 (aged 28)
17	Wellington	(Brazil)	ST	11 February 1988 (aged 27)
27	Takahiro Kunimoto	(Japan)	ST	8 October 1997 (aged 18)

== Pre-season ==
Win Draw Loss

31 January 2016 1	Kashima Antlers	2–0	Avispa Fukuoka	Miyazaki
14:00 JST	Kakita 4'; Machida (yellow card) 38'; Shoji 38'	Report		Stadium: Miyazaki Athletic Stadium; Attendance: 4,285

2 February 2016 2	JEF United Ichihara Chiba	5–1	Avispa Fukuoka	Miyazaki
09:00 JST	Aranda (yellow card) 9'; Sugajima 11'; Machida 28'; Yoshida 35', 55'; Ide 75' (yellow card) 83'	Report	Sueyoshi (yellow card) 22'; Tamura (yellow card) 34'; Tameda 58'; Jogo (yellow card) 90+2'	Stadium: Miyazaki Athletic Stadium; Referee: Futoshi Nakamura

4 February 2016 3	Avispa Fukuoka	0–0	Roasso Kumamoto	Miyazaki
11:00 JST		Report		Stadium: Miyazaki Athletic Stadium

== Competitions ==
=== Overall ===
Competition	Started round	Current position / round	Final position / round	First match	Last match
J1 League	—	18th		27 February 2016	
J.League Cup	Group stage	2nd		23 March 2016	

Updated to match played 5 July 2016
Source: Competitions

=== Overview ===
Competition	Record							
Competition	G	W	D	L	GF	GA	GD	Win %
J1 League	27	3	7	17	20	44	−24	11.11
Emperor's Cup	2	1	1	0	9	4	+5	50.00
J.League Cup	8	2	4	2	10	10	+0	25.00
Total	37	6	12	19	39	58	−19	16.22

Updated to match played 7 September 2016
Source: Competitions

=== J1 League ===
==== First stage ====
Pos	Team	Pld	W	D	L	GF	GA	GD	Pts
14	Nagoya Grampus	17	4	5	8	24	29	−5	17
15	Sagan Tosu	17	4	5	8	10	15	−5	17
16	Shonan Bellmare	17	4	4	9	18	27	−9	16
17	Ventforet Kofu	17	3	6	8	18	31	−13	15
18	Avispa Fukuoka	17	2	5	10	11	25	−14	11

Source: 2016 MEIJI YASUDA J1 LEAGUE 1st Stage League table
Rules for classification: 1) Points; 2) Goal difference; 3) Goals scored.

===== Results summary =====
Overall								Home						Away					
Pld	W	D	L	GF	GA	GD	Pts	W	D	L	GF	GA	GD	W	D	L	GF	GA	GD
17	2	5	10	11	25	−14	11	1	3	4	5	11	−6	1	2	6	6	14	−8

Last updated: 5 July 2016.
Source: Competitive matches

===== Results by matchday =====
Matchday	1	2	3	4	5	6	7	8	9	10	11	12	13	14	15	16	17
Ground	A	H	A	A	H	A	H	A	H	A	H	A	H	H	A	H	A
Result	L	D	L	D	L	D	L	W	L	L	W	L	L	D	L	D	L
Position	10	15	18	18	18	17	17	17	17	18	18	17	17	18	18	18	18

Updated to match(es) played on 12 July. Source:
A = Away; H = Home; W = Win; D = Draw; L = Loss

===== Matches =====
Win Draw Loss

27 February 2016 1	Sagan Tosu	2–1	Avispa Fukuoka	Tosu
12:00 JST	Fujita (yellow card) 2'; Toyoda 8' (yellow card) 26'; Kim Min-woo (yellow card) 36'; Okada 51'; Taniguchi (yellow card) 65'	Report	Wellington (yellow card) 6' (goal) 71'; Kim Hyun-hun (yellow card) 19'; Saneto (yellow card) 55'; Sakata (yellow card) 69'	Stadium: Tosu Stadium; Attendance: 19,762; Referee: Nobutsugu Murakami

5 March 2016 2	Avispa Fukuoka	1–1	Yokohama F. Marinos	Hakata-ku, Fukuoka
17:00 JST	Wellington 6'	Report	Saitō (yellow card) 38'; Kobayashi (yellow card) 44'; Kida (yellow card) 57'; Nakamura 82'; Fábio Aguiar (yellow card) 90+1'; Nakagawa (yellow card) 90+4'	Stadium: Level5 Stadium; Attendance: 16,968; Referee: Futoshi Nakamura

12 March 2015 3	Urawa Red Diamonds	2–0	Avispa Fukuoka	Saitama
12:00 JST	Koroki 18', 51'	Report	Kamekawa (yellow card) 41'; Córdoba (yellow card) 74'	Stadium: Saitama Stadium 2002; Attendance: 27,946; Referee: Masuya Ueda

19 March 2016 4	Júbilo Iwata	2–2	Avispa Fukuoka	Iwata
17:00 JST	Bothroyd 16' (pen.), 72'; Kobayashi (yellow card) 89'	Report	Wellington 4'; Córdoba (yellow card) 38'; Jogo 45+2'; Tameda (yellow card) 70'; Kim Hyun-hun (yellow card) 89'; Hamada (yellow card) 90+2'	Stadium: Yamaha Stadium; Attendance: 11,002; Referee: Tomohiro Inoue

2 April 2016 5	Avispa Fukuoka	0–1	Albirex Niigata	Hakata-ku, Fukuoka
12:00 JST	Tameda (yellow card) 45+2'; Suzuki (yellow card) 90'	Report	Kobayashi (yellow card) 36'; Tanaka 41'	Stadium: Level5 Stadium; Attendance: 9,479; Referee: Masaaki Toma

10 April 2016 6	Vissel Kobe	0–0	Avispa Fukuoka	Kobe
11:00 JST	Inoha (yellow card) 22'; Pedro Júnior (yellow card) 77'	Report		Stadium: Misaki Park Stadium; Attendance: 21,254; Referee: Koichiro Fukushima

24 April 2016 7	Avispa Fukuoka	0–1	Gamba Osaka	Hakata-ku, Fukuoka
11:00 JST	Kim Hyun-hun (yellow card) 87'	Report	Usami 79'	Stadium: Level5 Stadium; Attendance: 18,508; Referee: Tomohiro Inoue

29 April 2016 8	FC Tokyo	0–1	Avispa Fukuoka	Chōfu, Tokyo
15:00 JST	Morishige (yellow card) 34'; Yonemoto (yellow card) 89'	Report	Wellington (yellow card) 23' (goal) 61'; Sueyoshi (yellow card) 29'; Saneto (yellow card) 71'	Stadium: Ajinomoto Stadium; Attendance: 23,625; Referee: Kenji Ogiya

4 May 2016 9	Avispa Fukuoka	1–2	Omiya Ardija	Hakata-ku, Fukuoka
12:00 JST	Kanamori 61'; T. Nakahara (yellow card) 88'	Report	Yokoyama 15'; Numata 48'	Stadium: Level5 Stadium; Attendance: 12,418; Referee: Nobutsugu Murakami

8 May 2016 10	Vegalta Sendai	2–0	Avispa Fukuoka	Sendai
13:00 JST	Ishikawa 33'; Watanabe 53'	Report	Tsutsumi (yellow card) 66'	Stadium: Yurtec Stadium Sendai; Attendance: 12,504; Referee: Yoshiro Imamura

14 May 2016 11	Avispa Fukuoka	1–0	Shonan Bellmare	Hakata-ku, Fukuoka
12:00 JST	Jogo 81'	Report	Shimamura (yellow card) 84'; Kamiya (yellow card) 90+3'	Stadium: Level5 Stadium; Attendance: 8,048; Referee: Yudai Yamamoto

21 May 2016 12	Kashiwa Reysol	3–2	Avispa Fukuoka	Kashiwa
13:00 JST	Taketomi 6'; Akino (yellow card) 63'; Diego Oliveira 80'; Wako 86'	Report	Nakamura (yellow card) 18'; Kunimoto 56'; Jogo 59'	Stadium: Hitachi Kashiwa Soccer Stadium; Attendance: 8,011; Referee: Akihiko Ikeuchi

29 May 2016 13	Avispa Fukuoka	0–4	Sanfrecce Hiroshima	Hakata-ku, Fukuoka
12:00 JST		Report	Utaka 18'; Miyayoshi 31', 53'; Shibasaki 36'	Stadium: Level5 Stadium; Attendance: 13,264; Referee: Itaru Hirose

2 June 2016 14	Avispa Fukuoka	0–0	Nagoya Grampus	Hakata-ku, Fukuoka
17:00 JST	Córdoba (yellow card) 53'	Report	Öhman (yellow card) 28'; Yasuda (yellow card) 59'; Kobayashi (yellow card) 62'	Stadium: Level5 Stadium; Attendance: 5,870; Referee: Yoshiro Imamura

11 June 2016 15	Ventforet Kofu	1–0	Avispa Fukuoka	Kofu
13:30 JST	Celeski 42'	Report	Kamekawa (yellow card) 63'	Stadium: Yamanashi Chuo Bank Stadium; Attendance: 8,133

18 June 2016 16	Avispa Fukuoka	2–2	Kawasaki Frontale	Hakata-ku, Fukuoka
17:00 JST	Kanamori 9', 15'; Kunimoto (yellow card) 59'; Lee Bum-young (yellow card) 72'; Kamekawa (yellow card) 90+2'	Report	Yu Kobayashi 42'; Ōkubo 73' (pen.)	Stadium: Level5 Stadium; Attendance: 18,226; Referee: Yuichi Nishimura

25 June 2016 17	Kashima Antlers	2–0	Avispa Fukuoka	Kashima
17:00 JST	Yamamoto 27'; Doi 37'; Nishi (yellow card) 37'	Report	Córdoba (yellow card) 38'	Stadium: Kashima Soccer Stadium; Attendance: 31,636; Referee: Nobutsugu Murakami

==== Second stage ====
Pos	Team	Pld	W	D	L	GF	GA	GD	Pts
14	Júbilo Iwata	17	2	7	8	16	27	−11	13
15	Nagoya Grampus	17	3	4	10	14	29	−15	13
16	Albirex Niigata	17	4	0	13	14	24	−10	12
17	Shonan Bellmare	17	3	2	12	12	29	−17	11
18	Avispa Fukuoka	17	2	2	13	15	41	−26	8

Source: 2016 MEIJI YASUDA J1 LEAGUE 2nd Stage League table
Rules for classification: 1) Points; 2) Goal difference; 3) Goals scored.

===== Results summary =====
Overall								Home						Away					
Pld	W	D	L	GF	GA	GD	Pts	W	D	L	GF	GA	GD	W	D	L	GF	GA	GD
10	1	2	7	9	19	−10	5	1	1	4	9	12	−3	0	1	3	0	7	−7

Last updated: 2 September 2016.
Source: Competitive matches

===== Results by matchday =====
Matchday	1	2	3	4	5	6	7	8	9	10	11	12	13	14	15	16	17
Ground	H	A	H	A	H	H	A	H	A	H	A	A	H	A	H	A	H
Result	L	L	W	D	L	D	L	L	L	L							
Position	11	15	12	11	14	13	14	15	16	16							

Updated to match(es) played on 2 September. Source:
A = Away; H = Home; W = Win; D = Draw; L = Loss

===== Matches =====
Win Draw Loss Upcoming fixture

2 July 2016 1	Avispa Fukuoka	1–2	Urawa Red Diamonds	Hakata-ku, Fukuoka
17:00 JST	Wellington 24' (pen.) (yellow card) 40'; Tamura (yellow card) 42'; Kamekawa (yellow card) 45+2'; Córdoba (yellow card) 63'; Hamada (red card) 90+5'	Report	Ugajin (yellow card) 4'; Makino (red card) 22'; Sekine (yellow card) 42'; Nasu 43'; Koroki 64'	Stadium: Level5 Stadium; Attendance: 18,509; Referee: Akihiko Ikeuchi

9 July 2016 2	Yokohama F. Marinos	3–0	Avispa Fukuoka	Yokohama
17:00 JST	Saitō 38'; Togashi 48'; Ito 90+3'	Report	Kim Hyun-hun (yellow card) 36'; Tamura (yellow card) 63'; Komano (yellow card) 68'	Stadium: International Stadium Yokohama; Attendance: 19,052; Referee: Ryuji Sato

13 July 2016 3	Avispa Fukuoka	2–1	FC Tokyo	Hakata-ku, Fukuoka
17:00 JST	Jogo 60'; Hamada 90+2'	Report	Hashimoto 50'	Stadium: Level5 Stadium; Attendance: 6,497; Referee: Koichiro Fukushima

17 July 2016 4	Gamba Osaka	0–0	Avispa Fukuoka	Suita
17:00 JST	Iwashita (yellow card) 56'; Endō (yellow card) 86'	Report		Stadium: Suita City Football Stadium; Attendance: 23,540; Referee: Takuto Okabe

23 July 2016 5	Avispa Fukuoka	2–3	Sagan Tosu	Hakata-ku, Fukuoka
17:00 JST	Hamada (yellow card) 45+2'; Fukuta 50' (o.g.); Saneto (yellow card) 86' (goal) 90+4'	Report	Toyoda (yellow card) 20'; Kamada 59'; Fujita 76'; Tomiyama 87'; Hayasaka (yellow card) 90+1'	Stadium: Level5 Stadium; Attendance: 19,370; Referee: Yudai Yamamoto

30 July 2016 6	Avispa Fukuoka	1–1	Vegalta Sendai	Hakata-ku, Fukuoka
16:30 JST	Mikado (yellow card) 35'; Komano (yellow card) 50'; Sakata 57'	Report	Wilson 36'	Stadium: Level5 Stadium; Attendance: 10,097; Referee: Kenji Ogiya

6 August 2016 7	Omiya Ardija	1–0	Avispa Fukuoka	Ōmiya-ku, Saitama
17:00 JST	Ienaga 62'	Report	Saneto (yellow card) 69'	Stadium: NACK5 Stadium Omiya; Attendance: 10,106; Referee: Tomohiro Inoue

14 August 2016 8	Avispa Fukuoka	1–2	Kashima Antlers	Hakata-ku, Fukuoka
17:00 JST	Hamada (yellow card) 42' (yellow card) 87' (red card); Kakita 90+5' (o.g.)	Report	Akasaki 27'; Suzuki 80'	Stadium: Level5 Stadium; Attendance: 16,530; Referee: Yuichi Nishimura

20 August 2016 9	Albirex Niigata	3–0	Avispa Fukuoka	Niigata
17:00 JST	Rafael Silva 55'; Yamazaki (yellow card) 60'; Léo Silva 81' (pen.), 90+2'	Report	Tomiyasu (yellow card) 43'; Kim Hyun-hun (yellow card) 57'	Stadium: Denka Big Swan Stadium; Attendance: 19,805; Referee: Nobutsugu Murakami

24 August 2016 10	Avispa Fukuoka	2–3	Júbilo Iwata	Hakata-ku, Fukuoka
17:00 JST	Jogo 19'; Tameda 56'	Report	Adaílton 9', 63'; Fujita (yellow card) 49'; Miyazaki (yellow card) 58'; Papadopoulos 69'	Stadium: Level5 Stadium; Attendance: 10,059; Referee: Yusuke Araki

==== Overall results ====
Pos	Team	Pld	W	D	L	GF	GA	GD	Pts	Qualification or relegation
14	Ventforet Kofu	34	7	10	17	32	58	−26	31	
15	Albirex Niigata	34	8	6	20	33	49	−16	30	
16	Nagoya Grampus (R)	34	7	9	18	38	58	−20	30	Relegation to 2017 J2 League
17	Shonan Bellmare (R)	34	7	6	21	30	56	−26	27	Relegation to 2017 J2 League
18	Avispa Fukuoka (R)	34	4	7	23	26	66	−40	19	Relegation to 2017 J2 League

Source: Meiji Yasuda J1 League
Rules for classification: 1) Points; 2) Goal difference; 3) Goals scored.
(R) Relegated

=== Emperor's Cup ===
28 August 2016 Round 1	Avispa Fukuoka	7–2	Kagoshima United	Hakata-ku, Fukuoka
16:00 JST	S. Nakahara 12'; Tamura 28'; 60' (o.g.); Shimosaka (yellow card) 68'; Kunimoto 75'; Kanamori 80'; Mishima 87'; Sueyoshi 90'	Report	Fujimoto 9', 45+1'	Stadium: Level5 Stadium; Attendance: 1,731; Referee: Yoshiro Imamura

7 September 2016 Round 2	Avispa Fukuoka	2–2 (a.e.t.) (2-4 p)	Renofa Yamaguchi	Hakata-ku, Fukuoka
19:00	Kunimoto 51', 103'	report	Torikai 49'; Hoshi 120'	Stadium: Level-5 Stadium; Attendance: 1,690; Referee: Koichiro Fukushima
	Penalties
	Sueyoshi (penalty scored); Saneto (penalty missed); Jogo (penalty missed); Mikado (penalty scored)		(penalty scored) Nakayama; (penalty scored) Miyuki; (penalty scored) Fukumitsu; (penalty scored) Shoji

=== J.League Cup ===
As a result of their promotion, Avispa Fukuoka would qualify in the 2016 J.League Cup. They were put in Group B alongside Yokohama F. Marinos, Kawasaki Frontale, Kashiwa Reysol, Vegalta Sendai, Albirex Niigata, and Sagan Tosu. Avispa Fukuoka recorded two wins and only one loss out of six matches, including a 1-0 away win versus Kawasaki Frontale and a 4-2 home win against Albirex Niigata, and thus qualified for the quarter-finals after finishing second on the table, much to the surprise of many as they were fighting in the relegation zone most of the time in their first season back in the top flight.

==== Group stage ====
Pos	Team	Pld	W	D	L	GF	GA	GD	Pts	Qualification
1	Yokohama F. Marinos	6	3	2	1	7	5	+2	11	Knock-out stage
2	Avispa Fukuoka	6	2	3	1	9	7	+2	9	Knock-out stage
3	Kawasaki Frontale	6	2	2	2	9	5	+4	8	
4	Kashiwa Reysol	6	2	2	2	9	8	+1	8	
5	Vegalta Sendai	6	2	2	2	4	5	−1	8	

Updated to match(es) played on 5 June 2016. Source: 2016J.League Yamazaki Nabisco Cup Group Stage Group B League table and J. League Data
Rules for classification: 1) Points; 2) Goal difference; 3) Goals scored; 4) Head-to-head points; 5) Head-to-head goal difference; 6) Fair-play points; 7) Draw.

Win Draw Loss Upcoming fixture

23 March 2016 1	Avispa Fukuoka	2–2	Kashiwa Reysol	Level-5 Stadium, Fukuoka
19:00	Jogo 17'; Wellington 30'; Hamada (yellow card) 36'; Kim Hyun-hun (yellow card) 40'	Report	Kamata (yellow card) 29'; Wako 55'; Imai (yellow card) 62'; Tanaka 77'; Ōtsu (yellow card) 90+3'	Attendance: 5,525; Referee: Jumpei Iida

27 March 2016 2	Kawasaki Frontale	0–1	Avispa Fukuoka	Todoroki Athletics Stadium, Kawasaki
15:03		Report	Suzuki (yellow card) 42'; Tamura (yellow card) 50' (goal) 79'	Attendance: 11,510; Referee: Akihiko Ikeuchi

20 April 2016 3	Vegalta Sendai	0–0	Avispa Fukuoka	Yurtec Stadium Sendai, Sendai
19:00	Hachisuka (yellow card) 46'; Sashinami (yellow card) 57'; Fujimura (yellow card) 86'; Mita (yellow card) 90+2'	Report	Hamada (yellow card) 17'; Kamekawa (yellow card) 33'	Attendance: 5,956; Referee: Yusuke Araki

18 May 2016 4	Yokohama F. Marinos	2–1	Avispa Fukuoka	Nippatsu Mitsuzawa Stadium, Yokohama
19:30	Hyodo 73' (pen.); Ito 90+4'; Ito (yellow card) 90+5'	Report	Hirai 31'; Kunimoto (yellow card) 90+1'	Attendance: 5,133; Referee: Shoichiro Mikami

25 May 2016 5	Avispa Fukuoka	1–1	Sagan Tosu	Level-5 Stadium, Fukuoka
19:00	Tomiyasu (yellow card) 7' (yellow-red card) 45'; Hamada (yellow card) 13'; Kanamori (yellow card) 54'; Tamura (yellow card) 60'; Hirai 85'	Report	Okamoto (yellow card) 41'; Toyoda 45' (pen.); Ikeda (yellow card) 90'	Attendance: 14,465; Referee: Kenji Ogiya

5 June 2016 6	Avispa Fukuoka	4–2	Albirex Niigata	Level-5 Stadium, Fukuoka
14:00	Kanamori 16', 37'; Hirai 19'; Nakamura (yellow card) 62'; Jogo 68'	Report	Yamazaki 6'; Matsubara (yellow card) 56'; Suzuki 82'	Attendance: 7,209; Referee: Hajime Matsuo

==== Quarter-finals ====
Avispa Fukuoka were seeded against fourth-place finisher FC Tokyo, and would play their games on 31 August and 4 September. They drew the first leg 1-1 at Ajinomoto Stadium in Chōfu, but could not get a win on their second leg as they lost 0-2 in Hakata-ku, Fukuoka.

31 August 2016 First leg	FC Tokyo	1–1	Avispa Fukuoka	Chōfu
19:30	Nakajima 62'	Report	Mishima 90'	Stadium: Ajinomoto Stadium; Attendance: 6,882; Referee: Takuto Okabe

4 September 2016 Second leg	Avispa Fukuoka	0–2 (1–3 agg.)	FC Tokyo	Hakata-ku, Fukuoka
19:04		Report	Tanabe 30'; Takahashi 75'	Stadium: Level5 Stadium; Attendance: 8,060; Referee: Kenji Ogiya

== Statistics ==
=== Appearances and goals ===
Updated to matches played on 7 September 2016.

No.	Pos	Nat	Player	Total		J1 League		J.League Cup		Emperor's Cup	
No.	Pos	Nat	Player	Apps	Goals	Apps	Goals	Apps	Goals	Apps	Goals
1	GK	(Japan) JPN	Ryuichi Kamiyama	13	0	8	0	4	0	1	0
2	DF	(Japan) JPN	Mizuki Hamada	19	1	14	1	5	0	0	0
3	DF	(Japan) JPN	Takumi Abe	6	0	1	0	2+1	0	2	0
4	MF	(Japan) JPN	Yuta Mikado	11	0	10	0	0	0	0+1	0
5	DF	(Japan) JPN	Yuki Saneto	21	1	16+1	1	2+1	0	1	0
6	MF	(Colombia) COL	Danilson Córdoba	15	0	10+2	0	3	0	0	0
7	FW	(Japan) JPN	Takeshi Kanamori	30	4	19+4	1	5	2	0+2	1
8	MF	(Japan) JPN	Shuto Nakahara	6	1	0+2	0	1+1	0	2	1
9	FW	(Japan) JPN	Takayuki Nakahara	4	0	0+2	0	0+2	0	0	0
10	FW	(Japan) JPN	Hisashi Jogo	36	7	27	5	4+4	2	0+1	0
11	FW	(Japan) JPN	Daisuke Sakata	27	0	7+15	0	0+5	0	0	0
13	MF	(Japan) JPN	Hirotaka Tameda	27	1	13+6	1	7	0	0+1	0
14	FW	(Japan) JPN	Shoki Hirai	27	3	4+18	0	4+1	3	0	0
15	MF	(Japan) JPN	Toshiya Sueyoshi	28	1	19+3	0	3+1	0	2	1
16	DF	(Japan) JPN	Yuta Mishima	9	2	0+4	0	1+2	1	2	1
17	FW	(Brazil) BRA	Wellington	23	6	19+2	5	2	1	0	0
18	DF	(Japan) JPN	Masashi Kamekawa	24	0	20	0	4	0	0	0
19	DF	(Japan) JPN	Shunsuke Tsutsumi	18	0	13	0	3	0	2	0
20	DF	(South Korea) KOR	Kim Hyun-hun	32	0	25	0	7	0	0	0
21	DF	(Japan) JPN	Takehiro Tomiyasu	12	0	5+1	0	5	0	0+1	0
22	DF	(Japan) JPN	Hokuto Nakamura	17	0	11+1	0	4	0	1	0
23	GK	(South Korea) KOR	Lee Bum-young	24	0	19	0	4	0	1	0
24	DF	(Japan) JPN	Yūichi Komano	7	0	5+2	0	0	0	0	0
25	GK	(Japan) JPN	Akishige Kaneda	0	0	0	0	0	0	0	0
26	DF	(Japan) JPN	Yu Tamura	20	2	12+1	0	6	1	1	1
27	MF	(Japan) JPN	Takahiro Kunimoto	22	6	7+7	3	3+3	0	2	3
29	MF	(Japan) JPN	Kenta Furube	7	0	3	0	3	0	1	0
30	DF	(Japan) JPN	Koki Shimosaka	5	0	0	0	1+2	0	2	0
33	MF	(Japan) JPN	Jun Suzuki	16	0	7+2	0	5	0	2	0
Players currently out on loan:
	FW	(Japan) JPN	Daisuke Ishizu	0	0	0	0	0	0	0	0

=== Cards ===
Accounts for all competitions. Updated to matches played on 7 September 2016.

No.	Pos.	Name	Yellow card	Red card
2	DF	(Japan) Mizuki Hamada	7	2
3	DF	(Japan) Takumi Abe	1	0
4	MF	(Japan) Yuta Mikado	2	0
5	DF	(Japan) Yuki Saneto	4	0
6	MF	(Colombia) Danilson Córdoba	5	0
7	FW	(Japan) Takeshi Kanamori	2	0
9	FW	(Japan) Takayuki Nakahara	1	0
11	FW	(Japan) Daisuke Sakata	1	0
13	MF	(Japan) Hirotaka Tameda	2	0
15	MF	(Japan) Toshiya Sueyoshi	1	0
17	FW	(Brazil) Wellington	3	0
18	DF	(Japan) Masashi Kamekawa	5	0
19	DF	(Japan) Shunsuke Tsutsumi	1	0
20	DF	(South Korea) Kim Hyun-hun	7	0
21	DF	(Japan) Takehiro Tomiyasu	1	1
22	DF	(Japan) Hokuto Nakamura	3	0
23	GK	(South Korea) Lee Bum-young	1	0
24	DF	(Japan) Yūichi Komano	2	0
26	DF	(Japan) Yu Tamura	4	0
27	MF	(Japan) Takahiro Kunimoto	2	0
30	DF	(Japan) Koki Shimosaka	1	0
33	MF	(Japan) Jun Suzuki	2	0
