= Mizuki Hamada =

Japanese football defender (born 1990)

Mizuki Hamada 濱田 水輝
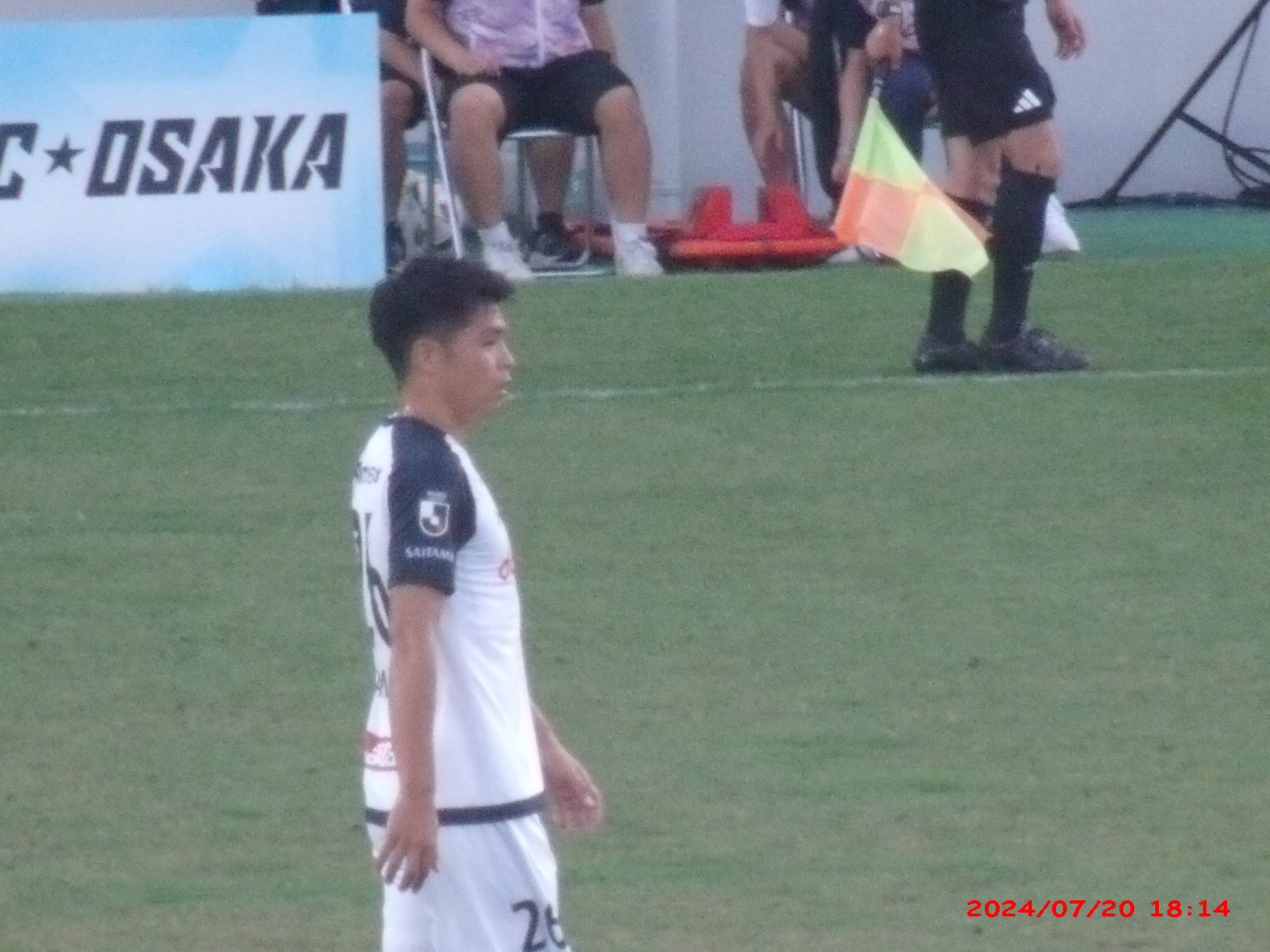

Personal information
- Full name: Mizuki Hamada
- Date of birth: 18 May 1990 (age 36)
- Place of birth: New Jersey, United States
- Height: 1.85 m (6 ft 1 in)
- Positions: Centre-back; defensive midfielder

Team information
- Current team: RB Omiya Ardija
- Number: 26

Youth career
- FC Wako Little Eleven
- De Anza Heaters
- –2005: Santa Clara Sporting Ruckus
- 2006–2008: Urawa Red Diamonds

Senior career*
| Years | Team | Apps | (Gls) |
| 2009–2014 | Urawa Red Diamonds | 27 | (0) |
| 2013 | → Albirex Niigata (loan) | 6 | (0) |
| 2015–2017 | Avispa Fukuoka | 49 | (5) |
| 2018–2023 | Fagiano Okayama | 123 | (5) |
| 2024– | Omiya Ardija/RB Omiya Ardija | 23 | (2) |

International career
| 2011 | Japan U22 | 11 | (2) |
Medal record
Representing Japan
AFC U-16 Championship
| Gold medal – first place | 2006 Singapore |
- * Club domestic league appearances and goals as of 10:30, 19 August 2025 (UTC)

Mizuki Hamada (濱田 水輝, Hamada Mizuki; born 18 May 1990) is professional footballer who plays as a centre-back or defensive midfielder for J2 League club RB Omiya Ardija. Born in the United States, he represented Japan at youth international level.

== Playing career ==
Hamada was a member of the United States under-15 squad, as well as Japanese under-17 and under-18 teams. On 10 August 2008, Hamada, along with three others, was promoted to the first team of the Reds. Hamada has been a part of both the US and Japan youth football programs.

== Career statistics ==
=== Club ===
As of match played 20 April 2025

Appearances and goals by club, season and competition
| Club | Season | League | | | Emperor's Cup | | J.League Cup | | Total | |
| Club | Season | Division | Apps | Goals | Apps | Goals | Apps | Goals | Apps | Goals |
|---|---|---|---|---|---|---|---|---|---|---|
| Urawa Red Diamonds | 2009 | J. League Division 1 | 1 | 0 | 0 | 0 | 4 | 0 | 5 | 0 |
| Urawa Red Diamonds | 2010 | J. League Division 1 | 4 | 0 | 3 | 0 | 0 | 0 | 7 | 0 |
| Urawa Red Diamonds | 2011 | J. League Division 1 | 4 | 0 | 3 | 0 | 3 | 0 | 10 | 0 |
| Urawa Red Diamonds | 2012 | J. League Division 1 | 13 | 0 | 1 | 0 | 6 | 0 | 20 | 0 |
| Urawa Red Diamonds | 2014 | J. League Division 1 | 5 | 0 | 1 | 0 | 3 | 1 | 9 | 1 |
| Urawa Red Diamonds | Total | | 27 | 0 | 8 | 0 | 16 | 1 | 51 | 1 |
| Albirex Niigata | 2013 | J. League Division 1 | 6 | 0 | 1 | 0 | 6 | 1 | 13 | 1 |
| Avispa Fukuoka | 2015 | J2 League | 26 | 4 | 1 | 0 | — | | 27 | 4 |
| Avispa Fukuoka | 2016 | J1 League | 19 | 1 | 0 | 0 | 5 | 0 | 24 | 1 |
| Avispa Fukuoka | 2017 | J2 League | 4 | 0 | 2 | 0 | — | | 6 | 0 |
| Avispa Fukuoka | Total | | 49 | 5 | 3 | 0 | 5 | 0 | 57 | 5 |
| Fagiano Okayama | 2018 | J2 League | 23 | 3 | 0 | 0 | — | | 23 | 3 |
| Fagiano Okayama | 2019 | J2 League | 16 | 0 | 1 | 0 | — | | 17 | 0 |
| Fagiano Okayama | 2020 | J2 League | 40 | 1 | 0 | 0 | — | | 40 | 1 |
| Fagiano Okayama | 2021 | J2 League | 29 | 0 | 1 | 0 | — | | 30 | 0 |
| Fagiano Okayama | 2022 | J2 League | 12 | 1 | 1 | 0 | — | | 13 | 1 |
| Fagiano Okayama | 2023 | J2 League | 3 | 0 | 2 | 0 | — | | 5 | 0 |
| Fagiano Okayama | Total | | 123 | 5 | 5 | 0 | — | | 128 | 5 |
| RB Omiya Ardija | 2024 | J3 League | 18 | 1 | 0 | 0 | 1 | 0 | 19 | 1 |
| RB Omiya Ardija | 2025 | J2 League | 5 | 1 | 0 | 0 | 1 | 0 | 6 | 1 |
| RB Omiya Ardija | Total | | 23 | 2 | 0 | 0 | 2 | 0 | 25 | 2 |
| Career total | | | 228 | 12 | 17 | 0 | 29 | 2 | 274 | 12 |

=== International ===
As of 27 November 2011

| National team | Year | Apps | Goals |
|---|---|---|---|
Japan U22
| Japan U22 | 2011 | 11 | 2 |

International appearances and goals
| # | Date | Venue | Opponent | Result | Goal | Competition |
2011
| | 9 February | Mohammed Al-Hamad Stadium, Hawalli | Kuwait | 0–3 | 0 | Friendly / Japan U22 |
| | 12 February | Bahrain National Stadium, Manama | Bahrain U22 | 2–0 | 0 | Friendly / Japan U22 |
| | 26 March | Pakhtakor Markaziy Stadium, Tashkent | Uzbekistan U22 | 0–1 | 0 | Friendly / Japan U22 |
| | 29 March | JAR Stadium, Tashkent | Uzbekistan U22 | 2–1 | 0 | Friendly / Japan U22 |
| | 1 June | Niigata Stadium, Niigata | Australia U22 | 3–1 | 0 | Friendly / Japan U22 |
| | 19 June | Toyota Stadium, Toyota | Kuwait U22 | 3–1 | 1 | 2012 Summer Olympics qualification / Japan U22 |
| | 23 June | Mohammed Al-Hamad Stadium, Hawalli | Kuwait U22 | 1–2 | 0 | 2012 Summer Olympics qualification / Japan U22 |
| | 10 August | Sapporo Dome, Sapporo | Egypt U22 | 2–1 | 0 | Friendly / Japan U22 |
| | 21 September | Tosu Stadium, Tosu | Malaysia U22 | 2–0 | 0 | 2012 Summer Olympics qualification / Japan U22 |
| | 22 November | Bahrain National Stadium, Manama | Bahrain U22 | 2–0 | 0 | 2012 Summer Olympics qualification / Japan U22 |
| | 27 November | National Olympic Stadium, Tokyo | Syria U22 | 2–1 | 1 | 2012 Summer Olympics qualification / Japan U22 |

== Honours ==
RB Omiya Ardija

- J3 League: 2024

Japan U17

- AFC U-17 Championship: 2006
