= Shuto Nakahara =

Japanese footballer (born 1990)

Shuto Nakahara 中原 秀人
Personal information
- Full name: Shuto Nakahara
- Date of birth: October 29, 1990 (age 36)
- Place of birth: Kagoshima, Japan
- Height: 1.70 m (5 ft 7 in)
- Position: Midfielder

Team information
- Current team: Kagoshima United FC
- Number: 35

Youth career
- 2009–2012: University of Teacher; Education Fukuoka

Senior career*
Years	Team	Apps	(Gls)
2012	Giravanz Kitakyushu	5	(1)
2013–2016	Avispa Fukuoka	96	(2)
2017	Giravanz Kitakyushu	5	(0)
2017–	Kagoshima United FC	34	(4)
- * Club domestic league appearances and goals as of 5 January 2019

Shuto Nakahara (中原 秀人, Nakahara Shūto; born October 29, 1990) is a retired Japanese football player who played as largely as a defensive midfielder during his career. His last club was ReinMeer Aomori FC in the Japan Football League (JFL), the fourth tier of Japanese Football.

Born in Kagoshima Prefecture, he began his professional career with Giravanz Kitakyushu in 2012 before playing for Avispa Fukuoka from 2013 to 2016, playing with notable footballers such as Takehiro Tomiyasu and Yuki Saneto.

Nakahara has played in the J1 League, J2 League, J3 League and Japan Football League, as well as the J.League Cup, Emperor's Cup and J1 promotion play-offs. His longest spells were in the J2 and J3 leagues. He spent the bulk of his career at Kagoshima United FC from 2017 to 2025.

His J3 League career included four goals in 2018 and four in 2021, his highest single-season league totals. He also recorded five assists in the 2020 J3 League season with Kagoshima United.

== Early Life ==
Shuto Nakahara was born October 29, 1990 in Kagoshima, Japan. His younger brother Yusei was also a professional footballer, who also played for Kagoshima United during his active career.

Shuto started playing football with Partida Kagoshima, where he progressed through the U-12 and U-15 teams before his enrollment into Saga Higashi High School. After graudating from Saga Higashi High School, Nakahara enrolled into Fukuoka University of Education in 2009. He played for the university's football team, the Kyushu University Select Team, from 2010-2012. In 2012, he played in the 36th Prime Minister's All Japan University Soccer Tournament.

== Club Career ==
=== Giranvanz Kitakyushu ===
Nakahara joined Giranvanz Kitakyushu on loan from Fukuoka University of Education in September 2011, although he did not manage to make a first-team appearance. He returned to the club on loan in March 2012 and made his professional debut in the J2 League on 3 May 2012, appearing as a substitute in a 1-0 defeat away to FC Machida Zelvia.

He scored his first professional goal on 12 May 2012 in a 2-2 draw against Ehime FC. During the 2012 season, he made five J2 league appearances and scored once.

=== Avispa Fukuoka ===
Nakahara joined Avispa Fukuoka in January 2013. He became a regular member of the squad during the 2013 J2 League season, making 38 league appearances and scoring once.

In 2014, he appeared in all 40 of Avispa's J2 League matches, recording four assists. His playing time decreased in 2015, when he made 16 league aperances and scored once. He also appeared in the J2 promotion play-offs as Avispa secured promotion to the J1 League.

Nakahara made his J1 League debut during the 2016 season. He made two league appearances as Avispa finished 18th and were relegated to J2. He also played in the J.League Cup and Emperor's Cup, scoring in an Emperor's CUp match against Kagoshima United.

Across his four seasons with Avispa, Nakahara made 96 league appearances.

=== Return to Giravanz Kitakyushu ===
Following Avispa's relegation, Nakahara returned to Giravanz Kitakyushu in January 2017. He made five J3 league appearances before moving to Kagoshima United.

=== Kagoshima United ===
Nakahara joined Kagoshima United in August 2017. He became a regular member of the team from the 2018 season, making 29 J3 league aperances and scoring four goals as Kagoshima finished second and gained promotion to the J2 League.

In 2017, Shuto managed to obtain his first and only card in Ultimate Team History, with a 58 OVR.

In 2019, Nakahara made 28 league appreances and scored twice. The club finished 21st and were relegated to J3. He remained with the club, making 25 appearances in 2020, 28 in 2021 and 28 in 2022.

Kagoshima finished 3rd in the 2022 J3 League season. In 2023, Nakahara made 29 league appreances and scored twice as the club finished sceond and secured promotion to J2.

In his final season with Kagoshima in 2024, Nakahara made 11 J2 appearances and also played in the Emperor's Cup and J.League Cup.

=== ReinMeer Aomori (2025-2026) ===
Nakahara joined ReinMeer Aomori in January 2025 following the expiration of his contract with Kagoshima United. He signed a one-year contract with the JFL Club. He made eight league appearances and two appearances in the Emperor's Cup.

On 1st February 2026, Nakahara announced his retirement from football.

== Club statistics ==
Updated to 2026 season.

Club performance			League		Cup		League Cup		Other		Total	
Season	Club	League	Apps	Goals	Apps	Goals	Apps	Goals	Apps	Goals	Apps	Goals
Japan			League		Emperor's Cup		J. League Cup		Other^{1}		Total	
2012	Giravanz Kitakyushu	J2 League	5	1	0	0	–		–		5	1
2013	Avispa Fukuoka	J2 League	38	1	0	0	–		–		38	1
2014	Avispa Fukuoka	J2 League	40	0	0	0	–		–		40	0
2015	Avispa Fukuoka	J2 League	16	1	2	0	–		2	0	20	1
2016	Avispa Fukuoka	J1 League	2	0	2	1	2	0	–		6	1
2017	Giravanz Kitakyushu	J3 League	5	0	3	0	–		–		8	0
2017	Kagoshima United FC	J3 League	5	0	–		–		–		5	0
2018 J3 League	Kagoshima United FC	J3 League	29	4	1	0	–		–		30	4
2019	Kagoshima United FC	J2 League	28	2	0	0	–					
2020	Kagoshima United FC	J3 League	25	1	0	0	–					
2021	Kagoshima United FC	J3 League	28	4	2	0	–					
2022	Kagoshima United FC	J3 League	28	2	1	1	–					
2023	Kagoshima United FC	J3 League	29	2	1	0	–					
2024	Kagoshima United FC	J2 League	22	0	1	0	1	0				
2025	ReinMeer Aomori	Japan Football League	8	0	2	0	0	0				
Total			289	19	19	2	3	0	2	0	318	21

^{1}Includes J1 Promotion Playoffs.
