= Takehiro Tomiyasu =

Japanese footballer (born 1998)

- Tomiyasu with Ajax in 2026

Personal information
- Full name: Takehiro Tomiyasu
- Date of birth: 5 November 1998 (age 28)
- Place of birth: Fukuoka, Japan
- Height: 1.87 m (6 ft 2 in)
- Positions: Centre-back; full-back

Team information
- Current team: Crystal Palace
- Number: 17

Youth career
- 2005–2011: Sanchiku Kickers
- 2009–2011: FCB Escola Fukuoka
- 2011–2014: Avispa Fukuoka

Senior career*
Years	Team	Apps	(Gls)
2015–2017	Avispa Fukuoka	45	(1)
2018–2019	Sint-Truiden	27	(1)
2019–2021	Bologna	61	(3)
2021–2025	Arsenal	65	(2)
2025–2026	Ajax	7	(0)
2026–	Crystal Palace	3	(0)

International career^{‡}
2014–2015	Japan U16	19	(0)
2015–2017	Japan U20	28	(1)
2017–2021	Japan Olympic	10	(0)
2018–	Japan	46	(1)
Medal record
Representing Japan
AFC Asian Cup
Runner-up	2019 United Arab Emirates
AFC U-19 Championship
Winner	2016 Bahrain
- * Club domestic league appearances and goals as of 16:00, 20 September 2026 (UTC) ‡ National team caps and goals as of 15:57, 30 June 2026 (UTC)

Takehiro Tomiyasu (冨安 健洋, Tomiyasu Takehiro; born 5 November 1998) is a Japanese professional footballer who plays as a centre-back or full-back for Premier League club Crystal Palace and the Japan national team.

Beginning his career at Avispa Fukuoka, Tomiyasu had a spell with Belgian club Sint-Truiden and Italian club Bologna before joining Arsenal in 2021 for a reported fee of up to £17m. After terminating his Arsenal contract by mutual agreement in 2025, Tomiyasu spent one season with Ajax before returning to the Premier League with Crystal Palace.

Having previously played for various youth levels, Tomiyasu received a call-up for Japan's senior team in 2018. He featured for the side that reached the final of the 2019 AFC Asian Cup, and also played at the 2022 FIFA World Cup, 2023 Asian Cup and 2026 World Cup.

== Club career ==
=== Avispa Fukuoka ===
Born in Fukuoka, Japan, Tomiyasu enrolled at Sanchiku Elementary School, and during the second half of his first grade, he joined the school’s football club, Sanchiku Kickers, where he initially played as a defensive midfielder. He was scouted by the club’s general manager, Kanji Tsuji, who was impressed by his performance, particularly his speed, and encouraged his parents to support his football development.

In 2009, when he was eleven years old and in the fifth grade, Tomiyasu began attending the newly established FC Barcelona Academy in Fukuoka, training there twice a week. At the academy, he played as a defensive midfielder. Although there were discussions about the possibility of joining FC Barcelona’s youth setup in Spain, the move did not materialize.

After graduating from elementary school at the age of 12, Tomiyasu passed the selection trial and joined the local club Avispa Fukuoka’s junior youth team. By the age of 14, he was playing for their U-15 side and was also selected for the Japan national youth team. Initially playing in the midfield position, he switched to centre back. During his time at Avispa Fukuoka's youth system, Tomiyasu had a period as the club captain. He impressed at the 2013's JFA Premier Cup, and was named in the Best Eleven as a result. In May 2015, it was announced that Avispa Fukuoka had registered Tomiyasu. He made his debut for the club on 14 October 2015 as a starter in a 2–0 loss against Machida Zelvia in the third round of the Emperor's Cup. At the end of the 2015 season, Tomiyasu signed a temporary contract with Avispa Fukuoka.

At the start of the 2016 season, Tomiyasu spent the first half of the J League season on the substitute bench. he made his first appearance of the season on 20 April 2016, as a starter in the defensive midfield position, in a 0–0 draw against Vegalta Sendai in the J League Cup. However, in the J. League Cup match against Sagan Tosu, Tomiyasu was sent off for a second bookable offence in a 1–1 draw. Two months later, on 13 July 2016, he made his league debut for the club, starting in the defensive midfield position in a 2–1 win against FC Tokyo. After making his debut for the club, Tomiyasu became a regular for the side, usually playing in the defensive midfield position. It was reported on 26 September 2016 that he had become the second player in the league to be the fastest player at 12.436 km in. Following the club's relegation to J. League 2, Tomiyasu went on to make sixteen appearances in all competitions. At the end of the 2016 season, he had his contract with the club renewed.

In the 2017 season, Tomiyasu became a regular for the side, playing at centre back. He then scored his first goal for the club, in a 2–1 win against Roasso Kumamoto on 19 March 2017. However, Tomiyasu faced two separate international commitment between March and May. Despite this, he continued to regain his first-team place for the club for the rest of the season. Tomiyasu then helped Avispa Fukuoka three clean sheets in three matches between 29 July 2017 and 11 August 2017. He later helped the club qualify for the J1 League Promotion Playoffs, having finished fourth place in the league. Tomiyasu helped the side beat Tokyo Verdy 1–0 to reach the semi–finals of the J1 League Promotion Playoffs. In the final of the J1 League Promotion Playoffs against Nagoya Grampus, Tomiyasu played 90 minutes, as they drew 0–0 but saw Avispa Fukuoka unsuccessfully promoted to J. League One. At the end of the 2017 season, he went on to make thirty–nine appearances and scoring once in all competitions.

=== Sint-Truidense ===
It was announced on 8 January 2018 that Tomiyasu would be moving abroad for the first time in his career by joining Belgian First Division A side Sint-Truiden. He signed a three-and-a-half-year contract with the club, keeping him until 2021. Upon joining the club, Tomiyasu said: "I want to become a special player in Belgium." After spending months at training and recovering from an ankle injury, Tomiyasu made his Sint-Truiden debut for the club, coming on as a late substitute, in a 2–1 win against Royal Antwerp on 12 May 2018. This turned out to be his only appearance of the 2017–18 season.

In the 2018–19 season, Tomiyasu made his first start for Sint-Truiden and played the entirety of a 0–0 draw against Cercle Brugge in the opening game of the season. Since the start of the season, he became a regular for the side, playing at centre back. Between 23 September 2018 and 30 September 2018, Tomiyasu kept three consecutive clean sheets in three matches. Tomiyasu scored his first goal of the season on 25 November 2018 in a 4–2 win against Anderlecht. After spending January on international duty with Japan, Tomiyasu returned to Sint-Truidense on 9 February 2019, starting and playing the full 90 minutes in a 2–1 win against Waasland-Beveren. He continued to retain his place in the team for the rest of the 2018–19 season. His performance received praise from the Belgian media. As a result, he won the club's Player of the Year. In his second season at Sint-Truidense, Tomiyasu made 40 appearances and scored once in all competitions.

=== Bologna ===
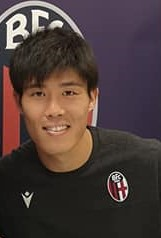
Tomiyasu in 2020 with Bologna.

It was reported on 29 June 2019 that Bologna agreed a €9 million deal to sign Tomiyasu. The transfer move was confirmed on 9 July 2019 and Tomiyasu became the second Japanese player to join the club after Hidetoshi Nakata. Upon joining the club, he said: "Impression that the defensive tactics are detailed. The striker level is also very high. I chose this team because I wanted to learn individual defense tactics. First I wanted to be on the pitch."

Tomiyasu made his Bologna debut, playing the whole game, in a 3–0 win against Pisa in the first round of the Coppa Italia. A week later, he made his league debut, playing the full 90 minutes of a 1–1 draw against Hellas Verona, and was named Man of the Match for his performance. Having made three appearances, he was named August's Player of the Month. He started in the first league seven matches before suffering a hamstring injury in October that kept him out for a month. On 24 November, he made his return to the starting line-up in a 2–2 draw against Parma. Since joining the club, Tomiyasu quickly established himself in the starting line-up playing at right back, and his performances impressed the Italian media and supporters alike. By the time the season was suspended because of the COVID-19 pandemic, he had made 20 appearances in all competitions. Tomiyasu remained an integral part of the club once the season resumed behind closed doors. He scored his first goal for Bologna in the 44th minute with his left foot, in a 5–1 loss against Milan on 18 July 2020. In a follow–up match against Atalanta, Tomiyasu suffered a hamstring injury and was substituted in the 74th minute, as the club loss 1–0. After the match, it was announced that he would be sidelined for the rest of the 2019–20 season. Despite this, Tomiyasu finished his first season at Bologna, making 30 appearances and scoring once in all competitions.

Ahead of the 2020–21 season, Tomiyasu's performances last season led to suggestions that he could be playing in the centre–back position. Tomiyasu soon recovered from his injury and regained his first-team place, playing at centre back. In a match against Sassuolo on 18 October 2020, he scored an own goal after a cross from Giorgos Kyriakopoulos, leading to the winning goal for the opposition team. In December, Tomiyasu began playing at right back for the rest of the season, though he occasionally played as a left back and centre back. This was due to his struggles playing at centre back, resulting in criticism by the Italian media. His performances began to improve as a result of the tactical change. Tomiyasu scored his first goal of the season in a 2–2 draw against Atalanta on 23 December. Two weeks later on 6 January 2021, he scored his second goal of the season, scoring from a header, in a 2–2 draw against Udinese. However, Tomiyasu suffered a calf injury that saw him out for two weeks. He made his return to the starting line–up two weeks later than expected on 14 March against Sampdoria, starting in a 3–1 win. His return was short–lived when he suffered a muscular problem against Inter Milan on 4 April. After being sidelined for a month, he made his return to the starting line–up on 2 May against Fiorentina and played 76 minutes before being substituted, in a 3–3 draw. By the end of the season, he had made 33 appearances and scoring two times in all competitions.

Ahead of the 2021–22 season, Tomiyasu was linked with a move to Premier League club Tottenham Hotspur and Atalanta. Amid the transfer speculation, he made his only appearance of the season against Atalanta, coming on as an 81st-minute substitute, in a 0–0 draw on 28 August 2021.

=== Arsenal ===
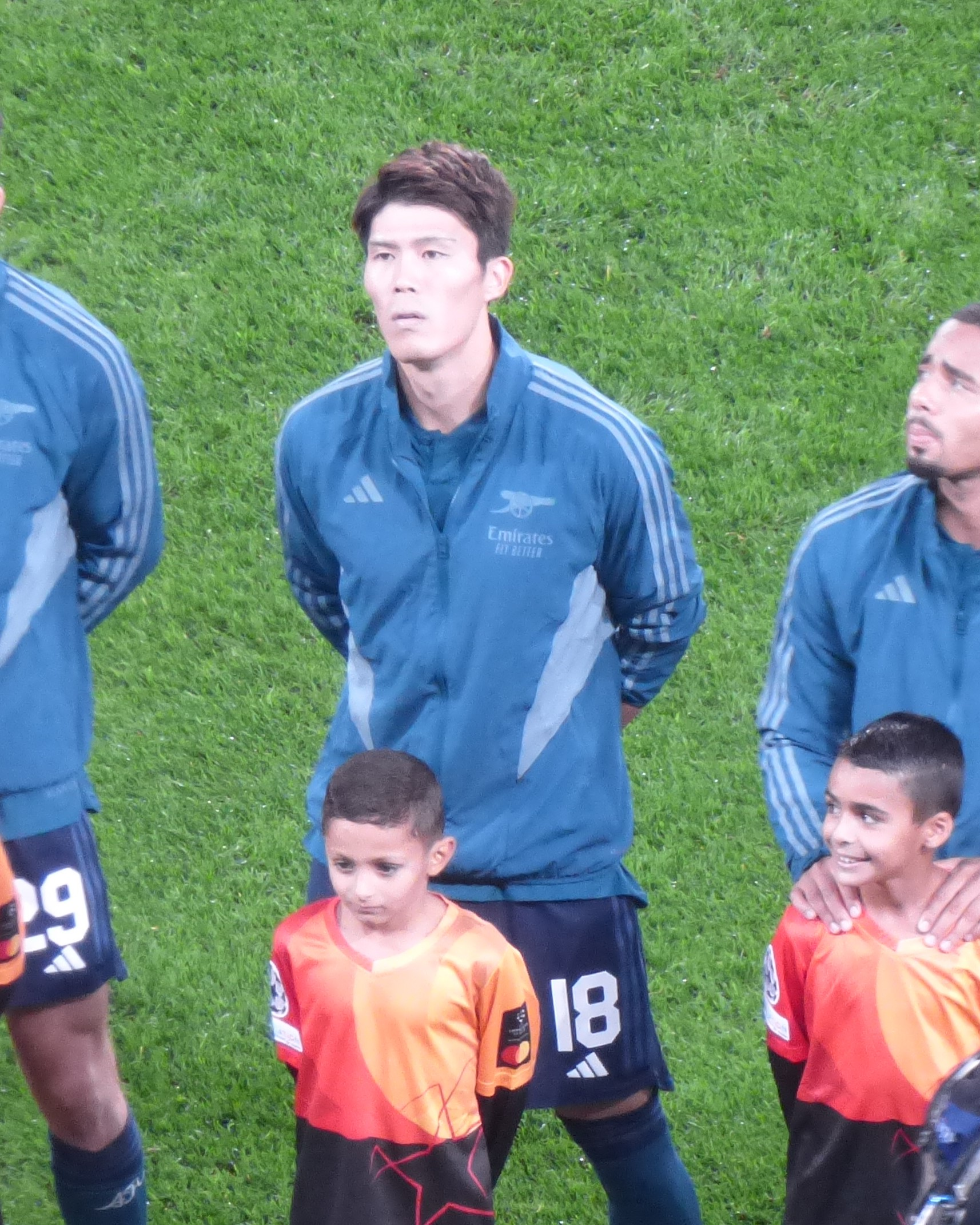
Takehiro Tomiyasu in 2023 with Arsenal.

On 31 August 2021, Tomiyasu joined Premier League club Arsenal on a four-year deal, with an option for a fifth. The transfer was variously reported as £15.5 million, £16 million and £17 million. Upon joining the club, both manager Mikel Arteta and technical director Edu commented about the player, describing him as an "important member of the squad" at Arsenal. He became the fourth Japanese player to sign for the club after Junichi Inamoto and Ryo Miyaichi; others such as Takuma Asano never featured in a competitive senior fixture for Arsenal.

On 11 September, he made his first appearance for Arsenal against Norwich City in a 1–0 win. After the match, Tomiyasu's debut performance at the club was praised by manager Arteta and local newspaper, Football London. He was named the Arsenal's Player of the Month for September 2021, with 51% of the vote. Since joining Arsenal, Tomiyasu became the club's first choice right–back position over from fellow right–back Cédric Soares. He quickly also became a fan favourite among Arsenal supporters. Following a 2–0 win against Leicester City on 30 October, manager Arteta praised his impact to the team and his settling to the country. During a 4–1 win against Leeds United on 18 December, Tomiyasu suffered a muscle injury and was substituted in the 64th minute. After missing one match, he returned from injury, starting a match, in a 2–1 loss against Manchester City on 1 January 2022. After the match, Football London, once again, praised Tomiyasu's performance on his return. However, his return was short–lived when he suffered two separate injuries that saw him out until April. He made his return from injury, coming on as a late substitute, in a 3–1 win against Manchester United on 23 April. Following this, Tomiyasu was able to make three starts in the next three matches. However during a 2–0 loss against Newcastle United on 16 May, he suffered a hamstring injury and was substituted in the 39th minute. At the end of the 2021–22 season, Tomiyasu made 22 appearances in all competitions.

At the start of the 2022–23 season, Tomiyasu lost his place in the right–back to Ben White when William Saliba returned on loan. He made his first start of the season, in a 2–1 win against FC Zürich in the UEFA Europa League match on 8 September. Following the injury of Oleksandr Zinchenko, Tomiyasu started in the left–back position against Liverpool and helped Arsenal win 3–2. He started in the next three matches, playing in the left–back position for the club. However, Tomiyasu suffered a muscle injury, having came on as 73rd-minute substitute and came off 15 minutes later, in a 1–0 win against FC Zürich on 3 November. Following the World Cup, he found himself behind pecking the order, with White and Zinchenko preferred as Arsenal's first–choice full–backs.

In a match against Manchester United on 22 January 2023, Tomiyasu came on as a second–half substitute and played a role when he set up a goal for Bukayo Saka to take a 2–1 lead, as the club won 3–2. Three week later on 15 February 2023 against Manchester City, Tomiyasu started the match and was at fault when he made a "poor backpass allowed Kevin de Bruyne to loft a finish over Aaron Ramsdale after 24 minutes", as Arsenal loss 3–1. After the match, London Evening Standard and Football London both described his performance as "poor". However, he sustained a knee injury and was substituted in the 9th minute during Arsenal's loss against Sporting CP in the second leg of the UEFA Europa League last 16. After the match, it was announced that Tomiyasu was out for the rest of the 2022–23 season. At the end of the 2022–23 season, he made 31 appearances in all competitions.

Ahead of the 2023–24 season, Tomiyasu spent Arsenal's remainder pre–season friendly tour recuperating. He made his first appearance since returning from injury, coming on as a 50th-minute substitute, in a 2–1 win against Nottingham Forest in the first game of the season. However on 21 August 2023, Tomiyasu made his first start of the 2023–24 season, in Arsenal's 1–0 win at Crystal Palace, where he was controversially sent off in the 67th minute for two bookable offences. Following his return from suspension, Tomiyasu continued to rotate playing in either left–back or right–back position. On 27 September, Tomiyasu was finally used as a centre back for Arsenal in the 2023–24 EFL Cup third round match against Brentford and contributed to a 1–0 clean sheet victory.

A week later on 8 October against Manchester City, he came on as a 75th-minute substitute, and was involved in a goal that led to Gabriel Martinelli to score the only goal of the game. Three weeks later on 28 October, Tomiyasu scored his first goal for the club in the 96th minute of stoppage time in a 5–0 victory over Sheffield United. After the match, he dedicated his goal to his mother, who died the previous year. On 2 November, Tomiyasu was selected as the team's monthly MVP for October by fan voting, making it his second award since September 2021. He then set up three goals in two consecutive matches between 29 November and 2 December, including assisting twice, in a 6–0 win against RC Lens. However, Tomiyasu played once between December and March, due to suffering from two separate calf injuries and international commitment.

On 20 March 2024, Tomiyasu extended his contract with the club until 2026. Eleven days later on 31 March, he made his return from injury, coming on as a 66th-minute substitute, in a 0–0 draw against Manchester City. Following his return from injury, Tomiyasu soon regained his first team place, playing in the left–back position for the remainder of the season. In the last game of the season against Everton, he scored an equalising goal, just two minutes before half–time, "with a fine low finish from the edge of the area following a pull-back from Martin Ødegaard ", in a 2–1 win; which saw Arsenal finish second in the league again behind Manchester City. At the end of the 2023–24 season, Tomiyasu made 29 appearances and scoring 2 times in all competitions.

The start of the 2024–25 season saw Tomiyasu out with a knee injury, which he sustained during Arsenal's pre–season tour. As a result of his ongoing injury issues, with a further operation required in February 2025, Arsenal and Tomiyasu mutually agreed to terminate his contract in July 2025.

=== Ajax ===
On 16 December 2025, Ajax announced that it has reached an agreement with Tomiyasu on his move to Amsterdam. This signing makes him only the second Japanese player in the club history, the other being Ko Itakura. The free-agent defender signed a contract for half a season, running until the end of 2025−26 season.

=== Crystal Palace ===
On 7 August 2026, following the expiry of his Ajax contract, Tomiyasu joined Premier League club Crystal Palace.

== International career ==
=== Youth ===
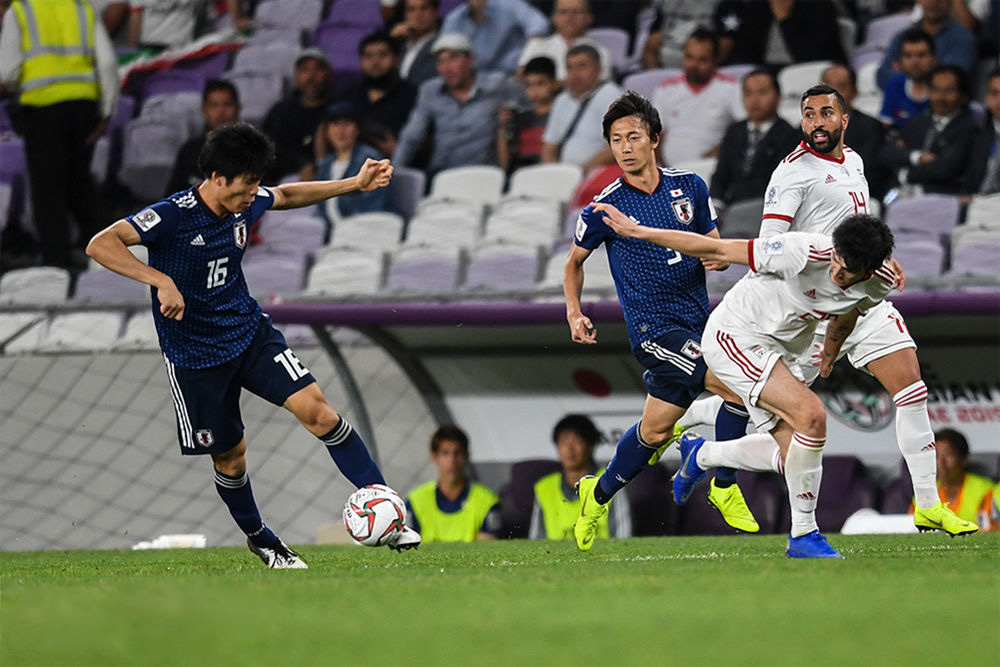
Tomiyasu attempts to clear the ball during the semi–finals of the AFC Asian Cup against Iran.

Having previously played for Japan U14 and Japan U15, Tomiyasu was called up to the Japan U16 for the first time in March 2013 ahead of the Montaigu Tournament. He participated in the tournament, as the U16 side finished seventh place. In August 2014, Tomiyasu was called for Japan U16 ahead of the AFC U-16 Championship in Thailand. He made two appearances in the tournament, as Japan U16 were eliminated in the quarter–finals.

In July 2014, Tomiyasu was called up to the Japan U17 for the first time. He participated in a number of matches for the side throughout 2015.

In June 2015, Tomiyasu was called up to the Japan U18 squad for the Panda Cup. He played two times in the tournament, as the U18 side won the trophy, finishing first place. In March 2016, Tomiyasu was called up to the Japan U-19 squad for the first time. Six months later, he was called up for the second time by the Japan U19 squad ahead of the AFC U-19 Championship in Bahrain. Tomiyasu played his first match of the tournament, where he helped the U19 side win 3–0 against Yemen U19. Tomiyasu scored his first goal of the tournament, in a 3–0 win against Qatar U19 on 20 October 2016. He helped the Japan U19 reached the final after beating Vietnam in the semi–final. Tomiyasu started in the final against Saudi Arabia U19 and played 120 minutes; which resulting Japan U19 won 5–3 on penalties. During the AFC U-19 Championship tournament, he helped the Japan U19 side keep all six clean sheets.

In May 2017, Tomiyasu was elected Japan U-20 national team for 2017 U-20 World Cup in South Korea. He made his Japan U20 debut, starting the whole game, in a 3–2 win against Honduras U-20 in a friendly match. At this tournament, he played full time in all 4 matches as centre back, as the U-20 side were eliminated in the quarter–finals by Venezuela U20.

In May 2018, Tomiyasu was called up to the Japan U21 for the first time ahead of the Toulon Tournament. He went on to make four appearances for the side, as they were eliminated in the Group stage.

In June 2021, Tomiyasu was named in the Japan squad for his first Olympic tournament, this time on home soil. He previously expressed his interest in playing at the tournament. Prior to the start of the Olympics, Tomiyasu was featured three out of the four friendly matches for the national side. Along the way, he suffered ankle injury, but it did not affect his chances to be in the Olympics squad. Tomiyasu made his debut in the tournament against France Olympic team on 28 July 2021 and started the whole game to help Japan win 4–0. He made two more appearances for the Olympics team, including a 2–0 loss against Mexico Olympic team in the bronze medal match.

=== Senior ===
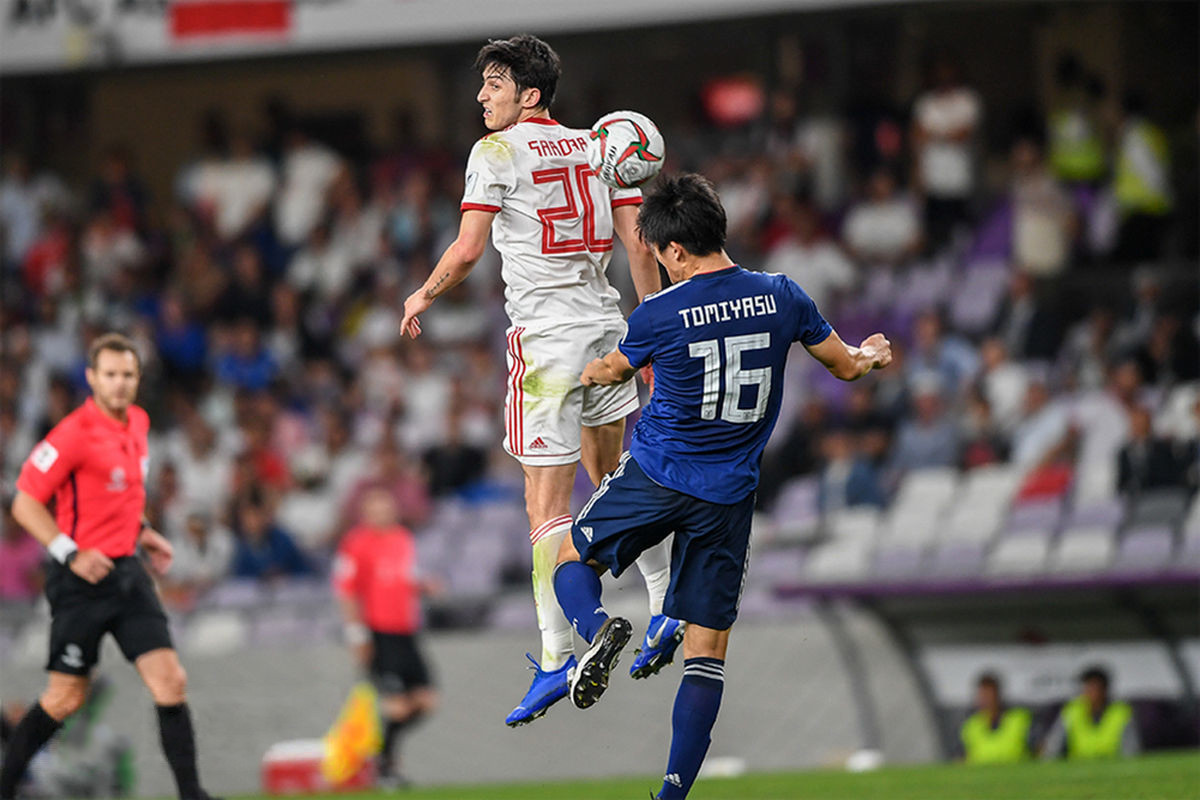
Tomiyasu headed the ball away from Sardar Azmoun during the semi–finals of the AFC Asian Cup against Iran.

On 30 August 2018, Tomiyasu received his first international call-up from the Japan national team for the Kirin Challenge Cup 2018. It was not until 12 October 2018 when he made his Samurai Blue debut, starting the whole game, in a 3–0 win against Panama. Tomiyasu became the first teenager to start in the senior team since Ryo Miyaichi. A month later on 16 November 2018, he made his second appearance for Japan, in a 1–1 draw against Venezuela.

In December 2018, Tomiyasu was re-called to the Japanese squad for the 2019 AFC Asian Cup. He made his tournament debut for the Samurai Blue, starting the whole game and helped Japan win 3–2 against Turkmenistan. He helped Samurai Blue keep a clean sheet by beating Oman 1–0 win to advance to the knockout stage. He then scored his first goal for Japan, scoring from a header, in a 1–0 win against Saudi Arabia to reach the semi–finals. Tomiyasu later played two more matches of the tournament, which saw the Samurai Blue reaching the final for the first time since 2011. In the AFC Asian Cup final against Qatar, he started and captained Japan, as the Samurai Blue loss 3–1, finishing as runner–up in the process.

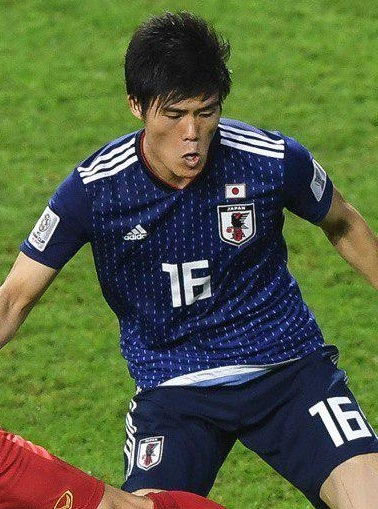
Tomiyasu playing for Japan at the 2019 AFC Asian Cup

Following the conclusion to the AFC Asian Cup tournament, Tomiyasu was called up to the Japan squad ahead of the Copa América in Brazil. He started all three matches, playing in the centre–back position, as the Samurai Blue were eliminated in the Group stage. He later played three matches of 2019, helping Japan keep three clean sheets.

Almost a year absent, Tomiyasu was called up to the Samurai Blue squad on 6 October 2020. He started three out of the four matches for Japan by the end of the year. Tomiyasu made five starts for the Samurai Blue between 7 September 2021 and 16 November 2021, where he formed a partnership with Maya Yoshida. After a year absent, Tomiyasu was called up to the Japan squad on 15 September 2022. He was able to make his first appearance for the Samurai Blue in a year, starting the match, in a 2–0 win against United States on 23 September 2022. In November 2022, Tomiyasu was called up to the 26-man Japan squad that would compete in Qatar for the 2022 FIFA World Cup. He made his World Cup debut, coming on as a second–half substitute, in the Samurai Blue's 2–1 win over Germany. Tomiyasu came on as a 71st-minute substitute when he helped Japan beat Spain win 2–1 to help his country reached the knockout phase. Tomiyasu made his first start in the centre–back position, forming a partnership with Yoshida, against Croatia in the last-16 of the World Cup, as the match eventually ended 1–1 with the Samurai Blue crashing out after their defeat on penalties.

Following the World Cup, Tomiyasu didn't receive a call–up from Japan until on 31 August 2023. On 9 September 2023, in a friendly match against Germany, which was his first international match following the World Cup, he displayed solid defence in a 4–1 away victory, in which he was awarded player of the match. On 1 January 2024, Tomiyasu was called up to the Japan's squad for the AFC Asian Cup in Qatar. He played four times and helped the Samurai Blues progress all the way to the quarter–finals, where Japan was eliminated by Iran.

On 15 May 2026, Tomiyasu was selected in the 26-man squad for the 2026 FIFA World Cup.

== Style of play ==
Playing at either centre back or right back, Tomiyasu is known for being physical, as well as his strong defending structure. He's also known for his versatility, capably filling in at left back due to his two-footedness.

His performance at Sint-Truiden was so impressive that Voetbal Nieuws named him "The Best Eleven of Foreign Players Who Have Left from the Jupiler League". Former teammate Pol García praised Tomiyasu for his attitude, while former Italy international defender Cristian Zaccardo praised his strong and energetic performances. Bologna's technical coach Emilio De Leo said about Tomiyasu's performances, saying: "He has the ability to read and manipulate time and space in a modern way." The club manager Marco Di Vaio agreed, saying: "Tomiyasu immediately impressed us because he is very good with his feet and knows how to adapt to all defense roles." National Italian newspaper Corriere dello Sport praised Tomiyasu's performance, saying: "He is a treasure. The key to reinforcing Bologna".

Manuel Minguzzi, a reporter for Tuttobologna, said about his performance: "Fans can always expect maximum professionalism and commitment from Tomiyasu. As a full back he did very well, while as a central he made some mistakes, but in Serie A it is quite normal because adaptation is needed. Tomiyasu also possesses great qualities when building the game. I was very struck by the fact that in the first year of Serie A he immediately became the protagonist. He had been taken as a center back but was often used at full back offering both phases of play. As soon as he arrived he became an idol. The Japanese market is always very active on social networks and Bologna has expanded its popularity thanks to Tomiyasu." Former Japan manager Alberto Zaccheroni praised manager Siniša Mihajlović for using Tomiyasu regularly in the first team, saying: "He was good but not malicious, Mihajlovic did a great job making him play a full back year, in less risky areas, and then use him as a central player after gaining experience."

Reflecting on his first season at Arsenal, Football London said about Tomiyasu: "Defensively immaculate and technically excellent he instantly transformed the right back position from one of weakness into one of strength."

== Personal life ==
Tomiyasu has two sisters. He was planning to follow in his sisters' footsteps by becoming a professional swimmer before switching to football instead, stating that he wanted to be a footballer. In his first press conference in Bologna, Tomiyasu said he began to learn Italian and asked the media to call him Tomi. By February 2020, Italian media Corriere Di Bologna reported that Tomiyasu already spoke Italian. In addition to Italian and his native Japanese, Tomiyasu also speaks English, having sharpened his English skills during his spell in Sint-Truiden.

Tomiyasu revealed that growing up, he idolised Javier Mascherano. In the wake of the COVID-19 pandemic in Italy, Tomiyasu spoke out about his life during the pandemic and while the season was suspended, he exercised daily. On 12 May 2020, his former club, Avispa Fukuoka expressed their gratitude to Tomiyasu after he donated 1,000 masks to the club's academy. The following month, Bologna revealed that Tomiyasu were among the players and staff members agreed to give up a month's salary.

On 27 December 2021, he tested positive for COVID-19 amid the pandemic in the United Kingdom. Tomiyasu also wears contact lenses on the pitch.

== Career statistics ==
=== Club ===
As of match played 20 September 2026

Appearances and goals by club, season and competition
Club	Season	League			National cup (Note: Includes Emperor's Cup, Belgian Cup, Coppa Italia, FA Cup)		League cup (Note: Includes J.League Cup, EFL Cup)		Continental		Other		Total	
Club	Season	Division	Apps	Goals	Apps	Goals	Apps	Goals	Apps	Goals	Apps	Goals	Apps	Goals
Avispa Fukuoka	2015	J2 League	0	0	1	0	—		—		—		1	0
Avispa Fukuoka	2016	J1 League	10	0	1	0	5	0	—		—		16	0
Avispa Fukuoka	2017	J2 League	35	1	2	0	—		—		—		37	1
Avispa Fukuoka	Total		45	1	4	0	5	0	—		—		54	1
Sint-Truiden	2017–18	Belgian Pro League	0	0	0	0	—		—		1 (Note: Appearance(s) in Belgian Pro League European play-offs)	0	1	0
Sint-Truiden	2018–19	Belgian Pro League	27	1	3	0	—		—		10	0	40	1
Sint-Truiden	Total		27	1	3	0	—		—		11	0	41	1
Bologna	2019–20	Serie A	29	1	1	0	—		—		—		30	1
Bologna	2020–21	Serie A	31	2	2	0	—		—		—		33	2
Bologna	2021–22	Serie A	1	0	0	0	—		—		—		1	0
Bologna	Total		61	3	3	0	—		—		—		64	3
Arsenal	2021–22	Premier League	21	0	0	0	1	0	—		—		22	0
Arsenal	2022–23	Premier League	21	0	2	0	0	0	8 (Note: Appearances in UEFA Europa League)	0	—		31	0
Arsenal	2023–24	Premier League	22	2	0	0	2	0	6 (Note: Appearances in UEFA Champions League)	0	0	0	30	2
Arsenal	2024–25	Premier League	1	0	0	0	0	0	0	0	—		1	0
Arsenal	Total		65	2	2	0	3	0	14	0	0	0	84	2
Ajax	2025–26	Eredivisie	7	0	0	0	—		—		2 (Note: Appearances in Eredivisie European play-offs)	0	9	0
Crystal Palace	2026–27	Premier League	3	0	0	0	0	0	0	0	—		3	0
Career total			208	7	12	0	8	0	14	0	13	0	255	7

=== International ===
As of match played 29 June 2026

Appearances and goals by national team and year
National team	Year	Apps	Goals
Japan	2018	2	0
Japan	2019	16	1
Japan	2020	3	0
Japan	2021	7	0
Japan	2022	4	0
Japan	2023	5	0
Japan	2024	5	0
Japan	2026	4	0
Total		46	1

Scores and results list Japan's goal tally first, score column indicates score after each Tomiyasu goal.

List of international goals scored by Takehiro Tomiyasu
No.	Date	Venue	Opponent	Score	Result	Competition	Ref.
1	21 January 2019	Sharjah Stadium, Sharjah, United Arab Emirates	Saudi Arabia	1–0	1–0	2019 AFC Asian Cup	

== Honours ==
Arsenal

- FA Community Shield: 2023

Japan U19

- AFC U-19 Championship: 2016

Japan

- AFC Asian Cup runner-up: 2019

Individual

- IFFHS Asian Men's Team of the Year: 2020, 2021, 2023
- IFFHS AFC Men's Team of the Decade: 2011–2020
- JPFA Awards Best XI: 2022, 2023, 2024
