= Wakaba Shimoguchi =

Japanese footballer

Wakaba Shimoguchi 下口 稚葉
Personal information
- Full name: Wakaba Shimoguchi
- Date of birth: 2 May 1998 (age 28)
- Place of birth: Fukui, Japan
- Height: 1.78 m (5 ft 10 in)
- Position: Centre-back

Team information
- Current team: Shonan Bellmare
- Number: 13

Youth career
- 2011–2016: JFA Academy Fukushima

Senior career*
| Years | Team | Apps | (Gls) |
| 2017–2024 | Fagiano Okayama | 47 | (1) |
| 2019 | → Nagano Parceiro (loan) | 8 | (1) |
| 2022–2024 | → FC Imabari (loan) | 49 | (2) |
| 2024–2025 | RB Omiya Ardija | 65 | (2) |
| 2026– | Shonan Bellmare | 18 | (0) |
- * Club domestic league appearances and goals as of 14 August 2026

Wakaba Shimoguchi (下口 稚葉, Shimoguchi Wakaba; born 2 May 1998) is a Japanese professional footballer who plays as a centre-back for J2 League club Shonan Bellmare.

== Career ==
Wakaba Shimoguchi joined J2 League club Fagiano Okayama in 2017. On 12 July, he debuted in Emperor's Cup against AC Nagano Parceiro.

== Career statistics ==
As of 1 April 2026

Appearances and goals by club, season and competition
| Club | Season | League | | | Emperor's Cup | | J.League Cup | | Other | | Total | |
| Club | Season | Division | Apps | Goals | Apps | Goals | Apps | Goals | Apps | Goals | Apps | Goals |
|---|---|---|---|---|---|---|---|---|---|---|---|---|
| Fagiano Okayama | 2017 | J2 League | 0 | 0 | 2 | 0 | 0 | 0 | — | | 2 | 0 |
| Fagiano Okayama | 2018 | J2 League | 12 | 0 | 1 | 0 | 0 | 0 | — | | 13 | 0 |
| Fagiano Okayama | 2019 | J2 League | 8 | 0 | 2 | 0 | 0 | 0 | — | | 10 | 0 |
| Fagiano Okayama | 2020 | J2 League | 18 | 0 | 0 | 0 | 0 | 0 | — | | 18 | 0 |
| Fagiano Okayama | 2021 | J2 League | 9 | 1 | 1 | 0 | 0 | 0 | — | | 10 | 1 |
| Fagiano Okayama | Total | | 47 | 1 | 6 | 0 | 0 | 0 | — | | 53 | 1 |
| Nagano Parceiro (loan) | 2019 | J3 League | 8 | 1 | 0 | 0 | 0 | 0 | — | | 8 | 1 |
| FC Imabari (loan) | 2022 | J3 League | 24 | 0 | 1 | 0 | — | | — | | 25 | 0 |
| FC Imabari (loan) | 2023 | J3 League | 25 | 2 | 1 | 0 | — | | — | | 26 | 2 |
| FC Imabari (loan) | Total | | 49 | 2 | 2 | 0 | — | | — | | 51 | 2 |
| RB Omiya Ardija | 2024 | J3 League | 29 | 2 | 2 | 0 | 0 | 0 | — | | 31 | 2 |
| RB Omiya Ardija | 2025 | J2 League | 36 | 0 | 1 | 0 | 0 | 0 | 1 (Note: Appearance in J1/J2 promotion play-offs) | 0 | 38 | 0 |
| RB Omiya Ardija | Total | | 65 | 2 | 3 | 0 | 0 | 0 | 1 | 0 | 69 | 2 |
| Shonan Bellmare | 2026 | J2/J3 (100) | 7 | 0 | – | | – | | – | | 7 | 0 |
| Career total | | | 176 | 6 | 11 | 0 | 0 | 0 | 1 | 0 | 188 | 6 |

== Honours ==
RB Omiya Ardija

- J3 League: 2024
