= Yusei Nakahara =

Japanese footballer (born 1993)

Yusei Nakahara 中原 優生
Personal information
- Full name: Yusei Nakahara
- Date of birth: 15 June 1993 (age 33)
- Place of birth: Akune, Kagoshima, Japan
- Height: 1.69 m (5 ft 7 in)
- Position: Midfielder

Youth career
- 2009–2011: Saga Higashi High School
- 2012–2015: National Institute of Fitness and Sports in Kanoya

Senior career*
Years	Team	Apps	(Gls)
2016–2019	Kagoshima United FC	49	(8)
- * Club domestic league appearances and goals as of 5 January 2020

Yusei Nakahara (中原 優生, Nakahara Yūsei; born 15 June 1993) is a former Japanese footballer who last played for Kagoshima United FC.

His elder brother Shuto is also a professional footballer currently playing for J2 League side Kagoshima United FC.

== Club statistics ==
Updated to 23 February 2020.

Club performance			League		Cup		Total	
Season	Club	League	Apps	Goals	Apps	Goals	Apps	Goals
Japan			League		Emperor's Cup		Total	
2016	Kagoshima United FC	J3 League	29	8	1	0	30	8
2017	Kagoshima United FC	J3 League	16	0	2	0	18	0
2018	Kagoshima United FC	J3 League	0	0	1	0	1	0
2019	Kagoshima United FC	J2 League	4	0	1	0	5	0
Career total			49	8	5	0	54	8
