= Masashi Kamekawa =

Japanese footballer (born 1993)

Masashi Kamekawa 亀川 諒史
Personal information
- Full name: Masashi Kamekawa
- Date of birth: 28 May 1993 (age 33)
- Place of birth: Minoh, Osaka, Japan
- Height: 1.76 m (5 ft 9 in)
- Position: Defender

Team information
- Current team: Renofa Yamaguchi
- Number: 18

Youth career
- 2001–2003: Minoh Nishi FC
- 2004–2008: Green Fluminense FC
- 2009–2011: Teikyo Daisan High School

Senior career*
Years	Team	Apps	(Gls)
2012–2015	Shonan Bellmare	38	(2)
2014	→ J. League U-22 (loan)	0	(0)
2015	→ Avispa Fukuoka (loan)	38	(0)
2016–2017	Avispa Fukuoka	69	(0)
2018	Kashiwa Reysol	22	(1)
2019–2021	V-Varen Nagasaki	81	(2)
2022	Yokohama FC	35	(2)
2023–2024	Avispa Fukuoka	29	(1)
2025–	Renofa Yamaguchi	20	(0)

International career
2016	Japan U-23	2	(0)
Medal record
Representing Japan
AFC U-23 Championship
Gold medal – first place	2016 Qatar
- * Club domestic league appearances and goals as of 21 August 2026

Masashi Kamekawa (亀川 諒史, Kamekawa Masashi; born 28 May 1993) is a Japanese footballer who plays as a defender for J3 League club Renofa Yamaguchi.

== Career ==
=== Shonan Bellmare ===
On 26 September 2011, Kamekawa was announced at Shonan Bellmare from the 2012 season. He struggled with injuries during the 2012 season.

=== Loan to J.League U-22 ===
On 24 February 2014, Kamekawa was registered as a member of the J.League U-22 team.

=== Second spell at Avispa Fukuoka ===
On 30 December 2015, Kamekawa was announced at Avispa Fukuoka on a permanent deal.

=== Kashiwa Reysol ===
On 6 January 2018, Kamekawa was announced at Kashiwa Reysol.

=== V-Varen Nagasaki ===
On 4 January 2019, Kamekawa was announced at V-Varen Nagasaki.

=== Yokohama FC ===
On 27 December 2021, Kamekawa was announced at Yokohama FC. He made his league debut against V-Varen Nagasaki on 27 February 2022. Kamekawa scored his first league goal against Renofa Yamaguchi on 29 May 2022, scoring in the 89th minute.

=== Third spell at Avispa Fukuoka ===
On 20 December 2022, Kamekawa was announced at Avispa Fukuoka. He made his league debut against Vissel Kobe on 18 February 2023. Kamekawa scored his first league goal against Consadole Sapporo on 10 August 2024, scoring in the 90th+6th minute.

=== Renofa Yamaguchi ===
On 29 December 2024, Kamekawa was announced at Renofa Yamaguchi.

== International career ==
On 14 November 2013, Kamekawa was selected in the Japan U20 squad for a tour of Myanmar.

On 11 December 2013, Kamekawa was selected in the Japan U22 squad for the U-22 2013 Asian Cup.

In August 2016, Kamekawa was selected in the Japan U-23 national team at the 2016 Summer Olympics. At this tournament, he played 2 matches as a left back.

== Club statistics ==
As of 27 May 2023.

Club	Season	League		Emperor's Cup		J. League Cup		AFC		Total	
Club	Season	Apps	Goals	Apps	Goals	Apps	Goals	Apps	Goals	Apps	Goals
Shonan Bellmare	2012	0	0	1	0	—		—		1	0
Shonan Bellmare	2013	20	1	2	0	5	0	—		27	1
Shonan Bellmare	2014	18	1	2	0	—		—		20	1
Avispa Fukuoka	2015	38	0	1	0	—		—		39	0
Avispa Fukuoka	2016	27	0	0	0	4	0	—		31	0
Avispa Fukuoka	2017	42	0	2	0	—		—		44	0
Kashiwa Reysol	2018	22	1	2	0	2	0	5	0	31	1
V-Varen Nagasaki	2019	40	1	3	0	0	0	—		43	1
V-Varen Nagasaki	2020	28	1	—		—		—		28	1
V-Varen Nagasaki	2021	13	0	1	0	—		—		14	0
Yokohama FC	2022	35	2	0	0	—		—		35	2
Avispa Fukuoka	2023	1	0	0	0	0	0	—		1	0
Career total		284	7	14	0	11	0	5	0	314	7
