= Akishige Kaneda =

Japanese footballer

Akishige Kaneda 兼田 亜季重
Personal information
- Full name: Akishige Kaneda
- Date of birth: February 26, 1990 (age 36)
- Place of birth: Fukuyama, Hiroshima, Japan
- Height: 1.84 m (6 ft 1/2 in)
- Position: Goalkeeper

Team information
- Current team: Oita Trinita
- Number: 23

Youth career
- –2007: Sanfrecce Hiroshima

Senior career*
Years	Team	Apps	(Gls)
2008–2013	Ehime FC	3	(0)
2014–2015	Montedio Yamagata	3	(0)
2016–2017	Avispa Fukuoka	15	(0)
2018–	Oita Trinita	0	(0)
Medal record
Montedio Yamagata
Runner-up	Emperor's Cup	2014
- * Club domestic league appearances and goals as of 16 December 2018

Akishige Kaneda (兼田 亜季重, Kaneda Akishige; born February 26, 1990) is a Japanese football player who plays for Oita Trinita in the J2 League.

== Club career ==
Born in Fukuyama, Hiroshima, Kaneda was a product of Sanfrecce Hiroshima's youth ranks where he was teammates with players like Tsubasa Yokotake and Kenta Uchida.

In 2008, Kaneda signed a professional contract with Ehime F.C. and had been coached by goalkeeper coach Akira Yamanaka, before he was then replaced by former goalkeeper Yoshimi Sasahara. Kaneda stayed for five years in Ehime and had only made a total of three appearances.

In 2014, Kaneda completed a permanent move to Montedio Yamagata where he spent two years as a substitute goalkeeper.

At the start of the 2016 season, Kaneda moved to the newly promoted Avispa Fukuoka.

In 2016, Kaneda joined Avispa Fukuoka, a newly promoted J1 League team. He mostly played as a substitute and didn't always make the bench. However, he finally made his J1 League debut in the last game of the season against Kashiwa Reysol, marking his first appearance in the league in his ninth year as a professional, even though Fukuoka's relegation back to J2 was already confirmed.

The following year, in 2017, Kaneda returned to playing in the J2 League. Mid-season, he earned a starting position from Rikihito Sugiyama and achieved a career-high of 15 official appearances. However, he reverted to a reserve role by the end of the season, and his contract with Avispa Fukuoka was not renewed.

In 2018, Kaneda moved to Oita Trinita but did not make any official or bench appearances throughout the year. At the close of the 2018 season, he was placed on the Japan Football Association's transfer list.

On December 12, 2018, Kaneda participated in the J.League joint tryout at Fukuda Denshi Arena in an effort to find a new club, but he was unsuccessful. Consequently, Oita Trinita announced Kaneda's retirement from professional football on February 15, 2019.

== Club statistics ==
Updated to 23 February 2018.

Club performance			League		Cup		League Cup		Total	
Season	Club	League	Apps	Goals	Apps	Goals	Apps	Goals	Apps	Goals
Japan			League		Emperor's Cup		J. League Cup		Total	
2008	Ehime FC	J2 League	0	0	0	0	-		0	0
2009	Ehime FC	J2 League	0	0	0	0	-		0	0
2010	Ehime FC	J2 League	0	0	0	0	-		0	0
2011	Ehime FC	J2 League	2	0	1	0	-		3	0
2012	Ehime FC	J2 League	0	0	0	0	-		0	0
2013	Ehime FC	J2 League	1	0	1	0	-		2	0
2014	Montedio Yamagata	J2 League	3	0	0	0	-		3	0
2015	Montedio Yamagata	J1 League	0	0	1	0	0	0	1	0
2016	Avispa Fukuoka	J1 League	1	0	0	0	0	0	1	0
2017	Avispa Fukuoka	J2 League	14	0	1	0	-		15	0
Total			21	0	4	0	0	0	25	0
