= Hokuto Nakamura =

Japanese footballer

Hokuto Nakamura 中村 北斗
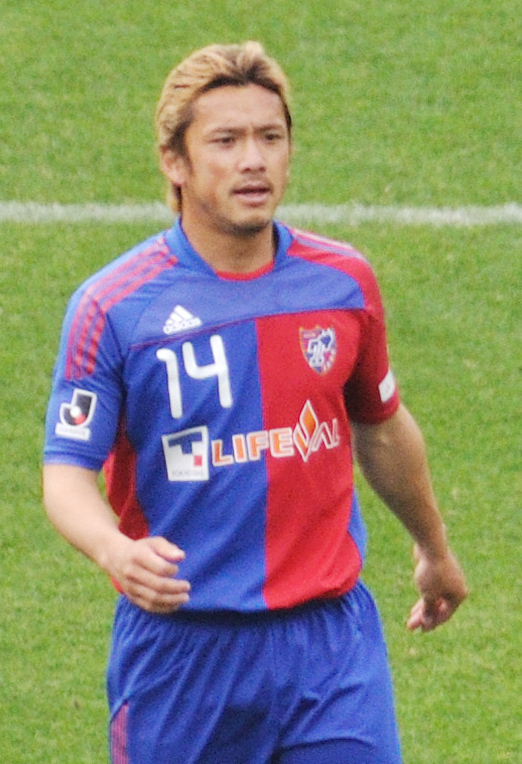

Personal information
- Full name: Hokuto Nakamura
- Date of birth: 10 July 1985 (age 41)
- Place of birth: Isahaya, Nagasaki, Japan
- Height: 1.67 m (5 ft 5 1/2 in)
- Positions: Midfielder; defender

Team information
- Current team: Avispa Fukuoka (U18 head coach)

Youth career
- 2001–2003: Kunimi High School

Senior career*
Years	Team	Apps	(Gls)
2004–2008	Avispa Fukuoka	105	(11)
2009–2013	FC Tokyo	73	(3)
2014	Omiya Ardija	20	(0)
2015–2017	Avispa Fukuoka	51	(3)
2018–2019	V-Varen Nagasaki	2	(0)

International career
2005	Japan U-20	4	(0)

Managerial career
- 2020–: Avispa Fukuoka (U18)
Medal record
FC Tokyo
Winner	J.League Cup	2009
Winner	Emperor's Cup	2011
Representing Japan
AFC U-19 Championship
Bronze medal – third place	2004 Malaysia
- * Club domestic league appearances and goals

Hokuto Nakamura (中村 北斗, Nakamura Hokuto; born 10 July 1985) is a retired Japanese football player and current U18 head coach of Avispa Fukuoka.

== National team career ==
In June 2005, Nakamura was selected Japan U-20 national team for 2005 World Youth Championship. At this tournament, he played full time in all 4 matches as right side back and right side midfielder.

== Coaching career ==
After retiring at the end of 2019, Nakamura was hired as U18 head coach of his former club, Avispa Fukuoka.

== Career statistics ==
Updated to 23 February 2017.

Appearances and goals by club, season and competition
Club	Season	League		Cup^{1}		League Cup^{2}		Other^{3}		Total	
Club	Season	Apps	Goals	Apps	Goals	Apps	Goals	Apps	Goals	Apps	Goals
Avispa Fukuoka	2004	0	0	0	0	—		—		0	0
Avispa Fukuoka	2005	34	4	0	0	—		—		34	4
Avispa Fukuoka	2006	30	4	1	0	2	0	—		33	4
Avispa Fukuoka	2007	3	0	0	0	—		—		3	0
Avispa Fukuoka	2008	38	3	1	0	—		—		39	3
Avispa Fukuoka	Total	105	11	2	0	2	0	—		109	11
FC Tokyo	2009	10	2	2	1	2	0	—		14	3
FC Tokyo	2010	28	0	2	0	8	0	1	0	39	0
FC Tokyo	2011	24	0	4	0	—		—		28	0
FC Tokyo	2012	8	1	0	0	2	0	—		10	1
FC Tokyo	2013	0	0	0	0	0	0	—		0	0
FC Tokyo	Total	70	3	8	1	12	0	1	0	91	4
Omiya Ardija	2014	20	0	1	0	2	0	—		23	0
Omiya Ardija	Total	20	0	1	0	2	0	—		23	0
Avispa Fukuoka	2015	30	3	1	0	—		2	1	33	4
Avispa Fukuoka	2016	16	0	1	0	4	0	–		21	0
Avispa Fukuoka	Total	46	3	2	0	4	0	2	1	54	4
Career total		241	17	13	1	20	0	3	1	277	19

^{1}Includes Emperor's Cup.

^{2}Includes J.League Cup.

^{3}Includes Suruga Bank Championship and J1 Promotion Playoffs.

== National team career statistics ==
=== Appearances in major competitions ===
Team	Competition	Category	Appearances		Goals	Team record
Team	Competition	Category	Start	Sub	Goals	Team record
Japan	AFC Youth Championship 2004 qualification	U-18	1	1	0	Qualified
Japan	AFC Youth Championship 2004	U-19				3rd place
Japan	2005 FIFA World Youth Championship	U-20	4	0	0	Round of 16

== Awards and honours ==
=== Club ===
FC Tokyo

- J2 League (1) : 2011
- Emperor's Cup (1) : 2011
- J.League Cup (1) : 2009
- Suruga Bank Championship (1) : 2010
