= Kim Hyun-hun =

South Korean footballer (born 1991)

Personal information
- Full name: Kim Hyun-hun
- Date of birth: 30 April 1991 (age 35)
- Place of birth: South Korea
- Height: 1.84 m (6 ft 1/2 in)
- Position: Centre back

Team information
- Current team: Gimpo FC
- Number: 28

Youth career
- 2007–2009: Gyeongnam FC
- 2010–2012: Hongik University

Senior career*
Years	Team	Apps	(Gls)
2013–2015	JEF United	101	(8)
2016	Avispa Fukuoka	29	(0)
2017	Yunnan Lijiang	29	(0)
2018–2019	Gyeongnam FC	30	(1)
2019–2020	Gyeongju Citizen	19	(0)
2021	Seoul E-Land FC	21	(1)
2022	Gwangju FC	27	(0)
2023–2024	Suwon FC	10	(0)
2023	→ Jeonnam Dragons (loan)	3	(0)
2024–	Gimpo FC	5	(0)

International career
2011–2012	South Korea U-23		
- * Club domestic league appearances and goals as of 13 January 2023

Kim Hyun-hun (Korean: 김현훈; born 30 April 1991) is a South Korean footballer who plays as centre back for Gimpo FC in K League 2. As of 2021, Hyun-hun has played 1170 minutes and has been shown 2 yellow cards.

== Club statistics ==
As of 20 August 2023.

Appearances and goals by club, season and competition
Club	Season	League			Cup		League Cup		Total	
Club	Season	Division	Apps	Goals	Apps	Goals	Apps	Goals	Apps	Goals
JEF United Chiba	2013	J2 League	26	0	1	0	–		27	0
JEF United Chiba	2014	J2 League	36	4	5	0	–		41	4
JEF United Chiba	2015	J2 League	39	4	2	0	–		41	4
JEF United Chiba	Total		101	8	8	0	0	0	109	8
Avispa Fukuoka	2016	J1 League	29	0	–		7	0	36	0
Yunnan Lijiang	2017	China League One	29	0	0	0	0	0	29	0
Gyeongnam FC	2018	K League 1	30	1	1	0	–		31	1
Gyeongju Citizen	2019	K3 League Advanced	?	?	1	0	–		?	?
Gyeongju Citizen	2020	K3 League	19	0	1	0	–		20	0
Gyeongju Citizen	Total		19	0	2	0	0	0	21	0
Seoul E-Land FC	2021	K League 2	21	1	1	0	–		22	1
Gwangju FC	2022	K League 2	27	0	0	0	–		27	0
Suwon FC	2023	K League 1	10	0	1	0	–		11	0
Jeonnam Dragons (loan)	2023	K League 2	3	0	–		–		3	0
Career total			269	10	13	0	7	0	289	10
