= 2017 Avispa Fukuoka season =

Avispa Fukuoka
2017 season
- Manager: Masami Ihara
- Stadium: Level5 Stadium
- J2 League: 4th

2017 Avispa Fukuoka season.

== J2 League ==
=== League table ===
Pos	Team	Pld	W	D	L	GF	GA	GD	Pts	Promotion, qualification or relegation
3	Nagoya Grampus (O, P)	42	23	6	13	85	65	+20	75	Qualification for promotion playoffs (Note: Only teams that meet J1 license criteria can participate in promotion playoffs. If one or more teams fail to meet the criteria, only eligible teams that finished 3rd to 6th will participate and no replacement teams will be added.)
4	Avispa Fukuoka	42	21	11	10	54	36	+18	74	Qualification for promotion playoffs
5	Tokyo Verdy	42	20	10	12	64	49	+15	70	Qualification for promotion playoffs

Updated to match(es) played on 28 November 2017. Source: 2017 MEIJI YASUDA J2 LEAGUE League table
Rules for classification: 1) Points; 2) Goal difference; 3) Goals scored
(O) Play-off winners; (P) Promoted

=== Match details ===
J2 League match details
Match	Date	Team	Score	Team	Venue	Attendance
1	2017.02.26	Avispa Fukuoka	1-2	Oita Trinita	Level5 Stadium	15,042
2	2017.03.05	Renofa Yamaguchi FC	1-2	Avispa Fukuoka	Ishin Memorial Park Stadium	9,651
3	2017.03.12	Avispa Fukuoka	2-1	Kyoto Sanga FC	Level5 Stadium	7,586
4	2017.03.19	Avispa Fukuoka	2-1	Roasso Kumamoto	Level5 Stadium	9,008
5	2017.03.26	Montedio Yamagata	0-0	Avispa Fukuoka	ND Soft Stadium Yamagata	6,110
6	2017.04.02	Avispa Fukuoka	0-0	Yokohama FC	Level5 Stadium	10,464
7	2017.04.08	Avispa Fukuoka	1-3	FC Machida Zelvia	Level5 Stadium	6,021
8	2017.04.15	V-Varen Nagasaki	0-1	Avispa Fukuoka	Transcosmos Stadium Nagasaki	5,340
9	2017.04.22	Mito HollyHock	1-1	Avispa Fukuoka	K's denki Stadium Mito	3,023
10	2017.04.29	Avispa Fukuoka	1-0	Tokyo Verdy	Level5 Stadium	8,247
11	2017.05.03	Tokushima Vortis	2-1	Avispa Fukuoka	Pocarisweat Stadium	5,832
12	2017.05.07	Matsumoto Yamaga FC	0-1	Avispa Fukuoka	Matsumotodaira Park Stadium	13,792
13	2017.05.13	Avispa Fukuoka	1-0	Fagiano Okayama	Level5 Stadium	6,223
14	2017.05.17	Shonan Bellmare	0-3	Avispa Fukuoka	Shonan BMW Stadium Hiratsuka	8,598
15	2017.05.21	Zweigen Kanazawa	0-5	Avispa Fukuoka	Ishikawa Athletics Stadium	3,454
16	2017.05.28	Avispa Fukuoka	1-3	Thespakusatsu Gunma	Level5 Stadium	8,025
17	2017.06.03	Avispa Fukuoka	3-1	Kamatamare Sanuki	Level5 Stadium	6,168
18	2017.06.10	JEF United Chiba	0-0	Avispa Fukuoka	Fukuda Denshi Arena	10,497
19	2017.06.17	Avispa Fukuoka	3-1	Nagoya Grampus	Level5 Stadium	13,281
20	2017.06.25	Ehime FC	0-1	Avispa Fukuoka	Ningineer Stadium	7,117
21	2017.07.01	Avispa Fukuoka	1-0	FC Gifu	Level5 Stadium	8,858
22	2017.07.08	Avispa Fukuoka	0-2	Zweigen Kanazawa	Level5 Stadium	7,005
23	2017.07.16	Thespakusatsu Gunma	1-3	Avispa Fukuoka	Shoda Shoyu Stadium Gunma	3,366
24	2017.07.23	Avispa Fukuoka	0-1	Tokushima Vortis	Level5 Stadium	8,063
25	2017.07.29	Avispa Fukuoka	2-0	Montedio Yamagata	Level5 Stadium	7,127
26	2017.08.05	FC Machida Zelvia	0-1	Avispa Fukuoka	Machida Stadium	3,334
27	2017.08.11	Kyoto Sanga FC	0-1	Avispa Fukuoka	Kyoto Nishikyogoku Athletic Stadium	8,523
28	2017.08.16	Avispa Fukuoka	0-1	V-Varen Nagasaki	Level5 Stadium	13,481
29	2017.08.20	Nagoya Grampus	3-1	Avispa Fukuoka	Paloma Mizuho Stadium	13,914
30	2017.08.27	Avispa Fukuoka	0-0	Mito HollyHock	Level5 Stadium	8,075
31	2017.09.02	Kamatamare Sanuki	2-2	Avispa Fukuoka	Pikara Stadium	4,557
32	2017.09.09	Avispa Fukuoka	0-1	Ehime FC	Level5 Stadium	7,194
33	2017.09.18	Roasso Kumamoto	1-1	Avispa Fukuoka	Egao Kenko Stadium	5,202
34	2017.09.24	FC Gifu	1-2	Avispa Fukuoka	Gifu Nagaragawa Stadium	7,348
35	2017.09.30	Avispa Fukuoka	2-1	Renofa Yamaguchi FC	Level5 Stadium	9,050
36	2017.10.07	Yokohama FC	1-3	Avispa Fukuoka	NHK Spring Mitsuzawa Football Stadium	8,017
37	2017.10.14	Oita Trinita	1-1	Avispa Fukuoka	Oita Bank Dome	8,767
38	2017.10.22	Avispa Fukuoka	0-1	JEF United Chiba	Level5 Stadium	10,490
39	2017.10.28	Tokyo Verdy	0-0	Avispa Fukuoka	Ajinomoto Stadium	5,410
40	2017.11.05	Avispa Fukuoka	2-1	Shonan Bellmare	Level5 Stadium	16,336
41	2017.11.11	Avispa Fukuoka	1-1	Matsumoto Yamaga FC	Level5 Stadium	14,802
42	2017.11.19	Fagiano Okayama	1-1	Avispa Fukuoka	City Light Stadium	9,894
