= Yuki Saneto =

Japanese footballer

Yuki Saneto 實藤 友紀
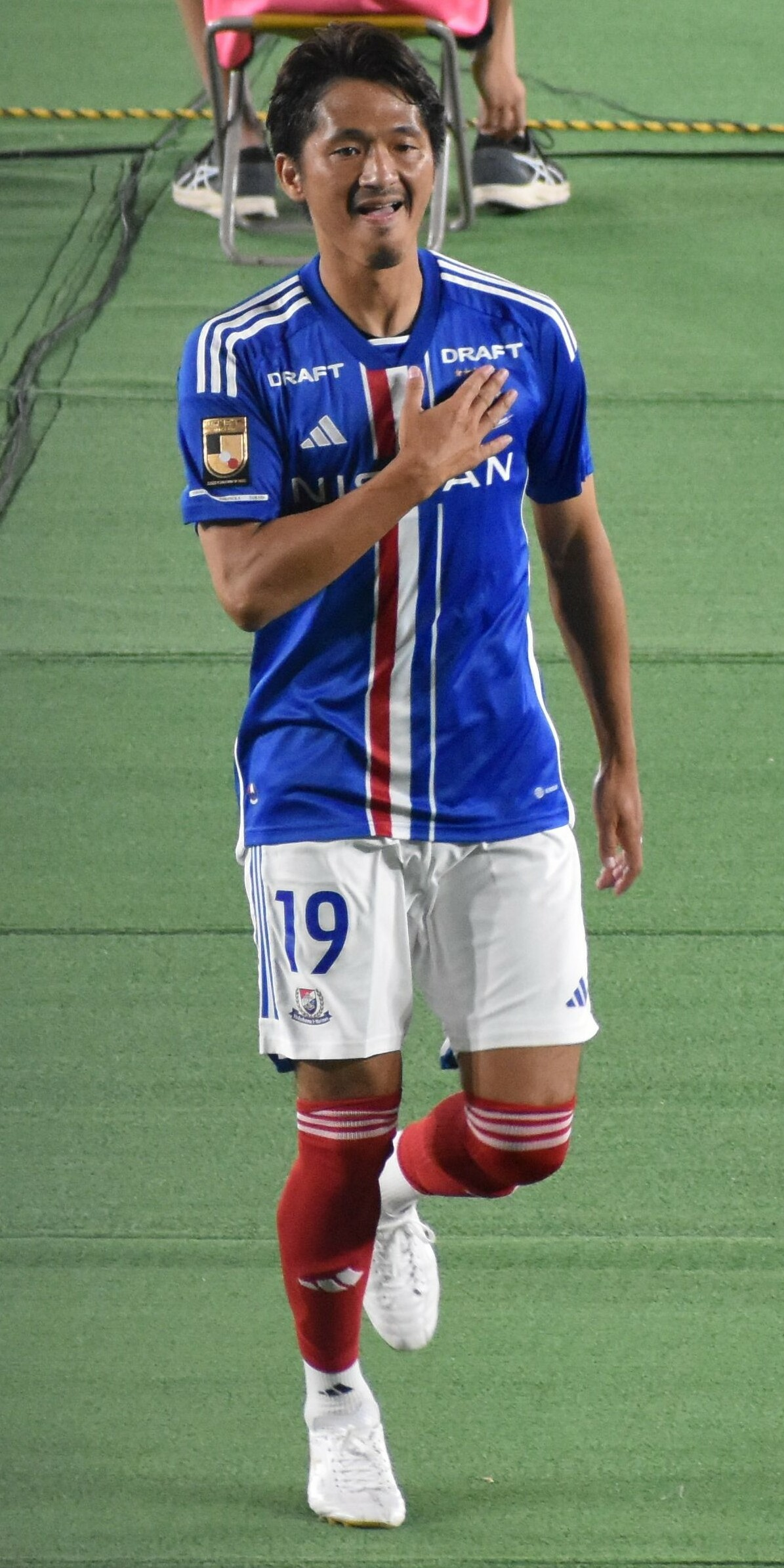

Personal information
- Full name: Yuki Saneto
- Date of birth: 19 January 1989 (age 37)
- Place of birth: Tokushima, Japan
- Height: 1.78 m (5 ft 10 in)
- Positions: Centre back; right back

Team information
- Current team: Kataller Toyama
- Number: 19

Youth career
- 1995–1998: Showa Eleven
- 1999–2000: Tokushima FC Liberrimo
- 2001–2003: Tomida Junior High School
- 2004–2006: Jonan High School

College career
| Years | Team | Apps | (Gls) |
| 2007–2010 | Kochi University | | |

Senior career*
| Years | Team | Apps | (Gls) |
| 2011–2015 | Kawasaki Frontale | 74 | (2) |
| 2016–2020 | Avispa Fukuoka | 100 | (5) |
| 2020–2024 | Yokohama F. Marinos | 24 | (3) |
| 2024–2025 | Vegalta Sendai | 9 | (0) |
| 2025– | Kataller Toyama | 15 | (1) |
Medal record
Representing Japan
Asian Games
| Gold medal – first place | 2010 Guangzhou | Team |
- * Club domestic league appearances and goals as of 16 August 2026

Yuki Saneto (實藤 友紀, Sanetō Yūki; born 19 January 1989) is a Japanese footballer who currently plays for J2 League club Kataller Toyama.

== Career ==
=== Club career ===
Saneto spent his early years playing for Kochi University. Kawasaki Frontale announced Saneto's transfer from Kochi University on 12 May 2010, marking the start of his professional career. He spent the rest of the 2010 J.League Division 1 season without playing a single minute.

In the 2011 season, Saneto appeared in a total of 13 games, 12 in the league and 1 in the J.League Cup for Kawasaki Frontale. He became a regular the next year, making a total of 32 appearances in all competitions while also scored two goals for the club. However, his playing time decreased after the 2012 season, quite significantly in the 2014 season where he only made 13 appearances for the club. Saneto missed most of the 2015 J.League 1 season, as he only played for 4 minutes throughout the whole year.

At the start of 2016, it was announced that after five-and-a-half years of playing for Kawasaki Frontale, Saneto transferred to newly promoted Avispa Fukuoka.

== Career statistics ==
As of 3 March 2025

Appearances and goals by club, season and competition
| Club | Season | League | | | National Cup | | League Cup | | Continental | | Other | | Total | |
| Club | Season | Division | Apps | Goals | Apps | Goals | Apps | Goals | Apps | Goals | Apps | Goals | Apps | Goals |
| Japan | | | League | | Emperor's Cup | | J.League Cup | | AFC | | Other | | Total | |
|---|---|---|---|---|---|---|---|---|---|---|---|---|---|---|
| Kōchi University | 2008 | – | | | 1 | 0 | – | | – | | – | | 1 | 0 |
| Kōchi University | 2008 | – | | | 2 | 1 | – | | – | | – | | 2 | 1 |
| Kōchi University | 2009 | – | | | 1 | 0 | – | | – | | – | | 1 | 0 |
| Kōchi University | Total | | 0 | 0 | 4 | 1 | 0 | 0 | 0 | 0 | 0 | 0 | 4 | 1 |
| Kawasaki Frontale | 2011 | J. League Division 1 | 12 | 0 | 0 | 0 | 1 | 0 | – | | – | | 13 | 0 |
| Kawasaki Frontale | 2012 | J. League Division 1 | 26 | 2 | 2 | 0 | 4 | 0 | – | | – | | 32 | 2 |
| Kawasaki Frontale | 2013 | J. League Division 1 | 22 | 0 | 2 | 0 | 8 | 1 | – | | – | | 32 | 1 |
| Kawasaki Frontale | 2014 | J. League Division 1 | 13 | 0 | 0 | 0 | 3 | 0 | 1 | 0 | – | | 17 | 0 |
| Kawasaki Frontale | 2015 | J1 League | 1 | 0 | 0 | 0 | 0 | 0 | – | | – | | 1 | 0 |
| Kawasaki Frontale | Total | | 74 | 2 | 4 | 0 | 16 | 1 | 1 | 0 | 0 | 0 | 95 | 3 |
| Avispa Fukuoka | 2016 | J1 League | 19 | 1 | 1 | 0 | 3 | 0 | – | | – | | 23 | 1 |
| Avispa Fukuoka | 2017 | J2 League | 21 | 1 | 0 | 0 | 0 | 0 | – | | 2 (Note: Appearances in J/J2 playoffs) | 0 | 23 | 1 |
| Avispa Fukuoka | 2018 | J2 League | 28 | 1 | 1 | 0 | – | | – | | – | | 29 | 1 |
| Avispa Fukuoka | 2019 | J2 League | 32 | 2 | 0 | 0 | – | | – | | – | | 32 | 2 |
| Avispa Fukuoka | 2020 | J2 League | 0 | 0 | 0 | 0 | – | | – | | – | | 0 | 0 |
| Avispa Fukuoka | Total | | 100 | 5 | 2 | 0 | 3 | 0 | 0 | 0 | 2 | 0 | 107 | 5 |
| Yokohama F. Marinos | 2020 | J1 League | 6 | 0 | 0 | 0 | 0 | 0 | 2 | 0 | 0 | 0 | 8 | 0 |
| Yokohama F. Marinos | 2021 | J1 League | 9 | 2 | 0 | 0 | 3 | 0 | – | | – | | 12 | 2 |
| Yokohama F. Marinos | 2022 | J1 League | 5 | 1 | 0 | 0 | 1 | 0 | 4 | 1 | – | | 12 | 2 |
| Yokohama F. Marinos | 2023 | J1 League | 3 | 0 | 2 | 0 | 5 | 0 | 0 | 0 | – | | 10 | 0 |
| Yokohama F. Marinos | 2024 | J1 League | 1 | 0 | 1 | 0 | 0 | 0 | 0 | 0 | – | | 2 | 0 |
| Yokohama F. Marinos | Total | | 24 | 3 | 3 | 0 | 9 | 0 | 6 | 1 | 0 | 0 | 44 | 4 |
| Vegalta Sendai | 2024 | J2 League | 7 | 0 | 0 | 0 | 0 | 0 | – | | – | | 7 | 0 |
| Vegalta Sendai | 2025 | J2 League | 0 | 0 | 0 | 0 | 0 | 0 | – | | – | | 0 | 0 |
| Vegalta Sendai | Total | | 7 | 0 | 0 | 0 | 0 | 0 | 0 | 0 | 0 | 0 | 7 | 0 |
| Career total | | | 205 | 10 | 13 | 1 | 28 | 1 | 7 | 1 | 2 | 0 | 257 | 13 |

== Honours ==
=== Japan ===
- Asian Games: 2010

=== Club ===
Yokohama F. Marinos

- J1 League: 2022
