= 2018 Fagiano Okayama season =

Fagiano Okayama
2018 season
- Manager: Tetsu Nagasawa
- Stadium: City Light Stadium
- J2 League: 15th

2018 Fagiano Okayama season.

== League table ==
Pos	Team	Pld	W	D	L	GF	GA	GD	Pts
13	Zweigen Kanazawa	42	14	13	15	52	48	+4	55
14	JEF United Chiba	42	16	7	19	72	72	0	55
15	Fagiano Okayama	42	14	11	17	39	43	−4	53
16	Albirex Niigata	42	15	8	19	48	56	−8	53
17	Tochigi SC	42	13	11	18	38	48	−10	50

Source: 2018 MEIJI YASUDA J2 LEAGUE League table
Rules for classification: 1) Points; 2) Goal difference; 3) Goals scored

== J2 League ==
Match	Date	Team	Score	Team	Venue	Attendance
1	2018.02.25	Tokushima Vortis	0-1	Fagiano Okayama	Pocarisweat Stadium	8,753
2	2018.03.04	Fagiano Okayama	3-0	Tochigi SC	City Light Stadium	9,291
3	2018.03.11	Fagiano Okayama	1-0	Oita Trinita	City Light Stadium	8,358
4	2018.03.17	Matsumoto Yamaga FC	1-1	Fagiano Okayama	Yamanashi Chuo Bank Stadium	9,540
5	2018.03.21	Kyoto Sanga FC	0-1	Fagiano Okayama	Kyoto Nishikyogoku Athletic Stadium	3,639
6	2018.03.25	Fagiano Okayama	1-0	Ventforet Kofu	City Light Stadium	10,278
7	2018.04.01	Fagiano Okayama	0-1	Ehime FC	City Light Stadium	9,117
8	2018.04.08	Albirex Niigata	0-1	Fagiano Okayama	Denka Big Swan Stadium	11,783
9	2018.04.14	Omiya Ardija	1-1	Fagiano Okayama	NACK5 Stadium Omiya	7,248
10	2018.04.21	Fagiano Okayama	0-0	FC Gifu	City Light Stadium	8,668
11	2018.04.28	Fagiano Okayama	3-1	Roasso Kumamoto	City Light Stadium	9,280
12	2018.05.03	JEF United Chiba	1-0	Fagiano Okayama	Fukuda Denshi Arena	10,514
13	2018.05.06	Fagiano Okayama	2-2	Avispa Fukuoka	City Light Stadium	9,021
14	2018.05.13	Mito HollyHock	3-0	Fagiano Okayama	K's denki Stadium Mito	3,502
16	2018.05.27	FC Machida Zelvia	1-3	Fagiano Okayama	Machida Stadium	4,259
17	2018.06.02	Fagiano Okayama	2-2	Montedio Yamagata	City Light Stadium	10,397
18	2018.06.09	Renofa Yamaguchi FC	1-0	Fagiano Okayama	Ishin Me-Life Stadium	7,902
19	2018.06.17	Fagiano Okayama	0-0	Yokohama FC	City Light Stadium	9,776
20	2018.06.23	Kamatamare Sanuki	1-0	Fagiano Okayama	Pikara Stadium	5,668
15	2018.06.27	Fagiano Okayama	0-1	Tokyo Verdy	City Light Stadium	6,709
21	2018.07.01	Fagiano Okayama	3-3	Zweigen Kanazawa	City Light Stadium	7,070
22	2018.07.07	Tokyo Verdy	0-1	Fagiano Okayama	Ajinomoto Stadium	6,792
23	2018.07.16	Fagiano Okayama	0-0	Matsumoto Yamaga FC	City Light Stadium	7,780
24	2018.07.21	Ehime FC	2-0	Fagiano Okayama	Ningineer Stadium	3,135
25	2018.07.25	Montedio Yamagata	1-0	Fagiano Okayama	ND Soft Stadium Yamagata	4,675
27	2018.08.05	Fagiano Okayama	3-0	Kamatamare Sanuki	City Light Stadium	10,594
28	2018.08.11	Oita Trinita	4-1	Fagiano Okayama	Oita Bank Dome	11,064
29	2018.08.18	Zweigen Kanazawa	0-1	Fagiano Okayama	Ishikawa Athletics Stadium	3,573
26	2018.08.22	Fagiano Okayama	2-1	Tokushima Vortis	City Light Stadium	5,034
30	2018.08.26	Fagiano Okayama	0-1	Mito HollyHock	City Light Stadium	8,300
31	2018.09.01	Tochigi SC	0-1	Fagiano Okayama	Tochigi Green Stadium	3,890
32	2018.09.09	Fagiano Okayama	0-2	JEF United Chiba	City Light Stadium	5,470
33	2018.09.15	Fagiano Okayama	2-2	Kyoto Sanga FC	City Light Stadium	13,851
34	2018.09.22	Ventforet Kofu	2-0	Fagiano Okayama	Yamanashi Chuo Bank Stadium	6,810
35	2018.09.29	Fagiano Okayama	1-2	Albirex Niigata	City Light Stadium	6,170
36	2018.10.06	Avispa Fukuoka	1-1	Fagiano Okayama	Level5 Stadium	7,444
37	2018.10.13	FC Gifu	2-1	Fagiano Okayama	Gifu Nagaragawa Stadium	5,401
38	2018.10.21	Fagiano Okayama	1-0	FC Machida Zelvia	City Light Stadium	8,094
39	2018.10.28	Roasso Kumamoto	0-0	Fagiano Okayama	Egao Kenko Stadium	6,211
40	2018.11.04	Fagiano Okayama	0-1	Renofa Yamaguchi FC	City Light Stadium	8,467
41	2018.11.10	Yokohama FC	2-1	Fagiano Okayama	NHK Spring Mitsuzawa Football Stadium	10,978
42	2018.11.17	Fagiano Okayama	0-1	Omiya Ardija	City Light Stadium	8,861
