= 2015 Avispa Fukuoka season =

Avispa Fukuoka
2015 season
- Manager: Masami Ihara
- Stadium: Level5 Stadium
- J2 League: 3rd

2015 Avispa Fukuoka season.

== J2 League ==
=== League table ===
Pos	Team	Pld	W	D	L	GF	GA	GD	Pts	Promotion, qualification or relegation
2	Júbilo Iwata (P)	42	24	10	8	72	43	+29	82	Promotion to 2016 J1 League
3	Avispa Fukuoka (O, P)	42	24	10	8	63	37	+26	82	Qualification for promotion playoffs (Note: Only teams that meet J1 license criteria can participate in promotion playoffs. If one or more teams fail to meet the criteria, only eligible teams that finished 3rd to 6th will participate and no replacement teams will be added.)
4	Cerezo Osaka	42	18	13	11	57	40	+17	67	Qualification for promotion playoffs

Source: Meiji Yasuda J2 League Standing
Rules for classification: 1) Points; 2) Goal difference; 3) Goals scored
(O) Play-off winners; (P) Promoted

=== Match details ===
J2 League match details
Match	Date	Team	Score	Team	Venue	Attendance
1	2015.03.08	Avispa Fukuoka	1-3	Kyoto Sanga FC	Level5 Stadium	13,804
2	2015.03.15	Ehime FC	2-1	Avispa Fukuoka	Ningineer Stadium	2,489
3	2015.03.21	Consadole Sapporo	2-1	Avispa Fukuoka	Sapporo Dome	10,889
4	2015.03.29	Avispa Fukuoka	1-0	Roasso Kumamoto	Level5 Stadium	8,361
5	2015.04.01	Yokohama FC	2-2	Avispa Fukuoka	NHK Spring Mitsuzawa Football Stadium	2,208
6	2015.04.05	Avispa Fukuoka	1-0	Mito HollyHock	Level5 Stadium	4,553
7	2015.04.11	Oita Trinita	1-2	Avispa Fukuoka	Oita Bank Dome	7,332
8	2015.04.19	Giravanz Kitakyushu	0-1	Avispa Fukuoka	Honjo Stadium	5,184
9	2015.04.26	Avispa Fukuoka	2-2	FC Gifu	Level5 Stadium	6,091
10	2015.04.29	Júbilo Iwata	0-1	Avispa Fukuoka	Yamaha Stadium	10,382
11	2015.05.03	Avispa Fukuoka	1-0	Cerezo Osaka	Level5 Stadium	12,301
12	2015.05.06	Avispa Fukuoka	4-1	Thespakusatsu Gunma	Level5 Stadium	6,724
13	2015.05.09	Tochigi SC	0-0	Avispa Fukuoka	Tochigi Green Stadium	3,575
14	2015.05.17	Avispa Fukuoka	1-0	Fagiano Okayama	Level5 Stadium	5,018
15	2015.05.24	Avispa Fukuoka	1-3	Kamatamare Sanuki	Level5 Stadium	6,103
16	2015.05.31	Omiya Ardija	2-0	Avispa Fukuoka	NACK5 Stadium Omiya	8,543
17	2015.06.06	Avispa Fukuoka	1-0	Tokushima Vortis	Level5 Stadium	5,341
18	2015.06.14	JEF United Chiba	2-2	Avispa Fukuoka	Fukuda Denshi Arena	9,060
19	2015.06.21	Avispa Fukuoka	0-2	Zweigen Kanazawa	Level5 Stadium	7,212
20	2015.06.28	V-Varen Nagasaki	0-0	Avispa Fukuoka	Nagasaki Stadium	4,841
21	2015.07.04	Tokyo Verdy	1-1	Avispa Fukuoka	Ajinomoto Stadium	4,276
22	2015.07.08	Avispa Fukuoka	4-2	Giravanz Kitakyushu	Level5 Stadium	7,082
23	2015.07.12	Mito HollyHock	2-2	Avispa Fukuoka	K's denki Stadium Mito	4,161
24	2015.07.18	Avispa Fukuoka	1-3	Omiya Ardija	Level5 Stadium	8,179
25	2015.07.22	Kyoto Sanga FC	1-2	Avispa Fukuoka	Kyoto Nishikyogoku Athletic Stadium	3,206
26	2015.07.26	Avispa Fukuoka	0-0	V-Varen Nagasaki	Level5 Stadium	5,757
27	2015.08.01	Avispa Fukuoka	1-1	Oita Trinita	Level5 Stadium	6,559
28	2015.08.08	Zweigen Kanazawa	0-1	Avispa Fukuoka	Ishikawa Athletics Stadium	4,468
29	2015.08.15	Avispa Fukuoka	2-0	Júbilo Iwata	Level5 Stadium	8,715
30	2015.08.23	Fagiano Okayama	1-0	Avispa Fukuoka	City Light Stadium	8,145
31	2015.09.13	Kamatamare Sanuki	0-1	Avispa Fukuoka	Pikara Stadium	2,648
32	2015.09.20	Avispa Fukuoka	2-1	Consadole Sapporo	Level5 Stadium	13,873
33	2015.09.23	Roasso Kumamoto	0-1	Avispa Fukuoka	Umakana-Yokana Stadium	10,142
34	2015.09.27	Avispa Fukuoka	0-0	Tokyo Verdy	Level5 Stadium	7,588
35	2015.10.04	Cerezo Osaka	0-1	Avispa Fukuoka	Yanmar Stadium Nagai	13,843
36	2015.10.10	Avispa Fukuoka	1-0	JEF United Chiba	Level5 Stadium	8,004
37	2015.10.18	Avispa Fukuoka	4-2	Tochigi SC	Level5 Stadium	8,749
38	2015.10.25	Tokushima Vortis	0-3	Avispa Fukuoka	Pocarisweat Stadium	4,772
39	2015.11.01	Avispa Fukuoka	4-0	Yokohama FC	Level5 Stadium	16,776
40	2015.11.08	Thespakusatsu Gunma	0-4	Avispa Fukuoka	Shoda Shoyu Stadium Gunma	2,239
41	2015.11.14	Avispa Fukuoka	1-0	Ehime FC	Level5 Stadium	15,750
42	2015.11.23	FC Gifu	1-4	Avispa Fukuoka	Gifu Nagaragawa Stadium	9,296
