= 2014 Lunar New Year Cup =

International football competition

The 88th 2014 Lunar New Year Cup (Chinese: 馬年賀歲盃), also known as the Lunar New Year AET Cup 2014 (Chinese: 2014年AET賀歲盃) due to sponsorship reason, is the annual football event held in Hong Kong in Lunar New Year. Citizen are authorised by the Hong Kong Football Association to hold the event.

== Teams ==
| Team | Country | League last season | Pos. |
|---|---|---|---|
| Citizen CB Cuenca United | Hong Kong | Hong Kong First Division | 8th |
| Citizen CB Cuenca United | Ecuador | Ecuadorian Serie A | 8th |
| Krylia Sovetov | Russia | Russian Premier League | 14th |
| FC Tokyo | Japan | J. League D1 | 8th |
| Olhanense | Portugal | Primeira Liga | 14th |

== Squads ==
=== Citizen Cuenca United ===
| No. | Pos. | Player | Date of birth (age) | Caps | Club |
|---|---|---|---|---|---|
| 1 | GK | (Ecuador) Cristian Mora | 26 August 1979 (aged 34) | | (Ecuador) Deportivo Cuenca |
| 2 | DF | (Ecuador) Ronaldo Johnson | 15 April 1995 (aged 18) | | (Ecuador) Deportivo Cuenca |
| 3 | DF | (Hong Kong) Wong Yiu Fu | 6 August 1981 (aged 32) | | (Hong Kong) Citizen |
| 4 | DF | (Hong Kong) Sham Kwok Fai | 30 May 1984 (aged 29) | | (Hong Kong) Citizen |
| 5 | MF | (Serbia) Marko Krasić | 1 December 1985 (aged 28) | | (Hong Kong) Citizen |
| 7 | MF | (Nigeria) Festus Baise | 11 April 1980 (aged 33) | | (Hong Kong) Citizen |
| 8 | MF | (Hong Kong) So Loi Keung | 27 October 1982 (aged 31) | | (Hong Kong) Citizen |
| 9 | FW | (Brazil) Stefan Pereira | 16 April 1988 (aged 25) | | (Hong Kong) Citizen |
| 10 | FW | (Japan) Yuto Nakamura | 23 January 1987 (aged 27) | | (Hong Kong) Citizen |
| 11 | MF | (Hong Kong) Boris Si | 27 July 1994 (aged 19) | | (Hong Kong) Citizen |
| 14 | MF | (Hong Kong) Chan Siu Yuen | 2 November 1987 (aged 26) | | (Hong Kong) Citizen |
| 15 | MF | (Argentina) Alejandro Frezzotti | 15 February 1984 (aged 29) | | (Ecuador) Deportivo Cuenca |
| 16 | MF | (Hong Kong) Tam Lok Hin | 12 January 1990 (aged 24) | | (Hong Kong) Citizen |
| 17 | MF | (Ecuador) Galo Corozo | 20 August 1990 (aged 23) | | (Ecuador) Deportivo Cuenca |
| 18 | FW | (Hong Kong) Sham Kwok Keung | 10 September 1985 (aged 28) | | (Hong Kong) Citizen |
| 19 | FW | (Brazil) Paulinho Piracicaba | 16 January 1983 (aged 31) | | (Hong Kong) Citizen |
| 20 | FW | (Ecuador) Silvio Gutiérrez | 28 February 1993 (aged 20) | | (Ecuador) Deportivo Cuenca |
| 21 | FW | (Ecuador) Freddy Araújo | 10 September 1993 (aged 20) | | (Ecuador) Deportivo Cuenca |
| 23 | DF | (Brazil) Hélio José de Souza Gonçalves | 31 January 1986 (aged 28) | | (Hong Kong) Citizen |
| 24 | MF | (Ecuador) Wálter Zea | 7 January 1985 (aged 29) | | (Ecuador) Deportivo Cuenca |
| 25 | MF | (Ecuador) Adrián Arias | 15 October 1994 (aged 19) | | (Ecuador) Deportivo Cuenca |
| 26 | DF | (Ecuador) Andrés López | 4 February 1993 (aged 20) | | (Ecuador) Deportivo Cuenca |
| 27 | DF | (Hong Kong) Chan Hin Kwong | 27 February 1988 (aged 25) | | (Hong Kong) Citizen |
| 28 | FW | (Ecuador) Joffre Escobar | 24 October 1996 (aged 17) | | (Ecuador) Deportivo Cuenca |
| 29 | GK | (Hong Kong) Tse Tak Him | 10 February 1985 (aged 28) | | (Hong Kong) Citizen |
| 30 | FW | (Brazil) Detinho | 11 September 1973 (aged 40) | | (Hong Kong) Citizen |
| | DF | (Ecuador) Eduardo Morante | 1 June 1987 (aged 26) | | (Ecuador) Deportivo Cuenca |

=== Krylia Sovetov ===
| No. | Pos. | Player | Date of birth (age) | Caps | Club |
|---|---|---|---|---|---|
| 1 | GK | (Russia) Denis Vavilin | 4 July 1982 (aged 31) | | (Russia) Krylia Sovetov |
| 2 | MF | (Belarus) Stanislaw Drahun | 4 June 1988 (aged 25) | | (Russia) Krylia Sovetov |
| 3 | DF | (Brazil) Nadson José Ferreira | 18 October 1984 (aged 29) | | (Russia) Krylia Sovetov |
| 4 | DF | (Russia) Ivan Taranov | 22 June 1986 (aged 27) | | (Russia) Krylia Sovetov |
| 5 | DF | (Georgia (country)) Aleksandr Amisulashvili | 20 August 1982 (aged 31) | | (Russia) Krylia Sovetov |
| 6 | DF | (Brazil) Bruno Teles | 1 May 1986 (aged 27) | | (Russia) Krylia Sovetov |
| 7 | MF | (Russia) Pyotr Nemov | 18 October 1983 (aged 30) | | (Russia) Krylia Sovetov |
| 8 | FW | (Belarus) Sergei Kornilenko | 14 June 1983 (aged 30) | | (Russia) Krylia Sovetov |
| 9 | FW | (Paraguay) Luis Nery Caballero | 22 April 1990 (aged 23) | | (Russia) Krylia Sovetov |
| 11 | MF | (Russia) Aleksandr Pavlenko | 20 January 1985 (aged 29) | | (Russia) Krylia Sovetov |
| 14 | MF | (Russia) Aleksandr Yeliseyev | 15 November 1991 (aged 22) | | (Russia) Krylia Sovetov |
| 15 | DF | (Russia) Ibragim Tsallagov | 12 December 1990 (aged 23) | | (Russia) Krylia Sovetov |
| 17 | MF | (Russia) Viktor Kuzmichyov | 19 March 1992 (aged 21) | | (Russia) Krylia Sovetov |
| 20 | MF | (Russia) Igor Semshov | 6 April 1978 (aged 35) | | (Russia) Krylia Sovetov |
| 21 | MF | (Russia) Ruslan Adzhindzhal | 22 June 1974 (aged 39) | | (Russia) Krylia Sovetov |
| 22 | DF | (Haiti) Réginal Goreux | 31 December 1987 (aged 26) | | (Russia) Krylia Sovetov |
| 23 | MF | (Russia) Yevgeni Balyaikin | 19 May 1988 (aged 25) | | (Russia) Krylia Sovetov |
| 28 | DF | (Germany) Felicio Brown Forbes | 28 August 1991 (aged 22) | | (Russia) Krylia Sovetov |
| 40 | DF | (Russia) Sergei Bozhin | 12 September 1994 (aged 19) | | (Russia) Krylia Sovetov |
| 67 | MF | (Russia) Emin Makhmudov | 27 April 1992 (aged 21) | | (Russia) Krylia Sovetov |
| 84 | MF | (Russia) Roman Vorobyov | 24 March 1984 (aged 29) | | (Russia) Krylia Sovetov |
| 82 | GK | (Belarus) Syarhey Vyeramko | 16 October 1982 (aged 31) | | (Russia) Krylia Sovetov |
| 99 | GK | (Slovakia) Ján Mucha | 5 December 1982 (aged 31) | | (Russia) Krylia Sovetov |
| | DF | (Russia) Dmitri Yatchenko | 25 August 1986 (aged 27) | | (Russia) Krylia Sovetov |

=== FC Tokyo ===
| No. | Pos. | Player | Date of birth (age) | Caps | Club |
|---|---|---|---|---|---|
| 1 | GK | (Japan) Hitoshi Shiota | 28 May 1981 (aged 32) | | (Japan) FC Tokyo |
| 2 | MF | (Japan) Yūhei Tokunaga | 25 September 1983 (aged 30) | | (Japan) FC Tokyo |
| 3 | DF | (Japan) Masato Morishige (captain) | 21 May 1987 (aged 26) | | (Japan) FC Tokyo |
| 4 | MF | (Japan) Hideto Takahashi | 17 October 1987 (aged 26) | | (Japan) FC Tokyo |
| 5 | DF | (Japan) Kenichi Kaga | 30 September 1983 (aged 30) | | (Japan) FC Tokyo |
| 6 | DF | (Japan) Kosuke Ota | 23 July 1987 (aged 26) | | (Japan) FC Tokyo |
| 7 | MF | (Japan) Takuji Yonemoto | 23 January 1990 (aged 24) | | (Japan) FC Tokyo |
| 8 | MF | (Japan) Hirotaka Mita | 14 September 1990 (aged 23) | | (Japan) FC Tokyo |
| 9 | FW | (Japan) Kazuma Watanabe | 10 August 1986 (aged 27) | | (Japan) FC Tokyo |
| 11 | FW | (Brazil) Edu | 30 November 1981 (aged 32) | | (Japan) FC Tokyo |
| 13 | FW | (Japan) Sōta Hirayama | 6 June 1985 (aged 28) | | (Japan) FC Tokyo |
| 17 | FW | (Japan) Hiroki Kawano | 30 March 1990 (aged 23) | | (Japan) FC Tokyo |
| 18 | MF | (Japan) Naohiro Ishikawa | 12 May 1981 (aged 32) | | (Japan) FC Tokyo |
| 20 | GK | (Japan) Shūichi Gonda | 3 March 1989 (aged 24) | | (Japan) FC Tokyo |
| 21 | GK | (Japan) Ryotaro Hironaga | 9 January 1990 (aged 24) | | (Japan) FC Tokyo |
| 22 | MF | (Japan) Naotake Hanyu | 22 December 1979 (aged 34) | | (Japan) FC Tokyo |
| 25 | DF | (Brazil) Matheus Ferraz | 12 February 1989 (aged 24) | | (Japan) FC Tokyo |
| 28 | MF | (Japan) Shuto Kono | 4 May 1993 (aged 20) | | (Japan) FC Tokyo |
| 29 | DF | (Japan) Kazunori Yoshimoto | 24 April 1988 (aged 25) | | (Japan) FC Tokyo |
| 33 | DF | (Japan) Kenta Mukuhara | 6 July 1989 (aged 24) | | (Japan) FC Tokyo |
| 34 | MF | (Japan) Hideyuki Nozawa | 15 August 1994 (aged 19) | | (Japan) FC Tokyo |
| 38 | MF | (Japan) Keigo Higashi | 20 July 1990 (aged 23) | | (Japan) FC Tokyo |
| 41 | MF | (Japan) Wataru Sasaki | 28 July 1996 (aged 17) | | (Japan) FC Tokyo |
| 42 | DF | (Japan) Takuma Onishi | 30 April 1996 (aged 17) | | (Japan) FC Tokyo |

=== Olhanense ===
| No. | Pos. | Player | Date of birth (age) | Caps | Club |
|---|---|---|---|---|---|
| 1 | GK | (Sweden) Jonas Sandqvist | 6 May 1981 (aged 32) | | Free agent |
| 2 | DF | (Mali) Mahamet Diagouraga | 8 January 1984 (aged 30) | | Free agent |
| 5 | MF | (Italy) Giuseppe Colucci | 24 August 1980 (aged 33) | | (Portugal) Olhanense |
| 11 | FW | (Georgia (country)) Apollon Lemondzhava | 2 March 1991 (aged 22) | | (Netherlands) Lienden |
| 12 | GK | (Brazil) Leandro Turossi | 3 February 1992 (aged 21) | | (Portugal) Olhanense |
| 13 | DF | (Portugal) Ricardo Fialho | 17 February 1995 (aged 18) | | (Portugal) Olhanense |
| 14 | FW | (Portugal) Renato Favinha | 14 January 1996 (aged 18) | | (Portugal) Olhanense |
| 16 | FW | (Portugal) Miguel Bandarra | 17 January 1996 (aged 18) | | (Portugal) Olhanense |
| 17 | DF | (Albania) Agonit Sallaj | 14 February 1992 (aged 21) | | Free agent |
| 18 | MF | (Venezuela) Jonathan Gonçalves | 24 December 1995 (aged 18) | | (Portugal) Olhanense |
| 19 | MF | (Portugal) Ricardo Gonçalves | 24 December 1980 (aged 33) | | Free agent |
| 23 | DF | (Croatia) Tin Karamatić | 1 March 1993 (aged 20) | | (Portugal) Olhanense |
| 29 | FW | (Brazil) Murilo Mendes | 8 March 1995 (aged 18) | | (Portugal) Olhanense |
| 74 | DF | (France) Jean-Christophe Coubronne | 30 July 1989 (aged 24) | | (Portugal) Olhanense |
| 77 | FW | (Slovakia) Jakub Vojtuš | 22 October 1993 (aged 20) | | (Portugal) Olhanense |
| | FW | (Cameroon) Jean Paul Yontcha | 15 May 1983 (aged 30) | | Free agent |
| | MF | (Nigeria) Christian Obodo | 11 May 1984 (aged 29) | | (Portugal) Olhanense |
| | DF | (Serbia) Mladen Veselinović | 22 May 1992 (aged 21) | | (Serbia) Donji Srem |
| | MF | (Serbia) Marko Jevtović | 24 July 1993 (aged 20) | | (Serbia) Novi Pazar |

== Fixtures and results ==
=== Semi-finals ===
| 15 February 2014 | FC Tokyo (Japan) | 1–1 (5–6 p) | (Portugal) Olhanense | So Kon Po, Hong Kong |
| 14:45 (UTC+8) | Mita 67' | Report | Mendes (yellow card) 30'; Lemondzhava (yellow card) 42'; Colucci 52' (pen.); Vojtuš (yellow card) 59'; R. Gonçalves (yellow card) 84' | Stadium: Hong Kong Stadium; Attendance: 12,174; Referee: Liu Kwok Man; Assistant referees: Chan Shui Hung, Lam Chi Ho; Fourth official: Ng Chiu Kok |
| | Penalties |
| | Watanabe (penalty missed); Mita (penalty scored); Kono (penalty scored); Ishikawa (penalty scored); Edu (penalty scored); Yonemoto (penalty scored); Tokunaga (penalty missed) | | (penalty scored) Colucci; (penalty scored) Diagouraga; (penalty missed) Vojtuš; (penalty scored) Lemondzhava; (penalty scored) R. Gonçalves; (penalty scored) J. Gonçalves; (penalty scored) Sallaj |

| 15 February 2014 | Citizen Cuenca United (Hong Kong) (Ecuador) | 2–2 (4–2 p) | (Russia) Krylia Sovetov | So Kon Po, Hong Kong |
| 17:15 (UTC+8) | Frezzotti (yellow card) 78'; Corozo (yellow card) 81'; Detinho 90'; Krasić 90+3'; Krasić (yellow card) 90+3' | Report | Caballero 33' (pen.); Pavlenko 70'; Balyaikin (yellow card) 75'; Goreux (yellow card) 78' | Stadium: Hong Kong Stadium; Attendance: 12,174; Referee: Ng Kai Lam; Assistant referees: Cheng Oi Cho, Yau Ho Fai; Fourth official: Ho Wai Sing |
| | Penalties |
| | Krasić (penalty scored); Corozo (penalty scored); Detinho (penalty missed); Festus (penalty scored); Frezzotti (penalty scored) | | (penalty missed) Pavlenko; (penalty scored) Makhmudov; (penalty missed) Amisulashvili; (penalty scored) Balyaikin |

=== Third Place Playoff ===
| 18 February 2014 | FC Tokyo (Japan) | 0–1 | (Russia) Krylia Sovetov | So Kon Po, Hong Kong |
| 14:45 (UTC+8) | | Report | Caballero (yellow card) 18'; Semshov (yellow card) 38'; Drahun (yellow card) 39'; Adzhindzhal 41'; Forbes (yellow card) 65'; Kornilenko (yellow card) 88' | Stadium: Hong Kong Stadium; Attendance: 13,432; Referee: Ng Chiu Kok; Assistant referees: Lam Nai Kei, Sarao Amarrjit Singh; Fourth official: Ho Wai Sing |

=== Final ===
| 18 February 2014 | Citizen Cuenca United (Hong Kong) (Ecuador) | 2–0 | (Portugal) Olhanense | So Kon Po, Hong Kong |
| 17:15 (UTC+8) | Sham Kwok Keung 16'; Wong Yiu Fu (yellow card) 43'; Krasić 50' | Report | Diagouraga (yellow card) 54' | Stadium: Hong Kong Stadium; Attendance: 13,432; Referee: Tong Kui Sum; Assistant referees: Chow Chun Kit, Lam Chi Ho; Fourth official: Lui Kwok Man |
