= The Australian Dream (2019 film) =

2019 documentary film

- Directed by: Daniel Gordon
- Screenplay by: Stan Grant
- Produced by: Nick Batzias; John Battsek; Virginia Whitwell; Sarah Thomson
- Starring: Adam Goodes; Stan Grant; Nova Peris; Gilbert McAdam; Tracey Holmes; Linda Burney; Nicky Winmar; Nathan Buckley; Natalie Goodes
- Cinematography: Dylan River
- Edited by: Matt Wyllie
- Music by: Cornel Wilczek
- Production companies: Good Thing Productions; Passion Pictures
- Distributed by: Madman Entertainment (Australia); Lorton Entertainment (International)
- Release dates: 3 August 2019 (MIFF); 22 August 2019 (Australia)
- Running time: 105 minutes
- Countries: Australia; UK

The Australian Dream, also known as Australian Dream, is a feature-length documentary film released in Australia in 2019. Featuring Australian Football League (AFL) player Adam Goodes, the film examines Australian Aboriginal identity and racism in modern Australia, with the sustained booing of Goodes by spectators as a starting point.

It was written by award-winning journalist Stan Grant and directed by British director Daniel Gordon, and won the AACTA Award for best feature documentary in the 2019 series of the awards.

== Synopsis ==
=== Background ===
Goodes, an Aboriginal Australian of Adnyamathanha and Narungga heritage, was drafted by the Sydney Swans in the 1997 AFL draft and went on to have a successful career with the Swans, being awarded a number of accolades for his performance including the AFL Rising Star award in 1999, the Brownlow Medal (2003 and 2006), the Bob Skilton Medal (2003, 2006 and 2011), and All Australian selection (2003, 2006, 2009 and 2011). In 2014 he was named Australian of the Year in recognition of his community work supporting Aboriginal Australian and Torres Strait Islander youth, the efforts of the Go Foundation (co-founded with his Sydney Swans teammate Michael O'Loughlin), and his efforts to combat racism.

On 24 May 2013, during the AFL's annual Indigenous Round (the Sir Doug Nicholls Round), a 13-year-old Collingwood supporter called Goodes an "ape". Upon hearing the abuse, Goodes pointed the girl out to security, who ejected her from the stadium. Goodes was deeply affected by the incident, but said repeatedly that the girl should not be blamed; the environment that she grew up in had shaped her response. The girl phoned to apologise, saying that she hadn't realised the impact of her words.

Over the following years, and particularly in 2015, Goodes was repeatedly and loudly booed by opposition fans at most matches. The motivation for, and acceptability of, the booing generated wide public debate, which dominated media coverage from both sports and political commentators for weeks at a time.

During a match against Carlton in May 2015, again during the Indigenous Round, Goodes celebrated a goal by performing an Aboriginal war dance, in which he mimed throwing a spear in the direction of the Carlton cheer squad. Goodes said after the incident that the dance was based on one he learned from under-16s Indigenous team the Flying Boomerangs, and that it was intended as an expression of Indigenous pride during Indigenous Round, not as a means of offending or intimidating the crowd. The booing of Goodes intensified in the months after the war dance. Goodes took indefinite leave from the game in August of the 2015 season. Many clubs and players in the AFL supported Goodes in the week of his leave. He returned the following week and played for the remainder of the season after an outpouring of support from fans, actors, politicians, celebrities and teammates, including two spontaneous standing ovations.

Goodes retired from AFL in September 2015. He did not attend the Grand Final, where retiring players traditionally take part in a parade, one of only a handful of players to decline this invitation since the parade for retiring players was established.

=== The film ===
The Australian Dream tells the story of Goodes' life, from before he became a professional footballer through to his later career as an activist for Indigenous rights in Australia. It includes archival footage of as well as recent interviews with a range of Australians, including Indigenous and non-Indigenous people – politicians, sportspeople, politicians, media commentators and Grant himself.

With Grant commenting on or explaining each segment of the film, it is only at the end that the title is explained, when it includes his 2016 address at the 2019 IQ2 debate, which went viral. In it, he delivers a powerful message about how discrimination and colonisation are the base on which the “Australian dream” is built.

== Cast ==
All as themselves:

- Adam Goodes
- Stan Grant
- Nova Peris
- Linda Burney
- Michael O'Loughlin
- Nicky Winmar
- Gilbert McAdam
- Tracey Holmes
- John Longmire
- Natalie Goodes
- Nathan Buckley
- Paul Roos
- Brett Goodes
- Eddie McGuire
- Andrew Bolt

== Themes ==
The film looks broadly at the part played by race and identity in Australian history and today's society. It questions "what it means to be Australian" and "If the Australian Dream is rooted in racism, what can be done to redefine it for the next generation?".

== Production ==
The Australian Dream was written by the Aboriginal Australian journalist Stan Grant, and directed by British director Daniel Gordon. The person at the centre of the themes explored in the film, footballer Adam Goodes, participated in the making of the film, as did most of the rest of the cast.

It was co-created by British production company Passion Pictures and local outfit Good Thing Productions, with funding from the Australian Government, Screen Australia and Film Victoria.

== Release ==
The film had its world premiere at the Melbourne International Film Festival (MIFF) on 3 August 2019, and was released in Australian cinemas on 22 August 2019.

It was also presented at the 2019 Toronto International Film Festival, Toronto (TIFF 2019) (5 to 15 September 2019), Telluride Film Festival (31 September–2 October 2019), BFI London (2–13 October 2019), International Documentary Film Festival Amsterdam (November 2019) and the Palm Springs Film Festival (7 January 2020).

It was shown on ABC TV in Australia on 23 February 2020, and is available online for Australian audiences as well as on the streaming service Kayo.

== Critical response ==
The film was among the best-reviewed, most-publicised Australian films of 2019.

The film's website cites five-star ratings by the Herald Sun and Student Edge, and four and a half from The Age and Switch.

The Guardian gives the film four stars. Like several other reviewers, it makes mention of the other 2019 documentary film on the same topic, The Final Quarter, saying that commentators Andrew Bolt and Eddie McGuire get more screen time in The Australian Dream, giving them a platform they do not deserve to justify their contrary views, but overall "it speaks loudly and articulately" on an important topic.

InDaily called it "a brilliant exploration of racism in this country", and a "more comprehensive analysis" of the treatment of Goodes than The Final Quarter. Regarding it as essential viewing for all Australians, the reviewer says that the Indigenous voices in the film are not trying to divide Australia, but rather "seeking unity and reconciliation through truth and respect".

The US magazine Variety called it a "smart, solutions-oriented essay film" and "an urgent and engaging call to action", and noted parallels with racism in the United States.

The Telegraph UK gave the film 4/5 stars describing the documentary as "a thoughtful, but ultimately depressing documentary" which tackles "the ugly race storm" at the heart of Australia's national game.

== Audience response and box office ==
The film earned a 10-minute standing ovation after its first showing at the Melbourne International Film Festival, which is very unusual, but it did not do well at the box office in Australia after its release in late August. This was attributed partly to the earlier release of another documentary on the same topic, The Final Quarter, partly to the general unwillingness of audiences to engage with the topic or expose themselves to an alternative viewpoint, and other factors. The manager of a Melbourne cinema where the film attracted big audiences suggested that "progressive audiences are receptive to the film and its message", but in some markets there was probably "a resistance to engage with a message that will be, for many, uncomfortable viewing".

It won the Audience Award for Best Documentary Feature at MIFF.

== Accolades ==
- 2019 AACTA Award - Best Feature Documentary
- 2019 Walkley Documentary Award
- 2020 - Best Documentary - Asian Academy Creative Awards

As mentioned above, it won the Audience Award for Best Documentary Feature at MIFF.

== See also ==
- The Final Quarter (June 2019 film featuring Adam Goodes)
