= Amrita Cheema =

Indian journalist

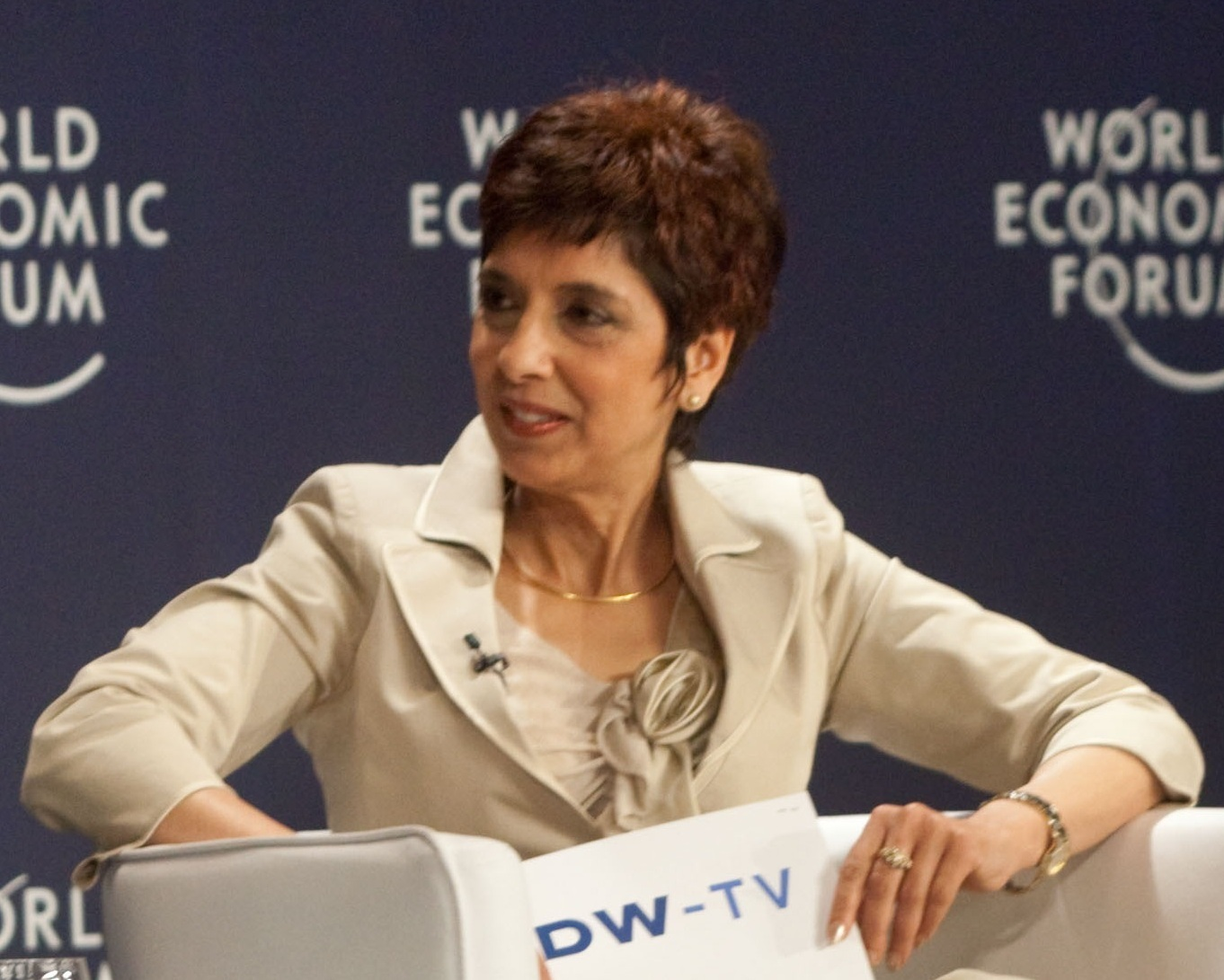
- Amrita Cheema at the World Economic Forum on Latin America in 2011.
- Born: Deolali, India
- Education: University of Oxford
- Occupation(s): Journalist and News presenter

Amrita Cheema is an Indian journalist. She has been working since 1999 as a news presenter with the German international TV broadcaster Deutsche Welle-TV. From 2005 to 2008, she spent some years with the Australian broadcaster SBS Television.

Cheema is a Rhodes Scholar with a D.Phil. in Modern History from the University of Oxford in 1988. She went to Britain after obtaining a first class B.A. and M.A. degree from St. Stephen's College, Delhi. She taught nineteenth century German history at the University of Maryland in Bonn before joining Radio Deutsche Welle's English Service in Cologne.

== Career ==
Cheema was an editor and anchor of Star News Sunday in Delhi. This 60-minute programme with investigative reports and live interviews had the highest television rating points for a news and current affairs show in the country. She also anchored prime time Star News English bulletins, Newshour and election specials. In 1994, she was part of a team which launched India's first news and current affairs television channel Television International (TVI), under the Business India TV umbrella.

Cheema moved to Berlin in 1998 to become one of the hosts of the German international broadcasters Deutsche Welle English language edition of the Journal, their television news program. She also produced People and Politics and European Journal. In 2000, she worked on the DW-TV's documentary The Truth Is in No Hurry.

As a journalist, she has interviewed world leaders, dissidents, and newsmakers.

Cheema had lived in Europe for more than sixteen years.

In 2005, Cheema moved to Sydney, Australia and began working for the public multicultural television network SBS Television on World News Australia, where she co-hosted the 6.30 pm bulletin with Anton Enus on weekdays.

In 2008, Cheema resigned from SBS, and read her final bulletin on 6 June 2008. She since has returned to Deutsche Welle in Germany.
