= Enus =

Enus is a given name and surname. Notable people with the name include:

- Anton Enus, South African-born Australian news presenter
- Enus Mariani (born 1998), Italian artistic gymnast
