= Ricardo Gonçalves =

Australian television presenter

Ricardo Jorge Gonçalves
- Born: 24 January 1981 (age 45); Wollongong, New South Wales
- Other names: Richard Goncalves; Ric G
- Education: University of Wollongong
- Occupation: television journalist
- Years active: 1998–present
- Known for: presenting news bulletins and programs on SBS
- Television: SBS World News; Small Business Secrets

Ricardo Jorge Gonçalves (born 24 January 1981) is a Portuguese Australian television journalist and presenter, best known for his work at SBS.

As of July 2022, Gonçalves is the network's finance editor where he presents a nightly finance report on SBS World News and also fronts the SBS On the Money Podcast.

He also anchors the SBS World News Late.

Since 2016, Gonçalves has hosted Small Business Secrets.

== Career ==
Gonçalves commenced his television career at WIN Television in Wollongong, where unpaid work experience led to him becoming a casual WIN News reporter in 1998 while he was studying commerce at the University of Wollongong.

In 1999, Gonçalves set up a website to offer advice to high school students about study techniques leading to his assistance with the Seven Network current affairs program Today Tonight with a number of education-related reports.

Gonçalves commenced working as a business journalist for finance expert David Koch's production company Palamedia in 2001. Based at the Seven Network in Sydney, he provided content for Seven, Sky News Australia and 2GB.

He moved to Melbourne in 2004, where he worked as a reporter for National Nine News on Nine Network and as a volunteer breakfast news presenter on LGBTIQ+ community radio station Joy FM where he was known on air as "Ric G."

Gonçalves returned to Sydney in 2007 where he produced and anchored coverage for the Sky News Business Channel.

He joined SBS in 2010.

In April 2020, Gonçalves unusually had to take over from Janice Petersen halfway through an SBS World News bulletin due to Petersen's vision deteriorating caused by an object in her eye.

== Personal life ==
Gonçalves was born in Wollongong, New South Wales. His parents had migrated to Australia from Portugal in the late 1970s. Portuguese was his first language during his early childhood.

He attended Edmund Rice College in Wollongong, where he was school captain.

Throughout his early career, Gonçalves called himself by the name of Richard which his teachers had preferred to use instead of Ricardo. Gonçalves continued to use the name Richard while also anglicising his surname to enhance his career prospects due to the lack of cultural diversity on Australian television.

Gonçalves appeared on a 1998 episode of Australian game show Wheel of Fortune.

Gonçalves successfully auditioned for an Australian pop group called Sneaky Deep in 2000, and recorded a three-track demo CD with the group. However, he was let go from the group after approximately six months after being told his vocal abilities weren't developing enough. After Gonçalves left the group, they signed a publishing deal with Warner Music Australia but disbanded soon after.

Gonçalves is known for his love of Eurovision and in 2018 was appointed as Australia's spokesperson for the 2018 Eurovision Song Contest, taking over from Lee Lin Chin.

He is an Australia Day ambassador.
