= Newsnight (disambiguation) =

Newsnight is a British news and current affairs TV programme.

Newsnight, or variants, may also refer to:

- CNN NewsNight, an American live news TV program
- News Night, a Philippine TV news broadcasting show
- Reporting Live, formerly NewsNight, an Australian TV news and commentary program
