= SBS World News =

Australian news service

- Division of: Special Broadcasting Service
- Founded: 1980
- Headquarters: 14 Herbert Street, Artarmon, Sydney, Australia
- Area served: Worldwide
- Formerly called: Channel 0-28 News (1980–1983); SBS World News (1983–2005); World News Australia (2005–2014)
- Broadcast programs: Dateline; Insight; Living Black; The Observer Effect
- Parent: Special Broadcasting Service
- Website: sbs.com.au/news

SBS World News is the news service of the Special Broadcasting Service in Australia. Its flagship nightly bulletin is broadcast at 6:30 pm on SBS with additional weeknight late bulletins from 10:30 pm on SBS. SBS News is also available as a news app and website.

== History ==
The World News began as a half-hour bulletin, first seen in 1980, soon after the launch of the then-named Channel 0/28. George Donikian was the service's first presenter; veteran newsreader Mary Kostakidis began reading the weekend news in 1986. The network's long-running investigative documentary series Dateline started in 1984.

Closed captioning for the SBS World News television service was introduced in March 1997.

In 2002, a digital-only World News Channel was launched, aimed at providing a comprehensive foreign-language news channel, mainly showing additional bulletins already seen in SBS' morning WorldWatch timeslot. No English-language bulletins were shown on the channel until its demise in 2009.

World News Australia was relaunched in its current one-hour format in January 2007 taking over the timeslot of Toyota World Sport and signing CNN correspondent Stan Grant to co-present alongside Mary Kostakidis. The merger between the two programs took place as a result of a claimed drop-off in viewers between programs, when a solid block of advertising would be shown. As a result, the relaunch saw the introduction of commercial breaks during the bulletin.

The new bulletin format has since lost viewers, with the late bulletin often out-rating the flagship 6:30 pm bulletin; most of this has been attributed to the perceived commercialisation of the bulletin by the SBS Board.

A dispute between longtime presenter Mary Kostakidis and the network arose in August 2007, when she walked out of the network in frustration at what she saw as increased commercialisation at the network, and a shift away from the original values of both the news service and the station in general. It was widely speculated that Kostakidis' contract stipulated she would be the network's main news presenter, and maintain editorial control over bulletins, somewhat altered by World News Australia's change in format. Kostakidis took legal action against SBS for breach of contract.

In 2009, World News Channel was replaced with SBS Two which became SBS Viceland in 2016.

In February 2014, World News Australia was relaunched with new graphics along with a name, SBS World News.

In 2017, SBS World News was upgraded with a new set and improved website. The program can now be streamed on the SBS News website as well as the SBS News app.

== Theme music ==
From 1980 to 1991, Processional Fanfare by the Philip Jones Brass Ensemble was used as the main theme. Since 1991, the World News and World News Australia themes have been written by Australian composer Nigel Westlake.

== Bulletins ==
=== SBS World News ===
SBS World News is broadcast nightly at 6:30 pm and is Australia's only locally-produced news bulletin that focuses on world events. It is presented by Janice Petersen from Sunday to Thursday and Catalina Flórez on Friday and Saturday. Finance is presented by Ricardo Gonçalves on weeknights.

Fill in presenters for the bulletin include: Ricardo Gonçalves and Darren Mara (News); Robert Grasso, Mariana Rudan and Lucy Zelić (Sport); and Catalina Flórez, Virginia Langeberg or Darren Mara (Finance).

=== SBS World News Late ===
SBS World News Late was originally known as World News at Nine (reflecting its original 9:00 pm position), then as World News Tonight when it moved to 9:30 pm. It no longer has any branding distinct from the main 6:30 pm bulletin. In 2012, the bulletin moved to a later timeslot of 10:30 pm.

Regular presenters for this bulletin include Ricardo Gonçalves, Darren Mara and Catalina Flórez. Occasional presenters for the bulletin include Virginia Langeberg and Lin Evlin.

Previous presenters include Anton Enus, Ben Fajzullin, Neena Mairata, Amrita Cheema, Indira Naidoo and PJ Madam.

== Former bulletins ==
=== World News Australia Online ===
Until its end in August 2006, the specially produced online news bulletins were presented by Ashleigh Nghiem. The online bulletins have since been replaced by stand-alone reports.

== Radio ==
SBS radio news bulletins are broadcast throughout the day—including the flagship national bulletins, but also feature more national and international news stories.

=== National bulletins ===
The main national bulletins are broadcast on SBS Radio on the hour, 24 hours a day, SBS World News Radio airs weekdays from 6 am and 6 pm on SBS Radio 1. National bulletins air on SBS Radio broadcasts the foreign-language news bulletins on SBS World News Australia Radio.

== Presenters ==
SBS World News

- Janice Petersen
- Catalina Flórez
- Ricardo Gonçalves
- Rena Sarumpaet
- Darren Mara

Programs

- Jenny Brockie
- Lucy Zelić

== Former presenters ==
Former presenters of World News Australia include Mary Kostakidis and Stan Grant, who both departed in 2007, Amrita Cheema who resigned in June 2008 and Ben Fajzullin who resigned in 2010. In October 2010, it was announced that Neena Mairata would leave SBS due to cost-cutting measures. In 1999, Susanne Annabellem Robinson and Micahel both filled in on the World Tonight.

Lee Lin Chin worked for almost 40 years with SBS. In 2018, she announced her resignation.

In July 2026, Anton Enus announced that he would retire from SBS World News in September after 27 years with the network. He presented his final bulletin on 11 September 2026.

- Les Murray
- Lee Lin Chin
- Andrew Orsatti
- George Donikian
- Indira Naidoo
- Craig Foster
- George Negus
- Kathy Novak
- Mary Kostakidis
- Ellen Fanning
- Sarah Abo
- Stan Grant
- Amrita Cheema
- Ben Fajzullin
- Paul Dempsey
- Basia Bonkowski
- Neena Mairata
- Peta-Jane Madam
- Yalda Hakim
- Anjali Rao
- Karla Grant
- Mike Tomalaris
- Anton Enus

== Website and app ==
Their website is available at sbs.com.au/news. There is also an app called SBS News.

== Logo history ==
2007–2009

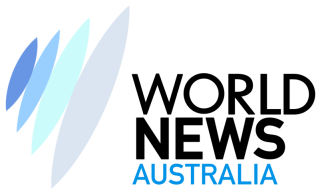
2009–2014

2014–2015

2015–2017

2017–2022

2022–present

== See also ==
- Mandarin News Australia
