= Héctor Cruz (footballer) =

Peruvian footballer (born 1991)

Personal information
- Full name: Héctor Micheal Cruz Cheng
- Date of birth: January 18, 1991 (age 35)
- Place of birth: Lima, Peru
- Height: 1.85 m (6 ft 1 in)
- Position: Center forward

Team information
- Current team: Los Caimanes

Youth career
- 2001–2010: Sporting Cristal

Senior career*
Years	Team	Apps	(Gls)
2008–2011	Sporting Cristal	5	(0)
2011–2012	León de Huánuco	16	(3)
2012	Sport Boys	10	(2)
2013–	Los Caimanes		

International career
- Peru-20
- * Club domestic league appearances and goals as of 2 January 2012

Héctor André Cruz Cheng (born 18 January 1991) is a Peruvian footballer from Lima who currently plays for Los Caimanes in the Peruvian Segunda División.

== Club career ==
Cruz came from Sporting Cristal's youth divisions. On December 14, 2008, he debuted with Sporting Cristal in a match against Sport Boys.
