= Matter of Fact with Stan Grant =

2018 Australian current affairs TV series

- Genre: News and current affairs
- Presented by: Stan Grant
- Country of origin: Australia
- Original language: English

Production
- Executive producer: Sharon O'Neill
- Producer: Jamie Cummins
- Production locations: Sydney, New South Wales
- Running time: 45 minutes

Original release
- Network: ABC News
- Release: 29 January – 29 November 2018

Related
- 7.30

Matter of Fact with Stan Grant was an Australian news and current affairs television show which served as the flagship on the Australian Broadcasting Corporation's News Channel, hosted by journalist Stan Grant. It premiered on 29 January 2018, and ended 10 months later, in November 2018.

It was broadcast nationally across Australia live from ABC News's headquarters in Sydney at 9pm local time from Tuesday to Thursday, with a special "week in review" episode broadcast on Saturday evening. It was also streamed live on iview, simulcast on ABC News Radio and broadcast across the Asia/Pacific region on Australia Plus.

Matter of Fact premiered on 29 January 2018 with a program focused on the rise of China and changes to the geopolitical balance across the world. It has covered a range of topics including quantum technology, immigration to Australia and refugee crises, and the ways in which sport and politics collide. Focused on the Asia Pacific region, the discussion and interview program aimed to speak "to smart people about big ideas with expert analysis backed by facts".

In June 2018, the show was broadcast out of Singapore for the 2018 North Korea–United States summit, to take advantage of Grant's dual role as presenter of Matter of Fact, and the network's Chief Asia Correspondent.

In October 2018, it was announced that Grant would take up the new role of Indigenous and International Affairs Analyst with the ABC at the end of the year, after announcing his appointment as Professor of Global Affairs at Griffith University, with the show concluding on 29 November 2018.
