= Sidney Faiffer =

Peruvian footballer (born 1980)

Personal information
- Full name: Sidney Enrique Faiffer Ames
- Date of birth: 12 May 1980 (age 46)
- Place of birth: Lima, Peru
- Height: 1.81 m (5 ft 11 in)
- Position: Attacking midfielder

Senior career*
Years	Team	Apps	(Gls)
2002–2004	América Cochahuayco	?	(?)
2004	Deportivo Wanka	33	(2)
2005	Deportivo Aviación	?	(?)
2006–2007	Alianza Atlético	75	(12)
2008	Alianza Lima	40	(5)
2009–2011	Universidad César Vallejo	98	(10)
2012	León de Huánuco	22	(5)
2012–2013	Unión Comercio	30	(1)
2014	Defensor San Alejandro	-	(-)
2014	Cienciano	13	(0)
2015	Sport Huancayo	17	(4)
2016	Defensor La Bocana	40	(6)
2017–2018	Sport Boys	42	(4)
2019	Ayacucho	7	(0)
2020	Pirata	9	(4)

International career
2008	Peru	2	(0)
- * Club domestic league appearances and goals

Sidney Enrique Faiffer Ames (born 12 May 1980) is a Peruvian former professional footballer who played as an attacking midfielder.

== Club career ==
Faiffer was born in Lima. He made his debut in the Torneo Descentralizado in the 2003 season playing for Deportivo Wanka.

On 4 April 2020, 39-year old Faiffer joined Peruvian Segunda División club Pirata FC.
