= Ben Fajzullin =

Australian journalist (born 1976)

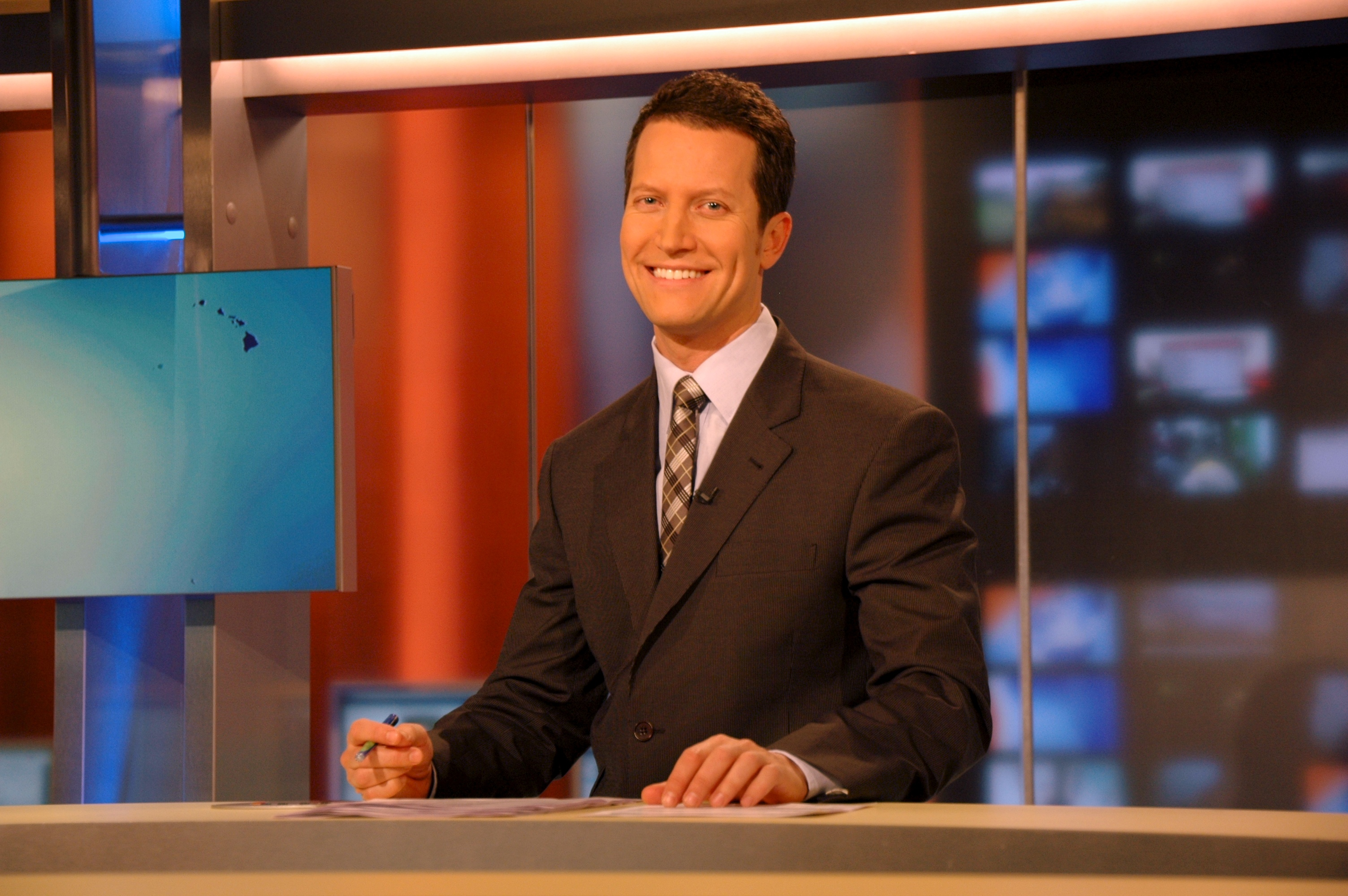
- Fajzullin at Deutsche Welle's TV studios in Berlin in October 2010
- Born: Benjamin Dayton Fajzullin; 16 February 1976 (age 50); Brisbane, Queensland, Australia
- Occupations: Journalist, documentary maker, news anchor, reporter, producer, panel moderator, voice-over artist
- Known for: World News Australia, Deutsche Welle

Benjamin Dayton Fajzullin (born 16 February 1976) is a journalist, documentary maker, news anchor, reporter, producer, panel moderator and voice-over artist. He previously presented the national news show World News Australia on SBS television from Sydney. He is based in Berlin, where he is one of the main presenters on DW.

== Early life ==
Fajzullin was born in Brisbane, Queensland, Australia. His family background (he has Tatar, Polish, German and British heritage) sparked his interest in languages and travel. He started in theatre and public speaking at the age of eight and developed a taste for journalism as an editor of his school magazine in his senior year at the Anglican Church Grammar School in 1993. Fajzullin completed an associate diploma in Speech and Drama with Trinity College of Music, London in 1994 and graduated from Queensland University of Technology with a degree in journalism in 1996.

== Career ==
Fajzullin launched his career as a journalist in radio in 1996. He was a reporter and newsreader at Radio 4CC in Gladstone, Radio 4HI in Emerald and Radio 4BC in Brisbane. Fajzullin first moved to Germany in 2000. He reported around Europe for Deutsche Welle Radio in Bonn, where he also hosted the global broadcaster's English-language news and European current-affairs show Inside Europe. He filed business news for Reuters Consumer TV in Frankfurt and Berlin and was a correspondent on the BBC's flagship financial programme, World Business Report. Fajzullin then moved to DW to become a sports presenter on Deutsche Welle-TV. He covered the 2006 FIFA World Cup, reporting live from matches across the country. Fajzullin also voiced reports, produced and presented the German Football League's worldwide TV show, GOAL! The Bundesliga Magazine. He produced and presented two series for German broadcaster ZDF "Auch mein Zuhause" about the challenges facing migrants from various countries, who had made Germany their home, and "Erlebnis Shopping Deutschland" about foreign tourists, who regularly came to Germany to experience German culture and buy German products. Fajzullin was DW's chief business anchor for about 10 years, reporting regularly from the World Economic Forum in Davos, Switzerland, and hosting the weekly business show Made in Germany. He was also the regular host of DW's successful and award-winning daily news show on the coronavirus pandemic COVID-19 Special, for almost two years. Fajzullin rejoined DW's news desk at the end of 2021 as an anchor, and continued to file reports and direct documentaries for DW's news and business departments, including, Open Your Eyes to the UNSEEN: Tech will save us - right?! and Open Your Eyes to the UNSEEN: Mommy I can't breathe, for which Fajzullin was merited with the AIB Award for Best Short Documentary.
