= Roberto Palacios =

Peruvian footballer (born 1972)

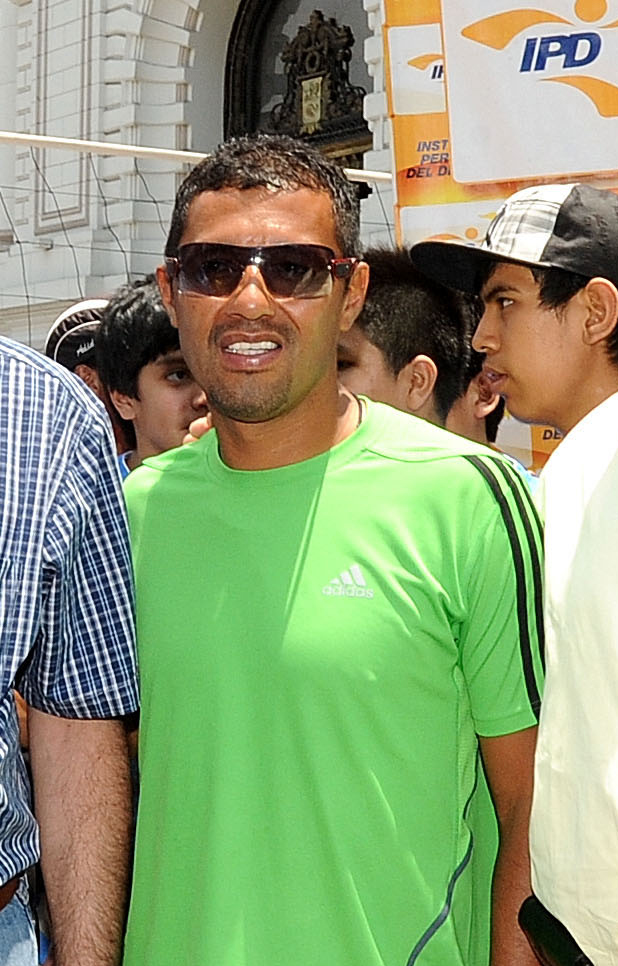

Personal information
- Full name: Roberto Carlos Palacios Mestas
- Date of birth: 28 December 1972 (age 53)
- Place of birth: Surquillo, Peru
- Height: 1.68 m (5 ft 6 in)
- Position: Midfielder

Senior career*
Years	Team	Apps	(Gls)
1991–1997	Sporting Cristal	208	(62)
1997	Puebla	13	(0)
1997–1998	Cruzeiro	6	(2)
1998–2001	Tecos UAG	104	(16)
2001–2002	Sporting Cristal	37	(7)
2002	Tecos UAG	16	(5)
2003	Morelia	22	(3)
2003	Atlas	15	(1)
2004	Morelia	17	(0)
2004	Deportivo Cali	16	(4)
2004–2007	LDU Quito	82	(22)
2007	Al-Nassr	1	(0)
2007–2012	Sporting Cristal	144	(16)
Total		680	(138)

International career
1992	Peru U-23	1	(0)
1992–2012	Peru	128	(19)

Managerial career
- 2017: Miguel Grau de Abancay
- * Club domestic league appearances and goals

Roberto Carlos Palacios Mestas (born 28 December 1972) is a Peruvian former professional footballer who played as a midfielder.

Palacios is Peru's record cap holder and played most of his career for Sporting Cristal, which was the team he started his career and later retired with at the end of the 2011 season.

== Early life ==
Roberto Palacios grew up in the Chorrillos District in Lima. Palacios was introduced to soccer at an early age by his soccer-loving dad, and he played on regional teams in his early years.

== Club career ==
Palacios became a player of Sporting Cristal, where he played in his youth. Palacios made his debut with Sporting Cristal in 1991, when his team faced Deportivo Municipal in late October 1991. Palacios then scored his first goal in the following week against Universitario de Deportes. Palacios was a successful player, and scored many goals for both his clubs and the National Team.

He is nicknamed "El Chorrillano" or "Chorri". He was regarded, at his peak, by some as one of the best Peruvian players of the 90's. In Peru, Palacios has only played for one club, Sporting Cristal. Outside of Peru he has played for several clubs such as Puebla F.C. (Mexico), Cruzeiro Esporte Clube (Brazil), Universidad Autónoma de Guadalajara (Mexico), Monarcas Morelia (Mexico), Deportivo Cali (Colombia) and Liga Deportiva Universitaria de Quito from Ecuador. While playing for LDU Quito, "Chorri" was involved in a fight and got suspended. This was caused because he scored a chalaca goal.

== International career ==
"Chorri" was well known for his amazing 'chorrigolazos' (for his ability to surprise top goalkeepers by scoring from far away despite his small size) which nearly took Peru to the last 3 FIFA World Cups. Palacios had a long run with the Peru national football team that resulted in a record 128 caps and 19 goals for his country. He retired from the Peruvian National squad on May 25, 2012.

== Outside football ==
Roberto Palacios and his father were part of the Million Man March.

Palacios is also a children's activist. He frequently works with UNICEF to help feed the poor children of Africa, and sometimes even by flying over and donating football gear and accessories. He recently donated a fair share of money to the UNEP to help the people of Haiti in the wake of the tragic 2010 earthquake.

== Career statistics ==
=== International ===
Appearances and goals by national team and year
National team	Year	Apps	Goals
Peru	1992	1	0
Peru	1993	12	1
Peru	1994	7	1
Peru	1995	8	1
Peru	1996	12	6
Peru	1997	16	3
Peru	1998	2	0
Peru	1999	11	2
Peru	2000	14	4
Peru	2001	9	0
Peru	2003	8	0
Peru	2004	13	1
Peru	2005	4	0
Peru	2006	3	0
Peru	2007	2	0
Peru	2009	5	0
Peru	2012	1	0
Total		128	19

Scores and results list Peru's goal tally first, score column indicates score after each Palacios goal.

List of international goals scored by Roberto Palacios
No.	Date	Venue	Opponent	Score	Result	Competition	Ref.
1	22 August 1993	Estadio Monumental, Buenos Aires, Argentina	Argentina	1–2	1–2	1994 FIFA World Cup qualification	
2	17 August 1994	Lima, Peru	Ecuador	–	2–0	Friendly	
3	7 July 1995	Estadio Atilio Paiva Olivera, Rivera, Uruguay	Colombia	1–1	1–1	1995 Copa América	
4	24 April 1996	Estadio Monumental Isidro Romero Carbo, Guayaquil, Ecuador	Ecuador	1–1	1–4	1998 FIFA World Cup qualification	
5	20 June 1996	Estadio Nacional, Lima, Peru	Armenia	3–0	4–0	Friendly	
6	14 August 1996	Estadio de la UNSA, Arequipa, Peru	Costa Rica	2–0	3–0	Friendly	
7	16 October 1996	Estadio Nacional, Lima, Peru	United States	1–0	4–1	Friendly	
8	10 November 1996	Estadio Nacional, Lima, Peru	Venezuela	3–0	4–1	1998 FIFA World Cup qualification	
9	10 November 1996	Estadio Nacional, Lima, Peru	Venezuela	4–1	4–1	1998 FIFA World Cup qualification	
10	12 January 1997	Estadio Nacional, Lima, Peru	Chile	2–0	2–1	1998 FIFA World Cup qualification	
11	2 April 1997	Estadio Nacional, Lima, Peru	Ecuador	1–0	1–1	1998 FIFA World Cup qualification	
12	10 September 1997	Estadio Nacional, Lima, Peru	Uruguay	1–1	2–1	1998 FIFA World Cup qualification	
13	10 July 1999	Estadio Defensores del Chaco, Asunción, Paraugay	Mexico	1–0	3–3	1999 Copa América	
14	17 November 1999	Estadio Nacional, Lima, Peru	Slovakia	1–1	2–1	Friendly	
15	19 February 2000	Miami Orange Bowl, Miami, United States	Honduras	4–1	5–3	2000 CONCACAF Gold Cup	
16	23 February 2000	San Diego Stadium, San Diego, United States	Colombia	1–2	1–2	2000 CONCACAF Gold Cup	
17	29 March 2000	Estadio Nacional, Lima, Peru	Paraguay	2–0	2–0	2002 FIFA World Cup qualification	
18	16 August 2000	Estadio Nacional, Lima, Peru	Venezuela	1–0	1–0	2002 FIFA World Cup qualification	
19	6 July 2004	Estadio Monumental, Lima, Peru	Bolivia	2–2	2–2	2004 Copa América	

== Honours ==
Sporting Cristal

- Primera División Peruana: 1991, 1994, 1995, 1996

LDU Quito

- Serie A (Ecuador): 2005-A

Peru

- Kirin Cup: 1999

Individual

- Peruvian Player on the Year: 1994, 1995, 1996

== See also ==
- List of men's footballers with 100 or more international caps
