= Juan Lojas =

Peruvian footballer (born 1989)

Personal information
- Full name: Juan Diego Lojas Solano
- Date of birth: April 23, 1989 (age 37)
- Place of birth: Comas, Peru
- Height: 1.87 m (6 ft 2 in)
- Position: Centre back

Team information
- Current team: Cienciano
- Number: 13

Youth career
- –2003: Deportivo Pesquero
- 2003–2008: Sporting Cristal

Senior career*
Years	Team	Apps	(Gls)
2008–2011	Sporting Cristal	50	(3)
2012	León de Huánuco	25	(2)
2013–2018	Real Garcilaso	144	(11)
2019–	Cienciano	0	(0)
- * Club domestic league appearances and goals as of 00:33, 10 May 2019 (UTC)

Juan Diego Lojas Solano (born April 23, 1989, in Lima, Perú) is a Peruvian footballer who plays as a defender for Cienciano in the Peruvian Segunda División.

== Club career ==
Lojas started his career in Deportivo Pesquero's youth divisions. In 2003, he transferred to Sporting Cristal's youth system. Lojas debuted with Sporting Cristal on April 23 in a match against Cienciano. He scored his first goal in a game versus Sport Boys on December 13, the same day as Sporting Cristal's anniversary.

== International career ==
He has been called up to Peru's Under-15 national team and received a cap for the nation's Under-20's pre-selection squad.
