= Tin Karamatić =

Croatian association football player

Personal information
- Date of birth: 1 March 1993 (age 33)
- Place of birth: Zagreb, Croatia
- Height: 1.90 m (6 ft 3 in)
- Position: Centre back

Team information
- Current team: Jarun

Youth career
- 2007–2011: Dinamo Zagreb

Senior career*
Years	Team	Apps	(Gls)
2012	Inter Zaprešić	2	(0)
2012	Slovan Liberec B	16	(0)
2013	Olhanense		
2014	Universitatea Craiova		
2014	Senec	8	(0)
2015	Farense	5	(0)
2015	Zrinjski Mostar		
2016	Zavrč	9	(0)
2016–2017	Radomlje	26	(2)
2017	Ankaran Hrvatini	9	(0)
2018	Čelik Zenica	29	(0)
2019	Triglav Kranj	9	(1)
2020	SV Horn	4	(0)
2021	Opatija	6	(0)
2021–	Jarun	57	(4)

International career
2010	Croatia U17	1	(0)
2010	Croatia U19	2	(0)
- * Club domestic league appearances and goals as of 19 June 2023

Tin Karamatić (born 1 March 1993) is a Croatian football defender who plays for Croatian club Jarun.

== Club career ==
=== Dinamo Zagreb ===
Starting off in the Dinamo Zagreb youth system, Karamatić moved through the club's ranks, winning league titles and the Croatian Youth Cup along the way.

He was included in the club's first team pre-season training and featured in several friendly matches before deciding in agreement with Dinamo Zagreb to move away to Inter Zaprešić for a better chance at playing first team experience.

=== Inter Zaprešić ===
His time at Inter Zaprešić was difficult because of an injury that kept him away from the football fields for a considerable amount of time. He did manage to be included in the club's squad list once he had returned to full fitness but decided in late 2012 to move to the Czech Republic instead of continuing in the Croatian 1. HNL.

=== Slovan Liberec ===
Once moving to Slovan Liberec Karamatić encountered some bureaucratic issues with his registration but overcame these and regularly played in the Slovan Liberec B team.

=== Olhanense ===
After a successful trial period at the club under the watchful eye of the club's managers, Abel Xavier, then Paulo Alves, in November 2013 Karamatić was signed on a three-year contract which will keep him at the club until 2016. He was, however, only allowed to play in official matches since 1 January 2014 due to registration limitations with the Portuguese Football Federation.

On 23 January 2014 Karamatić played a full 90 minutes for the club in an international friendly match against FC Lokomotiv Moscow.

On 31 January 2014 Tin participated in the 2014 Lunar New Year Cup in Hong Kong where his team finished 2nd. He started both matches of the 4 team tournament which included local team CitizenAA combined with Ecuadorian Serie A team Deportivo Cuenca, J.League team FC Tokyo and Russian Premier League team FC Krylia Sovetov Samara.

Olhanense won the semi-final 5–6 on penalties against FC Tokyo after drawing 1–1 in the regular 90 minutes. Tin played again in the final but saw his team lose 2–0 to Citizen Cuenca United.

=== SV Horn ===
After not playing for most of the 2019–20 season, on 8 August 2020 he joined Austrian club SV Horn.

=== Opatija ===
On 25 January 2021 he joined Croatian newly promoted second division team Opatija.

== International career ==
Karamatić has represented both Croatia U17 and Croatia U19 national teams on various occasions, playing with many of his former Dinamo Zagreb teammates.

== Career statistics ==
As of 13 November 2013

Team	League	Season	League			Cup			Europe			Other Cups			Total		
Team	League	Season	Apps	Goals	Assists	Apps	Goals	Assists	Apps	Goals	Assists	Apps	Goals	Assists	Apps	Goals	Assists
Inter Zaprešić	Prva HNL	2012–13	2	0	0	0	0	0	—			—			2	0	0
Slovan Liberec B	Gambrinus Liga	2012–13	16	0	0	0	0	0	0	0	0	—			16	0	0
Olhanense	Primeira Liga	2014	—	—	—	—	—	—	—			—			—	—	—
Career Total			18	0	0	0	0	0	0	0	0	0	0	0	18	0	0
