= Diego Chávarri =

American soccer player (born 1989)

Personal information
- Full name: Diego Ivan Chavarri Rodriguez
- Date of birth: March 7, 1989 (age 37)
- Place of birth: Queens, New York, United States
- Height: 1.73 m (5 ft 8 in)
- Position: Attacking midfielder

Team information
- Current team: San Simón
- Number: 30

Youth career
- 2004–2008: Sporting Cristal

Senior career*
Years	Team	Apps	(Gls)
2009–2011	Sporting Cristal	17	(2)
2011–2012	Cobresol	12	(4)
2012–2013	Sport Huancayo	1	(0)
2013–	Unión Comercio	20	(3)
2013–2014	→ Gostaresh Foolad	6	(1)
2014	→ San Simón	30	(4)
- * Club domestic league appearances and goals

Diego Ivan Chavarri Rodriguez (born March 7, 1989) is an Peruvian-American soccer player who plays as offensive midfielder and winger for San Simón in the Segunda Division Peruana.

== Profile ==
Diego Chávarri started his playing career at Sporting Cristal's youth divisions. In 2009, he was promoted to Sporting Cristal's first team. He joined Cobresol for the first part of 2012 then joinedSport Huancayo for the latter part of 2012. In early 2013, he signed with Unión Comercio. He joined newly promoted Iran Pro League side Gostaresh Foolad on July 4, 2013.

== International ==
In 2011, he was invited to participate in a United States men's national under-23 soccer team camp but was unable to attend due to injury. Chávarri has announced that he would like to play for the U.S national team.
