= Mary Kostakidis =

Australian journalist

Mary Kostakidis is an Australian journalist, political commentator, and activist. She is the former presenter of primetime weeknight SBS World News Australia, and was the face of SBS over two decades. Kostakidis was a member of the management team that set up and developed SBS Television in 1980 and presented its flagship World News for 20 years, resigning in 2007.

Since leaving SBS, her journalism and activism has spanned geopolitical issues, democracy, and press freedom. Her commentary covers a variety of issues, including the Middle East, national security, intelligence agencies, AUKUS, China, the Russo-Ukraine war, and the failings of mainstream media.

== Early life and education ==
Mary Kostakidis was born in Veria, Greece, and her family migrated to Australia two years later.

Kostakidis attended Fort Street Girls' High School, and the University of Sydney, where she studied Modern Greek, philosophy, French, German and Italian. She was a founding member and first president of the university's Greek Society, SUGS. She completed a Diploma of Education, and was awarded a post-graduate scholarship to study at the Aristotle University of Thessaloniki in Greece.

== Career ==
=== Early career ===
Before joining SBS, Kostakidis worked as a tutor at the University of Sydney, as a research officer for the Departments of Health and Youth and Community Services in New South Wales and as a court interpreter and a translations editor. She has also hosted programmes on ABC Radio stations 2BL and Classic FM.

=== SBS ===
Kostakidis joined SBS as part of the original management team in September 1980 and worked on the development of the Subtitling Unit, its policy, recruitment and training programme. She went on to become Director of Programme Preparation overseeing Subtitling, Censorship and Classification, and a Post Production Unit. In this role she was responsible for the development of censorship and classification and children's programming policies.

Kostakidis moved from management to anchor SBS's flagship evening news in 1988, after presenting the weekend bulletin for 18 months.

In 1994, she hosted the prime time interview program, The Talk Show. Her guests included Paul Keating, John Laws, Cheryl Kernot, Imran Khan, Betty Friedan and Don Dunstan.

After being known as "the face of SBS News" for many years, in her final year she co-hosted the main SBS World News at 6.30 pm weekdays with Stan Grant.

Preceded by George Donikian	SBS World News Australia; Presenter; 1988–2007	Succeeded by co–anchor with Stan Grant

==== Walk-out and legal action ====
In August 2007, Kostakidis walked out of the SBS newsroom over changes she believed undermined SBS standards and over what she claimed was a breach of contract. According to authors Ien Ang, Gay Hawkins and Lamia Dabboussy, Kostakidis was unhappy with "the introduction of advertisements within [news] programs," and her departure "was clearly a big blow to SBS, and signalled for many that the multicultural broadcaster had lost its way."

On 5 October 2007, Kostakidis lodged a statement of claim in the Federal Court of Australia, alleging a breach of contract and contravention of the Trade Practices Act 1975 on the part of SBS. She alleged that she had been bullied by fellow presenter Stan Grant and had been "intimidated and bullied" by SBS managing director Shaun Brown, who was driving change at SBS he believed would result in a wider audience reach and increased revenue. She was represented in court by prominent Melbourne lawyer, Julian Burnside.

The matter was settled out of court. On 23 November 2007, SBS and Kostakidis were reported to have reached an "amicable settlement". The financial details of the settlement were not disclosed.

== Other activities and roles ==
=== Fiction film and TV ===
Kostakidis acted in a children's television series called Five Times Dizzy in 1986. She also appeared in the movies Jindabyne and Look Both Ways as a newsreader.

=== Other roles and memberships ===
In 1989, Kostakidis hosted the Ethnic Business Awards, which highlighted migrant and Indigenous excellence in business. She went on to host the awards again from 1991 to 1994 as well as from 1996 to 1997.

In 1993, she was appointed by prime minister Paul Keating to serve on the Republic Advisory Committee, headed by Malcolm Turnbull.

In 2009 she served on the National Human Rights Consultation Committee, which was chaired by Frank Brennan and included former Australian Federal Police Commissioner Mick Palmer, and barrister Tammy Williams. The Committee inquired into the adequacy of the protection and promotion of human rights in Australia, holding consultations in metropolitan, rural and remote areas across the country.

She chaired the Sydney Peace Foundation (which awards the Sydney Peace Prize) from 2010 until 2011, and worked as an ambassador for Beyond Blue.

== Activism and commentary ==
Kostakidis has a long-standing interest in social justice, press freedom and the public's right to know, and continues to engage in public discourse, delivering lectures, chairing public forums, and contributing editorial opinion articles in the mainstream press and independent online media. Her ongoing commentary covers a variety of issues, including the Middle East, national security, intelligence agencies, AUKUS, China, the Russo-Ukraine war, and the failings of mainstream media.

=== Julian Assange ===
Kostakidis has supported Julian Assange. In 2011, she presented Assange with the Sydney Peace Foundation's Gold Medal for peace with justice. She described WikiLeaks as an "ingenious website that has shifted the power balance between citizen and the state by exposing what governments really get up to in our name". Shecriticised Assange's extradition trial in the UK and the media for a lack of interest in the case.

=== Israel and Palestine conflict ===
In July 2024, the Zionist Federation of Australia (ZFA) lodged a complaint with the Australian Human Rights Commission alleging that Kostakidis breached racial discrimination laws by posting on X a link to a speech by Hezbollah secretary-general Hassan Nasrallah. Kostakidis said "The point of that tweet was to say that Israel is inviting an escalation, it’s inviting retribution because it is conducting a genocide". In March 2025 the ZFA filed an action against her in the Federal Court and the trial was set for late 2026. The ZFA discontinued its lawsuit on 12 September 2026, with no costs awarded to either side.

== Awards ==
- University of NSW, Speech Competition, First Prize, 1972
- University of Salonika, first post graduate scholarship awarded to an Australian student, 1977
- Monash University, Professor John O. Miller Distinguished Achievement Medal, 1999
- University of Sydney, Community Achievement, 2012
- 2026 Gary Webb Freedom of the Press Award, awarded by American investigative news magazine Consortium News
- Serena Shim Award for Uncompromised Integrity in Journalism, 2026
