= Iván Bulos =

Peruvian footballer (born 1993)

Ivan Bulos
Personal information
- Full name: Ivan Bulos Guerrero
- Date of birth: 20 May 1993 (age 33)
- Place of birth: Lima, Peru
- Height: 1.89 m (6 ft 2 in)
- Position: Forward

Team information
- Current team: Sporting Cristal II (manager)

Youth career
- 2004–2010: Regatas Lima

Senior career*
Years	Team	Apps	(Gls)
2011–2012	Sporting Cristal	3	(0)
2012–2015	Standard Liège	0	(0)
2012–2013	→ Sint-Truiden (loan)	7	(0)
2013–2014	→ Universitario (loan)	0	(0)
2015	Deportivo Municipal	23	(9)
2016–2018	O'Higgins	18	(1)
2017–2018	→ Boavista (loan)	18	(2)
2018–2019	Deportivo Municipal	9	(3)
2019	Boavista	0	(0)
2019	Hajduk Split	0	(0)
2020	Sport Boys	0	(0)
2020	Carlos Stein	12	(2)
Total		90	(17)

International career
2011–2013	Peru U20	6	(1)
2015	Peru	2	(0)

Managerial career
- 2022–2024: Sporting Cristal (youth)
- 2024–: Sporting Cristal (assistant)
- 2025–: Sporting Cristal II
- 2026: Sporting Cristal (interim)
- * Club domestic league appearances and goals

Iván Bulos Guerrero (born 20 May 1993) is Peruvian football manager and former player who played as a forward. He is the current manager of Sporting Cristal II.

== Club career ==
Bulos started his career at the Regatas Lima youth team. In 2010, he was very close to sign with Club Atlético Banfield and Alianza Lima though he moved to Sporting Cristal. He played his first professional match in the Peruvian Primera División on 30 July 2012, a loss against FBC Melgar, substituting Tarek Carranza on minute 88. On 11 July 2015, he joined in O'Higgins starting on the 2015–16 season. On 9 July 2019, he rejoined Boavista after previously being on loan.

On 17 February 2020, Bulos returned to Peru and joined Sport Boys on a deal until June 2020. However, in the beginning of March 2020, it was confirmed that Bulos suffered from osteochondritis dissecans and was set to be out for 6–8 months, which would prevent him from playing for the rest of 2020. Also, his contract was to expire in June 2020. Bulos had similar injuries in his time in both Portugal and Croatia. Bulos ended his career after fifth knee operation to protect his health.

== International career ==
Bulos played for the Peru U20 national team at the 2013 South American Youth Championship. He scored in his first match, a tie against Chile on 11 April 2012.
