= Mike Tomalaris =

Australian sports broadcaster

- Born: Australia
- Occupations: TV anchor and sports reporter for SBS (1987–2021); Football commentator (1987–present); Cycling analyst (1992–present)
- Employer: Special Broadcasting Service

Michael Tomalaris is an Australian television reporter and presenter. He was previously host of SBS Television sports programs including its Tour de France coverage. He was also formerly a presenter for SBS World News.

== Career ==
A print journalist by training, Tomalaris got his break in television in 1987 when Les Murray asked him to provide commentary for a National Soccer League match. Tomalaris joined SBS full-time in 1992 and became a recognised commentator of matches involving the NSL, Socceroos and Olyroos.

He went on to work as a reporter/commentator for SBS at the 1992 and 1996 UEFA European Football Championship and the 1994, 1998, 2002, 2006 and 2010 FIFA World Cup, and was known for developing the network's Tour de France coverage. He was recognised by the Australian Sports Commission for "Most Outstanding Contribution to a Sport by an Individual" at its 2011 awards.

Through SBS he raised cycling's profile in Australia by covering the now defunct Commonwealth Bank Cycle Classic from 1992 and, in 1996, the start of the Tour de France in the Netherlands.

He covered every Tour de France for SBS until 2021, and was the network's main anchor of its international cycling coverage: the Tour Down Under, the Giro d'Italia, the Vuelta a España the Tour of California and Paris–Roubaix. SBS covered the Tour of Flanders live for the first time in 2011. On Sunday afternoons, Tomalaris hosted Cycling Central – the only such program dedicated to the sport. SBS received three Logie nominations for "Best Sport Coverage", for its coverage of the Tour de France.

Tomalaris covered the 2006 FIFA World Cup and was part of the presentation team for SBS's complementary coverage of the Athens Olympic Games in 2004 and Beijing Olympics in 2008.

He was a member of the nightly SBS World News team for several years, sharing the duties with Craig Foster. As one of the hosts for the network's coverage of the 2010 FIFA World Cup, he covered every FIFA World Cup for the network either as a reporter or presenter, from 1994 until his sacking in 2021.

In July 2011, SBS enjoyed record viewing numbers as a result of Cadel Evans becoming the first Australian to win the Tour de France. In 2014, SBS was one of four free-to-air television networks in the world to broadcast every stage of the Giro d'Italia.

Tomalaris instigated and supported an annual charity bicycle ride, The Johnny Warren Jamberoo Classic, in honour of his former colleague and Socceroos captain Johnny Warren (1943–2004) to raise funds for Chris O'Brien's Lifehouse at Sydney's Royal Prince Alfred Hospital.

Tomalaris is a keen cyclist and is patron and member of the Sydney Uni Velo Club.

In 2021, Tomalaris was sacked from SBS. In an interview with The Sydney Morning Herald, Tomalaris said of his dismissal: "It was a minor mistake and it wasn’t a hanging offence."
