= Gianfranco Espejo =

Peruvian footballer (1988-2011)

Personal information
- Full name: Gianfranco Renato Espejo Reyes
- Date of birth: 4 March 1988
- Place of birth: Lima, Peru
- Date of death: 4 June 2011 (aged 23)
- Place of death: Tumbes, Peru
- Height: 1.85 m (6 ft 1 in)
- Position: Midfielder

Senior career*
Years	Team	Apps	(Gls)
2006–2008	Sporting Cristal	23	(2)
2009–2010	Juan Aurich	57	(9)
2011	Sporting Cristal	6	(0)

International career
2007	Peru	1	(0)
2007	Peru U-20		
- * Club domestic league appearances and goals

Gianfranco Renato Espejo Reyes (4 March 1988 – 4 June 2011) was a Peruvian footballer who played as a midfielder for Sporting Cristal and Juan Aurich.

== Club career ==
He rejoined Cristal from Juan Aurich in January 2011.

== Personal life ==
=== Death ===
Espejo died in a traffic accident on 4 June 2011.
