= José Granda (footballer, born 1992) =

Peruvian footballer

Personal information
- Full name: José Luis Granda Bravo
- Date of birth: 13 April 1992 (age 34)
- Place of birth: Lima, Peru
- Height: 1.78 m (5 ft 10 in)
- Position: Centre back

Team information
- Current team: Alfonso Ugarte

Senior career*
Years	Team	Apps	(Gls)
2010–2012	Sporting Cristal	16	(1)
2012–2014	Real Garcilaso	9	(0)
2014	UT Cajamarca	20	(2)
2015	León de Huánuco	11	(0)
2016	Sport Loreto	26	(0)
2017	Deportivo Coopsol	23	(2)
2018	Alfonso Ugarte		
2019	San Cristóbal		
2020–	Alfonso Ugarte		
- * Club domestic league appearances and goals as of 8 December 2012

José Luis Granda Bravo (born 13 April 1992) is a Peruvian footballer. He currently plays for Alfonso Ugarte.

== Club career ==
José Granda began his senior career with Sporting Cristal, joining their first team in January 2010. He made his Torneo Descentralizado league debut on 20 February 2010 playing the entire match in Cristal's 3–1 home win over FBC Melgar. He played from start again in his second league match in the 1–0 win over Total Chalaco on matchday 13. Granda made only five league appearances in his debut season under manager Víctor Rivera.

The following season, he made ten league appearances for Cristal. In the 2012 season he only featured in one match, scoring his first league goal in the 1–2 away win over FBC Melgar.

Then in August 2012 Granda joined newly promoted side Real Garcilaso.

In February 2018, Granda moved to Alfonso Ugarte. After a year in San Cristóbal, Granda re-joined Alfonso Ugarte in March 2020.
