= Mahamet Diagouraga =

Footballer (born 1984)

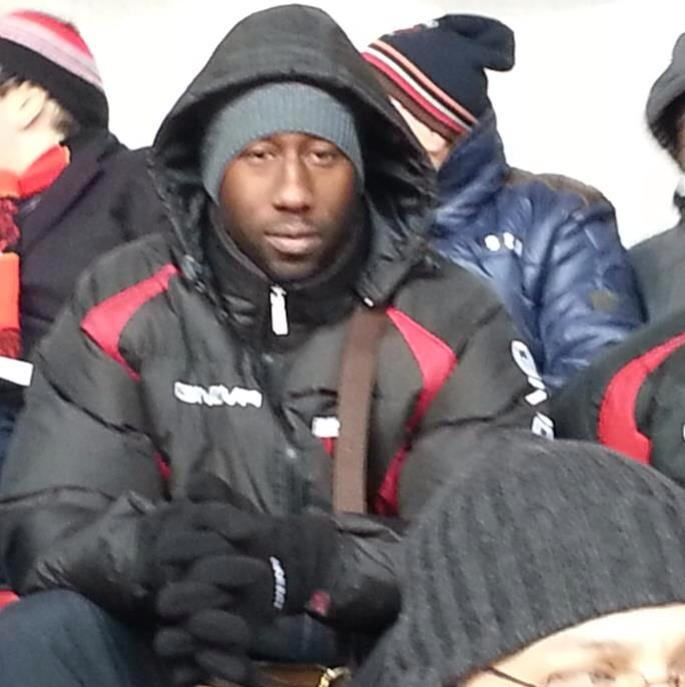
- Diagouraga in 2013

Personal information
- Full name: Mahamet Diagouraga
- Date of birth: January 8, 1984 (age 42)
- Place of birth: Corbeil-Essonnes, France
- Height: 1.88 m (6 ft 2 in)
- Position: Defender

Youth career
- 2001–2002: Bologna
- 2002–2004: Chievo

Senior career*
Years	Team	Apps	(Gls)
2004–2005	Gualdo	23	(0)
2005–2006	Chievo	0	(0)
2005–2006	→ SPAL (loan)	23	(1)
2006–2007	Sambenedettese	23	(0)
2007–2008	Massese	27	(0)
2008–2012	Modena	103	(1)
2013	Carpi	0	(0)
2013	Nocerina	4	(0)
2014–2017	Sénart-Moissy	32	(0)
Total		235	(2)

International career
2003	Mali U20		
- * Club domestic league appearances and goals

Mahamet Diagouraga (born 8 January 1984) is a former professional footballer who played as a defender. Born in France, he is a former Mali youth international.

== Career ==
Diagouraga was signed form Bologna in summer 2002. He was farmed to Serie C1 and Serie C2 clubs from Chievo since 2004. During on loan at Gualdo, Sambenedettese and Massese, the clubs also holds half of ownership.

In summer 2008, he joined Modena on loan, from Chievo. In summer 2009 Modena acquired half of the registration rights for €230,000. In June 2011 Chievo gave up the remain rights for free and signed keeper Marco Silvestri.
