= Lee Lin Chin =

Australian journalist

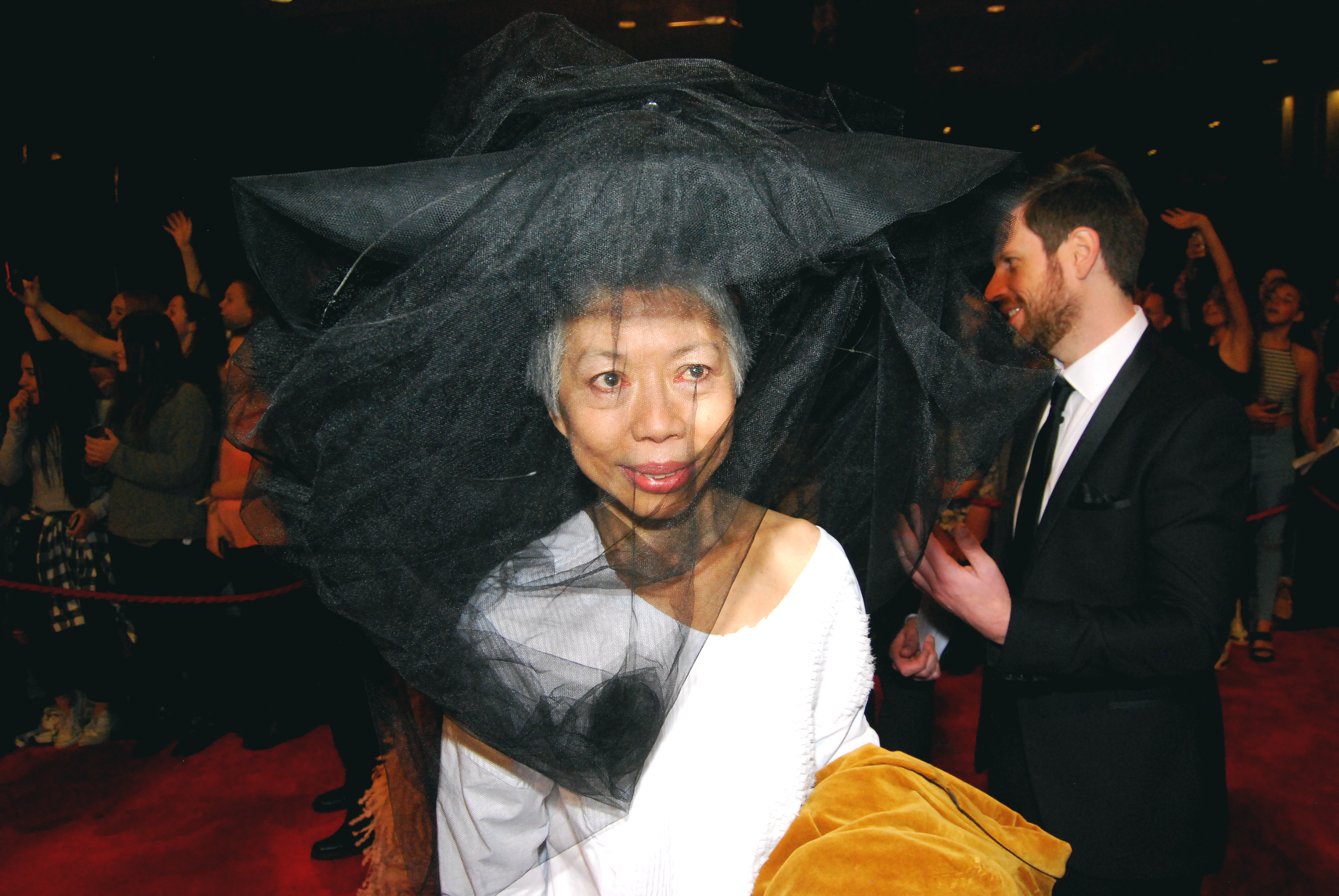
- Born: 1953 (age 72–73); Jakarta, Indonesia
- Citizenship: Australian
- Education: St. Margaret's Secondary School
- Occupations: Television news presenter; Radio presenter; Translator; Journalist; Fashionista
- Years active: 1968–2018
- Known for: SBS World News Presenter (1992–2018)
- Notable work: Iced Beer and Other Tantalising Tips for Life ISBN 9780143783657
- Television: SBS World News; The Feed; Fashionista; Celebrity Chin Wag; Broadcast Battleground; The Weekend Shift

Lee Lin Chin (born 1953) is an Indonesian-born Australian television, radio presenter and journalist. She is best known for her association with the Special Broadcasting Service (SBS) network, and presented SBS World News on weekends.

Lee Lin has been a news presenter and journalist since the late 1960s.

In 2016, she was nominated for the Gold Logie becoming the first SBS personality to be nominated for the award in the station's 36-year run.

== Early life ==
Chin was born in Jakarta, Indonesia to Chinese parents and grew up in Singapore, where her media career began in television and radio in 1968.

== Media career in Australia ==
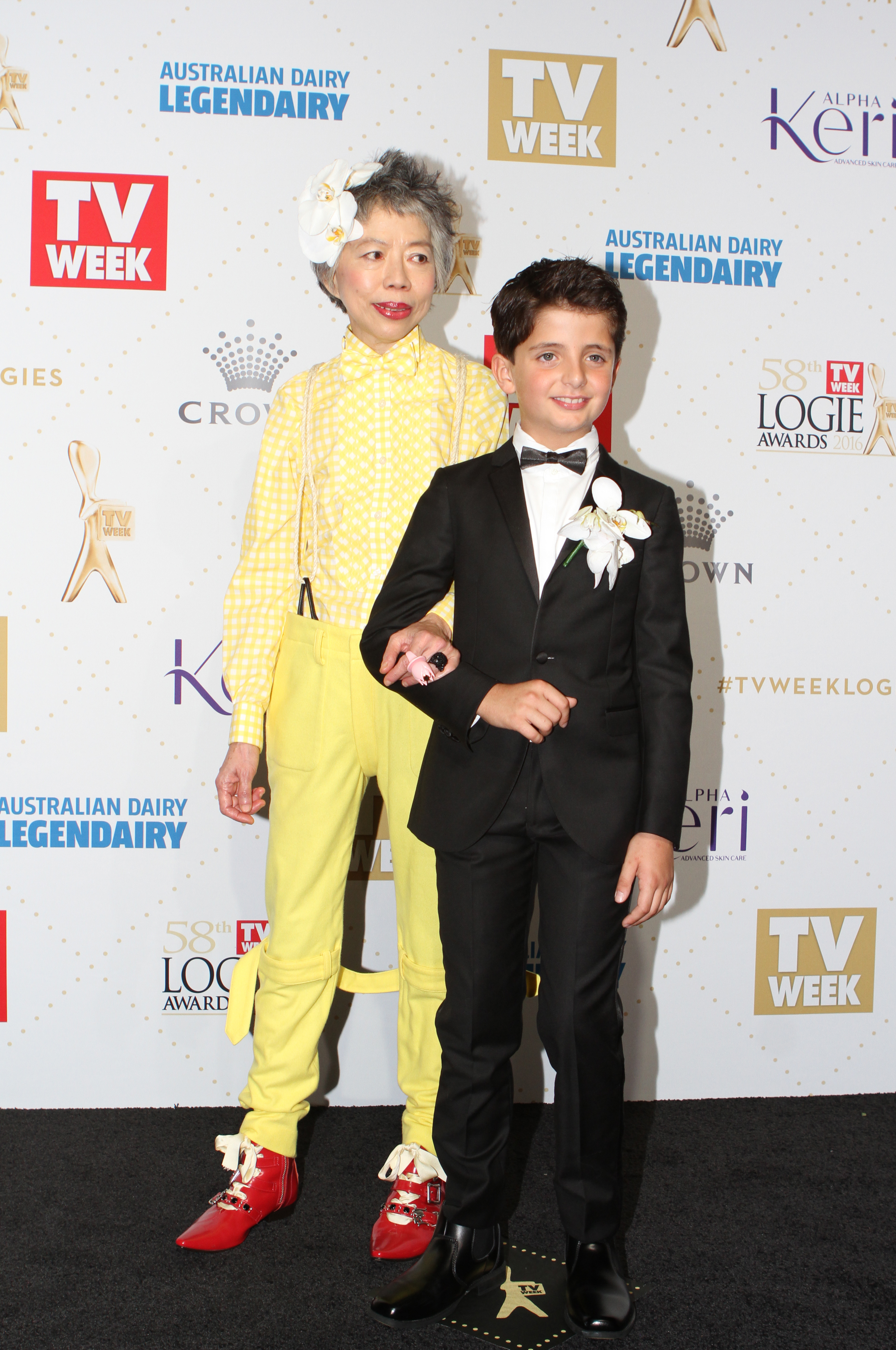
Lee Lin Chin, at the Logies. Chin's eccentric style has led her to somewhat of an iconic status.

She migrated to Australia in 1980 where she began working for SBS TV as a translator for Chinese language films. She moved to ABC Radio in both Newcastle and Darwin. In 1987, she moved to SBS World News, presenting the weekend news, where she remained until her retirement in 2018.

She has also starred in a minor role as a newsreader in the independent Australian movie Resistance by Hugh Keays-Byrne. She also had a small role, playing a Thai interpreter, in the 1989 Australian mini-series Bangkok Hilton, with Nicole Kidman.

In 2014, she began working for SBS's The Feed, creating small segments where she presents small comedy segments including "Pranked with Lee Lin Chin", "Lee Lin Chin Versus Maggie Beer", "Celebrity Chin Wag", comedic cooking show "Lee Linguine" and most recently "The Real Newsreaders of Sydney" with fellow newsreaders Sandra Sully and Natalie Barr.

On 18 May 2015, she was announced to be Australia's spokesperson for the 2015 Eurovision Song Contest. She gave the twelve points to the eventual winner, Sweden's Måns Zelmerlöw and his song "Heroes". She returned to this role in 2016 and gave twelve points to Belgium's Laura Tesoro and her song "What's the Pressure", and also the following year, where the twelve points were awarded to the United Kingdom's Lucie Jones with her song "Never Give Up On You". In 2018, she was replaced in this role by Ricardo Goncalves.

On 6 August 2015, The Sydney Morning Herald revealed that the tweets posted on her official Twitter account were ghostwritten by comedian Chris Leben, head comedy writer for The Feed.

Her 'Chinspirational' book, Iced Beer and Other Tantalising Tips for Life, co-written with Chris Leben, was published in 2016.

In July 2018, she announced her resignation stating that "...working two days a week didn't give me enough time to devote to the pub and re-reading the complete works of Shakespeare. So now that I work zero days that issue has been addressed." She later revealed that in her resignation letter, she stated that the reason behind her departure was due to systemic workplace issues at the broadcaster including a lack of diversity in management and their "lack of consideration and common human respect" for staff.

In October 2018, she was placed number 74 on Maxim magazine's Hot 100 list.

== Personal life ==
Chin speaks conversational Cantonese, Mandarin and Hokkien.
