= Stan Grant (journalist) =

Australian journalist (born 1963)

Stan Grant FASSA
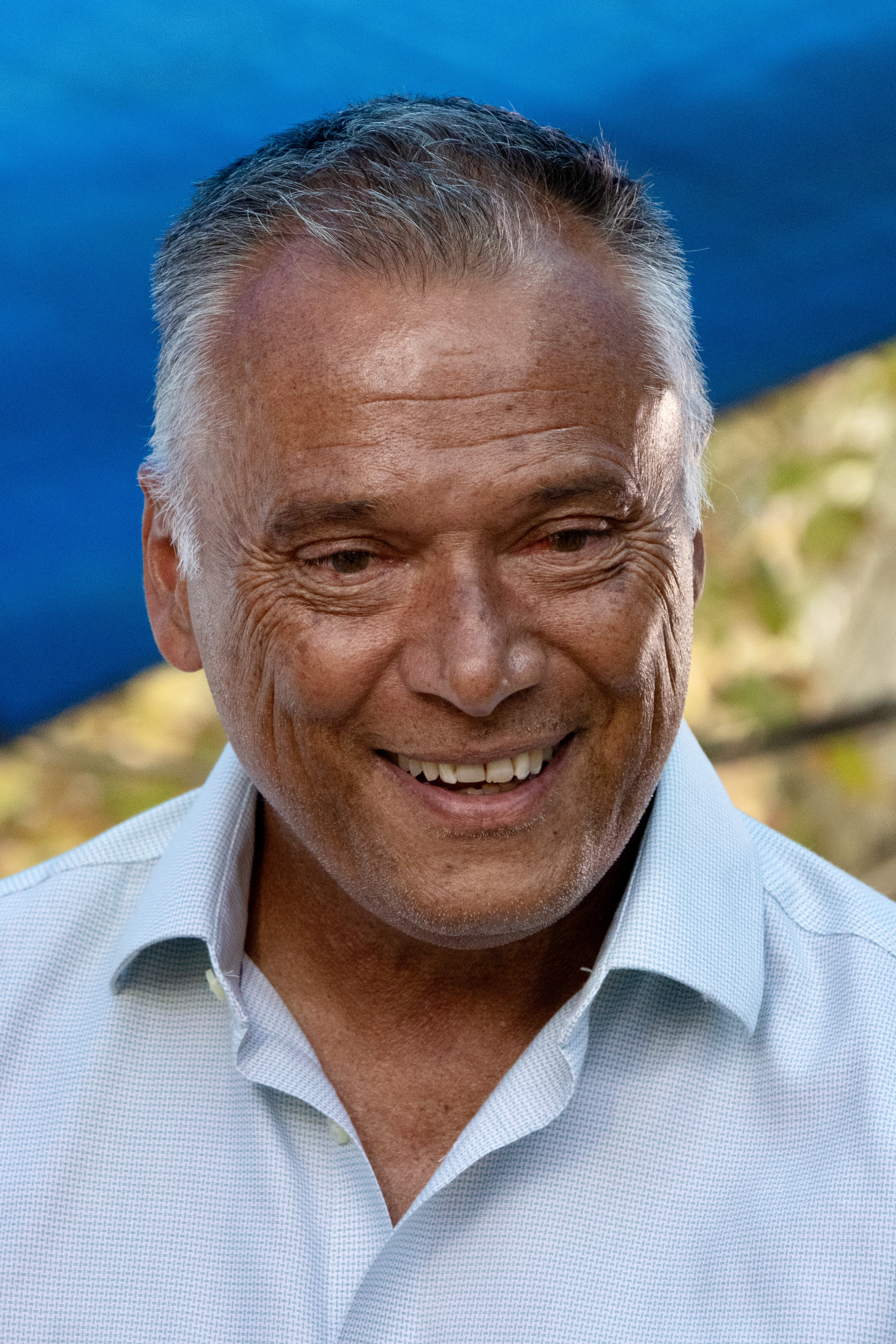
- Grant in 2025
- Born: 30 September 1963 (age 63); Griffith, New South Wales, Australia
- Occupations: Radio and TV presenter; journalist; writer; lecturer
- Years active: 1986–present
- Notable credit(s): Real Life host (1992–1994); CNN anchor (2000–2007, 2009–2013); Reporting Live (2013–2016); Matter of Fact (2018)
- Spouses: Karla Grant (m. 1984; div. 2000) Tracey Holmes (m. 2000)
- Children: 3 with K. Grant; 1 with Holmes
- Parent(s): Stan Grant Sr; Elizabeth Cameron

Stan Grant (born 30 September 1963) is an Australian as well as a Wiradjuri, Kamilaroi and Dharawal man who had been a journalist, writer, radio and television presenter and theologian. He has written and spoken on Indigenous issues and his Aboriginal identity.

== Early life and education ==
Grant was born on 30 September 1963 in Griffith, New South Wales, the son of Stan Grant Sr, an elder of the Wiradjuri people and Elizabeth Grant (née Cameron), born near Coonabarabran, the daughter of a white woman and a Kamilaroi Aboriginal man. The Wiradjuri are an Aboriginal Australian people from the south-west inland region of New South Wales. He spent much of his childhood in inner Victoria, where the Wiradjuri people also have roots.

== Career ==
=== Journalism ===
Grant has more than 30 years of experience working in broadcast radio and television news and current affairs. He spent several years as a news presenter on the Australian Macquarie Radio Network, Seven, SBS, along with a long-term stint at CNN International as a Senior International Correspondent in Abu Dhabi, Hong Kong and Beijing, before starting with the Australian Broadcasting Corporation (ABC).

==== 1990s–2012 ====
In 1994, as host of the Seven Network current affairs programme Real Life Grant won the Logie Award for Most Popular Current Affairs Programme.

In 2007 he took on the role of co-presenter of the one-hour 6:30 pm SBS World News bulletin, and also presented ABC Local Radio's Indigenous programme Speaking Out. In December 2007, Grant resigned from SBS World News and was replaced by Anton Enus.

In 2009 Grant was appointed UAE correspondent for CNN. Based in CNN's new Abu Dhabi news-gathering and production centre, Grant covered stories from both the UAE and the surrounding region and hosted the programme Prism.

==== 2012: NITV and pay TV ====
Grant returned to Australia in 2012 to help launch SBS' new National Indigenous Television (NITV) channel, and in 2013 hosted a nightly late night news programme NewsNight for Sky News Australia, which aired weeknights at 11 pm. From 2014 he started hosting Sky News Australia's Reporting Live with Stan Grant at 6 pm, a nightly news programme reporting on the serious news stories of the day, and in April of that year he hosted Crimes that Shook Australia, a six-part television drama series broadcast on Foxtel.

==== 2015: Racism speech ====
In 2015 Grant took part in a public debate at the IQ2 stage of The Ethics Centre, with immigration lawyer Pallavi Sinha, Herald Sun columnist Rita Panahi and actor Jack Thompson to argue for or against the topic "Racism is destroying the Australian dream". He told of the impact of colonisation on Indigenous Australians, past and present. He argued that "the Australian Dream" was based upon racism, mentioning his ancestors and others who were forced into institutions and unpaid work. The debate itself was a finalist in the United Nations Association of Australia Media Peace Awards for "its role in stimulating public awareness and understanding".

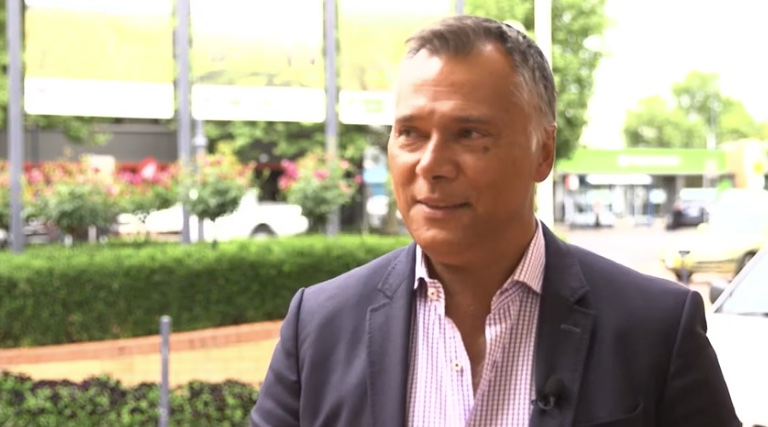
Stan Grant interviewed on the importance of storytelling and place

==== 2017–2023 ====
In 2017, Grant joined the ABC as editor of Indigenous Affairs and fill-in host of nightly current affairs programme 7.30. Grant also hosted The Link, which aired on Friday nights.

In 2018 Grant started hosting a flagship national night current affairs programme, Matter of Fact, on the ABC News TV Channel and ABC News Radio. He was also appointed chief Asia correspondent for the ABC News Network. The program was cancelled after 10 months, ending on 29 November 2018, after which time he took up the new role of Indigenous and International Affairs Analyst with the ABC, concurrently with a professorship at Griffith University.

In 2019 Grant moved to Doha, capital city of Qatar, to start work with Al Jazeera English.

In September 2020, it was announced that Grant would become the ABC's International Affairs Analyst with the broadcaster noting his past journalistic experience in China affairs. This was notable as the ABC reporters working in China, Bill Birtles and Mike Smith, were removed from China by the Australian Broadcasting Corporation on advice from the Australian Security Intelligence Organisation, Australia's chief spy agency; the evacuation of the reporters led to a short diplomatic standoff.

In December 2020, Grant hosted a series of episodes about identity for the ABC's long form interview program One Plus One.

In 2021, Grant launched the ABC's China Tonight program – looking at Chinese culture and politics for an Australian audience.

In July 2022, it was announced that Grant will permanently host Q+A from 1 August. In May 2023, Grant resigned from the show after an escalation of racial abuse that occurred following his participation in the ABC's coverage of King Charles III's coronation.

==== 2023: Media and social media ====
In May 2023, Grant was invited by the ABC to be a commentator for the coverage of the Coronation of Charles III and Camilla on 6 May 2023. During the programme, he commented that the Crown "represented the invasion, the theft of land – and in our case – the exterminating war". Subsequently, he expanded on these comments stating: "In the name of the crown my people were segregated on missions and reserves. Police wearing the seal of the crown took children from their families. Under the crown our people were massacred." These comments were criticised by some in the media and community, resulting in a social media commentary that Grant described as "a sordid spectacle. A grotesque burlesque. Lives are reduced to mockery and ridicule." Grant was subject to abuse in the media that caused him to comment on Q&A on 15 May 2023 that he would leave the show at least temporarily after the next episode on 22 May. Grant made a speech at the end of the 22 May show, stating that his would be leaving, not directly due to the racial abuse, but due to feeling that the media itself was the problem as "Too often, we are the poison in the bloodstream of our society." He also accused the ABC of "institutional failure" and that it had failed to publicly defend him. He was supported by hundreds of ABC staff around the country walking out of office in support of Grant. Many carried signs saying, "I stand with Stan". ABC news director Justin Stevens told a crowd of hundreds outside the organisation's Sydney headquarters "enough is enough. The line in the sand is here, and we will not tolerate our staff being subjected to racial abuse, or any form of abuse. It must stop."

Later in 2024, Grant joined The Saturday Paper as a columnist.

=== Academia ===
In October 2018 Grant was appointed Professor of Global Affairs at Griffith University. In April 2020 he was appointed Vice-Chancellor's Chair of Australian-Indigenous Belonging at Charles Sturt University, a position he still holds as of October 2022. He was elected a fellow of the Academy of the Social Sciences in Australia in 2023. In 2024, he completed his PhD at Charles Sturt University, with a dissertation titled "Yindyamarra as theology: identity, history, violence, faith and reconciliation."

== Other activities and roles ==
=== Politics ===
During early 2016 Grant was talked about as running in the 2016 Australian federal election. Grant ruled out running for the National Party of Australia and said he was not "ideologically bound to the left" and that he admired people with the "small-l liberal" approach".

In mid-March, nine weeks before the 2019 Australian federal election, Grant was asked by the Prime Minister Scott Morrison to a meeting at Kirribilli House. While there he was asked to run for the Liberal Party of Australia, but turned down the offer, saying "It was an honour to be asked by the Prime Minister, but in the end that role is just not for me. I like what I am doing now, totally independently, and I don't have to make my views fit within a party framework."

=== Film ===
Grant wrote, and features in, the full-length documentary film The Australian Dream, released in 2019, the title of which echoes that of his address at the IQ2 debate. The film looks at the part played by racism in the demonisation of Australian rules football-player Adam Goodes. It won the AACTA Award for best feature documentary in the 2019 series and the 2019 Walkley Documentary Award.

In 2021 he was appointed as one of three Indigenous ambassadors to the SmartFone Flick Fest, along with actor and filmmaker Wayne Blair and screenwriter Jon Bell.

=== Other ===
Grant has been an ambassador of the Australian Indigenous Education Foundation since 2017.

He was a senior fellow during the 2019–20 financial year at the Australian Strategic Policy Institute.

Grant gave the Eddie Koiki Mabo Lecture at James Cook University in Townsville on Mabo Day, 3 June 2022, the 30th anniversary of the Mabo case, which first recognised native title under Australian common law. On 30 October 2023 he gave the JG Crawford Oration at the Australian National University Crawford Leadership Forum.

== Selected publications ==
- The Tears of Strangers (2004): A memoir that details the political and social changes of Indigenous Australians over the period of 40 years, focusing particularly on generations of the Wiradjuri people.
- Talking to My Country (2016): The origins of the book came from the abuse of Adam Goodes in 2015. In a review for The Saturday Paper, Talking to My Country was described as "Australia viewed from the riverbank on the edge of town; great affection mixed with discomfort about [the national anthem] 'Advance Australia Fair'".
- The Australian Dream: Blood, History and Becoming (2016): was published in the Quarterly Essay, November 2016 by Black Inc.
- Australia Day (2018): a follow-up to Talking to My Country about what it means to be Australian.
- On Identity (2020): was published in both English and Wiradjuri in 2019, in hardcopy and as an e-book. In it Grant "asks why when it comes to identity he is asked to choose between black and white", and "argues that it is time to leave identity behind and to embrace cosmopolitanism" (catalogue blurb).
- Tell it to the World: An Indigenous Memoir (2019) was published in the US.
- Indigenous Australia for Dummies (2021); Larissa Behrendt and Stan Grant
- With the Falling of the Dusk (2021) subtitled A chronicle of the world in crisis.
- On Thomas Keneally: Writers on Writers (2021)
- A Collection of Interviews from One Plus One; ABC Audio
- The Queen is Dead: The Time has Come for a Reckoning (2023)
- Murriyang: Song of Time; Simon and Schuster (2024)
- When Words Fail Us – Truth Beyond Time. NewSouth Publishing. 2026. ISBN 978-1761170751.

== Awards ==
As of February 2020, Grant has won the following awards:

- Peabody Award (US)
- DuPont Award (US)
- Asian TV Awards (four times)
- Walkley Award (three times), including the 2016 Walkley Book Award
- The Australian Dream won the AACTA Award for best feature documentary film in the 2019 series and the 2019 Walkley Documentary Award

== Personal life ==
Grant was married to Karla Grant with whom he has a daughter and two sons. A well publicised marriage break-up in 2000, prior to the Sydney Olympic Games, resulted from his starting a relationship with fellow TV journalist Tracey Holmes. After criticism from News Corporation tabloids, while News Corporation was involved in the C7 Sport dispute with Seven, his employment at the Seven Network was terminated as a result, and he and Holmes moved to Hong Kong with CNN. They were there for two years with their baby son, before moving to Beijing in mainland China with CNN, totalling 14 years in Asia.
