= Reporting Live =

2013–2016 Australian television series

- Title card of Reporting Live
- Also known as: NewsNight; Reporting LIVE with Stan Grant
- Genre: News, current affairs, commentary
- Presented by: Stan Grant
- Country of origin: Australia
- Original language: English
- No. of seasons: 4

Production
- Running time: 1 hour (2013 – May 2015); 2 hours (June 2015 – 2016); 1 hour (2016–present) (all inc. adverts)

Original release
- Network: Sky News Australia
- Release: 28 January 2013 – 21 April 2016 (enters hiatus)

Reporting Live (sometimes stylised as Reporting LIVE with Stan Grant and formerly known as NewsNight) is an Australian television news and commentary program broadcast four times weekly on Sky News Australia. Hosted by Sky News international editor Stan Grant, it first premiered as NewsNight on 28 January 2013 at 11 pm AEST, with a focus on international affairs. The program covers a range of news, as well as interviews conducted by Grant, with a "special focus on world affairs and in particular the Asian region".

The program rebranded as Reporting Live from 20 January 2014 and moved to the earlier timeslot of 6 pm AEST, competing against networked Seven News and Nine News bulletins in the timeslot. It returned for a third season in 2015 and was expanded to two hours in duration from 1 June 2015, following the move of PVO NewsHour from the 7 pm AEST timetslot.

The program returned for a fourth season in 2016, but was reduced to a single hour to accommodate the launch of The Latest with Laura Jayes launching at 7pm AEST. Grant took extended leave from Sky News in March, with Jim Middleton and Helen Dalley among those filling in as anchor.

It was subsequently announced that Reporting Live would go on hiatus from May 2016, later brought forward to late April. The Latest took over the timeslot, itself moved to accommodate the relaunch of The Bolt Report. It was reported that Grant was "winding back his duties" at Sky News in August 2016, suggesting the program may not return.

The program is broadcast from the Sky News centre in the Sydney suburb of Macquarie Park.
