= Tracey Holmes =

Australian journalist

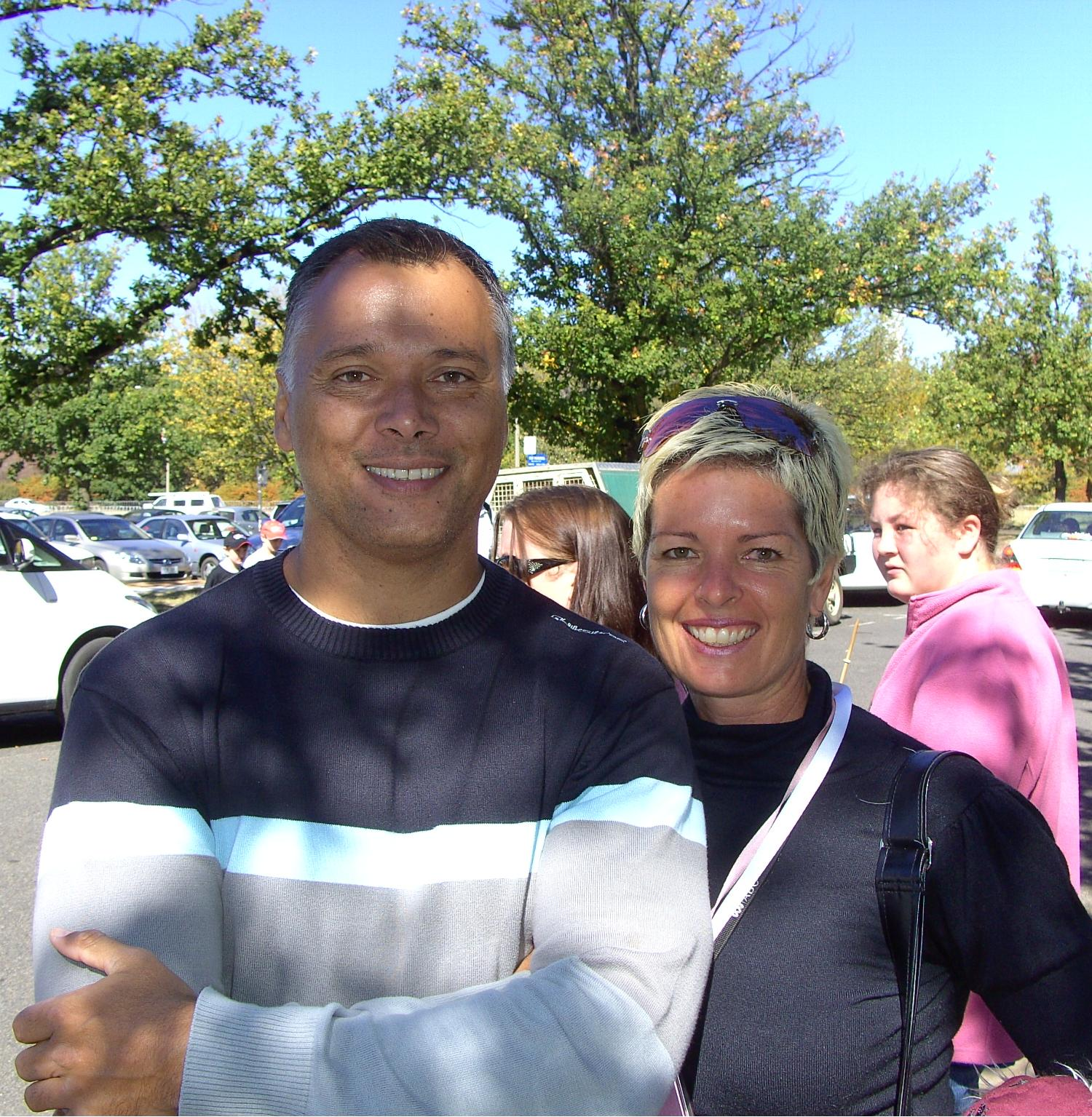
- Holmes and husband Stan Grant in 2008
- Born: 5 April 1966 (age 60)
- Occupation: Journalist
- Years active: 1989−present
- Spouse: Stan Grant
- Children: 3

Tracey Holmes (born 5 April 1966), an Australian journalist, is a presenter on ABC NewsRadio, since January 2014, with an extensive career in television and radio, specialising predominantly in sport.

== Career ==
Born 1966 in Sydney to a surfing family Holmes began her work in 1989 as a journalist at the Australian Broadcasting Corporation and was Australia's first female host of a national sports programme, Grandstand. From 1996 to 1998, she worked as a media spokesperson for the Sydney Organising Committee for the Olympic Games (SOCOG). In 1998, she co-hosted SBS' presentation of the FIFA World Cup. She appeared on the nightly World Cup Show during the 2006 FIFA World Cup in Germany.

From 1998 to 2000, she worked as a sports presenter for television station Channel Seven. Her contract was terminated amid some controversy in mid-2000. Holmes then moved overseas with her husband, journalist Stan Grant, and worked as a sports broadcaster in Hong Kong and Beijing.

In 2006, Holmes returned to Sydney. She acted as fill-in presenter for Richard Glover's radio drive program on 702 ABC Sydney during the 2006/2007 summer break. In February 2007, Holmes was re-appointed as the ABC Radio Grandstand announcer, taking over from Simone Thurtell who moved to 1233 ABC Newcastle as Drive presenter.

Holmes returned to the ABC in 2014, as a news anchor on ABC NewsRadio.

In 2021, Holmes was at the 2020 Summer Olympics, and filing stories for ABC News Online and interviews on ABC Radio in Australia.

In October 2023, Holmes announced her resignation from ABC ending her time with the broadcaster on 30 November. She has been a Professorial Fellow in Sport at the University of Canberra.

== Personal life ==
Holmes started a relationship with Stan Grant in 2000, and this caused them to leave Channel 7. In the next year, they had a son, Jesse, and soon afterward Grant was offered a broadcasting position with CNN in Hong Kong. It was there that Holmes studied Buddhism. Two years later, Grant was offered a CNN correspondent position in Beijing and they moved to mainland China.

In the late 2010s, Holmes was made aware of how her maternal great-great-grandfather was a Joseph Lin, a doctor of Chinese medicine, who had moved to Australia from Amoi in Fujian Province in the 1850s, to serve the needs of Chinese gold miners at Cooma in southern New South Wales. He later settled in Gundagai (coincidentally, Grant's tribal Wiradjuri country) with an Anglo wife, Elizabeth (née Wood), having three children.

When their Chinese family name caused teasing of the children, the name was changed to Holmes, the name of Elizabeth's first husband who had died. Holmes and Grant have claimed that people in China looked at their son, Jesse, and noted Chinese facial features.
