= Apollon Lemondzhava =

Russian footballer

Personal information
- Full name: Apollon Dimitrievich Lemondzhava
- Date of birth: March 2, 1991 (age 35)
- Place of birth: Sukhumi, Georgia
- Positions: Midfielder; forward

Senior career*
Years	Team	Apps	(Gls)
2012–2013	FK Rudar Prijedor	10	(1)
2013–2014	FC Lienden	9	(0)
2015–2016	HNK Gorica	6	(1)
- FC Rosich
- * Club domestic league appearances and goals

Apollon Dimitrievich Lemondzhava (Georgian: აპოლონ ლემონჯავა; Russian: Аполлон Лемонджава; born 2 March 1991 in Georgia) is a Russian retired footballer.

== Career ==
By 2011, Lemondzhava trialed with Schalke 04 in Germany, Vitesse in the Netherlands, FK Partizan in Serbia, Olympique de Marseille and Girondins de Bordeaux in France, and Atalanta in Italy.

In 2012, he signed for Bosnian top flight side FK Rudar Prijedor, where he made 10 league appearances and scored 1 goal. After that, Lemondzhava played for Dutch fourth division club Lienden and Croatian second division outfit HNK Gorica before joining Russian amateurs Rosich.

In 2015, he trialed with Persib Bandung, the most successful Indonesian team.

Lemondzhava is eligible to represent both the Russian and Georgian national teams.
