= Alejandro Frezzotti =

Argentine footballer

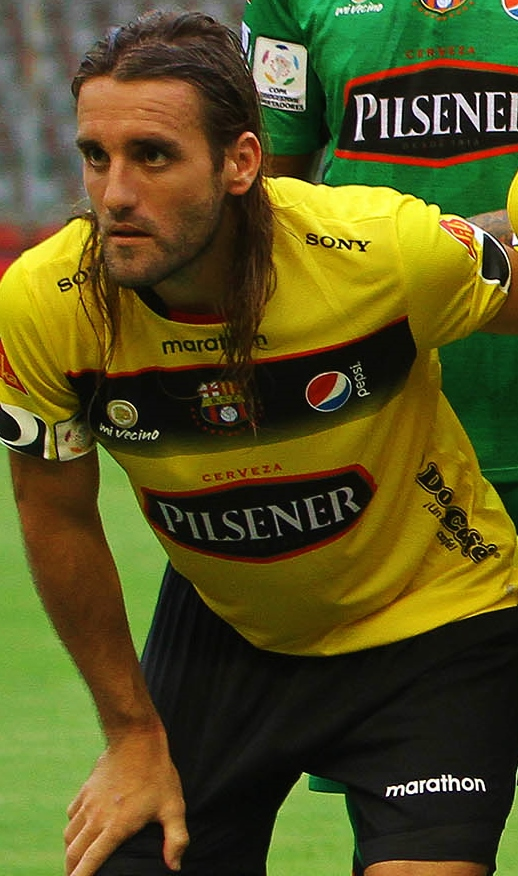

Personal information
- Full name: Alejandro Javier Frezzotti
- Date of birth: February 15, 1984 (age 42)
- Place of birth: Monte Buey, Argentina
- Height: 1.75 m (5 ft 9 in)
- Position: Midfielder

Team information
- Current team: Gimnasia y Tiro

Youth career
- Lanús

Senior career*
Years	Team	Apps	(Gls)
2005–2006	Lanús	10	(0)
2007–2008	Chacarita Juniors	47	(0)
2009	→ Treviso (loan)	11	(0)
2009–2010	Chacarita Juniors	40	(0)
2010	Gimnasia LP	14	(0)
2011	Sporting Cristal	20	(1)
2012	San Luis de Quillota	13	(0)
2012–2013	Boca Unidos	37	(1)
2013–2015	Deportivo Cuenca	57	(3)
2015	Barcelona SC	15	(0)
2015	Temperley	10	(0)
2016–2018	Gimnasia Jujuy	94	(5)
2020	Aucas	14	(0)
2021	Mitre	11	(0)
2021	Manta	11	(0)
2022–	Gimnasia y Tiro	17	(0)
- * Club domestic league appearances and goals as of 21:03, 19 July 2022 (UTC)

Alejandro Javier Frezzotti (born February 15, 1984) is a former Argentine football midfielder for Gimnasia y Tiro.

== Career ==
Frezzotti started his career during the 2005–06 seasons playing for Lanús. He only played three games with his first teams and all of them coming on as a substitute. In 2007, he moved to Chacarita Juniors in the Argentine Primera B Nacional (second division). He won promotion with the club and stayed to play during the 2009–10 Argentine Primera División season. However, Chacarita were relegated at the end of the Clausura tournament and Frezzoti left the club to join Gimnasia y Esgrima La Plata.
