= Anton Enus =

South African and Australian journalist

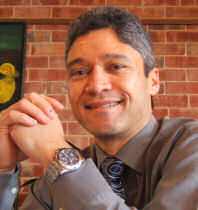
- Born: Anton Albert Enus; 15 September 1961 (age 65); Soweto, South Africa
- Citizenship: South Africa; Australia
- Occupation: News presenter
- Years active: 1989–present
- Employer: Special Broadcasting Service
- Known for: SBS World News
- Partner: Roger Henning (1989–present)

Anton Albert Enus is a South African-Australian news presenter.

He presented SBS World News on Special Broadcasting Service (SBS).

== Career ==
Enus has worked as a news presenter and journalist since 1999.

Before joining SBS, he spent 15 years with South Africa’s national broadcaster, the SABC, working across both radio and television. During this period he received several industry honours, including the CNN World Report Award for Best International Report and the Bokmakierie Award for Current Affairs. Prior to leaving South Africa, he presented the SABC’s flagship evening national news bulletin.

Enus joined SBS World News Tonight, where he spent five years before becoming presenter of the late edition of SBS World News Australia, which aired weeknights at 9:30 pm until December 2007. Following the departure of Mary Kostakidis and Stan Grant, he was appointed co‑host of the main SBS World News Australia bulletin on 17 December 2007, working alongside Janice Petersen and Amrita Cheema.

After taking extended personal leave in 2017, Enus returned in 2018 as the permanent weekend presenter of SBS World News.

In July 2026, Enus announced that he would retire from SBS World News in September after 27 years with the network. He presented his final bulletin on 11 September 2026.

== Personal life ==
Enus was a founding member of South Africa's gay and lesbian sports movement in the early 1980s and was on the organising team that guided the country into the Gay Games for the first time in 1994. He has also served on committees aimed at reconciling Johannesburg's multi-cultural gay and lesbian communities. Enus presented a special report about international LGBT issues during SBS's coverage of the 2014 Sydney Mardi Gras.

Enus is a keen long-distance runner, having completed more than four standard or ultra-marathons. He has completed South Africa's premier ultra-marathon, the Comrades (90 km), twice. He also enjoys squash, tennis, road running and hiking. In 1999, he migrated to Sydney with Roger Henning, his partner of 10 years, and they both became Australian citizens in July 2002.

In December 2016 he was diagnosed with early-stage bowel cancer and went public with the news in early 2017, which encouraged others to publicise the importance of using the testing kits provided by the government.
