= Janice Petersen =

Australian television presenter (born 1977)

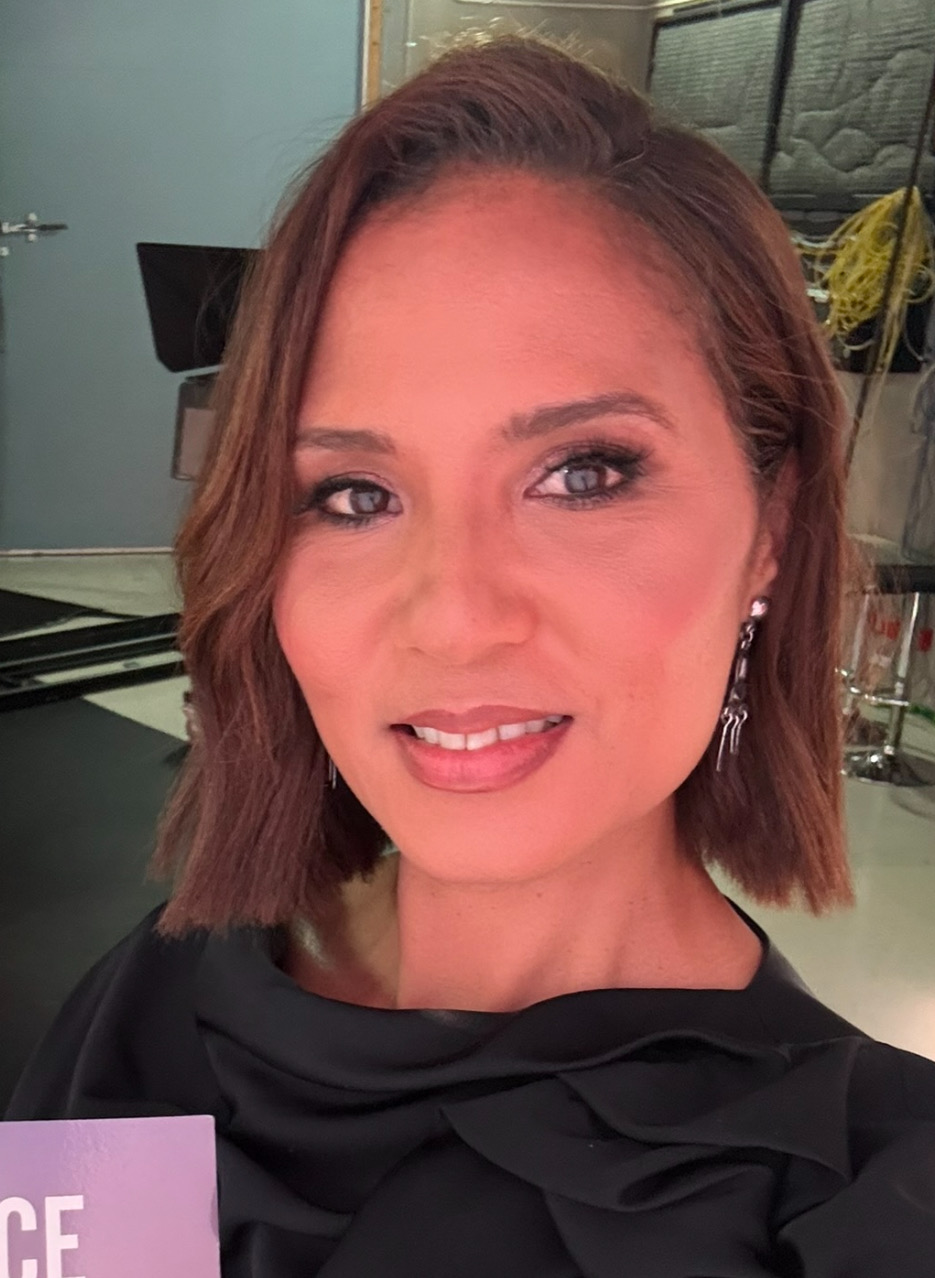
- Janice Petersen
- Born: 22 April 1977 (age 49); Sydney, Australia
- Education: University of Newcastle
- Occupation: News presenter
- Employer: Special Broadcasting Service
- Known for: SBS World News
- Partner: Julian Hamilton

Janice Petersen (born 22 April 1977) is an Australian television presenter. She is currently the presenter of SBS World News on Special Broadcasting Service (SBS).

== Early life ==
Petersen was born in 1977 to parents of South African lineage in Sydney. She was raised in Woy Woy on the Central Coast of New South Wales. She grew up with her brother Dale Petersen.

She is a graduate from the University of Newcastle, with a Bachelor of Communication degree.

== Career ==
Petersen went to work at SBS in 2000 as a freelance staff person and soon was operating the autocue and writing obscure freelance stories. She then moved over to ABC in Adelaide as a newsreader after landing a bi-media cadetship. Petersen returned to SBS in 2006 as a sports presenter.

== Personal life ==
Janice lives in Sydney with her partner Julian Hamilton of electronic band The Presets. The couple have two daughters, born in 2010 and 2013.

A sports enthusiast, she participated in the high jump, 100-metre and 200-metre sprints, and netball. She is a photographer and has had her photographs published for the 2000 Summer Olympics and street life around Sydney.

A portrait painting of Janice by Swiss-born Victorian artist Marc de Jong was named among the finalists in the 2010 Archibald Prize.
