= List of J1 League transfers winter 2016–17 =

This is a list of Japanese football J1 League transfers in the winter transfer window 2016–17 by club.

== Urawa Red Diamonds ==
In: Note: Flags indicate national team as defined under FIFA eligibility rules; some limited exceptions apply. Players may hold more than one non-FIFA nationality.

No.	Pos.	Nation	Player
8	FW	BRA	Rafael Silva (from (Japan) Albirex Niigata)
15	MF	JPN	Kazuki Nagasawa (from (Japan) JEF United Chiba, previously on loan)
17	DF	JPN	Yu Tamura (on loan from (Japan) Avispa Fukuoka)
19	FW	JPN	Ado Onaiwu (from (Japan) JEF United Chiba)
25	GK	JPN	Tetsuya Enomoto (from (Japan) Yokohama F. Marinos)
28	GK	JPN	Haruki Fukushima (from (Japan) Gainare Tottori, previously on loan)
38	MF	JPN	Daisuke Kikuchi (from (Japan) Shonan Bellmare)
39	MF	JPN	Shinya Yajima (from (Japan) Fagiano Okayama, previously on loan)

Out: Note: Flags indicate national team as defined under FIFA eligibility rules; some limited exceptions apply. Players may hold more than one non-FIFA nationality.

No.	Pos.	Nation	Player
2	DF	JPN	Kenichi Kaga (to (Japan) Montedio Yamagata)
11	FW	JPN	Naoki Ishihara (on loan to (Japan) Vegalta Sendai)
15	GK	JPN	Koki Otani (to (Japan) Albirex Niigata)
17	DF	JPN	Mitsuru Nagata (to (Japan) Tokyo Verdy)
31	DF	SLO	Branko Ilic (to (Slovenia) Olimpija Ljubljana)
—	DF	JPN	Rikiya Motegi (on loan to (Japan) Montedio Yamagata)
—	DF	JPN	Wataru Hashimoto (to (Japan) Vissel Kobe, previously on loan)
—	MF	JPN	Shota Saito (on loan to (Japan) Mito HollyHock)
—	FW	JPN	Toyofumi Sakano (to (Japan) Montedio Yamagata)

== Kawasaki Frontale ==
In: Note: Flags indicate national team as defined under FIFA eligibility rules; some limited exceptions apply. Players may hold more than one non-FIFA nationality.

No.	Pos.	Nation	Player
8	MF	JPN	Hiroyuki Abe (from (Japan) Gamba Osaka)
20	FW	JPN	Kei Chinen (from Aichi Gakuin University)
21	FW	BRA	Eduardo Neto (from (Brazil) Avaí, previously on loan)
22	DF	BRA	Rhayner (from (Brazil) Ponte Preta)
23	DF	BRA	Dudu (footballer, born 1993) (from (Japan) Kashiwa Reysol, previously on loan)
26	DF	PHI	Jefferson Tabinas (from Toko Gakuen High School)
29	DF	JPN	Michael James (from (Japan) Albirex Niigata)
31	GK	JPN	William Popp (on loan from (Japan) Tokyo Verdy)
32	MF	JPN	Ao Tanaka (promoted from youth ranks)
41	MF	JPN	Akihiro Ienaga (from (Japan) Omiya Ardija)

Out: Note: Flags indicate national team as defined under FIFA eligibility rules; some limited exceptions apply. Players may hold more than one non-FIFA nationality.

No.	Pos.	Nation	Player
7	MF	JPN	Koji Hashimoto (released)
8	DF	JPN	Takanobu Komiyama (to (Japan) Yokohama FC)
13	FW	JPN	Yoshito Ōkubo (to (Japan) FC Tokyo)
15	MF	JPN	Riki Harakawa (on loan to (Japan) Sagan Tosu)
22	MF	JPN	Yoshihiro Nakano (on loan to (Japan) Vegalta Sendai)
29	GK	JPN	Shun Takagi (to (Japan) Oita Trinita)
—	DF	JPN	Akito Fukumori (to (Japan) Hokkaido Consadole Sapporo, previously on loan)
—	MF	JPN	Masataka Kani (on loan to (Japan) FC Imabari, previously on loan at (Japan) Zweigen Kanazawa)
—	FW	PRK	An Byong-jun (to (Japan) Roasso Kumamoto, previously on loan at (Japan) Zweigen Kanazawa)

== Kashima Antlers ==
In: Note: Flags indicate national team as defined under FIFA eligibility rules; some limited exceptions apply. Players may hold more than one non-FIFA nationality.

No.	Pos.	Nation	Player
1	GK	KOR	Kwoun Sun-tae (from (South Korea) Jeonbuk Hyundai Motors)
4	MF	BRA	Léo Silva (from (Japan) Albirex Niigata)
7	FW	BRA	Pedro Júnior (from (Japan) Vissel Kobe)
11	FW	BRA	Leandro (on loan from (Brazil) Palmeiras)
14	FW	JPN	Takeshi Kanamori (from (Japan) Avispa Fukuoka)
20	MF	JPN	Yuto Misao (from (Japan) Shonan Bellmare, previously on loan)
23	DF	JPN	Itsuki Oda (from Higashi Fukuoka High School)
30	FW	JPN	Hiroki Abe (from Setouchi High School)

Out: Note: Flags indicate national team as defined under FIFA eligibility rules; some limited exceptions apply. Players may hold more than one non-FIFA nationality.

No.	Pos.	Nation	Player
1	GK	JPN	Masatoshi Kushibiki (to (Japan) Shimizu S-Pulse, previously on loan)
10	MF	JPN	Gaku Shibasaki (to (Spain) CD Tenerife)
11	MF	JPN	Fabrício (to (Brazil) Portimonense, back from loan)
14	DF	KOR	Hwang Seok-ho (to (China) Tianjin Teda)
30	MF	JPN	Hisashi Ohashi (to (Japan) Zweigen Kanazawa)
32	MF	JPN	Taro Sugimoto (on loan to (Japan) Tokushima Vortis)
35	MF	JPN	Taiki Hirato (on loan to (Japan) Machida Zelvia)
37	FW	JPN	Yuki Kakita (on loan to (Japan) Zweigen Kanazawa)
—	FW	JPN	Hiroyuki Takasaki (to (Japan) Matsumoto Yamaga, previously on loan)

== Gamba Osaka ==
In: Note: Flags indicate national team as defined under FIFA eligibility rules; some limited exceptions apply. Players may hold more than one non-FIFA nationality.

No.	Pos.	Nation	Player
2	DF	JPN	Genta Miura (from (Japan) Shimizu S-Pulse)
3	DF	BRA	Fábio Aguiar (from (Japan) Yokohama F. Marinos)
9	FW	BRA	Ademilson (from (Brazil) São Paulo FC, previously on loan)
19	GK	JPN	Ryota Suzuki (from (Japan) Yokohama F. Marinos)
23	MF	JPN	Shogo Nakahara (from (Japan) Hokkaido Consadole Sapporo)
24	MF	JPN	Haruya Ide (from (Japan) JEF United Chiba)
27	MF	JPN	Yuto Mori (from (Japan) Nagoya Grampus)
29	FW	JPN	Hiromu Kori (on loan from (Japan) Tokyo Verdy)
34	MF	JPN	Takahiro Ko (from Ichiritsu Funabashi High School)
39	MF	JPN	Jin Izumisawa (from (Japan) Omiya Ardija)
40	MF	JPN	Ryotaro Meshino (promoted from youth ranks)
43	DF	KOR	Bae Soo-yong (from Seoul Boin High School)
44	MF	JPN	Reo Takae (from Higashi Fukuoka High School)

Out: Note: Flags indicate national team as defined under FIFA eligibility rules; some limited exceptions apply. Players may hold more than one non-FIFA nationality.

No.	Pos.	Nation	Player
3	DF	JPN	Takaharu Nishino (on loan to (Japan) JEF United Chiba)
8	DF	JPN	Keisuke Iwashita (to (Japan) Avispa Fukuoka)
13	MF	JPN	Hiroyuki Abe (to (Japan) Kawasaki Frontale)
17	MF	JPN	Kenya Okazaki (to (Japan) Tochigi SC)
19	MF	JPN	Kotaro Omori (to (Japan) Vissel Kobe)
24	FW	JPN	Naoki Ogawa (released)
27	MF	JPN	Tatsuya Uchida (on loan to (Japan) Tokyo Verdy)
40	MF	JPN	Shohei Ogura (to (Japan) Ventforet Kofu)
—	FW	JPN	Shingo Akamine (to (Japan) Fagiano Okayama, previously on loan)

== Omiya Ardija ==
In: Note: Flags indicate national team as defined under FIFA eligibility rules; some limited exceptions apply. Players may hold more than one non-FIFA nationality.

No.	Pos.	Nation	Player
6	DF	JPN	Akinari Kawazura (from Meiji University)
10	FW	JPN	Genki Omae (from (Japan) Shimizu S-Pulse)
16	MF	BRA	Mateus (from (Brazil) Bahia, previously on loan)
28	MF	JPN	Ariajasuru Hasegawa (from (Japan) Shonan Bellmare)
38	MF	JPN	Riku Yamada (promoted from youth ranks)
40	MF	JPN	Akimi Barada (from (Japan) Kashiwa Reysol)
44	MF	JPN	Yusuke Segawa (from (Japan) Thespakusatsu Gunma)

Out: Note: Flags indicate national team as defined under FIFA eligibility rules; some limited exceptions apply. Players may hold more than one non-FIFA nationality.

No.	Pos.	Nation	Player
18	MF	JPN	Tomonobu Yokoyama (on loan to (Japan) Hokkaido Consadole Sapporo)
26	MF	JPN	Masato Kojima (on loan to (Japan) Mito HollyHock)
29	FW	JPN	Kento Kawata (on loan to (Japan) Thespakusatsu Gunma)
39	MF	JPN	Jin Izumisawa (to (Japan) Gamba Osaka)
41	MF	JPN	Akihiro Ienaga (to (Japan) Kawasaki Frontale)
—	GK	JPN	Shuhei Kawata (to (Japan) Tochigi SC, previously on loan)
—	DF	JPN	Shunsuke Fukuda (to (Japan) Giravanz Kitakyushu, previously on loan)

== Sanfrecce Hiroshima ==
In: Note: Flags indicate national team as defined under FIFA eligibility rules; some limited exceptions apply. Players may hold more than one non-FIFA nationality.

No.	Pos.	Nation	Player
10	FW	BRA	Felipe de Oliveira Silva (from (Brazil) Ceará)
15	MF	JPN	Sho Inagaki (from (Japan) Ventforet Kofu)
25	DF	JPN	Osamu Henry Iyoha (promoted from youth ranks)
32	MF	JPN	Taishi Matsumoto (from Shohei High School)
34	GK	JPN	Hirotsugu Nakabayashi (from (Japan) Fagiano Okayama)
50	FW	JPN	Masato Kudo (from (Canada) Vancouver Whitecaps)

Out: Note: Flags indicate national team as defined under FIFA eligibility rules; some limited exceptions apply. Players may hold more than one non-FIFA nationality.

No.	Pos.	Nation	Player
7	MF	JPN	Koji Morisaki (retired)
11	FW	JPN	Hisato Satō (from (Japan) Sanfrecce Hiroshima)
13	GK	JPN	Takuya Masuda (on loan to (Japan) V-Varen Nagasaki)
37	DF	JPN	Kazuya Miyahara (to (Japan) Nagoya Grampus)
—	MF	JPN	Gakuto Natsuda (on loan to (Japan) Shimizu S-Pulse, previously on loan at (Japan) Albirex Niigata)

== Vissel Kobe ==
In: Note: Flags indicate national team as defined under FIFA eligibility rules; some limited exceptions apply. Players may hold more than one non-FIFA nationality.

No.	Pos.	Nation	Player
1	GK	JPN	Daiki Maekawa (from Kansai University)
3	DF	JPN	Hirofumi Watanabe (from (Japan) Vegalta Sendai)
8	MF	BRA	Wescley (from (Brazil) Atlético Mineiro)
16	MF	JPN	Hideto Takahashi (from (Japan) FC Tokyo)
21	FW	JPN	Junya Tanaka (from (Portugal) Sporting CP, previously on loan at (Japan) Kashiwa Reysol)
22	DF	JPN	Wataru Hashimoto (from (Japan) Urawa Red Diamonds, previously on loan)
26	DF	JPN	Shinji Yamaguchi (from (Japan) Oita Trinita, back from loan)
28	GK	JPN	Kenshin Yoshimaru (from (Japan) Oita Trinita, back from loan)
29	MF	JPN	Kotaro Omori (from (Japan) Gamba Osaka)
33	FW	JPN	Shuhei Otsuki (from (Japan) Shonan Bellmare)
35	MF	JPN	Takuya Yasui (promoted from youth ranks)

Out: Note: Flags indicate national team as defined under FIFA eligibility rules; some limited exceptions apply. Players may hold more than one non-FIFA nationality.

No.	Pos.	Nation	Player
2	DF	JPN	Yudai Tanaka (to (Japan) Hokkaido Consadole Sapporo)
3	DF	JPN	Takahito Soma (retired)
7	FW	BRA	Pedro Júnior (to (Japan) Kashima Antlers)
8	DF	JPN	Shohei Takahashi (to (Japan) Júbilo Iwata)
9	FW	JPN	Daisuke Ishizu (back to (Japan) Avispa Fukuoka, previously on loan)
20	MF	JPN	Asahi Masuyama (on loan to (Japan) Yokohama FC)
21	GK	JPN	Koki Matsuzawa (to (Japan) Tokushima Vortis)
27	MF	JPN	Ryo Matsumura (on loan to (Japan) Tokushima Vortis)
22	GK	JPN	Kaito Yamamoto (to (Japan) JEF United Chiba)
32	MF	JPN	Ryosuke Maeda (on loan to (Japan) Oita Trinita)
33	DF	JPN	Taisuke Muramatsu (back to (Japan) Shimizu S-Pulse, previously on loan)
—	MF	JPN	Tatsuki Noda (on loan to (Japan) FC Imabari)
—	FW	JPN	Akito Mukai (on loan to (Japan) FC Imabari)

== Kashiwa Reysol ==
In: Note: Flags indicate national team as defined under FIFA eligibility rules; some limited exceptions apply. Players may hold more than one non-FIFA nationality.

No.	Pos.	Nation	Player
3	DF	KOR	Yun Suk-young (from (Denmark) Brøndby IF)
13	DF	JPN	Ryuta Koike (from (Japan) Renofa Yamaguchi)
20	MF	BRA	Ramon Lopes (from (Japan) Vegalta Sendai)
21	DF	JPN	Takuya Hashiguchi (from Ryutsu Keizai University)
24	FW	JPN	Koki Oshima (back from (Japan) Kataller Toyama, previously on loan)
26	DF	JPN	Taiyo Koga (promoted from youth ranks)

Out: Note: Flags indicate national team as defined under FIFA eligibility rules; some limited exceptions apply. Players may hold more than one non-FIFA nationality.

No.	Pos.	Nation	Player
5	DF	JPN	Tatsuya Masushima (on loan to (Japan) Vegalta Sendai)
6	DF	JPN	Ryosuke Yamanaka (to (Japan) Yokohama F. Marinos)
8	MF	JPN	Akimi Barada (to (Japan) Omiya Ardija)
9	FW	JPN	Junya Tanaka (to (Portugal) Sporting CP, previously on loan)
16	GK	JPN	Koji Inada (to (Japan) Albirex Niigata)
17	MF	JPN	Hiroki Akino (on loan to (Japan) Shonan Bellmare)
21	DF	JPN	Masato Yuzawa (on loan to (Japan) Kyoto Sanga)
26	MF	JPN	Tetsuro Ota (to (Japan) Sagan Tosu)
—	DF	BRA	Eduardo (to (Japan) Kawasaki Frontale, previously on loan)
—	MF	JPN	Yu Kimura (to (Japan) V-Varen Nagasaki, previously on loan)

== Yokohama F. Marinos ==
In: Note: Flags indicate national team as defined under FIFA eligibility rules; some limited exceptions apply. Players may hold more than one non-FIFA nationality.

No.	Pos.	Nation	Player
6	MF	JPN	Takahiro Ogihara (from (Japan) Nagoya Grampus)
7	FW	POR	Hugo Vieira (from (Serbia) Red Star Belgrade)
19	MF	JPN	Teruhito Nakagawa (back from (Japan) Machida Zelvia, previously on loan)
24	DF	JPN	Ryosuke Yamanaka (from (Japan) Kashiwa Reysol)
27	DF	JPN	Ken Matsubara (from (Japan) Albirex Niigata)
28	DF	JPN	Ryo Takano (from Nippon Sport Science University)
30	GK	JPN	Ayaki Suzuki (from (Japan) Giravanz Kitakyushu)
31	GK	JPN	Daichi Sugimoto (from (Japan) Kyoto Sanga)
33	MF	MKD	David Babunski (from (Serbia) Red Star Belgrade)
34	DF	AUS	Miloš Degenek (from (Germany) 1860 Munich)
35	MF	JPN	Kaina Yoshio (promoted from youth ranks)

Out: Note: Flags indicate national team as defined under FIFA eligibility rules; some limited exceptions apply. Players may hold more than one non-FIFA nationality.

No.	Pos.	Nation	Player
1	GK	JPN	Tetsuya Enomoto (to (Japan) Urawa Red Diamonds)
5	DF	JPN	Fábio Aguiar (to (Japan) Gamba Osaka)
7	MF	JPN	Shingo Hyodo (to (Japan) Hokkaido Consadole Sapporo)
9	FW	BRA	Kayke (back to (Brazil) Santos, previously on loan)
10	MF	JPN	Shunsuke Nakamura (to (Japan) Júbilo Iwata)
13	DF	JPN	Yuzo Kobayashi (to (Japan) Sagan Tosu)
14	FW	JPN	Masashi Wada (on loan to (Japan) Renofa Yamaguchi)
30	GK	JPN	Junto Taguchi (on loan to (Japan) Fujieda MYFC)
31	GK	JPN	Takuya Takahashi (to (Japan) Giravanz Kitakyushu)
—	GK	JPN	Ryota Suzuki (to (Japan) Gamba Osaka, previously on loan at (Japan) Tokyo Verdy)
—	DF	JPN	Fumitaka Kitakani (to (Japan) V-Varen Nagasaki)
—	MF	JPN	Andrew Kumagai (on loan to (Japan) JEF United Chiba, previously on loan at (Japan) Zweigen Kanazawa)
—	FW	BRA	Rafinha (released)

== FC Tokyo ==
In: Note: Flags indicate national team as defined under FIFA eligibility rules; some limited exceptions apply. Players may hold more than one non-FIFA nationality.

No.	Pos.	Nation	Player
1	GK	JPN	Takuo Okubo (from (Japan) V-Varen Nagasaki)
6	DF	JPN	Kosuke Ota (from (Netherlands) Vitesse)
8	MF	JPN	Yojiro Takahagi (from (South Korea) FC Seoul)
13	FW	JPN	Yoshito Ōkubo (from (Japan) Kawasaki Frontale)
15	FW	JPN	Kensuke Nagai (from (Japan) Nagoya Grampus)
28	MF	JPN	Takuya Uchida (promoted from youth ranks)
29	DF	JPN	Makoto Okazaki (promoted from youth ranks)
30	GK	JPN	Riku Hirosue (from Aomori Yamada High School)
33	GK	JPN	Akihiro Hayashi (from (Japan) Sagan Tosu)
35	MF	JPN	Yoshitake Suzuki (promoted from youth ranks)
36	DF	JPN	Masayuki Yamada (from Hosei University)
50	GK	JPN	Go Hatano (promoted from youth ranks)
—	MF	KOR	Ha Dae-sung (loan return from (Japan) Nagoya Grampus)

Out: Note: Flags indicate national team as defined under FIFA eligibility rules; some limited exceptions apply. Players may hold more than one non-FIFA nationality.

No.	Pos.	Nation	Player
4	MF	JPN	Hideto Takahashi (to (Japan) Vissel Kobe)
9	FW	JPN	Sota Hirayama (to (Japan) Vegalta Sendai)
11	FW	BRA	Muriqui (back to (Qatar) Al-Sadd SC, previously on loan)
13	GK	JPN	Tatsuya Enomoto (retired)
22	MF	JPN	Naotake Hanyu (to (Japan) JEF United Chiba)
23	FW	JPN	Yohei Hayashi (to (Japan) Oita Trinita)
28	MF	JPN	Shuto Kono (to (Japan) V-Varen Nagasaki)
31	GK	JPN	Kentaro Kakoi (to (Japan) Cerezo Osaka)
34	MF	JPN	Hideyuki Nozawa (on loan to (Japan) FC Gifu)
47	GK	JPN	Yota Akimoto (to (Japan) Shonan Bellmare)
48	MF	JPN	Kota Mizunuma (on loan to (Japan) Cerezo Osaka)
50	DF	JPN	Yūichi Komano (released)
—	GK	JPN	Shuichi Gonda (to (Japan) Sagan Tosu)
—	MF	JPN	Hirotaka Mita (to (Japan) Vegalta Sendai, previously on loan)

== Sagan Tosu ==
In: Note: Flags indicate national team as defined under FIFA eligibility rules; some limited exceptions apply. Players may hold more than one non-FIFA nationality.

No.	Pos.	Nation	Player
3	DF	ARG	Franco Sbuttoni (from (Argentina) Atlético Tucumán)
4	MF	JPN	Riki Harakawa (on loan from (Japan) Kawasaki Frontale)
13	DF	JPN	Yuzo Kobayashi (from (Japan) Yokohama F. Marinos)
19	MF	JPN	Tetsuro Ota (from (Japan) Kashiwa Reysol)
20	MF	JPN	Yoshizumi Ogawa (from (Japan) Nagoya Grampus)
27	FW	JPN	Kyosuke Tagawa (promoted from youth ranks)
28	MF	JPN	Hiroto Ishikawa (promoted from youth ranks)
33	GK	JPN	Shuichi Gonda (from (Japan) FC Tokyo)
40	FW	JPN	Yuji Ono (from (Belgium) Sint-Truiden)
50	MF	JPN	Koki Mizuno (from (Japan) Vegalta Sendai)

Out: Note: Flags indicate national team as defined under FIFA eligibility rules; some limited exceptions apply. Players may hold more than one non-FIFA nationality.

No.	Pos.	Nation	Player
3	DF	JPN	Keita Isozaki (retired)
4	DF	JPN	Teruaki Kobayashi (retired)
6	MF	ALG	Aymen Tahar (to (Romania) Gaz Metan Medias)
9	FW	MAR	Moestafa El Kabir (to (Turkey) Antalyaspor)
10	MF	KOR	Kim Min-woo (to (South Korea) Suwon Samsung Bluewings)
15	DF	JPN	Ryuhei Niwa (released)
21	GK	JPN	Ayumi Niekawa (back to (Japan) Júbilo Iwata, previously on loan)
25	MF	JPN	Ryota Hayasaka (to (Japan) Hokkaido Consadole Sapporo)
33	GK	JPN	Akihiro Hayashi (to (Japan) FC Tokyo)
39	FW	JPN	Shohei Okada (to (Japan) Thespakusatsu Gunma)
—	GK	JPN	Eisuke Fujishima (on loan to Matsumoto Yamaga, previously on loan at (Japan) JEF United Chiba)
—	DF	JPN	Shohei Kishida (to (Japan) Oita Trinita, previously on loan at (Japan) V-Varen Nagasaki)
—	DF	JPN	Tatsuya Sakai (on loan to (Japan) Oita Trinita, previously on loan at (Japan) V-Varen Nagasaki)
—	MF	KOR	Choi Sung-keun (to (South Korea) Suwon Samsung Bluewings, previously on loan at (Japan) FC Gifu)
—	MF	JPN	Koki Kiyotake (to (Japan) JEF United Chiba, previously on loan at (Japan) Roasso Kumamoto)
—	MF	KOR	Baek Sung-dong (to (South Korea) Suwon FC, previously on loan at (Japan) V-Varen Nagasaki)
—	MF	JPN	Tomotaka Okamoto (to (Japan) Matsumoto Yamaga, previously on loan at (Japan) Shonan Bellmare)
—	FW	JPN	Shūto Hira (released)
—	FW	JPN	Ryogo Yamasaki (to (Japan) Tokushima Vortis, previously on loan)

== Vegalta Sendai ==
In: Note: Flags indicate national team as defined under FIFA eligibility rules; some limited exceptions apply. Players may hold more than one non-FIFA nationality.

No.	Pos.	Nation	Player
1	GK	USA	Daniel Schmidt (back from (Japan) Matsumoto Yamaga, previously on loan)
2	DF	JPN	Katsuya Nagato (from Hosei University)
9	FW	JPN	Sota Hirayama (from (Japan) FC Tokyo)
11	FW	JPN	Naoki Ishihara (on loan from (Japan) Urawa Red Diamonds)
13	DF	JPN	Yasuhiro Hiraoka (from (Japan) Shimizu S-Pulse, previously on loan)
18	MF	JPN	Hirotaka Mita (from (Japan) FC Tokyo, previously on loan)
20	FW	BRA	Crislan (on loan from (Portugal) S.C. Braga)
23	MF	JPN	Yoshihiro Nakano (on loan from (Japan) Kawasaki Frontale)
50	DF	JPN	Tatsuya Masushima (on loan from (Japan) Kashiwa Reysol)

Out: Note: Flags indicate national team as defined under FIFA eligibility rules; some limited exceptions apply. Players may hold more than one non-FIFA nationality.

No.	Pos.	Nation	Player
1	GK	JPN	Yuji Rokutan (to (Japan) Shimizu S-Pulse)
3	DF	JPN	Hirofumi Watanabe (to (Japan) Vissel Kobe)
6	MF	KOR	Kim Min-tae (to (Japan) Hokkaido Consadole Sapporo)
9	FW	BRA	Wilson (to (Japan) Ventforet Kofu)
11	FW	JPN	Hidetaka Kanazono (to (Japan) Hokkaido Consadole Sapporo)
19	MF	JPN	Kyohei Sugiura (to (Japan) Zweigen Kanazawa)
20	MF	BRA	Ramon Lopes (to (Japan) Kashiwa Reysol)
29	MF	JPN	Koki Mizuno (to (Japan) Sagan Tosu)

== Júbilo Iwata ==
In: Note: Flags indicate national team as defined under FIFA eligibility rules; some limited exceptions apply. Players may hold more than one non-FIFA nationality.

No.	Pos.	Nation	Player
8	MF	UZB	Fozil Musaev (from (Uzbekistan) FC Nasaf)
10	MF	JPN	Shunsuke Nakamura (from (Japan) Yokohama F. Marinos)
14	MF	JPN	Masaya Matsumoto (from (Japan) Oita Trinita)
20	FW	JPN	Kengo Kawamata (from (Japan) Nagoya Grampus)
26	MF	JPN	Kotaro Fujikawa (from Higashi Fukuoka High School)
34	MF	JPN	Takeaki Harigaya (from Shohei High School)
36	GK	JPN	Ryuki Miura (from (Japan) Nagano Parceiro)
41	DF	JPN	Shohei Takahashi (from (Japan) Vissel Kobe)
—	FW	JPN	Seiya Nakano (from University of Tsukuba)

Out: Note: Flags indicate national team as defined under FIFA eligibility rules; some limited exceptions apply. Players may hold more than one non-FIFA nationality.

No.	Pos.	Nation	Player
8	FW	ENG	Jay Bothroyd (released)
14	DF	JPN	Kazumichi Takagi (to (Thailand) Air Force Central F.C.)
19	DF	JPN	Ryu Okada (retired)
20	FW	JPN	Yasuhito Morishima (released)
28	DF	JPN	Ryoma Ishida (on loan to (Japan) Zweigen Kanazawa)
34	FW	JPN	Yuki Nakamura (retired)
36	GK	JPN	Tatsuro Okuda (to (Japan) V-Varen Nagasaki)
44	DF	GRE	Avraam Papadopoulos (released)
—	GK	JPN	Ayumi Niekawa (on loan to (Japan) Thespakusatsu Gunma, previously on loan at (Japan) Sagan Tosu)
—	MF	JPN	Hiroto Tanaka (on loan to (Japan) Ehime FC, previously on loan at (Japan) V-Varen Nagasaki)
—	MF	JPN	Misaki Uemura (to (Japan) FC Imabari, previously on loan)
—	FW	JPN	Ryuolivier Iwamoto (on loan to (Japan) Gainare Tottori)

== Ventforet Kofu ==
In: Note: Flags indicate national team as defined under FIFA eligibility rules; some limited exceptions apply. Players may hold more than one non-FIFA nationality.

No.	Pos.	Nation	Player
2	MF	JPN	Toshio Shimakawa (from (Japan) Renofa Yamaguchi)
6	DF	BRA	Éder Lima (from (Brazil) América Mineiro)
9	FW	BRA	Wilson (from (Japan) Vegalta Sendai)
11	MF	JPN	Yuki Horigome (from (Japan) Kyoto Sanga)
15	MF	JPN	Akihiro Hyodo (from (Japan) Mito HollyHock)
18	MF	JPN	Ryohei Michibuchi (from Meiji University)
19	MF	JPN	Koki Wakasugi (back from (Japan) Sarcos Fukui, previously on loan)
22	DF	JPN	Yuta Koide (from Meiji University)
24	DF	JPN	Yutaka Soneda (from Biwako Seikei Sport College)
29	FW	BRA	Gabriel (on loan from (Brazil) São Paulo FC)
40	MF	JPN	Shohei Ogura (from (Japan) Gamba Osaka)

Out: Note: Flags indicate national team as defined under FIFA eligibility rules; some limited exceptions apply. Players may hold more than one non-FIFA nationality.

No.	Pos.	Nation	Player
2	DF	JPN	Kensuke Fukuda (to (Japan) V-Varen Nagasaki)
6	MF	BRA	Marquinhos Paraná (released)
9	FW	BRA	Davi (released)
15	MF	JPN	Takamitsu Yoshino (to (Thailand) Khonkaen F.C.)
20	FW	JPN	Kohei Morita (to (Japan) Thespakusatsu Gunma)
23	MF	JPN	Sho Inagaki (to (Japan) Sanfrecce Hiroshima)
24	DF	JPN	Naoya Shibamura (to (Japan) CRIACAO)
27	MF	AUS	Billy Celeski (released)
29	DF	JPN	Masaki Watanabe (to (Japan) Yokohama FC)
—	MF	JPN	Taisuke Akiyoshi (released)

== Albirex Niigata ==
In: Note: Flags indicate national team as defined under FIFA eligibility rules; some limited exceptions apply. Players may hold more than one non-FIFA nationality.

No.	Pos.	Nation	Player
1	GK	JPN	Koki Otani (from (Japan) Urawa Red Diamonds)
4	DF	KOR	Song Ju-hun (back from (Japan) Mito HollyHock, previously on loan)
6	MF	BRA	Jean Patrick (from (Brazil) Luverdense)
7	FW	BRA	Roni (from (Brazil) Cruzeiro)
10	MF	BRA	Thiago Galhardo (on loan from (Brazil) Coritiba)
15	MF	JPN	Isao Honma (from (Japan) Tochigi SC)
16	FW	JPN	Shu Hiramatsu (back from (Japan) Mito HollyHock, previously on loan)
19	DF	JPN	Kisho Yano (from (Japan) Nagoya Grampus)
23	MF	JPN	Noriyoshi Sakai (back from (Japan) Fagiano Okayama, previously on loan)
24	DF	JPN	Naoki Kawaguchi (back from (Japan) Shimizu S-Pulse, previously on loan)
25	DF	JPN	Takumi Hasegawa (promoted from youth ranks)
26	DF	JPN	Goson Sakai (back from (Japan) Fukushima United FC, previously on loan)
27	MF	JPN	Yuto Horigome (from (Japan) Hokkaido Consadole Sapporo)
29	MF	JPN	Shunsuke Mori (from Kwansei Gakuin University)
30	MF	PER	Romero Frank (back from (Japan) Mito HollyHock, previously on loan)
31	GK	JPN	Koji Inada (from (Japan) Kashiwa Reysol)
32	FW	JPN	Atsushi Kawata (from Albirex Niigata Singapore)
34	MF	JPN	Teruki Hara (from Ichiritsu Funabashi High School)
50	DF	JPN	Seitaro Tomisawa (from (Japan) JEF United Chiba)

Out: Note: Flags indicate national team as defined under FIFA eligibility rules; some limited exceptions apply. Players may hold more than one non-FIFA nationality.

No.	Pos.	Nation	Player
1	GK	JPN	Takaya Kurokawa (retired)
4	DF	JPN	Michael James (to (Japan) Kawasaki Frontale)
6	MF	JPN	Yuki Kobayashi (to (Japan) Nagoya Grampus)
7	DF	BRA	Bruno Cortez (back to (Brazil) São Paulo FC, previously on loan)
8	MF	BRA	Léo Silva (to (Japan) Kashima Antlers)
10	FW	BRA	Rafael Silva (to (Japan) Urawa Red Diamonds)
24	MF	JPN	Gakuto Notsuda (back to (Japan) Sanfrecce Hiroshima, previously on loan)
27	DF	JPN	Ken Matsubara (to (Japan) Yokohama F. Marinos)
29	MF	JPN	Kiwara Miyazaki (on loan to (Japan) Zweigen Kanazawa)
31	GK	JPN	Akihito Ozawa (to (Japan) Blaublitz Akita)
32	FW	BRA	Kalil (back to (Brazil) Criciúma, previously on loan)
41	MF	JPN	Kazuki Kozuka (on loan to (Japan) Renofa Yamaguchi)
—	GK	JPN	Yasuhiro Watanabe (to Japan Soccer College)

== Hokkaido Consadole Sapporo ==
In: Note: Flags indicate national team as defined under FIFA eligibility rules; some limited exceptions apply. Players may hold more than one non-FIFA nationality.

No.	Pos.	Nation	Player
2	MF	JPN	Tomonobu Yokoyama (on loan from (Japan) Omiya Ardija)
3	DF	JPN	Yudai Tanaka (from (Japan) Vissel Kobe)
6	DF	JPN	Shingo Hyodo (from (Japan) Yokohama F. Marinos)
20	MF	KOR	Kim Min-tae (from (Japan) Vegalta Sendai)
22	FW	JPN	Hidetaka Kanazono (from (Japan) Vegalta Sendai)
24	DF	JPN	Akito Fukumori (from (Japan) Kawasaki Frontale, previously on loan)
26	MF	JPN	Ryota Hayasaka (from (Japan) Sagan Tosu)
37	DF	JPN	Taiyo Hama (promoted from youth ranks)
38	FW	JPN	Daiki Suga (promoted from youth ranks)

Out: Note: Flags indicate national team as defined under FIFA eligibility rules; some limited exceptions apply. Players may hold more than one non-FIFA nationality.

No.	Pos.	Nation	Player
5	DF	JPN	Kazuki Kushibiki (on loan to (Japan) Nagoya Grampus)
6	DF	JPN	Takayuki Mae (on loan to (Japan) Renofa Yamaguchi)
20	MF	JPN	Kazumasa Uesato (to (Japan) Roasso Kumamoto)
22	MF	IDN	Irfan Bachdim (released)
28	MF	JPN	Yumemi Kanda (to (Japan) Ehime FC)
31	MF	JPN	Yuto Horigome (to (Japan) Albirex Niigata)
32	MF	JPN	Shogo Nakahara (on loan to (Japan) Gamba Osaka)
37	DF	JPN	Yuki Uchiyama (to (Japan) Gainare Tottori)
—	DF	JPN	Takuya Osanai (to (Japan) Fukushima United FC, previously on loan)
—	DF	JPN	Paulão (on loan to (Japan) Mito HollyHock, previously on loan at (Japan) Fukushima United FC)
—	MF	THA	Chanathip Songkrasin (on loan to (Thailand) BEC Tero Sasana FC)
—	FW	JPN	Mitsuteru Kudo (released)

== Shimizu S-Pulse ==
In: Note: Flags indicate national team as defined under FIFA eligibility rules; some limited exceptions apply. Players may hold more than one non-FIFA nationality.

No.	Pos.	Nation	Player
4	DF	BRA	Kanu (from (Thailand) Chonburi F.C.)
13	GK	JPN	Yuji Rokutan (from (Japan) Vegalta Sendai)
14	MF	JPN	Gakuto Notsuda (on loan from (Japan) Sanfrecce Hiroshima)
16	DF	JPN	Taisuke Muramatsu (back from (Japan) Vissel Kobe, previously on loan)
27	DF	JPN	Takahiro Iida (from Senshu University)
33	DF	JPN	Yugo Tatsuta (promoted from youth ranks)
—	GK	JPN	Masatoshi Kushibiki (from (Japan) Kashima Antlers, back from loan)

Out: Note: Flags indicate national team as defined under FIFA eligibility rules; some limited exceptions apply. Players may hold more than one non-FIFA nationality.

No.	Pos.	Nation	Player
2	DF	JPN	Genta Miura (to (Japan) Gamba Osaka)
5	DF	CAN	Dejan Jakovic (released)
7	MF	JPN	Takuya Honda (to (Japan) Montedio Yamagata)
8	MF	JPN	Hideki Ishige (on loan to (Japan) Fagiano Okayama)
10	FW	JPN	Genki Omae (to (Japan) Omiya Ardija)
13	GK	JPN	Rikihiro Sugiyama (to (Japan) Avispa Fukuoka)
14	FW	JPN	Takashi Sawada (to (Japan) V-Varen Nagasaki)
21	GK	JPN	Kempei Usui (on loan to (Japan) Machida Zelvia)
24	DF	JPN	Naoki Kawaguchi (back to (Japan) Albirex Niigata, previously on loan)
28	MF	JPN	Kohei Hattanda (to (Japan) Nagoya Grampus)
38	DF	JPN	Takayuki Fukumura (on loan to (Japan) FC Gifu)
—	GK	JPN	Masatoshi Kushibiki (on loan to (Japan) Fagiano Okayama, back from loan at (Japan) Kashima Antlers)
—	DF	JPN	Yasuhiro Hiraoka (to (Japan) Vegalta Sendai, previously on loan)
—	MF	JPN	Yoshiaki Takagi (to (Japan) Tokyo Verdy, previously on loan)
—	FW	JPN	Yuji Senuma (on loan to (Japan) Montedio Yamagata, back from loan at (Japan) Ehime FC)
—	FW	JPN	Sho Kagami (released)

== Cerezo Osaka ==
In: Note: Flags indicate national team as defined under FIFA eligibility rules; some limited exceptions apply. Players may hold more than one non-FIFA nationality.

No.	Pos.	Nation	Player
1	GK	JPN	Kentaro Kakoi (from (Japan) FC Tokyo)
6	MF	BRA	Souza (from (Brazil) Cruzeiro)
16	MF	JPN	Kota Mizunuma (on loan from (Japan) FC Tokyo)
17	MF	JPN	Takaki Fukimitsu (from (Japan) Renofa Yamaguchi)
22	DF	CRO	Matej Jonjić (from (South Korea) Incheon United)
25	FW	JPN	Hirofumi Yamauchi (from Waseda University)
29	DF	JPN	Kakeru Funaki (promoted from youth ranks)
30	MF	JPN	Musashi Oyama (from Sapporo Otani High School)
31	FW	JPN	Towa Yamane (from Sanfrecce Hiroshima Youth)
36	MF	JPN	Toshiki Onozawa (promoted from youth ranks)
37	DF	JPN	Reiya Morishita (promoted from youth ranks)
45	GK	JPN	Shu Mogi (from Toko Gakuen High School)
46	MF	JPN	Hiroshi Kiyotake (from (Spain) Sevilla FC)

Out: Note: Flags indicate national team as defined under FIFA eligibility rules; some limited exceptions apply. Players may hold more than one non-FIFA nationality.

No.	Pos.	Nation	Player
1	GK	JPN	Hiroyuki Takeda (on loan to (Japan) Tokyo Verdy)
10	FW	MKD	Besart Abdurahimi (back to (Belgium) Lokeren, previously on loan)
19	FW	JPN	Yuzo Tashiro (released)
20	FW	JPN	Keiji Tamada (from (Japan) Nagoya Grampus)
22	DF	JPN	Sota Nakazawa (retired)
25	MF	JPN	Daiki Kogure (from (Japan) Ehime FC)
36	FW	JPN	Rei Yonezawa (on loan to (Japan) Renofa Yamaguchi)
37	DF	JPN	Jurato Ikeda (to (Thailand) Bangkok Glass)
45	GK	JPN	Takashi Kitano (released)
—	DF	JPN	Yuki Kotani (on loan to (Japan) Roasso Kumamoto, previously on loan)
—	MF	JPN	Kai Hirano (from (Thailand) Army United, previously on loan)
—	MF	JPN	Hideo Hashimoto (to (Japan) Tokyo Verdy, previously on loan at (Japan) Nagano Parceiro)
