= 2013 Sagan Tosu season =

Sagan Tosu
2013 season
- Chairman: Yukihiro Igawa
- Manager: Yoon Jung-Hwan
- J.League Division 1: 12th
- Emperor's Cup: Semi-final vs Yokohama F. Marinos
- J.League Cup: Group stage
- Top goalscorer: League: Yohei Toyoda (20); All: Yohei Toyoda (24)
- Highest home attendance: 22,530 vs Omiya Ardija (17 August 2013)
- Lowest home attendance: 6,292 vs Ventforet Kofu (10 July 2013)
- Average home league attendance: 11,515
Home colours	Away colours

The 2013 Sagan Tosu season was Sagan Tosu's second season in J.League Division 1 after being promoted for J.League Division 2 in 2011. They finished the season in twelfth position, whilst participating in the J.League Cup group stages and reaching the Semifinal of the Emperor's Cup.

== Players ==
Note: Flags indicate national team as defined under FIFA eligibility rules; some limited exceptions apply. Players may hold more than one non-FIFA nationality.

No.	Pos.	Nation	Player
1	GK	JPN	Taku Akahoshi
3	DF	JPN	Keita Isozaki
4	DF	JPN	Teruaki Kobayashi
5	DF	JPN	Tatsuya Sakai
6	MF	COL	Jonathan
7	MF	JPN	Keisuke Funatani
8	MF	JPN	Kota Mizunuma
9	FW	JPN	Bando
10	MF	KOR	Kim Min-Woo
11	FW	JPN	Yohei Toyoda
12	GK	JPN	Tatsuro Okuda
13	DF	KOR	Kim Jung-Ya
14	MF	JPN	Naoyuki Fujita
15	DF	JPN	Ryuhei Niwa

No.	Pos.	Nation	Player
16	MF	BRA	Nilson
18	FW	JPN	Ryunosuke Noda
19	FW	JPN	Shohei Okada
20	DF	KOR	Yeo Sung-Hye
21	GK	JPN	Takuya Muro
22	FW	JPN	Kei Ikeda
23	MF	JPN	Toshiya Sueyoshi
25	MF	JPN	Ryota Hayasaka
26	DF	JPN	Shūto Hira
27	MF	JPN	Koki Kiyotake
28	MF	JPN	Yoshiki Takahashi
29	DF	JPN	Shohei Kishida
33	GK	JPN	Akihiro Hayashi
36	MF	JPN	Naoya Kikuchi

== Transfers ==
=== Winter ===
In: Note: Flags indicate national team as defined under FIFA eligibility rules; some limited exceptions apply. Players may hold more than one non-FIFA nationality.

No.	Pos.	Nation	Player
5	DF	JPN	Tatsuya Sakai (Drafted from National Institute of Fitness and Sports in Kanoya)
6	MF	COL	Jonathan (Transferred from (Colombia) Millonarios)
9	FW	BRA	Roni (loan from (Brazil) São Paulo FC)
13	DF	KOR	Kim Jung-Ya (loan from Gamba Osaka)
16	FW	COL	Diego (Transferred from (Colombia) Once Caldas)
23	MF	JPN	Toshiya Sueyoshi (Transferred from Avispa Fukuoka)
24	DF	JPN	Takashi Kanai (loan from Yokohama F. Marinos)
26	FW	JPN	Syuto Hira (Drafted from Saga east high school)
27	MF	JPN	Koki Kiyotake (Drafted from Fukuoka University)
29	DF	JPN	Shohei Kishida (Drafted from Fukuoka University)

Out: Note: Flags indicate national team as defined under FIFA eligibility rules; some limited exceptions apply. Players may hold more than one non-FIFA nationality.

No.	Pos.	Nation	Player
5	DF	KOR	Kim Kun-Hoan (loan return to Yokohama F. Marinos)
6	MF	JPN	Tomotaka Okamoto (loan return to Sanfrecce Hiroshima)
9	FW	BRA	Tozin (loan return to (Brazil) Corinthians Alagoano)
13	DF	JPN	Yusuke Inuzuka
16	FW	COL	Diego
23	DF	JPN	So Morita
24	DF	JPN	Kyohei Kuroki (loan to Ehime FC)
30	MF	JPN	Kohei Kuroki (loan to Roasso Kumamoto)

=== Summer ===
In: Note: Flags indicate national team as defined under FIFA eligibility rules; some limited exceptions apply. Players may hold more than one non-FIFA nationality.

No.	Pos.	Nation	Player
9	FW	JPN	Ryūji Bando (loan from Cerezo Osaka)
16	DF	BRA	Nilson (loan from (Brazil) Metropolitano)
33	GK	JPN	Akihiro Hayashi (loan from Shimizu S-Pulse)
36	MF	JPN	Naoya Kikuchi (loan from Albirex Niigata)

Out: Note: Flags indicate national team as defined under FIFA eligibility rules; some limited exceptions apply. Players may hold more than one non-FIFA nationality.

No.	Pos.	Nation	Player
2	DF	JPN	Kosuke Kitani (loan to FC Gifu)
7	MF	JPN	Keisuke Funatani (loan to Mito HollyHock)
9	FW	BRA	Roni

== Competitions ==
=== J.League ===
==== Results summary ====
Overall								Home						Away					
Pld	W	D	L	GF	GA	GD	Pts	W	D	L	GF	GA	GD	W	D	L	GF	GA	GD
34	13	7	14	54	63	−9	46	9	2	6	26	24	+2	4	5	8	28	39	−11

Last updated: 20 March 2015.
Source: Matches

==== Matches ====
2 March 2013 1	Sagan Tosu	1–1	Kashima Antlers	Tosu
14:00 JST (UTC+9)	Kim (yellow card) 51'; Takahashi (yellow card) 60'; Toyoda 71'; Okada (yellow card) 80'	Report	Osako (yellow card) 32'; Nishi (yellow card) 73'	Stadium: Best Amenity Stadium; Attendance: 12,728; Referee: Hiroyuki Kimura

9 March 2013 2	Shonan Bellmare	1–1	Sagan Tosu	Hiratsuka
19:00 JST (UTC+9)	Kajikawa 50'	Report	Noda 83'	Stadium: Shonan BMW Stadium Hiratsuka; Attendance: 11,439; Referee: Futoshi Nakamura

16 March 2013 3	Sagan Tosu	5–4	Kawasaki Frontale	Tosu
14:00 JST (UTC+9)	Ikeda 28' (yellow card) 42'; Kim 50'; Mizunuma 52'; Toyoda 54', 73'; Akahoshi (yellow card) 90+4'	Report	Tanaka (yellow card) 13'; Ōkubo 64'; Kobayashi 71'; Renatinho 83' (yellow card) 90+5'; Patric 87'	Stadium: Best Amenity Stadium; Attendance: 8,716; Referee: Jumpei Iida

30 March 2013 4	Júbilo Iwata	3–3	Sagan Tosu	Iwata
14:00 JST (UTC+9)	Yamada 45'; Matsuura 62'; Kanazono (yellow card) 71'; Jung (yellow card) 82'	Report	Toyoda 9', 35', 51'; Mizunuma (yellow card) 37'; Kobayashi (yellow card) 44'	Stadium: Yamaha Stadium; Attendance: 8,741; Referee: Ryuji Sato

6 April 2013 5	Sagan Tosu	0–1	Shimizu S-Pulse	Tosu
14:00 JST (UTC+9)	Toyoda (yellow card) 41'; Sueyoshi (yellow card) 90+1'	Report	Baré (yellow card) 45+2' (goal) 70'; Hayashi (yellow card) 90+2'	Stadium: Best Amenity Stadium; Attendance: 6,707; Referee: Hiroyoshi Takayama

14 April 2013 6	Sanfrecce Hiroshima	2–0	Sagan Tosu	Hiroshima
13:00 JST (UTC+9)	Satō 49', 59'; Morisaki (yellow card) 70'	Report	Takahashi (yellow card) 15'; Niwa (yellow card) 64'; Yeo (yellow card) 79'	Stadium: Hiroshima Big Arch; Attendance: 13,164; Referee: Yudai Yamamoto

20 April 2013 7	Sagan Tosu	0–3	Kashiwa Reysol	Tosu
15:00 JST (UTC+9)	Noda (yellow card) 26'; Fujita (yellow card) 81'	Report	Cléo 13' (yellow card) 71'; Kurisawa (yellow card) 41'; Masushima 73'; Kudo 76'	Stadium: Best Amenity Stadium; Attendance: 7,287; Referee: Minoru Tojo

28 April 2013 8	Vegalta Sendai	1–1	Sagan Tosu	Sendai
16:04 JST (UTC+9)	Kakuda (yellow card) 13'; Akamine 54'; Tamura (yellow card) 72'; Watanabe (yellow card) 90'	Report	Fujita 15' (yellow card) 90'	Stadium: Yurtec Stadium; Attendance: 14,359; Referee: Yuichi Nishimura

3 May 2013 9	Sagan Tosu	2–3	FC Tokyo	Tosu
18:04 JST (UTC+9)	Kim (yellow card) 56'; Toyoda 77'; Mizunuma 90+1'	Report	Higashi 28'; Watanabe 46', 49' (yellow card) 73'; Kaga (yellow card) 76'	Stadium: Best Amenity Stadium; Attendance: 14,024; Referee: Itaru Hirose

6 May 2013 10	Oita Trinita	2–4	Sagan Tosu	Ōita
16:00 JST (UTC+9)	Murai (yellow card) 33'; Komatsu 44'; Morishima 89' (pen.); Fukaya (yellow card) 90+1'	Report	Mizunuma (yellow card) 20'; Takahashi 29'; Toyoda (yellow card) 45+1' (goal) 48'; Noda 51'; Kodama 63' (o.g.)	Stadium: Ōita Bank Dome; Attendance: 16,760; Referee: Nobutsugu Murakami

11 May 2013 11	Sagan Tosu	1–3	Albirex Niigata	Tosu
14:00 JST (UTC+9)	Fujita (yellow card) 62'; Noda 63'	Report	Kawamata 2', 24', 66'	Stadium: Best Amenity Stadium; Attendance: 7,376; Referee: Toshimitsu Yoshida

18 May 2013 12	Urawa Red Diamonds	6–2	Sagan Tosu	Midori-ku
19:00 JST (UTC+9)	Abe 26'; Makino 49'; Koroki 65'; Kato (yellow card) 66'; Haraguchi 81'; Nasu 89'; Yajima 90+4'	Report	Yeo (yellow card) 24'; Okada 56'; Takahashi 66'; Ikeda (yellow card) 66'; Kanai (yellow card) 88'	Stadium: Saitama Stadium 2002; Attendance: 31,175; Referee: Futoshi Nakamura

25 May 2013 13	Sagan Tosu	0–1	Yokohama F. Marinos	Tosu
15:00 JST (UTC+9)	Okada (yellow card) 10'; Fujita (yellow card) 73'; Noda (yellow card) 76'	Report	Tomisawa 77'	Stadium: Best Amenity Stadium; Attendance: 13,197; Referee: Hajime Matsuo

6 July 2013 14	Omiya Ardija	1–1	Sagan Tosu	Saitama
19:00 JST (UTC+9)	Aoki 17'; Shimohira (yellow card) 69'	Report	Yeo (yellow card) 76'; Ikeda 83'	Stadium: NACK5 Stadium Omiya; Attendance: 12,449; Referee: Toma Iemoto

10 July 2013 15	Sagan Tosu	2–1	Ventforet Kofu	Tosu
19:00 JST (UTC+9)	Toyoda 60' (pen.), 90'	Report	Kawata (red card) 57'; Hugo (yellow card) 78'; Sasaki 81'	Stadium: Best Amenity Stadium; Attendance: 6,292; Referee: Toshimitsu Yoshida

13 July 2013 16	Nagoya Grampus	3–2	Sagan Tosu	Nagoya
19:00 JST (UTC+9)	Kennedy 12'; Tamada 61'; Tulio (yellow card) 63'; Nakamura (yellow card) 70'; Fujimoto 81'	Report	Noda 39'; Toyoda 64'	Stadium: Mizuho Athletic Stadium; Attendance: 9,237; Referee: Minoru Tojo

17 July 2013 17	Cerezo Osaka	4–1	Sagan Tosu	Osaka
19:00 JST (UTC+9)	Yamaguchi 6'; Fujimoto (yellow card) 66'; Sakemoto 69'; Yokoyama 78'; Yamashita 86'	Report	Fujita (yellow card) 18'; Noda (yellow card) 41'; Toyoda 73'; Kim (yellow card) 85'; Ikeda (yellow card) 88'	Stadium: Nagai Stadium; Attendance: 9,119; Referee: Tomohiro Inoue

31 July 2013 18	Sagan Tosu	3–2	Oita Trinita	Tosu
19:00 JST (UTC+9)	Ikeda 56'; Toyoda 60' (pen.); Nilson 76'	Report	Sakata (yellow card) 36' (goal) 40'; Takamatsu (yellow card) 44' (goal) 62'; Takagi (yellow card) 59'	Stadium: Best Amenity Stadium; Attendance: 10,304; Referee: Itaru Hirose

3 August 2013 19	Kashiwa Reysol	2–1	Sagan Tosu	Kashiwa
19:00 JST (UTC+9)	Barada (yellow card) 24'; Kudo 30', 65'	Report	Mizunuma (yellow card) 32'; Noda (yellow card) 62'; Nilson 88'	Stadium: Hitachi Kashiwa Soccer Stadium; Attendance: 8,815; Referee: Futoshi Nakamura

10 August 2013 20	Yokohama F. Marinos	2–1	Sagan Tosu	Yokohama
19:00 JST (UTC+9)	Kurihara (yellow card) 17'; Nakamura 23'; Kobayashi (yellow card) 66'; Marquinhos 76'	Report	Toyoda (yellow card) 52'; Hayasaka 56'	Stadium: International Stadium Yokohama; Attendance: 13,427; Referee: Masaaki Toma

17 August 2013 21	Sagan Tosu	2–1	Omiya Ardija	Tosu
19:00 JST (UTC+9)	Ikeda 57'; Toyoda 74'	Report	Cho 26'; Imai (yellow card) 77'	Stadium: Best Amenity Stadium; Attendance: 22,530; Referee: Hiroyoshi Takayama

24 August 2013 22	Sagan Tosu	1–0	Vegalta Sendai	Tosu
19:04 JST (UTC+9)	Mizunuma 26'; Nilson (yellow card) 90+5'	Summary	Kamata (yellow card) 73'	Stadium: Best Amenity Stadium; Attendance: 9,266; Referee: Nobutsugu Murakami

28 August 2013 23	FC Tokyo	2–3	Sagan Tosu	Tokyo
19:04 JST (UTC+9)	Tokunaga (yellow card) 66'; Hirayama 81' (yellow card) 89'; Watanabe 84'	Report	Toyoda 40', 85'; Ikeda 41' (yellow card) 61'; Hayashi (yellow card) 73'	Stadium: National Olympic Stadium; Attendance: 19,666; Referee: Hajime Matsuo

31 August 2013 24	Sagan Tosu	1–1	Nagoya Grampus	Tosu
19:00 JST (UTC+9)	Nilson (yellow card) 39'; Mizunuma 49'	Report	Daniel (yellow card) 26'; Masukawa 35'	Stadium: Best Amenity Stadium; Attendance: 15,569; Referee: Koichiro Fukushima

14 2013 25	Sagan Tosu	1–0	Shonan Bellmare	Tosu
19:00 JST (UTC+9)	Toyoda (yellow card) 20'; Shimomura 90' (o.g.)	Report	Kikuchi (yellow card) 12'; Han (yellow card) 40'	Stadium: Best Amenity Stadium; Attendance: 9,391; Referee: Takuya Maeda

21 September 2013 26	Kawasaki Frontale	0–1	Sagan Tosu	Kawasaki
19:00 JST (UTC+9)	Renatinho (yellow card) 26'; Jeci (yellow card) 75'; Igawa (yellow card) 84'	Report	Kanai 68'	Stadium: Todoroki Athletics Stadium; Attendance: 18,090; Referee: Yoshiro Imamura

28 September 2013 27	Sagan Tosu	0–2	Sanfrecce Hiroshima	Tosu
15:00 JST (UTC+9)	Kim (yellow card) 47'; Kikuchi (red card) 85'	Report	Satō 23'; Ishihara (yellow card) 30'; Yamagishi (yellow card) 85'; Notsuda 87' (pen.)	Stadium: Best Amenity Stadium; Attendance: 12,355; Referee: Yuichi Nishimura

5 October 2013 28	Albirex Niigata	3–1	Sagan Tosu	Niigata
15:30 JST (UTC+9)	Tanaka (yellow card) 19'; Mikado (yellow card) 27'; Naruoka 30'; Higashiguchi (yellow card) 39'; Kawaguchi (yellow card) 42'; Okamoto 69'; Fitzgerald (yellow card) 79'; Kawamata 80'	Report	Niwa (yellow card) 19'; Fujita (yellow card) 22'; Ikeda 39'; Isozaki (yellow card) 72'; Kobayashi (yellow card) 90+3'	Stadium: Denka Big Swan Stadium; Attendance: 26,514; Referee: Ryuji Sato

19 October 2013 29	Shimizu S-Pulse	6–4	Sagan Tosu	Shizuoka
15:00 JST (UTC+9)	Ito 6', 22', 88'; Jong-a-Pin (yellow card) 23'; Sugiyama 33'; Omae 42'; Kawai (yellow card) 56' (yellow-red card) 66'; Hiraoka 79'	Report	Kim 2', 53'; Toyoda 15'; Hayasaka 45+4'; Sakai (yellow card) 77'	Stadium: IAI Stadium Nihondaira; Attendance: 11,846; Referee: Nobutsugu Murakami

27 October 2013 30	Sagan Tosu	2–0	Cerezo Osaka	Tosu
19:00 JST (UTC+9)	Fujita 80' (yellow card) 90+4'; Kanai 90'	Report	Sugimoto (yellow card) 25'	Stadium: Best Amenity Stadium; Attendance: 17,382; Referee: Jumpei Iida

10 November 2013 31	Sagan Tosu	1–0	Júbilo Iwata	Tosu
16:00 JST (UTC+9)	Niwa 24'	Report	Yamada (yellow card) 43'; Yasuda (yellow card) 54'; Kanazono (yellow card) 85'	Stadium: Best Amenity Stadium; Attendance: 11,118; Referee: Yuichi Nishimura

23 November 2013 32	Kashima Antlers	1–2	Sagan Tosu	Kashima
14:00 JST (UTC+9)	Yamamura (yellow card) 28'; Aoki 84'; Ogasawara (yellow card) 86'; Davi (yellow card) 90+2'	Report	Kim 64', 90+5'; Kobayashi (yellow card) 87'; Isozaki (yellow card) 88'	Stadium: Kashima Soccer Stadium; Attendance: 17,030; Referee: Itaru Hirose

30 November 2013 33	Sagan Tosu	4–1	Urawa Red Diamonds	Tosu
14:00 JST (UTC+9)	Hayasaka 15'; Toyoda 37', 90' (pen.), 90+6'	Report	Nasu (yellow card) 31' (goal) 90+2'; Moriwaki (yellow card) 89'; Suzuki (yellow card) 89'	Stadium: Best Amenity Stadium; Attendance: 20,196; Referee: Hiroyoshi Takayama

7 December 2013 34	Ventforet Kofu	0–0	Sagan Tosu	Kōfu
15:30 JST (UTC+9)	Patric (yellow card) 61'	Report	Isozaki (yellow card) 17'; Niwa (yellow card) 70'; Fujita (yellow card) 89'	Stadium: Yamanashi Chuo Bank Stadium; Attendance: 11,742; Referee: Kenji Ogiya

==== League table ====
Pos	Team	Pld	W	D	L	GF	GA	GD	Pts
10	Kashiwa Reysol	34	13	9	12	56	59	−3	48
11	Nagoya Grampus	34	13	8	13	47	48	−1	47
12	Sagan Tosu	34	13	7	14	54	63	−9	46
13	Vegalta Sendai	34	11	12	11	41	38	+3	45
14	Omiya Ardija	34	14	3	17	45	48	−3	45

Updated to match(es) played on 7 December 2013. Source: J.League Division 1
Rules for classification: 1) points; 2) goal difference; 3) number of goals scored.

=== J.League Cup ===
==== Group stage ====
Team	Pld	W	D	L	GF	GA	GD	Pts
Cerezo Osaka	6	4	1	1	10	7	+3	13
Kashima Antlers	6	4	0	2	8	7	+1	12
FC Tokyo	6	2	3	1	7	5	+2	9
Nagoya Grampus	6	2	3	1	6	5	+1	9
Oita Trinita	6	1	3	2	6	7	−1	6
Sagan Tosu	6	1	1	4	6	8	−2	4
Albirex Niigata	6	1	1	4	6	10	−4	4

20 March 2013 1	FC Tokyo	0–0	Sagan Tosu	Setagaya
14:00 JST (UTC+9)		Report	Kanai (yellow card) 10'; Sueyoshi (yellow card) 90+1'	Stadium: Komazawa Park Stadium; Attendance: 11,039; Referee: Yuichi Nishimura

23 March 2013 2	Sagan Tosu	1–2	Nagoya Grampus	Tosu
16:00 JST (UTC+9)	Ikeda 19'; Kiyotake (yellow card) 47'	Report	Jakimovski 15' (yellow card) 83'; Taguchi (yellow card) 69'; Kisho Yano 75'	Stadium: Best Amenity Stadium; Attendance: 5,926; Referee: Toshimitsu Yoshida

3 April 2013 3	Kashima Antlers	1–0	Sagan Tosu	Kashima
19:00 JST (UTC+9)	Ogasawara (yellow card) 71'; Motoyama 90+1'	Report	Kishida (yellow card) 18'; Hira (yellow card) 83'	Stadium: Kashima Soccer Stadium; Attendance: 5,070; Referee: Nobutsugu Murakami

24 April 2013 4	Sagan Tosu	2–0	Albirex Niigata	Tosu
19:00 JST (UTC+9)	Kim (yellow card) 6'; Toyoda 61'; Hayasaka 90'	Report	Tsubouchi (yellow card) 10'; Silva (yellow card) 59'	Stadium: Best Amenity Stadium; Attendance: 3,640; Referee: Kenji Ogiya

15 May 2013 5	Cerezo Osaka	2–1	Sagan Tosu	Osaka
19:05 JST (UTC+9)	Maruhashi 72'; Minamino 86'	Report	Kanai 1'; Roni (yellow card) 45+2'; Sakai (yellow card) 47'; Isozaki (yellow card) 50'; Kiyotake (yellow card) 55'	Stadium: Kincho Stadium; Attendance: 6,941; Referee: Yosuke Kubota

22 May 2013 6	Sagan Tosu	2–3	Oita Trinita	Tosu
19:00 JST (UTC+9)	Ikeda 28'; Sakai (yellow card) 43'; Noda 71'; Kanai (yellow card) 82' (red card) 90+4'	Report	Marutani 59', 83', 87'; Matsubara (yellow card) 66'	Stadium: Best Amenity Stadium; Attendance: 4,322; Referee: Ryuji Sato

=== Emperor's Cup ===
8 September 2013 Second Round	Sagan Tosu	10–0	Saga University	Tosu
13:00 JST (UTC+9)	Noda 2', 37'; Okada 12', 26'; Kanai 24'; Yeo 28'; Ikeda 50'; Kiyotake 64', 67'; Bando 81'	Report		Stadium: Best Amenity Stadium; Attendance: 2,827; Referee: Kenji Ogiya

13 October 2013 Third Round	Matsumoto Yamaga	1–3 (a.e.t.)	Sagan Tosu	Matsumoto
13:00 JST (UTC+9)	Shiozawa 67'	Report	Takahashi 30'; Yeo (yellow card) 84'; Toyoda 114' (pen.), 117'	Stadium: Matsumotodaira Football Stadium; Attendance: 8,789; Referee: Takehiro Yamamoto

16 November 2013 Fourth Round	Cerezo Osaka	1–2	Sagan Tosu	Higashisumiyoshi-ku
17:00 JST (UTC+9)	Edno 22'; Simplício (yellow card) 84'	Report	Kanai 5'; Fujita (yellow card) 21'; Kanai (yellow card) 36'; Toyoda 87'	Stadium: Kincho Stadium; Attendance: 6,456; Referee: Hajime Matsuo

22 December 2013 Quarterfinal	Sagan Tosu	2–0 (a.e.t.)	Kawasaki Frontale	Tosu
15:04 JST (UTC+9)	Isozaki (yellow card) 72'; Niwa 100'; Mizunuma 112'	Report	Pinheiro (yellow card) 11'; Jeci (yellow card) 113'	Stadium: Best Amenity Stadium; Attendance: 11,123; Referee: Minoru Tōjō

29 December 2013 Semifinal	Yokohama F. Marinos	2–0	Sagan Tosu	Yokohama
13:06 JST (UTC+9)	Hyodo 86'; Fujita (yellow card) 90+3'; Nakamura 90+4'	Report	Niwa (yellow card) 85'	Stadium: Nissan Stadium; Attendance: 22,630; Referee: Hiroyoshi Takayama

== Squad statistics ==
=== Goal Scorers ===
Place	Position	Nation	Number	Name	J-League	J-League Cup	Emperor's Cup	Total
1	FW	(Japan)	11	Yohei Toyoda	20	1	3	24
2	FW	(Japan)	22	Kei Ikeda	6	2	1	9
3	FW	(Japan)	18	Ryunosuke Noda	4	1	2	7
4	MF	(South Korea)	10	Kim Min-woo	5	0	0	5
4	MF	(Japan)	8	Kota Mizunuma	4	0	1	5
6	MF	(Japan)	25	Ryota Hayasaka	3	1	0	4
6	DF	(Japan)	24	Takashi Kanai	2	1	2	4
8	MF	(Japan)	28	Yoshiki Takahashi	2	0	1	3
8	FW	(Japan)	19	Shohei Okada	1	0	2	3
10	MF	(Japan)	14	Naoyuki Fujita	2	0	0	2
10	MF	(Brazil)	16	Nilson	2	0	0	2
10				Own goal	2	0	0	2
10	MF	(Japan)	27	Koki Kiyotake	0	0	2	2
10	MF	(Japan)	15	Ryuhei Niwa	1	0	1	2
15	DF	(South Korea)	20	Yeo Sung-hye	0	0	1	1
15	FW	(Japan)	9	Ryūji Bando	0	0	1	1
				TOTALS	54	6	17	77

=== Disciplinary record ===
Number	Nation	Position	Name	J-League		J.League Cup		Emperor's Cup		Total	
Number	Nation	Position	Name	Yellow card	Red card	Yellow card	Red card	Yellow card	Red card	Yellow card	Red card
1	(Japan)	GK	Taku Akahoshi	1	0	0	0	0	0	1	0
3	(Japan)	DF	Keita Isozaki	3	0	1	0	1	0	5	0
4	(Japan)	DF	Teruaki Kobayashi	3	0	0	0	0	0	3	0
8	(Japan)	MF	Kota Mizunuma	3	0	0	0	0	0	3	0
9	(Japan)	DF	Tatsuya Sakai	1	0	2	0	0	0	3	0
9	(Brazil)	FW	Roni	0	0	1	0	0	0	1	0
10	(South Korea)	MF	Kim Min-woo	4	0	1	0	0	0	5	0
11	(Japan)	FW	Yohei Toyoda	4	0	0	0	0	0	4	0
14	(Japan)	MF	Naoyuki Fujita	8	0	0	0	1	0	9	0
15	(Japan)	MF	Ryuhei Niwa	3	0	0	0	1	0	3	0
16	(Brazil)	MF	Nilson	2	0	0	0	0	0	2	0
18	(Japan)	FW	Ryunosuke Noda	4	0	0	0	0	0	4	0
19	(Japan)	FW	Shohei Okada	2	0	0	0	0	0	2	0
20	(South Korea)	DF	Yeo Sung-hye	3	0	0	0	1	0	4	0
22	(Japan)	FW	Kei Ikeda	4	0	0	0	0	0	4	0
23	(Japan)	MF	Toshiya Sueyoshi	1	0	1	0	0	0	2	0
24	(Japan)	DF	Takashi Kanai	1	0	2	1	1	0	4	1
26	(Japan)	FW	Shūto Hira	0	0	1	0	0	0	1	0
27	(Japan)	MF	Koki Kiyotake	0	0	2	0	0	0	2	0
28	(Japan)	MF	Yoshiki Takahashi	2	0	0	0	0	0	2	0
29	(Japan)	DF	Shohei Kishida	0	0	1	0	0	0	1	0
33	(Japan)	GK	Akihiro Hayashi	1	0	0	0	0	0	1	0
36	(Japan)	MF	Naoya Kikuchi	0	1	0	0	0	0	0	1
			TOTALS	50	1	12	1	5	0	67	2
