= 2013 J.League Cup =

Yamazaki Nabisco Cup

Tournament details
- Country: Japan
- Teams: 18

Final positions
- Champions: Kashiwa Reysol (2nd title)
- Runners-up: Urawa Red Diamonds

Tournament statistics
- Matches played: 55
- Top goal scorer: Marquinhos (Yokohama F. Marinos) 7 goals

The 2013 J.League Cup, also known as the 2013 J.League Yamazaki Nabisco Cup for sponsoring purposes, was the 38th edition of the most prestigious Japanese soccer league cup tournament and the 21st edition under the current J.League Cup format.

== Format ==
Teams from the J.League Division 1 will take part in the tournament. Kashiwa Reysol, Sanfrecce Hiroshima, Urawa Red Diamonds and Vegalta Sendai were given a bye to the quarter-finals due to qualification in the 2013 AFC Champions League. The remaining 14 teams started from the group stage, where they were divided into two groups of seven. The group winners and the runners-up of each group qualified for the quarter-final along with the four teams which qualified for the AFC Champions League.

== Group stage ==
=== Standings ===
==== Group A ====
Team	Pld	W	D	L	GF	GA	GD	Pts
Yokohama F. Marinos	6	5	0	1	9	2	+7	15
Kawasaki Frontale	6	3	2	1	8	4	+4	11
Júbilo Iwata	6	3	1	2	10	7	+3	10
Shonan Bellmare	6	2	1	3	4	6	−2	7
Omiya Ardija	6	2	0	4	7	11	−4	6
Ventforet Kofu	6	1	2	3	6	9	−3	5
Shimizu S-Pulse	6	1	2	3	6	11	−5	5

==== Group B ====
Team	Pld	W	D	L	GF	GA	GD	Pts
Cerezo Osaka	6	4	1	1	10	7	+3	13
Kashima Antlers	6	4	0	2	8	7	+1	12
FC Tokyo	6	2	3	1	7	5	+2	9
Nagoya Grampus	6	2	3	1	6	5	+1	9
Oita Trinita	6	1	3	2	6	7	−1	6
Sagan Tosu	6	1	1	4	6	8	−2	4
Albirex Niigata	6	1	1	4	6	10	−4	4

=== Results ===
==== Group A ====
20 March 2013
Wednesday 13:04

Shimizu S-Pulse	1–1	Ventforet Kofu
Hattanda 9'; Lee Min-Soo (yellow card) 39'; Senuma (yellow card) 71'	Report	32' Hugo; (yellow card) 64' Kashiwa; (yellow card) 75' Kawamoto; (yellow card) 89' Choi Sung-Keun; (yellow card) 90+3' Tsuda

OUTSOURCING Stadium Nihondaira
Attendance: 9,411
Referee: Ryuji Sato
20 March 2013
Wednesday 16:00

Omiya Ardija	0–2	Júbilo Iwata
	Report	7' Kanazono; 22' Yamamoto

NACK5 Stadium
Attendance: 6,613
Referee: Yosuke Kubota
20 March 2013
Wednesday 17:00

Yokohama F. Marinos	1–0	Kawasaki Frontale
Fábio (yellow card) 14'; Nakamura (yellow card) 33'; Marquinhos 83', (yellow card) 67' (yellow-red card) 84'; Saitō (yellow card) 90'	Report	(yellow card) 53' Patrick; (yellow card) 81' Renato

Nippatsu Mitsuzawa Stadium
Attendance: 12,132
Referee: Masaaki Iemoto

23 March 2013
Saturday 13:03

Ventforet Kofu	0–2	Yokohama F. Marinos
Hugo (yellow card) 19'	Report	23' Hyodo; 52' Nakamachi

Yamanashi Chuo Bank Stadium
Attendance: 8,558
Referee: Hajime Matsuo
23 March 2013
Saturday 13:00

Júbilo Iwata	5–1	Shimizu S-Pulse
Kanazono 6'; Jung Woo-Young (yellow card) 18'; Matsuura 21'; Yamazaki 69', 75', 90'	Report	(yellow card) 5' Lee Min-Soo; 86' Ishige

Yamaha Stadium
Attendance: 10,690
Referee: Minoru Tōjō
23 March 2013
Saturday 16:00

Shonan Bellmare	1–3	Omiya Ardija
Kobayashi 62'; Kweon Han-Jin (yellow card) 63'	Report	(yellow card) 16' Imai; 30', (yellow card) 54' Tomiyama; 61' Hasegawa; 90+4' Watabe

Shonan BMW Stadium Hiratsuka
Attendance: 6,019
Referee: Nobutsugu Murakami

3 April 2013
Wednesday 19:00

Kawasaki Frontale	2–1	Júbilo Iwata
Ōkubo 44'; Yajima 52'	Report	(yellow card) 13' Cho Byung-Kuk; (yellow card) 41' Kobayashi; (yellow card) 64' Matsuura; 73' Kanazono; (yellow card) 81' Kanazawa; (yellow card) 90+1' Kanazono

Todoroki Athletics Stadium
Attendance: 7,449
Referee: Toshimitsu Yoshida
3 April 2013
Wednesday 19:00

Ventforet Kofu	0–1	Shonan Bellmare
Izawa (yellow card) 68'	Report	10' Taketomi; (yellow card) 43' Arabori; (yellow card) 81' Andō; (yellow card) 90+3' Kamata

Yamanashi Chuo Bank Stadium
Attendance: 5,923
Referee: Hiroyuki Kimura
3 April 2013
Wednesday 19:30

Yokohama F. Marinos	0–1	Omiya Ardija
Dutra (yellow card) 25'	Report	28' Cho Young-Cheol; (yellow card) 59' Kikuchi

Nippatsu Mitsuzawa Stadium
Attendance: 7,214
Referee: Takuto Okabe

10 April 2013
Wednesday 19:00

Omiya Ardija	1–3	Ventforet Kofu
Ljubijankič 51'	Report	24', 29' Kawamoto; 56' (pen.) Ortigoza; (yellow card) 64' Arai; (yellow card) 78' Choi Sung-Keun

NACK5 Stadium
Attendance: 3,958
Referee: Ryuji Sato
10 April 2013
Wednesday 19:00

Kawasaki Frontale	0–0	Shimizu S-Pulse
	Report	(yellow card) 34' Jong-a-Pin; (yellow card) 90' Yoshida

Todoroki Athletics Stadium
Attendance: 8,964
Referee: Nobutsugu Murakami
10 April 2013
Wednesday 19:00

Júbilo Iwata	1–0	Shonan Bellmare
Maeda 11'	Report

Yamaha Stadium
Attendance: 4,644
Referee: Yuichi Nishimura

23 April 2013
Tuesday 19:00

Omiya Ardija	2–3	Shimizu S-Pulse
Carlinhos (yellow card) 23'; Shimizu 52' (yellow card) 48'; Novaković 80'	Report	55', 83' Baré; 79' Hiraoka; (yellow card) 90+1' Ishige

NACK5 Stadium
Attendance: 4,276
Referee: Minoru Tōjō
24 April 2013
Wednesday 19:00

Shonan Bellmare	0–1	Yokohama F. Marinos
Shimamura (yellow card) 73'	Report	44' Marquinhos

Shonan BMW Stadium Hiratsuka
Attendance: 4,747
Referee: James Adcock
24 April 2013
Wednesday 19:00

Ventforet Kofu	1–3	Kawasaki Frontale
Ortigoza 43'	Report	33' Yajima; 50' Saneto; 81' Ōkubo

Yamanashi Chuo Bank Stadium
Attendance: 4,436
Referee: Stephen Martin

15 May 2013
Wednesday 19:00

Kawasaki Frontale	2–0	Omiya Ardija
Patrick 6', (yellow card) 68'; Renato 51', (yellow card) 74'	Report	(yellow card) 76' Shimizu

Todoroki Athletics Stadium
Attendance: 7,625
Referee: Hiroyuki Kimura
15 May 2013
Wednesday 19:04

Shimizu S-Pulse	0–1	Shonan Bellmare
Yoshida (yellow card) 25'	Report	8' Otsuki; (yellow card) 76' Abe

OUTSOURCING Stadium Nihondaira
Attendance: 6,261
Referee: Jumpei Iida
15 May 2013
Wednesday 19:30

Yokohama F. Marinos	3–0	Júbilo Iwata
Dutra (yellow card) 48'; Marquinhos (yellow card) 52', (goal) 62'; Kobayashi (yellow card) 65'; Saitō 77'; Nakamura 78'	Report	(yellow card) 21' Suganuma; (yellow card) 45' Inoha

Nippatsu Mitsuzawa Stadium
Attendance: 7,169
Referee: Kenji Ogiya

22 May 2013
Wednesday 19:00

Shonan Bellmare	1–1	Kawasaki Frontale
Kikuchi 40'		83' Kobayashi

Shonan BMW Stadium Hiratsuka
Attendance: 6,018
Referee: Fukushima
22 May 2013
Wednesday 19:00

Shimizu S-Pulse	1–2	Yokohama F. Marinos
Ishige 74'		44' Marquinhos; 68' Fujita

OUTSOURCING Stadium Nihondaira
Attendance: 6,782
Referee: Yoshida
22 May 2013
Wednesday 19:00

Júbilo Iwata	1–1	Ventforet Kofu
Komano 6'		30' Ortigoza

Yamaha Stadium
Attendance: 5,367
Referee: Yamamoto

==== Group B ====
20 March 2013
Wednesday 13:00

Albirex Niigata	1–1	Oita Trinita
Okamoto (yellow card) 1'; Hamada 37'	Report	29' Kijima; (yellow card) 85' Matsubara; (yellow card) 86' Tokita

Big Swan Stadium
Attendance: 12,369
Referee: Hiroyoshi Takayama
20 March 2013
Wednesday 14:00

FC Tokyo	0–0	Sagan Tosu
	Report	(yellow card) 10' Kanai; (yellow card) 90+1' Sueyoshi

Komazawa Park Stadium
Attendance: 11,039
Referee: Yuichi Nishimura
20 March 2013
Wednesday 16:00

Nagoya Grampus	1–1	Cerezo Osaka
Isomura (yellow card) 22'; Tamada 68'	Report	(yellow card) 45+1' Edno; 47' (o.g.) Honda

Mizuho Athletic Stadium
Attendance: 8,032
Referee: Koichiro Fukushima

23 March 2013
Saturday 13:00

Oita Trinita	1–2	Cerezo Osaka
Marutani 64'; Morishima (yellow card) 88'	Report	1' Minamino; (yellow card) 57' Mukuhara; 75' Yamaguchi

Ōita Stadium
Attendance: 6,957
Referee: Jumpei Iida
23 March 2013
Saturday 16:00

Kashima Antlers	2–4	FC Tokyo
Endo (yellow card) 27'; Osako 28'; Davi 78'; Maeno (yellow card) 89'	Report	(yellow card) 19', (goal) 57' Lucas; 45+1' Watanabe; 77' Lee; 81' Higashi

Kashima Soccer Stadium
Attendance: 11,839
Referee: Yudai Yamamoto
23 March 2013
Saturday 16:00

Sagan Tosu	1–2	Nagoya Grampus
Ikeda 19'; Kiyotake (yellow card) 47'	Report	15', (yellow card) 83' Jakimovski; (yellow card) 69' Taguchi; 75' Kisho Yano

Best Amenity Stadium
Attendance: 5,926
Referee: Toshimitsu Yoshida

3 April 2013
Wednesday 19:00

Kashima Antlers	1–0	Sagan Tosu
Ogasawara (yellow card) 71'; Motoyama 90+1'	Report	(yellow card) 18' Kishida; (yellow card) 83' Hira

Kashima Soccer Stadium
Attendance: 5,070
Referee: Nobutsugu Murakami
3 April 2013
Wednesday 19:00

FC Tokyo	0–0	Nagoya Grampus
Hirayama (yellow card) 72'	Report	(yellow card) 85' Tanaka

Ajinomoto Stadium
Attendance: 9,900
Referee: Hajime Matsuo
3 April 2013
Wednesday 19:00

Albirex Niigata	2–1	Cerezo Osaka
Mikado (yellow card) 17'; Homma (yellow card) 32'; Tsubouchi (yellow card) 63'; Okamoto 61', 85'; Kim Jin-Su (yellow card) 90+2'	Report	(red card) 12' Yamashita; 30' Kakitani

Big Swan Stadium
Attendance: 7,320
Referee: Kenji Ogiya

10 April 2013
Wednesday 19:00

Albirex Niigata	1–2	Kashima Antlers
Kawamata 87'; Silva (yellow card) 76'	Report	29', 41', (yellow card) 71' Davi; (yellow card) 57' Endo; (yellow card) 60' Ogasawara; (yellow card) 62' Motoyama

Big Swan Stadium
Attendance: 7,210
Referee: Jumpei Iida
10 April 2013
Wednesday 19:00

Nagoya Grampus	1–1	Oita Trinita
Masukawa (yellow card) 39'; Tanaka 61' (pen.); Tanaka (yellow card) 67'	Report	19' Morishima; (yellow card) 45' Tokita

Mizuho Athletic Stadium
Attendance: 4,601
Referee: Yudai Yamamoto
10 April 2013
Wednesday 19:00

Cerezo Osaka	2–1	FC Tokyo
Kakitani 55'; Simplício 69'; Edno (yellow card) 77'; Bando (yellow card) 89' (yellow-red card) 90+2'	Report	61' Lee; (yellow card) 64' Watanabe

Nagai Stadium
Attendance: 7,296
Referee: Yosuke Kubota

24 April 2013
Wednesday 19:00

Kashima Antlers	1–0	Nagoya Grampus
Juninho 23'; Shibasaki (yellow card) 51'; Iwamasa (yellow card) 59' (yellow-red card) 87'; Nakata (yellow card) 90+1'	Report	(yellow card) 36' Isomura; (yellow card) 69' Daniel

Kashima Soccer Stadium
Attendance: 4,375
Referee: Hajime Matsuo
24 April 2013
Wednesday 19:00

Sagan Tosu	2–0	Albirex Niigata
Kim Min-Woo (yellow card) 6'; Toyoda 61'; Hayasaka 90'	Report	(yellow card) 10' Tsubouchi; (yellow card) 59' Silva

Best Amenity Stadium
Attendance: 3,640
Referee: Kenji Ogiya
24 April 2013
Wednesday 19:00

Oita Trinita	0–0	FC Tokyo
Hayashi (yellow card) 33'; Choi Jung-Han (yellow card) 67'; Kijima (yellow card) 80'	Report	(yellow card) 64' Hirayama; (yellow card) 79' Jang Hyun-Soo

Ōita Stadium
Attendance: 4,623
Referee: Jumpei Iida

15 May 2013
Wednesday 19:04

FC Tokyo	2–1	Albirex Niigata
Ishikawa 51'; Mita 82'	Report	(yellow card) 55' Hamada; 65' Okamoto; (yellow card) 86' Homma; (yellow card) 90+1' Tanaka

National Olympic Stadium
Attendance: 12,724
Referee: Masaaki Iemoto
15 May 2013
Wednesday 19:05

Cerezo Osaka	2–1	Sagan Tosu
Maruhashi 72'; Minamino 86'	Report	1' Kanai; (yellow card) 45+2' Roni; (yellow card) 47' Sakai; (yellow card) 50' Isozaki; (yellow card) 55' Kiyotake

Kincho Stadium
Attendance: 6,941
Referee: Yosuke Kubota
15 May 2013
Wednesday 19:30

Oita Trinita	0–1	Kashima Antlers
Wakasa (yellow card) 12'; Nagayoshi (yellow card) 70'	Report	90+5' Osako

Ōita Stadium
Attendance: 4,563
Referee: Koichiro Fukushima

22 May 2013
Wednesday 19:00

Nagoya Grampus	2–1	Albirex Niigata
Own-Goal 3'; Tamada 24'		41' Léo Silva

Mizuho Athletic Stadium
Attendance: 4,106
Referee: Maeda
22 May 2013
Wednesday 19:00

Cerezo Osaka	2–1	Kashima Antlers
Edno 2'; Kakitani 36'		21' Davi

Kincho Stadium
Attendance: 10,336
Referee: Okabe
22 May 2013
Wednesday 19:00

Sagan Tosu	2–3	Oita Trinita
Ikeda 28'; Noda 71'		59', 83', 87' Marutani

Best Amenity Stadium
Attendance: 4,322
Referee: Sato

== Knock-out stage ==
All times are Japan Standard Time (UTC+9)

Quarterfinals
Cerezo Osaka	0	1	1
Urawa Reds	2	1	3
Kawasaki Frontale	2	3	5
Vegalta Sendai	1	2	3
Yokohama F. Marinos	2	3	5
Kashima Antlers	0	1	1
Sanfrecce Hiroshima	1	1	2
Kashiwa Reysol	2	0	2

Semifinals
Urawa Reds	2	1	3
Kawasaki Frontale	3	0	3
Yokohama F. Marinos	0	2	2
Kashiwa Reysol	4	0	4

Finals
Urawa Reds	0
Kashiwa Reysol	1

=== Quarter-finals ===
==== First leg ====
2013-06-23
18:04

Kashima Antlers	0–2	Yokohama F. Marinos
		18' Nakamura; 79' Marquinhos

Kashima Soccer Stadium, Kashima
Attendance: 13,099
Referee: Murakami

2013-06-23
18:00

Kawasaki Frontale	2–1	Vegalta Sendai
Kobayashi 36'; Renato 77'		90+3' Matsushita

Kawasaki Todoroki Stadium, Kawasaki
Attendance: 10,711
Referee: Matsuo

2013-06-23
19:04

Cerezo Osaka	0–2	Urawa Reds
		9', 56' Koroki

Nagai Stadium, Osaka
Attendance: 16,602
Referee: Iemoto

2013-06-23
19:03

Sanfrecce Hiroshima	1–2	Kashiwa Reysol
Takahagi 59'		55' Tanaka; 61' Kudo

EDION Stadium Hiroshima, Hiroshima
Attendance: 9,427
Referee: Kimura

==== Second leg ====
2013-06-30
19:00

Yokohama F. Marinos	3–1	Kashima Antlers
Saitō 39'; Marquinhos 59'; Narawa 90'		65' Davi

Nissan Stadium, Yokohama
Attendance: 14,038
Referee: Ogiya

2013-06-30
18:04

Vegalta Sendai	2–3	Kawasaki Frontale
Wilson 4', 68'		10', 41' Nakamura; 50' Moriya

Yurtec Stadium Sendai, Sendai
Attendance: 11,176
Referee: Sato

2013-06-30
18:00

Urawa Reds	1–1	Cerezo Osaka
Umesaki 34'		6' Minamino

Saitama Stadium 2002, Saitama
Attendance: 22,743
Referee: Iida

2013-06-30
19:00

Kashiwa Reysol	0–1	Sanfrecce Hiroshima
		59' Sato

Hitachi Kashiwa Stadium, Kashiwa
Attendance: 7,775
Referee: Tojo

=== Semi-finals ===
==== First leg ====
2013-06-23
18:00

Kawasaki Frontale	3–2	Urawa Reds
Renato 67'; Ōkubo 79', 80'		45', 47' Koroki

Kawasaki Todoroki Stadium, Kawasaki
Attendance: 19,193
Referee: Kimura

2013-09-07
19:04

Kashiwa Reysol	4–0	Yokohama F. Marinos
Tanaka 18', 44'; Jorge Wagner 45+2', 85'

Hitachi Kashiwa Stadium, Kashiwa
Attendance: 10,532
Referee: Yoshida

==== Second leg ====
2013-10-12
13:00

Yokohama F. Marinos	2–0	Kashiwa Reysol
Marquinhos 32'; Sato 45+3'

NHK Mitsuzawa Stadium, Yokohama
Attendance: 10,071
Referee: Iemoto

2013-10-12
17:00

Urawa Reds	1–0	Kawasaki Frontale
Koroki 80'

Saitama Stadium 2002, Saitama
Attendance: 27,197
Referee: Nishimura

=== Final ===
2013-11-02
13:10

Urawa Reds	0–1	Kashiwa Reysol
	Summary	45+2' Kudo

Tokyo National Stadium, Shinjuku, Tokyo
Attendance: 46,675
Referee: Ogiya

== Goalscorers ==
Rank	Name	Team	Goals
1	(Brazil) Marquinhos	Yokohama F. Marinos	7
2	(Brazil) Davi	Kashima Antlers	5
2	(Japan) Shinzo Koroki	Urawa Reds	5
3	(Japan) Yoshito Ōkubo	Kawasaki Frontale	4
3	(Japan) Takuya Marutani	Oita Trinita	4
