= Teruaki Kobayashi =

Japanese footballer (born 1979)

Teruaki Kobayashi 小林 久晃
Personal information
- Full name: Teruaki Kobayashi
- Date of birth: June 20, 1979 (age 47)
- Place of birth: Tokai, Ibaraki, Japan
- Height: 1.85 m (6 ft 1 in)
- Position: Defender

Youth career
- 1995–1997: Hasaki Yanagawa High School
- 1998–2001: Komazawa University

Senior career*
Years	Team	Apps	(Gls)
2002–2003	JEF United Ichihara	0	(0)
2003–2005	Montedio Yamagata	79	(5)
2006–2010	Vissel Kobe	60	(1)
2011	Ventforet Kofu	11	(0)
2012–2016	Sagan Tosu	63	(3)
Total		213	(9)
- * Club domestic league appearances and goals

Teruaki Kobayashi (小林 久晃, Kobayashi Teruaki; born June 20, 1979) is a former Japanese football player.

== Playing career ==
Kobayashi was born in Tokai, Ibaraki on June 20, 1979. After graduating from Komazawa University, he joined J1 League club JEF United Ichihara in 2002. However he could not play at all in the match. In August 2003, he moved to J2 League club Montedio Yamagata. He became a regular player as center back in October. In 2004, he played all 43 matches except 1 match for suspension as center back with Leonardo. However his opportunity to play decreased behind Shogo Kobara. In 2006, he moved to J2 club Vissel Kobe. Although Vissel was promoted to J1 end of 2006 season, he could not play many matches. In 2008, he became a regular center back. However his opportunity to play decreased from 2009. In 2011, he moved to Ventforet Kofu. In 2012, he moved to Sagan Tosu. Although he played many matches as center back in 2012, his opportunity to play decreased year by year from 2013. He retired at the end of the 2016 season.

== Club statistics ==
Club performance			League		Cup		League Cup		Total	
Season	Club	League	Apps	Goals	Apps	Goals	Apps	Goals	Apps	Goals
Japan			League		Emperor's Cup		J.League Cup		Total	
2002	JEF United Ichihara	J1 League	0	0	0	0	0	0	0	0
2003	JEF United Ichihara	J1 League	0	0	0	0	0	0	0	0
Total			0	0	0	0	0	0	0	0
2003	Montedio Yamagata	J2 League	9	1	2	0	-		11	1
2004	Montedio Yamagata	J2 League	43	2	2	0	-		45	2
2005	Montedio Yamagata	J2 League	27	2	2	0	-		29	2
Total			79	5	6	0	-		85	5
2006	Vissel Kobe	J2 League	8	0	1	0	-		9	0
2007	Vissel Kobe	J1 League	5	0	1	0	4	0	10	0
2008	Vissel Kobe	J1 League	23	1	2	0	5	0	30	1
2009	Vissel Kobe	J1 League	12	0	3	0	2	1	17	1
2010	Vissel Kobe	J1 League	12	0	1	0	3	0	16	0
Total			60	1	8	0	14	1	82	2
2011	Ventforet Kofu	J1 League	11	0	1	0	2	0	14	0
Total			11	0	1	0	2	0	14	0
2012	Sagan Tosu	J1 League	26	2	0	0	2	0	28	2
2013	Sagan Tosu	J1 League	20	0	2	0	2	0	24	0
2014	Sagan Tosu	J1 League	11	1	3	0	1	0	15	1
2015	Sagan Tosu	J1 League	4	0	2	0	3	0	9	0
2016	Sagan Tosu	J1 League	2	0	0	0	0	0	2	0
Total			63	3	7	0	8	0	78	3
Career total			213	9	22	0	24	1	259	10
