= Yoshiki Takahashi =

Yoshiki Takahashi may refer to:

- Yoshiki Takahashi (footballer) (高橋 義希, born 1985), Japanese footballer
- Yoshiki Takahashi (高橋 義生), ring name of Kazuo Takahashi (born 1969), Japanese mixed martial artist
