= Keita Isozaki =

Japanese footballer

Keita Isozaki 磯崎 敬太
Personal information
- Full name: Keita Isozaki
- Date of birth: 17 November 1980 (age 45)
- Place of birth: Odawara, Japan
- Height: 1.80 m (5 ft 11 in)
- Position: Defender

Youth career
- 1996–1998: Bellmare Hiratsuka

Senior career*
Years	Team	Apps	(Gls)
1999–2000	Shonan Bellmare	10	(0)
2001–2004	Mito HollyHock	82	(4)
2005–2008	Vegalta Sendai	105	(1)
2009–2016	Sagan Tosu	128	(0)
Total		325	(5)
- * Club domestic league appearances and goals

Keita Isozaki (磯崎 敬太, Isozaki Keita; born 17 November 1980) is a former Japanese football player.

== Career statistics ==
Appearances and goals by club, season and competition
Club	Season	League			Emperor's Cup		J.League Cup		Total	
Club	Season	Division	Apps	Goals	Apps	Goals	Apps	Goals	Apps	Goals
Bellmare Hiratsuka	1999	J1 League	6	0	0	0	0	0	6	0
Shonan Bellmare	2000	J2 League	4	0	0	0	1	0	5	0
Mito HollyHock	2001	J2 League	25	0	0	0	2	0	27	0
Mito HollyHock	2002	J2 League	6	0	0	0	—		6	0
Mito HollyHock	2003	J2 League	17	0	1	0	—		18	0
Mito HollyHock	2004	J2 League	34	4	2	0	—		36	4
Vegalta Sendai	2005	J2 League	21	0	1	0	—		22	0
Vegalta Sendai	2006	J2 League	42	1	2	0	—		44	1
Vegalta Sendai	2007	J2 League	31	0	0	0	—		31	0
Vegalta Sendai	2008	J2 League	11	0	2	0	—		13	0
Sagan Tosu	2009	J2 League	35	0	2	0	—		37	0
Sagan Tosu	2010	J2 League	19	0	2	0	—		21	0
Sagan Tosu	2011	J2 League	35	0	0	0	—		35	0
Sagan Tosu	2012	J1 League	26	0	1	0	4	0	31	0
Sagan Tosu	2013	J1 League	9	0	4	0	4	0	17	0
Sagan Tosu	2014	J1 League	2	0	0	0	3	0	5	0
Sagan Tosu	2015	J1 League	2	0	0	0	3	0	5	0
Sagan Tosu	2016	J1 League	0	0	0	0	1	0	1	0
Career total			325	5	17	0	18	0	360	5
