= Koki Otani =

Japanese footballer

Koki Otani 大谷 幸輝
Personal information
- Full name: Koki Otani
- Date of birth: 8 April 1989 (age 37)
- Place of birth: Kumamoto, Japan
- Height: 1.87 m (6 ft 2 in)
- Position: Goalkeeper

Team information
- Current team: Giravanz Kitakyushu
- Number: 31

Youth career
- 2005–2007: Urawa Red Diamonds

Senior career*
Years	Team	Apps	(Gls)
2008–2016	Urawa Red Diamonds	0	(0)
2014	→ Giravanz Kitakyushu (loan)	42	(0)
2017–2020	Albirex Niigata	79	(0)
2021–2023	Hokkaido Consadole Sapporo	7	(0)
2024-	Giravanz Kitakyushu	9	(0)
Medal record
Urawa Red Diamonds
Runner-up	J1 League	2016
Winner	J.League Cup	2016
Runner-up	J.League Cup	2011
Runner-up	J.League Cup	2013
Runner-up	Emperor's Cup	2015
- * Club domestic league appearances and goals as of 24 August 2026

Koki Otani (大谷 幸輝, Ōtani Kōki; born 8 April 1989 in Kumamoto) is a Japanese professional footballer who plays as a goalkeeper for J3 League club Giravanz Kitakyushu.

== Early life ==
Koki was born in Kumamoto. He played for Urawa Reds' youth team.

== Career ==
Koki started his career at Urawa Reds.

Koki made his debut for Giravanz Kitakyushu on 2 March 2014 against Kyoto Sanga.

Koki made his debut for Albirex against Yokohama F. Marinos on 18 March 2017.

Koki made his debut for Consadole against Cerezo Osaka on 19 March 2022.

== Career statistics ==
As of match played 3 December 2023

Appearances and goals by club, season and competition
Club	Season	League			Emperor's Cup		J.League Cup		AFC		Total	
Club	Season	Division	Apps	Goals	Apps	Goals	Apps	Goals	Apps	Goals	Apps	Goals
Giravanz Kitakyushu (loan)	2014	J2 League	42	0	4	0	–		–		46	0
Urawa Red Diamonds	2015	J1 League	0	0	1	0	2	0	1	0	4	0
Urawa Red Diamonds	2016	J1 League	0	0	1	0	4	0	0	0	5	0
Urawa Red Diamonds	Total		0	0	2	0	6	0	1	0	9	0
Albirex Niigata	2017	J1 League	23	0	0	0	1	0	–		24	0
Albirex Niigata	2018	J2 League	14	0	2	0	3	0	–		19	0
Albirex Niigata	2019	J2 League	42	0	0	0	0	0	–		42	0
Albirex Niigata	2020	J2 League	0	0	–		–		–		0	0
Albirex Niigata	Total		79	0	2	0	4	0	0	0	85	0
Hokkaido Consadole Sapporo	2021	J1 League	0	0	0	0	4	0	–		4	0
Hokkaido Consadole Sapporo	2022	J1 League	4	0	2	0	1	0	–		7	0
Hokkaido Consadole Sapporo	2023	J1 League	3	0	3	0	2	0	–		8	0
Hokkaido Consadole Sapporo	Total		7	0	5	0	7	0	0	0	19	0
Career total			128	0	13	0	17	0	1	0	159	0
