= Nilson (footballer, born 1989) =

Brazilian footballer

Personal information
- Full name: Nilson Ricardo da Silva Junior
- Date of birth: March 31, 1989 (age 37)
- Place of birth: Recife, Brazil
- Height: 1.84 m (6 ft 0 in)
- Position: Defensive midfielder

Team information
- Current team: Bucheon FC 1995
- Number: 6

Youth career
- Náutico

Senior career*
Years	Team	Apps	(Gls)
2009–2011	Náutico	44	(1)
2012	Araripina	7	(2)
2013	Itabaiana	17	(1)
2013	Metropolitano	2	(0)
2013	Sagan Tosu	16	(2)
2014–2015	Busan IPark	39	(2)
2016	Salgueiro	10	(1)
2016	Busan IPark	21	(1)
2017–2019	Bucheon FC	99	(15)
2020–2021	FC Anyang	58	(5)
2022–	Bucheon FC	87	(13)
- * Club domestic league appearances and goals as of 26 January 2022

Nilson Ricardo da Silva Junior (born 31 March 1989), or simply Nilson, is a Brazilian footballer who plays for Bucheon FC as a defensive midfielder.

== Career ==
He joined J1 League side Sagan Tosu in July 2013 and moved to Busan IPark in South Korea in 2014. In his first season with the Korean side, Nilson played initially as a defensive midfielder, but later took the central role in a three-man defence. After a stint with Brazilian side Salgueiro, Nilson returned to Busan IPark in 2016 following their relegation to the K League 2.
