= Yudai Tanaka (footballer, born 1988) =

Japanese footballer

Yudai Tanaka 田中 雄大
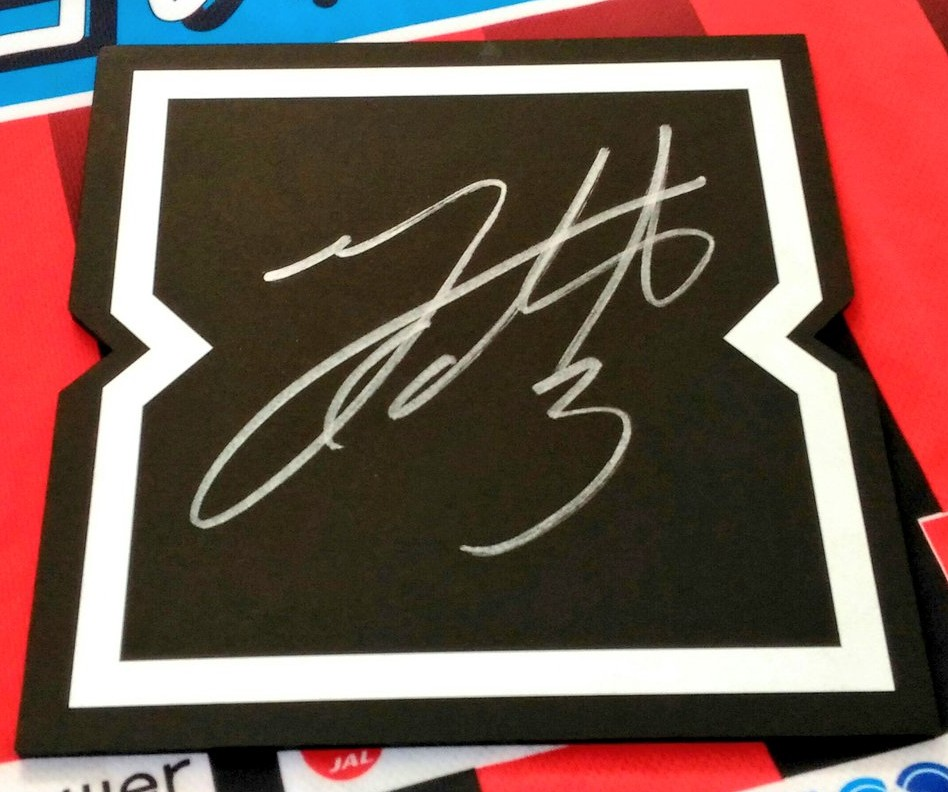

Personal information
- Full name: Yudai Tanaka
- Date of birth: August 8, 1988 (age 38)
- Place of birth: Yasu, Shiga, Japan
- Height: 1.68 m (5 ft 6 in)
- Position: Defender

Youth career
- 2004–2006: Yasu High School

College career
Years	Team	Apps	(Gls)
2007–2010	Kansai University		

Senior career*
Years	Team	Apps	(Gls)
2011–2012	Kawasaki Frontale	9	(0)
2012	Tochigi SC	4	(0)
2013	Gainare Tottori	33	(2)
2014–2015	Mito Hollyhock	73	(4)
2016	Vissel Kobe	9	(0)
2017–2018	Hokkaido Consadole Sapporo	6	(0)
2019–2020	Blaublitz Akita	17	(1)
- * Club domestic league appearances and goals as of 7 December 2020

Yudai Tanaka (田中 雄大, Tanaka Yūdai; born August 8, 1988) is a Japanese former football player who last played for Blaublitz Akita.

== Career ==
=== Blaublitz Akita ===
Tanaka signed with Blaublitz Akita for the 2019 season.

== Career statistics ==
Updated to 31 December 2020.

Appearances and goals by club, season and competition
Club	Season	League			Emperor's Cup		J.League Cup		Total	
Club	Season	Division	Apps	Goals	Apps	Goals	Apps	Goals	Apps	Goals
Kawasaki Frontale	2011	J1 League	6	0	0	0	2	0	8	0
Kawasaki Frontale	2012	J1 League	3	0	—		2	0	5	0
Tochigi SC	2012	J2 League	4	0	1	0	—		5	0
Gainare Tottori	2013	J2 League	33	2	1	0	—		33	2
Mito Hollyhock	2014	J2 League	31	3	1	0	—		32	3
Mito Hollyhock	2015	J2 League	42	1	2	0	—		0	0
Vissel Kobe	2016	J1 League	9	0	0	0	3	1	12	1
Hokkaido Consadole Sapporo	2017	J1 League	6	0	1	0	3	0	10	0
Hokkaido Consadole Sapporo	2018	J1 League	0	0	1	0	4	0	5	0
Blaublitz Akita	2019	J3 League	17	1	0	0	—		17	1
Blaublitz Akita	2020	J3 League	0	0	0	0	—		0	0
Career total			151	7	9	0	14	1	174	8

== Honours ==
Blaublitz Akita

- J3 League (1): 2020
