= 2016 Sagan Tosu season =

Sagan Tosu
2016 season
- Manager: Massimo Ficcadenti
- Stadium: Best Amenity Stadium
- J1 League: 11th

2016 Sagan Tosu season.

== J1 League ==
=== League table ===
Pos	Team	Pld	W	D	L	GF	GA	GD	Pts
9	FC Tokyo	34	15	7	12	39	39	0	52
10	Yokohama F. Marinos	34	13	12	9	53	38	+15	51
11	Sagan Tosu	34	12	10	12	36	37	−1	46
12	Vegalta Sendai	34	13	4	17	39	48	−9	43
13	Júbilo Iwata	34	8	12	14	37	50	−13	36

Source: Meiji Yasuda J1 League
Rules for classification: 1) Points; 2) Goal difference; 3) Goals scored.

=== Match details ===
J1 League match details
Match	Date	Team	Score	Team	Venue	Attendance
1–1	2016.02.27	Sagan Tosu	2–1	Avispa Fukuoka	Best Amenity Stadium	19,762
1–2	2016.03.05	Kashima Antlers	1–0	Sagan Tosu	Kashima Soccer Stadium	19,696
1–3	2016.03.12	Sagan Tosu	1–1	Ventforet Kofu	Best Amenity Stadium	8,697
1–4	2016.03.19	Yokohama F. Marinos	2–1	Sagan Tosu	NHK Spring Mitsuzawa Football Stadium	10,436
1–5	2016.04.02	Sagan Tosu	1–1	Kashiwa Reysol	Best Amenity Stadium	9,144
1–6	2016.04.10	Kawasaki Frontale	1–0	Sagan Tosu	Kawasaki Todoroki Stadium	18,402
1–8	2016.04.24	Sagan Tosu	0–1	Júbilo Iwata	Best Amenity Stadium	9,332
1–9	2016.04.30	Vegalta Sendai	0–2	Sagan Tosu	Yurtec Stadium Sendai	14,032
1–10	2016.05.04	Sagan Tosu	0–1	Shonan Bellmare	Best Amenity Stadium	20,219
1–11	2016.05.08	Sanfrecce Hiroshima	3–0	Sagan Tosu	Edion Stadium Hiroshima	16,733
1–12	2016.05.13	FC Tokyo	0–0	Sagan Tosu	Ajinomoto Stadium	13,046
1–13	2016.05.21	Sagan Tosu	0–1	Omiya Ardija	Best Amenity Stadium	7,729
1–14	2016.05.29	Sagan Tosu	0–0	Urawa Reds	Best Amenity Stadium	13,380
1–7	2016.06.02	Sagan Tosu	0–0	Vissel Kobe	Best Amenity Stadium	6,499
1–15	2016.06.11	Nagoya Grampus	0–1	Sagan Tosu	Paloma Mizuho Stadium	7,980
1–16	2016.06.18	Sagan Tosu	2–1	Gamba Osaka	Best Amenity Stadium	14,450
1–17	2016.06.25	Albirex Niigata	1–0	Sagan Tosu	Denka Big Swan Stadium	19,055
2–1	2016.07.02	Sagan Tosu	3–2	FC Tokyo	Best Amenity Stadium	9,858
2–2	2016.07.09	Vissel Kobe	2–2	Sagan Tosu	Noevir Stadium Kobe	13,008
2–3	2016.07.13	Shonan Bellmare	0–2	Sagan Tosu	Shonan BMW Stadium Hiratsuka	9,079
2–4	2016.07.17	Sagan Tosu	0–0	Nagoya Grampus	Best Amenity Stadium	10,618
2–5	2016.07.23	Avispa Fukuoka	2–3	Sagan Tosu	Level5 Stadium	19,370
2–6	2016.07.30	Sagan Tosu	1–0	Kashima Antlers	Best Amenity Stadium	12,803
2–7	2016.08.06	Gamba Osaka	2–1	Sagan Tosu	Suita City Football Stadium	17,355
2–8	2016.08.13	Sagan Tosu	1–0	Kawasaki Frontale	Best Amenity Stadium	19,477
2–9	2016.08.20	Júbilo Iwata	1–1	Sagan Tosu	Yamaha Stadium	11,238
2–10	2016.08.27	Sagan Tosu	1–0	Albirex Niigata	Best Amenity Stadium	14,208
2–11	2016.09.10	Urawa Reds	2–0	Sagan Tosu	Saitama Stadium 2002	28,167
2–12	2016.09.17	Sagan Tosu	2–3	Sanfrecce Hiroshima	Best Amenity Stadium	12,068
2–13	2016.09.25	Omiya Ardija	1–1	Sagan Tosu	NACK5 Stadium Omiya	11,807
2–14	2016.10.01	Sagan Tosu	2–3	Vegalta Sendai	Best Amenity Stadium	9,894
2–15	2016.10.22	Kashiwa Reysol	2–3	Sagan Tosu	Hitachi Kashiwa Stadium	10,140
2–16	2016.10.29	Sagan Tosu	2–2	Yokohama F. Marinos	Best Amenity Stadium	16,676
2–17	2016.11.03	Ventforet Kofu	0–1	Sagan Tosu	Yamanashi Chuo Bank Stadium	14,676
