= Shohei Okada =

Japanese footballer (born 1989)

Shohei Okada 岡田 翔平
Personal information
- Full name: Shohei Okada
- Date of birth: 29 April 1989 (age 37)
- Place of birth: Kawasaki, Kanagawa, Japan
- Height: 1.68 m (5 ft 6 in)
- Position: Forward

Team information
- Current team: Nankatsu SC
- Number: 9

Youth career
- 1999–2001: Kunimoto SC
- 2002–2007: FC Tokyo

College career
Years	Team	Apps	(Gls)
2008–2011	NIFS Kanoya		

Senior career*
Years	Team	Apps	(Gls)
2011–2016	Sagan Tosu	59	(2)
2014–2015	→ Shonan Bellmare (loan)	38	(14)
2017–2020	Thespakusatsu Gunma	64	(12)
2021–	Nankatsu SC	25	(2)
- * Club domestic league appearances and goals as of 18:49, 9 October 2022 (UTC)

Shohei Okada (岡田 翔平, Okada Shohei; born 29 April 1989) is a Japanese footballer who plays as a forward for Nankatsu SC.

== Club statistics ==
As of 9 October 2022.

Club performance			League		Cup		League Cup		Total	
Season	Club	League	Apps	Goals	Apps	Goals	Apps	Goals	Apps	Goals
Japan			League		Emperor's Cup		J. League Cup		Total	
2011	Sagan Tosu	J2 League	12	0	0	0	-		12	0
2012	Sagan Tosu	J1 League	19	0	0	0	3	1	22	1
2013	Sagan Tosu	J1 League	12	1	2	2	2	0	16	3
2014	Shonan Bellmare (loan)	J2 League	35	14	2	0	-		37	14
2015	Shonan Bellmare (loan)	J1 League	3	0	0	0	0	0	3	0
2015	Sagan Tosu	J1 League	3	0	1	0	-		4	0
2016	Sagan Tosu	J1 League	13	1	1	1	3	0	17	2
2017	Thespakusatsu Gunma	J2 League	31	4	1	0	-		32	4
2018	Thespakusatsu Gunma	J3 League	13	3	1	1	-		14	4
2019	Thespakusatsu Gunma	J3 League	18	5	1	0	-		19	5
2020	Thespakusatsu Gunma	J2 League	2	0	0	0	-		2	0
2021	Nankatsu SC	Kantō Soccer League Division 2	19	0	0	0	-		19	0
2022	Nankatsu SC	Kantō Soccer League Division 1	6	2	0	0	-		6	2
Total			186	30	9	3	8	1	209	34
