= Naoki Kawaguchi =

Japanese footballer (born 1994)

Naoki Kawaguchi 川口 尚紀
Personal information
- Full name: Naoki Kawaguchi
- Date of birth: 24 May 1994 (age 32)
- Place of birth: Nagaoka, Niigata, Japan
- Height: 1.77 m (5 ft 10 in)
- Position: Right back

Team information
- Current team: FC Ryukyu
- Number: 24

Youth career
- 2001–2006: Kibogaoka SC SSS
- 2007–2009: Nagaoka Billboard FC
- 2010–2012: Albirex Niigata

Senior career*
| Years | Team | Apps | (Gls) |
| 2012–2019 | Albirex Niigata | 101 | (1) |
| 2014–2015 | → J. League U-22 (loan) | 7 | (0) |
| 2016 | → Shimizu S-Pulse (loan) | 19 | (1) |
| 2019 | → Kashiwa Reysol (loan) | 11 | (0) |
| 2020–2025 | Kashiwa Reysol | 72 | (0) |
| 2025 | → Júbilo Iwata (loan) | 23 | (0) |
| 2026 | Júbilo Iwata | 3 | (0) |
| 2026– | FC Ryukyu | 1 | (0) |

International career
| 2011 | Japan U-17 | 4 | (0) |
- * Club domestic league appearances and goals as of 25 August 2026

Naoki Kawaguchi (川口 尚紀, Kawaguchi Naoki; born 24 May 1994) is a Japanese footballer who plays as a right back for FC Ryukyu.

== Club career ==
A product of Albirex Niigata Academy, Kawaguchi joined Albirex at the age of 15 and has been used in both midfield and offensive positions while progressing through the ranks at the club. He made his first team debut in the Emperor's Cup match against Saurcos Fukui in September 2012, and provided the cross for a Bruno Lopes goal. He signed a professional contract in October 2012, following the completion of his scholarship. He made his J. League debut on 27 April 2013, in a 3–2 defeat to Kashima Antlers.

== National team career ==
In June 2011, Kawaguchi was elected to play for Japan's U-17 national team for the 2011 U-17 World Cup, and he played 4 matches as right side-back.

== Club career statistics ==
Last updated: end of 2018 season.

| Club | Season | League | | Emperor's Cup | | J. League Cup | | Total | |
| Club | Season | Apps | Goals | Apps | Goals | Apps | Goals | Apps | Goals |
|---|---|---|---|---|---|---|---|---|---|
| Albirex Niigata | 2012 | 0 | 0 | 2 | 0 | 0 | 0 | 2 | 0 |
| Albirex Niigata | 2013 | 22 | 0 | 2 | 0 | 3 | 0 | 27 | 0 |
| Albirex Niigata | 2014 | 10 | 0 | 0 | 0 | 2 | 0 | 12 | 0 |
| Albirex Niigata | 2015 | 29 | 0 | 1 | 0 | 8 | 1 | 38 | 1 |
| Shimizu S-Pulse | 2016 | 19 | 1 | 1 | 0 | – | | 20 | 1 |
| Albirex Niigata | 2017 | 7 | 0 | 1 | 0 | 3 | 0 | 11 | 0 |
| Albirex Niigata | 2018 | 17 | 0 | 2 | 0 | 5 | 1 | 24 | 1 |
| Total | | 104 | 1 | 9 | 0 | 21 | 2 | 134 | 3 |
