= Yoshiki Takahashi (footballer) =

Japanese footballer

Yoshiki Takahashi 高橋 義希
Personal information
- Full name: Yoshiki Takahashi
- Date of birth: May 14, 1985 (age 41)
- Place of birth: Suzaka, Nagano, Japan
- Height: 1.70 m (5 ft 7 in)
- Position: Midfielder

Youth career
- 2001–2003: Matsusho Gakuen High School

Senior career*
Years	Team	Apps	(Gls)
2004–2009	Sagan Tosu	242	(20)
2010–2011	Vegalta Sendai	32	(0)
2012–2021	Sagan Tosu	236	(6)
- * Club domestic league appearances and goals as of end of 2021 season

Yoshiki Takahashi (高橋 義希, Takahashi Yoshiki; born May 14, 1985) is a Japanese former professional footballer who played as a midfielder. He spent the majority of his career playing for Sagan Tosu, making over 500 appearances for the club between 2004 and 2021.

== Career statistics ==
Appearances and goals by club, season and competition
Club	Season	League			Emperor's Cup		J.League Cup		Total	
Club	Season	Division	Apps	Goals	Apps	Goals	Apps	Goals	Apps	Goals
Sagan Tosu	2004	J2 League	27	1	2	0	—		29	1
Sagan Tosu	2005	J2 League	40	4	2	0	—		42	4
Sagan Tosu	2006	J2 League	47	4	2	1	—		49	5
Sagan Tosu	2007	J2 League	42	2	3	0	—		45	2
Sagan Tosu	2008	J2 League	40	3	4	1	—		44	4
Sagan Tosu	2009	J2 League	46	6	1	0	—		47	6
Vegalta Sendai	2010	J1 League	13	0	1	0	7	1	21	1
Vegalta Sendai	2011	J1 League	19	0	2	0	3	0	24	0
Sagan Tosu	2012	J1 League	16	0	1	0	1	0	18	0
Sagan Tosu	2013	J1 League	34	2	5	1	2	0	41	3
Sagan Tosu	2014	J1 League	30	1	3	1	4	0	37	2
Sagan Tosu	2015	J1 League	32	0	3	0	4	0	39	0
Sagan Tosu	2016	J1 League	34	1	3	0	3	0	40	1
Sagan Tosu	2017	J1 League	34	1	2	0	4	2	40	3
Sagan Tosu	2018	J1 League	30	1	4	0	4	0	38	1
Sagan Tosu	2019	J1 League	19	0	3	0	4	0	26	0
Sagan Tosu	2020	J1 League	4	0	0	0	1	0	5	0
Sagan Tosu	2021	J1 League	3	0	1	0	5	0	9	0
Career total			510	26	42	4	42	3	594	33
