= 2014 Sagan Tosu season =

Sagan Tosu
2014 season
- Manager: Yoon Jong-hwan; Megumu Yoshida
- Stadium: Best Amenity Stadium
- J1 League: 5th

2014 Sagan Tosu season.

== League table ==
Pos	Team	Pld	W	D	L	GF	GA	GD	Pts	Qualification or relegation
3	Kashima Antlers	34	18	6	10	64	39	+25	60	Qualification for 2015 AFC Champions League group stage (Note: Because Gamba Osaka also won the 2014 Emperor's Cup, the group stage spot has been given to third-placed Kashima Antlers, while ACL qualification spot was awarded to the fourth-placed Kashiwa Reysol.)
4	Kashiwa Reysol	34	17	9	8	48	40	+8	60	Qualification for 2015 AFC Champions League Third qualifying round
5	Sagan Tosu	34	19	3	12	41	33	+8	60	
6	Kawasaki Frontale	34	16	7	11	56	43	+13	55	
7	Yokohama F. Marinos	34	14	9	11	37	29	+8	51	

Updated to match(es) played on 8 December 2014. Source: J.League Data
Rules for classification: 1) points; 2) goal difference; 3) number of goals scored.

== J1 League ==
Match	Date	Team	Score	Team	Venue	Attendance
1	2014.03.01	Sagan Tosu	5-0	Tokushima Vortis	Best Amenity Stadium	14,296
2	2014.03.08	Urawa Reds	0-1	Sagan Tosu	Saitama Stadium 2002	42,850
3	2014.03.15	Sagan Tosu	0-3	Kashima Antlers	Best Amenity Stadium	13,013
4	2014.03.23	Albirex Niigata	1-0	Sagan Tosu	Denka Big Swan Stadium	21,278
5	2014.03.29	Sagan Tosu	2-0	Gamba Osaka	Best Amenity Stadium	12,115
6	2014.04.06	FC Tokyo	2-1	Sagan Tosu	Ajinomoto Stadium	14,165
7	2014.04.12	Sagan Tosu	2-0	Ventforet Kofu	Best Amenity Stadium	8,276
8	2014.04.19	Vegalta Sendai	0-3	Sagan Tosu	Yurtec Stadium Sendai	11,413
9	2014.04.26	Nagoya Grampus	2-3	Sagan Tosu	Nagoya Mizuho Athletic Stadium	9,065
10	2014.04.29	Sagan Tosu	1-2	Sanfrecce Hiroshima	Best Amenity Stadium	17,339
11	2014.05.03	Shimizu S-Pulse	0-1	Sagan Tosu	IAI Stadium Nihondaira	17,286
12	2014.05.06	Sagan Tosu	1-0	Kashiwa Reysol	Best Amenity Stadium	14,457
13	2014.05.10	Yokohama F. Marinos	1-2	Sagan Tosu	Nissan Stadium	19,606
14	2014.05.17	Sagan Tosu	1-1	Omiya Ardija	Best Amenity Stadium	11,339
15	2014.07.19	Vissel Kobe	0-1	Sagan Tosu	Noevir Stadium Kobe	20,616
16	2014.07.23	Sagan Tosu	0-1	Kawasaki Frontale	Best Amenity Stadium	23,277
17	2014.07.27	Cerezo Osaka	0-1	Sagan Tosu	Kincho Stadium	13,431
18	2014.08.02	Sagan Tosu	1-0	Nagoya Grampus	Best Amenity Stadium	10,415
19	2014.08.11	Sanfrecce Hiroshima	1-0	Sagan Tosu	Edion Stadium Hiroshima	12,026
20	2014.08.16	Sagan Tosu	0-2	FC Tokyo	Best Amenity Stadium	18,100
21	2014.08.23	Omiya Ardija	1-3	Sagan Tosu	NACK5 Stadium Omiya	8,718
22	2014.08.30	Sagan Tosu	2-2	Shimizu S-Pulse	Best Amenity Stadium	17,234
23	2014.09.13	Ventforet Kofu	1-0	Sagan Tosu	Yamanashi Chuo Bank Stadium	10,352
24	2014.09.20	Sagan Tosu	2-1	Vegalta Sendai	Best Amenity Stadium	10,231
25	2014.09.23	Kashiwa Reysol	2-0	Sagan Tosu	Hitachi Kashiwa Stadium	9,022
26	2014.09.27	Gamba Osaka	4-1	Sagan Tosu	Expo '70 Commemorative Stadium	13,221
27	2014.10.05	Sagan Tosu	1-0	Yokohama F. Marinos	Best Amenity Stadium	12,632
28	2014.10.18	Sagan Tosu	1-0	Cerezo Osaka	Best Amenity Stadium	15,083
29	2014.10.22	Kawasaki Frontale	2-0	Sagan Tosu	Kawasaki Todoroki Stadium	10,609
30	2014.10.26	Sagan Tosu	0-2	Albirex Niigata	Best Amenity Stadium	10,386
31	2014.11.02	Sagan Tosu	2-1	Vissel Kobe	Best Amenity Stadium	12,895
32	2014.11.22	Tokushima Vortis	0-1	Sagan Tosu	Pocarisweat Stadium	6,259
33	2014.11.29	Sagan Tosu	1-1	Urawa Reds	Best Amenity Stadium	19,235
34	2014.12.06	Kashima Antlers	0-1	Sagan Tosu	Kashima Soccer Stadium	25,318
