= Shuto Hira =

Japanese footballer

Shūto Hira 平 秀斗
Personal information
- Full name: Shūto Hira
- Date of birth: 25 June 1994 (age 32)
- Place of birth: Kagoshima, Japan
- Height: 1.70 m (5 ft 7 in)
- Position: Forward

Youth career
- 2010–2012: Sagahigashi Senior High School

Senior career*
| Years | Team | Apps | (Gls) |
| 2013–2016 | Sagan Tosu | 0 | (0) |
| 2014 | → J.League U-22 (loan) | 14 | (2) |
| 2016 | → Thespakusatsu Gunma (loan) | 10 | (0) |
| 2017–2018 | Fukushima United FC | 26 | (3) |
- * Club domestic league appearances and goals as of 23 February 2019

Shūto Hira (平 秀斗, Hira Shūto; born 25 June 1994) is a former Japanese professional footballer who last played forward for Fukushima United FC.

== Career ==
Born in Kagoshima Prefecture, Hira made his debut for Sagan Tosu of the J1 League on 3 April 2013 against Kashima Antlers in the J.League Cup in which he entered in the 80th minute for Ryota Hayasaka and earned a yellow card three minutes afterward as Sagan Tosu lost the match 1–0.

== Club statistics ==
Updated to 23 February 2019.

| Club | Season | League | | Emperor's Cup | | J. League Cup | | Total | |
| Club | Season | Apps | Goals | Apps | Goals | Apps | Goals | Apps | Goals |
|---|---|---|---|---|---|---|---|---|---|
| Sagan Tosu | 2013 | 0 | 0 | 0 | 0 | 0 | 0 | 0 | 0 |
| Sagan Tosu | 2014 | 0 | 0 | 0 | 0 | 2 | 0 | 2 | 0 |
| Sagan Tosu | 2015 | 0 | 0 | 0 | 0 | 1 | 0 | 1 | 0 |
| Sagan Tosu | 2016 | 0 | 0 | 0 | 0 | 0 | 0 | 0 | 0 |
| Thespakusatsu Gunma | 2016 | 10 | 0 | 0 | 0 | – | | 10 | 0 |
| Fukushima United FC | 2017 | 15 | 3 | – | | – | | 15 | 3 |
| Fukushima United FC | 2018 | 11 | 0 | – | | – | | 11 | 0 |
| Career total | | 36 | 3 | 0 | 0 | 3 | 0 | 41 | 3 |
