= Takashi Kanai =

Japanese footballer (born 1990)

Personal information
- Date of birth: 5 February 1990 (age 36)
- Place of birth: Yokohama, Japan
- Height: 1.74 m (5 ft 9 in)
- Position: Full-back

Youth career
- 2002–2007: Yokohama F. Marinos

Senior career*
| Years | Team | Apps | (Gls) |
| 2008–2012 | Yokohama F. Marinos | 54 | (1) |
| 2013 | → Sagan Tosu (loan) | 15 | (2) |
| 2014 | Sagan Tosu | 7 | (0) |
| 2015 | JEF United Chiba | 35 | (5) |
| 2016–2018 | Yokohama F. Marinos | 44 | (4) |
| 2018–2019 | Nagoya Grampus | 18 | (4) |
| 2019 | → Sagan Tosu (loan) | 10 | (3) |
| 2020 | Shimizu S-Pulse | 14 | (2) |
| 2021 | Ventforet Kofu | 7 | (0) |
| 2021–2022 | FC Ryukyu | 44 | (4) |
| 2023 | Kamatamare Sanuki | 16 | (0) |
| Total | | 269 | (26) |

International career
| 2007 | Japan U-17 | 3 | (0) |
Medal record
Yokohama F. Marinos
| Runner-up | J.League Cup | 2018 |
| Runner-up | Emperor's Cup | 2017 |
Representing Japan
AFC U-16 Championship
| Gold medal – first place | 2006 Singapore |
- * Club domestic league appearances and goals as of 13:13 @ 10 January 2024(AEST)

Takashi Kanai (金井 貢史, Kanai Takashi; born 5 February 1990) is a Japanese former professional football player who played as a full-back.

A journeyman defender, Kanai made over 160 appearances in the J1 League.

== Career ==
On 11 January 2014, Kanai was announced at Sagan Tosu on a permanent transfer.

On 13 January 2015, Kanai was announced at JEF United Chiba on a permanent transfer. He moved to Yokohama F. Marinos in the next year.

On 10 March 2017, Kanai made his 100th J1 League appearance against Kashima Antlers. During the 2017 season, he scored the winning goal in two league matches.

On 25 July 2018, Kanai was announced at Nagoya Grampus on a permanent transfer. He scored his first two goals for the club against Kashima Antlers on 11 August. He was described as a player to "watch out" for.

On 15 August 2019, Kanai was announced at Sagan Tosu on a six month loan deal. He moved on to Shimizu S-Pulse the following year.

On 6 January 2021, Kanai was announced at Ventforet Kofu on a permanent transfer. Already on 28 July 2021, Kanai was announced at FC Ryukyu on a permanent transfer. On 27 October 2022, the club announced he would not be renewing his contract for the 2023 season.

On 22 December 2022, Kanai was announced at Kamatamare Sanuki on a permanent transfer. On 1 December 2023, Kanai announced he would retire at the end of the 2023 season.

== International career ==
In August 2007, Kanai was selected for the Japan U-17 national team for the 2007 U-17 World Cup.

Kanai was called up to the Japan squad for the 2010 Asian Games. He was going to withdraw from the squad after discovering he had arrhythmia, but was forced to withdraw after it was discovered he was driving without a license.

== Personal life ==
In October 2010, Kanai was found to have been driving without a license. He obtained his driver's license in August 2008, but was involved in an accident that could have resulted in injury or death in April 2009. He reported the accident to Yokohama F. Marinos as a "minor rear-end collison", and his license was suspended. He did not take the required training course to get his license back, and was suspended by the club from all remaining training sessions and games until the end of the season.

== Club statistics ==
Updated to 21 February 2019.

| Club | Season | League | | Cup^{1} | | League Cup^{2} | | Total | |
| Club | Season | Apps | Goals | Apps | Goals | Apps | Goals | Apps | Goals |
|---|---|---|---|---|---|---|---|---|---|
| Yokohama F. Marinos | 2008 | 5 | 0 | 0 | 0 | 1 | 0 | 6 | 0 |
| Yokohama F. Marinos | 2009 | 9 | 0 | 0 | 0 | 0 | 0 | 9 | 0 |
| Yokohama F. Marinos | 2010 | 8 | 0 | 2 | 0 | 5 | 1 | 15 | 1 |
| Yokohama F. Marinos | 2011 | 21 | 0 | 4 | 0 | 3 | 0 | 28 | 0 |
| Yokohama F. Marinos | 2012 | 16 | 1 | 2 | 0 | 3 | 1 | 21 | 2 |
| Total | | 59 | 1 | 8 | 0 | 12 | 2 | 79 | 3 |
| Sagan Tosu | 2013 | 15 | 2 | 5 | 2 | 5 | 1 | 25 | 5 |
| Sagan Tosu | 2014 | 7 | 0 | 2 | 1 | 4 | 0 | 13 | 1 |
| Total | | 22 | 2 | 7 | 3 | 9 | 1 | 38 | 6 |
| JEF United Chiba | 2015 | 35 | 5 | 2 | 0 | – | | 37 | 5 |
| Total | | 35 | 5 | 2 | 0 | – | | 37 | 5 |
| Yokohama F. Marinos | 2016 | 17 | 0 | 5 | 0 | 7 | 1 | 29 | 1 |
| Yokohama F. Marinos | 2017 | 21 | 2 | 1 | 0 | 0 | 0 | 22 | 2 |
| Yokohama F. Marinos | 2018 | 6 | 2 | 2 | 0 | 8 | 0 | 16 | 2 |
| Total | | 44 | 4 | 8 | 0 | 15 | 1 | 67 | 5 |
| Nagoya Grampus | 2018 | 15 | 4 | 0 | 0 | 0 | 0 | 15 | 4 |
| Career Total | | 175 | 16 | 25 | 3 | 36 | 4 | 236 | 23 |

^{1}Includes Emperor's Cup.

^{2}Includes J. League Cup.

== Awards and honours ==
=== Japan ===
- AFC U-17 Championship (1) : 2006
