= Ryuhei Niwa =

Japanese footballer

Ryuhei Niwa 丹羽 竜平
Personal information
- Full name: Ryuhei Niwa
- Date of birth: January 13, 1986 (age 40)
- Place of birth: Yokohama, Japan
- Height: 1.76 m (5 ft 9 1/2 in)
- Position: Defender

Team information
- Current team: SC Sagamihara
- Number: 15

Youth career
- 1995–2003: Yokohama F. Marinos

Senior career*
Years	Team	Apps	(Gls)
2004–2009	Vissel Kobe	62	(1)
2007–2008	→ Cerezo Osaka (loan)	39	(0)
2010–2016	Sagan Tosu	179	(4)
2016	JEF United Chiba	18	(1)
2017	Kagoshima United FC	27	(0)
2018–	SC Sagamihara	31	(0)
- * Club domestic league appearances and goals as of end of 2018 season

Ryuhei Niwa (丹羽 竜平, Niwa Ryūhei; born January 13, 1986) is a Japanese football player who plays for SC Sagamihara.

== Career statistics ==
Updated to 26 December 2017.

Appearances and goals by club, season and competition
Club	Season	League			Emperor's Cup		J.League Cup		Total	
Club	Season	Division	Apps	Goals	Apps	Goals	Apps	Goals	Apps	Goals
Vissel Kobe	2004	J1 League	8	0	1	0	2	0	11	0
Vissel Kobe	2005	J1 League	11	0	0	0	1	0	12	0
Vissel Kobe	2006	J2 League	40	1	1	0	—		41	1
Cerezo Osaka	2007	J2 League	23	0	0	0	—		23	0
Cerezo Osaka	2008	J2 League	16	0	0	0	—		16	0
Vissel Kobe	2009	J1 League	3	0	0	0	4	0	7	0
Sagan Tosu	2010	J2 League	33	0	1	0	—		34	0
Sagan Tosu	2011	J2 League	28	2	0	0	—		28	2
Sagan Tosu	2012	J1 League	33	0	1	0	1	0	35	0
Sagan Tosu	2013	J1 League	33	1	3	1	1	0	37	2
Sagan Tosu	2014	J1 League	33	1	2	0	3	0	38	1
Sagan Tosu	2015	J1 League	19	0	4	0	2	0	25	0
Sagan Tosu	2016	J1 League	0	0	0	0	2	0	2	0
JEF United Chiba	2016	J2 League	18	1	2	1	—		20	2
Kagoshima United FC	2017	J3 League	27	0	2	0	—		29	0
Career total			325	6	17	2	16	0	358	8
