= Hidetaka Kanazono =

Japanese footballer

Hidetaka Kanazono 金園 英学
Personal information
- Full name: Hidetaka Kanazono
- Date of birth: 1 September 1988 (age 38)
- Place of birth: Osaka, Japan
- Height: 1.84 m (6 ft 0 in)
- Position: Striker

Team information
- Current team: AC Nagano Parceiro
- Number: 17

Youth career
- 2007–2010: Kansai University

Senior career*
Years	Team	Apps	(Gls)
2011–2014	Júbilo Iwata	73	(20)
2015–2016	Vegalta Sendai	36	(7)
2017–2018	Hokkaido Consadole Sapporo	15	(0)
2018	→ Ventforet Kofu (loan)	20	(6)
2019–2020	Ventforet Kofu	0	(0)
2021–	AC Nagano Parceiro	0	(0)
- * Club domestic league appearances and goals as of 17:54, 29 April 2021 (UTC)

Hidetaka Kanazono (金園 英学, Kanazono Hidetaka; born 1 September 1988) is a Japanese association footballer who is currently contracted to AC Nagano Parceiro. He plays as a striker.

== Career ==
Kanazono played a significant amount of junior football before breaking through to the first XI of the Júbilo Iwata side in 2011. He made his debut in the Opening Round 2011 J. League Division 1 match against Ventforet Kofu as late substitute in the 1–0 victory.

== Career statistics ==
=== Club ===
Updated to 23 February 2018.

Club	Season	League		Cup^{1}		League Cup^{2}		Other^{3}		Total	
Club	Season	Apps	Goals	Apps	Goals	Apps	Goals	Apps	Goals	Apps	Goals
Júbilo Iwata	2011	28	12	2	0	3	0	1	0	34	12
Júbilo Iwata	2012	5	1	1	0	0	0	-		6	1
Júbilo Iwata	2013	30	6	0	0	6	3	-		36	9
Júbilo Iwata	2014	10	1	1	2	-		-		11	3
Vegalta Sendai	2015	29	7	3	0	3	1	-		35	8
Vegalta Sendai	2016	7	0	0	0	1	0	-		8	0
Hokkaido Consadole Sapporo	2017	15	0	1	0	4	0	-		20	0
Ventforet Kofu	2018										
Ventforet Kofu	2019										
Ventforet Kofu	2020										
AC Nagano Parceiro	2021										
Total		124	27	8	2	17	4	1	0	140	33

^{1}Includes Emperor's Cup.

^{2}Includes J. League Cup.

^{3}Includes Suruga Bank Championship.

== Awards and honours ==
=== Club ===
Júbilo Iwata

- Suruga Bank Championship (1): 2011
