= Koki Kiyotake =

Japanese footballer (born 1991)

Koki Kiyotake 清武 功暉
Personal information
- Full name: Koki Kiyotake
- Date of birth: March 20, 1991 (age 35)
- Place of birth: Ōita, Japan
- Height: 1.77 m (5 ft 9 1/2 in)
- Position: Midfielder

Team information
- Current team: Ococias Kyoto AC
- Number: 8

Youth career
- 2006–2008: Oita Trinita U-18
- 2008–2012: Fukuoka University

Senior career*
Years	Team	Apps	(Gls)
2012–2016	Sagan Tosu	14	(0)
2015–2016	→ Roasso Kumamoto (loan)	56	(19)
2017–2018	JEF United Chiba	56	(14)
2019–2020	Tokushima Vortis	48	(9)
2021–2023	FC Ryukyu	83	(13)
2024–	Ococias Kyoto AC		
- * Club domestic league appearances and goals as of 17:30, 31 January 2024

Koki Kiyotake (清武 功暉, Kiyotake Koki; born March 20, 1991) is a Japanese football player for Ococias Kyoto AC.

== Career ==
Kiyotake made his league debut for Sagan against Albirex Niigata on 21 April 2012. He scored his first goal for the club against Vegalta Sendai, scoring in the 57th minute.

Kiyotake made his league debut for Roasso against Thespa Gunma on 8 July 2015. He scored his first league goal for the club against Gifu on 8 August 2015, scoring in the 58th minute.

Kiyotake made his league debut for JEF United against Machida Zelvia on 26 February 2017. He scored his first league goal for the club against Matsumoto Yamaga on 19 March 2017, scoring in the 72nd minute.

Kiyotake scored on his league debut for Tokushima against Kagoshima United on 24 February 2019, scoring in the 85th minute.

On 4 February 2021, Kiyotake was announced at FC Ryukyu. He made his league debut for Ryukyu against Júbilo Iwata on 28 February 2021. Kioytake scored his first league goal for the club against Mito HollyHock on 11 April 2021, scoring in the 62nd minute.

On 7 January 2024, Kiyotake was announced at Ococias Kyoto.

== Personal life ==
His older brother, Hiroshi, is also a football player.

== Club statistics ==
Updated to end of 2018 season.

Appearances and goals by club, season and competition
Club	Season	League			Emperor's Cup		J. League Cup		Total	
Club	Season	Division	Apps	Goals	Apps	Goals	Apps	Goals	Apps	Goals
Sagan Tosu	2012	J1 League	2	0	–		1	0	3	0
Sagan Tosu	2013	J1 League	10	0	0	0	4	0	14	0
Sagan Tosu	2014	J1 League	2	0	0	0	3	1	5	1
Sagan Tosu	2015	J1 League	0	0	–		2	0	2	0
Roasso Kumamoto	2015	J2 League	19	7	3	0	–		22	7
Roasso Kumamoto	2016	J2 League	37	12	2	0	–		39	12
JEF United Chiba	2017	J2 League	40	11	2	1	–		42	12
JEF United Chiba	2018	J2 League	16	3	2	1	–		18	4
Total			126	33	9	2	10	1	145	36

== Honours ==
Tokushima Vortis

- J2 League: 2020
