= Shohei Kishida =

Japanese footballer

Shohei Kishida 岸田 翔平
Personal information
- Full name: Shōhei Kishida
- Date of birth: April 3, 1990 (age 36)
- Place of birth: Hiji, Ōita, Japan
- Height: 1.80 m (5 ft 11 in)
- Position: Defender

Team information
- Current team: J-Lease FC
- Number: 5

Youth career
- Toyooka FC
- –2008: Oita Trinita

College career
| Years | Team | Apps | (Gls) |
| 2009–2012 | Fukuoka University | | |

Senior career*
| Years | Team | Apps | (Gls) |
| 2012–2016 | Sagan Tosu | 4 | (0) |
| 2015–2016 | → V-Varen Nagasaki (loan) | 58 | (4) |
| 2017–2018 | Oita Trinita | 33 | (1) |
| 2019–2023 | Mito HollyHock | 56 | (0) |
| 2023–2024 | ReinMeer Aomori | 66 | (3) |
| 2025– | J-Lease FC | 10 | (2) |
- * Club domestic league appearances and goals as of 11:43, 15 October 2026 (UTC)

Shohei Kishida (岸田 翔平, Kishida Shōhei; born April 3, 1990) is a Japanese football player who plays as a defender for J-Lease FC.

== Club statistics ==
As of 15 October 2026.

Appearances and goals by club, season and competition
| Club | Season | League | | | National cup (Note: Includes Emperor's Cup) | | League cup (Note: Includes J.League Cup) | | Other | | Total | |
| Club | Season | Division | Apps | Goals | Apps | Goals | Apps | Goals | Apps | Goals | Apps | Goals |
|---|---|---|---|---|---|---|---|---|---|---|---|---|
| Fukuoka University | 2009 | – | | | 0 | 0 | – | | – | | 0 | 0 |
| Fukuoka University | 2011 | – | | | 3 | 0 | – | | – | | 3 | 0 |
| Fukuoka University | 2012 | – | | | 2 | 1 | – | | – | | 2 | 1 |
| Fukuoka University | Total | | 0 | 0 | 5 | 1 | 0 | 0 | 0 | 0 | 5 | 1 |
| Sagan Tosu | 2012 | J.League Division 1 | 1 | 0 | 0 | 0 | 0 | 0 | – | | 1 | 0 |
| Sagan Tosu | 2013 | J.League Division 1 | 3 | 0 | 0 | 0 | 2 | 0 | – | | 5 | 0 |
| Sagan Tosu | 2014 | J.League Division 1 | 0 | 0 | 0 | 0 | 2 | 0 | – | | 2 | 0 |
| Sagan Tosu | Total | | 4 | 0 | 0 | 0 | 4 | 0 | 0 | 0 | 8 | 0 |
| V-Varen Nagasaki (loan) | 2015 | J2 League | 24 | 0 | 2 | 0 | – | | 0 | 0 | 26 | 0 |
| V-Varen Nagasaki (loan) | 2016 | J2 League | 34 | 4 | 2 | 0 | – | | 0 | 0 | 36 | 4 |
| V-Varen Nagasaki (loan) | Total | | 58 | 4 | 4 | 0 | 0 | 0 | 0 | 0 | 62 | 4 |
| Oita Trinita | 2017 | J2 League | 29 | 1 | 1 | 0 | – | | – | | 30 | 1 |
| Oita Trinita | 2018 | J2 League | 4 | 0 | 1 | 0 | – | | – | | 5 | 0 |
| Oita Trinita | Total | | 33 | 1 | 2 | 0 | 0 | 0 | 0 | 0 | 35 | 1 |
| Mito HollyHock | 2019 | J2 League | 30 | 0 | 1 | 0 | – | | – | | 31 | 0 |
| Mito HollyHock | 2020 | J2 League | 23 | 0 | 0 | 0 | – | | – | | 23 | 0 |
| Mito HollyHock | 2021 | J2 League | 3 | 0 | 1 | 0 | – | | – | | 4 | 0 |
| Mito HollyHock | Total | | 56 | 0 | 2 | 0 | 0 | 0 | 0 | 0 | 58 | 0 |
| ReinMeer Aomori | 2022 | JFL | 28 | 2 | – | | – | | – | | 28 | 2 |
| ReinMeer Aomori | 2023 | JFL | 26 | 1 | – | | – | | – | | 26 | 1 |
| ReinMeer Aomori | 2024 | JFL | 12 | 0 | – | | – | | – | | 12 | 0 |
| ReinMeer Aomori | Total | | 66 | 3 | 0 | 0 | 0 | 0 | 0 | 0 | 66 | 3 |
| J-Lease FC | 2025 | Kyushu Soccer League | 7 | 2 | – | | – | | 8 (Note: Appearance in Japanese Regional Football Champions League) | 0 | 15 | 2 |
| J-Lease FC | 2026 | JFL Cup | 3 | 0 | – | | – | | 0 | 0 | 3 | 0 |
| J-Lease FC | 2026–27 | JFL | 0 | 0 | – | | – | | 0 | 0 | 0 | 0 |
| J-Lease FC | Total | | 10 | 2 | 0 | 0 | 0 | 0 | 8 | 0 | 18 | 2 |
| Career total | | | 227 | 10 | 13 | 1 | 4 | 0 | 8 | 0 | 252 | 11 |
