= Tatsuya Sakai =

Japanese footballer

Tatsuya Sakai 坂井 達弥
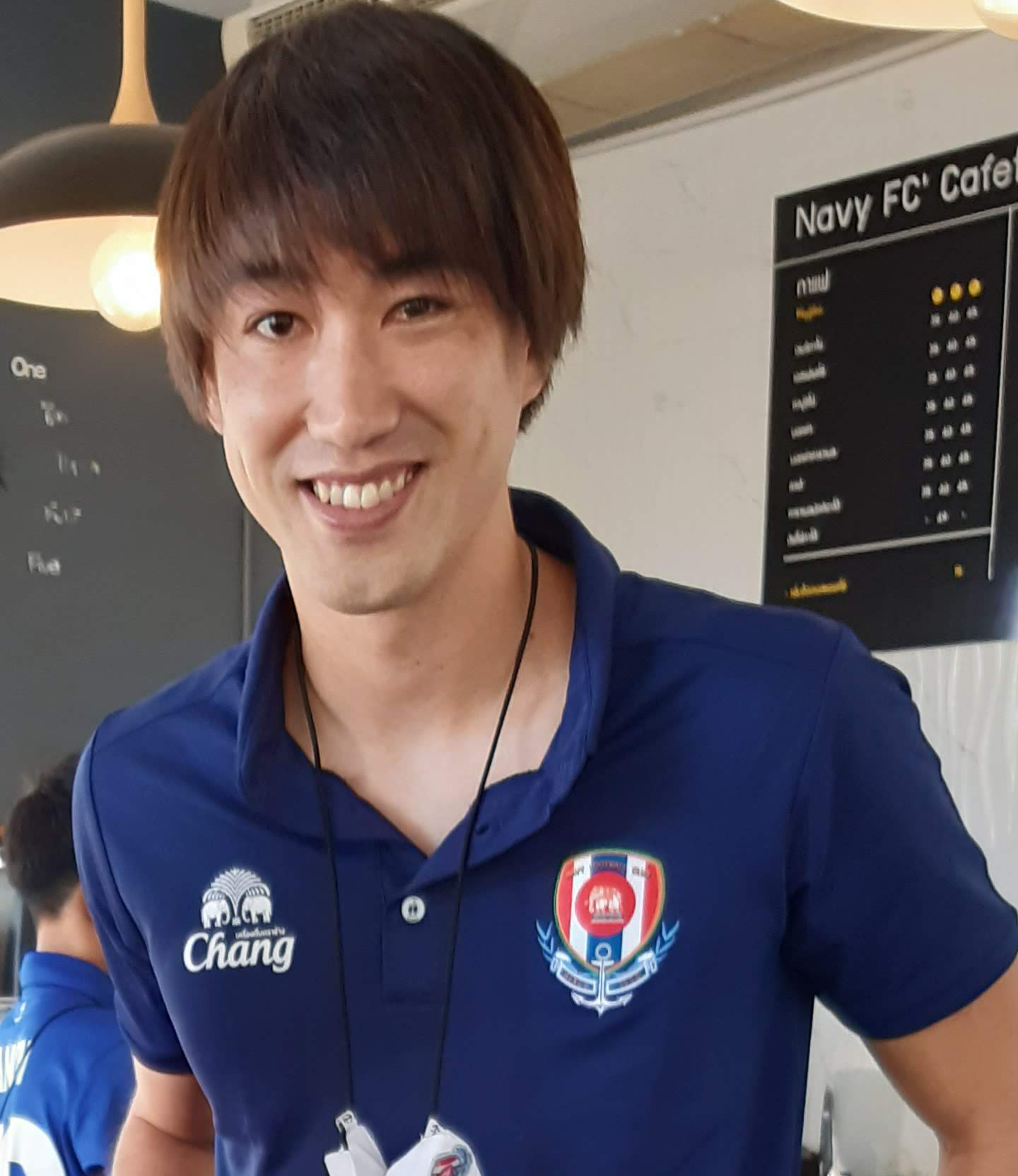

Personal information
- Full name: Tatsuya Sakai
- Date of birth: 19 November 1990 (age 35)
- Place of birth: Fukuoka, Japan
- Height: 1.83 m (6 ft 0 in)
- Position: Centre back

Youth career
- 2006–2008: Higashi Fukuoka High School

College career
Years	Team	Apps	(Gls)
2009–2012	NIFS Kanoya		

Senior career*
Years	Team	Apps	(Gls)
2012–2017	Sagan Tosu	25	(0)
2015	→ Matsumoto Yamaga (loan)	3	(0)
2016	→ V-Varen Nagasaki (loan)	12	(0)
2017	→ Oita Trinita (loan)	4	(0)
2018–2020	Montedio Yamagata	7	(0)
2020–2021	Samut Prakan City	6	(0)
2020–2021	→ Navy (loan)	16	(2)
2021–2022	Navy	22	(0)

International career
2014	Japan	1	(0)
- * Club domestic league appearances and goals as of 16 April 2022

Tatsuya Sakai (坂井 達弥, Sakai Tatsuya; born 19 November 1990) is a Japanese football player.

== Club statistics ==
Updated to end of 2018 season.

Club performance			League		Cup		League Cup		Total	
Season	Club	League	Apps	Goals	Apps	Goals	Apps	Goals	Apps	Goals
Japan			League		Emperor's Cup		J. League Cup		Total	
2009	Kanoya Taiiku Daigaku	-	-		3	0	-		3	0
2010	Kanoya Taiiku Daigaku	-	-		2	0	-		2	0
2012	Sagan Tosu	J1 League	2	0	-		4	0	6	0
2013	Sagan Tosu	J1 League	14	0	3	0	4	0	21	0
2014	Sagan Tosu	J1 League	9	0	1	0	3	0	13	0
2015	Matsumoto Yamaga	J1 League	3	0	0	0	4	2	7	2
2015	Sagan Tosu	J1 League	0	0	0	0	0	0	0	0
2016	Sagan Tosu	J1 League	0	0	–		1	0	1	0
2016	V-Varen Nagasaki	J2 League	12	0	2	0	–		14	0
2017	Oita Trinita	J2 League	4	0	2	0	–		6	0
2018	Montedio Yamagata	J2 League	5	0	3	2	–		8	2
Total			49	0	16	2	16	2	81	4

== National team statistics ==
Japan national team
Year	Apps	Goals
2014	1	0
Total	1	0
