= Ryota Hayasaka =

Japanese footballer

Ryota Hayasaka 早坂 良太
Personal information
- Full name: Ryota Hayasaka
- Date of birth: September 19, 1985 (age 41)
- Place of birth: Nara, Japan
- Height: 1.83 m (6 ft 0 in)
- Position: Right back

Youth career
- 2004–2007: Shizuoka University

Senior career*
| Years | Team | Apps | (Gls) |
| 2008–2009 | Honda FC | 58 | (16) |
| 2010–2016 | Sagan Tosu | 199 | (20) |
| 2017–2020 | Hokkaido Consadole Sapporo | 72 | (2) |
| Total | | 329 | (38) |
- * Club domestic league appearances and goals as of 22:48, 22 March 2023 (UTC)

Ryota Hayasaka (早坂 良太, Hayasaka Ryōta; born September 19, 1985) is a Japanese former professional footballer who played as a right back.

== Career ==
Starting out at Honda FC in the Japan Football League, he spent much of his career playing in the top division of Japanese football playing over 200 times for Sagan Tosu before spending four years at Hokkaido Consadole Sapporo. He announced his retirement in December 2020.

== Career statistics ==
Appearances and goals by club, season and competition
| Club | Season | League | | | Emperor's Cup | | J.League Cup | | Total | |
| Club | Season | Division | Apps | Goals | Apps | Goals | Apps | Goals | Apps | Goals |
|---|---|---|---|---|---|---|---|---|---|---|
| Honda FC | 2008 | JFL | 27 | 7 | 3 | 4 | – | | 30 | 11 |
| Honda FC | 2009 | JFL | 31 | 9 | 2 | 1 | – | | 33 | 10 |
| Sagan Tosu | 2010 | J2 League | 36 | 4 | 2 | 1 | – | | 38 | 5 |
| Sagan Tosu | 2011 | J2 League | 37 | 10 | 0 | 0 | – | | 37 | 10 |
| Sagan Tosu | 2012 | J1 League | 21 | 0 | 1 | 0 | 3 | 1 | 25 | 1 |
| Sagan Tosu | 2013 | J1 League | 26 | 3 | 4 | 0 | 6 | 1 | 36 | 4 |
| Sagan Tosu | 2014 | J1 League | 28 | 3 | 3 | 0 | 5 | 1 | 36 | 4 |
| Sagan Tosu | 2015 | J1 League | 23 | 0 | 4 | 1 | 6 | 0 | 33 | 1 |
| Sagan Tosu | 2016 | J1 League | 28 | 0 | 3 | 0 | 3 | 0 | 34 | 0 |
| Hokkaido Consadole Sapporo | 2017 | J1 League | 24 | 1 | 0 | 0 | 5 | 0 | 29 | 1 |
| Hokkaido Consadole Sapporo | 2018 | J1 League | 23 | 0 | 3 | 1 | 6 | 0 | 32 | 1 |
| Hokkaido Consadole Sapporo | 2019 | J1 League | 13 | 1 | 0 | 0 | 9 | 1 | 22 | 2 |
| Hokkaido Consadole Sapporo | 2020 | J1 League | 12 | 0 | 0 | 0 | 2 | 0 | 14 | 0 |
| Career total | | | 329 | 38 | 25 | 8 | 45 | 4 | 399 | 50 |
