= Keiko (given name) =

- Gender: Female

Origin
- Origin: Japanese
- Meaning: Depends on the kanji used
- Region of origin: Japan

Other names
- Related names: Kei, Keiki

Keiko is a feminine Japanese given name. Keikō (景行), with a long "o", is the name posthumously given to Emperor Keikō.

== Possible meanings ==
As with many Japanese names, Keiko can be written using a number of different kanji. Some of the most common ways of writing Keiko (and the most representative meanings of the respective kanji) are:

- 恵子 — "lucky child"
- 敬子 — "respectful child"
- 景子 — "sunlight/view/scenic child"
- 桂子 — "katsura tree child"
- 圭子 — "blessed child"
- 慶子 — "happy child"
- 啓子 — "open (one's eyes)/express/spring (season) child"
- 硅子 — "silicon child"

The suffix ko (子) implies the name is female and the name is almost never given to males. Much less commonly, Keiko can also be written as 螢子, 輕子, or 軽子.

== People with the name ==
- Keiko Abe (安倍 圭子; born 1937), Japanese composer and marimba player
- Keiko Agena (born 1973), American actress
- Keiko Ai (阿井 景子; born 1932), Japanese writer
- Keiko Aizawa (相沢 恵子; born 1963), Japanese actress who specializes in voice acting
- Keiko Aoki (青木 恵子; born 1968), Japanese retired professional wrestler and professional golfer
- Keiko Aono (青野 敬子; born 1973), Japanese retired professional wrestler
- Keiko Awaji (淡路 恵子; 1933–2014), Japanese stage and film actress
- Keiko Bonk (born 1954), American artist, musician and former politician
- Keiko Chiba (千葉 景子; born 1948), Japanese politician and former justice minister
- Keiko Devaux (born 1982), Canadian composer
- Keiko Erikawa (襟川 恵子; born 1949), Japanese businesswoman and video game designer
- Keiko Fuji (藤 圭子; 1951-2013), Japanese enka singer, actress, and mother of Hikaru Utada
- Keiko Fujiie (藤家 渓子; born 1963), Japanese composer
- Keiko Fujimori (藤森 恵子; born 1975), Peruvian politician and business administrator
- Keiko Fukazawa (born 1955), Japanese ceramicist
- Keiko Fukuda (福田 敬子; 1913-2013), Japanese-American martial artist and judoka
- Keiko Furukawa (古川 圭子; born 1967), Japanese announcer
- Keiko Hama (浜 恵子; born 1947), Japanese former volleyball player
- Keiko Han (潘 恵子; born 1953), Japanese actress and voice actress
- Keiko Hanagata (花形 恵子; 1935-2015), Japanese voice actress
- Keiko Hasegawa (長谷川 恵子; born 1955), Japanese speed skater
- Keiko Hattori, Japanese geochemist and mineralogist
- Keiko Higuchi (樋口 恵子; born 1932), Japanese activist, journalist and writer
- Keiko Hirakawa (平川 啓子; born 1955), Japanese sport shooter
- Keiko Holmes (恵子・ホームズ; born 1948), Japanese coordinator for a charity
- Keiko Ihara (井原 慶子; born 1973), Japanese race car driver
- Keiko Ishida (born 1973), Japanese former professional tennis player
- Keiko Itō (伊藤 敬子; 1935–2020), Japanese poet
- Keiko Itoh (伊藤 恵子; born 1950), Japanese writer and historian
- Keiko Itokazu (糸数 慶子; born 1947), Japanese politician
- Keiko Iwasaka (岩阪 恵子; born 1946), Japanese novelist
- Keiko Kasza (born 1951), Japanese American picture book author and illustrator
- Keiko Katsukata (勝方 恵子; born 1947), Okinawan researcher
- Keiko Kawashima (川島 慶子; born 1959), Japanese historian of science
- Keiko Kishi (岸 惠子; born 1932), Japanese actress, writer, and UNFPA Goodwill Ambassador
- Keiko Kitagawa (北川 景子; born 1986), Japanese actress and model
- Keiko Kojima (小島 慶子; born 1972), Japanese tarento, essayist and radio personality
- Keiko Kubota (窪田 啓子; born 1985), Japanese pop singer and a member of the J-pop groups FictionJunction and Kalafina
- Keiko Lee (born 1965), Japanese jazz singer
- Keiko Manabe (真鍋 敬子; born 1987), Japanese field hockey player
- Keiko Masuda (増田 恵子; born 1957), Japanese pop singer and actress
- Keiko Masumoto (桝本 佳子), Japanese artist specializing in contemporary ceramics
- Keiko Matsui (松居 慶子; born 1961), Japanese keyboardist and composer
- Keiko Matsuzaka (松坂 慶子; born 1952), Japanese actress
- Keiko McDonald (ケイコ・マクドナルド; 1940–2008), American orientalist
- Keiko Minami (南 桂子; 1911–2004), Japanese artist, aquatint engraver, and poet
- Keiko Mine (峯 啓子; born 1964), Japanese fencer
- Keiko Miura (三浦 恵子; born 1975), Japanese female field hockey field player
- Keiko Miyagawa (宮川 恵子; born 1986), Japanese sailor
- Keiko Miyajima (宮島 恵子; born 1965), Japanese former volleyball player
- Keiko Mukaide (向出 圭子; born 1954), Japanese artist
- Keiko Muto (武藤 恵子; born 1972), Japanese sprint canoer
- Keiko Nagaoka (永岡 桂子; born 1953), Japanese politician
- Keiko Nagatomi (born 1974), Japanese former professional tennis player
- Keiko Nakagomi (中込 恵子; born 1970), Japanese archer
- Keiko Namai (生井 けい子; born 1951), Japanese women's basketball player
- Keiko Nemoto (根本 圭子; born 1979), Japanese voice actress
- Keiko Nishi (西 炯子; born 1966), Japanese manga artist
- Keiko Nishikawa (ニシカワ ケイコ; born 1948), Japanese physical chemist
- Keiko Nobumoto (信本 敬子; 1964–2021), Japanese screenwriter
- Keiko Nogami (runner) (野上 恵子; born 1985), Japanese long-distance runner
- Keiko Nogami (sailor) (野上 敬子; born 1947), Japanese sailor
- Keiko Ochiai (落合 恵子; born 1945), Japanese author, bookstore owner, radio personality and feminist
- Keiko Oginome (荻野目 慶子; born 1964), Japanese actress
- Keiko Okamoto (岡本 敬子; born 1945), Japanese sprint canoer
- Keiko Onidani (鬼谷 慶子; born 1994), Japanese para-athlete
- Keiko Orrall (born 1967), American politician
- Keiko Osaki (大崎 恵子; born 1942), Japanese diver
- Keiko Ota (大崎 恵子; born 1956), Japanese diver
- Keiko Ota (born 1956), Brazilian politician
- Keiko Ozato, Japanese American geneticist
- Keiko Saito (斉藤 慶子; born 1961), Japanese actress and tarento
- Keikō Sakai (酒井 敬幸; born 1972), Japanese voice actor
- Keiko Sena (せな けいこ; 1932–2024), Japanese illustrator, children's book writer, and kamishibai artist
- Keiko Shimizu (清水 恵子; born 2005), Japanese idol of the idol group Me:I
- Keiko Sonoi (園井 恵子; 1913–1945), Japanese actress
- Keiko Suenobu (すえのぶ けいこ; born 1979), Japanese shōjo manga artist
- Keiko Sugita (杉田 馨子; 1908-1992), Japanese politician
- Keiko Sugiura (杉浦 佳子; born 1970), Japanese road and track cyclist
- Keiko Suzuka (鈴鹿 景子; 1955–2023), Japanese actress
- Keiko Suzuki (すずき けいこ), Japanese voice actress and narrator
- Keiko Taguchi (born 1979), Japanese former professional tennis player
- Keiko Takahashi (高橋 惠子; born 1955), Japanese actress
- Keiko Takemiya (竹宮 惠子; born 1950), Japanese manga artist, professor and university administrator
- Keiko Takeshita (竹下 景子; born 1953), Japanese actress
- Keiko Tamai (玉井 敬子; born 1982), Japanese mixed martial arts fighter
- Keiko Tanaka-Ikeda (田中-池田 敬子; 1933–2023), Japanese female gymnast
- Keiko Tanaka (footballer) (田中 景子; born 1986), Japanese footballer
- Keiko Terada (寺田 恵子; born 1963), Japanese rock singer
- Keiko Teshima (手島 桂子; born 1980), Japanese retired judoka
- Keiko Tobe (戸部 けいこ; 1957–2010), Japanese manga artist
- Keiko Toda (戸田 恵子; born 1957), Japanese actress, singer and narrator
- Keiko Torii (鳥居 啓子; born 1965), Japanese plant scientist and academic teaching
- Keiko Tsuji (辻 恵子; born 1993), Japanese teacher, model and beauty pageant titleholder
- Keiko Tsushima (津島 恵子; 1926–2012), Japanese actress
- Keiko Uchibori (born 1976), Japanese former cricketer
- Keiko Utoku (宇徳 敬子; born 1967), Japanese singer and songwriter
- Keiko Watanabe (渡部 恵子; born 1987), Japanese voice actress
- Keiko Eventius Warman Simbolon (born 2005), Indonesian actor
- Keiko Yamada ((山田 桂子; born 1972), Japanese singer and lead vocalist of the J-pop band Globe
- Keiko Yamada (artist) (山田 圭子; born 1987), Japanese manga artist
- Keiko Yamamoto (山本 圭子; 1940-2024), Japanese voice actress
- Keiko Yokozawa (よこざわ けい子; born 1952), Japanese voice actress, actress, and narrator
- Keiko Yoshitomi (吉冨 桂子; born 1975), Japanese female badminton player
- Mazie Keiko Hirono (広野 慶子; born 1947), American lawyer, politician and the junior United States senator from Hawaii

== Fictional characters ==
- Keiko Arahida, a recurring character played by Yūko Takeuchi in the 2009 TV series FlashForward
- Keiko Ayano, game name Silica, from the light novel, anime, and media series Sword Art Online
- Keiko Hasegawa, a main character in the webcomic Okashina Okashi – Strange Candy
- Keiko Katou, a character from the anime media franchise Strike Witches
- Keiko Larasati Hirosuke, a character from the film Bangkitnya Suster Gepeng. The main cast film, who plays Keiko Larasati Hirosuke is the Jenny Cortez
- Keiko Makino, a character from the manga The Kurosagi Corpse Delivery Service
- Keiko Motoki, a character from the Japanese tokusatsu television series Kamen Rider Kuuga
- Keiko Nekton, a character from the graphic novel The Deep: Here Be Dragons and the following TV series The Deep
- Keiko Nishi, a character from the film The Big Hit, which was released in 1998. China Chow who plays the role of Keiko Nishi in this film
- Keiko O'Brien, a character from Star Trek: The Next Generation and Star Trek: Deep Space Nine
- Keiko Onuki, also Keiko Inoue, a character in the novel and film Battle Royale
- Keiko Yukimura, a character from the manga and anime series YuYu Hakusho

== Animals ==
- Keiko (orca), the orca, or killer whale, who performed in the film Free Willy

== See also ==
- Japanese names
- Japanese writing system
- Svetlana, an equivalent Slavic name
