= Kei (given name) =

- Pronunciation: Kei
- Gender: male

Origin
- Origin: Japanese
- Region of origin: Japanese

Other names
- Related names: Keiko Keisuke

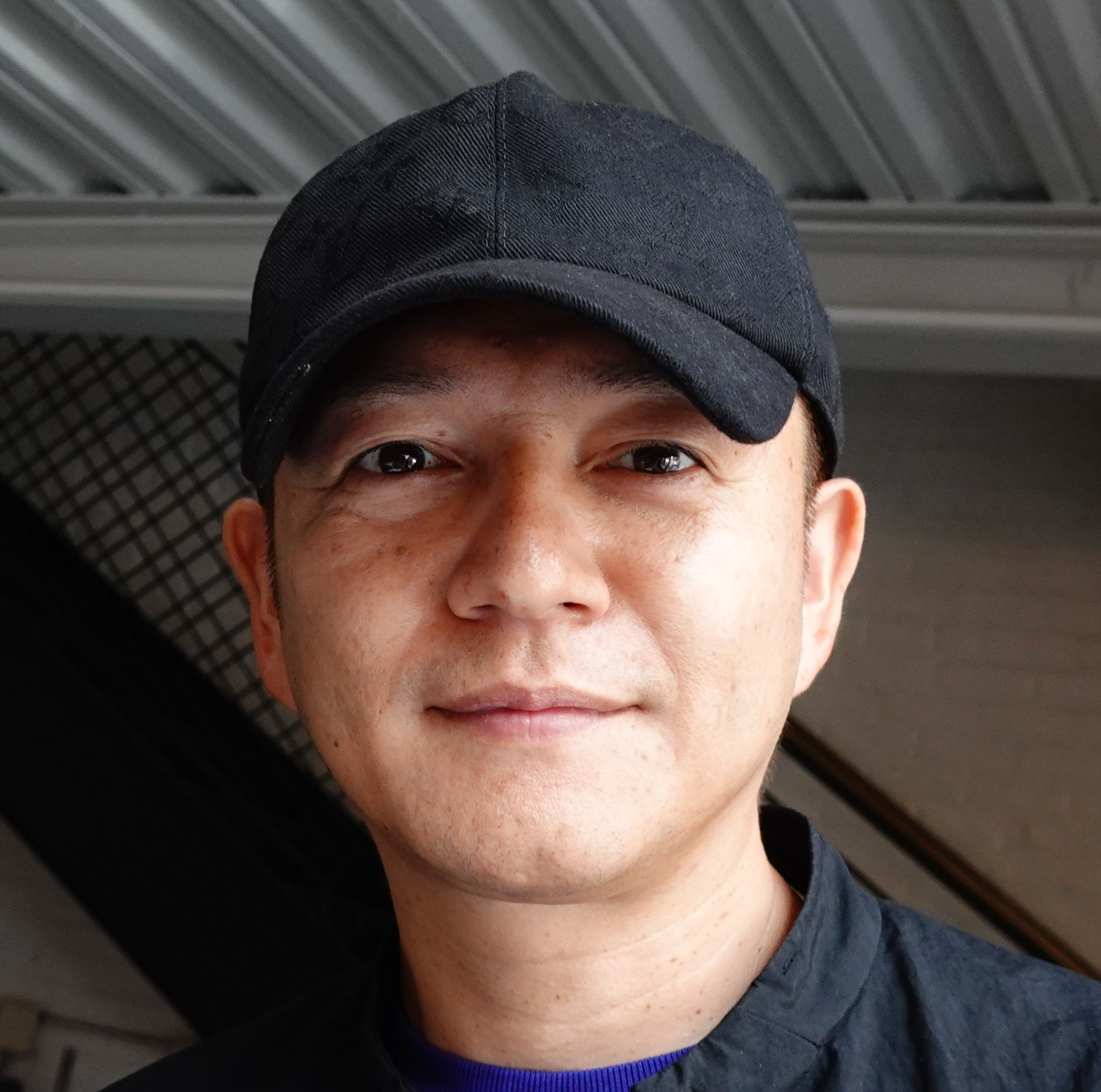
Kei Chika-ura

Kei (けい, ケイ) is a Japanese male's personal name; used increasingly as a female's personal name, as a shortening of Keiko.

== Written forms ==
Kei can be written using different kanji characters and can mean (with Wiktionary links):

- 圭 (圭), "square jewel"
- 恵 (恵), "blessing"
- 慧 (慧), "wise"
- 慶 (慶), "jubilation"
- 敬 (敬), "respect"
- 佳 (佳), "excellent"
- 桂 (桂), "Japanese Judas-tree"
- 啓 (啓), "disclose"
- 硅 (硅), "silicon"

The name can also be written in hiragana or katakana.

== People with the name ==
- Kei (ケイ; born 1957), Japanese singer
- Kei Akagi (赤城 恵; born 1953), Japanese-American jazz pianist
- Kei Aoyama (青山 景; 1979–2011), Japanese manga artist
- Kei Aran (安蘭 けい; born 1970), Japanese actress
- Kei Chinen (知念 慶; born 1995), Japanese footballer
- Kei Cozzolino (born 1987), Japanese-born Italian racing driver
- Kei Enue (えぬえ けい), Japanese manga artist
- Kei Fujiwara (不二稿 京; born 1957), Japanese actress, cinematographer, editor, writer and film director
- Kei Hirose (廣瀬 慧; born 1995), Japanese footballer
- Kei Homma (本間 圭; born 1985), Japanese football manager and coach
- Kei Honda (本田 奎; born 1997), Japanese shogi player
- Kei Horie (堀江 慶; born 1978), Japanese actor and film director
- Kei Hosogai (細貝 圭; born 1984), Japanese actor and musician
- Kei Hosoya (細谷 圭; born 1988), Japanese baseball player
- Kei Igarashi (五十嵐 圭; born 1980), Japanese basketball player
- Kei Igawa (井川 慶; born 1979), Japanese baseball player
- Kei Ikeda (池田 圭; born 1986), Japanese footballer
- Kei Inoo (伊野尾 慧), Japanese singer and actor
- Kei Ishikawa (石川 慧; born 1993), Japanese footballer
- Kei Ito (伊東 慧; born 1991), Japanese photographer and installation artist
- Kei Jonishi (上西 恵; born 1995), Japanese idol and singer
- Key Kobayashi (小林 啓), better known as Kobametal, Japanese music producer
- Kei Koizumi (小泉 慶; born 1995), Japanese footballer
- Kei Kumai (熊井 啓; 1930–2007), Japanese film director
- Kei Kusunoki (楠 桂; born 1966), Japanese manga artist
- Kei Marumo (丸茂 圭衣; born 1992), Japanese synchronized swimmer
- Kei Mikuriya (御厨 景; born 1977), Japanese footballer
- Kei Mizutani (水谷 ケイ; born 1974), Japanese adult film actress
- Kei Morikawa (森川 圭), Japanese film director
- Kei Munechika (宗近 慧; born 1992), Japanese footballer
- Kei Nakano (中野 圭; born 1988), Japanese footballer
- Kei Nakazawa (中沢 けい; born 1959), Japanese writer and academic
- Kei Nishikori (錦織 圭; born 1989), Japanese tennis player
- Kei Nomoto (野本 圭; born 1984), Japanese baseball player
- Kei Ogura (小椋 佳; born 1944), Japanese singer-songwriter and composer
- Kei Omoto (尾本 敬; born 1984), Japanese footballer
- Kei Orihara (折原 恵; born 1948), Japanese photographer
- Oura Kei (大浦 慶; 1828–1884), Japanese businesswoman
- Kei Pilz (died 2001), Japanese chef
- Kei Saito (齋藤 慧; born 1996), Japanese speed skater
- Kei Sanbe (三部 敬), Japanese manga artist
- Kei Satō (佐藤 慶; 1928–2010), Japanese actor
- Kei Shimizu (清水 圭; born 1961), Japanese comedian
- Kei Shindō (真堂 圭; born 1984), Japanese voice actress
- Kei Suma (すま けい; 1935–2013), Japanese actor
- Kei Taguchi (田口 計; born 1933), Japanese actor
- Kei Takahashi (高橋 敬; born 1979), Japanese luger
- Kei Takase (高瀬 慧; born 1988), Japanese sprinter
- Kei Takei (武井 慧; born 1946), Japanese dancer
- Kei Takeoka (竹岡 圭; born 1969), Japanese television personality and motoring journalist
- Kei Tanaka (田中 圭; born 1984), Japanese actor
- Kei Tani (谷 啓; 1932–2010), Japanese comedian, actor and musician
- Kei Tomiyama (富山 敬; 1938–1995), Japanese actor, voice actor and narrator
- Kei Toume (冬目 景; born 1970), Japanese manga artist
- Kei Uemura (植村 慶; born 1981), Japanese footballer
- Kei Yamaguchi (山口 慶; born 1983), Japanese footballer
- Kei Yamamoto (山本 圭; born 1940), Japanese actor
- Kei Yasuda (保田 圭; born 1980), Japanese singer, musician and actress
- Kei Yoshimizu (吉水 慶; born 1940), Japanese actor and voice actor
- Kei Kobayashi (born 1998), Japanese American Professional Surfer

== Other people ==
- Kei (singer) (birthname Kim Ji-yeon, born 1995), South Korean singer of the girl group Lovelyz
- Kei Kamara (born 1984), Sierra Leonean footballer
- Kei Miller (born 1978), Jamaican poet and writer

== Fictional characters ==
- Kei (Akira) (ケイ), protagonist of the manga series Akira
- Kei (Dirty Pair) (ケイ), a character in the manga series Dirty Pair
- Kei (ケイ), a character in the anime series Girls und Panzer
- Kei (Prétear) (蛍), a character in the manga series Prétear
- Kei, a character in the film Moon Child
- Cyberdoll Kei, a character in the anime series Hand Maid May
- Kei Asai (浅井 ケイ), the protagonist of the light novel series Sagrada Reset
- Kei Ashida (芦田 圭), a character in the light novel series Yumemiru Danshi wa Genjitsushugisha
- Kei Ayamine (彩峰 慧), a character in the visual novel series Muv-Luv
- Kei Hatō (羽藤 桂), the protagonist of the visual novel Akai Ito
- Kei Hazuki (葉月 珪), a character in the video game Tokimeki Memorial Girl's Side
- Kei Jinguji, a character from Hyperdimension Neptunia
- Kei Karasuma, a character from Kamen Rider Blade
- Kei Karuizawa (軽井沢 恵), a character in the light novel series Classroom of the Elite
- Kei Kishimoto (岸本 恵), a character in the manga series Gantz
- Kei Kugimiya (クギミヤ・ケイ), a character in the manga series Majestic Prince
- Kei Kuramoto (倉本 圭), a character in the manga series Flying Witch
- Kei Kurono (玄野 計), a character in the manga series Gantz
- Kei Kusanagi (草薙 桂), the protagonist of the anime series Please Teacher!
- Kei Makino (牧野 慶), a character in the PS2 video game Forbidden Siren
- Kei Nagase (永瀬 ケイ), a character in the video game series Ace Combat
- Kei Nijimura (虹村京), a character in the manga series JoJolion
- Kei Niitoki (新刻 敬), a character in the light novel Boogiepop and Others
- Kei Okano (岡野 佳), a character in the manga series Yuyushiki
- Kei Shindo (新藤 景), a character in the visual novel Ef: A Fairy Tale of the Two
- Kei Shirogane (白銀 圭), a character in the manga series Kaguya-sama: Love Is War
- Kei Takishima (滝島 彗), a character in the manga series S · A: Special A
- Kei Tsukikage (月影 ケイ), a character in the anime series Soar High! Isami
- Kei Tsukishima (月島 蛍), a character in the manga series Haikyu!! with the position of middle blocker from Karasuno High
- Kei Yoshikawa (吉川 恵), the protagonist of the manga series The Day of Revolution
- Kei Yuki (有紀 蛍), a character in the manga series Space Pirate Captain Harlock
