= Takeoka =

Takeoka (written: 武岡 or 竹岡) is a Japanese surname. Notable people with the surname include:

- Kei Takeoka (竹岡 圭, born 1969), Japanese television personality and motoring journalist
- Yuto Takeoka (武岡 優斗, born 1986), Japanese footballer

== See also ==
- Takeoka Station, a railway station in Futtsu, Chiba Prefecture, Japan
