= Mugihito =

Japanese actor, voice actor and narrator (born 1944)

- 麦人
- Born: Makoto Terada; August 8, 1944 (age 82); Musashino, Tokyo, Japan
- Other name: Mugihito Amachi
- Occupations: Actor; voice actor; narrator
- Years active: 1950–present
- Agent: Jagaimo-mura (Potato Village)
- Website: www.mugihito.com

Makoto Terada (寺田 誠, Terada Makoto; born August 8, 1944), better known by his stage name of Mugihito (麦人), is a Japanese actor, voice actor and narrator from Musashino, Tokyo. Mugihito was formerly credited under his birth name and also Mugihito Amachi (天地 麦人, Amachi Mugihito).

== Filmography ==
=== Television animation ===
1976

- Dokaben (Domon)

1978

- Future Boy Conan (Many minor characters)

1979

- Mobile Suit Gundam (Rose)

1980

- Space Battleship Yamato III (Dagon)

1981

- Dogtanian and the Three Muskehounds (Original Japanese version' WanWan Sanjushi) (Cardinal Richelieu)
- Dr. Slump (Bubibinman)
- Urusei Yatsura (Mendou's Father)

1982

- Andromeda Stories (as "Makoto Terada") (Shopkeep)
- Asari-chan Ai no Marchen Shōjo (Kanpachi)
- Sasuga no Sarutobi (Torazô Demon)

1983

- Ai Shite Knight (Kumahachi, Fujiki)
- Armored Trooper Votoms (Kanzellman)

1984

- The Super Dimension Cavalry Southern Cross (Rolf Emerson)

1986

- Maison Ikkoku (Mitaka's Uncle)

1987

- City Hunter (Announcer)

1990

- Robin Hood (Richard I of England)

1992

- Crayon Shin-chan (Shijuurou Ōhara)
- Tekkaman Blade (Kouza Aiba)

1993

- The Irresponsible Captain Tylor (Vice Admiral Mifune)

1994

- Mobile Fighter G Gundam (Kyral Mekirel)

1995

- Neon Genesis Evangelion (Seele Leader Keel Lorenz)

1996

- City Hunter: The Secret Service (Gonzales)
- Ijiwaru Baa-san (1996 edition) (Jun'ichi)

1997

- One Piece (Tamago)

1998

- Master Keaton (Victor)

1999

- Betterman (Mugito Mamon)
- Corrector Yui (Professor Inukai, Grosser)
- Crest of the Stars (Former Baron Febdash Sluf)
- Hoshin Engi (Kiyou)
- Starship Girl Yamamoto Yohko (Zenger)

2000

- Inuyasha (Spider Head)
- Saiyuki (Jade Emperor)
- Vandread (Grand Pa)

2001

- Babel II (Yomi)
- Baki the Grappler (Doppo Orochi)
- Cyborg 009 (Dr. Gilmore)
- Rune Soldier Louie (Carwess)
- The SoulTaker (Daigo Tokisaka)

2002

- Bomberman Jetters (Souto Bagura)
- Mirmo! (Jidan)
- Princess Tutu (Karon)
- Seven of Seven (Rokuzo Suzuki)

2003

- Papuwa (Itou, Kamui)
- Someday's Dreamers (Kazuo Takahashi)

2004

- Keroro Gunsō (Bob)
- Kyo Kara Maoh! (Maxine)
- Monkey Turn (Kanichi Koike)
- Ragnarok: The Animation (Baphomet)
- Rockman EXE Stream (Cardamon)
- Tsukuyomi -Moon Phase- (Ryuuhei Midou)
- Yu-Gi-Oh! Duel Monsters GX (Kagemaru)

2005

- Basilisk: The Kouga Ninja Scrolls (Nankobo Tenkai)
- Eureka Seven (Braya)
- Honey and Clover (Professor Shouda)
- Oh My Goddess! (Oshō)
- Pani Poni Dash! (Alien Commander)
- Patalliro Saiyuki! (God)

2006

- Binbou Shimai Monogatari (Genzou Hayashi)
- Crash B-Daman (Kyouju Toriga)
- Gintama (Old Man)
- Negima!? (Narration)
- Shōnen Onmyōji (Abe no Seimei)
- Souten no Ken (Old Kasumi Ramon)

2008

- Ga-Rei: Zero (Naraku Isayama)
- (Zoku) Sayonara, Zetsubou-Sensei (Otonashi Meru's father)
- Strike Witches (Junzaburo Sugita)

2009

- Fresh Pretty Cure! (Genkichi Momozono)
- Umineko no Naku Koro ni (Kinzô Ushiromiya)

2012

- Tamagotchi! (Mannenphiltchi)
- The Ambition of Oda Nobuna (Dōsan Saitō)

2014

- No Game No Life (Ino Hatsuse)
- Space Dandy (Dr. H)
- Tokyo ESP (Sukezaburou)

2015

- Cute High Earth Defense Club Love! (Wombat, Mr Tawarayama)
- Mobile Suit Gundam: Iron-Blooded Orphans (Togonosuke Makanai)

2016

- Cute High Earth Defense Club LOVE! LOVE! (Wombat)
- The Great Passage (Tomosuke Matsumoto)
- Re:Zero − Starting Life in Another World (Old Man Rom)
- Kamiwaza Wanda (Don Bugdez)

2017

- Senki Zesshō Symphogear AXZ (Fudō Kazanari)

2019

- Fairy Gone (Cain Distaroru)
- Dr. Stone (Kaseki)
- Kochoki: Wakaki Nobunaga (Hirate Masahide)
- Senki Zesshō Symphogear XV (Fudō Kazanari)

2020

- Jujutsu Kaisen (Yoshinobu Gakuganji)

2021

- Peach Boy Riverside (Kiki)
- How a Realist Hero Rebuilt the Kingdom (Albert Elfrieden)
- Tesla Note (Jingo Negoro)

2022

- Shinobi no Ittoki (Jūzen Jiraibо̄)

2023

- Reborn to Master the Blade: From Hero-King to Extraordinary Squire (Old King Inglis)

2024

- Fairy Tail: 100 Years Quest (Elefseria)

=== ONA ===
- JoJo's Bizarre Adventure: Stone Ocean (2022) (Kenzou)
- Lupin III vs Cat's Eye (2023) (Sadatsugu Nagaishi)

=== OVA ===
- Devil Hunter Yohko (1990) (Demon World Voice)
- Dragon Knight (1991) (Dragon Knight Overlord)
- Getter Robo Armageddon (1998) (Professor Saotome)
- Iria: Zeiram the Animation (1994) (Puttubayh)
- Kyokujitsu no Kantai (1997) (Shōin Tomimori)
- JoJo's Bizarre Adventure (2001) (J. Geil)
- The Day of Sigma (2005) (Sigma)
- Seven of Seven (2002) (Rokuzo Suzuki)
- Urusei Yatsura (1985) (Mendou's Father)
- Vandread (2001) (Grand Pa)

=== Theatrical animation ===
- Be Forever Yamato (1980) (Kazan)
- Urusei Yatsura: Only You (1983) (Lum's Commander)
- Mobile Suit Gundam (1981) (Rose)
- Nausicaä of the Valley of the Wind (1984) (Mayor of Pejite)
- Urusei Yatsura 4: Lum the Forever (1986) (Mendou's Father)
- Tekkonkinkreet (2006) (The Boss)
- Ghost in the Shell: The New Movie (2015) (Robert Lee)
- The Night Is Short, Walk On Girl (2017) (Ri Haku)
- Burn the Witch (2020) (Wolfgang Slashhaut)
- Cute High Earth Defense Club Eternal Love! (2025) (Wombat)

=== Tokusatsu ===
- Ike! Ushiwaka Kotarou (1974) (yokai) (Name: Makoto Terada)
- Akumaizer 3 (1976) (Dracurda (ep. 20)) (Name: Makoto Terada)
- Shuriken Sentai Ninninger (2015) (Gengetsu Kibaoni (eps. 1 – 5, 13, 19, 34, 44 – 47)

=== Video games ===
Year	Title	Role	Console	Source
1998	Xenogears	Ricardo "Rico" Banderas, Grahf, Kahn Wong		
1999	The Legend of Dragoon	Librarian Ute		
2000	Skies of Arcadia	Drachma		
2001	Inuyasha	Spider Head	PlayStation	
2003	Mega Man X7	Sigma, Snipe Anteator		
2005	Mega Man X8	Sigma, VAVA V		
2005	Mega Man Maverick Hunter X	Sigma		
2007	Lost Odyssey	Roxian		
2008	Tales of Hearts	Zeks		
2010	Metal Gear Solid: Peace Walker	Hot Coldman		
2010	Umineko When They Cry	Kinzo Ushiromiya		
2011	Tales of Xillia	Rowen J. Illbert		
2011	Ni no Kuni: Wrath of the White Witch	Old Father Oak		
2013	Metal Gear Rising: Revengeance	Wilhelm "Doktor" Voigt		
2016	Kirby: Planet Robobot	President Haltmann		
2017	Nioh	Nekomata		
2018	Ni no Kuni II: Revenant Kingdom	Pugnacius		
2019	Dragon Quest XI	Rab		

- Mortal Kombat 3 (1995), Narrator – Japanese PlayStation Release
- Mega Man X4 (1997), Sigma
- Heart of Darkness (1998), Master of Darkness
- Ace Combat 3: Electrosphere (1999), Gilbert Park
- Growlanser III: The Dual Darkness (2001), Gerhard Auvers
- Jak and Daxter: The Precursor Legacy (2001), Red Sage – Japanese Dub
- Mega Man X6 (2001), Sigma, Metal Shark Player
- SkyGunner (2001), Ventre
- Super Robot Wars MX (2004), Kiral Mekrial
- Valkyrie Profile: Lenneth (2006), Ganossa, Jake Linas's Father, Lorenta's Husband
- BioShock (2007), Sander Cohen – Japanese dub
- Kane & Lynch: Dead Men (2007), Lynch – Japanese Dub
- Castlevania: Lords of Shadow (2010), Zobek
- Fate/Extra (2010), Dan Blackmore
- 2nd Super Robot Wars Z (2011), Professor Saotome
- Terror of the Stratus (2011), Takenosu Iwao
- Anarchy Reigns (2012), Douglas
- Tales of Xillia 2 (2012), Rowen J. Ilbert
- Lego Marvel Super Heroes (2013), Professor X – Japanese Dub
- Sonic Lost World (2013), Master Zik
- Project X Zone 2 (2015), Sigma
- Kirby: Planet Robobot (2016), President Haltmann
- Shin Megami Tensei IV: Apocalypse (2016), YHVH
- Horizon Zero Dawn (2017), HADES – Japanese Dub

=== Dubbing roles ===
==== Live-action ====
- Patrick Stewart
  - Star Trek: The Next Generation (Jean-Luc Picard second voice (after Kei Yoshimizu))
  - Death Train (Malcolm Philpott)
  - Star Trek Generations (Jean-Luc Picard)
  - Star Trek: First Contact (Jean-Luc Picard)
  - Star Trek: Insurrection (Jean-Luc Picard)
  - X-Men (2003 TV Asahi edition) (Professor X)
  - Star Trek: Nemesis (Jean-Luc Picard)
  - X2 (2006 TV Asahi edition) (Professor X)
  - The Game of Their Lives (Older Dent McSkimming)
  - Mysterious Island (Captain Nemo)
  - X-Men: The Last Stand (2009 TV Asahi edition) (Professor X)
  - Logan (Charles Xavier)
  - Dragonheart: Battle for the Heartfire (Drago)
  - The Kid Who Would Be King (Old Merlin)
  - Charlie's Angels (John Bosley)
  - Star Trek: Picard (Jean-Luc Picard)
  - Doctor Strange in the Multiverse of Madness (Charles Xavier)
  - Avengers: Doomsday (Charles Xavier)
- Ben Kingsley
  - House of Sand and Fog (Colonel Massoud Amir Behrani)
  - Thunderbirds (The Hood)
  - The Dictator (Tamir)
  - Ender's Game (Mazer Rackham)
  - Iron Man 3 (Trevor Slattery)
  - Robot Overlords (Robin Smythe)
  - The Walk (Papa Rudy)
  - Shang-Chi and the Legend of the Ten Rings (Trevor Slattery)
- Ace Ventura: Pet Detective (2025 BS10 Star Channel edition) (Mr. Finkle (Bill Zuckert))
- The Addams Family (Fester Addams (Christopher Lloyd))
- Aliens (1992 VHS/DVD edition) (Bishop (Lance Henriksen))
- Aliens (1989 TV Asahi edition) (Sergeant Al Apone (Al Matthews))
- Arachnophobia (Delbert McClintock (John Goodman))
- Baahubali: The Beginning (Kattappa (Sathyaraj))
- Baahubali 2: The Conclusion (Kattappa (Sathyaraj))
- Bill & Ted's Bogus Journey (Col. Oats (Chelcie Ross))
- The Blacklist: Redemption (Howard Hargrave (Terry O'Quinn))
- The Blues Brothers (1983 Fuji TV edition) (Reverend Cleophus James (James Brown))
- The Bodyguard (Old Man #2 (Karl Maka))
- Coming 2 America (Cleo McDowell (John Amos))
- Conan the Barbarian (1989 TV Asahi edition) (Rexor (Ben Davidson))
- The Crow (Top Dollar (Michael Wincott))
- CSI: Crime Scene Investigation (Jim Brass (Paul Guilfoyle))
- Cyborg (VHS edition) (Fender Tremolo (Vincent Klyn))
- Dances with Wolves (Timmons (Robert Pastorelli))
- Deep Rising (2000 TV Asahi edition) (Hanover (Wes Studi))
- Desperado (1998 TV Asahi edition) (Bartender (Cheech Marin))
- Die Hard (1990 TV Asahi edition) (Special Agent Johnson (Robert Davi))
- Die Hard 2 (Sergeant Al Powell (Reginald VelJohnson))
- Die Hard 2 (1994 TV Asahi edition) (Major Grant (John Amos))
- The Distinguished Gentleman (Elijah Hawkins (Charles S. Dutton))
- Doctor Sleep (Dick Hallorann (Carl Lumbly))
- Dr. Quinn, Medicine Woman (Robert E. (Henry G. Sanders))
- End of Days (Bobby Chicago (Kevin Pollak))
- Falling Down (1997 TV Asahi edition) (Nick (Frederic Forrest))
- Gandhi (1987 Fuji TV edition) (Brigadier General Reginald Dyer (Edward Fox))
- Geronimo: An American Legend (Geronimo (Wes Studi))
- The Godfather (2001 DVD, 2008 Blu-ray and TV Tokyo editions) (Don Vito Corleone (Marlon Brando))
- The Golden Compass (Farder Coram (Tom Courtenay))
- Growing Pains (Sid (Kenneth Tigar))
- A History of Violence (Richie Cusack (William Hurt))
- IF (Lewis (Louis Gossett Jr.))
- It (2002 NHK Edition) (Pennywise the Dancing Clown (Tim Curry))
- Jurassic World (Hal Osterly (James DuMont))
- Kickboxer (Eric Sloane (Dennis Alexio))
- Kill Switch (The Coroner (Isaac Hayes))
- Knight Rider (K.A.R.R.)
- Last Action Hero (John Practice (F. Murray Abraham))
- The Last Castle (Jim Wheeler (Delroy Lindo))
- Licence to Kill (TV edition) (Franz Sanchez (Robert Davi))
- A Life Less Ordinary (2001 TV Asahi edition) (Jackson (Delroy Lindo))
- Lost (John Locke (Terry O'Quinn))
- The Lost World: Jurassic Park (Roland Tembo (Pete Postlethwaite))
- Mackenna's Gold (Old Adams (Edward G. Robinson))
- Mad Max 2 (1997 TV Asahi edition) (The Humungus (Kjell Nilsson))
- The Man Who Invented Christmas (Jacob Marley (Donald Sumpter))
- The Marine 2 (Church (Michael Rooker))
- Marked for Death (Max Keller (Keith David))
- The Matrix Reloaded (2006 Fuji TV edition) (Councillor Hamann (Anthony Zerbe))
- The Matrix Revolutions (2007 Fuji TV edition) (Councillor Hamann (Anthony Zerbe))
- Mission: Impossible (Jim Phelps (Peter Graves))
- Money Talks (Raymond Villard)
- The Mummy (Pharaoh Seti I (Aharon Ipalé))
- The Mummy Returns (Baltus Hafez (Alun Armstrong))
- My Own Private Idaho (Bob Pigeon (William Richert))
- Naked Gun 33 1/3: The Final Insult (Rocco Dillon (Fred Ward))
- The Next Karate Kid (Sergeant Keisuke Miyagi (Pat Morita))
- Night of the Living Dead (Harry Cooper (Tom Towles))
- Out for Justice (1994 TV Asahi edition) (Richie Madano (William Forsythe))
- The Peacemaker (Gen. Aleksandr Kodoroff (Aleksandr Baluev))
- Phenomena (2020 Blu-ray edition) (Professor John McGregor (Donald Pleasence))
- Platoon (1989 TV Asahi edition) (Rhah (Francesco Quinn))
- The Practice (Denny Crane (William Shatner))
- Predator (Mac Eliot (Bill Duke))
- The Princess Diaries 2: Royal Engagement (Joe (Héctor Elizondo))
- Rambo III (1994 TV Asahi edition) (Colonel Zaysen (Marc de Jonge))
- Raw Deal (1991 TV Asahi edition) (Max Keller (Robert Davi))
- Red Heat (1990 TV Asahi edition) (Viktor Rostavili / Viktor Rosta (Ed O'Ross))
- Remo Williams: The Adventure Begins (Conn 'Mac' MacCleary (J. A. Preston))
- RoboCop 3 (Kanemitsu (Mako))
- The Rock (2000 TV Asahi edition) (Ernest Paxton (William Forsythe))
- The Running Man (1990 TV Asahi edition) (William Laughlin (Yaphet Kotto))
- Scarface (1991 TV Tokyo edition) (Omar Suarez (F. Murray Abraham))
- Scrooged (The Ghost of Christmas Past (David Johansen))
- Shoebox Zoo (Michael Scot (Peter Mullan))
- Single White Female (Mitch Myerson (Stephen Tobolowsky))
- Small Soldiers (Archer (Frank Langella))
- Star Wars: Episode I – The Phantom Menace (Watto (Andy Secombe))
- Star Wars: Episode II – Attack of the Clones (Watto (Andy Secombe))
- Street Fighter (Sagat (Wes Studi))
- Switchback (Bob Goodall (Danny Glover))
- Thank You for Smoking (Senator Ortolan Finistirre (William H. Macy))
- They Live (1990 TV Asahi edition) (Drifter/Collaborator (George Buck Flower))
- Top Gun (1989 Fuji TV edition) (LCDR Rick "Jester" Heatherly (Michael Ironside))
- Top Gun (2009 TV Tokyo edition) (CDR Tom "Stinger" Jordan (James Tolkan))
- The Towering Inferno (1984 Nippon TV edition) (Harry Jernigan (O. J. Simpson))
- Two Much (Gene (Danny Aiello))
- Uncommon Valor (1987 NTV edition) (Charts (Tim Thomerson))
- The Unknown Woman (Matteo (Alessandro Haber))
- The Untouchables (Al Capone (William Forsythe))
- V (Ham Tyler (Michael Ironside))
- The Wraith (1992 TV Asahi edition) (Sheriff Loomis (Randy Quaid))
- The Young Indiana Jones Chronicles (Remy Baudouin (Ronny Coutteure))
- Zack Snyder's Justice League (DeSaad (Peter Guinness))

==== Animation ====
- Adventure Time (Gumbald)
- Baahubali: The Lost Legends (Kattappa)
- Batman: The Animated Series (Professor Hugo Strange)
- Cars (Sarge)
- Cars 2 (Sarge)
- Cars 3 (Sarge)
- Home on the Range (Jeb the Goat)
- Looney Tunes (The Tasmanian Devil)
- Monkey King: Hero Is Back (Old Monk)
- Pucca (Tobe, season 1)
- Ratatouille (Django)
- Spider-Man (Uncle Ben, Kingpin, Red Skull, others)
- Spider-Man and His Amazing Friends (Uncle Ben, Kingpin, Red Skull)
- X-Men (Toon Disney edition) (Red Skull)
