= Yoshimizu =

Yoshimizu is a surname. Notable people with the surname include:

- Kagami Yoshimizu (born 1977), Japanese manga author
- Kei Yoshimizu (born 1940), Japanese actor
- Norio Yoshimizu (born 1946), Japanese footballer
- Takahiro Yoshimizu (born 1968), Japanese voice actor
