= Keiko Tanaka =

Keiko Tanaka may refer to:

- Keiko Tanaka-Ikeda, Japanese gymnast
- Keiko Tanaka (footballer)
- Keiko Tanaka (jp), the spouse of Rikidōzan
- Keiko Tanaka (jp), Japanese animator
- Keiko Tanaka (jp), Japanese pianist
- Keiko Tanaka (jp), Japanese violist and composer
