= Seven of Seven =

Japanese anime television series

- North American cover of the first manga volume

七人のナナ (Shichinin no Nana)
- Genre: Comedy
- Manga
- Written by: Yasuhiro Imagawa
- Illustrated by: Azusa Kunihiro
- Published by: Akita Shoten
- English publisher: US: ADV Manga
- Magazine: Weekly Shōnen Champion
- Original run: November 8, 2001 – May 25, 2002
- Volumes: 3
- Anime television series
- Directed by: Yasuhiro Imagawa
- Produced by: Nobuhiro Oosawa; Keisuke Iwata; Tatsuji Yamazaki
- Written by: Yasuhiro Imagawa
- Music by: Yoshihisa Hirano
- Studio: A.C.G.T
- Licensed by: US: Anime Works
- Original network: TV Tokyo
- Original run: January 10, 2002 – June 27, 2002
- Episodes: 25 + OVA

Seven of Seven (七人のナナ, Shichinin no Nana) is a Japanese anime television series created by Yasuhiro Imagawa (Giant Robo, G Gundam) and produced by A.C.G.T.

The TV series premiered January 10, 2002, on TV Tokyo and finished in run on June 27, 2002, totaling 25 episodes. A New Year's special episode was included in the seventh DVD volume (KIBA-745) released on October 2 of the same year. Due to production schedules, the manga adaptation, illustrated by Azusa Kunihiro, started serialization in Akita Shoten's Shōnen Champion on November 8, 2001, two months before the anime premiere. The manga ended on May 25, 2002, and collected in three volumes.

== Title ==
The title Seven of Seven or Shichinin no Nana is a pun, as the main character's name, Nana, also means 'seven' in Japanese. It relates the premise of the series, where Nana has split into seven different sides of the personality due to an accident with a crystal. In addition, Nana Suzuki's name is a reference to namesake Nana Mizuki, who voices the character of Nana in the anime.

== Plot ==
The plots of the anime and the manga differ.

=== Anime synopsis ===
After seeing a rainbow as a child and being mesmerized by its beauty, Nana's grandfather has been trying all his life to capture the beauty of a rainbow within a crystallized form. After years of failed attempts and crazy inventions, such as a VCR toaster and vacuum cleaning mouse catcher, he finally discovers a way to make such a crystallized rainbow. His plan would work by separating the light from a rainbow into its seven basic colors and then reforming it into seven colorized crystals. His experiment was working too and only needed a few seconds in the microwave to be complete and finally fulfill his dream. That is when Nana, who was searching for the microwave in an attempt to bake a chocolate cake for Yuichi Kamichika (her crush), opened the door before the crystal had fully hardened and caused an accident.

The crystal glowed and split into the seven different colors of the rainbow, hitting Nana as one color and then coming out of her in the seven colors of the rainbow, creating seven different Nanas. Six different aspects of Nana's personality suddenly exist (acting to a more extreme extent) alongside the original in their own separate physical forms: there's a giggly Nana, a sleepy Nana, a crybaby Nana, a grumpy Nana, a flirtatious Nana, and an intellectual Nana. However, they're all still technically the same person, which includes Nana's crush on Yuichi. This is clearly seen when all the Nanas work together in perfect sync with each other (as if they're still just one person) to make him a chocolate cake for Valentine's Day. But once the cake is done, they immediately start fighting over who will give it to Yuichi.

Each Nana grabs one of the crystals that formed from the one crystal her grandfather was trying to harden in the microwave and realizes it gives her superpowers, she can fly, has super strength and super speed. This leads to a chase between the original Nana, and the new six sides of her personality who are all fighting as they fly and destroy parts of town over who will give the cake to Yuichi. But once they're finally done fighting, they once again prove that all seven Nanas are still the same person as they all find themselves too nervous to approach Yuichi and actually give him the cake.

The crystals also hold another power seen later on as Nana wears a costume from an anime series that she (and the other Nanas) loved as a child called the "Nana Rangers". While they are wearing the costume and at the same time carrying their crystals the prop costumes turn into the real "Nana Rangers" costumes allowing them at times to be Superheroes, and also all show themselves in public at once, since Nana and the others realize the danger of all being seen at the same time without some way of hiding that they're all the same person.

After they had settled on their roles, the 7 Nanas also face the fact that if the crystals aren't reintegrated within a year after the split, all 7 of them will disappear. Later, the 8th one appears causing chaos.

=== Manga synopsis ===
This story has no super power elements.

Nana Suzuki's father returns from a trip abroad, and he gives Nana a crystal that he had bought from a gypsy woman. He tells her the gypsy woman's warning, to never let the light of the moon pass through the crystal. That night Nana hangs the crystal in front of her window; there is a moon visible through the window. In the morning Nana wakes to find six other Nanas in bed with her.

Initially, Nana Suzuki goes to school and the other six Nanas stay home. The six quickly rebel against that plan. They take advantage of an opportunity to blackmail the principal of the school into letting all of them attend school, in the same class. The Nanas also quickly realize that it is confusing for all of them to be called "Nana", so they agree on nicknames for each of them.

Yuichi isn't the least bit bothered that there are now seven Nanas in his class. He doesn't show any favoritism towards any one of the Nanas over the others.

== Characters ==
- Nana Suzuki (鈴木 ナナ, Suzuki Nana) is Nana in her original form, and the one form that remains even when the other parts of her personality split from her. Shy and very timid, she has had a crush on a boy in her class named Yuichi for as long as she can remember, and yet has been too nervous to approach him and tell him how she feels. This has led to Hayashiba, Kogarashi and Morinuma, three girls who eventually end up being her friends as the story progresses, to tease and torment her as they try to vie for Yuichi's attention. She is also the only Nana to simply be called "Nana". Her color is blue. In the anime television series, Nana is voiced by Nana Mizuki in Japanese and Veronica Taylor in English.
- Nanappe (ナナっぺ) is the "Hot-Tempered Nana". She is a tomboy with a short temper and a hotheaded personality. She likes to fight and work out. She has narrow pupils and her color is red. In the anime television series, Nanappe is voiced by Sumomo Momomori in Japanese and Veronica Taylor in English.
- Nanakko (ナナっこ) is the "Easygoing Nana". She is laid-back and has an affinity for merchandise regarding Billy the fish mascot. She takes a relaxed approach to life, even with an approaching deadline, and speaks with a childish and congested voice. Due to her easygoing personality, she is often seen as slow and unintelligent by the other Nanas, with Nanapon even attempting to trick her on multiple occasions. She has lighter colored pupils, and her color is orange. In the anime television series, Nanakko is voiced by Madoka Akita in Japanese and Veronica Taylor in English.
- Nanacchi (ナナっち) is the "Smiling Nana". She is happy-go-lucky, always has a smile on her face and has a positive outlook on everything. She likes movies, especially funny ones, and she is very friendly and easy to get along with. Her color is yellow. In the anime television series, Nanacchi is voiced by Mai Asaki in Japanese and Veronica Taylor in English.
- Nanarin (ナナりん) is the "Crybaby Nana". She is very sensitive, up to the point that almost anything can make her cry. Her power allows her to emit sonic waves from her voice when she cries loudly, and the only way to make her stop is to calm her down by stroking the back of her head. Her color is chartreuse ("yellow green" in the English dub). In the anime television series, Nanarin is voiced by Yukari Fukui in Japanese and Veronica Taylor in English.
- Nanasama (ナナさま) is the "Brainy Nana". She is intelligent yet stubborn. She likes books and manga. The title of the book she always reads is Les Misérables. She always speaks with immaculate enunciation, and she is the only Nana who wears glasses. Her color is green. In the anime television series, Nanasama is voiced by Mai Nakahara in Japanese and Veronica Taylor in English.
- Nanapon (ナナぽん) is the "Ghostly Nana". She is flirty and mysterious, and she likes spiritual things. She has been shown to be capable of fortune telling, and she possesses weak telekinetic powers. She also has the essence of feminine physique, obtaining impressive measurements in the school physical, and being able to use her breasts to hide small objects. At one time, she used her prism to hypnotize the other Nanas into cleaning the house, and eventually accidentally hypnotizes herself while trying to teach the original Nana hypnosis. This results in her putting the entire town in a trance in an attempt to see Yuichi's high school survey. Her color is purple. In the anime television series, Nanapon is voiced by Kaori Nazuka in Japanese and Veronica Taylor in English.
- Jamanana (ジャマナナ) is the dark side of Nana or the "Eighth Nana". She first appears on New Year's, planning on interfering with Nana's plans. Disturbingly, Hitomi cannot tell her apart from the others. While she, like the other Nanas, ultimately wants Nana to succeed, she is not beyond using less-than-moral methods such as sabotage to ensure Nana's success, which at one point ends up backfiring. She has proven to be more powerful than the other six combined. She can hypnotize people, even without carrying her crystal. As a Nana Ranger, she has white hair and wears a jagged red scarf, sharp ears, and inward curving horns on the helmet, and does not need a costume to transform. Her color is black. In the anime television series, Jamanana is voiced by Nana Mizuki in Japanese and Veronica Taylor in English.
- Hitomi Onodera (小野寺 瞳, Onodera Hitomi) is Nana's closest and oldest friend. She tries to support Nana in her quest to tell Yuichi how she really feels. Her parents also own a restaurant which she and Nana go to each year and have a yearly party. Hitomi is also the one that seems to know Nana better than Nana knows herself and can easily tell who is who after they split into seven individual parts of the same personality. She has completely different looking eyes without glasses, a feature she used to disguise herself. In the anime television series, Hitomi is voiced by Miyu Matsuki in Japanese and Rachael Lillis in English.
- Yuichi Kamichika (神近 優一, Kamichika Yuichi) is Nana's crush. He is into photography and is continually taking pictures around town. He is also very smart, which is part of why Nana lacks the confidence to confess to him, as she often struggles to keep up with him academically. She longs to go to the same high school as him, however his school of choice has very high entry requirements. Unfortunately, it is later discovered that he has feelings for another girl, even taking up photography and trying to get into her high school to impress her. Usually kind and open, he comes to see Nana as a good friend. However, he is completely oblivious to all the girls around him who have a crush on him. At the end, he finds out that Nana has a crush on him. In the anime television series, Yuichi is voiced by Akira Ishida in Japanese and Michael Sinterniklaas in English.
- Mr. Minoru Handa (半田 実, Handa Minoru) is the assistant principal of the junior high school. He is often very harsh with the students and tends to push Nana and the other students very hard. However, it is revealed that he actually has a lot of respect for his students, and ultimately pushes them because he wants them to succeed. He defends Nana when she is refused a chance to enter her chosen high school after Jamanana hurts Tsuki, noting that while Nana was looked down upon by members of the honors class, she has since worked hard to become one of its top students and would not be so foolish as to throw it all away. As a prank, the trio once referred to him as "melonhead", and when the term catches on, he is initially angered by it, but he eventually sees the humor in it, and even willingly refers to himself as such. In the anime television series, Mr. Handa is voiced by Minoru Inaba in Japanese and Marc Thompson in English.
- Mr. Takeyuki Maruoka (丸岡 雄之, Maruoka Takeyuki) is the school guidance counselor. He can also come across as harsh at times, but also ultimately wants to help the students, and is a caring person on the inside. Hitomi develops somewhat of a crush on him after he caringly gave her his jacket when she was in the cold during Christmas, not realizing it was her when she was not wearing her glasses. In the anime television series, Mr. Maruoka is voiced by Yūji Mikimoto in Japanese and Dan Green in English.
- Megumi Hayashiba (林葉 めぐみ, Hayashiba Megumi), Erino Kogarashi (木枯 えりの, Kogarashi Erino) and Motoko Morinuma (森沼 もとこ, Morinuma Motoko) are three girls in Nana's grade who initially tease and torment her, but soon see how hard Nana is working and will stand up for her when they think she deserves some credit and support her endeavors to get into high school. The three girls have the worst marks in school but want to enter the same high school and are impressed that Nana managed to move from their level to the honors class with Yuichi and Hitomi. Hayashiba, the leader of the group, is a childhood friend of Nana's and a very talented Japanese dancer, Kogarashi is a sneaky girl who brags about people, and Morinuma is the girl with fish lips who wears baggy pants all the time and turns out to be kind and empathetic. Hayashiba eventually chose a Japanese dancing school, a different choice from Kogarashi and Morinuma, as a promise to her grandfather to become a maiko dancer. After the graduation, Morinuma went to a nursing school, Kogarashi entered a special school to become a cartoon voice actress. In the anime television series, Hayashiba, Kogarashi and Morinuma is voiced by Megumi Kobayashi, Erino Hazuki and Motoko Kumai in Japanese and Tara Sands, Mena Roberts and Kerry Williams in English.
- Mayor (町長) is the owner of the 7 of Seven convenience store. He lent the "Nana Rangers" costumes to Rokuzo, who claimed to have found seven girls working for the school festival. After the girls wearing their costumes had saved Mayor from a scooter gang, he let them keep the costumes as a gift. In the anime television series, Mayor is voiced by Tatsuyuki Ishimori in Japanese and Jimmy Zoppi in English.
- Tsukie Kayano (萱野 月枝, Kayano Tsukie) is a childhood friend of Yuichi and a seeming rival to Nana for his affections. Tsukie is currently in her last year at the junior high division of Yasaka Oogi and studies hard in obtain a good placement for when she moves on to the high school division. Yuichi and Nana have both applied for the high school division, despite how difficult it will be to enter. Her focus on her schoolwork leads her to reject Yuichi's feelings for her and, after criticizing Nana for spending time doing things other than studying, gains the dislike of the trio of girls supporting Nana. Tsukie, brilliant and focused, is the reason why Yuichi is so smart. He wants to get into the same high school as her and studies as hard as he can, like Nana is attempting to do to stay with Yuichi. She loves art, but because members of her family have traditionally become doctors, she is expected to study medicine and go to university. After becoming friends with Nana, she decides to study art instead of medicine at her high school. In the anime television series, Tsukie is voiced by Tomoko Kotani in Japanese and Erica Schroeder in English.
- Rokuzo Suzuki (鈴木 六造, Suzuki Rokuzo) is Nana's grandfather. He lives with Nana and acts as her guardian while her parents are living and working overseas in the United States. He spent a lot of time on his research and did not pay much attention to Nana, which resulted in the incident that splits Nana into seven girls. He does care a lot about his granddaughter and worries that his experiment might have dire consequences on Nana's well-being. Many of Rokuzo's experiments have ended in failure, including attempts to recombine Nana. One episode reveals that, despite sharing Nana's paternal surname, Rokuzo is actually Mitsuko's father rather than Goro's father. In the anime television series, Rokuzo is voiced by Mugihito in Japanese and Mike Pollock in English.
- Mitsuko Suzuki (鈴木 みつ子, Suzuki Mitsuko) is Nana's mother. She lives in San Francisco for business reasons. She loves Nana dearly and wants her daughter to be as successful as possible. She and Yuichi run into each other in San Francisco without either of them knowing how the other is connected to Nana nor does Nana ever know her mother and Yuichi have met. In the anime television series, Mitsuko is voiced by Sumi Shimamoto in Japanese and Rachael Lillis in English.
- Goro Suzuki (鈴木 五郎, Suzuki Goro) is Nana's father. He also lives in San Francisco. He is a bit of a pushover, but also loves Nana a lot. He is more sentimental than his wife, especially when he notices that both Nana and Grandpa want to remain in their house in Kotomachi, but tends to go along with her wishes. In the episode where Mitsuko wants to move their family, particularly Nana, to San Francisco permanently, it turns out that Rokuzo is actually Mitsuko's father rather than Goro's father. While never confirmed, this implies that Goro took Mitsuko's maternal surname when they got married rather than the other way around. In the anime television series, Goro is voiced by Shinji Ogawa in Japanese and Christopher Kromer in English.
- Miss Melody Honey (メロディー・ハニー) is a girl from San Francisco sent to Nana's house to help Nana improve her English, though she turns out to be a complete slacker who does not really attempt to tutor Nana. It turns out that Mitsuko sent Melody to Japan to confess her feelings to a childhood friend she met named Willie Cambell. During her visit, she discovers the secret of the seven Nanas but promises not to tell anyone. Nana runs into her again in San Francisco, when it turns out she is Yuichi's host during his home stay program. Honey is also a minor character in the anime Sgt. Frog and in Arcade Gamer Fubuki. Voiced by: Honey (Japanese); Naoko Matsui (English)
- Mary Lou is a little girl assigned by Honey, who regularly babysat her, to Yuichi and Nana as part of the home stay program during Nana's trip to San Francisco. Mary tried to use Nana's blue crystal at the Golden Gate Bridge, but she could only manifest an earthquake. In the anime television series, Mary is voiced by Tomoko Kaneda in Japanese and Carolyn Elizabeth in English.
- Billy is a fish mascot. It is usually seen as a fish pillow that Nanakko always carries. Billy also appears as other forms of merchandise, such as the keychain Nana gives Yuichi for Christmas. During Christmas, Nana even dressed up as Billy to avoid being recognized by classmates, Mr. Handa and Mr. Maruoka because it was against school policy for students to take on part-time jobs when they should be studying for entrance exams.
- Mutsumi "DJ 623" Houjou (サブロー / 北城 睦実, Saburo / Hōjō Mutsumi) is the host of the Examinee #623 radio show. He gives advice on various topics, including good luck charms and studying tips. When Nana and Hitomi run into him on the train to school, he was pleased to meet two of his fans. He asks people to send faxes during his radio show any time they want someone to know something. He is upbeat and quite friendly, with noticeably bright blue hair, and even has the nerve to rub Mr. Handa's head and remark it is like a mushroom (a melon in the English dub). He is also a character in the anime Sgt. Frog named as "Saburo". In the anime television series, Mutsumi is voiced by Akira Ishida in Japanese and Sebastian Arcelus in English.

== Episodes ==
No.	Title	Original release date
1	"First Problem! Nana times Nana is NANA?" "Dai-ichi-mon! Nana kakeru nana wa NANA" (第1問!ナナ×7=ナナ?)	January 10, 2002
On Valentine's Day in the town of Kotomachi, junior high school student Nana Suzuki is encouraged by her friend Hitomi Onodera to give a chocolate cake to her crush Yuichi Kamichika, who likes photography. After Nana's bullies Megumi Hayashiba, Erino Kogarashi and Motoko Morinuma ruin the chocolate cake, Nana and Hitomi discover that the microwave at home has gone missing. Believing that her grandfather Rokuzo Suzuki took the microwave, Nana ventures inside Rokuzo's shed full of failed inventions, finding out that the microwave contains a mysterious prism inside. Upon touching the prism, Nana is consequently split into seven versions of herself. Rokuzo later explains that the orb separated into seven crystals representing the seven colors of the rainbow. After her six counterparts bake another chocolate cake and fight over who will deliver it to Yuichi, the original Nana eventually catches up to them by harnessing the power of her blue crystal to gain the ability of flight. During a cherry blossom festival, the seven versions of Nana manage to distract Hayashiba, Kogarashi and Morinuma from approaching Yuichi amidst the crowd before successfully giving their chocolate cake to Yuichi. Upon arriving home, the original Nana realizes that she forgot to sign her name on the gift box, so Yuichi has no clue who gave it to him. This leads the original Nana to strive for enrolling in the same high school as Yuichi.
2	"Chaos! All seven of us go to school?" "daikonran! shichinin sorotte gakkou he?" (大混乱!7人そろって学校へ?)	January 17, 2002
While the others stay back home, Nanappe, the "Hot-Tempered Nana", accompanies Hitomi to school. Hayashiba, Kogarashi and Morinuma report Nana's unusual behavior to the vice principal Mr. Handa, who learns from school guidance counselor Mr. Maruoka that Nana has impeccable conduct over the past week, despite the fact that he was describing Nana's individual personalities as a whole. Rokuzo discovers that the seven crystals are only attuned to the seven versions of Nana. The next day, the original Nana accompanies Hitomi to school. However, her six counterparts have inadvertently made her a laughingstock by her peers. In order to uphold their respective reputations, the six counterparts sew their own matching school uniforms and compete with being the first to touch Yuichi's hand while walking to the reference room. The original Nana arrives at school after freeing herself from being tied up in a mattress, witnessing all the shenanigans that her six counterparts are pulling. In the reference room, Nanarin, the "Crybaby Nana", is frightened when she falls victim to a prank with various scale models. The original Nana swoops in and strokes Nanarin's head to calm her down. Yuichi finally finds the reference room, where the original Nana is the first to touch Yuichi's hand by accident while retrieving a box of slides for the projector, granting her the right to attend school on her own. However, Rokuzo later warns Hitomi that the seven versions of Nana must recombine within a year before disappearing from existence.
3	"Do seven Nanas make one Nana?" "Shichinin minna de hitori no NANA?" (七人みんなで一人のナナ?)	January 24, 2002
During Golden Week, Hitomi reminds Nana of how crucial the upcoming final exams will be. Upon returning home, Nana's six counterparts wish to go to the flea market, but Nana quickly dismisses them. Just then, Mayor pays a visit to Rokuzo, playing a game of shogi after dropping off a box of costumes from the children's show "Nana Rangers". Nana's six counterparts decide to go to the flea market while wearing these costumes. After failing to strike a pose for Yuichi's camera, they learn from Hayashiba, Kogarashi and Morinuma that the final exams are reassignment tests, leading to them finding out that the original Nana is studying for the final exams at Hitomi's house. When the original Nana returns home, she realizes that her six counterparts have infiltrated the school building to steal the test questions from the principal's office, only for them to get caught by Handa. While getting roped into a performance with Hayashiba, Kogarashi and Morinuma dressed as roaches, the original Nana uses her blue crystal to enhance her costume, managing to break into the principal's office and rescue her six counterparts. The seven versions of Nana manage to escape from Maruoka and hide in the cherry blossom, where the original Nana learns that her six counterparts were instead trying to issue a petition against the reassignment tests. Yuichi spots the seven versions of Nana and decides to take their picture in front of the cherry blossom.
4	"The birth of the exam hell squadron Nana rangers?" "Tanjou! Juuken sentai NANA RENJAA?" (誕生!受験戦隊ナナレンジャー?)	January 31, 2002
After much consideration, Hitomi nicknames each of Nana's six counterparts before taking her leave. Nana's six counterparts formulate a plan for Nana to ace the upcoming reassignment test. On the first night, Nana pulls an all-nighter, but her six counterparts end up falling asleep. Nana does not make any progress with Nanacchi, the "Smiling Nana", on the second night; Nanarin on the third night; Nanakko, the "Easygoing Nana", on the fourth night; or Nanasama, the "Brainy Nana" on the fifth night. While taking a trip to the convenience store where Mayor works, Nana runs into Hayashiba, Kogarashi and Morinuma on the way there. Nana encounters a scooter gang causing a racket in the streets. On the sixth night, Nanapon, the "Ghostly Nana", bookmarks all the study material for Nana to review in the subjects of English, math and Japanese. After witnessing when the scooter gang traps Mayor inside the convenience store, Nana's six counterparts retreat back home and put on their costumes. Nanappe distracts the scooter gang long enough for Nana to put on her costume, allowing the seven versions of Nana to scare off the scooter gang and free Mayor from being trapped inside the convenience store just as morning approaches. At school, Nana manages to ace the reassignment tests, thanks to all the unorthodox studying methods that her six counterparts implemented. Nana transfers to the fast-track class with Hitomi and Yuichi, while Hayashiba, Kogarashi and Morinuma are transferred to the remedial class.
5	"Decision time! Yuichi's first-choice High School?" "Kettei! Kamichika-kun no Shibōkō" (決定!神近君の志望校?)	February 7, 2002
Hitomi is shocked when Nana has no idea which high school Yuichi plans to enroll in. Determined to find out the answer, Nana attempts to sneak a peak at Yuichi's high school survey in the faculty room, but her efforts are in vain when Handa and Maruoka stand in her way. Nana remains determined to know even though Hitomi believes that Yuichi's choice should be personal and private. After Nanapon forgets to clear the dining table for lunch, she uses her purple crystal to hypnotize on Nanappe, Nanakko, Nanacchi, Nanarin and Nanasama into doing the household chores. When Nana returns home, Nanapon accidentally hypnotizes herself and carries out Nana's wish to see Yuichi's high school survey. Things escalate when Nanapon hypnotizes the townspeople, including Hayashiba, Kogarashi and Morinuma. Handa and Maruoka are scared out of their wits when they are chased to the school rooftop. Nana is in utter disbelief when more townspeople in the shopping district have also been hypnotized. When Nana spots Nanapon preparing to hypnotize Hitomi and Yuichi at a shrine, Yuichi accidentally sets off a camera flash, which snaps Nanapon out of her trance. Borrowing Yuichi's camera, Nana brings her six counterparts high above the town as they emit a radiant light that returns the townspeople back to normal. In the aftermath, Nana, Nanapon and Hitomi find out that Yuichi wrote down which high school he has chosen on a wooden plaque in the shrine.
6	"Examinee n° 623! Late-night radio commotion?" "Juken Bangō 623! Shinya Radio de Ōsōdō?" (受験番号623!深夜ラジオで大騒動?)	February 14, 2002
After Nana fails a pop quiz out of embarrassment, Nanasama dials the radio to a talk show hosted by Mutsumi Houjou, who gives advice in the form of haiku. Nana starts daydreaming at school when Yuichi may have anonymously faxed a message for her to do well in the fast-track class, leading Handa to give Nana a stack of homework to complete before the next day. When Nana faxes a reply to Yuichi's message, Nanasama destroys the radio out of anger, cutting the message short. Using Rokuzo's radio projector screen invention, Nanappe, Nanakko, Nanacchi, Nanarin and Nanapon alert Nanasama that Nana is being framed for faxing messages about calling Handa a "pig-nosed melonhead". Unbeknownst to the seven versions of Nana, the culprits behind this prank are Hayashiba, Kogarashi and Morinuma. After Handa and Maruoka flood the fax machine, Mutsumi gives his listeners an algebra equation to solve and the chance to be heard over the phone. Handa and Maruoka are disconnected from calling when they request the immediately cancellation of the radio talk show. As a backup plan, Mutsumi gives his listeners an advanced algebra equation to solve and the chance to be heard in-person. Nana manages to solve it on her own, and Nanasama carries Nana in her bedroom desk and crashes into the radio station. While on the air, Nana gives a compelling speech to encourage every student to study hard, inspiring Mutsumi to host a radio talk show for everyone.
7	"Midnight snack munchies! A cook-off to help us pass our exams?" "Yahoku Mogmogu! Ryōri Shōbu mo Juken no Tame ni?" (夜食モグモグ!料理勝負も受験のために?)	February 21, 2002
When Nana gets sick, Nanacchi offers to attend school and partner with Hitomi during cooking class. Hayashiba, Kogarashi and Morinuma end up challenging Nanacchi and Hitomi to a cook-off on the following week. As Nana gets the mumps, Nanappe, Nanakko, Nanarin, Nanasama and Nanapon confront Nanacchi about the cook-off. For five nights, Nanacchi competes with the other girls one at a time to see which of their dishes Nana would enjoy more for a midnight snack. Nana tells Nanacchi that Japanese cooking requires sugar, salt, sour vinegar, soy sauce and salty bean paste in that order. Nanacchi tries to balance nutrition, seasoning and presentation in her other dishes, but Nana always opts for the dish that the other girls prepared each time. On the night before the cook-off, Nana finally chooses Nanacchi's dish. In the morning, as the other girls fly out to buy various ingredients, Nanacchi is caught off guard when Nana is restored back to full health, though Nana has gained weight from eating all the midnight snacks. As the other girls run late before the cook-off starts, Nanacchi has to work with eggs and rice that Hitomi brought with her. Handa and Maruoka are in agreement when Yuichi enjoys the rice balls and fried eggs prepared by Nanacchi and Hitomi. After being disqualified for cheating during the cook-off, Hayashiba, Kogarashi and Morinuma are forced to carry Nanacchi on their shoulders all the way home to hold up their end of the bargain.
8	"Confess your love in English! KO the American tutor?" "Eigo de Kokugaku! Kaiteikyōshi o Yattsukero?" (英語で告白!家庭教師をやっつけろ?)	February 28, 2002
Nana receives a letter from her mother Mitsuko Suzuki, who works overseas in San Francisco. Moreover, Mitsuko sends over Melody Honey as an English tutor for Nana, forcing Rokuzo to hide Nana's six counterparts as Melody explores Nana's home. Melody seems to be distracted, preferring to go sightseeing with Rokuzo instead. Nanappe attempts to find out Melody's true motive for visiting Kotomachi. After Melody harshly tells Nanappe that her love life should not depend on the high school entrance exams, Nanappe's short temper leads to her revealing that there are seven of them. Melody promises to keep this a secret on the condition that Nanappe masters her English. Nanappe distributes flyers to find a new English tutor with the perk of watching maiko dancers perform, causing a crowd of men to show up at Nana's home. After discovering that Melody has unrequited love for her childhood friend Willie Cambell, Nanappe calls Mitsuko and learns that Melody wanted to confess her feeling to Willie. The next day, the seven Nanas bring Melody to the cherry blossom so Nanappe's English can be evaluated. The remaining Nanas collectively transmit Nanappe's English composition, asking Willie to meet Melody at the cherry blossom, revealing she was too self-conscious about her thick Osaka accent to confess her love. After Willie arrives and confesses he also has feelings for Melody, the seven versions of Nana carry Melody and Willie into the sunset towards the airport.
9	"Sweet temptation! Love, secrets and crib notes?" "Amai Yūwaku! Koi to Himitsu to Kanningu?" (甘い誘惑!恋と秘密とカンニング?)	March 7, 2002
Running late for school after stopping a runaway tram, Nanarin subs in for Nana, who stayed home from a fever. Much to Nanacchi's dismay, Handa and Maruoka issue a pop quiz to the fast-track class. Nanarin notices that her classmate Akane Sugiyama used a cheat sheet, but Akane was aware that Nanarin hid her yellow-green costume in the bushes before coming to class. The next day, Nana learns from Hitomi about the pop quiz, which Nanarin and Akane scored the lowest on. Handa and Maruoka threatens to demote Nana and Akane to the regular class, but Yuichi speaks up against this course of action. Instead, Handa and Marouka announce that they will remove the lowest scorer of the next pop quiz from the fast-track class. Nana eventually finds out that Akane knows about Nanarin and her costume. Later on, Nanarin catches Akane trying to mail a love letter to Yuichi. At the cherry blossom, Akane urges Nanarin not to tell anyone that she studied very hard to become closer to Yuichi in the fast-track class. Nanarin later appears outside Akane's bedroom window, urging Akane not to use a cheat sheet anymore. On the following day, Handa and Maruoka issue the next pop quiz, and they catch Akane supposedly using a cheat sheet, urging Nanarin to cheer from the sidelines as a distraction. It is revealed that Akane's cheat sheet was actually written words of affirmation. When Akane prepares to transfer to another school, Nanarin personally wishes her good luck.
10	"The dreaded F! Final exams are a must-win battle?" "Kyōfu no Akaten! Kimatsu Tetsuto o Toppa Seyo?" (恐怖の赤点!期末テストを突破せよ?)	March 14, 2002
With summer vacation approaching, Handa and Maruoka informs the fast-track class that anyone who fails the final exams will be forced to go to summer school. Nana follows a rigorous study schedule, but her six counterparts have trouble handling the household chores. After a week has gone by, Nanakko becomes concerned over Nana's well-being. As Nana and Hitomi walk to school one day, Hayashiba, Kogarashi and Morinuma tease Nana for the possibility of failing her final exams, while Yuichi passes by as he admits that he reviews his study materials everyday instead of cramming overnight. As a bidding strategy to prevent Nana from being deprived of sleep, Nanakko purposely sets the alarm clock at a later time and switches the pillow to a fish mascot named Billy with a tape recorder inside. After being scolded by the other girls, Nanakko is told by Rokuzo that each of the seven versions of Nana has a unique talent to offer. During class, Nana has a dream of acing her first final exam, though she flunks it in reality. A depressed Nana comes home, only to realize that Nanakko was just looking out for her all along. As Nanakko goes missing, Nana, Nanappe, Nanacchi, Nanarin, Nanasama and Nanapon search all over town and find Nanakko outside Yuichi's house. Thanks to Nanakko, a well-rested Nana aces her second final exam, only having to spend half of summer vacation at summer school with Hayashiba, Kogarashi and Morinuma.
11	"Have your cake and eat it too?" "Nito Ou mono wa Nito o E yo?" (二兎追うものは二兎を得よ?)	March 21, 2002
Nana is invited by Hitomi to attend the annual hamo eel party in the evening at her family restaurant, though Nana refrains from informing her six counterparts, who rather maintain a sedentary lifestyle throughout the day. On the way to summer school, Nana bumps into Yuichi, who plans to develop his photos in the school's darkroom. Yuichi notes that he got into photography through a friend who loves to sketch. Nana is taken aback when Yuichi invites her to attend the bonfire festival with him in the evening, though he apologizes for being too forward. After class, Nana decides to attend the bonfire festival before the hamo eel party. Nana's six counterparts eventually find out about the hamo eel party from Hitomi over the phone and about the bonfire festival when a yukata is missing from the wardrobe. Unable to find Yuichi at the bonfire festival, the seven versions of Nana stop by Hitomi's family restaurant to have hamo eel. Finally locating Yuichi from afar, the seven versions of Nana push through the crowd, and Nana briefly encounters a girl with a sketchbook. Before the bonfire festival ends, Nana's six counterparts dress in their costumes to ignite a second bonfire as a distraction, while Nana personally apologizes to Yuichi for not responding to his invitation. Yuichi offers to take a photo of Nana in front of the bonfires, while Nana is ultimately photobombed by her six counterparts.
12	"Hot summer study retreat! Heartstopping test of courage and love?" "Manatsu no Shūchū Gasshuku! Dokidoki Koi no Kan Tameshi?" (真夏の集中合宿!ドキドキ恋の肝試し?)	March 28, 2002
Nana attends a weeklong summer study retreat at a shrine for the fast-track class, while Hayashiba, Kogarashi and Morinuma tag along. Handa and Maruoka teach the method of zazen meditation to foster concentration, though Nana proves to have a lack thereof. Rokuzo brings Nana's six counterparts in a recreational vehicle borrowed from Mayor to a beach house nearby. At night, Hayashiba tells a ghost story to the female students about a girl ghost who lost her concentration on her entrance exam due to her forbidden and unrequited love with a teacher and who brings a curse to a temple across the bridge. Handa and Maruoka issue a test of courage for the fast-track class, where Nana is luckily paired Yuichi. After overhearing that Hayashiba, Kogarashi and Morinuma are working in cahoots with Handa and Maruoka, Nana's six counterparts pull pranks on the bridge to scare Hayashiba, Kogarashi and Morinuma witless. Nana and Yuichi arrive at the temple after he tells her that fostering concentration requires relaxation and passion. Going inside alone, Nana finds her six counterparts trembling with fear. Nana faints from seeing the girl ghost after completing a worksheet by herself. Upon awakening, Nana is told by Handa and Maruoka that she had a perfect score on her worksheet after it is explained that the girl ghost died from tuberculosis and brings a blessing to the temple. Nana reflects on her time at the summer study retreat on her bus ride home.
13	"Love & English conversation! A mid-air rendez-vous with Yuichi?" "Koisuru Eikawa! Kamichika-kun to Osota no Ue de Randebū?" (恋する英会話!神近君とお空の上でランデブー?)	April 4, 2002
The seven Nanas watch as Yuichi boards an outbound flight to San Francisco as part of a student exchange program, accompanied by Handa and Maruoka. Nana's six counterparts yearn to visit Yuichi in San Francisco, but Nana quickly dismisses the idea. In order to cheer up her six counterparts, Nana buys a flight simulation video game for them. However, Nana becomes interested in playing it when one of the destinations happen to be San Francisco, distracting her from studying for her English conversation test. Meanwhile, Yuichi's flight gets caught in a thunderstorm. When Nana hears about it on Mutsumi's radio show, she rallies her six counterparts together to catch up to the airplane using the radars activated on their costumes' helmets. Upon entering the airplane, the seven Nanas learn from Yuichi that the other passengers and flight crew have food poisoning from the in-flight meal. After running into some turbulence, Yuichi formulates a plan with the seven Nanas to fix the various damages and safely land the airplane. Nana and Yuichi contact ground control, who only speak English, which neither of them can understand. At the last second, Nana realises they are being told to engage the landing gear, causing the airplane to undergo a ground loop until coming to a screeching halt. Nana rushes back home, but the time zone difference between Japan and the United States causes her to miss the English conversation test.
14	"Overseas study program! Chaos in San Francisco?" "Hōmusutei de Juken Benkyō! Sanfuranshishuko wa Ōsawagi?" (ホームステイで受験勉強!サンフランシスコは大騒ぎ?)	April 11, 2002
Suspecting that her six counterparts went to visit Mitsuko in San Francisco, Nana runs into Melody on the way there. Since Yuichi is staying with Melody for the student exchange program, Melody has the bright idea for Nana and Yuichi to babysit a little girl named Mary Lou while touring the city. Meanwhile, Nana's six counterparts get lost in different place when they go sightseeing. Yuichi admits to Nana that he feels like the student exchange program has been a huge waste of time. At Fisherman's Wharf, Mary hides behind a barrel, causing Nana to run off in search for her, though Nanapon appears and finds Mary before reuniting with Yuichi. After contacting Nana to meet up at the Golden Gate Bridge, Melody catches Nanapon in the act, though Nanakko takes her place. At a park, Mary is scared off upon seeing Nanappe, Nanacchi, Nanarin and Nanasama nearby. After finding Mary at the Golden Gate Bridge, Yuichi encounters Mitsuko, who encourages him to have fun, while Melody gathers Nana's six counterparts. Mary dons Nana's blue costume left behind at Melody's house, claiming Nana to be an alien when she shortly arrives. However, Mary faints after manifesting an earthquake that causes the Golden Gate Bridge to start collapsing. The seven versions of Nana don their costumes and save the Golden Gate Bridge, forming a heart in the middle. Yuichi tells Nana that he has decided to take Mitsuko's advice.
15	"To each her own entrance exam! Who will catch the future?" "Sorezore no Juken! Mirai wa Ga ga Te ka Dare no Te ni?" (それぞれの受験!未来は我が手か誰の手に?)	April 18, 2002
With summer vacation coming to a close, Nana starts her second semester at school. Nana feels ashamed upon admitting to Yuichi that she wants to take the entrance exams for fun. As Nana learns that Hitomi wants to study economics and business in order to open up her own restaurant someday, they witness Hayashiba running away from Kogarashi and Morinuma. Nanappe later finds out from Kogarashi and Morinuma that Hayashiba is training to become a maiko dancer, while Nana remains indifferent about this. Despite their failed attempt at convincing Handa and Maruoka to reverse Hayashiba's decision, Kogarashi and Morinuma eventually turn to Nanapon, Nanarin and Nanakko for help. In the streets, Hayashiba tells Nana that she made a promise to become a maiko dancer. On a Sunday morning before the maiko test, Nanapon, Nanarin and Nanakko fail to distract Hayashiba, while Nanappe, Nanacchi and Nanasama end up escalating the situation. At the maiko school, Nana meets an old woman, who explains that Hayashiba promised her late grandfather to become a maiko dancer. Nana then rushes to rescue Hayashiba just in time from being tossed around by Nana's six counterparts. Hayashiba manages to pass the maiko test and keep her promise to her late grandfather. The next day, Hayashiba, Kogarashi and Morinuma go back to teasing Nana.
16	"Cultural festival heartbreak! A 4-Handkerchief tearjerker?" "Koi Chiru Bunkamatsuri! Namida mo Kareru Daibutai?" (恋散る文化祭!涙も枯れる大舞台?)	April 25, 2002
Handa and Maruoka announce that the fast-track class will not participate in the cultural festival, though Nana volunteers alongside Yuichi to be a part of the planning committee. With Hayashiba, Kogarashi and Morinuma acting as chairpersons for the planning committee, they pressure her to find a way and convince the fast-track class to participate in the cultural festival. Yuichi likes Nana's idea of having a "Nana Rangers" show in the cultural festival, though he would not be helpful because he is already assigned as an attendant. Nana hands out her proposal to the fast-track class, but only Hitomi shows interest in making preparations in the school auditorium. On the day of the cultural festival, Nana meets Yuichi's childhood friend Tsukie Kayano at the school entrance. In the school auditorium, the seven versions of Nana put on a performance with Hitomi and Rokuzo. In the middle of the show, Nana's six counterparts bring Kayano onstage and tosses her around to the point of irritation. Kayano blatantly undermines the performance, prompting Kogarashi to step up and defend Nana for working hard to produce the show with Hayashiba and Morinuma in full support. When Kayano leaves the stage, Nana runs to the school courtyard, where Yuichi discovers that his feelings for Kayano are unrequited. Upon witnessing this interaction, the seven versions of Nana feel heartbroken after realizing that Yuichi wanted to become closer to Kayano.
17	"The day Nana disappeared... and reappeared?" "Nana ga Kieru Hi, Deketeru-bi?" (ナナが消える日、出てくる日?)	May 2, 2002
Nana has been absent from school and cooped up in her bedroom for three consecutive days as she questions why she ever fell in love with Yuichi. Hitomi encounters Yuichi outside Nana's home, suggesting to him that it is a bad time to see Nana. After discovering that the seven crystals are starting to crack, Hitomi and Rokuzo realize that Nana's six counterparts begin to vanish one at time, starting with Nanacchi and Nanakko. Hayashiba, Kogarashi and Morinuma come by the next day to retrieve Nana from her bedroom to attend a volunteer work class, surprised to see Hitomi there. As Nana sees Yuichi again, both Nanarin and Nanasama disappear in the bedroom. Upon hearing that Morinuma appreciates doing volunteer work as a thankless deed, Nana walks away without anyone looking, having lost sight of why she ever fell in love with Yuichi. Although Hitomi and Rokuzo panic over Nana's disappearance, Morinuma finds Nana and carries her to the cherry blossom at the top of the stairway. After Morinuma explains that there does not need to be a reason to appreciate something, this reinvigorates Nana's spirit and restores the seven crystals, which revives Nana's six counterparts. While Morinuma faints from supposed hallucination, Hitomi and Rokuzo are overjoyed to see the seven versions of Nana in front of them.
18	"Confession in the snow? Happy Christmas from us all!" "Yukifuru Kokuhaku? Nana to Minna no Happy X'mas!" (雪降る告白?ナナとみんなのHappy X'mas!)	May 9, 2002
With Christmas just around the corner, Nana tells her six counterparts that examinees are not allowed to take up part-time jobs because it will affect their transcript. As Nana leaves to go out with Hitomi, Nana's six counterparts seize the opportunity to handle the task of decorating the Kotozaka Tower with Christmas lights for Mayor, asking him for a payment in advance to buy gifts. After Hitomi explains that she is into the perfect gentleman, Nana gets roped into taking up a part-time job outside a bakery, where she sell cakes with free keychains while dressed in a Billy costume. Just as Hayashiba, Kogarashi and Morinuma catch Nana working, Kayano arrives to pick up her reserved cake, though Nana forgets to give Kayano a free keychain. At the cherry blossom, Nana's six counterparts spot Yuichi waiting to meet up with Kayano. Just as Hayashiba, Kogarashi and Morinuma ditch minding the shop, Hitomi arrives and disguises herself by removing her glasses when Marouka approaches, but she bashfully runs off when he presents himself as the perfect gentleman. Having eavesdropped on Yuichi and Kayano by the cherry blossom before Kayano walks away, Yuichi finds Nana dressed in the Billy costume pretending to be a stranger. Nana tells Yuichi not to give up hope after he explains his backstory for wanting to attend the same high school as Kayano. As Nana gives Yuichi the keychain, he gives her a fancy mechanical pencil in exchange.
19	"New Year's Eve with the whole family! Panic! Mom and Dad return!" "Kazoku Sorotte Ōmisoka! Papa·Mama Kikoku de Dai Pinchi?" (家族そろって大みそか!パパ·ママ帰国で大ピンチ?)	May 16, 2002
While doing household chores, Nana learns that her six counterparts were distracted by Nana's childhood photo album. Mitsuko and Nana's father Goro Suzuki pay an unexpected visit to the house, forcing Nana's six counterparts to hide. Mitsuko eventually tells Rokuzo that Nana should attend school in San Francisco. Mayor later swings by and offers to designate the house as a historic landmark if Rokuzo agrees to sell it. Much to Nana's dismay, Rokuzo is coerced to give into the offer. The seven versions of Nana hatch a plan to prove that they are collectively a mature person. One by one, they tell Mitsuko and Goro what they have learned so far by staying in Japan, but Mitsuko still has made up her mind. The next day, Nana and Rokuzo head to the airport with Mitsuko and Goro. After they are stuck in a traffic jam, Nana's six counterparts use a transmitter in the form of a doll to help Nana guide Rokuzo out of crowded roads by taking an unorthodox route. They pass by memorable places from Nana's childhood, including the elementary school, the shrine and the cherry blossom. Mitsuko ultimately decides to let Nana stay in Japan. On their flight back to San Francisco, Goro tells Mitsuko that Nana really has matured, and they must give her time until she is ready to explore the world.
20	"Passing grade guaranteed! Charms gone awry?" "Zettai Gōkaku Omajinai de Dai Meisō" (絶対合格!おまじないで大迷走?)	May 23, 2002
When Nana expresses worry to Hitomi about the upcoming English test, Hayashiba, Kogarashi and Morinuma convince Nana that a good luck charm in the form of a cherry blossom keychain vended at a shrine will automatically warrant a high score on any test. Unfortunately, all of the cherry blossom keychains were sold out by the time Nana got there. While discussing this with her six counterparts, Nana takes an idea from Nanapon to use banana peels as good luck charms. After Nana gets a passing grade on her English test, her six counterparts scour for all sorts of good luck charms, unaware that they are being followed by a little boy named Masaru. Nana also practices various superstitions, much to Hitomi's concern. The seven versions eat fried bread for dinner, having to throw out the ramen, much to Rokuzo's chagrin. As Nana tries to follow advice given by Mutsumi's late night radio show, the seven versions of Nana notice that they heard bells worn by Masaru, who thwarted Nana's efforts three different times. When Rokuzo says that grabbing a solely surviving leaf on a ginkgo tree will bring good luck, Nana is thwarted again by Masaru, but the leaf consequently drops into the river. After Masaru explains that he also wants to ace his tests, Nana and Masaru fetch two leaves from another ginkgo tree. Nana carries a pouch sewn by her six counterparts containing a leaf inside as her good luck charm.
21	"The missing pencil! There are 8 Nanas?" "Kieta Shāpen! Odoroki Mono no Ki Hachi Hitome no Nana?" (消えたシャーペン!驚き桃の木8人目のナナ?)	May 30, 2002
Nana is surprised that she is among the top ten scorers of the entire grade from her practice test. After arriving home, Nana panics over misplacing her mechanical pencil on her bedroom desk. Nana's six counterparts try to accuse each other of being the culprit, and Nana explains the situation to Rokuzo during dinnertime. While Nana's six counterparts sleep in separate parts of the house, Nana senses an eerie presence leaving her bedroom. The next day at school, Nana panics over misplacing her homework, believing that one of her six counterparts was behind this. Nana seemingly has a dream that an evil clone took her place in the fast-track class, having both the mechanical pencil and the homework. Rokuzo becomes concerned when the prism starts emitting a black light. Nana realizes something is wrong when Hayashiba, Kogarashi and Morinuma no longer becomes her pep squad, Hitomi does not walk her to school and even Handa and Maruoka shows her a failing grade on her actual test. In the storage room, Nana encounters Jamanana, the "Eighth Nana", who escapes after saying that she is no longer ignored. When Rokuzo falls ill, Nana rushes home, where Nana's six counterparts take good care of him. Nana takes the makeup test the following day, returning home in good spirits, thanks to her good luck charm. With Rokuzo feeling better, he tells Jamanana to come out of hiding, and Jamanana drops the mechanical pencil down the stairway.
22	"Showdown! Nana and Yuichi! Interview for early acceptance?" "Taiketsu! Nana to Kamichika-kun! Mensetsu Shiken de Suisen Gōkaku?" (対決!ナナと神近君!面接試験で推薦合格?)	June 6, 2002
Handa and Maruoka inform Nana and Yuichi that only one of them can qualify for early acceptance into the high school division of Yasaka Oogi, which would pit them as academic rivals. With the interviews in three days, Nana is interrupted by Jamanana during a practice session with Nana's six original counterparts. Hitomi notices that Jamanana tried to pose as Nana when they run into Hayashiba, Kogarashi and Morinuma showing their full support again. Jamanana intends to switch places with Nana for the upcoming interview. Handa and Maruoka help prepare Nana and Yuichi to answer the most difficult question of the interview. On the day of the interview, Nana takes a train and arrives at Yasaka Oogi on time, but Yuichi gets lost while riding his bike because of Jamanana. When Nana's six original counterparts spot Yuichi, they are thwarted by Jamanana, who dons a cooler costume just from activating her black crystal. As Yuichi head towards Yasaka Oogi, Jamanana admits that she needed to stall him long enough for Nana to answer the most difficult question, her reason for applying to Yasaka Oogi. After Nana admits her reason was because of Yuichi, he finally arrives afterwards but with a look of disdain. Handa and Maruoka later congratulate Nana on her early acceptance to Yasaka Oogi. Nana recalls that Yuichi never admitted his reason was because of Kayano, while Jamanana watches Kayano studying in her bedroom from afar.
23	"Early acceptance retracted! My love life and my exams are out of control?" "Suisen Torikeshi!! Watashi no Koi to Jukan wa Dō naru no?" (推薦取り消し!!私の恋と受験はどうなるの?)	June 13, 2002
Nana and Hitomi coincidentally meet Mutsumi by train on the way to school. The fast-track class secretly express jealous for Nana's early acceptance into Yasaka Oogi. Nana is called into the principal's office, deducing that Jamanana framed her for burning Kayano's right hand with hot tea. As a result, Nana's early acceptance into Yasaka Oogi has been retracted. However, Handa knows without a doubt that Nana would never do anything to jeopardize her academic career. Later at the school entrance, Yuichi berates Nana for hurting Kayano, but Hitomi slaps Yuichi to his senses. A conversation between the junior high school principal and the high school headmistress reveals that Nana is still given the opportunity take the entrance exams. Nana goes on bedrest after passing out from stress. At night, Jamanana tries to convince Nana to give up and let go. On Mutsumi's late night radio show, Mutsumi reads aloud a fax sent from Hitomi telling Nana not to give up or let go. Nana's classmates and even Handa also send faxes of encouragement, causing Jamanana to vanish in anguish. Having temporarily removed her glasses, Hitomi serves Handa and Maruoka at her family restaurant, though they do not recognize her as Hitomi.
24	"The day before the exam!! The last battle, Nana vs Nana?" "Juken Zenjitsu!! Saigo no Taiketsu Nana VS Nana?" (受験前日!!最後の対決 ナナVSナナ?)	June 20, 2002
Rokuzo is distracted from conducting an experiment on the microwave when Nanappe, Nanakko, Nanacchi, Nanarin, Nanasama and Nanapon have a karate session outside the shed, seeing as Jamanana is much more powerful than the other six combined. Nana receives her exam card with the number 623 as a sign of hope. Yuichi apologizes to Nana for his behavior due to being worried about Kayano. Nana borrows her blue crystal before Rokuzo could make final adjustments to the microwave. Yuichi and Kayano wait at the cherry blossom, where Nana dons her costume and encourages Kayano to take the entrance exams. However, the moment is almost ruined when Hayashiba, Kogarashi and Morinuma pass by with pessimistic tendencies. Feeling empathy, Kayano walks to Nana's house, unknowingly greeted by Jamanana. Nana's six original counterparts don their costumes and secretly meet up with Yuichi after learning that Kayano has gone missing. Jamanana brings Kayano to the Azumasa Historical Village, which depicts the Edo period, though Kayano is unsettled when Jamanana hid her exam card. Nana's six original counterparts return home to celebrate Nana as she prepares for her entrance exams, while Rokuzo announces that he has finally fixed the microwave. Rokuzo gives the crystals to Nana's six original counterparts as they prepare for a final showdown against Jamanana, and Nana realizes this upon finding Kayano's exam card in a storage box. Being distracted by Nana's six original counterparts, Jamanana manifests a blizzard from being overwhelmed with emotions when Yuichi manages to rescue Kayano.
25	"Acceptance announcement! Flowers blossom on the hill of hearts?" "Gōkakuhahhyo!! Kokoro no Oka ni Hana no Saku?" (合格発表!!心の丘に花の咲く?)	June 27, 2002
Donning her costume and rushing over to the Azumasa Historical Village as the blizzard worsens, Nana timely arrives to prevent Jamanana from messing with Yuichi, who is advised to take Kayano and run away. Rokuzo invites Yuichi inside the house and puts Kayano on bedrest, and they eventually realize that Nana loves Yuichi. During their epic battle, Jamanana tells Nana that Kayano burned her own right hand. Kayano leaves Yuichi with pondering about how Nana feels. After taking Nana's blue crystal, Jamanana does the same to Nana's six original counterparts. Embracing Jamanana as the one true self who was hidden, Nana encourages her to be the one to take the entrance exams and confess her feelings to Yuichi. However, Jamanana chooses to give up the crystals and vows to be honest before vanishing. With the crystals now fully combined as the prism, Nana tearfully says farewell to her six other counterparts as they finally merge into one being again, consequently wilting the cherry blossom. Nana attends her junior high school graduation, where Hayashiba, Kogarashi and Morinuma start their successful careers. When high school begins in the spring, Nana and Hitomi are surprised that Yuichi enrolled with them. At the wilted cherry blossom, a moment between Nana and Yuichi is ruined when Nana's six original counterparts appear and reveal that the prism never merged them into one being after all. As the cherry blossom blooms once again, the entire town is awestruck when they see all seven versions of Nana.
OVA	"It's New Year's! 7x7=49 Nanas?" "Oshōgatsuda yo! Nana Kakeru Nana wa Yonjū-kyū Nana?" (お正月だよ! 7×7=49人のナナ?)	October 2, 2002 (DVD Volume 7)
This episode takes place after Episode 19. On New Year's Day, Nana decides to put her studying aside and laze around all day until Rokuzo challenges her to a game of hanafuda in exchange for an allowance if she wins. After Nana loses, Rokuzo defeats Nana's six original counterparts except Nanarin, who then challenges Rokuzo to a game of chō-han. Nanarin wins back the allowance, thanks to a little help from Nanapon. The seven versions of Nana disappointingly receive 1,000 yen each. Nana hangs out with Hitomi at the shrine and spots Nana's six other counterparts scattered around. As they misplace their money, the seven versions of Nana assume that it was stolen by Hayashiba, Kogarashi and Morinuma. Fortunately, Nanapon saved her money, and Nanasama gets the bright idea of using the microwave to multiply the money seven times, but the seven versions of Nana multiply seven times instead. Kayano stands in the way of the 49 clones of Nana, who raid an inn to confront Hayashiba, Kogarashi and Morinuma. In retaliation, the clones multiply themselves exponentially, though it turns out to be just a lucid dream. Nana decides to hold onto her allowance and resume her studies, unaware it was Jamanana who stole the remaining money from Nana's six original counterparts.

== Music ==
Opening Theme

- "Success, Success" by nanaxnana (Nana Mizuki, Sumomo Momomori, Mai Asagi, Yukari Fukui)

Ending Theme

- "Birdie, Birdie" by Nana Mizuki

== In other media ==
Sgt. Frog

Sgt. Frog's manga artist, Mine Yoshizaki, created the character concept designs for Seven of Seven. As such, various crossovers exist between the series. The character of Mutsumi Hojo, who appears as "Examinee 623" and the host of his own radio program in Seven of Seven, is a major character in Sgt. Frog. Melody Honey, a minor character in Sgt. Frog, appears and even receives a backstory. Additionally, the recurring ghost character in Sgt. Frog very closely resembles the design of the ghost that appeared in the temple in episode 12 of Seven of Seven.

In addition, episode 89 of Sgt. Frog features a plot that splits Corporal Giroro into seven personalities, most of whom resemble Nana's split personalities. A segment of the episode featuring Mutsumi takes place at the cherry tree seen frequently in Seven of Seven. In Volume 18 of the manga, a ninja named Nana is introduced. She looks identical to Nana from Seven of Seven. She also had six copies, each one with a personality matching the various Nanas from Seven of Seven.
