= Saga University =

Higher education institution in Saga Prefecture, Japan

Coordinates: 33°14′32″N 130°17′28″E

- 佐賀大学
- Motto: Aim at the leap of the further education and research.
- Type: Public (National)
- Established: 1920; 106 years ago
- Endowment: N/A
- President: Kohji Miyazaki
- Location: Saga, Saga Prefecture, Japan
- Website: www.saga-u.ac.jp

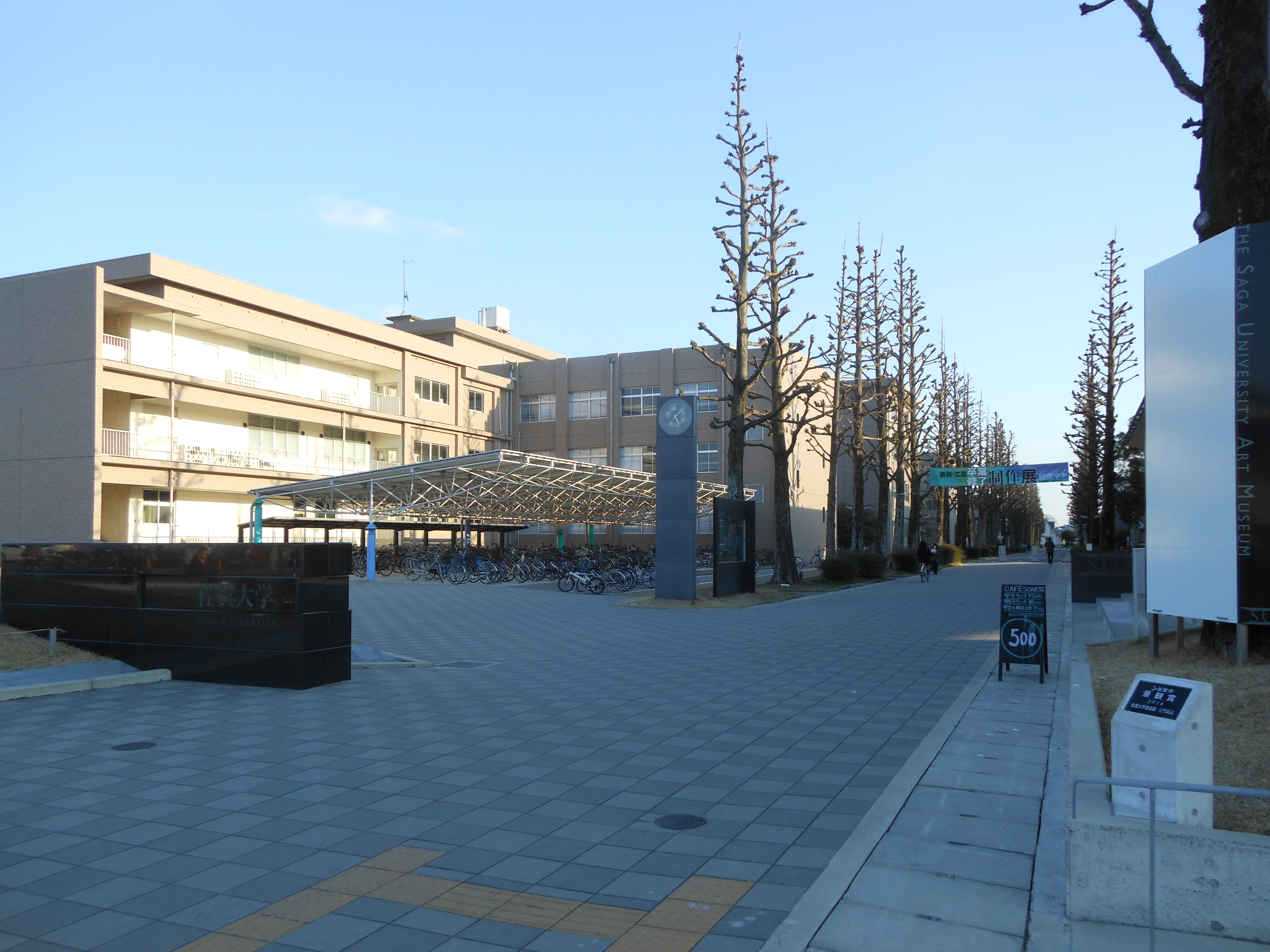
Saga University Honjō Campus

Saga University (佐賀大学, Saga daigaku); abbreviated as Sagadai (佐賀大, Sagadai) or Sadai (佐大, Sadai), is a national university in Saga, Saga Prefecture, Japan. The university has five faculties with around 7,000 students. Its two campuses are in Honjo (本庄) and Nabeshima (鍋島).

== History ==
The history of Saga University is complicated. The oldest Saga teacher's school was demoted to a prefectural school by the law of teacher's schools.

Saga High School (佐賀高等學校, Saga koutou gakkou) started in 1920. This high school is the origin of Saga University. Then, Saga Teacher's School (佐賀師範學校, Saga Shihan gakkou) and Saga Youth Teacher's School (佐賀青年師範學校, Saga Seinen Shihan gakkou) started in 1943-1944. These schools were named "Saga University" in 1949.

Saga Medical School (佐賀医科大学, Saga Ika daigaku) started in 1976. Saga University and Saga Medical School merged in 2003. And the National University was corporatised in 2004.

== Campus locations ==
- Honjo (本庄) Campus: Honjo, Saga City
- Nabeshima (鍋島) Campus: Nabeshima, Saga City

== Faculties and graduate schools ==
=== Faculties ===
- Honjo (本庄) Campus
  - Culture and Education
  - Economics
  - Science and Engineering
  - Agriculture
- Nabeshima (鍋島) Campus
  - Medicine

=== Graduate schools ===
- Honjo (本庄) Campus
  - Education (Master's programme)
  - Economics (Master's programme)
  - Engineering (Master's and Doctorate programme)
  - Agriculture (Master's programme)
- Nabeshima (鍋島) Campus
  - Medicine (Master's and Doctorate programme)
- Other
  - The United Graduate School of Agricultural Sciences, Kagoshima University (Doctorate programme)

== Exchange program ==
Saga University offers an exchange program called SPACE (Saga University Program for Academic Exchange). SPACE is a one-year program, with its main purpose to increase the exchange student's Japanese skills. SPACE offers independent study that allows the exchange student to conduct a simple research project with a professor.

== Ranking ==
From "World Universities' ranking on the Web: top 4,000 World Ranking." in July 2008, Saga University (Japan) was ranked 1298.

== Alumni ==
- Keiko Ai (writer)
- Muhammed Alamgir (geotechnical engineer and university vice-chancellor)
- Kozueko Morimoto (cartoonist)
- Kuntoro Boga Andri (Researcher)
