= Keiko Katsukata =

Okinawan researcher (born 1947)

Keiko Katsukata (born 1947) is an Okinawan researcher. She was a professor at Waseda University, and the former director of the institute for Ryukyuan and Okinawan studies. Katsukata was born in Uruma City in Okinawa Prefecture. Katsukata received the 24th the Okinawa Bunka Kyokai Award (Zenchu Nakahara Award) in 2002. She specializes in Contemporary American Literature, Gender studies, Okinawan Studies and Ethnicity Studies.

== Timeline ==
- 1983 Completed the doctoral program in contemporary American literature at Waseda University Graduate School of Letters, Arts and Science
- 1985 Full-time lecturer at Nihon University college of art
- 1991 Full-time lecturer at Waseda University School of Law
- 1992 Assistant professor at Waseda University School of Law
- 1996 Visiting lecturer at City University of New York Graduate School
- 1998 Professor at Waseda University School of Law
- 2004–2018 Professor at Waseda University's School of International Liberal Studies

== Academic focus ==
=== American literature ===
Katsukata's academic interests rooted from American literature, especially works by minority groups, Native American and black authors, which led her to women's literature. She was so fascinated by the world of women's literature that she compiled the book that acquaints 300 female writers.

She devoted herself to accomplishment of women editors in 1920s, as she stated that she even thought that a topic of her life work had been found.

=== Gender studies ===
As Katukata described her own fate "was to never have my interests remain in one area," her focus gradually transformed into gender studies.

In 1993, she started to be in charge of one of the general education seminars in the School of Law at Waseda University. Around the time, students who had just came back from studying abroad requested that she open a gender theory class. Katsukata decided to teach a seminar called ‘Women Studies’, and was surprised that half of the students were men, which was contrary to her expectations. It was the right timing for starting gender studies, partly because the word, gender, had been started to use in Japanese media, as she observed. Her seminar turned into a lecture called "gender studies" that was aimed at every student at the university in 1997. 400 students attended the lecture.

With that as a start, the university had begun to introduce women studies and gender theory and in 2000, the Gender Studies Institute was established.

=== Okinawan studies ===
In 2006, the Institute for Ryukyuan and Okinawan Studies (2006 - 2015) was founded, and Katsukata assumed the position of the director, partly because the university had the relationship with Nobumoto Ohama who was inaugurated the President of Waseda university for 12 years. He was born in Ishigaki Island, which is located in Ryukyu area, and played a significant role in a process of the return of Okinawa from the U.S.

Since she was born and raised in Okinawa, Japan, the faculty members at the university asked Katsukata to be responsible for the institute, however, she was not willing to at first. It was because of trauma she was holding as well as the whole community in Okinawa.

Katsukata recalled that it was such a load off her mind to move to Tokyo, and get rid of pressure of Okinawa.

Whereas, by the time she accepted the offer of the director at the institute, Katsukata realized that her feelings about where she came from began to change. She said that "this shift to Okinawan research came from my desire to use theory in order to free myself from the "Okinawa" that was festering inside me, and to create peace for myself".

In her last lecture before retirement, Katsukata shared a personal message with her students, reflecting on the experiences of Okinawan women living in the Kanto area. She specifically referred to the rape of a twelve-year-old girl by three U.S. servicemen in 1995 that had a deep impact on her. A local newspaper, Okinawa Shinpou, reported that Katsukata gave courage to women in Okinawa by her words.

== Published works ==
- 1985 "Image of Women in American Literature" 『アメリカ文学の女性像』 (Keisou shobou)
- 1987 "Feminist Theorists"『フェミニスト群像』 (Keiso shobou)
- 1993 "Encyclopedia of American Women Authors" 『アメリカ女性作家小事典』(Yushoudou shoten)
- 1997 "Unequal Sisters -Race, Class and gender in History of Women in America" 『差異に生きる姉妹たち――アメリカ女性史における人種･階級･ジェンダー』(Seori shobou)
- 2001 "Gender and American Literature – A Symbol of Race and History" 『ジェンダーとアメリカ文学―人種と歴史の表象』 (Keisou shobou)
- 2002 "Following Women’s Footsteps: The History of Women in Naha" (Ryukyu shinpousha jigyoukyoku shuppansha)
- 2002 "Okinawan Studies Worldwide" 『世界に拓く沖縄研究』 (4th Okinawa Research International Symposium Executive Committee)
- 2003 "Family, Gender and Law" 『家族・ジェンダーと法』(Seibundou)
- 2006 "The Beginning of Women Studies in Okinawa" おきなわ女性学事始』 (Shinjuku shobou)
- 2010 "Introduction to Okinawan Studies – Manners of Hungry" 『沖縄学入門―空腹の作法』 (Shouwa dou)
