= Keiko Sugita =

Japanese politician

- 杉田 馨子

Member of the House of Representatives
- In office 10 April 1946 – 31 March 1947
- Preceded by: Constituency established
- Succeeded by: Multi-member district
- Constituency: Ibaraki at-large

Personal details
- Born: 29 March 1908 Minato, Tokyo, Japan
- Died: 23 December 1992 (aged 84)
- Party: Liberal
- Education: Japan Women's University

Keiko Sugita (Japanese: 杉田馨子; 29 March 1908 – 23 December 1992) was a Japanese politician. She was one of the first group of women elected to the House of Representatives in 1946.

== Biography ==
Sugita graduated from the English Department of Japan Women's University in 1929. She married Shogo Sugita, a reporter for Yorozu Choho.

After World War II, Sugita joined the Liberal Party. With her husband unable to run for office, she was a Liberal candidate in Ibaragi in the 1946 general elections (the first in which women could vote), and was elected to the House of Representatives. She lost her seat in the 1947 elections, in which she ran in the Ibaraki 3rd district.

With Shogo having died in 1946, Sugita later ran an inn at Shima Onsen.
