= Keiko Ai =

Japanese writer

Keiko Ai (阿井景子, Ai Keiko; born Junko Ura on January 16, 1932 in Nagasaki, Japan) is a Japanese writer.

Born in Nagasaki in Nagasaki Prefecture, Ai graduated from Saga University with a major in education. She then became a high school teacher. Ai soon quit and moved to Tokyo, where she took dictation for Kitaoji Rosanjin. After working as an editor and a reporter for Josei Jishin, she married and divorced in 1974, during which time she also worked on Matsumoto Seicho. Ai published her first book as Junko Ura in 1971 and made her debut as a writer in 1979 with Ryoma's Wife. Ai portrays the women around Japanese historical figures, particularly those related to Ryoma Sakamoto. Since 1991 she has often written in conjunction with historical dramas.

== Publications ==
- A Handy Small Dictionary for Housewives: Preserving and Caring for Household Items by Junko Ura, Ikeda Shoten, 1971
- Ryōma's Wife (龍馬の妻), published by Gakugei Shōrin, 1979 (later published by Shueisha and Chikuma)
- "Nobunaga's Aunt," published by Gakugei Shōrin, 1982 (later by Kodansha)
- "The Cruelty of Tsukiyamadono," by Heibonsha, 1983 (later by Kodansha)
- "Ryōma's Other Wife," published in Mainichi Shimbun, 1985 (later published by Bunshun)
- Superhuman: Minakata Kumagusu and His Wife, Fluent in 18 Languages, published by Kodansha, 1985 (later by Shueisha)
- The Women of the Saigo Family, published by Bungeishunjū, 1987 (later in paperback)
- "Wives Who Colored the Meiji Era," Shinjinbutsu Oraisha, 1990
- "Women of Hototogisu," Bungeishunjū, 1991
- Afterglow of the Taiheiki, Kodansha, 1991
- Nohime's Soul-Sorrow, Kodansha, 1992, later in paperback
- The Flowers of Kacho - Hino Tomiko, President Inc., 1994
- Memories: Matsumoto Seichō, Kitaoji Rosanjin, Bungeishunjū, 1995
- "My Spiritual Mentors: Seicho and Rosanjin," Chuokoron-Shinsha
- "Hideyoshi's Ambition," Kodansha, 1996, later published by Kobunsha
- Tears, Rankantari: Takeda Katsuyori's Wife, Kodansha, 1999
- "The Wife of Sanada Yukimura" (Kobunsha, 2001)
- "Ryoma's Sister, Otome" (Kobunsha, 2004)
- "Ryoma and the Eight Women" (Ebisu Kosho Publishing, 2005, later Chikuma Bunko)
- Kodaiin One (Kobunsha, 2006)
- Shingen's Principal Wife (Kobunsha, 2007)
- "Diary of Princess Kazunomiya" (Kobunsha, 2008)
- "The Demon Prefectural Governor, Mishima Michitsune and His Wife" (Shinjinbutsu Oraisha, 2008)
- Okiku Goryoin - Kagekatsu's Principal Wife (Kobunsha Historical Novel Library, 2009)
- Mitochoe no E (Kobunsha Historical Novel Library, 2011)
- Love: The Life of Ōyama Iwao's Wife (Kobunsha Historical Novel Library, 2012)
