= School of International Liberal Studies =

Undergraduate school of Waseda University

Coordinates: 35.7092°N 139.7188°E

School of International Liberal Studies, Waseda University
- Type: Private liberal arts
- Established: 2004
- Affiliations: Waseda University
- Dean: DETEY, Sylvain
- Students: 2,863 (2015)
- Location: Shinjuku, Tokyo, Japan
- Website: www.waseda.jp/fire/sils/en/

The School of International Liberal Studies (SILS, 国際教養学部) is an English-medium undergraduate faculty of Waseda University in Tokyo. Created in 2004, it was the university’s first bachelor’s programme that can be completed entirely in English. About one-third of its students are international, and the faculty is frequently grouped with International Christian University, Akita International University, Ritsumeikan Asia Pacific University and Sophia University’s Faculty of Liberal Arts as one of Japan’s “Global Five” liberal-arts programmes.

== History ==
SILS was established under Waseda’s Faculty of International Research and Education during the university’s early-2000s drive to internationalise its curriculum. It offers undergraduate degrees in English for both domestic and international students. It aims to attract open-minded, globally mobile learners.

== Academics ==
All instruction is delivered in English. Students enter one of three “Study Plans”:

- SP1 – Japanese-educated students (includes a compulsory one-year study-abroad component)
- SP2 – Degree-seeking international students
- SP3 – Semester- or year-long exchange students

== Student body ==
As of May 2015 the school enrolled 715 international students, the largest cohort in any undergraduate faculty at Waseda. SILS sends more students on mid- to long-term study abroad than any other Waseda faculty.

== Location ==
The faculty occupied Building 19 until 2009, when it relocated to the purpose-built Building 11 on Waseda’s main campus, which it shares with the School of Commerce.

== See also ==
- Waseda University
- English-medium instruction in Japanese higher education
