= Keiko Holmes =

- 恵子・ホームズ
- Born: 1948 (age 77–78); Kiwa-cho, Kumano, Mie Prefecture, Japan
- Honours: Honorary O.B.E; Order of the Rising Sun
- Website: http://www.agapeworld.com/index.htm

Keiko Holmes (恵子・ホームズ) (born 1948) is a Japanese coordinator for a charity named Agape, which helps to promote reconciliation between Japan and its former World War II prisoners of war (POWs). She lectures at universities and schools, and was awarded the O.B.E.

== Early life ==
Keiko was born in Kiwa-cho, Kumano, Mie Prefecture, Japan in 1948. She travelled to Tokyo to study, and there met Paul Holmes, a visiting businessman from England. They married and then moved to London with their sons Daniel and Christopher in, 1979.

Paul was killed in an air accident in 1984 while on a business trip. They had been together for 15 years. Through Paul, Keiko had converted to Christianity. During their time in Japan, while living in Mie, the couple had come across a memorial stone laid for 16 British army soldiers. The soldiers had died in the local area called Iruka, now called Kiwa-cho, while working as prisoners in a copper mine. The local people had created the memorial and had written the names of the soldiers on the memorial. The Iruka mine was different from many others because the British soldiers worked side by side with Japanese miners.

When Keiko returned to Mie for a trip after Paul's death, she went back to the memorial site and was surprised to see that it had been improved into a memorial garden with a marble headstone and kept beautifully decorated with flowers. The soldiers' names had been engraved on a large copper cross.

Holmes had the inspiration to organise reconciliation trips for ex-POWs of Iruka during her long period of mourning for her husband.

In 1991, Holmes attended the annual conference of the British Far East Prisoners of War Association in London.

In October 1992, Holmes took 26 FEPOWs and two widows back to attend a memorial service at the Iruka (now called Itaya) memorial. These men and women had for 50 years held hatred and bitterness for Japan and its people. Upon arrival at the memorial and witnessing the beauty of the memorial donated by the local people and receiving their sincere apologies the 50 years of hate gave way to new positive feelings and healing.

== Career ==
Since the first pilgrimage, Holmes has gone on to organise more trips and eventually founded "Agape" in 1996. The name is taken from an ancient Greek word meaning unconditional love. Supported by many people in Britain and Japan, as well as by donations from Japanese firms, including Sumitomo Corp. The Bank of Tokyo Mitsubishi and many others. Agape now brings small veteran groups from Britain, the Netherlands, Canada, Australia, and New Zealand to Japan twice a year. On the trips, the FEPOWs come face to face with their old guards. Former soldiers, camp and prison guards often attend the Agape memorial service and meetings. Hiroshi Abe was a young officer in a railway regiment during the war assigned to the infamous Thai-Burma railway known to FEPOWs as the "Death Railway". He attends the memorial every year to meet the soldiers. Abe's apology is printed in the Agape pamphlet:

"I cannot deny that l am partly responsible for the deaths of many POWs, and l apologise sincerely for what we did during the war."

After many uphill struggles since the first pilgrimage to Japan in 1992. Agape has taken hundreds of FEPOWs to Japan's former war camp sites. Many FEPOWs express how their hatred towards Japan has changed into love for the Japanese people. Holmes was awarded the O.B.E by Queen Elizabeth II at Windsor Castle on 28 April 1998. She attended the ceremony with her sons Daniel and Christopher.

In 2003, Holmes met the Emperor and Empress of Japan in Buckingham Palace, England. In 2018 she received the Order of the Rising Sun.

In 2004 Holmes, Kosuge and some other members of Agape including Holmes' son Daniel Holmes went to Nanjing, China to apologise for the crimes committed and pain inflicted by her countrymen during the war. Holmes has also visited Malaysia, the Netherlands, Thailand, Hong Kong, Taiwan, Singapore, Australia, the United States, Canada and India holding meetings and lecturing at universities.
