= Keiko Hattori =

Geochemist, mineralogist and academic

- Occupations: Geochemist, mineralogist and academic

Academic background
- Education: BSc., Geology (1972); MSc., Geology (1974); PhD., Geochemistry (1977)
- Alma mater: University of Tokyo

Keiko Hattori is a Japanese geochemist and mineralogist. She is Distinguished University Professor of Geochemistry and Mineral Deposits in the Department of Earth and Environmental Sciences at the University of Ottawa.

Hattori is most known for her research on aspects of Earth's atmospheric and mantle evolution, as well as the formation of arc volcanoes and the generation of metal-fertile volcanic arcs. Her application of this knowledge has led to insights regarding the origins and locations of mineral deposits. Specifically, she has conducted research on the transfer of chalcophile elements (copper-like elements) from slabs to arc magmas through mantle wedges, as well as from arc magmas to mineral deposits. Additionally, her work has encompassed exploration geochemistry, where she has investigated the dispersion of metals from buried deposits including platinum and palladium in surface media. She was appointed as the 2022 International Exchange Lecturer of the Society of Economic Geologists (SEG), and has been the recipient of the Island Arc Award and the Takeo Kato Gold Medal.

Hattori is an elected Fellow of the Royal Society of Canada and Mineralogical Society of America.

== Education ==
Hattori was the first female undergraduate student in the Geology Department at the University of Tokyo, which was established in 1877. She completed her master's and PhD in isotope geochemistry there.

== Career ==
Hattori began her academic career as a postdoctoral researcher at the University of Alberta in Edmonton in 1977 and participated in the International Drilling project as a Canadian delegate to study volcanic rocks and thermal alteration in Iceland. In 1980, she moved to the University of Calgary as a research associate jointly affiliated with the Department of Physics and the Department of Geology and Geophysics. Three years later, she joined the University of Ottawa as an assistant professor and was promoted to associate professor in the Department of Geology in 1987.

She was the first female professor in earth science departments within the national capital region as well as the first female professor of mineral deposits in Canada. In 1994 she became full professor in the Department of Earth and Environmental Sciences at the University of Ottawa. She was awarded the title of Distinguished University Professor in 2023 for her contributions to scientific research and education.

Hattori has held numerous administrative appointments throughout her career. From July 1991 to June 1994, she served as the director of the Ottawa-Carleton Geoscience Centre. In 2004, she was appointed as the department chair for Earth Sciences at the University of Ottawa, a position she held for four years.

Apart from the administrative work related to universities, she has been engaged in the activities of several scientific organizations including Mineralogical Society of America, Society of Economic Geologists, and Royal Society of Canada. She is Director of Earth, Ocean and Atmosphere Science Division of Royal Society of Canada (2021-2024).

Hattori was an appraiser of graduate-research programs at various Ontario Universities (1999-2002) and geoscience program reviewers of American University of Beirut in Lebanon (2016-17), Western University (2012) and Hiroshima University (2009).

Hattori has been appointed as visiting professor at Université de Lyon (1999) and l'Universiteé Grenoble (2016), visiting scientist at Japan Marine Science and Technology (2003-2004), visiting professor at Nagoya Institute, Guest Research Scientists at Woods Hole Oceanographic Institution (1995-1996), Visiting Research Scientist at Massachusetts Institute of Technology (1989-1990).

== Research ==
Hattori has made contributions to the field of earth sciences, utilizing trace element geochemistry and stable and radiogenic isotopes to understand the earth processes. During the early stages of her career, she focused on studying active volcanoes and associated hydrothermal activity. However, a tragic accident atop a Colombian volcano, resulting in the loss of several colleagues, prompted her to shift her research focus to ancient volcanic terranes in Canada. Over the past 14 years, she has conducted research in various regions of subduction zones worldwide, where oceanic crust subducts and forms arc volcanoes and mountain belts. Her investigations involve examining rocks and collecting samples to analyze the intricate processes of subduction and the subsequent return of materials to the surface through volcanoes. Her research areas have included the Himalayas (Northern Pakistan, Northern India), Italian and French Alps, Turkey, China, Japan, Philippines, Peru, and the Dominican Republic.

Hattori's contributions to the earth sciences primarily center on utilizing the abundance of redox-sensitive elements and their isotopic compositions to interpret processes from the surface to the mantle. Her discoveries include the timing of the abrupt rise in atmospheric oxygen content at around 2.2 billion years ago during Earth's evolution, the definition of osmium isotope evolution in the mantle, the identification of serpentine as the reservoir of water and fluid-mobile elements in the mantle, and the provision of evidence that oxidized mafic magmas bring base metals and sulfur from the mantle to form giant copper deposits that supply many critical metals for society. In addition, her work has contributed to the discovery of such critical metal deposits through the mobility of metals in surface waters.

=== Earth's surface environmental evolution ===
Hattori presented evidence in her Nature paper that, resolved the long-standing debate regarding the timing of the change in ancient Earth's surface oxidation. Her findings demonstrated that atmospheric oxygen levels were still low around 2.4 billion years ago, during the early Proterozoic, based on detailed sulfur isotope analysis of sedimentary rocks on the north shore of Lake Huron. In her subsequent work published in Science, she revealed that atmospheric oxygen levels sharply rose within the sedimentary sequence at about 2.3 billion years.

Hattori also highlighted the role of volcanic processes in shaping the surface redox condition, challenging the previously held belief that increased photosynthesis was solely responsible for the oxidation of Earth's surface environment. Subsequent work provided further confirmation of the crystallization of oxidized magmatic sulfates during igneous crystallization, as well as the presence of such sulfate minerals in ancient (2.6 billion years old) igneous rocks.

=== Mantle evolution ===
Hattori defined the osmium isotope evolution of Earth's mantle, providing evidence for an accretion of chondritic meteorites after the core-mantle separation.

Prior to Hattori's research, the origin of large nuggets of platinum-group metals in streams was a subject of debate, with some proposing river water formation under a tropical climate and others suggesting mechanical erosion from rocks. However, her research presented evidence supporting their formation in rocks at high temperatures, followed by erosion to streams.

Through Hattori's research, it was also revealed that platinum grains found in streams contain oxygen, which led to initial suggestions of platinum oxide; however, using synchrotron techniques, it was demonstrated that the oxygen is combined with iron, not with platinum.

=== Roles of serpentinites ===
Hattori argued that the prevailing view for volcano formation in arcs ic arc formation, that water is released rapidly from subducting slabs when they are metamorphosed to eclogite facies, is inconsistent with geological evidence. Instead, she proposed an alternative mechanism, suggesting that water is continuously released from slabs and stored as serpentinites (hydrated mantle rocks) and stressed that the subsequent dehydration of these serpentinites triggers the formation of arc volcanoes. Her work has established the importance and distribution of serpentinites on the major ocean floors, which control seismic activity and may potentially have played a role in the origin of life on the planet.

Additionally, Hattori's work highlighted that heavy metals and metalloids, such as arsenic and antimony, are generally considered to be concentrated in sulphides, but under sulphur-deficient conditions, these elements behave like normal rock-forming elements.

=== Oxidation condition of the mantle ===
Hattori and De Hoog, after considering the debate surrounding the cause of varying oxidation conditions in igneous rocks at shallow crustal levels, documented that highly oxidized conditions of rocks are an intrinsic character of the source magma in the mantle. They emphasized the capability of oxidized magmas to transport large quantities of sulfur and metals as well.

In her 1995 work, Hattori provided the initial documentation of oxidized arsenic in the overall reduced mantle, as arsenic is present by replacing Si. One of her PhD students, Jian Wangm, evaluated the redox state of mantle rocks and discovered that carbon is the primary control for the oxidation conditions of the mantle in subduction zones.

=== Oxidized mafic magmas for the formation of base metal deposits ===
Hattori's research interest has also extended to porphyry-type deposits, which supply critical metals such as copper, molybdenum, and gold. Through her research, she presented evidence supporting the notion that sulfur and metals have their origin in the mantle, and proposed that they were extracted and transported by mafic magmas from the mantle to shallow crustal levels. This proposal was based on her earlier work on Pinatubo eruption products, where metals and sulphur are released from mafic magmas during their ascent and incorporated into overlying erupted felsic magmas. Furthermore, Cees-Jan DeHoog, her postdoctoral research fellow, provided evidence that oxidized magmas are capable to transport metals and sulphur from deep in the mantle to shallow levels of crust.

=== Dispersion of metals in surface media ===
Hattori developed analytical methods that demonstrated the high mobility of palladium as soluble neutral to anionic complexes in surface waters. This behavior allows the metal to disperse widely from its sources, and to become incorporated into plants and organic-rich soil. Her research findings have been presented at various industry-oriented workshops, including short courses associated with the International Platinum Conference in Oulu, Finland, and the Prospectors and Developers Association meeting in Toronto. In addition, her research provided a contrasting perspective to the previously assumed origin of metals in peat from the Hudson Bay Lowland. While it was previously assumed that the metals in peat originated from industrial activity far south of the northern region, she demonstrated that the compositions of ombrotrophic peat are strongly influenced by the underlying rocks, even those located as deep as 20 metres below the surface. This observation further highlighted that the composition of peat may serve as a useful indicator to locate concealed deposits, including kimberlites, which are host to diamonds.

Hattori also examined sturdy minerals that can be dispersed by streams and glaciers to evaluate their usefulness in finding mineral deposits.

== Awards and honors ==
- 2011 – Elected Fellow, Royal Society of Canada
- 2012 – Elected Fellow, Mineralogical Society of America
- 2013 – Island Arc Award, the Geological Society of Japan
- 2022 – Takeo Kato Gold Medal, the Society of Resource Geology
- 2022 – International Exchange Lecturer, Society of Economic Geologists
- 2023 – Distinguished University Professor, University of Ottawa
- 2024 - Duncan R. Derry Medal from Geological Association of Canada

== Selected articles ==
- Hattori, K. (1993). High-sulfur magma, a product of fluid discharge from underlying mafic magma: evidence from Mount Pinatubo, Philippines. Geology, 21(12), 1083–1086.
- Hattori, K. H., & Keith, J. D. (2001). Contribution of mafic melt to porphyry copper mineralization: evidence from Mount Pinatubo, Philippines, and Bingham Canyon, Utah, USA. Mineralium Deposita, 36, 799–806.
- Hattori, K. H., & Guillot, S. (2003, April). Volcanic fronts as a consequence of serpentinite dehydration in the mantle wedge. In EGS-AGU-EUG Joint Assembly.
- Takahashi, Y., Minamikawa, R., Hattori, K. H., Kurishima, K., Kihou, N., & Yuita, K. (2004). Arsenic behavior in paddy fields during the cycle of flooded and non-flooded periods. Environmental Science & Technology, 38(4), 1038–1044.
- Guillot, S., Hattori, K., 2013. Serpentinites: Essential roles in geodynamics, arc volcanism, sustainable development, and the origin of life. Elements, 9 (2),. 95-98. Doi: 10.2113/gselements.9.2.25
- Hattori, K. H., & Guillot, S. (2003l). Volcanic fronts as a consequence of serpentinite dehydration in the mantle wedge.Geology, 31 (6), 525-528.
- Hattori, K., Takahashi, Y., Guillot, S., & Johanson, B. (2005). Occurrence of arsenic (V) in forearc mantle serpentinites based on X-ray absorption spectroscopy study. Geochimica et Cosmochimica Acta, 69(23), 5585–5596.
- Pagé, L., & Hattori, K. (2017). Tracing halogen and B cycling in subduction zones based on obducted, subducted and forearc serpentinites of the Dominican Republic. Scientific Reports, 7(1), 17776.
