= Keiki (given name) =

- Gender: Both

Origin
- Origin: Japanese
- Meaning: Different meanings depending on the kanji used

Keiki (written: 慶樹 or 慶記) is both a feminine and a masculine Japanese given name. Notable people with the name include:

- Keiki Nishiyama (西山 慶樹; born 1988), Japanese volleyball player
- Keiki Shimizu (清水 慶記; born 1985), Japanese footballer
- Keiki Iijima (飯島 恵喜; born 1985), Japanese hurdler
- Keiki Haniyasushin (埴安神 袿姫), a fictional character in Wily Beast and Weakest Creature from the Touhou Project video game franchise
