= Keiko Itoh =

Japanese historian (born 1947)

Keiko Itoh is a Japanese writer and historian in the United Kingdom.

== Life and education ==
Itoh was born in Kobe and was educated at Manhattanville College, she graduated with a BA in History from Swarthmore College in 1974 and then a MA in East Asian studies from Yale in 1976 Yale. She worked at the UN, where she met and subsequently married British journalist Tommy Helsby. In 1991 they moved to the UK, Itoh was press officer for the European Bank for Reconstruction and Development and then worked at the World Bank which she left in 1999.

In 2001 Itoh completed a PhD in history from the London School of Economics on "The Japanese immigrant community in inter-war London: diversity and cohesion", exploring the Japanese community in 1920s and 1930s Britain. As part of her research she organised the exhibition "A Visual History of the Japanese in Britain" in London.

== Writing and media ==
Itoh's PhD thesis was published in 2001 as a book entitled The Japanese Community in Pre-war Britain: From Integration to Disintegration by Curzon Press, now Routledge.

In 2013 she contributed a chapter on 'The Human Legacy of the Japan-British Exhibition' to the book Commerce and Culture at the 1910 Japan-British Exhibition: Centenary Perspectives, edited by Ayako Hotta-Lister and Ian Nish.

In 2015 Itoh published My Shanghai with Renaissance Books, the historical novel looks at the life of the Japanese community in Shanghai in the 1940s. The main character is London-educated protagonist Eiko Kishimoto who is based on Itoh's mother.

In 2021 Itoh was interviewed for the Earth 2 Air podcast by New Earth Theatre and she contributed to the Thames Festival Trust series about the Japanese Seamen's Club in Silvertown. In 2022 she gave a talk at the Embassy of Japan, London on how the Japanese community grew in the UK from the late 19th century onwards.
