= Keiko Masumoto =

Japanese artist

Keiko Masumoto is a Japanese artist from Hyogo specializing in contemporary ceramics. She attended the Kyoto City University of Arts. Masumoto’s work looks to combine both art and craft. Her preferred techniques are hand-building and throwing on the wheel.

Masumoto’s work features in several Japanese galleries and has been shown worldwide in places like London, Seoul and Canada.

== Career ==
Masumoto draws inspirations from Japanese culture (both present and past) including the Japanese tea ceremony. A concept important to the artist, is using the outline of a vessel to form part of the piece. In her own words, Masumoto has stated: “I try to subvert traditional ideas of the vessel, so that the motif is the form, and the vessel the decoration”. For Masumoto, the vessel is not intended to be the central focus for the viewer. Instead the artist's unusual placements and combinations are intended to be the art's focal point.

Kitsch Kogei is one Masumoto's notable works and features in the ICN Gallery. In 2008, the artist received her first solo-exhibition at the Ishida Taiseisha hall (Kyoto). In 2015 and 2017, Masumoto featured in the Art Fair Tokyo. Examplesof Masumoto's art are displayed in Victoria and Albert Museum in London, Toyota Municipal Museum of Art (Toyota) and The Shigaraki Ceramic Cultural Park.

== Awards and recognition ==
- Toshiba Japanese Ceramics Resident at Victoria and Albert Museum (2013);
- Yamaguchi Citizens Cultural Festival Award 2006 (first prize);
- The Annual Exhibition of Kyoto City University of Arts of the Arts 2007 (Mayor's Award for Graduate School);
- Grand Prix Tokyo Wonder Wall 2009 (Curator's Choice Award);
- University of the Arts Philadelphia 'Artist in Residence' (2010)
