= Keiko Ota =

Brazilian politician (born 1956)

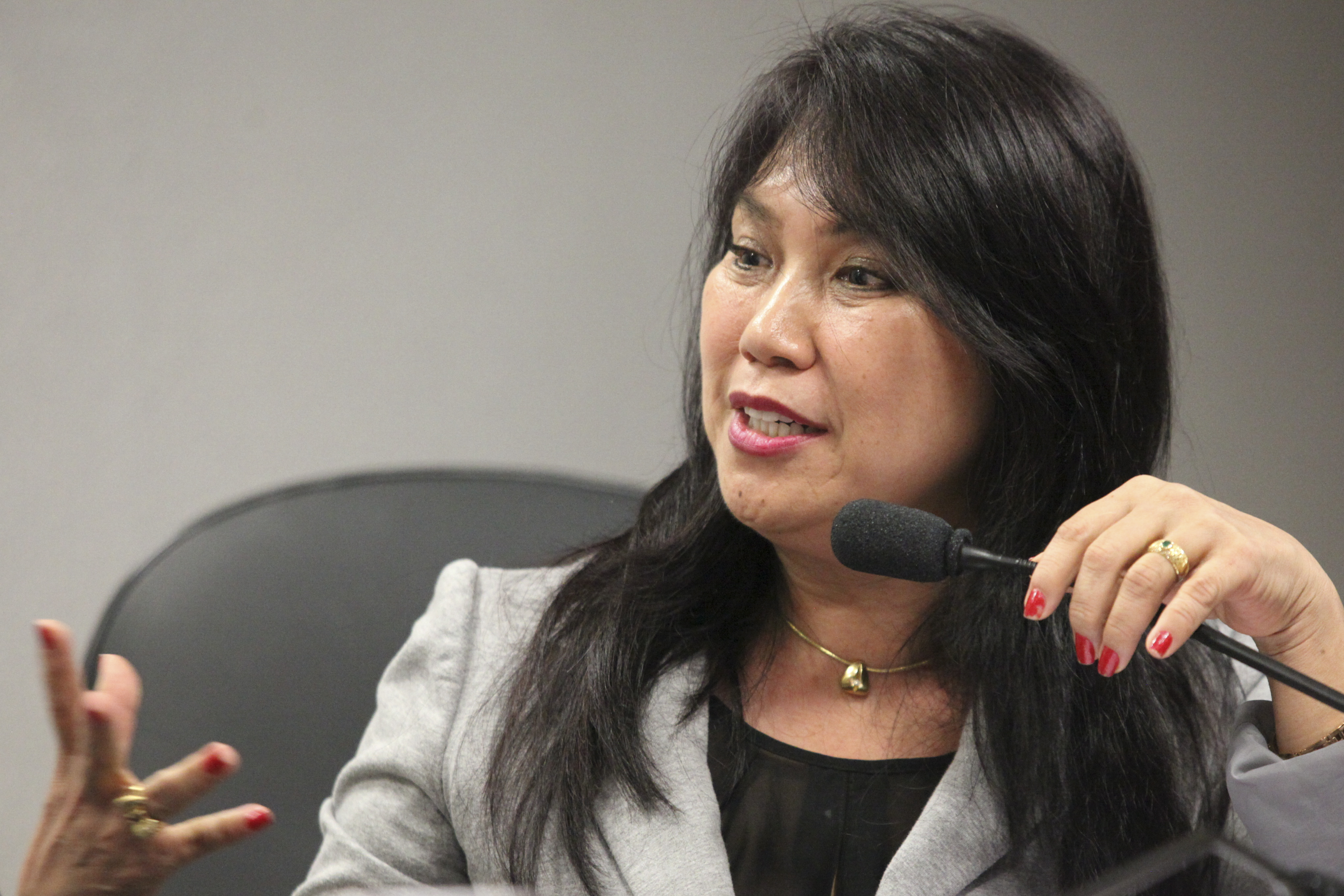
- Ota in April 2015

Federal Deputy for São Paulo
- In office 1 February 2011 – 31 January 2019

Personal details
- Born: 28 September 1956 (age 70) Olímpia, São Paulo, Brazil
- Party: MDB (2021–present)
- Other political affiliations: PSB (2009–2021)

Iolanda Keiko Miashiro Ota (born 28 September 1956), better known as Keiko Ota, is a Brazilian politician. She has spent her political career representing her home state of São Paulo, having served as state representative from 2011 to 2019.

== Personal life ==
Ota's father is Nio Miashiro. She is of second generation Japanese descent. Ota is married to local politician Masataka Ota, and the couple have three children: Ives, Ises, and Vanessa. In 1997, Ives, who was only eight years old at the time, was kidnapped and murdered by one of Masataka's body guards, leading Ota and her husband to campaign against violent crime in Brazil.

== Political career ==
Ota voted in favor of the impeachment motion of then-president Dilma Rousseff. She would later vote in favor of opening a similar corruption investigation against Rousseff's successor Michel Temer, and voted against the proposed 2017 Brazilian labor reforms.
