= Keiko Mukaide =

Japanese artist (born 1954)

Keiko Mukaide (Japanese: 向出 圭子; born 1954 in Tokyo) is a Japanese artist who lives and works in Fife on the Scottish coast. She was an early winner of a Creative Scotland award and was shortlisted for the 1998 Jerwood Prize for glass.

== Education ==
Mukaide studied communication design at Musashino Art University in Tokyo, Japan, and received a master's degree in glass at the Royal College of Art in London. She was awarded a research fellowship from the Edinburgh College of Art.

== Artistic Style ==
Her art work employs a number of glass making techniques, casting and fusing glass in a kiln, manipulating glass in a blowing studio and gluing shards of dichroic glass to wire nets.

Her recent work has been to produce large scale, site specific installations constructed from multiple small scale glass items, including "Memory of Place" funded by The Arts Council of England and Scottish Arts Council at York St. Mary's, Castlegate, York.

In 2007, Mukaide collaborated with Si Applied Ltd. on Cutting Edge, a 90 m stainless steel sculpture in Sheaf Square, Sheffield, UK. The piece was commissioned by the Sheffield City Council as part of their "Heart of the City" project, a 10-year improvement of a pedestrian route in the city. Cutting Edge received the joint Marsh Award for Public Sculpture in 2008.

== Exhibitions and collections ==
- Memory of Place, York St Mary's , 2007-8
- Light of the North, Tate St Ives, 2006
- Spirit of Place, Talbot Rice Gallery, Edinburgh, 2003
- One Crowded Hour, collaboration with Tabula Rasa Dance Company, Scotland 2001
- Between Seen and Unseen (Miegakari), Hill House, Helensburgh, Scotland 2001
- Elemental Traces, Royal Botanic Garden Edinburgh 2000
- Collection of The Victoria and Albert Museum, London
- Collection of The Corning Museum of Glass, USA

== Awards ==
- Shortlisted for the 1998 Jerwood Applied Art Prize
