= Kei Takeoka =

Japanese tarento and motoring journalist (born 1969)

- 竹岡 圭
- Born: March 30, 1969 (age 56); Tokyo, Japan
- Occupation: Motoring journalist
- Agent: Production Jinrikisha
- Height: 1.62 m (5 ft 4 in)

Kei Takeoka (竹岡 圭, Takeoka Kei; born March 30, 1969, in Tokyo, Japan) is a Japanese tarento and motoring journalist who is a member of the board of directors of the Japan Automobile Journalists Association.

== Biography ==
Takeoka was a car critic office lady. On 2007 she belonged to Office Esutohe and began working as a tarento. Takeoka's mottoes and themes are "Kuruma & Car Life o Tanoshimou!", "Kuruma to Eco to Seikatsu to", and "Sekaijuu de Chou-sho Hashi". She speaks in the broadcast media and motor shows. Takeoka also introduced cars on a woman's perspective in television and radio series. She helps women working in the society and doing activities such as being respectful, transportation, safety, and ecology.

Takeoka writes in Motor Magazine, Holiday Auto, and KC. She owns a BMW Mini, a Volkswagen Scirocco, and a Honda Beat. In October 2013, Takeoka announced in her blog that she moved to Production Jinrikisha.

== Career ==
Takeoka is a member of the Board of Directors on the Japan Automobile Journalists Association (A.J.A.J.), Selection Committee of the Car of the Year Japan, Committee of the Ministry of Land, Infrastructure, Transport and Tourism, committee of highway companies in the prefectures of Japan, jury of the automotive technology exhibition "Jase Exposition Award", special lecturer of the Kantou Kougyou Jidousha Dai Gakkou, a child safety seat trainer, and a holder of the Motor Sports License.

== Books ==
Year	Title	Notes
1996	Dorateku Shinka-ron: Yasuo Kusakabe no Role-playing Dorateku Kouza	Co-author

== Filmography ==
=== TV series ===
Year	Title	Network	Notes
2011	Ogiyahagi no Aisha Henreki No Car, No Life!	BS NTV	Regular appearances
