= Keiko Tanaka (footballer) =

Japanese footballer (born 1986)

Personal information
- Date of birth: 6 May 1986 (age 40)
- Place of birth: Japan
- Height: 1.80 m (5 ft 11 in)
- Position: Striker

Team information
- Current team: Gladesville Ravens

Senior career*
Years	Team	Apps	(Gls)
2007–2011	TEPCO Mareeze		
2012	MyNavi Sendai		
2013–2017	NHK Spring Yokohama FC Seagulls		
2020	NWS Koalas FC		
2021–	Gladesville Ravens		
- * Club domestic league appearances and goals

Keiko Tanaka (Japanese: 田中景子; born 6 May 1986) is a Japanese footballer who plays as a defender or midfielder for Gladesville Ravens.

== Early life ==
Tanaka started playing football during fourth grade.

== Career ==
In 2013, Tanaka signed for Japanese side NHK Spring Yokohama FC Seagulls, where she captained the club. After that, she signed for Australian side NWS Koalas FC and left due to the coronavirus pandemic. Before the 2021 season, she signed for Australian side Gladesville Ravens, helping the club achieve promotion.

== Personal life ==
Tanaka has worked as a football coach and at a Japanese restaurant.
