= Kei Yoshimizu =

Japanese actor (born 1940)

- 吉水 慶
- Born: Fumio Yoshimizu; October 4, 1940 (age 85); Ōsaka Prefecture, Japan
- Occupations: Actor, voice actor
- Years active: 1960's - 1990's
- Children: Nancy Yoshimizu

Fumio Yoshimizu (吉水 文夫, Yoshimizu Fumio; born October 4, 1940), better known as Kei Yoshimizu (吉水 慶, Yoshimizu Kei), is a Japanese actor and voice actor from Ōsaka Prefecture.

He is a graduate of Ryukoku University. He was affiliated with The Bungaku Company before transferring to Theatre Company Subaru. Now retired from acting, he currently works as a Buddhist monk.

== Roles ==
=== Television drama ===
- Tenkagomen (Junan Nakagawa)

=== Television animation ===
- Lupin III: Steal Napoleon's Dictionary! (Robert Hawk)
- Madō King Granzort (Headman Dolby)
- Manga Nihon Emaki (Masako Hōjō)
- Mashin Hero Wataru 2 (Elfan, Doc Hottoitē, Daibutatta)
- Nobody's Boy: Remi (Pierre Acquan)

=== OVA ===
- Record of Lodoss War (Firumā)

=== Dubbing roles ===
==== Live action ====
- Born on the Fourth of July (VHS edition) (Legion Commander (Ed Lauter), Marine Major (John Getz))
- Die Hard 2 (General Ramon Esperanza (Franco Nero))
- Ghost (Subway Ghost (Vincent Schiavelli))
- The Guns of Navarone (Fuji TV edition) (Howard Barnsby)
- The Hunt for Red October (Dr. Jeffrey Pelt (Richard Jordan))
- Jaws (TBS edition) (Mayor Larry Vaughn)
- Miracle on 34th Street (Fred Gailey)
- Navy SEALs (Video edition) (Ben Shaheed)
- The NeverEnding Story (Cairon (Moses Gunn))
- Star Trek: The Next Generation (Jean-Luc Picard (first voice) (Patrick Stewart))
- Star Trek V: The Final Frontier (Laserdisc and common DVD editions) (John Talbot)
- Star Trek VI: The Undiscovered Country (Laserdisc and common DVD editions) (Spock)
- Tucker: The Man and His Dream (Abe Karatz (Martin Landau))

==== Animation ====
- Alice in Wonderland (Carpenter)
- DuckTales (Pony Canyon edition) (Scrooge McDuck)
- Dumbo (Straw Hat Crow)
- Fun and Fancy Free (Pony Canyon edition) (Mortimer Snerd)
- Mickey's Christmas Carol (Pony Canyon edition) (Scrooge McDuck)
- Robin Hood (Pony Canyon edition) (Little John)
- The Sword in the Stone (Pony Canyon edition) (Sir Ector)
- Thunderbirds Are Go (VHS edition) (Captain Paul Travers)
- The Many Adventures of Winnie the Pooh (Pony Canyon edition) (Gopher)
- Song of the South (Pony Canyon edition) (Br'er Turtle)
