= 2012 Sagan Tosu season =

Sagan Tosu
2012 season
- Chairman: Yukihiro Igawa
- Manager: Yoon Jung-Hwan
- J.League Division 1: 5th
- Emperor's Cup: 2nd round vs Kamatamare Sanuki
- J.League Cup: Group Stage
- Top goalscorer: League: Yohei Toyoda (16); All: Yohei Toyoda (17)
Home colours	Away colours

The 2012 Sagan Tosu season was Sagan Tosu's first season in J.League Division 1 after being promoted for J.League Division 2 in 2011. They finished the season in fifth position, narrowly missing out on an AFC Champions League spot by two points. They also participated in the J.League Cup, going out in the group stages, and the Emperor's Cup, where they reached the second round before defeat to Kamatamare Sanuki. It was their second season with Yoon Jung-hwan as their manager, and Yohei Toyoda was their top goalscorer with 16 league goals.

== Players ==
Note: Flags indicate national team as defined under FIFA eligibility rules; some limited exceptions apply. Players may hold more than one non-FIFA nationality.

No.	Pos.	Nation	Player
1	GK	JPN	Taku Akahoshi
2	DF	JPN	Kosuke Kitani
3	DF	JPN	Keita Isozaki
4	DF	JPN	Teruaki Kobayashi
5	DF	KOR	Kim Kun-Hoan (loan from Yokohama F. Marinos)
6	MF	JPN	Tomotaka Okamoto
7	MF	JPN	Keisuke Funatani
8	MF	JPN	Kota Mizunuma (loan from Yokohama F. Marinos)
9	FW	BRA	Tozin (loan from Corinthians Alagoano)
10	MF	KOR	Kim Min-Woo
11	FW	JPN	Yohei Toyoda
12	GK	JPN	Tatsuro Okuda
13	DF	JPN	Yusuke Inuzuka
14	MF	JPN	Naoyuki Fujita

No.	Pos.	Nation	Player
15	DF	JPN	Ryuhei Niwa
16	MF	JPN	Takahiro Kuniyoshi
18	FW	JPN	Ryunosuke Noda
19	FW	JPN	Shohei Okada
20	DF	KOR	Yeo Sung-Hye
21	GK	JPN	Takuya Muro
22	FW	JPN	Kei Ikeda
23	DF	JPN	So Morita
24	DF	JPN	Kyohei Kuroki
25	MF	JPN	Ryota Hayasaka
26	DF	JPN	Tatsuya Sakai
28	MF	JPN	Yoshiki Takahashi (loan from Vegalta Sendai)
30	MF	JPN	Kohei Kuroki

== Transfers ==
In: Note: Flags indicate national team as defined under FIFA eligibility rules; some limited exceptions apply. Players may hold more than one non-FIFA nationality.

No.	Pos.	Nation	Player
4	DF	JPN	Teruaki Kobayashi (from Ventforet Kofu)
5	DF	KOR	Kim Kun-Hoan (loan from Yokohama F. Marinos)
7	MF	JPN	Keisuke Funatani (from Júbilo Iwata)
8	MF	JPN	Kota Mizunuma (loan from Yokohama F. Marinos)
9	FW	BRA	Tozin (loan from Corinthians Alagoano)
11	FW	JPN	Yohei Toyoda (from Kyoto Sanga, previously on loan)
13	MF	JPN	Yusuke Inuzuka (from Ventforet Kofu)
28	MF	JPN	Yoshiki Takahashi (loan from Vegalta Sendai)

Out: Note: Flags indicate national team as defined under FIFA eligibility rules; some limited exceptions apply. Players may hold more than one non-FIFA nationality.

No.	Pos.	Nation	Player
4	MF	JPN	Terukazu Tanaka (loan return to Yokohama FC)
5	DF	PRK	Kim Myung-Hwi
7	MF	JPN	Yukihiro Yamase (to Kataller Toyama)
8	MF	JPN	Ryota Nagata (to Montedio Yamagata)
11	FW	JPN	Tatsunori Arai
18	FW	JPN	Hiroki Bandai (to Montedio Yamagata, previously on loan to Thespakusatsu Gunma)
24	DF	JPN	Jun Yanagisawa

== Competitions ==
=== J.League ===
==== Results summary ====
Overall								Home						Away					
Pld	W	D	L	GF	GA	GD	Pts	W	D	L	GF	GA	GD	W	D	L	GF	GA	GD
34	15	8	11	48	40	+8	53	11	3	3	26	14	+12	4	5	8	22	26	−4

Last updated: 3 December 2012.
Source: World-Football.net

==== Results by round ====
Round	1	2	3	4	5	6	7	8	9	10	11	12	13	14	15	16	17	18	19	20	21	22	23	24	25	26	27	28	29	30	31	32	33	34
Ground	H	A	H	H	A	H	H	A	H	A	H	A	A	H	A	H	A	H	A	H	A	H	A	H	A	H	A	A	H	A	H	A	H	A
Result	D	L	W	W	L	W	W	D	D	D	D	L	W	L	D	W	L	W	D	W	W	L	D	W	L	W	L	L	L	W	W	W	W	L
Position	5	5	5	5	5	5	5	5	5	5	8	8	6	8	10	9	10	8	9	6	6	7	7	5	7	5	5	8	9	8	7	5	3	5

Updated to match(es) played on 3 December 2012. Source: "World-Football.net". Archived from the original on 2013-05-27.
A = Away; H = Home; W = Win; D = Draw; L = Loss

==== Matches ====
10 March 2012 1	Sagan Tosu	0 – 0	Cerezo Osaka	Best Amenity Stadium
Saturday 14:05		Report		Attendance: 11,283; Referee: Inoue

17 March 2012 2	Júbilo Iwata	2 – 1	Sagan Tosu	Yamaha Stadium
Saturday 17:04	Yamada 27'; Komano 34'	Report	17' Toyoda	Attendance: 10,653; Referee: Takayama

24 March 2012 3	Sagan Tosu	1 – 0	Yokohama F. Marinos	Best Amenity Stadium
Saturday 15:04	Mizunuma 77'	Report		Attendance: 10,611; Referee: Maeda

31 March 2012 4	Sagan Tosu	3 – 0	Vissel Kobe	Best Amenity Stadium
Saturday 19:04	Noda 28'; Toyoda 43'; Ikeda 90+5'	Report		Attendance: 7,719; Referee: Matsumura

7 April 2012 5	Nagoya Grampus	1 – 0	Sagan Tosu	Toyota Stadium
	Nagai 27'	Summary		Attendance: 13,824

14 April 2012 6	Sagan Tosu	1 – 0	Sanfrecce Hiroshima	Best Amenity Stadium
	Mizunuma 39'	Report		Attendance: 9,735

21 April 2012 7	Sagan Tosu	1 – 0	Albirex Niigata	Best Amenity Stadium
	Tozin 81'	Report		Attendance: 5,432

28 April 2012 8	Kashiwa Reysol	1 – 1	Sagan Tosu	Hitachi Kashiwa Soccer Stadium
	Kitajima 45+1'	Report	Kobayashi 70'	Attendance: 10,351

3 May 2012 9	Sagan Tosu	1 – 1	Vegalta Sendai	Best Amenity Stadium
	Toyoda 57'	Report	Tomita 19'	Attendance: 18,113

6 May 2012 10	Kashima Antlers	0 – 0	Sagan Tosu	Kashima Soccer Stadium
		Report		Attendance: 10,626

12 May 2012 11	Sagan Tosu	1 – 1	Omiya Ardija	Best Amenity Stadium
	Hasegawa 90' (o.g.)	Report	Aoki 82'	Attendance: 7,833

19 May 2012 12	F.C. Tokyo	3 – 2	Sagan Tosu	Ajinomoto Stadium
	Watanabe 75', 81', 88'	Report	Mizunuma 42'; Toyoda 60'	Attendance: 25,803

25 May 2012 13	Gamba Osaka	2 – 3	Sagan Tosu	Osaka Expo '70 Stadium
	Futagawa 3'; Sato 67'	Report	Toyoda 68'; Fujita 86', 90+4'	Attendance: 8,218

16 June 2012 14	Sagan Tosu	0 – 1	Kawasaki Frontale	Best Amenity Stadium
		Report	Tasaka 79'	Attendance: 9,603

23 June 2012 15	Shimizu S-Pulse	1 – 1	Sagan Tosu	Outsourcing Stadium Nihondaira
	Omae 26' (pen.)	Report	Ikeda 57'	Attendance: 17,696

30 June 2012 16	Sagan Tosu	1 – 0	Consadole Sapporo	Best Amenity Stadium
	Mizunuma 90+5'	Report		Attendance: 10,345

7 July 2012 17	Urawa Red Diamonds	4 – 3	Sagan Tosu	Saitama Stadium 2002
	Umesaki 7'; Hirakawa 50'; Haraguchi 52', 54'	Report	Tozin 67'; Fujita 67', 71'	Attendance: 30,047

14 July 2012 18	Sagan Tosu	1 – 0	Tokyo	Best Amenity Stadium
	Tozin 87'	Report		Attendance: 13,891

28 July 2012 19	Vegalta Sendai	1 – 1	Sagan Tosu	Yurtec Stadium Sendai
19:30 JST	Akamine 29'; Wilson (yellow card) 67'; Yanagisawa (yellow card) 90+2'	Report	Toyoda 14'; Isozaki (yellow card) 62'; Okamoto (yellow card) 81'; Yeo Sung-Hye (yellow card) 90+8'	Attendance: 14,611; Referee: (Japan) Masaaki Iemoto

4 August 2012 20	Sagan Tosu	2 – 0	Kashima Antlers	Best Amenity Stadium
20:00 JST	Mizunuma 23'; Toyoda 61'	Report		Attendance: 12,844

11 August 2012 21	Kawasaki Frontale	1 – 2	Sagan Tosu	Todoroki Athletics Stadium
20:00 JST	Nakamura 19'	Report	Saneto 55' (o.g.); Toyoda 57'	Attendance: 12,509

18 August 2012 22	Sagan Tosu	0 – 1	Shimizu S-Pulse	Best Amenity Stadium
19:00 JST		Report	Muramatsu 65'	Attendance: 11,933

25 August 2012 23	Vissel Kobe	0 – 0	Sagan Tosu	Home's Stadium Kobe
19:00 JST		Summary		Attendance: 13,471

1 September 2012 24	Sagan Tosu	4 – 1	Gamba Osaka	Best Amenity Stadium
19:00 JST	Fujita 1'; Toyoda 45', 52'; Kuniyoshi 89'	Report	Myojin 74'	Attendance: 19,729; Referee: Hiroyuki Kimura

15 September 2012 25	Omiya Ardija	1 – 0	Sagan Tosu	NACK5 Stadium Omiya
19:30	Kikuchi 65'	Summary		Attendance: 10,012

22 September 2012 26	Sagan Tosu	3 – 1	Kashiwa Reysol	Best Amenity Stadium
19:00 JST	Sung-Hye 43'; Fujita 45+1'; Min-Woo 53'	Summary	Leandro Domingues 66'	Attendance: 12,651; Referee: Toshimitsu Yoshida

29 September 2012 27	Sanfrecce Hiroshima	4 – 1	Sagan Tosu	Hiroshima Big Arch
13:30 JST	Shimizu 30'; Satō 34' (pen.), 90+5'; Kōji Morisaki 58'	Report	Toyoda 90+2'	Attendance: 15,463; Referee: Hajime Matsuo

6 October 2012 28	Cerezo Osaka	3 – 2	Sagan Tosu	Kincho Stadium
13:00 JST	Kakitani 27', 86'; 76' (o.g.)	Report	Kim Min-Woo 20'; Toyoda 70'	Attendance: 10,013; Referee: Yuichi Nishimura

20 October 2012 29	Sagan Tosu	1 – 3	Nagoya Grampus	Tosu Stadium
15:00 JST (UTC+9)	Noda 90+5'	Report	Nagai 45+3'; Córdoba 67'; Tulio 90'	Attendance: 11,851; Referee: Masaaki Toma

27 October 2012 30	Albirex Niigata	0 – 2	Sagan Tosu	Niigata Stadium Big Swan
18:00 JST (UTC+9)		Report	Toyoda 3', 38'	Attendance: 23,254; Referee: Hiroyoshi Takayama

7 November 2012 31	Sagan Tosu	3 – 2	Júbilo Iwata	Tosu Stadium
19:00 JST (UTC+9)	Kun-Hoan 41'; Toyoda 41', 59'	Report	Yamada 77'; Kanazono 89'	Attendance: 8,155; Referee: Nobutsugu Murakami

17 November 2012 32	Consadole Sapporo	2 – 3	Sagan Tosu	Sapporo Dome
17:00 JST (UTC+9)	Uchimura 45+1'; Haga 56'	Report	Toyoda 54'; Ikeda 67'; Noda 71'	Attendance: 10,266; Referee: Takuya Maeda

24 November 2012 33	Sagan Tosu	3 – 1	Urawa Red Diamonds	Tosu Stadium
14:30 JST (UTC+9)	Toyoda 45', 78'; Noda	Report	Umesaki 58'	Attendance: 22,116; Referee: Toshimitsu Yoshida

1 December 2012 34	Yokohama F. Marinos	1 – 0	Sagan Tosu	Nissan Stadium
15:30 JST (UTC+9)	Nakamura 53'	Report		Attendance: 26,642; Referee: Yoshiro Imamura

==== League table ====
Pos	Team	Pld	W	D	L	GF	GA	GD	Pts	Qualification or relegation
1	Sanfrecce Hiroshima (C)	34	19	7	8	63	34	+29	64	Qualification to 2012 Club World Cup and 2013 Champions League
2	Vegalta Sendai	34	15	12	7	59	43	+16	57	Qualification to 2013 Champions League (Note: The winners of the 2012 Emperor's Cup qualified for the group stage of the 2013 AFC Champions League.)
3	Urawa Red Diamonds	34	15	10	9	47	42	+5	55	Qualification to 2013 Champions League
4	Yokohama F. Marinos	34	13	14	7	44	33	+11	53	
5	Sagan Tosu	34	15	8	11	48	39	+9	53	
6	Kashiwa Reysol	34	15	7	12	57	52	+5	52	Qualification to 2013 Champions League
7	Nagoya Grampus	34	15	7	12	46	47	−1	52	
8	Kawasaki Frontale	34	14	8	12	51	50	+1	50	
9	Shimizu S-Pulse	34	14	7	13	39	40	−1	49	
10	FC Tokyo	34	14	6	14	47	44	+3	48	
11	Kashima Antlers	34	12	10	12	50	43	+7	46	
12	Júbilo Iwata	34	13	7	14	57	53	+4	46	
13	Omiya Ardija	34	11	11	12	38	45	−7	44	
14	Cerezo Osaka	34	11	9	14	47	53	−6	42	
15	Albirex Niigata	34	10	10	14	29	34	−5	40	
16	Vissel Kobe (R)	34	11	6	17	41	50	−9	39	Relegation to 2013 J.League Division 2
17	Gamba Osaka (R)	34	9	11	14	67	65	+2	38	Relegation to 2013 J.League Division 2
18	Consadole Sapporo (R)	34	4	2	28	25	88	−63	14	Relegation to 2013 J.League Division 2

Updated to match(es) played on 1 December 2012. Source: J.League Division 1
Rules for classification: 1) points; 2) goal difference; 3) number of goals scored.
(C) Champions; (R) Relegated

=== J.League Cup ===
20 March 2012 Group A	Sagan Tosu	2 – 1	Kawasaki Frontale	Best Amenity Stadium
Tuesday 16:04	Okada 53'; Noda 65'	Report	78' Yajima	Attendance: 4,613; Referee: Tojo

4 April 2012 Group A	Vegalta Sendai	2 – 0	Sagan Tosu	Yurtec Stadium Sendai
	Matsushita 51'; Kakuda 62'	Report; Summary		Attendance: 7,236; Referee: Yoshida

16 May 2012 Group A	Sagan Tosu	3 – 2	Júbilo Iwata	Best Amenity Stadium
Wednesday 19:04	Inuzuka 12', 65'; Hayasaka 62'	Report; Summary	Matsuoka 52'; Yamada 88'	Attendance: 4,642; Referee: Sato

6 June 2012 Group A	Sagan Tosu	2 – 1	Urawa Red Diamonds	Best Amenity Stadium
11:00 UTC+8	Toyoda 52'; Mizunuma 80'	[ Report] Summary	Marcio Richardes 77'	Attendance: 7,284; Referee: Kimura

9 June 2012 Group A	Sanfrecce Hiroshima	5 – 1	Sagan Tosu	Hiroshima Big Arch
08:00 UTC+8	Koji Morisaki 45+3', 90'; Satō 55' (pen.); Ishihara 78', 82'	[ Report] Summary	Mizunuma 63'	Attendance: 10,132; Referee: Murakami

27 June 2012 Group A	Cerezo Osaka	5 – 0	Sagan Tosu	Nagai Ball Gall Field
11:00 UTC+8	Ogihara 24'; Kim Bo-Kyung 45+4' (pen.); Kakitani 55', 71'; Fujimoto 90'	Summary	Noda (yellow card) 16' (yellow-red card) 30'; Akahoshi (red card) 44'	Attendance: 7,280

==== Group A ====
Team	Pld	W	D	L	GF	GA	GD	Pts
Cerezo Osaka	6	4	0	2	15	7	+8	12
Vegalta Sendai	6	4	0	2	11	5	+4	12
Júbilo Iwata	6	4	0	2	10	11	−1	12
Urawa Red Diamonds	6	3	0	3	12	10	+2	9
Sagan Tosu	6	3	0	3	8	16	−8	9
Sanfrecce Hiroshima	6	1	1	4	8	11	−3	4
Kawasaki Frontale	6	1	1	4	7	11	−4	4

=== Emperor's Cup ===
9 September 2012 Second round	Sagan Tosu	0 – 1	Kamatamare Sanuki	Tosu, Saga
13:00 JST (UTC+9)		Report	Nishino 90+2'	Stadium: Tosu Stadium

== Squad statistics ==
=== Appearances and goals ===
No.	Pos	Nat	Player	Total		J-League		J-League Cup		Emperor's Cup	
No.	Pos	Nat	Player	Apps	Goals	Apps	Goals	Apps	Goals	Apps	Goals
1	GK	(Japan) JPN	Taku Akahoshi	33	0	27+0	0	5+0	0	1+0	0
2	DF	(Japan) JPN	Kosuke Kitani	4	0	2+2	0	0+0	0	0+0	0
3	DF	(Japan) JPN	Keita Isozaki	28	0	19+4	0	4+0	0	1+0	0
4	DF	(Japan) JPN	Teruaki Kobayashi	25	1	16+7	1	2+0	0	0+0	0
5	DF	(South Korea) KOR	Kim Kun-Hoan	34	1	27+1	1	4+1	0	1+0	0
6	MF	(Japan) JPN	Tomotaka Okamoto	28	0	22+1	0	4+0	0	1+0	0
7	MF	(Japan) JPN	Keisuke Funatani	2	0	0+2	0	0+0	0	0+0	0
8	MF	(Japan) JPN	Kota Mizunuma	36	8	26+5	5	2+2	3	1+0	0
9	FW	(Brazil) BRA	Tozin	28	3	4+18	3	5+0	0	0+1	0
10	MF	(South Korea) KOR	Kim Min-Woo	33	1	28+0	1	2+2	0	1+0	0
11	FW	(Japan) JPN	Yohei Toyoda	33	17	30+0	16	1+1	1	1+0	0
12	GK	(Japan) JPN	Tatsuro Okuda	7	0	4+1	0	1+1	0	0+0	0
13	DF	(Japan) JPN	Yusuke Inuzuka	10	2	1+4	0	5+0	2	0+0	0
14	MF	(Japan) JPN	Naoyuki Fujita	35	5	30+0	5	4+0	0	1+0	0
15	DF	(Japan) JPN	Ryuhei Niwa	31	0	29+0	0	1+0	0	1+0	0
16	MF	(Japan) JPN	Takahiro Kuniyoshi	6	0	0+0	0	4+2	0	0+0	0
18	FW	(Japan) JPN	Ryunosuke Noda	22	5	9+7	4	5+0	1	0+1	0
19	FW	(Japan) JPN	Shohei Okada	20	1	0+17	0	2+1	1	0+0	0
20	DF	(South Korea) KOR	Yeo Sung-Hye	30	1	24+0	1	4+1	0	1+0	0
21	GK	(Japan) JPN	Takuya Muro	0	0	0+0	0	0+0	0	0+0	0
22	FW	(Japan) JPN	Kei Ikeda	25	3	23+1	3	1+0	0	0+0	0
23	DF	(Japan) JPN	So Morita	1	0	0+0	0	1+0	0	0+0	0
24	DF	(Japan) JPN	Kyohei Kuroki	3	0	0+0	0	1+2	0	0+0	0
25	MF	(Japan) JPN	Ryota Hayasaka	22	1	9+9	0	2+1	1	1+0	0
26	DF	(Japan) JPN	Tatsuya Sakai	6	0	1+1	0	4+0	0	0+0	0
27	MF	(Japan) JPN	Koki Kiyotake	3	0	0+2	0	1+0	0	0+0	0
28	MF	(Japan) JPN	Yoshiki Takahashi	16	0	10+4	0	0+1	0	0+1	0
29	DF	(Japan) JPN	Shohei Kishida	1	0	1+0	0	0+0	0	0+0	0
30	MF	(Japan) JPN	Kohei Kuroki	5	0	0+3	0	2+0	0	0+0	0
Players who appeared for Sagan Tosu no longer at the club:

=== Top scorers ===
Place	Position	Nation	Number	Name	J-League	J-League Cup	Emperor's Cup	Total
1	FW	(Japan)	11	Yohei Toyoda	16	1	0	17
2	MF	(Japan)	8	Kota Mizunuma	5	3	0	8
3	MF	(Japan)	14	Naoyuki Fujita	5	0	0	5
3	FW	(Japan)	18	Ryunosuke Noda	4	1	0	5
5	FW	(Brazil)	9	Tozin	3	0	0	3
5	FW	(Japan)	22	Kei Ikeda	3	0	0	3
7	DF	(Japan)	13	Yusuke Inuzuka	0	2	0	2
8	DF	(Japan)	4	Teruaki Kobayashi	1	0	0	1
8	MF	(South Korea)	10	Kim Min-Woo	1	0	0	1
8	DF	(South Korea)	20	Yeo Sung-Hye	1	0	0	1
8	DF	(South Korea)	5	Kim Kun-Hoan	1	0	0	1
8				Own goal	0	1	0	1
8	FW	(Japan)	19	Shohei Okada	0	1	0	1
8	MF	(Japan)	25	Ryota Hayasaka	0	1	0	1
				TOTALS	40	5	0	45

=== Disciplinary record ===
Number	Nation	Position	Name	J-League		J.League Cup		Emperor's Cup		Total	
Number	Nation	Position	Name	Yellow card	Red card	Yellow card	Red card	Yellow card	Red card	Yellow card	Red card
1	(Japan)	GK	Taku Akahoshi	1	0	1	1	0	0	2	1
2	(Japan)	DF	Kosuke Kitani	1	0	0	0	0	0	1	0
3	(Japan)	DF	Keita Isozaki	2	0	1	0	0	0	3	0
4	(Japan)	DF	Teruaki Kobayashi	4	0	0	0	0	0	4	0
5	(South Korea)	DF	Kim Kun-Hoan	2	0	0	0	0	0	2	0
6	(Japan)	MF	Tomotaka Okamoto	4	0	0	0	0	0	4	0
8	(Japan)	MF	Kota Mizunuma	1	0	0	0	0	0	1	0
9	(Brazil)	FW	Tozim	2	0	3	0	0	0	5	0
10	(South Korea)	MF	Kim Min-Woo	7	0	0	0	0	0	7	0
11	(Japan)	FW	Yohei Toyoda	6	0	1	0	0	0	7	0
12	(Japan)	GK	Tatsuro Okuda	1	0	0	0	0	0	1	0
14	(Japan)	MF	Naoyuki Fujita	3	0	1	0	0	0	4	0
15	(Japan)	DF	Ryuhei Niwa	5	0	0	0	0	0	5	0
16	(Japan)	MF	Takahiro Kuniyoshi	0	0	1	0	0	0	1	0
18	(Japan)	FW	Ryunosuke Noda	3	0	4	1	1	0	8	1
19	(Japan)	FW	Shohei Okada	2	0	0	0	0	0	2	0
20	(South Korea)	DF	Yeo Sung-Hye	7	0	1	0	0	0	8	0
22	(Japan)	FW	Kei Ikeda	2	0	0	0	0	0	2	0
27	(Japan)	MF	Koki Kiyotake	2	0	0	0	0	0	2	0
28	(Japan)	MF	Yoshiki Takahashi	1	0	0	0	0	0	1	0
			TOTALS	56	0	13	2	1	0	70	2
