= 2010 Sagan Tosu season =

Sagan Tosu
2010 season
- Manager: Ikuo Matsumoto
- Stadium: Best Amenity Stadium
- J. League 2: 9th
- Emperor's Cup: 3rd Round
- Top goalscorer: Yohei Toyoda (13)

2010 Sagan Tosu season

== Competitions ==
Competitions	Position
J. League 2	9th / 19 clubs
Emperor's Cup	3rd Round

== Player statistics ==
No.	Pos.	Player	D.o.B. (Age)	Height / Weight	J. League 2		Emperor's Cup		Total	
No.	Pos.	Player	D.o.B. (Age)	Height / Weight	Apps	Goals	Apps	Goals	Apps	Goals
1	GK	Taku Akahoshi	April 21, 1984 (aged 25)	cm / kg	20	0				
2	DF	Kosuke Kitani	October 9, 1978 (aged 31)	cm / kg	33	3				
3	DF	Keita Isozaki	November 17, 1980 (aged 29)	cm / kg	19	0				
4	FW	Hiroshi Ichihara	April 24, 1987 (aged 22)	cm / kg	0	0				
5	DF	Kazuya Iio	April 10, 1980 (aged 29)	cm / kg	15	1				
6	MF	Naoyuki Fujita	June 22, 1987 (aged 22)	cm / kg	32	4				
7	MF	Yukihiro Yamase	April 22, 1984 (aged 25)	cm / kg	21	2				
8	MF	Yu Eto	October 17, 1983 (aged 26)	cm / kg	29	3				
9	FW	Yohei Toyoda	April 11, 1985 (aged 24)	cm / kg	34	13				
10	MF	Kim Min-Woo	February 25, 1990 (aged 20)	cm / kg	24	4				
11	MF	Yosuke Nozaki	February 16, 1985 (aged 25)	cm / kg	6	0				
11	DF	Terukazu Tanaka	July 14, 1985 (aged 24)	cm / kg	11	0				
12	GK	Toshimitsu Asai	April 4, 1983 (aged 26)	cm / kg	0	0				
13	DF	Takuma Hidaka	April 8, 1983 (aged 26)	cm / kg	23	2				
14	MF	Moon Joo-Won	May 8, 1983 (aged 26)	cm / kg	2	0				
14	MF	Park Jung-Soo	January 13, 1987 (aged 23)	cm / kg	10	0				
15	DF	Ryuhei Niwa	January 13, 1986 (aged 24)	cm / kg	33	0				
16	GK	Shinichi Shuto	June 8, 1983 (aged 26)	cm / kg	0	0				
18	FW	Hiroki Bandai	February 19, 1986 (aged 24)	cm / kg	26	2				
19	MF	Hirokazu Hasegawa	October 20, 1986 (aged 23)	cm / kg	16	1				
20	DF	Yeo Sung-Hye	August 6, 1987 (aged 22)	cm / kg	25	0				
21	GK	Takuya Muro	November 2, 1982 (aged 27)	cm / kg	17	0				
22	FW	Kei Ikeda	October 20, 1986 (aged 23)	cm / kg	24	1				
23	MF	Sho Shimoji	August 2, 1985 (aged 24)	cm / kg	14	1				
24	MF	Jun Yanagisawa	June 27, 1987 (aged 22)	cm / kg	10	0				
25	MF	Ryota Hayasaka	September 19, 1985 (aged 24)	cm / kg	36	4				
26	FW	Kenzo Taniguchi	December 22, 1988 (aged 21)	cm / kg	0	0				
29	DF	So Morita	May 14, 1992 (aged 17)	cm / kg	1	0				
30	MF	Kohei Kuroki	July 31, 1989 (aged 20)	cm / kg	7	0				
31	DF	Tsukasa Morimoto	June 24, 1988 (aged 21)	cm / kg	3	0				
32	FW	Ryunosuke Noda	September 28, 1988 (aged 21)	cm / kg	7	0				
34	MF	Kim Ho-Nam	June 14, 1989 (aged 20)	cm / kg	4	0				

== Other pages ==
- (in Japanese) J. League official site
