= 2010 Emperor's Cup =

Tournament details
- Country: Japan
- Teams: 88

Final positions
- Champions: Kashima Antlers (4th title)
- Runners-up: Shimizu S-Pulse

Tournament statistics
- Matches played: 87
- Goals scored: 346 (3.98 per match)
- Top goal scorer(s): Adriano, Neto (5 goals)

The 90th Emperor's Cup (第90回天皇杯) began on 4 September 2010 and ended on 1 January 2011 with the final at National Stadium in Tokyo, Japan. Gamba Osaka were the two-time defending champions, having won two previous tournaments.

Kashima Antlers won the tournament and was awarded a 2011 AFC Champions League berth.

== Calendar ==
Round	Date	Matches	Clubs	New entries this round
First round	September 3	24	48 → 24	47 Prefectural Qualifying Cup winners; 1 University Qualifying Cup winning club
Second round	September 5	32	24+18+19+3 → 32	18 J1 clubs; 19 J2 clubs; 3 JFL seeded clubs
Third round	October 9, 11, 13	16	32 → 16	
Fourth Round	November 17	8	16 → 8	
Quarterfinals	December 25	4	8 → 4	
Semifinals	December 29	2	4 → 2	
Final	January 1, 2011	1	2 → 1	

== Participants ==
=== Starting in the first round ===
Prefectural finals winners – 47 teams

- Hokkaidō – Sapporo University
- Aomori – Vanraure Hachinohe
- Iwate – Grulla Morioka
- Miyagi – Sony Sendai
- Akita – Blaublitz Akita
- Yamagata – Yamagata University
- Fukushima – Fukushima United
- Ibaraki – Ryutsu Keizai University
- Tochigi – Tochigi Uva
- Gunma – Arte Takasaki
- Saitama – Tokyo International University
- Chiba – Juntendo University
- Tokyo – Tokyo Verdy U-18
- Kanagawa – YSCC Yokohama
- Niigata – Japan Soccer College
- Toyama – Toyama Shinjo Club
- Ishikawa – Zweigen Kanazawa
- Fukui – Saurcos Fukui
- Yamanashi – Tamaho FC
- Nagano – Matsumoto Yamaga
- Gifu – FC Gifu Second
- Shizuoka – Honda FC
- Aichi – Chukyo University
- Mie – Yokkaichi University
- Shiga – MIO Biwako Shiga
- Kyoto – SP Kyoto
- Osaka – Osaka University of Health and Sport Sciences
- Hyōgo – Kwansei Gakuin University
- Nara – Nara Club
- Wakayama – Arterivo Wakayama
- Tottori – Yonago Kita High School
- Shimane – Dezzolla Shimane
- Okayama – International Pacific University
- Hiroshima – Sagawa Express Chugoku
- Yamaguchi – Renofa Yamaguchi
- Tokushima – Tokushima Vortis Second
- Kagawa – Kamatamare Sanuki
- Ehime – Ehime FC Shimanami
- Kochi – Kochi University
- Fukuoka – Fukuoka University of Education
- Saga – Saga University
- Nagasaki – V-Varen Nagasaki
- Kumamoto – Kumamoto Gakuen University High School
- Ōita – HOYO Atletico ELAN
- Miyazaki – Honda Lock
- Kagoshima – NIFS Kanoya
- Okinawa – FC Ryukyu

Prime Minister Cup University football tournament winners – 1 team

- Komazawa University

=== Starting in the second round ===
J.League Division 1 – 18 teams

- Vegalta Sendai
- Montedio Yamagata
- Kashima Antlers
- Omiya Ardija
- Urawa Red Diamonds
- FC Tokyo
- Kawasaki Frontale
- Yokohama F. Marinos
- Shonan Bellmare
- Shimizu S-Pulse
- Júbilo Iwata
- Nagoya Grampus
- Albirex Niigata
- Kyoto Sanga
- Cerezo Osaka
- Gamba Osaka
- Vissel Kobe
- Sanfrecce Hiroshima

J.League Division 2 – 19 teams

- Consadole Sapporo
- Mito HollyHock
- Tochigi SC
- Thespa Kusatsu
- Kashiwa Reysol
- JEF United Chiba
- Tokyo Verdy
- Yokohama FC
- Ventforet Kofu
- Kataller Toyama
- FC Gifu
- Fagiano Okayama
- Tokushima Vortis
- Ehime FC
- Giravanz Kitakyushu
- Avispa Fukuoka
- Sagan Tosu
- Roasso Kumamoto
- Oita Trinita

Japan Football League – 3 teams

- Gainare Tottori
- Sagawa Shiga
- Machida Zelvia

※Clubs ranked from first to third at the end of the 17th week of 2010 Japan Football League.

== Times ==
All times are Japan Standard Time (UTC+09:00)

== First round ==
2010-09-03
19:00

Ryutsu Keizai University	0–1	Arte Takasaki
	Report	Koshiba 90'

Kasamatsu Stadium, Naka
Attendance: 513
Referee: Toshihito Fujita

2010-09-03
14:00

Fukushima United	2–3 (a.e.t.)	Sony Sendai
J. Shimizu 21'; Murase 45'	Report	G. Okubo 70', 81' (pen.); Otaki 96'

J-Village Stadium, Naraha
Attendance: 348
Referee: Toshiyuki Wazumi

2010-09-03
19:00

Saurcos Fukui	0–2	Toyama Shinjo Club
	Report	Kanamaru 70'; Kageyama 87'

Technoport Fukui Stadium, Fukui
Attendance: 417
Referee: Keita Fujimoto

2010-09-03
19:00

Zweigen Kanazawa	3–0	Japan Soccer College
Moroe 67'; Furube 88'; Hayashi 88'	Report

Ishikawa Prefectural Stadium, Kanazawa
Attendance: 653
Referee: Ippei Ōtomo

2010-09-03
19:00

Yokkaichi University	1–5	Chukyo University
Suzuki 55'	Report	Kato 17'; Mas. Yoshida 35'; Fujimaki 60', 90+1'; Hoshino 74'

Suzuka Sports Garden, Suzuka
Attendance: 374
Referee: Shoji Akisawa

2010-09-03
13:00

Sapporo University	2–3	Grulla Morioka
Kaneda 42'; 90+2' (o.g.)	Report	Kaneko 30'; Y. Nakata 77', 90'

Sapporo Atsubetsu Park Stadium, Sapporo
Attendance: 191
Referee: Takayuki Sato

2010-09-03
19:00

Sagawa Express Chugoku	2–3	Dezzolla Shimane
Saiki 34'; Junji Ueda 72'	Report	T. Shimizu 20'; Shoji 22'; Fumiyasu 62'

Fukuyama Sports Park Athletics Stadium, Fukuyama
Attendance: 914
Referee: Yuki Noda

2010-09-03
15:00

Kamatamare Sanuki	1–1 (a.e.t.)	Kochi University
Ōnishi 60'	Report	Fukumoto 90+1'
Penalties
Kanzaki (penalty scored); Kudamatsu (penalty scored); Onishi (penalty scored); K. Nakajima (penalty scored); Wakisaka (penalty scored)	5–4	(penalty scored) Saneto; (penalty scored) Sakai; (penalty scored) Yamabe; (penalty missed) Akagi; (penalty scored) Nishiyama

Kumagaya Athletic Stadium, Kumagaya
Attendance: 175
Referee: Kazuya Fujita

2010-09-03
15:00

HOYO Atletico ELAN	1–2	Honda Lock
T. Hasegawa 6'	Report	Maeda 76'; Kumamoto 90+3'

Ōita Sports Park Rugby Field, Ōita
Attendance: 228
Referee: Yosuke Takebe

2010-09-03
19:00

Tokyo Verdy U-18	0–1	Komazawa University
	Report	Ōtsuka 77'

Nishigaoka National Stadium, Kita
Attendance: 1,755
Referee: Tomohiro Tsukada

2010-09-03
18:00

SP Kyoto	3–1	Nara Club
Adachi 4'; Nakasugi 21'; Hamaya 90+3'	Report	Hiyama 90+4'

Nishikyogoku Athletic Stadium, Ukyō-ku, Kyoto
Attendance: 365
Referee: Koichiro Fukushima

2010-09-03
13:00

FC Ryukyu	3–1	Tokushima Vortis Second
K. Tanaka 12'; Matsuda 53'; Ito 66'	Report	Takada 73'

Narashino Akitsu Park Soccer Stadium, Narashino
Attendance: 262
Referee: Kazuo Takeda

2010-09-03
19:00

YSCC Yokohama	0–3	National Institute of Fitness and Sports in Kanoya
	Report	Shirota 27'; Momoi 60'; Ōyama 87'

Hiratsuka Athletics Stadium, Hiratsuka
Attendance: 702
Referee: Jun Sasazawa

2010-09-03
19:00

Yamagata University	1–6	Blaublitz Akita
Sato 38'	Report	Yokoyama 1', 62'; Fukazawa 5'; Ka. Sato 22'; Togashi 43'; Maeyama 75'

ND Stadium, Tendō
Attendance: 452
Referee: Koei Koya

2010-09-03
16:00

Renofa Yamaguchi	2–0	Yonago Kita High School
Nakagawa 8'; Kashihara 61'	Report

Hiratsuka Athletics Stadium, Hiratsuka
Attendance: 225
Referee: Ryo Hirama

2010-09-03
19:00

Honda FC	7–2	FC Gifu Second
Iga 12', 64'; K. Suzuki 14'; N. Nishi 24'; Y. Nakamura 63' (pen.); Nitta 77', 86'	Report	Matsue 31', 53'

Kusanagi Sports Ground, Shimizu-ku, Shizuoka
Attendance: 322
Referee: Kenta Aoyama

2010-09-03
16:00

V-Varen Nagasaki	4–0	International Pacific University
Densho 49'; Yu. Sato 62', 82'; H. Abe 90+3'	Report

Kasamatsu Stadium, Naka
Attendance: 185
Referee: Takao Onshi

2010-09-03
18:00

Saga University	2–2 (a.e.t.)	Kumamoto Gakuen University High School
Kotsubo 16'; Kushima 86'	Report	57' (o.g.); Mizoguchi 66'
Penalties
Kuroki (penalty scored); Yamanaka (penalty scored); Inoue (penalty missed); Nakauchida (penalty scored); Komiyama (penalty missed); Maruno (penalty scored); Arimura (penalty scored); Yamamoto (penalty scored); Kushima (penalty missed); Matsumoto (penalty missed)	6–7	(penalty scored) Sakamoto; (penalty scored) Ueda; (penalty missed) Nishiwaki; (penalty missed) Hashimoto; (penalty scored) Mizoguchi; (penalty scored) Nakamichi; (penalty scored) Sakanashi; (penalty scored) Matsumoto; (penalty missed) Murakami; (penalty scored) Nakajima

Saga Stadium, Saga
Attendance: 613
Referee: Hironobu Kikawada

2010-09-03
19:00

Arterivo Wakayama	3–8	Osaka University of Health and Sport Sciences
Tasaki 11'; Shibasaki 83'; Matsushita 87'	Report	Kawanishi 30', 38', 46', 61'; Aikawa 43'; Yamamoto 63'; Murata 70', 73'

Kincho Stadium, Osaka
Attendance: 705
Referee: Mitsuharu Taketa

2010-09-03
18:00

Kwansei Gakuin University	1–4	MIO Biwako Shiga
Murai 73'	Report	Sakai 11'; Onoe 52'; Kinoshita 59'; Nakahama 90'

Kakogawa Sports Park Athletic Stadium, Kakogawa
Attendance: 217
Referee: Akihiko Ikeuchi

2010-09-03
16:00

Juntendo University	5–4 (a.e.t.)	Vanraure Hachinohe
T. Okamoto 11'; Sayama 31'; Amano 34', 84'; Ichihara 114'	Report	Kazunori 9'; Yudai 57'; Syouchi 67', 69'

Narashino Akitsu Park Soccer Stadium, Narashino
Attendance: 202
Referee: Koji Morikawa

2010-09-03
18:00

Tokyo International University	3–1	Tochigi Uva
Iwai 14', 47'; Tashiro 77'	Report	Wakabayashi 55'

Kumagaya Athletic Stadium, Kumagaya
Attendance: 610
Referee: Takumi Shinoto

2010-09-03
16:00

Fukuoka University of Education	2–2 (a.e.t.)	Ehime FC Shimanami
Okumiya 61'; Nishioka 105+1'	Report	Ogasawara 64', 95'
Penalties
Nishioka (penalty scored); Soshima (penalty scored); Nakahara (penalty scored); Ogawa (penalty missed)	3–5	(penalty scored) Kin; (penalty scored) Kitamori; (penalty scored) Tanihigashi; (penalty scored) J. Kimura; (penalty scored) Inata

Kusanagi Sports Ground, Shimizu-ku, Shizuoka
Attendance: 100
Referee: Masuya Ueda

2010-09-03
19:30

Matsumoto Yamaga	7–1	Tamaho FC
Yo. Kobayashi 38', 78'; Kijima 40'; Yo. Sato 43', 54'; Imai 55'; S. Kimura 77'	Report	Nakamura 89'

Matsumoto Stadium, Matsumoto
Attendance: 3,040
Referee: Hiromichi Oka

== Second round ==
2010-09-05
18:00

Kashima Antlers	6–0	Arte Takasaki
Osako 7'; Yasushi Endo 18'; R. Sasaki 37', 60'; Motoyama 45'; K. Nakata 53'	Report

Kashima Soccer Stadium, Kashima
Attendance: 3,575
Referee: Yudai Yamamoto

2010-09-05
17:00

Roasso Kumamoto	2–1	Ehime FC
Matsuhashi 23', 30'	Report	Sugiura 71'

KKWing Stadium, Kumamoto
Attendance: 2,727
Referee: Ryoichi Imamura

2010-09-05
19:00

Vegalta Sendai	0–1 (a.e.t.)	Sony Sendai
	Report	Kirita 106'

Yurtec Stadium, Sendai
Attendance: 4,649
Referee: Minoru Toujou

2010-09-05
18:00

Toyama Shinjo Club	0–7	Cerezo Osaka
	Report	D. Takahashi 18'; Maruhashi 39'; Nagai 41', 83'; Adriano 45+2', 59'; Bando 71' (pen.)

Kincho Stadium, Osaka
Attendance: 2,789
Referee: Jumpei Iida

2010-09-05
18:00

Albirex Niigata	3–0	Zweigen Kanazawa
Márcio Richardes 53', 90+2'; D. Suzuki 86'	Report

Niigata Stadium, Niigata
Attendance: 5,664
Referee: Masayoshi Okada

2010-09-05
19:00

Machida Zelvia	1–0	Tokyo Verdy
Yamakoshi 73'	Report

Nishigaoka National Stadium, Kita
Attendance: 3,231
Referee: Futoshi Nakamura

2010-09-05
17:00

Nagoya Grampus	3–0	Chukyo University
Burzanović 22'; Magnum 25'; Tamada 40'	Report

Suzuka Sports Garden, Suzuka
Attendance: 4,807
Referee: Nobutsugu Murakami

2010-09-05
13:00

Consadole Sapporo	4–1	Grulla Morioka
Y. Okamoto 20', 45'; Sunakawa 55'; Kondo 79'	Report	Ichimura 90'

Sapporo Atsubetsu Park Stadium, Sapporo
Attendance: 2,776
Referee: Tomohiro Tsukada

2010-09-05
18:00

Sanfrecce Hiroshima	4–0	Dezzolla Shimane
Moriwaki 41'; Yokotake 45+1'; Kuwada 53'; Mikić 56'	Report

Fukuyama Sports Park Athletics Stadium, Fukuyama
Attendance: 4,573
Referee: Ryuji Sato

2010-09-05
18:00

Fagiano Okayama	2–3	Avispa Fukuoka
Lee Dong-Myung 25'; Tadokoro 33'	Report	H. Okamoto 58'; Jogo 64'; Nakamachi 90+2' (pen.)

kanko Stadium, Okayama
Attendance: 3,038
Referee: Akihiko Ikeuchi

2010-09-05
17:00

Omiya Ardija	4–1	Kamatamare Sanuki
Lee Chun-Soo 13', 39'; Kanazawa 26'; Rafael 84'	Report	Okamoto 87'

NACK5 Stadium, Ōmiya-ku, Saitama
Attendance: 2,208
Referee: Hiroyoshi Tokayama

2010-09-05
15:00

Oita Trinita	3–2	Honda Lock
Higashi 11'; Inoue 33'; Kawahara 34'	Report	Suwazono 4'; Maeda 22'

Ōita Municipal Stadium, Ōita
Attendance: 2,154
Referee: Koichiro Fukushima

2010-09-05
15:00

Thespa Kusatsu	1–3	Giravanz Kitakyushu
Alex 7' (pen.)	Report	Wellington 41'; 45+1' (o.g.); Komorida 76'

Shikishima Football Stadium, Maebashi
Attendance: 1,300
Referee: Hiromichi Oka

2010-09-05
19:00

FC Tokyo	2–0	Komazawa University
Matsushita 58'; Hirayama 73'	Report

Ajinomoto Stadium, Chōfu
Attendance: 5,155
Referee: Takuto Okabe

2010-09-05
18:00

SP Kyoto	2–3 (a.e.t.)	Kyoto Sanga
Shiozawa 9'; Kuzushima 92'	Report	Mizumoto 31'; Diego 102'; Kakuda 105+1'

Nishikyogoku Athletic Stadium, Ukyō-ku, Kyoto
Attendance: 1,838
Referee: Hajime Matsuo

2010-09-05
19:00

JEF United Chiba	3–0	FC Ryukyu
Neto 45', 89'; Kurata 90+3'	Report

Fukuda Denshi Arena, Chiba
Attendance: 3,892
Referee: Haruki Hidaka

2010-09-05
18:00

Kawasaki Frontale	4–0	National Institute of Fitness and Sports in Kanoya
Yū Kobayashi 9', 61'; Kimura 19'; Yokoyama 77'	Report

Todoroki Athletics Stadium, Kawasaki
Attendance: 4,069
Referee: Itaru Hirose

2010-09-05
18:00

Kataller Toyama	1–2	Yokohama FC
Hirano 88'	Report	Kaio 7'; Namba 38'

Toyama Athletic Recreation Park Stadium, Toyama
Attendance: 2,593
Referee: Toshihito Fujita

2010-09-05
18:00

Montedio Yamagata	3–0	Blaublitz Akita
Masuda 32'; Ota 68'; 89' (o.g.)	Report

ND Stadium, Tendō
Attendance: 3,085
Referee: Toshimitsu Yoshida

2010-09-05
19:00

Shonan Bellmare	4–0	Renofa Yamaguchi
Sakamoto 48'; Y. Abe 76'; Shimamura 83'; Mitsuhira 90+3'	Report

Hiratsuka Athletics Stadium, Hiratsuka
Attendance: 1,461
Referee: Hiroyuki Kimura

2010-09-05
19:00

Shimizu S-Pulse	2–0	Honda FC
Hara 74'; Nagasawa 90+2'	Report

Nihondaira Sports Stadium, Shimizu-ku, Shizuoka
Attendance: 3,739
Referee: Masaaki Toma

2010-09-05
16:00

Mito HollyHock	4–2	Sagawa Shiga
Owada 65'; Shimada 80'; Katayama 83'; Hozaki 90+1' (pen.)	Report	Gokyu 1'; Okamura 56'

Kasamatsu Stadium, Naka
Attendance: 1,355
Referee: Ippei Otomo

2010-09-05
19:00

Yokohama F. Marinos	3–1	V-Varen Nagasaki
K. Yamase 55', 62'; Y. Ono 75'	Report	Daisuke Kanzaki 22'

Mitsuzawa Stadium, Kanagawa-ku, Yokohama
Attendance: 3,364
Referee: Kenji Ogiya

2010-09-05
18:00

Sagan Tosu	10–0	Kumamoto Gakuen University High School
Ikeda 16', 45'; Eto 26'; Fujita 28'; Bandai 33'; Y. Yamase 66', 89'; Toyoda 67', 75', 90+2'	Report

Best Amenity Stadium, Tosu
Attendance: 1,809
Referee: Naohito Ogawa

2010-09-05
18:00

Gamba Osaka	6–2	Osaka University of Health and Sport Sciences
H. Sasaki 30'; Hirai 46'; Cho Jae-Jin 53', 55'; Dodo 79'; Shimohira 81'	Report	Mutsumi 86'; Kawanishi 89'

Osaka Expo '70 Stadium, Suita
Attendance: 2,943
Referee: Tomohiro Inoue

2010-09-05
18:00

FC Gifu	2–3	Tochigi SC
Y. Nishikawa 45+1'; Yoshimoto 65'	Report	Mizunuma 3'; Choi Kun-Sik 35'; Ricardo Lobo 38' (pen.)

Nagaragawa Stadium, Gifu
Attendance: 2,222
Referee: Yuki Noda

2010-09-05
19:00

MIO Biwako Shiga	0–2	Vissel Kobe
	Report	T. Yoshida 63'; Mogi 70'

Home's Stadium Kobe, Kobe
Attendance: 1,752
Referee: Akio Okutani

2010-09-05
18:00

Kashiwa Reysol	6–0	Juntendo University
Kondo 25'; Kudo 28'; Leandro 34' (pen.), 51'; Hayashi 39'; J. Tanaka 90'	Report

Hitachi Kashiwa Soccer Stadium, Kashiwa
Attendance: 2,969
Referee: Hiroshi Yamauchi

2010-09-05
17:00

Urawa Red Diamonds	7–0	Tokyo International University
Edmilson 17'; Ponte 30' (pen.), 45+1'; Escudero 39'; Haraguchi 48', 88'; Takasaki 72'	Report

Urawa Komaba Stadium, Urawa-ku, Saitama
Attendance: 9,701
Referee: Joji Kashihara

2010-09-05
18:30

Tokushima Vortis	2–1	Gainare Tottori
Tsuda 15'; A. Sato 54'	Report	Mio 48'

Naruto Athletic Stadium, Naruto
Attendance: 1,728
Referee: Hiroyuki Onishi

2010-09-05
19:00

Júbilo Iwata	2–1	Ehime FC Shimanami
Suganuma 77'; Arata 79'	Report	Ogasawara 81'

Yamaha Stadium, Iwata
Attendance: 1,730
Referee: Yoshiro Imamura

2010-09-05
17:00

Ventforet Kofu	1–0	Matsumoto Yamaga
Kioke 47'	Report

Kose Sports Stadium, Kōfu
Attendance: 4,562
Referee: Kenji Tsukada

== Third round ==
2010-10-09
13:00

Kashima Antlers	2–1	Roasso Kumamoto
Marquinhos 14'; Iwamasa 45+2'	Report	Fukuo 26'

Kashima Soccer Stadium, Kashima
Attendance: 3,834
Referee: Akio Okutani

2010-10-09
13:00

Sony Sendai	1–3	Cerezo Osaka
G. Okubo 31'	Report	Inui 29'; Adriano 40' (pen.), 67'

Yurtec Stadium, Sendai
Attendance: 1,366
Referee: Hiroshi Yamauchi

2010-10-09
13:00

Albirex Niigata	2–1	Machida Zelvia
A. Tanaka 23', 45+2'	Report	Ota 49'

Niigata Stadium, Niigata
Attendance: 5,645
Referee: Joji Kashihara

2010-10-09
13:00

Nagoya Grampus	2–1	Consadole Sapporo
N. Nakamura 61'; Hanai 88'	Report	Takaki 51'

Mizuho Athletic Stadium, Nagoya
Attendance: 3,087
Referee: Tadasu Hirose

2010-10-13
13:00

Sanfrecce Hiroshima	2–2 (a.e.t.)	Avispa Fukuoka
Takahagi 89'; Makino 116' (pen.)	Report	Y. Tanaka 49'; Y. Takahashi 107'
Penalties
Aoyama (penalty scored); Mikić (penalty scored); Yamagishi (penalty scored); Stoyanov (penalty scored); Makino (penalty scored); Moriwaki (penalty missed)	5–6	(penalty scored) Y. Takahashi; (penalty scored) Nakamachi; (penalty scored) T. Ōkubo; (penalty scored) S. Abe; (penalty scored) T. Nakajima; (penalty scored) Sueyoshi

Coca-Cola West Hiroshima Stadium, Hiroshima
Attendance: 3,452
Referee: Hajime Matsuo

2010-10-11
13:00

Omiya Ardija	3–0	Oita Trinita
Rafael 25', 84'; Lee Ho 29'	Report

Kumagaya Athletic Stadium, Kumagaya
Attendance: 2,493
Referee: Takuto Okabe

2010-10-11
13:00

Giravanz Kitakyushu	0–2	FC Tokyo
	Report	Ishikawa 28'; Hirayama 88'

Shikishima Stadium, Maebashi
Attendance: 2,486
Referee: Paweł Gil (Poland)

2010-10-09
13:00

Kyoto Sanga	0–4	JEF United Chiba
	Report	Neto 8', 30', 67'; Fukai 33'

Nishikyogoku Athletic Stadium, Ukyō-ku, Kyoto
Attendance: 1,646
Referee: Hiroyoshi Takayama

2010-10-13
13:00

Kawasaki Frontale	2–1 (a.e.t.)	Yokohama FC
Juninho 88'; Kusukami 110'	Report	Kukino 82'

Todoroki Athletics Stadium, Kawasaki
Attendance: 5,167
Referee: Jumpei Iida

2010-10-09
13:00

Montedio Yamagata	3–1	Shonan Bellmare
Yu Hasegawa 12'; Tashiro 14'; Miyazaki 57'	Report	Arai 82'

ND Stadium, Tendō
Attendance: 3,249
Referee: Tomohiro Inoue

2010-10-13
13:00

Shimizu S-Pulse	4–1	Mito HollyHock
Iwashita 63'; S. Ono 66' (pen.); Omae 90+1'; Hara 90+4'	Report	Ōhashi 53'

Nihondaira Sports Stadium, Shimizu-ku, Shizuoka
Attendance: 3,107
Referee: Toshimitsu Yoshida

2010-10-09
13:00

Yokohama F. Marinos	2–1	Sagan Tosu
S. Nakamura 23'; Y. Ono 59'	Report	Hayasaka 85'

Mitsuzawa Stadium, Kanagawa-ku, Yokohama
Attendance: 3,949
Referee: Minoru Tōjō

2010-10-09
13:00

Gamba Osaka	3–2	Tochigi SC
Lee Keun-Ho 53'; Hirai 83'; Otsuka 86'	Report	Takagi 13'; Funayama 38'

Osaka Expo '70 Stadium, Suita
Attendance: 2,432
Referee: Yoshiro Imamura

2010-10-11
13:00

Vissel Kobe	1–2 (a.e.t.)	Kashiwa Reysol
Y. Ōkubo 80'	Report	Leandro 37', 105'

Home's Stadium Kobe, Kobe
Attendance: 3,775
Referee: Youdai Yamamoto

2010-10-11
13:00

Urawa Red Diamonds	2–0	Tokushima Vortis
Edmilson 31' (pen.); 43' (o.g.)	Report

Urawa Komaba Stadium, Urawa-ku, Saitama
Attendance: 13,240
Referee: Ryuji Sato

2010-10-13
13:00

Júbilo Iwata	2–1	Ventforet Kofu
Suganuma 78'; K. Yamamoto 85'	Report	Hatada 76'

Yamaha Stadium, Iwata
Attendance: 2,506
Referee: Masayoshi Okada

== Fourth round ==
2010-11-17
19:00

Kashima Antlers	2–1	Cerezo Osaka
17' (o.g.); Nozawa 44'	Report	Adriano 84'

Kashima Soccer Stadium, Kashima
Attendance: 3,105
Referee: Jumpei Iida

2010-11-17
19:00

Nagoya Grampus	1–1 (a.e.t.)	Albirex Niigata
Alex Santos 7'	Report	A. Tanaka 68'
Penalties
Alex Santos (penalty scored); Y. Maki (penalty scored); Taguchi (penalty scored); K. Hashimoto (penalty scored); Isomura (penalty scored)	5–4	(penalty scored) Chiba; (penalty scored) D. Nishi; (penalty scored) Homma; (penalty missed) Kato; (penalty scored) Michael

Mizuho Athletic Stadium, Nagoya
Attendance: 3,540
Referee: Yasuro Imamura

2010-11-17
19:00

Omiya Ardija	2–2 (a.e.t.)	Avispa Fukuoka
Fujita 18'; Sugiyama 72'	Report	Son Jeong-ryung 19'; Y. Takahashi 84'
Penalties
H. Hashimoto (penalty missed); Fujita (penalty scored); M. Ichikawa (penalty scored); Ishihara (penalty missed); An Yong-Hak (penalty scored)	3–4	(penalty scored) Y. Takahashi; (penalty missed) T. Ōkubo; (penalty scored) J. Suzuki; (penalty scored) H. Okamoto; (penalty scored) S. Abe

NACK5 Stadium, Ōmiya-ku, Saitama
Attendance: 2,265
Referee: Hiroyuki Kimura

2010-11-17
19:00

FC Tokyo	2–0	JEF United Chiba
Otake 51', 59'	Report

Ajinomoto Stadium, Chōfu
Attendance: 6,403
Referee: Takuto Okabe

2010-11-17
19:00

Kawasaki Frontale	3–3 (a.e.t.)	Montedio Yamagata
Terada 45+1'; Vitor Júnior 79'; Kusukami 93'	Report	Tashiro 27'; Masuda 54'; S. Nishikawa 118'
Penalties
Juninho (penalty scored); Taniguchi (penalty missed); Vitor Júnior (penalty scored); Yajima (penalty scored); Terada (penalty scored)	4–5	(penalty scored) Masuda; (penalty scored) Akiba; (penalty scored) R. Kobayashi; (penalty scored) Tashiro; (penalty scored) Yu Hasegawa

Todoroki Athletics Stadium, Kawasaki
Attendance: 4,780
Referee: Hiroyashi Takayama

2010-11-17
19:00

Yokohama F. Marinos	0–3	Shimizu S-Pulse
	Report	Fujimoto 48'; Okazaki 72', 81'

Mitsuzawa Stadium, Kanagawa-ku, Yokohama
Attendance: 6,054
Referee: Ryuji Sato

2010-11-17
19:00

Gamba Osaka	4–1 (a.e.t.)	Kashiwa Reysol
H. Sasaki 81'; Yasuhito Endō 94' (pen.); Usami 114'; Lucas 119'	Report	Barada 50'

Osaka Expo '70 Stadium, Suita
Attendance: 3,327
Referee: Kazuyuki Hayakawa

2010-11-17
19:00

Urawa Red Diamonds	1–0	Júbilo Iwata
Edmilson 42'	Report

Saitama Stadium, Midori-ku, Saitama
Attendance: 11,129
Referee: Yudai Yamamoto

== Quarter-finals ==
2010-12-25
13:00

Kashima Antlers	2–1	Nagoya Grampus
Koroki 7'; Osako 78'	Report	Ogawa 76'

Kashima Soccer Stadium, Kashima
Attendance: 14,564
Referee: Yuichi Nishimura

2010-12-25
15:00

Avispa Fukuoka	2–3 (a.e.t.)	FC Tokyo
T. Ōkubo 13'; Niwa 118'	Report	Ishikawa 90+3', 98'; Hirayama 94'

Kumagaya Athletic Stadium, Kumagaya
Attendance: 6,553
Referee: Hiroyoshi Takayama

2010-12-25
13:00

Shimizu S-Pulse	1–1 (a.e.t.)	Montedio Yamagata
Bosnar 109'	Report	Tashiro 107'
Penalties
Hyodo (penalty scored); Iwashita (penalty scored); D. Ichikawa (penalty scored); Johnsen (penalty scored); Okazaki (penalty scored)	5–4	(penalty scored) Masuda; (penalty missed) Ke. Sato; (penalty scored) R. Kobayashi; (penalty scored) Shimomura; (penalty scored) Tashiro

Nihondaira Sports Stadium, Shimizu-ku, Shizuoka
Attendance: 11,719
Referee: Nobutsugu Murakami

2010-12-25
13:00

Gamba Osaka	2–1 (a.e.t.)	Urawa Red Diamonds
Yasuhito Endō 72'; Usami 103'	Report	Ugajin 81'

Osaka Expo '70 Stadium, Suita
Attendance: 14,815
Referee: Minoru Tōjō

== Semi-finals ==
2010-12-29
15:00

Kashima Antlers	2–1 (a.e.t.)	FC Tokyo
Osako 67'; Koroki 120+1'	Report	Hirayama 39'

National Olympic Stadium, Shinjuku, Tokyo
Attendance: 25,120
Referee: Ryuji Sato

2010-12-29
13:00

Shimizu S-Pulse	3–0	Gamba Osaka
Johnsen 19', 61'; Hyodo 28'	Report

Ecopa Stadium, Fukuroi
Attendance: 14,179
Referee: Kenji Ogiya

== Final ==
2011-01-01
14:00

Kashima Antlers	2–1	Shimizu S-Pulse
Fellype Gabriel 26'; Nozawa 77'	Report	Johnsen 59'

National Olympic Stadium, Shinjuku, Tokyo
Attendance: 41,348
Referee: Masaaki Iemoto
