= 2009 Sagan Tosu season =

Sagan Tosu
2009 season
- Manager: Yasuyuki Kishino
- Stadium: Best Amenity Stadium
- J. League 2: 5th
- Emperor's Cup: 4th Round
- Top goalscorer: Mike Havenaar (15)

2009 Sagan Tosu season

== Competitions ==
Competitions	Position
J. League 2	5th / 18 clubs
Emperor's Cup	4th Round

== Player statistics ==
No.	Pos.	Player	D.o.B. (Age)	Height / Weight	J. League 2		Emperor's Cup		Total	
No.	Pos.	Player	D.o.B. (Age)	Height / Weight	Apps	Goals	Apps	Goals	Apps	Goals
1	GK	Taku Akahoshi	April 21, 1984 (aged 24)	cm / kg	0	0				
2	DF	Masayuki Yanagisawa	August 27, 1979 (aged 29)	cm / kg	46	2				
3	DF	Keita Isozaki	November 17, 1980 (aged 28)	cm / kg	35	0				
4	DF	Yasumichi Uchima	September 10, 1984 (aged 24)	cm / kg	14	0				
5	DF	Kazuya Iio	April 10, 1980 (aged 28)	cm / kg	48	3				
6	MF	Keiji Takachi	April 23, 1980 (aged 28)	cm / kg	41	8				
7	MF	Koji Hirose	March 13, 1984 (aged 24)	cm / kg	31	3				
8	MF	Yu Eto	October 17, 1983 (aged 25)	cm / kg	1	0				
9	FW	Hiroshi Ichihara	April 24, 1987 (aged 21)	cm / kg	1	0				
10	MF	Yusuke Shimada	January 19, 1982 (aged 27)	cm / kg	50	8				
11	FW	Tozin	November 10, 1984 (aged 24)	cm / kg	39	11				
12	GK	Toshimitsu Asai	April 4, 1983 (aged 25)	cm / kg	5	0				
13	DF	Takuma Hidaka	April 8, 1983 (aged 25)	cm / kg	32	3				
14	MF	Yoshiki Takahashi	May 14, 1985 (aged 23)	cm / kg	46	6				
15	DF	Yusuke Yada	September 22, 1983 (aged 25)	cm / kg	10	0				
18	MF	Yosuke Nozaki	February 16, 1985 (aged 24)	cm / kg	25	1				
19	MF	Hirokazu Hasegawa	October 20, 1986 (aged 22)	cm / kg	0	0				
20	DF	Masaki Watanabe	December 2, 1986 (aged 22)	cm / kg	40	2				
21	GK	Takuya Muro	November 2, 1982 (aged 26)	cm / kg	47	0				
23	MF	Yu Shimasaki	September 26, 1985 (aged 23)	cm / kg	4	0				
24	MF	Koya Shimizu	June 15, 1982 (aged 26)	cm / kg	4	0				
25	FW	Kei Ikeda	October 20, 1986 (aged 22)	cm / kg	15	1				
26	MF	Yuto Takeoka	June 24, 1986 (aged 22)	cm / kg	40	3				
27	MF	Sho Shimoji	August 2, 1985 (aged 23)	cm / kg	18	0				
28	FW	Josue	July 10, 1987 (aged 21)	cm / kg	4	0				
28	MF	Roberto	February 20, 1979 (aged 30)	cm / kg	13	1				
29	MF	Samuel	July 23, 1989 (aged 19)	cm / kg	0	0				
30	MF	Yuki Kuriyama	September 15, 1988 (aged 20)	cm / kg	0	0				
31	FW	Kenzo Taniguchi	December 22, 1988 (aged 20)	cm / kg	3	0				
32	DF	Takuya Yamada	August 24, 1974 (aged 34)	cm / kg	43	1				
34	MF	Yukihiro Yamase	April 22, 1984 (aged 24)	cm / kg	24	2				
35	FW	Mike Havenaar	May 20, 1987 (aged 21)	cm / kg	33	15				

== Other pages ==
- (in Japanese) J. League official site
