= 2018 Sagan Tosu season =

Sagan Tosu
2018 season
- Manager: Massimo Ficcadenti; Kim Myung-hwi
- Stadium: Best Amenity Stadium
- J1 League: 14th
Home colours	Away colours

2018 Sagan Tosu season.

== Squad ==
As of 10 July 2018. Note: Flags indicate national team as defined under FIFA eligibility rules; some limited exceptions apply. Players may hold more than one non-FIFA nationality.

No.	Pos.	Nation	Player
1	GK	JPN	Taku Akahoshi
2	DF	JPN	Hiromu Mitsumaru
3	DF	JPN	Yuji Takahashi
4	MF	JPN	Riki Harakawa
5	DF	KOR	Kim Min-hyeok
6	MF	JPN	Akito Fukuta
7	MF	JPN	Hiroki Kawano
8	DF	JPN	Masato Fujita
9	FW	ESP	Fernando Torres
11	FW	JPN	Yohei Toyoda
12	GK	JPN	Shugo Tsuji
13	DF	JPN	Yuzo Kobayashi
14	MF	JPN	Yoshiki Takahashi
15	DF	KOR	Jeong Seung-hyun
19	FW	KOR	Cho Dong-geon

No.	Pos.	Nation	Player
20	GK	JPN	Shuichi Gonda
21	MF	JPN	Kohei Kato
22	FW	JPN	Kei Ikeda
23	DF	JPN	Yutaka Yoshida
24	DF	JPN	Kazuki Anzai
25	MF	KOR	An Yong-woo
26	MF	JPN	Ryoya Ito
27	FW	JPN	Kyosuke Tagawa
28	MF	JPN	Hiroto Ishikawa
29	MF	JPN	Hiroyuki Taniguchi
30	GK	JPN	Fantini Akira
32	FW	COL	Víctor Ibarbo
36	MF	JPN	Hideto Takahashi
40	FW	JPN	Yuji Ono
50	MF	JPN	Koki Mizuno

== J1 League ==
Match	Date	Team	Score	Team	Venue	Attendance
1	2018.02.23	Sagan Tosu	1-1	Vissel Kobe	Best Amenity Stadium	19,633
2	2018.03.03	V-Varen Nagasaki	2-2	Sagan Tosu	Transcosmos Stadium Nagasaki	14,125
3	2018.03.10	Yokohama F. Marinos	1-2	Sagan Tosu	NHK Spring Mitsuzawa Football Stadium	11,247
4	2018.03.18	Sagan Tosu	0-1	Kashima Antlers	Best Amenity Stadium	17,757
5	2018.03.31	Sagan Tosu	3-2	Nagoya Grampus	Best Amenity Stadium	12,957
6	2018.04.07	Cerezo Osaka	2-1	Sagan Tosu	Kincho Stadium	10,627
7	2018.04.11	Sagan Tosu	1-2	Kashiwa Reysol	Best Amenity Stadium	7,138
8	2018.04.15	Júbilo Iwata	1-0	Sagan Tosu	Yamaha Stadium	11,126
9	2018.04.21	Sanfrecce Hiroshima	1-0	Sagan Tosu	Edion Stadium Hiroshima	13,706
10	2018.04.25	Sagan Tosu	0-2	Kawasaki Frontale	Best Amenity Stadium	8,490
11	2018.04.29	Gamba Osaka	3-0	Sagan Tosu	Panasonic Stadium Suita	18,642
12	2018.05.02	Sagan Tosu	1-2	Hokkaido Consadole Sapporo	Best Amenity Stadium	7,377
13	2018.05.06	Sagan Tosu	3-1	Shimizu S-Pulse	Best Amenity Stadium	14,103
14	2018.05.13	Urawa Reds	0-0	Sagan Tosu	Saitama Stadium 2002	40,137
15	2018.05.20	Sagan Tosu	0-0	FC Tokyo	Best Amenity Stadium	12,163
16	2018.07.18	Shonan Bellmare	1-1	Sagan Tosu	Shonan BMW Stadium Hiratsuka	9,229
17	2018.07.22	Sagan Tosu	0-1	Vegalta Sendai	Best Amenity Stadium	17,537
18	2018.07.28	Sagan Tosu	0-0	Júbilo Iwata	Best Amenity Stadium	14,333
19	2018.08.01	Shimizu S-Pulse	1-0	Sagan Tosu	IAI Stadium Nihondaira	14,307
20	2018.08.05	Sagan Tosu	1-0	Cerezo Osaka	Best Amenity Stadium	14,463
21	2018.08.11	Sagan Tosu	1-0	Urawa Reds	Best Amenity Stadium	19,681
22	2018.08.15	Kawasaki Frontale	0-0	Sagan Tosu	Kawasaki Todoroki Stadium	24,390
23	2018.08.19	Nagoya Grampus	3-0	Sagan Tosu	Paloma Mizuho Stadium	19,646
24	2018.08.26	Sagan Tosu	3-0	Gamba Osaka	Best Amenity Stadium	20,060
25	2018.09.02	FC Tokyo	0-0	Sagan Tosu	Ajinomoto Stadium	30,867
26	2018.09.15	Sagan Tosu	1-0	Sanfrecce Hiroshima	Best Amenity Stadium	15,899
27	2018.09.22	Kashiwa Reysol	1-1	Sagan Tosu	Sankyo Frontier Kashiwa Stadium	12,922
28	2018.09.29	Hokkaido Consadole Sapporo	2-1	Sagan Tosu	Sapporo Dome	16,195
29	2018.10.06	Sagan Tosu	0-1	Shonan Bellmare	Best Amenity Stadium	11,557
30	2018.10.20	Vegalta Sendai	2-3	Sagan Tosu	Yurtec Stadium Sendai	18,023
31	2018.11.04	Sagan Tosu	1-0	V-Varen Nagasaki	Best Amenity Stadium	22,669
32	2018.11.10	Vissel Kobe	0-0	Sagan Tosu	Noevir Stadium Kobe	26,603
33	2018.11.24	Sagan Tosu	2-1	Yokohama F. Marinos	Best Amenity Stadium	19,187
34	2018.12.01	Kashima Antlers	0-0	Sagan Tosu	Kashima Soccer Stadium	31,619
