= Takamasa =

- Gender: Male

Origin
- Origin: Japanese
- Meaning: Different meanings depending on the kanji used

Takamasa (written: 隆将, 隆正, 貴匡, 貴政, 高政, 高雅 or 考真) is a masculine Japanese given name. Notable people with the name include:

- Takamasa Abiko (安彦 考真; born 1978), Japanese footballer
- Takamasa Anai (穴井 隆将; born 1984), Japanese judoka
- Chisaka Takamasa (千坂 高雅; 1841–1912), Japanese samurai
- Hatakeyama Takamasa (畠山 高政; 1527–1576), Japanese daimyō
- Takamasa Inamura (稲村 隆正; 1923–1989), Japanese photographer
- Takamasa Ishihara (石原貴雅; born 1981), Japanese musician, known as Miyavi
- Takamasa Oe (大江 崇允; born 1981), Japanese screenwriter
- Takamasa Sakai (酒井 貴政; born 1988), Japanese footballer
- Takamasa Suga (須賀 貴匡; born 1977), Japanese actor
- Takamasa Watanabe (渡辺 隆正; born 1977), Japanese footballer
- Takamasa Yoshizaka (吉阪 隆正; 1917–1980), Japanese architect
