= Dezzolla Shimane =

Japanese semi-professional football team

- Full name: Dezzolla Shimane Esporte Clube
- Nickname: Dezzolla
- Founded: 2001 (as FC Central Chūgoku); 2008 (as Dezzolla Shimane)
- Dissolved: 2020
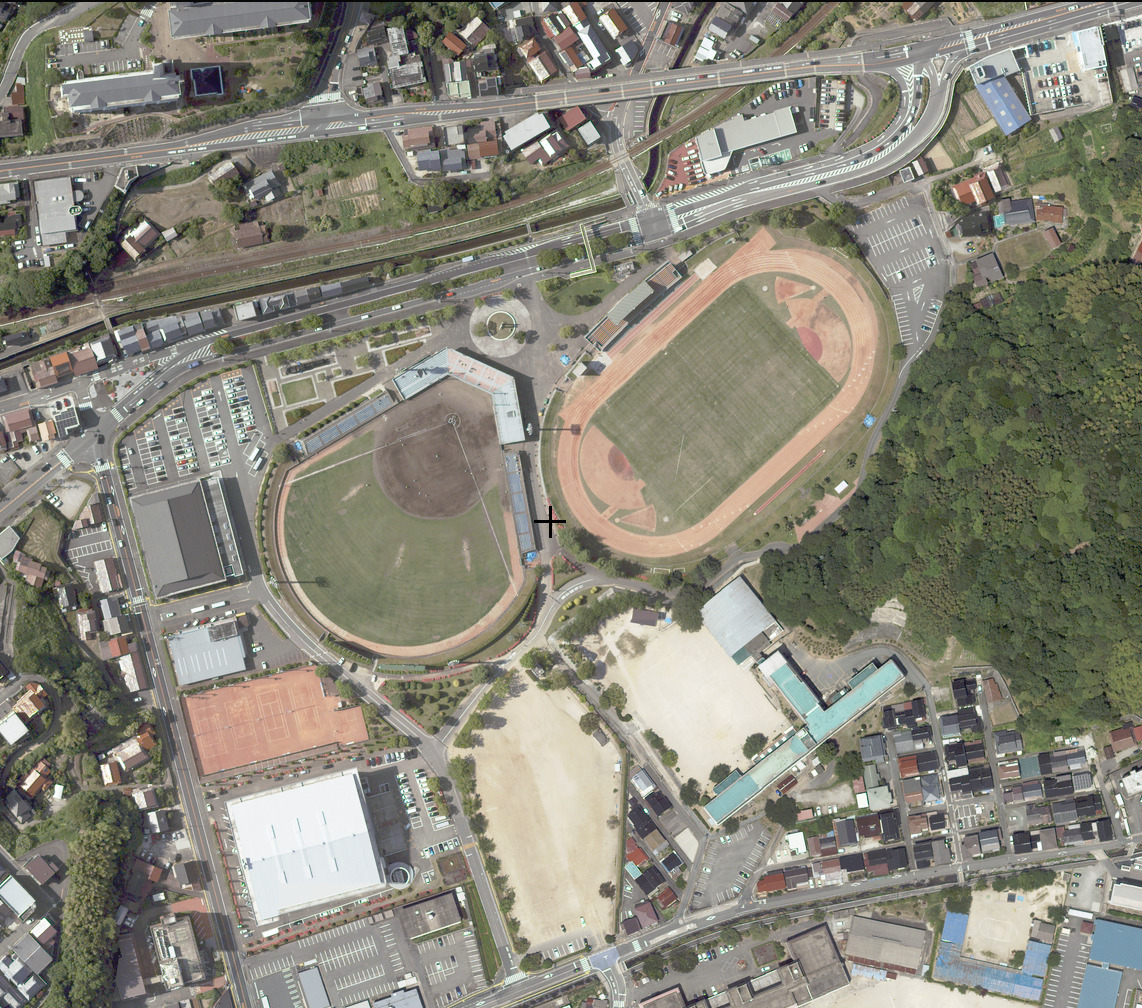
- Ground: Hamada-shi Athletics Stadium
- Capacity: 5,000
- Manager: Takashi Shoji (player-manager)
- League: Chūgoku Soccer League
- 2018: 10th
Home colours	Away colours

Dezzolla Shimane Esporte Clube (デッツォーラ島根EC, Dezōla Shimane Esuporuchi Kurūbi) was a Japanese semi-professional football team based in Hamada city, Shimane Prefecture. They played in the Chūgoku League, the fourth tier of the Japanese football league system. They were formerly known as FC Central Chūgoku (FCセントラル中国, FC Sentoraru Chūgoku).

== Outline ==
The team was established in April 2001 as FC Central Chūgoku. Though registered to play in Shimane Prefecture, their office and training grounds were originally located in what is now Kitahiroshima, Yamagata district, Hiroshima Prefecture. In 2008 the team changed its name to Dezzolla Shimane Esporte Clube, and began to shift its base of operations to Hamada city and the surrounding areas, allowing citizens throughout the prefecture to feel a part of the club. The name is a corrupted portmanteau of the Portuguese words "Deus", meaning "God", and "Olá", meaning "hello". While "Esporte Clube" is Portuguese for "Sport Club". The move was completed in 2012.

As FC Central Chūgoku, home games were mainly played at Hamada City Track and Field Ground and Sun Village Hamada. However, in order to strengthen the idea that it is a club for the whole prefecture, under the name Dezzolla Shimane they also played home matches at Matsue Athletic Stadium (Matsue), Misumi Central Park Track and Field Ground (Hamada), Hamayama Park Track and Field Ground (Izumo and Shimane Prefectural Soccer Park (Masuda). In 2010 Matsue City FC (then known as Volador Matsue) were promoted to the Chūgoku League, after which they, rather than Dezzolla Shimane, used the Matsue Athletic Stadium for home games. For the 2012 season, Dezzolla Shimane's home games are held only at Hamada City Track and Field Ground and Shimane Prefectural Soccer Park.

In 2004, the team made their Emperor's Cup debut at the expense of Iwami F.C. who had represented Shimane Prefecture consecutively from 1997 to 2003. They received a bye to the second round where they beat Shizuoka F.C. on penalties, but were eliminated in the third round due to an 8–0 defeat away to Honda F.C. Similarly, Dezzolla Shimane achieved continuous Emperor's Cup nominations until losing out to Hamada F.C. Cosmos, who are also based in Hamada city, in 2009.

The 2011 season saw the team win its first Chūgoku League title, the first team from Shimane Prefecture to do so. For only the second time, the first being in 2007 when they finished second in the league, they qualified to enter the Regional League promotion series. However, a first round elimination ensured there would be no promotion to the Japan Football League the following season.

From 2012 the management structure at the club had changed, with plans to establish a corporation to run the club announced on the official website, after which the club's head office moved location to Hamada city. It had not been made clear, however, if the club's parent company had or had not also been incorporated. From March 2012, the club also launched an official Twitter account.

Since it was formed, the club had mainly just enlisted various new members, but following the enrollment of such individuals as Takashi Shoji and Kazuaki Hayshi, over the years the team's aspiration also increased. The result being a young team with strong aspirations claiming a 2011 league victory with a desire to continue improving through 2012.

2020 Dissolution of Club announcement (in Japanese)

Today, the CSL Steering Committee approved it, so I would like to report it.

Today the CSL Steering Committee approved it, so I wanted to officially share the news.

Unfortunately, because of the impact of COVID-19, we had to disband the team at the end of fiscal 2020, and we submitted our request to withdraw from the Chūgoku League. This wasn't an easy decision — we thought about it a lot and really struggled with it.

We sincerely thank all the players, coaching staff, sponsors, supporters, the Shimane Football Association, and the Hamada Branch for their support over the years.

Unfortunately, we have made the difficult decision to dissolve the team and withdraw from the CSL. After careful thought, we concluded that we can no longer provide the environment our players need and deserve. This was a hard decision, but we believe it is the right one under the current circumstances.

That said, we will continue our youth development efforts. Our U-12 team, now operating under the name "Dezzola Shimane E.C.", remains active, and we are committed to contributing to local football in the future.

== History ==
- 2001 – FC Central Chūgoku established and entered into the Hamada Adult League Division 2. League champions. Promotion to Hamada Adult League Division 1.
- 2002 – Hamada Adult League Division 1 champions. Promotion to Shimane Prefectural League Division 2.
- 2003 – Shimane Prefectural League Division 2 champions. Promotion to Shimane Prefectural League Division 1.
- 2004 – Emperor's Cup debut, eliminated in 3rd round.
- 2005 – Shimane Prefectural League Division 1 champions. Chūgoku Soccer League Promotion Tournament champions. Promotion to the Chūgoku League.
- 2006 – Chūgoku League runner up.
- 2007 – Chūgoku League runner up. Regional League promotion series debut, first round elimination.
- 2008 – FC Central Chūgoku becomes Dezzolla Shimane.
- 2009 – End of consecutive Emperor's Cup appearances at the hands of Hamada F.C. Cosmos.
- 2010 – Chūgoku League runner up.
- 2011 – Chūgoku League champions. Regional League promotion series first round elimination.
- 2012 – Office moves to Hamada.
- 2018 – Relegated from the Chugoku regional league to the Shimane Prefectural League.
- 2019 – Champions of Shimane Prefectural League.
- 2020 – Did not participate in the Chugoku Soccer League and dissolved as a club.

== Name changes ==
- FC Central Chūgoku (FCセントラル中国, FC Sentoraru Chūgoku): 2001 – 2007
- Dezzolla Shimane Esporte Clube (デッツォーラ島根EC, Dezōla Shimane Esupōte Kurabu): 2008

== League record ==
Champions	Runners-up	Third place	Promoted	Relegated

Up until the end of the 2006 season, when a match ended in a draw a penalty shoot-out would occur. The winning team were awarded 2 points, and the losing team 1 point.

Season	Division	Pos.	P	W	D	L	F	A	GD	Pts	Emperor's Cup	Manager	Notes
2001	Hamada Adult; League D2	1st									Did not qualify		
2002	Hamada Adult; League D1	1st									Did not qualify		
2003	Shimane Prefectural; League D2	1st									Did not qualify		
2004	Shimane Prefectural; League D1										Third round		
2005	Shimane Prefectural; League D1	1st	10	10	0	0	75	4	71	30	Second round	Yasuhiro Wakami	
2006	Chūgoku; Soccer League	2nd	14	11	0	3	50	16	34	34	Second round	Yasuhiro Wakami	Dezzolla Shimane lost 1 match following a penalty shoot-out.
2007	Chūgoku; Soccer League	2nd	14	10	0	4	42	26	16	30	First round	Yasuhiro Wakami	First round elimination in the promotion series
2008	Chūgoku; Soccer League	5th	16	8	2	6	26	26	0	26	First round	Yasuhiro Wakami	
2009	Chūgoku; Soccer League	6th	18	6	2	10	23	37	−14	20	Did not qualify		
2010	Chūgoku; Soccer League	2nd	18	13	1	4	60	31	29	40	Second round	Yasuhiro Wakami	
2011	Chūgoku; Soccer League	1st	18	16	0	2	60	19	41	48	Second round	Yasuhiro Wakami; Takashi Shoji; Kenji Kato	First round elimination in the promotion series
2012	Chūgoku; Soccer League	1st	18	14	3	1	61	16	45	45	Did not qualify	Gaku Ishida	First round elimination in the promotion series
2013	Chūgoku; Soccer League	2nd	18	14	1	3	64	6	58	43	First round	Takashi Shoji	
2014	Chūgoku; Soccer League	2nd	18	10	4	4	46	31	15	34	First round	Takashi Shoji	
2015	Chūgoku; Soccer League	2nd	18	13	2	3	42	18	24	41	Did not qualify	Takashi Shoji	
2016	Chūgoku; Soccer League	6th	18	7	2	9	28	33	−5	23	Did not qualify	Takashi Shoji	
2017	Chūgoku; Soccer League	4th	18	7	5	6	40	31	9	26	Did not qualify	Takashi Shoji	
2018	Chūgoku; Soccer League	10th	18	3	4	11	21	52	-31	13	Did not qualify		
