= Daichi Okumiya =

Japanese footballer

Daichi Okumiya 屋宮 大地
Personal information
- Full name: Daichi Okumiya
- Date of birth: November 27, 1988 (age 37)
- Place of birth: Kagoshima, Japan
- Height: 1.70 m (5 ft 7 in)
- Position: Defender

Youth career
- 2007–2010: University of Teacher; Education Fukuoka

Senior career*
Years	Team	Apps	(Gls)
2011–2013	Honda Lock	93	(5)
2014–2015	FC Ryukyu	58	(1)
2016–2017	FC Amawari		
2018	FC Ryukyu	5	(1)
- * Club domestic league appearances and goals as of 5 January 2019

Daichi Okumiya (屋宮 大地, Okumiya Daichi; born November 27, 1988) is a former Japanese football player.

== Playing career ==
Daichi Okumiya played for Honda Lock and FC Ryukyu from 2011 to 2015. After two years with FC Amawari in the Okinawa Prefectural League, he joined back FC Ryukyu.

== Club statistics ==
Updated to 22 February 2018.

Club performance			League		Cup		Total	
Season	Club	League	Apps	Goals	Apps	Goals	Apps	Goals
Japan			League		Emperor's Cup		Total	
2011	Honda Lock	JFL	31	1	1	0	32	1
2012	Honda Lock	JFL	29	0	0	0	0	0
2013	Honda Lock	JFL	33	4	0	0	0	0
2014	FC Ryukyu	J3 League	26	1	1	0	27	1
2015	FC Ryukyu	J3 League	32	0	1	0	33	0
Total			151	6	3	0	154	6
