= Kosuke Kitani =

Japanese footballer

Kosuke Kitani 木谷 公亮
Personal information
- Date of birth: 9 October 1978 (age 48)
- Place of birth: Kamagaya, Japan
- Height: 1.83 m (6 ft 0 in)
- Position: Defender

Youth career
- 1994–1996: Shutoku High School

College career
Years	Team	Apps	(Gls)
1997–2000	Kokushikan University		

Senior career*
Years	Team	Apps	(Gls)
2001–2004	Omiya Ardija	46	(3)
2005–2009	Vegalta Sendai	159	(2)
2010–2013	Sagan Tosu	75	(6)
2013–2014	FC Gifu	42	(1)
Total		322	(12)

Managerial career
- 2024–2025: Sagan Tosu
- * Club domestic league appearances and goals

Kosuke Kitani (木谷 公亮, Kitani Kosuke; born 9 October 1978) is a Japanese football manager and a former player.

== Playing career ==
After graduating from Kokushikan University, he joined J2 League club Omiya Ardija in 2001. Although he debuted in first season, he could hardly play in the match until summer 2003. He played many matches as defensive midfielder and center back from summer 2003. However his opportunity to play decreased in 2004. Although Ardija finished in second place and was promoted to J1 League for the following season, he left the club end of 2004 season without playing in J1.

In 2005, Kitani signed with J2 club Vegalta Sendai. He became a regular player as centre back soon and played many matches until 2008. However, he could hardly play in the match behind Kodai Watanabe and Elizeu in 2009. Vegalta won the league and was promoted to J1 from 2010, he left the club at the end of 2009 season.

In 2010, Kitani signed with J2 club Sagan Tosu. He became a regular player soon. In 2011, he played all 38 matches and Sagan finished in second place and was promoted to J1. Although he played in J1 first time in his career in 2012, he lost his position and could only play 4 matches in late in 2012 season.

In July 2013, Kitani moved to J2 club FC Gifu. He played all 17 matches in 2013 season. He retired as a player at the end of 2014 season.

== Career statistics ==
Appearances and goals by club, season and competition
Club	Season	League			Emperor's Cup		J.League Cup		Total	
Club	Season	Division	Apps	Goals	Apps	Goals	Apps	Goals	Apps	Goals
Omiya Ardija	2001	J2 League	1	0	0	0	0	0	1	0
Omiya Ardija	2002	J2 League	2	0	3	0	—		5	0
Omiya Ardija	2003	J2 League	25	2	2	0	—		27	2
Omiya Ardija	2004	J2 League	18	1	2	0	—		20	1
Omiya Ardija	Total		46	3	7	0	0	0	53	3
Vegalta Sendai	2005	J2 League	41	1	1	0	—		42	1
Vegalta Sendai	2006	J2 League	45	0	2	0	—		47	0
Vegalta Sendai	2007	J2 League	41	0	0	0	—		41	0
Vegalta Sendai	2008	J2 League	30	1	0	0	—		30	1
Vegalta Sendai	2009	J2 League	2	0	2	0	—		4	0
Vegalta Sendai	Total		159	2	5	0	—		164	2
Sagan Tosu	2010	J2 League	33	3	2	0	—		35	3
Sagan Tosu	2011	J2 League	38	3	0	0	—		38	3
Sagan Tosu	2012	J1 League	4	0	0	0	0	0	4	0
Sagan Tosu	2013	J1 League	0	0	0	0	1	0	1	0
Sagan Tosu	Total		75	6	2	0	1	0	78	6
FC Gifu	2013	J2 League	17	1	1	0	—		18	1
FC Gifu	2014	J2 League	25	0	0	0	—		25	0
FC Gifu	Total		42	1	1	0	—		43	1
Career total			322	16	17	0	1	0	340	16
