= Daiki Nishioka =

Japanese footballer

Daiki Nishioka 西岡大輝
Personal information
- Full name: Daiki Nishioka
- Date of birth: 21 August 1988 (age 38)
- Place of birth: Miyazaki, Japan
- Height: 1.80 m (5 ft 11 in)
- Position: Defender

Team information
- Current team: Ehime FC
- Number: 4

Youth career
- 2004–2006: Tokai University Daigo; Senior High School
- 2006–2010: University of Teacher; Education Fukuoka

Senior career*
Years	Team	Apps	(Gls)
2011–2013	Sanfrecce Hiroshima	0	(0)
2013	→ Tochigi SC (loan)	9	(0)
2014–	Ehime FC	117	(1)
Medal record
Sanfrecce Hiroshima
Winner	J1 League	2012
- * Club domestic league appearances and goals as of 1 January 2019

Daiki Nishioka (西岡大輝, Nishioka, Daiki; born 21 August 1988 in Miyazaki, Miyazaki) is a Japanese footballer who plays for Ehime FC.

== Club statistics ==
Updated to end of 2018 season.

Club performance			League		Cup		League Cup		Other		Total	
Season	Club	League	Apps	Goals	Apps	Goals	Apps	Goals	Apps	Goals	Apps	Goals
Japan			League		Emperor's Cup		J. League Cup		Other^{1}		Total	
2011	Sanfrecce Hiroshima	J1 League	0	0	0	0	0	0	–		0	0
2012	Sanfrecce Hiroshima	J1 League	0	0	0	0	0	0	0	0	0	0
2013	Tochigi SC	J2 League	9	0	2	0	–		–		11	0
2014	Ehime FC	J2 League	21	0	2	0	–		–		23	0
2015	Ehime FC	J2 League	33	1	2	0	–		1	0	36	1
2016	Ehime FC	J2 League	24	0	2	0	–		–		26	0
2017	Ehime FC	J2 League	12	0	1	0	–		–		13	0
2018	Ehime FC	J2 League	27	0	0	0	–		–		27	0
Career total			126	1	9	0	0	0	1	0	136	1

^{1}Includes Japanese Super Cup and J2 playoffs.
