= Kyohei Kuroki =

Japanese footballer

Kyohei Kuroki 黒木 恭平
Personal information
- Full name: Kyohei Kuroki
- Date of birth: 31 July 1989 (age 37)
- Place of birth: Kikuchi District, Kumamoto, Japan
- Height: 1.75 m (5 ft 9 in)
- Position: Defender

College career
Years	Team	Apps	(Gls)
2008–2011	Fukuoka University		

Senior career*
Years	Team	Apps	(Gls)
2011–2013	Sagan Tosu	1	(0)
2013	→ Ehime FC (loan)	23	(1)
2014	Verspah Oita	21	(2)
2015–2016	Renofa Yamaguchi	44	(0)
2017	Oita Trinita	9	(1)
2018	Kagoshima United FC	4	(0)
2018	→ Kyoto Sanga FC (loan)	4	(0)
2019–2021	Kyoto Sanga FC	73	(2)
Total		179	(6)
- * Club domestic league appearances and goals

Kyohei Kuroki (黒木 恭平, Kuroki Kyohei; born 31 July 1989) is a Japanese former footballer who played as a defender.

== Career ==
Kyohei made his debut for Sagan Tosu on 10 July 2011 against Kataller Toyama.

== Career statistics ==
=== Club ===
Appearances and goals by club, season and competition
Club	Season	League			National Cup		League Cup		Total	
Club	Season	Division	Apps	Goals	Apps	Goals	Apps	Goals	Apps	Goals
Japan			League		Emperor's Cup		J. League Cup		Total	
Fukuoka University	2011	–			3	0	–		3	0
Sagan Tosu	2011	J.League Division 2	1	0	0	0	–		1	0
Sagan Tosu	2012	J.League Division 1	0	0	0	0	2	0	2	0
Sagan Tosu	Total		1	0	0	0	2	0	3	0
Ehime FC (loan)	2013	J.League Division 2	23	1	0	0	–		23	1
Verspah Oita	2014	JFL	21	2	1	0	–		22	2
Renofa Yamaguchi	2015	J3 League	33	0	1	0	–		34	0
Renofa Yamaguchi	2016	J2 League	11	0	0	0	–		11	0
Renofa Yamaguchi	Total		44	0	1	0	0	0	45	0
Oita Trinita	2017	J2 League	9	1	2	0	–		11	1
Kagoshima United	2018	J3 League	4	0	2	0	–		6	0
Kyoto Sanga (loan)	2018	J2 League	4	0	0	0	–		4	0
Kyoto Sanga	2019	J2 League	41	2	0	0	–		41	2
Kyoto Sanga	2020	J2 League	26	0	0	0	–		26	0
Kyoto Sanga	2021	J2 League	6	0	3	0	–		9	0
Kyoto Sanga	Total		73	2	3	0	0	0	76	2
Career total			179	6	12	0	2	0	193	6

== Honours ==
Renofa Yamaguchi

- J3 League: 2015

== Personal life ==
He is the twin brother of Kohei Kuroki.
