= Takashi Shoji =

Japanese footballer and manager

Takashi Shoji 庄司 孝
Personal information
- Full name: Takashi Shoji
- Date of birth: September 14, 1971 (age 55)
- Place of birth: Chiba, Japan
- Height: 1.70 m (5 ft 7 in)
- Position: Midfielder

Youth career
- 1987–1989: Funabashi High School

Senior career*
Years	Team	Apps	(Gls)
1990–1994	Kashiwa Reysol		
1995–1999	Montedio Yamagata	108	(17)
2000–2001	Oita Trinita	42	(5)
2002–2004	Sun Miyazaki		

Managerial career
- 2014–: Dezzolla Shimane
- * Club domestic league appearances and goals

Takashi Shoji (庄司 孝, Shoji Takashi; born September 14, 1971) is a Japanese football player and manager.

== Playing career ==
Shoji was born in Chiba Prefecture on September 14, 1971. After graduating from high school, he joined Japan Soccer League club Hitachi (later Kashiwa Reysol) based in his local in 1990. However he could hardly play in the match until 1994. In 1995, he moved to Japan Football League club NEC Yamagata (later Montedio Yamagata). He became a regular player and the club was promoted to J2 League from 1999. In 2000, he moved to J2 club Oita Trinita. Although he played many matches in 2000, he could hardly play in the match in 2001. In 2002, he moved to Japan Football League club Professor Miyazaki (later Sun Miyazaki). Although he played many matches, the club was relegated to Regional Leagues from 2003. He left the club end of 2004 season.

== Coaching career ==
In 2014, when Shoji played for Regional Leagues club Dezzolla Shimane, he became a playing manager.

== Club statistics ==
Club performance			League		Cup		League Cup		Total	
Season	Club	League	Apps	Goals	Apps	Goals	Apps	Goals	Apps	Goals
Japan			League		Emperor's Cup		J.League Cup		Total	
1990/91	Hitachi	JSL Division 2	1	0			0	0	1	0
1991/92	Hitachi	JSL Division 1	0	0			0	0	0	0
1992	Hitachi	Football League								
1993	Kashiwa Reysol	Football League	0	0			0	0	0	0
1994	Kashiwa Reysol	Football League								
1995	NEC Yamagata	Football League	22	2			-		22	2
1996	Montedio Yamagata	Football League	27	4			-		27	4
1997	Montedio Yamagata	Football League	29	4			-		29	4
1998	Montedio Yamagata	Football League	30	7			-		30	7
1999	Montedio Yamagata	J2 League	21	2	0	0	1	0	22	2
2000	Oita Trinita	J2 League	19	3	3	0	1	0	23	3
2001	Oita Trinita	J2 League	2	0	0	0	0	0	2	0
2002	Professor Miyazaki	Football League	16	2	2	1	-		18	3
2003	Sun Miyazaki	Regional Leagues								
2004	Sun Miyazaki	Regional Leagues								
Total			167	24	5	1	2	0	174	25
