= Yusuke Yada =

Japanese footballer (born 1983)

Personal information
- Date of birth: September 22, 1983 (age 43)
- Place of birth: Asaka, Saitama, Japan
- Height: 1.73 m (5 ft 8 in)
- Position: Midfielder

Youth career
- 2002–2005: Hosei University

Senior career*
Years	Team	Apps	(Gls)
2006–2007	ALO's Hokuriku	67	(2)
2008–2009	Sagan Tosu	24	(0)
2010–2013	Kataller Toyama	77	(0)
Total		168	(2)
- * Club domestic league appearances and goals

Yusuke Yada (谷田 悠介, Yada Yūsuke; born September 22, 1983) is a former Japanese football player.

== Career statistics ==
Appearances and goals by club, season and competition
Club	Season	League			Emperor's Cup		Total	
Club	Season	Division	Apps	Goals	Apps	Goals	Apps	Goals
ALO's Hokuriku	2006	Football League	34	1	—		34	1
ALO's Hokuriku	2007	Football League	33	1	2	0	35	1
Sagan Tosu	2008	J2 League	14	0	3	0	17	0
Sagan Tosu	2009	J2 League	10	0	0	0	10	0
Kataller Toyama	2010	J2 League	20	0	0	0	20	0
Kataller Toyama	2011	J2 League						
Career total			111	2	5	0	116	2
