= Tatsuro Okuda =

Japanese footballer

Tatsuro Okuda 奥田 達朗
Personal information
- Full name: Tatsuro Okuda
- Date of birth: 20 September 1988 (age 38)
- Place of birth: Nara, Japan
- Height: 1.85 m (6 ft 1 in)
- Position: Goalkeeper

Team information
- Current team: Kochi United
- Number: 30

Youth career
- 2004–2006: Nara Ikuei Gakuen HS
- 2007–2010: Aichi Gakuin University

Senior career*
Years	Team	Apps	(Gls)
2011–2015	Sagan Tosu	9	(0)
2016	Júbilo Iwata	0	(0)
2017–2018	V-Varen Nagasaki	0	(0)
2019–	Kochi United		
- * Club domestic league appearances and goals as of 23 December 2018

Tatsuro Okuda (奥田 達朗, Okuda Tatsurō; born 20 September 1988) is a professional Japanese football player. He plays as a goalkeeper for Kochi United.

== Career statistics ==
Updated to 23 February 2018.

Appearances and goals by club, season and competition
Club	Season	League			Emperor's Cup		J.League Cup		Total	
Club	Season	Division	Apps	Goals	Apps	Goals	Apps	Goals	Apps	Goals
Sagan Tosu	2011	J2 League	1	0	0	0	—		1	0
Sagan Tosu	2012	J1 League	4	0	0	0	2	0	0	0
Sagan Tosu	2013	J1 League	4	0	0	0	2	0	0	0
Sagan Tosu	2014	J1 League	0	0	0	0	0	0	0	0
Sagan Tosu	2015	J1 League	0	0	1	0	0	0	1	0
Júbilo Iwata	2016	J1 League	0	0	1	0	0	0	1	0
V-Varen Nagasaki	2017	J2 League	0	0	0	0	—		0	0
Career total			9	0	2	0	4	0	15	0
