= Hiroto Ishikawa =

Japanese footballer

Hiroto Ishikawa 石川 啓人
Personal information
- Full name: Hiroto Ishikawa
- Date of birth: July 16, 1998 (age 28)
- Place of birth: Fukuoka, Japan
- Height: 1.72 m (5 ft 7 1/2 in)
- Position: Left back

Team information
- Current team: Renofa Yamaguchi
- Number: 7

Youth career
- 2014–2016: Sagan Tosu

Senior career*
Years	Team	Apps	(Gls)
2016–2020	Sagan Tosu	3	(0)
2020	→ Roasso Kumamoto (loan)	34	(1)
2021–	Renofa Yamaguchi	63	(2)
- * Club domestic league appearances and goals as of 13:59, 23 August 2024 (UTC)

Hiroto Ishikawa (石川 啓人, Ishikawa Hiroto; born July 16, 1998) is a Japanese football player who plays for Renofa Yamaguchi FC.

== Career ==
=== Sagan Tosu ===
Hiroto Ishikawa joined J1 League club Sagan Tosu in 2016. He made his league debut against Vegalta Sendai on 1 October 2016. Ishikawa scored his first goal in the J.League Cup against V-Varen Nagasaki on 4 April 2018, scoring in the 25th minute.

=== Loan to Rosso Kumamoto ===
Ishikawa scored on his league debut against Kagoshima United on 27 June 2020, scoring in the 4th minute.

=== Renofa Yamaguchi ===
On 6 January 2021, Ishikawa was announced at Renofa Yamaguchi. He made his league debut against Matsumoto Yamaga on 28 February 2021. Ishikawa scored his first league goal against Zweigen Kanazawa on 14 September 2021, scoring in the 84th minute.

== Career statistics ==
Updated to 24 February 2019.

Appearances and goals by club, season and competition
Club	Season	League			Emperor's Cup		J.League Cup		Total	
Club	Season	Division	Apps	Goals	Apps	Goals	Apps	Goals	Apps	Goals
Sagan Tosu	2016	J1 League	2	0	0	0	0	0	2	0
Sagan Tosu	2017	J1 League	1	0	0	0	4	0	5	0
Sagan Tosu	2018	J1 League	0	0	0	0	4	1	4	1
Career total			3	0	0	0	8	1	11	1
