= Lee Dong-myung =

South Korean footballer

Lee Dong-Myung
Personal information
- Date of birth: 4 October 1987 (age 39)
- Place of birth: South Korea
- Height: 1.80 m (5 ft 11 in)
- Position: Striker

Senior career*
Years	Team	Apps	(Gls)
2006–2007	Jeju United	10	(0)
2008–2009	Busan I'Park	10	(0)
2010	Fagiano Okayama	19	(2)
2011–2012	Oita Trinita	50	(2)
2013–	Daegu FC	6	(0)
- * Club domestic league appearances and goals as of 27 November 2014

- Lee Dong-myung
- Hangul: 이동명
- Hanja: 李東明
- RR: I Dongmyeong
- MR: I Tongmyŏng

Lee Dong-myung (Korean: 이동명; born 4 October 1987) is a South Korean footballer who currently plays for Daegu FC in K League Challenge.

He previously played for Busan I'Park, Jeju United, Fagiano Okayama and Oita Trinita.

Lee joined J2 League side Oita Trinita on loan until 31 January 2012.
