= Kim Kun-hoan =

South Korean footballer (born 1986)

Kim Kun-Hoan 김근환
Personal information
- Full name: Kim Kun-Hoan
- Date of birth: 12 August 1986 (age 40)
- Place of birth: South Korea
- Height: 1.94 m (6 ft 4 in)
- Position: Centre-back

Youth career
- Kyung Hee University

Senior career*
Years	Team	Apps	(Gls)
2008–2011	Yokohama F. Marinos	65	(6)
2010	→ Montedio Yamagata (loan)	4	(0)
2012	→ Sagan Tosu (loan)	31	(1)
2013	Albirex Niigata	19	(2)
2014–2015	Ulsan Hyundai	35	(0)
2016	Suwon FC	30	(0)
2017	FC Seoul	1	(0)
2017–2018	Gyeongnam FC	22	(3)
2019	Incheon United	1	(0)
2020	Gangneung Citizen FC	16	(1)

International career^{‡}
2007–2008	South Korea U-23	7	(1)
2009	South Korea	0	(0)
- * Club domestic league appearances and goals as of 12 April 2022 ‡ National team caps and goals as of 28 January 2010

- Kim Kun-hoan
- Hangul: 김근환
- Hanja: 金根煥
- RR: Gim Geunhwan
- MR: Kim Kŭnhwan

Kim Kun-Hoan (Korean: 김근환; born 12 August 1986) is a South Korean football player.

== Club career ==
On 6 January 2017, he joined FC Seoul.

For the 2020 season, he joined Gangneung Citizen FC. He left the club at the end of the season.

== International career ==
He was a member of the South Korea team for the 2008 Summer Olympics finals. On June 3, 2009, he made his first international cap for South Korea at the friendly match against Oman national football team on 2 June 2009. But this match was not full A match.

== Club statistics ==
As of January 10, 2013

Club	season	J1 League		Emperor's Cup		J.League Cup		Total	
Club	season	Apps	Goals	Apps	Goals	Apps	Goals	Apps	Goals
Yokohama F. Marinos	2008	7	1	3	0	0	0	10	1
Yokohama F. Marinos	2009	28	2	2	0	7	0	37	2
Montedio Yamagata	2010	4	0	0	0	2	0	6	0
Yokohama F. Marinos	2011	30	3	1	0	3	0	34	3
Sagan Tosu	2012	31	1	1	0	5	0	37	1
Career total		100	7	7	0	17	0	124	7
