= Shu Abe =

Japanese footballer

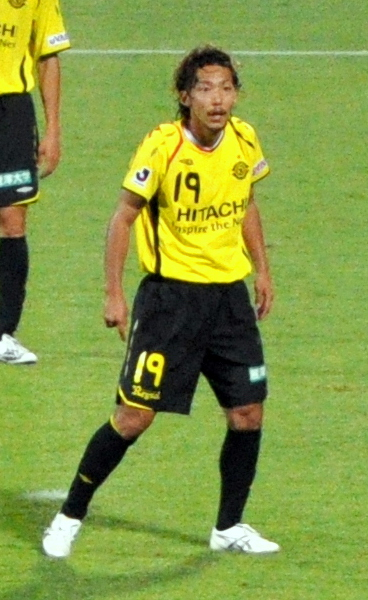

Personal information
- Full name: Shu Abe
- Date of birth: June 7, 1984 (age 42)
- Place of birth: Osaka, Japan
- Height: 1.75 m (5 ft 9 in)
- Position: Midfielder

Youth career
- 2003–2006: Ryutsu Keizai University

Senior career*
Years	Team	Apps	(Gls)
2007–2009	Kashiwa Reysol	2	(0)
2009–2010	Avispa Fukuoka	20	(0)
2011–2012	Zweigen Kanazawa	28	(1)
2013	FC Machida Zelvia	17	(3)
Total		67	(4)
Medal record
Kashiwa Reysol
Runner-up	Emperor's Cup	2008
- * Club domestic league appearances and goals

Shu Abe (阿部 嵩, Abe Shū; born June 7, 1984) is a former Japanese football player.

He generally plays from a central position as a defensively minded midfielder.

== Career statistics ==
Appearances and goals by club, season and competition
Club	Season	League			Emperor's Cup		J.League Cup		Total	
Club	Season	Division	Apps	Goals	Apps	Goals	Apps	Goals	Apps	Goals
Ryutsu Keizai University	2005	Football League	2	0	-		-		2	0
Ryutsu Keizai University	2006	Football League	10	0	1	0	-		11	0
Kashiwa Reysol	2007	J1 League	0	0	0	0	3	0	3	0
Kashiwa Reysol	2008	J1 League	1	0	0	0	1	0	2	0
Kashiwa Reysol	2009	J1 League	1	0	0	0	3	0	4	0
Avispa Fukuoka	2009	J2 League	17	0	2	0	-		19	0
Avispa Fukuoka	2010	J2 League	3	0	-		2	0	5	0
Career total			34	0	3	0	9	0	46	0
