= Takamasa Sakai =

Japanese footballer

Personal information
- Full name: Takamasa Sakai
- Date of birth: May 18, 1988 (age 38)
- Place of birth: Hiroshima, Japan
- Height: 1.73 m (5 ft 8 in)
- Position: Midfielder

Youth career
- 2007–2010: Kochi University

Senior career*
Years	Team	Apps	(Gls)
2011	Kataller Toyama	2	(0)
2012	Kamatamare Sanuki	8	(0)
Total		10	(0)
- * Club domestic league appearances and goals

Takamasa Sakai (酒井 貴政, Sakai Takamasa; born May 18, 1988) is a former Japanese football player.

== Club statistics ==
Club performance			League		Cup		Total	
Season	Club	League	Apps	Goals	Apps	Goals	Apps	Goals
Japan			League		Emperor's Cup		Total	
2011	Kataller Toyama	J2 League	2	0	0	0	2	0
Country	Japan		2	0	0	0	2	0
Total			2	0	0	0	2	0
