= Toshimitsu Asai =

Japanese footballer

Personal information
- Date of birth: April 4, 1983 (age 43)
- Place of birth: Fukuroi, Shizuoka, Japan
- Height: 1.82 m (5 ft 11 1/2 in)
- Position: Goalkeeper

Team information
- Current team: Nara Club
- Number: 20

Youth career
- 1999–2001: Júbilo Iwata

College career
Years	Team	Apps	(Gls)
2002–2005	Shizuoka Sangyo University		

Senior career*
Years	Team	Apps	(Gls)
2006–2010	Sagan Tosu	37	(0)
2011–2015	Blaublitz Akita	26	(0)
2016	Nara Club	1	(0)
Total		63	(0)
- * Club domestic league appearances and goals as of December 31, 2015

Toshimitsu Asai (浅井 俊光, Asai Toshimitsu; born April 4, 1983) is a Japanese football player. He plays for Nara Club.

== Career statistics ==
Appearances and goals by club, season and competition
Club	Season	League			Emperor's Cup		Total	
Club	Season	Division	Apps	Goals	Apps	Goals	Apps	Goals
Shizuoka Sangyo University	2002	Football League	16	0	0	0	16	0
Sagan Tosu	2006	J2 League	14	0	0	0	14	0
Sagan Tosu	2007	J2 League	14	0	1	0	15	0
Sagan Tosu	2008	J2 League	4	0	3	0	7	0
Sagan Tosu	2009	J2 League	5	0	1	0	6	0
Sagan Tosu	2010	J2 League	0	0	0	0	0	0
Blaublitz Akita	2011	Football League	11	0	0	0	11	0
Blaublitz Akita	2012	Football League	0	0	0	0	0	0
Blaublitz Akita	2013	Football League	7	0	0	0	7	0
Blaublitz Akita	2014	J3 League	8	0	0	0	8	0
Blaublitz Akita	2015	J3 League	0	0	0	0	0	0
Career total			79	0	5	0	84	0
