= So Morita =

Japanese footballer

So Morita 守田創
Personal information
- Full name: So Morita
- Date of birth: May 14, 1992 (age 34)
- Place of birth: Kumamoto, Japan
- Height: 1.73 m (5 ft 8 in)
- Position: Defender

Team information
- Current team: Tochigi Uva FC
- Number: 23

Youth career
- Sagan Tosu Youth

Senior career*
Years	Team	Apps	(Gls)
2010–2012	Sagan Tosu	1	(0)
2013–2017	Grulla Morioka	101	(2)
2018–	Tochigi Uva FC		
- * Club domestic league appearances and goals as of 23 February 2018

So Morita (守田創, born May 14, 1992) is a Japanese football player.

== Career statistics ==
Updated to 23 February 2018.

Appearances and goals by club, season and competition
Club	Season	League			Emperor's Cup		J.League Cup		Total	
Club	Season	Division	Apps	Goals	Apps	Goals	Apps	Goals	Apps	Goals
Sagan Tosu	2010	J2 League	1	0	–		–		1	0
Sagan Tosu	2011	J2 League	0	0	0	0	–		0	0
Sagan Tosu	2012	J1 League	0	0	0	0	1	0	1	0
Grulla Morioka	2013	JRL (Tohoku)	7	0	1	0	–		8	0
Grulla Morioka	2014	J3 League	33	0	1	0	–		34	0
Grulla Morioka	2015	J3 League	28	0	1	0	–		29	0
Grulla Morioka	2016	J3 League	8	0	0	0	–		8	0
Grulla Morioka	2017	J3 League	25	2	0	0	–		25	2
Career total			102	2	3	0	1	0	106	2
