= Yeo Sung-hae =

South Korean footballer (born 1987)

Personal information
- Full name: Yeo Sung-hae
- Date of birth: 6 August 1987 (age 39)
- Place of birth: South Korea
- Height: 1.86 m (6 ft 1 in)
- Position: Defender

Team information
- Current team: Seongnam

Youth career
- Hanyang University

Senior career*
Years	Team	Apps	(Gls)
2010–2014	Sagan Tosu	122	(3)
2014–2016	Gyeongnam	28	(1)
2015–2016	→ Sangju Sangmu (army)	23	(2)
2017	Matsumoto Yamaga	1	(0)
2017	Thespakusatsu Gunma	16	(0)
2018–2019	Gyeongnam	24	(0)
2019	→ Incheon United	12	(0)
2020	Ratchaburi Mitr Phol	10	(0)
2020	Sukhothai	5	(0)
2021–	Seongnam	0	(0)
- * Club domestic league appearances and goals as of 29 December 2020

- Yeo Sung-hae
- Hangul: 여성해
- Hanja: 呂成海
- RR: Yeo Seonghae
- MR: Yŏ Sŏnghae

Yeo Sung-hae (Korean: 여성해; born 6 August 1987) is a South Korean footballer who plays as defender for Seongnam.

== Club statistics ==
As of 3 December 2011

Club performance			League		Cup		League Cup		Total	
Season	Club	League	Apps	Goals	Apps	Goals	Apps	Goals	Apps	Goals
Japan			League		Emperor's Cup		League Cup		Total	
2010	Sagan Tosu	J2 League	25	0	2	0	-		27	0
2011	Sagan Tosu	J2 League	31	2	1	0	-		32	2
Career total			56	2	3	0			59	2
