= Kim Min-woo (footballer) =

South Korean footballer (born 1990)

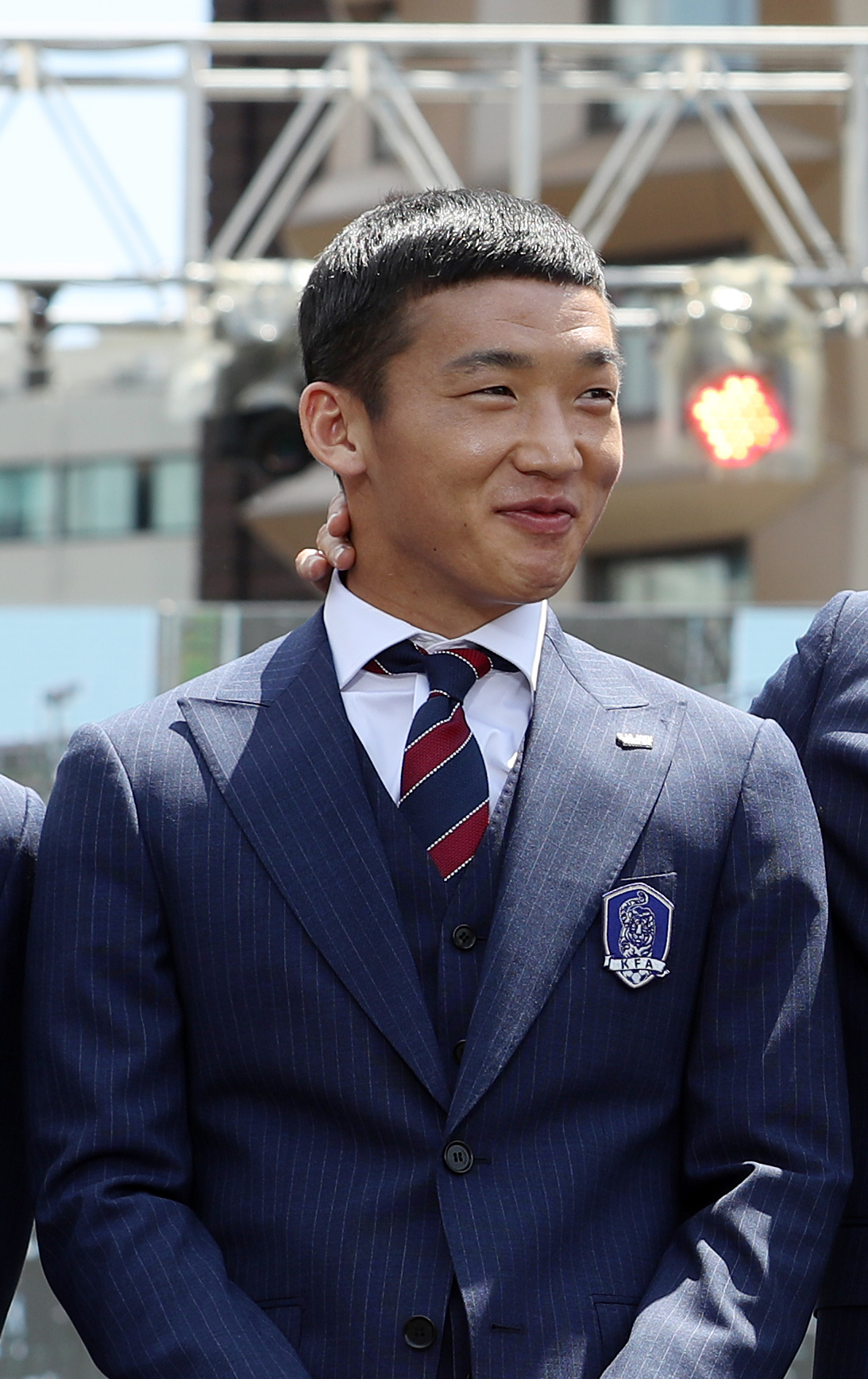
- Kim with South Korea at the 2018 FIFA World Cup

Personal information
- Full name: Kim Min-woo
- Date of birth: 25 February 1990 (age 36)
- Place of birth: Jinju, South Gyeongsang, South Korea
- Height: 1.72 m (5 ft 8 in)
- Positions: Midfielder; full-back

Team information
- Current team: YSCC Yokohama
- Number: 7

Youth career
- 2005–2008: Eonnam High School
- 2008–2009: Yonsei University

Senior career*
Years	Team	Apps	(Gls)
2010–2016	Sagan Tosu	213	(31)
2017–2021	Suwon Samsung Bluewings	96	(17)
2018–2019	→ Sangju Sangmu (army)	56	(4)
2022–2023	Chengdu Rongcheng	58	(10)
2024–2025	Ulsan HD	19	(2)
2025	Suwon Samsung Bluewings	12	(0)
2026	Yongin FC	7	(1)
2026–	YSCC Yokohama	0	(0)

International career^{‡}
2006–2007	South Korea U17	18	(1)
2009	South Korea U20	10	(5)
2009–2012	South Korea U23	13	(0)
2009	South Korea Universiade	3	(0)
2013–	South Korea	22	(1)
Medal record
Men's football
Representing South Korea
AFC Asian Cup
Runner-up	2015 Australia
Asian Games
Bronze medal – third place	2010 Guangzhou	Team
- * Club domestic league appearances and goals as of 6 January 2026 ‡ National team caps and goals as of 23 June 2018

- Kim Min-woo
- Hangul: 김민우
- Hanja: 金民友
- RR: Gim Minu
- MR: Kim Minu

Kim Min-woo (Korean: 김민우; born 25 February 1990) is a South Korean football player who is currently playing for Japan Football League club YSCC Yokohama.

== Club career ==
=== Early career ===
Kim attended Yonsei University in Seoul. When he was a member of Yonsei University, he scored 3 goals in 2009 FIFA U-20 World Cup as a member of South Korea under 20 team and team achieved quarterfinals. Encouraged by his great plays in U-20 World Cup, he made trials in PSV Eindhoven, but failed to pass the trials. The trials were conducted without the knowledge of Yonsei University and he was expelled from university football team.

=== Sagan Tosu ===
Unable to continue his career in Korea following the PSV episode, Kim was recruited by compatriot Yoon Jung-Hwan to join J. League Division 2 side Sagan Tosu. Kim signed a three-year contract with Sagan Tosu.

=== Chengdu Rongcheng ===
On 21 April 2022, Kim signed with Chinese Super League club Chengdu Rongcheng.

=== Ulsan HD ===
On 23 January 2024, Kim returned to his home country to join Ulsan HD.

== International career ==
He was member of South Korea U-20 team in 2009 FIFA U-20 World Cup. Kim was called up to the South Korea squad for friendly match against Nigeria for the first time in 2010

In May 2018 he was named in South Korea's preliminary 28 man squad for the 2018 FIFA World Cup in Russia.

== Career statistics ==
=== Club ===
As of match played 14 May 2025.

Appearances and goals by club, season and competition
Club performance			League		Cup		League Cup		Continental		Other		Total	
Club	Season	League	Apps	Goals	Apps	Goals	Apps	Goals	Apps	Goals	Apps	Goals	Apps	Goals
Sagan Tosu	2010	J2 League	24	4	1	0	—		—		—		25	4
Sagan Tosu	2011	J2 League	28	7	1	0	—		—		—		29	7
Sagan Tosu	2012	J1 League	31	2	1	0	4	0	—		—		36	2
Sagan Tosu	2013	J1 League	33	5	5	0	3	0	—		—		41	5
Sagan Tosu	2014	J1 League	34	6	3	0	3	0	—		—		40	6
Sagan Tosu	2015	J1 League	33	2	2	0	1	0	—		—		36	2
Sagan Tosu	2016	J1 League	30	5	3	0	3	0	—		—		36	5
Sagan Tosu	Total		213	31	16	0	14	0	—		—		243	31
Suwon Samsung Bluewings	2017	K League 1	30	6	3	0	—		6	0	—		39	6
Suwon Samsung Bluewings	2019	K League 1	6	1	2	1	—		—		—		8	2
Suwon Samsung Bluewings	2020	K League 1	27	4	2	0	—		7	1	—		36	5
Suwon Samsung Bluewings	2021	K League 1	33	6	0	0	—		—		—		33	6
Suwon Samsung Bluewings	Total		96	17	7	1	—		13	1	—		116	19
Sangju Sangmu (army)	2018	K League 1	36	2	0	0	—		—		—		36	2
Sangju Sangmu (army)	2019	K League 1	20	2	0	0	—		—		—		20	2
Sangju Sangmu (army)	Total		56	4	0	0	—		—		—		56	4
Chengdu Rongcheng	2022	Chinese Super League	34	4	0	0	—		—		—		34	4
Chengdu Rongcheng	2023	Chinese Super League	24	6	0	0	—		—		—		24	6
Chengdu Rongcheng	Total		58	10	0	0	—		—		—		58	10
Ulsan HD	2024	K League 1	19	2	3	1	—		9	0	—		31	3
Ulsan HD	2025	K League 1	0	0	1	1	—		1	0	0	0	2	1
Ulsan HD	Total		19	2	4	2	—		10	0	0	0	33	4
Career total			442	64	27	3	14	0	23	1	0	0	506	68

=== International ===
As of match played 23 June 2018

Appearances and goals by national team and year
National team	Year	Apps	Goals
South Korea	2013	2	0
South Korea	2014	7	1
South Korea	2015	2	0
South Korea	2017	4	0
South Korea	2018	7	0
Total		22	1

Results list South Korea's goal tally first.

#	Date	Venue	Opponent	Score	Result	Competition
1.	10 October 2014	Cheonan Stadium, South Korea	Paraguay	1–0	2–0	Friendly

== Honours ==
South Korea

- EAFF East Asian Cup: 2015, 2017

Suwon Samsung Bluewings

- Korean FA Cup: 2019

Ulsan HD

- K League 1: 2024
