= University of Teacher Education Fukuoka =

Private university in Munakata, Fukuoka, Japan

Coordinates: 33°48′40″N 130°35′39″E

University of Teacher Education Fukuoka (福岡教育大学, Fukuoka Kyōiku Daigaku) (UTEF) is a national university in Munakata, Fukuoka, Japan. The predecessor of the school was founded in 1876, and it was chartered as a university in 1949. The present name was adopted in 1966.

== Campus and Location ==
Located in Munakata, a city in Fukuoka Prefecture, UTEF’s main campus features a combination of traditional and modern educational facilities.

== Associated primary schools ==
- Fukuoka University of Education Kindergarten
- Fukuoka University of Education Fukuoka Elementary School
- Fukuoka University of Education Fukuoka Junior High School
- Fukuoka University of Education Kurume Elementary School
- Fukuoka University of Education Kurume Junior High School
- Fukuoka University of Education Kokura Elementary School
- Fukuoka University of Education Kokura Junior High School

These schools provide hands-on teaching opportunities and contribute to the development of innovative educational practices.

=== Academic Programs ===
UTEF offers undergraduate and graduate programs. The curriculum includes courses in pedagogy, subject-specific teaching methods, and educational research.

=== Athletics ===
UTEF supports a variety of athletic programs. Notably, its American football team competes in the Kyūshū Collegiate American Football Association.

=== History ===
- 1876: Established as a teacher training institution.
- 1949: Officially chartered as a university.
- 1966: Adopted the current name, University of Teacher Education Fukuoka.

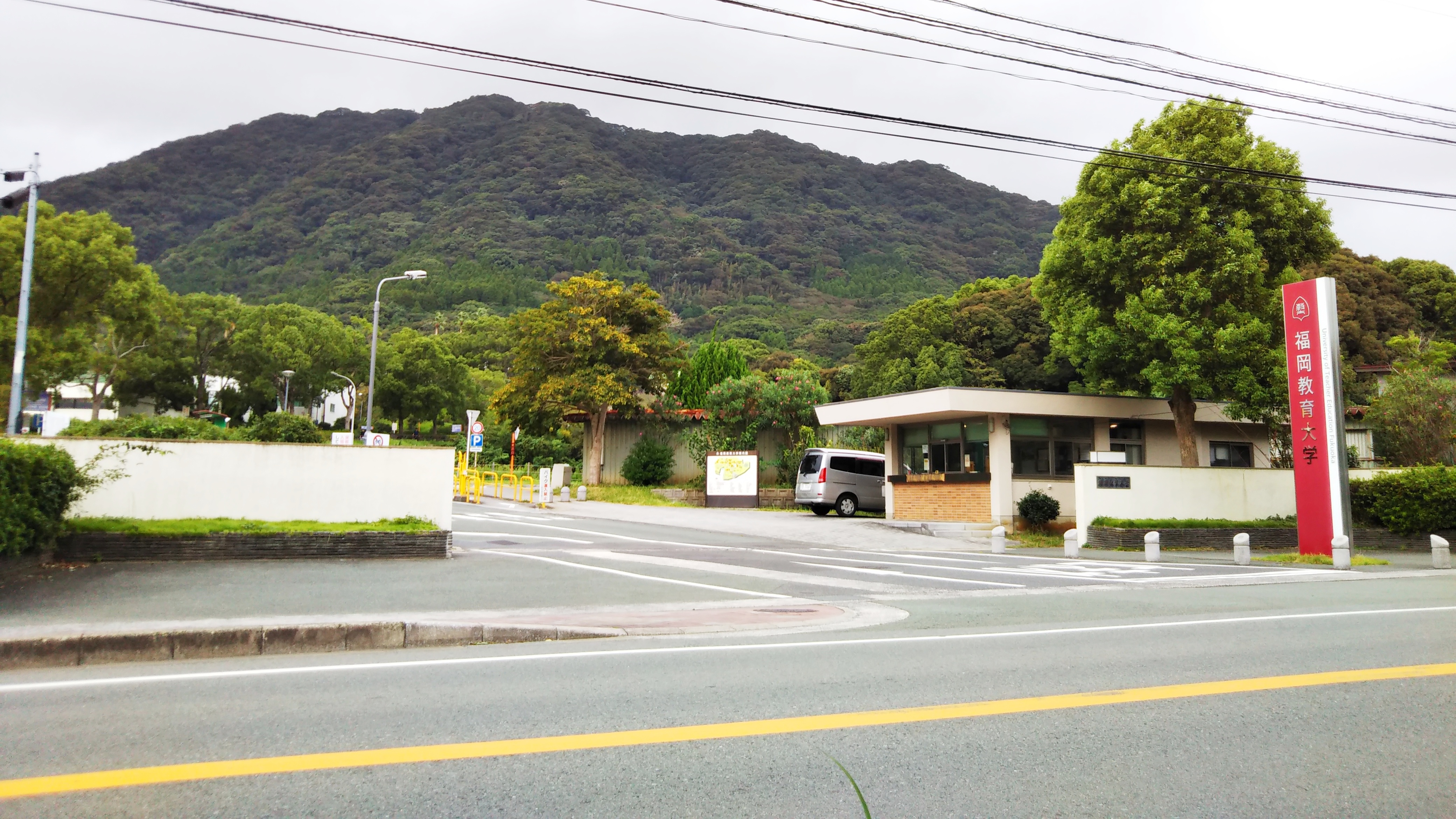
Main gate

=== American Football ===
UTEF has an American football team that competes in the Kyūshū Collegiate American Football Association
