= Naoyuki Fujita =

Japanese footballer (born 1987)

Naoyuki Fujita 藤田 直之
Personal information
- Full name: Naoyuki Fujita
- Date of birth: 22 June 1987 (age 39)
- Place of birth: Fukuoka, Japan
- Height: 1.75 m (5 ft 9 in)
- Position: Midfielder

Youth career
- Namazuta FC
- Rising Stars
- 2003–2005: Tokai Univ. Daigo High School

College career
Years	Team	Apps	(Gls)
2006–2009	Fukuoka University		

Senior career*
Years	Team	Apps	(Gls)
2010–2015	Sagan Tosu	182	(13)
2016–2018	Vissel Kobe	82	(3)
2019–2021	Cerezo Osaka	87	(2)
2022–2024	Sagan Tosu	60	(4)

International career^{‡}
2015	Japan	1	(0)
- * Club domestic league appearances and goals as of 21:57, 17 July 2023 (UTC) ‡ National team caps and goals as of 5 August 2015

Naoyuki Fujita (藤田 直之, Fujita Naoyuki; born 22 June 1987, in Fukuoka) is a Japanese footballer who plays as a midfielder for J2 League club Sagan Tosu.

== Career ==
Fujita has played for several Japanese football clubs since 2010, including Sagan Tosu, Vissel Kobe, and Cerezo Osaka. He made his professional debut with Sagan Tosu in 2010, in a 1–1 draw with Consadole Sapporo, playing in the J2 League. He scored his first goal for the club in the third game of his debut season in a 2–1 victory over Ehime FC. Over six seasons with Sagan Tosu from 2010 to 2015, Fujita made 182 league appearances and scored 13 goals. In the 2012 season when the team was promoted to the J1 League, he was appointed captain and until 2015, he was the captain for four consecutive years. He then moved to Vissel Kobe in 2016, playing three seasons and making 82 league appearances with 3 goals. In 2019 he joined Cerezo Osaka, playing for them in 2019 and 2020 and making 56 league appearances with 2 goals. Fujita returned to Sagan Tosu in 2022 and was made captain of the team once again.

== Club statistics ==
As of 17 July 2023.

Appearances and goals by club, season and competition
Club performance			League		Cup		League Cup		Other		Total	
Season	Club	League	Apps	Goals	Apps	Goals	Apps	Goals	Apps	Goals	Apps	Goals
Japan			League		Emperor's Cup		J. League Cup		Other		Total	
2009	Fukuoka University	-	-		2	1	-		-		2	1
2010	Sagan Tosu	J2 League	32	4	1	1	-		-		33	5
2011	Sagan Tosu	J2 League	23	0	0	0	-		-		23	0
2012	Sagan Tosu	J1 League	33	6	1	0	4	0	-		38	6
2013	Sagan Tosu	J1 League	31	2	5	0	2	0	-		38	2
2014	Sagan Tosu	J1 League	32	1	2	0	4	0	-		38	1
2015	Sagan Tosu	J1 League	31	0	3	0	3	0	-		37	0
2016	Vissel Kobe	J1 League	32	0	3	1	6	1	-		41	2
2017	Vissel Kobe	J1 League	21	1	3	0	3	0	-		27	1
2018	Vissel Kobe	J1 League	29	2	2	0	4	1	-		35	3
2019	Cerezo Osaka	J1 League	25	0	1	0	7	0	-		33	0
2020	Cerezo Osaka	J1 League	31	1	0	0	1	0	-		32	1
2021	Cerezo Osaka	J1 League	31	2	3	0	2	1	4 (Note: Appearances in the AFC Champions League)	0	40	3
2022	Sagan Tosu	J1 League	26	2	1	0	5	0	-		32	2
2023	Sagan Tosu	J1 League	14	0	2	1	2	0	-		18	1
Career total			391	21	29	4	43	3	4	0	467	28

== National team statistics ==
Japan national team
Year	Apps	Goals
2015	1	0
Total	1	0
