= Kohei Kuroki =

Japanese footballer

Kohei Kuroki 黒木 晃平
Personal information
- Full name: Kohei Kuroki
- Date of birth: July 31, 1989 (age 37)
- Place of birth: Kikuchi District, Kumamoto, Japan
- Height: 1.75 m (5 ft 9 in)
- Position: Midfielder

Team information
- Current team: Roasso Kumamoto
- Number: 2

Youth career
- 2005–2007: Ohzu High School

College career
Years	Team	Apps	(Gls)
2008–2011	Saga University		

Senior career*
Years	Team	Apps	(Gls)
2010–2012	Sagan Tosu	23	(0)
2013–	Roasso Kumamoto	284	(11)
- * Club domestic league appearances and goals as of 23 August 2026

Kohei Kuroki (黒木 晃平, Kuroki Kohei; born July 31, 1989) is a Japanese football player for Roasso Kumamoto.

He is the twin brother of Kyohei Kuroki.

== Club statistics ==
Updated to 23 February 2018.

Club performance			League		Cup		League Cup		Total	
Season	Club	League	Apps	Goals	Apps	Goals	Apps	Goals	Apps	Goals
Japan			League		Emperor's Cup		J. League Cup		Total	
2010	Saga University	Other	-		1	0	–		1	0
2010	Sagan Tosu	J2 League	7	0	-		–		7	0
2011	Sagan Tosu	J2 League	12	0	0	0	-		12	0
2012	Sagan Tosu	J1 League	3	0	0	0	3	0	6	0
2013	Roasso Kumamoto	J2 League	27	1	2	0	–		29	1
2014	Roasso Kumamoto	J2 League	14	0	0	0	–		14	0
2015	Roasso Kumamoto	J2 League	35	1	3	0	–		38	1
2016	Roasso Kumamoto	J2 League	25	3	2	0	–		28	3
2017	Roasso Kumamoto	J2 League	40	2	1	0	–		41	2
Total			163	7	9	0	3	0	176	7
