= Takuya Muro =

Japanese footballer

Personal information
- Full name: Takuya Muro
- Date of birth: November 2, 1982 (age 43)
- Place of birth: Osaka, Japan
- Height: 1.81 m (5 ft 11 1/2 in)
- Position: Goalkeeper

Youth career
- 2001–2004: Kansai Gaidai University

Senior career*
Years	Team	Apps	(Gls)
2005	Okinawa Karuyushi FC		
2006	Bay Olympic		
2007	Tokyo Verdy	0	(0)
2008–2013	Sagan Tosu	106	(0)
2014	Oita Trinita	1	(0)
Total		107	(0)
- * Club domestic league appearances and goals

Takuya Muro (室 拓哉, Muro Takuya; born November 2, 1982) is a former Japanese football player.

== Club statistics ==
Club performance			League		Cup		League Cup		Total	
Season	Club	League	Apps	Goals	Apps	Goals	Apps	Goals	Apps	Goals
Japan			League		Emperor's Cup		League Cup		Total	
2005	Okinawa Kariyushi FC	Regional Leagues					-			
New Zealand			League		Chatham Cup		League Cup		Total	
2006	Bay Olympic									
Japan			League		Emperor's Cup		League Cup		Total	
2007	Tokyo Verdy	J2 League	0	0	0	0	-		0	0
2008	Sagan Tosu	J2 League	24	0	1	0	-		25	0
2009	Sagan Tosu	J2 League	47	0	2	0	-		49	0
2010	Sagan Tosu	J2 League					-			
Career total							0	0		
