= Taku Akahoshi =

Japanese footballer

Taku Akahoshi 赤星 拓
Personal information
- Full name: Taku Akahoshi
- Date of birth: April 21, 1984 (age 42)
- Place of birth: Fukuoka, Japan
- Height: 1.85 m (6 ft 1 in)
- Position: Goalkeeper

Youth career
- 2003–2006: Fukuoka University

Senior career*
Years	Team	Apps	(Gls)
2007–2018	Sagan Tosu	145	(0)
2018	→ Tokushima Vortis (loan)	0	(0)
- * Club domestic league appearances and goals as of 26 December 2018

Taku Akahoshi (赤星 拓, Akahoshi Taku; born April 21, 1984) is a retired Japanese footballer.

== Career statistics ==
Updated to 23 February 2018.

Appearances and goals by club, season and competition
Club	Season	League			Emperor's Cup		J.League Cup		Total	
Club	Season	Division	Apps	Goals	Apps	Goals	Apps	Goals	Apps	Goals
Sagan Tosu	2007	J2 League	32	0	2	0	–		34	0
Sagan Tosu	2008	J2 League	15	0	0	0	–		15	0
Sagan Tosu	2009	J2 League	0	0	0	0	–		0	0
Sagan Tosu	2010	J2 League	20	0	0	0	–		20	0
Sagan Tosu	2011	J2 League	19	0	0	0	–		19	0
Sagan Tosu	2012	J1 League	30	0	1	0	5	0	36	0
Sagan Tosu	2013	J1 League	16	0	0	0	3	0	19	0
Sagan Tosu	2014	J1 League	0	0	0	0	1	0	1	0
Sagan Tosu	2015	J1 League	11	0	0	0	1	0	12	0
Sagan Tosu	2016	J1 League	0	0	1	0	3	0	4	0
Sagan Tosu	2017	J1 League	2	0	0	0	2	0	4	0
Total			145	0	4	0	15	0	164	0
