= Yohei Toyoda =

Japanese footballer (born 1985)

Yohei Toyoda 豊田 陽平
Personal information
- Full name: Yohei Toyoda
- Date of birth: 11 April 1985 (age 41)
- Place of birth: Komatsu, Ishikawa, Japan
- Height: 1.85 m (6 ft 1 in)
- Position: Forward

Team information
- Current team: Zweigen Kanazawa
- Number: 19

Youth career
- 2001–2003: Seiryo High School

Senior career*
| Years | Team | Apps | (Gls) |
| 2004–2008 | Nagoya Grampus Eight | 33 | (5) |
| 2007–2008 | → Montedio Yamagata (loan) | 52 | (17) |
| 2009–2011 | Kyoto Sanga FC | 21 | (1) |
| 2010–2011 | → Sagan Tosu (loan) | 72 | (36) |
| 2012–2021 | Sagan Tosu | 247 | (92) |
| 2018 | → Ulsan Hyundai FC (loan) | 9 | (2) |
| 2021 | Tochigi SC | 16 | (3) |
| 2022– | Zweigen Kanazawa | 34 | (6) |

International career
| 2008 | Japan U-23 | 3 | (1) |
| 2013–2015 | Japan | 8 | (1) |
- * Club domestic league appearances and goals as of 14 December 2022, 7:11 (UTC)

Yohei Toyoda (豊田 陽平, Toyoda Yōhei; born 11 April 1985) is a Japanese football player who plays for Zweigen Kanazawa. He played for Japan national team.

== Club career ==
After graduating from Seiryo High School, Toyoda joined Nagoya Grampus Eight. He made his first league appearance on August 21, 2004 against Júbilo Iwata. His first league goal came on July 23, 2005 against Kashima Antlers. He played for J2 League side Montedio Yamagata in 2007 and 2008 on a loan deal. After helping Yamagata to promote to J1 League, Toyoda made a permanent move to fellow J1 League side Kyoto Sanga FC in December 2008.

Toyoda went on loan to Ulsan Hyundai FC for the 2018 K League 1 season but his loan was terminated less than halfway through the season as he struggled to make an impact for his new team. He made 9 appearances scoring just 2 goals in Ulsan.

Toyoda loan again to Tochigi SC for the during 2021 J2 League mid season but his loan was terminated less than end through the season as he struggled to make an impact for his new team. He made 16 appearances scoring just 3 goals in Tochigi.

On 24 December 2021, Toyoda announcement officially transfer to J2 club, Zweigen Kanazawa for upcoming 2022 season.

== National team career ==
Toyoda was a member of the Japan U-23 national team for the 2008 Summer Olympics finals. He scored a goal in a group stage match against Nigeria.

== Career statistics ==
=== Club ===
As of the end of 2022 season.

| Club performance | | | League | | Emperor's Cup | | J.League Cup | | Total | |
| Season | Club | League | Apps | Goals | Apps | Goals | Apps | Goals | Apps | Goals |
|---|---|---|---|---|---|---|---|---|---|---|
| 2004 | Nagoya Grampus Eight | J1 League | 4 | 0 | - | | - | | 4 | 0 |
| 2005 | Nagoya Grampus Eight | J1 League | 20 | 4 | 1 | 1 | 1 | 0 | 22 | 5 |
| 2006 | Nagoya Grampus Eight | J1 League | 9 | 1 | - | | - | | 9 | 1 |
| 2007 | Montedio Yamagata | J2 League | 29 | 6 | 1 | 1 | - | | 30 | 7 |
| 2008 | Montedio Yamagata | J2 League | 23 | 11 | 2 | 2 | - | | 25 | 13 |
| 2009 | Kyoto Sanga FC | J1 League | 21 | 1 | 2 | 1 | 6 | 0 | 29 | 2 |
| 2010 | Sagan Tosu | J2 League | 34 | 13 | 1 | 3 | - | | 35 | 16 |
| 2011 | Sagan Tosu | J2 League | 38 | 23 | - | | - | | 38 | 23 |
| 2012 | Sagan Tosu | J1 League | 33 | 19 | 1 | 0 | 2 | 1 | 36 | 20 |
| 2013 | Sagan Tosu | J1 League | 33 | 20 | 4 | 3 | 3 | 1 | 40 | 24 |
| 2014 | Sagan Tosu | J1 League | 34 | 15 | 3 | 2 | 3 | 1 | 40 | 18 |
| 2015 | Sagan Tosu | J1 League | 29 | 16 | 3 | 1 | 3 | 0 | 35 | 17 |
| 2016 | Sagan Tosu | J1 League | 33 | 13 | 2 | 1 | 5 | 1 | 40 | 15 |
| 2017 | Sagan Tosu | J1 League | 28 | 5 | 2 | 1 | 1 | 0 | 31 | 6 |
| 2018 | Ulsan Hyundai | K League 1 | 9 | 2 | 0 | 0 | - | | 9 | 2 |
| 2018 | Sagan Tosu | J1 League | 8 | 0 | 1 | 0 | 0 | 0 | 9 | 0 |
| 2019 | Sagan Tosu | J1 League | 26 | 4 | 4 | 2 | 3 | 0 | 33 | 6 |
| 2020 | Sagan Tosu | J1 League | 20 | 0 | 0 | 0 | 0 | 0 | 20 | 0 |
| 2021 | Sagan Tosu | J1 League | 3 | 0 | 0 | 0 | 3 | 0 | 6 | 0 |
| 2021 | Tochigi SC (loan) | J2 League | 16 | 3 | - | | - | | 16 | 3 |
| 2018 | Zweigen Kanazawa | J2 League | 34 | 6 | 2 | 2 | - | | 36 | 8 |
| 2023 | Zweigen Kanazawa | J2 League | 0 | 0 | 0 | 0 | 0 | 0 | 0 | 0 |
| Career total | | | 484 | 162 | 30 | 20 | 30 | 4 | 544 | 186 |

== National team statistics ==
Japan national team
| Year | Apps | Goals |
|---|---|---|
| 2013 | 3 | 0 |
| 2014 | 3 | 1 |
| 2015 | 2 | 0 |
| Total | 8 | 1 |

== Honours ==
=== Japan ===
- EAFF East Asian Cup (1) : 2013

=== Individual ===
- J2 League Top Scorer (1) : 2011
- J.League Best XI (1) : 2012
