= Kei Ikeda =

Japanese footballer

Personal information
- Full name: Kei Ikeda
- Date of birth: October 20, 1986 (age 40)
- Place of birth: Inzai, Chiba, Japan
- Height: 1.78 m (5 ft 10 in)
- Position: Striker

Youth career
- 2002–2004: Ryutsu Keizai University

Senior career*
Years	Team	Apps	(Gls)
2005–2008	Ryutsu Keizai Univ.	45	(10)
2009–2019	Sagan Tosu	224	(25)
2019	→ Felda United (loan)	13	(3)
- * Club domestic league appearances and goals

Kei Ikeda (池田 圭, Ikeda Kei; born October 20, 1986 in Inzai, Chiba) is a Japanese retired football player.

== Club career stats ==
Updated to 23 February 2017.

Club performance			League		Cup		League Cup		Total	
Season	Club	League	Apps	Goals	Apps	Goals	Apps	Goals	Apps	Goals
Japan			League		Emperor's Cup		League Cup		Total	
2005	Ryutsu Keizai; University FC	JFL	10	4	-		-		10	4
2006	Ryutsu Keizai; University FC	JFL	17	2	0	0	-		17	2
2007	Ryutsu Keizai; University FC	JFL	11	2	1	0	-		12	2
2008	Ryutsu Keizai; University FC	JFL	7	2	0	0	-		7	2
2009	Sagan Tosu	J2 League	15	1	1	1	-		16	2
2010	Sagan Tosu	J2 League	24	1	1	2	-		25	3
2011	Sagan Tosu	J2 League	35	7	1	0	-		36	7
2012	Sagan Tosu	J1 League	26	3	0	0	1	0	27	3
2013	Sagan Tosu	J1 League	31	6	5	1	2	2	38	9
2014	Sagan Tosu	J1 League	33	5	2	1	3	1	38	7
2015	Sagan Tosu	J1 League	26	1	2	1	3	0	31	2
2016	Sagan Tosu	J1 League	15	1	1	0	5	1	21	2
Career total			250	35	14	6	14	4	278	45
